= I Remember Thelonious =

Live album by Steve Lacy & Mal Waldron
- Released: 1996
- Recorded: June 28, 1992
- Genre: Jazz
- Length: 60:02
- Label: Nel Jazz
- Producer: Gianni Salvioni

Steve Lacy chronology
| Clangs (1992) | I Remember Thelonious (1996) | We See (1992) |

Mal Waldron chronology
| Hot House (1991) | I Remember Thelonious (1992) | Let's Call This... Esteem (1993) |

I Remember Thelonious is a live album by soprano saxophonist Steve Lacy and pianist Mal Waldron recorded in Italy in 1992 and released on the Nel Jazz label.

== Reception ==
The Allmusic review by Ken Dryden awarded the album 3 stars, stating: "Waldron makes the best of the situation and provides superb accompaniment for Lacy's adventurous flights as well as offering his trademarked dark but fascinating solos... This is a fascinating if not quite essential CD by Steve Lacy and Mal Waldron."

Professional ratings
Review scores
| Source | Rating |
|---|---|
| Allmusic | 3/5 stars |

== Track listing ==
All compositions by Thelonious Monk except as indicated

1. "Monk's Dream" – 6:23
2. "Reflections" – 7:13
3. "Epistrophy" – 6:15
4. "Mysterioso" – 7:08
5. "Let's Call This" – 6:35
6. "'Round Midnight" – 9:19
7. "Evidence" – 4:50
8. "Well You Needn't" – 3:09
9. "I'll Keep Loving You" (Bud Powell) – 9:10

- Recorded at the Jazz in' It Festival in Vignola, Italy on June 28, 1992

== Personnel ==
- Steve Lacy – soprano saxophone
- Mal Waldron – piano
