= Anthem (Steve Lacy album) =

Studio album by Steve Lacy
- Released: 1990
- Recorded: June 27–28, 1989
- Genre: Jazz
- Length: 57:42
- Label: RCA Novus

Steve Lacy chronology
| Morning Joy (1990) | Anthem (1990) | Rushes: 10 Songs from Russia (1990) |

Anthem is an album by Steve Lacy released on the Arista Novus label in 1990. It features five of Lacy's compositions (and one by Jean-Jacques Avenel) with texts by Osip Mandelstam and Mary Frazee performed by Lacy, Bobby Few, Steve Potts, Jean-Jacques Avenel, John Betsch, Sam Kelly, Glenn Ferris, La Velle and Irene Aebi.

== Reception ==
The Allmusic review by Stephen Cook awarded the album 4.5 stars stating "With more composition and performance highlights than most jazz albums ever muster, Anthem is essential listening for Lacy fans and all other adventurous listeners out there.".

Professional ratings
Review scores
| Source | Rating |
|---|---|
| Allmusic | 4.5/5 stars |

== Track listing ==
1. "Number One" - 9:01
2. "Prayer" - 9:21
3. "J. J.'s Jam" (Avenel) - 6:53
4. "Prelude And Anthem" (text by Osip Mandelstam) - 15:48
5. "The Mantle" (text by Mary Frazee) - 9:22
6. "The Rent" - 7:17

All compositions by Steve Lacy except as indicated

  - Recorded June 27–28, 1989 at Family Sound Studios, Paris

== Personnel ==
- Steve Lacy - soprano saxophone
- Bobby Few - piano
- Steve Potts - alto and soprano saxophones
- Jean-Jacques Avenel - bass
- John Betsch - drums
- La Velle - vocals
- Irene Aebi - vocals
- Sam Kelly - percussion
- Glenn Ferris - trombone
