= The Door (Steve Lacy album) =

Studio album by Steve Lacy
- Released: 1989
- Recorded: July 4–5, 1988
- Genre: Jazz
- Length: 58:49
- Label: RCA Novus
- Producer: Ed Michel

Steve Lacy chronology
Paris Blues (1987)	The Door (1989)	Morning Joy (1990)

The Door is the second album by Steve Lacy to be released on the RCA Novus label. It was released in 1989 and features four of Lacy's compositions and one each by Monk, Bud Powell, Duke Ellington and George Handy performed by Lacy, Bobby Few, Steve Potts, Jean-Jacques Avenel, Oliver Johnson and Irene Aebi with Sam Woodyard guesting on one track recorded shortly before his death.

== Reception ==
In his review for AllMusic, Scott Yanow states "Overall this is a well-conceived and highly recommended set for Steve Lacy fans.".

Professional ratings
Review scores
Source	Rating
Allmusic	4/5 stars

== Track listing ==
1. "The Door" - 7:26
2. "Ugly Beauty" (Monk) - 7:48
3. "Cliches" - 8:27
4. "Forgetful" (Handy, Segal) - 7:21
5. "Blinks" - 9:13
6. "Coming Up" (Powell) - 4:43
7. "The Breath" - 4:25
8. "Virgin Jungle" (Ellington, Strayhorn) - 9:21

All compositions by Steve Lacy except as indicated
- Recorded at Family Sound, Paris on July 4 and 5, 1988

== Personnel ==
- Steve Lacy - soprano saxophone
- Bobby Few (1, 2, 4, 5 & 8) - piano
- Steve Potts (1, 2, 5 & 8) - alto and soprano saxophones
- Jean-Jacques Avenel (1-3, 5, 6 & 8) - bass, sanza on (3)
- Oliver Johnson (1, 2, 5-8) - drums
- Irene Aebi (8) - violin
- Sam Woodyard (8) - drums
