= Hot House (Steve Lacy album) =

Studio album by Steve Lacy & Mal Waldron
- Released: 1991
- Recorded: July 12–13, 1990
- Genre: Jazz
- Length: 54:28
- Label: RCA Novus

Steve Lacy chronology
Flim-Flam (1990)	Hot House (1991)	Itinerary (1991)

Mal Waldron chronology
Spring in Prague (1990)	Hot House (1990)	I Remember Thelonious (1992)

Hot House is an album by Steve Lacy and Mal Waldron released on the RCA Novus label in 1991. It features duo performances of tunes written by Herbie Nichols, Tadd Dameron, Bud Powell, Thelonious Monk. Sidney Bechet, Duke Ellington along with two compositions by Waldron and one by Lacy.

== Reception ==
The Allmusic review by Chris Kelsey awarded the album 4.5 stars, stating: "Though certain gestures recur during the course of their improvisations, those gestures (the raw materials of improvisation) are smaller than those used by younger, less resourceful players. It's as if, instead of building a house made out of prefabricated materials, Lacy and Waldron cut down the trees, split the logs, plane the wood, and nail the boards together one by one. Of course, a Lacy/Waldron house is unlikely to look as slick as one of those prefab jobs, but it will be a much nicer place in which to live. And it's a heckuva a lot more likely to weather the test of time."

Professional ratings
Review scores
Source	Rating
Allmusic	4.5/5 stars

== Track listing ==
1. "House Party Starting" (Nichols) - 6:14
2. "Hot House" (Dameron) - 4:13
3. "I'll Keep Loving You" (Powell) - 9:17
4. "Friday The 13th" (Monk) - 6:07
5. "Mistral Breeze" (Waldron) - 3:33
6. "The Mooche" (Ellington) - 5:55
7. "Petite Fleur" (Bechet) - 7:04
8. "Snake Out" (Waldron) - 6:39
9. "Retreat" (Lacy) - 5:26

- Recorded July 12–13, 1990 at Studios Ferber, Paris

== Personnel ==
- Steve Lacy - soprano saxophone
- Mal Waldron - piano
