= Axieme =

Studio album by Steve Lacy
- Released: 1975
- Recorded: September 1975; Como, Italy
- Genre: Jazz
- Length: 49:10
- Label: Red

Steve Lacy chronology
Dreams (1975)	Axieme (1975)	Trickles (1976)

Professional ratings
Review scores
Source	Rating
AllMusic	4/5 stars
The Penguin Guide to Jazz Recordings	3/4 stars

Axieme is a live album by the saxophonist Steve Lacy. It was released in 1975 on Red Records. Although not labelled on the LP or CD releases, the album contains solo tracks of Steve Lacy's compositions "Deadline", "The New Duck", "Tao (Suite)", "Coastline" and "The Crust".

== Track listing ==
All compositions by Steve Lacy.

1. "Axieme, Pt. 1 & 2" - 24:01
2. "Axieme, Pt. 3 & 4" - 25:09

== Personnel ==
- Steve Lacy - soprano saxophone
