= Epistrophy (Steve Lacy album) =

Epistropy

Studio album by Steve Lacy
- Released: 1969
- Recorded: September 23, 1969
- Genre: Jazz
- Length: 37:51
- Label: BYG
- Producer: Jean Luc Young

Steve Lacy chronology
Moon (1969)	Epistropy (1969)	Wordless (1971)

Epistrophy (also released as Steve Lacy Plays Monk) is the second album by Steve Lacy to consist entirely of tunes written by Thelonious Monk following Reflections (1958). It was released in 1969 on the French BYG label and features performances by Lacy, Michel Graillier, Jean-François Jenny-Clark and Aldo Romano.

== Reception ==
The Allmusic review by Thom Jurek awarded the album 4 stars stating "This is easily Lacy's "straightest" album from the period, and he stays melodically and harmonically close to Monk's original compositions in the heads before taking off elsewhere in the solos. But Lacy keeps to the notion of repetition, syncopation, and melodic invention that Monk did, and the band is nearly symbiotic in its communication around and with him. The music here is a delight and a revelation all at the same time. The sound is warm and full and the transfer is solid.".

Professional ratings
Review scores
Source	Rating
Allmusic	4/5 stars

== Track listing ==
1. "Thelonious" - 7:00
2. "Ruby My Dear" - 4:20
3. "Light Blue" - 6:00
4. "Epistrophy" - 2:14
5. "Epistrophy" - 7:50
6. "Misterioso" - 4:50
7. "Friday the Thirteenth" - 5:37

All compositions by Thelonious Monk

  - Recorded in Paris, September 23, 1969

== Personnel ==
- Steve Lacy - soprano saxophone
- Michel Graillier - piano
- Jean-François Jenny Clark - bass
- Aldo Romano - drums
