= Only Monk =

Studio album by Steve Lacy
- Released: 1987
- Recorded: July 29–31, 1985
- Genre: Jazz
- Length: 44:30
- Label: Soul Note
- Producer: Giovanni Bonandrini

Steve Lacy chronology
Deadline (1987)	Only Monk (1987)	Sempre Amore (1987)

Only Monk is the third album by Steve Lacy to be released on the Italian Soul Note label (following two releases on the related Black Saint label). It features solo performances of nine tunes written by Thelonious Monk by Lacy. It is the second solo album composed totally of Monk's compositions recorded by Lacy following Eronel (1979) and follows a tradition established on Lacy's second album Reflections (1958) and Epistrophy (1969).

== Reception ==
Professional ratings
Review scores
Source	Rating
AllMusic	4/5 stars
The Penguin Guide to Jazz	3.5/4 stars

The AllMusic review by Scott Yanow stated, "Steve Lacy has long been one of the foremost interpreters of pianist Thelonious Monk's music. This set is a solo soprano saxophone recital in which Lacy digs into nine of Monk's compositions. Most of the interpretations are quite concise, with all but the seven-minute 'Work' clocking in at under six minutes. As usual, Lacy shows great respect for the melodies, and his improvisations are built off of the themes rather than just the chord changes. The sparse setting allows the soprano master to utilize space effectively and to take his time. The overall results, which are certainly for selective tastes, are often fascinating." The Penguin Guide to Jazz compared this album with the later More Monk, stating that Only Monk was "more challenging and requires a closer acquaintance with the source material".

== Track listing ==
1. "Evidence" – 3:42
2. "Humph" – 3:29
3. "Eronel" – 4:38
4. "Pannonica" – 5:48
5. "Little Rootie-Tootie" – 4:23
6. "Misterioso" – 5:49
7. "Work" – 7:16
8. "Light Blue" – 4:18
9. "Who Knows?" – 5:07

All compositions by Thelonious Monk
- Recorded at Barigozzi Studio, Milan, Italy, on July 29–31, 1985

== Personnel ==
- Steve Lacy – soprano saxophone
