= Revenue (album) =

Studio album by Steve Lacy Quartet
- Released: 1993
- Recorded: February 23, 24 & 25, 1993
- Genre: Jazz
- Length: 49:19
- Label: Soul Note
- Producer: Giovanni Bonandrini

Steve Lacy chronology
Sweet Sixteen (1993)	Revenue (1993)	Let's Call This... Esteem (1993)

Revenue is an album by soprano saxophonist Steve Lacy, recorded in 1993 and released on the Italian Soul Note label.

== Reception ==
The AllMusic review by Chris Kelsey stated: "This music is a fine example of what happens when a visionary musician makes something extending and expanding upon the tradition his life's work. An excellent disc".

Professional ratings
Review scores
Source	Rating
AllMusic	4.5/5 stars
The Penguin Guide to Jazz Recordings	3.5/4 stars

== Track listing ==
All compositions by Steve Lacy

1. "The Rent" - 8:42
2. "Revenue" - 6:03
3. "This Is It" - 12:11
4. "The Uh Uh Uh" - 7:41
5. "Esteem" - 9:18
6. "I Do Not Believe" - 4:50
7. "Gospel" - 8:15
- Recorded at Barigozzi Studio in Milano, Italy on February 23, 24 & 25, 1993

== Personnel ==
- Steve Lacy - soprano saxophone
- Steve Potts - alto saxophone, soprano saxophone
- Jean-Jacques Avenel - bass
- John Betsch - drums
