= Communiqué (disambiguation) =

A communiqué is a brief report or statement released by a public agency.

Communiqué may also refer to:

- Communiqué (band), a rock band
- Communiqué (Dire Straits album) (and its respective title track), 1979
- Communiqué (Steve Lacy and Mal Waldron album), 1997
- "Communique", a song by John Frusciante and Josh Klinghoffer from the 2004 album A Sphere in the Heart of Silence
- Communiqué, the newsletter of the Association for Preservation Technology International
- Communiqué, the newsletter of the National Association of School Psychologists
- The Communiqué, the official newsletter for STARFLEET: The International Star Trek Fan Association, Inc.
