= One Fell Swoop =

Studio album by Steve Lacy Quartet featuring Charles Tyler
- Released: 1987
- Recorded: June 13–15, 1986
- Studio: IRCAM, Paris, France
- Genre: Jazz
- Length: 52:45
- Label: Silkheart; SHLP 103
- Producer: Steve Lacy

Steve Lacy chronology
The Kiss (1986)	One Fell Swoop (1987)	The Gleam (1986)

One Fell Swoop is an album by saxophonist Steve Lacy's Quartet featuring Charles Tyler, recorded in Paris in 1986 and released on the Swedish Silkheart label.

== Reception ==
Professional ratings
Review scores
Source	Rating
AllMusic	4/5 stars
The Penguin Guide to Jazz	3.5/4 stars
The Philadelphia Inquirer	4/4 stars

The Penguin Guide to Jazz states: "There are signs on One Fell Swoop that he is looking back and rerunning some ideas from his own bottom drawer, reviving that Dixieland counterpoint which had tended to get unravelled and spun out at unrecognisable length in more recent years. The title track (two performances) and 'Ode to Lady Day' are splendid performances." In his review on AllMusic, Scott Yanow states: "The inside/outside music rewards repeated listenings, and the Lacy/Tyler match-up, helped by their contrasting but complementary styles, works quite well".

== Track listing ==
All compositions by Steve Lacy except where noted.

1. "One Fell Swoop" [Take 2] – 7:52
2. "Ode to Lady Day" (Charles Tyler) – 7:34
3. "Wickets" – 9:46
4. "Keepsake" – 8:44
5. "The Adventures Of" (Tyler) – 7:17
6. "Friday the 13th" (Thelonious Monk) – 4:53
7. "One Fell Swoop" [Take 1] – 7:07 Bonus track on CD

== Personnel ==
- Steve Lacy – soprano saxophone; lays out on "Ode to Lady Day"
- Charles Tyler – baritone saxophone, alto saxophone
- Jean-Jacques Avenel – bass
- Oliver Johnson – drums
