= 5 x Monk 5 x Lacy =

Live album by Steve Lacy
- Released: 1997
- Recorded: March 26, 1994
- Venue: The Stockholm Kulturhuset, Sweden
- Genre: Free jazz
- Length: 45:07
- Label: Silkheart SHCD 144
- Producer: Keith Knox

Steve Lacy chronology
Communiqué (1994)	5 x Monk 5 x Lacy (1997)	Eternal Duo '95 (1995)

5 x Monk 5 x Lacy is a live solo album by the soprano saxophonist Steve Lacy, recorded in Sweden in 1994 and released on the Silkheart label.

== Reception ==
Professional ratings
Review scores
Source	Rating
AllMusic	4.5/5 stars
The Penguin Guide to Jazz	4/4 stars

In AllMusic, Scott Yanow wrote that Lacey's "interpretations are so self-sufficient that one does not miss the other instruments, although it is quite easy to 'hear' the bass and drums behind the soprano... Highly recommended". The Penguin Guide to Jazz included the album in its "Core Collection" of recommended jazz recordings. According to JazzTimes, "the entirety of Lacy's art is to be found in compacted form in solo concerts like 5 X Monk 5 X Lacy".

== Track listing ==
All compositions are by Steve Lacy except as indicated

1. "Shuffle Boil" (Thelonious Monk) – 3:48
2. "Eronel" (Monk) – 3:49
3. "Evidence" (Monk) – 3:37
4. "Pannonica" (Monk) – 5:24
5. "Who Knows?" (Monk) – 3:12
6. "The Crust" – 4:31
7. "Blues for Aida" – 5:51
8. "Revenue" – 5:27
9. "Lunch" – 4:13
10. "Deadline"- 5:15

== Personnel ==
- Steve Lacy – soprano saxophone
