= Soprano Sax (Steve Lacy album) =

Studio album by Steve Lacy
- Released: 1958
- Recorded: November 1, 1957
- Studio: Van Gelder, Hackensack, NJ
- Genre: Jazz
- Length: 33:33
- Label: Prestige; PRLP 7125
- Producer: Bob Weinstock

Steve Lacy chronology
Soprano Sax (1958)	Reflections (1959)

Soprano Sax (also released as Soprano Today) is the debut album by Steve Lacy, released on the Prestige label in 1958. It features performances by Lacy, Wynton Kelly, Buell Neidlinger and Dennis Charles.

== Reception ==
The AllMusic review by Bob Rusch stated, "This was the first of three recordings soprano saxophonist Steve Lacy made for Prestige and this 11/1/57 session was his first as a leader...There was a controlled tension to this date, like everybody's trying to play, carefully, to a common goal. It's almost as if someone were present to make sure everybody stayed within obvious perimeters."

Professional ratings
Review scores
Source	Rating
AllMusic	4.5/5 stars
The Penguin Guide to Jazz Recordings	3/4 stars
The Rolling Stone Jazz Record Guide	5/5 stars

== Track listing ==
1. "Day Dream" (Strayhorn, Ellington) - 4:23
2. "Alone Together" (Dietz, Schwartz) - 6:35
3. "Work" (Monk) - 5:24
4. "Rockin' in Rhythm" (Ellington, Mills, Carney) - 4:05
5. "Little Girl, Your Daddy Is Calling You" (Unknown) - 4:32
6. "Easy to Love" (Porter) - 8:25

- Recorded in Hackensack, November 1, 1957

== Personnel ==
- Steve Lacy - soprano saxophone
- Wynton Kelly - piano
- Buell Neidlinger - bass
- Dennis Charles - drums
