= Steve Potts (jazz musician) =

American jazz musician

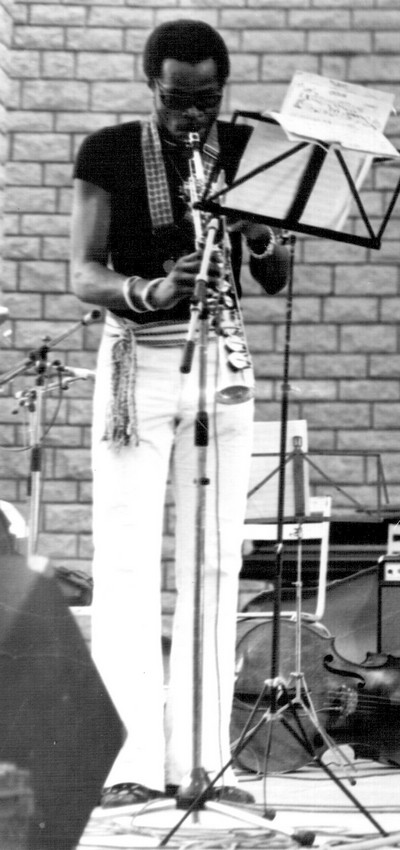
Steve Potts in 1976

Steve Potts (born January 21, 1943, in Columbus, Ohio) is an American jazz saxophonist. Playing mainly alto sax and occasionally soprano, Potts is best known for his 30-year partnership with fellow saxophonist Steve Lacy.

A cousin of tenor saxophonist Buddy Tate, Potts studied architecture in Los Angeles and took lessons from saxophonist Charles Lloyd. Afterwards he went to New York where he was student of Eric Dolphy and performed with Roy Ayers, Richard Davis, Joe Henderson, Reggie Workman, and Chico Hamilton.

In 1970 he moved to Europe to live in Paris. He performed with Dexter Gordon, Johnny Griffin, Slide Hampton, Mal Waldron, Ben Webster, Hal Singer, Christian Escoudé, Boulou Ferré, and Oliver Johnson. Around 1973 he met Steve Lacy and played in his groups for 30 years. Potts also produced film scores.

== Discography ==
=== As leader/co-leader ===
- Great Day in the Morning with Jessye Norman, 1982
- Cross Roads, 1979
- People, 1986
- Flim-Flam (hat ART, 1986 [1991]) with Steve Lacy
- Thank You for Being, 1995
- Mukta, 1998
- Pearl, 1990
- Wet Spot, 2000

=== As sideman ===
With Chico Hamilton

- The Gamut (Solid State, 1968)
- The Head Hunters (Solid State, 1969)

With Steve Lacy

- Mal Waldron with the Steve Lacy Quintet (America, 1972)
- The Gap (America, 1972)
- The Crust (Emanem, 1973)
- Scraps (Saravah, 1974)
- Flakes (RCA Vista, 1974)
- Dreams (Saravah, 1975)
- Raps (Adelphi, 1977)
- Follies (FMP, 1977)
- The Owl (Saravah, 1977)
- Points (Chant Du Monde, 1978)
- Stamps (HatHut, 1979)
- Troubles (Black Saint, 1979)
- The Way (Hathut, 1979 [1980])
- Tips (Hathut, 1979)
- Songs (hat ART, 1981) with Brion Gysin
- Ballets (Hathut, 1981)
- Blinks (Hathut, 1983)
- Prospectus (hat ART, 1983) also released as Cliches
- Futurities (Hathut, 1984)
- The Condor (Soul Note, 1985)
- The Gleam (Silkheart, 1986)
- Morning Joy (Hathut, 1986)
- Live in Budapest (West Wind, 1987)
- Momentum (Novus, 1987)
- The Window (Novus, 1988)
- The Door (Novus, 1989)
- Anthem (Novus, 1990)
- Itinerary (Hathut, 1991)
- Live at Sweet Basil (RCA Novus, 1992)
- Clangs (hat ART, 1993)
- We See (Hathut, 1993)
- Vespers (Soul Note, 1993)
- Revenue (Soul Note, 1993)

== Film scores ==
- Sujet ou Le secrétaire aux 1001 tiroirs, 1975
- Bengali Night, 1988
- Louise (take 2), 1998
