= Kent Carter =

American jazz bassist (1939–2026)

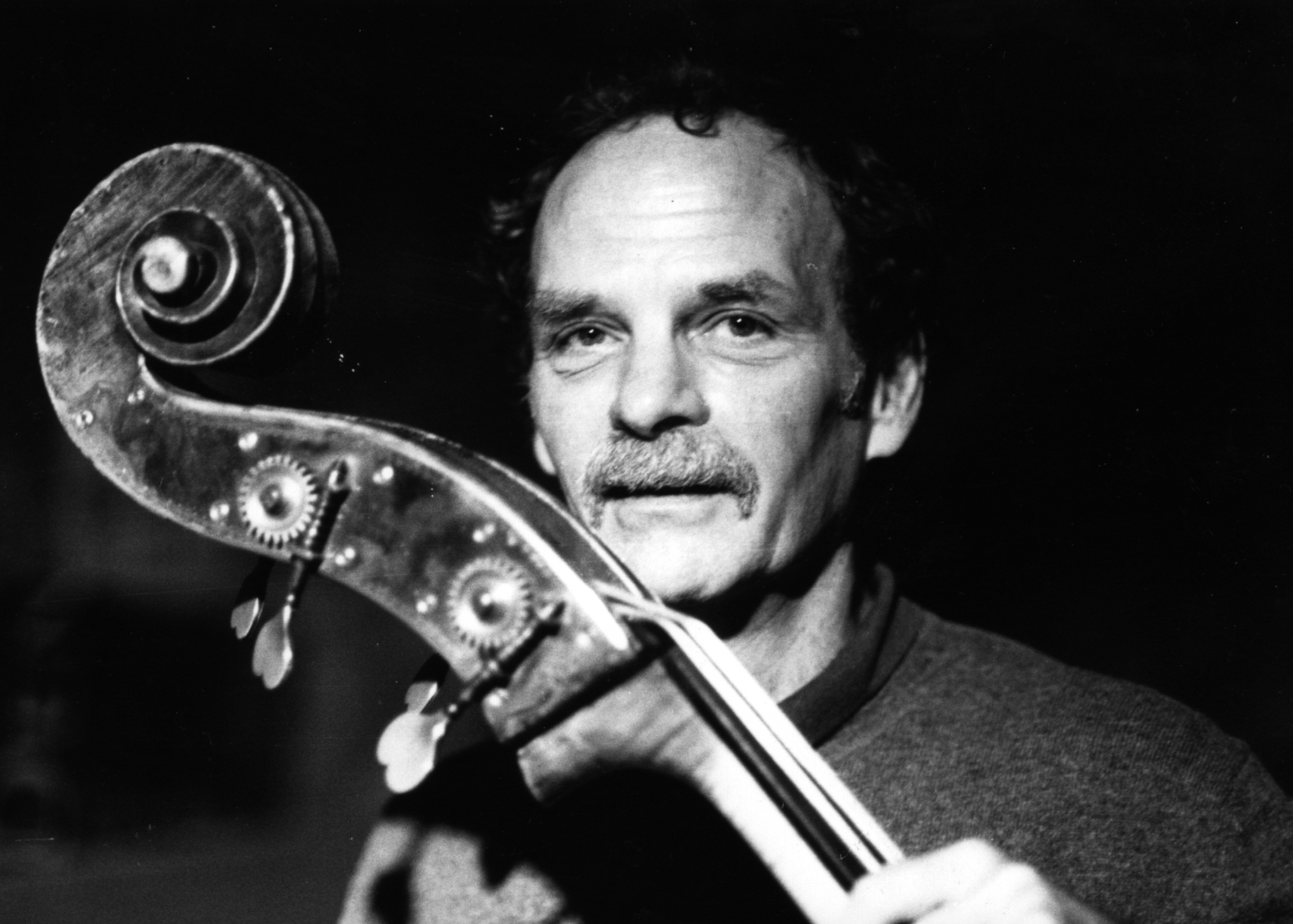
- Kent Carter in 1998

Background information
- Born: June 14, 1939; Hanover, New Hampshire, U.S.
- Died: September 30, 2026 (aged 87)
- Genres: Jazz, avant-garde jazz
- Occupations: Musician, composer
- Instrument: Bass
- Years active: 1960s–2026
- Labels: Ictus, Emanem

Kent Carter (June 14, 1939 – September 30, 2026) was an American jazz bassist. His father, Alan Carter, founded the Vermont Symphony Orchestra. He is also the grandson of American artist, Rockwell Kent. He worked in Steve Lacy's group, played on the two Jazz Composer's Orchestra albums and released albums for Emanem Records.

Carter died on September 30, 2026, at the age of 87.

== Discography ==
=== As leader ===
- Beauvais Cathedral (Emanem, 1976)
- Lost in June (Ictus, 1977)
- The Willisau Suites (Emanem, 1984)
- The Juillaguet Collection (Emanem, 1996)
- Intersections (Emanem, 2006)
- Summer Works 2009 (Emanem, 2010)
- Oratorios and Songs (Emanem, 2010)

=== As sideman ===
With Paul Bley

- Touching (Debut, 1965)

With Don Cherry

- The Summer House Sessions (Blank Forms, 2021)

With the Jazz Composer's Orchestra

- Communication (JCOA, 1965)
- The Jazz Composer's Orchestra (JCOA, 1968)

With Steve Lacy

- Disposability (RCA, 1966)
- Journey Without End with Mal Waldron (RCA Victor, 1971)
- Mal Waldron with the Steve Lacy Quintet (America, 1972)
- Trickles (Black Saint, 1976)
- Troubles (Black Saint, 1977)
- Stamps (HatHut, 1979)
- The Way (HatHut, 1979 [1980])

With Gianni Lenoci

- Secret Garden (Silta)

With Roswell Rudd

- Regeneration (Soul Note, 1982)

With the Spontaneous Music Ensemble

- Quintessence (Emanem, 1974 [1986])

With Noah Howard

- Live in Europe - Vol. 1 (Sun Records, 1975)

With Un Drame Musical Instantané

- A Travail égal salaire égal (Grrr, 1982)

With Alan Silva

- Seasons (BYG, 1971)
