= Remains (Steve Lacy album) =

Studio album by Steve Lacy
- Released: 1992
- Recorded: April 29–30, 1991
- Studio: Radio DRS, Zurich, Switzerland
- Genre: Jazz
- Length: 64:20
- Label: hat ART hat ART CD 6102
- Producer: Pia Uehlinger, Werner X. Uehlinger

Steve Lacy chronology
Itinerary (1991)	Remains (1992)	Live at Sweet Basil (1992)

Remains is a solo album by soprano saxophonist Steve Lacy, recorded in Switzerland in 1991 and first released on the hat ART label the following year.

== Music and reception ==
Professional ratings
Review scores
Source	Rating
AllMusic	4/5 stars
The Penguin Guide to Jazz	3.5/4 stars

The first six tracks form a suite that was inspired by the Tao Te Ching. The title track is a dance piece commissioned from Lacy, who described it as "a danse macabre of a skeleton in a tomb". The album also contains a reworking of Lacy's "The Way" that would surprise listeners with how it was changed from earlier performances, he suggested.

The Penguin Guide to Jazz praised the "close-up, attentive recording [that] catches every gritty little resonance and breath noise" and described the album as "Lacy's most accomplished solo performance for some time". The AllMusic review by Scott Yanow stated, "On this solo soprano saxophone CD, the remarkable Steve Lacy performs his six-song, half-hour 'Time of Tao-Cycle', plus three other originals ... The improvising is thoughtful, adventurous, and sometimes wandering, but rarely aimless. For specialized tastes".

== Track listing ==
All compositions by Steve Lacy except where noted

1. "Existence" – 5:25
2. "The Way" – 6:46
3. "Bone" – 4:14
4. "Name" – 6:34
5. "The Breath" – 4:57
6. "Life on Its Way" – 2:49
7. "Pearl Street" – 5:15
8. "Remains" – 18:05
9. "Afterglow" – 6:11
10. "Epistrophy" (Thelonious Monk, Kenny Clarke) – 3:59

== Personnel ==
- Steve Lacy – soprano saxophone
