= The Super Quartet Live at Sweet Basil =

Live album by Mal Waldron & Steve Lacy
- Released: 1987
- Recorded: August 28 & 29, 1987
- Genre: Jazz
- Length: 45:55
- Label: Paddle Wheel
- Producer: Shigeyuki Kawashima

Mal Waldron chronology
Remembering the Moment (1987)	The Super Quartet Live at Sweet Basil (1987)	Mal, Dance and Soul (1987)

Steve Lacy chronology
Momentum (1987)	The Super Quartet Live at Sweet Basil (1987)	The Window (1987)

The Super Quartet Live at Sweet Basil is a live album by jazz pianist Mal Waldron featuring soprano saxophonist Steve Lacy recorded at Sweet Basil in New York City in 1987 and released on the Japanese Paddle Wheel label.

== Reception ==
The Allmusic review by Henry M. Shteamer awarded the album 4 stars stating " Live at Sweet Basil is highly recommended as an introduction to both Waldron and Lacy, as these performances reveal the quirks of each of their styles in a peppy, yet very profound setting".

Professional ratings
Review scores
Source	Rating
Allmusic	4/5 stars

== Track listing ==
All compositions by Mal Waldron except as indicated

1. "What It Is" — 12:19
2. "Evidence" (Thelonious Monk) — 10:52
3. "Snake Out" — 15:21
4. "Let's Call This" (Monk) — 7:23

- Recorded at Sweet Basil in New York City on August 28 & 29, 1987

== Personnel ==
- Mal Waldron — piano
- Steve Lacy — soprano saxophone
- Reggie Workman — bass
- Eddie Moore — drums
