= We See =

Wee See

Live album by Steve Lacy 6
- Released: 1993
- Recorded: September 1–2, 1992
- Venue: Mohren-Saal, Willisau, Switzerland
- Genre: Jazz
- Length: 58:38
- Label: hat ART hat ART CD 6127
- Producer: Werner X. Uehlinger

Steve Lacy chronology
Clangs (1992)	Wee See (1993)	Three Blokes (1992)

We See, subtitled Thelonious Monk Songbook, is a live album by soprano saxophonist Steve Lacy, recorded in Switzerland in 1992 and first released on the hat ART label in 1993. The album was rereleased in 2002 with an additional track from the concert.

== Reception ==
Professional ratings
Review scores
Source	Rating
AllMusic	4/5 stars
The Penguin Guide to Jazz Recordings	3/4 stars

The AllMusic review by Glenn Astarita stated, "Essentially, this a relatively straightforward set consisting of moderate to up-tempo swing vamps, accelerated by the saxophonist's gleaming choruses and Monk-like permutations. Lacy and associates perform these works with a deeply personalized and undeniably buoyant demeanor ... this effort shines forth with the qualities that might parallel the birth of a sun-drenched summer's day". BBC Music's John Eyles called it "one of the essential Lacy discs" and observed "throughout his massive discography, Lacy has repeatedly returned to the compositions of Monk. From his earliest group albums such as Reflections, Evidence and School Days, through solo recordings like Only Monk and More Monk, to the recent Monk's Dream - a period of well over forty years - Lacy has established himself as the greatest Monk interpreter, bar none. In the process, Lacy has kept Monk's compositions in the spotlight and immeasurably enhanced Monk's reputation as a composer. True symbiosis".

== Track listing ==
All compositions by Thelonious Monk except where noted

1. "We See" – 6:56
2. "Shuffle Boil" – 4:31
3. "Evidence" – 6:07
4. "Reflections" – 3:28
5. "Ruby, My Dear" – 4:43
6. "Eronel" – 3:52
7. "Monk's Mood" – 5:31
8. "Thelonious" – 5:32 Additional track on CD reissue
9. "Misterioso" – 7:55
10. "Well, You Needn't" – 7:33
11. "Hanky-Panky" (Steve Lacy) – 8:02

== Personnel ==
- Steve Lacy – soprano saxophone
- Steve Potts – alto saxophone, soprano saxophone
- Hans Kennel – trumpet, flugelhorn
- Sonhando Estwick – vibes
- Jean-Jacques Avenel – bass
- John Betsch – drums
