= Sempre Amore =

Studio album by Steve Lacy & Mal Waldron
- Released: 1987
- Recorded: February 17, 1986
- Genre: Jazz
- Length: 43:14
- Label: Soul Note
- Producer: Giovanni Bonandrini

Mal Waldron chronology
Space (1986)	Sempre Amore (1987)	Update (1986)

Steve Lacy chronology
Only Monk (1987)	Sempre Amore (1986)	Morning Joy (1986)

Sempre Amore is an album by Steve Lacy and Mal Waldron, released on the Italian Soul Note label in 1987. It features duo performances of tunes written by Duke Ellington and Billy Strayhorn.

== Reception ==
The AllMusic review by Scott Yanow stated, "Although adventurous in spots, their interpretations of such pieces as 'Johnny Come Lately', 'Prelude to a Kiss' and 'Smada' are quite respectful and keep the strong melodies in mind. Recommended".

Professional ratings
Review scores
Source	Rating
AllMusic	4/5 stars
The Penguin Guide to Jazz Recordings	4/4 stars

== Track listing ==
1. "Johnny Come Lately" (Strayhorn) - 6:40
2. "Prelude to a Kiss" (Ellington, Gordon, Mills) - 5:32
3. "Star-Crossed Lovers" (Strayhorn, Ellington) - 4:30
4. "To the Bitter" (Ellington) - 5:17
5. "Azure" (Ellington, Mills) - 4:17
6. "Sempre Amore" (Ellington) - 4:42
7. "A Flower Is a Lovesome Thing" (Strayhorn) - 5:14
8. "Smada" (Strayhorn, Ellington) - 7:02

- Recorded February 17, 1986, at Barigozzi Studio, Milan

== Personnel ==
- Steve Lacy - soprano saxophone
- Mal Waldron - piano
