= John Betsch =

American jazz drummer

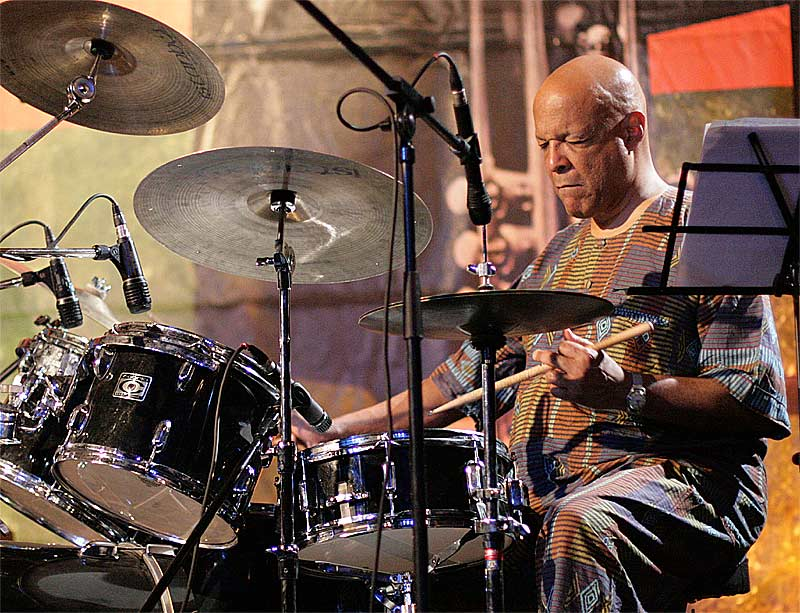
John Betsch in concert (2007, Bucharest)

John Betsch (born October 8, 1945) is an American jazz drummer.

== Biography ==
Betsch was born in Jacksonville, Florida. His family belonged to the African-American upper class; his grandfather was the black millionaire Abraham Lincoln Lewis and his grandmother Mary's ancestors included the English colonist Zephaniah Kingsley and Anna Kingsley, an African princess.

His mother was a church organist and pianist, and his older sister Marvyne a soprano singer. He began playing drums in the school orchestra at the age of nine. He attended Fisk University, and while still a student there, at the age of 18, he began playing professionally with pianists Bob Holmes, Ernest Vantrease, and trumpeter Louis Smith. Betsch studied at Berklee College of Music and the University of Massachusetts-Amherst under Max Roach and Archie Shepp. After playing in organ trios, he released an album as a leader, Earth Blossom, in 1975. That year he moved to New York City, where he played with Marion Brown, Paul Jeffrey, Max Roach, Jeanne Lee and Henry Threadgill.

Between 1977 and 1979 Betsch joined Abdullah Ibrahim's ensemble, and from 1980 to 1982 he was with Archie Shepp's band that featured Hilton Ruiz, piano, Santi Debriano, bass and Roger Dawson, congas and percussion. In 1983 he recorded with Roger Dawson's septet featuring Hilton Ruiz, reedman John Purcell, trumpeter Claudio Roditi, bassist Anthony Cox and multi-percussionist Milton Cardona. Following this he was a member of quartets led by Marty Cook.

Since 1985 Betsch has lived in Europe, playing with Jim Pepper and Mal Waldron as well as in a band with his wife, French pianist Claudine François. In the 1990s he played in a group with Steve Lacy, and with Özay Fecht and in a trio with Elvira Plenar and Peter Kowald. He has done other recordings with Thomas Chapin, Marilyn Crispell, Klaus König, Billy Bang, Sathima Bea Benjamin, Uli Lenz and Simon Nabatov.

== Discography ==
=== As leader ===
- Earth Blossom (Strata-East, 1974)

=== As sideman ===
With Billy Bang

- The Fire from Within (Soul Note, 1984)

With Marilyn Crispell

- Spirit Music (Cadence, 1983)

With Abdullah Ibrahim

- The Journey (Chiaroscuro, 1977)

With Steve Lacy

- Anthem (RCA Novus, 1990)
- Itinerary (hat ART, 1991)
- Live at Sweet Basil (RCA Novus, 1992)
- Clangs (hat ART, 1993)
- We See (hat ART, 1993)
- Revenue (Soul Note, 1993)
- Vespers (Soul Note, 1993)
- Monk's Dream (Verve, 2000)

With Uli Lenz

- Good-bye Venus (Tutu, 2005)

With David Murray

- Flowers Around Cleveland (Bleu Regard, 1995)

With Simon Nabatov

- Inside Lookin' Out (Tutu, 1989)

With Jim Pepper

- Dakota Song (Enja, 1987)
- The Path (Enja)
- Remembrance (Tutu 1990)
- Live at New Morning, Paris (Tutu 1999)

With Roswell Rudd

- Broad Strokes (Knitting Factory, 2000)

With Henry Threadgill

- When Was That? (About Time, 1982)

With Mal Waldron

- Mal, Dance and Soul (Tutu, 1987)
- No More Tears (For Lady Day) (Timeless, 1988)
- Quadrologue at Utopia (Tutu, 1989)
- More Git' Go at Utopia (Tutu 1989)
- Spring in Prague (Alfa Jazz, 1990)

With Marty Cook

- Red, White, Black and Blue (Enja, 1987)
