= Where Are You? (Mal Waldron album) =

Studio album by Mal Waldron
- Released: 1989
- Recorded: June 10, 1989
- Genre: Jazz
- Length: 58:56
- Label: Soul Note
- Producer: Giovanni Bonandrini

Mal Waldron chronology
Crowd Scene (1988)	Where Are You? (1989)	Quadrologue at Utopia (1989)

Where Are You? is an album by jazz pianist Mal Waldron, recorded in 1989 and released on the Italian Soul Note label.

== Reception ==
The AllMusic review by Ron Wynn stated: "Mal Waldron's mellow and sentimental side is tapped on this session... A less demonstrative, but still quite enjoyable, Mal Waldron date."

Professional ratings
Review scores
Source	Rating
AllMusic	3/5 stars
Tom Hull	B+
The Penguin Guide to Jazz Recordings	3.5/4 stars

== Track listing ==
All compositions by Mal Waldron except as indicated

1. "Where Are You?" [take 1] (Harold Adamson, Jimmy McHugh) — 5:12
2. "Waltz for Marianne" — 21:56
3. "Wha's Nine?" (Reggie Workman) — 22:10
4. "Where Are You?" [take 2] (Adamson, McHugh) — 9:38

- Recorded in New York City on June 10, 1989

== Personnel ==
- Mal Waldron — piano
- Sonny Fortune — alto saxophone
- Ricky Ford — tenor saxophone
- Reggie Workman — bass
- Eddie Moore — drums
