= The Gleam =

Studio album by Steve Lacy Sextet
- Released: 1987
- Recorded: July 16–18, 1986
- Studio: Sound Ideas, NYC
- Genre: Jazz
- Length: 58:00
- Label: Silkheart (SHLP 102)
- Producer: Steve Lacy

Steve Lacy chronology
One Fell Swoop (1986)	The Gleam (1987)	Flim-Flam (1986)

The Gleam is an album by saxophonist Steve Lacy's Sextet, recorded in 1986 and released on the Swedish Silkheart label.

== Reception ==
Professional ratings
Review scores
Source	Rating
AllMusic	4/5 stars
The Penguin Guide to Jazz	3/4 stars

The Penguin Guide to Jazz stated that "it's another perfectly acceptable quartet performance for enthusiasts, and the two takes of 'Napping' provide much to think about" In his review on AllMusic, Scott Yanow stated: "This Silkheart release has one of the finest all-around recordings by Steve Lacy's Sextet ... all five compositions are Lacy originals. Overall, this set gives listeners a particularly strong example of the work of the innovative Steve Lacy Sextet.".

== Track listing ==
All compositions by Steve Lacy

1. "Gay Paree Bop" – 9:04
2. "Napping" – 8:58
3. "The Gleam" – 7:41
4. "As Usual" – 12:03
5. "Keepsake" – 10:22
6. "Napping" [Take 2] – 10:28 Bonus track on CD

== Personnel ==
- Steve Lacy – soprano saxophone
- Steve Potts – alto saxophone, soprano saxophone
- Bobby Few – piano
- Irene Aebi – violin, vocals
- Jean-Jacques Avenel – double bass
- Oliver Johnson – drums
