= Left Alone '86 =

Live album by Mal Waldron & Jackie McLean
- Released: 1987
- Recorded: September 1, 1986
- Genre: Jazz
- Length: 62:27
- Label: Paddle Wheel
- Producer: Akira Tsuchikura

Mal Waldron chronology
Update (1986)	Left Alone '86 (1987)	The Git Go – Live at the Village Vanguard (1986)

Jackie McLean chronology
It's About Time (1985)	Left Alone '86 (1987)	Dynasty (1988)

Left Alone '86 is an album by jazz pianist Mal Waldron and saxophonist Jackie McLean released on the Japanese Paddle Wheel label in 1986. The album is a sequel to Waldron's 1959 recording Left Alone, on which McLean played on the title track.

== Reception ==
The AllMusic review by Ron Wynn awarded the album 4½ stars stating "Although he cannot maintain the same nonstop pace he had in the early '60s, Jackie McLean still plays magnificently. He demonstrated that repeatedly on this 1986 duo date with pianist Mal Waldron, whose lovely countermelodies, complementary solos, darting phrases, and supporting accompaniment proved a perfect contrast to McLean's forays. He is lyrical and engaging on some tracks; his explosive side emerges on others".

Professional ratings
Review scores
Source	Rating
AllMusic	4.5/5 stars

== Track listing ==
All compositions by Mal Waldron except as indicated

1. "Left Alone" (Billie Holiday, Mal Waldron) — 8:27
2. "God Bless the Child" (Herzog, Holiday) — 3:23
3. "All of Me" (Gerald Marks, Seymour Simons) — 6:49
4. "Catwalk" — 9:47
5. "Lover Man" (Jimmy Davis, Ram Ramirez, James Sherman) — 3:36
6. "Minor Pulsation" — 12:27
7. "Good Morning Heartache" (Ervin Drake, Dan Fisher, Irene Higginbotham) — 3:19
8. "All Alone" — 3:30
9. "Super Okra Blues" (Jackie McLean) — 5:06
10. "Left Alone" [alternate take] (Holiday, Waldron) — 6:03

- Recorded at U-Port Kan'i Hoken Hall in Tokyo, Japan on September 1, 1986

== Personnel ==
- Mal Waldron — piano
- Jackie McLean — alto saxophone (tracks 1–7, 9 & 10)
- Herbie Lewis — bass (tracks 1–7, 9 & 10)
- Eddie Moore — drums (tracks 1–7, 9 & 10)
