= Spring in Prague =

Spring in Prague (film)

Studio album by Mal Waldron
- Released: 1990
- Recorded: February 19 & 20, 1990
- Genre: Jazz
- Length: 49:38
- Label: Alfa Jazz

Mal Waldron chronology
More Git' Go at Utopia (1989)	Spring in Prague (film) (1990)	Hot House (1990)

Spring in Prague is an album by jazz pianist Mal Waldron recorded in 1990 and released on the Japanese Alfa Jazz label.

== Track listing ==
All compositions by Mal Waldron except as indicated

1. "Revolution" – 6:05
2. "East of the Sun" – 7:57
3. "Let us Live - dedicated to East-Germany" – 6:12
4. "Spring in Prague" – 7:00
5. "On a Clear Day" – 6:42
6. "Spring is Here" (Lorenz Hart, Richard Rodgers) – 5:35
7. "We Demand" – 10:07

- Recorded in Munich, West Germany on February 19 & 20, 1990

== Personnel ==
- Mal Waldron — piano
- Paulo Cardoso — bass
- John Betsch — drums
