= Momentum (Steve Lacy album) =

Studio album by Steve Lacy
- Released: 1987
- Recorded: May 20–22, 1987
- Studio: Family Sound, Paris
- Genre: Jazz
- Length: 63:06
- Label: RCA Novus
- Producer: Ed Michel

Steve Lacy chronology
Flim-Flam (1986)	Momentum (1987)	The Super Quartet Live at Sweet Basil (1987)

Momentum is an album by Steve Lacy which was released on the RCA Novus label in 1987 and features six of Lacy's compositions (although tracks 2 and 3 only appeared on the CD edition) with texts by Giulia Niccolai, Herman Melville, and Brion Gysin performed by Lacy, Bobby Few, Steve Potts, Jean-Jacques Avenel, Oliver Johnson, and Irene Aebi.

== Reception ==
The Allmusic review by Scott Yanow awarded the album 4½ stars stating, "On Steve Lacy's first album for an American label in over a decade, his sextet is heard on four extensive originals by the great soprano saxophonist. The music is complex yet often melodic, and, although Irene Aebi takes typically eccentric vocals on two of the songs, the main reasons to acquire this album are for the thoughtful yet unpredictable solos of Lacy and altoist Steve Potts. ".

Professional ratings
Review scores
Source	Rating
Allmusic	4.5/5 stars

== Track listing ==
All compositions by Steve Lacy except where noted.

1. "The Bath" – 13:03
2. "The Gaze" – 11:10
3. "Utah" (text by Giulia Niccolai) – 6:58
4. "Art" (text by Herman Melville) – 8:56
5. "Momentum" – 7:58
6. "The Song" (text by Brion Gysin) – 15:02

== Personnel ==
- Steve Lacy – soprano saxophone, tambourine
- Bobby Few – piano
- Steve Potts – alto and soprano saxophones, tambourine
- Jean-Jacques Avenel – bass
- Oliver Johnson – drums
- Irene Aebi – vocals, violin, cello
