= Itinerary (album) =

Live album by Steve Lacy + 16
- Released: 1991
- Recorded: November 26–28, 1990
- Venue: Listen to Lacy Festival, Haus der Begegnung Mariahilf, Vienna, Switzerland
- Genre: Jazz
- Length: 53:05
- Label: hat ART hat ART CD 6079
- Producer: Pia Uehlinger, Werner X. Uehlinger

Steve Lacy chronology
Hot House (1991)	Itinerary (1991)	Remains (1991)

Itinerary is a live album by soprano saxophonist Steve Lacy, which was recorded in Vienna in 1990 and first released on the hat ART label in 1991.

== Reception ==
Professional ratings
Review scores
Source	Rating
Allmusic	5/5 stars

The Allmusic review by Thom Jurek stated "With the various timbres and modal inventions that erupt from Lacy's charts, feeling is at their root, an optimism that expresses music as an end to transformation, a manner of transferring the emotion necessary to conceive change. And on Itinerary, Lacy juxtaposes numerous kinds of music to achieve that end: European classical music and its 20th century cousin, free blowing, sweetly swinging group and individual approaches to the entire history of jazz, film, and even poetry. This is a side of Lacy no one had ever heard before, and it's too bad it's not a direction he continued to pursue on a larger scale over a longer period of time. These recordings may be over a decade old, but they still point the way to a bright and shining musical vision for the future".

== Track listing ==
All compositions by Steve Lacy

1. "I Feel a Draft" – 4:04
2. "Cloudy" – 5:56
3. "Rain" – 6:01
4. "The Sun" – 5:46
5. "Moon" – 7:19
6. "Sweet 16" – 14:05
7. "Itinerary" – 9:48

== Personnel ==
- Steve Lacy – soprano saxophone
- Steve Potts – alto saxophone, soprano saxophone
- Bobby Few – piano
- Irene Aebi – cello, violin, vocals
- Jean-Jacques Avenel – bass
- John Betsch – drums
- Andreas Kolbe – flute, piccolo
- Urs Leimgruber – soprano saxophone, tenor saxophone
- Hans Steiner – bass clarinet
- Franz Koglmann – flugelhorn
- Klaus Peham – trumpet
- Glenn Ferris – trombone
- Radu Malfatti – trombone
- Raoul Herget – tuba
- Burkhard Stangl – guitar
- Gyde Knebusch – harp
- Sam Kelly – percussion
- Gustave Bauer – conductor
