= Mal Waldron with the Steve Lacy Quintet =

Studio album by Mal Waldron & Steve Lacy
- Released: 1972
- Recorded: May 1972
- Genre: Jazz
- Length: 61:34
- Label: America

Mal Waldron chronology
Mal Waldron on Steinway (1972)	Mal Waldron with the Steve Lacy Quintet (1972)	The Whirling Dervish (1972)

Steve Lacy chronology
Journey Without End (1971)	Mal Waldron with the Steve Lacy Quintet (1972)	The Gap (1972)

Professional ratings
Review scores
Source	Rating
The Penguin Guide to Jazz Recordings	3/4 stars

Mal Waldron with the Steve Lacy Quintet is an album by American jazz pianist Mal Waldron and soprano saxophonist Steve Lacy released on the French America label in 1972. The original LP release featured three tracks and the 2005 CD reissue added two alternate takes.

== Track listing ==
All compositions by Steve Lacy except as indicated

1. “Vio” (Mal Waldron) - 18:24
2. “Jump for Victor” - 8:54
3. “Blue Wee” - 12:32
4. “Vio” [alternate take] (Waldron) - 12:37
5. “Jump for Victor” [alternate take] - 9:07

- Recorded in Paris, May 1972

== Personnel ==
- Steve Lacy - soprano saxophone
- Mal Waldron - piano
- Steve Potts - soprano & alto saxophones
- Irene Aebi - cello, voice
- Kent Carter - double bass
- Noel McGhee - drums & percussion
