= More Monk =

Studio album by Steve Lacy
- Released: 1991
- Recorded: April 18–19, 1989
- Studio: Barigozzi, Milan
- Genre: Jazz
- Length: 55:40
- Label: Soul Note
- Producer: Giovanni Bonandrini

Steve Lacy chronology
Steve Lacy Solo (1991)	More Monk (1991)	Flim-Flam (1991)

More Monk is an album by Steve Lacy. It features solo saxophone performances of eleven tunes written by Thelonious Monk.

== Recording and music ==
The album was recorded at Barigozzi Studio, Milan, on April 18–19, 1989. All of the eleven pieces were composed by Thelonious Monk, and played as solo soprano saxophone performances by Steve Lacy.

== Releases and reception ==
Professional ratings
Review scores
Source	Rating
AllMusic	4.5/5 stars
The Penguin Guide to Jazz	4/4 stars

More Monk was released by Soul Note in 1991. The Penguin Guide to Jazz suggested that the album was more accessible than Only Monk, an earlier solo Lacy album of Monk compositions, and most of the material was more commonly played. More Monk was also released in 2011 as part of the 6-CD Solos Duos Trios: The Complete Remastered Recordings on Soul Note.

== Track listing ==
1. "Shuffle Boil" - 4:42
2. "Straight, No Chaser" - 4:31
3. "Off Minor" - 5:20
4. "Ruby My Dear" - 6:32
5. "In Walked Bud" - 4:16
6. "Trinkle Tinkle" - 5:00
7. "Comin' on the Hudson" - 6:27
8. "Introspection" - 6:10
9. "Jackie-ing" - 4:10
10. "Crepuscule with Nellie" - 4:00
11. "Bye-ya" - 4:32

All compositions by Thelonious Monk

== Personnel ==
- Steve Lacy - soprano saxophone
