= Let's Call This... Esteem =

Live album by Steve Lacy & Mal Waldron
- Released: 1993
- Recorded: May 16, 1993
- Venue: Playhouse Theatre, Oxford, England
- Genre: Jazz
- Length: 78:06
- Label: Slam
- Producer: George Haslam

Steve Lacy chronology
Three Blokes (1992)	Let's Call This... Esteem (1993)	Vespers (1993)

Mal Waldron chronology
I Remember Thelonious (1991)	Let's Call This... Esteem (1993)	My Dear Family (1993)

Let's Call This... Esteem is a live album by soprano saxophonist Steve Lacy and pianist Mal Waldron, recorded in Oxford in 1993 and released on the Slam label.

== Reception ==
Professional ratings
Review scores
Source	Rating
AllMusic	4.5/5 stars
The Penguin Guide to Jazz Recordings	3.5/4 stars

The AllMusic review by Steve Loewy stated: "While this one differs only minutely from some of the other collaborations between these two outstanding musicians, the rewards are plentiful, and both the novice and experienced listener will thrill to the nuanced excitement."

== Track listing ==
1. Introduction/"Let's Call This..." (Thelonious Monk) – 6:59
2. "Monk's Dream" (Monk) – 5:23
3. "In a Sentimental Mood" (Duke Ellington, Manny Kurtz, Irving Mills) – 8:17
4. "Snake Out" (Mal Waldron) – 14:00
5. "Blues for Aida" (Steve Lacy) – 7:27
6. "Johnny Come Lately" (Billy Strayhorn) – 6:53
7. "What It Is" (Waldron) – 9:05
8. "Evidence" (Monk) – 6:55
9. "Epistrophy" (Monk, Kenny Clarke) – 5:17
10. "Esteem" (Lacy) – 7:50

== Personnel ==
- Steve Lacy – soprano saxophone
- Mal Waldron – piano
