= Three Blokes =

Live album by Lol Coxhill, Steve Lacy and Evan Parker
- Released: August 11, 1994
- Recorded: September 25–27, 1992
- Venue: Charlottenburg Town Hall, Berlin, Germany
- Genre: Jazz
- Length: 72:26
- Label: FMP; FMP CD 63
- Producer: Jost Gebers

Lol Coxhill chronology
Solos East West (1991)	Three Blokes (1994)	Halim (1993)

Steve Lacy chronology
We See (1992)	Three Blokes (1992)	Let's Call This... Esteem (1993)

Evan Parker chronology
Process and Reality (1991)	Three Blokes (1992)	Conic Sections (1993)

Three Blokes is a live album by saxophonists Lol Coxhill, Steve Lacy and Evan Parker, recorded in Berlin in 1992 and first released on the FMP label in 1994.

== Reception ==
Professional ratings
Review scores
Source	Rating
AllMusic	4.5/5 stars
The Encyclopedia of Popular Music	4/5 stars
The Penguin Guide to Jazz Recordings	3.5/4 stars

AllMusic reviewer Thom Jurek states, "This album documents three nights of a soprano saxophone throw-down in 1988 [sic] by three of the world's most infamous practitioners of the improviser's art on the instrument -- with Lacy being the unquestioned king of the straight horn. All the players led for one night; each grouped together all of the possible combinations in solo and duet forms, and then performed a brief trio piece as an encore. ... Three Blokes is not only compelling, it's riveting".

The authors of Masters of Jazz Saxophone described the album as "a beautifully-recorded, unadorned three-soprano encounter."

== Track listing ==
1. "The Crawl" (Evan Parker, Steve Lacy) – 16:27
2. "Backslash" (Parker, Lacy) – 7:31
3. "Glanced" (Lol Coxhill, Lacy) – 21:36
4. "Broad Brush" (Parker, Coxhill) – 23:00
5. "Three Blokes" (Lacy) – 3:53

== Personnel ==
- Lol Coxhill – soprano saxophone (tracks 3–5)
- Steve Lacy – soprano saxophone (tracks 1–3 & 5)
- Evan Parker – soprano saxophone (tracks 1, 2, 4 & 5)
