= More Git' Go at Utopia =

Live album by Mal Waldron
- Released: 1994
- Recorded: October 25 & 26, 1989
- Genre: Jazz
- Length: 68:49
- Label: Tutu
- Producer: Peter Wiessmueller

Mal Waldron chronology
| Quadrologue at Utopia (1989) | More Git' Go at Utopia (1994) | Spring in Prague (1990) |

More Git' Go at Utopia is a live album by jazz pianist Mal Waldron featuring Jim Pepper recorded in 1989 and released on the German Tutu label.

== Track listing ==
All compositions by Mal Waldron except as indicated

1. "More Git' Go at Utopia" — 20:43
2. "Warm Puppies/Reflexion in Monk" (Jim Pepper) — 11:24
3. "You Open My Eyes" — 9:42
4. "Misreal Breeze #2" — 9:47
5. "Dancing on the Flames" — 17:13

- Recorded at the Utopia Club in Innsbruck, Austria on October 25 & 26, 1989

== Personnel ==
- Mal Waldron — piano
- Jim Pepper — tenor saxophone, soprano saxophone
- Ed Schuller — bass
- John Betsch — drums
