= Live at Sweet Basil (Steve Lacy album) =

Live album by Steve Lacy Sextet
- Released: 1992
- Recorded: July 6–7, 1991
- Venue: Sweet Basil, NYC
- Genre: Jazz
- Length: 69:01
- Label: RCA Novus; PD90647
- Producer: John Snyder

Steve Lacy chronology
Remains (1991)	Live at Sweet Basil (1992)	Spirit of Mingus (1992)

Live at Sweet Basil is a live album by saxophonist Steve Lacy's Sextet, which was recorded in New York in 1991 and first released on the RCA Novus label in 1992.

== Reception ==
Professional ratings
Review scores
Source	Rating
Allmusic	4.5/5 stars

The Allmusic review by Scott Yanow stated "This live set is an excellent example of the group's unique music performed live. The versions of Lacy's five scalar originals are each at least ten minutes long and find the musicians playing with enthusiasm and consistent creativity. Their relaxed but adventurous solo and ensemble work make this a set worth several listens".

== Track listing ==
All compositions by Steve Lacy with lyrics as noted

1. "Prospectus" (words by Blaise Cendrars) – 10:48
2. "The Bath" – 12:38
3. "Morning Joy" (words by Bob Kaufman) – 16:11
4. "The Wane" – 14:55
5. "Blinks" – 14:29

== Personnel ==
- Steve Lacy – soprano saxophone
- Steve Potts – alto saxophone, soprano saxophone
- Bobby Few – piano
- Irene Aebi – violin, voice
- Jean-Jacques Avenel – bass
- John Betsch – drums
