= Quadrologue at Utopia =

Live album by Mal Waldron
- Released: 1990
- Recorded: October 25 & 26, 1989
- Genre: Jazz
- Length: 72:27
- Label: Tutu
- Producer: Horst Weber

Mal Waldron chronology
Where Are You? (1989)	Quadrologue at Utopia (1990)	More Git' Go at Utopia (1989)

Quadrologue at Utopia is a live album by jazz pianist Mal Waldron featuring Jim Pepper recorded in 1989 and released on the German Tutu label.

== Reception ==
Allmusic awarded the album 3 stars.

Professional ratings
Review scores
Source	Rating
Allmusic	3/5 stars

== Track listing ==
All compositions by Mal Waldron except as indicated

1. "Ticket to Utopia" — 20:31
2. "Time for Duke" — 11:35
3. "Never in a Hurry" — 15:38
4. "Mistral Breeze, No. 1" — 10:25
5. "Funny Glasses & A Moustache" (Jim Pepper, Mal Waldron) — 15:50

- Recorded at the Utopia Club in Innsbruck, Austria on October 25 & 26, 1989

== Personnel ==
- Mal Waldron — piano
- Jim Pepper — tenor saxophone, soprano saxophone
- Ed Schuller — bass
- John Betsch — drums
