= Moon (Steve Lacy album) =

1969 studio album

Studio album by Steve Lacy
- Released: 1969
- Recorded: September 23, 1969
- Genre: Jazz
- Length: 28:49
- Label: BYG Actuel

Steve Lacy chronology
Roba (1969)	Moon (1969)	Epistrophy (1969)

Moon is the ninth album by soprano saxophonist Steve Lacy and was recorded in Rome in 1969 and originally released on the BYG Actuel label featuring five compositions by Lacy performed by Lacy, Italo Toni, Claudo Volonte, Irene Aebi, Marcello Melis and Jacques Thollot.

== Reception ==
The Allmusic review by Scott Yanow awarded the album 3 stars stating "Lacy had not yet fully developed his more relaxed, scalar approach to improvising, but his playing is certainly quite distinctive and generally pretty lyrical during performances of five Lacy originals.".

Professional ratings
Review scores
Source	Rating
Allmusic	3/5 stars

== Track listing ==
1. "Hit" - 4:58
2. "Note" - 4:27
3. "Moon" - 7:30
4. "Laugh" - 3:47
5. "The Breath" - 8:07

All compositions by Steve Lacy
- Recorded in Rome, Italy in September 1969

== Personnel ==
- Steve Lacy - soprano saxophone
- Italo Toni - trombone
- Claudio Volonte - clarinet
- Irene Aebi - cello
- Jacques Thollot - drums
- Marcello Melis - bass
