= Vespers (album) =

Studio album by Steve Lacy Octet
- Released: 1993
- Recorded: July 5, 6, 7 & 9, 1993
- Genre: Jazz
- Length: 51:02
- Label: Soul Note
- Producer: Giovanni Bonandrini

Steve Lacy chronology
Let's Call This... Esteem (1993)	Vespers (1993)	The Rendezvous (1994)

Vespers is an album by soprano saxophonist Steve Lacy, recorded in 1993 and released on the Italian Soul Note label. The album features lyrics by Blaga Dimitrova.

== Reception ==
The AllMusic review by Scott Yanow noted the "interesting tone colors and harmonies and consistently stimulating solos... Well worth exploring".

Professional ratings
Review scores
Source	Rating
AllMusic	4/5 stars
The Penguin Guide to Jazz Recordings	4/4 stars

== Track listing ==
All compositions by Steve Lacy

1. "Multidimensional" - 6:59
2. "If We Come Close" - 8:25
3. "Grass" - 9:24
4. "Wait for Tomorrow" - 4:35
5. "Across" - 5:58
6. "I Do Not Believe" - 9:26
7. "Vespers" - 6:15

- Recorded at Sear Sound in New York City on July 5, 6, 7 & 9, 1993

== Personnel ==
- Steve Lacy - soprano saxophone
- Steve Potts - alto saxophone, soprano saxophone
- Tom Varner - French horn
- Ricky Ford - tenor saxophone
- Bobby Few - piano
- Jean-Jacques Avenel - bass
- John Betsch - drums
- Irene Aebi - voice
