= Troubles (album) =

Studio album by Steve Lacy
- Released: 1979
- Recorded: May 24–25, 1979
- Genre: Jazz
- Length: 38:38
- Label: Black Saint
- Producer: Giovanni Bonandrini

Steve Lacy chronology
Eronel (1979)	Troubles (1979)	Shots (1980)

Troubles is the second album by Steve Lacy, released on the Italian Black Saint label. It features performances of five of Lacy's compositions by Lacy, Steve Potts, Irene Aebi, Kent Carter and Oliver Johnson.

== Reception ==
The AllMusic review by Scott Yanow stated: "This fairly obscure effort from the Steve Lacy Quintet of 1979 features the great soprano saxophonist in typically exploratory yet thoughtful form on five originals. His interplay with the underrated altoist Steve Potts (who doubles on soprano) is the main reason to acquire the set, while violinist/vocalist Irene Aebi's contributions are typically eccentric and an acquired taste. Bassist Kent Carter and drummer Oliver Johnson are stimulating throughout, particularly in support of the vocal choir on the precious serious/hilarious title track and the more stern 'No Baby'."

Professional ratings
Review scores
Source	Rating
AllMusic	4.5/5 stars
The Penguin Guide to Jazz Recordings	2.5/4 stars
The Rolling Stone Jazz Record Guide	2/5 stars

== Track listing ==
1. "Troubles" - 6:34
2. "Wasted" - 10:07
3. "The Whammies!" - 2:58
4. "Blues" - 12:52
5. "No Baby" - 6:07

All compositions by Steve Lacy
- Recorded at Barigozzi Studios, Milan, Italy, on May 24 and 25, 1979

== Personnel ==
- Steve Lacy - soprano saxophone
- Steve Potts - alto and soprano saxophones
- Irene Aebi - cello, violin, vocals
- Kent Carter - bass, cello
- Oliver Johnson - drums
