= Update (Mal Waldron album) =

Studio album by Mal Waldron
- Released: 1987
- Recorded: March 10, 1986
- Genre: Jazz
- Length: 56:36
- Label: Soul Note
- Producer: Giovanni Bonandrini

Mal Waldron chronology
Sempre Amore (1986)	Update (1987)	Left Alone '86 (1986)

Update is an album by jazz pianist Mal Waldron, released on the Italian Soul Note label in 1987. It features solo performances recorded in Milan, Italy.

== Reception ==
The AllMusic review by Scott Yanow stated: "This solo set by pianist Mal Waldron serves as a perfect introduction to his unique style during the more recent part of his career... It is always very interesting to hear musicians who started out in straightforward hard bop stretching themselves and playing quite freely. This recording rewards repeated listenings."

Professional ratings
Review scores
Source	Rating
AllMusic	4.5/5 stars
The Penguin Guide to Jazz	3.5/4 stars

== Track listing ==
All compositions by Mal Waldron except as indicated

1. "Free for C. T." — 16:05
2. "A Night in Tunisia" (Dizzy Gillespie) — 6:09
3. "The Inchworm" (Frank Loesser) — 5:55
4. 'Variations on a Theme by Cecil Taylor" — 14:48
5. "You're Getting to Be a Habit with Me" (Al Dubin, Harry Warren) — 5:16
6. "I Should Care" (Axel Stordahl, Paul Weston, Sammy Cahn) — 8:42

- Recorded at Barigozzi Studio in Milan, Italy, on March 10, 1986

recorded at MurecStudio ex Barigozzi Studio

== Personnel ==
- Mal Waldron – piano
