= Communiqué (Steve Lacy and Mal Waldron album) =

Studio album by Steve Lacy & Mal Waldron
- Released: 1997
- Recorded: March 8–9, 1994
- Genre: Jazz
- Length: 63:54
- Label: Soul Note
- Producer: Giovanni Bonandrini

Steve Lacy chronology
The Rendezvous (1994)	Communiqué (1997)	5 x Monk 5 x Lacy (1994)

Communiqué is an album by Steve Lacy and Mal Waldron, released on the Italian Soul Note label in 1997. It features duo performances of tunes written by Thelonious Monk, Charles Mingus, Miles Davis, Elmo Hope and originals by Lacy and Waldron.

== Reception ==
The AllMusic review by Ken Dryden stated: "Like all collaborations featuring Steve Lacy and Mal Waldron together, this Soul Note CD is highly recommended."

Professional ratings
Review scores
Source	Rating
AllMusic	4/5 stars
The Penguin Guide to Jazz Recordings	4/4 stars

== Track listing ==
1. "Who Knows" (Monk) - 4:02
2. "Peggy's Blue Skylight" (Mingus) - 6:53
3. "Smooch" (Mingus, Davis) - 5:42
4. "Blue Monk" (Monk) - 6:07
5. "Roll On" (Hope) - 5:23
6. "No More Tears" (Waldron) - 5:46
7. "Esteem" (Lacy) - 6:09
8. "Prayer" (Lacy) - 6:27
9. "Fondest Recollections" (Waldron) - 8:34
10. "Wickets" (Lacy) - 4:55
11. "Communique" (Waldron, Lacy) - 3:56
- Recorded at Mu Rec Studio, Milano, on March 8 and 9, 1994

== Personnel ==
- Steve Lacy – soprano saxophone
- Mal Waldron – piano
- Giovanni Bonandrini – producer
- Maria Bonandrini – artwork
- William S. Burroughs – paintings
- Gennaro Carone – mastering
- Paolo Falascone – engineer, mixing
- Steve Holtje – liner notes
