= Irene Aebi =

Swiss singer, violinist and cellist (born 1939)

- Born: 27 July 1939; Zurich, Switzerland
- Died: 11 August 2026 (aged 87); Ghent, Belgium
- Occupations: singer, violinist and cellist

Irene Aebi (27 July 1939 – 11 August 2026) was a Swiss singer, violinist and cellist. She is noted for her work with jazz saxophonist Steve Lacy, her husband, from the 1960s to his death in 2004.

Initially a classically trained instrumentalist, she only began to sing at Lacy's request. In a review of a 1999 concert, critic Frank Rubolino describes Aebi as possessing a "brusque, forceful style of singing".

== Discography ==
With Steve Lacy

- Moon (BYG, 1971)
- Wordless (Futura, 1971)
- The Gap (America, 1972)
- Estilhacos (Guilda Da Musica, 1972)
- Roba (Saravah, 1972)
- Scraps (Saravah, 1974)
- Dreams (Saravah, 1975)
- Flakes (RCA, 1975)
- Songs (Musica, 1977)
- Follies (FMP, 1978)
- Troubles (Black Saint, 1979)
- Stamps (Hat Hut, 1979)
- Crops & the Woe (Quark & Books, 1979)
- The Owl (Saravah, 1979)
- The Way (Hat Hut, 1980)
- Songs with Brion Gysin (Hat ART, 1981)
- Ballets (Hat ART, 1982)
- Prospectus (Hat ART, 1983)
- Blinks (Hat Hut, 1984)
- The Condor (Soul Note, 1986)
- The Gleam (Silkheart, 1987)
- Momentum (Novus, 1987)
- The Door (Novus, 1989)
- Itinerary (Hat ART, 1991)
- Live at Sweet Basil (Novus/RCA, 1992)
- Clangs (Hat ART, 1993)
- Vespers (Soul Note, 1993)
- Weal & Woe (Emanem, 1995)
- The Cry (Soul Note, 1999)
- Monk's Dream (Verve, 2000)
- Gravensteen Ghent 1971 (Naked Music, 2004)
- Esteem: Live in Paris 1975 (Atavistic, 2006)

With others

- Takashi Kako, Micro Worlds (Trio, 1976)
- Alan Silva, Seasons (BYG, 1971)
- Mal Waldron, Mal Waldron with the Steve Lacy Quintet (America, 1972)
