= Trickles =

Studio album by Steve Lacy
- Released: 1976
- Recorded: March 11 & 14, 1976
- Genre: Jazz
- Length: 39:13
- Label: Black Saint
- Producer: Giacomo Pellicciotti

Steve Lacy chronology
Stabs (1976)	Trickles (1976)	The Wire (1977)

Trickles is the first album by Steve Lacy to be released on the Italian Black Saint label. It features performances of five of Lacy's compositions by Lacy, Roswell Rudd, Kent Carter and Beaver Harris.

== Reception ==
The AllMusic review by Scott Yanow stated, "One of the early Black Saint albums, this set features a reunion between soprano saxophonist Steve Lacy and trombonist Roswell Rudd; bassist Ken Carter and drummer Beaver Harris complete the quartet. Although Lacy and Rudd had had a group 15 years earlier that exclusively played Thelonious Monk tunes, in this case they perform five of Lacy's diverse originals, stretching themselves on such tunes as 'Trickles' and 'Robes'. The music is less melodic than expected but does have its moments of interest."

Professional ratings
Review scores
Source	Rating
AllMusic	4.5/5 stars
The Penguin Guide to Jazz Recordings	3/4 stars
The Rolling Stone Jazz Record Guide	3/5 stars

== Track listing ==
All compositions by Steve Lacy

1. "Trickles" - 10:06
2. "I Feel A Draught" - 4:11
3. "The Bite" - 6:40
4. "Papa's Midnite Hop" - 7:58
5. "Robes" - 10:18

- Recorded at Generation Sound Studios, New York, on March 11 and 14, 1976

== Personnel ==
- Steve Lacy - soprano saxophone
- Roswell Rudd - trombone, chimes on 5
- Kent Carter - bass
- Beaver Harris - drums
