= The Window (Steve Lacy album) =

Studio album by Steve Lacy
- Released: 1988
- Recorded: July 30–31, 1987
- Genre: Jazz
- Length: 48:31
- Label: Soul Note
- Producer: Giovanni Bonandrini

Steve Lacy chronology
The Super Quartet Live at Sweet Basil (1987)	The Window (1988)	Live in Budapest (1988)

The Window is an album by Steve Lacy which was released on the Italian Soul Note label in 1988 and features six of Lacy's compositions, one featuring text by the poet Mary Frazee, performed by Lacy, Jean-Jacques Avenel and Oliver Johnson.

== Reception ==
The Allmusic review awarded the album 4½ stars.

Professional ratings
Review scores
Source	Rating
Allmusic	4.5/5 stars

== Track listing ==
1 The Window - 8:02

2 Flakes - 7:00

3 Twilight - 9:14

4 The Gleam - 8:23

5 A Complicated Scene - (Mary Frazee, Steve Lacy) - 8:48

6 Retreat - 7:04

All compositions by Steve Lacy except as indicated
- Recorded July 30–31, 1987 at Barigozzi Studios, Milan

== Personnel ==
- Steve Lacy - soprano saxophone
- Jean-Jacques Avenel - bass
- Oliver Johnson - drums
