= Clangs (album) =

Live album by Steve Lacy Double Sextet
- Released: 1993
- Recorded: March 4–6, 1992
- Venue: Grosser Sendesaal Funkhaus Wallrafplatz, Cologne, Germany
- Genre: Jazz
- Length: 58:38
- Label: hat ART hat ART CD 6116
- Producer: Pia Uehlinger, Ulrich Kurth, Werner X. Uehlinger

Steve Lacy chronology
| Spirit of Mingus (1992) | Clangs (1993) | We See (1993) |

Clangs is a live album by soprano saxophonist Steve Lacy featuring a double sextet, which was recorded in Germany in 1992 and released on the Swiss hat ART label in 1993.

== Reception ==
Professional ratings
Review scores
| Source | Rating |
|---|---|
| Allmusic | 2.5/5 stars |

The Allmusic review by Thom Jurek called it "a mixed bag" observing "the set is long on poetics and short on swinging or blowing aesthetics ... this is an experiment that, with the exception of one track, didn't work".

== Track listing ==
All compositions by Steve Lacy

1. "The Owl" – 6:53
2. "Torments" – 10:52
3. "Tracks" – 7:30
4. "Dome" – 16:29
5. "The New Moon" – 11:15

== Personnel ==
- Steve Lacy – soprano saxophone
- Steve Potts – alto saxophone, soprano saxophone
- Hans Kennel – trumpet
- Glenn Ferris – trombone
- Irene Aebi – voice
- Nicholas Isherwood – voice
- Bobby Few – piano
- Eric Watson – piano
- Sonhando Estwick – vibraphone
- Jean-Jacques Avenel – bass
- John Betsch – drums
- Sam Kelly – percussion
