= Steve Lacy (saxophonist) =

American jazz saxophonist and composer (1934–2004)

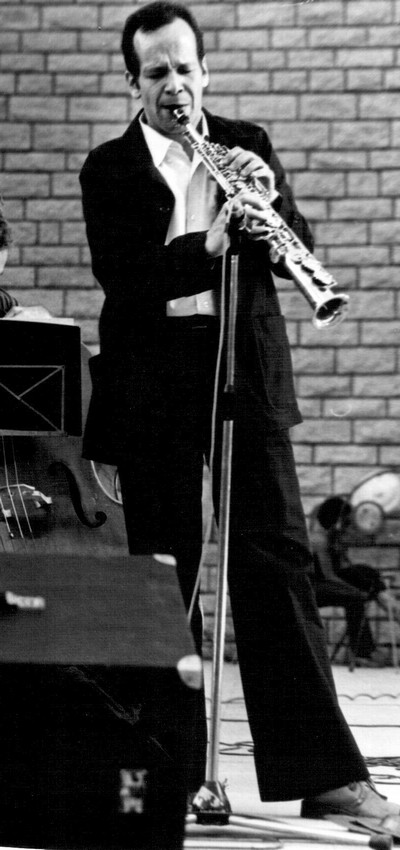
- Lacy in 1976

Background information
- Born: Steven Norman Lackritz; July 23, 1934; New York City, U.S.
- Died: June 4, 2004 (aged 69)
- Genres: Jazz, Dixieland, avant-garde jazz
- Occupation: Musician
- Instrument: Soprano saxophone
- Formerly of: Red Allen, Pee Wee Russell, Pops Foster, Thelonious Monk, Mal Waldron, Roswell Rudd, Cecil Taylor, Michail Bezverkhni

Steve Lacy (born Steven Norman Lackritz; July 23, 1934 – June 4, 2004) was an American jazz saxophonist and composer recognized as one of the important players of soprano saxophone. Coming to prominence in the 1950s as a progressive dixieland musician, Lacy went on to a long and prolific career. He worked extensively in experimental jazz and to a lesser extent in free improvisation, but Lacy's music was typically melodic and tightly-structured. Lacy also became a highly distinctive composer, with compositions often built out of little more than a single questioning phrase, repeated several times.

The music of Thelonious Monk became a permanent part of Lacy's repertoire after a stint in the pianist's band, with Monk's works appearing on virtually every Lacy album and concert program; Lacy often partnered with trombonist Roswell Rudd in exploring Monk's work. Beyond Monk, Lacy performed the work of jazz composers such as Charles Mingus, Duke Ellington and Herbie Nichols; unlike many jazz musicians he rarely played standard popular or show tunes.

== Early life and career ==
Lacy began his career at sixteen playing Dixieland music with much older musicians such as Henry "Red" Allen, Pee Wee Russell, George "Pops" Foster and Zutty Singleton and then with Kansas City jazz players like Buck Clayton, Dicky Wells, and Jimmy Rushing. He then became involved with the avant-garde, performing on Jazz Advance (1956), the debut album of Cecil Taylor, and appearing with Taylor's groundbreaking quartet at the 1957 Newport Jazz Festival; he also made a notable appearance on an early Gil Evans album. His most enduring relationship, however, was with the music of Thelonious Monk: he recorded the first album to feature only Monk compositions (Reflections, Prestige, 1958) and briefly played in Monk's band in 1960 and later on Monk's Big Band and Quartet in Concert album (Columbia, 1963).

== Europe and sextet ==
Lacy's first visit to Europe came in 1965, with a visit to Copenhagen in the company of Kenny Drew; he went to Italy and formed a quartet with Italian trumpeter Enrico Rava and the South African musicians Johnny Dyani and Louis Moholo (their visit to Buenos Aires is documented on The Forest and the Zoo, ESP, 1967). After a brief return to New York, he returned to Italy, then in 1970 moved to Paris, where he lived until the last two years of his life. He became a widely respected figure on the European jazz scene, though he remained less well known in the United States.

The core of Lacy's activities from the 1970s to the 1990s was his sextet: his wife, singer/violinist Irene Aebi, soprano/alto saxophonist Steve Potts, pianist Bobby Few, bassist Jean-Jacques Avenel, and drummer Oliver Johnson (later John Betsch). Sometimes this group was scaled up to a large ensemble (e.g. Vespers, Soul Note, 1993, which added Ricky Ford on tenor sax and Tom Varner on French horn), sometimes pared down to a quartet, trio, or even a two-saxophone duo. He played duos with pianist Eric Watson. Lacy also, beginning in the 1970s, became a specialist in solo saxophone; he ranks with Sonny Rollins, Anthony Braxton, Evan Parker, and Lol Coxhill in the development of this demanding form of improvisation.

Lacy was interested in all the arts: the visual arts and poetry in particular became important sources for him. Collaborating with painters and dancers in multimedia projects, he made musical settings of his favourite writers: Robert Creeley, Samuel Beckett, Tom Raworth, Taslima Nasrin, Herman Melville, Brion Gysin and other Beat writers, including settings for the Tao Te Ching and haiku poetry. As Creeley noted in the Poetry Project Newsletter, "There's no way simply to make clear how particular Steve Lacy was to poets or how much he can now teach them by fact of his own practice and example. No one was ever more generous or perceptive."

== Later career ==
In 1992, he was the recipient of a MacArthur Fellowship.

He also collaborated with a wide range of musicians, from traditional jazz to the avant-garde to contemporary classical music. Outside of his regular sextet, his most regular collaborator was pianist Mal Waldron, with whom he recorded a number of duet albums (notably Sempre Amore, a collection of Ellington/Strayhorn material, Soul Note, 1987).

Lacy played his 'farewell concerts to Europe' in Belgium, in duo and solo, for a small but motivated public. This happened in Brussels, Antwerp, Ghent, Bruges and Mons. In duo he played with Fred Van Hove, Joëlle Léandre, Mikhail Bezverkhni, Irène Aebi, Frederic Rzewski, Christopher Culpo and the dancer Shiro Daimon. This recollection is published by Naked Music, Afkikker, Ghent. In Ghent he played with the classical violinist Mikhail Bezverkhni, winner of Queen Elisabeth Concours. Two of these concerts were organized by Rita De Vuyst, his last muse in Europe, to whom he dedicated his solo CD Mother Goose solo @ afkikker. This CD is published within the book, Bone, a tribute to Lacy. He returned to the United States in 2002, where he began teaching at the New England Conservatory of Music in Boston, Massachusetts. One of his last public performances was in front of 25,000 people at the close of a peace rally on Boston Common in March 2003, shortly before the US-led invasion of Iraq.

After Lacy was diagnosed with liver cancer in August 2003, he continued playing and teaching until weeks before his death on June 4, 2004, at the age of 69.

== Discography ==
=== As leader/co-leader ===
Recording date	Title	Label	Year released	Notes
1957-11	Soprano Sax	Prestige	1957	
1958-10	Reflections	Prestige	1959	
1960-11	The Straight Horn of Steve Lacy	Candid	1961	
1961-11	Evidence	New Jazz	1962	
1963-03	School Days with Roswell Rudd	Emanem	1975	Live
1965-12	Disposability	Vik	1966	
1966-01	Jazz Realities with Carla Bley and Michael Mantler	Fontana	1966	
1966-02	Sortie	GTA	1966	
1966-10	The Forest and the Zoo	ESP-Disk	1967	Live
1969-06	Roba as Steve Lacy Gang	Saravah	1972	Live
1969-09	Moon	BYG Actuel	1969	
1969-09	Epistrophy	BYG Actuel	1969	
1971-01	Wordless	Futura	1971	Live
1971-09	Lapis	Saravah	1971	
1972-02	Estilhacos: Live in Lisbon	Guilda Da Música	1972	Live
1972-05	The Gap	America	1972	
1972-08	Solo - Théâtre Du Chêne Noir	Emanem	1974	Live
1972-08, 1973-01	Weal & Woe	Emanem	1974	Partially live (1972-08)
1973-04	Flaps with Franz Koglmann	Pipe	1973	
1973-07	The Crust	Emanem	1975	Live
1974-02	Scraps	Saravah	1974	
1974-05	Flakes	RCA	1974	
1974-09	Lumps with Michel Waisvisz, Han Bennink, Maarten van Regteren Altena	Instant Composers Pool	1978	
1974-12	Saxophone Special	Emanem	1974	Live
1975-05	Dreams	Saravah	1975	
1975-06	Stalks	Nippon Columbia	1975	
1975-06	Solo at Mandara	ALM	1975	
1975-06	Torments: Solo in Kyoto	Morgue	1979	
1975-06	The Wire	Denon Jazz	1977	
1975-06	Distant Voices with Masayuki Takayanagi and Takehisa Kosugi	Nippon Columbia	1976	
1975-09	Axieme	Red	1975	
1975-04, 1975-11	Stabs	FMP	1975	
1976-02	Clangs with Andrea Centazzo	Ictus	1976	Live
1976-03	Trickles	Black Saint	1976	
1973-01, 1976-03	Crops & The Woe	Quark Records & Books	1979	Partially live (1976-03)
1976-03	Hooky	Emanem	2000	
1976-05	Snips: Live at Environ	Jazz Magnet	2000	[2CD] Live
1976-09	Sidelines	Improvising Artists	1977	
1976-11	Straws	strange days	1977	
1976-12	Trio Live	Ictus	1977	Live
1977-01	Raps	Adelphi	1977	
1977-04	Follies	FMP	1978	Live
1977-05	Threads	Horo	1977	
1977-06	Clinkers	HatHut	1978	Live
1977-09	Catch	Horo	1977	
1977-10	Shots	Musica	1977	
1977	The Owl	Saravah	1979	
1977-08, 1978-02	Stamps	HatHut	1979	Live
1978-02	Points	Le Chant Du Monde	1978	
1979-01	The Way	hat Hut	1980	
1979-02	Eronel	Horo	1979	
1979-05	Troubles	Black Saint	1979	
1979-10	Duet with Walter Zuber Armstrong also released as Alter Ego	World Artists	1979	
1979-10	Call Notes with Walter Zuber Armstrong	World Artists	1980	
1979-12	Capers also released as N.Y. Capers & Quirks	hat Hut	1981	Live
1979-12	Tips	hat Hut	1981	
1981-01	Songs with Brion Gysin	hat ART	1981	
1980-12, 1981-04	Ballets	hat ART	1982	
1982-01	The Flame	Black Saint	1982	
1982-06	Regeneration with Roswell Rudd, Misha Mengelberg et al.	Soul Note	1983	
1982-11	Prospectus	hat ART	1983	Live
1983-02	Blinks	hat ART	1984	Live
1984-07	Change of Season with Misha Mengelberg, Han Bennink et al.	Soul Note	1985	
1984-09	Live Lugano 1984 with Barry Wedgle, J.J. Avenel	ezz-thetics	2025	Live
1984-11, 1985-01	Futurities	Hat Hut	1985	[2LP]
1985-03	Deadline with Ulrich Gumpert	Sound Aspects	1987	Live
1985-06	The Condor	Soul Note	1986	
1985-07	Chirps with Evan Parker	FMP	1986	Live
1985-07	Only Monk	Soul Note	1987	
1985-12	Steve Lacy Solo	In Situ	1991	
1986-02	Morning Joy	hat ART	1989	Live
1986-05	Solo	Egg Farm	1986	
1986-05	The Kiss	Lunatic	1987	Live
1986-06	One Fell Swoop	Silkheart	1987	
1986-04, 1986-06	Outings	Ismez	1986	
1986?	Hocus-Pocus	Les Disques Du Crépuscule	1986	
1986-07	The Gleam	Silkheart	1987	
1986-12	Flim-Flam with Steve Potts	hat ART	1991	
1987-03	Dutch Masters with Misha Mengelberg, Han Bennink, George E. Lewis, Ernst Reijseger	Soul Note	1992	
1987-04	Explorations with Subroto Roy Chowdury	Jazzpoint	1987	
1987-05	Momentum	RCA Novus	1987	
1987-07	The Window	RCA Novus	1988	
1987-10	Live in Budapest with Steve Potts	West Wind	1988	Live
1987-10	Image with Steve Argüelles	Ah Um	1989	
1987-11	The Amiens Concert with Eric Watson and John Lindberg	Amiens	1987	Live
1987-11, 1987-12	Paris Blues with Gil Evans	Owl	1987	
1988-07	The Door	RCA Novus	1989	
1989-04	More Monk	Soul Note	1991	
1989-09, 1989-11	Rushes: Ten Songs from Russia	New Sound Planet	1990	
1990-06	Anthem	RCA Novus	1990	
1990-11	Itinerary	hat ART	1991	Live
1991-04	Remains	hat ART	1992	
1991-07	Live at Sweet Basil	RCA Novus	1992	Live
1991-12	Spirit of Mingus	Freelance	1992	Live
1992-03	Clangs	hat ART	1993	Live
1993-09	We See	hat ART	1993	Live
1992-09	Three Blokes with Evan Parker and Lol Coxhill	FMP	1994	Live
1993-02	Revenue	Soul Note	1993	
1993-07	Vespers	Soul Note	1993	
1994-01	The Rendezvous with Barry Wedgle	Exit	1995	
1994-03	5 x Monk 5 x Lacy	Silkheart	1997	Live
1995-03	Packet with Irene Aebi, Frederic Rzewski	Naxos	1995	
1995-04	Actuality	Cavity Search	1995	
1995-06	The Joan Miró Foundation Concert with Irene Aebi	Nova Era	1999	Live
1995-09	Eternal Duo '95 with Masahiko Togashi	Take One	1996	Live
1995-09	Blues for Aida	Egg Farm	1996	[2CD] Live
1996-03	Bye-Ya	Freelance	1996	
1996-04	Five Facings	FMP	1996	Live
1997-11	Live at Unity Temple	Wobbly Rail	1998	Live
1997-11	The Rent	Cavity Search	1999	[2CD] Live
1998-03	The Cry	Soul Note	1999	
1998-07	Sands	Tzadik	1998	
1999-06	Monk's Dream	Verve	2000	
2000-10	10 of Dukes & 6 Originals	Senators	2002	Live
2000-10	Apices with Masahiko Togashi and Masahiko Satoh	Studio Songs	2002	Live
2001-08	Best Wishes: Live at The Labirinti Sonori Festival 2001	Labirinti Sonori	2001	Live
2001-09	Dummy - Steve Lacy Meets the Riccardo Fassi Trio	Splasc(H) Records	2002	
2001-09	Materioso (Monk's Moods)	Onyx JazzClub	2003	Live
1998-01, 2001-10	The Holy La	Free Lance	2002	
2001-10	Mother Goose, solo@afkikker in Bone: a tribute to Steve Lacy	Gent	2003	[CD attached in book] Live
2001-12	The Beat Suite	Universal Music Jazz France	2003	
2002-05	Work with Anthony Cox、Daniel Humair	Sawano	2003	
2002-07	One More Time with Joëlle Léandre	Leo	2005	Live
2002-07, 2002-08	Leaves Blossoms	Naked Music	2005	Live
2002-12	New Jazz Meeting Baden-Baden 2002	hatOLOGY	2003	[2CD] Live
2003-11	November	Intakt	2010	Live
2004-03	Last Tour	Emanem	2015	Live

Compilations

- Scratching the Seventies/Dreams (Saravah, 1996)
- Associates (Musica Jazz, 1996)
- Opium with Bill Dixon, Franz Koglmann (Between The Lines, 2001) – rec. 1973-76; compiles tracks from the Koglmann/Lacy album Flaps (Pipe, 1973) and the Koglmann/Dixon album Opium for Franz (Pipe, 1977)
- The Complete Whitey Mitchell Sessions (Lone Hill Jazz, 2004) – rec. 1956
- Tao with Andrea Centazzo (Ictus, 2006) – rec. 1976-84
- Early and Late with Roswell Rudd (Cuneiform, 2007) – rec. 1962, 1999, 2002
- The Sun (Emanem, 2012)
- Avignon And After Volume 1 (Emanem, 2012)
- Avignon And After Volume 2 (Emanem, 2014)

=== With Mal Waldron ===
- Journey Without End (RCA Victor, 1971)
- Mal Waldron with the Steve Lacy Quintet (America, 1972)
- Hard Talk (Enja, 1974)
- One-Upmanship (Enja, 1977)
- Moods (Enja, 1978)
- Sempre Amore (Soul Note, 1987) – rec. 1986
- The Super Quartet Live at Sweet Basil (Paddle Wheel, 1987)
- Hot House (RCA Novus, 1991) – rec. 1990
- I Remember Thelonious (Nel Jazz, 1996) – rec. 1992
- Let's Call This... Esteem (Slam, 1993) – live
- Communiqué (Soul Note, 1997)
- One More Time (2002)
- Live at Dreher, Paris 1981 (hatOLOGY, 2003) – compilation
  - Live at Dreher, Paris 1981, Round Midnight Vol. 1 (hat ART, 1996)
  - Live at Dreher, Paris 1981, The Peak Vol. 2 (hat ART, 1996)
- Japan Dream (2004)
- At the Bimhuis 1982 (2006)
- The Mighty Warriors Live in Antwerp (Elemental, 2024) – rec. 1995

=== As sideman ===
With Area

- Maledetti (Cramps, 1976)
- Event '76 (Cramps, 1979) – rec. 1976

With Miles Davis

- Miles Davis at Carnegie Hall (Columbia, 1962) – rec. 1961
- Quiet Nights (Columbia, 1963) – rec. 1962–63

With Gil Evans

- Gil Evans & Ten ( Prestige, 1958) – rec. 1957
- Great Jazz Standards (World Pacific, 1959)
- The Individualism of Gil Evans (Verve, 1964) – rec. 1963–64
- Parabola (Horo, 1979) – rec. 1978

With Giorgio Gaslini

- Nuovi Sentimenti (La Voce Del Padrone, 1966)
- Il Grido: Big Band Live (Durium, 1968)
- Fabbrica Occupata (Produttori Associati, 1974) – rec. 1973. also with Jean-Luc Ponty

With Globe Unity Orchestra

- Evidence, vol.1 (FMP, 1976) – rec. 1975
- Into the Valley, vol.2 (FMP, 1976) – rec. 1975

With Roswell Rudd

- Blown Bone (Philips, 1979) – rec. 1976
- Broad Strokes (Knitting Factory, 2000)

With Dick Sutton

- Jazz Idiom (Jaguar, 1954)[10"]
- Progressive Dixieland (Jaguar, 1954)[10"]

With Cecil Taylor

- Jazz Advance (Transition, 1957) – rec. 1956
- At Newport (Verve, 1958) – also with Gigi Gryce. rec 1957.

With Giovanni Tommaso

- Indefinitive Atmosphere (SR, 1970) – rec. 1968
- La Banda Del Cibo Salutare (RCA, 1970)

With others

- Tom Stewart, Quintet/Sextet (ABC-Paramount, 1956)
- Whitey Mitchell Sextette, Whitey Mitchell Sextette (Sparton, 1956)
- Thelonious Monk, Big Band and Quartet in Concert (Columbia, 1964) – rec. 1963
- Bobby Hackett, Hello Louis (Epic, 1964)
- Kenny Burrell, Guitar Forms (Verve, 1965) – rec. 1964
- Jazz Composers Orchestra, Communication (Fontana, 1965) – rec. 1964–65
- Gary Burton, A Genuine Tong Funeral (RCA, 1968) – rec. 1967
- Alan Silva, Seasons (BYG Actuel, 1971) – rec. 1970
- Maria Monti, Il Bestiario (Rifi, 1974)
- Max Roach & Abbey Lincoln, Sounds as a Roach (Joker, 1977) – rec. 1968
- Derek Bailey's Company, Company 4 (Incus, 1977) – rec. 1976
- Musica Elettronica Viva, United Patchwork (Horo, 1977)
- Kenny Davern, Unexpected (Kharma, 1978)
- Laboratorio della Quercia, Laboratorio della Quercia del Tasso (Horo, 1978)
- Globe Unity Orchestra, Compositions (Japo, 1980) – rec. 1979
- V.A., Amarcord Nino Rota (Corbett Vs. Dempsey, 1980)
- Tiziana Ghiglioni, Somebody Special (Soul Note, 1986)
- Company, Company, vol. 5, 6, 7 (Incus, 1991) – rec. 1977
- V.A., Interpretations Of Monk (DIW, 1994) – rec. 1981
- Joe Puma, Wild Kitten (Dawn, 1998) – 2 tracks in reissued version
- Hans Koller, London Ear (33 Records, 2005) featuring Steve Lacy - rec. 2003
