= Morning Joy =

Live album by Steve Lacy
- Released: 1989
- Recorded: February 19, 1986
- Venue: Sunset Club, Paris, France
- Genre: Jazz
- Length: 68:33
- Label: hat ART hat ART CD 6014
- Producer: Werner X. Uehlinger

Steve Lacy chronology
Sempre Amore (1986)	Morning Joy (1989)	The Kiss (1987)

Morning Joy, subtitled Live at Sunset Paris is a live album by saxophonist Steve Lacy, recorded in France in 1986 and first released on the hat ART label in 1989. The album was reissued in 2001 as Morning Joy and 2015 as Morning Joy...Paris Live with an additional track.

== Reception ==
Professional ratings
Review scores
Source	Rating
AllMusic	4.5/5 stars
The Penguin Guide to Jazz Recordings	4/4 stars

The AllMusic review by Steve Loewy called it a "glorious set of pieces performed live in the mid-'80s by one of Steve Lacy's sterling working groups" and stated, "Morning Joy may not break any new ground, but it should provide considerable listening pleasure, both for those already familiar with the miraculous world of Steve Lacy and for those who are entering it for the first time".

== Track listing ==
All compositions by Steve Lacy except where noted

1. "Epistrophy" (Thelonious Monk, Kenny Clarke) – 9:20
2. "Prospectus" – 7:44
3. "Wickets" – 16:11
4. "Morning Joy" – 10:25
5. "Work" (Monk) – 7:38 Additional track on CD reissue
6. "In Walked Bud" (Monk) – 11:41
7. "As Usual" – 13:11

== Personnel ==
- Steve Lacy – soprano saxophone
- Steve Potts – alto saxophone, soprano saxophone
- Jean-Jacques Avenel – bass
- Oliver Johnson - drums
