= Flim-Flam (album) =

Live album by Steve Lacy & Steve Potts
- Released: 1991
- Recorded: December 2, 1986
- Venue: Stadttheater Basel, Switzerland
- Genre: Jazz
- Length: 65:59
- Label: hat ART hat ART CD 6087
- Producer: Pia Uehlinger, Werner X. Uehlinger

Steve Lacy chronology
The Gleam (1986)	Flim-Flam (1991)	Momentum (1987)

Flim-Flam is a live album by saxophonists Steve Lacy and Steve Potts, which was recorded in Berne, Switzerland in 1986 and first released on the hat ART label in 1991.

== Reception ==
Professional ratings
Review scores
Source	Rating
Allmusic	3/5 stars

The Allmusic review by Thom Jurek called it "a swinging affair" stating "While there are edges and some outrageous improvisation, Steve Potts (right channel) and Steve Lacy (left channel) keep this firmly in the Monk-ian jazz vein. ... Given that these men played together for such a long time, that there is such instantaneous call and response should not be a surprise. However, there is also something to be said for restraint, and the pair practice that here as well. This is a blowing date to be sure, with lots of interesting and remarkable improvisation, but both men are interested primarily in using their instruments to carry 'song,' which they did to the delight of the Swiss audience who heard them, and anyone who encounters this recording".

== Track listing ==
All compositions by Steve Lacy

1. "The Crust" – 6:18
2. "Flim-Flam" – 11:04
3. "3 Points" – 21:04
4. "The Whammies!" – 8:03
5. "Rimace Poco" – 8:39
6. "The Gleam" – 10:51

== Personnel ==
- Steve Lacy – soprano saxophone
- Steve Potts – alto saxophone, soprano saxophone
