= Reflections (Steve Lacy album) =

Studio album by Steve Lacy
- Released: 1959
- Recorded: October 17, 1958
- Studio: Van Gelder, Hackensack, NJ
- Genre: Jazz
- Length: 36:43
- Label: Prestige

Steve Lacy chronology
Soprano Sax (1958)	Reflections (1959)	The Straight Horn of Steve Lacy (1961)

Reflections (subtitled Steve Lacy Plays Thelonious Monk) is the second album by Steve Lacy, released on the Prestige label in 1959. It features performances of Thelonious Monk's compositions by Lacy, Mal Waldron, Buell Neidlinger and Elvin Jones. (According to biographer Robin Kelley, this was the first album devoted entirely to Monk's music recorded by another artist.)

== Reception ==
The AllMusic review by Scott Yanow stated: "All of soprano saxophonist Steve Lacy's early recordings are quite fascinating, for during 1957-1964, aspects of his style at times hinted at Dixieland, swing, Monk, and Cecil Taylor, sometimes at the same time. For this CD reissue (a straight reproduction of the original New Jazz LP), Lacy teams up with pianist Mal Waldron, bassist Buell Neidlinger, and drummer Elvin Jones for seven Thelonious Monk compositions. The typical standbys (such as ''Round Midnight,' 'Straight No Chaser,' and 'Blue Monk') are avoided in favor of more complex works such as 'Four in One,' 'Bye-Ya,' and 'Skippy'; the sweet ballad 'Ask Me Now' is a highpoint. Lacy always had an affinity for Monk's music and, even nearly 40 years later, this set is a delight."

Professional ratings
Review scores
Source	Rating
AllMusic	4.5/5 stars
The Penguin Guide to Jazz Recordings	4/4 stars

== Track listing ==
1. "Four In One" - 6:01
2. "Reflections" - 4:09
3. "Hornin' In" - 5:11
4. "Bye-Ya" - 4:40
5. "Let's Call This" - 7:15
6. "Ask Me Now" - 4:58
7. "Skippy" - 4:16

All compositions by Thelonious Monk
- Recorded in Hackensack, NJ, October 17, 1958

== Personnel ==
- Steve Lacy - soprano saxophone
- Mal Waldron - piano
- Buell Neidlinger - bass
- Elvin Jones - drums
