= Thelonious Monk =

American jazz pianist and composer (1917–1982)

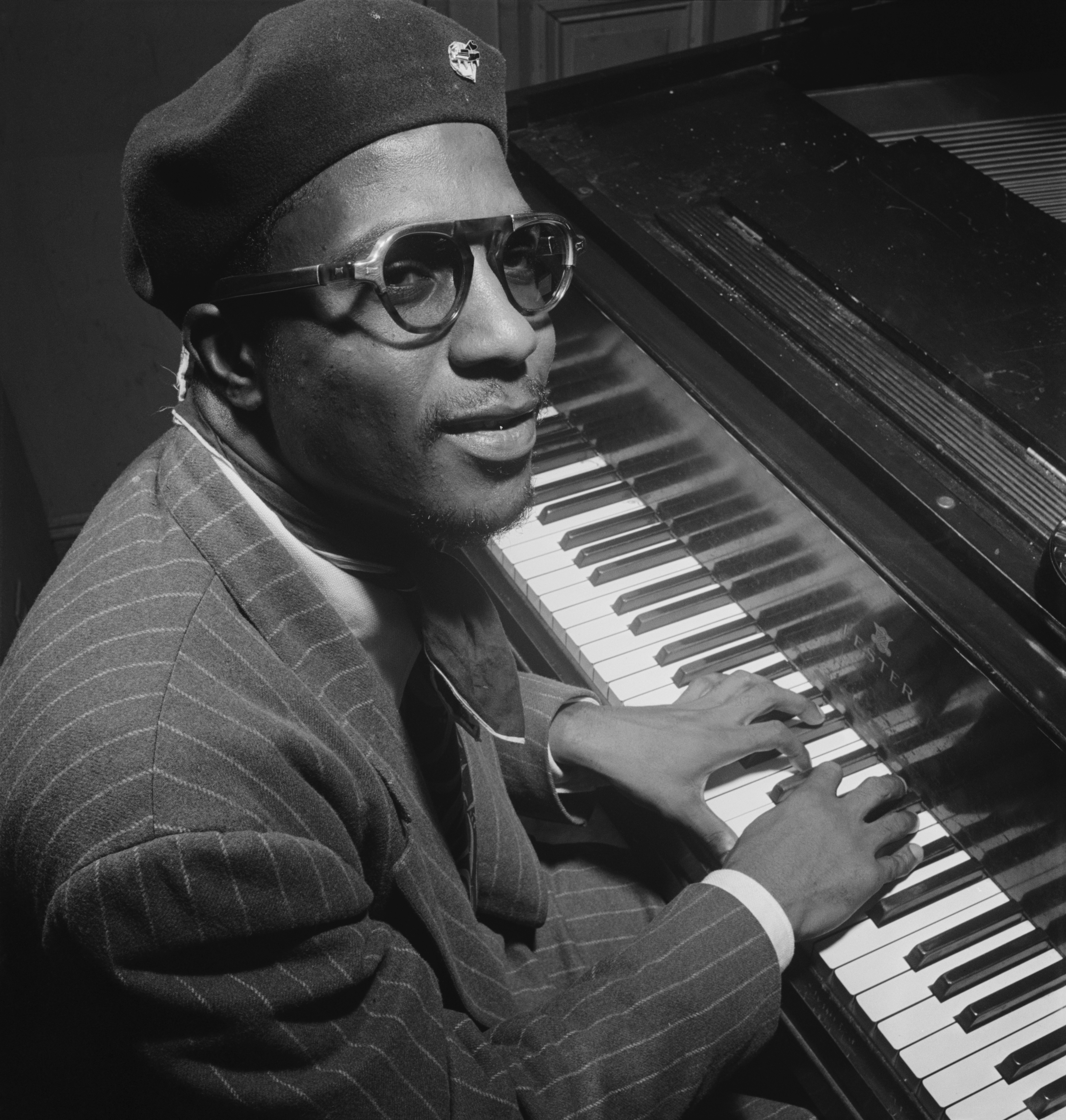
- Monk at Minton's Playhouse in New York City, 1947; by William P. Gottlieb
- Born: Thelonious Monk Jr. October 10, 1917; Rocky Mount, North Carolina, U.S.
- Died: February 17, 1982 (aged 64); Englewood, New Jersey, U.S.
- Burial place: Ferncliff Cemetery, Hartsdale, New York
- Occupations: Musician; composer
- Years active: 1933–1976
- Notable work: Discography; List of compositions
- Spouse: Nellie Smith (m. 1947)
- Children: 2, including T. S. Monk
- Musical career
- Genres: Jazz; bebop; hard bop
- Instrument: Piano
- Labels: Blue Note; Prestige; Riverside; Columbia
- Formerly of: Coleman Hawkins Quartet; The Giants of Jazz
- Website: www.theloniousmonkmusic.com

Thelonious Sphere Monk (/θəˈloʊniəs/; October 10, 1917 – February 17, 1982) was an American jazz pianist and composer. He had a unique improvisational style and made numerous contributions to the standard jazz repertoire, including "'Round Midnight", "Blue Monk", "Straight, No Chaser", "Ruby, My Dear", "In Walked Bud", and "Well, You Needn't". As of 2009, Monk was the second-most-recorded jazz composer in history, after Duke Ellington.

Monk's compositions and improvisations feature dissonances and angular melodies, often using flat ninths, flat fifths, unexpected chromatic notes, low bass notes and stride, and fast whole-tone runs. His playing style combined a highly percussive attack with abrupt, dramatic use of switched key releases, silences, and hesitations.

His distinctive look included suits, hats, and sunglasses. He also had an idiosyncratic habit during performances; while other musicians continued playing, Monk would stop, stand up, and dance for a few moments before returning to the piano.

Monk is one of five jazz musicians to have been featured on the cover of Time magazine, along with Louis Armstrong, Dave Brubeck, Duke Ellington, and Wynton Marsalis.

== Biography ==
=== 1917–1933: Early life ===
Thelonious Sphere Monk was born on October 10, 1917, in Rocky Mount, North Carolina, the son of Thelonious (or Thelious) and Barbara Monk. His sister, Marion, had been born two years earlier. His birth certificate spelled his first name as "Thelious" and did not list his middle name, taken from his maternal grandfather, Sphere Batts. His brother, Thomas, was born in January 1920. In 1922, the Monk family moved to the Phipps Houses at 243 West 63rd Street in San Juan Hill, Manhattan, New York City. (Subsequent redevelopment displaced the residents of the community, who saw their neighborhood replaced by the Amsterdam Housing Projects and Lincoln Center, though the Phipps Houses remained.) Monk briefly studied the trumpet before switching to piano at the age of nine. He took lessons from a neighbor, Alberta Simmons, who taught him the stride style of Fats Waller, James P. Johnson, and Eubie Blake. His mother also taught him to play some hymns, and he would often accompany her singing at church. He attended Stuyvesant High School, a prestigious public school for gifted students in Manhattan, but did not graduate.

For two years, Monk studied classical piano under Simon Wolf, an Austrian-born pianist and violinist who had studied under Alfred Megerlin, the concertmaster of the New York Philharmonic. Monk learned to play pieces by composers such as Bach, Mozart, Beethoven, and Liszt, but his favorites were Chopin and Rachmaninoff. The lessons ended when it became clear that Monk's primary passion was jazz.

=== 1933–1946: Early performing career ===
Monk put his first band together at the age of 16, getting a few restaurant and school gigs. At 17, Monk toured as an organist with an evangelist, and, in his late teens, he began to find work playing jazz. In the early to mid-1940s, he was the house pianist at Minton's Playhouse in Harlem. Much of Monk's style was developed while he performed at Minton's, where he participated in after-hours cutting contests, which featured many leading jazz soloists of the time. Monk's musical work at Minton's was crucial in the formulation of bebop, which would be furthered by musicians including Dizzy Gillespie, Charlie Christian, Kenny Clarke, Charlie Parker, and Miles Davis. Monk is believed to be the pianist featured on recordings Jerry Newman made around 1941 at the club. Monk's style at this time was later described as "hard-swinging", with the addition of runs in the style of Art Tatum. Monk's stated influences included Duke Ellington, James P. Johnson, and other early stride pianists. According to the documentary Thelonious Monk: Straight, No Chaser, Monk lived in the same neighborhood in New York City as Johnson and knew him as a teenager.

In March 1943, Monk reported for his Army induction physical but was labeled by the Army psychiatrist as a "psychiatric reject" and did not serve.

Mary Lou Williams, who mentored Monk and his contemporaries, spoke of him in this period: "So, the boppers worked out a music that was hard to steal. I'll say this for the 'leeches,' though: they tried. I've seen them in Minton's busily writing on their shirt cuffs or scribbling on the tablecloth. And even our own guys, I'm afraid, did not give Monk the credit he had coming. Why, they even stole his idea of the beret and bop glasses."

In 1944, Monk cut his first commercial recordings with the Coleman Hawkins Quartet. Hawkins was one of the earliest established jazz musicians to promote Monk, and the pianist later returned the favor by inviting Hawkins to join him on a 1957 session with John Coltrane.

=== 1947–1952: Lorraine Gordon ===
In 1947, Ike Quebec introduced Monk to Lorraine Gordon and her first husband, Alfred Lion, co-founder of Blue Note Records. Gordon preached Monk's genius to the jazz world with unrelenting passion. Shortly after meeting Gordon and Lion, Monk made his first recordings as a leader for Blue Note (later anthologized on Genius of Modern Music, Vol. 1). The Monk Blue Note Sessions were recorded between 1947 and 1952.

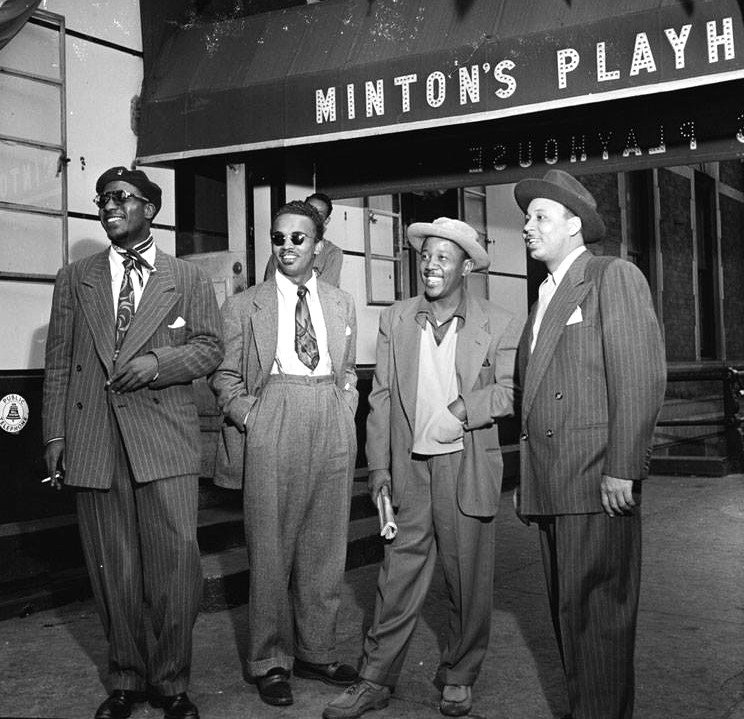
From left: Monk with trumpeters Howard McGhee and Roy Eldridge and bandleader Teddy Hill; Minton's Playhouse in New York City, 1947; by William P. Gottlieb

Monk married Nellie Smith in 1947, and on December 27, 1949, the couple had a son, T. S. Monk (called Toot), who became a jazz drummer. A daughter, Barbara (affectionately known as Boo-Boo), was born on September 5, 1953, and died of cancer in 1984.

In her autobiography, Gordon wrote of the lack of interest in Monk's early recordings. "I went to Harlem and those record stores didn't want Monk or me. I'll never forget one particular owner, I can still see him and his store on Seventh Avenue and 125th Street. 'He can't play, lady, what are you doing up here? The guy has two left hands.' 'You just wait,' I'd say. 'This man's a genius, you don't know anything.'"

For Lion, sales were a secondary consideration. The producer Michael Cuscuna relates that Lion once told him that there were three people in his life that when he heard them he felt had to record everything they did: Monk, Herbie Nichols, and Andrew Hill.

Due to Monk's reticence, Gordon became his mouthpiece to the public. In February 1948, she wrote to Ralph Ingersoll, the editor of the newspaper PM, and described Monk as "a genius living here in the heart of New York, whom nobody knows". As a result, one of PM's best writers visited Monk to write a feature on him, but Monk wouldn't speak to the reporter unless Gordon was in the room with him. In September of the same year, Gordon approached Max Gordon, the owner and founder of the Village Vanguard club in Greenwich Village (and her future husband), and secured Monk his first gig there. Monk was showcased at the club for a week, but not a single person came.

In August 1951, New York City police searched a parked car occupied by Monk and his friend Bud Powell. They found narcotics in the car, presumed to have belonged to Powell. Monk refused to testify against his friend, so the police confiscated his New York City Cabaret Card. Without this permit, Monk was nominally unable to play in any New York venue where liquor was served. Although this severely restricted his ability to perform for several years, a coterie of musicians led by Randy Weston introduced Monk to black-owned bars and clubs in Brooklyn that flouted the law, enabling him to play little-advertised, one-night engagements throughout the borough. Monk spent most of the 1950s composing and performing at theaters, outer borough clubs, and out-of-town venues.

=== 1952–1954: Prestige Records ===
After intermittent recording sessions for Blue Note from 1947 to 1952, Monk was under contract to Prestige Records for the following two years. With Prestige, he cut several highly significant, but at the time under-recognized, albums, including collaborations with the saxophonist Sonny Rollins and the drummers Art Blakey and Max Roach. In 1954, Monk participated in a Christmas Eve session which produced most of the albums Bags' Groove and Miles Davis and the Modern Jazz Giants by Davis. In his autobiography, Miles: The Autobiography, Davis claimed that the alleged anger and tension between them did not take place and that the claims of blows being exchanged were "rumors" and a "misunderstanding".

In 1954, Monk paid his first visit to Paris. As well as performing at concerts, he recorded a solo piano session for French radio (later issued as an album by Disques Vogue). Backstage, Mary Lou Williams introduced him to Baroness Pannonica de Koenigswarter, a member of the Rothschild family and a patroness of several New York City jazz musicians. She was a close friend for the rest of Monk's life: she "served as a surrogate wife right alongside Monk's equally devoted actual wife, Nellie", and "paid Monk's bills, dragged him to an endless array of doctors, put him and his family up in her own home and, when necessary, helped Nellie institutionalize him."

=== 1955–1961: Riverside Records ===
For years, they were telling me to play commercial, be commercial. I'm not commercial. I say, play your own way. You play what you want, and let the public pick up on what you were doing, even if it takes 15, 20 years.

— Thelonious Monk, early 1960s

By the time of his signing to Riverside Records, Monk was highly regarded by his peers and by some critics, but his records remained poor sellers and his music was still regarded as too "difficult" for mainstream acceptance. Indeed, with Monk's consent, Riverside had managed to buy out his previous Prestige contract for a mere $108.24 ($1,273.44 in 2024). He willingly recorded two albums of jazz standards as a means of increasing his profile: Thelonious Monk Plays Duke Ellington (1955) and The Unique Thelonious Monk (1956).

On Brilliant Corners, recorded in late 1956, Monk mainly performed his own music. The complex title track, which featured Rollins, was so difficult to play that the final version had to be edited together from multiple takes. The album was largely regarded as Monk's first commercial success.

After having his Cabaret Card restored, Monk relaunched his New York career with a landmark six-month residency at the Five Spot Café beginning in June 1957, leading a quartet with John Coltrane on tenor saxophone, Wilbur Ware on bass, and Shadow Wilson on drums. Little of this group's music was documented owing to contractual problems: Coltrane was signed to Prestige at the time, but Monk refused to return to his former label. One studio session by the quartet was made for Riverside, three tunes which were not released until 1961 by the subsidiary label Jazzland along with outtakes from a larger group recording with Coltrane and Hawkins, those results appearing in 1957 as the album Monk's Music. An amateur recording from the Five Spot (a later September 1958 reunion with Coltrane sitting in for Johnny Griffin) was issued on Blue Note in 1993, and a recording of the quartet performing at a Carnegie Hall concert on November 29 was recorded in high fidelity by Voice of America engineers, unearthed in the collection of the Library of Congress and released by Blue Note in 2005.

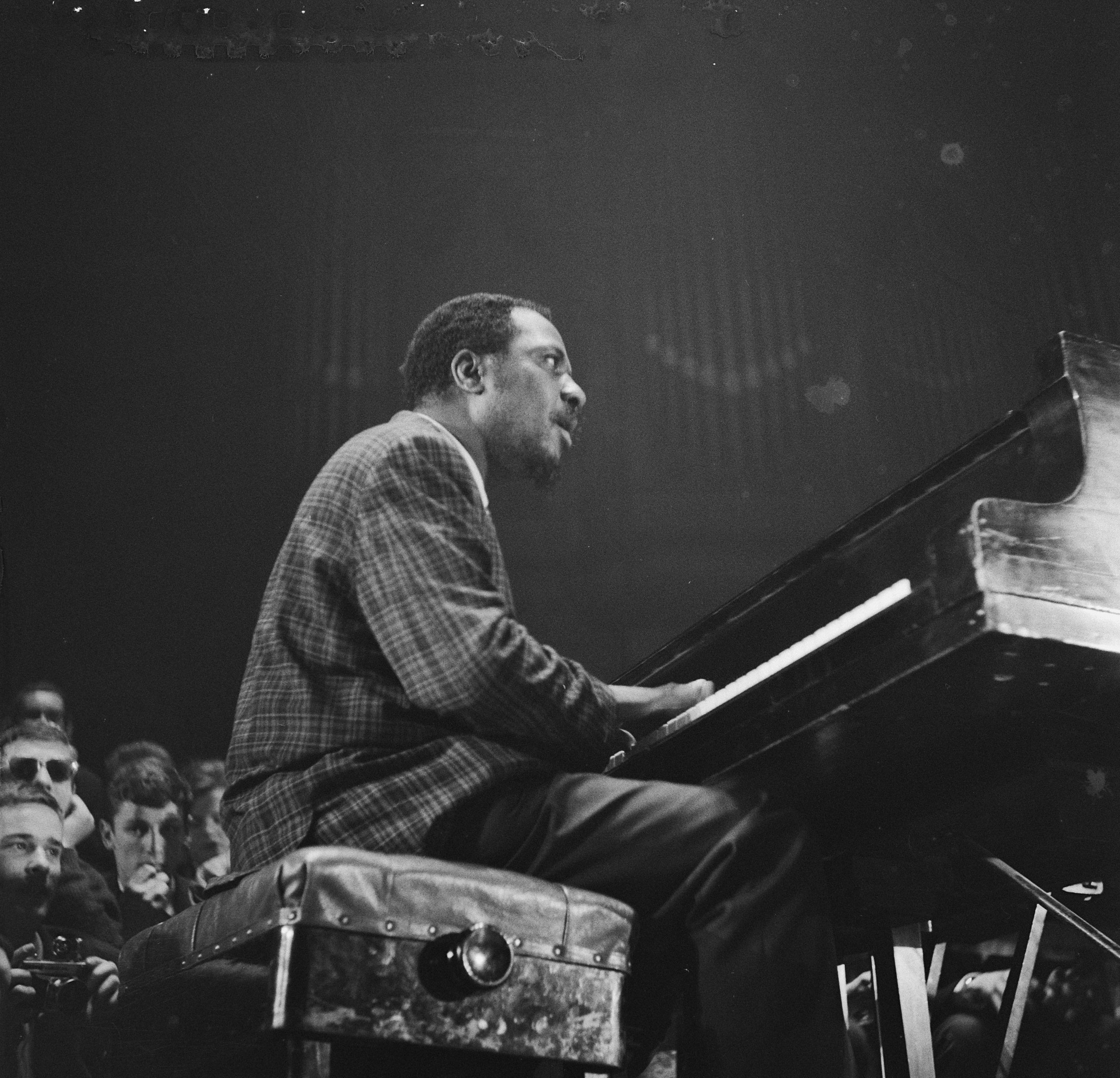
Monk performing at the Concertgebouw, Amsterdam, in 1961

"Crepuscule with Nellie", recorded in 1957, was referred to by biographer Robin D. G. Kelley as Monk's "only through-composed composition, meaning that there is no improvising. It is Monk's concerto, if you will, and in some ways it speaks for itself. But he wrote it very, very carefully and very deliberately and really struggled to make it sound the way it sounds. ... it was his love song for Nellie".

The Five Spot residency ended on Christmas 1957; Coltrane left to rejoin Miles Davis's group, and the band was effectively disbanded. Monk did not form another long-term band until June 1958, when he began a second residency at the Five Spot with Griffin (later replaced by Charlie Rouse) on tenor saxophone, Ahmed Abdul-Malik on bass, and Roy Haynes on drums.

On October 15, 1958, en route to a week-long engagement for the quartet at the Comedy Club in Baltimore, Monk and de Koenigswarter were detained by police in Wilmington, Delaware. When Monk refused to answer questions or cooperate with the policemen, they beat him with a blackjack. Although they had authorization to search the vehicle and found narcotics in suitcases held in the trunk of the car, Judge Christie of the Delaware Superior Court ruled that the unlawful detention of the pair and the beating of Monk rendered the consent to the search void as it was given under duress.

=== 1962–1970: Columbia Records ===
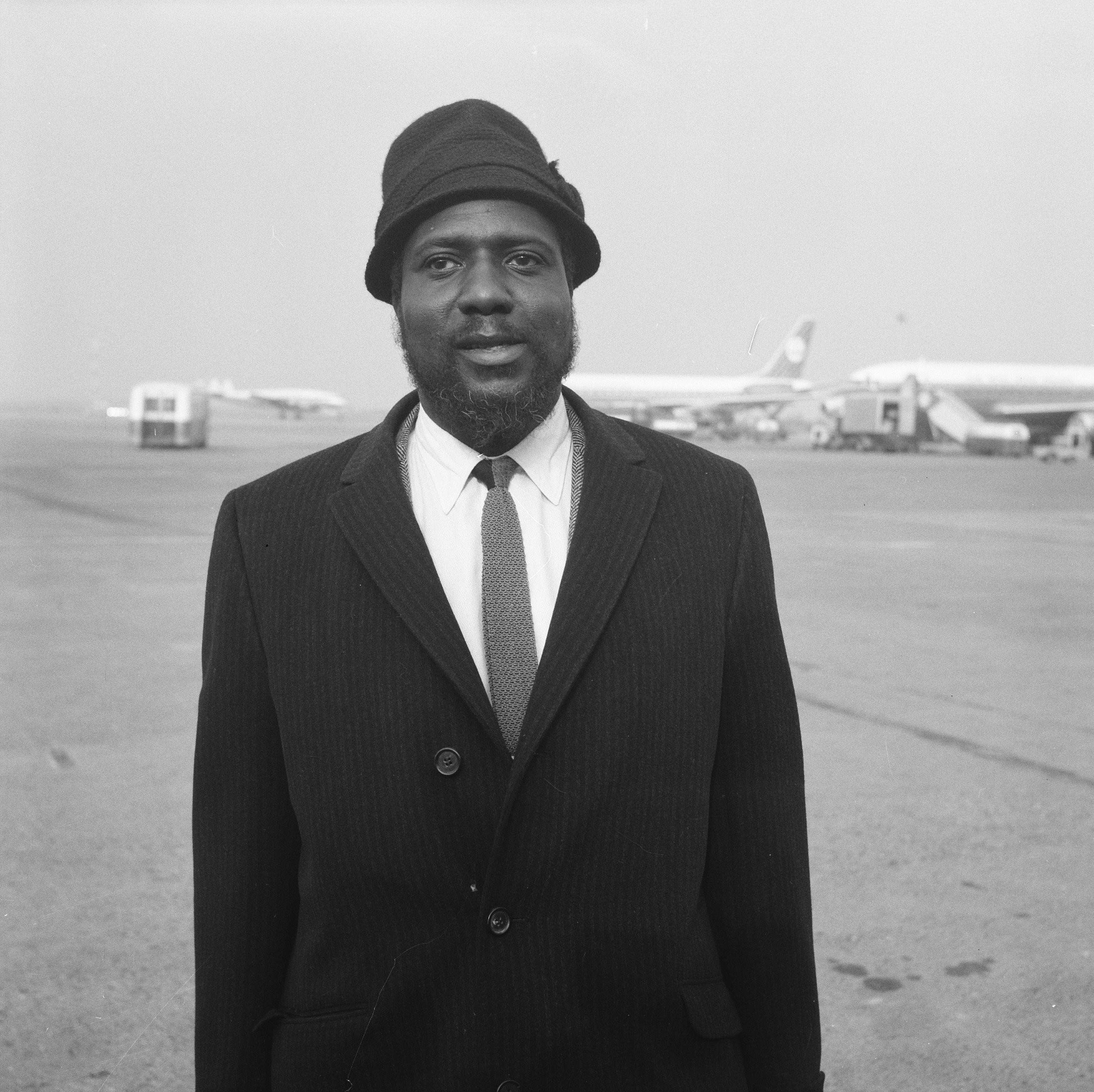
Monk in Amsterdam, 1964

After extended negotiations, in 1962 Monk signed with Columbia Records, one of the big four American record labels of the day. Monk's relationship with Riverside had soured over disagreements concerning royalty payments and had concluded with two European live albums; he had not recorded an album for Riverside since April 1960.

Working with the producer Teo Macero on his debut for Columbia, the sessions in the first week of November had a lineup that had been with him for two years: tenor saxophonist Rouse (who worked regularly with Monk from 1959 to 1970), bassist John Ore, and drummer Frankie Dunlop. Monk's Dream, his first Columbia album, was released in 1963.

Columbia's resources allowed Monk to receive more promotion than earlier in his career. Monk's Dream became the best-selling LP of his lifetime, and on February 28, 1964, he appeared on the cover of Time magazine, featured in the article "The Loneliest Monk". The cover article was originally intended to run in November 1963, but it was delayed due to the assassination of John F. Kennedy. According to biographer Kelley, the 1964 Time appearance came because "Barry Farrell, who wrote the cover story, wanted to write about a jazz musician and almost by default Monk was chosen, because they thought Ray Charles and Miles Davis were too controversial. ... [Monk] wasn't so political. ... Of course, I challenge that."

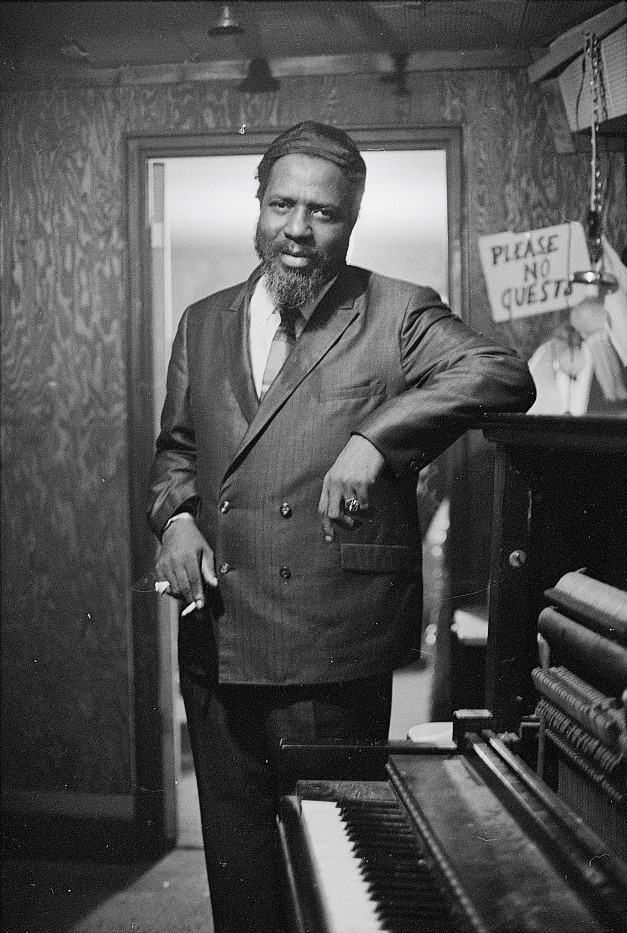
Monk at the Village Gate in New York City, 1968

Monk continued to record studio albums, including Criss Cross (1963) and Underground (1968). By this time, however, his compositional output was limited, and only Underground featured a substantial number of new compositions, including his only 3/4 time piece, "Ugly Beauty".

As had been the case with Riverside, his period with Columbia contains multiple live albums, including Miles & Monk at Newport (1963), Live at the It Club, and Live at the Jazz Workshop, the latter two recorded in 1964, the last not being released until 1982. After the departure of Ore and Dunlop, the remainder of the rhythm section in Monk's quartet during the bulk of his Columbia period was Larry Gales on bass and Ben Riley on drums, both of whom joined in 1964. Along with Rouse, they remained with Monk for over four years, his longest-serving band.

In 1968, Monk, Gales, Rouse, and Riley played a concert at Palo Alto High School in Palo Alto, California, at the invitation of a 16-year-old student charged with organizing school dances. This resulted in the quartet's final recording, Palo Alto (released in 2020).

=== 1971–1982: Later life and death ===
Monk had disappeared from the scene by the mid-1970s for health reasons and made only a small number of appearances during the final decade of his life. His last studio recordings as a leader were made in November 1971 for the English Black Lion label near the end of a worldwide tour with the Giants of Jazz, a group which also included Dizzy Gillespie, Kai Winding, Sonny Stitt, Al McKibbon, and Art Blakey. McKibbon, who had known Monk for over twenty years, recalled that "On that tour, Monk said about two words. I mean literally maybe two words. He didn't say 'Good morning,' 'Goodnight,' 'What time?' Nothing. Why, I don't know. He sent word back after the tour was over that the reason he couldn't communicate or play was that Art Blakey and I were so ugly." A different side of Monk is revealed in Lewis Porter's biography John Coltrane: His Life and Music; Coltrane states: "Monk is exactly the opposite of Miles [Davis]: he talks about music all the time, and he wants so much for you to understand that if, by chance, you ask him something, he'll spend hours if necessary to explain it to you." Blakey reported that Monk was excellent at both chess and checkers.

The documentary film Thelonious Monk: Straight, No Chaser (1988) attributed Monk's quirky behavior to mental illness. In the film, Monk's son said that his father sometimes did not recognize him, and he reported that Monk was hospitalized on several occasions owing to an unspecified mental illness that worsened in the late 1960s. No reports or diagnoses were ever publicized, but Monk would often become excited for two or three days, then pace for days after that, after which he would withdraw and stop speaking. Doctors recommended electroconvulsive therapy as a treatment option for Monk's illness, but his family would not allow it; antipsychotics and lithium were prescribed instead. Other theories abounded: Leslie Gourse, author of the book Straight, No Chaser: The Life and Genius of Thelonious Monk (1997), reported that at least one of Monk's psychiatrists failed to find evidence of manic depression (bipolar disorder) or schizophrenia. Another doctor maintains that Monk was misdiagnosed and prescribed drugs during his hospital stay that may have caused brain damage.

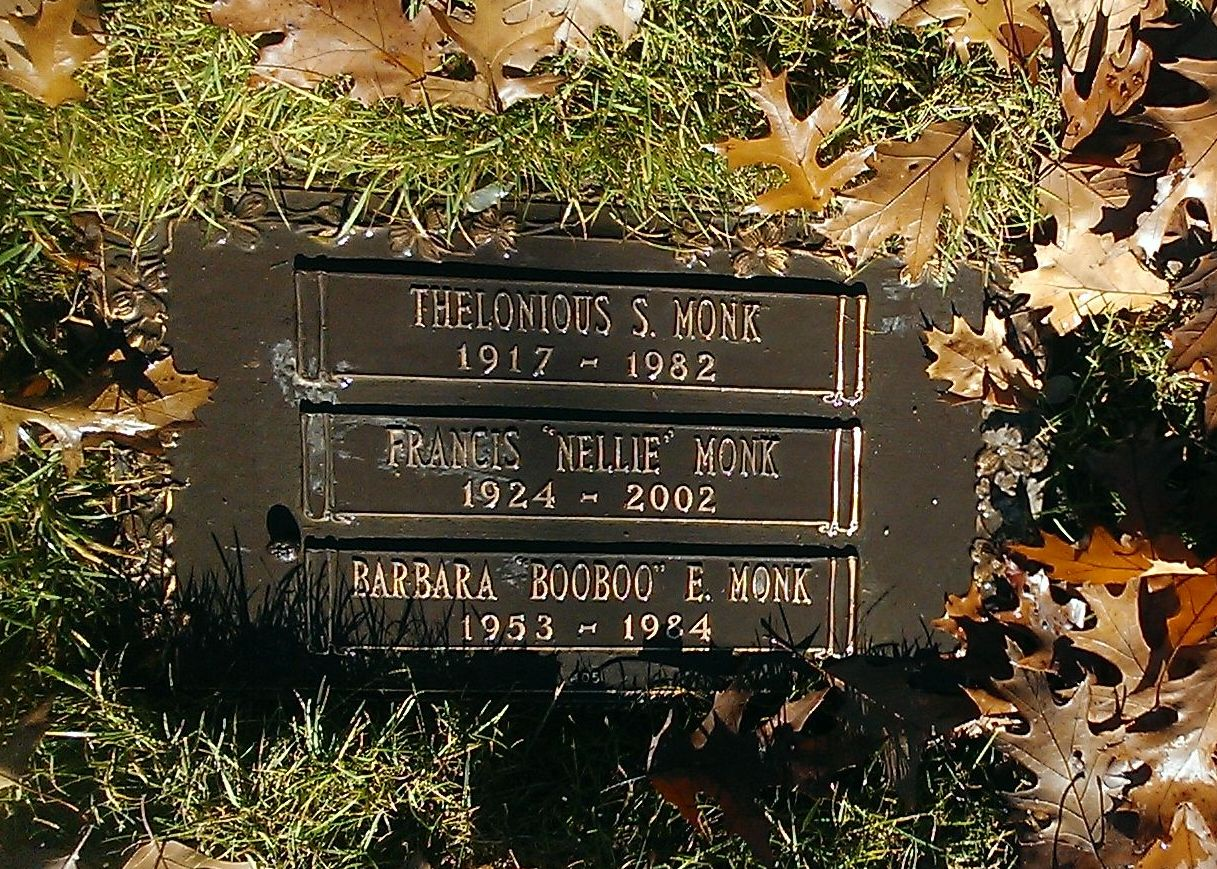
Monk's grave at Ferncliff Cemetery in Hartsdale, New York

As his health declined, Monk's last six years were spent as a guest in the Weehawken, New Jersey, home of de Koenigswarter, who nursed him during his final illness. She proved to be a steadfast presence, as did his own wife, Nellie, as his life descended into further isolation. Monk did not play the piano during this time, even though one was present in his room, and he spoke to few visitors. He died of a stroke on February 17, 1982, at Englewood Hospital in Englewood, New Jersey. His funeral was held at the Sanctuary of St. Peter's Church in Manhattan; he was buried in Ferncliff Cemetery (Grave 405, Hillcrest 1 section) in Hartsdale, New York.

=== Posthumous myth: Monk at Juilliard ===
There have been numerous published references since the 1980s in Monk biographies claiming that he attended the Juilliard School in New York City, an error that continues to be disseminated online. At Monk's funeral service in 1982, it was mentioned in his eulogy that he took classes in harmony and arrangement at Juilliard. In the 1988 documentary film Thelonious Monk: Straight No Chaser, Samuel E. Wright narrates that Monk "took lessons and studied music theory at the Juilliard School of Music."

The complete lack of documented evidence connecting Monk with attending Juilliard was noted by Monk biographer Thomas Fitterling in the first German edition of his Monk biography published in 1987. The myth may originate in the fact that Monk's sister, Marion, erroneously thought that her piano teacher, a Mr. Wolfe [sic], who briefly taught Thelonious around 1930, may have been connected to Juilliard as a teacher or student. Monk biographer Laurent de Wilde believed that the apocryphal Juilliard story may have stemmed from Monk's late 1950s collaboration with Juilliard instructor Hall Overton. The main source of the Juilliard misunderstanding is probably that Monk participated in a music contest c. 1942–43 at the Columbus Hill Community Center in his neighborhood, which had a Juilliard scholarship as the first prize. Monk entered the contest but placed second and thus failed to get the scholarship. According to Monk's wife, Nellie, when the prize winner later encountered Monk during a 1958 engagement and told him that he should rightfully have been awarded the Juilliard scholarship, Monk replied, "I'm glad I didn't go to the conservatory. Probably would've ruined me."

== Technique and playing style ==
Monk's music has profound humanity, disciplined economy, balanced virility, dramatic nobility, and innocently exuberant wit.

— Steve Lacy

Monk once said that "The piano ain't got no wrong notes."

According to Thomas Owens, the author of Bebop: The Music and Its Players:

Monk's usual piano touch was harsh and percussive, even in ballads. He often attacked the keyboard anew for each note, rather than striving for any semblance of legato. Often seemingly unintentional seconds embellish his melodic lines, giving the effect of someone playing while wearing work gloves. ... He hit the keys with fingers held flat rather than in a natural curve, and held his free fingers high above the keys. ... Sometimes he hit a single key with more than one finger, and divided single-line melodies between the two hands.

Despite this unorthodox approach, he could play runs and arpeggios with great speed and accuracy. He also had strong finger independence, allowing him to play a melodic line and a trill simultaneously in his right hand. According to the jazz pianist, educator, and broadcaster Billy Taylor, "Monk could really play like [Art] Tatum. He really had all the technique and he could really play like Art."

Monk's style was not universally appreciated. The poet and jazz critic Philip Larkin described him pejoratively as "the elephant on the keyboard".

Monk often used the whole-tone scale, played either ascending or descending and covering several octaves. He also had extended improvisations that featured parallel sixths (he also used these in the themes of some of his compositions). His solos also feature space and long notes. Unusually for a bebop-based pianist, as an accompanist and on solo performances he often employed a left-hand stride pattern. A further characteristic of his work as an accompanist was his tendency to stop playing, leaving a soloist with just bass and drums for support. Monk had a particular proclivity for the key of B♭. All of his many blues compositions, including "Blue Monk", "Misterioso", "Blues Five Spot", and "Functional", were composed in B♭; in addition, his signature theme, "Thelonious", largely consists of an incessantly repeated B♭ note.

== Tributes ==
- Music in Monk Time is a 1983 documentary film about Monk and his music that was widely praised by music and film critics.
- The soprano saxophonist Steve Lacy performed as Monk's accompanist in 1960. Monk's tunes became a permanent part of his repertoire in concert and on albums. Lacy recorded many albums entirely focused on Monk's compositions.
- Gunther Schuller wrote the work "Variants on a Theme of Thelonious Monk (Criss-Cross)" in 1960. It first appeared on Schuller's album Jazz Abstractions (1961) and was later performed and recorded by other artists, including Ornette Coleman, Eric Dolphy, and Bill Evans.
- The avant-garde jazz multi-instrumentalist Eric Dolphy's 1964 album Out to Lunch! includes the Monk tribute "Hat and Beard"; Dolphy wrote in the album's liner notes that Monk was "so musical no matter what he's doing, even if he's just walking around."
- Round Midnight Variations is a collection of variations on the song "'Round Midnight" premiered in 2002. Contributing composers included Milton Babbitt, William Bolcom, David Crumb, George Crumb, Michael Daugherty, John Harbison, Joel Hoffman, Aaron Jay Kernis, Gerald Levinson, Tobias Picker, Frederic Rzewski, Augusta Read Thomas, and Michael Torke.
- "Thelonious" Repertory Ensemble: Buell Neidlinger's tribute band (1981–1989).
- Stefano Benni's 2005 Misterioso: A Journey into the Silence of Thelonious Monk was staged as a theatre production featuring Monk's music, directed by Filomena Campus, at the Edinburgh Festival in 2008, at the Riverside Studios in 2009, and at a variety of venues in the following years. In 2017, an Arts Council England–sponsored international Monk Misterioso Tour was launched at the British Library in October, culminating with a new dramatized production of Misterioso: A Journey into the Silence of Thelonious Monk at Kings Place to close the London Jazz Festival's celebration of the centenary of Monk's birth, featuring Campus alongside Cleveland Watkiss, Pat Thomas, Rowland Sutherland, Orphy Robinson, Dudley Phillips, and Mark Mondesir.
- John Beasley founded the MONK'estra, a big band, which celebrates Monk's and other classic compositions with a contemporary twist, incorporating Afro-Cuban rhythms, modern jazz playing, hip-hop, and traditional big band instrumentation, along with originals by Beasley.
- Jeff Beck's 1975 album Blow by Blow contains the track "Thelonious", a tribute to Monk written by Stevie Wonder.

=== Tribute albums ===
The following tribute albums to Monk have been released:

- Reflections (1958) by Steve Lacy
- Lookin' at Monk (1961) by the Johnny Griffin and Eddie "Lockjaw" Davis Quintet
- Evidence (1962) by Steve Lacy and Don Cherry
- A Portrait of Thelonious (1965) by the Bud Powell Trio
- Evidence (1981) by Steve Khan (B-side is "Thelonious Monk Medley"; nine tunes)
- Bennie Wallace Plays Monk (1981) by saxophonist Bennie Wallace
- Four in One (1982) by Sphere – features former Monk sidemen Charlie Rouse (tenor saxophone), Kenny Barron (piano), Buster Williams (bass), and Ben Riley (drums)
- Sings Thelonious Monk (1982) by singer Soesja Citroen, featuring the Cees Slinger Octet
- Thelonica (1983) by pianist Tommy Flanagan
- Light Blue: Arthur Blythe Plays Thelonious Monk (1983) by saxophonist Arthur Blythe
- That's The Way I Feel Now: A Tribute to Thelonious Monk (1984), an album featuring different groupings of rock and jazz musicians on each song, including Steve Lacy, Donald Fagen, Todd Rundgren, Peter Frampton, Carla Bley, Joe Jackson, Gil Evans and Was (Not Was)
- Monk Suite: Kronos Quartet Plays Music of Thelonious Monk (1985) by the Kronos Quartet with bassist Ron Carter
- Six Monk's Compositions (1987) (1987) by Anthony Braxton
- Only Monk (1987) by Steve Lacy
- Carmen Sings Monk (1988) by Carmen McRae
- Rumba Para Monk (1988) by Jerry González
- Monk in Motian (1989) by Paul Motian, featuring Joe Lovano, Bill Frisell, Geri Allen, and Dewey Redman
- Thelonious Sphere Monk: Dreaming of the Masters Series Vol. 2, by the Art Ensemble of Chicago with Cecil Taylor
- Epistrophy (1991) by pianist Ran Blake
- We See (1993) by Steve Lacy
- Monk's Modern Music (1994) by pianist Rick Roe with bassist Rodney Whitaker and drummer Gregory Hutchinson
- The Fo'tet Plays Monk (1995) by Ralph Peterson Jr.
- E.s.t. Esbjörn Svensson Trio Plays Monk (1996) by the Esbjörn Svensson Trio
- Monk on Monk (1997) by T. S. Monk, featuring Herbie Hancock, Ron Carter, Wayne Shorter, Grover Washington Jr., Roy Hargrove, Clark Terry, Geri Allen, and others
- Brilliant Corners: The Music of Thelonious Monk (1997) by Bill Holman
- Thelonious: Fred Hersch Plays Monk (1997) by Fred Hersch
- Interpretations of Monk, Vol. 1 (1997) by Muhal Richard Abrams and Barry Harris
- Interpretations of Monk, Vol. 2 (1998) by Anthony Davis and Mal Waldron
- Green Chimneys: The Music of Thelonious Monk (1999) by Andy Summers
- In the Key of Monk (1999) by Jessica Williams
- Standard Time, Vol. 4: Marsalis Plays Monk (1999) by Wynton Marsalis
- School Days (2002; rec. 1963), by Steve Lacy and Roswell Rudd, with Henry Grimes and Denis Charles
- Thelonious Moog (2003) by Steve Million and Joe "Guido" Welsh
- Monk's Casino (2005) by pianist Alexander von Schlippenbach – a triple CD set that includes every composition by Monk. According to the album's liner notes by critic John Corbett, this is the first comprehensive recording of all of Monk's songs.
- An Open Letter to Thelonious (2008) by Ellis Marsalis Jr.
- Monk (2008) by Peter Bernstein
- Bobby Broom Plays for Monk (2009) by Bobby Broom
- In Monk's Mood (2009) by John Tchicai
- Friday the 13th: The Micros Play Monk (2010) by the Microscopic Septet
- Melodious Monk: A New Look at an Old Master (2011) by Kim Pensyl and Phil DeGreg
- The Monk Project (2012) by Jimmy Owens
- Baritone Monk (2012) by the Claire Daly Quartet
- Talk Thelonious (2015) by Terry Adams
- Joey. Monk. Live! (2017) by Joey Alexander
- John Beasley Presents MONK'estra, Vol. 1 (2016) by John Beasley
- John Beasley presents MONK'estra, Vol. 2 (2017) by John Beasley
- Duck Baker Plays Monk (2017) by Duck Baker, featuring solo fingerstyle acoustic guitar arrangements of Monk's music
- The Monk: Live at Bimhuis (2018) by Miho Hazama and the Metropole Orkest Big Band
- Work: The Complete Composition of Thelonious Monk, Solo Guitar (2018) by Miles Okazaki
- Thelonious Sphere Monk (2018) by MAST
- Monk's Dreams: The Complete Compositions of Thelonious Sphere Monk (2018) by Frank Kimbrough
- Monks (2019) by Borah Bergman, Wilber Morris, and Sunny Murray
- Monk: Fifteen Piano Reflections (2020) by Stefano Travaglini
- Steelonious (2016) by Mike Neer, featuring Monk compositions played on lap steel guitar

== Other references to Monk ==
- The comedian Felonious Munk and the music producer Thelonious Martin both adopted stage names based on Monk's name.
- The punk rock band Thelonious Monster was named after Monk.
- The 2021 novel Felonious Monk by William Kotzwinkle was named after Monk.
- The footballer Thelo Aasgaard is named after Monk, as his father, cellist Jonathan Aasgaard, is a fan.
- The protagonist of the 2001 novel Erasure, and its 2023 film adaptation American Fiction, is named Thelonious and nicknamed "Monk".
- The character of McClintic Sphere in Thomas Pynchon's 1963 novel V. is based on Monk and Ornette Coleman. In Pynchon's 2006 novel Against the Day, a quote from Monk serves as the opening epigraph: "It's always night, or we wouldn't need light."
- The rapper Common and the producer/rapper J Dilla collaborated on the track "Thelonius" on the former's 2000 breakout album Like Water for Chocolate. The song makes no direct reference to Monk's career.

== Awards and accolades ==
In 1993, Monk was awarded the Grammy Lifetime Achievement Award. In 2006, he was awarded a Special Pulitzer Prize for "a body of distinguished and innovative musical composition that has had a significant and enduring impact on the evolution of jazz".

The Thelonious Monk Institute of Jazz was established in 1986 by the Monk family and Maria Fisher. Its mission is to offer public school-based jazz education programs for young people around the globe, helping students develop imaginative thinking, creativity, curiosity, a positive self-image, and a respect for their own and others' cultural heritage. In addition to hosting an annual International Jazz Competition since 1987, the institute also helped, through its partnership with UNESCO, designate April 30, 2012, as the first annual International Jazz Day. It was renamed the Herbie Hancock Institute of Jazz in 2019.

Monk was inducted into the North Carolina Music Hall of Fame in 2009.

== Bibliography ==
- Daoudi, Youssef (2018). Monk: Thelonious, Pannonica, and the Friendship Behind a Musical Revolution. First Second. ISBN 978-1-62672-434-1.
- Fitterling, Thomas (1997). Thelonious Monk: His Life and Music. Berkeley Hills Books. ISBN 978-0-9653774-1-6.
- Giddins, Gary (2018). Rhythm-a-ning: Jazz Tradition and Innovation. Hachette. ISBN 978-0-306-80987-3.
- Gordon, Lorraine (2006). Alive at the Village Vanguard: My Life in and Out of Jazz Time. Hal Leonard Corporation. ISBN 978-1-61774-916-2.
- Gourse, Leslie (1997). Straight No Chaser: The Life and Genius of Thelonious Monk. Books with Attitude. ISBN 978-0-02-864656-5.
- Kelley, Robin D. G. (2010). Thelonious Monk: The Life and Times of an American Original. Free Press. ISBN 978-1-4391-9046-3. OCLC 180755951.
- Mathieson, Kenny (2012). Giant Steps: Bebop and the Creators of Modern Jazz, 1945–65. Canongate Books. ISBN 978-0-85786-617-2.
- Owens, Thomas (1996). Bebop: The Music and Its Players. Oxford University Press. ISBN 978-0-19-510651-0.
- Porter, Lewis (1998). John Coltrane: His Life and Music. University of Michigan Press. ISBN 0-472-10161-7.
- Solis, Gabriel (2007). Monk's Music: Thelonious Monk and Jazz History in the Making. University of California Press. ISBN 978-0-520-94096-3.
- van der Bliek, Rob (2001). The Thelonious Monk Reader. Oxford University. ISBN 978-0-19-028396-4. LCCN 00-037475.
