= 2 Compositions (Ensemble) 1989/1991 =

Studio album by Anthony Braxton
- Released: 1992
- Recorded: October 23, 1989 and February 23, 1991
- Studio: Sendesaal Hessischer Rundfunk, Frankfurt, Germany and Bürgerhaus Wilhelmsburg, Hamburg, Germany
- Genre: Jazz
- Length: 72:59
- Label: HatART; CD 6086
- Producer: Hansalbrecht Stiebler, Michael Naura

Anthony Braxton chronology
Eight (+3) Tristano Compositions, 1989: For Warne Marsh (1989)	2 Compositions (Ensemble) 1989/1991 (1992)	Duets: Hamburg 1991 (1991)

2 Compositions (Ensemble) 1989/1991 is an album featuring ensemble performances of compositions by Anthony Braxton which was recorded in Germany in 1989 and 1991 and released on the HatART label.

Professional ratings
Review scores
Source	Rating
Allmusic	2/5 stars

== Track listing ==
All compositions by Anthony Braxton.

1. "Composition No. 147" – 16:50
2. "Composition No. 151: Part I" – 24:26
3. "Composition No. 151: Part II" – 31:43

== Personnel ==
=== Track 1 ===
Ensemble Modern Frankfurt conducted by Diego Masson

- Soloists: Joachim Klemm, John Corbett, Roland Diry – clarinet
- Anne La Berge, Dietmar Wiesner – flute
- Catherine Milliken – oboe
- Wolfgang Stryi – bass clarinet, saxophone
- Veit Scholz – bassoon
- Achim Reus, Vanessa King – cor anglais
- Julian Brewer, Tony Cross – trumpet
- Uwe Dierksen, Norbert Hardegen – trombone
- Rainer Römer, Rumi Ogawa-Helferich – percussion
- Karin Schmeer – harp
- Hermann Kretzschmar, Ueli Wiget – piano
- Klaus Obermauer – guitar
- Hilary Sturt, Peter Rundel, Sebastian Gottschick, Thomas Hofer – violin
- Almut Steinhausen, Werner Dickel – viola
- Friedemann Dähn, Michael Stirling – cello
- Thomas Fichter – double bass

=== Tracks 2 & 3 ===
Creative Music Ensemble conducted by Anthony Braxton

- Adam Zablocki – flute
- Wolfgang Schubert – cor anglais
- Vlatko Kučan – soprano saxophone
- Klaus Roemer – alto saxophone
- Bernd Reincke – baritone saxophone
- Georgia Charlotte Hoppe – bass clarinet
- Hermann Süss, Tobias Netta, Tosten Maas – trumpet
- Ferdinand v. Seebach, Heinz-Erich Gödecke – trombone
- Dizi Fisher – tuba
- Andreas Nock – guitar
- Dorothea Geiger, Mauretta Heinzelmann, Nicola Kruse – violin
- Mike Rutledge – viola
- Cornelia Gottberg, Ralf Werner – cello
- Frank Skriptschinsky, Johannes Huth, Peter Niklas Wilson – double bass
- "Buggy" Braune – piano
- Hans Schüttler – synthesizer
- Bernd v. Ostrowski – vibraphone
- Dirk Dhonau – marimbaphone
- Björn Lücker, Dieter Gostisha, Heinz Lichius – percussion
