= Time zone (disambiguation) =

A time zone is a region of the Earth that has adopted the same standard time.

Time zone can also refer to:

- Time Zone (band), experimental hip-hop group headed by Afrika Bambaataa
- Time Zones (album), a 1977 album by Richard Teitelbaum Anthony Braxton
- Time Zone (video game), historical video game
- Timezone (video arcades), a chain of video arcade centers based in Australia
- "Time Zones" (Mad Men), S7/E1 of Mad Men
