= Blinks (album) =

Live album by Steve Lacy Two, Five & Six
- Released: 1984
- Recorded: February 12, 1983
- Venue: Rote Fabrik, Zurich, Switzerland
- Genre: Jazz
- Length: 102:01 CD reissue with additional tracks
- Label: hat ART hat ART 2006
- Producer: Pia Uehlinger, Werner X. Uehlinger

Steve Lacy chronology
Prospectus (1982)	Blinks (1984)	Outcome (1983)

Blinks is a live album by soprano saxophonist Steve Lacy, which was recorded in Switzerland in 1983 and first released on the hat ART label in 1984 as a double LP. The album was rereleased as a double CD in 1997 with two additional tracks from the concert and a single CD with only five tracks in 2001 as Blinks...Zürich Live 1983.

== Reception ==
Professional ratings
Review scores
Source	Rating
Allmusic	4.5/5 stars
All About Jazz	5/5 stars

The Allmusic review by Thom Jurek stated "the Steve Lacy Sextet changed not only our own ideas about jazz, but also the bandleader's. Evidenced by this live recording of the Sextet, two CDs of sheer, unadulterated musical communication, debate, and resolution that took place far below the surface of six people playing together, it is obvious that the Steve Lacy Sextet will go down in history as one of the great bands in the history of the music ... it has become one of the two or three most necessary recordings of the Steve Lacy Sextet to own". All About Jazz said "Here, on this album, are some of the finest examples of Lacy's work ... In every chart, the band leaps with courage and joy into the unknown". Glenn Astarita observed "it's a desert island disc that reemphasizes Lacy's enduring inscription as an innovative modern era idealist who possessed a voice unlike any other".

== Track listing ==
All compositions by Steve Lacy

1. "Stamps" – 7:33 Additional track on CD reissues
2. "Blinks" – 16:43
3. "Prospectus" – 7:02 Additional track on CD reissues
4. "Wickets" – 18:51
5. "Three Points" – 14:20 Omitted from single CD reissue
6. "Clichés" – 23:18
7. "The Whammies" – 14:43 Omitted from single CD reissue

== Personnel ==
- Steve Lacy – soprano saxophone, voice
- Steve Potts – alto saxophone, soprano saxophone
- Irene Aebi – cello, violin, voice (tracks 1–4, 6 & 7)
- Jean-Jacques Avenel – bass (tracks 1–4, 6 & 7)
- Oliver Johnson – drums (tracks 1–4, 6 & 7)
- Bobby Few – piano (track 7)
