= Memoirs (jazz album) =

Studio album by Paul Bley, Charlie Haden and Paul Motian
- Released: 1990
- Recorded: July 20, 1990
- Studio: Mondail Sound, Milano, Italy
- Genre: Jazz
- Length: 70:49
- Label: Soul Note
- Producer: Giovanni Bonandrini

Paul Bley chronology
BeBopBeBopBeBopBeBop (1989)	Memoirs (1990)	12 (+6) In a Row (1990)

Memoirs is an album by pianist Paul Bley, bassist Charlie Haden and drummer Paul Motian recorded in 1990 and released on the Italian Soul Note label.

== Reception ==
The Allmusic review by Josef Woodard awarded the album 3 stars stating "Memoirs serves as a tidy summation of Paul Bley's gifts as an individual and musical conversationalist". The Penguin Guide to Jazz said "A dream lineup that promises much and delivers royally... Tremendous stuff".

Professional ratings
Review scores
Source	Rating
Allmusic	3/5 stars
The Penguin Guide to Jazz	4/4 stars

== Track listing ==
All compositions by Paul Bley except as indicated

1. "Memoirs" - 9:50
2. "Monk's Dream" (Thelonious Monk) - 7:55
3. "Dark Victory" (Charlie Haden) - 4:19
4. "Latin Genetics" (Ornette Coleman) - 7:49
5. "This Is the Hour" (Paul Motian) - 6:09
6. "Insanity" - 4:14
7. "New Flame" (Haden) - 9:45
8. "Sting a Ring" (Motian) - 7:07
9. "Blues for Josh" (Haden) - 5:27
10. "Enough Is Enough" (Motian) - 8:14

- Recorded at Mondial Sound in Milano, Italy on July 20, 1990.

== Personnel ==
- Paul Bley — piano
- Charlie Haden — bass
- Paul Motian — drums
