= Alto Saxophone Improvisations 1979 =

Studio album by Anthony Braxton
- Released: 1979
- Recorded: November 28–29, 1978 and June 21, 1979
- Genre: Jazz
- Length: 84:45
- Label: Arista
- Producer: Michael Cuscuna

Anthony Braxton chronology
| Solo (Milano) 1979 (1979) | Alto Saxophone Improvisations 1979 (1979) | One in Two – Two in One (1979) |

Alto Saxophone Improvisations 1979 is a solo album by American saxophonist and composer Anthony Braxton, recorded in 1978 and 1979 and released on the Arista label. The tracks were subsequently reissued on The Complete Arista Recordings of Anthony Braxton on Mosaic Records in 2008.

== Reception ==
The AllMusic review by Scott Yanow stated: "The thoughtful yet emotional improvisations contain enough variety to hold one's interest throughout despite the sparse setting."

Professional ratings
Review scores
| Source | Rating |
|---|---|
| AllMusic | 4/5 stars |
| DownBeat | 4.5/5 stars |

== Track listing ==
All compositions by Anthony Braxton except as indicated

1. "Composition 77 A" - 7:30
2. "Composition 77 C" - 6:25
3. "Red Top" (Ben Kynard, Lionel Hampton) - 6:13
4. "Composition 77 D" - 7:30
5. "Composition 77 E" - 4:25
6. "Composition 26 F" - 6:30
7. "Composition 77 F" - 6:19
8. "Composition 26 B" - 6:58
9. "Along Came Betty" (Benny Golson) - 8:00
10. "Composition 77 G" - 5:15
11. "Composition 26 E" - 6:20
12. "Giant Steps" (John Coltrane) - 6:20
13. "Composition 77 H" - 7:00
  - Recorded at Big Apple Studios in New York City on November 28, 1978 (tracks 1, 2, 4 & 7), November 29, 1978 (tracks 3, 6, 8-11 & 13), and June 21, 1979 (tracks 5 & 12)

== Personnel ==
- Anthony Braxton – alto saxophone
