= The Long March (album) =

Live album by Max Roach & Archie Shepp
- Released: 1979
- Recorded: August 31, 1979
- Genre: Jazz
- Length: 93:11
- Label: Hathut
- Producer: Werner X. Uehlinger

Max Roach chronology
M'Boom (1979)	The Long March (1979)	One in Two - Two in One (1979)

Archie Shepp chronology
Tray of Silver (1979)	The Long March (1979)	Attica Blues Big Band Live at Palais De Glaces (1979)

The Long March is a live album by American jazz drummer Max Roach and saxophonist Archie Shepp recorded in 1979 for the Swiss Hathut label.

== Reception ==
The AllMusic review by Thom Jurek awarded the album 4½ stars stating "The Long March is one of the truly important duet records in post-bop era jazz history".

Professional ratings
Review scores
Source	Rating
All About Jazz	4.5/5 stars
AllMusic	4.5/5 stars

== Track listing ==
All compositions by Max Roach except as indicated

1. "J.C. Moses" - 5:52
2. "Sophisticated Lady" (Duke Ellington, Irving Mills, Mitchell Parish) - 5:46
3. "The Long March" - 26:17
4. "U-Jaa-Ma" (Archie Shepp) - 12:30
5. "Triptych" - 7:26
6. "Giant Steps" (John Coltrane) - 5:35
7. "South Africa Goddamn" - 20:09
8. "It's Time" - 9:36

- Recorded at the Jazz Festival Willisau '79 in Willisau, Switzerland on August 31, 1979

== Personnel ==
- Archie Shepp - tenor saxophone
- Max Roach - drums
