= Hat Hut Records =

Swiss record label

Hathut Records
- Founded: 1974
- Founder: Werner Xavier Uehlinger
- Distributor: Squidco
- Genre: Free jazz, classical
- Country of origin: Switzerland
- Location: Basel
- Official website: hathut.com

Hathut Records is a Swiss record company and label founded by Werner Xavier Uehlinger in 1974 that specializes in jazz and classical music. The name of the label comes from the artwork of Klaus Baumgartner. Hathut encompasses the labels hat ART, hatOLOGY, and hat NOIR.

The label's first releases were by Joe McPhee. Its roster includes Ray Anderson, Anthony Braxton, Lisle Ellis, Georg Graewe, Gerry Hemingway, Franz Koglmann, Steve Lacy, Joelle Leandre, Myra Melford, Paul Plimley, Max Roach, Horace Tapscott, Cecil Taylor, Mike Westbrook, John Zorn, Vienna Art Orchestra, David Murray, Luzia von Wyl, Archie Shepp, Jimmy Lyons, Tony Coe, Michel Portal, and Sun Ra,

The label progressed through a range of series featuring distinct packaging styles, from the initial runs of 12-inch LPs with alphabetical and numerical catalog numbers with sleeve drawings and paintings by Klaus Baumgärtner, to elaborately packaged boxes with inserts and postcards, and then black and white photography on CD releases.

From 1985 until 2000 the label received funding from the Swiss Bank Corporation. Its catalogue was acquired by the Belgian music publisher Outhere Music in 2017.

== Discography ==
=== HatHut "ABC" Series ===
Werner X. Uehlinger started the HatHut label in 1975 to release recordings by Joe McPhee and soon followed with albums by emerging avant-garde jazz musicians including Steve Lacy, David Murray, David S. Ware and Jimmy Lyons. The first releases on HatHut between 1975 and 1979 had alphabetic catalog numbers starting with A and ending with a triple LP Y/Z/Z making a total of twenty albums in the series.

Catalog	Artist	Album
HAT A	Joe McPhee	Black Magic Man
HAT B	Joe McPhee	The Willisau Concert
HAT C	Joe McPhee	Tenor
HAT D	Joe McPhee	Rotation
HAT E	The Milo Fine Free Jazz Ensemble	Hah!
HAT F	Steve Lacy	Clinkers
HAT G	Raymond Boni and Claude Bernard	Pot-Pourri pour Parce Que
HAT H	The Milo Fine Free Jazz Ensemble	The Constant Extension of Inescapable Tradition
HAT I/J	Joe McPhee	Graphics
HAT K/L	Steve Lacy	Stamps
HAT M/N	Baikida Carroll	The Spoken Word
HAT O	Joe McPhee	Variations on a Blue Line
HAT P	Joe McPhee	Glasses
HAT Q	Phillip Wilson	Esoteric
HAT R	André Jaume	Saxanimalier
HAT S/T	Joe McPhee, Milo Fine and Steve Gnitka (MFG)	MFG in Minnesota
HAT U/V	David Murray	3D Family
HAT W	David S. Ware	Birth of a Being
HAT X	Irène Schweizer and Rüdiger Carl	The Very Centre of Middle Europe
HAT Y/Z/Z	Jimmy Lyons (saxophonist)	Push Pull

=== HatHut Numeric "R0" Series ===
From 1980 to 1981, following the last alphabetic catalog number, HatHut releases had a written numeric catalog number followed by a bracketed "RO" code where the first digit of the code indicated a single ("1RO"), double ("2RO") or triple ("3RO") LP. A total of 22 albums were released in this series.

Catalog	Artist	Album
hat Hut ONE (1R01)	Joe McPhee	Old Eyes
hat Hut TWO (3R02)	Cecil Taylor	One Too Many Salty Swift and Not Goodbye
hat Hut THREE (2R03)	Steve Lacy	The Way
hat Hut FOUR (1R04)	Billy Bang	Distinction Without a Difference
hat Hut FIVE (2R05)	Dave Burrell	Windward Passages
hat Hut SIX (2R06)	Max Roach and Anthony Braxton	One in Two – Two in One
hat Hut SEVEN (1R07)	Jerome Cooper	For the People
hat Hut EIGHT (1R08)	Jerry Chardonnens, Léon Francioli and Radu Malfatti	Humanimal
hat Hut NINE (1R09)	Peter Kuhn	Ghost of a Trance
hat Hut TEN (1R10)	Antonello Salis	Orange Juice/Nice Food
hat Hut ELEVEN (1R11)	Daunik Lazro	The Entrance Gates of Tshee Park
hat Hut TWELVE (2R12)	André Jaume and Joe McPhee featuring Raymond Boni	Tales and Prophecies
hat Hut THIRTEEN (2R13)	Max Roach and Archie Shepp	The Long March
hat Hut FOURTEEN (2R14)	Steve Lacy	Capers
hat Hut FIFTEEN (2R15)	Burton Greene and Alan Silva	The Ongoing Strings
hat Hut SIXTEEN (2R16)	Cecil Taylor	It Is in the Brewing Luminous
hat Hut SEVENTEEN (2R17)	Sun Ra	Sunrise in Different Dimensions
hat Hut EIGHTEEN (1R18)	MIT	Knoten
hat Hut NINETEEN (2R19)	Anthony Braxton	Performance 9/1/79
hat Hut TWENTY (1R20)	Steve Lacy and Steve Potts featuring Irene Aebi	Tips
hat Hut TWENTYONE (2R21)	Jimmy Lyons (saxophonist) and Sunny Murray	Jump Up / What to Do About
hat Hut TWENTYTWO (2R22)	Pierre Favre, Léon Francioli and Michel Portal	Arrivederci Le Chouartse

=== Hat MUSICS Series ===
From 1981 to 1983 Hathut released a series of seventeen albums on the hat MUSICS label.

Catalog	Artist	Album
hat MUSICS 3500	Albert Ayler	Lörrach / Paris 1966
hat MUSICS 3501	Steve Lacy and Mal Waldron	Snake Out
hat MUSICS 3502	Siegfried Kessler and Daunik Lazro	Aeros
hat MUSICS 3503	Jimmy Lyons (saxophonist) featuring Karen Borca	Riffs
hat MUSICS 3504	Brion Gysin	Orgy Boys
hat MUSICS 3505	Alain Monnier	Tribulat
hat MUSICS 3506	George Sams	Nomadic Winds
hat MUSICS 3507	Eduardo M. Kohan and Circo del Arca	Dies Irae
hat MUSICS 3508	Cecil Taylor	The Eighth
hat MUSICS 3509	Bernd Konrad	Traumtänzer
hat MUSICS 3510	Raymond Boni	L'Homme Étoilé
hat MUSICS 3511	Lauren Newton	Timbre
hat MUSICS 3512	Billy Bang and Denis Charles	Bangception
hat MUSICS 3513	Musica Libera	Dialog & Begegnung
hat MUSICS 3514	Joe McPhee Po Music	Oleo
hat MUSICS 3515	Steve Lacy and Mal Waldron	Herbe de L'Oubli
hat MUSICS 3516	David Murray	3D Family Vol. 1
hat MUSICS 3517	Donald Knaack and Peggy Knaack	Inside the Plastic Lotus

=== HatHut hat ART discography: LPs ===
From 1981 to 1987 Hathut released a total of fifty-one albums in the initial hat ART LP series, many of which were packaged in fold-open cardboard box like sleeves which sometimes included postcards, additional 45rpm EPs, 7" singles, or single sided albums.

Catalog	Artist	Album
hat ART 1980/81	Vienna Art Orchestra	Concerto Piccolo
hat ART 1982/83	Steve Lacy	Ballets
hat ART 1984	Anthony Braxton	Composition 98
hat ART 1985/86	Steve Lacy and Brion Gysin	Songs
hat ART 1987/88	Joe McPhee Po Music	Topology
hat ART 1989/90	André Jaume	Musique Pour 8: L'Oc
hat ART 1991/92	Vienna Art Orchestra	Suite for the Green Eighties
hat ART 1993/94	Cecil Taylor	Garden
hat ART 1995/96	Anthony Braxton	Open Aspects '82
hat ART 1997/98	Catalogue	Pénétration
hat ART 1999/2000	Vienna Art Orchestra	From No Time to Rag Time
hat ART 2001	Steve Lacy Seven	Prospectus
hat ART 2002	Michel Redolfi	Sonic Waters
hat ART 2003	André Jaume	Musique Pour 3 & 8: Errance
hat ART 2004	Coe, Oxley & Co.	Nutty (On) Willisau
hat ART 2005	Vienna Art Orchestra	The Minimalism of Erik Satie
hat ART 2006	Steve Lacy Two, Five & Six	Blinks
hat ART 2007	Michel Portal, Léon Francioli and Pierre Favre	Arrivederci Le Chouartse
hat ART 2008	Urs Blöchlinger Tettet	Neurotica
hat ART 2009	Albert Ayler	Live Lörrach/Germany and Paris/France 1966
hat ART 2010	Daunik Lazro	Sweet Zee
hat ART 2012	Mike Westbrook Orchestra	On Duke's Birthday
hat ART 2013	Rova	Saxophone Diplomacy
hat ART 2014	Steve Lacy Three	N.Y. Capers
hat ART 2015	Steve Lacy and Mal Waldron	Herbe de L'oubli - Snake-Out
hat ART 2016	David Murray	3D Family
hat ART 2017	Sun Ra Arkestra	Sunrise in Different Dimensions
hat ART 2018	Werner Lüdi Sunnymoon	Lunatico
hat ART 2019	Anthony Braxton	Performance for Quartet 1979
hat ART 2020	Pauline Oliveros	The Well and the Gentle
hat ART 2021	Alesia Cosmos	Aéroproducts
hat ART 2022	Steve Lacy Nine	Futurities
hat ART 2023	Fritz Hauser	Solodrumming
hat ART 2024	Vienna Art Orchestra	Perpetuum Mobile
hat ART 2025	Dave Burrell	Windward Passages
hat ART 2027	Ganelin Trio	Non Troppo
Hat ART 2028	Jimmy Lyons (saxophonist) & Sunny Murray Trio	Jump Up / What to Do About
hat ART 2029	Steve Lacy Five	The Way
hat ART 2030	Marianne Schroeder	Braxton & Stockhausen
hat ART 2031	Mike Westbrook Trio	Love for Sale
hat ART 2032	Rova	The Crowd: For Elias Canetti
hat ART 2033	Joe McPhee Po Music	A Future Retrospective
hat ART 2034	John Zorn	Cobra
hat ART 2035	Jacques Diennet	Mante
hat ART 2036	Cecil Taylor	The Eighth
hat ART 2037	Peter Schaerli Quintett	Schnipp Schnapp
hat ART 2038	Steve Lacy and Mal Waldron	Let's Call This
hat ART 2039	Franz Koglmann	Ich
hat ART 2040	Mike Westbrook	Westbrook-Rossini
hat ART 3011	Cecil Taylor	One Too Many Salty Swift and Not Goodbye
hat ART 4026	Max Roach	The Long March: Duos with Archie Shepp and Anthony Braxton

=== HatHut hatART discography: CDs ===
Hathut began releasing compact discs on the hat ART label in 1988 with a 6000 series catalog numbers featuring new music and reissues of vinyl albums, sometimes with additional material. The series featured 201 releases and concluded in 1997 when the hatART label was replaced by two labels: hatOLOGY for jazz releases and hat(new)ART for classical music.

Catalog	Artist	Album	Notes
hat ART CD 6000	Various Artists	Kimus #1	
hat ART CD 6001	Herbert Distel	Die Reise	
hat ART CD 6002	Mike Westbrook	Westbrook-Rossini	Reissue of hat ART 2040
hat ART CD 6003	Franz Koglmann	About Yesterdays Ezzthetics	
hat ART CD 6004	Richard Teitelbaum	Concerto Grosso (1985) For Human Concertino and Robotic Ripieno	
hat ART CD 6005	John Zorn, George Lewis and Bill Frisell	News for Lulu	
hat ART CD 6006	Marianne Schroeder	Giacinto Scelsi: Suites Nr. 9 And Nr. 10 for Piano	
hat ART CD 6007	Habarigani	Habarigani	
hat ART CD 6008	George Gruntz Concert Jazz Band '87	Happening Now!	
hat ART CD 6009	Pauline Oliveros	The Roots of the Moment	
hat ART CD 6010	Fritz Hauser	Zwei	
hat ART CD 6011	Arnold Dreyblatt and the Orchestra of Excited Strings	Propellers in Love	Reissue of 1986 Künstlerhaus Bethanien LP
hat ART CD 6012	Cecil Taylor	It Is in the Brewing Luminous	Reissue of hat Hut SIXTEEN (2R16)
hat ART CD 6013	Urs Leimgruber	Statement of an Antirider	
hat ART CD 6014	Steve Lacy Four	Morning Joy (Live at Sunset Paris)	
hat ART CD 6015	Sato Michihiro	Rodan	
hat ART CD 6016	Bobby Bradford-John Carter Quintet	Comin' On	
hat ART CD 6017	Fritz Hauser	Die Trommel & Die Welle	
hat ART CD 6018	Franz Koglmann	Orte der Geometrie	
hat ART CD 6019	Anthony Braxton	Compositions 99, 101, 107 & 139	
hat ART CD 6020	David Murray	3D Family	Partial reissue of HAT U/V
hat ART CD 6021	Mike Westbrook Orchestra	On Duke's Birthday	Reissue of hat ART 2012
hat ART CD 6022	Michel Portal, Léon Francioli and Pierre Favre	Arrivederci Le Chouartse	Reissue of hat Hut TWENTYTWO (2R22)
hat ART CD 6023	Fritz Hauser	Solodrumming	Partial reissue of hat ART 2023
hat ART CD 6024	Vienna Art Orchestra	The Minimalism of Erik Satie	Reissue of hat ART 2005
hat ART CD 6025	Anthony Braxton	Seven Compositions (Trio) 1989	
hat ART CD 6026	Michel Redolfi	Sonic Waters #2 (Underwater Music) 1983 - 1990	
hat ART CD 6027	Joe McPhee Po Music	Topology	Reissue of hat ART 1987/88
hat ART CD 6028	Georg Gräwe & GrubenKlangOrchester	Songs and Variations	
hat ART CD 6029	Maarten Altena Ensemble	Quotl	
hat ART CD 6030	Max Roach and Anthony Braxton	One in Two – Two in One	Reissue of hat Hut SIX (2R06)
hat ART CD 6031	Steve Lacy Nine	Futurities, Part I	Partial reissue of hat ART 2022
hat ART CD 6032	Steve Lacy Nine	Futurities, Part II	Partial reissue of hat ART 2022
hat ART CD 6033	Franz Koglmann	Ich	Reissue of hat ART 2039
hat ART CD 6034	Ton-Art	Zú	
hat ART CD 6035	Marianne Schroeder	Morton Feldman: Piano	
hat ART CD 6036	Cecil Taylor	The Eighth	Reissue of hat MUSICS 3508
hat ART CD 6037	Fritz Hauser and Stephan Grieder	The Mirror	
hat ART CD 6038	Vienna Art Orchestra	Concerto Piccolo	Reissue of hat ART 1980/81
hat ART CD 6039	Albert Ayler	Live Lörrach/Germany and Paris/France	Reissue of hat MUSICS 3500
hat ART CD 6040	John Zorn	Cobra	Reissue of hat ART 2034 with additional tracks
hat ART CD 6041	Max Roach and Archie Shepp	The Long March Part 1	Partial reissue of hat Hut THIRTEEN (2R13)
hat ART CD 6042	Max Roach and Archie Shepp	The Long March Part 2	Partial reissue of hat Hut THIRTEEN (2R13)
hat ART CD 6043	Georg Gräwe, Ernst Reijseger and Gerry Hemingway	Sonic Fiction	
hat ART CD 6044	Anthony Braxton	Performance (Quartet) 1979	Reissue of hat Hut NINETEEN (2R19)
hat ART CD 6045	Steve Lacy and Brion Gysin	Songs	Reissue of hat ART 1985/86
hat ART CD 6046	Coe, Oxley & Co.	Nutty	Reissue of hat ART 2044
hat ART CD 6047	Joe McPhee Po Music	Old Eyes & Mysteries	Reissue of hat Hut ONE (1R01) with additional tracks
hat ART CD 6048	Franz Koglmann	A White Line	
hat ART CD 6049	Urs Leimgrube	Ungleich	
hat ART CD 6050	Cecil Taylor	Garden Part 1	Partial reissue of hat ART 1993/94
hat ART CD 6051	Cecil Taylor	Garden Part 2	Partial reissue of hat ART 1993/94
hat ART CD 6052	Anthony Braxton	Eight (+3) Tristano Compositions, 1989: For Warne Marsh	
hat ART CD 6053	Horace Tapscott	The Dark Tree Volume 1	
hat ART CD 6054	Vienna Art Orchestra	Suite for the Green Eighties	Reissue of hat ART 1991/92
hat ART CD 6055	John Zorn, George Lewis and Bill Frisell	More News for Lulu	
hat ART CD 6056	Maarten Altena Octet	Rif	Reissue of 1987 Claxon CD
hat ART CD 6057	Joe McPhee Po Music	Linear B	
hat ART CD 6058	André Jaume	Musique Pour 8: L'Oc	Reissue of hat ART 1989/90
hat ART CD 6059	Ganelin Trio	Non Troppo	Reissue of hat ART 2027
hat ART CD 6060	Herbert Distel	La Stazione	
hat ART CD 6061	Mike Westbrook Trio	Love for Sale	Reissue of hat ART 2031
hat ART CD 6062	Anthony Braxton	Composition 98	Partial reissue of hat ART 1984
hat ART CD 6063	Warne Marsh	Ne Plus Ultra	Reissue of 1970 Revelation LP
hat ART CD 6064	Habarigani	Two	
hat ART CD 6065	Anthony Ortega	New Dance!	Reissue of 1967 Revelation LP with additional tracks
hat ART CD 6066	Frederic Rzewski	The People United Will Never Be Defeated!	
hat ART CD 6067	Fritz Hauser	Pensieri Bianchi (9 Percussionpieces for 2 Hands)	
hat ART CD 6068	Rova	Saxophone Diplomacy	Partial reissue of hat ART 2013
hat ART CD 6069	Steve Lacy and Maarten Altena	High, Low and Order	Reissue of 1979 Claxon LP
hat ART CD 6070	Eberhard Blum, Marianne Schroeder, Robyn Schulkowsky, Frances-Marie Uitti and Nils Vigeland	John Cage: 45' / 34'46.776" / 31'57.9864" / 27'10.554" / 26'1.1499" / 4'33" / Music for Five / Two	
hat ART CD 6071	Jimmy Giuffre 3	Flight, Bremen 1961	
hat ART CD 6072	Jimmy Giuffre 3	Emphasis, Stuttgart 1961	
hat ART CD 6073	Vienna Art Orchestra	From No Time to Rag Time	Reissue of hat ART 1999/2000
hat ART CD 6074	Christy Doran	Christy Doran's Phoenix	
hat ART CD 6075	Anthony Braxton	Quartet (Dortmund) 1976	
hat ART CD 6076	Hildegard Kleeb	Morton Feldman: For Bunita Marcus	
hat ART CD 6077	Ran Blake	That Certain Feeling (George Gershwin Songbook)	
hat ART CD 6078	Franz Koglmann	The Use of Memory	
hat ART CD 6079	Steve Lacy + 19	Itinerary	
hat ART CD 6080	Eberhard Blum, Nils Vigeland and Jan Williams	Morton Feldman: Why Patterns? / Crippled Symmetry	
hat ART CD 6081	Paul Bley	12 (+6) In a Row	
hat ART CD 6082	Maarten Altena	Cities & Streets	
hat ART CD 6083	Horace Tapscott	The Dark Tree Volume 2	
hat ART CD 6084	Gerry Hemingway Quintet	Special Detail	
hat ART CD 6085	John Carter & Bobby Bradford's New Art Jazz Ensemble	Seeking	Reissue of 1969 Revelation LP
hat ART CD 6086	Anthony Braxton	2 Compositions (Ensemble) 1989/1991	
hat ART CD 6087	Steve Lacy & Steve Potts	Flim-Flam	
hat ART CD 6088	Ton-Art	Mal Vu. Mal Dit.	
hat ART CD 6089	Frederic Rzewski	North American Ballads & Squares	
hat ART CD 6090	Cecil Taylor	One Too Many Salty Swift and Not Goodbye	Reissue of hat Hut TWO (3R02)
hat ART CD 6091	Urs Leimgruber & Fritz Hauser	L'Énigmatique	
hat ART CD 6092	Marianne Schroeder	Giacinto Scelsi: Bot-Ba	
hat ART CD 6093	Franz Koglmann	L'Heure Bleue	
hat ART CD 6094	Maarten Altena Ensemble	Code	
hat ART CD 6095	Eberhard Blum	John Cage: Sixty-Two Mesostics Re Merce Cunningham	
hat ART CD 6096	Vienna Art Orchestra	A Notion in Perpetual Motion	Reissue of hat ART 2024
hat ART CD 6097	Joe McPhee Po Music	Oleo & A Future Retrospective	Reissue of hat MUSICS 3514 with additional tracks
hat ART CD 6098	Rova	The Crowd	Reissue of hat ART 2032
hat ART CD 6099	Sun Ra Arkestra	Sunrise in Different Dimensions	Partial reissue of hat Hut SEVENTEEN (2R17)
hat ART CD 6100	Anthony Braxton	Willisau (Quartet) 1991	
hat ART CD 6101	Eberhard Blum, Frances-Marie Uitti and Nils Vigeland	The New York School: Earle Brown, John Cage, Morton Feldman, Christian Wolff	
hat ART CD 6102	Steve Lacy	Remains	
hat ART CD 6103	Joëlle Léandre & Eric Watson	Palimpseste	
hat ART CD 6104	Eberhard Blum, Nils Vigeland and Jan Williams	Morton Feldman: For Philip Guston	
hat ART CD 6105	Christy Doran	What a Band	
hat ART CD 6106	Anthony Braxton	Open Aspects (Duo) 1982	Reissue of hat ART 95/96
hat ART CD 6107	Ensemble Modern conducted by Arturo Tamayo	Morton Feldman: For Samuel Beckett	
hat ART CD 6108	Franz Koglmann	Schlaf Schlemmer, Schlaf Magritte	
hat ART CD 6109	Eberhard Blum	Kurt Schwitters: Ursonate	
hat ART CD 6110	Hans Kennel	Mytha	
hat ART CD 6111	Eberhard Blum	John Cage: Atlas Eclipticalis	
hat ART CD 6112	Hildegard Kleeb	Maria De Alvear: En Amor Duro	
hat ART CD 6113	Oliver Lake Trio	Zaki	
hat ART CD 6114	Eberhard Blum and Steffen Schleiermacher	Kazuo Fukushima: Works for Flute and Piano	
hat ART CD 6115	Vera Beths and Harmen de Boer	Galina Ustvolskaya: 1, Reinbert de Leeuw	
hat ART CD 6116	Steve Lacy Double Sextet	Clangs	
hat ART CD 6117	Paul Plimley & Lisle Ellis	Kaleidoscopes	
hat ART CD 6118	Paul Bley, Franz Koglmann and Gary Peacock	Annette	
hat ART CD 6119	Anthony Braxton	Town Hall (Trio & Quintet) 1972	Reissue of 1972 Trio LP
hat ART CD 6120	Eberhard Blum and Nils Vigeland	Morton Feldman: For Christian Wolff	
hat ART CD 6121	Gerry Hemingway Quartet	Down to the Wire	
hat ART CD 6122	Joëlle Léandre's Canvas Trio	L'Histoire De Mme. Tasco	
hat ART CD 6123	Franz Koglmann	Cantos I-IV	
hat ART CD 6124	Joëlle Léandre	Giacinto Scelsi: Okanagon	
hat ART CD 6125	Eberhard Blum	John Cage: Fontana Mix & Solo for Voice 2	
hat ART CD 6126	Paul Smoker Trio	Genuine Fables	
hat ART CD 6127	Steve Lacy 6	We See	
hat ART CD 6128	Anthony Braxton	Wesleyan (12 Altosolos) 1992	
hat ART CD 6129	Hildegard Kleeb and Roland Dahinden	John Cage: Prelude for Meditation	
hat ART CD 6130	Marianne Schroeder, Rohan de Saram, David Le Clair and Felix Renggli	Galina Ustvolskaya: 2	
hat ART CD 6131	Hildegard Kleeb and Dimitris Polisoidis	Mathias Spahlinger: Extension	
hat ART CD 6132	Eberhard Blum	Karlheinz Stockhausen: Spiral	
hat ART CD 6133	Eberhard Blum	Tom Johnson: Rational Melodies	
hat ART CD 6134	Frederic Rzewski	De Profundis	
hat ART CD 6135	Pannonisches Blasorchester	John Cage: Fifty-Eight	
hat ART CD 6136	Myra Melford Trio	Alive in the House of Saints	
hat ART CD 6137	Gerry Hemingway Quintet	Demon Chaser	
hat ART CD 6138	Dave Burrell	Windward Passages	Reissue of hat Hut FIVE (2R05)
hat ART CD 6139	Jimmy Lyons (saxophonist) & Sunny Murray Trio	Jump Up	Reissue of hat Hut TWENTYONE (2R21)
hat ART CD 6140	Steve Lacy-Roswell Rudd Quartet	School Days	Reissue of 1975 Emanem LP
hat ART CD 6141	Kristine Scholz, Mats Persson, Nils Vigeland and Steffen Schleiermacher	John Cage: Winter Music	
hat ART CD 6142	David Tudor	Karlheinz Stockhausen: Klavier_Stuecke	
hat ART CD 6143	Steffen Schleiermacher	The Bad Boys!: George Antheil, Henry Cowell, Leo Ornstein	
hat ART CD 6145	Rohan de Saram and Marianne Schroeder	Morton Feldman: Patterns in a Chromatic Field	
hat ART CD 6146	Eberhard Blum, Steffen Schleiermacher and Jan Williams	The New York School 2: Earle Brown, John Cage, Morton Feldman, Christian Wolff	
hat ART CD 6147	Eberhard Blum	Earle Brown: Four Systems	
hat ART CD 6148	Voxnova	Scelsi, Byzantium, The Alchemists	
hat ART CD 6149	Urs Leimgruber, Adelhard Roidinger and Fritz Hauser	Lines	
hat ART CD 6150	Anthony Braxton & George Lewis	Donaueschingen (Duo) 1976	
hat ART CD 6151	Hans Kennel	Mythahorns 2	
hat ART CD 6152	Mike Westbrook	Westbrook-Rossini, Zürich Live 1986	
hat ART CD 6153	Clusone 3	Soft Lights and Sweet Music	
hat ART CD 6154	Steve Lacy Five	The Way	Reissue of hat Hut THREE (2R03)
hat ART CD 6155	Ray Anderson, Han Bennink and Christy Doran	Azurety	
hat ART CD 6156	Hildegard Kleeb, Roland Dahinden and Dimitris Polisoidis	Christian Wolff: For Ruth Crawford	
hat ART CD 6157	Steffen Schleiermacher	Soviet Avant-Garde: Lourie / Mossolov / Protopopov / Roslavetz	
hat ART CD 6158	John Snijders, Josje ter Haar, Ruben Sanderse and Job ter Haar	Morton Feldman: Piano, Violin, Viola, Cello	
hat ART CD 6159	Ives Ensemble	John Cage: Ten / Ryoanji / Fourteen	
hat ART CD 6160	Anthony Braxton	Anthony Braxton's Charlie Parker Project 1993	
hat ART CD 6161	Myra Melford Extended Ensemble	Even the Sounds Shine	
hat ART CD 6162	Joe McPhee, Lisle Ellis and Paul Plimley	Sweet Freedom - Now What?	
hat ART CD 6163	Franz Koglmann & Lee Konitz	We Thought About Duke	
hat ART CD 6164	Gerry Hemingway Quintet	The Marmalade King	
hat ART CD 6165	Ray Anderson, Craig Harris, George Lewis and Gary Valente	Slideride	
hat ART CD 6166	Ib Hausmann and the Pellegrini Quartet	Morton Feldman: Clarinet and String Quartet	
hat ART CD 6167	Eberhard Blum, Roland Dahinden, Steffen Schleiermacher and Jan Williams	Christian Wolff: Exercises	
hat ART CD 6168	Radio-Sinfonie-Orchester Frankfurt	John Cage: Sixty-Eight / Quartets I-VIII	
hat ART CD 6169	Eberhard Blum, Marianne Schroeder, Robyn Schulkowsky, Frances-Marie Uitti	Ernstalbrecht Stiebler: Three in One	
hat ART CD 6170	Marianne Schroeder	Galina Ustvolskaya: 3	
hat ART CD 6171	Anthony Braxton	Creative Orchestra (Köln) 1978	
hat ART CD 6172	Steve Lacy & Mal Waldron	Live at Dreher Paris 1981: Round Midnight Vol. 1	Compilation of tracks from hat MUSICS 3501 – Snake Out, hat MUSICS 3515 – Herbe de L'Oubli, and hat ART 2038 – Let's Call This
hat ART CD 6173	Dave Douglas' Tiny Bell Trio	Constellations	
hat ART CD 6174	Lee Konitz, Don Friedman & Attila Zoller	Thingin'	
hat ART CD 6175	Ray Anderson, Han Bennink & Christy Doran	Cheer Up	
hat ART CD 6176	Eberhard Blum, Art Lange and Jan Williams	The New York School 3: Earle Brown, John Cage, Morton Feldman, Christian Wolff	
hat ART CD 6177	Ensemble Avantgarde Leipzig Conducted by Earle Brown	Earle Brown: Synergy	
hat ART CD 6178	Marcus Weiss	Conquest of Melody	
hat ART CD 6179	Percussion Ensemble Directed by Jan Williams	John Cage: Imaginary Landscapes	
hat ART CD 6180	Eberhard Blum	Alea: Roman Haubenstock-Ramati / Luis de Pablo / Tona Scherchen / Bernd Alois Zimmermann	
hat ART CD 6181	David Tudor	Piano Avant-Garde	
hat ART CD 6182	David Tudor, Frances Magnes, Bob Nagel, Al Cohn, Jack Maxin, Al Howard	Stefan Wolpe: Passacaglia - First Recordings 1954	
hat ART CD 6183	Guillermo Gregorio	Approximately	
hat ART CD 6185	Hans Kennel	Habarigani Brass	
hat ART CD 6186	Steve Lacy & Mal Waldron	Live at Dreher Paris 1981: The Peak Vol. 2	Compilation of tracks from hat MUSICS 3501 – Snake Out, hat MUSICS 3515 – Herbe de L'Oubli, and hat ART 2038 – Let's Call This
hat ART CD 6187	Catalogue	Pénétration	Reissue of hat ART 6187
hat ART CD 6188	Joe Maneri Quartet	Dahabenzapple	
hat ART CD 6189	Steve Lacy Two, Five & Six	Blinks	Reissue of hat ART 2006 with additional tracks
hat ART CD 6190	Anthony Braxton	Quartet (Santa Cruz) 1993	
hat ART CD 6191	Ensemble Recherche	Cornelius Schwehr: Poco a Poco Subito	
hat ART CD 6192	Ives Ensemble	John Cage: Two4 / Two6 / Five2 / Five5 / Seven / Seven2	
hat ART CD 6193	Tomas Bächli, Gertrud Schneider, Erika Radermacher and Manfred Werder	James Tenney: Bridge & Flocking	
hat ART CD 6194	Hildegard Kleeb	Anthony Braxton: Piano Music (Notated) 1968-1988	
hat ART CD 6195	Josje ter Haar, Job ter Haar and John Snijders	Morton Feldman: Trio	
hat ART CD 6196	Carol Morgan	Roman Haubenstock-Ramati: Pour Piano	
hat ART CD 6197	Joe McPhee & Survival Unit II	At WBAI's Free Music Store, 1971	
hat ART CD 6198	Jon Lloyd Quartet	By Confusion	
hat ART CD 6199	John Law	Extremely Quartet	
hat ART CD 6200	Matthew Shipp "String" Trio	By the Law of Music	

=== HatHut hatOLOGY discography: CDs ===
From 1997 hatOLOGY has been the main label for HatHut releases releasing new recordings and reissues, occasionally edited or expanded, of music from the early HatHut catalogue.

Catalog	Artist	Album	Notes
hatOLOGY 501	Joe Maneri Quartet	Coming Down the Mountain	
hatOLOGY 502	Ellery Eskelin with Andrea Parkins and Jim Black	One Great Day...	
hatOLOGY 503	Paul Dunmall, John Adams and Mark Sanders	Ghostly Thoughts	
hatOLOGY 504	Misha Mengelberg	The Root of the Problem	
hatOLOGY 505	Ran Blake & Anthony Braxton	A Memory of Vienna	
hatOLOGY 506	Matthew Shipp Duo with Joe Morris	Thesis	
hatOLOGY 507	Myra Melford & Han Bennink	Eleven Ghosts	
hatOLOGY 508	Jimmy Giuffre & André Jaume	Momentum, Willisau 1988	
hatOLOGY 509	Urs Leimgruber, Joëlle Léandre and Fritz Hauser	No Try No Fail	
hatOLOGY 510	Burkhard Beins, Martin Pfleiderer & Peter Niklas Wilson	Yarbles	
hatOLOGY 511	Guillermo Gregorio	Ellipsis	
hatOLOGY 512	Mat Maneri Quintet	Acceptance	
hatOLOGY 513	Carlos Zíngaro and Peggy Lee	Western Front, Vancouver 1996	
hatOLOGY 514	Joe McPhee	As Serious as Your Life	
hatOLOGY 515	Richard Grossman Trio	Even Your Ears	
hatOLOGY 516	Matthew Shipp Trio	The Multiplication Table	
hatOLOGY 517	Billy Bang & Denis Charles	Bangception, Willisau 1982	Reissue of hat MUSICS 3512 – Bangception
hatOLOGY 518	Lee Konitz & Martial Solal	Star Eyes, Hamburg 1983	
hatOLOGY 519	Lauren Newton	Filigree	Reissue of hat MUSICS 3511 – Timbre
hatOLOGY 520	Bernd Konrad Hans Koller Unit With Didier Lockwood	Phonolith	Reissue of hat MUSICS 3509 – Traumtänzer with additional recordings
hatOLOGY 521	Ellery Eskelin with Andrea Parkins & Jim Black	Kulak, 29 & 30	
hatOLOGY 522	Matthew Shipp Horn Quartet	Strata	
hatOLOGY 523	Clusone 3	Rara Avis	
hatOLOGY 524	Rajesh Mehta featuring Paul Lovens	Orka: Solos & Duos	
hatOLOGY 525	Joe Maneri Quartet	Tenderly	
hatOLOGY 526	Gregorio, Gustafsson, Nordeson	Background Music	
hatOLOGY 527	Ran Blake	Something to Live For	
hatOLOGY 528	ICP Orchestra	Jubilee Varia	
hatOLOGY 529	Mat Maneri Trio	So What?	
hatOLOGY 530	Matthew Shipp Duo with Mat Maneri	Gravitational Systems	
hatOLOGY 531	Guillermo Gregorio Trio	Red Cube(d)	
hatOLOGY 532	Steve Lacy Three	N.Y. Capers & Quirks	Partial reissue of hat Hut FOURTEEN (2R14) – Capers
hatOLOGY 533	Ellery Eskelin, Andrea Parkins and Jim Black	Five Other Pieces (+2)	
hatOLOGY 534	Ellery Eskelin & Han Bennink	Dissonant Characters	
hatOLOGY 535	Misha Mengelberg	Two Days in Chicago	
hatOLOGY 536	Steve Lacy Seven	Clichés	Partial reissue of hat ART 2001 – Prospectus
hatOLOGY 537	Jon Lloyd	Four and Five	
hatOLOGY 538	Sven-Åke Johansson	Six Little Pieces for Quintet	
hatOLOGY 539	Theo Jörgensmann Quartet	Snijbloemen	
hatOLOGY 540	Horace Tapscott	The Dark Tree 1 & 2	Reissue compilation of hat ART CD 6053 and hat ART CD 6083
hatOLOGY 541	Richard Grossman Trio	Where the Sky Ended	Reissue of Magnatone LP – Remember with additional tracks
hatOLOGY 542	Dave Douglas' Tiny Bell Trio	Constellations	Reissue of hat ART CD 6173
hatOLOGY 543	Franz Koglmann & Lee Konitz	We Thought About Duke	Reissue of HatART CD 6163
hatOLOGY 544	Joe McPhee	Tenor & Fallen Angels	Reissue of HAT C – Tenor with additional track
hatOLOGY 545	Anthony Braxton	Quintet (Basel) 1977	
hatOLOGY 546	Steve Lacy	Clinkers	Reissue of Hat Hut F
hatOLOGY 547	Lee Konitz, Don Friedman & Attila Zoller	Thingin'	Reissue of hat ART CD 6174
HatOLOGY 548	Simon Nabatov Trio	Sneak Preview	
hatOLOGY 549	Matthew Shipp Trio	Prism	Reissue of 1996 Brinkman LP – Prism
hatOLOGY 550	Ran Blake	Horace Is Blue: A Silver Noir	
hatOLOGY 551	Ellery Eskelin	Ramifications	
hatOLOGY 552	Ellery Eskelin, Andrea Parkins and Jim Black	The Secret Museum	
hatOLOGY 553	Theo Jörgensmann & Eckard Koltermann	Pagine Gialle	
hatOLOGY 554	Clusone 3	An Hour With...	
hatOLOGY 555	Anthony Ortega Trio	Scattered Clouds	
hatOLOGY 556	Steve Lacy Four	Morning Joy	Reissue of hat ART CD 6014
hatOLOGY 557	Anthony Braxton	Quartet (Dortmund) 1976	Reissue of hat ART CD 6075
hatOLOGY 558	Matthew Shipp String Trio	Expansion, Power, Release	
hatOLOGY 559	Sven-Åke Johansson, Axel Dörner and Andrea Neumann	Barcelona Series	
hatOLOGY 560	Vienna Art Orchestra	The Minimalism of Erik Satie	Reissue of hat ART 2005
hatOLOGY 561	Joe Maneri, Joe Morris and Mat Maneri	Out Right Now	
hatOLOGY 562	Cecil Taylor Unit	It Is in the Brewing Luminous	Reissue of hat Hut SIXTEEN (2R16)
hatOLOGY 563	Wallin & Johansson/Wallin, Janson & Wennerström	Proklamation I/Farewell to Sweden	
hatOLOGY 564	Paul Bley, Franz Koglmann and Gary Peacock	Annette	Reissue of hat ART CD 6118
hatOLOGY 565	Anthony Ortega	New Dance	Reissue of hat ART CD 6065
hatOLOGY 566	Franz Koglmann	O Moon My Pin-Up	
hatOLOGY 567	John Law Quartet	Abacus	
hatOLOGY 568	Sun Ra Arkestra	Sunrise in Different Dimensions	Reissue of hat Hut SEVENTEEN (2R17)
hatOLOGY 569	Steve Lacy 6	We See: Thelonious Monk Songbook	Reissue of hat ART CD 6127
hatOLOGY 570	Myra Melford Trio	Alive in the House of Saints	Reissue of hat ART CD 6136
hatOLOGY 571	Franz Koglmann	L'Heure Bleue	Reissue of hat ART CD 6093
hatOLOGY 572	Michel Portal, Léon Francioli and Pierre Favre	Arrivederci Le Chouartse	Reissue of hat Hut TWENTYTWO (2R22)
hatOLOGY 573	Albert Ayler	Lörrach, Paris 1966	Reissue of hat MUSICS 3500
hatOLOGY 574	Matthew Shipp String Trio	By the Law of Music	Reissue of hat ART CD 6200
hatOLOGY 575	Max Nagl Ensemble	Ramasuri	
hatOLOGY 576	Theo Jörgensmann Quartet	To Ornette - Hybrid Identity	
hatOLOGY 577	Ellery Eskelin	Vanishing Point	
hatOLOGY 578	Steve Lacy-Roswell Rudd Quartet	School Days	Reissue of 1975 Emanem LP
hatOLOGY 579	Joe McPhee Po Music	Oleo |Reissue of hat MUSICS 3514 with additional tracks	
hatOLOGY 580	John Zorn	Cobra	Reissue of hat ART 2034
hatOLOGY 581	Marc Copland Trio	Haunted Heart & Other Ballads	
hatOLOGY 582	François Raulin Trio	Trois Plans Sur la Comète	
hatOLOGY 583	Marc Copland – David Liebman Quartet	Lunar	
hatOLOGY 584	Ellery Eskelin, Andrea Parkins and Jim Black	12 (+1) Imaginary Views	
hatOLOGY 585	Nagl, Bernstein, Akchoté, Jones	Big Four	
hatOLOGY 586	Trapist: Brandlmayr, Siewert, Williamson	Highway My Friend	
hatOLOGY 587	David Liebman-Marc Copland Duo	Bookends	
hatOLOGY 588	Ellery Eskelin, Andrea Parkins and Jim Black	Arcanum Moderne	
hatOLOGY 589	Peter Brötzmann, Joe McPhee, Kent Kessler and Michael Zerang	Tales Out of Time	
hatOLOGY 590	Daniele D'Agaro, Ernst Glerum and Han Bennink	Strandjutters	
hatOLOGY 591	Pauline Oliveros	The Roots of the Moment	Reissue of hat ART CD 6009
hatOLOGY 592	Ellery Eskelin	Forms	Reissue of 1991 Open Mind CD
hatOLOGY 593	Marc Copland	Marc Copland And...	
hatOLOGY 594	Herbert Distel	Railnotes	Reissue compilation of hat ART CD 6001 – Die Reise and hat ART CD 6060 – La Stazione
hatOLOGY 595	Jimmy Giuffre, Paul Bley and Steve Swallow	Emphasis & Flight 1961	Reissue compilation of hat ART CD 6072 – Flight, Bremen 1961 and hat ART CD 6071 – Emphasis, Stuttgart 1961
hatOLOGY 596	Mal Waldron & Steve Lacy	Live at Dreher, Paris 1981	Reissue compilation of hat MUSICS 3501 – Snake Out, hat MUSICS 3515 – Herbe De L'Oubli, hat ART 2038 – Let's Call This with additional tracks
hatOLOGY 597	Myra Melford Extended Ensemble	Even the Sounds Shine	Reissue of hat ART CD 6161
hatOLOGY 598	Archie Shepp	I Know About the Life	Reissue of 1981 Sackville LP
hatOLOGY 599	Cecil Taylor Unit	One Too Many Salty Swift and Not Goodbye	Reissue of hat Hut TWO (3R02)
hatOLOGY 600	David Liebman	Colors	
hatOLOGY 601	Max Roach and Anthony Braxton	One in Two – Two in One	Reissue of hat Hut SIX (2R06)
hatOLOGY 602	Joe McPhee, Lisle Ellis and Paul Plimley	Sweet Freedom - Now What?	Reissue of hat ART CD 6162
hatOLOGY 603	Warne Marsh Quartet	Ne Plus Ultra	Reissue of 1970 Revelation LP with additional track
hatOLOGY 604	Steve Lacy Five	The Way	Reissue of hat Hut THREE (2R03) with additional tracks
hatOLOGY 605	Russ Lossing, Ed Schuller and Paul Motian	As It Grows	
hatOLOGY 606	Wolfgang Mitterer	Radio Fractal / Beat Music: Donaueschingen 2002	
hatOLOGY 607	<triox3>	New Jazz Meeting Baden-Baden 2002	
hatOLOGY 608	David Murray Trio	3D Family	Reissue of hat Hut HAT U/V
hatOLOGY 609	Max Nagl, Otto Lechner and Bradley Jones	Flamingos	
hatOLOGY 610	Anthony Braxton	Performance (Quartet) 1979	Reissue of hat Hut NINETEEN (2R19)
hatOLOGY 611	Ellery Eskelin	Ten	
hatOLOGY 612	Anthony Braxton	Anthony Braxton's Charlie Parker Project	Reissue of hat ART CD 6160
hatOLOGY 613	Daniele D'Agaro, Jeb Bishop, Kent Kessler and Robert Barry	Chicago Overtones	
hatOLOGY 614	Roland Dahinden, Hildegard Kleeb, Dimitris Polisoidis and Robert Höldrich	Anthony Braxton + Duke Ellington: Concept of Freedom	
hatOLOGY 615	David Liebman, Ellery Eskelin, Tony Marino and Jim Black	Different But the Same	
hatOLOGY 616	Theo Jörgensmann	Fellowship	
hatOLOGY 618	eRikm & Fennesz	Complementary Contrasts: Donaueschingen 2003	
hatOLOGY 619	Marc Copland	Time Within Time	
hatOLOGY 620	John Carter – Bobby Bradford Quartet	Seeking	Reissue of 1969 Revelation LP
hatOLOGY 621	Max Nagl Ensemble	Quartier du Faisan	
hatOLOGY 622	Cecil Taylor Unit	The Eighth	Reissue of hat ART 2036
hatOLOGY 623	efzeg	Krom	
hatOLOGY 624	Joe McPhee Survival Unit II with Clifford Thornton	N.Y. N.Y. 1971	Reissue of hat ART CD 6197 – At WBAI's Free Music Store, 1971
hatOLOGY 625	Steve Lacy and Brion Gysin	Songs	Reissue of hat ART 1985/86
hatOLOGY 626	Wiesendanger, Weber and Ulrich	We Concentrate	
hatOLOGY 627	Manuel Mengis Gruppe 6	Into the Barn	
hatOLOGY 628	David Liebman	The Distance Runner	
hatOLOGY 629	Russ Lossing	All Things Arise	
hatOLOGY 630	Horace Tapscott	The Dark Tree	Reissue of hat ART CD 6053 and hat ART CD 6083
hatOLOGY 631	Steve Lacy	New Jazz Meeting Baden-Baden 2002	Contains two tracks from hatOLOGY 607
hatOLOGY 632	Daniel Levin Quartet	Some Trees	
hatOLOGY 633	Polwechsel	Archives of the North	
hatOLOGY 634	Christian Weber, Hans Koch, Michael Moser, Martin Siewert and Christian Wolfarth	3 Suits & a Violin	
hatOLOGY 635	Mike Westbrook Orchestra	On Duke's Birthday	Reissue of hat ART 2012
hatOLOGY 636	Colin Vallon Trio	Ailleurs	
hatOLOGY 637	Nagl, Bernstein, Akchote, Jones	Big Four Live	
hatOLOGY 638	Georg Graewe, Ernst Reijseger and Gerry Hemingway	Sonic Fiction	Reissue of hat ART CD 6043
hatOLOGY 639	Oliver Lake Trio	Zaki	Reissue of hat ART CD 6113
hatOLOGY 640	Max Roach and Archie Shepp	The Long March	Reissue of hat Hut THIRTEEN (2R13)
hatOLOGY 641	Steve Lantner Trio	What You Can Throw	
hatOLOGY 642	David Liebman, Richie Beirach, Ron McClure and Billy Hart	Redemption	
hatOLOGY 643	Anthony Ortega	Afternoon in Paris	
hatOLOGY 644	Anthony Braxton	Creative Orchestra (Köln) 1978	Reissue of hat ART CD 6171
hatOLOGY 645	Fabian Gisler	Backyard Poets	
hatOLOGY 646	Theo Jörgensmann & Oles Brothers	Alchemia	
hatOLOGY 647	Jackson Harrison Trio	Land Tides	
hatOLOGY 648	Hans Kennel and Mytha	How It All Started	
hatOLOGY 649	Paul Bley	12 (+6) In a Row	Reissue of hat ART CD 6081
hatOLOGY 650	John Zorn, George Lewis and Bill Frisell	News for Lulu	Reissue of hat ART CD 6005
hatOLOGY 651	Russ Lossing and John Hebert	Line-Up	
hatOLOGY 652	Pandelis Karayorgis, Nate McBride and Curt Newton	Betwixt	
hatOLOGY 653	Daniel Levin Quartet	Blurry	
hatOLOGY 654	David Liebman, Ellery Eskelin, Tony Marino and Jim Black	Renewal	
hatOLOGY 655	John Zorn, George Lewis and Bill Frisell	More News for Lulu	Reissue of hat ART CD 6055
hatOLOGY 656	Matthew Shipp Trio	The Multiplication Table	Reiisue of hatOLOGY 516
hatOLOGY 657	Clusone 3	Soft Lights and Sweet Music	Reissue of hat ART CD 6153
hatOLOGY 658	Anthony Braxton	Seven Compositions (Trio) 1989	Reissue of hat ART CD 6125
hatOLOGY 659	Manuel Mengis Gruppe 6	The Pond	
hatOLOGY 660	Michael Adkins Quartet	Rotator	
hatOLOGY 661	Mike Westbrook	Westbrook-Rossini	Reissue of hat ART 2040
hatOLOGY 662	Mary Halvorson, Reuben Radding and Nate Wooley	Crackleknob	
hatOLOGY 663	Steve Lantner Quartet	Given: Live in Münster	
hatOLOGY 664	Anthony Braxton	Quartet (Dortmund) 1976	Reissue of hatOLOGY 557
hatOLOGY 665	Albert Ayler Quartet	Copenhagen Live 1964	
hatOLOGY 666	Dave Douglas' Tiny Bell Trio	Constellations	Reissue of hatOLOGY 542
hatOLOGY 667	ICP Orchestra	Jubilee Varia	Reissue of hatOLOGY 528
hatOLOGY 668	Lee Konitz and Martial Solal	Star Eyes, 1983	Reissue of hatOLOGY 518
hatOLOGY 669	Jimmy Lyons (saxophonist) & Sunny Murray Trio	Jump Up	Reissue of hat Hut TWENTYONE (2R21)
hatOLOGY 670	Joe Morris Bass Quartet	High Definition	
hatOLOGY 671	Vienna Art Orchestra	The Minimalism of Erik Satie	Reissue of hat ART 2005
hatOLOGY 672	Polwechsel & John Tilbury	Field	
hatOLOGY 673	Gerry Hemingway Quintet	Demon Chaser	Reissue of hat ART CD 6137
hatOLOGY 674	Paul Bley, Franz Koglmann and Gary Peacock	Annette	Reissue of hat ART CD 6118
hatOLOGY 675	Taylor Ho Bynum Sextet	Asphalt Flowers Forking Paths	
hatOLOGY 676	Anthony Braxton	Quintet (Basel) 1977	Reissue of hatOLOGY 545
hatOLOGY 677	Uwe Oberg, Christof Thewes and Michael Griener	Lacy Pool	
hatOLOGY 678	Albert Ayler Quartet	European Radio Studio Recordings 1964	
hatOLOGY 679	Vienna Art Orchestra	A Notion in Perpetual Motian	Reissue of hat ART 2024
hatOLOGY 680	Steve Lacy	Shots	Reissue of 1977 Musica LP
hatOLOGY 681	Russ Lossing Trio	Oracle	
hatOLOGY 682	Pandelis Karayorgis Quintet	System of 5	
hatOLOGY 683	Ellery Eskelin with Andrea Parkins and Jim Black	One Great Night...Live	
hatOLOGY 684	Manuel Mengis Gruppe 6	Dulcet Crush	
hatOLOGY 685	Anthony Braxton	Trio & Quintet (Town Hall) 1972	Reissue of 1972 Trio LP
hatOLOGY 686	Loren Connors & Jim O'Rourke	Are You Going To Stop... In Bern?	
hatOLOGY 687	Ran Blake & Anthony Braxton	A Memory of Vienna	Reissue of hatOLOGY 505
hatOLOGY 688	Noah Kaplan Quartet	Descendants	
hatOLOGY 689	Marc Copland-David Liebman Duo	Impressions	Partial reissue of hatOLOGY 587 – Bookends
hatOLOGY 690	Marc Copland Trio	Haunted Heart & Other Ballads	Reissue of hatOLOGY 581
hatOLOGY 691	Ellery Eskelin with Andrea Parkins & Jim Black	One Great Day...	Reissue of hatOLOGY 502
hatOLOGY 692	Lee Konitz, Don Friedman and Attila Zoller	Thingin'	Reissue of hat ART CD 6174
hatOLOGY 693	Bobby Bradford-John Carter Quintet	Comin' On	Reisssue of hat ART CD 6016
hatOLOGY 695	Ray Anderson, Han Bennink and Christy Doran	A B D	Compilation of tracks from hat ART CD 6155 – Azurety and hat ART CD 6175 – Cheer Up
hatOLOGY 696	Matthew Shipp	Duos with Mat Maneri & Joe Morris	Compilation of tracks from hatOLOGY 506 – Thesis and hatOLOGY 530 -Gravitational Systems
hatOLOGY 697	Steve Lacy Five	Blinks...Zürich Live 1983	Partial reissue of hat ART CD 6189
hatOLOGY 698	Sun Ra Arkestra	Sunrise in Different Dimensions	Reissue of hat Hut SEVENTEEN (2R17)
hatOLOGY 699	Ran Blake	That Certain Feeling (George Gershwin Songbook)	Reissue of hat ART CD 6077
hatOLOGY 701	Steve Lacy Four	Morning Joy ... Paris Live	Reissue of hat ART CD 6014
hatOLOGY 702	Christy Doran	In the Corner of the Eye	
hatOLOGY 703	Albert Ayler	Lörrach, Paris 1966	Reissue of hat MUSICS 3500
hatOLOGY 704	Joe McPhee	As Serious as Your Life	Reissue of hatOLOGY 514
hatOLOGY 705	Franz Koglmann	A White Line	Reissue of hatART CD 6048
hatOLOGY 706	Samuel Blaser Quartet	Boundless	
hatOLOGY 707	Myra Melford Trio	Alive in the House of Saints Part 1	Partial reissue of hat ART CD 6136
hatOLOGY 708	Myra Melford Trio	Alive in the House of Saints Part 2	Partial reissue of hat ART CD 6136
hatOLOGY 709	Marco von Orelli 6	Close Ties on Hidden Lanes	
hatOLOGY 710	David Liebman, Ellery Eskelin, Tony Marino and Jim Black	Non Sequiturs	
hatOLOGY 711	Ran Blake	Something to Live For	Reissue of hatOLOGY 527
hatOLOGY 712	Polwechsel	Traces of Wood	
hatOLOGY 713	Anthony Braxton	Quartet (Santa Cruz) 1993 1st Set	Partial reissue of hatART CD 6190
hatOLOGY 714	Anthony Braxton	Quartet (Santa Cruz) 1993 2nd Set	Partial reissue of hatART CD 6190
hatOLOGY 715	Anthony Braxton	Eight (+3) Tristano Compositions, 1989: For Warne Marsh	Reissue of hat ART CD 6052
hatOLOGY 716	Noah Kaplan Quartet	Cluster Swerve	
hatOLOGY 717	Albert Ayler	Stockholm, Berlin 1966	
hatOLOGY 718	Samuel Blaser Quartet	As the Sea	
hatOLOGY 719	Cecil Taylor	Garden 1st Set	Partial reissue of hat ART 1993/94
hatOLOGY 720	Cecil Taylor	Garden 2nd Set	Partial reissue of hat ART 1993/94
hatOLOGY 721	ROVA	Saxophone Diplomacy	Reissue of hatART CD 6068
hatOLOGY 722	Misha Mengelberg	Two Days in Chicago	Reissue of hatOLOGY 535
hatOLOGY 723	Jackson Harrisong Trio	Sintering	
hatOLOGY 724	Joe Morris	Mess Hall	
hatOLOGY 725	Michel Wintsch, Christian Weber and Christian Wolfarth	Willisau	
hatOLOGY 726	Marco von Orelli 5	Alluring Prospect	
hatOLOGY 727	Luzia Von Wyl Ensemble	Frost	
hatOLOGY 728	Christoph Erb, Jim Baker and Frank Rosaly	...Don't Buy Him a Parrot...	
hatOLOGY 729	Claudio Sanna	Ammentos	
hatOLOGY 730	Michel Wintsch	Roof Fool	
hatOLOGY 731	Ellery Eskelin	Solo Live At Snugs	
hatOLOGY 732	Marco Von Orelli, Max E. Keller and Sheldon Suter	Blow, Strike & Touch	
hatOLOGY 733	Peter Brötzmann, Joe McPhee, Kent Kessler and Michael Zerang	Tales Out of Time	Reissue of hatOLOGY 589
hatOLOGY 734	Herbert Distel	Travelogue	
hatOLOGY 735	Anthony Braxton	Quartet (Willisau) 1991 Studio	Partial reissue of hat ART CD 6100
hatOLOGY 739	Roland Dahinden and Hildegard Kleeb	Stones	
hatOLOGY 740	Uwe Oberg	Work	Recorded live at Jazzclub im Domizil, Saarbrücken, Germany on July 10, 2008
hatOLOGY 741	Ellery Eskelin Trio	Willisau Live	
hatOLOGY 742	Paula Shocron, Germán Lamonega and Pablo Díaz	Tensegridad	
hatOLOGY 743	Matthew Shipp	Invisible Touch at Taktlos Zürich	
hatOLOGY 745	Michael Adkins Quartet	Flaneur	
hatOLOGY 747	Samuel Blaser with Marc Ducret and Peter Bruun	Taktlos Zürich 2017	
hatOLOGY 748	Markus Eichenberger & Daniel Studer	Suspended	
hatOLOGY 749	Matthew Shipp	Symbol Systems	Reissue of 1995 No More CD
hatOLOGY 751	Silvan Schmid Quintet	At Gamut	
hatOLOGY 753	Luzia von Wyl Ensemble	Throwing Coins	

== See also ==
- List of record labels
