= Constellations (Dave Douglas album) =

Studio album by Dave Douglas
- Released: August 25, 1995
- Recorded: February 27–28, 1995
- Genre: Jazz
- Length: 58:55
- Label: Hat Hut
- Producer: Dave Douglas

Dave Douglas chronology
In Our Lifetime (1995)	Constellations (1995)	Five (1996)

Professional ratings
Review scores
Source	Rating
Allmusic	4/5 stars
The Penguin Guide to Jazz Recordings	4/4 stars

Constellations is the fourth album by trumpeter Dave Douglas and the second to feature his Tiny Bell Trio. It was released on the Swiss Hat Hut label in 1995 and features performances by Douglas, Brad Schoeppach and Jim Black.

== Reception ==
The Allmusic review by Alex Henderson states "Constellations isn't easy to absorb on the first listen; like a lot of avant-garde jazz, this is music that reveals more and more of its power with each listen".

== Track listing ==
All compositions by Dave Douglas except as indicated

1. "Constellations" - 7:07
2. "Unhooking the Safety Net" - 6:32
3. "Hope Ring True" - 9:09
4. "Taking Sides" - 6:10
5. "The Gig" (Herbie Nichols) - 5:29
6. "Scriabin" - 5:58
7. "Les Croquants" (Georges Brassens) - 2:47
8. "Maquiladora" - 11:08
9. "Vanitatus Vanitatum [Mit Humor]" (Robert Schumann) - 4:35
- Recorded in Zurich, Switzerland on February 27–28, 1995

== Personnel ==
- Dave Douglas – trumpet, producer
- Brad Schoeppach: guitar
- Jim Black – drums
- Bill Emmons – assistant engineer
- Isabelle Meister – photography
- Tony Reif – executive producer
- Jon Rosenberg – engineer
- David Thorne – design
