= The Eighth (album) =

Live album by Cecil Taylor
- Released: 1986
- Recorded: November 8, 1981
- Genre: Free jazz
- Label: Hat Hut

Cecil Taylor chronology
| Fly! Fly! Fly! Fly! Fly! (1980) | The Eighth (1986) | Garden (1981) |

Original LP Cover

2004 CD Reissue Cover

Professional ratings
Review scores
| Source | Rating |
|---|---|
| Allmusic | 4/5 stars |
| The Rolling Stone Jazz Record Guide | 3/5 stars |
| All About Jazz | 4/5 stars |

The Eighth is a live album by Cecil Taylor recorded at 2nd Freiburger Jazztage in Freiburg, Germany on November 8, 1981, and released on the Hat Hut label. The album features performances by Taylor with Jimmy Lyons, William Parker and Rashid Bakr. The album was originally released as an LP titled Calling it the Eighth in 1986 then rereleased as on CD featuring unedited performances in 1989 and remastered in 2004.

== Reception ==
The All About Jazz review by Chris May states "'Calling It The 8th' is a 59-minute double-fisted, elbows-on-the-keyboard, off-the-gauge hurricane of passion, counter-rhythm and chromaticism. Its ten-minute reprise, 'Calling It The 9th,' achieves the same level of overwhelming intensity. But if you can surrender yourself to the onslaught and stay the course, you'll emerge invigorated and uplifted, bloody but stronger. It's a prize worth fighting for". A reviewer for AllMusic commented: "Listened to casually (though it's hard to imagine this music listened to casually), one hears four virtuosi... playing maelstroms of dense music. Closer listening reveals symphonic ambition, mystical leanings, and the magic of numbers."

== Track listing ==
All compositions by Cecil Taylor.

1. "Calling It the 8th" - 58:10
2. "Calling It the 9th" - 10:50

- Recorded in Freiburg Germany on November 8, 1981

== Personnel ==
- Cecil Taylor: piano, vocals
- Jimmy Lyons: alto saxophone, vocals
- William Parker: bass, vocals
- Rashid Bakr: drums, vocals
