= Topology (album) =

Studio album by Joe McPhee Po Music
- Released: 1981
- Recorded: March 24 and 25, 1981, at Foundation Artists' House in Boswil, Switzerland
- Genre: Jazz
- Label: HatHut hat ART 1987/88
- Producer: Pia & Werner X. Uehlinger

Joe McPhee chronology
Tales and Prophecies (1981)	Topology (1981)	Oleo (1981)

Alternative Cover

Topology is an album by multi-instrumentalist and composer Joe McPhee, recorded in 1981 and first released on the Swiss HatHut label, it was rereleased on CD in 1990.

== Reception ==
Professional ratings
Review scores
Source	Rating
AllMusic	3/5 stars

AllMusic awarded the album 3 stars.

== Track listing ==
All compositions by Joe McPhee

1. "Age" – 10:47
2. "Blues for Chicago" – 5:34
3. "Pithecanthropus Erectus" (Charles Mingus) – 10:33
4. "Violets for Pia" – 7:43
5. "Topology I & II" (André Jaume, Joe McPhee) – 28:40

== Personnel ==
- Joe McPhee – tenor saxophone, pocket trumpet
- André Jaume – alto saxophone, bass clarinet (tracks 1 & 3–5)
- Irène Schweizer – piano
- Raymond Boni – guitar (tracks 1–3 & 5)
- François Mechali – bass
- Radu Malfatti – percussion, trombone, electronics (tracks 1, 3 & 5)
- Pierre Favre – percussion (track 5)
- Michael Overhage – cello (tracks 1, 2 & 5)
- Tamia – vocals (track 5)
