= Donaueschingen (Duo) 1976 =

Live album by Anthony Braxton and George Lewis
- Released: 1994
- Recorded: October 23, 1976
- Venues: The SWF-Jazz-Session, Donaueschingen, Germany
- Genre: Jazz
- Length: 44:46
- Label: hatART CD 6150

Anthony Braxton chronology
Time Zones (1976)	Donaueschingen (Duo) 1976 (1994)	Dortmund (Quartet) 1976 (1976)

Donaueschingen (Duo) 1976 is a live album by American composer and saxophonist Anthony Braxton and trombonist George E. Lewis recorded in Germany in 1976 but not released on the hatART label until 1994.

== Reception ==
Professional ratings
Review scores
Source	Rating
AllMusic	4.5/5 stars

The AllMusic review by Scott Yanow states, "A live set featuring duets by trombonist George Lewis and the reeds of Anthony Braxton might seem as if it would be a bit tedious, but the instant communication between the two keep the music continually fascinating. ...Listeners with open ears will enjoy this colorful set".

== Track listing ==
1. "Fred's Garden/Composition 6F: 73° Kelvin/Composition 64: PN-445-WNK/Duet 1" (Lewis/Braxton/Braxton/Lewis) - 41:20
2. "Donna Lee" (Charlie Parker) - 3:26

== Personnel ==
- Anthony Braxton - alto saxophone, sopranino saxophone, clarinet, contrabass clarinet, soprano clarinet, flutes, contrabass saxophone
- George Lewis - trombone
