= Clinkers (album) =

Live album by Steve Lacy
- Released: 1978
- Recorded: June, 1977
- Venue: Restaurant Zer alte Schmitti, Basel, Switzerland
- Genre: Jazz
- Length: 44:10
- Label: HatHut; HAT F
- Producer: Pia Uehlinger, Werner X. Uehlinger

Steve Lacy chronology
Follies (1978)	Clinkers (1978)	Stamps (1979)

Clinkers is a live solo album by soprano saxophonist Steve Lacy which was released on the HatHut label in 1978.

== Reception ==
Professional ratings
Review scores
Source	Rating
Allmusic	4.5/5 stars
The Penguin Guide to Jazz Recordings	3.5/4 stars
DownBeat	4/5 stars

The Allmusic review by Steve Loewy stated "If anyone ever wonders what the hoopla was in the 1970s about Steve Lacy's solo performances, he or she needs look no further than this album ... Lacy is perfectly splendorous, with solos that rival his best on disc. The saxophonist is alone and his playing is terrific, with each piece a mini-masterpiece. ... The perfect intonation, symmetrical melodies, and warped interpretations lead to altered expectations, as Lacy winds his way across terrain uniquely his own. One of the few instrumentalists who can sustain a solo performance for seemingly indefinite periods, the saxophonist's cool and restrained yet radical style is fully displayed without a moment's lapse". On All About Jazz, Robert Spencer wrote "Lacy's music always has a strong coherence and grasp of continuity. One thing follows from another, audibly so. It isn't any different with Clinkers. These tracks may take a little more time to come to grips with than the accessible trio music Lacy's been making lately, but it's well worth the effort: like all of this master's music, these tracks are emotionally rich and noble, full of possibilities noted and realized. Highly recommended".

== Track listing ==
All compositions by Steve Lacy

1. "Trickles" – 10:04
2. "Duck" – 7:02
3. "Coastline" – 7:56
4. "Microworlds" – 7:18
5. "Clinkers" – 11:58

== Personnel ==
- Steve Lacy – soprano saxophone
