= Dortmund (Quartet) 1976 =

Album by Anthony Braxton

Live album by Anthony Braxton
- Released: 1991
- Recorded: October 31, 1976
- Venues: "Jazz Life", Dortmund, Germany
- Genre: Jazz
- Length: 56:34
- Label: hatART
- Producer: Werner X. Uehlinger

Anthony Braxton chronology
| Donaueschingen (Duo) 1976 (1976) | Dortmund (Quartet) 1976 (1991) | The Montreux/Berlin Concerts (1975-76) |

Dortmund (Quartet) 1976 is a live album by American composer and saxophonist Anthony Braxton recorded in Germany in 1976 but not released on the hatART label until 1991. The album was subsequently reissued as Quartet (Dortmund) 1976 in 2001 and in 2019 (3rd edition).

== Reception ==
The Allmusic review by Steve Loewy awarded the album 5 stars stating "Braxton has produced many excellent recordings through the years, but only a small number stand out from the pack the way this one does... difficult but highly rewarding music".

Professional ratings
Review scores
| Source | Rating |
|---|---|
| Allmusic | 5/5 stars |
| The Penguin Guide to Jazz Recordings | 3/4 stars |

== Track listing ==
All compositions by Anthony Braxton.

1. "Composition 40 F/Composition 23 J" - 26:10
2. "Composition 40 (O)" - 6:40
3. "Composition 6 C" - 9:47
4. "Composition 40 B" - 13:57
- Recorded at Jazzlife in Dortmund, Germany on October 31, 1976

== Personnel ==
- Anthony Braxton - sopranino saxophone, alto saxophone, contrabass saxophone, clarinet, E-flat clarinet, contrabass clarinet
- George Lewis - trombone
- Dave Holland - bass
- Barry Altschul - drums, percussion
