= Right Time, Right Place =

Studio album by Gary Burton & Paul Bley
- Released: 1990
- Recorded: March 29, 1990
- Studio: Studio 3, Denmark's Radio, Copenhagen
- Genre: Jazz fusion
- Length: 1:07:52
- Label: GNP Crescendo
- Producer: Ib Skovgaard

Gary Burton chronology
Reunion (1989)	Right Time, Right Place (1990)	Cool Nights (1991)

Paul Bley chronology
12 (+6) In a Row (1990)	Right Time, Right Place (1990)	Changing Hands (1991)

Professional ratings
Review scores
Source	Rating
AllMusic	3/5 stars
Q	4/5 stars

Right Time, Right Place is a duo album by American jazz vibraphonist Gary Burton and Canadian pianist Paul Bley. The album was recorded in Denmark and released in 1990 via GNP Crescendo label.

== Background ==
The album contains recordings performed by the two musicians in the studio of the Danish broadcaster on 29 March 1990. Burton and Bley were in Denmark at the request of the Danish Jazz Center. Each played there with his own ensemble, but for this album they played only as a duo. The binding factor for Burton and Bley is jazz composer Carla Bley. Burton played her pieces relatively often, and Paul Bley was her husband. The album contains solo pieces for vibraphone (tracks 3 & 11) and piano (tracks 6,7 & 8); the other recordings are duets.

== Reception ==
Scott Yanow of AllMusic stated: "On their six duets, Burton and Bley do not take turns soloing per se as much as alternate being the lead voice. Their unaccompanied features (three apiece) are generally in the same introspective but exploratory mood, making this a quiet program of thought-provoking if occasionally sleepy music." Brian Glasser in Q Magazine called it "a pleasing mix of well and lesser-known material."

== Track listing ==
No.	Title	Writer(s)	Length
1.	"Ida Lupino"	Carla Bley	9:10
2.	"Isn't It Romantic?"	Lorenz Hart, Richard Rodgers	6:01
3.	"Laura's Dream"	Astor Piazzolla	6:58
4.	"Carla"	Paul Bley	5:14
5.	"Olhos de Gato"	Carla Bley	9:20
6.	"Alcazar"	Paul Bley	3:33
7.	"Rightly So"	Paul Bley	3:31
8.	"Nothing to Declare"	Paul Bley	3:16
9.	"You Don't Know What Love Is"	Gene DePaul, Don Raye	8:47
10.	"Eidertown"	Steve Swallow	5:29
11.	"Turn Out the Stars"	Bill Evans	6:33
Total length:			1:07:52

== Personnel ==
Band

- Paul Bley – piano
- Gary Burton – vibraphone

Production

- Lars Palsig – engineer
- Jan Persson – photography
- Ib Skovgaard – producer

== External links and sources ==
- Official website
