= Seven Compositions 1978 =

Studio album by Anthony Braxton
- Released: 1980
- Recorded: November 1979
- Studio: P.A.L.M. Studio, Paris
- Genre: Jazz
- Length: 39:39
- Label: Moers Music momu 01066
- Producer: Burkhard Hennen

Anthony Braxton chronology
| Anthony Braxton / Robert Schumann String Quartet (1979) | Seven Compositions 1978 (1980) | Composition No. 94 for Three Instrumentalists (1980) (1980) |

Seven Compositions 1978 is an album by composer Anthony Braxton recorded in Paris in 1979 by a quartet and originally released on the Moers Music label.

== Reception ==
Professional ratings
Review scores
| Source | Rating |
|---|---|
| Allmusic | 3/5 stars |
| The Rolling Stone Jazz Record Guide | 4/5 stars |

The Allmusic review by Brian Olewnick stated: "Seven Compositions (1978) is, overall, a fine documentation of one of Braxton's less heralded bands and a fine compendium of works in its own right, providing a good portrait of the state of his musical concerns at the time."

== Track listing ==
All compositions by Anthony Braxton are graphically titled and the following attempts to translate the title to text.

1. "2643 K-8--W-B [Composition 69 G]" - 7:25
2. "W6 4N R6 AH0 [Composition 40 F]" - 9:55
3. "36 SB7 M-36 [Composition 69 M]" - 3:14
4. "ANNF (GM-6)--30 [Composition 40 D]" - 5:28
5. "F04(G)WN OQO-26-- [Composition 40 I]" - 3:57
6. "---(W6 N6) - K8-4 [Composition 69 H]" - 7:35
7. "---GM2 (OSM-40) - GRK [Composition 69 K]" - 2:05

== Personnel ==
- Anthony Braxton - alto saxophone, soprano saxophone, E♭ soprano saxophone, contrabass clarinet, soprano clarinet, clarinet
- Ray Anderson - trombone, alto trombone, cornet
- John Lindberg - bass
- Thurman Barker - drums, marimba, bells
