= Daybreak (Dave Burrell and David Murray album) =

Studio album by Dave Burrell and David Murray
- Released: 1989
- Recorded: 1989
- Genre: Post-bop; Free jazz Avant-garde jazz Bop
- Length: 44:15
- Label: Gazell
- Producer: Samuel Charters

Dave Burrell chronology
| Windward Passages (1979) | Daybreak (1989) | In Concert (1991) |

Daybreak is a studio album by jazz pianist Dave Burrell in duet with long-time collaborator David Murray on reed instruments. It was recorded in 1989 and released that same year by Gazell Records.

== Track listing ==
1. "Daybreak" (Burrell) — 12:03
2. "Sketch #1" (Murray) — 9:54
3. "Blue Hour" (Burrell) — 13:45
4. "Qasbah Rendezvous" (Burrell) — 8:21

== Personnel ==
- Dave Burrell — piano
- David Murray — clarinet (bass), saxophone (tenor)

Production:

- Glenn Barratt — engineer
- Samuel Charters — producer, liner notes, photography

== Reception ==
Professional ratings
Review scores
| Source | Rating |
|---|---|
| Allmusic | 2.5/5 stars |
| The Penguin Guide to Jazz Recordings | 3/4 stars |

Allmusic says that Burrell and Murray are "overtly experimental ... that doesn't play to the strengths of these musicians." Reviewer Brian Olewnick suggests listeners hear the quartet the two were a part of with Fred Hopkins and Andrew Cyrille around the same time this album was released in order to "better hear their capabilities."
