= Songs (Steve Lacy and Brion Gysin album) =

Studio album by Steve Lacy and Brion Gysin
- Released: 1981
- Recorded: January 28–29, 1981 in Paris
- Genre: Jazz
- Length: 63:42 CD reissue with additional track
- Label: hat ART hat ART 1985/86
- Producer: Pia Uehlinger, Werner X. Uehlinger

Steve Lacy chronology
Capers (1980)	Songs (1981)	Ballets (1981)

Songs is an album by soprano saxophonist Steve Lacy and poet Brion Gysin, recorded in Paris in 1981 and first released on the hat ART label as a double LP. The album was rereleased on CD in 1990 with an additional track.

== Reception ==
Professional ratings
Review scores
Source	Rating
All About Jazz	4/5 stars
AllMusic	3/5 stars

All About Jazz said, "Lacy and Gysin had worked together as far back as '69, and their rapport is evident here".

== Track listing ==
All compositions by Steve Lacy except where noted

1. "Gay Paree Bop" – 9:25
2. "Nowhere Street" – 11:45
3. "Somebody Special" – 9:15
4. "Luvzya" (Oliver Johnson) – 7:00
5. "Keep the Chance" – 7:00
6. "Permutations: Junk Is No Good Baby" – 1:45
7. "Permutations: Kick That Habit Man" – 0:45
8. "Permutations: I Don't Work You Dig" – 1:40
9. "Blue Baboon" – 4:55
10. "Nowhere Street 1" [Incomplete] – 9:18 Additional track on CD reissue

== Personnel ==
- Steve Lacy – soprano saxophone, voice
- Brion Gysin – lyrics, voice (tracks 4 & 6-8)
- Steve Potts – alto saxophone, soprano saxophone
- Bobby Few – piano
- Irene Aebi – violin, voice
- Jean-Jacques Avenel – bass
- Oliver Johnson – drums
