= 3D Family =

Live album by David Murray
- Released: 1980
- Recorded: September 3, 1978
- Genre: Jazz
- Length: 70:00
- Label: Hat Hut
- Producer: Kazunori Sugiyama

David Murray chronology
| The London Concert (1979) | 3D Family (1980) | Sweet Lovely (1980) |

3D Family is an album by David Murray, released on the Swiss Hat Hut label. It was released in 1980 as a double LP and features a live performance by Murray, Johnny Mbizo Dyani and Andrew Cyrille recorded September 3, 1978, at the Jazzfestival Willisau.

== Reception ==
The AllMusic review by Brian Olewnick stated, "If anything, the length of the pieces allows Murray to drift on a bit longer than necessary at times. As often as not, though, he manages to wring out some extra juice, making it easy for the listener to grant him significant slack. Still in his mid-twenties, this recording captures him moving toward the crest of his powers (evidenced in his octets) and is one of the better trio dates in his discography. Recommended, as much for the marvelous 'sidemen' as for Murray himself".

Professional ratings
Review scores
| Source | Rating |
|---|---|
| AllMusic | 4/5 stars |
| The Rolling Stone Jazz Record Guide | 3/5 stars |

== Track listing ==
All tracks are written by David Murray.

| No. | Title | Length |
|---|---|---|
| 1. | "In Memory of Jomo Kenyatta" | 9:20 |
| 2. | "Patricia" | 17:33 |
| 3. | "3D Family (for Walter P. Murray)" | 18:27 |
| 4. | "Shout Song (for Cecil Taylor)" | 23:45 |
| 5. | "P.O. In Cairo" (omitted from CD rerelease) | 17:00 |

  - September 3, 1978, at the Jazzfestival Willisau

== Personnel ==
- David Murray – tenor saxophone
- Johnny Mbizo Dyani – bass
- Andrew Cyrille – percussion
