= Willisau (Quartet) 1991 =

Studio album / Live album by Anthony Braxton
- Released: 1992
- Recorded: June 2, 4–5, 1991
- Genre: Jazz
- Length: 259:03
- Label: hatART
- Producers: Pia Uehlinger, Werner X. Uehlinger

Anthony Braxton chronology
| Duets: Hamburg 1991 (1991) | Willisau (Quartet) 1991 (1992) | Duo (Amsterdam) 1991 (1991) |

Willisau (Quartet) 1991 is a 4CD box set by American composer and saxophonist Anthony Braxton recorded live and in the studio in 1991 and released on the hatART label.

== Reception ==
The Allmusic review by Thom Jurek awarded the album 4½ stars stating "With this band, he never had to assert himself as a leader because they could instinctively follow his cues. Since that time, he has had to assert himself more and more. And while the music he's writing has every bit of the wonder, awe, and irritation of his earlier work, it has never been played with this virtuosity". The Penguin Guide to Jazz Recordings review gave it four stars and said "There is considerably more than four hours of music on the set, much of it reaching as high as anything Braxton has done... Fascinating stuff, and beautifully played."

Professional ratings
Review scores
| Source | Rating |
|---|---|
| Allmusic | 4.5/5 stars |
| The Penguin Guide to Jazz Recordings | 4/4 stars |

== Track listing ==
All compositions by Anthony Braxton

Disc One:

1. "No. 160(+5) +40j" – 13:22
2. "No. 23 M (+10)" – 16:02
3. "No. 158 (+96) +40l" – 17:28
4. "No. 40a" – 13:29
5. "No. 40b" – 11:34

Disc Two:

1. "No. 161" – 17:22
2. "No. 159" – 17:04
3. "No. 23c +32 +105b (+30)" – 9:10
4. "No. 23 M (+10)" – 13:46
5. "No. 40m" – 12:03

Disc Three:

1. "No. 67 (+147+96)" – 15:03
2. "No. 140 (+147 +139 + 135)" – 17:04
3. "No. 34a" – 8:24
4. "No. 20+86" – 12:13
5. "No. 23g (+147+30)" – 5:55

Disc Four:

1. "No. 69 (0) + 135" – 12:47
2. "No. 69b" – 23:48
3. "No. 107b (+96)" – 10:27
4. "No. 101" – 12:02

- Recorded at Mohren in Willisau, Switzerland on June 2 (Disc Three and Four) and June 4 & 5 (Disc One and Two), 1991

== Personnel ==
- Anthony Braxton – sopranino saxophone, alto saxophone, clarinet, flute
- Marilyn Crispell – piano
- Mark Dresser – bass
- Gerry Hemingway – drums, marimba
