= Quartet (Santa Cruz) 1993 =

Live album by Anthony Braxton
- Released: 1997
- Recorded: July 19, 1993
- Venues: Kuumbwa Jazz Center, Santa Cruz, CA
- Genre: Jazz
- Length: 145:06
- Label: hatART CD 2-6190
- Producer: Larry Blood

Anthony Braxton chronology
Twelve Compositions (1993)	Quartet (Santa Cruz) 1993 (1997)	Anthony Braxton's Charlie Parker Project 1993 (1993)

Quartet (Santa Cruz) 1993 is a double CD by American composer and saxophonist Anthony Braxton recorded live in 1993 and released on the hatART label in 1997.

== Reception ==
Professional ratings
Review scores
Source	Rating
AllMusic	4.5/5 stars

The AllMusic review by Thom Jurek states: "This double CD documents with a finality just what the quartet had achieved in its eight years together. Braxton had realized within this group of musicians a goal he had previously thought unattainable: the ability to interchange any composition from any of his periods with any other -- and within each other -- in a small group setting. And given the far-reaching musical tenets each of these 'sets of compositions' notated by tracks are, that is no mean feat". The JazzTimes review by John Murph enthused, "this exhausting yet fascinating two-disc adventure transports the listener to a cubist realm of terse tonal manipulations, extreme volume dynamics, and controlled collective chaos".

== Track listing ==
All compositions by Anthony Braxton.

Disc one

1. "Comp. 159 + (30 + 108a) / Comp. 40(o) / Comp. 69f / Comp. 173 / Comp. 69(o) / Comp. 52" - 76:06

Disc two

1. "Comp. 172 / Comp. 161 / Comp. 69m / Comp. 23c / Comp. 124 + (108c + 147)" - 69:00

== Personnel ==
- Anthony Braxton - reeds
- Marilyn Crispell - piano
- Mark Dresser - bass
- Gerry Hemingway - drums, percussion, vibraphone, marimba
