= Léon Francioli =

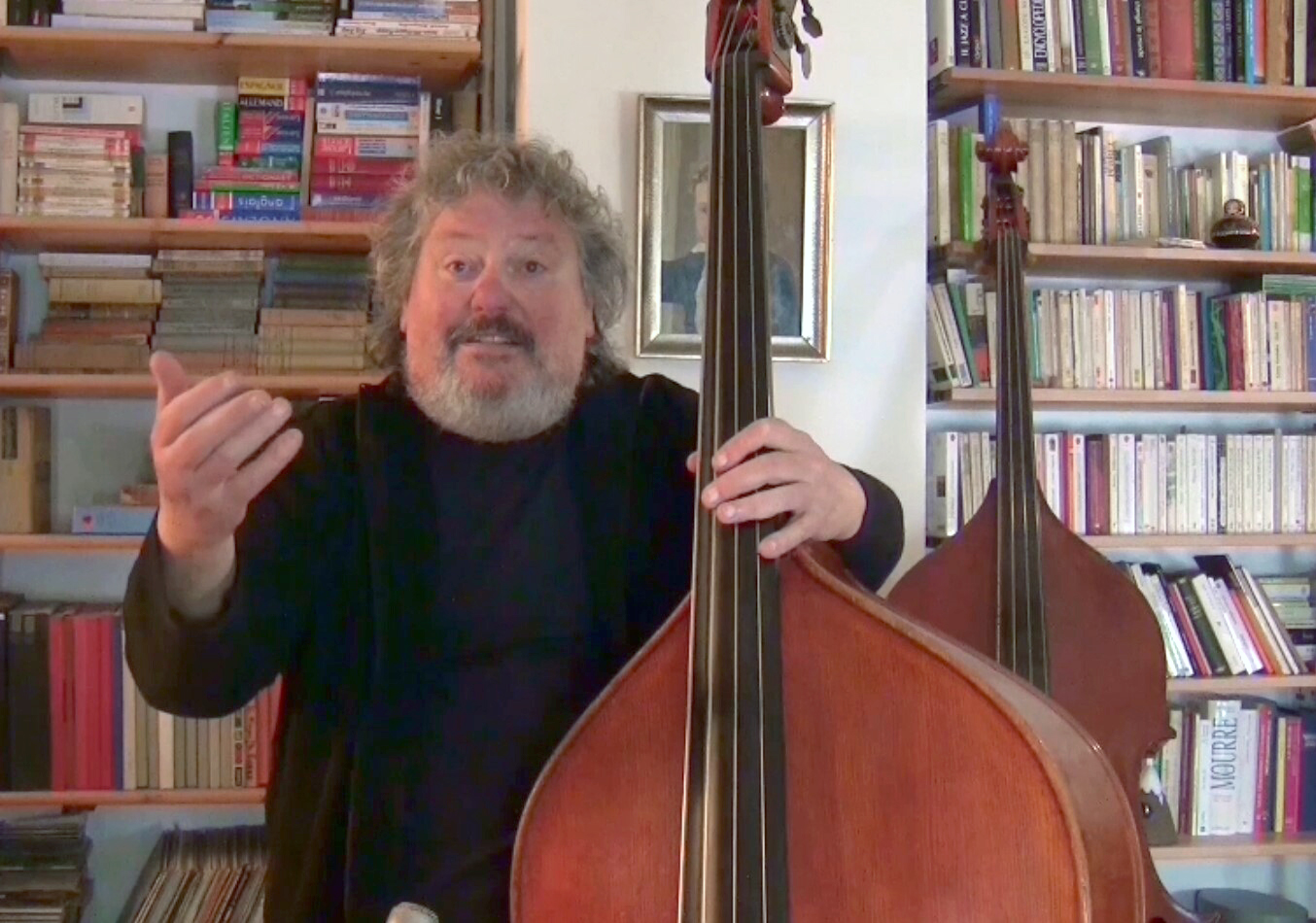
- Léon Francioli in 2016

Background information
- Born: 22 May 1946 (age 80); Lausanne, Switzerland
- Genres: Creative Jazz
- Occupation: Musician
- Instruments: Double bass, bass guitar

Léon Francioli (22 May 1946 – 9 March 2016) was a Swiss double bass player and cellist.

== Life and career ==
Born in Lausanne, Switzerland, Léon Francioli studied piano and double bass at the Lausanne Conservatory. He became famous in Switzerland as a Jazz player, after he started to work with Beb Guérin, Pierre Favre, Bernard Vitet and George Gruntz in the 1970s. In 1972 he performed with these musicians and with Michel Portal at the Festival de Châteauvallon. In 1970 he recorded with Alan Skidmore and Pierre Cullaz. In 1976 he toured and recorded as a duo with Favre. In 1979, he played for the soundtrack of les petites figures. That same year he performed at the Jazz Festival Willisau in a trio with drummer Jerry Chardonnens and trombonist Radu Malfatti.

In 1981, Francioli established the group Sunnymoon together with Werner Lüdi, Stephan Wittwer and Fredy Studer. He also played in 1980 in the albums of Favre, Michel Portal and Jerry Chardonnens for Hathut Records. He played also in Trio with the trombonist Albert Mangelsdorff (Triple Entente, 1982) along with Jean-François Bovard. He founded in 1984 the Francioli-Bovard Orchestra and played in the Sextet of the pianist François Lindemann. In 1985 he became a member of the trio of the pianist Alex Theus. At the beginning of 90s, Francioli worked with Joe McPhee (Linear B) and Mario Schiano (And So On). In 2007, he appeared along with Alex Theus and Daniel Bourquin in the Schaffhausen Jazz Festival.
