= Rotation (Joe McPhee album) =

Live album by Joe McPhee
- Released: 1977
- Recorded: September 3, 1976, in Basel, Switzerland
- Genre: Jazz
- Length: 47:25
- Label: HatHut hat HUT D
- Producer: Craig Johnson and Pia & Werner X. Uehlinger

Joe McPhee chronology
Tenor (1976)	Rotation (1977)	Graphics (1977)

Rotation is a live album by multi-instrumentalist and composer Joe McPhee, recorded in 1976 in Switzerland and first issued on the Swiss HatHut label.

== Reception ==
Professional ratings
Review scores
Source	Rating
Allmusic	3/5 stars

Allmusic gave the album 3 stars.

== Track listing ==
All compositions by Joe McPhee

1. "Sweet Dragon" - 6:55
2. "Theme from Episode #3" - 5:20
3. "Bahamian Folksong" - 10:55
4. "Spaces" - 9:25
5. "Rotation" - 6:35
6. "Episode #2" - 8:15

== Personnel ==
- Joe McPhee - tenor saxophone, soprano saxophone, trumpet, cornet, cowbell
- John Snyder - synthesizer (tracks 3–6)
- Marc Levin - trumpet, flugelhorn, mellophone (track 6)
