= Thingin' =

Live album by Lee Konitz, Don Friedman and Attila Zoller
- Released: 1996
- Recorded: March 30, 1995
- Venue: Singsaal Feld/Sekundarschule Thalwil
- Genre: Jazz
- Length: 65:07
- Labels: HatART; CD 6174
- Producers: Pia Uehlinger, Werner X. Uehlinger

Lee Konitz chronology
Breaths and Whispers (1995)	Thingin' (1996)	The Frankfurt Concert (1995)

Don Friedman chronology
The Days of Wine and Roses (1996)	Thingin' (1996)	Red Sky Waltz (1996)

Attila Zoller chronology
When It's Time (1994)	Thingin' (1996)	Lasting Love (1997)

Thingin' is a live album by saxophonist Lee Konitz, pianist Don Friedman and guitarist Attila Zoller which was recorded in Switzerland in 1995 and released on the Swiss HatART label.

== Reception ==
Professional ratings
Review scores
Source	Rating
AllMusic	3/5 stars
The Penguin Guide to Jazz Recordings	3/4 stars

The AllMusic review by Steve Loewy states: "If the session does not totally stand out from the wealth of others the saxophonist has led it is only because of the plethora of high quality disks Konitz has produced during his career. In every way, this one is a worthy contribution to his discography, with the characteristic beautiful and mellow tone, laid-back style, and advanced harmonics". In JazzTimes, Harvey Pekar wrote "Konitz, Zoller and Friedman play as one here. Indeed, they do seem to share similar musical backgrounds and values ... It’s a pleasure to hear them work. Not only have they all been around for a while, they’ve learned a lot. Their playing is almost cliche-free, and their contrapuntal work hangs together quite well".

== Track listing ==
1. "Thingin'" (Lee Konitz) – 11:54
2. "Joy for Joy" (Attila Zoller) – 12:07
3. "Opus d'Amour" (Don Friedman) – 8:52
4. "Cloisterbells" (Zoller) – 3:38
5. "Images" (Friedman) – 4:22
6. "Alone Together" (Arthur Schwartz, Howard Dietz) – 10:24
7. "Suite for 3" (Friedman) – 13:49

== Personnel ==
- Lee Konitz – alto saxophone (tracks 1–3, 6–7)
- Don Friedman – piano (tracks 1–3 & 5–7)
- Attila Zoller – guitar (tracks 1–4, 6–7)
