= Anthony Braxton / Robert Schumann String Quartet =

1986 live album

Live album by Anthony Braxton / Robert Schumann String Quartet
- Released: 1986
- Recorded: November 10, 1979; Köln, West Germany
- Genre: Jazz, contemporary classical music
- Length: 50:35
- Label: Sound Aspects sas 009
- Producer: Leo Feigin

Anthony Braxton chronology
Performance (Quartet) 1979 (1979)	Anthony Braxton / Robert Schumann String Quartet (1986)	Seven Compositions 1978 (1979)

Anthony Braxton / Robert Schumann String Quartet is an album by composer/saxophonist Anthony Braxton in concert with the Robert Schumann String Quartet recorded in 1979 by Westdeutscher Rundfunk and originally released on the Sound Aspects label in 1986.

== Reception ==
Professional ratings
Review scores
Source	Rating
AllMusic	2/5 stars

The AllMusic review by Brian Olewnick stated: "For jazz fans, this certainly ranks as one of the more difficult releases from Braxton ... Fans of his classical side will want this release for the string quartet while aficionados of his solo work will greatly enjoy those herein. Relatively rare will be the listener who gets equal enjoyment from both."

== Track listing ==
All compositions by Anthony Braxton are graphically titled and the following attempts to translate the title to text.

1. "8KN-(B-12) | R10 [Composition 17]" - 16:57
2. "AOTH MBA H [Composition 26 E]" - 3:38
3. "(448-R) | C-234 [Composition 26 I]" - 3:07
4. "8KN-(B-12) | R10 [Composition 17]" - 14:20
5. "KSZMK PQ EGN [Composition 77 D]" - 2:55
6. "SOVA NOUB V-(AO) [Composition 77 E]" - 2:56
7. "RORRT 33H7T 4 [Composition 77 B]" - 2:44
8. "NATK TD-(B) [Composition 26 B]" - 3:58

== Personnel ==
- Anthony Braxton - alto saxophone (tracks 1–3 & 5–8)
- Robert Schumann Quartet: (tracks 1 & 4)
  - Michael Gaiser, Chiharu Yuuki - violin
  - Jürgen Weber - viola
  - Wolfgang Mehlhorn - cello
