= Variations on a Blue Line =

Live album by Joe McPhee
- Released: 1979
- Recorded: October 11, 1977
- Venue: Salle Ste Croix des Pelletiers, Rouen, France
- Genre: Jazz
- Length: 36:23
- Label: HatHut hat HUT O
- Producer: Craig Johnson, Pia Uehlinger, Werner X. Uehlinger

Joe McPhee chronology
Graphics (1977)	Variations on a Blue Line (1979)	Glasses (1977)

Variations on a Blue Line (subtitled 'Round Midnight) is a live album by multi-instrumentalist and composer Joe McPhee, recorded in France in 1977 and first released on the Swiss HatHut label in 1979.

== Reception ==
Professional ratings
Review scores
Source	Rating
Allmusic	4.5/5 stars

Allmusic gave the album 4½ stars.

== Track listing ==
All compositions by Joe McPhee except as indicated

1. "Beanstalk" - 17:06
2. "Motian Studies" - 7:39
3. "Variations on a Blue Line (After a Theme for Knox)" - 6:33
4. "'Round Midnight" (Thelonious Monk) - 5:05

== Personnel ==
- Joe McPhee - tenor saxophone, soprano saxophone
