= The Way (Steve Lacy album) =

Live album by Steve Lacy
- Released: 1980
- Recorded: January 23, 1979
- Venue: Stadttheater Basel, Switzerland
- Genre: Jazz
- Length: 115:28 CD reissue with additional tracks
- Label: HatHut hat Hut THREE (2R3)
- Producer: Werner X. Uehlinger

Steve Lacy chronology
High, Low and Order (1979)	The Way (1980)	Eronel (1980)

The Way is a live album by soprano saxophonist Steve Lacy, which was recorded in Basel, Switzerland in 1979 and first released on the HatHut label in 1980 as a double LP. The album was rereleased as a double LP in 1985 and as a CD in 2000 with three additional tracks from the concert.

== Reception ==
Professional ratings
Review scores
Source	Rating
Allmusic	4/5 stars
The Penguin Guide to Jazz Recordings	3.5/4 stars

The Allmusic review by Scott Yanow stated "the many strong solos by Lacy and the highly underrated altoist Potts makes this two-fer of interest for followers of advanced jazz. This was always a well-organized and highly original group". On All About Jazz Francis Lo Kee said "The great Steve Lacy, recently departed, made many records, but this one captures a great ensemble at the peak of its creative powers ... it's hard to believe that so much great music was played in one sitting". Clifford Allen observed "The playful, off-kilter melodies that Lacy has a penchant for, deceptively simple repetitions of phrase and eloquent austerity, belie a Buddhist wit, and the way in which Lacy plays with composition and improvisation as though they were riddles for one another fits right into the jazz musician's koan".

== Track listing ==
All compositions by Steve Lacy except where noted

1. "Stamps" – 5:46 Additional track on CD reissue
2. "Blinks" – 10:45 Additional track on CD reissue
3. "Troubles" – 9:59 Additional track on CD reissue
4. "Raps" – 11:31
5. "Dreams" (Steve Lacy, Brion Gysin) – 9:17
6. "Existence" – 8:40
7. "The Way" – 9:56
8. "Bone" – 7:45
9. "Name" – 12:57
10. "The Breath" – 12:00
11. "Life On Its Way" – 11:05
12. "Swiss Duck" – 5:53

== Personnel ==
- Steve Lacy – soprano saxophone, voice
- Steve Potts – alto saxophone, soprano saxophone
- Irene Aebi – cello, violin, voice
- Kent Carter – bass
- Oliver Johnson – drums
