= Pieces of Light =

Studio album by Joe McPhee and John Snyder
- Released: 1974
- Recorded: April 1974 at CjR Studio in West Park, NYC
- Genre: Jazz
- Length: 46:47
- Label: CjR CjR 4 Atavistic ALP256CD

Joe McPhee chronology
Trinity (1972)	Pieces of Light (1974)	The Willisau Concert (1976)

Pieces of Light is the first studio album by multi-instrumentalist and composer Joe McPhee (with John Snyder on synthesizers) recorded in 1974 and originally released on the CjR label, then reissued by Atavistic in 2005.

== Reception ==
Professional ratings
Review scores
Source	Rating
Allmusic	2.5/5 stars
The Penguin Guide to Jazz Recordings	3/4 stars

The Allmusic review by Thom Jurek stated "The result is a meandering six-part meditation on how best to combine acoustically and electrically driven sounds... most of Pieces of Light is merely a curiosity". On All About Jazz writer Kurt Gottschalk noted "McPhee at times plays marvelously jazzy in alien vistas and if Snyder's synthesizer sounds a bit dated at times it never comes off as quaint".

== Track listing ==
All compositions by Joe McPhee and John Snyder

1. "Prologue/Twelve" - 9:13
2. "Shadow Sculptures" - 3:38
3. "Heros Sont Fatigues" - 7:41
4. "Red Giant" - 3:08
5. "Windows in Dreams/Colors in Crystal" - 23:07

== Personnel ==
- Joe McPhee - tenor saxophone, trumpet, pocket trumpet, flugelhorn, E-Flat alto, modified nagoya harp, chimes, voice
- John Snyder - synthesizers
