= Tenor (album) =

Live album by Joe McPhee
- Released: 1977
- Recorded: September 1 & 2, 1976 at Michael Overhage's farmhouse in Adlemsried, Switzerland and October 8, 1977 at Palais des Glaces in Paris, France (Bonus track)
- Genre: Jazz
- Length: 35:03
- Label: HatHut hat HUT C
- Producer: Werner X. Uehlinger

Joe McPhee chronology
The Willisau Concert (1975)	Tenor (1977)	Rotation (1977)

Tenor & Fallen Angels Cover

Tenor is a live solo album by multi–instrumentalist and composer Joe McPhee, recorded in 1976 in Switzerland. It was the third album released on the Swiss HatHut label. It was reissued in 2000 as Tenor & Fallen Angels with a bonus track recorded in Paris.

== Reception ==
Professional ratings
Review scores
Source	Rating
Allmusic	4/5 stars
All About Jazz	5/5 stars
The Penguin Guide to Jazz Recordings	3/4 stars

Allmusic reviewer Steve Loewy stated "McPhee was (and is) a master of new sounds. He trailblazes paths, unafraid of consequences, devoid of cliches. His improvisations incorporate squeaks and squeals, but also bop-like stabs and outrageously radical runs that scream for attention. McPhee has come a long way since this major recording, but this still remains one of the best solo tenor albums of avant–garde jazz". On All About Jazz writer Glen Astarita noted "Tenor & Fallen Angels is a brilliant portraiture of a musician who is sharing his sentiments, visualizations and artistic spirit for the entire world to hear! – Essential". The Penguin Guide to Jazz Recordings describes the album as “packed with rich ideas.”

== Track listing ==
All compositions by Joe McPhee

1. "Knox" - 8:34
2. "Good-Bye Tom B." - 6:34
3. "Sweet Dragon" - 5:35
4. "Tenor" - 23:26
5. "Fallen Angels" - 14:59 Bonus track on CD reissue

== Personnel ==
- Joe McPhee - tenor saxophone
