= 12 (+6) In a Row =

Studio album by Paul Bley
- Released: 1991
- Recorded: May 23–24, 1990
- Studios: Foundation Artists' House, Boswil, Switzerland
- Genre: Jazz
- Length: 58:48
- Label: hat ART 6081
- Producers: Pia and Werner X. Uehlinger

Paul Bley chronology
Memoirs (1990)	12 (+6) In a Row (1991)	Right Time, Right Place (1990)

12 (+6) In a Row is an album by Paul Bley with Hans Koch and Franz Koglmann recorded in Switzerland in 1990 and released on the hat ART label the following year.

== Reception ==
Professional ratings
Review scores
Source	Rating
AllMusic	4.5/5 stars
The Guardian	4/5 stars

Thom Jurek of AllMusic states, "In all, this is one of Bley's most curious and intimate works, where his own musical mind is given problems -- presented by serialism and its own undoing -- and his ways of resolving them or casting them out of his vocabulary. Brilliant". The Guardian review by John Fordham awarded the album 4 stars noting "This is perhaps predominantly a set for free-jazz fans; however, it's jostling with absorbing melody, and all 18 tracks are invitingly short".

== Track listing ==
All compositions by Paul Bley, Hans Koch & Franz Koglmann except as indicated

1. "Solo 1" (Bley) - 3:13
2. "Trio 1" - 3:37
3. "Solo 2" (Bley) - 3:34
4. "Trio 2" - 2:22
5. "Solo 3" (Bley) - 3:27
6. "Trio 3" - 3:04
7. "Duo 1" (Bley, Koch) - 1:59
8. "Duo 2" (Bley Koch) - 1:58
9. "Duo 3" (Bley, Koglmann) - 2:17
10. "Solo 4" (Bley) - 4:27
11. "Trio 4" - 2:59
12. "Solo 5" (Bley) - 3:47
13. "Trio 5" - 4:57
14. "Solo 6" (Bley) - 4:57
15. "Trio 6" - 4:28
16. "Solo 7" (Bley) - 2:37
17. "Trio 7" - 2:20
18. "Solo 8" (Bley) - 3:07

== Personnel ==
- Paul Bley - piano
- Franz Koglmann - flugelhorn
- Hans Koch - clarinet, saxophone
