= We Thought About Duke =

Studio album by Franz Koglmann and Lee Konitz
- Released: 1995
- Recorded: June 6–9, 1994
- Studio: Tic-Music Studio, Achau, Austria
- Genre: Jazz
- Length: 56:25
- Label: HatART; CD 6163
- Producer: Ulrich Kurth, Werner X. Uehlinger

Franz Koglmann chronology
Annette (1992)	We Thought About Duke (1995)	Cantos I-IV (1995)

Lee Konitz chronology
Rhapsody II (1994)	We Thought About Duke (1994)	Haiku (1994)

We Thought About Duke is an album by trumpeter/flugelhornist Franz Koglmann and saxophonist Lee Konitz which was recorded in Austria in 1994 and released on the Swiss HatART label.

== Reception ==
Professional ratings
Review scores
Source	Rating
Allmusic	4/5 stars
The Penguin Guide to Jazz Recordings	3.5/4 stars

The Allmusic review by Alex Henderson states: "predictability isn't a problem on We Thought About Duke, a cerebral post-bop date that trumpeter/flugelhornist Franz Koglmann co-led with alto sax master Lee Konitz. This is definitely one of the more daring Ellington tributes that came out of the '90s. Instead of inundating us with standards that we've heard time and time again ... Koglmann's arrangements have strong classical/chamber music leanings, and his admiration for Gil Evans is evident. For those seeking an Ellington tribute that is adventurous rather than conventional, We Thought About Duke is highly recommended".

== Track listing ==
1. "Lament for Javanette" (Duke Ellington, Billy Strayhorn, Barney Bigard) – 5:15
2. "Ko Ko" (Ellington) – 4:14
3. "Zweet Zurzday" (Ellington, Strayhorn) – 8:01
4. "Thoughts About Duke I" (Franz Koglmann) – 6:30
5. "Thoughts About Duke II" (Koglmann) – 4:34
6. "Love Is in My Heart" (Ellington) – 5:29
7. "Pyramid" (Juan Tizol) – 5:52
8. "Thoughts About Duke III" (Koglmann) – 4:33
9. "The Mooche" (Ellington, Irving Mills) – 5:49
10. "Dirge" (Strayhorn) – 6:08

== Personnel ==
- Franz Koglmann – trumpet, flugelhorn
- Lee Konitz – alto saxophone (tracks 1–3 & 5–10)
- Tony Coe – clarinet, tenor saxophone (tracks 1, 3, 5, 6 & 9)
- Burkhard Stangl – guitar (tracks 1, 3, 5, 6 & 9)
- Klaus Koch – bass (tracks 1, 3, 5, 6 & 9)
- Rudolf Ruschel – trombone (tracks 2, 4, 7, 8 & 10)
- Raoul Herget – tuba (tracks 2, 4, 7, 8 & 10)
