= The Willisau Concert =

Live album by Joe McPhee
- Released: 1976
- Recorded: October 11, 1975 at the Mohren Hotel in Willisau, Switzerland
- Genre: Jazz
- Length: 50:00
- Label: HatHut hat HUT B
- Producer: Pia and Werner Uehlinger

Joe McPhee chronology
Pieces of Light (1974)	The Willisau Concert (1976)	Tenor (1976)

The Willisau Concert is a live album by composer and multi-instrumentalist Joe McPhee, recorded in 1975 in Switzerland. It was the second album released on the Swiss Jazz label HatHut.

== Reception ==
Professional ratings
Review scores
Source	Rating
Allmusic	4/5 stars

Allmusic rated the album with four stars.

== Track listing ==
All compositions by Joe McPhee

1. "Touchstone" - 12:30
2. "Voices" - 11:30
3. "Bahamian Folksong" - 16:20
4. "Harriet" - 9:40

== Personnel ==
- Joe McPhee - tenor saxophone, soprano saxophone
- John Snyder - synthesizer, voice
- Makaya Ntshoko - drums
