= Eight (+3) Tristano Compositions, 1989: For Warne Marsh =

Studio album by Anthony Braxton
- Released: 1990
- Recorded: December 10–11, 1989
- Genre: Jazz
- Length: 74:56
- Label: hatART

Anthony Braxton chronology
Duets Vancouver 1989 (1989)	Eight (+3) Tristano Compositions, 1989: For Warne Marsh (1990)	Duets: Hamburg 1991 (1991)

Eight (+3) Tristano Compositions, 1989: For Warne Marsh is an album by American composer and saxophonist Anthony Braxton recorded in 1989 and released on the hatART label. A second edition released in 2012 deletes the tracks "How Deep Is the Ocean?" and "Time on My Hands".

== Reception ==
The Allmusic review by Thom Jurek awarded the album 4½ stars, stating: "Braxton has done numerous recordings of standards, and even a double CD on this same label of his readings of Charlie Parker. But as fine as most of those recordings are, none of them matches the lyrical brilliance and subtle grace of this tribute".

Professional ratings
Review scores
Source	Rating
Allmusic	4.5/5 stars

== Track listing ==
All compositions by Lennie Tristano except as indicated

1. "Two Not One" – 7:20
2. "317 East 32nd Street" – 8:20
3. "Dreams" – 5:46
4. "Lennie's Pennies" – 9:25
5. "How Deep Is the Ocean?" (Irving Berlin) – 4:47
6. "Victory Ball" – 4:50
7. "Sax of a Kind" (Warne Marsh) – 4:10
8. "Lennie-Bird" – 6:30
9. "Time on My Hands" (Harold Adamson, Mack Gordon, Vincent Youmans) – 4:55
10. "Victory Ball [Take 2]" – 5:12
11. "Baby" – 5:15
12. "April" – 8:26
  - Recorded at Sage & Sound Recording Studio in Hollywood, California on December 10 & 11, 1989

== Personnel ==
- Anthony Braxton – sopranino saxophone, flute, alto saxophone
- Jon Raskin – baritone saxophone
- Dred Scott – piano
- Cecil McBee – bass
- Andrew Cyrille – drums
