= Graphics (album) =

Live album by Joe McPhee
- Released: 1978
- Recorded: June 11 & 12, 1977 at Palais des Artes, Paris
- Genre: Jazz
- Length: 78:41
- Label: HatHut hat HUT I/J
- Producer: Craig Johnson and Pia & Werner X. Uehlinger

Joe McPhee chronology
Rotation (1976)	Graphics (1978)	Variations on a Blue Line (1979)

Graphics is a live solo album by multi-instrumentalist and composer Joe McPhee, recorded in 1977 in Paris and first released on the Swiss HatHut label.

== Reception ==
Professional ratings
Review scores
Source	Rating
Allmusic	4/5 stars

Allmusic reviewer Brian Olewnick states "Graphics is a rare gem but a necessary one for the McPhee fan, and is well worth the trouble of seeking out both for its inherent beauty and as a key work in the career of one of the strongest players in the jazz avant-garde of the late 20th century".

== Track listing ==
All compositions by Joe McPhee

1. "Graphics ¾" - 12:23
2. "Legendary Heroes" - 15:02
3. "Vieux Carre/Straight" - 7:04
4. "Daisy Bones" - 2:47
5. "Tenor No. 2" - 6:50
6. "Anamorphosis"- 14:10
7. "Trumpet" - 11:35
8. "Graphics 2/4" - 8:50

== Personnel ==
- Joe McPhee - tenor saxophone, soprano saxophone, trumpet, cornet, bells, conch shell
