= Garden (album) =

Live album by Cecil Taylor
- Released: 1982
- Recorded: November 16, 1981
- Genre: Free jazz
- Label: Hat Hut

Cecil Taylor chronology
The Eighth (1981)	Garden (1982)	Winged Serpent (Sliding Quadrants) (1984)

Garden 2 CD cover

Garden is a live album by Cecil Taylor recorded at Basel Switzerland, November 16, 1981, and released on the Hat Hut label. The album features seven solo performances by Taylor on a Bösendorfer grand piano and was originally released as a double LP in 1982 and then rereleased as two single CDs entitled Garden Part 1 and Garden Part 2 in 1990.

== Reception ==
Professional ratings
Review scores
Source	Rating
AllMusic	4.5/5 stars
The Rolling Stone Jazz Record Guide	4/5 stars

The AllMusic review by Thom Jurek states:

The first volume opened — as do all of his solo performances now — with vocal extemporization and poetry, and on into the slowly evolving gradually revealing performance itself. On the second disc there is nothing but meat. Taylor is in full heat, flailing, banging, slashing out chords and high register trills with studied abandon and a careful attention to detail. Here is where Taylor shows his secret persona: the dancer. Rooted in blues and barrelhouse in some spots and in gagaku and kabuki theater in others, while in still others the classical ballet, Taylor's playing style opens itself to embrace all of the above and spit them back out as part of his own musical iconography... This is a new music by Cecil Taylor, one that invites listeners in and gives them room to move around. This mature phase of Taylor's music is still blooming almost 20 years later, and continues to influence, inspire, and provoke. Garden, Pt. 1 and Pt. 2 is the post-'70s Cecil solo date to have.

== Track listing ==
All compositions by Cecil Taylor.

1. "Elell" - 26:40
2. "Garden II" - 24:40
3. "Garden I + Stepping On Stars" - 20:10
4. "Introduction To Z" - 8:15
5. "Driver Says" - 3:20
6. "Pemmican" - 6:20
7. "Points" - 2:30

- Recorded at Basel Switzerland, November 16, 1981

== Personnel ==
- Cecil Taylor: piano
