= Ballets (album) =

Studio album / Live album by Steve Lacy
- Released: 1982
- Recorded: December 18, 1980 and April 23, 1981
- Venue: L'Ancienne Eglise des Jesuites, Porrentruy, Switzerland
- Studio: Studio Davout, Paris, France
- Genre: Jazz
- Length: 78:30
- Label: hat ART hat ART 1982/83
- Producer: Pia Uehlinger, Werner X. Uehlinger

Steve Lacy chronology
Songs (1980)	Ballets (1982)	Live at Dreher, Paris 1981 (1981)

Ballets is an album by soprano saxophonist Steve Lacy which was recorded live in Switzerland in 1980 and in the studio in Paris in 1981 and first released on the hat ART label as a double LP.

Professional ratings
Review scores
Source	Rating
Allmusic	4/5 stars

== Track listing ==
All compositions by Steve Lacy

1. "Hedges / Squirrel / Fox I" – 18:15
2. "Fox II / Rabbit / Shambles" – 19:40
3. "The 4 Edges: Outline" – 12:45
4. "The 4 Edges: Underline" – 6:35
5. "The 4 Edges: Coastline" – 9:55
6. "The 4 Edges: Deadline" – 11:20

== Personnel ==
- Steve Lacy – soprano saxophone, bells, gong, voice
- Steve Potts – alto saxophone, soprano saxophone (tracks 3–6)
- Bobby Few – piano, Fender Rhodes piano (tracks 3–6)
- Irene Aebi – cello, violin, voice (tracks 3–6)
- Jean-Jacques Avenel – bass (tracks 3–6)
- Oliver Johnson – drums (tracks 3–6)
