= Capers (album) =

Live album by Steve Lacy
- Released: 1981
- Recorded: December 29, 1979
- Venue: Soundscape, NYC
- Genre: Jazz
- Length: 104:20
- Label: HatHut hat Hut FOURTEEN (2R14)
- Producer: Pia Uehlinger, Werner X. Uehlinger

Steve Lacy chronology
Tips (1981)	Capers (1981)	Songs (1981)

Capers is a live album by soprano saxophonist Steve Lacy recorded in New York in 1979 which was first released on the HatHut label in 1981 as a double LP. The album was rereleased as a double LP in 1985 as N.Y. Capers and as a CD in 2000 as N.Y. Capers & Quirks

== Reception ==
Professional ratings
Review scores
Source	Rating
Allmusic	4.5/5 stars
The Penguin Guide to Jazz Recordings	3/4 stars

The Allmusic review by Steve Loewy stated "Some of Steve Lacy's best work comes from his trios. Somehow, he seems most free and confident in this format, curiously more so than in his rare duo or more popular solo outings. Of course, in this instance, it does not hurt for Lacy to be paired with drummer Dennis Charles and bassist Ronnie Boykins, ... For this recording, Lacy is highly focused, his improvisations taking on a more syncopated and aggressive flavor than usual". On All About Jazz, Robert Spencer wrote "This disc, recorded in 1979, captures Lacy during a freer, more fiery period. Boykins, who never got the recognition he deserved for his ground-breaking work on bass in the Sun Ra Arkestra, and Charles, a legendarily incendiary drummer, spur Lacy on to heights of saxophonic fury that are purely and utterly delightful ... all three play excellently throughout. We owe a debt of gratitude to Hat Hut Records for giving us this monument of a great and sparsely-recorded trio". Mike Neely observed "Throughout, Charles and Boykins sustain a complex dialogue with Lacy and with each other that is at times spare and at times strident, but rarely predictable. There are many ways of improvisational intensity and Lacy’s trio seems to have been determined to explore many of the possibilities. This is a very interesting recording by a very curious and lively trio"

== Track listing ==
All compositions by Steve Lacy

1. "The Crunch" – 12:35 Omitted from CD reissue
2. "We Don't I" – 12:55 Omitted from CD reissue
3. "Quirks" – 9:25
4. "Bud's Brother I" – 17:05
5. "Capers" – 9:20
6. "We Don't II" – 16:50
7. "Kitty Malone" – 13:55
8. "Bud's Brother II" – 12:15 Omitted from CD reissue

== Personnel ==
- Steve Lacy – soprano saxophone
- Ronnie Boykins – bass
- Dennis Charles – drums
