= Performance (Quartet) 1979 =

Live album by Anthony Braxton
- Released: 1981
- Recorded: September 1, 1979
- Venue: Willisau Jazz Festival, Switzerland
- Genre: Jazz
- Length: 71:14
- Label: hatART
- Producer: Werner X. Uehlinger

Anthony Braxton chronology
| One in Two – Two in One (1979) | Performance (Quartet) 1979 (1981) | Anthony Braxton / Robert Schumann String Quartet (1979) |

Performance (Quartet) 1979 is a live album by American composer and saxophonist Anthony Braxton recorded in Switzerland in 1979 and released on the hatART label. The album has also been issued as Performance 9/1/79 and Performance for Quartet.

== Reception ==
The Allmusic review awarded the album 3 stars.

Professional ratings
Review scores
| Source | Rating |
|---|---|
| Allmusic | 3/5 stars |
| The Rolling Stone Jazz Record Guide | 5/5 stars |

== Track listing ==
All compositions by Anthony Braxton.

1. "Part I" - 36:48
2. "Part II" - 34:26

== Personnel ==
- Anthony Braxton - soprano saxophone, alto saxophone, clarinet, contrabass clarinet
- Ray Anderson - trombone, alto trombone, little instruments
- John Lindberg - bass
- Thurman Barker - percussion, xylophone, gongs
