= Windward Passages =

Live album by Dave Burrell
- Released: 1980
- Recorded: September 13, 1979
- Genre: Jazz
- Label: hatART

Dave Burrell chronology
Round Midnight (1979)	Windward Passages (1980)	Daybreak (1989)

Windward Passages is a live album by jazz pianist Dave Burrell that is considered "a widely acclaimed jazz-opera." It was recorded on September 13, 1979 in Sweden and released by hatART Records in 1980 on double-LP. hatART released the album again on LP in 1986 and then on CD in 1994.

The album was Burrell's first collaboration with his wife, Monika Larsson, who was a Swedish writer and librettist at the time. Burrell conceived this full-length operatic album as his reply to land development in Hawaii, which was where he was raised. The live performance included various vocal singers, a 21-piece orchestra, dancers and a chorus. At first, Burrell had trouble convincing some vocalists to perform with him because of how fast he played as a jazz pianist; one such example was Hilda Harris of the Metropolitan Opera who told him "I can sing it, but you're playing much too fast."

== Reception ==
Professional ratings
Review scores
Source	Rating
Allmusic	4.5/5 stars

Allmusic notes that Burrell "so thoroughly a pianist, composer, and improviser that the three are inseparable in him" and that this album is the proof. Reviewer Thom Jurek marvels at how, performing live, Burrell is able to provide "lyrical invention and harmonic sense of balance" and how if what he "heard was possible, let alone true."

== Track listing ==
1. "Overture Windward Passages" (Burrell, Larsson) — 5:32
2. "Punaluu Peter" (Burrell, Larsson) — 7:12
3. "Stepping Out (Or, Monday Night Death Rehearsal)" (Burrell, Larsson) — 3:59
4. "On a Saturday Night" (Burrell, Larsson) — 5:54
5. "Sarah's Lament" (Burrell, Larsson) — 5:35
6. "Menehune Messages/Heritage/Carnival" (Burrell, Larsson) — 4:48
7. "Teardrops for Jimmy" (Burrell) — 5:16
8. "I Want to See You Everyday of Your Life" (Burrell, Larsson) — 5:11
9. "Black Robert" (Burrell) — 5:19
10. "My Dog Has Fleas/Polynesian Dreams/Popolo Paniolo" (Burrell, Larsson) — 13:19
11. "A.M. Rag" (Burrell) — 4:55

== Personnel ==
- Dave Burrell — piano

Production:

- Klau Baumgärtner — cover art
- Walter Bosshardt, Robine Clignett — design
- David Crawford — mastering
- Craig Johnson — production coordination
- Peter Pfister — engineer, editing, recording
- Peter Rolle — photography
- Pia Uehlinger — producer
- Werner X. Uehlinger — producer, editing
