= One in Two – Two in One =

1979 live album by Max Roach & Anthony Braxton

One in Two - Two in One

Live album by Max Roach & Anthony Braxton
- Released: 1979
- Recorded: August 31, 1979
- Genre: Jazz
- Length: 74:58
- Label: Hathut
- Producer: Pia Uehlinger

Max Roach chronology
The Long March (1979)	One in Two - Two in One (1979)	Pictures in a Frame (1979)

Anthony Braxton chronology
Alto Saxophone Improvisations 1979 (1979)	One in Two - Two in One (1979)	Performance (Quartet) 1979 (1979)

One in Two – Two in One is a live album by American jazz drummer Max Roach and saxophonist Anthony Braxton, recorded in 1979 for the Swiss Hathut label.

== Reception ==
Professional ratings
Review scores
Source	Rating
All About Jazz	4/5 stars
AllMusic	5/5 stars
The Penguin Guide to Jazz Recordings	3/4 stars
The Rolling Stone Jazz Record Guide	3/5 stars

The AllMusic review by Scott Yanow stated: "With Roach pushing Braxton, the results are quite adventurous, yet full of joy. Followers of avant-garde jazz can consider this set to be essential." All About Jazz reviewer Chris May noted: "This is music which demands the full attention of the listener to reveal all of its considerable beauty—but it's not 'difficult' music. It's consistently melodic, and often, but not always, played with a fixed meter. It's subtle, it's layered and it's got depth. It's a blast."

== Track listing ==
All compositions by Max Roach and Anthony Braxton

1. "One in Two - Two in One Part 1" - 35:28
2. "One in Two - Two in One Part 2" - 39:30

- Recorded at the Jazz Festival Willisau '79 in Willisau, Switzerland on August 31, 1979

== Personnel ==
- Anthony Braxton - alto saxophone, soprano saxophone, sopranino saxophone, contrabass clarinet, clarinet, flute
- Max Roach - percussion, gongs, tuned cymbals
