= Anthony Braxton's Charlie Parker Project 1993 =

Studio album /Live album by Anthony Braxton
- Released: 1995
- Recorded: October 21–23, 1993
- Venue: Rote Fabrik, Zürich, Switzerland
- Studio: Großer Sendesaal WDR, Köln, Germany
- Genre: Jazz
- Length: 130:07
- Label: HatART; CD 2-6160
- Producer: Ulrich Kurth, Werner X. Uehlinger

Anthony Braxton chronology
Quartet (Santa Cruz) 1993 (1993)	Anthony Braxton's Charlie Parker Project 1993 (1995)	Duo (Leipzig) 1993 (1993)

Anthony Braxton's Charlie Parker Project 1993 is an album featuring live and studio performances of compositions associated with Charlie Parker arranged and performed by saxophonist Anthony Braxton which was recorded in Switzerland and Germany in 1993 and released on the HatART label as a double CD in 1995.

== Reception ==
Professional ratings
Review scores
Source	Rating
Allmusic	4/5 stars
All About Jazz	4.5/5 stars
The Penguin Guide to Jazz Recordings	3.5/4 stars

The Allmusic review by Scott Yanow stated "Braxton uses the melodies and some of the original structures of such tunes as "Hot House," "Night in Tunisia," "Bebop," and "Ko Ko" as the basis for colorful and often-stunning improvisations. He does not feel restricted to the old boundaries of the 1940s and '50s, preferring to pay tribute to the spirit and chance-taking of Charlie Parker rather than to merely recreate the past. The passionate and unpredictable results are quite stimulating and full of surprises, fresh ideas and wit. It's highly recommended to those jazz followers who have very open ears". All About Jazz noted "Charlie Parker may not yet be antique, but it's no easy matter to connect his music with the drive, intensity, and collective freedom that came of age in the '60s and has been honed to a fine edge ever since. The sheer magnitude of this recording does not in any way compromise its free spirit. The Charlie Parker Project makes all sorts of unexpected connections in a spontaneous, forward-looking way>"

== Track listing ==
All compositions by Charlie Parker except where noted.

Disc one

1. "Hot House" (Tadd Dameron) – 15:05
2. "A Night in Tunisia" (Dizzy Gillespie) – 9:02
3. "Dewey Square" – 12:28
4. "Klact-Oveeseds-Tene" – 8:46
5. "An Oscar for Treadwell" – 19:37
- Recorded at Rote Fabrik in Zürich on October 21, 1993

Disc two

1. "Bebop" (Gillespie) – 8:22
2. "Bongo Bop" – 6:45
3. "Yardbird Suite" – 8:14
4. "A Night in Tunisia" (Gillespie) – 8:28
5. "Passport" – 6:30
6. "Klact-Oveeseds-Tene" – 7:06
7. "Scrapple from the Apple" – 5:15
8. "Mohawk" – 2:45
9. "Sippin' at Bells" (Miles Davis) – 4:08
10. "Ko-Ko" – 7:36
- Recorded at Großer Sendesaal WDR in Köln October 22–23, 1993

== Personnel ==
- Anthony Braxton – alto saxophone, sopranino saxophone, contrabass clarinet
- Ari Brown – tenor saxophone, soprano saxophone
- Paul Smoker – trumpet & flugelhorn
- Misha Mengelberg – piano
- Joe Fonda – bass
- Han Bennink (Disc One), Pheeroan akLaff (Disc Two) – drums
