= Flight, Bremen 1961 =

Live album by Jimmy Giuffre
- Released: 1993
- Recorded: November 23, 1961, at Sendesaal Radio Bremen, Bremen, Germany
- Genre: Jazz, cool jazz, third stream
- Length: 62:37
- Label: Hat Hut
- Producer: Radio Bremen, Werner X. Uehlinger

Jimmy Giuffre chronology
| Emphasis, Stuttgart 1961 (1961) | Flight, Bremen 1961 (1993) | Free Fall (1961) |

Professional ratings
Review scores
| Source | Rating |
|---|---|
| Allmusic | 4.5/5 stars |

Flight, Bremen 1961 is an album by the Jimmy Giuffre 3 recorded live at Sendesaal of regional public broadcaster Radio Bremen, Germany, on November 23, 1961. It was first released in 1993 by hatArt, and re-released by HatOLOGY (another imprint of Hathut Records) in combination with a previous recording from the same concert tour called Emphasis & Flight 1961 (2003).

== Track listing ==
All songs written by Jimmy Giuffre unless otherwise noted.

1. "Call of the Centaur" - 3:59
2. "Postures" (Paul Bley) - 6:56
3. "Sonic" - 5:21
4. "Goodbye" (Gordon Jenkins) - 5:56
5. "Stretching Out (Suite for Germany)" - 11:12
6. "Cry, Want" - 7:34
7. "Flight" - 5:39
8. "That's True, That's True" - 8:39
9. "Trance" - 5:51
10. "Whirrrr" - 2:31

== Personnel ==
- Jimmy Giuffre - clarinet
- Steve Swallow - double bass
- Paul Bley - piano
