= Emphasis, Stuttgart 1961 =

Live album by Jimmy Giuffre
- Released: 1993
- Recorded: November 7, 1961 at Mozartsaal, Liederhalle Stuttgart, Germany
- Genre: Jazz, cool jazz, third stream
- Length: 52:00
- Label: hatArt, reissue on HatOLOGY
- Producer: Sueddeutscher Rundfunk, Werner X. Uehlinger

Jimmy Giuffre chronology
Thesis (1961)	Emphasis, Stuttgart 1961 (1993)	Flight, Bremen 1961 (1961)

Professional ratings
Review scores
Source	Rating
Allmusic	4.5/5 stars

Emphasis, Stuttgart 1961 is an album by the Jimmy Giuffre 3 recorded live at the Liederhalle in Stuttgart, Germany, November 7, 1961, by the regional public broadcaster Sueddeutscher Rundfunk. It was first released in 1993 by hatArt and later Harmonia Mundi; it was re-released by HatOLOGY (another imprint of Hathut Records) in combination with a further recording from the same concert tour called Emphasis & Flight 1961 (2003).

== Track listing ==
1. "Whirrrr" – 4:15
2. "Emphasis" – 7:48
3. "Sonic" – 5:17
4. "Venture" – 4:21
5. "Jesus Maria" (Carla Bley) – 6:14
6. "Stretching Out (Suite for Germany)" – 11:20
7. "Carla" (Paul Bley) – 5:45
8. "Cry, Want" – 7:00

All songs written by Jimmy Giuffre unless otherwise noted.

== Personnel ==
- Paul Bley – piano
- Jimmy Giuffre – clarinet
- Steve Swallow – double bass
