= Stamps (album) =

Live album by Steve Lacy
- Released: 1979
- Recorded: August 27, 1977 and February 22, 1978
- Venue: Jazz Festival Willisau '77, Switzerland and Jazz au Totem, Paris, France
- Genre: Jazz
- Label: HatHut; HAT K/L
- Producer: Pia Uehlinger, Werner X. Uehlinger

Steve Lacy chronology
| Clinkers (1978) | Stamps (1979) | Points (1979) |

Stamps is a live album by soprano saxophonist Steve Lacy recorded in Switzerland in 1977 and France in 1978 which was released on the HatHut label in 1979.

== Reception ==
Professional ratings
Review scores
| Source | Rating |
|---|---|
| Allmusic | 4.5/5 stars |

The Allmusic review by Scott Yanow stated "Steve Lacy and his quintet are well featured on this double LP which documents two appearances at European festivals. ... Overall this set gives one a good example of Steve Lacy's late-'70s group and its distinctive music".

== Track listing ==
All compositions by Steve Lacy

1. "Existence" – 12:58
2. "Ire" – 11:29
3. "The Dumps" – 12:00
4. "Follies" – 11:11 Additional track on CD reissue
5. "Stamps" – 4:52
6. "Duckles" – 13:02
7. "Wickets" – 11:35
8. "The Blinks" – 9:17

== Personnel ==
- Steve Lacy – soprano saxophone, Japanese bird whistle
- Steve Potts – alto saxophone, soprano saxophone
- Irene Aebi – cello, violin, bells, vocals
- Kent Carter – bass
- Oliver Johnson – drums
