= Glasses (album) =

Live album by Joe McPhee
- Released: 1979
- Recorded: October 13, 1977, at Café Calvado, Tavannes, Switzerland
- Genre: Jazz
- Length: 35:03
- Label: HatHut hat HUT P
- Producer: Werner X. Uehlinger

Joe McPhee chronology
Variations on a Blue Line (1977)	Glasses (1979)	MFG in Minnesota (1978)

Glasses is a live album by multi-instrumentalist and composer Joe McPhee, recorded in 1977 in Switzerland and first released on the Swiss HatHut label 1979.

== Reception ==
Professional ratings
Review scores
Source	Rating
Allmusic	3/5 stars

Allmusic gave the album 3 stars.

== Track listing ==
All compositions by Joe McPhee except as indicated

1. "Glasses" - 18:30
2. "Naima" (John Coltrane) - 8:10
3. "New Potatoes" - 15:25

== Personnel ==
- Joe McPhee - tenor saxophone
- Reto Weber - percussion
