= Gravitational Systems =

Studio album by Matthew Shipp
- Released: 2000
- Recorded: May 10, 1998
- Studio: Sorcerer Sound, New York City
- Genre: Jazz
- Length: 58:50
- Label: hatOLOGY
- Producer: Art Lange, Pia & Werner X. Uehlinger

Matthew Shipp chronology
Magnetism (1999)	Gravitational Systems (2000)	Pastoral Composure (2000)

Gravitational Systems is an album by American jazz pianist Matthew Shipp featuring a duo with violinist Mat Maneri, which was recorded in 1998 and released on the Swiss hatOLOGY label. Shipp played previously with Maneri on the albums Critical Mass, The Flow of X and By the Law of Music, but this was their first duo performance. The recording includes a rendition of the English traditional song "Greensleeves" and a version of John Coltrane's classic "Naima".

== Reception ==
Professional ratings
Review scores
Source	Rating
AllMusic	4.5/5 stars
The New Rolling Stone Album Guide	3/5 stars
The Penguin Guide to Jazz Recordings	3/4 stars

In his review for AllMusic, Steve Loewy states that "Shipp is joined throughout by long-time collaborator, violinist Mat Maneri, whose perky and celebratory virtuosic runs are a perfect foil to the pianist's dense, sometimes morose underpinnings." The All About Jazz review by Glenn Astarita says that "Gravitational Systems brings to light the irresistible tendencies and similar jazz vernaculars of two modern day jazz pioneers who jointly display a great deal of synergy, depth and heart."

== Track listing ==
All compositions by Matthew Shipp except as indicated

1. "Elasticity" – 4:48
2. "Greensleeves" (Traditional) – 4:43
3. "Series of Planes" – 5:31
4. "Knots" – 4:41
5. "Notes" – 5:11
6. "Two Elements" – 5:33
7. "Landscape Harmony" – 8:33
8. "Forcefield" – 8:19
9. "Gravitational Systems" – 8:15
10. "Naima" (John Coltrane) – 3:16

== Personnel ==
- Matthew Shipp – piano
- Mat Maneri – violin
