= The Cry (Steve Lacy album) =

Live album by Steve Lacy + 6
- Released: May 4, 1999
- Recorded: March 8, 1998
- Venue: AMR Jazz Festival, The Alhambra, Geneva, Switzerland
- Genre: Jazz
- Length: 86:54
- Label: Soul Note; SN 1315
- Producer: Steve Lacy

Steve Lacy chronology
Sands (1998)	The Cry (1999)	The Rent (1999)

The Cry is a live album by soprano saxophonist Steve Lacy recorded at the AMR Jazz Festival in Geneva in 1998 and released on the Italian Soul Note label as a double CD in 1999.

== Reception ==
Professional ratings
Review scores
Source	Rating
Allmusic	3/5 stars

Allmusic reviewer Tom Schulte stated "Saxophonist Lacy provides listeners with an engaging, lyrical selection of material. ... An entirely different face of Lacy, this is the man at his experimental best". All About Jazz noted "Although The Cry furthers the fascination soprano saxophonist Steve Lacy has previously established with setting the work of women writers to music, it also breaks significant new ground in its bold, uncompromising feminist political slant. In that single respect, The Cry could well prove to be as controversial as it is compelling".

== Track listing ==
All compositions by Steve Lacy with text by Taslima Nasrin except where noted

Disc One:

1. "Cannonade" – 1:39
2. "Character" – 4:06
3. "Straight Path" – 5:18
4. "Granary" – 6:31
5. "Divorce Letter" – 5:51
6. "Divided" – 5:07
7. "Agression" – 6:53

Disc Two:

1. "Désir D'Amour" – 7:21
2. "Body Theory" – 7:10
3. "Dark and Handsome" – 6:27
4. "Acquaintance" – 6:40
5. "The Cry" – 11:56
6. "Rundown (Ambapali Speaks)" (text by Ambapali) – 10:55

== Personnel ==
- Steve Lacy - soprano saxophone
- Tina Wrase - soprano saxophone, sopranino saxophone, bass clarinet
- Petia Kaufman – harpsichord
- Cathrin Pfeifer – accordion
- Jean-Jacques Avenel - bass
- Daniel "Topo" Gioia – percussion
- Irene Aebi - voice
- Wanda Savy – scenery, lights
- Pia Myrvold – dress
