= Oleo (Joe McPhee album) =

Studio album by Joe McPhee Po Music
- Released: 1983
- Recorded: August 2, 1982 at Foundation Artist House in Boswil, Switzerland.
- Genre: Jazz
- Length: 42:35
- Label: HatHut hat MUSICS 3514
- Producer: Pia & Werner X. Uehlinger

Joe McPhee chronology
Topology (1981)	Oleo (1983)	Visitation (1983)

Oleo & A Future Retrospective Cover

Oleo is an album by multi-instrumentalist and composer Joe McPhee, recorded in 1982 and first released on the Swiss HatHut label in 1983 it was rereleased on CD in 1992 as Oleo & A Future Retrospective with bonus tracks recorded later that evening.

== Reception ==
Professional ratings
Review scores
Source	Rating
Allmusic	4.5/5 stars
The Penguin Guide to Jazz Recordings	3/4 stars

Allmusic reviewer Brian Olewnick states "It remains not only a wonderful session in its own right but also one of the more approachable entries into this superior musician's realm. Highly recommended". All About Jazz writer Clifford Allen said "McPhee has hit on a central concept in jazz and improvised music with his engagement of lateral thinking. Improvisation, for it to be successful, must occur on an equal level between participants, a conversation in one room, at one table, even if the plates and silverware differ. The fact that this session is somewhat hit-or-miss does not defer from the notion of Po Music, for ebb and flow must include failures as well as successes".

== Track listing ==
All compositions by Joe McPhee except as indicated

1. "Oleo" [Take 1] (Sonny Rollins) - 5:25
2. "Pablo" - 8:54
3. "Future Retrospective" - 7:00
4. "Astral Spirits" - 7:12
5. "Oleo" [Take 2] (Rollins) - 4:37
6. "I Remember Clifford" (Benny Golson) - 3:26
7. "Ann Kahlé" - 5:41
8. "When You Hear Music" - 8:13 Bonus track on CD reissue
9. "After It's Over" - 7:40 Bonus track on CD reissue
10. "It's Gone In the Air" - 11:51 Bonus track on CD reissue
11. "You Can Never Capture It Again" - 7:43 Bonus track on CD reissue

== Personnel ==
- Joe McPhee - tenor saxophone, cornet
- André Jaume - clarinet, bass clarinet, alto saxophone
- Raymond Boni - guitar
- François Mechali - bass (tracks 1–7)
