= Prospectus (album) =

Live album by Steve Lacy Seven
- Released: 1983
- Recorded: November 1–2, 1982
- Venue: IRCAM Espace de Projection, Paris, France
- Genre: Jazz
- Label: hat ART hat ART 2001
- Producer: Pia Uehlinger, Werner X. Uehlinger

Steve Lacy chronology
The Flame (1982)	Prospectus (1983)	At the Bimhaus (1983)

Cliches Cover

Prospectus is a live album by soprano saxophonist Steve Lacy, recorded in France in 1982 and first released on the hat ART label in 1983 as a double LP. The album was rereleased as a single CD with only five tracks in 1999 as Clichés.

== Reception ==
Professional ratings
Review scores
Source	Rating
All About Jazz	5/5 stars
AllMusic	4/5 stars

The AllMusic review by Scott Yanow stated, "Lacy offered an alternative way to play free jazz, contrasting sound and silence and taking thoughtful and often-scalar improvisations not absent of melody and lyricism, but still quite adventurous and unpredictable. This is one of many excellent recordings of Lacy's music". Reviewing the CD reissue for All About Jazz, Glenn Astarita said, "Cliches is absolutely essential listening for fans of this brilliant soprano saxophonist-composer! ... the indications are that of a world class musician who along with his estimable bandmates present the jazz world with 63-minutes of music magic as Cliches is yet another noteworthy addition to Steve Lacy’s distinguished recorded legacy!".

== Track listing ==
All compositions by Steve Lacy

1. "Stamps" – 6:50
2. "Wickets" – 11:30
3. "The Whammies" – 5:10
4. "Prospectus" – 6:00 Omitted from single CD reissue
5. "The Dumps (Take 1)" – 17:10
6. "Cliches" – 22:40
7. "The Dumps (Take 2)" – 15:35 Omitted from single CD reissue
8. "Retreat" – 7:45 Omitted from single CD reissue

== Personnel ==
- Steve Lacy – soprano saxophone, voice
- George Lewis – trombone
- Steve Potts – alto saxophone, soprano saxophone
- Bobby Few – piano
- Irene Aebi – cello, violin, voice
- Jean-Jacques Avenel – bass
- Oliver Johnson – percussion
- Cyrille Few – percussion (track 6)
- Sherry Margolin – percussion (track 6)
