= Time Zones (album) =

1977 studio album by Richard Teitelbaum and Anthony Braxton

Studio album /Live album by Richard Teitelbaum and Anthony Braxton
- Released: 1977
- Recorded: June 10 and September 16, 1976; Creative Music Festival, Mount Tremper, NY, and Bearsville Sound, Woodstock, NY
- Genre: Jazz
- Length: 42:51
- Label: Freedom; AL 1037
- Producer: Michael Cuscuna and Richard Teitelbaum

Anthony Braxton chronology
Duets 1976 (1976)	Time Zones (1977)	Donaueschingen (Duo) 1976 (1976)

Time Zones is an album by electronic musician Richard Teitelbaum and saxophonist Anthony Braxton, recorded in 1976 and released on the Freedom label.

== Reception ==
Professional ratings
Review scores
Source	Rating
AllMusic	4/5 stars

The AllMusic review by Brian Olewnick stated: "The two had a long and fruitful relationship and these pieces give a good idea why: both possessed probing intelligence that enabled them to dig deep into each other's individual musical languages, unearthing surprising common ground as well as acknowledging differences". In JazzTimes, Bill Shoemaker wrote: "Teitelbaum is in a class by himself when it comes to improvising with synthesizers. His ability to morph from horn-like voice to viscous texture, to melt between foreground and background, and to incite inspired improvisations from Braxton (especially an alto solo at the end of 'Crossings', which unravels from desultory lyricism to an eerie reed effect), is thoroughly engaging".

== Track listing ==
All compositions by Richard Teitelbaum.

1. "Crossing" - 23:58
2. "Behemoth Dreams" - 18:53
- Recorded at the Creative Music Festival in Mount Tremper, NY on June 10, 1976 (track 1) and at Bearsville Sound in Woodstock, NY on September 16, 1976 (track 2)

== Personnel ==
- Richard Teitelbaum - Moog modular synthesizer, micromoog
- Anthony Braxton - sopranino saxophone, alto saxophone, contrabass clarinet
