= Duets: Hamburg 1991 =

Studio album by Anthony Braxton and Peter Niklas Wilson
- Released: 1992
- Recorded: February 21 & 23, 1991
- Genre: Jazz
- Length: 69:44
- Label: Music & Arts

Anthony Braxton chronology
(1989/91)	Duets: Hamburg 1991 (1992)	Willisau (Quartet) 1991 (1991)

Duets: Hamburg 1991 is an album by American composer and saxophonist Anthony Braxton, recorded in 1991 and released on the Music & Arts label.

== Reception ==
The AllMusic review by Thom Jurek stated: "This is a fascinating disc due in large part of Mr. Wilson's truly virtuoso playing of very difficult material, and for the rugged emotionalism Braxton puts into his own performance here".

Professional ratings
Review scores
Source	Rating
AllMusic	4/5 stars
The Penguin Guide to Jazz Recordings	4/4 stars

== Track listing ==
All compositions by Anthony Braxton.

1. "Composition No. 156" - 8:49
2. "Composition No. 157 [Take One]" - 7:08
3. "Composition No. 152" - 10:54
4. "Composition No. 153" - 12:26
5. "Composition No. 155" - 6:00
6. "Composition No. 154" - 7:15
7. "Composition No. 40a" - 8:32
8. "Composition No. 157 [Take Two]" - 8:40
- Recorded at Müggenpark Studios in Hamburg, Germany on February 21 & 23, 1991

== Personnel ==
- Anthony Braxton - sopranino saxophone, alto saxophone, flute, contrabass clarinet
- Peter Niklas Wilson - bass
