= Richard Teitelbaum =

American composer (1939–2020)

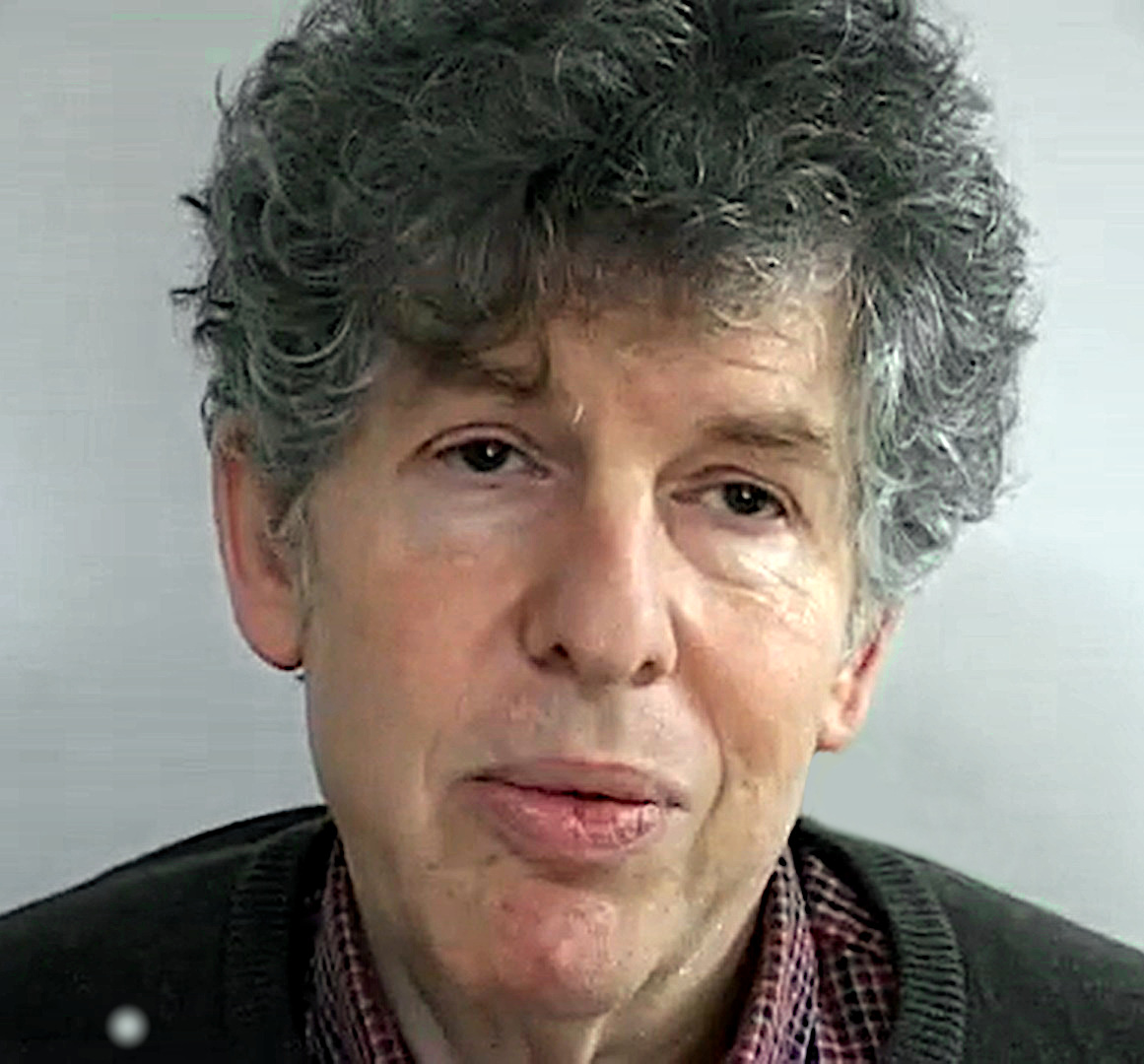
Teitelbaum (circa 2003)

Richard Lowe Teitelbaum (May 19, 1939 – April 9, 2020) was an American composer, keyboardist, and improvisor. A student of Allen Forte, Mel Powell, and Luigi Nono, he was known for his live electronic music and synthesizer performances. He was a pioneer of brain-wave music. He was also involved with world music and used Japanese, Indian, and western classical instruments and notation in both composition and improvisational settings.

== Biography ==
Born in New York City, Teitelbaum remembered listening to his father (a successful lawyer) play piano while he was a child. A 1960 graduate of Haverford College, Teitelbaum continued keyboard studies at Mannes School of Music, then pursued his Masters in Music at Yale. He won a Fulbright grant to study in Italy in 1964 with Goffredo Petrassi, then in 1965 with Luigi Nono. While at Haverford, Teitelbaum met the composer Henry Cowell, and, following Cowell's death, became an executor of the Cowell estate.

While in Italy, he became a founding member of Musica Elettronica Viva with Alvin Curran and Frederic Rzewski. In the mid-1960s he began researching the use of brain-waves to control musical events and, as a result, he brought the first Moog synthesizer to Europe in 1967. His piece In Tune was first performed with Barbara Mayfield in late 1967.

In 1970, he returned to the US to study Ethnomusicology at Wesleyan University; while there he founded the World Band (one of the first inter-cultural improvisatory ensembles) with the master musicians teaching in that program.

In 1976 and 1977, another Fulbright fellowship allowed Teitelbaum to travel to Japan, where he studied gagaku (learning hichiriki from Masataro Togi, the chief court musician of Japan's Imperial Household music department), as well as shakuhachi with Katsuya Yokoyama.

Teitelbaum provided the score for the 1979 animated short film Asparagus, written and directed by Suzan Pitt.

Teitelbaum also collaborated with Anthony Braxton, Nam June Paik, Joan Jonas, Andrew Cyrille, Leroy Jenkins, Steve Lacy, Alvin Lucier, and David Behrman, among many others.

Teitelbaum lived in upstate New York and taught at Bard College beginning in 1988, and was the director of their Electronic Music Studio. He died of a stroke on April 9, 2020, and is survived by his wife, the classical pianist Hiroko Sakurazawa. He was 80 years old.

== Awards ==
Teitelbaum was awarded a Guggenheim, the two Fulbrights mentioned above, and grants from the National Endowment for the Arts, the New York State Council on the Arts, the New York Foundation for the Arts, the Venice Biennale, The Rockefeller Foundation, and the Asian Cultural Council.

== Discography ==
- Time Zones (Freedom, 1976) with Anthony Braxton
- Hiuchi-Ishi (Denon Jazz, 1978)
- Blends & The Digital Pianos (Lumina, 1984)
- Concerto Grosso (hat ART, 1985 [1988])
- The Sea Between (Victo, 1988) with Carlos Zíngaro
- Cyberband (Moers Music, 1993)
- Golem (Tzadik, 1994)
- Duet: Live At Merkin Hall, NYC (Music & Arts, 1994) with Anthony Braxton
- Double Clutch (Silkheart, 1997) with Andrew Cyrille
- Shift (For 4 Ears, 1997) with Hans Burgener and Martin Schütz
- >11>Ways>to>Proceed (For 4 Ears, 1999) with Hans Burgener, Günter Müller and Carlos Zíngaro as BTMZ
- Blends (New Albion, 2002) with Katsuya Yokoyama
- Evocation (Infrequent Seams, 2022) with Andrew Cyrille and Elliott Sharp, recorded in 2011

With Anthony Braxton

- Trio and Duet (Sackville, 1974)
- New York, Fall 1974 (Arista.1975)
- Creative Orchestra Music 1976 (Arista, 1976)
- Open Aspects '82 (Hat Hut Records, 1995)

With Company

- Once (Incus, 1989)

With Marilyn Crispell

- Dream Libretto (Leo, 2018)

With Andrew Cyrille

- The Declaration of Musical Independence (ECM, 2014 [2016])

With Leroy Jenkins

- Space Minds, New Worlds, Survival of America (Tomato, 1978)

With Steve Lacy

- Sideways (Roaratorio, 1968 [2000])

With Joëlle Léandre

- Joëlle Léandre Project (Leo, 1999)

With George E. Lewis

- Homage to Charles Parker (Black Saint, 1979)
- Chicago Slow Dance (Lovely Music, 1981)

With Musica Elettronica Viva

- Friday (Polydor, 1969)
- The Sound Pool (BYG Actuel, 1969)
- Live Electronic Music Improvised (Mainstream, 1970) - split album with AMM
- United Patchwork (Horo, 1978)
