= Free Advice =

Studio album by Pandelis Karayorgis
- Released: 2007
- Recorded: June 9 & 10, 2004
- Genre: Jazz
- Length: 62:22
- Label: Clean Feed
- Producer: Pandelis Karayorgis

Pandelis Karayorgis chronology
We Will Make a Home for You (2005)	Free Advice (2007)	Chicago Approach (2007)

Free Advice is an album by jazz pianist Pandelis Karayorgis, which was recorded in 2004 and released on the Portuguese Clean Feed label. It was the second recording by mi3, a trio with bassist Nate McBride and drummer Curt Newton. For the group's first album, We Will Make a Home for You, Karayorgis plays the Fender Rhodes electric piano, but for this record he switches to acoustic piano. The album includes covers of pieces by Duke Ellington, Hasaan Ibn Ali and Sun Ra.

== Reception ==
The JazzTimes review by Steve Greenlee states "Karayorgis has absorbed and internalized the likes of Thelonious Monk, Andrew Hill, Cecil Taylor, Matthew Shipp and probably plenty of other left-of-center pianists from across the generations. Bebop informs his style, but he trades in contrast and open space."

The All About Jazz by Troy Collins says "A strong outing recalling the heady trio interaction of Money Jungle and Featuring the Legendary Hassan, Free Advice is a timeless trio masterpiece destined to surprise listeners for years to come."

The Point of Departure review by Ed Hazell notes that "Pianist Pandelis Karayorgis, bassist Nate McBride, and drummer Curt Newton play an honest, expressive free jazz that’s also playful and intelligent—it feels closer to the wit and high spirits of hard bop or swing than most free piano trios."

== Track listing ==
All compositions by Pandelis Karayorgis except as indicated

1. "The Mystery Song" (Duke Ellington) – 7:25
2. "Who Said What When" – 7:02
3. "Correspondent" – 6:38
4. "Almost Like Me" (Hasaan Ibn Ali) – 8:59
5. "Warm Walley" (Duke Ellington) – 5:22
6. "Fink Sink Tink" – 5:15
7. "Ankhnaton" (Sun Ra) – 7:20
8. "Spinach Pie" – 6:19
9. "Case in Point" – 8:02

== Personnel ==
- Pandelis Karayorgis - piano
- Nate McBride - bass
- Curt Newton - drums
