= Between Speech & Song =

Studio album by Eric Pakula, Pandelis Karayorgis, Eric Rosenthal
- Released: 1994
- Recorded: December 19, 20 & 21, 1993
- Studios: Persona Sound, Cambridge, Massachusetts
- Genre: Jazz
- Length: 64:07
- Label: Cadence Jazz
- Producer: Pandelis Karayorgis

Pandelis Karayorgis chronology
In Time (1994)	Between Speech & Song (1994)	Lines (1995)

Between Speech & Song is an album by a jazz band co-led by alto saxophonist Eric Pakula, pianist Pandelis Karayorgis and drummer Eric Rosenthal, which was recorded in 1993 and released on Cadence Jazz.

== Reception ==
Professional ratings
Review scores
Source	Rating
AllMusic	3/5 stars

In his review for AllMusic, Alex Henderson states "Karayorgis pushes Pakula toward his more cerebral side, and the altoist sounds like he's enjoying every minute of it."

== Track listing ==
1. "Wild White Rat" (Eric Pakula) – 4:02
2. "Me & Kate" (Eric Pakula) – 4:57
3. "Pass the Butter" (Eric Pakula) – 7:04
4. "Jerky Sockets" (Pandelis Karayorgis) – 4:48
5. "If I Fall In Love" (Eric Pakula) – 5:16
6. "Lennie's Pennies" (Lennie Tristano) – 3:26
7. "Tell Me, Tell Me" (Pandelis Karayorgis) – 6:47
8. "Tritone Tango Blues" (Eric Pakula) – 5:40
9. "Segment" (Eric Pakula) – 2:04
10. "August Thursday" (Pandelis Karayorgis) – 4:56
11. "I Know Why You're Lonely" (Eric Pakula) – 5:54
12. "Eric's Alto Ego" (Pandelis Karayorgis) – 4:13
13. "Augmented Blues" (Eric Pakula) – 3:52
14. "Election" (Eric Pakula) – 1:07

== Personnel ==
- Eric Pakula - alto sax
- Pandelis Karayorgis - piano
- Jonathan Robinson - bass
- Eric Rosenthal - drums
- Mat Maneri - electric violin on 7 & 8
