= Blood Ballad =

Studio album by Pandelis Karayorgis
- Released: 2001
- Recorded: April 25 & 26, 2000
- Studios: Acoustic Recording, Brooklyn
- Genre: Jazz
- Length: 55:06
- Label: Leo

Pandelis Karayorgis chronology
No Such Thing (2001)	Blood Ballad (2001)	Disambiguation (2002)

Blood Ballad is an album by jazz pianist Pandelis Karayorgis, which was recorded in 2000 and released on the English Leo label. It was the second album featuring his trio with bassist Nate McBride and drummer Randy Peterson. The title piece was inspired by Billy Strayhorn; "Centennial" is a tribute to Duke Ellington on hundredth anniversary of his birth.

== Reception ==
Professional ratings
Review scores
Source	Rating
AllMusic	3/5 stars
The Penguin Guide to Jazz	3.5/4 stars

In his review for AllMusic, François Couture states "Tighter and more diverse than Heart and Sack, it is also paradoxically a little less exciting. Karayorgis' sense of melody and harmony truly are his own; his playing is as immediately identifiable as Mat Maneri, another Bostonian and regular acolyte."

The Penguin Guide to Jazz notes that "The opening sequence of 'In The Cracks Of Four' and 'Blood Ballad' probably represents Pandelis's best moments on record and a very good place to start exploring his music."

== Track listing ==
All compositions by Pandelis Karayorgis except as indicated

1. "In the Cracks of Four" – 6:05
2. "Blood Ballad" – 6:29
3. "Coming Out of Nothing" – 7:00
4. "Ask" – 8:20
5. "Stomp on One" – 4:36
6. "Tomorrow Was" – 6:55
7. "Centennial" – 5:44
8. "Don't Ask" – 3:48
9. "One Up, One Down" (John Coltrane) – 6:06

== Personnel ==
- Pandelis Karayorgis - piano
- Nate McBride - bass
- Randy Peterson - drums
