= Disambiguation (Pandelis Karayorgis and Mat Maneri album) =

2002 studio album by Pandelis Karayorgis and Mat Maneri

Studio album by Pandelis Karayorgis, Mat Maneri
- Released: 2002
- Recorded: June 2001
- Studio: Acoustic Recording, Brooklyn
- Genre: Jazz
- Length: 48:32
- Label: Leo
- Producer: Pandelis Karayorgis, Leo Feigin

Pandelis Karayorgis chronology
Blood Ballad (2001)	Disambiguation (2002)	Seventeen Pieces (2004)

Mat Maneri chronology
Blue Decco (2000)	Disambiguation (2002)	Sustain (2002)

Disambiguation is an album by a quintet co-led by jazz pianist Pandelis Karayorgis and violinist Mat Maneri, which was recorded in 2001 and released on the English Leo label. Maneri had the idea to ask Karayorgis to write pieces for a quintet date with saxophonist Tony Malaby and bassist Michael Formanek already in mind. Drummer Randy Peterson was on pianist's trio and has long played with Mat in Joe Maneri's quartet.

== Reception ==
Professional ratings
Review scores
Source	Rating
AllMusic	3/5 stars
The Penguin Guide to Jazz	3/4 stars

In his review for AllMusic, François Couture states "It falls to the jazzmen's credit that Disambiguation sounds so unforced and rehearsed, and flows so naturally. The pianist and violist know each other well enough to share a level of comfort that often finds improv musicians turning lazy and remaining on previously charted ground."

The Penguin Guide to Jazz notes that "Pandelis's Monk influence is very evident, and he swings more easily and relaxedly than on most of his previous records."

The JazzTimes review by Ron Wynn says "Pianist Pandelis Karayorgis has constructed five pieces on Disambiguation that are difficult to follow, but rewarding for those willing to hear them."

== Track listing ==
All compositions by Pandelis Karayorgis

1. "Case in Point" – 8:32
2. "Three Plus Three" – 10:01
3. "Matutinal" – 8:47
4. "Disambiguation" – 11:50
5. "Home" – 9:22

== Personnel ==
- Pandelis Karayorgis - piano
- Mat Maneri - violin
- Tony Malaby - tenor sax
- Michael Formanek - bass
- Randy Peterson - drums
