= Betwixt =

Betwixt is an adverb or preposition with roots in Middle English, typically used as another word for between.

Betwixt can also refer to:

- Betwixt (novel), a novel by Tara Bray Smith
- Betwixt!, a musical comedy conceived and written by Ian McFarlane
- Betwixt and Between, a non-fiction book by Albert Camus
- Betwixt & Between, an album by jazz trombonists Kai Winding and J. J. Johnson
- Betwixt (album), a jazz album by jazz pianist Pandelis Karayorgis
