= We Will Make a Home for You =

Live album by Pandelis Karayorgis
- Released: 2005
- Recorded: May 26, 2002, April 11 & May 11, 2003
- Venues: Abbey Lounge, Somerville, Massachusetts; Artist at Large Gallery, Hyde Park, Boston
- Genre: Jazz
- Length: 72:32
- Label: Clean Feed
- Producer: Pandelis Karayorgis

Pandelis Karayorgis chronology
Seventeen Pieces (2004)	We Will Make a Home for You (2005)	Free Advice (2007)

We Will Make a Home for You is an album by jazz pianist Pandelis Karayorgis, which was recorded between 2002 and 2003 and released on the Portuguese Clean Feed label. It was the debut recording by mi3, a trio with bassist Nate McBride and drummer Curt Newton. According to Karayorgis, he plays Fender Rhodes partly out of necessity, since the Abbey Lounge had no piano, and partly out of curiosity for the effect it would have on the music. The album includes covers of pieces by Thelonious Monk, Hasaan Ibn Ali and Eric Dolphy.

== Reception ==
The All About Jazz by Mark Corroto says "The inside/outside take on music, especially Monk, is served well by Karayorgis' use of distortion and wah pedals. This now seemingly very old-school sound get a boost with all the effects laid down."

== Track listing ==
1. "Gazzelloni" (Eric Dolphy) – 11:53
2. "Ugly Beauty" (Thelonious Monk) – 7:00
3. "Shuffle Boil" (Thelonious Monk) – 7:21
4. "3/4 vs 6/8 4/4 Time" (Hasaan Ibn Ali) – 8:45
5. "Monk's Point" (Thelonious Monk) – 11:10
6. "Three Plus Three" (Pandelis Karayorgis) – 6:31
7. "Centennial" (Pandelis Karayorgis) – 4:02
8. "Disambiguation" (Pandelis Karayorgis) – 9:28
9. "We See" (Thelonious Monk) – 6:22

== Personnel ==
- Pandelis Karayorgis - Fender Rhodes
- Nate McBride - bass
- Curt Newton - drums
