= Trinity (Mat Maneri album) =

Studio album by Mat Maneri
- Released: 2001
- Recorded: July 1999
- Studio: Gateway Studio; Kingston, England
- Genre: Jazz
- Length: 63:52
- Label: ECM; ECM 1719
- Producer: Manfred Eicher

Mat Maneri chronology
So What? (1998)	Trinity (2001)	Blue Decco (2000)

Trinity is a solo album by American jazz violinist and composer Mat Maneri recorded in July 1999 and released on ECM in 2001.

== Reception ==
Professional ratings
Review scores
Source	Rating
AllMusic	4/5 stars
The Penguin Guide to Jazz Recordings	3.5/4 stars

The AllMusic review by Thom Jurek awarded the album 4 stars calling it "a mystifying debut by a devastatingly creative and deftly talented musician."

The authors of The Penguin Guide to Jazz Recordings described the album as "an astonishing solo performance, richly textured and deftly executed, and full of the funky simplicity of early jazz."

Writing for All About Jazz, Mark Corroto commented: "The organic freedom of Maneri's playing on Trinity reveals the source of his energy: the architecture of composition combined with judicious use of space. Trinity is an admirable album of thoughtful and inspired improvisation."

In Weather Bird: Jazz at the Dawn of its Second Century, jazz critic Gary Giddins called the album "a solo recital of unexpected depth and variety," and remarked: "His adaptation of 'Sun Ship,' a stark and rather insubstantial Coltrane fragment, begins with barely a hint of the source material, then proceeds to locate it in the course of deliberate microtonal stages, building to a vigorous peak as if the Coltrane figure had to be earned."

Aaron Steinberg of Jazz Times stated: "As with most nonpiano solo recitals, Trinity demands a lot from its listeners. Taking a structured, composerly [sic] approach to the violin, however, Maneri does make it easier. Rather than focus on sheer technique, Maneri's patient playing focuses on the polyphonic capabilities of his instrument. Bowing two and three notes simultaneously or bowing and plucking at the same time, Maneri often sounds like a string ensemble."

== Track listing ==
All compositions by Mat Maneri except as indicated

1. "Pure Mode" (Matthew Shipp) - 3:54
2. "Almost Pretty" - 4:39
3. "Trinity" - 10:04
4. "Sun Ship" (John Coltrane) - 7:22
5. "Blue Deco" - 8:29
6. "Veiled" - 5:08
7. "Iron Man" (Eric Dolphy) - 3:13
8. "Lattice" (Joe Morris) - 3:22
9. "November 1st" - 10:48
10. "Lady Day's Lament" (Joe Maneri) - 6:47

== Personnel ==
- Mat Maneri – violin, viola
