= Metaphysics: The Lost Atlantic Album =

Studio album by Hasaan Ibn Ali
- Released: April 23, 2021
- Recorded: August 23, September 7, 1965
- Studios: Atlantic Studios, New York City
- Genre: Jazz
- Label: Omnivore

Metaphysics: The Lost Atlantic Album is an album by Hasaan Ibn Ali. His quartet recorded the material on it in 1965 for Atlantic Records, which chose not to release it after he was imprisoned for drugs possession. The master tapes were destroyed in a fire in 1978, and by the time of Ibn Ali's death two years later, his only released recording remained The Max Roach Trio Featuring the Legendary Hasaan from 1964.

A tape copy of the 1965 sessions was long-rumored to exist and was located in 2017. This led to the release of the surviving material by Omnivore Recordings in 2021.

== Background ==
Pianist Hasaan Ibn Ali was given prominent billing on drummer Max Roach's 1964 recording for Atlantic Records, The Max Roach Trio Featuring the Legendary Hasaan. Atlantic then gave Ibn Ali a one-record contract to make an album as leader.

== Recording and music ==
The album was recorded on August 23 and September 7, 1965, at Atlantic Studios in New York City. In addition to Ibn Ali on piano, the other musicians were tenor saxophonist Odean Pope, bassist Art Davis, and drummer Kalil Madi. This was Pope's first recording.

Eight compositions, all by Ibn Ali, were recorded. On "Atlantic Ones", Ibn Ali's "choppy piano opening" contrasts with Pope's smoother playing. "Richard May Love Give Powell" is a ballad for pianist Richie Powell or Bud Powell and is played by Pope in relatively conventional style. "Viceroy" was named after Ibn Ali's favorite brand of cigarette. "El Hasaan" has a 12-bar blues structure, but is played in more than one time signature simultaneously. "True Trane" features Ibn Ali "simultaneously playing two completely different rhythmic ideas with his left and right hands, and Pope's take on [John] Coltrane".

== Release ==
Not long after the sessions, Ibn Ali was imprisoned for possession of drugs and Atlantic decided not to release the recording. The master tapes were then destroyed in a major fire at the label's warehouse in 1978. When Ibn Ali died in 1980, the Roach album was the only released recording of his playing. Rumors persisted that copies of his 'lost' recordings existed, but no progress in finding them was made for decades. Then, in 2017, pianist and author Lewis Porter was asked for help and put Alan Sukoenig, who wrote the liner notes for The Max Roach Trio Featuring the Legendary Hasaan, in contact with producer Patrick Milligan, who had worked on reissuing Atlantic albums. This led to the discovery of a tape copy of the reference acetates near the end of that year.

That tape copy was restored and used to create a new master by audio engineer Michael Graves. One of the eight tracks recorded – "Ad Aspera Ad Astra" – was not on the tape. The surviving seven were augmented by three alternative takes on the resultant album, which was given the title Metaphysics: The Lost Atlantic Album and was released by Omnivore Recordings on April 23, 2021. It was made available as a CD and a double-LP.

== Reception ==
Professional ratings
Review scores
| Source | Rating |
|---|---|
| AllMusic | 5/5 stars |

Duck Baker in The New York City Jazz Record wrote that Metaphysics was a rare instance of a fabled recording more than meeting expectations. Thom Jurek, reviewing for AllMusic, agreed, describing it as "one of modern jazz's great lost albums – the music here is astonishing. Any jazz fan who encounters this work (and all should) will be blessed by the experience." A commentator for Audiophile Review wrote: "It sounds very good with no apparent drop-outs of note, and just a hint of distortion here and there (perhaps from tape saturation or wear on the acetate copy). There is a nice sense of the studio vibe surrounding the band in this Monaural recording."

Metaphysics entered the Billboard Jazz Albums Chart at No. 11 on May 8, 2021.

== Track listing ==
All compositions by Hasaan Ibn Ali.

1. "Atlantic Ones"
2. "Viceroy"
3. "El Hasaan"
4. "Richard May Love Give Powell"
5. "Metaphysics"
6. "Epitome"
7. "True Train"
8. "True Train" [alternative take]
9. "Viceroy" [alternative take]
10. "Atlantic Ones" [alternative take]

== Personnel ==
- Hasaan Ibn Ali – piano
- Odean Pope – tenor saxophone
- Art Davis – bass
- Kalil Madi – drums
