= Lift & Poise =

Studio album by Pandelis Karayorgis, Mat Maneri
- Released: 1998
- Recorded: December 23, 26, 27 & 28, 1996; January 8, 1997
- Studio: Cambridge, Massachusetts
- Genre: Jazz
- Length: 55:11
- Label: Leo
- Producer: Pandelis Karayorgis, Leo Feigin

Pandelis Karayorgis chronology
Lines (1995)	Lift & Poise (1998)	Heart and Sack (1998)

Mat Maneri chronology
Acceptance (1998)	Lift & Poise (1998)	Fifty-One Sorrows (1999)

Lift & Poise, subtitled 12 Improvised Movements, is an album by jazz pianist Pandelis Karayorgis and violinist Mat Maneri, which was recorded between 1996 and 1997 and released on Leo Lab, a sublabel of Leo Records. Karayorgis and Maneri play duo and solo free improvisations, as well as trio improvisations with Joe Maneri on clarinet and John Lockwood on bass. The leaders' two solo pieces take their names from the American painter Cy Twombly and a detail of one of his paintings is on the album's cover.

== Reception ==
Professional ratings
Review scores
Source	Rating
AllMusic	4.5/5 stars
The Penguin Guide to Jazz	3/4 stars

In his review for AllMusic, Steve Loewy states "At times mournful, at others suspenseful, Lift & Poise is a performance that requires concentrated listening... A set to be savored, even cherished."

The Penguin Guide to Jazz notes that "There are 12 tracks, divided into solo, duo and trio pieces, exploring a range of sonorities and improvising languages, ranging from the quasi‑classical to the free‑form and brutalist."

The JazzTimes review by Harvey Pekar says "Much of Lift & Poise contains relaxed, thoughtful and sometimes pointillistic collective improvising. Mat and Karayorgis listen closely to each other, playing in registers that do not conflict; you can hear and follow them easily and they complement each other beautifully."

== Track listing ==
1. "Apollo I" (P. Karayorgis - M. Maneri) – 4:39
2. "In This Language" (P. Karayorgis - M. Maneri, J. Maneri) – 5:14
3. "Apollo II" (P. Karayorgis - M. Maneri) – 1:22
4. "Rotation" (P. Karayorgis, M. Maneri, J. Lockwood) – 3:48
5. "Lift & Poise" (P. Karayorgis, M. Maneri) – 5:12
6. "Twomblying I" (P. Karayorgis) – 3:42
7. "Twomblying II" (M. Maneri) – 6:00
8. "Aspirates" (P. Karayorgis, M. Maneri, J. Lockwood) – 6:18
9. "Apollo III" (P. Karayorgis, M. Maneri) – 3:25
10. "Saying Love" (P. Karayorgis, M. Maneri, J. Maneri) – 3:51
11. "Silent Dog" (P. Karayorgis, M. Maneri, J. Lockwood) – 6:04
12. "Submerged Song" (P. Karayorgis, M. Maneri) – 5:32

== Personnel ==
- Pandelis Karayorgis - piano
- Mat Maneri - violin
- Joe Maneri - clarinet
- John Lockwood - bass
