= Pandelis Karayorgis =

Greek pianist & composer (born 1962)

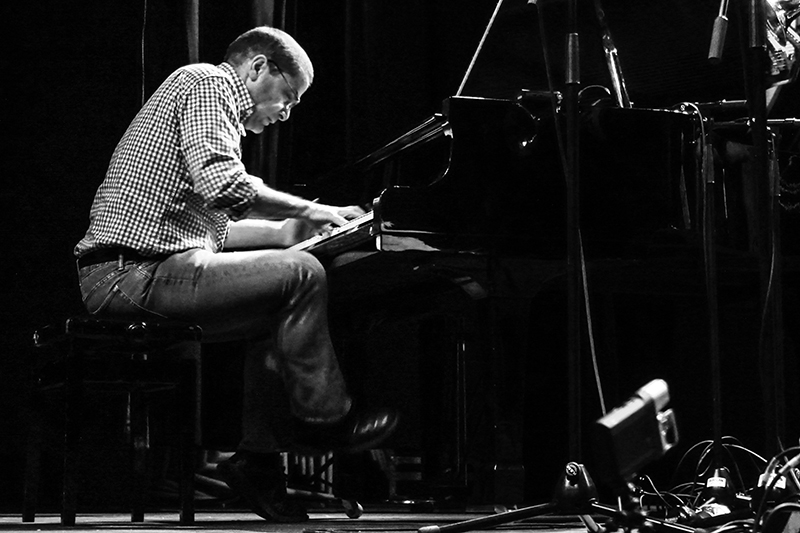

Background information
- Born: 1962 (age 63–64)
- Origin: Athens, Greece
- Genres: Jazz, post-bop, avant-garde jazz
- Occupation: Musician
- Instrument: Piano
- Years active: 1989–present
- Labels: Cadence, Leo, Clean Feed, hatOLOGY, OkkaDisk, Not Two, Driff
- Website: Official Website

Pandelis Karayorgis (born 1962) is a Greek-born and Boston-based pianist, composer and educator.

== Life and career ==
Karayorgis was born in Athens, Greece in 1962. He began classical piano lessons at the age of 9, but by the end of high school he was in love with jazz and beginning to play gigs while pursuing a degree in economics. In 1985, Karayorgis went to Boston to attend the New England Conservatory, where he earned BM and MM degrees in music while studying with Paul Bley, Jimmy Giuffre, George Russell, and Joe Maneri among others.

He studied and performed extensively the music of Thelonious Monk and Lennie Tristano. In the nineties, he worked closely with violinist Mat Maneri producing several recordings mostly in duo format. During the same time, he also co-led a group with Eric Pakula featuring much of the Tristano repertoire, and collaborated with Argentine saxophonist and composer Guillermo Gregorio.

He recorded for labels such as Cadence, Leo, Nuscope, OkkaDisk, Clean Feed, hatOLOGY, Not Two, and Driff, an artist-run label co-founded by Karayorgis and Jorrit Dijkstra. Some of the most extensive recording/performing collaborations have been with Nate McBride, Curt Newton, Luther Gray, Jef Charland, Randy Peterson, Ken Vandermark and Dave Rempis. His projects include the Pandelis Karayorgis Trio, the electric trio mi3, the quartet Construction Party, the quintet System of 5, and the Whammies, a group dedicated to the music of Steve Lacy.

== Discography ==
=== As leader/co-leader ===
Release year	Title	Label	Personnel/Notes
1989	Hand Made	Lyra	
1992	The Other Name	Motive	Solo piano and duos with Mat Maneri (electric violin), Erik Kerr (drums)
1994	In Time	Leo	Duo with Mat Maneri (electric violin)
1994	Between Speech & Song	Cadence	As Pakula/Karayorgis/Rosenthal; Eric Pakula (alto sax), Pandelis Karayorgis (piano), Jonathan Robinson (bass), Eric Rosenthal (drums), guest: Mat Maneri (electric violin)
1995	Lines	Accurate	Quartet co-led by Eric Pakula (alto sax), with Nate McBride, Jonathan Robinson (bass), Eric Rosenthal, John McLellan (drums)
1998	Lift & Poise	Leo	Duo with Mat Maneri (violin), guests: Joe Maneri (clarinet), John Lockwood (bass)
1998	Heart and Sack	Leo	Trio with Nate McBride (bass), Randy Peterson (drums)
2001	Let It	Cadence	Duos and solos with Nate McBride (bass)
2001	No Such Thing	Boxholder	Collaborative trio with Ken Vandermark (clarinet, tenor sax), Nate McBride (bass)
2001	Blood Ballad	Leo	Trio with Nate McBride (bass), Randy Peterson (drums)
2002	Disambiguation	Leo	Quintet co-led by Mat Maneri (violin), with Tony Malaby (tenor sax), Michael Formanek (bass), Randy Peterson (drums)
2004	Seventeen Pieces	Leo	Solo piano
2005	We Will Make a Home for You	Clean Feed	As the mi3; trio with Nate McBride (bass), Curt Newton (drums)
2007	Free Advice	Clean Feed	As the mi3; trio with Nate McBride (bass), Curt Newton (drums)
2007	Chicago Approach	Nuscope	Collaborative trio with Guillermo Gregorio (clarinet), Nate McBride (bass)
2007	Foreground Music	Okka Disk	Duo with Ken Vandermark (tenor sax, clarinet)
2008	Betwixt	hatOLOGY	As the mi3; trio with Nate McBride (bass), Curt Newton (drums)
2011	System of 5	hatOLOGY	Quintet with Matt Langley (tenor sax), Jeff Galindo (trombone), Jef Charland (bass), Luther Gray (drums)
2012	Instruments Of Change	Not Two	As the band Construction Party; quartet with Forbes Graham (trumpet), Dave Rempis (alto sax), Luther Gray (drums)
2013	Window And Doorway	Driff	Collaborative trio with Guillermo Gregorio (clarinet), Steve Swell (trombone)
2013	Circuitous	Driff	Quintet with Dave Rempis (tenor, alto & baritone sax), Keefe Jackson (tenor sax, bass & contrabass clarinet), Nate McBride (bass), Frank Rosaly (drums)
2013	Cocoon	Driff	Trio with Jef Charland (bass), Luther Gray (drums)
2014	Afterimage	Driff	Quintet with Dave Rempis (tenor, alto & baritone sax), Keefe Jackson (tenor sax, bass & contrabass clarinet), Nate McBride (bass), Frank Rosaly (drums)
2015	Matchbox	Driff	As the band Matchbox; quartet with Jorrit Dijkstra (alto sax), Nate McBride (bass), Curt Newton (drums)
2015	Bathysphere	Driff	As the band Bathysphere.

With The Whammies

- The Whammies Play the Music of Steve Lacy (Driff, 2012)
- The Whammies Play the Music of Steve Lacy, Vol. 2 (Driff, 2013)
- The Whammies Play the Music of Steve Lacy, Live Vol. 3 (Driff, 2014)

=== As sideman ===
With Guillermo Gregorio

- Approximately (hatART, 1996)
- Red Cube (hatOLOGY, 1999)
