= In Time (Mat Maneri album) =

Studio album by Mat Maneri, Pandelis Karayorgis,
- Released: 1994
- Recorded: April 9, 10 & 11, 1993
- Studio: Slosberg Auditorium, Brandeis University, Waltham, Massachusetts
- Genre: Jazz
- Length: 62:13
- Label: Leo
- Producer: Pandelis Karayorgis, Leo Feigin

Mat Maneri chronology
In Time (1994)	Fever Bed (1997)

Pandelis Karayorgis chronology
The Other Name (1992)	In Time (1994)	Between Speech & Song (1994)

In Time is an album by jazz violinist Mat Maneri and pianist Pandelis Karayorgis, recorded in 1993 and released on Leo Lab, a sublabel of Leo Records. The album includes six original pieces and two interpretations of Thelonious Monk composition "Ugly Beauty".

== Reception ==
Professional ratings
Review scores
Source	Rating
AllMusic	4/5 stars
The Penguin Guide to Jazz	3/4 stars

In his review for AllMusic, Thom Jurek states: "As a work of restrained beauty and subtle textures and colors, it is nearly a masterpiece... This was an auspicious meeting of two young minds who had already in 1994 established their own voices on a burgeoning jazz improv scene."

The Penguin Guide to Jazz says that the album "is delicately beautiful and thoughtful, almost as a classical duo in timbre and dynamics, but dealing with a language that is far from classical."

== Track listing ==
1. "Ugly Beauty #1" (Thelonious Monk) – 4:40
2. "Speaking" (Pandelis Karayorgis) – 9:31
3. "Savigny Platz" (Mat Maneri) – 8:42
4. "Part III of a Name" (Pandelis Karayorgis) – 6:46
5. "Miranda" (Mat Maneri) – 5:48
6. "In Time" (Pandelis Karayorgis) – 9:29
7. "Blue Seven" (Mat Maneri) – 12:07
8. "Ugly Beauty #2" (Thelonious Monk) – 5:10

== Personnel ==
- Mat Maneri - electric violin
- Pandelis Karayorgis - piano
