= New York, Fall 1974 =

1974 studio album by Anthony Braxton

Studio album by Anthony Braxton
- Released: 1975
- Recorded: September 27 and October 16, 1974
- Studio: Generation Sound Studios, New York
- Genre: Jazz
- Length: 39:20
- Label: Arista
- Producer: Michael Cuscuna

Anthony Braxton chronology
Trio and Duet (1974)	New York, Fall 1974 (1975)	Five Pieces 1975 (1975)

New York, Fall 1974 is an album by the American jazz saxophonist Anthony Braxton, recorded in 1974 and released on the Arista label. The album was subsequently included on The Complete Arista Recordings of Anthony Braxton released by Mosaic Records in 2008.

== Reception ==
The AllMusic review by Scott Yanow awarded the album 4 stars stating, "The wide amount of variety on this set makes this album a perfect introduction to Anthony Braxton's potentially forbidding but logical music."

Professional ratings
Review scores
Source	Rating
Allmusic	4/5 stars
Christgau's Record Guide	B+
The Rolling Stone Jazz Record Guide	5/5 stars

== Track listing ==
All compositions by Anthony Braxton.

1. (Composition 23 B) – 8:50
2. (Composition 23 C) – 3:07
3. (Composition 23 D) – 7:03
4. (Composition 37) – 8:18
5. (Composition 23 A) – 5:29
6. (Composition 38 A) – 6:33

Recorded at Generation Sound Studios in New York on September 27 (tracks 1–5) and October 16 (track 6), 1974

== Personnel ==
- Anthony Braxton – sopranino saxophone, alto saxophone, clarinet, contrabass clarinet, flute
- Kenny Wheeler – trumpet, flugelhorn (tracks 1–3 & 6)
- Dave Holland – double bass (tracks 1–3 & 6)
- Jerome Cooper – drums (tracks 1–3 & 6)
- Richard Teitelbaum – Moog synthesizer (track 4)
- Julius Hemphill – alto saxophone (track 5)
- Oliver Lake – tenor saxophone (track 5)
- Hamiet Bluiett – baritone saxophone (track 5)
- Leroy Jenkins – violin (track 6)
