= Out Right Now =

Live album by Joe Maneri, Joe Morris and Mat Maneri
- Released: 2001
- Recorded: November 5, 1995
- Venue: Loft, Köln, Germany
- Genre: Jazz
- Length: 72:30
- Label: HatOLOGY; 561
- Producer: Werner X. Uehlinger

Joe Maneri chronology
Three Men Walking (1995)	Out Right Now (2001)	In Full Cry (1996)

Out Right Now is a live album by pianist/saxophonist Joe Maneri, guitarist Joe Morris, and violinist Mat Maneri which was recorded in 1993 and released on the HatOLOGY label in 1997.

== Reception ==
Professional ratings
Review scores
Source	Rating
AllMusic	4.5/5 stars

On All About Jazz, Glenn Astarita wrote "The musicians' animated approach and spurious interplay is akin to some sort of domino effect, where the respective soloist's trigger responses from one another. Throughout, the trio expounds upon an abundance of emotionally driven mini-themes, consisting of Morris' articulately executed, fluttering single note lines, Mat Maneri's interrogation of all sonic registers and the band's overall propensity to pursue verbose dialogue amid various odd-metered rhythmic foundations. Hence, the music portrayed here often elicits notions of three scientists delving into a complex mathematical formula".

== Track listing ==
All compositions by Joe Maneri, Joe Morris and Mat Maneri

1. "Some and Then Some" – 26:31
2. "Spoken Things" – 8:24
3. "Small Steps in the Right Direction" – 5:33
4. "Roots Go Deep" – 9:10
5. "Out Right Now" – 15:46
6. "Blue Current" – 7:07

== Personnel ==
- Joe Maneri – alto saxophone, tenor saxophone, piano
- Joe Morris – guitar
- Mat Maneri – violin
