= Angles of Repose =

Studio album by Joe Maneri
- Released: 2004
- Recorded: May 2002
- Studios: Chapelle Sainte Philomène; Puget-Ville, France
- Genre: Jazz
- Length: 71:12
- Labels: ECM; ECM 1862
- Producer: Steve Lake

Joe Maneri chronology
Tales of Rohnlief (1998)	Angles of Repose (2004)	Going to Church (2002)

Angles of Repose is an album by American reed player Joe Maneri with bassist Barre Phillips and violist Mat Maneri recorded in May 2002 and released on ECM in 2004.

== Reception ==
The AllMusic review by Thom Jurek awarded the album 4 stars stating "This music sings. It's true the singing is balladic and dirgelike much of the time, but it is pastoral, too, and gentle and sweetly elegiac. It bears repeated listening and meets the listener readily, offering a standard-bearing effectiveness in how the poetry of collective improvisation should be realized and articulated."

Professional ratings
Review scores
Source	Rating
Allmusic	4/5 stars
The Penguin Guide to Jazz Recordings	3/4 stars

== Track listing ==
All compositions by Joe Maneri, Mat Maneri and Barre Phillips except as indicated

1. "Angles of Repose No. 1" – 4:44
2. "Angles of Repose No. 2" – 7:39
3. "Angles of Repose No. 3" (Joe Maneri) – 3:28
4. "Angles of Repose No. 4" – 10:10
5. "Angles of Repose No. 5" (Mat Maneri, Barre Phillips) – 6:41
6. "Angles of Repose No. 6" – 9:33
7. "Angles of Repose No. 7" – 1:08
8. "Angles of Repose No. 8" – 2:32
9. "Angles of Repose No. 9" – 15:38
10. "Angles of Repose No. 10" – 9:39

== Personnel ==
- Joe Maneri – clarinet, alto saxophone, tenor saxophone
- Barre Phillips – double bass
- Mat Maneri – viola
