= Splitting Image (Les Diaboliques album) =

1997 live improvisation album

Live album by Les Diaboliques (Irène Schweizer, Maggie Nicols, and Joëlle Léandre)
- Released: 1997
- Recorded: November 7 and 8, 1994
- Venue: Rote Fabrik, Zürich
- Genre: Free improvisation
- Length: 52:59
- Label: Intakt; CD 048
- Producer: Patrik Landolt

Les Diaboliques chronology
Les Diaboliques (1994)	Splitting Image (1997)	Live At The Rhinefalls (2000)

Splitting Image is a live album by the free improvisation trio Les Diaboliques, featuring pianist Irène Schweizer, vocalist Maggie Nicols, and double bassist Joëlle Léandre. It was recorded on November 7 and 8, 1994, at Rote Fabrik in Zürich, and was released in 1997 by Intakt Records.

== Reception ==
Professional ratings
Review scores
Source	Rating
All About Jazz	4/5 stars
AllMusic	4.5/5 stars
The Penguin Guide to Jazz	3/4 stars
Tom Hull – on the Web	B

In a review for AllMusic, Thom Jurek stated that the musicians "are virtually incapable, as individuals or as a trio, of spitting out the sort of ill-defined twaddle that many groups of individuals do when they get together impromptu like this," and wrote: "This is more than impressive; this is an event."

The authors of The Penguin Guide to Jazz Recordings called the album "intriguing," and noted that "the level of interaction is as close and responsive as one might wish."

Glenn Astarita of All About Jazz commented: "this trio delve into highly conversational interaction while purveying an overall sense of melodrama... Splitting Image is magnificent, beguiling and brimming with vivid imagery as it elicits thoughts of an off-Broadway play – complete with hefty doses of theatrical mannerisms, portrayed through music and lyric. Recommended."

== Track listing ==
Composed by Irène Schweizer, Maggie Nicols, and Joëlle Léandre

1. "Helas!" – 3:49
2. "Uncle Peter" – 1:48
3. "The Whole World" – 2:42
4. "Bring Out Your Dead" – 1:07
5. "Molto Strano" – 2:34
6. "Stevens' Game" – 4:01
7. "In a Balladesque Mood" – 4:13
8. "Splitting Image" – 2:03
9. "Two Waves" – 3:54
10. "Silly Boy" – 3:57
11. "Who is Adam?" – 6:08
12. "The Very Last Tango" – 2:36
13. "Little Nicols" – 2:23
14. "Infinite Diversity" – 5:10
15. "Quifecit" – 4:35
16. "Valse Diabolique II" – 2:07

== Personnel ==
- Irene Schweizer – piano
- Maggie Nicols – voice
- Joëlle Léandre – double bass
