= Tales of Rohnlief =

Studio album by Joe Maneri
- Released: 1999
- Recorded: June 1998
- Genre: Jazz
- Length: 64:54
- Label: ECM; ECM 1678
- Producer: Steve Lake

Joe Maneri chronology
The Trio Concerts (1997)	Tales of Rohnlief (1999)	Angles of Repose (2002)

Tales of Rohnlief is an album by the American jazz reed player composer Joe Maneri, recorded in June 1998 and released on ECM the following year. The trio features bassist Barre Phillips and violinist Mat Maneri.

== Reception ==
Professional ratings
Review scores
Source	Rating
AllMusic	3/5 stars
The Penguin Guide to Jazz Recordings	3/4 stars

The AllMusic review by Dave Lynch stated: "Tales of Rohnlief is music for the adventurous listener with time to savor its subtleties. But those with ears tuned to more conventional musical rules should still find plenty of beauty, warmth, and even humor in this recording."

== Track listing ==
All compositions by Joe Maneri, Mat Maneri and Barre Phillips except as indicated

1. "Rohnlief" (Joe Maneri, Barre Phillips) – 8:34
2. "A Long Way from Home" (Joe Maneri, Phillips) – 13:08
3. "Sunned" (Mat Maneri) 3:30
4. "When the Ship Went Down" – 7:02
5. "The Aftermath" (Mat Maneri, Phillips) – 3:28
6. "Bonewith" – 5:43
7. "Flaull Clon Sleare" (Joe Maneri) – 2:36
8. "Hold the Tiger" – 1:51
9. "Canzone di Peppe" – 3:28
10. "The Field" – 3:18
11. "Nelgat" – 4:07
12. "Elma My Dear" (Joe Maneri, Phillips) – 3:23
13. "Third Hand" (Mat Maneri) – 2:02
14. "Pilvetslednah" (Joe Maneri) – 2:44

== Personnel ==
- Joe Maneri – clarinet, alto and tenor saxophones, piano, voice
- Barre Phillips – double bass
- Mat Maneri – electric 6 string violin, baritone violin
