= Blessed (Joe Maneri album) =

Studio album by Joe Maneri / Mat Maneri
- Released: 1998
- Recorded: October 1997
- Studio: Hardstudios; Winterthur, Switzerland
- Genre: Jazz
- Length: 63:37
- Label: ECM; ECM 1661
- Producer: Steve Lake

Joe Maneri chronology
In Full Cry (1996)	Blessed (1998)	The Trio Concerts (1997)

Blessed is an album by the American jazz reed player Joe Maneri, with his son, violinist Mat Maneri, recorded in October 1997 and released on ECM the following year.

== Reception ==
The AllMusic review by Thom Jurek stated: "It has within it the basis of a new study of harmonic improvisation, and a manner of execution and construction that show respect and tenderness not only toward one another as family, but to the music they approach with the sole intention of changing it from the inside out. Blessed is remarkable for its close dancing with the infinite."

Professional ratings
Review scores
Source	Rating
AllMusic	4/5 stars
The Penguin Guide to Jazz Recordings	3/4 stars

== Track listing ==
All compositions by Joe Maneri and Mat Maneri except as indicated

1. "At the Gate" – 3:53
2. "There Are No Doors" – 4:22
3. "Sixty-One Joys" (Mat Maneri) – 4:01
4. "From Loosened Soil" – 11:05
5. "Five Fantasies" – 5:36
6. "Never Said a Mumblin' Word" (Traditional) – 5:38
7. "Is Nothing Near?" – 9:03
8. "Body and Soul" (Frank Eyton, Johnny Green, Edward Heyman, Robert Sour) – 6:16
9. "Race You Home" – 1:12
10. "Gardenias for Gardenis" (Joe Maneri) – 1:42
11. "Outside the Whole Thing" – 5:36
12. "Blessed" (Mat Maneri) – 5:05

== Personnel ==
- Joe Maneri – clarinet, alto saxophone, tenor saxophone, piano
- Mat Maneri – violin, electric 6 string violin, baritone violin, electric 5-string viola
