= The Flow of X =

Studio album by Matthew Shipp
- Released: 1997
- Recorded: May 14, 1995
- Studio: Seltzer Sound, New York City
- Genre: Jazz
- Length: 48:49
- Label: 2.13.61
- Producer: Matthew Shipp

Matthew Shipp chronology
2-Z (1996)	The Flow of X (1997)	Before the World (1997)

The Flow of X is an album by the American jazz pianist Matthew Shipp, recorded in 1995 and released on the 2.13.61 label. It features a quartet with violinist Mat Maneri, bassist William Parker and drummer Whit Dickey, the same lineup as the previous album Critical Mass. The liner notes include a piece by Shipp comparing boxing and jazz.

== Reception ==
Professional ratings
Review scores
Source	Rating
AllMusic	3/5 stars
The Penguin Guide to Jazz	3/4 stars
(The New) Rolling Stone Album Guide	3.5/5 stars

In his review for AllMusic, Charlie Wilmoth states that "Shipp plays rich, low-register chords and more acrobatic lines like a slightly more sedate Cecil Taylor." The JazzTimes review by Josef Woodard notes that "this music is all about flow, the flow of dialogue and moods between sentient musicians and the flow of music with a decidedly free will."

== Track listing ==
All compositions by Matthew Shipp

1. "Flow of X" – 5:49
2. "Flow of Silence" – 6:12
3. "Flow of Y" – 7:43
4. "Flow of M" – 6:52
5. "Flow of U" – 9:33
6. "Instinctive Codes" – 12:40

== Personnel ==
- Matthew Shipp – piano
- Mat Maneri – violin
- William Parker – bass
- Whit Dickey – drums
