= Dream Libretto =

Studio album by Marilyn Crispell, Tanya Kalmanovitch, and Richard Teitelbaum
- Released: 2018
- Recorded: 2018
- Studio: Nevessa Production, Woodstock, New York
- Genre: Free jazz
- Label: Leo Records; CD LR 849

Dream Libretto is an album by pianist Marilyn Crispell, violinist Tanya Kalmanovitch, and electronic musician Richard Teitelbaum. It was recorded at Nevessa Production in Woodstock, New York in 2018, and was released by Leo Records that same year. The album features a five-part composition by Crispell titled "Memoria / For Pessa Malka," with all three players participating, followed by a seven-part set of improvised violin/piano duets titled "The River."

== Reception ==
Professional ratings
Review scores
Source	Rating
DownBeat	4/5 stars
All About Jazz	3.5/5 stars

In a review for DownBeat, Tamar Sella stated that, on the album, the "musicians mold a temporary sonic realm of the unconscious, and traverse through it with dedication and curiosity." Regarding "Memoria / For Pessa Malka," she wrote: "This is a sonically rich and textured reality... The narratives within the pieces are miraculous nonlinear threads of the unconscious, unfolding gently to offer inexplicable turns or to fade into darkness." Concerning "The River," Sella commented: "Kalmanovitch and Crispell respond to the richness of the mournful dreamspace unfolded before them with a playful calmness, exploring whispers, silences and stillness."

Writing for All About Jazz, Glenn Astarita referred to the album as "an endearing musical statement, where [Crispell] and her cohorts execute a requiem framed on improvisations and succinct melodies based on the pianist's close friends and family who have passed on."

Ken Waxman, in a review for The Whole Note, noted that the album "deals with loss and regeneration," and how its overall arc serves to "outline how grief can lead to musical artistry."

In a review for Jazz Weekly, George W. Harris wrote that the album is "strong on intuitive communication."

== Track listing ==
=== Memoria / For Pessa Malka (Crispell) ===
1. "I" – 6:41
2. "II" – 5:27
3. "III" – 3:22
4. "IV" – 4:16
5. "V" – 5:04

=== The River (Crispell/Kalmanovitch) ===
6. "Climb to a Whisper" – 2:49
7. "Unburying the Silences" – 3:04
8. "Dark Reflection" – 2:15
9. "Where Water Moves" – 4:29
10. "Stones Remain Still" – 4:11
11. "Walked Through to Sleep" – 3:17
12. "Stars Visible and Invisible" – 2:56

== Personnel ==
- Marilyn Crispell – piano
- Tanya Kalmanovitch – violin
- Richard Teitelbaum – electronics (tracks 1 – 5)
