= Betwixt (album) =

Album by jazz pianist Pandelis Karayorgis

Studio album by Pandelis Karayorgis
- Released: 2008
- Recorded: December 13 & 14, 2006; Kimchee Records, Cambridge, Massachusetts
- Genre: Jazz
- Length: 65:45
- Label: hatOLOGY
- Producers: Karayorgis, McBride, Newton

Pandelis Karayorgis chronology
Free Advice (2007)	Betwixt (2008)	System of 5 (2011)

Betwixt is an album by jazz pianist Pandelis Karayorgis, which was recorded in 2006 and released on the Swiss hatOLOGY label. It was the third recording by mi3, a trio with bassist Nate McBride and drummer Curt Newton.

== Music ==
For this program, Karayorgis plays Fender Rhodes, enhancing its sound with the addition of a mutron (a synthetizer-like sound filter once endorsed by Stevie Wonder), distortion pedal, and ring modulator (a favorite of Karlheinz Stockhausen, which blends sound signals into dissimilar, often dissonant, frequencies). The setlist includes readings of pieces by Thelonious Monk, Sun Ra, Duke Ellington, Hasaan Ibn Ali, Misha Mengelberg and Wayne Shorter, along with three of the pianist's originals.

== Reception ==
Professional ratings
Review scores
Source	Rating
Down Beat	4/5 stars

The Down Beat review by John Corbett notes that "The Greek-born Bostonian Pandelis Karayorgis is not without his funky edges on the amped keyboard, but his method isn't to put down kitschy grooves or create a sexy '70s fusion ambiance. In his hands, and with his wonderful trio, the Rhodes is transformed into a versatile, gritty, pitch-based electronic sound generator--a perfect free-bop tool."

The All About Jazz by Chris May states "Betwixt could easily have been a freak show—and there's no denying its novelty appeal—but it's much more than that. Karayorgis' new sonic and textural peregrinations are as substantial as his acoustic piano playing, and he's robustly supported by bassist Nate McBride and drummer Curt Newton. Already compelling on this first flush, it's a direction worthy of further exploration."

In another review for All About Jazz Troy Collins says "Free Advice was a welcome reminder of Karayorgis' abilities in a traditional acoustic setting. Betwixt reveals him as a sonic architect of the highest order, a visionary improviser whose enthusiasm for the possibilities of sound knows no limit. Together, Karayorgis, McBride and Newton offer a thrilling set guaranteed to turn heads."

== Track listing ==
1. "Green Chimneys" (Thelonious Monk) – 6:25
2. "Saturn" (Sun Ra) – 9:00
3. "Break Even" (Pandelis Karayorgis) – 8:09
4. "Heaven" (Duke Ellington) – 3:06
5. "Betwixt" (Pandelis Karayorgis) – 4:52
6. "Hypochristmutreefuzz" (Misha Mengelberg) – 4:15
7. "Pinocchio" (Wayne Shorter) – 4:16
8. "Brake's Sake" (Thelonious Monk) – 6:35
9. "Light Blue" (Thelonious Monk) – 3:27
10. "Curt's Escape" (Pandelis Karayorgis) – 6:15
11. "Off My Back Jack" (Hasaan Ibn Ali) – 5:57
12. "Hump" (Thelonious Monk) – 5:58

== Personnel ==
- Pandelis Karayorgis - Fender Rhodes
- Nate McBride - bass
- Curt Newton - drums
