= Three Men Walking =

Studio album by Maneri/Morris/Maneri
- Released: 1996
- Recorded: October/November 1995
- Studio: Hardstudios; Winterthur, Switzerland
- Genre: Jazz
- Length: 66:20
- Label: ECM; ECM 1597
- Producer: Steve Lake

Joe Maneri chronology
Let the Horse Go (1995)	Three Men Walking (1996)	Out Right Now (1995)

Three Men Walking is an album by American jazz reed player and composer Joe Maneri recorded in October and November 1995 and released on ECM the following year. The trio features guitarist Joe Morris and violinist Mat Maneri.

== Reception ==
The AllMusic review by Stacia Proefrock awarded the album 4 stars stating "The music here is radically creative without being inaccessible, a beautiful example of innovation in jazz."

Professional ratings
Review scores
Source	Rating
AllMusic	4/5 stars
The Penguin Guide to Jazz Recordings	4/4 stars

== Track listing ==
All tracks by Joe Maneri, Joe Morris and Mat Maneri, except as noted.

1. "Calling" (Joe Maneri) - 3:15
2. "What's New?" (Johnny Burke, Bob Haggart) - 9:47
3. "Bird's in the Belfry" - 6:54
4. "If Not Now" (Morris) - 3:22
5. "Let Me Tell You" - 2:04
6. "Through a Glass Darkly" - 4:58
7. "Three Men Walking" - 5:24
8. "Deep Paths" - 9:16
9. "Diuturnal" (Joe Maneri) - 3:34
10. "Fevered" - 5:40
11. "Gestalt" (Joe Maneri) - 2:40
12. "To Anne's Eyes" (Morris) - 2:07
13. "Arc and Point" - 5:06
14. "For Josef Schmid" (Joe Maneri) - 2:09

== Personnel ==
- Joe Maneri – clarinet, alto and tenor saxophones, piano
- Joe Morris – electric guitar
- Mat Maneri – electric 6 string violin
