= DMG @ The Stone Volume 1 =

2008 live album

DMG @ The Stone Volume 1: December 22, 2006

Live album by Joëlle Léandre, Roy Campbell, Marilyn Crispell, and Mat Maneri
- Released: 2008
- Recorded: December 22, 2006
- Venues: The Stone, New York City
- Genre: Free improvisation
- Length: 53:27
- Labels: DMG/ARC; 0721
- Producer: Bruce Lee Gallanter

DMG @ The Stone Volume 1: December 22, 2006 is a live album by the Stone Quartet: bassist Joëlle Léandre, trumpeter and flutist Roy Campbell, pianist Marilyn Crispell, and violist Mat Maneri. It was recorded on December 22, 2006, at The Stone in New York City, and was released in 2008 by the Downtown Music Gallery's DMG/ARC label.

== Reception ==
Professional ratings
Review scores
Source	Rating
The Free Jazz Collective	5/5 stars
Tom Hull – on the Web	B+

A reviewer for The Free Jazz Collective awarded the album a full five stars, and stated: "The four musicians... feel like like-minded spirits on this free and open album, full of slow and intimistic harmonic confrontations between their four instruments. The slowness of their hesitatingly exploring of and expanding on the created sounds gives a rather accessible listen, with hauntingly beautiful parts in it."

Kurt Gottschalk of All About Jazz wrote: "The playing is strong throughout, but it's particularly nice to hear Campbell pull back. He plays flute for part of the set, but his muted trumpet sounds especially sweet against the woody lyricism of the rest of the band."

Point of Departure's Francesco Martinelli commented: "The instrumentation is chamber-like, especially when Campbell plays flute, but the opening and closing quartet tracks... build up tension and energy, with Léandre getting as close as in any other recordings in her career to a kind of 'jazzy' rhythmic feel."

== Track listing ==
Composed by Joëlle Léandre, Roy Campbell, Marilyn Crispell, and Mat Maneri.

1. "Part 1" – 25:36
2. "Part 2" – 6:54
3. "Part 3" – 7:51
4. "Part 4" – 13:06

== Personnel ==
- Joëlle Léandre – double bass
- Roy Campbell – trumpet, flute
- Marilyn Crispell – piano
- Mat Maneri – viola
