= Coming Down the Mountain (album) =

Studio album by Joe Maneri Quartet
- Released: 1997
- Recorded: October 28, 1993
- Venue: Ruach Israel, Needham, Massachusetts
- Genre: Jazz
- Length: 54:12
- Label: HatOLOGY; 501
- Producer: Joe Maneri, Mat Maneri, Pia Uehlinger, Werner X. Uehlinger

Joe Maneri chronology
Dahabenzapple (1993)	Coming Down the Mountain (1993)	Let the Horse Go (1995)

Coming Down the Mountain is an album by the pianist, saxophonist and composer Joe Maneri, recorded in 1993 and released on the HatOLOGY label in 1997.

== Reception ==
Professional ratings
Review scores
Source	Rating
AllMusic	4/5 stars

In JazzTimes, John Murph wrote: "Microtonal master, Joe Maneri upholds free jazz’s basic principles in the highest regards by foregoing annotated compositions, which forces his musicians to rely on intuitive improvisation and group empathy. As Coming Down The Mountain attests, the results can be surprisingly tranquil, especially when the musicians opt for silence and elongated contours instead of the usual bag of overpowering dissonance ... Coming Down The Mountain is yet another fine recording by Maneri".

== Track listing ==
All compositions by Joe Maneri

1. "Swing High" – 6:20
2. "Swing Higher" – 11:04
3. "Coming Down the Mountain" – 11:23
4. "Joe's Alto" – 1:49
5. "Say It All" – 15:07
6. "To End or Not to End?" – 8:29

== Personnel ==
- Joe Maneri – piano, reeds
- Mat Maneri – violin
- Ed Schuller – bass
- Randy Peterson – drums
