= Trio and Duet =

Studio album by Anthony Braxton
- Released: 1974
- Recorded: October 8, 1974
- Studio: Thunder Sound in Toronto, Canada
- Genre: Jazz
- Length: 45:28
- Label: Sackville 3007
- Producer: Bill Smith

Anthony Braxton chronology
Royal Volume 1 (1974)	Trio and Duet (1974)	New York, Fall 1974 (1974)

Trio and Duet is an album by American jazz saxophonist Anthony Braxton recorded in 1974 and released on the Canadian Sackville label. The album features a trio performance of one of Braxton's compositions and three duets on jazz standards. It was reissued in 2015 by Delmark Records, which purchased the catalog of the Sackville label, with two bonus tracks.

== Reception ==
Professional ratings
Review scores
Source	Rating
Allmusic	4/5 stars
All About Jazz	4/5 stars
The Rolling Stone Jazz Record Guide	4/5 stars
The Penguin Guide to Jazz Recordings	3.5/4 stars

The Allmusic review by Scott Yanow awarded the album 4 stars stating "This is a well-rounded album that features the remarkable Anthony Braxton in two separate settings. ...Recommended". The album was reissued in 2015 and received many accolades. Troy Collins noted on All About Jazz that "Among the many historically important and innovative recordings Braxton made in the 1970s, Trio and Duet stands out as a major signifier of his all-encompassing, artistic vision". In JazzTimes Michael J. West wrote "Forty years later, 1974’s Trio and Duet remains one of Anthony Braxton’s best albums. If anything, it’s even more compelling today because of its weight in Braxtonian history".

== Track listing ==
All compositions by Anthony Braxton except where noted.

1. "Composition 36: HM 421 (RTS) 47" - 19:13
2. "The Song Is You" (Oscar Hammerstein II, Jerome Kern) - 11:49
3. "Embraceable You" (George Gershwin, Ira Gershwin) - 5:47
4. "You Go to My Head" (J. Fred Coots, Haven Gillespie) - 8:39

bonus tracks (Delmark CD reissue)

5. "On Green Dolphin Street" (Bronisław Kaper, Ned Washington) - 11:05
6. "I Remember You" (Victor Schertzinger, Johnny Mercer) - 7:58

== Personnel ==
- Anthony Braxton - alto saxophone, clarinet, contrabass clarinet, chimes, bass drum
- Leo Smith - trumpet, flugelhorn, pocket trumpet, percussion, small instruments (track 1)
- Richard Teitelbaum - Moog synthesizer, percussion (track 1)
- Dave Holland - bass (tracks 2–6)
