= Dahabenzapple =

Live album by Joe Maneri Quartet
- Released: 1996
- Recorded: May 4, 1993
- Venue: Jordan Hall, Boston, Massachusetts
- Genre: Jazz
- Length: 66:20
- Label: hat ART; CD 61881
- Producer: Pia Uehlinger, Werner X. Uehlinger

Joe Maneri chronology
| Tenderly (1993) | Dahabenzapple (1993) | Coming Down the Mountain (1993) |

Dahabenzapple is a live album by pianist, saxophonist and composer Joe Maneri which was recorded in 1993 and released on the HatOLOGY label in 1997.

Professional ratings
Review scores
| Source | Rating |
|---|---|
| AllMusic | 3/5 stars |

== Track listing ==
All compositions by Joe Maneri

1. "Dahabenzapple" – 20:56
2. "The Love You're Giving Us" – 21:33
3. "Dedication" – 23:52

== Personnel ==
- Joe Maneri – piano, reeds
- Mat Maneri – violin
- Cecil McBee – bass
- Randy Peterson – drums
