= Circuitous =

Studio album by Pandelis Karayorgis
- Released: 2013
- Recorded: January 16, 2012
- Studios: Chicago Public Media, Chicago
- Genre: Jazz
- Length: 61:08
- Label: Driff

Pandelis Karayorgis chronology
Window And Doorway (2013)	Circuitous (2013)	Cocoon (2013)

Circuitous is an album by jazz pianist Pandelis Karayorgis, which was recorded in 2012 and released on Driff, an artist-run label co-founded by Karayorgis and Jorrit Dijkstra. He leads a new band with four Chicago-based musicians: saxophonists Dave Rempis and Keefe Jackson, bassist Nate McBride and drummer Frank Rosaly. Karayorgis explains that Tony Williams' seminal album Spring inspired the instrumentation for this project, a quintet with two tenors as the main horns.

== Reception ==
Professional ratings
Review scores
Source	Rating
Down Beat	4/5 stars

In a double review for Down Beat Josef Woodard notes that "the Chicago-based quintet steers perceptions toward comparisons to classic jazz quintet paradigm, different in form and function though it may be."

The All About Jazz review by Glenn Astarita states "Never one to run short on creative sparks, the pianist is a sly arranger, and these works are asymmetrically synched within organization and improvisation. Moreover, several of these pieces are influenced by Thelonious Monk, primarily from an unconventional rhythmic standpoint amid odd-metered expressionism."

The Point of Departure review by Troy Collins says "Karayorgis' Chicago quintet offers an intriguing alternative to his Boston-based ensemble, System Of 5. Similar, but distinct from its East Coast counterpart, the lineup documented on Circuitous explores territory consistent with Karayorgis' oeuvre, which demonstrates a masterful reinvention of post-bop vernacular, expertly balancing the accessibility of the mainstream with the vitalizing freedom of the avant-garde."

== Track listing ==
All compositions by Pandelis Karayorgis

1. "Undertow" – 6:04
2. "Nudge" – 6:30
3. "Swarm" – 9:37
4. "Circuitous" – 5:30
5. "Vortex" – 8:52
6. "Evenfall" – 4:36
7. "Blue Line" – 9:15
8. "Here in July" – 5:18
9. "Souvenir" – 5:26

== Personnel ==
- Dave Rempis – tenor sax, alto sax, baritone sax
- Keefe Jackson – tenor sax, bass clarinet, contrabass clarinet
- Pandelis Karayorgis – piano
- Nate McBride – bass
- Frank Rosaly – drums
