= Speak, Brother, Speak! =

Live album by Max Roach
- Released: 1963
- Recorded: October 27, 1962
- Venue: The Jazz Workshop, San Francisco, California
- Genre: Jazz
- Length: 45:33
- Label: Fantasy; LP 6007

Max Roach chronology
| The Charles Mingus Quintet & Max Roach (1963) | Speak, Brother, Speak! (1963) | The Max Roach Trio featuring the Legendary Hasaan (1964) |

Speak, Brother, Speak! is a live album by American jazz drummer Max Roach featuring performances recorded in San Francisco in 1962 and released by the Fantasy label.

== Reception ==
Professional ratings
Review scores
| Source | Rating |
|---|---|
| Allmusic | 3/5 stars |
| Down Beat | 3/5 stars |
| The Penguin Guide to Jazz Recordings | 3.5/4 stars |
| Tom Hull | A− |

Allmusic awarded the album 3 stars stating: "The music is somewhere between hard bop and the avant-garde, and the musicians really push each other, although the results are not quite essential. Clifford Jordan fans in particular will find this to be an interesting set".

== Track listing ==
All compositions by Max Roach except as indicated

1. "Speak, Brother, Speak" (Clifford Jordan, Eddie Khan, Max Roach, Mal Waldron) - 25:03
2. "A Variation" - 20:30

== Personnel ==
- Max Roach - drums
- Clifford Jordan - tenor saxophone
- Mal Waldron - piano
- Eddie Khan - bass
