= Cocoon (Pandelis Karayorgis album) =

Studio album by Pandelis Karayorgis
- Released: 2013
- Recorded: June 20, 2012
- Studios: Fraser Performance WGBH, Boston
- Genre: Jazz
- Length: 60:37
- Label: Driff

Pandelis Karayorgis chronology
Circuitous (2013)	Cocoon (2013)	The Whammies Play the Music of Steve Lacy, Vol. 2 (2013)

Cocoon is an album by jazz pianist Pandelis Karayorgis, which was recorded in 2012 and released on Driff, an artist-run label co-founded by Karayorgis and Jorrit Dijkstra. It was the debut recording of his trio with bassist Jef Charland and drummer Luther Gray.

== Reception ==
The All About Jazz review by Mark Corroto states "Karayorgis' music is a blotter for the music of Herbie Nichols, Thelonious Monk, and Andrew Hill. Like these skilled innovators, the signature on these compositions (six out of ten here) is his explanation of swing. The pianist combines the playfulness of Alexander von Schlippenbach with the physicality of Don Pullen to create a slightly unbalanced sound."

The Point of Departure review by Troy Collins says "Subtly recalling past antecedents in their vanguard reinterpretations of classic piano trio tenets, Karayorgis' longstanding partnership with Charland and Gray has merited widespread critical acclaim; Cocoon is a certifiable document of their enduring, congenial rapport."

== Track listing ==
All compositions by Pandelis Karayorgis except as indicated

1. "Cocoon" – 5:37
2. "Downed" (Gray) – 6:48
3. "Idiosynchronicity" (Charland) – 4:35
4. "You Took My Coffee and Left" – 5:12
5. "Sideways Glance" – 5:46
6. "Settling" – 9:37
7. "Red" – 5:54
8. "Hopscotch" (Charland) – 4:04
9. "Jabberwocky" (Gray) – 6:46
10. "Incandescent" – 6:18

== Personnel ==
- Pandelis Karayorgis - piano
- Jef Charland - bass
- Luther Gray - drums
