= System of 5 =

Studio album by Pandelis Karayorgis
- Released: 2011
- Recorded: June 10, 2008
- Studio: Firehouse 12, New Haven
- Genre: Jazz
- Length: 53:16
- Label: hatOLOGY
- Producer: Pandelis Karayorgis

Pandelis Karayorgis chronology
Betwixt (2008)	System of 5 (2011)	Instruments Of Change (2012)

System of 5 is an album by jazz pianist Pandelis Karayorgis, which was recorded in 2008 and released on the Swiss hatOLOGY label. It was the debut recording of a new quintet with saxophonist Matt Langley, trombonist Jeff Galindo, bassist Jef Charland and drummer Luther Gray.

== Reception ==
The All About Jazz review by Glenn Astarita states "The ensemble skirts the free side of matters, but the pianist's compositions are designed with structure. This is not another formulaic post-bop extravaganza, however; Karayorgis and the soloists weave between geometric-like architectures, amid a distinct sense of expressionism."

In another review for All About Jazz Troy Collins says "Expertly negotiating the tenuous divide between inside and outside traditions, System Of 5 is one of Karayorgis' most compelling releases—a stirring session that subtly expands upon the historical jazz continuum, inspired by the lessons of the past."

== Track listing ==
All compositions by Pandelis Karayorgis

1. "Transit" – 8:00
2. "Two-ophony" – 7:45
3. "Elastic" – 9:35
4. "Seventh Wonder" – 6:32
5. "Curt's Scape" – 4:13
6. "Stray Line" – 3:38
7. "Due East" – 7:31
8. "Tones Not Notes" – 5:58

== Personnel ==
- Matt Langley - soprano sax, tenor sax
- Jeff Galindo - trombone
- Pandelis Karayorgis - piano
- Jef Charland - bass
- Luther Gray - drums
