= Seventeen Pieces =

Studio album by Pandelis Karayorgis
- Released: 2004
- Recorded: April 2004
- Studio: WGBH studios, Boston
- Genre: Jazz
- Length: 60:30
- Label: Leo
- Producer: Pandelis Karayorgis, Leo Feigin

Pandelis Karayorgis chronology
Disambiguation (2002)	Seventeen Pieces (2004)	We Will Make a Home for You (2005)

Seventeen Pieces is the first solo album by jazz pianist Pandelis Karayorgis, which was recorded in 2004 and released on the English Leo label. With the exception of one track ("Fink Sink Tink"), the remaining sixteen all are pieces he has recorded and performed with other musicians.

== Reception ==
Professional ratings
Review scores
Source	Rating
AllMusic	4/5 stars
The Penguin Guide to Jazz	4/4 stars

In his review for AllMusic, Stewart Mason states "Karayorgis ignores standard rhythms almost entirely on these songs, interspersing long legato phrases, brief passages of near-silence, and sudden bursts of musical energy that suggest a piano version of John Coltrane's sheets of sound approach."

The Penguin Guide to Jazz says that "Karayorgis has developed a powerful piano language of his own and this is its definitive statement to date."

The Exclaim! review by Nate Dorward states "The teasing, elusive nature of the music can sometimes verge on coyness, but there’s no doubt that Karayorgis is a true original. Seventeen Pieces is an album with the devious, glimmering weightlessness of a spider web."

== Track listing ==
All compositions by Pandelis Karayorgis except as indicated

1. "In the Cracks of Four" – 1:46
2. "Straight Blues" – 4:51
3. "Ugly Beauty" (Thelonious Monk) – 4:02
4. "Criss Cross" (Thelonious Monk) – 2:26
5. "Baby" (Lennie Tristano) – 3:53
6. "Background Music" (Warne Marsh) – 2:34
7. "Blood Ballad" – 3:32
8. "Disambiguation" – 4:14
9. "Home" – 3:18
10. "Super Bronze" (Sun Ra) – 3:14
11. "Centennial" – 4:50
12. "Gazzelloni" (Eric Dolphy) – 2:55
13. "Prelude to a Kiss" (Duke Ellington) – 2:51
14. "Fink Sink Tink" – 4:41
15. "I Don't Stand a Ghost of a Chance with You" (Victor Young) – 3:52
16. "Just You, Just Me" (Greer/Klages) – 3:04
17. "Summer" – 4:27

== Personnel ==
- Pandelis Karayorgis - piano
