= Joëlle Léandre Project =

Live album by Joëlle Léandre
- Released: 2000
- Recorded: January 16, 1999
- Venue: Sons d'Hiver, Le Kremlin-Bicêtre, France
- Genre: Free jazz
- Length: 46:14
- Label: Leo Records; CD LR 287
- Producer: Leo Feigin

Joëlle Léandre Project is a live album by bassist Joëlle Léandre. It was recorded in January 1999 at Sons d'Hiver in Le Kremlin-Bicêtre, France, and was released in 2000 by Leo Records. On the album, Léandre is joined by pianist Marilyn Crispell, drummer Paul Lovens, electronic musician Richard Teitelbaum, and violinist Carlos Zingaro.

== Reception ==
Professional ratings
Review scores
Source	Rating
AllMusic	5/5 stars
The Penguin Guide to Jazz	3.5/4 stars

In a review for AllMusic, Glenn Astarita called the ensemble "a multinational, all-star entourage of forward thinking and like-minded improvisers," and wrote: "The band often pursues vertical movement in concert with curiously interesting dialogue as they create grooves and motifs that announce a distinct sense of urgency atop temperate crosscurrents... Joelle Leandre Project is a relatively strong outing, teeming with impassioned interplay and abstract thematic invention."

The authors of the Penguin Guide to Jazz Recordings stated: "Past associations with all these players guarantee a strong empathy and... she has a partner of equal force and expression in Marilyn Crispell. Using Zingaro and Teitelbaum allows her to create broad and complex soundscapes, but much of the music is unexpectedly spacious and detailed; there is no clutter anywhere."

Writing for Jazz Times, Bill Shoemaker commented: "The rule of thumb that the risk of muddled, unfocused improvisations rises exponentially with each additional person on the bandstand doesn’t apply with the stellar company Leandre keeps... To vary the program, Leandre deploys her colleagues in duo and trio configurations throughout the nine improvisations... there is the same keen attention to the unfolding of the music in the full ensemble passages, as well. At full throttle, this ensemble is overwhelming, but its music is just as compelling at a whisper."

== Track listing ==
Composed by Joëlle Léandre, Marilyn Crispell, Paul Lovens, Richard Teitelbaum, and Carlos Zingaro.

1. "Untitled" – 8:33
2. "Untitled" – 4:55
3. "Untitled" – 2:40
4. "Untitled" – 2:36
5. "Untitled" – 5:12
6. "Untitled" – 3:43
7. "Untitled" – 2:58
8. "Untitled" – 9:45
9. "Untitled" – 5:12
10. "Untitled" – 0:34

== Personnel ==
- Joëlle Léandre – bass
- Carlos Zingaro – violin
- Marilyn Crispell – piano
- Richard Teitelbaum – keyboards, electronics
- Paul Lovens – drums
