= In Full Cry =

Studio album by Joe Maneri Quartet
- Released: 1997
- Recorded: June 1996
- Studio: Hardstudios; Winterthur, Switzerland
- Genre: Jazz
- Length: 62:01
- Label: ECM; ECM 1617
- Producer: Steve Lake

Joe Maneri chronology
Out Right Now (1995)	In Full Cry (1997)	Blessed (1996)

In Full Cry is an album by the Joe Maneri Quartet recorded in June 1996 and released on ECM the following year. The quartet features violinist Mat Maneri and rhythm section John Lockwood and Randy Peterson.

== Reception ==
The AllMusic review by Charlie Wilmoth stated: "A cursory listen might produce the opinion that the members of Maneri's quartet push bent notes too far or in the wrong direction, or that they're playing out of tune, but close listening reveals that they're simply playing by their own rules."

Professional ratings
Review scores
Source	Rating
AllMusic	4/5 stars
The Penguin Guide to Jazz Recordings	3.5/4 stars

== Track listing ==
All compositions by Joe Maneri, John Lockwood, Mat Maneri and Randy Peterson except as indicated

1. "Coarser and Finer" (Maneri, Maneri, Peterson) – 3:02
2. "Tenderly" (Walter Gross, Jack Lawrence) – 9:33
3. "Outside the Dance Hall" – 4:47
4. "A Kind of Birth" – 5:04
5. "The Seed and All" – 4:14
6. "Pulling the Boat In" (Lockwood, Maneri, Maneri) – 2:16
7. "Nobody Knows" (Traditional) – 8:23
8. "In Full Cry" – 7:52
9. "Shaw Was a Good Man, Peewee" (Lockwood, Joe Maneri, Peterson) – 5:07
10. "Lift" (Maneri, Maneri, Peterson) – 2:19
11. "Motherless Child" (Traditional) – 3:23
12. "Prelude to a Kiss" (Duke Ellington, Irving Gordon, Irving Mills) – 6:20

== Personnel ==
- Joe Maneri – clarinet, alto and tenor saxophones, piano
- Mat Maneri – electric 6 string violin
- John Lockwood – double bass
- Randy Peterson – drums, percussion
