= Paniots Nine =

Studio album by Joe Maneri
- Released: March 17, 1998
- Recorded: 1963 and 1981
- Venue: Jordan Hall, Boston, MA
- Studio: Unknown
- Genre: Jazz
- Length: 46:03
- Label: Avant; Avan 067
- Producer: Joe Maneri

Joe Maneri chronology
Paniots Nine (1963/81)	Kalavinka (1985)

Paniots Nine is an album by saxophonist and composer Joe Maneri which was recorded as a demo for Atlantic Records in 1963 and released on the Avant label in 1998 with an additional live recording from 1981.

== Reception ==
Professional ratings
Review scores
Source	Rating
Allmusic	4.5/5 stars
The Penguin Guide to Jazz Recordings	3/4 stars

The Allmusic review by Thom Jurek stated "This album is revelatory, capturing the use of weirdo time signatures like 9/8 in soloing and improvising, laced through with strange intervals and mode changes, and full of joy and drama. The boundaries blur between Eastern European wedding music and free jazz. The whirling clarinets and bowed bass played against a drummer who refused the traditional (in jazz, anyway) concept of rhythm in favor of counterrhythm atop the entire band, with the piano trailing in a rush. ... Paniots Nine provides the chance to hear his already well-developed ideas put into practice, and it is a delight".

== Track listing ==
All compositions by Joe Maneri except where noted

1. "Paniots Nine" (Peter Dolger) – 3:23
2. "Shift Your Tail" – 5:53
3. "Sopra" – 4:26
4. "After Myself" – 5:17
5. "Mountains" – 5:30
6. "Why Don't You Go Far Away" – 3:58
7. "The Horse" (Peter Dolger) – 6:21
8. "Jewish Concert" – 11:15

== Personnel ==
- Joe Maneri – tenor saxophone, clarinet
- Don Burns (tracks 1–7), Greg Silberman (track 8) – piano
- John Beal – bass (tracks 1–7)
- Pete Dolger – drums (tracks 1–7)
