= Live at Vision Festival =

Live album by Joëlle Léandre, Roy Campbell, Marilyn Crispell, and Mat Maneri
- Released: 2011
- Recorded: June 28, 2010
- Venue: Vision Festival, Abrons Arts Center, New York City
- Genre: Free jazz
- Length: 41:41
- Label: Ayler Records aylCD-124

Live at Vision Festival is a live album by the Stone Quartet: bassist Joëlle Léandre, trumpeter Roy Campbell, pianist Marilyn Crispell, and violist Mat Maneri. It was recorded in June 2010 at the Vision Festival held at the Abrons Arts Center in New York City, and was released in 2011 by Ayler Records.

== Reception ==
Professional ratings
Review scores
Source	Rating
All About Jazz	4.5/5 stars
The Free Jazz Collective	4.5/5 stars
Tom Hull – on the Web	B+

In a review for All About Jazz, Eyal Hareuveni called the album "an exemplary document of free-improvisation," and wrote: "It's free-flowing, full of musical ideas, unique dynamics with a cohesive narrative... The Stone Quartet offers cerebral music that demands the utmost attention, but rewards with an exceptional performance."

Stef Gijssels of The Free Jazz Collective described the album as "a captivating listening experience" and stated: "the overall sound evolves like waves in a stream, with phrases colliding and contrasting, yet all moving in the same direction... there is the incredible sense of pace, quite slow, yet determined, creating eery soundscapes, full of longing and inherent tension between the four instruments.

The New York City Jazz Record's Clifford Allen commented: "The general mode seems to be a continual breaking off into smaller, sparser combos and reconvening in massive whorls of sound... Though quite different in temperament, each possible pairing can result in some beautiful, intense improvising... At its heights, the Stone Quartet's Vision performance produced some captivating music that deserves a rehearing."

== Track listing ==
Composed by Joëlle Léandre, Roy Campbell, Marilyn Crispell, and Mat Maneri.

1. "Vision One" – 32:20
2. "Vision Two" – 9:20

== Personnel ==
- Joëlle Léandre – double bass
- Roy Campbell – trumpet, flute
- Marilyn Crispell – piano
- Mat Maneri – viola
