= Tenderly (Joe Maneri album) =

Studio album by Joe Maneri Quartet
- Released: 1999
- Recorded: 1993
- Venue: Peace Lutheran Church, Wayland, Massachusetts
- Genre: Jazz
- Length: 61:55
- Label: HatOLOGY; 525
- Producer: Joe Maneri, Mat Maneri, Pia Uehlinger, Werner X. Uehlinger

Joe Maneri chronology
Get Ready to Receive Yourself (1993)	Tenderly (1993)	Dahabenzapple (1993)

Tenderly is an album by the saxophonist and composer Joe Maneri, recorded in 1993 and released on the HatOLOGY label in 1999.

== Reception ==
Professional ratings
Review scores
Source	Rating
AllMusic	4/5 stars
The Penguin Guide to Jazz Recordings	3/4 stars

In JazzTimes, Duck Baker wrote: "This is unhurried, uncluttered music that moves on its measured way with sure step, but the feeling is almost uneasy, like a delicate balance that could be violently upset at any moment. ... Nothing is easy about this music, including describing it. It refuses to go in any expected direction, yet every turn it takes is true to a consistent vision shared by all four musicians, not one of whom ever takes a wrong step. A most impressive recording". On All About Jazz, Robert Spencer observed: "Tenderly is, in the very best sense, unlike anything else that's being put out these days, except other discs by Joe Maneri. It is essential listening for anyone interested in the genuine and fresh development of the jazz tradition".

== Track listing ==
All compositions by Joe Maneri except where noted

1. "Ascend" – 10:38
2. "Swing" – 10:45
3. "Vignette #1" – 2:50
4. "Vignette #2" – 2:07
5. "What's New?" (Bob Haggart, Johnny Burke) – 9:54
6. "Five Short Pieces" – 10:06
7. "Alto" – 6:02
8. "Tenderly" (Walter Gross, Jack Lawrence) – 9:33

== Personnel ==
- Joe Maneri – tenor saxophone, alto saxophone, clarinet
- Mat Maneri – 6 string electric violin
- Ed Schuller – bass
- Randy Peterson – drums
