= Mat Maneri =

American composer, violin, and viola player

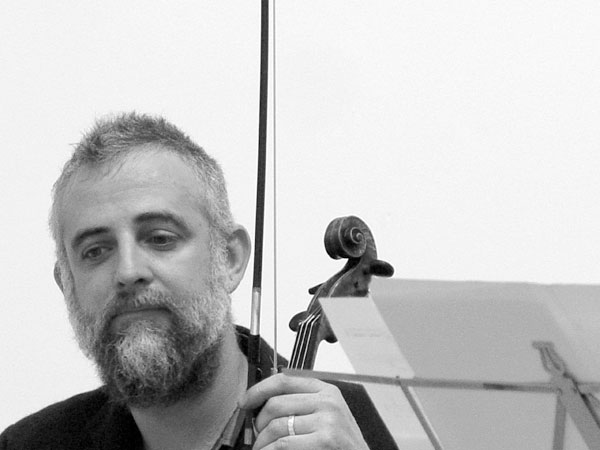
- Mat Maneri in Aarhus, Denmark, 2016

Background information
- Born: October 4, 1969 (age 56); Brooklyn, New York, U.S.
- Genres: Avant-garde jazz
- Occupation: Musician
- Instruments: Violin, viola
- Years active: 1980s–present
- Labels: ECM, Leo, Thirsty Ear, Hathut, Sunnyside

Mat Maneri (born October 4, 1969) is an American composer, violin, and viola player. He is the son of the saxophonist Joe Maneri and Sonja Maneri.

== Career ==
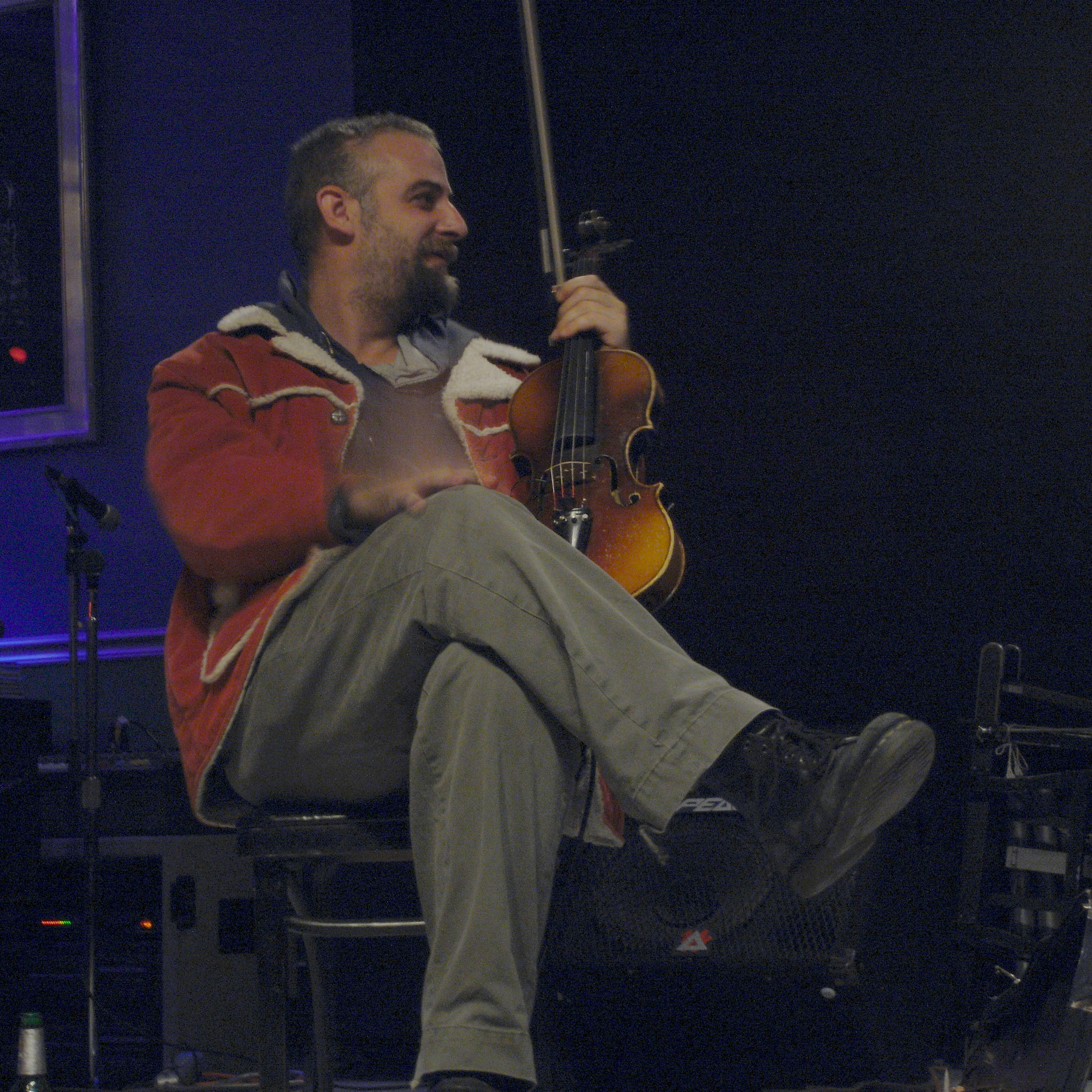
Mat Maneri in 2007

Maneri has recorded with Cecil Taylor, Guerino Mazzola, Matthew Shipp, Joe Morris, Gerald Cleaver, Tim Berne, Borah Bergman, Mark Dresser, William Parker, Michael Formanek, John Lockwood, as well as with his own trio, quartet, and quintet. He also played on various band releases such as: Club d'Elf, Decoupage, Brewed by Noon, Paul Motian's Electric Bebop Band, and Buffalo Collision.

Maneri started studying violin at the age of five. He received a full scholarship as the principal violinist at Walnut Hill High School and New England Conservatory of Music, before going on to pursue a professional career in jazz music.

He started releasing records as a leader in 1996 and performed and recorded worldwide. Maneri has worked with Ed Schuller, John Medeski, Roy Campbell, Paul Motian, Robin Williamson, Drew Gress, Tony Malaby, Ben Monder, Barre Phillips, Joëlle Léandre, Marilyn Crispell, Craig Taborn, Ethan Iverson, David King and many others. Maneri also taught privately and at the New School.

== Discography ==
=== As leader ===
- Fever Bed (Leo, 1997)
- Acceptance (hatOLOGY, 1998)
- Fifty-One Sorrows (Leo, 1999)
- So What (hatOLOGY, 1999)
- Blue Decco (Thirsty Ear, 2000)
- Trinity (ECM, 2001)
- Sustain (Thirsty Ear, 2002)
- For Consequence (Leo, 2003)
- Pentagon (Thirsty Ear, 2005)
- Dust (Sunnyside, 2019)
- Ash (Sunnyside, 2023)
- Mist (Sunnyside, 2026)

=== As co-leader ===
- In Time (Leo, 1994) with Pandelis Karayorgis
- Three Men Walking (ECM, 1995) with Joe Maneri and Joe Morris
- Out Right Now (hatOLOGY, 1995 [2001]) with Joe Maneri and Joe Morris
- Lift & Poise (Leo, 1998) with Pandelis Karayorgis
- Blessed (ECM, 1997) with Joe Maneri
- Light Trigger (No More, 2000) with Randy Peterson
- Tales of Rohnlief (ECM, 2000) with Joe Maneri and Barre Phillips
- Disambiguation (Leo, 2002) with Pandelis Karayorgis
- Going to Church (AUM Fidelity, 2002) with Maneri Ensemble
- Jam (Hopscotch, 2003) with Assif Tsahar and Jim Black
- Angles of Repose (ECM, 2004) with Joe Maneri and Barre Phillips
- Chamber Trio (Leo, 2005) with Mark O'Leary and Matthew Shipp
- Metamorphosis (Leo, 2011) with Arrigo Cappelletti, Andrea Massaria, and Nicola Stranieri
- The Edge of Becoming (No Flight, 2011) with Arrigo Cappelletti and Andrea Massaria
- A Violent Dose of Anything (Leo, 2013) with Ivo Perelman and Matthew Shipp
- Transylvanian Concert (ECM, 2013) with Lucian Ban
- Two Men Walking (Leo, 2014) with Ivo Perelman
- Fantasm (The Loft Sessions) (Nemu, 2014) with Albrecht Maurer and Lucian Ban
- The Transcendent Function (Clean Feed, 2015) with Daniel Levin
- Sounding Tears (Clean Feed, 2017) with Evan Parker and Lucian Ban
- New Artifacts (Clean Feed, 2017) with Tony Malaby and Daniel Levin
- Conference of the Mat/ts (Rogueart, 2018) with Matthew Shipp
- Personal Myths (Mahakala, 2021) with Daniel Levin
- Monuments (Edition Niehler Werft, 2022) with Christopher Dell, Christian Lillinger, and Jonas Westergaard
- Live at the Armoury (Clean Feed, 2023) with Gordon Grdina and Christian Lillinger
- Oedipe Redux (Sunnyside, 2023) with Lucian Ban
- Transylvanian Dance (ECM, 2024) with Lucian Ban
- Chamber (Gotta Let It Out, 2025) with Hein Westgaard

=== As sideman ===
With Borah Bergman

- The River of Sounds (Boxholder, 2000)

With Lucian Ban

- Enesco Re-imagined (Sunnyside, 2010)
- Songs from Afar (Sunnyside, 2016)
- Blutopia (Sunnyside, 2024)

With Lucian Ban and John Surman

- Transylvanian Folk Songs (Sunnyside, 2020)
- Cantica Profana (Sunnyside, 2025)
- Athenaeum Concert (Sunnyside, 2025)

With Michael Bisio

- MBefore (TAO Forms, 2022)

With François Carrier

- Happening (Leo, 2006)
- Openness (Fundacja Słuchaj, 2023)

With Gerald Cleaver

- Adjust (Fresh Sound New Talent, 2001)
- Be It As I See It (Fresh Sound New Talent, 2010)

With Club D'Elf

- As Above - Live at the Lizard Lounge (Grapeshot, 2000)
- Live 4/20/00 NYC (KUFALA, 2004)
- Live Vassar Chapel 2/26/01 (KUFALA, 2005)
- Now I Understand (Accurate, 2006)
- Electric Moroccoland/So Below (Face Pelt, 2011)

With Columbia Icefield

- Ancient Songs of Burlap Heroes (Pyroclastic, 2022)

With Steve Dalachinsky

- Incomplete Directions (Knitting Factory, 1998)

With Kris Davis

- Capricorn Climber (Clean Feed, 2013)

With Whit Dickey

- Life Cycle (AUM Fidelity, 2001)
- Vessel in Orbit (AUM Fidelity, 2017)
- Astral Long Form (Staircase in Space) (TAO Forms, 2022)

With Ellery Eskelin

- Vanishing Point (hat HUT, 2000)

With Heinz Geisser - Guerino Mazzola Quartet

- Maze (Quixotic, 1999)
- Heliopolis (Cadence, 2000)
- Chronotomy (Black Saint, 2004)

With Gordon Grdina

- Klotski (Attaboygirl, 2021)

With Guillermo Gregorio

- Approximately (hat HUT, 1995)
- Red Cube(d) (hat HUT, 1996)

With Masashi Harada

- Obliteration at the End of Multiplication (Leo, 2002)
- The Soul with Longing for Dim Hills and Faint Horizons (Leo, 2005)

With Simon Jermyn's Trot A Mouse

- Pictorial Atlas of Mammals (Skirl, 2015)

With Max Johnson

- The Prisoner (NoBusiness, 2014)

With Pandelis Karayorgis

- The Other Name (Motive, 1992)

With DoYeon Kim

- Wellspring (AUM Fidelity, 2026)

With Franz Koglmann

- Venus in Transit (between the lines, 2001)

With Joëlle Léandre

- For Flowers (Leo, 2004)
- hEARoes (Rogueart, 2023)
- Lifetime Rebel (Rogueart, 2024)

With Daniel Levin

- Live at Firehouse 12 (Clean Feed, 2017)

With Brandon Lopez

- nada sagrada (Relative Pitch, 2025)

With Russ Lossing

- Metal Rat (Clean Feed, 2000)

With Joe Maneri

- Kalavinka (Cochlea, 1989)
- Get Ready to Receive Yourself (Leo, 1993)
- Tenderly (hatOLOGY, 1993 [1999])
- Dahabenzapple (hat ART, 1993 [1996])
- Coming Down the Mountain (hatOLOGY, 1993 [1997])
- Let the Horse Go (Leo, 1995)
- In Full Cry (ECM, 1996)
- The Trio Concerts (Leo, 1997)

With Joe McPhee

- We Know Why the Caged Bird Sings (Rogueart, 2025)

With Matt Mitchell & Kate Gentile

- Snark Horse (Pi, 2021)

With Joe Morris

- You Be Me (Soul Note, 1997)
- A Cloud of Black Birds (AUM Fidelity, 1998)
- Underthru (OmniTone, 1999)
- Soul Search (AUM Fidelity, 1999)
- At the Old Office (Knitting Factory, 2000)
- Balance (Clean Feed, 2014)

With Paul Motian Trio 2000 + Two

- Live at the Village Vanguard Vol. II (Winter & Winter, 2008)
- Live at the Village Vanguard Vol. III (Winter & Winter, 2010)

With Neel Murgai

- Neel Murgai Ensemble (Innova, 2010)

With Natraj

- The Goat Also Gallops (Accurate, 1990)
- Deccan Dance (Galloping Goat, 1998)
- Song of the Swan (Galloping Goat, 2008)

With The Nommonsemble (Whit Dickey, Rob Brown, Matthew Shipp, Maneri)

- Life Cycle (AUM Fidelity, 2001)

With Mark O'Leary

- Self-Luminous (Leo, 2005)

With Ivo Perelman

- Counterpoint (Leo, 2015)
- Breaking Point (Leo, 2016)
- Villa Lobos Suite (Leo, 2016)
- The Art of the Improv Trio, Vol. 2 (Leo, 2016)
- Strings 1 (Leo, 2018)
- Strings 2 (Leo, 2018)
- Strings 3 (Leo, 2019)
- Strings 4 (Leo, 2019)
- Seven Skies Orchestra (Fundacja Słuchaj, 2023)
- Armageddon Flower (AUM Fidelity, 2025)

With Matthew Shipp

- Critical Mass (2.13.61, 1995)
- The Flow of X (2.13.61, 1997)
- By the Law of Music (hat HUT, 1997)
- Gravitational Systems (hatOLOGY, 2000)
- Expansion, Power, Release (hatOLOGY, 2001)
- Duos (hatOLOGY, 2011) with Joe Morris
- The Gospel According to Matthew & Michael (Relative Pitch, 2015)
- Symbolic Reality (Rogueart, 2019)

With Jen Shyu & Jade Tongue

- Sounds and Cries of the World (Pi, 2015)
- Zero Grasses: Ritual for the Losses (Pi, 2021)

With Ches Smith

- The Bell (ECM, 2016)
- Interpret It Well (Pyroclastic, 2022)

With Spring Heel Jack

- Masses (Thirsty Ear, 2001)

With Stone Quartet (Joëlle Léandre, Roy Campbell, Marilyn Crispell, Maneri)

- DMG @ The Stone Volume 1: December 22, 2006 (DMG/ARC, 2008)
- Live at Vision Festival (Ayler, 2011)

With Craig Taborn

- Junk Magic (Thirsty Ear Recordings, 2004)
- Compass Confusion (Pyroclastic, 2020) with Junk Magic

With Cecil Taylor

- Algonquin (Bridge, 1999)

With Two Miles a Day

- Two Miles a Day (2007, Loyal Label/Yeah Yeah)
- Two Miles a Day, So Depending On (2025, Loyal Label/Yeah Yeah)

With David S. Ware

- Threads (Thirsty Ear, 2003)

With Robin Williamson

- The Iron Stone (ECM, 2006)

With Keith Yaun

- Countersink (Leo, 1998)
- Amen: Improvisations on Messiaen (Boxholder, 1999)

With Jeong Lim Yang

- Synchronicity (Sunnyside, 2025)
