= Lines (Pandelis Karayorgis album) =

Studio album by Pandelis Karayorgis, Eric Pakula
- Released: 1995
- Recorded: March 16–21, 1995
- Studio: Cambridge, Massachusetts
- Genre: Jazz
- Length: 67:17
- Label: Accurate

Pandelis Karayorgis chronology
Between Speech & Song (1994)	Lines (1995)	Lift & Poise (1998)

Lines is an album by jazz pianist Pandelis Karayorgis and alto saxophonist Eric Pakula, which was recorded in 1995 and released on Accurate. They are joined by bassists Nate McBride and Jonathan Robinson and drummers John McLellan and Eric Rosenthal in various combinations, playing compositions by Lennie Tristano, Lee Konitz, Warne Marsh and Ted Brown, along with some originals.

== Reception ==
Professional ratings
Review scores
Source	Rating
AllMusic	4/5 stars

In his review for AllMusic, Alex Henderson states "While Karayorgis refuses to be the least bit sentimental, Pakula has no problem being lyrical one minute and intellectual the next. One thing they share, of course, is a healthy appreciation of Tristano's innovations, but thankfully, they do a great deal of interpreting instead of placing his music under a sheet of glass and treating it like a museum piece."

== Track listing ==
1. "317 E. 32nd Street" (Lennie Tristano) – 3:48
2. "Two Not One" (Lennie Tristano) – 5:25
3. "King Oliver" (Eric Pakula) – 5:14
4. "Dark Song" (Eric Pakula) – 5:01
5. "Featherbed" (Ted Brown) – 2:33
6. "Kary's Trance" (Lee Konitz) – 3:38
7. "Mishing" (Pandelis Karayorgis) – 4:36
8. "April" (Lennie Tristano) – 5:44
9. "All About You" (Lennie Tristano) – 2:27
10. "Lament" (Eric Pakula) – 5:37
11. "In Time" (Pandelis Karayorgis) – 3:47
12. "Dreams" (Lennie Tristano) – 4:25
13. "Out and Out" (Pandelis Karayorgis) – 4:41
14. "Baby" (Lennie Tristano) – 5:53
15. "Background Music" (Warne Marsh) – 3:42

== Personnel ==
- Eric Pakula - alto sax
- Pandelis Karayorgis - piano
- Jonathan Robinson - bass
- Nate McBride - bass
- Eric Rosenthal - drums
- John McLellan - drums
