= 2-Z (album) =

Studio album by Matthew Shipp
- Released: 1996
- Recorded: August 15, 1995
- Studio: Seltzer Sound, New York City
- Genre: Jazz
- Length: 44:00
- Label: 2.13.61

Matthew Shipp chronology
Prism (1996)	2-Z (1996)	The Flow of X (1997)

2-Z is an album by the American jazz pianist Matthew Shipp with AACM saxophonist Roscoe Mitchell, recorded in 1995 and released on the 2.13.61 label. Shipp played previously with Mitchell's Note Factory on the album This Dance Is for Steve McCall, but 2-Z represents their first collaboration with Shipp as a leader.

== Reception ==
Professional ratings
Review scores
Source	Rating
AllMusic	4/5 stars
The Penguin Guide to Jazz	3/4 stars
(The New) Rolling Stone Album Guide	2.5/5 stars

In his review for AllMusic, Chris Kelsey states: "The men speak the same language —albeit with slightly different accents— and they communicate quite well. A nice record." The Penguin Guide to Jazz wrote that the album "is a meeting of generations, and Shipp sounds respectful and happy to take second place for much of it, constantly searching for some normative path that might hint at a tonal centre".

== Track listing ==
All compositions by Matthew Shipp and Roscoe Mitchell

1. "2-Z" – 3:11
2. "2-Z-2" – 4:03
3. "2-Z-3" – 4:45
4. "2-Z-4" – 3:47
5. "2-Z-5" – 2:53
6. "2-Z-6" – 2:46
7. "2-Z-7" – 2:40
8. "2-Z-8" – 4:13
9. "2-Z-9" – 2:54
10. "2-Z-10" – 6:02
11. "2-Z-11 (The Physics of Angels)" – 6:46

== Personnel ==
- Matthew Shipp – piano
- Roscoe Mitchell – alto sax, soprano sax
