= Haruna Miyake =

Japanese pianist and composer (born 1942)

Haruna Miyake 三宅榛名
- Also known as: Shibata Haruna
- Born: 1942; Tokyo
- Occupation(s): pianist, composer
- Instrument: piano

Haruna Miyake (三宅 榛名, Miyake Haruna; born 20 September 1942 in Tokyo) is a Japanese pianist and composer, who also uses the name Haruna Shibata. She was born in Tokyo and studied music there, making her debut as a pianist at age 14 playing Mozart with the Tokyo Symphony orchestra. She continued her studies at the Juilliard School of Music in New York City, and afterward worked as a pianist and composer, touring in the United States. She often collaborates with pianist and composer Yuji Takahashi. Her composition Poem for String Orchestra received the Edward Benjamin Award.

== Works ==
Miyake combines Japanese and Western idiom, and often uses traditional Japanese instruments in her compositions. Selected works include:

- Why Not, My Baby? for soprano, piano and trumpet
- Shiyoku
- Piano Concerto
- Fantasy for Milky Way Railroad
- Phantom of a Flower
