= Joëlle Léandre =

French musician (born 1951)

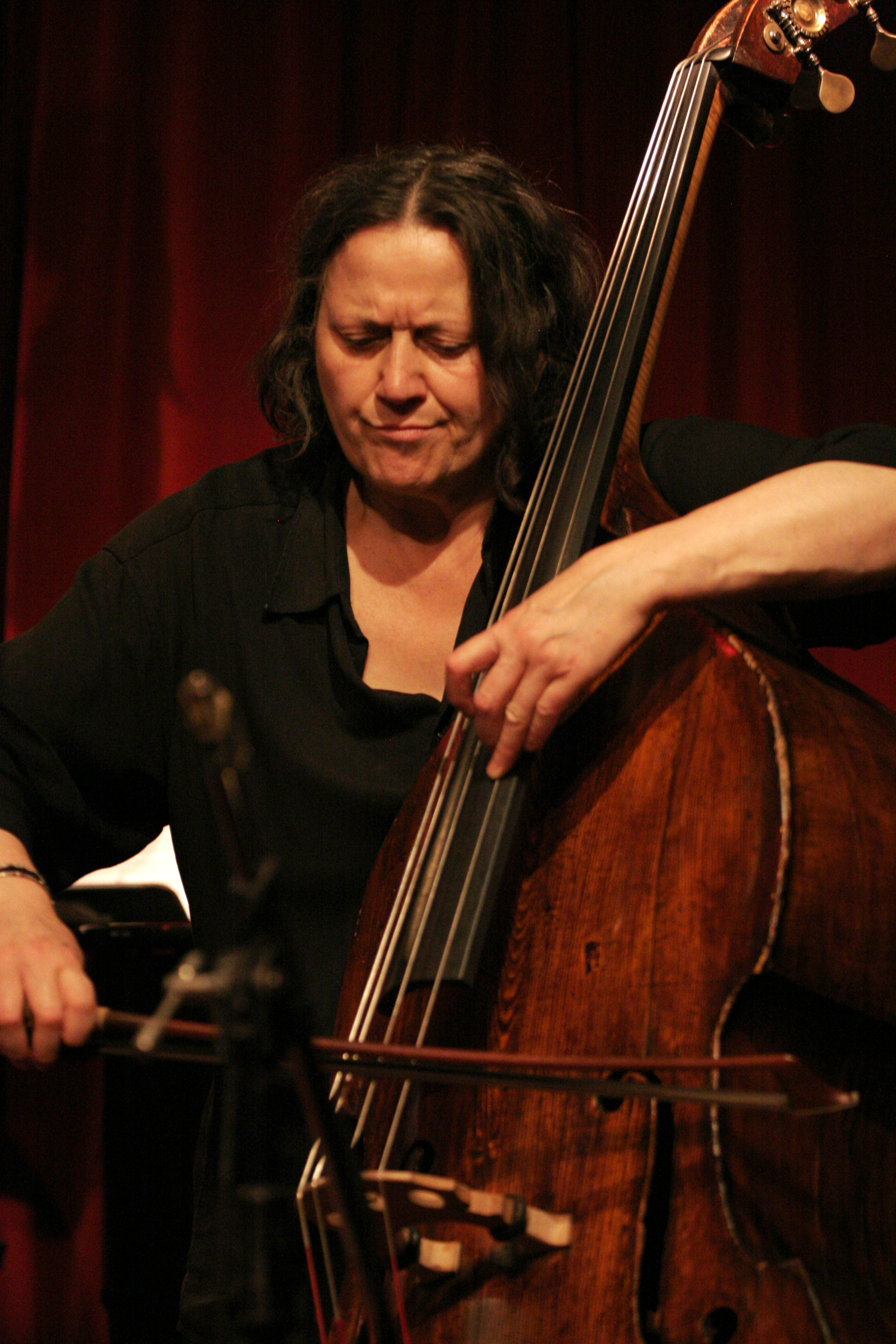
- Joëlle Léandre at Cornelia Street Cafe; 2 July 2010 Photo: Claire Stefani

Background information
- Born: 12 September 1951 (age 74); Aix-en-Provence, France
- Genres: Contemporary classical, free improvisation
- Occupations: Musician, composer
- Instruments: Double bass, vocals
- Labels: FMP, Leo, RogueArt, Setola di Maiale Red Toucan, Intakt, Hat Art, Ambiances Magnétique

Joëlle Léandre (born 12 September 1951) is a French double bassist, vocalist, and composer active in new music and free improvisation.

In the field of contemporary music, she has performed with Pierre Boulez's Ensemble InterContemporain, and worked with Merce Cunningham and György Szabados and John Cage. Both Cage and Giacinto Scelsi have composed works specifically for her.

She gave a solo concert at Jazz em Agosto in 2007 (Calouste Gulbenkian Foundation, Lisbon, Portugal). At this same jazz festival, Léandre also performed in the Quartet Noir, a quartet which rarely performed live, with Marilyn Crispell, Urs Leimgruber and Fritz Hauser.

She has also collaborated with musicians in the fields of jazz and improvised music, including Derek Bailey, Barre Phillips, Anthony Braxton, George E. Lewis, India Cooke, Evan Parker, Irène Schweizer, Steve Lacy, Maggie Nicols, Fred Frith, Vinny Golia, Carlos Zingaro, John Zorn, Susie Ibarra, J. D. Parran, Kevin Norton, Eric Watson, Ernst Reijseger, Akosh S. and Sylvie Courvoisier.

In 1983 she became a member of the European Women Improvising Group (EWIG), which evolved from the Feminist Improvising Group, and in the early 1990s she co-founded the feminist improvising trio Les Diaboliques, with Schweizer and Nicols.

In 2002 she was resident professor of music at Mills College in California.

== Discography ==
- 1981 Contrabassiste (QCA Redmark-Liben)
- 1981–1982 Instant Replay with Lol Coxhill (Nato)
- 1982 Live at The Bastille with Maggie Nicols and Lindsay Cooper (Sync Pulse)
- 1982 28 rue Dunois juillet 1982 with Derek Bailey, George Lewis, Evan Parker (Fou)
- 1983 Couscous with Lol Coxhill (Nato)
- 1983 Les Douze sons (Nato)
- 1983 Trios (Incus)
- 1984 Live at Taktlos with Irène Schweizer and Paul Lovens (Intakt)
- 1984 Sweet Zee, Daunik Lazro (Hat Art)
- 1984 Pour un demi-poulet (Nato)
- 1985–1987 Paris Quartet (Intakt)
- 1985 Sincerely (Plainisphare)
- 1986 Canaille (Intakt)
- 1986 Cordial gratin with Irène Schweizer (FMP)
- 1986 Frerebet with Peter Kowald (FMP)
- 1986 Soeurbet with Peter Kowald (FMP)
- 1986–1988 The Storming of the Winter Palace (Intakt)
- 1987 Contrabasse et voix (ADDA)
- 1987 Les domestiques with Jon Rose (Konnex)
- 1987 Violin Music for Restaurants with Jon Rose (ReR)
- 1988 Anthony Braxton Group, Ensemble (Victoriaville) (Victo)
- 1988 En Chair et en os, on the poems of Julien Blaine (DCC)
- 1990 Écritures, with Carlos Zingaro (In Situ)
- 1990 Trend, avec Mario Schiano, Evan Parker, Alex Von Schlippenbach and Paul Lytton (Splasc (h))
- 1990 Urban Bass (EDD)
- 1991 Palimpseste with Eric Watson (Hat Art)
- 1991 Canaille 91)
- 1992 Haunting the Spirits Inside Them (Music & Arts)
- 1992 Okanagon, compositions of Giacinto Scelsi (Hat Art)
- 1992 L'Histoire de Mme Tasco, Canvas Trio (Hat Art)
- 1992 Urgent Meeting 221 (with Un Drame Musical Instantané) (GRRR)
- 1992 Letter 3, duo with Sainkho Namchylak (Leo)
- 1993 Les Diaboliques (Intakt)
- 1993 Blue Goo Park, duo with Rüdiger Carl (FMP)
- 1993 Nuage en voyage, duo with Annick Nozati (Zoo)
- 1993 Tracks, with Mario Schiano and Peter Kowald (Le Parc Music)
- 1994 Sound on Stage Part 1, with Carlos Zingaro (Musicworks)
- 1994 Sincerely (Plainisphare)
- 1994 Joëlle Léandre – Pascal Contet (Grave)
- 1994 Blue Memories, with Mario Schiano and Renato Geremia (Splasc (h))
- 1994 Jon Rose, ://shoppinglive@victo (ReR)
- 1994 Les Diaboliques, Splitting Image (Intakt, 1997)
- 1994–1995 No Comment (Red Toucan)
- 1995 John Cage (Auvidis Montaigne)
- 1995 Not Missing Drums Project, with Urban Voices (Leo)
- 1996 Live @ Banlieues Bleues, with Georg Graewe and François Houle (Red Toucan)
- 1996 18 Colors, duo with Lauren Newton (Leo)
- 1996 Duos 3–13, For 4 Ears, duos with Fredy Studer
- 1996 Moments, Canvas Trio (Music & Arts)
- 1996 No Try No Fail, trio with Urs Leimgruber and Fritz Hauser (Hatology)
- 1998 Joëlle et Tetsu, duo with Tetsu Saitoh (Omba)
- 1997 Philippe Fénelon, Five Pieces on New Music (MFA)
- 1997 Incandescences, duo with Giorgio Occhipinti (Tonesetters)
- 1997 No Waiting, duo with Derek Bailey (Potlatch)
- 1997 E'vero, duo with Sebi Tramontana (Leo)
- 1997 Les Diaboliques, Live at the Rhinefalls (Intakt)
- 1997 Chantal Dumas, Le parfum des femmes (OHM/AVTR)
- 1998 Contrabasses, duo with William Parker (Leo)
- 1998 Short Takes, duo with Haruna Miyake (Egg Farm)
- 1998 Improvisation & Performance (Mesostics)
- 1998 Ryoanji: John Cage Concert in Hiroshima with Kumi Wakao (Mesostics)
- 1998 Solo Bass (Mesostics)
- 1998 Sapporo Duets, duo with Ryoji Hojito (Tonesetters/Jazz Halo)
- 1998 Quartet Noir, with Urs Leimgruber, Marilyn Crispell and Fritz Hauser (Victo)
- 1998–1999 Saadet Türköz, Marmara Sea (Intakt)
- 1999 Joëlle Léandre Project (Leo)
- 1999 Tricotage, duo with Danielle P Roger (Ambiances Magnétiques)
- 1999 Organic – Mineral, with Kazue Sawai (In Situ)
- 1994–2000 Amalgam (e): 10 ans de Red Toucan (Red Toucan)
- 2000 Dire du dire (Rectangle)
- 2000 Quelque part (Lithium)
- 2000 C'est ça, with Hasse Poulsen and François Houle (Red Toucan)
- 2000 John Cage #4, with Kumi Wakao (Mesostics)
- 2000 Joëlle Léandre & Yu Wakao (Mesostics)
- 2000 Signature: live at the Egg Farm, duos with Masahiko Satoh and Yuji Takahashi (ReR)
- 1994 Les Diaboliques, Splitting Image (Intakt, 1997)
- 1994–1995 No Comment (Red Toucan)
- 1995 John Cage (Auvidis Montaigne)
- 1995 Not Missing Drums Project, with Urban Voices (Leo)
- 1996 Live @ Banlieues Bleues, with Georg Graewe and François Houle (Red Toucan)
- 1996 18 Colors, duo with Lauren Newton (Leo)
- 1996 Duos 3–13, For 4 Ears, duos with Fredy Studer
- 1996 Moments, Canvas Trio (Music & Arts)
- 1996 No Try No Fail, trio with Urs Leimgruber and Fritz Hauser (Hatology)
- 1998 Joëlle et Tetsu, duo with Tetsu Saitoh (Omba)
- 1997 Philippe Fénelon, Five Pieces on New Music (MFA)
- 1997 Incandescences, duo with Giorgio Occhipinti (Tonesetters)
- 1997 No Waiting, duo with Derek Bailey (Potlatch)
- 1997 E'vero, duo with Sebi Tramontana (Leo)
- 1997 Les Diaboliques, Live at the Rhinefalls (Intakt)
- 1997 Chantal Dumas, Le parfum des femmes (OHM/AVTR)
- 1998 Contrabasses, duo with William Parker (Leo)
- 1998 Short Takes, duo with Haruna Miyake (Egg Farm)
- 1998 Improvisation & Performance (Mesostics)
- 1998 Ryoanji: John Cage Concert in Hiroshima with Kumi Wakao (Mesostics)
- 1998 Solo Bass (Mesostics)
- 1998 Sapporo Duets, duo with Ryoji Hojito (Tonesetters/Jazz Halo)
- 1998 Quartet Noir, with Urs Leimgruber, Marilyn Crispell and Fritz Hauser (Victo)
- 1998–1999 Saadet Türköz, Marmara Sea (Intakt)
- 1999 Joëlle Léandre Project (Leo)
- 1999 Tricotage, duo with Danielle P Roger (Ambiances Magnétiques)
- 1999 Organic – Mineral, with Kazue Sawai (In Situ)
- 1994–2000 Amalgam (e): 10 ans de Red Toucan (Red Toucan)
- 2000 Dire du dire (Rectangle)
- 2000 Quelque part (Lithium)
- 2000 C'est ça, with Hasse Poulsen and François Houle (Red Toucan)
- 2000 John Cage #4, with Kumi Wakao (Mesostics)
- 2000 Joëlle Léandre & Yu Wakao (Mesostics)
- 2000 Signature: live at the Egg Farm, duos with Masahiko Satoh and Yuji Takahashi (Red Toucan)
- 2000 Festival Beyond Innocence: 4 1999–2000 (two pieces on a compilation) (Innocent)
- 2000 Concerten, Muziekinstrumentenmuseum (one piece and solo on a compilation) (MIM)
- 2000 La 5e feuille, The poetry of Julien Blaine (DCC)
- 2001 Out of Sound (Leo)
- 2001 Timbreplus, Timbre with Hauser, Léandre, Leimgruber (ARBE)
- 2001 Madly You, Lazro, Léandre, Zingaro, Lovens (Potlatch)
- 2001 1/2, Léandre, Zingaro, Tramontana (No label)
- 2001 The Chicken Check in Complex, Zingaro, Léandre, Tramontana (Leo)
- 2001 For Flowers, Joëlle Léandre, Mat Maneri, Joel Ryan, Christophe Marguet (Leo)
- 2001 Passaggio, Sylvie Courvoisier, Joëlle Léandre, Susie Ibarra (Intakt)
- 2002 Roland Kirk,Duets 2, avec Ramón López (Leo)
- 2002 Ocean of Earth, Kevin Norton, Joëlle Léandre, Tomas Ulrich (Barking Hoop)
- 2002 Tempted to Smile, Fred Frith, Joëlle Léandre, Jonathan Segel (Spool)
- 2002 No Day Rising, Brett Larner, Joëlle Léandre, Kazuhisa Uchihashi (Spool)
- 2002 The Space_Between, Philip Gelb, Pauline Oliveras, Dana Reason, Joëlle Léandre (482 Music)
- 2002 Evident, duo avec Mark Nauseef (482 Music)
- 2002 One More Time, Steve Lac, Joëlle Léandre (Leo)
- 2003 After You Gone, Barre Phillips, Joëlle Léandre, William Parker, Tetsu Saitoh (Victo)
- 2003 Györ, duo with Akosh S (Reqords)
- 2003 Sur une balançoire, duo with Gianni Lenoci (Ambiances Magnétiques)
- 2003–2004 Irène Schweizer un film de Gitta Gsell (Intakt DVD)
- 2004 India Cooke, Firedance (Red Toucan)
- 2004 Ramón López Flowers Trio, Flowers of Peace (Leo)
- 2004 Quartet Noir, Lugano (Victo)
- 2004 Cruxes, Aurora Josephson, Joëlle Léandre, Damon Smith, Martin Blume (Balance Point Acoustics)
- 2005 Concerto Grosso, Tonesetters (Jazz Halo)
- 2005 Face It!, duo with Lauren Newton (Leo)
- 2005 At The Le Mans Jazz Festival (Leo)
- 2005 Voyages, duo with Masahiko Satoh (BJSP)
- 2005 Open Waves Concert, duo with Carlos Bechegas (Forward)
- 2005 Freeway, duo with Pascal Contet (Clean Feed)
- 2005 25th NWM, Ninth World Music (one piece on a compilation)
- 2006 Les Diaboliques, Jubilee Concert (Intakt DVD)
- 2006 Winter in New York, duo with Kevin Norton (Leo)
- 2006 9 moments, Houle, Léandre, Strid (Red Toucan)
- 2006 DMG @ The Stone Volume 1: December 22, 2006, with The Stone Quartet (Léandre, Marilyn Crispell, Roy Campbell, Mat Maneri) (DMG)
- 2006 À l'improviste, Joëlle Léandre, Barre Phillips (Kadima Collective)
- 2007 Psychomagic Combination, Joëlle Léandre, Gianni Lenoci, Vittorino Curci, Marcello Magliocchi (Setola di Maiale)
- 2007 Duo (Heidelberg Loppem), duo with Anthony Braxton (Leo)
- 2007 Live in Israël, solo and collective improvisations (Kadima Collective)
- 2008 Trace, Léandre, Vidal, Boni (Red Toucan)
- 2008 Out of Nowhere, duo with Quentin Sirjacq (Ambiances Magnétiques)
- 2008 Basse Continue, DVD with interviews and in concert (Hors Œl éditions)
- 2008 KOR, duo with Akosh S (Leo)
- 2008 Transatlantic Visions, duo with George Lewis (RogueArt)
- 2009 Live at Dunois, duo with William Parker (Leo)
- 2009 Live aux Instants Chavirés, duo with Jean-Luc Cappozzo (Kadima Collective)
- 2010 Before After, trio with Nicole Mitchell and Dylan Van Der Schyff (RogueArt)
- 2011 That Overt Desire Of Object, duo with Phillip Greenlief (Relative Pitch)
- 2011 Live at Vision Festival, with The Stone Quartet (Léandre, Marilyn Crispell, Roy Campbell, Mat Maneri) (Ayler)
- 2012 Trans, en duo with Serge Teyssot-Gay (Intervalle Triton)
- 2013 The Bill Has Been Paid, en duo with Steve Dalachinsky (Dark Tree)
- 2013 Trio Ceccaldi avec Joëlle Leandre (Ayler)
- 2913 14 rue Paul Fort, Paris with Benoit Delbecq, François Houle (Leo)
- 2014 Tout va monter, trio with Benoît Delbecq and Carnage The Executioner (Nato)
- 2014 Hasparren Daunik Lazro (NoBusiness)
- 2014 3 with Pascal Contet (Ayler)
- 2014 Sisters Where with Nicole Mitchell (RogueArt)
- 2015 MMM Quartet with Fred Frith, Alvin Curran, Urs Leimgruber (RogueArt)
- 2016 Joëlle Léandre 10, Can You Hear Me?, with Guillaume Aknine, Florent Stache, Jean-Brice Godet, Théo Ceccaldi (Ayler)
- 2016 Unleashed Myra Melford, Nicole Mitchell (RogueArt)
