= Carlos Zingaro =

Portuguese violinist and electronic musician (born 1948)

Carlos Zíngaro
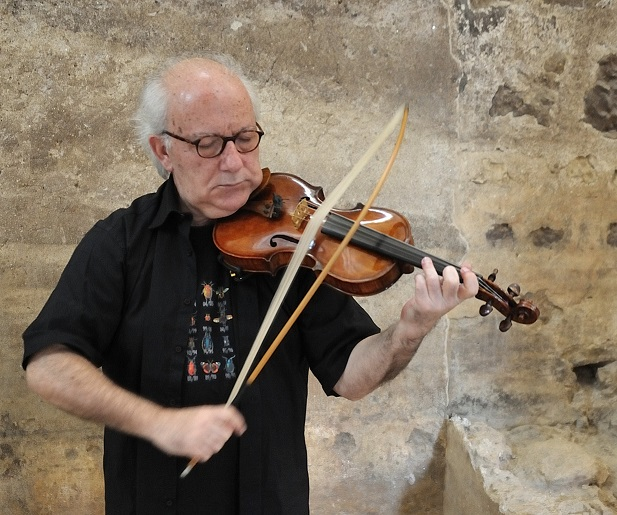

Background information
- Born: Carlos Alves; 15 December 1948 (age 77); Lisbon, Portugal
- Genres: Free improvisation, Electronic
- Occupation: Musician
- Instruments: Violin and Curved Bow

Carlos Zíngaro (or Carlos "Zíngaro" Alves, born 15 December 1948) is a Portuguese violinist and electronic musician active in free improvisation.

== Biography ==
Zingaro studied classical music at the Lisbon Music Conservatory from 1953 to 1965, and during the years 1967/68 he studied pipe organ at the Sacred Music High School and did studies on musicology and electroacoustic music. Also, during the 1960s, he was a member of the Lisbon University Chamber Orchestra. In 1967 he formed the musical group PLEXUS. Zingaro has performed at many music festivals in Europe, Asia and America. He has more than 50 published records under his name or in collaboration with other musicians / composers.

Zingaro was a founding member and director of the Lisbon art gallery Cómicos from 1984 till 1990, and his work has been exhibited, awarded several prizes for his illustration, comics and paintings, samples of which can be seen on a number of CD sleeves. Since 2002 he is the founder and president of experimental arts / music association GRANULAR.

== Selected discography ==
- Andrea Centazzo Mitteleuropa Orchestra Doctor Faustus with Carlos Zingaro, Gianluigi Trovesi, Theo Jörgensmann, Albert Mangelsdorff, Enrico Rava, Carlo Actis Dato
- The Space Between Carlos Zíngaro, Rodrigo Amado, Ken Filiano for Clean Feed Label
- Madly You Carlos Zíngaro, Daunik Lazro, Joelle Leandre, Paul Lovens First edition on Potlatch in 2002; re-edition on FOU records in 2023
- "Beauvais Cathedral" Emanem 4061. Kent Carter.
- "La contra basse" Le chant du monde. Kent Carter.
- "Sweet Zee" hat Art 1985. Daunik Lazro.
- "The Willisau suites" ITM Pacific 970077/Emanem 4105. Kent Carter String Trio.
- "Once" Incus CD 04. Company R. Teitelbaum, Lee Konitz, Derek Bailey, Steve Noble, Tristan Honsinger, etc.
- "Solo" in situ ADDA 590076.
- "Écritures" in situ 038. with Joélle Lèandre.
- "Café noir" GRRR 2019. Trio Pied de Poule.
- "Pour garder l'adn en état 110" GRRR 2020. With Un Drame Musical Instantané.
- "Musiques de scène" BBB001CD.
- "L'Histoire de Mme. Tasco" Hat art 6122. Canvas Trio J. Lèandre, Rudiger Carl
- "The arrow of time" Ano Kato Record 2005. Floros Floridis
- "Periferia" in situ 164. With Daunik Lazro, J. Bolcato, Sakis Papadimitriou. First edition in 1994; re-edition on FOU records in 2022
- "Sound on stage part 1" Musicworks 58. With Joelle Lèandre.
- Hallelujah, Anyway – Remembering Tom Cora Tzadik TZ 760s. Tom Cora/Leo Smith/Richard Teitelbaum/Carlos Zingaro
- "Lisboa! a soundscape portrait" ZP9401.
- "Cyberband" Moers Music 03000 CD. Richard Teitelbaum. Fred Frith, George Lewis, Otomo Yoshihide, Tom Cora, etc.
- "Golem" Tzadik 7105. Richard Teitelbaum. Shelley Hirsch, David Moss, George Lewis
- "Hauts plateaux" Potlatch P 498. Duo with Daunik Lazro. 1998
- "Cuts" FMP CD 94. With Peter Kowald and Ort Ensemble.
- "Moments" Music and Arts CD-999. Canvas Trio.
- "Western Front" Vancouver 1996 hatOLOGY 513. Duo with Peggy Lee.
- "Pifarely/Zingaro" in situ 167. Duo with Dominique Pifarély; part of 3CD box.
- "Release From Tension" audEo 0197.
- "Cenas de uma Tarde de Verão" Teatro Nacional D.Maria II TNDM II 001CD.
- "Blood pool" AnAnAnA HHH 001. Track on compilation CD.
- ">11>ways>to>proceed" For 4 Ears CD1035. Burgener/Teitelbaum/Müller/Zingaro.
- "Joëlle Léandre Project", Leo LR CD287. Joëlle Léandre, Richard Teitelbaum, Paul Lovens, Marilyn Crispell
- "The chicken check in complex" Leo LR CD340. Zingaro/Léandre/Tramontana.
- "Total Music Meeting 2001: Audiology - 11 groups live in Berlin" A/L/L002. On two tracks on this compilation CD.
- "25th NWM, Ninth World Music NWM0 25" CD. One track on compilation CD.
- "Cage of sand" sirr.ecords sirr 2997. Solo violin and electronics.
- "Music for strings, percussion & electronics" BF59. ZFP Quartet. Simon Fell, Marcio Mattos, Mark Sanders
- "Grammar" Rossbin RS 019. Punctual Trio. Fred Lomberg-Holm, Lou Malozzi
- "At the Le Mans Jazz Festival" Leo LR CD458/459. Joëlle Léandre, Paul Lovens, Sebi Tramontana

== Bibliography ==
- A Caixa - written by Sérgio Godinho, illustrated by Carlos Zíngaro. Edições Asa, ISBN 972-41-0252-1
