= Heart and Sack =

Studio album by Pandelis Karayorgis
- Released: 1998
- Recorded: April 24 & 25, 1998
- Genre: Jazz
- Length: 50:51
- Label: Leo
- Producer: Pandelis Karayorgis, Leo Feigin

Pandelis Karayorgis chronology
Lift & Poise (1998)	Heart and Sack (1998)	Let It (2001)

Heart and Sack is an album by jazz pianist Pandelis Karayorgis, which was recorded in 1998 and released on Leo Lab, a sublabel of Leo Records. It was the debut recording of his trio with bassist Nate McBride and drummer Randy Peterson.

== Reception ==
Professional ratings
Review scores
Source	Rating
AllMusic	4/5 stars
The Penguin Guide to Jazz	4/4 stars

In his review for AllMusic, Steve Loewy states "Peterson and McBride are both very effective partners, sharing the leader's penchant for quirky, carefully constructed nuance. As a trio, they may not be trailblazing entirely new territory, but the journey is filled with tastefully delicious twists and turns."

The Penguin Guide to Jazz says that "the playing is richly evocative and never predictable, even if McBride and Peterson occasionally lapse into free‑jazz argot during some of Karayorgis's more abstract passages."

The All About Jazz review by Glenn Astarita states "The subtle nature of this outing lies within each musician’s ability to develop intricate and poignant dialogue while never losing the tune. That alone, is art unto itself. Heart and Sack is highly recommended."

The JazzTimes review by Bill Shoemaker notes that "Despite Karayorgis' well-defined imprint on the album, this is a collective effort from beginning to end. McBride and Peterson's fluent contributions are essential to the program's pace and impact."

== Track listing ==
All compositions by Pandelis Karayorgis except as indicated

1. "Lautir" (Ken McIntyre) – 6:00
2. "What Did I Just Say?" – 7:04
3. "Miss Ann" (Eric Dolphy) – 2:45
4. "How Daisies Jiggle" – 5:20
5. "Straight Blues" – 5:59
6. "Frustration" (Duke Ellington) – 2:49
7. "I Hear Things" – 6:12
8. "Half Tilt" (Nate McBride) – 5:31
9. "Corpus Delicti" – 4:39
10. "Heart and Sack" – 4:03

== Personnel ==
- Pandelis Karayorgis - piano
- Nate McBride - bass
- Randy Peterson - drums
