= The Max Roach Trio Featuring the Legendary Hasaan =

Studio album by Max Roach Trio
- Released: March 1965
- Recorded: December 4 & 7, 1964; New York City
- Genres: Hard bop; post-bop
- Length: 41:07
- Labels: Atlantic; LP 1435
- Producer: Arif Mardin

Max Roach chronology
| Speak, Brother, Speak! (1962) | The Max Roach Trio Featuring the Legendary Hasaan (1965) | Drums Unlimited (1965-66) |

The Max Roach Trio Featuring the Legendary Hasaan is an album by the American jazz drummer Max Roach with pianist Hasaan Ibn Ali, recorded in 1964 and released on the Atlantic label in March 1965. It is the only recording featuring Ibn Ali released during his lifetime.

== Reception ==
Professional ratings
Review scores
| Source | Rating |
|---|---|
| Allmusic | 4.5/5 stars |
| The Penguin Guide to Jazz Recordings | 3/4 stars |
| Record Mirror | 3/5 stars |
| Tom Hull | B+ |

Allmusic awarded the album 4½ stars with reviewer Scott Yanow stating: "This is a classic of its kind and it is fortunate that it was made, but it is a tragedy that Hasaan would not record again and that he would soon sink back into obscurity".

== Track listing ==
All compositions by Hasaan Ibn Ali

1. "Three-Four vs. Six-Eight Four-Four Ways" - 5:40
2. "Off My Back Jack" - 5:13
3. "Hope So Elmo" - 3:52
4. "Almost Like Me" - 6:39
5. "Din-Ka Street" - 6:08
6. "Pay Not Play Not" - 8:08
7. "To Inscribe" - 5:00
- Recorded in New York on December 4 (tracks 1, 4 & 5) and December 7 (tracks 2, 3, 6 & 7), 1964

== Personnel ==
- Max Roach - drums
- Hasaan Ibn Ali - piano
- Art Davis - bass
