= Joe Maneri =

American saxophonist and composer (1927–2009)

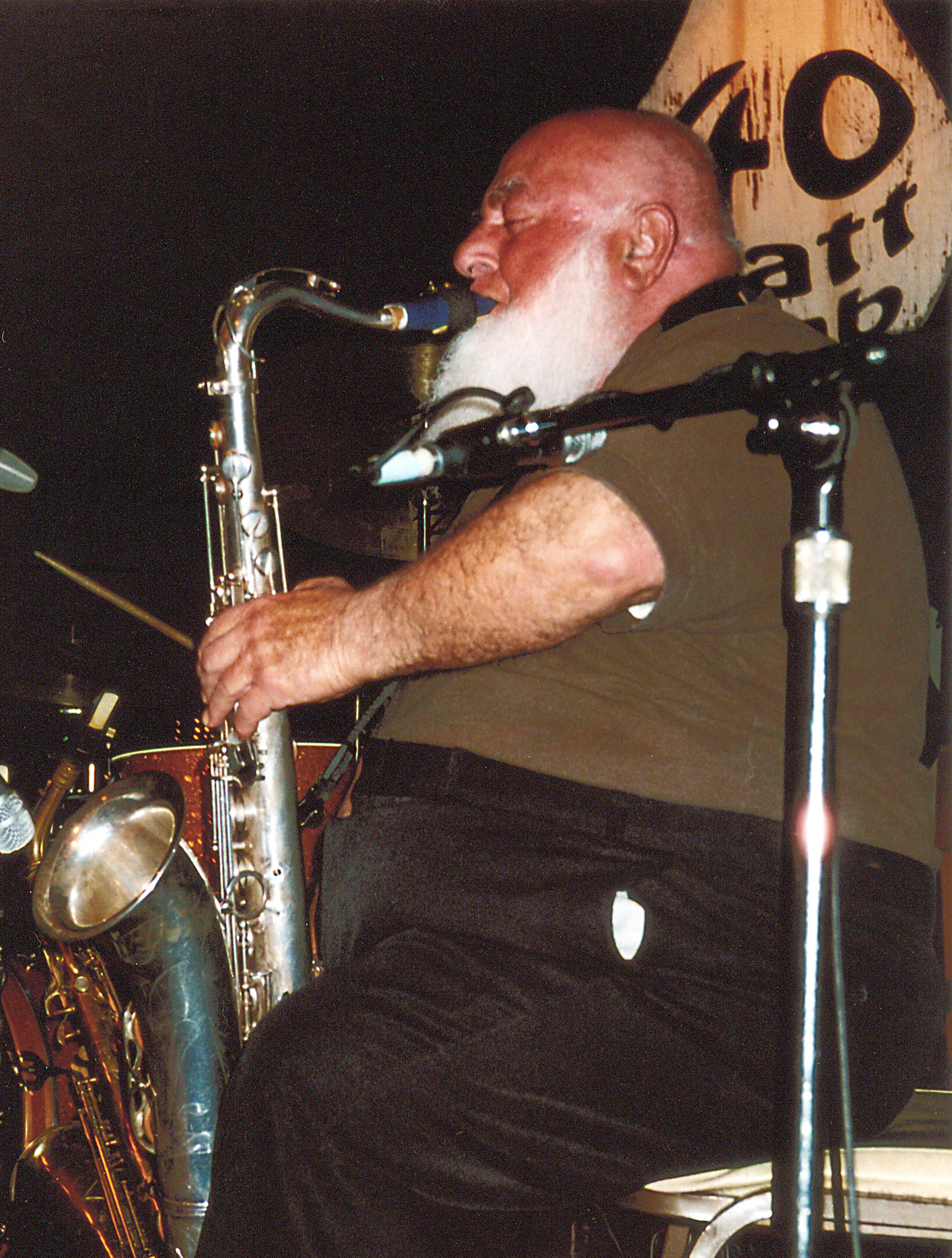
- Maneri at the 40 Watt Club in Athens, Georgia, 2004

Background information
- Born: Joseph Gabriel Esther Maneri; February 9, 1927; Brooklyn, New York, U.S.
- Died: August 24, 2009 (aged 82) Boston, Massachusetts, U.S.
- Genres: Jazz; microtonal jazz; free improvisation
- Occupations: Musician; composer
- Instruments: Tenor saxophone; clarinet
- Years active: 1960–2009
- Labels: Leo; ECM; Hathut
- Spouse: Sonja Maneri (née Holzwarth)

Joseph Gabriel Esther Maneri (February 9, 1927 – August 24, 2009) was an American jazz saxophonist, clarinetist, and composer. Violinist Mat Maneri is his son. Maneri was considered a pioneer and important theorist of microtonal improvisation.

Early in his career, Maneri played with Ted Harris and studied with composer Josef Schmid. In 37 years teaching at New England Conservatory of Music, his students included John Medeski, Marty Ehrlich, Eyvind Kang, Matana Roberts and Matthew Shipp. According to the New York Times:

He rarely performed outside the academy in the first two decades of his teaching career. But when his son Mat, an accomplished improviser on violin and viola, started to perform in the late 1980s, he encouraged his father, then in his mid-60s, to return to the stage with his saxophone and clarinet. The father and son began playing together, joined by the bassist John Lockwood and the drummer Randy Peterson. The Joe Maneri Quartet developed a cult following in Boston and by 1993 was performing around the world, presenting mysterious and original sets of free improvising, with shades of blues and ballad-style saxophone playing.

== Boston Microtonal Society ==
In 1988, Maneri founded the Boston Microtonal Society, dedicated to microtonal music and tuning. It is currently led by James Bergin and Julia Werntz.

== Discography ==
- Kalavinka (Cochlea, 1989)
- Get Ready to Receive Yourself (Leo, 1995)
- Three Men Walking with Mat Maneri and Joe Morris (ECM, 1996)
- Dahabenzapple (hatART, 1996)
- Let the Horse Go (Leo, 1996)
- In Full Cry (ECM, 1997)
- Coming Down the Mountain (hatOLOGY, 1997)
- Paniots Nine (Avant, 1998)
- Blessed with Mat Maneri (ECM, 1998)
- Tales of Rohnlief with Mat Maneri and Barre Phillips (ECM, 1999)
- Tenderly (hatOLOGY, 1999)
- Out Right Now with Mat Maneri and Joe Morris (hatOLOGY, 2001)
- Voices Lowered (Leo, 2001)
- The Trio Concerts (Leo, 2001)
- Going to Church (AUM Fidelity, 2002)
- Angles of Repose (ECM, 2004)
- Peace Concert with Peter Dolger (Atavistic, 2008)
- Pinerskol with Masashi Harada (Leo, 2009)

With Mat Maneri

- Acceptance (hatOLOGY, 1996)
- Pentagon (Thirsty Ear, 2005)
