= Christian Wolfarth =

Swiss jazz percussion player (born 1960)

- Born: 1960 (age 65–66); Zürich, Switzerland
- Genres: Jazz
- Occupation: Musician
- Instrument: percussion
- Website: christianwolfarth.ch/en/news

Christian Wolfarth (born 1960) is a Swiss jazz percussion player.

== Biography ==
Wolfarth was born in 1960 in Zürich. He moved to Bern in 1981, where he studied under Billy Lewis Brooks at Swiss Jazz School from 1982 to 1986. Then, he studied under Pierre Favre at Konservatorium Luzern (1992–96) and had an education in the field of composing under Siegfried Kutterer in Basel (1995).

He worked with musicians like Christine Sehnaoui, Burkhard Beins, Urs Leimgruber, Jacques Demierre, Enrico Malatesta, Ingar Zach, Evan Parker, Albert Mangelsdorff, Werner Lüdi, Paul Lovens, Norbert Möslang, Alexander von Schlippenbach, Hans Koch, Simon Picard or Jürg Solothurnmann and participated in interdisciplinary projects in the fields of theater, movies, videos, contemporary music and dance (such as Dance-Company of Nina F. Schneider). In 1996, he published his first solo album 3-3-2. After the For4Ears, he published his second solo album Wolfarth in 2005. In 2009, he established his own label, hiddenbell records. His later solo albums were published under this label. In duet formations, he collaborated with Irène Schweizer, Donat Fisch (Circle & Line), Michael Vorfeld (Vorwolf) and also Joke Lanz (Tell). In trios, he played with Jason Kahn and Günter Müller, with Michel Wintsch und Christian Weber (WWW), and also with Tomas Korber and Christian Weber (Mersault). Besides, he worked in a duet with the guitarist Christian Buck.

== Discography ==
- Christian Wolfarth/Franz Aeschbacher Ersatz ist Besser, 1992 Arche Z (AZ CD 002)
- 3-3-2 (8 Pieces for drums) Solo-CD, 1996 Percaso Productions (Percaso 15)
- Momentum 2 The Law of Refraction with Gene Coleman, John Wolf Brennan and Alfred Zimmerlin, 2000 Leo Records (CD LR 296)
- Korber / Weber / Wolfarth Mersault with Tomas Korber and Christian Weber, 2005 Quakebasket (CD 23)
- Weber / Koch / Moser / Siewert / Wolfarth „3 Suits & a Violin“ 2006 (hatOLOGY 634)
- Vorwolf Snake's Eye mit Michael Vorfeld, 2008 formed records (formed 109)
- Fisch / Wolfarth Circle & Line 2 2009 Leo Records (CD LR 552)
- Irmler / Wolfarth Illumination with Hans Joachim Irmler, 2010 Klangbad (LP57)
- Kahn / Müller / Wolfarth Limmat, 2010 Mikroton Records (CD 7)
- acoustic solo percussion vol. 1-4 & Remixes Doppel-CD 2009-2011 hiddenbell records (006/007)
- Wintsch Weber Wolfarth The Holistic Worlds of … 2012 Monotype Records (MonoLP010)
- Wintsch Weber Wolfarth Willisau, 2012 (hatOLOGY 725)
- Scheer Solo-CD cymbals, 2013 hiddenbell records (008)
- Wintsch Weber Wolfarth Thieves Left That Behind, 2015 Veto Exchange (012)
- Spuren Solo-LP percussion, 2016 hiddenbell records (009)
