= John Wolf Brennan =

Irish-Swiss pianist, organist, melodica player, and composer (born 1954)

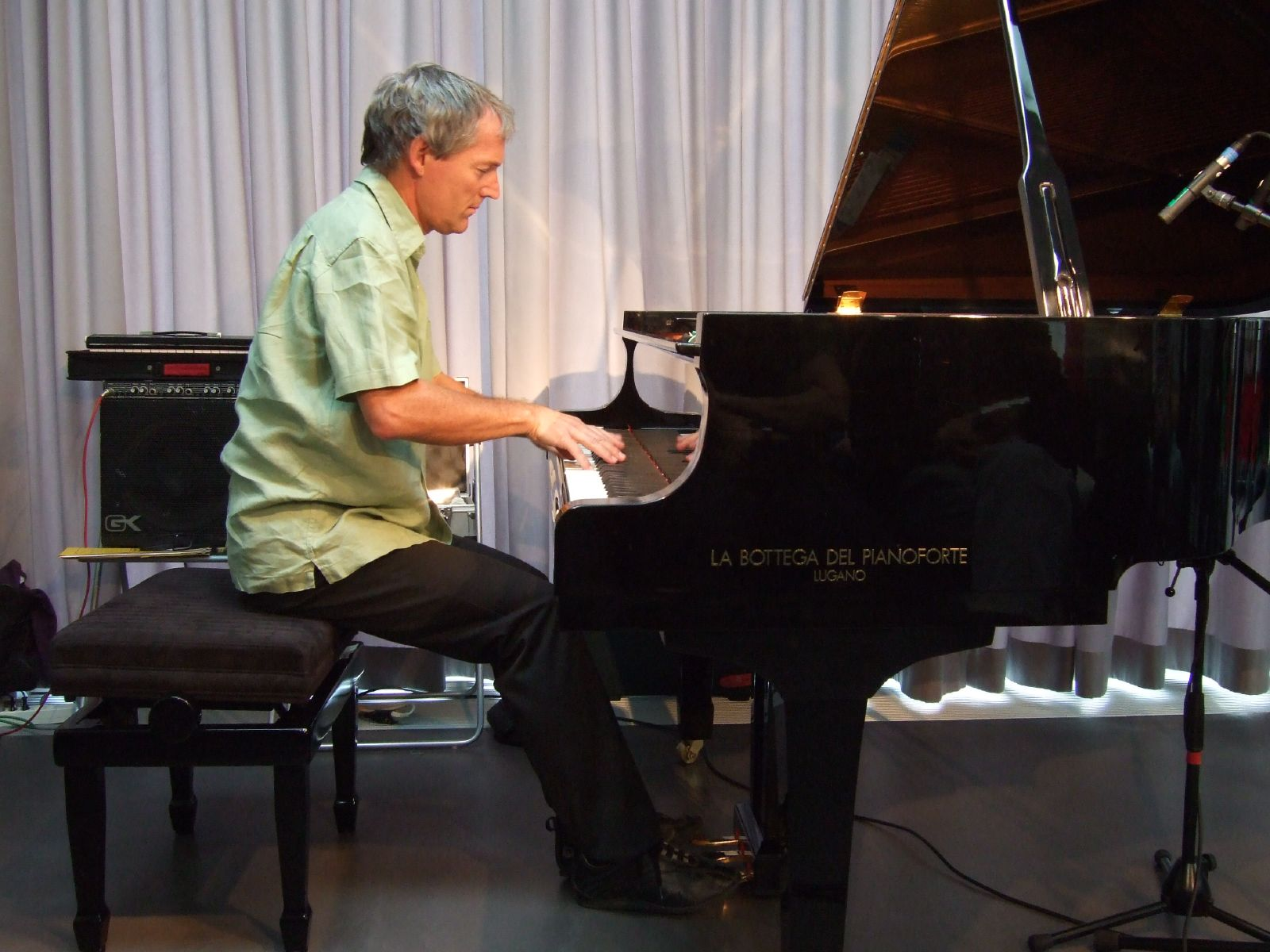
Brennan in 2007

John Wolf Brennan (born 13 February 1954) is an Irish pianist, organist, melodica player, and composer based in Weggis, Switzerland.

== Career ==
Brennan was born in Dublin, Ireland. His family moved to Switzerland when he was seven years old. He began taking piano lessons at age eleven, played bass guitar in a rock band in 1970, and later keyboards in a jazz-rock band. He studied at the University of Fribourg (late 1970s), Swiss Jazz School in Bern (1975–79), the conservatory in Lucerne (1979–84), and the Academy of Church and School Music (1985–87). His brother Peter Wolf, a singer, saxophonist, flautist, and oboist, founded the progressive rock band Flame Dream in 1977. During the same year Brennan founded the free jazz group Freemprovisations, which included Peter Schärli. Two years later he formed the band Impetus.

From 1980 to 1984, he played in Impetus and the Mohrenkopf Afro-jazz band, while also performing in Triumbajo with Ushma Agnes Baumeler and Barni Palm from 1980 to 1982. During the 1980s he also worked with Corin Curschellas, Christy Doran, and Urs Leimgruber. In 1988, he worked in New York City for six months, then founded the quartet Pago Libre the following year.

Early in the 1990s he worked with Lindsay Cooper, Daniele Patumi, and Tscho Theissing and established the SinFONietta ensemble in 1991. In 1993, he worked with American drummer Alex Cline in the quintet Shooting Stars & Traffic Lights. Russian hornist Arkady Shilkloper joined Pago Libre and recorded the albums Pago Libre (1996), Stepping Out (2006), PlatzDADA! (2008) and Fake Folk (2009).

In 1997, he lived in London and worked with Julie Tippetts, Evan Parker, and Chris Cutler in HeXtet, which set to music poems by Seamus Heaney, Edgar Allan Poe, and Theo Dorgan. In 1999 he toured in Finland with Ivo Perelman and worked with Gianluigi Trovesi, Gianni Coscia, and Daniele Patumi in the quartet Euradici.

Brennan worked with clarinetist Gene Coleman for the Momentum albums and with Christy Doran and Patrice Heral in the group Triangulation, where he developed "comprovisation", a term he coined in 1989. He released the solo albums The Beauty of Fractals (1989), Pictures in a Gallery (2006), and The Speed of Dark (2009). Following his album The Well-Prepared Clavier (1998), he developed prepared piano techniques, creating non-electronic sounds such as "arcopiano", "pizzicatopiano", "tamburopiano", and "sordinopiano".

In 2010, he created the sound installation "Inner & Outer Spaces" with video artist Susanne Hofer for the Lucerne Art Museum, performing with Gerry Hemingway and Thomas K. J. Mejer. He was in the trio Melos Montis with Hanspeter Wigger and yodel singer Franziska Wigger and in the duo Twinkeys with Esther Flückiger. He formed the band Sonic Roots with Christy Doran, Andreas Gabriel, Marc Halbheer, Heiri Kaenzig, and Marcel Oetiker.

In 2012, he collaborated with overtone singer Christian Zehnder and Arkady Shilkloper. During the same year he recorded Pilgrims with guitarist Marco Jencarelli and percussionist Tony Majdalani. In 2018, he founded the trio SOOON with Majdalani and yodel singer Sonja Morgenegg.

Brennan has composed film music, chamber music, and the operas Güdelmäntig (2004) and Night.Shift (2007, based on the poem "The Age of Anxiety" by W. H. Auden). The first volume of his Sonic Roots series of books (for piano, inspired by Celtic Country Dances) was premiered at the Frankfurt Book Fair in 2010 and published by Pan-Verlag. The second and third (for violin) were published in 2011, the fourth (for clarinet) in 2013, the fifth (for alto saxophone) in 2014.

The Percussion Art Ensemble Berne premiered his composition "Oscillating Orbits" in 2013 for marimba, vibraphone, timpani, and percussion featuring violinist Misa Stefanovic. In 2015, the Neues Orchester Basel commissioned "Traumpfade", a piece for orchestra and overtone soloist Christian Zehnder. For the 30-year anniversary of the Zurich James Joyce Foundation he wrote "Winds of May" for soprano and piano based on Joyce's Chamber Music IX. He wrote a hymn for his Swiss hometown, Weggis, called "s'Wäggiser Lied". For the Alpentöne Festival 2017, he composed "Got hard", an alpine jazz suite for wind orchestra, Pago Libre & Friends (released by Leo Records in 2018). In August 2018, the Tonhalle Orchester Zürich performed his work Traumpfade with soloists Arkady Shilkloper (alphorn) and Christian Zehnder (overtone voice, global yodeling) at the Festival Stubete am See.

In 2019, he wrote most of the choir arrangements for the program Inland by the Zurich female choir "die vogelfreien". He composed music for the play Fluctus and released the albums Nevergreens, Cinémagique 2.0, and Youchz.

== Discography ==
=== Solo Piano ===
- 1989: The Beauty of Fractals (Creative Works Records)
- 1991: Iritations (Creative Works Records)
- 1994: Text, Context, Co-Text & Co-Co-Text (Creative Works Records)
- 1998: The Well-Prepared Clavier (Creative Works Records) with Marianne Schroeder
- 2002: Flügel (Creative Works Records)
- 2006: Pictures in a Gallery (Leo Records)
- 2009: The Speed of Dark (Leo Records)
- 2012: Solopiano (iTunes Essentials)
- 2017: Silly Blooze. In: Twenty Years of New Blues for Piano. Marcel Worms, Piano (Zefir Records)
- 2019: Nevergreens (Leo Records)
- 2021: Nitty Gritty Ditties (Leo Records) with Anna Murphy
- 2024: Wish you were Hear (t.b.a.) (Leo Records)

=== Pago Libre ===
- 1990: Extempora (Splash Records) with Lars Lindvall, Steve Goodman & Daniele Patumi
- 1993: Shooting Stars and Traffic Lights (Leo Records) with John Voirol, Tscho Theissing, Daniele Patumi & Alex Cline
- 1995: Moskau-Petuschki / Felix-Szenen (Leo Records) with Lars Lindvall, Martin Mayes, Marion Namestnik, Tscho Theissing, Daniele Patumi, Oscar Bingisser & Liana Schwanja
- 1996: Pago Libre. (Leo Records) with Arkady Shilkloper, Tscho Theissing & Daniele Patumi
- 1997: Pago Libre: Wake Up Call: Live In Italy (Leo Records) with Arkady Shilkloper, Tscho Theissing & Daniele Patumi
- 2001: Pago Libre: Cinémagique. (TCB Records) with Arkady Shilkloper, Tscho Theissing & Daniele Patumi
- 2003: Pago Libre: Phoenix: Live in Salzburg & Zurich (Leo Records) with Arkady Shilkloper, Tscho Theissing & Daniele Patumi
- 2005: Pago Libre: Stepping Out (Leo Records) with Arkady Shilkloper, Tscho Theissing, Georg Breinschmid
- 2008: Pago Libre Sextett: platzDADA! (Christoph Merian Verlag) with Agnes Heginger, Arkady Shilkloper, Tscho Theissing, Georg Breinschmid & Patrice Héral
- 2009: Pago Libre: Fake Folk (Zappel Music) with Arkady Shilkloper, Tscho Theissing, Georg Breinschmid & Patrice Héral
- 2018: Pago Libre & Friends: got hard (Leo Records) with Florian Mayer, Arkady Shilkloper, Tom Götze, Patrice Héral, Christy Doran, Christian Zehnder & dem Alpentöne Blasorchester, Leitung: Michel Truniger
- 2019: Pago Libre: Cinémagique 2.0 (Leo Records) with Arkady Shilkloper, Tscho Theissing, Daniele Patumi & Georg Breinschmid
- 2020: Pago Libre Sextet: platzDADA!! (remastered). (Leo Records) with Agnes Heginger, Arkady Shilkloper, Tscho Theissing, Georg Breinschmid & Patrice Héral
- 2020: Pago Libre: Mountain Songlines (Leo Records) with Florian Mayer, Arkady Shilkloper, Tom Götze & Sonja Morgenegg
- 2021: Pago Libre & Sooon: FriendShip (Leo Records) with Sonja Morgenegg, Tony Majdalani, Arkady Shilkloper, Florian Mayer & Rätus Flisch
- 2022: Extempora (Leo Records) with Lars Lindvall, Steve Goodman & Daniele Patumi
- 2024: Pago Libre & Sooon: FriendShip - Riffs ahead! (Leo Records) with Sonja Morgenegg, Tony Majdalani, Arkady Shilkloper, Florian Mayer & Rätus Flisch
- 2025: Pago Libre: Wild Card. Songs from a Farm (Leo Records) with Arkady Shilkloper, Florian Mayer & Rätus Flisch

=== Christy Doran & Triangulation ===
- 1988: Henceforward (Core Records) with Christy Doran
- 1995: Henceforward (Leo Records) with Christy Doran
- 2004: Triangulation (Leo Records) with Christy Doran & Patrice Héral
- 2010: Whirligigs (Leo Records) with Bruno Amstad, Christy Doran & Patrice Héral
- 2018: Pago Libre & Friends: got hard (Leo Records) with Florian Mayer, Arkady Shilkloper, Tom Götze, Patrice Héral, Christy Doran, Christian Zehnder & dem Alpentöne Blasorchester, Leitung: Michel Truniger

=== Pilgrims, SOOON ===
- 2013: Pilgrims (Leo Records) with Tony Majdalani & Marco Jencarelli
- 2017: Pilgrims: Oriental Orbit (Leo Records) with Tony Majdalani & Marco Jencarelli
- 2019: SOOON: YouCHz Now (Narrenschiff) with Sonja Morgenegg & Tony Majdalani
- 2024: Pilgrims in Trance it (Narrenschiff) with Tony Majdalani & Marco Jencarelli

=== Momentum ===
- 1999: Momentum (Leo Records) with Gene Coleman & Christian Wolfarth
- 2000: Momentum 2 – The Law of Refraction (Leo Records) with Gene Coleman, Alfred Zimmerlin & Christian Wolfarth
- 2002: Momentum 3 (Leo Records) with Bertrand Denzler, Christian Weber & Christian Wolfarth
- 2005: Momentum 4 – Rising Fall (Leo Records) with Gene Coleman, Thomas Mejer & Marc Unternährer

=== Urs Leimgruber ===
- 1986: Mountain Hymn (Bellaphon Records) with Urs Leimgruber
- 1988: An Chara (Bellaphon Records) with Urs Leimgruber
- 1989: Polyphyllum (Bellaphon Records) with Urs Leimgruber
- 1990: M.A.P. (Music for Another Planet) (Bellaphon Records) with Norma Winstone und Urs Leimgruber
- 1991: Live at Montreux ’89 (B&W Music) with Urs Leimgruber
- 1992: Blue Jazz – Live at Montreux (B&W Music) with Urs Leimgruber

=== Daniele Patumi ===
- 1993: TEN ZENtences (Bellaphon Records) with Daniele Patumi
- 1997: Aurealis (Les Disques Victo) with Robert Dick & Daniele Patumi
- 2002: Time Jumps – Space cracks (Leo Records) with Daniele Patumi

=== Various ===
- 1979: Opening Seed (Zytglogge) with Agnes Ushma Baumeler, Mark Zingg, Bianca Medici & Fausto Medici
- 1980: Celtic Country Dances (Bimbo Records) with Agnes Ushma Baumeler
- 1981: Triumbajo (Bimbo Records) with Agnes Ushma Baumeler & Barni Palm
- 1983: Down to Earth (Plainisphare) with Marco Käppeli, Ushma Agnes Baumeler, Thomas Dürst & Jürg Burkhard
- 1988: Entupadas (Creative Works Records) with Corin Curschellas
- 1993: Willisau live and more (Creative Works Records) with Creative Works Orchestra (Lindsay Cooper e.a.)
- 1994: OrganIC VoICes (Leo Records) with Gabriele Hasler, Peter Schärli & Christian Muthspiel
- 1998: HeXtet: Through the Ear of a Raindrop (Leo Records) with Julie Driscoll, Evan Parker, Paul Rutherford, Chris Cutler & Peter Whyman
- 1999: Minute Age (For4ears Records) with Margrit Rieben & Reto Senn
- 1999: Nisajo (FMR Records) with Nicky Heinen & Alexander Alexandrov
- 2000: Pipelines (Leo Records) with Hans Kennel
- 2000: Entropology – The Science of Sonic Poetry (For4Ears Records) with Eddie Prévost & Simon Picard
- 2002: Broken Dreams live (Creative Works Records) with Alexandra Prusa, Hans Kennel & Marc Unternährer
- 2003: klanggang (Creative Works Records)
- 2003: Glockenspiel (Altrisuoni Records)
- 2003: Zero Heroes (Leo Records) with Peggy Lee & Dylan van der Schyff
- 2004: Pipelines – Live at Lucerne Festival (Creative Works Records) with Hans Kennel & Marc Unternährer
- 2004: I.N.I.T.I.A.L.S. (Creative Works Records) with Urs Blöchlinger, Peter Schärli, Lindsay Cooper, Steve Argüelles, Christy Doran, Urs Leimgruber, Marco Käppeli e.a.
- 2004: Sculpted Sound (Altrisuoni Records) with Magda Vogel, Charlotte Hug, Shirley Anne Hofmann, Eugen Gomringer & Christian Wolfarth
- 2007: Broken Dreams: Hommage an Sophie Taeuber-Arp (Narrenschiff) with Alexandra Prusa & Peter Gossweiler
- 2007: Mein liebstes Krokodil: after Anton Chekhov The Lady with the little Dog and letters to and from Olga Knipper (Christoph Merian Verlag) with Thomas Hürlimann & Arkady Shilkloper
- 2008: Jodel Vol. 1 (Mülirad Verlag Altdorf) with Nadja Räss & Franziska Wigger
- 2009: Klick, klick, ihr Sätzlinge (Christoph Merian Verlag) with Eveline Hasler
- 2012: POYA (edition therme vals) with Daniel Mezger
- 2012: Tarkus & Other Love Stories (Leo Records) Piano-Duo TwinKeys (Esther Flückiger & John Wolf Brennan)
- 2014: Dehei nöd dehei (Trio Zehnder/Brennan/Shilkloper) with Christian Zehnder & Arkady Shilkloper
- 2016: MODE (Naturton 1986–2016) with Gérard Widmer, Fujara & Willi Grimm, Didjeridu
- 2016: Echo. Von der Suche nach Widerhall. Feature by Bettina Mittelstrass, with Christian Zehnder & John Wolf Brennan. Featureprice 2016 (Christoph Merian Verlag)
- 2023: Klanglabor feat. John Wolf Brennan (Vinyl; Little Big Beat) with Arno Oehri, Denise Kronabitter & Marco Sele
- 2024: Percussion Art Ensemble Bern & Misa Stefanovic: Grenzgänger Works by Fred Frith, John Wolf Brennan & Siegfried Kutterer
- 2025: Night in Gale (Leo Records) with Arkady Shilkloper, Christian Zehnder & Marcello Wick

=== Groupe Lacroix ===
- 1997: The Composer Group (Creative Works Records) with Moscow Rachmaninov Trio
- 1999: Arpiade (edition edex) with Barbara Sutter, Béatrice Wolf & Michael Wolf
- 2003: 8 Pieces on Paul Klee (Creative Works Records) with Ensemble Sortisatio Leipzig
