= Christian Weber (double bass player) =

Swiss double bass player (born 1972)

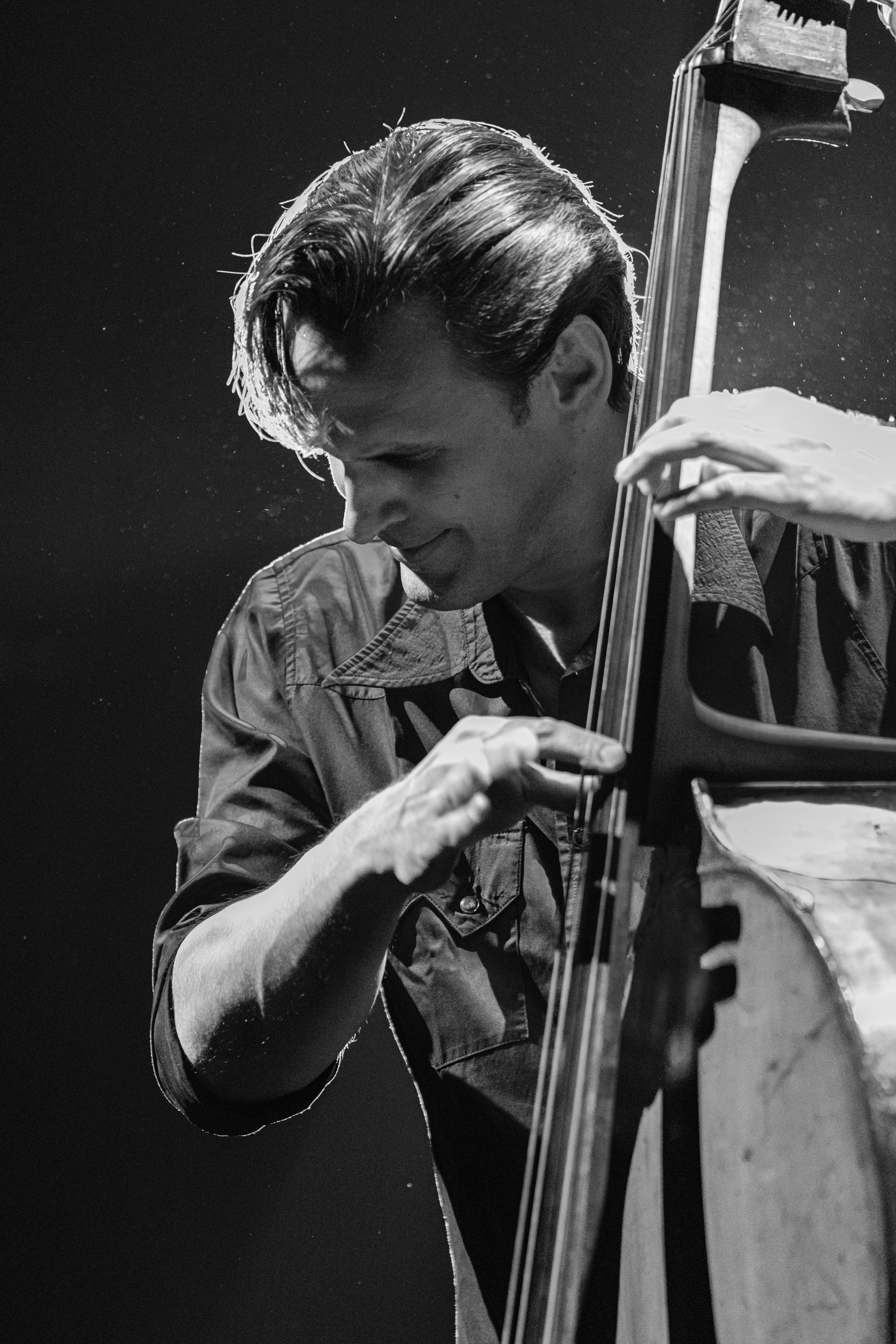
- Solo at Jazzfestival Schaffhausen 2021

Background information
- Born: 1972 (age 53–54); Zürich, Switzerland
- Genres: free improvisation, jazz
- Occupation: Musician
- Instruments: double bass; bass guitar
- Website: christianweber.org//

Christian Weber (born 1972) is a Swiss double bass player. He is especially well known in the field of free improvisation and jazz.

== Life and works ==
Weber was born in 1972 in Zürich. In 1990, Weber began playing double bass. After taking private lessons in Zürich, he moved to Graz in 1993 for studying at the academy of music and performing arts. Simultaneously, he started studying under Aderhard Roidinger at Anton Bruckner Private University for Music, Drama, and Dance.

His education at this university lasted to 1998. His study was replaced by the classical lessons of the double bass player Ernst Weissensteiner.

At present, Weber lives in Zürich and plays in the various projects like WAL with Joke Lanz (turntables) and Bruno Amstad (voc), the trios with Chris Wiesendanger (p) and Dieter Ulrich or Claudia Ulla Binder (p) and Dieter Ulrich as well as WWW with Michel Wintsch and Christian Wolfarth (dr) and Mersault with Tomas Korber (guit/elec) and Christian Wolfarth.

In 2001, he received a composition order from Pro Helvetia and composed a quintet, which he performed with Hans Koch (sax/elec) Martin Siewert (guit/elec), Michel Moser (vel) and Christian Wolfarth.

He also collaborated in the sextet respectively quartet of Co Streiff, The space researcher, Neuromodulator and also in a trio by Philipp Schaufelberger, Sudden Infant as well as in Steamboat Switzerland and in many others. He also devoted his time to the contemporary composed music. Weber, who was the manager of the secretariat of the workshop for improvised music (WIM) Zürich from 2000 to 2006, performed together with many musicians of the European improvisation scenes like Peter Kowald, Irène Schweizer, Werner Lüdi, Lol Coxhill, Wolfgang Reisinger, Stephan Wittwer, Nils Wogram, Phil Minton, Wolfgang Puschnig, Julian Argüelles, Michael Griener, Johannes Bauer, Evan Parker or Michael Thieke. He also appeared with Charles Gayle, Robert Dick, Tom Varner, Joachim Kühn, Otomo Yoshihide, Elliott Sharp, Simon Nabatov, John Butcher or Lina Allemano.

He took part also in many festivals in Europe. He went on a tour in Israel, China, Taiwan, Kuwait, Japan and the United States.
