= Chris Wiesendanger =

- Born: 11 October 1965 (age 60); Zürich, Switzerland
- Genres: Jazz
- Occupation: Musician
- Instruments: Piano, keyboards
- Website: wiesendangermusic.ch

Chris Wiesendanger (born 11 October 1965) is a Swiss jazz pianist.

== Biography ==
Wiesendanger took classical piano lessons for ten years, when he was a child. He founded his own first professional band at the age of 16. Later, he worked with Jürg Grau, Koni Weber, Herbie Kopf and Elmar Frey. In Jazzclub Bazillus in Zürich, he played with musicians like Eddie Harris, Ray Anderson, Lester Bowie, Michael Brecker or Carmen McRae. Besides, his performances with his own band increased in international festivals such as North Sea Jazz Festival, Montreux Jazz Festival and JVC Festival New York. He performed also in Australia and Japan. Wiesendanger studied composition, theory and piano in New York City at the Juilliard School. During the education, he worked with musicians in the New York Jazz scene such as Jim Black, Joshua Redman or Mark Turner. He has worked with two different trios for a long time; the trio with Christian Weber and Dieter Ulrich and also the trio with Dominique Girod (double bass) and Christian Wolfarth (percussion).

IN 2004, he founded his nonet Undersong and composed for this ensemble. His compositions were played also by Lucerne Jazz Orchestra. Besides, he was also the leader of the group Urban Village. He plays also in a duet with Jürg Wickihalder and is a member of Co Streiff's sextet.

Wiesendanger teaches at the Lucerne University of Applied Sciences and Arts and Zurich University of the Arts.
