= Béatrice Graf =

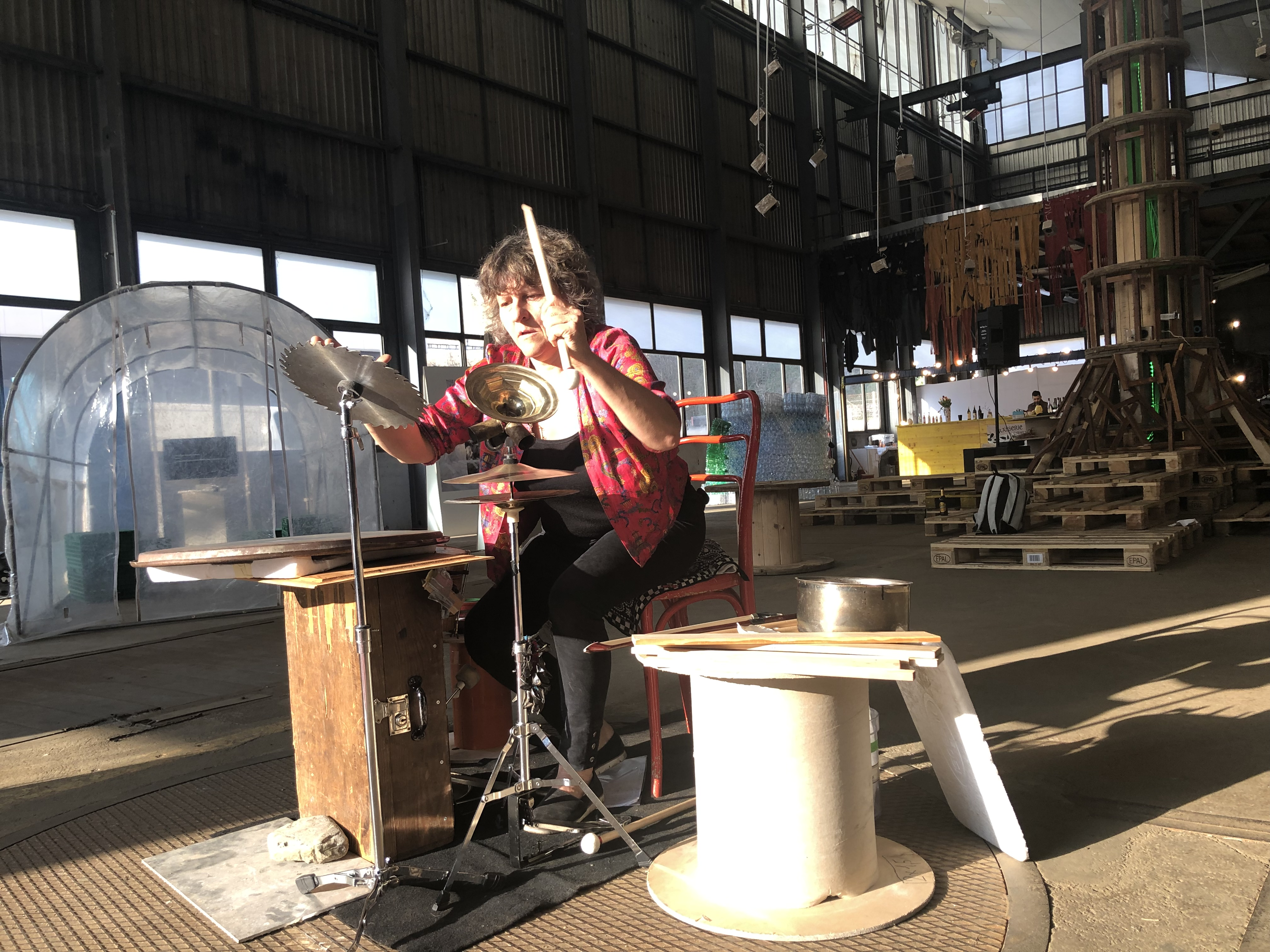

Background information
- Born: 2 April 1964 (age 60); Nyon, Switzerland
- Genres: jazz fusion and modern jazz
- Occupation: Musician
- Instrument(s): percussion, organ, keyboard

Béatrice Graf (2 April 1964) is a Swiss percussionist, organist and keyboard player of jazz fusion and modern jazz.

== Biography ==
Graf studied at the Conservatoire Populaire de Musique de Genève until 1989 and finished the workshop of Jack DeJohnette, Han Bennink, Peter Erskine and Dave Holland. Since 1992, she has worked as a professional musician also in the genre of Rock music and the free improvisation. She has been the member of Peter Schärli's sextet and the member of the ensemble Four Roses for a long time. She is also the leader of her own group and played in duo with musician like Philippe Ehinger (Beat and Lip), Helene Corini, Michel Wintsch, Vinz Volanthan, Jan Gordon Lenox and Guillaume Perret. She performs also as a soloist. She works with Co Streiff, Hilaria Kramer and Karoline Höfler in the quartet Retrabra. The other musicians, whom she has performed with, are James Zollar, James Carter, Tom Varner, Steffen Schorn, Al Grey junior, Amampondo, the Orchestre National du Sénégal, Darius Brubeck and Matthew Brubeck, Corin Curschellas, Hélène Labarrière, Sylvie Courvoisier, Jacques Demierre, Ohad Talmor, Erik Truffaz, Hilde Kappes und Philippe Aerts. She has performed in the international festivals and has given concerts in the Switzerland, Austria, Czech Republic, Germany, Italy, Belgium, Britain, France, Liechtenstein, Russia, North America and Latin America and Africa.

== Discography ==
- Peter Schärli Special Sextet feat. Glenn Ferris and Tom Varner: Hot Peace (2006)
- Beat and Lip (Altrisuoni 2003)
- Four Roses: Histoire d’eau (Altrisuoni, 2001, with Florence Chitacumbi, Florence Melnotte, and Karoline Höfler)
