= Peter Schärli =

Swiss jazz trumpeter (born 1955)

- Born: May 29, 1955 (age 69); Schötz, Switzerland
- Genres: Jazz
- Occupation: Musician
- Instrument: Trumpet
- Website: www.schaerlimusic.ch

Peter Schärli (29 May 1955) is a Swiss jazz trumpeter.

== Biography ==
When he was ten years old, he started to learn trumpet. He continued his studies at the Lucern jazz school while working as a clerk. He joined the blues band Exodus as a singer, pianist, and trumpeter in 1974. From 1977 to 1981, he attended the Swiss jazz school in Bern and graduated with a master's degree. He worked with Urs Blöchlinger and John Wolf Brennan.

In 1982, he formed a trio with Marco Kappeli and Thomas Durst. The group expanded to a quartet with the addition of Hans Koch and guitarist Giancarlo Nicolai. Koch's place was taken by Roland Philipp, and Glenn Ferris also became a member. In 1994, the Peter Schärli Special sextet was formed with Ferris, Tom Varner, Dürst, Hans Feigenwinter, and Béatrice Graf.

Schärli has worked with Johannes Bauer, Christy Doran, Rick Margitza, Co Streiff, Gerry Hemingway, Paul Rutherford, Werner Lüdi, and Dom Um Romão.

He also performed in several circuses like Federlos. Since 1981, Schärli has been teaching at the Lucerne School of Music. He is the son of the previous member of the Swiss National Council, Hans Schärli (1925–2014).

== Awards ==
In the jazz poll of the Brazilian daily newspaper Tribuna da Imprensa Schärli was chosen trumpeter of the year 2006.
