= Bruno Amstad =

Swiss singer (1964–2024)

- Born: 1964; Stans, Switzerland
- Died: 25 January 2024 (aged 59–60)
- Genres: Jazz, improvisation
- Occupation: Singer
- Formerly of: Christy Doran, Hans-Peter Pfammatter, Dominik Burkhalter, Paul McCandless, Fredy Studer, Phil Minton, Lauren Newton, John Zorn, Christian Weber/Joke Lanz, DJ Olive
- Website: brunoamstad.com

Bruno Amstad (1964 – 25 January 2024) was a Swiss singer in the field of improvisation and jazz.

== Life and career ==
Amstad was at first a soul, funk and rock singer in the 80s. Then, he changed his genre to jazz and world music. Christy Doran took him in his project New Bag. He was active in the project for twelve years (with Wolfgang Zwiauer, Fabian Kuratli, Hans-Peter Pfammatter, Dominik Burkhalter, and Vincent Membrez). In this project, seven albums were created from 1999 to 2011.

Also, he sang in Asita Hamidi's group, Bazaar. He became an important figure in world music in Switzerland. He belonged to Sandro Schneebeli's international project, Scala Mobile (along with Antonello Messina and Paul McCandless).

In the last twenty years, Amstad has collaborated with several bands and projects in more than fifty countries. Among the musicians whom he has worked with, can be mentioned Fredy Studer, Phil Minton, Lauren Newton, John Zorn, Christian Weber/Joke Lanz, DJ Olive or Martin Baumgartner. In recent years, Amstad has performed more in theatre, movie and radio projects. He has cooperated with the Werkstatt für Theater Luzern for several years. Also, he has worked with Albin Brun for the theatre.

Amstad died of cancer on 25 January 2024.
