= Martin Schütz =

Martin Schütz may refer to:

- Martin Schütz (musician)
- Martin Schütz (theoretical chemist)
