= Caspar Diethelm =

Swiss composer (1926–1997)

Caspar Diethelm (31 March 1926 – 1 January 1997) was a Swiss composer.

== Education ==
Born in Lucerne, Diethelm studied at the Conservatory and the School of Church Music there (now both divisions of the Lucerne Musikhochschule). He studied composition privately with Johann Baptist Hilber (1891–1973) and Albert Jenny, and took master classes with Paul Hindemith and Arthur Honegger, which had a significant influence on him, in addition to summer courses in Darmstadt with Karlheinz Stockhausen and Luigi Nono. He completed his education as a conductor with Ernst Hans Beer and Alexander Krannhals.

== Career ==
From 1963 to 1993 he worked as a docent in music history, topics in music theory, composition and chamber music at the Lucerne Conservatory. At the same time he conducted his own works at home and abroad, as well as giving numerous lectures and writing well received essays.

== Works ==
Diethelm composed some 343 works in his lifetime, amongst them over 100 for full orchestra, chamber orchestra and string orchestra including eight symphonies, concertos for almost every instrument and a ballet; 40 works for choir with orchestra, instrumental ensemble or organ, including three oratorios and numerous cantatas; several works for a capella choir, including several masses and motets; more than 20 works for wind ensemble and brass band; and an extensive repertoire of chamber works ranging from solo instrumental pieces to nonettes and including six string quartets, solo sonatas for all instruments, 22 piano sonatas, and numerous works for unusual combinations of instruments.

In addition to works which make great demands on the performer and the listener, he also composed numerous works for amateurs, such as the Concerti Diletti for amateur string orchestra, choral and song works and masses for amateur choirs; and chamber and piano works for instructional use. He also made numerous arrangements and reconstructions of other composers' works, such as the Flute Concerto by F. X. Stalder, the Sinfonia Concertante by Constantin Reindl, quintet arrangements for clarinet and string quartet, and arrangements for string quintet of works by Mozart.

== Style ==
Diethelm's sonic palette is highly distinctive, and through its expressivity and vitality has an immediate impact on the listener. The composer engaged intensively with the latest tendencies in music, including twelve-tone music, atonality, serialism and aleatorics, but always rejected the constraints of dogmatism. Instead, he developed his own characteristic style, influenced by Jenny, Hindemith, Honneger and Hans Martin.

His music is characterised by Swiss elements and generally pursues a broad melodic linearity. Harmonically, he uses free tonality; his rhythms are sometimes elementary, characterised by a strong impulse towards the dance and a preference for large, uneven cycles. He placed great importance on the use of predictable, completable forms, such as the sonata form with its basis in duality, the Lied, the rondo, arched and embedded structures; however, within these he always sought individual and variable solutions.

In his later works, he turned to a more meditative approach, greater spirituality, and influences from non-European music and modes of thought. In this light he has been referred to as "someone who dealt cleverly with psychic phenomena [including] in his compositions." One example is his 1987 chamber music work Das Rad des Lebens (the wheel of life).

== Honours ==
- 1969: Obwalden Art Prize
- 1985: City of Lucerne Art Prize
