= Martin Siewert =

German guitarist and film composer (born 1972)

- Born: 11 May 1972 (age 53); Saarbrücken, Germany
- Genres: Avant-garde, electronic
- Occupation: Musician
- Instrument: Guitar
- Years active: 1995–present
- Labels: Extraplatte
- Website: siewert.klingt.org

Martin Siewert (born 11 May 1972) is a German guitarist and film composer.

== Career ==
Siewert has been living in Vienna since the age of 10. He studied guitar at the University of Music and Performing Arts Graz. As a guitarist, he started his public performances in 1995. In his early performances, he played with Herwig Gradischnig, Freier Fall, Franz Hautzinger, and his band Duckbilled Platypus. With this band, he recorded two albums for the label Extraplatte.

He began to separated himself from the jazz idiom and developed an abstract sound on guitar. He became a member of Efzeg with Burkhard Stangl and Hauf and Komfort. He invited Dafeldecker, Hinteregger, Wayne Horvitz and Tony Buck to the group Komfort. In the group Trapist, he played with Joe Williamson and Martin Brandlmayr. On My Kingdom for a Lullably, he played with Christof Kurzmann, Axel Dörner, and Billy Roisz, the video artist of Efzeg. He was a member of the guitar quartet SSSD with Taku Sugimoto, Werner Dafeldecker, and Burkhard Stangl.

He has worked with Oskar Aichinger, Christian Fennesz, Wolfgang Mitterer, Elliott Sharp, Franz Koglmann, Thomas Lehn, Karlheinz Essl, Ken Vandermark, Michael Sarin, Jamaaladeen Tacuma, Kammerflimmer Kollektief, Georg Gräwe, Frank Gratkowski, Michael Vatcher, and Klangforum Wien. He has composed music for, ballet, film, theater, remix recordings, and sound art.

== Discography ==
- Komfort 2000 (Charhizma, 1999)
- Dafeldecker/Kurzmann/Fennesz/O'Rourke/Drumm/Siewert (Charhizma, 1999)
- Just In Case You Are Bored. So Are We. (dOc recordings, 2002)
- Highway My Friend (hatOLOGY, 2002)
- Die Instabilität Der Symmetrie (dOc recordings, 2003)
- Too Beautiful to Burn (Erstwhile, 2003)
- No Need to Be Lonesome (Mosz, 2004)
- 3 Suits and a Violin with Christian Weber, Michael Moser, Hans Koch, Christian Wolfarth, (hatOLOGY, 2006)
- (Fake) The Facts (Editions Mego, 2011)
- The Peeled Eye (Shameless, 2015)
- Live at Wirr (Trost, 2016)
- Hoverload (Chmafu Nocords, 2016)
