= Vich =

Vich may refer to:

== Places ==
- Vich, Switzerland
- Vich de Fascia, the Ladin name for Vigo di Fassa, Italy
- Vich, Spain, the Spanish form of Catalan Vic

== People ==
- Jaume Martinez Vich (born 1993), Spanish professional pickleball player
- '-vich', an East Slavic patronymic suffix
