= Christy Doran =

Jazz guitarist (born 1949)

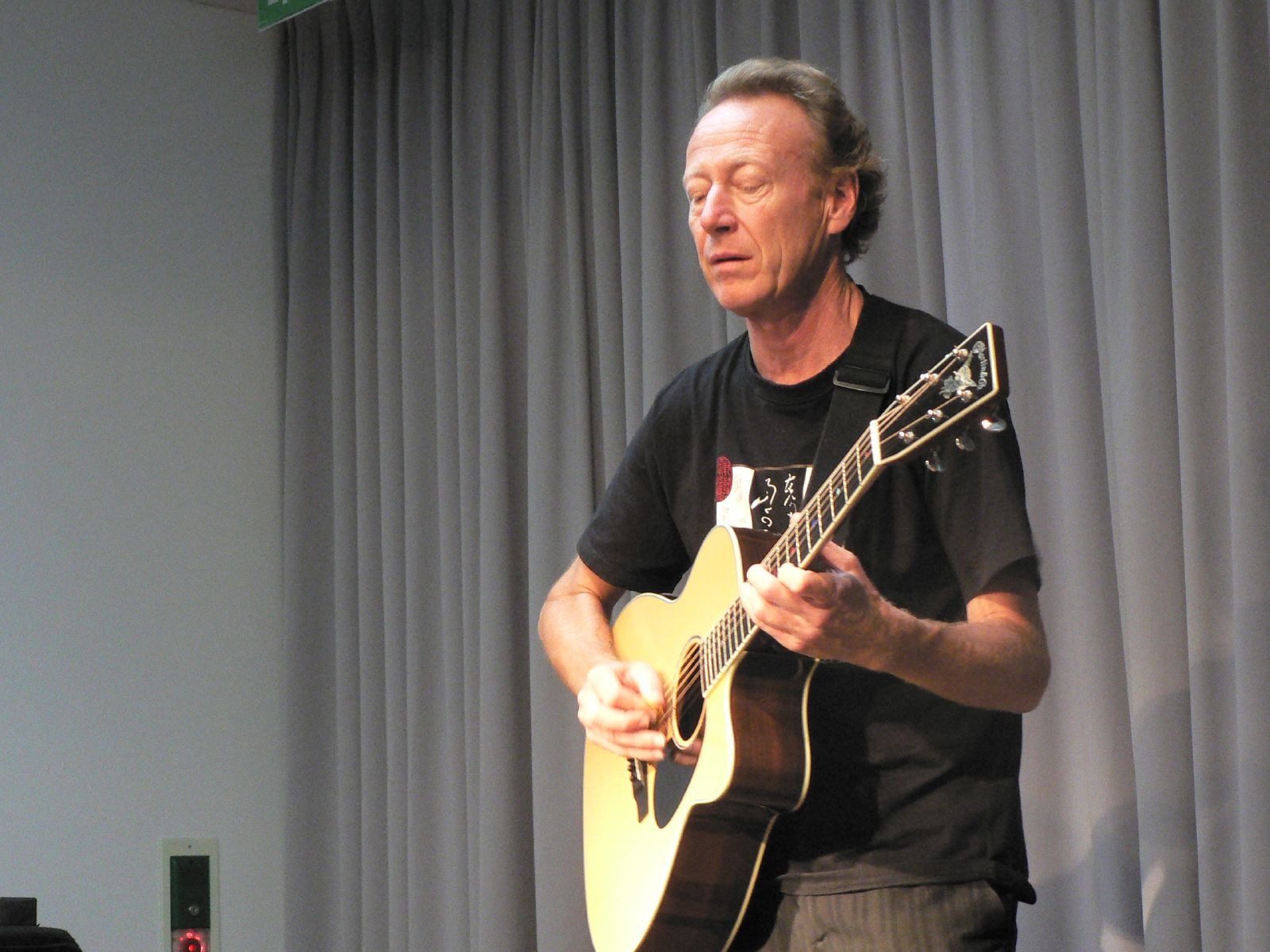
- Doran in 2007

Background information
- Born: 1949 (age 76–77); Dublin, Ireland
- Genre: Avant-garde jazz
- Occupation: Musician
- Instrument: Guitar
- Labels: ECM, Plainisphare, Challenge, Synton, hat art, Unit, Leo
- Formerly of: OM

Christy Doran (born 1949) is a jazz guitarist born in Dublin, Ireland, and raised in Lucerne, Switzerland.

Doran founded OM with Fredy Studer, Urs Leimgruber, and Bobby Burri in the 1970s; this ensemble recorded for ECM. He and Studer also worked on a Jimi Hendrix tribute project in the 1990s. Doran has worked with free jazz and avant-garde jazz musicians such as Marty Ehrlich, Robert Dick, Ray Anderson, Han Bennink, Albert Mangelsdorff, Louis Sclavis, Marilyn Mazur, Herb Robertson, John Wolf Brennan, Patrice Héral, Jamaaladeen Tacuma, Phil Minton, Joe McPhee and Carla Bley. Doran founded New Bag in 1997 and toured the world from 1998 to 2000 with the ensemble. Doran has taught at the Musikhochschule Luzern since 1990.

== Discography ==
=== As leader ===
- Harsh Romantics (Synton, 1984)
- Christy Doran's May 84 (1985)
- The Returning Dream of the Leaving Ship (1986)
- Red Twist & Tuned Arrow (ECM, 1987)
- Henceforward (Line Music/Core, 1989)
- Christy Doran's Phoenix (hatArt, 1990)
- Corporate Art (JMT, 1991)
- Musik für zwei Kontrabässe, elektrische Gitarre und Schlagzeug (ECM, 1991)
- What a Band (Hathut, 1992)
- Play the Music of Jimi Hendrix (Call It Anything/Intuition, 1995)
- Race the Time (1997)
- Shaman (M.E.L.T., 2000)
- Black Box (2002)
- Heaven Is Back in the Streets (Double Moon, 2003)
- Triangulation (Leo, 2004)
- Confusing the Spirits (2004)
- Perspectives (Between the Lines, 2005)
- Jimi (Challenge, 2005)
- La Fourmi (2005)
- Now's the Time (2006)
- The Competence of the Irregular (Between the Lines, 2009)
- Triangulation: Whirligigs (Leo, 2010)
- Aerosols (Challenge/Between The Lines, 2021)

=== Collaborations ===
- No. 9 (Leo, 2013) with Yang Jing
- Christy Doran's Sound Fountain – Belle Epoque (Between the Lines, 2016)
- Call Me Helium (Double Moon, 2016) with Jamaaladeen Tacuma, Fredy Studer, Erika Stucky
- Kontaktchemie (Boomslang Records, 2016) with Alfred Vogel
- Glacial Voyage (Challenge/Between The Lines 2025) with Izumi Kimura

=== As sideman ===
With Ray Anderson and Han Bennink

- Azurety (hat ART, 1994)
- Cheer Up (hat ART, 1995)

With Joe McPhee

- Linear B (Hat Hut, 1990)
