= Hans-Peter Pfammatter =

Swiss jazz pianist and composer (born 1974)

- Born: 1974 (age 51–52); Sierre, Switzerland
- Genres: Jazz, rock, pop
- Occupation: Musician
- Instrument: piano

Hans-Peter Pfammatter (1974 in Sierre) is a Swiss jazz pianist and composer.

Pfammatter played as a child at first trumpet. At the age of thirteen, he changed to piano. He played in several rock, pop and jazz bands and studied from 1995 until 1999 at the jazz school of Luzern. then, he played in the recordings of Bänz Oester, Gilbert Paeffgen and Werner Hasler and appeared in the concerts of Corin Curschellas, Ray Anderson, Christy Doran, Fredy Studer, Tony Overwater, Fee Claasen, Brad Dutz and Alexander Sipiagin.

In 2001, he became a member of Christy Doran's group, New Bag. Along with the clarinet player Lucien Dubuis, the bass player Urban Lienert and percussion player Lionel Friedli, he founded the group Scope. The group published the album Nu Gara in 2007.

At the same time, he composed music for dramas and plays such as Tag des Jammers with Peter Schärli and for short movies and radio plays. He composed also for several string quartets.

== Discography ==
- Bänz Oester Quintet: Max, 1999
- The Wild Bunch: Ghosts, 2001
- New Bag: Heaven Is Black In The Street, 2002
- New Bag: Perspectives, 2004
- Christy Doran, Fritz Hauser, Urs Leimgruber: Fourmi, 2005
- New Bag: Now's The Time, 2005
- Lila: Lila, 2007
- Scope: Nu Gara, 2007
