= Wyl =

Wyl, or WYL, may refer to:

- Wyl Menmuir (1979–), author of the novel The Many, longlisted for the 2016 Man Booker Prize
- WYL, the National Rail code for Wylde Green railway station in the West Midlands, UK
- Luzia von Wyl (born 1985), Swiss pianist and composer
