= Pfammatter =

Pfammatter is a surname. Notable people with the surname include:

- Hans-Peter Pfammatter (born 1974), Swiss jazz pianist and composer
- Kurt Pfammatter (1941–2022), Swiss ice hockey player
