= Festival of New Trumpet Music =

- Genre: Jazz, free jazz, classical, rock, hip hop
- Dates: August, September, October
- Location(s): New York City
- Years active: 2003–present
- Founders: Dave Douglas
- Website: fontmusic.org

The Festival of New Trumpet Music (FONT Music) is a nonprofit organization founded by jazz trumpeter Dave Douglas to encourage aspiring trumpeters. The annual festival consists of concerts and workshops over a two to three week period in New York City in September. FONT also gives an Award of Recognition to a distinguished trumpeter who has made an important contribution to the instrument.

== History ==
The first took place at the downtown music venue Tonic in August 2003 and presented 40 performances with trumpeters representing jazz, free jazz, hip hop, rock, improvisational, and classical music. During the next year, the festival expanded into other venues, such as the New York Baháʼí Center, the 14th Street Y, and Makor. The second festival featured trumpeter Bill Dixon and performances by the 22-member Trumpet Nation led by Butch Morris. The third annual FONT Music, held in August 2005, provided a week-long celebration of Lester Bowie at the Jazz Standard and an expansion of educational and performance opportunities for students and aspiring musicians. Jon Nelson joined Dave Douglas and Roy Campbell Jr. as co-directors of the festival and oversaw the creation of an advisory board.

The fifth annual Festival of New Trumpet Music began on September 15, 2007 and continued until September 30 with performances at the Manhattan School of Music, Jazz Standard, Blue Note, Cornelia St. Cafe, Tea Lounge, St. Mark's Church in-the-Bowery, and Barbes.

FONT Music 2007 welcomed Ralph Alessi, Anthony Braxton, Cecil Bridgewater, Robert Erickson, John McNeil, Jeremy Pelt, the Taylor Haskins Experiment, Kirk Knuffke, Matt Lavelle Spiritual Power Trio, Macroquarktet, Jason Palmer, Jason Price, Huang Ruo, and the Kenny Wollesen Big Band.

In 2008, the Festival presented a celebration of Louis Armstrong, Woody Shaw, and Wadada Leo Smith, and performances by Avishai Cohen, Amir ElSaffar, Mark Isham, Ingrid Jensen, Frank London, John McNeill, and Jeremy Pelt. This festival also displayed works by Chris DiMeglia, Nabaté Isles, and Reut Regev and the Brassix Ensemble.

The seventh annual FONT Music Festival in 2009 included performances at the Jazz Standard and Cornelia St Cafe, lessons with Laurie Frink, and a workshop with John McNeill. There were performances by Ambrose Akinmusire, RJ Avallone, Bobby Bradford, Thomas Heberer, Eddie Henderson, Russ Johnson, Jordan McLean, Leron Thomas, and James Zollar.

FONT Music 2010 included performances on the Lower East Side and in Brooklyn in October and January. The following musicians were featured in October: Lina Allemano, Josh Deutsch, Brad Henkel, Kirk Knuffke, Matt Lavelle, Brad Mason, Nick Roseboro, and Ben Syverson. In January, FONT celebrated the live and career of Wilmer Wise with a performance and a workshop. Several trumpet ensembles and workshops in Abelton Live and group improvisation also took place.

The ninth annual Festival of New Trumpet Music in 2011 celebrated Kenny Wheeler and Bill Dixon. It featured performances by Jonathan Finlayson, John Hollenbeck, Ingrid Jensen, Stephanie Richards, Tomasz Stanko, and Kenny Wheeler

FONT Music 2012 was the tenth anniversary festival and featured a month of concerts throughout September. Performances occurred at the Jazz Gallery, Smalls Jazz Club, and Rockwood Music Hall. Performers included No BS Brass Band, Adam O'Farrill, Alicia Rau, John Raymond, Claudio Roditi, Natsuki Tamura, Tilt Brass, Charles Tolliver, Jack Walrath, David Weiss, and the West Point Jazz Knights.

In 2013, The Festival of New Trumpet Music presented Music for Small, Medium and Massive: Premieres, Fanfares and Remembrance from September 10 to October 2. This festival included many premieres and commissions including a 52 trumpet piece. Musicians included Roy Cambell Jr., Matt Holman, and John Zorn.

The 2014 Festival of New Trumpet Music featured over 15 performances and workshops in September at the Smoke Jazz and Supper Club, Village Zendo, Cornelia St Café, Mannes, New School, St Peter's Church, Littlefield, Ibeam, and Rockwood Music Hall. The festival included workshops and demonstrations by Blast of Brass and Jesse Neuman, Josh Landress, and a panel discussion on Brass Music in the 21st century. FONT Music awarded Raymond Mase with the Award of Recognition for his career and work with the American Brass Quintet. Performances included appearances by the American Brass Quintet, Practical Trumpet Society, New School Alumni Trumpet Round Robin, Banda de los Muertos, FONT's own Afro-Brass Assembly, No BS Brass Band, Graham Haynes, Carlos Abadie, Tim Hagans, and Aaron Shragge.
