= Lina Allemano =

Canadian musician (born 1973)

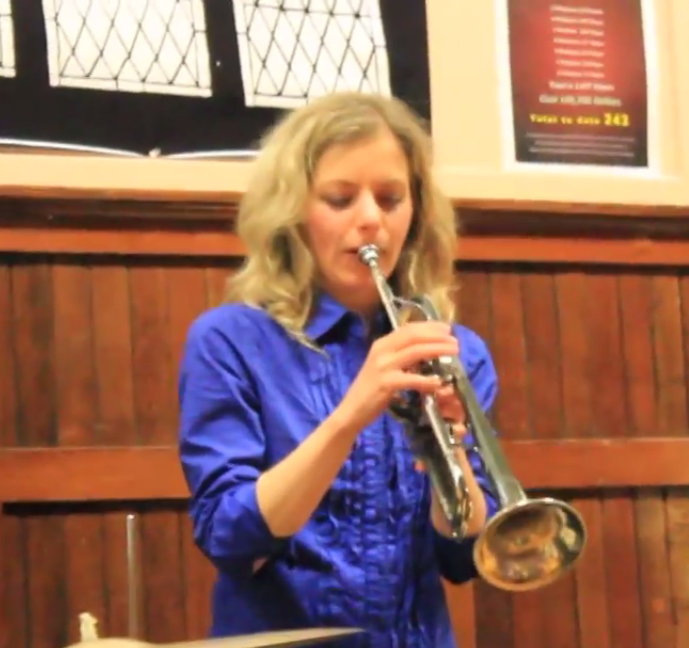

Background information
- Born: October 20, 1973 (age 52); Edmonton, Alberta, Canada
- Genres: Jazz, free improvisation
- Occupation: Musician
- Instrument: Trumpet
- Website: linaallemano.com

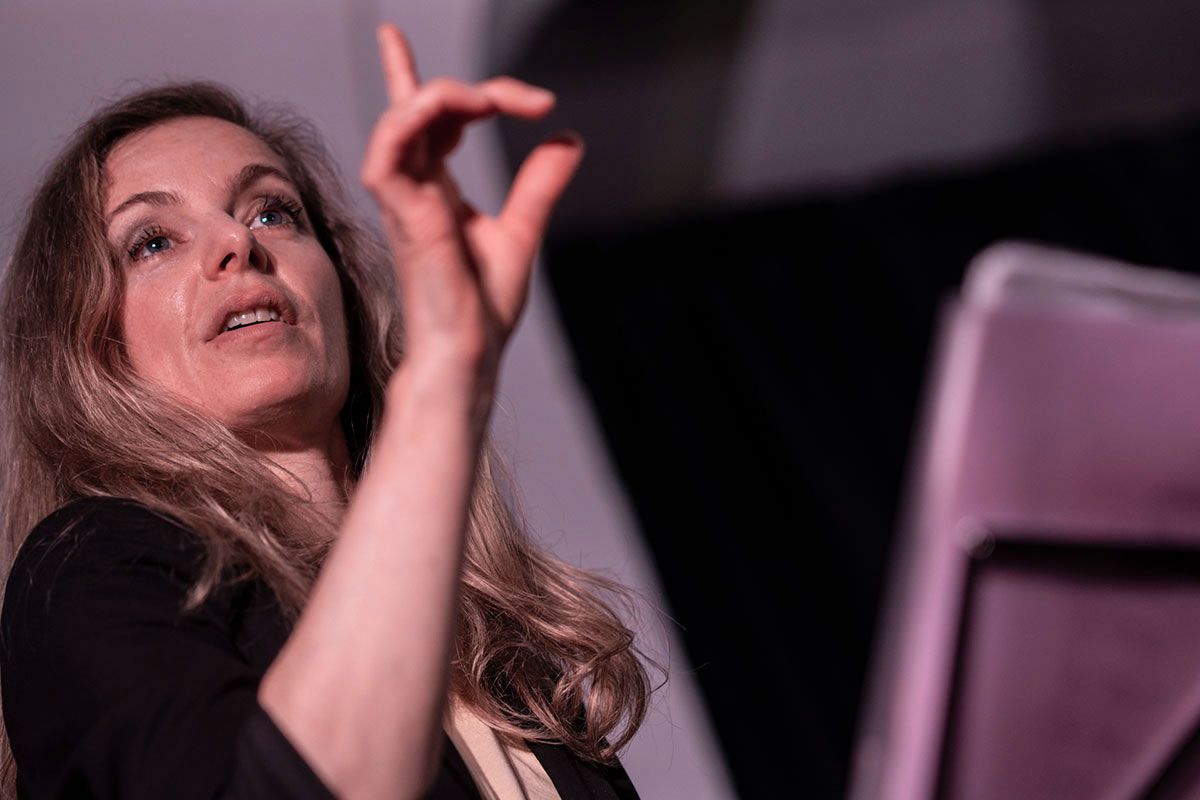
Lina Allemano in Denmark 2022 Photo Hreinn Gudlaugsson

Lina Allemano (born October 20, 1973) is a Canadian musician in the genre of jazz and free improvisation.

== Life and career ==
Allemano grew up in Edmonton, Alberta. Her mother was a literature scholar and writer, and her father is a musician and French teacher.

At ten years old, she began to play her brother's old trumpet. Her father familiarized her with jazz, and at the age of 12, she began to take classical lessons. Her first club concert was at the age of 15. For her education, she moved from Edmonton to Toronto in 1993, where she now resides.

She began performing with Howard Johnson, Don Byron, Dave Holland, Mike Murley, and Joe Lovano. She was invited to the Festival of New Trumpet Music in New York City by Dave Douglas, where she appeared on the scene with Ingrid Jensen and drew the attention of Down Beat. In 2012, she toured Europe with the group, and in 2014, she appeared in Europe with Achim Kaufmann and Christian Weber.

Allemano's quartet Lina Allemano Four performs free jazz and has released six albums.

She composes pieces described as both "[complex] and [having a sense of] anarchic freedom." She also leads the improvisation ensemble Titanium Riot with members including Ryan Driver (analog synthesizer), Rob Clutton (bass guitar), and Nick Fraser (percussion). She has performed with the Paul Read Orchestra, Tim Posgate Horn Band, Cluttertones, the Jane Fair/Rosemary Galloway quintet, the Neufeld-Occhipienti Jazz Orchestra, and has performed as a sidewoman for groups with Marianne Trudel, Achilla Orru, Rob Clutton, Victor Bateman and Tania Gill. Additionally, she has appeared on more than 40 albums.

She currently splits her time between Berlin and Toronto.

== Partial discography ==
Leader or Co-Leader

- Lina Allemano Four, The Diptychs, Lumo Records, 2025
- Lina Allemano's Ohrenschmaus, Flip Side, Lumo Records, 2024
- Lina Allemano / Uwe Oberg / Matthias Bauer / Rudi Fischerlehner, Sog, Creative Sources, 2023
- Lina Allemano / Axel Dörner, Aphelia, Relative Pitch Records, 2023
- Lina Allemano Four, Pipe Dream, Lumo Records, 2023
- Canons, Lumo Records, 2023
- Lina Allemano/Nick Fraser, Trumpet & Drums REMIX Festival, Lumo Records, 2021
- Lina Allemano Four, Vegetables, Lumo Records, 2021
- Bloop, Proof, Lumo Records, 2021
- Glimmer Glammer, Lumo Records, 2020
- Lina Allemano's Ohrenschmaus, Rats and Mice, Lumo Records, 2020
- Nick Fraser / Kris Davis / Tony Malaby, Zoning, Astral Spirits, 2019
- Dikeman/Allemano/Svirsky/Baggiani, The 2nd Path to NowHere, Flea Boy Records (Amsterdam) 2018
- Lina Allemano's Titanium Riot, Squish It!, Lumo Records 2017 [Produced by Lina Allemano]
- Lina Allemano Four, Sometimes Y, Lumo Records 2017 [Produced by Lina Allemano]
- Glamour Nails (Justin Haynes/Lina Allemano), Glamour Nails, Bandcamp 2016
- Lina Allemano's Titanium Riot, Kiss The Brain, Lumo Records 2014 [Produced by Lina Allemano]
- Lina Allemano Four, Live at the Tranzac, Lumo Records 2012 [Produced by Lina Allemano]
- Lina Allemano Four, Jargon, Lumo Records 2010 [Produced by Lina Allemano]
- Lina Allemano Four, Gridjam, Lumo Records 2008 [Produced by Lina Allemano]
- Lina Allemano Four, Pinkeye, Lumo Records 2006 [Produced by Lina Allemano]
- Lina Allemano Four, Concentric, Lumo Records 2003 [Produced by Lina Allemano]
- William Carn / Lina Allemano, Old Souls, Carn-Allemano Productions 1998

Sideperson

- Harry Vetro's Northern Ranger, Northern Ranger, 2018
- The Cluttertones, Leeways 2018
- Satoko Fujii Orchestra Berlin, Ninety-Nine Years, Libra Records 2018
- The Cluttertones, Ordinary Joy, Healing Power Records 2015
- Marianne Trudel Septet, Espoir et Autres Pouvoirs, Effendi Records 2011
- Tania Gill, Bolger Station, Barnyard Records 2010
- Paul Read Orchestra, Arc-En-Ciel, Addo Records 2010
- Tim Posgate Horn Band Featuring Howard Johnson, Banjo Hockey, Black Hen 2009
- Tim Posgate Horn Band Featuring Howard Johnson, Guildwood Records 2005
- Tim Posgate, In the Future of Your Dream, Guildwood Records 2004
- Tim Posgate, Jazzstory, Guildwood Records 2002
- NOJO, Explores the Dark Side of the Moon, True North Records 2010
- NOJO, Highwire, True North Records 2002
- NOJO, You Are Here, True North Records 1998
- Jane Fair/Rosemary Galloway Quintet, Playin' Jane, Independent 2010
- Jane Fair/Rosemary Galloway Quintet, Waltz Out, Independent 2002
- Achilla Orru, Dho-Mach (Sacred Gift), Independent 2004
- Achilla Orru, Te-Kwarro, Independent 2001
- Rob Clutton, Holstein Dream Pageant, Snail Bong Bong Records 2002
- Rob Clutton, Tender Buttons, Snail Bong Bong Records 2000
- Sloan, Navy Blues, Universal/Murderecords 1998
- Royal Wood, A Good Enough Day, DDR/Outside Music 2007
- Victor Bateman, Jazz Guy, 1999
- Lorie Wolf, Taibele and her Demon, 2008
