= Luzia von Wyl =

Swiss pianist and composer (born 1985)

- Born: 1985 (age 40–41); Lucerne, Canton of Lucerne, Switzerland
- Genres: jazz
- Occupations: composer, pianist, music teacher
- Years active: 2011–present
- Labels: Hat Hut Records
- Member of: Luzia von Wyl Ensemble
- Website: luziavonwyl.com

Luzia von Wyl (born 1985) is a Swiss jazz pianist, composer, and music educator. She first studied classical piano before switching to jazz piano and music composition, earning degrees from University of the Arts Bern, Zurich University of the Arts, the Lucerne School of Music, and the University of Zurich. Von Wyl is the composer, pianist, and director of the Luzia von Wyl Ensemble, a jazz band signed with Hat Hut Records.

== Biography ==
Von Wyl was born in Lucerne in 1985. She obtained her matura in 2004. She studied jazz music composition and piano at the University of the Arts Bern, Zurich University of the Arts, and at the Lucerne School of Music, graduating in 2011 with a Master of Arts in piano and a Master of Arts in composition. She trained under Dieter Ammann, Florian Hölscher, and Kaspar Ewald. While a student in Bern, she was the only woman in her composition class. Von Wyl completed an executive master in arts administration at the University of Zurich in 2014.

She founded a ten-piece jazz band, the Luzia von Wyl Ensemble, which performs her compositions. Von Wyl has also written commissioned works for other musicians and bands, including the Melanoia Quartet, Quatuor IXI, the Chamber Soloists Luzern, Karolina Öhman, and Marita Kohler. She has premiered her work in Lucerne, Bern, Zürich, Stans, Berlin, Vienna, Budapest, Prague, Luxembourg, London, New York, and Dubai. Von Wyl has performed at the Lucerne Festival, the Schaffhausen Jazz Festival, the BeJazz Winter Festival, the Bern Jazz Workshop, Swiss Days Dubai, Reset Festival Luxembourg, and the London New Wind Festival. In 2011 she was a winner of the international composition competition of the Orchestra of Our Time New York and in 2017 the winner of a composition competition hosted by the Chicago Ensemble.

Von Wyl and her jazz ensemble are signed with Hat Hut Records. Her debut album, Frost, was released in 2014. She released a second album, Throwing Coins, in 2018.

She worked as a piano teacher at the Musegg Cantonal School in Lucerne and, in 2013, was promoted to be the head of the instrumental department.
