= Dominik Burkhalter =

Swiss bandleader, composer and drummer

Dominik Burkhalter (born 1975 in Zurich) is a Swiss bandleader, composer and drummer.

== Life ==
He started playing the drums in 1982, and began his studies at the Jazz School Lucerne in 1995, where he majored in drums in 1999.

Dominik Burkhalter founded the bands Dom and Asphalt Jungle. He currently lives in Zurich and teaches drums and rhythm at the Jazz Department of the Lucerne College of Music.

== Discography (selected) ==
- Burkhalter Suhner Gisler "Bus Trip" 2005
- Asphalt Jungle "Last one shuts the door" 2005
- Manufacture "Rong Dob" 2005
- Chris Wiesendanger Nonett "undersong" 2005
- Dom "Dissolved" 2005
- Adrian Frey Septet "Seven Songs" 2004
- Reto Suhner Quartet "Montag" 2003
- Asphalt Jungle "Sick of Industry-Driven Music" 2003
- Moe "Reflections" 2003
- Dom "Twilight" 2002
- Reto Suhner Quartet "Born in Herisau" 2001
- Manufacture "#2" 2001
- Adrian Frey Septet "The Sign" 2000
