= Dieter Ammann =

Swiss composer

- Born: 17 May 1962 (age 64); Aarau
- Education: Music Academy of the City of Basel; Academy for Music Education and Church Music
- Occupation: Composer

Dieter Ammann (born 17 May 1962 in Aarau) is a Swiss composer who plays bass guitar, trumpet, cornet, and keyboard.

== Biography ==
He studied at the Academy for Music Education and Church Music in Lucerne and spent several semesters at the Swiss Jazz School in Bern. He has worked in improvised music. As a trumpet player, keyboardist and electric bassist he has played in the free funk band Donkey Kong's Multiscream since the early 1980s and as sideman with Marco Käppeli and other groups such as the international festivals in Cologne, Willisau, Antwerp, and Lugano.

Recordings and studio sessions brought him together with a diverse set of artists such as Eddie Harris, Peter Brötzmann, and Udo Lindenberg.

He studied theory and composition at the Music Academy of the City of Basel and took master classes with Wolfgang Rihm and Witold Lutosławski.

In the 1990s, Ammann's focus shifted to composition. He has received numerous national and international awards for his orchestral and chamber works. He won the Aargauer Kuratorium, the main prize at the International Composition Competition of the IBLA, a foundation based in New York. The Franz Liszt-Scholarship of the Weimar Cultural City of Europe Foundation awarded him first prize for young composers in Europe.

Ammann is currently Professor of Theory and Composition at the Lucerne School of Music.

In December 2010, Ammann and his wife Yolanda were made honorary citizens of the city of Zofingen.

His The Piano Concerto ("Gran Toccata"), a concerto for piano and orchestra, premiered at the London Proms in August 2019.

== Awards ==
- 1995: First prize winner for Switzerland in the competition "Young composers in Europe", Leipzig (study visit, combined with presentation concerts in the Gewandhaus)
- 1996: Grand Prize in the "International Competition for Composers" (in honor of Luciano Berio) of the IBLA Foundation New York
- 1997: First prize in the international composition competition "Symposium NRW for New Music" within the festival "Niederrheinischer Herbst"
- 1997: Winner of the Franz Liszt Fellowship of the Liszt School of Music Franz Liszt Weimar and the Weimar 1999 Kulturstadt Europa GmbH (6-month composition stay with concerts)
- 1999: Second Level Award at the "International Competition for Composers" of the IBLA Foundation New York
- 2003: Composer-in-residence at the 18th International Music Festival Davos (CH)
- 2008: Ernst von Siemens Composer Prize
- 2009: Composer-in-residence at the Festival les Muséiques Basel
- 2010: Composer-in-residence at the Lucerne Festival

== Selected works ==
- Imagination against numbers, for cello (1994, rev. 1998)
- Regard Sur Les Traditions, avec quelques trompes d'oreille, for piano 4 hands (1995)
- The Freedom Of Speech, for Flute, Clarinet, Violin, Violoncello, Piano and Percussion (1995/96)
- Hearing Form – Hommages I – II – III, for Violin, Viola and Violoncello (1998)
- Violation, for violoncello and ensemble (1998/99, for Yolanda)
- Boost, for orchestra (2000/01)
- Core, for orchestra (2002)
- A (tenir) tension, trio for flute and percussion duo (2002)
- Geborstener Satz, string quartet (2003)
- Aprés Le Silence, for Violin, Violoncello and Piano (2004/05)
- Presto Sostinato, for a large ensemble (2006) set, for 14 strings (2007/08)
- String Quartet No.2 (Distance Quartet), for 2 Violins, Viola and Violoncello (2009)
- TURN, for orchestra (2010)
- CUTE, for flute and clarinet (2011)
- Unbalanced instability, Concerto set for violin and chamber orchestra (2012–2013)
- Le réseau des reprises, for a large ensemble (2013–2014), premiered on 2 October 2014 in Strasbourg
- The Piano Concerto (Gran Toccata) (2016–19), premiered on 19 August 2019 in London
- The Viola Concerto (No Templates) ((2020–21 / 2023–24), premiered on 22 January 2025 in Basel
