= Co Streiff =

Swiss jazz musician (born 1959)

- Born: 1959 (age 66–67); Zurich, Switzerland
- Occupations: saxophonist, flutist
- Style: Jazz
- Website: costreiff.ch

Co Streiff (Cornelia Streiff) (5 April 1959 in Zurich) is a Swiss jazz musician who combines the elements of free jazz with the music of Africa. She is a saxophonist and flutist.

She was educated at a conservatory with the transverse flute as her main instrument and also at Jazz School St. Gallen with a saxophone. Since 1983, she has lived as a freelance artist. Her first bands and projects were Kadesh and Tobende Ordnung (Raging Order). In 1986, she began her collaboration with Irène Schweizer. She appeared in the Canaille Festivals mostly with Lindsay Cooper and Joëlle Léandre. She took part in different projects of the Vienna Art Orchestra from 1988 until 1995. They make several long workshop tours in non-European countries (Egypt, Nigeria, Zimbabwe, Benin, Ghana, Kuwait, Kyrgyzstan). She has had an intensive collaboration with Kadash & The Nile Troup. Tommy Meier, Russ Johnson, Christian Weber and Fredi Flückiger belong to her sextet. She has performed with Hilaria Kramer, Béatrice Graf and Karoline Höfler in the quartet Ratruba. With Gabriela Friedli, she has led the quartet Objets Trouvés. This quartet published three albums until 2013.

== Discography ==
- Canaille '91
- Co Streiff Sextett: Qattara (Intakt Records, 2002)
- Co Streiff – Irène Schweizer: Twin Lines (Intakt Records 2002)
- Friedli-Streiff-Schlegel-Ulrich: Objets Trouvés. Fragile (Intakt Records 2005)
- Co Streiff Sextet: Loops, Holes & Angels (Inakt Records 2007)
- Co Streiff – Russ Johnson Quartet In Circles (Inakt Records 2011)
