= Jürg Solothurnmann =

Jürg Solothurnmann (born 22 April 1943) is a Swiss jazz saxophonist, musicologist, journalist, radio producer and concert organizer. He has been active in the Swiss and European jazz scenes since the 1960s and has been particularly associated with contemporary jazz, free jazz, free improvisation, and combinations of jazz with Swiss traditional music.

== Early life and education ==
Solothurnmann was born on 22 April 1943 in Zuchwil, Switzerland, and grew up in the city of Solothurn. During his childhood and youth he learned several instruments, including accordion, piano, banjo and marching drums, before concentrating on the saxophone. He studied history, musicology and ethnomusicology at the University of Bern and later studied at Indiana University Bloomington. At the Swiss Jazz School in Bern he studied saxophone and jazz theory. Among his teachers and important academic influences were composer Sándor Veress, jazz educator David N. Baker and ethnomusicologist George List.

== Music and journalism ==
Solothurnmann began working as a music journalist while still a student. In 1969 he began contributing to Swiss Radio DRS and later became a music editor there. He remained associated with Swiss public radio until 2008, producing approximately 2,000 programmes dealing with jazz, contemporary music and traditional music. As a musician, Solothurnmann initially worked in post-bop, blues, jazz-rock and Afro-Latin settings before moving increasingly toward free jazz and free improvisation. His work has frequently combined contemporary jazz with elements of Swiss folk music and other musical traditions. In the 1970s he led the quartet Upsilon, which was associated with the New Jazz movement. From the early 1980s he became particularly associated with the Alpine Jazz Herd, which he co-led with trumpeter Hans Kennel. The ensemble developed a style combining contemporary jazz with elements of Swiss traditional music. The Alpine Jazz Herd performed at major Swiss jazz events, including the Jazz Festival Willisau. A 1986 festival programme described Solothurnmann and Kennel as the ensemble's musical directors and noted Solothurnmann's influential position in several areas of the Swiss jazz scene, including his work for Swiss Radio DRS. The Alpine Jazz Herd recorded, among other works, Swiss Flavor in 1983 and Alpine Two in 1992. Solothurnmann played tenor, alto and soprano saxophones on the recordings.

== Improvisation and international collaborations ==
From the 1980s onward, Solothurnmann participated in numerous projects involving musicians from Switzerland, Europe, the United States and other regions. His collaborators have included John Tchicai, Alex Schlippenbach, Günter Baby Sommer, Vinko Globokar, Pauline Oliveros, Evan Parker, Tony Scott and Dieter Glawischnig. He also developed interdisciplinary projects involving poets, dancers, p ainters, actors and performance artists. One of his projects involved setting poetry by American poet E. E. Cummings to music, in collaboration with musicians including Ellen Christi. Solothurnmann's interest in musicology and jazz criticism was reflected in his scholarly writing. In 1977 he published the essay "Zur Ästhetik der afro-amerikanischen Musik (Timbre – Geräusch – Emotion)" in Jazzforschung / Jazz Research, the journal of the International Society for Jazz Research.

== Unit Records ==
In 1983 Solothurnmann was one of the founders of the Swiss jazz record label Unit Records, together with Hans Kennel, Paul Haag and Urs Blöchlinger. The label was established as a platform for innovative musicians from the German-speaking part of Switzerland and initially released recordings by projects associated with its founders, including the Alpine Jazz Herd and Upsilon. Solothurnmann was involved in the management of Unit Records from its foundation until 1991. The label subsequently became an important outlet for Swiss jazz and improvised music and continued operating for decades after its founding.

== Later work ==
During the 1990s and 2000s Solothurnmann continued to lead and participate in a variety of ensembles and interdisciplinary projects, including the Agasul Orchester, First Aid Band, Sound & Space and other groups. He also continued working as a performer, educator, writer and organizer of musical events. His later projects included the ensemble In Transit, whose album Shifting Moods was released by Konnex Records in 2011. His work has continued to move between composed jazz, free improvisation, experimental music and musical traditions from different cultures. Solothurnmann has received cultural and broadcasting-related awards for his work as a musician, journalist and promoter of jazz. His activities have encompassed performance, radio production, music education, scholarship, concert organization and the development of institutions supporting Swiss musicians.
