= Erika Stucky =

Swiss musician

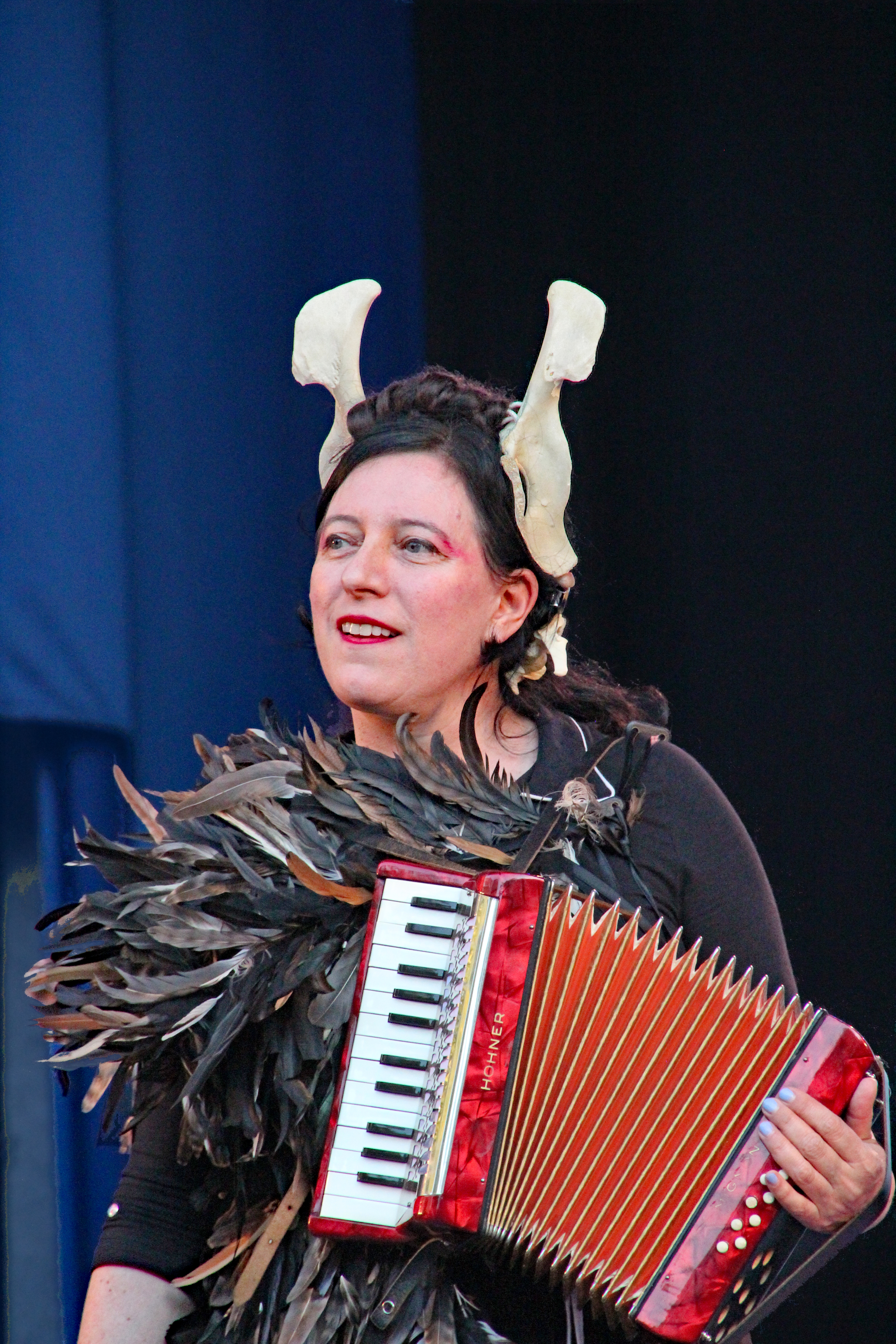
Erika Stucky (2016)

Erika Stucky (born 1962 in San Francisco) is a Swiss musician, singer, composer, and accordionist, best known for her solo albums Jimi (2005), Princess (2005), Suicidal Yodels (2007), Black Widow (2013), Call Me Helium (2015), and Papito (2017).

== Biography ==
In 1907 her grandfather Theodor Stucky, decided to leave the Upper Valais, boarding a transatlantic ship to become a lumberjack in Canada; he later settled in California. Since then, the Stucky family, from generation to generation, has divided their life between California and the Swiss mountains. Erika's father, Bruno Stucky, was a butcher's caterer for The Palace Hotel in San Francisco. He was a passionate fan of American music, in particular Connie Francis and the Rat Pack. In the winter of 1971, for economic reasons as much as for nostalgia for the Alps, the whole family returned to Europe, finally settling in the village of Mörel. Erika Stucky takes part in folk groups in traditional costume, where she spins the coin, swings the broom (which she later abandons for a shovel and yodels. At the age of 17, she performed in the musical Hair, playing all the female roles. With a friend, she traveled for eight months in South America, singing in the streets, in traditional costume, a mixture of American folk repertoire and rudimentary yodelling.

== Artistic career ==
After being expelled from Dimitri's mime school in Ticino, she moved to Paris for two years. There she studied jazz singing with Jean-Claude Briodin and drama at the Atelier Serge Martin. She obtained an acting diploma. In 1985, she co-founded the a-capella group (with double bass) The Sophisticrats, which gave over 500 concerts in Europe and Africa, winning several awards; also making their first Super8 films for the live concerts. In 1991, together with Marco Raoult, she founded the Band Bubble-Town, whose genre she defines as a fantasy folklore, a blend of universal traditions forming an imaginary culture. In 1994, she appeared as soloist with the George Gruntz Concert Jazz Band, touring Switzerland, Germany and Russia; Elvin Jones and Joe Henderson joined the tour in Berlin. In 1997, together with two American trombonists (Art Baron and Ray Anderson), she formed the trio Mrs Bubble & Bones. She began collaborating with trombonists and alphorn players Robert Morgenthaler and Jean-Jacques Pedretti, as well as drummer Lucas Niggli; the group was christened Roots of Communication. In 1999, she toured with Cologne's WDR Big Band, sharing the stage with Argentina's bandoneon player Dino Saluzzi and swiss pianist and Big Band leader, George Gruntz. In 2000, Stucky played the role of Mrs. God for several months in Sibylle Berg's play Helges Leben, at the Schauspielhaus in Bochum; her swiss singer friend Sina played the role of Mrs. Death, and together they composed the music for the show, beginning a long-term collaboration entitled Stucky & Sina, marked by the creation and synchronisation of their super8 films projected on stage. In 2002, she opened the Swiss national exhibition Expo.02 in Murten. Stucky was invited by guitarist Christy Doran and drummer Fredy Studer to join the Jimi Hendrix Project (Jamaaladeen Tacuma and Kim Clarke alternated on bass). In 2006, the Young Gods hired her to take part in the Woodstock Project. The same year, she took over the role held by Linda Ronstadt in the opera Escalator Over The Hill, composed by Carla Bley, libretto by Paul Haines; Carla Bley herself played the piano at the Essen Philharmonic live concert. In 2007, she was one of three protagonists in Stefan Schwietert's documentary Heimatklänge, which follows three singers (Noldi Alder and Christian Zehnder) and questions their relationship with Swiss tradition. In 2010, she premiered George Gruntz's opera Milk & Honey at Basel's Stadttheater, with a ballet choreographed by Richard Wherlock. In the same year, she gave concerts with the Stucky & Roots project at the Swiss Pavilion at the Shanghai World Expo; Stuckys performance in front of Swiss politicians and her contemporary vision of tradition caused a scandal in Switzerland. In 2011, with her producer Knut Jensen, she founded the Ping Pong Project, where ukulele, mini-accordion, laptop and voice meet; broadcasting live on stage her films shot in Shanghai. In the same year, she took part in Raindogs Revisited, a tribute to Tom Waits directed by David Coulter of The Pogues, featuring Arthur H, Jane Birkin, Steve Nieve, The Tiger Lillies, Camille O'Sullivan and St Vincent. In 2012, between Stockholm and London, she recorded the album Black Widow", featuring Tom Waits' historic collaborator Michael Blair and Terry Edwards. In 2014, Stucky created the show Wally und die Sieben Geier with the Austrian orchestra Da Blechhauf'n, playing a mythical character who lives in the Alps among seven vultures. In 2018, she recorded an album with a baroque octet (La Cetra), featuring former member of the German group Einstürzende Neubauten, F.M. Einheit, and also countertenor Andreas Scholl. Including a cover of Lucio Dalla's Italian song Caruso. In 2024 she is touring with her new Program Ice Orkestra. For the first time she worked with the musicians Julien Annoni and Serge Vuille.

== Distinction PRIX ==
Stucky received the Swiss Kleinkunst Prize for Bubble Town in 1996. In 1998/99, she was awarded a work year stipend by the City of Zurich. In 2010, she received the Valais Culture Prize, in 2014 she was nominated for the Swiss Music Prize and in 2017 the Recognition Prize of the Canton of Zurich for the album Papito. In 2020, she was awarded the Grand Prix Music from the Swiss Federal Office of Culture. In July 2020, the Swiss Federal Department of Culture awarded him the Grand Prix Suisse de Musique 2023. In 2026 she received the Art Award of the City of Zurich.

== Discography ==
- We Love You, The Sophisticrats FunKey, 1990
- Bubbles & Bones, Traumton Records, 2001
- Lovebites, Traumton Records, 2003
- Jimi (Doran, Stucky, Studer, Clarke), Double Moon Records, 2005
- Princess, Traumton Records, 2005
- Suicidal Yodels, Traumton Records, 2007
- Stucky Live 1985-2010, Traumton Records, 2011
- Black Widow, Traumton Records, 2013
- Papito, Traumton Records, 2017
