= Vich, Switzerland =

Vich
- Municipality
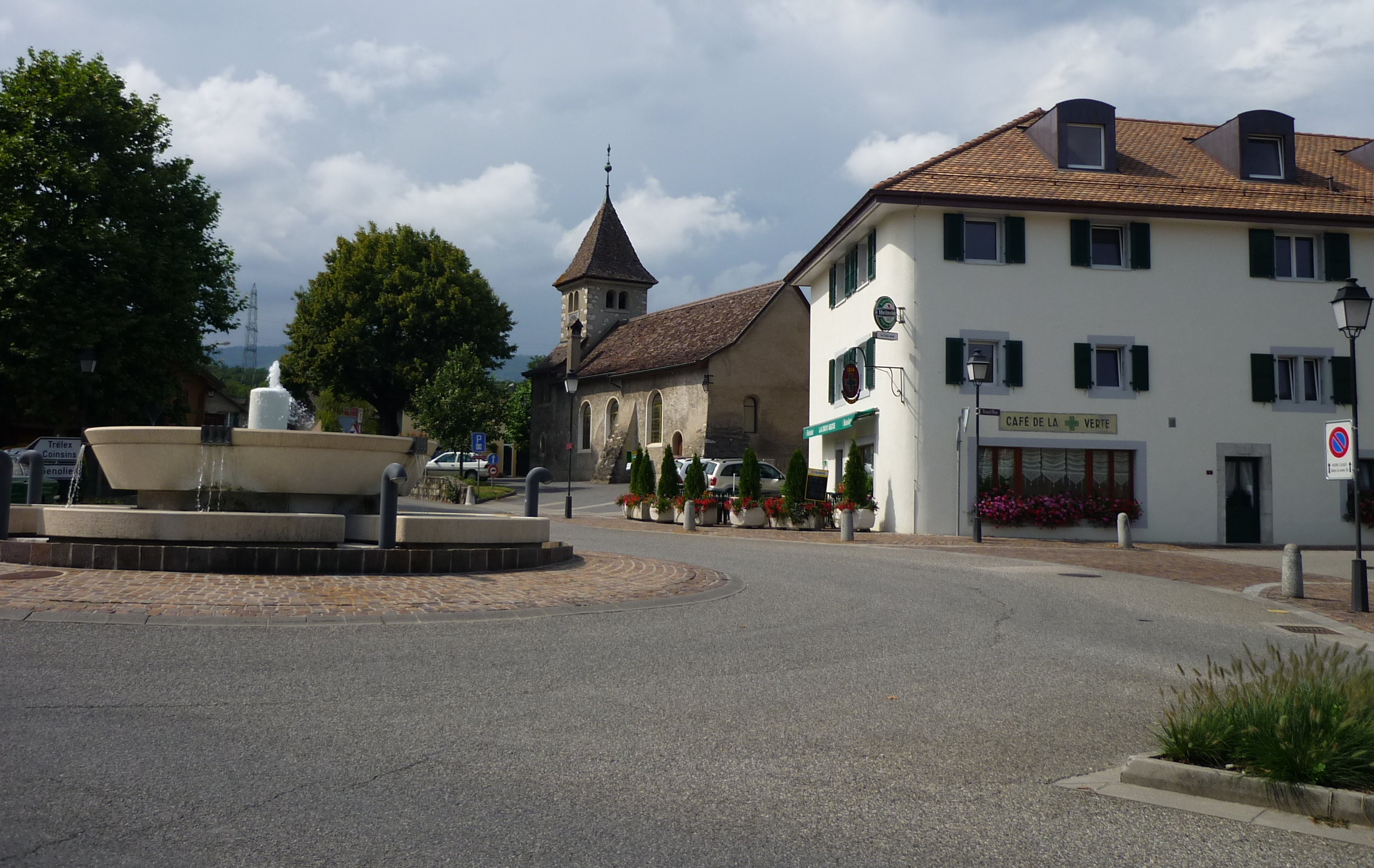
- The center of Vich and its church

- Flag Coat of arms
- Location of Vich
- Location within Switzerland Location within Canton of Vaud
- Coordinates: 46°26′N 6°15′E
- Country: Switzerland
- Canton: Vaud
- District: Nyon

Government
  - Mayor: Syndic; Antonella Salamin

Area
  - Total: 1.56 km^{2} (0.60 sq mi)
- Elevation: 456 m (1,496 ft)

Population (2008)
  - Total: 713
  - Density: 457/km^{2} (1,180/sq mi)
- Time zone: UTC+01:00 (CET)
  - Summer (DST): UTC+02:00 (CEST)
- Postal code: 1267
- SFOS number: 5732
- ISO 3166 code: CH-VD
- Surrounded by: Arzier, Bassins, Begnins, Coinsins, Genolier, Gland, Prangins
- Website: www.vich.ch

Vich is a municipality in the district of Nyon in the canton of Vaud in Switzerland.

== History ==
Vich is known to have been a Paleolithic settlement, only to have been abandoned in the Neolithic, although the area was certainly exploited by people from the settlement of nearby Gland. Although traces from the Bronze Age have been found in the vicinity, and the site that was to become Vich found itself strategically situated on the Vy de l'Etraz - the Roman paved road (albeit with prehistoric antecedents) from Nyon to Orbe - there is no archaeological evidence or mention of a village until 1165 when the church of Vich (ecclesiam de Vizo) was given by the Lord of Begnins to the Cistercian abbey of Bonmont. The lordship of Vich changed hands several times during the following centuries, from Besançon to Cossonay, Prangins and Savoy, and from 1218 onwards, Vich, and some of its inhabitants, are well-documented.

In 1536 the Pays de Vaud was taken by the Bernese who remained masters until 1798 when the canton was liberated by the French revolutionary troops; and in 1803 Vich found itself part of the Swiss Confederation.

== Geography ==
Vich has an area, as of 2009, of 1.6 square kilometers (0.62 mi^{2}). Of this area, 0.64 km^{2} (0.25 mi^{2}) or 41.0% is used for agricultural purposes, while 0.48 km^{2} (0.19 mi^{2}) or 30.8% is forested. Of the rest of the land, 0.44 km^{2} (0.17 mi^{2}) or 28.2% is settled (buildings or roads).

Of the built up area, industrial buildings made up 3.8% of the total area while housing and buildings made up 16.0% and transportation infrastructure made up 5.8%. Power and water infrastructure as well as other special developed areas made up 1.3% of the area while parks, green belts and sports fields made up 1.3%. Out of the forested land, 23.1% of the total land area is heavily forested and 7.7% is covered with orchards or small clusters of trees. Of the agricultural land, 18.6% is used for growing crops and 5.8% is pastures, while 16.7% is used for orchards or vine crops.

The municipality was part of the Nyon District until it was dissolved on 31 August 2006, and Vich became part of the new district of Nyon.

== Coat of arms ==
The blazon of the municipal coat of arms is Gules, a Garb Or between two Grapes of the same.

== Demographics ==
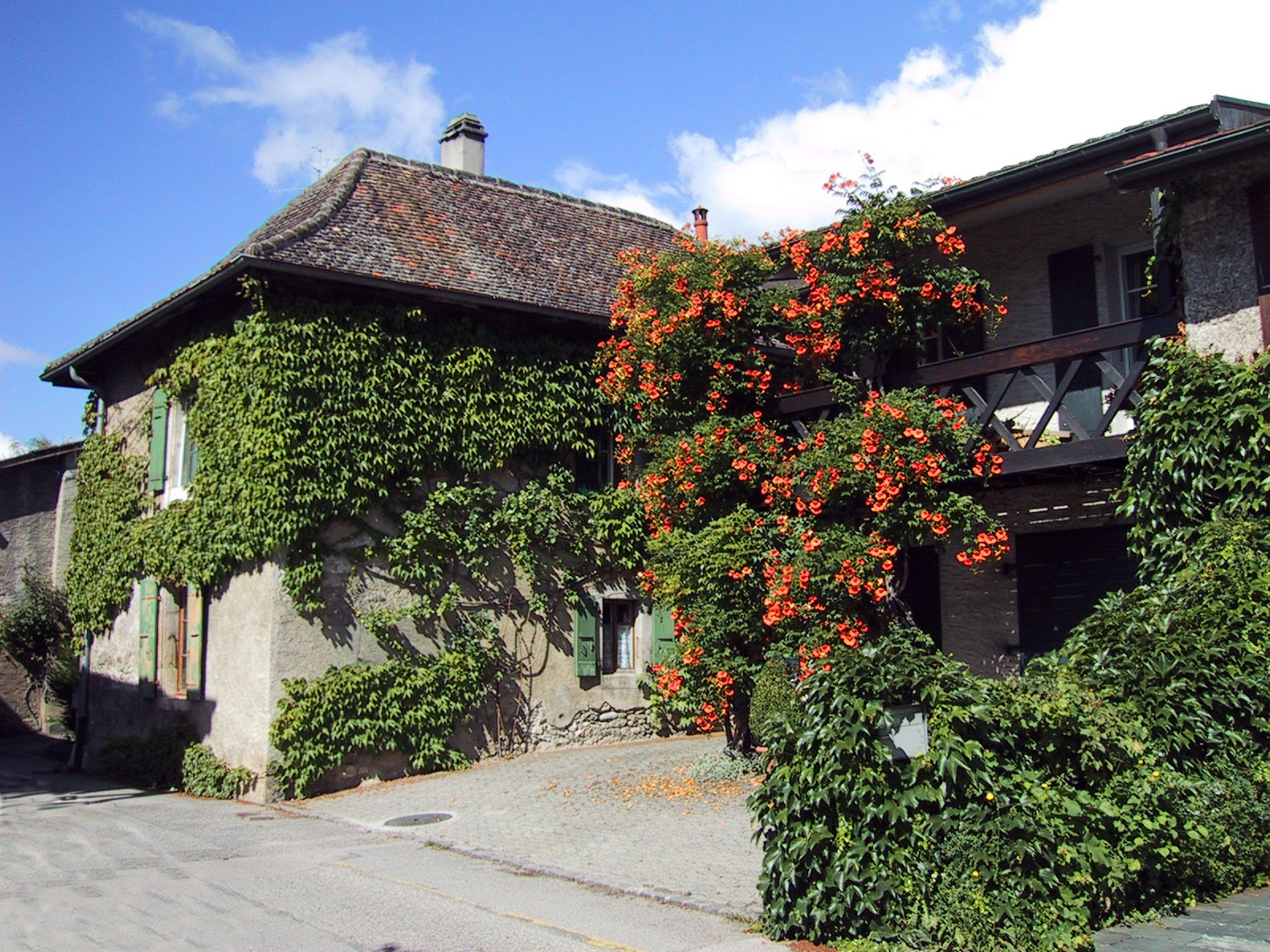
A winegrower's house in Vich

Vich has a population (as of December 2020) of 1,155. As of 2008, 26.1% of the population are resident foreign nationals. Over the last 10 years (1999–2009 ) the population has changed at a rate of 4.6%. It has changed at a rate of -3.6% due to migration and at a rate of 8.5% due to births and deaths.

Most of the population (as of 2000) speaks French (574 or 78.2%), with English being second most common (60 or 8.2%) and German being third (43 or 5.9%). There are 13 people who speak Italian.

The age distribution, as of 2009, in Vich is; 78 children or 10.7% of the population are between 0 and 9 years old and 93 teenagers or 12.8% are between 10 and 19. Of the adult population, 85 people or 11.7% of the population are between 20 and 29 years old. 92 people or 12.7% are between 30 and 39, 140 people or 19.3% are between 40 and 49, and 119 people or 16.4% are between 50 and 59. The senior population distribution is 88 people or 12.1% of the population are between 60 and 69 years old, 16 people or 2.2% are between 70 and 79, there are 13 people or 1.8% who are between 80 and 89, and there are 2 people or 0.3% who are 90 and older.

As of 2000, there were 327 people who were single and never married in the municipality. There were 358 married individuals, 20 widows or widowers and 29 individuals who are divorced.

As of 2000, there were 277 private households in the municipality, and an average of 2.6 persons per household. There were 78 households that consist of only one person and 24 households with five or more people. Out of a total of 284 households that answered this question, 27.5% were households made up of just one person. Of the rest of the households, there are 62 married couples without children, 114 married couples with children There were 19 single parents with a child or children. There were 4 households that were made up of unrelated people and 7 households that were made up of some sort of institution or another collective housing.

In 2000 there were 135 single family homes (or 72.2% of the total) out of a total of 187 inhabited buildings. There were 25 multi-family buildings (13.4%), along with 15 multi-purpose buildings that were mostly used for housing (8.0%) and 12 other use buildings (commercial or industrial) that also had some housing (6.4%).

In 2000, a total of 263 apartments (82.4% of the total) were permanently occupied, while 47 apartments (14.7%) were seasonally occupied and 9 apartments (2.8%) were empty. As of 2009, the construction rate of new housing units was 2.7 new units per 1000 residents. The vacancy rate for the municipality, in 2010, was 0.91%.

The historical population is given in the following chart:

== Politics ==
In the 2007 federal election the most popular party was the SVP which received 21.88% of the vote. The next three most popular parties were the SP (20.12%), the LPS Party (15.79%) and the Green Party (12.79%). In the federal election, a total of 198 votes were cast, and the voter turnout was 47.7%.

== Economy ==
The Plainisphare record label is based in Vich.

As of 2010, Vich had an unemployment rate of 4.4%. As of 2008, there were 25 people employed in the primary economic sector and about 5 businesses involved in this sector. 250 people were employed in the secondary sector and there were 10 businesses in this sector. 271 people were employed in the tertiary sector, with 46 businesses in this sector. There were 373 residents of the municipality who were employed in some capacity, of which females made up 44.0% of the workforce.

In 2008 the total number of full-time equivalent jobs was 478. The number of jobs in the primary sector was 13, all of which were in agriculture. The number of jobs in the secondary sector was 241 of which 18 or (7.5%) were in manufacturing and 223 (92.5%) were in construction. The number of jobs in the tertiary sector was 224. In the tertiary sector; 152 or 67.9% were in wholesale or retail sales or the repair of motor vehicles, 5 or 2.2% were in the movement and storage of goods, 9 or 4.0% were in a hotel or restaurant, 4 or 1.8% were in the information industry, 10 or 4.5% were the insurance or financial industry, 13 or 5.8% were technical professionals or scientists, 9 or 4.0% were in education.

In 2000, there were 326 workers who commuted into the municipality and 305 workers who commuted away. The municipality is a net importer of workers, with about 1.1 workers entering the municipality for every one leaving. About 13.5% of the workforce coming into Vich are coming from outside Switzerland, while 0.3% of the locals commute out of Switzerland for work. Of the working population, 13.1% used public transportation to get to work, and 72.7% used a private car.

== Religion ==
From the 2000 census, 245 or 33.4% were Roman Catholic, while 250 or 34.1% belonged to the Swiss Reformed Church. Of the rest of the population, there were 10 members of an Orthodox church (or about 1.36% of the population), and there were 27 individuals (or about 3.68% of the population) who belonged to another Christian church. There were 3 individuals (or about 0.41% of the population) who were Jewish, and 12 (or about 1.63% of the population) who were Islamic. There were 3 individuals who were Buddhist. 148 (or about 20.16% of the population) belonged to no church, are agnostic or atheist, and 45 individuals (or about 6.13% of the population) did not answer the question.

== Education ==
In Vich about 228 or (31.1%) of the population have completed non-mandatory upper secondary education, and 175 or (23.8%) have completed additional higher education (either university or a Fachhochschule). Of the 175 who completed tertiary schooling, 43.4% were Swiss men, 32.6% were Swiss women, 16.0% were non-Swiss men and 8.0% were non-Swiss women.

In the 2009/2010 school year there were a total of 66 students in the Vich school district. In the Vaud cantonal school system, two years of non-obligatory pre-school are provided by the political districts. During the school year, the political district provided pre-school care for a total of 1,249 children of which 563 children (45.1%) received subsidized pre-school care. The canton's primary school program requires students to attend for four years. There were 28 students in the municipal primary school program. The obligatory lower secondary school program lasts for six years and there were 36 students in those schools. There were also 2 students who were home schooled or attended another non-traditional school.

As of 2000, there were 37 students in Vich who came from another municipality, while 109 residents attended schools outside the municipality.

=== Schools ===
Collège de L'Esplanade Begnins, a public school, serves Vich.

La Côte International School was previously in Vich.
