= Werner Lüdi =

- Born: April 22, 1936; Poschiavo, Switzerland
- Died: June 21, 2000 (aged 64); Zürich, Switzerland
- Genres: Jazz, free improvisation
- Occupation: Musician
- Instrument(s): Alto saxophone Bariton saxophone

Werner Lüdi (April 22, 1936 – June 21, 2000) was a Swiss jazz musician (alto- and baritone saxophone) and author.

== Biography ==
Lüdi was born on April 22, 1936 in Poschiavo. He spent the early years of his life in Val Poschiavo and spent his youth in Landquart, where he played accordion in a band. He became familiar with cool jazz and played baritone saxophone in Tone Schädler's band. In 1958, he moved to Hamburg, where he participated in jam sessions. In jam sessions, he got to know Peter Brötzmann, but he could not contact at first with a band of modern jazz.

In 1964, he made a tour as an alto saxophonist with Gunter Hampel's band for one year and then, he went to Munich, where he made jam sessions with Pierre Favre. Then, he came back to Switzerland in 1966 and started to work as a photographer in a public relations office and copywriter in an advertising agency.

In 1981, Lüdi came again to jazz scene and founded the group Sunnymoon with Stephan Wittwer, Fredy Studer and Léon Francioli. In 1984, Hans Koch, Martin Schütz, Timo Fleig and Lüdi played free improvisation in this group. Later, Koch, Schütz, Lüdi and Paul Lovens performed together. At the end of 1980s, he played with Mani Neumeier, Wädi Gysi and the trumpet player Mich Gerber as the group Blauer Hirsch.

He has performed also with Brötzmann's Märzcombo, Butch Morris, Sainkho Namtchylak, Peter Kowald, William Parker, Saadet Türköz, Burhan Öçal, Peter Conradin Zumthor and Daniel Seiler.
