= Hélène Labarrière =

French jazz musician (born 1963)

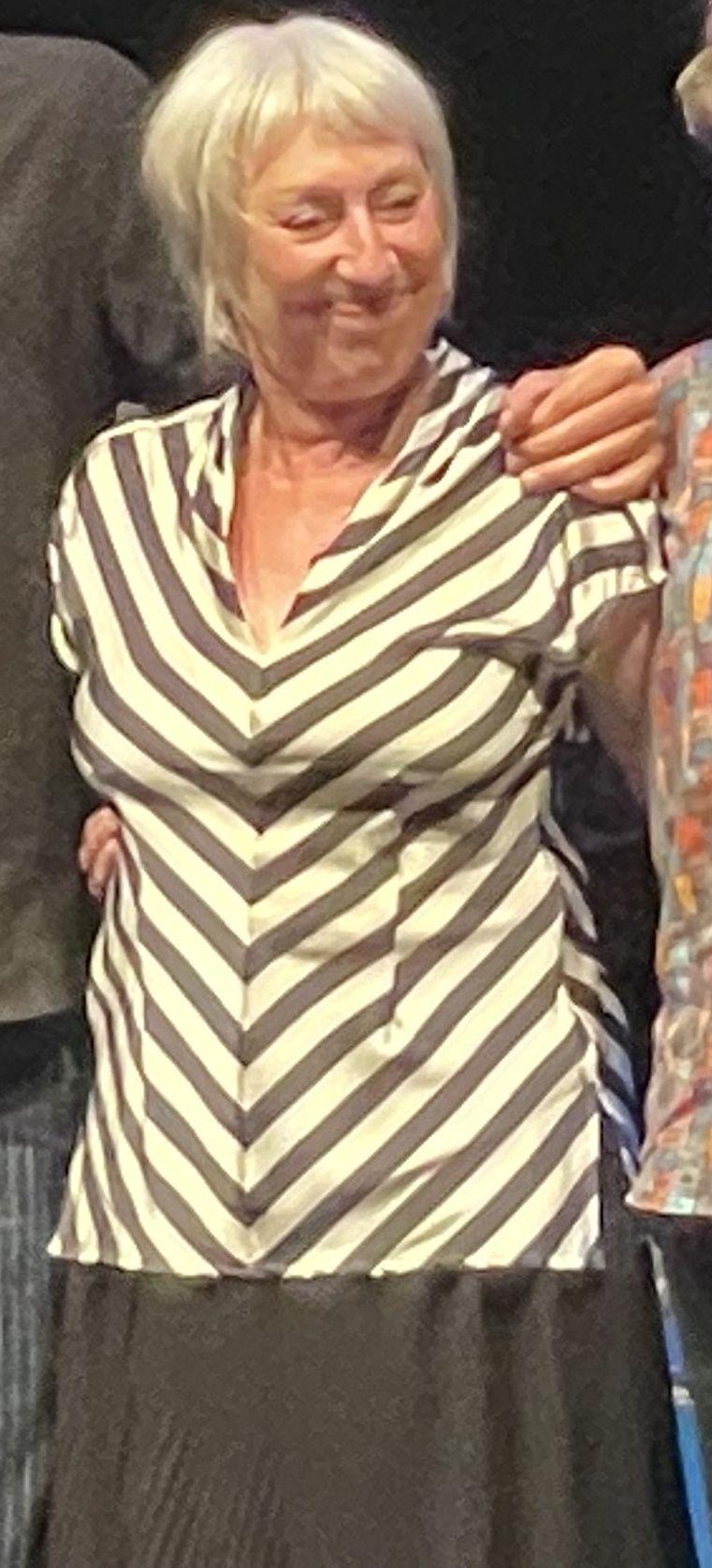
- Born: 23 October 1963 (age 62); Neuilly-sur-Seine, France
- Occupations: double bass, bass guitar
- Style: jazz, improvisation
- Website: helene-labarriere.com

Hélène Labarrière (23 October 1963 in Neuilly-sur-Seine) is a French musician in the fields of jazz and improvisation music (double bass and bass guitar).
