= Tom Götze =

German Jazz bassist

Tom Götze (born 1968, Dresden) is a German bassist and professor at the Hochschule für Musik Carl Maria von Weber in Dresden for double bass and electric bass jazz/rock/pop.

== Life ==
Götze's musical career began in Dresden. From 1984 to 1990, he studied tuba, bass guitar and double bass at the Hochschule für Musik Carl Maria von Weber Dresden. Since 1993, he has been active as a musician in the styles of jazz, rock, pop and classical as well as an actor (among others Staatsschauspiel Dresden).

Since 1989 Götze has been a member of the Dresden band Dekadance, with whom several albums have been produced. He has worked with numerous well-known artists such as Mike Stern, Pet Shop Boys, Armin Mueller-Stahl, Günther Fischer, Till Brönner, Adam Rogers, Manfred Krug, Richie Beirach, John Schröder, Gitte Hænning, Uschi Brüning, Jiggs Whigham, Chester Thompson, Pascal von Wroblewsky, Günther "Baby" Sommer, Rhani Krija, Sven Helbig and Günter Hörig.

As a founding member of the Dresdner Sinfoniker, he is regularly involved in their projects, also as a soloist.

== Professor ==
Since 2012, he has taught been double bass and bass guitar at his own alma mater, the Hochschule für Musik Carl Maria von Weber Dresden.

== Recordings ==
- 2019: The 10string Orchestra Clouds
- 2013: Stephan Bormann, Tom Götze, The Ten String Orchestra: Pearls (Acoustic Music)
- 2013: Lars Kutschke Right Here, Right Now
- 2012: Tom Goetze Band Bass Shuttle

== Awards ==
- 2015 – Golden German Jazz Award for the Album Auserwählt by Manfred Krug and Uschi Brüning
- 2016 – Platin German Jazz Award for the Album Auserwählt.
- 2017 – Golden German Jazz Award für das Album Manfred Krug – Seine Lieder
