= Simon Picard =

British jazz musician

Simon Picard is a British jazz saxophonist associated with the British free jazz and improvised music scenes. He has performed primarily on tenor saxophone and has worked with a number of prominent British and European improvising musicians and ensembles, including the London Jazz Composers' Orchestra, Trevor Watts' Moiré Music, the British Saxophone Quartet, and groups led by Paul Dunmall and Elton Dean.

== Career ==
Picard emerged on the British jazz scene as a member of the jazz-rock and improvisational group Stinky Winkles. The group won the G.L.A.A. Young Jazz Musicians Award in 1979 and subsequently performed regularly at London venues and on radio broadcasts. In a contemporary review published in Jazz Journal, critic Matthew Bateson described Stinky Winkles as an original British jazz-rock fusion group whose music combined jazz, rock, funk, free improvisation and elements of twentieth-century classical music. The review singled out Picard's technique and imagination as a member of the group and identified him as the son of jazz trombonist John Picard. During the 1980s and 1990s, Picard became increasingly involved in British free improvisation. He was a member of Barry Guy's London Jazz Composers' Orchestra and worked with musicians including Trevor Watts, Elton Dean, Keith Tippett, Paul Dunmall and John Stevens. He was also a member of the British Saxophone Quartet alongside Elton Dean, Paul Dunmall and George Haslam. The British Saxophone Quartet's album Early October, recorded in 1995, featured Picard on tenor saxophone. A contemporary Jazz Journal review described the quartet's approach as highly individual and emphasized the equal freedom given to its four saxophonists. Picard's tenor playing was specifically characterized as an important part of the quartet's collective sound. Picard also participated in Elton Dean's Unlimited Saxophone Company, whose personnel included Dean, Paul Dunmall, Trevor Watts, Picard, bassist Paul Rogers and drummer Tony Levin. The ensemble's performances were recorded in London in 1989 and subsequently issued by Ogun Records. In the 1990s and 2000s, Picard continued to collaborate with other leading improvisers. He formed the Utoma Trio with drummer Tony Bianco and saxophonist Paul Dunmall. The trio's work was critically noted in the jazz press; excerpts from reviews collected by Emanem Records describe the project as one of the notable tenor-saxophone trio projects of its period.

== News From the North ==
Picard's best-known release as a leader is News From the North, recorded with ba ssist Paul Rogers and drummer Tony Marsh. The album was issued by Intakt Records and features Picard on tenor saxophone. Its eleven tracks include "Liver Friction", "Nervy", "Nautic", "Volute", "Temporal" and the title track. The album is also listed in AllMusic's discography for Picard, which identifies him as its primary artist, tenor saxophonist and composer.

== London Jazz Composers' Orchestra ==
Picard has been a longstanding member of the London Jazz Composers' Orchestra, led by bassist and composer Barry Guy. He participated in recordings by the ensemble from the early 1990s onward, including Theoria, recorded in Zürich in 1991. Picard remained associated with the orchestra decades later. At its 50th-anniversary performances in Kraków in 2020, critic John Sharpe identified Picard as one of the orchestra's long-standing British members and specifically discussed his tenor-saxophone playing during the performances. Picard also appeared on later recordings of the orchestra. The 2022 release Harmos – Live at Krakow features him on tenor saxophone, and a review by the Free Jazz Collective noted that Picard was one of only a small number of musicians from the orchestra's original British generation who remained members decades after its formation.

== Musical style ==
Picard's playing has been associated primarily with free jazz, free improvisation and other forms of experimental jazz. Reviews have particularly noted his work in collective improvisational settings. In a review of En.tropo.logy, Jazzword described Picard as a clear-toned tenor saxophonist and an integral member of the London Jazz Composers' Orchestra. His playing has also been documented in the work of Trevor Watts' Moiré Music. On the album With One Voice, Picard plays tenor saxophone alongside Watts and an ensemble including Veryan Weston, Colin Gibson, Liam Genockey and Ghanaian percussionists Nana Tsiboe and Kofi Adu.
