= Martin Schütz (theoretical chemist) =

Swiss theoretical chemist and quantum chemist

- Born: 14 November 1963; Burgdorf (BE), Switzerland
- Died: 25 February 2018
- Education: ETH, Zürich; Bern; University of Stuttgart
- Occupations: Theoretical Chemist; Quantum Chemist; University Professor
- Spouse: Beatrice Pfeuti
- Children: 2
- Parent(s): Jakob & Sylvia Schütz

Martin Schütz (14 November 1963 – 25 February 2018) was a Swiss theoretical chemist and quantum chemist.

== Life ==
Martin Schütz was born at Burgdorf (BE) in Middle Switzerland, the son of Jakob and Sylvia Schütz.

His first year of university level education was spent studying Electrical Engineering at Zürich's ETH (Technology Institute) during 1983/84. He then switched to the University of Bern where he studied Physical Chemistry between 1984 and 1989, receiving his first degree on 25 May 1989 in exchange for a dissertation entitled "Laser spectroscopy and Monte Carlo simulations of molecular solvent clusters". He stayed on at Bern undertaking research for his doctorate which he received on 13 May 1993. This time his work was concerned with investigating "vibronic effects in hydrate clusters": the resulting dissertation was entitled "Structures and Vibrations of Hydrate clusters with aromatic Chromophores". Schütz's work was supervised by Prof. Samuel Leutwyler, both in respect of the dissertation with which he completed his first degree course and for his doctorate. There was still much about his doctoral work that remained experimental, and his next research priority involved a focus on the underlying theory.

Schütz now returned to the Technology Institute at Zürich where he spent the year 1993/94 in a supportive role at the Interdisciplinary Project Centre for Super Computers. In 1994 he accepted an opportunity to move to Sweden where he joined the group working with Björn Roos at Lund University, just outside Malmö in the extreme south of the country. He remained at Lund with a post-doctoral fellowship for three years, working on the development of integral-direct correlation methodologies. In 1996 Schütz and his fellow researcher Roland Lindh received the SUP’Prize at the SUP'EUR 96 "computing in science" event at Kraków in recognition of the work. He moved closer to home in 1997 when he joined the group working with Hans-Joachim Werner at Stuttgart. It was at Stuttgart that on 15 February 2001 Schütz received his habilitation (higher post-graduate degree) for work on "Electron Correlation in Large Molecular Systems: From Integral-Direct to Linear Scaling Local Correlation Methods", following which he accepted a lectureship at the university.

In 2004 Schütz was appointed to a full professorship in Theoretical Chemistry at the University of Regensburg. He moved on again in 2016, accepting the professorship in Theoretical Chemistry at the Humboldt University of Berlin which became vacant through the retirement of Professor Emeritus Joachim Sauer.

Martin Schütz was only 54 when he died from illness, surrounded by his family, on 25 February 2018.

== Works ==
The principal focus of Schütz's research was on "ab initio calculations" of the electronic structures of extended molecules (local correlation methods), excited electronic states, and intermolecular forces. During his time at Stuttgart he successfully developed correlation methods scaled in a linear sequence according to molecule size, building on work undertaken by Peter Pulay during the 1980s. The work that Schütz undertook during the first couple of years of the third millennium invokes Post–Hartree–Fock methodologies, applying coupled cluster techniques, and extending to molecules with triple substitutions. Previously they had been limited to small molecules because of the absence of scalability of the methods conditioned by cononinical (and therefore not localised) orthogonal molecular orbital bases.
