= Dominique Girod =

Swiss composer and bassist

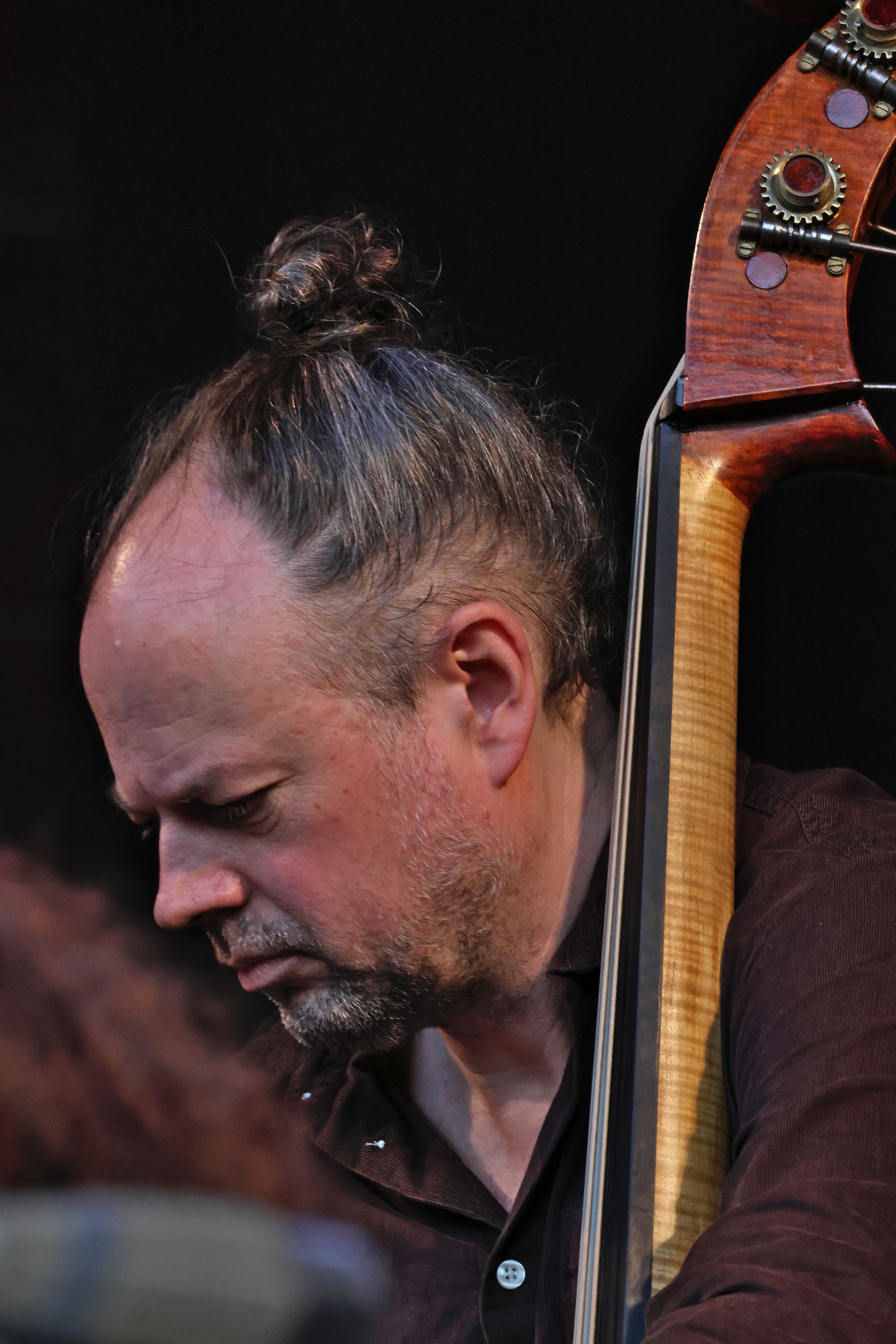
Dominique Girod at Jazz in the Palmengarten 2024

Dominique Girod (born 1975 in Winterthur) is a Swiss composer and bassist.

== Life and career ==
Girod grew up as son of the pantomime and movement pedagogue Ruth Girod and the jazz pianist Roger Girod in Winterthur. From 1993 to 1996 he studied jazz and classical double bass at the Ecole Normale and the American School of Modern Music in Paris with Jean-François Jenny-Clark. Back in Switzerland he studied classical double bass at the Zürich conservatory with Andreas Cincera (diploma 1999) and composition with Michael Jarrell and electronic music and music theory with Gerald Bennett (until 2007).

Girod's main areas of interest are jazz and 20th-century classical music, he has played bass as a leader and as a sideman with Nat Su, Chris Wiesendanger, Christoph Gallio, Dieter Ulrich, Daniel Schenker, Matthias Spillmann, Reto Suhner, Chris Cheek, Kurt Rosenwinkel, Michael Jeffrey Stevens/Miles Griffith, Benny Golson, Jorge Rossy, the Philharmonische Werkstatt Schweiz and the Ensemble für Neue Musik Zürich. Around 2009 he co-founded the sextett "Grünes Blatt", which he writes and arranges music for. Since 2012 Girod plays predominantly on an instrument built by the Zurich luthier Martin Hillmann.

As a composer Girod writes jazz as well as classical music. He has authored a number of commissioned compositions and has worked on songs (mainly Romanian folk songs) for his band "Grünes Blatt". His first opera L'homme qui rit (an adaptation of the novel by the same name by Victor Hugo) was premiered by the Freie Oper Zürich in the Rote Fabrik Zürich in 2013.

Girod teaches double bass (classical and jazz) at the Musikschule Konservatorium Zürich (MKZ) and at the Zurich University of the Arts. Since 2008 he has also lectured on music theory for students of the DAS Kirchenmusik Chorleitung/Orgel courses there.
