= Hilaria Kramer =

Swiss musician in the modern jazz style

Hilaria Kramer (1 June 1967 in Frauenfeld) is a Swiss musician (trumpet, song, composition) in the modern jazz style.

== Biography ==
Kramer began to play trumpet, when she was ten years old. From 1983, she attended the vocational school department of Jazz school St. Gallen, where she studied under Benny Bailey and Art Lande. Afterwards she worked in Italy with Claudio Fasoli's quintet, with Gianluigi Trovesi. She performed with the musicians like Steve Lacy, Enrico Rava, Joe Henderson, Bob Mover, Sal Nistico, Chet Baker or Sangoma Everett. In 1988, she recorded her first album with her own quartet. The album was published in the spring of 1989 (Hilaria Kramer Quartet, Unit Records) In 1991, she performed in the TV program Ladies in Jazz (in Rai Uno) for singers like Nina Simone and Carmen McRae. In the next years, she performed with Uli Scherer in Vienna and also made a tour around Europe. Her discography contains 18 albums.

In 2014, Kramer was awarded the Jazz Prize of the Fondation Suisa "for her services as a musician, composer and band leader as well as her work in various organisations to support Swiss jazz".

== Discography ==
- 1988 The Hilaria Kramer Quartet with Lukas Kramer, Piero Leveratto, Alfred Kramer (Unit Records)
- 1989 Electric Group with Christian Meyer (Splasc (h) Records)
- 1990 Trigon (Splasc (h) Records)
- 2006 Odyssey on Earth (Unit Records)
- 2008 Do Luar (Unit Records)
- 2009 Come Prima (Ubu Records)
- 2011 La Suite with Florian Stoffner, Pietro Leveratto, Daniel Humair (Musiques Suisses)
