= Martin Schütz (musician) =

Swiss cellist (born 1954)

Martin Schütz (born 1954) is a Swiss cellist in the fields of jazz and free improvisation. He is also a composer, film and theater musician.

== Biography ==
After learning classical cello, he tended to jazz and improvisation. From the middle of 80s, he is interested in electronically strengthened music and the electronic change of cello tone, which led to the making of electric 5 string cello. The electric 5 string cello became his main instrument. Schütz has often worked with Butch Morris and Shelley Hirsch and in trio with Barre Phillips and Hans Burgener. He has also played with Paul Lovens, Stephan Wittwer, Marco Käppeli, Saadat Türköz and Lucas Niggli. Since 1990 he has worked regularly in trio with Hans Koch and Fredy Studer. He has collaborated with musicians from other cultures for example with El Nil Troop from Egypt(Heavy Cairo Traffic), with DJs from New York(Rots & Wires) and with the poet Christian Uetz.

In recent years, Schütz has appeared as a composer and live musician in Theaters(with the directors like Luc Bondy, Christoph Marthaler, und Ruedi Häusermann in Zurich, Hamburg, Berlin, Wien and Munich. He also played in dance performances like Anna Huber's performance. He also composed music for radio dramas and movies for Peter Liechti, Dieter Gränicher und Tobias Ineichen.

Martin Schütz lives in Biel.

== Awards ==
- 2011: Music Award of the Canton of Bern
