= Hans Koch (musician) =

Hans Koch (born March 12, 1948) is a Swiss clarinetist, saxophonist, and film score composer. While trained in classical music, he has spent the majority of his career performing in other genres such as jazz, rock, avant-garde, and electronic music.

== Life and career ==
Hans Albrecht Koch was born in Villmergen, Switzerland on March 12, 1948. He trained as a classical clarinetist before joining Werner Lüdi's Sunnymoon; a jazz band with whom he first performed at the Jazz Festival Willisau in 1981. He performed and recorded with a variety of jazz musicians in the 1980s; including recordings made with saxophonist Urs Blöchlinger (1983), Peter Schärli’s quintet (beginning in 1984), Lüdi (1987), and Cecil Taylor’s Big Band Berlin (1988). He traveled with cellist Martin Schütz in 1987 to Manhattan where they worked in the avant-garde music scene.

In 1990 Koch performed and recorded in a jazz trio with pianist Paul Bley and trumpeter Franz Koglmann. That same year he formed another trio with drummer Fredy Studer and Martin Schütz that fused electronic music, jazz, dance music, and avante-garde music. This group recorded the album Hardcore Chambermusic (1994, Intakt Records). In 1993 he founded another trio, Holz für Europa, with multi-instrumentalist woodwind player Wolfgang Fuchs and saxophonist Peter van Bergen. He joined the Barry Guy New Orchestra in 2000.

Koch composed the film scores to Meine Freunde in der DDR (1990), Höhenfeuer (1985), Die Kunst der exakten Phantasie (2006), Das Schiff des Torjägers (2010), Pepe Mujica in Pepe Mujica - Lessons from the Flowerbed (2014), and Stand Up My Beauty (2021).
