= Plainisphare =

Plainisphare is a jazz record label based in Vich, Switzerland. It was founded in 1974.

Since 1974 Plainisphare has been the leading distributor of jazz recordings in Switzerland. In the early 1980s it began to produce recordings, and since then it has released over 100 LPs and CDs.

Artists who have recorded for Plainisphare include Archie Shepp, Thierry Lang, Leon Francioli, Dollar Brand, Terry Riley, Albert Mangelsdorff, René Bottlang, and Heiri Känzig.
