= Michel Wintsch =

- Genres: Avant-garde jazz
- Occupations: Composer; Pianist
- Instrument: Piano

Michel Wintsch (born 1964) is a Swiss avant-garde jazz composer and pianist who has worked with musicians such as Franz Koglmann and Gerry Hemingway. In the 1980s he toured with the group Monkey's Touch.

== Discography ==
- Yves Massy (1993). Nocturne Schématique. Unit.
- The Michel Wintsch Sextet (1994). Autour de Bartók. Unit.
- Michel Wintsch; Martin Schütz; Gerry Hemingway (1994). Wintsch/Schütz/Hemingway. Unit.
- Rosetta (1995). Lune Rousse. Unit.
- Michel Wintsch (1996). Minimum Wital/Yourcenar Echos. Unit.
- Michel Wintsch (1999). Identity. Leo.
- Michel Wintsch (1999). Michel Wintsch & Road Movie. Between the Lines.
- Michel Wintsch (2001). Sharing the Thirst. Leo.
- Christophe Berthet; Vinz Vonlanthen (2002). Effet Papillon. Unit.
- Who Trio (2004). The Current Underneath. Leo.
- WWW (2006). WWW. Leo.
- Michel Wintsch. Waamat. Unit.
