= Stephan Wittwer =

- Born: 1 March 1953; Zürich, Switzerland
- Died: 18 September 2024 (aged 71) Zürich
- Genres: Experimental music, free improvisation
- Occupation: Musician
- Instruments: Electric guitar, classic guitar, computer
- Website: wittwer.mu/index.html/

Stephan Wittwer (1 March 1953 – 18 September 2024) was a Swiss experimental musician, improvisor and composer. Earlier, his main instruments were electric and classical guitar, amplifier and recording studio, but in later years, his instrument was computer.

== Biography ==
Wittwer was born on 1 March 1953 in Zürich. As a child, he took piano lessons and learned guitar by self study. He started to play with the musicians of free jazz such as John Tchicai and Irène Schweizer, when he was a teenager. As a teenager, he worked also with Anton Bruhin, Hans Reichel, Paul Lovens and in a duet with Radu Malfatti. Much later, he started studying classical guitar.

He was a member of Rüdiger Carl's quintet, Werner Lüdi's Sunnymoon and Red twist & Tuned Arrow. In duets, trios and projects, he played with Han Bennink, Donald Miller (Borbetomagus), Steve Lacy, Voice Crack, Pierre Favre, Dietmar Diesner, Alfred Harth, Paul Lytton, Butch Morris, Jim O'Rourke, Christian Marclay, John Zorn, Alex Buess (16–17), Peter Brötzmann, William Parker, SLUDGE 3000, Steamboat Switzerland and many others. His work streams (GROB, Köln 2001) achieved an honorary mention in the field of digital music of Ars Electronica. He wrote occasionally film music mostly for Peter Fischli & David Weiss.

In 1993, he also composed the closing theme for SF DRS programs.
