= Dieter Ulrich =

Swiss musician and historian (born 1958)

- Born: 12 October 1958 (age 68); Zürich, Switzerland
- Genres: Jazz, free improvisation
- Occupations: Musician, art historian
- Instruments: percussion, flugelhorn

Dieter Ulrich (born 12 October 1958) is a Swiss jazz and free improvisation musician (percussion, flugelhorn) and art historian.

== Life and works ==
Ulrich was born on 12 October 1958 in Zürich. He had piano lessons from Irma Schaichet from 1965 to 1980. He learned also playing percussion by self study from 1972. He played at first in several bands with Harald Haerter.

In 1988, he played with his own quintet in the Jazz Festival Zurich. He participated also in Daniel Mouthon's projects. He was a member of the trio AfroGarage with Christoph Baumann and Jacques Siron and appeared in many international festivals.
