= Urs Leimgruber =

Swiss saxophonist

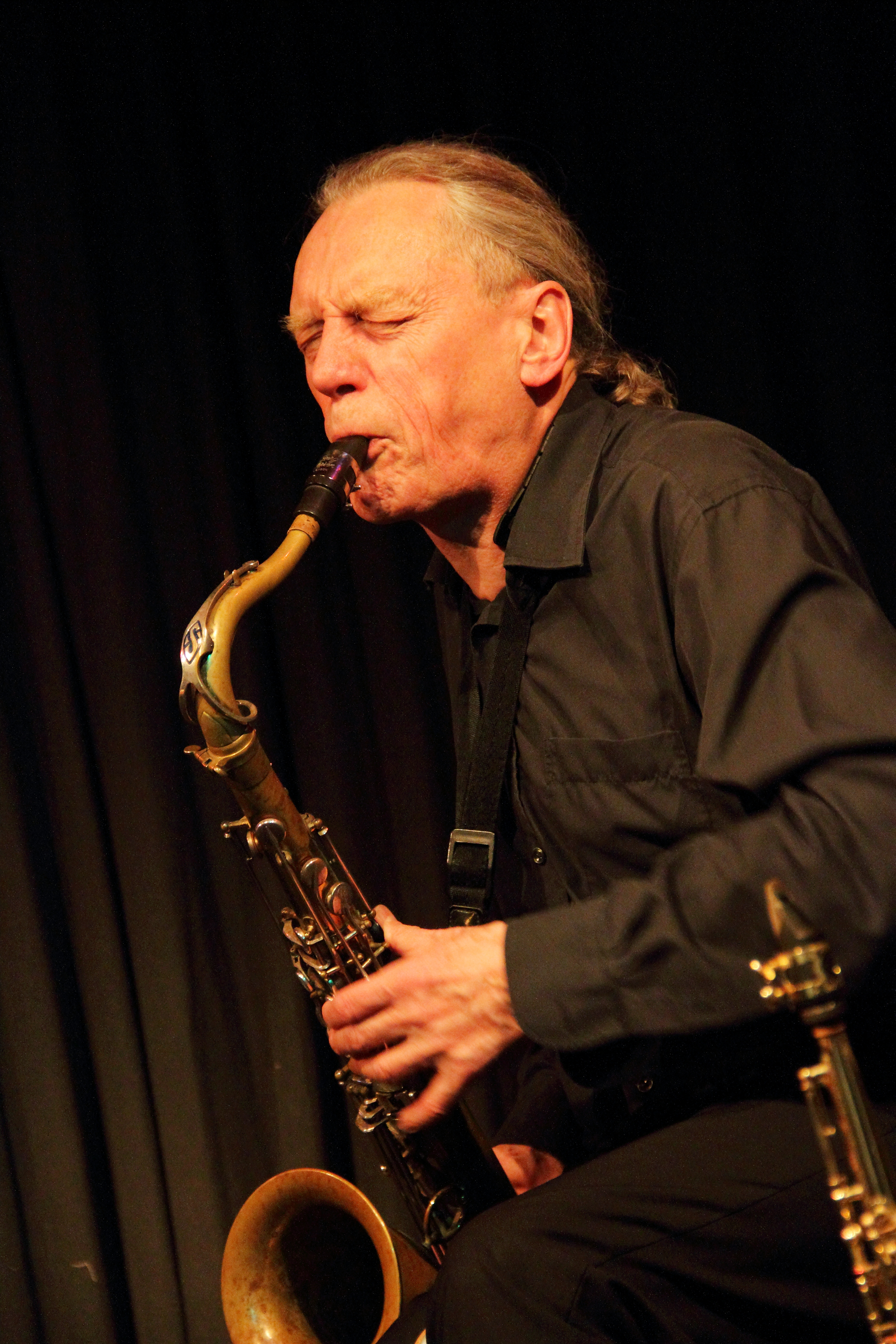
- Urs Leimgruber in 2014
- Born: 1952 (age 73–74); Lucerne, Switzerland
- Occupation: Saxophonist
- Style: Jazz, Free improvisation

Urs Leimgruber (1 January 1952 in Lucerne) is a Swiss saxophonist. He lived in Paris from 1988 to 2005. Then he came back to his home town, Lucerne. His fields of activity are improvisation, Jazz and 20th-century classical music.

== Discography ==
With Steve Lacy

- Itinerary (hat ART, 1991)
