= Lucerne School of Music =

Coordinates: 47.032565°N 8.296945°E

The Lucerne School of Music (Hochschule Luzern – Musik) is a professional school for musicians located in Lucerne, Switzerland, and closely associated with the city's annual music festival. It is a division of the Lucerne University of Applied Sciences and Arts.

== History ==
The school was formed in 1999 when the city's Conservatory of Music, Academy of Church Music, and Jazz School merged into a single university-status institution, called Musikhochschule Luzern (Lucerne College of Music).

The school began offering master's degrees in music in fall 2008. At about the same time, it became a division, or Departement, of the Lucerne University of Applied Sciences and Arts.

Alumni include organist and conductor Andreas Reize (the 18th Thomaskantor after Bach) and jazz pianist Luzia von Wyl.
