= Anthony Braxton discography =

Discography for jazz saxophonist Anthony Braxton.

== Discography ==
=== As leader/co-leader ===
- 1968: 3 Compositions of New Jazz (Delmark, 1968)
- 1969: For Alto (Delmark, 1971)
- 1969: Silence (Freedom, 1975)
- 1969: Anthony Braxton (BYG Actuel, 1969)
- 1970: This Time... (BYG Actuel, 1970)
- 1971: Recital Paris 71 (Futura, 1971)
- 1971: The Complete Braxton 1971 (Arista Freedom, 1977)
- 1971: The Complete Braxton (Freedom, 1973)
- 1971: Together Alone with Joseph Jarman (Delmark, 1974)
- 1972: Donna Lee (America, 1972)
- 1972: Saxophone Improvisations Series F (America, 1972)
- 1972: Town Hall 1972 (Trio, 1972) – live
- 1973: Four Compositions (1973) (Denon, 1977)
- 1974: In the Tradition (SteepleChase, 1974)
- 1974: In the Tradition Volume 2 (SteepleChase, 1976)
- 1974: Solo: Live at Moers Festival (Ring, 1976) – live
- 1974: Quartet: Live at Moers Festival (Ring, 1976) – live
- 1974: First Duo Concert with Derek Bailey (Emanem, 1974) – live
- 1974: Trio and Duet (Sackville, 1974)
- 1974: New York, Fall 1974 (Arista, 1975)
- 1975: Five Pieces 1975 (Arista, 1975)
- 1975–1976: The Montreux/Berlin Concerts (Arista, 1977)
- 1971–1976: News from the 70s (Musica Jazz/Felmay, 1998)
- 1976: Creative Orchestra Music 1976 (Arista, 1976)
- 1976: Elements of Surprise with George E. Lewis (Moers, 1985) – live
- 1976: Duets 1976 (Arista, 1976) – with Muhal Richard Abrams
- 1976: Donaueschingen (Duo) 1976 (hatART, 1994) – live
- 1976: Dortmund (Quartet) 1976 (HatART, 1991) – live
- 1977: Quintet (Basel) 1977 (hatOLOGY, 2000) – live
- 1977: For Trio (Arista, 1978)
- 1978: Solo (Köln) 1978 (Golden Years of New Jazz , 2002) – live
- 1978: Creative Orchestra (Köln) 1978 (hatART, 1995) – live
- 1978: For Four Orchestras (Arista, 1978)
- 1978: Birth and Rebirth with Max Roach (Black Saint, 1978)
- 1978–1979: Alto Saxophone Improvisations 1979 (Arista, 1979)
- 1979: Solo (Milano) 1979, Vol. 1 (Golden Years of New Jazz, 2003)
- 1979: Performance (Quartet) 1979 (hatART, 1981) – live
- 1979: Anthony Braxton / Robert Schumann String Quartet (Sound Aspects, 1986) – live
- 1979: Seven Compositions 1978 (Moers, 1980)
- 1980: Composition No. 94 for Three Instrumentalists (1980) (Golden Years of New Jazz, 1999) – live
- 1980: For Two Pianos (Arista, 1982)
- 1981: Composition 98 (hatART, 1981)
- 1981: Composition No. 96 (Leo, 1989)
- 1981: Six Compositions: Quartet (Antilles, 1982)
- 1982: Open Aspects '82 with Richard Teitelbaum (hatART, 1982)
- 1982: Six Duets (1982) with John Lindberg (Cecma, 1982)
- 1982: Solo (Pisa) 1982 (Golden Years of New Jazz, 2007) – live
- 1983: Four Compositions (Quartet) 1983 (Black Saint, 1983)
- 1983: Composition 113 (Sound Aspects, 1984)
- 1984: Prag 1984 (Quartet Performance) (Sound Aspects, 1990) – live
- 1985: Seven Standards (1985) Vols. 1 & 2 (Magenta, 1985)
- 1985: Six Compositions (Quartet) 1984 (Black Saint, 1985)
- 1985: Quartet (London) 1985 (Leo, 1988) – live
- 1985: Quartet (Birmingham) 1985 (Leo, 1991) – live
- 1985: Quartet (Coventry) 1985 (Leo, 1987) – live
- 1986: Five Compositions (Quartet) 1986 (Black Saint, 1986)
- 1986: Moment Précieux with Derek Bailey (Les Disques Victo, 1987)
- 1987: Six Monk's Compositions (1987) (Black Saint, 1987)
- 1988: 19 (Solo) Compositions, 1988 (New Albion, 1989) – live
- 1988: Solo (London) 1988 (Impetus, 1991)
- 1988: The Aggregate with Rova Saxophone Quartet (Sound Aspects, 1988) – live
- 1988: Ensemble (Victoriaville) 1988 (Victo, 1992) – live
- 1988: 2 Compositions (Järvenpää) 1988 (Leo, 1996) – live with Ensemble Braxtonia
- 1988: A Memory of Vienna with Ran Blake (hatOLOGY, 1997)
- 1988: Four Compositions (Solo, Duo & Trio) 1982/1988 (hatART, 1989)
- 1988: Kol Nidre with Andrew Voigt (Sound Aspects, 1990)
- 1989: Eugene (1989) (Black Saint, 1989) – live with the Northwest Creative Orchestra
- 1989: Seven Compositions (Trio) 1989 (hatART, 1990) – live
- 1989: Duets Vancouver 1989 with Marilyn Crispell (Music & Arts, 1990) – live
- 1989: Eight (+3) Tristano Compositions, 1989: For Warne Marsh (hatART, 1990)
- 1991: Duets: Hamburg 1991 with Peter Niklas Wilson (Music & Arts, 1992)
- 1991: 2 Compositions (Ensemble) 1989/1991 (hatART, 1992)
- 1991: Willisau (Quartet) 1991 (hatART, 1992) – partially live
- 1991: Duo (Amsterdam) 1991 with Georg Gräwe (Okka Disk, 1997) – live
- 1992: Composition No. 165 (for 18 instruments) (New Albion, 1992) – live
- 1992: (Victoriaville) 1992 (Victo, 1993) – live
- 1992: Wesleyan (12 Altosolos) 1992 (hatART, 1993) – live
- 1993: Duets (1993) with Mario Pavone (Music & Arts, 1993)
- 1993: 9 Standards (Quartet) 1993 (Leo, 1993) – live
- 1993: Trio (London) 1993 with Evan Parker and Paul Rutherford (Leo, 1994)
- 1993: Duo (London) 1993 with Evan Parker (Leo, 1993)
- 1993: Twelve Compositions (Music & Arts, 1994) – live
- 1993: Quartet (Santa Cruz) 1993 (hatART, 1997) – live
- 1993: Anthony Braxton's Charlie Parker Project 1993 (hatART, 1995)
- 1993: Sextet (Parker) 1993 (New Braxton House, 2018)[11CD]
- 1993: Duo (Leipzig) 1993 (Music & Arts, 1995) – with Ted Reichman
- 1994: Composition No. 174 (Leo, 1994) – live
- 1994: Compositions 175 & 126 (Leo, 2006)[2CD]
- 1994: Duo (Wesleyan) 1994 with Abraham Adzenyah (Leo, 1995) – live
- 1994: Duet: Live at Merkin Hall with Richard Teitelbaum (Music & Arts, 1996) – live
- 1994: Piano Quartet, Yoshi's 1994 (Music & Arts, 1996) – live
- 1994: Knitting Factory (Piano/Quartet) 1994, Vol. 1 (Leo, 1995) – live
- 1994: Knitting Factory (Piano/Quartet) 1994, Vol. 2 (Leo, 2000) – live
- 1994: Small Ensemble Music (Wesleyan) 1994 (Splasc(h), 1999) – live
- 1994: Composition No. 173 (Black Saint, 1996)
- 1995: Seven Standards 1995 with Mario Pavone (Knitting Factory, 1995)
- 1995: 11 Compositions (Duo) 1995 with Brett Larner (Leo, 1997) – live
- 1995: 10 Compositions (Duet) 1995 with Joe Fonda (Konnex, 1996) – live
- 1995: Four Compositions (Quartet) 1995 (Braxton House, 1997) – live
- 1995: Six Standards (Quintet) 1996 (Splasc(H), 2004) – live
- 1995: Octet (New York) 1995 (Braxton House, 1997) – live
- 1995: Ensemble (New York) 1995 (Braxton House, 1997) – live
- 1995: Solo Piano (Standards) 1995 (No More, 1996?)[2CD]
- 1996: 14 Compositions (Traditional) 1996 with Stewart Gillmor (Leo, 1998) – live
- 1996: Composition No. 102 for Orchestra & Puppet Theatre (Braxton House, 1996) – live
- 1996: Composition 192 with Lauren Newton (Leo, 1998) – live
- 1996: Tentet (New York) 1996 (Braxton House, 1998) – live
- 1996: Sextet (Istanbul) 1996 (Braxton House, 1996) – live
- 1996: Trillium R (Braxton House, 1999)[4CD]
- 1997: Compositions 10 & 16 (+101) (hatART, 1998)
- 1997: Ninetet (Yoshi's) 1997 Vol. 1 (Leo, 2002) – live
- 1997: Ninetet (Yoshi's) 1997 Vol. 2 (Leo, 2002) – live
- 1997: Ninetet (Yoshi's) 1997 Vol. 3 (Leo, 2005) – live
- 1997: Ninetet (Yoshi's) 1997 Vol. 4 (Leo, 2002) – live
- 1998: Two Compositions (Trio) 1998 (Leo, 2003) – live
- 1998: 4 Compositions (Washington D.C.) 1998 (Braxton House, 1999)[2CD]
- 2000: Four Compositions (GTM) 2000 (Delmark, 2003)
- 2000: Composition No. 247 (Leo, 2000)
- 2000: Nine Compositions (Hill) 2000 (CIMP, 2001)
- 2000: Ten Compositions (Quartet) 2000 (CIMP, 2000)
- 2000: Compositions/Improvisations 2000 (CIMP, 2000) – with Scott Rosenberg
- 2000: Composition No. 169 + (186 + 206 + 214) (Leo, 2001)
- 2001: Eight Compositions (Quintet) 2001 (CIMP, 2001)
- 2001: 8 Standards (Wesleyan 2001) (Barking Hoop Recordings , 2002)[2CD]
- 2002: Duets [Wesleyan] 2002 with Taylor Ho Bynum (Innova Recordings, 2002)
- 2002: Solo (NYC) 2002 ( Parallactic Recordings, 2003)
- 2002: Duo Palindrome 2002 Vols. 1 and 2 (Intakt) with Andrew Cyrille (Intakt, 2004)
- 2003: ABCD (NotTwo, 2013)
- 2003: Triotone with György Szabados and Vladimir Tarasov (Leo, 2004)
- 2003: 23 Standards (Quartet) 2003 (Leo, 2004) – live
- 2003: 20 Standards (Quartet) 2003 (Leo, 2005) – live
- 2003: 19 Standards (Quartet) 2003 (Leo, 2010) – live
- 2004: Shadow Company with Milo Fine (Emanem, 2005)
- 2004: Live at the Royal Festival Hall (Leo, 2006) – live
- 2005: Duo (Victoriaville) 2005 with Fred Frith (Les Disques Victo, 2006)
- 2005: Quartet 2006: Ghost Trance Music (Important, 2008)[4CD] – live
- 2005: 4 Compositions (Ulrichsberg) 2005 (Phonomanie VIII) (Leo, 2006)[4CD]
- 2007: Trio (Victoriaville) 2007 (Victo, 2007) – live
- 2007: Old Dogs (2007) with Gerry Hemingway (Mode, 2010)[4CD]
- 2007: Anthony Braxton & the AIMToronto Orchestra Creative Orchestra (Guelph) 2007 (Spool, 2009)
- 2008: Beyond Quantum (Tzadik, 2008)
- 2008: Duets (Pittsburgh) 2008 with Ben Opie (OMP, 2010)[2CD]
- 2008: Quartet (Moscow) 2008 (Leo, 2009) – live
- 2008: Quartet (Mestre) 2008 (Caligola, 2008)
- 2008: Improvisations (Duo) 2008 with Maral Yakshieva (SoLyd, 2009)[2CD]
- 2011: 3 Compositions (EEMHM) 2011 (Firehouse 12, 2016)[3CD]
- 2011: Echo Echo Mirror House (Victo, 2013) – live
- 2012: 12 Duets (New Braxton House, 2014)[12CD]
- 2012: Quartet Warsaw 2012 (For Tune, 2013)
- 2013: Trio (New Haven) 2013 (New Braxton House, 2014)[4CD]
- 2013: Ensemble Montaigne (BAU 4) 2013 (Leo, 2013)
- 2013: Duo (DCWM) 2013 (RogueArt, 2016)[2CD]
- 2014: Quintet (Tristano) 2014 (New Braxton House, 2016)[7CD]
- 2014: Trillium J (The Non-Unconfessionables) (New Braxton House, 2016)[4CD + Blu-ray] – live
- 2014: Quartet (New Haven) 2014 (Firehouse 12, 2019)[4CD]
- 2017: Solo (Victoriaville) 2017 (Victo, 2017) – live
- 2017: Duo (Improv) 2017 with Eugene Chadbourne (New Braxton House, 2020)[8CD]
- 2018: Duo (Bologna) 2018 with Jacqueline Kerrod (I Dischi Di Angelica, 2020)
- 2020: Quartet (Standards) 2020 (New Braxton House, 2021)[13CD]
- 2021: Duet (Other Minds) 2021 with James Fei (Other Minds, 2022) – live

=== As a member ===
Circle

- Circle 1: Live in Germany Concert (CBS/Sony Japan, 1971) – rec. 1970
- Circle 2: Gathering (CBS/Sony Japan, 1971) – rec. 1971
- Paris Concert (ECM, 1972) – rec. 1971
- Circling In (Blue Note, 1975) – rec. 1970
- Circulus (Blue Note, 1978) – rec. 1970

Creative Construction Company

- Creative Construction Company (Muse, 1975) – rec. 1970
- Creative Construction Company Vol. II (Muse, 1976) – rec. 1970

=== As sideman ===
- 1968 Muhal Richard Abrams, Levels and Degrees of Light (Delmark)
- 1969 Gunter Hampel, The 8th of July 1969 (Birth)
- 1969 Jacques Coursil, Black Suite (BYG Actuel)
- 1969 Alan Silva and his Celestrial Communications Orchestra, Luna Surface (BYG Actuel)
- 1970 Marion Brown, Afternoon of a Georgia Faun (ECM)
- 1973 Dave Holland, Conference of the Birds (ECM)
- 1974 Derek Bailey, Royal Volume 1 (Incus)
- 1975 Leroy Jenkins, For Players Only (JCOA)
- 1976 Dave Brubeck, All The Things We Are (Atlantic)
- 1977 Woody Shaw, The Iron Men (Muse)
- 1979 Max Roach, One in Two - Two in One (Hathut)
- 1979 Roscoe Mitchell, Sketches from Bamboo (Moers)
- 1985 György Szabados, Szabraxtondos (Hungaroton-Krém)
- 1988 Barry Guy and the London Jazz Composers Orchestra, Zurich Concerts (Intakt)
- 1995 David Rosenboom, Two Lines (Lovely)
- 1997 Borah Bergman, Eight by Three (Mixtery)
- 2003 Wadada Leo Smith, Organic Resonance (Pi)
- 2003 Wadada Leo Smith, Saturn, Conjunct the Grand Canyon in a Sweet Embrace (Pi)
- 2006 Wolf Eyes, Black Vomit (Les Disques Victo)
