= André Vida =

American-born German musician

- Also known as: Vidatone
- Born: 1974 (age 51–52)
- Origin: United States
- Genres: Jazz
- Occupations: Instrumentalist, lyricist, composer
- Instrument: Saxophone
- Formerly of: Ghost Trance Ensemble
- Website: www.vidatone.com

André Vida (born 1974) is an American-born German saxophonist, lyricist, avant-garde musician, and experimental composer. Vida has been on the forefront of several major developments in experimental music, including his membership in Anthony Braxton’s original Ghost Trance Ensemble, as founding member of New York collective the CTIA, performances with The Tower Recordings and subsequent ‘freak folk’ groups. He is based in Berlin.

== Early life and education ==
André Vida was born in 1974 in the United States. His father was Julius A. Vida (1928–2018), a Hungarian refugee to the U.S. during the Hungarian Revolution of 1956; and a prominent chemist and pharmaceutical businessperson in Greenwich, Connecticut, U.S.. His sister is visual artist, Katie Vida.

Throughout the 1990s, Vida played in bands with Anthony Braxton, a professor of music at Wesleyan University. In 1995, Vida moved to New York City and co-founded the Creative Trans-Informational Alliance Presents (CTIA) with Brandon Evans and Dominique Eade. Vida graduated from Wesleyan University in 1997. He received a M.F.A. degree in experimental sound practices in 2005 from the school of music at California Institute of the Arts (CalArts).

== Career ==
In 2001, Vida moved to Berlin and soon after launched the Kreuzberg suite, a once a week concert series with Vida and a frequently changing musical guest creating improvisational music around the subject of "Fish And Green".

His musical language is informed by an awareness of the human body and its limits. Vida worked in a collaboration with Anri Sala for the exhibition "3-2-1" at The Serpentine Gallery in London. Vida was scheduled to perform over 400 improvisational saxophone concerts over the course of 51 days (from October 1 to November 20, 2011).

Vida was an Eyebeam Honorary Fellow in 2013. In 2013, as part of the Global Art Forum 7, Vida performed "Score" at the Mathaf: Arab Museum of Modern Art, challenging the question what if we spoke music instead of words?

The 2015 Sculpture Park, Frieze Art Fair London presented a live performance by Anri Sala in collaboration with André Vida. The piece is called To Each His Own (in Bridges), it is based on 74 pieces of music, combining fragments of jazz, folk, and pop songs played on the saxophone, clarinet and trombone.

In 2016, Vida participated in the art exhibition, "Anri Sala: Answer Me,” at the New Museum in New York City. Vida live improvises sound with his saxophone next to a video of Jemeel Moondoc’s performance, shot on the balcony of a building in Berlin.

Vida has collaborated with artists such as; Elton John, MV & EE, Anaïs Croze, Kevin Blechdom, Oni Ayhun, Tim Exile, Anri Sala, James Tenney, David Rosenboom, Sonny Simmons, Cecil Taylor, Lee Ranaldo, Heatsick, Jim O'Rourke, Dean Roberts, Tony Buck, Hildur Gudnadottir, Jimmy Edgar, Chilly Gonzales, Mocky, Tyshawn Sorey, Susie Ibarra, Guillermo E. Brown, and many others.

== Discography ==
Year	Title	Artist(s)	Vida's Role	Label	Notes
1994	Composition No. 8 'Pinnacles & Tentacles	Brandon Evans Quintet (Hildegard Kleeb, André Vida, Joe Fonda, Eric Rosenthal, Brandon Evans)	Soprano saxophone, Hungarian shepherd's flute (Track 3)	Parallactic	
1994	Small Ensemble Music (Wesleyan) 1994	Anthony Braxton	Baritone saxophone, tenor saxophone (track 1)	Splasc(H)	
1995	The Sky Has Melted Away	Brandon Evans, Andre Vida, and Dominique Eade	Soprano, alto, tenor saxophone, Hungarian shepherd flute		
1996	Tentet (New York) 1996	Anthony Braxton	B♭ soprano saxophone, alto saxophone, tenor saxophone, baritone saxophone	Braxton House	
1997	Octet (New York) 1995	Anthony Braxton		Braxton House	
1999	Four Compositions (Washington, D.C.) 1998	Anthony Braxton		Braxton House	
2001	GTM (Knitting Factory) 1997	Anthony Braxton		Braxton House	
2001	Folkscene	The Tower Recordings		Communion	
2002	Ninetet (Yoshi's) 1997 Vol. 1	Anthony Braxton	Tenor saxophone, alto saxophone, soprano saxophone, baritone saxophone	Leo	
2003	Parallactic 54	Anthony Braxton, Sonny Simmons, Brandon Evans, Shanir Blumenkranz, Andre Vida, and Mike Pride	Baritone Saxophone	Parallactic	2 CD set, recorded May 2003 at Wesleyan University
2003	Ninetet (Yoshi's) 1997 Vol. 2	Anthony Braxton	Tenor saxophone, alto saxophone, soprano saxophone, baritone saxophone	Leo	
2005	Ninetet (Yoshi's) 1997 Vol. 3	Anthony Braxton	Tenor saxophone, alto saxophone, soprano saxophone, baritone saxophone	Leo	
2005	Multiply	Jamie Lidell	Horns	Warp Records	
2005	Child Real Eyes	Andre Vida, Anthony Braxton, Loren Dempster, Tyshawn Sorey	As band leader, composer, reeds	Vidatone Recordings	
2007	Ninetet (Yoshi's) 1997 Vol. 4	Anthony Braxton		Leo	
2008	I Dont Know Whats Wrong With Me, My Computer Eyes Or My Internet Knees	Andre Vida	As band leader	Insubordinations	
2008	1956: Solo Saxophone	Andre Vida	As band leader		
2011	BRUD Volumes I - III: 1995–2011	Andre Vida	As band leader	Pan	
2011	Quartet (Mannheim) 2010	Anthony Braxton	Alto saxophone, baritone saxophone	New Braxton House	Recorded at Enjoy Jazz Festival, Mannheim, Germany.
2012	Quintet (Tristano) 1997	Anthony Braxton		New Braxton House	

== Publications ==
- Vida, André; Lissoni, Andrea; Wood, Catherine (2017). Tarek Atoui: The Reverse Collection/the Reverse Session. Mousse Publishing. ISBN 9788867492596.
