= Duo (Victoriaville) 2005 =

Live album by Anthony Braxton and Fred Frith

Live album by Anthony Braxton and Fred Frith
- Released: May 23, 2006
- Recorded: May 20, 2005
- Venue: Festival International de Musique Actuelle de Victoriaville, Quebec, Canada
- Genre: Free improvisation
- Length: 56:12
- Label: Les Disques Victo (Canada)

Anthony Braxton chronology
10 Compositions (Duet) 1995 (1996)	Duo (Victoriaville) 2005 (2006)	Trio (Victoriaville) 2007 (2007)

Fred Frith chronology
The Compass, Log and Lead (2006)	Duo (Victoriaville) 2005 (2006)	Ironic Universe (2006)

Duo (Victoriaville) 2005 is a 2006 live album of improvised music by Anthony Braxton and Fred Frith. It was recorded on May 20, 2005 at the 22nd Festival International de Musique Actuelle de Victoriaville in Quebec, Canada, and released in May 2006 by Les Disques Victo, the festival's record label.

== Reception ==
Professional ratings
Review scores
Source	Rating
AllMusic	3.5/5 stars
All About Jazz	favorable
The Penguin Guide to Jazz Recordings	4/4 stars

In a review at AllMusic, Thom Jurek referred to Braxton and Frith as "two graying lions of free improvisation [and] innovation", and called their performance on the album "very inspired, playful, and in places, breathtaking". Jurek was particularly impressed with "Improvisation No 3", which he described as "wooly, but ... also so utterly intuitive and sensible it nearly feels like a composed piece".

Writing in All About Jazz Kurt Gottschalk called Braxton and Frith "master improviser[s]: not quoting past masters, not riffing off each other, but simply playing with conviction and having the patience, fortitude, technique and vision to stick with and develop ideas without inflating egos". He described this collaboration as "a chance encounter that paid off royally".

== Track listing ==
All music by Anthony Braxton and Fred Frith.

No.	Title	Length
1.	"Improvisation No 1"	11:07
2.	"Improvisation No 2"	10:53
3.	"Improvisation No 3"	22:52
4.	"Improvisation No 4"	3:19
5.	"Improvisation No 5"	8:02

Sources: Liner notes, Discogs, Anthony Braxton discography, Fred Frith discography.

== Personnel ==
- Anthony Braxton – alto saxophone, soprano saxophone, sopranino saxophone
- Fred Frith – electric guitar

Sources: Liner notes, Discogs, Anthony Braxton discography, Fred Frith discography.
