= Kevin Norton =

American percussionist and composer

Kevin Norton (born January 21, 1956) is an American percussionist and composer active in the New York City jazz and contemporary music scenes. He has performed and recorded with a diverse group of musicians, including Anthony Braxton, Paul Dunmall, Milt Hinton, Fred Frith, David Krakauer, Joëlle Léandre, Frode Gjerstad, Wilber Morris, James Emery, Bern Nix, and many others. In 1999, he founded Barking Hoop Recordings, a record label dedicated to releasing new and original music. Kevin Norton has also spent summers at camp Encore/Coda in Maine teaching music theory classes and private percussion classes. The label has released 11 CDs to date, which feature Norton's own groups as well as artists such as Anthony Braxton, Kevin O'Neil, Billy Stein, and the String Trio of New York.

== Education and career ==
Born in Brooklyn, NY, Norton grew up in Staten Island and later studied composition at CUNY's Hunter College, where he began his association with bassist Milt Hinton. Norton would later record the album The Judge's Decision with Hinton in 1986. Upon graduation from Hunter College, he attended the Manhattan School of Music and earned his Master's degree in classical percussion. After school he began getting involved with the "downtown New York City" scene, and began working with Fred Frith's experimental rock band Keep the Dog (which also featured saxophonist John Zorn and harpist Zeena Parkins). Some other collaborators during this period include Phillip Johnston and Joel Forrester. Beginning in 1998, Norton is currently teaching at William Paterson University.

He began the Barking Hoop label in 1999 with a live concert recording of a piece he composed for the French situationist theorist Guy Debord, "with Braxton cast as sideman. 'I taped the concert, not thinking I was going to put it out,' Norton says. 'But I was so happy with the results that I thought, well, this should come out.'"

More recently, Norton has been working in various configurations with musicians Tony Malaby, Dave Ballou, John Lindberg, Scott Robinson, Connie Crothers, and J. D. Parran.

== Discography ==
=== As leader ===
- Framework with Laura Seaton, Erik Friedlander (Newport Classic, 1991)
- Ankle to Nose (Amf music, 1994)
- Integrated Variables (CIMP, 1996)
- Knots (Music & Arts, 1998)
- For Guy Debord (in Nine Events) with Anthony Braxton (Barking Hoop, 1999)
- In Context/Out of Context (Barking Hoop, 2000)
- Change Dance Troubled Energy (Barking Hoop, 2001)
- Iron Monkey Trio (CIMP, 2001)
- Play the Music of Anthony Braxton (Barking Hoop, 2001)
- Rylickolum: for Your Pleasure with Paul Dunmall & Paul Rogers (CIMP, 2003)
- Intuitive Structures (Cadence, 2003)
- Not Only in That Golden Tree... (Clean Feed, 2003)
- The Dream Catcher (for Wilber Morris) (CIMP, 2003)
- Ocean of Earth with Joelle Leandre (Barking Hoop, 2003)
- No Definitive with Frode Gjerstad (FMR, 2004)
- Time-Space Modulator (Barking Hoop, 2004)
- Go Forth Duck with Paul Dunmall & Paul Rogers (CIMP, 2004)
- Quark Bercuse Solo Percussion Vol I (FMR, 2005)
- The Bright Lights the Big Day with Paul Rogers (FMR, 2005)
- The Walk with Frode Gjerstad (FMR, 2006)
- Winter in New York 2006 with Joelle Leandre (Leo, 2007)
- Antioch with Frode Gjerstad (Ayler, 2008)
- Zinc Nine Psychedelic with Dave Ballou (Punos Music, 2009)
- Tipples with Frode Gjerstad (FMR, 2011)
- Live Tipple with Frode Gjerstad (FMR, 2013)

=== As sideman ===
With Anthony Braxton

- Small Ensemble Music (Wesleyan) 1994 (Splasc(H), 1999)
- Four Compositions (Quartet) 1995 (Braxton House, 1997)
- Sextet (Istanbul) 1996 (Braxton House 1996)
- Tentet (New York) 1996 (Braxton House, 1996)
- Octet (New York) 1995 (Braxton House, 1997)
- Ensemble (New York) 1995 (Braxton House, 1997)
- Trillium R (Braxton House 1999)
- Ten Compositions (Quartet) 2000 (CIMP, 2000)
- Nine Compositions (Hill) 2000 (CIMP, 2001)
- 8 Standards (Wesleyan) 2001 (Barking Hoop, 2002)
- Ninetet (Yoshi's) 1997 Vol. 1 (Leo, 2002)
- Ninetet (Yoshi's) 1997 Vol. 2 (Leo, 2003)
- 23 Standards (Quartet) 2003 (Leo, 2004)
- Ninetet (Yoshi's) 1997 Vol. 3 (Leo, 2005)
- 20 Standards (Quartet) 2003 (Leo, 2005)
- Ninetet (Yoshi's) 1997 Vol. 4 (Leo, 2007)
- 19 Standards (Quartet) 2003 (Leo, 2010)
- Composition, Improvisation, Synthesis (New Braxton House, 2011)
- Tentet (Paris) 2001 (New Braxton House, 2013)

With Phillip Johnston

- Phillip Johnston's Big Trouble (Black Saint, 1993)
- The Unknown (Avant, 1994)
- Flood at the Ant Farm (Black Saint, 1995)
- Music for Films (Tzadik, 1998)

With David Krakauer

- Klezmer, NY (Tzadik, 1998)
- A New Hot One (Label Bleu, 2000)
- The Twelve Tribes (Label Bleu, 2002)

With others

- Dave Ballou, Dancing Foot (SteepleChase, 2004)
- Anthony Coleman, Pushy Blueness (Tzadik, 2006)
- Anthony Coleman, Lapidation (New World, 2008)
- Paul Dunmall, Ancient and Future Airs (Clean Feed, 2009)
- James Emery, Spectral Domains (Enja, 1998)
- James Emery, Luminous Cycles (Between the Lines, 2000)
- Joe Fonda, Full Circle Suite (CIMP, 1999)
- Fred Frith, Step Across the Border (RecRec Music, 1990)
- Milt Hinton, The Judge's Decision (Exposure, 1984)
- Joelle Leandre, Live at the Ulrichsberger Kaleidophon (Leo, 2011)
- Steve Lehman, Structural Fire (CIMP, 2001)
- Steve Lehman, Camoflage (CIMP, 2002)
- John Lindberg, [A] Live at Roulette, NYC (Jazzwerkstatt, 2011)
- John Lindberg, Born in an Urban Ruin (Clean Feed, 2016)
- Frank London, The Debt (Tzadik, 1997)
- Denman Maroney, Fluxations (New World, 2003)
- Bill Mobley, Hittin' Home (Space Time, 2016)
- J. D. Parran, Omegathorp: Living City (Y'All of New York, 2005)
- Sonny Simmons, Universal Prayer/Survival Skills (Parallactic, 1999)
- Soldier String Quartet, Sojourner Truth (Newport Classic, 1991)
- Steve Swell, This Now! (Cadence, 2003)
- Steve Swell, Suite for Players, Listeners and Other Dreamers (CIMP, 2003)
- John Zorn, Nosferatu (Tzadik, 2012)
