= Jackson Moore =

American jazz musician

Jackson Moore is an alto saxophonist and composer living in New York.

== Career ==
When he was 17, Moore studied with Jackie McLean and Anthony Braxton in Connecticut. Between 1997 and 2001, Moore toured with Braxton and participated in the development of his Ghost Trance music.

From 2010 to 2013, Moore worked at Eyebeam Art and Technology Center, where he explored auditory localization and social practice. Moore then moved to Bennington College as their digital arts technician from Spring 2015 to Autumn 2016.

As well as organizing an annual Jazz event called the New Languages Festival, Moore is also known for designing Moss, a musical language modeled on pidgins.

== Discography ==
With Anthony Braxton

- Ninetet (Yoshi's) 1997 Vol. 1 (Leo, 1997 [2002])
- Ninetet (Yoshi's) 1997 Vol. 2 (Leo, 1997 [2003])
- Ninetet (Yoshi's) 1997 Vol. 3 (Leo, 1997 [2003])
- Ninetet (Yoshi's) 1997 Vol. 4 (Leo, 1997 [2007])
- Two Compositions (Trio) 1998 (Leo, 1998 [2003])
