= History of Jazz in Reverse =

Studio album by FAB Trio
- Released: 2011
- Recorded: December 13, 2005
- Studio: Kampo Studios, New York City
- Genre: Free jazz
- Length: 1:05:35
- Label: TUM Records; CD 028
- Producer: Petri Haussila

FAB Trio chronology
| Live in Amsterdam (2009) | History of Jazz in Reverse (2011) |

History of Jazz in Reverse is the fifth and final album by the FAB Trio, a collaborative ensemble named after the first letters of the musicians' last names, featuring double bassist Joe Fonda, drummer Barry Altschul, and violinist Billy Bang. It was recorded on December 13, 2005, at Kampo Studios in New York City, and was released in 2011 by TUM Records, shortly after Bang's death from cancer.

== Reception ==
Professional ratings
Review scores
| Source | Rating |
|---|---|
| All About Jazz | 4/5 stars |
| All About Jazz | 4.5/5 stars |
| Jazzwise | 3/5 stars |
| Tom Hull – on the Web | A− |

In a review for All About Jazz, Nic Jones stated that the album "appeals in differing measures to both the head and the heart, serving notice of just how infrequently this mix is successfully caught on record." AAJ writer Jerry D'Souza commented: "This final recording from Bang is not only testimony to his remarkable prowess, it stands as a cornerstone of music that is consummate and insightful."

Kevin Le Gendre of Jazzwise called Bang "a tremendously sensitive player," and wrote: "That is in evidence in no uncertain terms here and his passing... lends an added poignancy." He noted that while the trio is "highly effective when playing either straight on the beat swing or whirling modes, they reach their greatest moments of inspiration when they jockey around with the time feel."

Paris Transatlantic's Jason Bivins described the album as "a terrific session with especially great invention from Bang throughout," and remarked: "the whole is charged with energy but is understated nonetheless. Leagues better than most mindless free jazz blowing sessions."

Writing for The Denver Post, Bret Saunders included the album in his list of 2011's "top 10 satisfying CDs," stating that the musicians "soar, collide and cohere gloriously for an hour," and commenting: "I've never been much of a violin guy, but believe me: This would rank near the top of any serious jazz follower's list."

In an article for The New York City Jazz Record, Robert Iannapollo called the album "a corker," and wrote: "Bang is the obvious focus of this group and his playing was superb when prodded by Fonda and Altschul... the fire and brio this trio was known for is there throughout, a fitting finale release for a band that enlivened the past decade."

Point of Departure's Brian Morton stated: "It's arguably Bang's most pro-active and exploratory session for many years... generating massy string effects with Fonda and relieving Altschul of sentry duty on the metre-fence with those brilliantly articulated percussive strikes with the bow; you could run a clock over Bang's sense of time and you wouldn't find him a nano-second out."

S. Victor Aaron of Something Else! remarked: "there's an affinity that can only develop amongst masters familiar with each other: Altschul and Fonda are often the guys going off and playing free whilst Bang is weaving the melody... I don't know if there are any more unreleased treasures of Billy Bang recordings yet to see the light of day, but no more is required to cement Bang's legacy as a jazz violinist who forged his own path and enhanced avant garde jazz in the process."

== Track listing ==
1. "Homeward Bound" (Barry Altschul / Billy Bang / Joe Fonda) – 15:44
2. "Implications" (Barry Altschul / Billy Bang / Joe Fonda) – 9:52
3. "For Bea" (Barry Altschul / Billy Bang / Joe Fonda) – 5:26
4. "From Here to There" (Barry Altschul / Billy Bang / Joe Fonda) – 8:08
5. "Chan Chan" (Compay Segundo) – 7:11
6. "History of Jazz in Reverse" (Barry Altschul / Billy Bang / Joe Fonda) – 8:04
7. "One for Don Cherry" (Billy Bang) – 6:07
8. "From the Waters of New Orleans" (Barry Altschul / Billy Bang / Joe Fonda) – 5:03

== Personnel ==
- Billy Bang – violin
- Joe Fonda – double bass
- Barry Altschul – drums
