= Transforming the Space =

Studio album by FAB Trio
- Released: 2003
- Recorded: February 17–18, 2003
- Studio: The Spirit Room, Rossie, New York
- Genre: Free jazz
- Length: 1:03:36
- Label: CIMP; 284
- Producer: Bob Rusch

FAB Trio chronology
Transforming the Space (2003)	Live at Iron Works (2005)

Transforming the Space is the debut album by the FAB Trio, a collaborative ensemble named after the first letters of the musicians' last names, featuring double bassist Joe Fonda, drummer Barry Altschul, and violinist Billy Bang. It was recorded on February 17 and 18, 2003, at the Spirit Room in Rossie, New York, and was released later that year by CIMP.

== Reception ==
Professional ratings
Review scores
Source	Rating
AllMusic	4/5 stars
Tom Hull – on the Web	A−

In a review for AllMusic, Steve Loewy called the album "a delightful set," and noted the musicians' "collective virtuosity and joyous enthusiasm." He wrote: "It all has a certain sense of completeness, as though by the last selection the trio has accomplished its task with an unobtrusive reverence."

Derek Taylor of All About Jazz praised the music's "startling intellect and emotion," stating that the trio "generates a body of music on par with what the players' individual reputations would suggest." AAJ's Jeff Stockton described the recording as "a session brimming with empathic interplay," commenting: "the disc's sheer musicality and accessibility took me by surprise... The players were loose, and the result is as tight a trio session as you're likely to hear." Another AAJ writer remarked: "Without the particular combination of talent and experience each of these articulate players brings to this table, the risks involved would almost certainly have yielded total disaster. But somehow, magically, this hour of music ends up open, expansive, and hearty."

Dusted Magazine's Jason Bivins wrote: "The musicians prod each other, at times in a frenzy, but elsewhere in a serene manner. They embody virtues developed during an earlier period of American improvisation, when finely wrought compositions first grew from contexts of what had previously been complete freedom, and yet their playing still sounds vital."

Writing for Jazz Word, Ken Waxman noted Bang's "squirming, squeaking, near-atonal glissandos and multi-stops" that suggest "the picture of a whirling dervish fiddler," and praised the group's "memorable and thought-provoking sounds."

== Track listing ==
1. "Be Out S'cool" (Barry Altschul) – 7:52
2. "The Softness of Light" (Billy Bang) – 13:15
3. "For Papa Jo, Klook & Philly Too" (Barry Altschul) – 10:13
4. "Tales from Da Bronx" (Billy Bang) – 9:09
5. "Song for My Mother" (Joe Fonda) – 16:38
6. "Coligno Battatta" (Joe Fonda/Barry Altschul/Billy Bang) – 6:29

== Personnel ==
- Billy Bang – violin
- Joe Fonda – double bass
- Barry Altschul – drums
