= J. D. Parran =

American jazz musician

J. D. Parran is an American multi-woodwind player, educator, and composer specializing in jazz and free improvisation. He plays the soprano, alto, tenor, baritone, and bass saxophone, as well as the E-flat clarinet, alto clarinet, bass clarinet, contra-alto clarinet, piccolo, alto flute, bamboo flute, Native American flute, bamboo saxophone, and nagaswaram.

== Career ==
Parran spent his college years in St. Louis, Missouri, where he attended Webster University and received an M.A. in music education from Washington University in St. Louis. While a university student, he joined the Black Artists' Group with Hamiet Bluiett. He moved to New York City in 1971 and has served as chairman of the music department and the director of Jazz and African American Music Studies at The Harlem School of the Arts. He has taught at the City University of New York and Greenwich House Music School.

Parran has recorded with Stevie Wonder and John Lennon. For fifteen years he was a member of the experimental woodwind trio New Winds with Robert Dick and Ned Rothenberg, and is a member of Anthony Davis's Episteme ensemble. He also performs and records with Anthony Braxton's ensembles and has collaborated with Leroy Jenkins, Hamiet Bluiett, Douglas Ewart, John Lindberg, Peter Brötzmann, and the free improvisation group Company, which included Derek Bailey, Hugh Davies, Jamie Muir, Evan Parker, Vinko Globokar, and Joëlle Léandre.

== Discography ==
=== As leader ===
- J. D. Parran & Spirit Stage (Y'All of New York, 1997)
- Omegathorp: Living City (Y'All of New York, 2005)

=== As sideman ===
With Anthony Braxton

- 4 (Ensemble) Compositions 1992 (Black Saint, 1993)
- Creative Orchestra (Köln) 1978 (hatART, 1995)
- Tentet (New York) 1996 (Braxton House, 1996)
- Ensemble (New York) 1995 (Braxton House, 1997)
- Four Compositions (Washington, D.C.) 1998 (Braxton House, 1999)
- Ninetet (Yoshi's) 1997 Vol. 1 (Leo, 2002)
- Ninetet (Yoshi's) 1997 Vol. 2 (Leo, 2003)
- Ninetet (Yoshi's) 1997 Vol. 3 (Leo, 2005)
- Ninetet (Yoshi's) 1997 Vol. 4 (Leo, 2007)
- GTM (Knitting Factory) 1997 Vol. 2 New (Braxton House, 2011)
- Orchestra (Paris) 1978 (Braxton Bootleg, 2011)

With Thomas Buckner

- Full Spectrum Voice (Lovely Music, 1991)
- Inner Journey (Lovely Music, 1998)

With Don Byron

- Don Byron Plays the Music of Mickey Katz (Elektra Nonesuch, 1993)
- You Are #6: More Music for Six Musicians (Blue Note, 2001)
- Love, Peace, and Soul (Savoy, 2012)

With Company

- Company, 1983 (Honest Jons 2020)
- Company, Trios (Incus, 1986)

With Anthony Davis

- Variations in Dream-Time (India Navigation, 1982)
- Hemispheres (Gramavision, 1983)
- Return from Space (Wonder Nonfiction) (Gramavision, 1985)
- Undine (Gramavision, 1987)
- Tania (Koch, 2001)
- Notes from the Underground (BMOP/sound, 2014)

With Marty Ehrlich

- The Long View (Enja, 2002)
- A Trumpet in the Morning (New World, 2013)

With Julius Hemphill

- Julius Hemphill Big Band (Elektra Musician, 1988)
- One Atmosphere (Tzadik, 2003)

With others

- The Band, Rock of Ages (The Band in Concert) (Capitol, 1972)
- Hamiet Bluiett, The Clarinet Family (Black Saint, 1987)
- Peter Brötzmann, Berlin Djungle (FMP, 1987)
- Paul Butterfield, Better Days (Bearsville, 1973)
- Nels Cline, Lovers (Blue Note, 2016)
- Bill Dixon, 17 Musicians in Search of a Sound: Darfur (AUM Fidelity, 2008)
- Douglas Ewart, Angles of Entrance (Arawak, 1998)
- Marianne Faithfull, Easy Come Easy Go (Naive, 2008)
- Andrew Hill, A Beautiful Day (Palmetto, 2002)
- Human Arts Ensemble, Whisper of Dharma (Universal Justice, 1972)
- Jason Hwang, Unfolding Stone (Sound Aspects, 1990)
- Leroy Jenkins, Mixed Quintet (Black Saint, 1979)
- John Lennon & Yoko Ono, Double Fantasy (Geffen, 1980)
- George E. Lewis, Chicago Slow Dance (Lovely Music, 1981)
- John Lindberg, Trilogy of Works for Eleven Instrumentalists (Black Saint, 1985)
- Annea Lockwood, Thousand Year Dreaming (What Next?, 1993)
- Jackie Lomax, Three (Warner Bros., 1972)
- Ken Peplowski, Grenadilla (Concord Jazz, 1998)
- Lou Reed, Set the Twilight Reeling (Warner Bros., 1995)
- Marc Ribot, Requiem for What's His Name (Les Disques Du Crepuscule, 1992)
- Jason Robinson, Resonant Geographies (pfMENTUM, 2018)
- Jason Robinson, Tiresian Symmetry (Cuneiform, 2012)
- Alan Silva, Alan Silva & the Sound Visions Orchestra (Eremite, 2001)
- Alan Silva, H.Con.Res.57/Treasure Box (Eremite, 2003)
- Luther Thomas, Funky Donkey Vol. 1 (Creative Consciousness, 1977)
- Edward Vesala, Heavy Life (Leo, 1980)
- Stevie Wonder, Stevie Wonder's Original Musiquarium I (Tamla, 1982)
