= Ninetet (Yoshi's) 1997 Vol. 2 =

Live album by Anthony Braxton
- Released: 2002
- Recorded: August 20, 1997
- Venue: Yoshi's, Oakland, CA
- Genre: Jazz
- Length: 116:18
- Label: Leo; CD LR 382/383
- Producer: Anthony Braxton, Leo Feigin

Anthony Braxton chronology
Ninetet (Yoshi's) 1997 Vol. 1 (1997)	Ninetet (Yoshi's) 1997 Vol. 2 (2002)	Ninetet (Yoshi's) 1997 Vol. 3 (1997)

Ninetet (Yoshi's) 1997 Vol. 2 is a live album by composer and saxophonist Anthony Braxton with a ninetet, recorded at the Yoshi's in 1997 and released on the Leo label in 2003 as a double CD.

== Reception ==
Professional ratings
Review scores
Source	Rating
AllMusic	3/5 stars
The Penguin Guide to Jazz Recordings	4/4 stars

The AllMusic review by François Couture stated "Braxton's Ghost Trance Music series ranks among the most difficult music to review. Everyone has his or her personal favorites among the dozens of discs released under this umbrella and, since the general idea underpinning them all and the quality of musicianship remain rather constant, evaluation comes down to highly subjective factors. For instance, one listener might find the first volume in Leo Records' Ninetet (Yoshi's) 1997 series lacking in interest, but would be hard pressed to rationally explain why this second installment, Ninetet (Yoshi's) 1997, Vol. 2 is so much better. ... The music was recorded the day after the first volume, and consists once again of two disc-long pieces. The difference on Vol. 2 is that the group sounds more focused, more willing to trap the listener into the hypnotic patterns of the music and push him to the edge of free improvisation. "Composition N. 210" in particular deploys some mean tricks to make you forget that it is written down. The two pieces develop very different colors. Most noticeable is the fact that Norton (mostly) plays the drum kit in "N. 210," while he sticks to mallet percussion and cymbals in "N. 209." And so, either by design or attraction, "N. 210" displays a certain free jazz mood, prone to a certain frenzy, while "N. 209" slightly evokes contemporary classical music, especially in its delicate finale. Up to this point, the listener may be under the impression that GTM worked better with small groupings, but this set proves otherwise".

== Track listing ==
All compositions by Anthony Braxton

Disc one

1. "Composition N. 209" – 57:49

Disc two

1. "Composition N. 210" – 58:33

== Personnel ==
- Anthony Braxton – E♭ alto saxophone, F alto saxophone, soprano saxophone, C melody saxophone, flute, B♭ clarinet, bass clarinet, contrabass clarinet
- Brandon Evans – tenor saxophone, C soprano saxophone, sopranino saxophone, bass clarinet, flute
- James Fei – soprano saxophone, alto saxophone, bass clarinet
- Jackson Moore – alto saxophone, B♭ clarinet
- André Vida – tenor saxophone, alto saxophone, soprano saxophone, baritone saxophone
- J. D. Parran – soprano saxophone, bass saxophone, flute
- Kevin O'Neil – electric guitar
- Joe Fonda – bass
- Kevin Norton – drums, marimba, percussion
