= Ninetet (Yoshi's) 1997 Vol. 3 =

Live album by Anthony Braxton
- Released: 2005
- Recorded: August 21, 1997
- Venue: Yoshi's, Oakland, CA
- Genre: Jazz
- Length: 111:01
- Label: Leo; CD LR 420/421
- Producer: Anthony Braxton, Leo Feigin

Anthony Braxton chronology
Ninetet (Yoshi's) 1997 Vol. 2 (1997)	Ninetet (Yoshi's) 1997 Vol. 3 (2005)	Ninetet (Yoshi's) 1997 Vol. 4 (1997)

Ninetet (Yoshi's) 1997 Vol. 3 is a live album by composer and saxophonist Anthony Braxton with a ninetet, recorded at the Yoshi's in 1997 and released on the Leo label in 2005 as a double CD.

== Reception ==
Professional ratings
Review scores
Source	Rating
AllMusic	4/5 stars
The Penguin Guide to Jazz Recordings	4/4 stars

The Allmusic review by François Couture stated "Because of the range of arrangements it offers in a format relatively easy to keep together, the Ninetet is turning into Braxton's ultimate Ghost Trance Music-era group, in the light of these recordings. The (shifting) triple-trio configuration, the quality of the musicianship, and the creativity developed from "Composition No. 207" through "Composition No. 218" will make this series one of the essential documents of GTM. As on the previous night, the most immediate difference between the first and the second pieces is Kevin Norton's role. In "211," he sticks exclusively to marimba and vibraphone, while in "212" he is mostly behind the drum kit. The first piece is the strongest one of the two".

== Track listing ==
All compositions by Anthony Braxton

Disc one

1. "Composition N. 211" – 55:30

Disc two

1. "Composition N. 212" – 55:35

== Personnel ==
- Anthony Braxton – E♭ alto saxophone, F alto saxophone, soprano saxophone, C melody saxophone, flute, B♭ clarinet, bass clarinet, contrabass clarinet
- Brandon Evans – tenor saxophone, C soprano saxophone, sopranino saxophone, bass clarinet, flute
- James Fei – soprano saxophone, alto saxophone, bass clarinet
- Jackson Moore – alto saxophone, B♭ clarinet
- André Vida – tenor saxophone, alto saxophone, soprano saxophone, baritone saxophone
- J. D. Parran – soprano saxophone, bass saxophone, flute
- Kevin O'Neil – electric guitar
- Joe Fonda – bass
- Kevin Norton – drums, marimba, percussion
