= Solo (Skopje) 1995 =

Live album by Anthony Braxton
- Released: 1997
- Recorded: October 18, 1995
- Venue: Skopje Jazz Festival, Skopje, Republic of Macedonia
- Genre: Jazz
- Length: 71:52
- Label: Braxton House; BH 002
- Producer: Anthony Braxton, Velibor Pedevski

Anthony Braxton chronology
Sextet (Istanbul) 1996 (1995)	Solo (Skopje) 1995 (1997)	Six Standards (Quintet) 1996 (1995)

Solo (Skopje) 1995 is a live solo album by composer and saxophonist Anthony Braxton recorded at the Skopje Jazz Festival in 1995 and released on his own Braxton House label.

== Track listing ==
All compositions by Anthony Braxton except where noted

1. "Composition No. 191a" – 16:56
2. "Composition No. 191b" – 8:53
3. "Composition No. 191c" – 6:39
4. "Easy Living" (Ralph Rainger, Leo Robin) – 10:12
5. "Composition No. 191d" – 8:47
6. "Composition No. 191e" – 6:00
7. "Composition No. 191f" – 9:22
8. "East of the Sun (and West of the Moon)" (Brooks Bowman) – 5:03

== Personnel ==
- Anthony Braxton – alto saxophone
