= Ninetet (Yoshi's) 1997 Vol. 1 =

Live album by Anthony Braxton
- Released: 2002
- Recorded: August 19, 1997
- Venues: Yoshi's, Oakland, California, U.S.
- Genre: Jazz
- Length: 143:09
- Labels: Leo; CD LR 343/344
- Producers: Anthony Braxton, Leo Feigin

Anthony Braxton chronology
Quintet (Tristano) 1997 (1997)	Ninetet (Yoshi's) 1997 Vol. 1 (2002)	Ninetet (Yoshi's) 1997 Vol. 2 (1997)

Ninetet (Yoshi's) 1997 Vol. 1 is a live album by composer and saxophonist Anthony Braxton with a ninetet, recorded at Yoshi's in 1997 and released on the Leo label in 2002 as a double CD.

== Reception ==
Professional ratings
Review scores
Source	Rating
AllMusic	3/5 stars
The Penguin Guide to Jazz Recordings	4/4 stars

The Allmusic review by Steve Loewy stated "this two-CD set captures Anthony Braxton's "Ghost Trance" music performed by a sympathetic nonet, consisting of a saxophone sextet plus a rhythm section. Each of the group's members is closely associated with Braxton, so that this performance can be said to accurately portray the structure of the music and the intentions of the composer. The sound is surprisingly clear for a live performance, too. This is very difficult music to listen to at one sitting, and the written saxophone parts can be particularly torturous. Pounding pulses devoid of melody, a somewhat limited tonal palette, and lots of repeating phrases (what the composer calls "repetition") add to the complexity and the opaqueness. ... the solos and trio breakouts are nothing less than splendid. For those who have been exposed to this phase of Braxton's music, these two performances are among his best for a small group. For those who have not yet tasted these fruits, you may wish to start elsewhere with a single helping".

== Track listing ==
All compositions by Anthony Braxton

Disc one

1. "Composition N. 207" – 72:00

Disc two

1. "Composition N. 208" – 71:09

== Personnel ==
- Anthony Braxton – E♭ alto saxophone, F alto saxophone, soprano saxophone, C melody saxophone, flute, B♭ clarinet, bass clarinet, contrabass clarinet
- Brandon Evans – tenor saxophone, C soprano saxophone, sopranino saxophone, bass clarinet, flute
- James Fei – soprano saxophone, alto saxophone, bass clarinet
- Jackson Moore – alto saxophone, B♭ clarinet
- André Vida – tenor saxophone, alto saxophone, soprano saxophone, baritone saxophone
- J. D. Parran – soprano saxophone, bass saxophone, flute
- Kevin O'Neil – electric guitar
- Joe Fonda – bass
- Kevin Norton – drums, marimba, percussion
