= With Grace in Mind =

Studio album by Dreamstruck (Marilyn Crispell, Joe Fonda, and Harvey Sorgen)
- Released: 2022
- Recorded: June 26, 2021
- Studio: Area 52 Studios, Saugerties, New York
- Genre: Free improvisation
- Length: 48:23
- Label: Fundacja Sluchaj! FSR 12 2022

With Grace in Mind is an album by the jazz trio Dreamstruck, featuring pianist Marilyn Crispell, double bassist Joe Fonda, and drummer Harvey Sorgen. It was recorded on June 26, 2021, at Area 52 Studios in Saugerties, New York, and was released in 2022 by Fundacja Sluchaj!, a Polish label.

The album is a follow-up to the trio's 2018 release, Dreamstruck (Not Two Records).

== Reception ==
Professional ratings
Review scores
Source	Rating
All About Jazz	4/5 stars

In a review for All About Jazz, Mike Jurkovic called the album "an unprecedented recording," and wrote: "without interference from the shiny things that distract us—war, social media, cable news, celebrity turmoil—With Grace in Mind resolves its moods not with platitudes but with firm, conscious commitments... A truly unique performance. A truly unique listen." AAJ's Maurice Hogue described the album as "one of the memorable piano trio releases of 2022," featuring musicians who are "among the finest at their craft," creating "original music from original ideas."

Bruce Lee Gallanter of Downtown Music Gallery stated: "There is something magical, free-flowing and organic going on here. Uplifting and inspiring is how this music makes me feel."

The editors of The New York City Jazz Record included the recording in their "Best of 2022 / Albums of the Year" feature. Writer Ken Waxman commented: "Crispell's writing... always contains an element of rushing pressure and active intensity, even when she's engaged in slow, quiet story-telling... This well-balanced trio matches the 'grace' in its album title with gravity and grit."

A writer for JazzWord singled out Fonda's "GS#2" for praise, writing: "Zesty and intense it features the pianist pushing the flows and eddies in her playing into a responsive and reflective theme statement. Furious but not frenetic, it's sympathetically seconded by drum rim shots and side taps and sluicing and popping bass work."

== Track listing ==
1. "A Moment in the Shade" (Harvey Sorgen, Joe Fonda, Marilyn Crispell) – 1:12
2. "For Ornette" (Joe Fonda) – 4:39
3. "MGJ" (Joe Fonda) – 3:17
4. "We All Make Mistakes" (Joe Fonda) – 7:26
5. "Drums" (Harvey Sorgen) – 2:56
6. "With Grace in Mind" (Harvey Sorgen, Joe Fonda, Marilyn Crispell) – 2:38
7. "Transits" (Marilyn Crispell) – 6:31
8. "Midnight" (Marilyn Crispell) – 4:23
9. "GS#2" (Joe Fonda) – 7:44
10. "Speak Up" (Harvey Sorgen, Joe Fonda, Marilyn Crispell) – 2:50
11. "Gary's Tune" (Marilyn Crispell) – 4:48

== Personnel ==
- Marilyn Crispell – piano
- Joe Fonda – double bass
- Harvey Sorgen – drums
