= Dreamstruck =

Studio album by Harvey Sorgen, Joe Fonda, and Marilyn Crispell
- Released: 2018
- Recorded: January–March 2018
- Studio: Area 52 Studio, Saugerties, New York
- Genre: Free jazz
- Label: Not Two Records; MW977-2

Dreamstruck is an album by drummer Harvey Sorgen, bassist Joe Fonda, and pianist Marilyn Crispell. It was recorded at Area 52 Studio in Saugerties, New York in January through March 2018, and was released later that year by Not Two Records.

In 2022, the trio released a follow-up album titled With Grace in Mind (Fundacja Sluchaj!).

== Reception ==
Professional ratings
Review scores
Source	Rating
All About Jazz	4/5 stars

In a review for Jazz Times, Shaun Brady called the album "a vivid example of [Crispell's] lyrical volatility and exquisite control on a largely free session."

Simon Adams, writing for Jazz Journal, praised "the close listening each player maintains to the contributions of others," and noted that "there is a confidence and honesty about them that convinces."

All About Jazz reviewer Dan McClenaghan stated: "Dreamstruck is a wonder of in-the-moment-ness. It is forthright and in-your-face...; ghostly and dreamscape-like...; full of uncentered melodic beauty...; thorny, teetering along the edge...; and gorgeously minimalist and majestic... And in the piano trio game, they sound like no other out there... Austere for the most part, the music benefits from a ruminative patience of delivery and the fortuitous entanglement of three strong musical personalities."

In an article for Point of Departure, Greg Buium commented: "Here, three improvisers deep into middle age show how control and consonance and a deep, internal sense of form can make impromptu logic terrifically beautiful... Dreamstruck is a warm, often extremely accessible record. There is a searing, single-minded intensity at its core."

== Track listing ==
"Dreamstruck" composed by Bob Windbiel. "Kalypso" composed by Paul Motian. Remaining tracks by Gary Peacock, Marilyn Crispell, and Harvey Sorgen.

1. "My Song" – 6:18
2. "Portrait" – 5:24
3. "Landscape" – 3:23
4. "Our Own Tea Leaves" – 3:53
5. "Dreamstruck" – 5:36
6. "Read This" – 7:47
7. "Area 52" – 5:31
8. "Both Sides of the Ocean" – 6:07
9. "On Bellagio" – 6:59
10. "Kalypso" – 5:21

== Personnel ==
- Marilyn Crispell – piano
- Joe Fonda – bass
- Harvey Sorgen – drums
