= Ninetet (Yoshi's) 1997 Vol. 4 =

Live album by Anthony Braxton
- Released: 2002
- Recorded: August 22, 1997
- Venue: Yoshi's, Oakland, CA
- Genre: Jazz
- Length: 114:50
- Label: Leo; CD LR 500/501
- Producer: Anthony Braxton, Leo Feigin

Anthony Braxton chronology
Ninetet (Yoshi's) 1997 Vol. 3 (1997)	Ninetet (Yoshi's) 1997 Vol. 4 (2002)	Sax Quintet (NY) 1998 (1998)

Ninetet (Yoshi's) 1997 Vol. 4 is a live album by composer and saxophonist Anthony Braxton with a ninetet, recorded at the Yoshi's in 1997 and released on the Leo label in 2007 as a double CD.

== Reception ==
Professional ratings
Review scores
Source	Rating
AllMusic	3.5/5 stars
All About Jazz	4.5/5 stars

The Allmusic review by arwulf arwulf stated "When in August 1997 the Anthony Braxton Ninetet performed live at Yoshi's in Oakland, California, the methodology he called Ghost Trance Music still contained elements of its "first species" stage, in which the primary rhythmic pulse was generated in honor of the First Nation Native American drum ritual tradition. Although by this time Braxton's Ghost Trance Music had been evolving for little more than two years, greater systematic variability is evident throughout the intricate and complex "Composition N. 213" and "Composition N. 214," which may reflect GTM's other primal influence, the Indonesian Shadow Puppet Theater tradition. ... This is the Braxton Ninetet's fourth and final recording made during that five-day engagement at Yoshi's in 1997". On All About Jazz, John Eyles noted "As this release is the fourth volume of the Yoshi's recordings, it seems unlikely to attract listeners who have not already heard the previous volumes. The scored music is entirely consistent with those preceding releases; highly structured and rhythmically tight, it gets into a groove and then stays there for a long time. There are solos on top of the repeated patterns that define each composition, but that is where they are—on top".

== Track listing ==
All compositions by Anthony Braxton

Disc one

1. "Composition N. 213" – 56:14

Disc two

1. "Composition N. 214" – 58:40

== Personnel ==
- Anthony Braxton – E♭ alto saxophone, F alto saxophone, soprano saxophone, C melody saxophone, flute, B♭ clarinet, bass clarinet, contrabass clarinet
- Brandon Evans – tenor saxophone, C soprano saxophone, sopranino saxophone, bass clarinet, flute
- James Fei – soprano saxophone, alto saxophone, bass clarinet
- Jackson Moore – alto saxophone, B♭ clarinet
- André Vida – tenor saxophone, alto saxophone, soprano saxophone, baritone saxophone
- J. D. Parran – soprano saxophone, bass saxophone, flute
- Kevin O'Neil – electric guitar
- Joe Fonda – bass
- Kevin Norton – drums, marimba, percussion
