= Twelve Compositions =

Live album by Anthony Braxton Quartet
- Released: 1994
- Recorded: July 13–14 & 16, 1993
- Venues: Yoshi's, Oakland, CA
- Genre: Jazz
- Length: 156:41
- Labels: Music & Arts; CD-835
- Producer: Anthony Braxton

Anthony Braxton chronology
Duo (London) 1993 (1993)	Twelve Compositions (1994)	Quartet (Santa Cruz) 1993 (1993)

Twelve Compositions (subtitled Recorded Live in July 1993 at Yoshi's in Oakland California) is a double CD live album by American saxophonist and composer Anthony Braxton, recorded at Yoshi's in 1993 and released on the Music & Arts label.

== Reception ==
Professional ratings
Review scores
Source	Rating
Allmusic	4/5 stars
Allmusic	4.5/5 stars
The Penguin Guide to Jazz Recordings	3.5/4 stars

The Allmusic review by Scott Yanow stated "Not only do the musicians tackle a dozen of Braxton's complicated originals, but during part of four of them, individual members are assigned the task of playing a different composition than the rest of the group. Obviously this is not music to be taken lightly or merely played in the background. However, listeners with the time and interest will find much to enjoy in the very lively explorations from these masterful musicians". Another by Thom Jurek said "In all, this double-disc set shows how wide-ranging the Braxton Quartet could be, and how these stellar musicians transformed avant-garde ensemble playing in America, if not the world over".

== Track listing ==
All compositions by Anthony Braxton.

1. "Composition No. 48" - 13:26
2. "Composition No. 23M (+108C)" - 14:35
3. "Composition No. 32" - 5:45
4. "Composition No. 66 (+135)" - 10:06
5. "Composition No. 160" - 10:52
6. "Composition No. 158" - 6:15
7. "Composition No. 140" - 14:32
8. "Composition No. 69J (+30+108D)" - 14:05
9. "Composition No. 20 + 86" - 10:11
10. "Composition No. 171" - 19:20
11. Composition No. 23C" - 7:47
12. "Composition No. 105B" - 9:53
- Recorded July 13, 1993 (track 7), July, 14, 1993 (tracks 1–6) and July 16, 1993 (tracks 8–12) at Yoshi's Keystone Korner in Oakland, California.

== Personnel ==
- Anthony Braxton – alto saxophone, sopranino saxophone, clarinet, bass clarinet
- Marilyn Crispell - piano
- Mark Dresser - bass
- Gerry Hemingway - drums, percussion, vibraphone, marimba
