= Roland Dahinden =

Swiss trombonist and composer

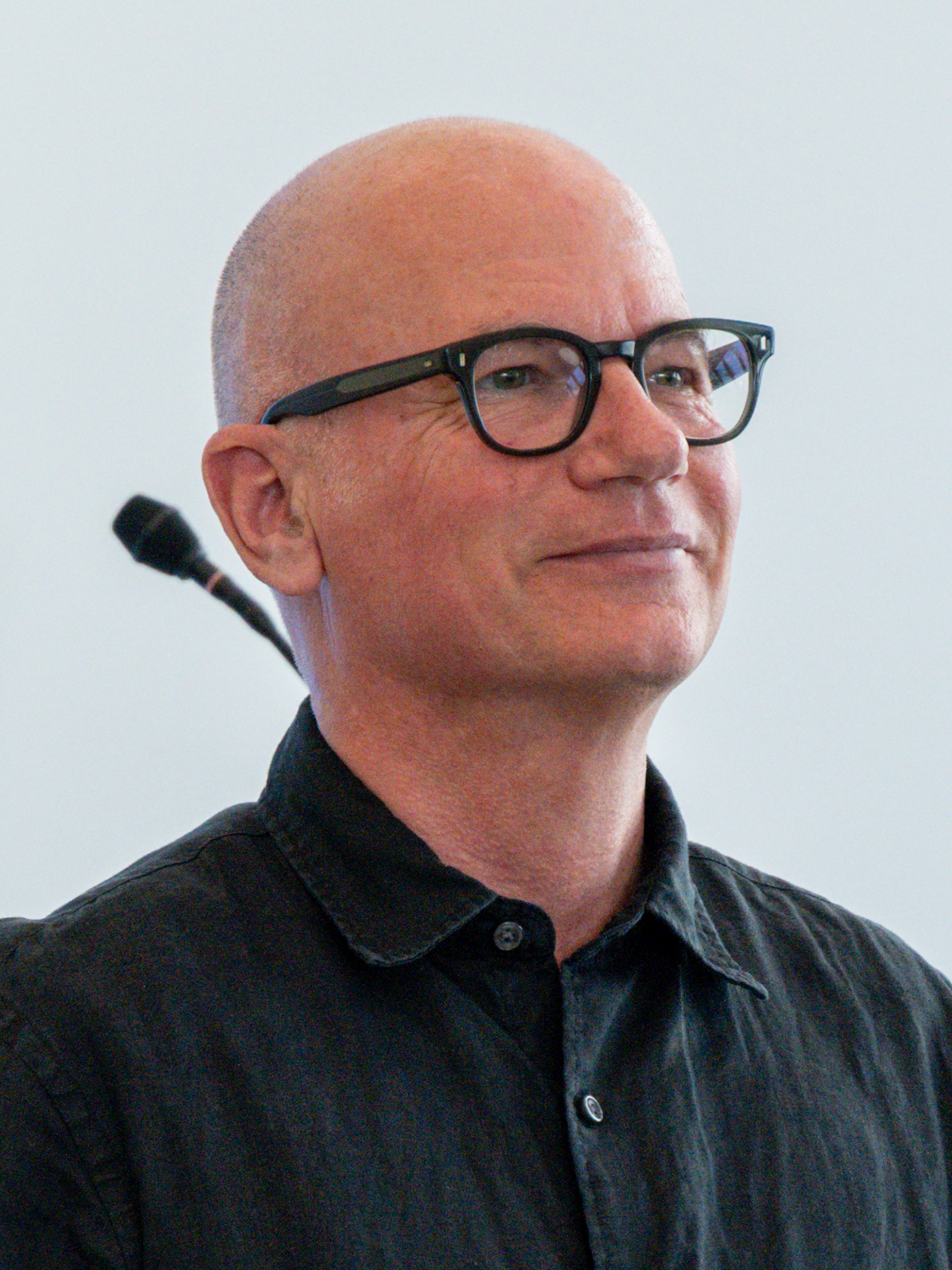
Roland Dahinden in 2026

Roland Dahinden (born 2 May 1962) is a Swiss trombonist and composer.

== Career ==
He was born in Zug, Switzerland. He studied the trombone and composition at Musikhochschule Graz with Erich Kleinschuster and Georg Friedrich Haas, at Scuola di Musica di Fiesole Florenz with Vinko Globokar). He earned an MA at Wesleyan University in Connecticut (1994), studying with Anthony Braxton, Alvin Lucier and a PhD at Birmingham University, England (2002), studying with Vic Hoyland. In 2003, he was awarded the "werkjahr" prize of the art council of the Canton of Zug, Switzerland.

He is married to the pianist Hildegard Kleeb, whom he has worked with as a duo since 1987. Since 1992 he has worked as a trio with violinist Dimitrios Polisoidis.

As a trombonist he specializes in the performance of contemporary music and improvisation/jazz. He has given concerts throughout Europe, America and Asia. Composers such as Peter Ablinger, Maria de Alvear, Anthony Braxton, John Cage, Peter Hansen, Hauke Harder, Bernhard Lang, Joelle Léandre, Alvin Lucier, Chris Newman, Pauline Oliveros, Hans Otte, Lars Sandberg, Wolfgang von Schweinitz, Daniel Wolf and Christian Wolff have written especially for him. In 2005, the CD Silberen was picked as one of the 'Top Classical Albums of the Year 2004' by The New Yorker.

As a composer he collaborated with visual artists Guido Baselgia, Andreas Brandt, Stéphane Brunner, Daniel Buren, Rudolf de Crignis, Philippe Deléglise, Inge Dick, Rainer Grodnick, Sol LeWitt, Lisa Schiess, with the architects Morger & Degelo, and with the author Eugen Gomringer.

His exhibitions with sound installation and sculptors are shown in Europe and America.

== Discography ==
- Trombone Performance (Amadeo, 1989, with Christian Muthspiel)
- John Cage, Prelude for Meditation (HatART, 1993, with Kleeb)
- Christian Wolff, For Ruth Crawford (HatART, 1994, with Kleeb and Polisoidis)
- Anthony Braxton, Small Ensemble Music (Wesleyan) 1994 (Splasc(H), 1994 [1999]); Sextet (Istanbul) 1996 (Braxton House, 1995 [1996]); Octet (New York) 1995 (Braxton House, 1995 [1997]); Tentet (New York) 1996 (Braxton House, 1996)
- Christian Wolff, Exercises (HatART, 1995, with Eberhard Blum, Steffen Schleiermacher, and Jan Williams)
- Peter Ablinger, Momente Neuer Musik (Werke 89-91) (Grazer Etikett, Klangschitte, 1996, with Polisoidis)
- Alvin Lucier, Panorama (Lovely Music, Ltd., 1997, with Kleeb)
- Silberen (Mode Records, 2004)
- Flying White (Mode, 2006)
- Recall Pollock (Leo Records, 2006, with Kleeb)
