= Composition No. 174 =

Live album by Anthony Braxton
- Released: December 1994
- Recorded: February 6, 1994
- Venue: Music Theatre at the Arizona State University of Music, Tempe, AZ
- Genre: Jazz
- Length: 44:55
- Label: Leo; CD LR 217
- Producer: Leo Feigin

Anthony Braxton chronology
Duo (Leipzig) 1993 (1993)	Composition No. 174 (1994)	Duo (Wesleyan) 1994 (1994)

Composition No. 174 (subtitled For Ten Percussionists, Slide Projections, Constructed Environment And Tape) is a live album by composer and conductor Anthony Braxton with the Arizona State University Percussion Ensemble recorded in Arizona in 1994 and released on the Leo label.

== Reception ==
Professional ratings
Review scores
Source	Rating
Allmusic	1.5/5 stars

The Allmusic review by Thom Jurek stated "Without a doubt, this is Anthony Braxton at his most abstract. ... This work, though conceived by one of the most truly brilliant men of the 20th century, Composition No. 174 is proof that human beings are fallible. It may be art, but that doesn't make it enjoyable; it's duller than radio static".

== Track listing ==
All compositions by Anthony Braxton.

1. "Composition No. 174" – 44:55

== Personnel ==
- Arizona State University Percussion Ensemble directed by Dr. J. B. Smith
  - Sonja Branch, Kevin Fuhrman, Justin Jackson, Glen Ormiston, Arnoldo Ruiz, Steve Ridley, Mark Timko, Steve Turner, Paul Welter, Scott Werner – percussion
