= Duo (Wesleyan) 1994 =

Live album by Anthony Braxton and Abraham Adzinyah
- Released: December 1995
- Recorded: April 23, 1994
- Venue: Crowell Concert Hall, Wesleyan University, Middletown, CT
- Genre: Jazz
- Length: 101:00
- Label: Leo; CD LR 228/229
- Producer: Leo Feigin

Anthony Braxton chronology
Composition No. 174 (1994)	Duo (Wesleyan) 1994 (1995)	Duet: Live at Merkin Hall (1994)

Duo (Wesleyan) 1994 is a live album by composer and saxophonist Anthony Braxton with percussionist Abraham Adzinyah recorded at Wesleyan University in 1994 and released on the Leo label.

== Reception ==
Professional ratings
Review scores
Source	Rating
Allmusic	4.5/5 stars

The Allmusic review by Chris Kelsey stated "Braxton is never better than when he allows himself the most freedom. Here, though he is reined in a bit by the regular beat of Adzinyah's Middle-Eastern drumming, the saxophonist is relatively unencumbered by formal concerns; this is the best possible framework in which to hear Braxton's improvising. ... In contexts like this, Braxton is the most focused and intense of improvisors. It's evident, when listening to him play what is essentially "free" music, how little he really needs in the way of external organization. ... This set is a prime example of how transcendent an artist he can be, when left to his own devices".

== Track listing ==
All compositions by Anthony Braxton and Abraham Adzinyah.

Disc one

1. "Untitled" – 51:12

Disc two

1. "Untitled" – 49:48

== Personnel ==
- Anthony Braxton – reeds
- Abraham Adzinyah – percussion
