= Octet (New York) 1995 =

Ensemble (New York) 1995

Live album by Anthony Braxton
- Released: 1997
- Recorded: November 24, 1995
- Venue: Tri-Centric (Thanksgiving) Festival, Knitting Factory, NYC
- Genre: Jazz
- Length: 49:36
- Label: Braxton House; BH 006
- Producer: Anthony Braxton, Velibor Pedevski

Anthony Braxton chronology
Six Standards (Quintet) 1996 (1995)	Ensemble (New York) 1995 (1997)	Ensemble (New York) 1995 (1995)

Octet (New York) 1995 is a live album by composer and saxophonist Anthony Braxton with an octet, recorded at the Knitting Factory in 1995 and released on his own Braxton House label.

== Reception ==
Professional ratings
Review scores
Source	Rating
Allmusic	3/5 stars

The Allmusic review by Thom Jurek stated "This octet documentation of Anthony Braxton's "Composition 188" is solid evidence of the state of the decline of the recording industry's ability to nurture an artist—even one of Braxton's stature—and see to much less beyond the bottom line in order to fulfill their function as documenters of cultural history. ... A label would have allowed Braxton to hire—rather than ask their favor—a group of handpicked musicians for this particular work and have given them the money and the time to rehearse it adequately before recording it. That used to happen".

== Track listing ==
1. "Composition No. 188" (Anthony Braxton) – 58:05

== Personnel ==
- Anthony Braxton – E♭ sopranino saxophone, E♭ alto saxophone, flute, E♭ sopranino clarinet, B♭ clarinet, contrabass clarinet, F saxophone
- Roland Dahinden – trombone, alto trombone
- André Vida – baritone saxophone, alto saxophone, B♭ soprano saxophone, tenor saxophone, Hungarian shepherd flute
- Brandon Evans – C soprano saxophone, tenor saxophone, bass clarinet, flute, wooden flute
- Jason Kao Hwang – electric violin
- Ted Reichman – accordion
- Joe Fonda – bass
- Kevin Norton – drums, vibraphone, glockenspiel, percussion
