= Duo (Leipzig) 1993 =

Live album by Anthony Braxton and Ted Reichman
- Released: 1995
- Recorded: December 8, 1993
- Venues: Gewandhaus, Leipzig, Germany
- Genre: Jazz
- Length: 66:06
- Labels: Music & Arts; CD 848

Anthony Braxton chronology
Anthony Braxton's Charlie Parker Project 1993 (1993)	Duo (Leipzig) 1993 (1995)	Composition No. 174 (1994)

Duo (Leipzig) 1993 is an album by American saxophonist and composer Anthony Braxton with accordionist/pianist Ted Reichman recorded in 1993 for the Music & Arts label.

== Reception ==
Professional ratings
Review scores
Source	Rating
Allmusic	2.5/5 stars
The Penguin Guide to Jazz Recordings	2.5/4 stars

The Allmusic review by Thom Jurek stated "the pairing just doesn't work. The reason is a simple one: Reichman is too in awe of his professor to give him a run for his money, though he is sufficiently gifted enough to perhaps do just that. He stilts himself, which in turn, stilts Braxton (or worse, doesn't). When the professor is working from a full head of steam, Reichman lays back when he should be driving in, running through Braxton's skittering skein of notes, with cascading tonal clusters of his own. But he holds himself in check, which after 20 or 30 minutes becomes frustrating – especially when you can hear how gifted Reichman is as a soloist and as a potential foil".

== Track listing ==
All compositions by Anthony Braxton.

1. "No. 101" – 20:58
2. "No. 168" – 11:06
3. "No. 167" – 12:38
4. "No. 136" – 14:26
5. "No. 86" – 6:58

== Personnel ==
- Anthony Braxton – alto saxophone, flute
- Ted Reichman – accordion, piano
