= Trio (London) 1993 =

Live album by Anthony Braxton, Evan Parker, Paul Rutherford
- Released: 1994
- Recorded: May 22, 1993
- Venue: London Jazz Festival, Bloomsbury Theatre, Camden, England
- Genre: Jazz
- Length: 53:33
- Label: Leo; CD LR 197
- Producer: Leo Feigin

Anthony Braxton chronology
| 4 (Ensemble) Compositions 1992 (1993) | Trio (London) 1993 (1994) | Duo (London) 1993 (1993) |

Trio (London) 1993 is a live album featuring performances by saxophonists Anthony Braxton and Evan Parker and trombonist Paul Rutherford which was recorded at the Bloomsbury Theatre as part of the 1993 London Jazz Festival and released on the Leo label.

== Reception ==
Professional ratings
Review scores
| Source | Rating |
|---|---|
| Allmusic | 4/5 stars |
| The Penguin Guide to Jazz Recordings | 4/4 stars |

The Allmusic review by Scott Yanow stated "The unusual trio perform five adventurous group improvisations that are surprisingly concise and largely self-sufficient despite the lack of any rhythm instruments. Still, this is not a release for the beginner and it is most highly recommended to collectors already quite familiar with Anthony Braxton's explorative musics".

== Track listing ==
All compositions by Anthony Braxton, Evan Parker and Paul Rutherford.

1. "The Honker" – 18:04
2. "Arkanther" – 10:37
3. "Axtarkrut" – 8:23
4. "Vanuthrax" – 9:49
5. "The Breaker" – 6:38

== Personnel ==
- Anthony Braxton – alto saxophone, sopranino saxophone
- Evan Parker – tenor saxophone, soprano saxophone
- Paul Rutherford – trombone
