= Tentet (New York) 1996 =

Live album by Anthony Braxton
- Released: 1996
- Recorded: June 23, 1996
- Venue: What is Jazz? Festival, Knitting Factory, NYC
- Genre: Jazz
- Length: 67:11
- Label: Braxton House; BH 004
- Producer: Anthony Braxton, Velibor Pedevski

Anthony Braxton chronology
Composition 192 (1996)	Tentet (New York) 1996 (1996)	Trillium R (1996)

Tentet (New York) 1996 is a live album by composer and saxophonist Anthony Braxton with an ensemble, recorded at the Knitting Factory in 1996 and released on his own Braxton House label.

== Reception ==
Professional ratings
Review scores
Source	Rating
AllMusic	4/5 stars

The Allmusic review by Thom Jurek stated "this premier recording of Anthony Braxton's "Composition No. 193" for tentet is a work of remarkable elasticity and texture. ... Braxton shoves classical idealism and jazz bravado right into the middle of one another in a visionary meld. ... Ultimately, as with most of Braxton's work, conventional musical idioms are a waste of descriptive or critical language. It doesn't swing, but it does flow, float, and shine; this work does not make one stomp one's feet, but it does engage on an emotional as well as intellectual level. Above all, it accomplishes what the composer set out to do: create an enormous palette of colors and textures, explore them thematically using conventional and expanded harmonic syntax, and develop new possibilities for structural integration and open improvisation between the worlds of 20th century classical music and the jazz vernacular".

== Track listing ==
1. "Composition No. 193" (Anthony Braxton) – 67:11

== Personnel ==
- Anthony Braxton – flute, E♭ clarinet, B♭ clarinet, contrabass clarinet, sopranino saxophone, F saxophone
- J. D. Parran – alto clarinet, piccolo
- Brandon Evans – C soprano saxophone, alto saxophone, tenor saxophone, bass clarinet, flute
- André Vida – B♭ soprano saxophone, alto saxophone, tenor saxophone, baritone saxophone
- Roland Dahinden – trombone, alto trombone
- Jacqui Carrasco, Gwen Laster – violin
- Ted Reichman – accordion
- Joe Fonda – bass
- Kevin Norton – drums, vibraphone, glockenspiel, percussion
