= Ben Opie =

Ben Opie (born 1981) is a classically trained oboist and artistic director from Victoria, Australia.

== Early life and education ==
Opie was born in Victoria, Australia. He holds degrees from the Australian National University, and the Johannes Gutenberg Hochschule für Musik in Germany. With colleagues from the ANU, Opie formed the Windswept Wind Quintet, which performed on national ABC radio, as well as in master classes, competitions and organised regional tours of South Australia.

Opie earned a Master of Music degree at the San Francisco Conservatory of Music in 2009. He studied with performance teachers Susan Harvey, Geoffrey Lancaster and Genevieve Lacey.

== Career ==
Opie has performed with a number ensembles, including Ensemble Parallelle, Blue Print New Music Ensemble, Magik*Magik Orchestra and Ensemble Resonanz. as well as performers such as Rosalind Halton, Alice Evans, Corey Jamason, and Brett Weymark.

Opie has performed in Germany, France, Bahrain, US and Australia as a soloist, ensemble and orchestral musician.

Opie has performed with a number of Australia's orchestras, including taking on the role of acting associate principal oboe with the Melbourne Symphony Orchestra.

Opie was acting principal oboe of the Adelaide Symphony Orchestra in 2009 and again in 2012. He was the principal oboe of the Sydney Chamber Opera in 2011. In 2012 Opie was principal oboe with the Opera Australia Oz Opera touring orchestra. He was acting associate principal oboe of the West Australian Symphony Orchestra in 2012 and 2013.

Opie was presented with the Phyllis C Wattis Foundation Scholarship, the San Francisco Conservatory of Music award for new music, the 42nd International Summer Course for New Music Scholarship, Darmstadt, the Carmel Music Competition Finalist and the Inaugural Double Reed Challenge, section Oboe winner.

In 2015, Opie was a guest on ABC Classic FM's Keys to Music with Graham Abbott, where he both performed and discussed the oboe in detail.

In 2017 it was announced that Ben would be the Artistic Director of the Peninsula Summer Music Festival on Melbourne's Mornington Peninsula from 2019. His first festival presented a record number of events, and added new strands of kids and community programming.

== Performances ==
In 2000, Opie performed at the Barossa Music Festival in collaboration with Sir Peter Maxwell Davies’ residency. In 2002, he participated in a World Orchestra formed in conjunction with the Salt Lake City Winter Olympic Games, performing both as principal oboist and as a soloist.

In 2004, Opie performed at the 2004 Darmstadt International Summer Course for New Music in Germany, working with Ensemble Resonanz, Jennifer Dill and Peter Veale, among others. He later played principal oboe with the RIAS Jugendorchester, performing at the opening of the Berlin Hauptbahnhof, the 2006 Museumsinsel Festival in Berlin and the acclaimed Kammeroper Schloss Rheinsberg Festival. In 2005 and 2006, Opie performed several times in the Middle East with the Manama Singers as part of the Bahrain Music Festival in Manama, Kingdom of Bahrain.

While undertaking his master's degree in San Francisco, Opie was involved with Nicole Paiement’s Ensemble Parallele and Blueprint Music Ensemble, which perform mainly new music, including that of composers Luciano Chessa, David Garner and Dan Becker. For his work with the Blue Print Ensemble, the San Francisco Conservatory honoured Opie with the New Music Ensemble Award in 2009.

In San Francisco, Opie was principal oboe with Minna Choi’s Magik*Magik Orchestra, which combines the music of independent rock musicians and classical artists. The Magik*Magik Orchestra acts as the studio orchestra of John Vanderslice's Tiny Telephone Studios.

He worked with award winning poet, Cecilia White on their “Breathing Space” performance series, exploring the connection between music and poetry. Opie has been involved in the artistic direction, curation and performances of Breathing Space. He performed and improvised as part of Gretchen Miller’s “Ariadne Project”, a Radio National documentary which allowed the listener to contribute short stories and anecdotes about divorce and separation.

Opie performs with Melissa Doecke and Peter de Jager as chamber music partners They performed as part of the new Hamer Hall’s Riverside Live series. As the Inventi Ensemble they have performed in festivals and other venues in several countries in Europe a well as the United States and Australia.

Opie and de Jager have recorded an album, French Oboe Sonatas, at the Master Performers recording studio in Brisbane. They also performed this repertoire as part of the Stones of the Yarra Music in the Chapel music series in early 2013., the Melbourne Recital Centre:, Ngeringa Arts Centre

Cellist Michael Bardon and Opie have developed the Myriad Ensemble, performing their “Twisted Fairy Tales” repertoire as part of the Feast Festival in Adelaide and participating in the Manning Winter Festival.

In 2015 the Inventi Ensemble held a crowdsourcing campaign to fund production of their first album.

== Community ==
Opie established twice weekly interactive music workshops at Melbourne's immigration detention centres that have been running since 2014. He has also created custom music demonstrations for members from Vision Australia.

Opie was also involved in Elisabeth Lowry’s Music2Go Program which involved performing in schools, aged care facilities, hospitals and community outreach programs in the Bay Area of San Francisco. He collaborated with many different musicians, including Leonie Bot, Michelle Kwon, Lucas Chen, Krisjana Thorsteinson and Amy Sedan.

In Australia, Opie performed with the Chambermaids Wind Quintet, participating in the Musica Viva ‘In Schools’ program. In addition to this, Opie performs with the West Australian Symphony's Echo program, another community outreach.
