= Two Compositions (Trio) 1998 =

Live album by Anthony Braxton
- Released: 2003
- Recorded: April 17, 1998
- Genre: Jazz
- Length: 105:12
- Label: Leo
- Producer: Anthony Braxton, Leo Feigin

Anthony Braxton chronology
Ninetet (Yoshi's) 1997 vol. 4 (1997)	Two Compositions (Trio) 1998 (2003)	Four Compositions (Washington, D.C.) 1998 (1998)

Two Compositions (Trio) 1998 is a live album by American composer and saxophonist Anthony Braxton recorded at Wesleyan University in 1998 and released on the Leo label in 2003.

== Reception ==
The Allmusic review by François Couture awarded the album 4½ stars stating "these two pieces illustrate how fascinatingly transparent his music can be. Highly recommended".

Professional ratings
Review scores
Source	Rating
Allmusic	4.5/5 stars
The Penguin Guide to Jazz Recordings	3/4 stars

== Track listing ==
All compositions by Anthony Braxton

Disc One:

1. "Composition N. 227" - 55:56

Disc Two:

1. "Composition N. 228" - 49:16

- Recorded at Wesleyan University in Connecticut on April 17, 1998

== Personnel ==
- Anthony Braxton - alto saxophone, flute, clarinet, baritone saxophone, contrabass saxophone, contrabass clarinet
- Chris Jonas - soprano saxophone, alto saxophone, tenor saxophone (Disc One)
- David Novak - bassoon, contrabass bassoon (Disc One)
- Jackson Moore - clarinet, alto saxophone, baritone saxophone (Disc Two)
- Seth Misterka - alto saxophone, baritone saxophone (Disc Two)
