= James Fei =

American classical composer (born 1974)

James Fei or Fei Cheng-ting (Chinese: 費正廷; pinyin: Fèi Zhèngtíng; born Taipei, Taiwan, 1974) is a contemporary classical music and electronic music composer and performer. He lives in the San Francisco Bay area. He plays the soprano, alto, and baritone saxophones, bass clarinet and contrabass clarinet.

Recordings of his music have been released by Leo Records, Improvised Music from Japan, CRI, and Organized Sound labels.

He has worked with the composers Anthony Braxton and Alvin Lucier. Fei received a Foundation for Contemporary Arts Grants to Artists award (2014). Fei joined the faculty of Mills College in California in 2006. He graduated from Princeton University in 1996 and received his M.A. from Wesleyan University in 1999. He has collaborated with Harald Bode (posthumously).

== Discography ==
With Anthony Braxton

- Duet (Other Minds) 2021, (Other Minds Records [OM 1033-2])
- Ninetet (Yoshi's) 1997 Vol. 1 (Leo, 1997 [2002])
- Ninetet (Yoshi's) 1997 Vol. 2 (Leo, 1997 [2003])
- Ninetet (Yoshi's) 1997 Vol. 3 (Leo, 1997 [2005])
- Ninetet (Yoshi's) 1997 Vol. 4 (Leo, 1997 [2007])

With Roscoe Mitchell

- Bells for the South Side (ECM, 2017)
