= Knitting Factory (Piano/Quartet) 1994, Vol. 2 =

Knitting Factory (Piano/Quartet) 1994, Vol. 1

Live album by Anthony Braxton
- Released: 2000
- Recorded: November 8–13, 1994
- Venue: Knitting Factory, NYC
- Genre: Jazz
- Length: 151:00
- Label: Leo; CD LR 297/298
- Producer: Leo Feigin

Anthony Braxton chronology
Knitting Factory (Piano/Quartet) 1994, Vol. 1 (1994)	Knitting Factory (Piano/Quartet) 1994, Vol. 1 (2000)	Small Ensemble Music (Wesleyan) 1994 (1994)

Knitting Factory (Piano/Quartet) 1994, Vol. 2 is a live album by composer and pianist Anthony Braxton with a quartet, recorded at the Knitting Factory in 1994 and released on the Leo label in 2000.

== Reception ==
Professional ratings
Review scores
Source	Rating
Allmusic	4/5 stars
The Penguin Guide to Jazz Recordings	3/4 stars

The AllMusic review by François Couture stated "This production stands aside Braxton's impressive body of work for two reasons: first, he sits at the piano; second, the quartet plays jazz standards instead of his own compositions. Actually, with this piano quartet, the saxophonist-turned-pianist took everybody to jazz school. Crossing – no, transcending – genre boundaries, Braxton moves from swing to cool to bebop and back, all the while never letting go of his love for free jazz. Essentially, Braxton puts every jazz influence that came his way during his musical upbringing in the boiler and distillates a powerful ersatz. The quartet's renditions can be very faithful at times, very mainstream. ... When the tune comes out of group improvisation and back into focus, it might not be the same one after all, since these are continuous sets and the band sometimes moves from one piece to the next through musical osmosis. Knitting Factory (Piano\Quartet) 1994, Vol. 2 is a powerful jazz lesson from a master".

== Track listing ==
Disc one

1. "I Love You" (Cole Porter) – 9:24
2. "Little Niles" (Randy Weston) – 11:18
3. "I Remember Clifford" (Benny Golson) – 15:28
4. "Blue Bossa" (Kenny Dorham) – 12:56
5. "Tadd's Delight" (Tadd Dameron) – 11:14

Disc two

1. "Reincarnation of a Lovebird" (Charles Mingus) – 17:01
2. "For Heaven's Sake" (Elise Bretton, Sherman Edwards, Donald Meyer) – 13:12
3. "Brilliant Corners" (Thelonious Monk) – 12:49
4. "Milestones" (Miles Davis) – 15:14
5. "Intro to When Sunny Gets Blue" (Anthony Braxton) – 2:37
6. "When Sunny Gets Blue" (Jack Segal, Marvin Fisher) – 13:21

== Personnel ==
- Anthony Braxton – piano
- Marty Ehrlich – alto saxophone, soprano saxophone, clarinet
- Joe Fonda – bass
- Pheeroan akLaff – drums
