= Sextet (Istanbul) 1996 =

Live album by Anthony Braxton
- Released: 1996
- Recorded: October 14, 1995
- Venue: AkBank Jazz Festival, Istanbul, Turkey
- Genre: Jazz
- Length: 97:57
- Label: Braxton House; BH 001
- Producer: Anthony Braxton, Velibor Pedevski

Anthony Braxton chronology
Four Compositions (Quartet) 1995 (1995)	Sextet (Istanbul) 1996 (1996)	Solo (Skopje) 1995 (1995)

Sextet (Istanbul) 1996 is a live album by composer and saxophonist Anthony Braxton with an sextet, recorded at the AkBank Jazz Festival in Turkey in 1995 and released on his own Braxton House label.

== Reception ==
Professional ratings
Review scores
Source	Rating
Allmusic	4.5/5 stars

The Allmusic review by Thom Jurek stated "Of the Braxton House recordings, the Sextet (Istanbul, 1996) issue is the best of the instrumental recordings released by the label. Recorded at the Akbank Jazz Festival in October of 1995, the sextet Braxton employs to perform the first compositions in his Ghost Trance Musics series is made of veteran improvisers rather than students ... Make no mistake, this ensemble isn't nearly as capable of careening through Braxton's music as the classic quartet was, but they don't have to be because this music is far more structured and doesn't lend itself as much to individual improvisational voice or to fiery pyrotechnics. Instead the sextet is a unit that relies of nuance and the trace elements in the composition that lend themselves to acts of surprise and spontaneity".

== Track listing ==
All compositions by Anthony Braxton

Disc one

1. "Composition No. 185" – 38:31
2. "Composition No. 186" – 19:09

Disc two

1. "Composition No. 186 (Continued)" – 40:17

== Personnel ==
- Anthony Braxton – flute, clarinet, contrabass clarinet, sopranino saxophone, alto saxophone
- Roland Dahinden – trombone, alto trombone
- Jason Kao Hwang – electric violin
- Ted Reichman – accordion
- Joe Fonda – bass
- Kevin Norton – drums, vibraphone, glockenspiel, percussion
