= Small Ensemble Music (Wesleyan) 1994 =

Live album by Anthony Braxton
- Released: 1999
- Recorded: November 18, 1994
- Venue: Crowell Concert Hall, Wesleyan University, Middletown, CT
- Genre: Jazz
- Length: 57:12
- Label: Splasc(H); CDH 801.2
- Producer: Giorgio Mortarino

Anthony Braxton chronology
Knitting Factory (Piano/Quartet) 1994, Vol. 2 (1994)	Small Ensemble Music (Wesleyan) 1994 (1999)	Composition No. 173 (1994)

Small Ensemble Music (Wesleyan) 1994 is a live album by composer and saxophonist Anthony Braxton with a rotating group of musicians forming trios, a duo and sextet, recorded at Wesleyan University in 1994 and released 1999 on the Italian Splasc(H) label.

== Reception ==
Professional ratings
Review scores
Source	Rating
AllMusic	4/5 stars
All About Jazz	4/5 stars

The Allmusic review by Steve Loewy stated "this CD fills an important gap in the work of Braxton by focusing on his non-quartet work of the mid-90s. Actually taken from a single concert of duo, trio, and quartet performances, the compositions are characteristically complex, though absorbingly and fascinatingly so. While the level of his classic quartet recordings is hard to beat, these small groups give a different view of the composer/performer – one laced with abstraction and densely layered harmonies". On All About Jazz Glenn Astarita noted "Throughout, the musicians spew forth-fascinating themes that often convey a sense of fragility or innocence yet with Braxton, we tend to gaze in wonderment at the end results".

== Track listing ==
All compositions by Anthony Braxton.

1. "Trio Improvisation" – 8:53
2. "Composition N° 107" – 20:24
3. "Duo Improvisation" – 6:42
4. "Three Compositions for Sextet: Composition N° 44 (108D+96)+168/Composition N° 136/Composition N° 43 +(96)+168" – 21:23

== Personnel ==
- Anthony Braxton – sopranino saxophone, soprano saxophone, alto saxophone, C melody saxophone, bass saxophone, flute, clarinet, contrabass clarinet
- André Vida – baritone saxophone, tenor saxophone (track 1)
- Brandon Evans – bass clarinet, oboe, shehnai (track 1)
- Jeanne Chloe – piano (track 2)
- Roland Dahinden (track 2), Mike Heffley (track 4) – trombone
- Ted Reichman – accordion (track 3)
- Jason Wong – violin (track 4)
- Joe Fonda – bass (track 4)
- Kevin Norton – drums, vibraphone (track 4)
