= Joe Fonda =

American jazz bassist

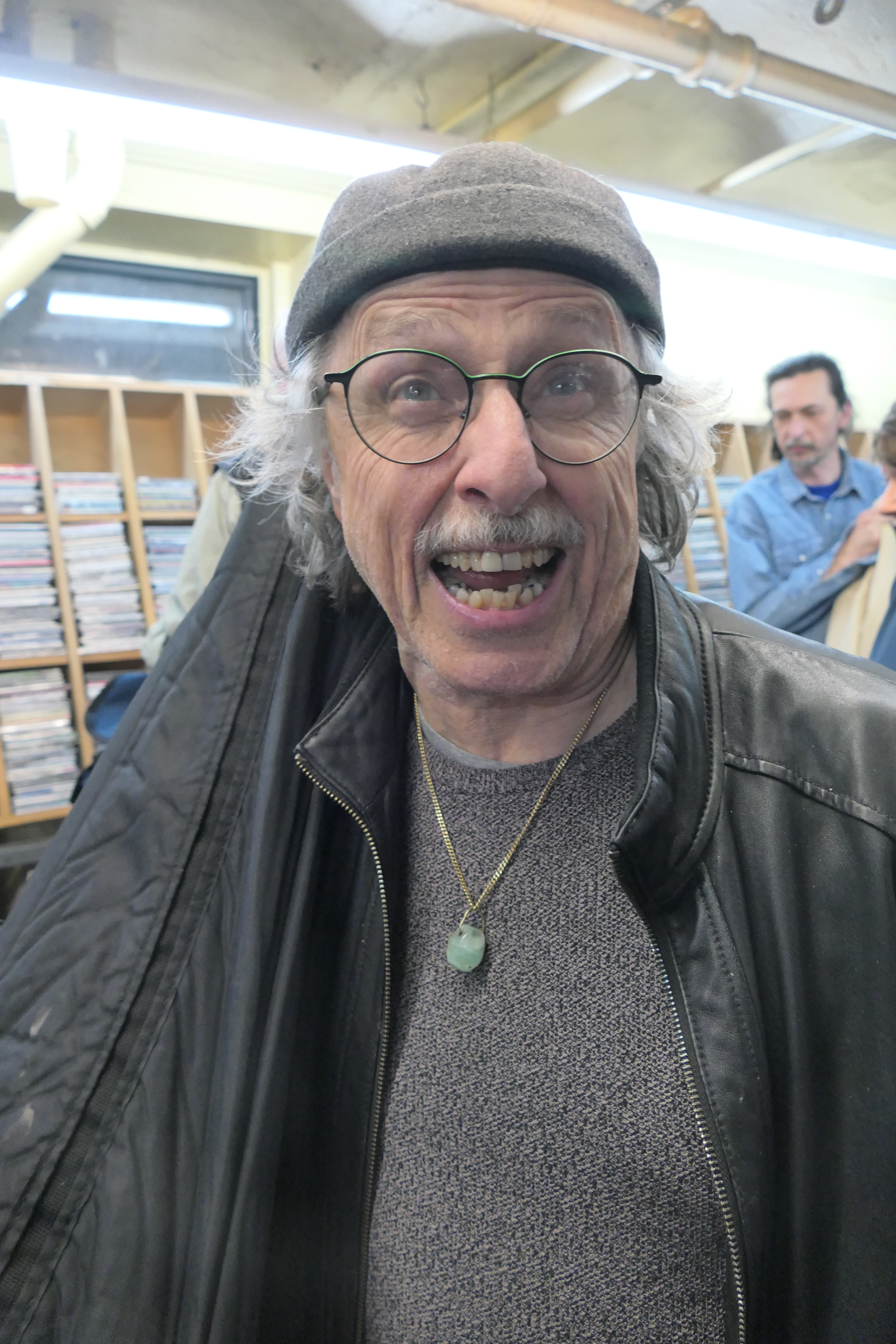

Background information
- Born: December 16, 1954 (age 71); Amsterdam, New York
- Genres: Jazz
- Occupation: Musician
- Instrument: Double bass
- Years active: 1970s–present
- Label: Konnex
- Website: joefonda.com

Joe Fonda (born December 16, 1954) is an American jazz bassist.

== Career ==
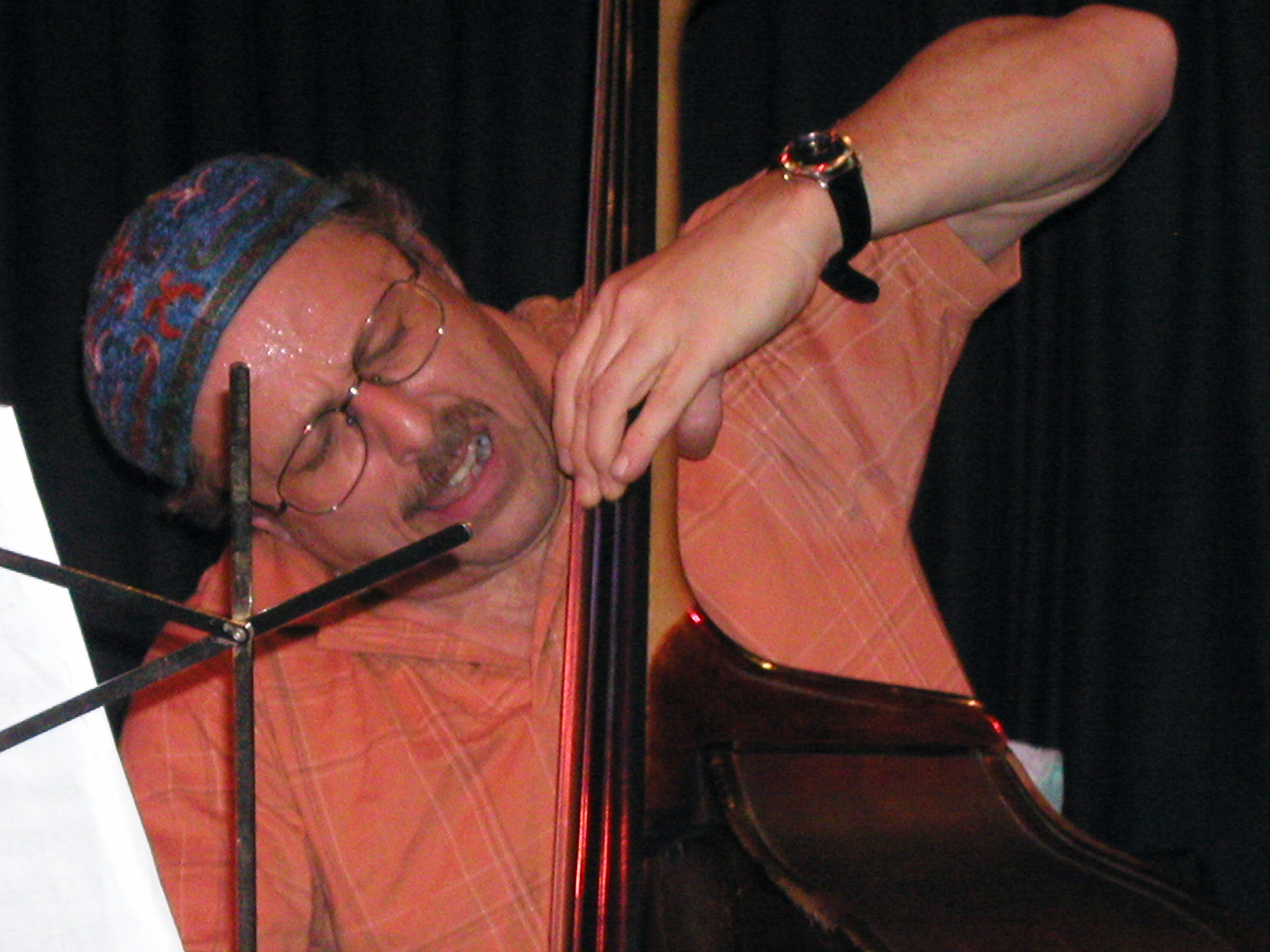
Joe Fonda in 2005

Fonda was born in Amsterdam, New York to parents who both played jazz. He played guitar as a youth but switched to bass guitar later. He studied bass at Berklee College of Music, where he also began playing upright bass. He played in the New Haven, Connecticut area in the early 1980s, and recorded with Wadada Leo Smith. In 1994 he began playing with Anthony Braxton, collaborating with him extensively for the next five years. He and Michael Jefry Stevens led the Fonda-Stevens band that began in 1991. Since the late 1990s Fonda has recorded often as a bandleader.

Fonda has also explored dance in relation to jazz. He played bass with a dance company in the 1980s and incorporated a tap dancer into his ensemble for the albums From the Source and The Healing.He is also an educator and is on the faculty of the New York Jazz Workshop in New York City.

== Discography ==
=== As leader or co-leader ===
- Looking for the Lake (Alacra, 1981)
- Up from the Sky (Kaleidoscope, 1987)
- What We're Hearing (W.E.R.F., 1996)
- From the Source (Konnex, 1997)
- Full Circle Suite (CIMP, 1999)
- When It's Time (Jazz Halo, 1999)
- Distance (Leo, Lab 2000)
- Step-in (W.E.R.F., 2000)
- Heat Suite (Konnex, 2003)
- Loaded Basses (CIMP, 2006)
- A Drop of Water (Konnex, 2008)
- Trio Joy (Klopote, 2017)
- Dreamstruck (Not Two, 2018) with Marilyn Crispell and Harvey Sorgen
- With Grace in Mind (Fundacja Słuchaj!, 2022) with Marilyn Crispell and Harvey Sorgen

With Michael Jefry Stevens

- The Wish (Music & Arts, 1995)
- Live from Brugge (W.E.R.F., 1997)
- Parallel Lines (Music & Arts, 1997)
- Evolution (Leo, 1998)
- Live at the Bunker (Leo, 2000)
- The Healing (Leo, 2002)
- Twelve Improvisations (Leo, 2004)
- Forever Real (482 Music, 2005)
- Trio (Not Two, 2007)
- Memphis (Playscape, 2009)
- Live in Katowice (Not Two, 2011)
- 20th Anniversary Tour Live (Artists Recording Collective, 2013)
- From the Roots to the Sky (Long Song, 2018)

With the Nu Band

- Live at the Bop Shop & Rochester NY (Clean Feed, 2001)
- Live (Konnex, 2005)
- The Dope and the Ghost (Not Two, 2007)
- Lower East Side Blues (Porter, 2008)
- Live in Paris (NoBusiness, 2010)
- The Cosmological Constant (Not Two, 2015)
- The Final Concert (NoBusiness, 2016)
- Live in Geneva (Not Two, 2017)

With Conference Call

- Final Answer (Soul Note, 2002)
- Variations On a Master Plan (Leo, 2003)
- Spirals The Berlin Concert (482 Music, 2004)
- Live at the Outpost Performance Space (482 Music, 2006)
- What About...? (Not Two, 2010* Poetry in Motion (Clean Feed, 2008))
- Seven (Live @ Firehouse 12) (Not Two, 2013)
- Prism (Not Two, 2020)

With the FAB Trio

- Transforming the Space (CIMP, 2003)
- Live at the Iron Works Vancouver (Konnex, 2005)
- A Night in Paris (Live at the Sunset) (Marge, 2008)
- Live in Amsterdam (Porter, 2009)
- History of Jazz in Reverse (TUM, 2011)

With the OGJB Quartet (Oliver Lake, Graham Haynes, Fonda, Barry Altschul)

- Bamako (TUM, 2019)
- Ode to O (TUM, 2022)

=== As sideman ===
With Barry Altschul

- The 3dom Factor (TUM, 2013)
- Tales of the Unforeseen (TUM, 2015)
- Live in Kraków (Not Two, 2017)
- Long Tall Sunshine (Not Two, 2021)

With Anthony Braxton

- Anthony Braxton's Charlie Parker Project 1993 (hat ART, 1995)
- Knitting Factory (Piano/Quartet) 1994, Vol. 1 (Leo, 1995)
- Knitting Factory (Piano/Quartet) 1994, Vol. 2 (Leo, 1995)
- 10 Compositions (Duet) 1995 (Konnex, 1996)
- Piano Quartet, Yoshi's 1994 (Music & Arts, 1996)
- Composition No. 173 (Black Saint, 1996)
- Sextet (Istanbul) 1996 (Braxton House, 1996)
- Tentet (New York) 1996 (Braxton House, 1996)
- Four Compositions (Quartet) 1995 (Braxton House, 1997)
- Octet (New York) 1995 (Braxton House, 1997)
- Ensemble (New York) 1995 (Braxton House, 1997)
- Small Ensemble Music (Wesleyan) 1994 (Splasc(H), 1999)
- Trillium R (Braxton House, 1999)
- Knitting Factory (Piano/Quartet) 1994, Vol. 2 (Leo, 2000)
- Ninetet (Yoshi's) 1997 Vol. 1 (Leo, 2002)
- Ninetet (Yoshi's) 1997 Vol. 2 (Leo, 2003)
- Ninetet (Yoshi's) 1997 Vol. 3 (Leo, 2003)
- Ninetet (Yoshi's) 1997 Vol. 4 (Leo, 2007)
- GTM (Knitting Factory) 1997 Vol. 1 (New Braxton House, 2011)
- GTM (Knitting Factory) 1997 Vol. 2 (New Braxton House, 2011)

With Satoko Fujii

- Duet (Long Song, 2016)
- Mizu (Long Song, 2018)
- Triad (Long Song, 2018)
- Four (Long Song, 2019)

With others

- Remi Alvarez, Trio 3D (Konnex, 2012)
- Karl Berger, Gently Unfamiliar (Tzadik, 2014)
- Roy Campbell Jr., Relentlessness Live at the Sunset (Marge, 2011)
- Roland Dahinden, Naima (Mode, 1997)
- Guillermo Gregorio, Intersecting Lives (2020)
- Charlie Mariano, Elegy for a Goose (Mariano Studios, 1981)
- Bobby Naughton, Zoar (Otic, 2001)
- Kevin Norton, Knots (Music & Arts, 1998)
- Kevin Norton, For Guy Debord (Barking Hoop, 1999)
- Vesna Pisarovic, Petit Standard (Jazzwerkstatt, 2019)
- Archie Shepp, Phat Jam in Milano (Dawn of Freedom 2009)
- Leo Smith, Procession of the Great Ancestry (Chief, 1989)
- Walter Thompson, The Colonel (Nine Winds, 1998)
- Tiziano Tononi, Trouble No More... All Men Are Brothers (Long Song, 2017)
- Mark Whitecage, Mark Whitecage & Liquid Time (Acoustics, 1990)
- Mark Whitecage, Consensual Tension (CIMP, 1998)
