= Jason Kao Hwang =

Chinese American violinist and composer (born 1957)

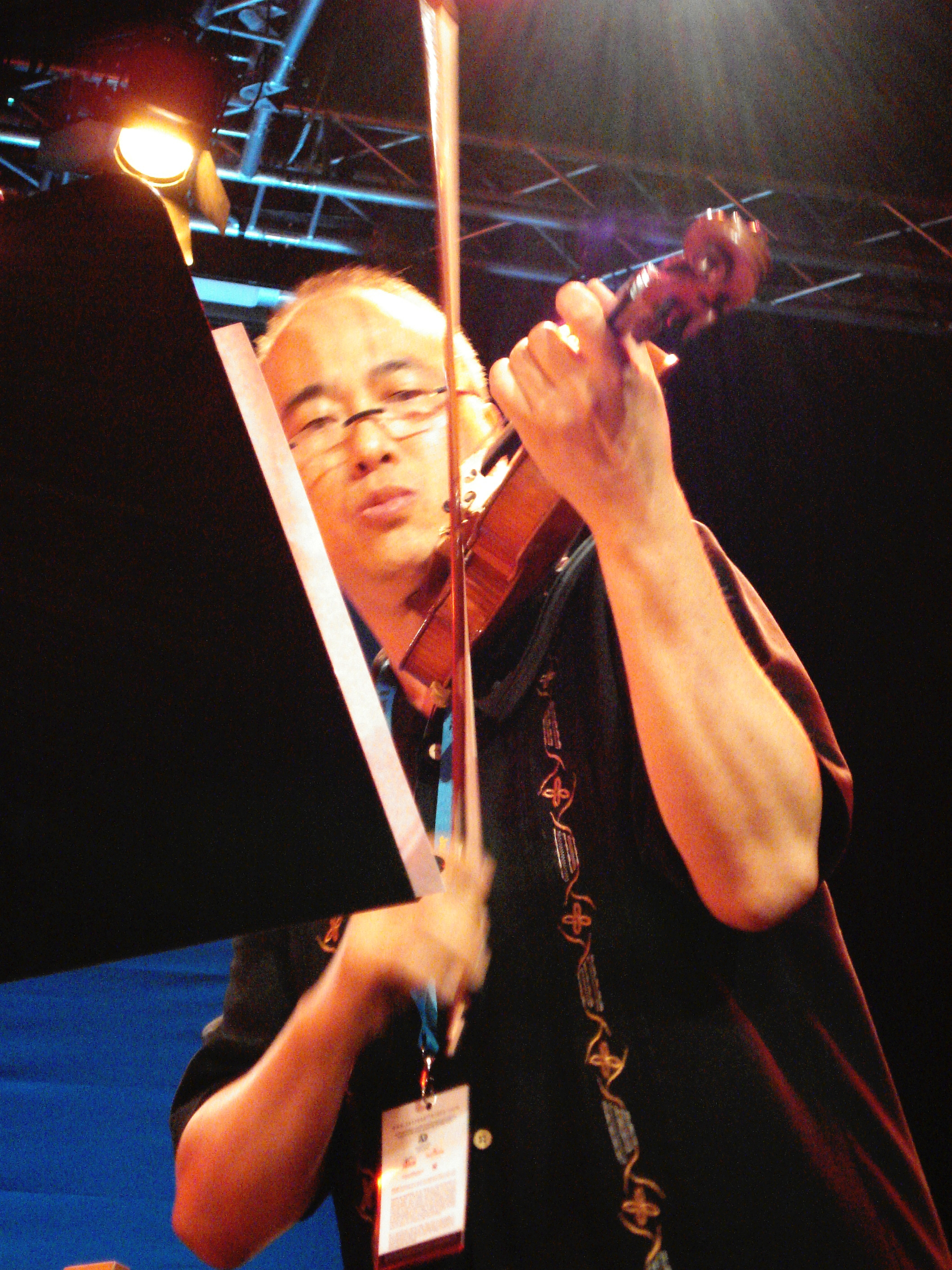
- Hwang performing at the Saalfelden International Jazz Festival in 2009
- Born: 1957; Lake Forest, Illinois
- Occupations: violinist; composer
- Website: jasonkaohwang.com

Jason Kao Hwang (born 1957) is a Chinese American violinist and composer. He is known for his unconventional and improvisational jazz violin technique as well as his chamber opera The Floating Box: A Story in Chinatown which premiered in 2001 and was released in 2005 on New World Records.

== Life and career ==
Hwang's parents had emigrated to the United States from Hunan after World War II. He was born in Lake Forest, Illinois and grew up in Waukegan. He studied classical violin before attending New York University where he received a degree in film and television. During his time at NYU, he became interested in jazz, and soon devoted himself to a career as a musician. He was active in New York City's free jazz scene in the late 1970s and early 1980s, but over the next decade he increasingly focused on Asian American jazz. His later work, including his opera The Floating Box and his extended composition Burning Bridge for a mixed ensemble of jazz, classical and Chinese instruments, has explored his own identity as an Asian American.

== Discography ==
With Jason Kao Hwang and the Spontaneous River Orchestra

- Symphony of Souls (Mulatta Records), 2013

With Billy Bang

- Outline No. 12 (Celluloid, 1982 [1983])

With Anthony Braxton

- Sextet (Istanbul) 1996 (Braxton House, 1995 [1996])
- Octet (New York) 1995 (Braxton House, 1995 [1997])

With Jerome Cooper

- Outer and Interactions (About Time, 1988)

With Dominic Duval

- Cries and Whispers (Cadence Jazz, 1999 [2001])

With William Parker

- Through Acceptance of the Mystery Peace (Centering, 1980)
- Sunrise in the Tone World (AUM Fidelity, 1995 [1997])

With Henry Threadgill

- Too Much Sugar for a Dime (Axiom, 1993)
- Carry the Day (Columbia, 1995)

With Reggie Workman

- Altered Spaces (Leo, 1993)

== See also ==
- Asian American jazz
