= Seven Standards 1995 =

Studio album by Anthony Braxton Mario Pavone Quintet
- Released: 1995
- Recorded: January 11, 1995
- Studio: East Side Sound, NYC
- Genre: Jazz
- Length: 65:12
- Label: Knitting Factory Works; KFW 168
- Producer: Anthony Braxton, Mario Pavone

Anthony Braxton chronology
Composition No. 173 (1994)	Seven Standards 1995 (1995)	11 Compositions (Duo) 1995 (1995)

Seven Standards 1995 is an album by pianist/improviser Anthony Braxton and bassist Mario Pavone's Quintet recorded in 1995 and released on the Knitting Factory Works label.

== Reception ==
Professional ratings
Review scores
Source	Rating
Allmusic	4/5 stars

The Allmusic review by Brian Olewnick stated "The pieces, as well as Braxton's approach to the piano, tend to ramble albeit with much affection shown toward the material. He sounds a bit like a looser, less organized Don Pullen, beginning his solos inside the changes but inevitably working them into freer territory. His comping behind the other soloists is reasonably competent if perfunctory. It must be said that his voice on piano has little of the distinction or passion expressed on his multiple reeds. The rest of the musicians play the date in a fairly straight manner resulting in an OK blowing session, but all involved have created far more striking work elsewhere".

== Track listing ==
1. "Dewey Square" (Charlie Parker) – 10:50
2. "Autumn in New York" (Vernon Duke) – 9:00
3. "All or Nothing at All" (Arthur Altman, Jack Lawrence) – 5:00
4. "Eronel" (Thelonious Monk) – 8:24
5. "These Foolish Things" (Holt Marvell, Jack Strachey, Harry Link) – 10:43
6. "The End of a Love Affair" (Edward Redding) – 12:04
7. "Straight Street" (John Coltrane) – 9:11

== Personnel ==
- Anthony Braxton – piano
- Mario Pavone – bass
- Thomas Chapin – alto saxophone, flute, piccolo
- Dave Douglas – trumpet
- Pheeroan akLaff – drums
