= 11 Compositions (Duo) 1995 =

Live album by Anthony Braxton and Brett Larner
- Released: 1997
- Recorded: March 24, 1995
- Venue: Crowell Concert Hall, Wesleyan University, Middletown, CT
- Genre: Jazz
- Length: 78:45
- Label: Leo; CD LR 244
- Producer: Leo Feigin

Anthony Braxton chronology
Seven Standards 1995 (1995)	11 Compositions (Duo) 1995 (1997)	10 Compositions (Duet) 1995 (1995)

11 Compositions (Duo) 1995 is an album by composer and saxophonist Anthony Braxton with kotoist Brett Larner, recorded at Wesleyan University in 1995 and released on the Leo label.

== Reception ==
Professional ratings
Review scores
Source	Rating
AllMusic	4/5 stars
The Penguin Guide to Jazz Recordings	4/4 stars

The Allmusic review by Steve Loewy stated:

Here is another example of the remarkable versatility of Anthony Braxton. For this series of nearly eighty minutes of carefully arranged duets, Braxton performs on flute; contra-alto, contrabass, Bb, and soprano clarinets; and sopranino, alto, and F saxophones. Brett Larner joins him on traditional 13-string koto and 17-string bass koto. The combinations of sounds are utterly fascinating; the duo allures with deceptive simplicity. While some of the compositions lean toward familiar abstraction, others are surprisingly melodic. Larner is a fine foil for Braxton's explorations, which demonstrate a slightly off-kilter bop sensibility. ... While not an essential part of the ever-growing Braxton discography, 11 Compositions is nonetheless a highly rewarding session.

— Loewy, Steve. 11 Compositions – Review at AllMusic. Retrieved June 13, 2017.

== Track listing ==
All compositions by Anthony Braxton.

1. "Composition 65" – 4:57
2. "Composition 74B" – 8:12
3. "Composition 72H" – 2:46
4. "Composition 74E" – 8:11
5. "Composition 72A (Take 2)" – 3:51
6. "Composition 72F" – 6:07
7. "Composition 74D" – 15:17
8. "Composition 74A" – 5:27
9. "Composition 72C" – 4:18
10. "Composition 87" – 15:31
11. "Composition 72A (Take 1)" – 3:42

== Personnel ==
- Anthony Braxton – flute, clarinet, contralto clarinet, contrabass clarinet soprano clarinet, sopranino saxophone, alto saxophone, F saxophone
- Brett Larner – 13-string koto, 17-string bass koto
