= 19 (Solo) Compositions, 1988 =

19 [Solo] Compositions, 1988

Live album by Anthony Braxton
- Released: 1989
- Recorded: April 8 & 16, 1988
- Venue: Killian Hall, Massachusetts Institute of Technology (Cambridge, MA); Intersection for the Arts (San Francisco, CA)
- Genre: Jazz
- Length: 54:36
- Label: New Albion; NA 023
- Producer: Joel Gordon and Foster Reed

Anthony Braxton chronology
Zurich Concerts (1988)	19 [Solo] Compositions, 1988 (1989)	Solo (London) 1988 (1988)

19 [Solo] Compositions, 1988 is a live album by composer and saxophonist Anthony Braxton featuring solo performances recorded in 1988 and released on the New Albion label.

== Reception ==
Professional ratings
Review scores
Source	Rating
Allmusic	4/5 stars

The Allmusic review by Scott Yanow stated:

These live concerts feature Anthony Braxton on 19 selections, each of which explore a different idea or mood. ... Although free in spots, Braxton's performances also have their own logic and are quite concise.

— Yanow, Scott. Anthony Braxton: 19 Solo Compositions – Review at AllMusic. Retrieved November 11, 2016.

== Track listing ==
All compositions by Anthony Braxton except where noted.

1. "138A (ballade)" - 2:57
2. "106D (relationship)" - 3:25
3. "118F (buzz logic)" - 2:46
4. "138B (african violets)" 2:26
5. "77G (whole)" - 3:14
6. "118A (intervallic)" - 3:17
7. "138C (long)" - 2:25
8. "106J (pointillistic)" - 2:40
9. "77C (triplet diatonic)" - 3:05
10. "26F (104/M kelvin)" - 1:50
11. "You Go to My Head" (J. Fred Coots, Haven Gillespie) - 4:17
12. "119I (+99E) (medium dance)" - 1:47
13. "119G (multiphonic)" - 1:58
14. "Round 'Bout Midnight" (Thelonious Monk, Cootie Williams, Bernie Hanighen) - 2:44
15. "99B (line)" - 3:47
16. "106A (quarter)" - 2:56
17. "138D (ballade)" - 2:17
18. "Half Nelson" (Miles Davis) - 5:10
19. "106C (triadic spiral)" - 3:04
- Recorded at Killian Hall, Massachusetts Institute of Technology in Cambridge, Massachusetts on April 8, 1988 (tracks 1–16) and Intersection for the Arts in San Francisco, CA on April 16, 1988 (tracks 17–19)

== Personnel ==
- Anthony Braxton - alto saxophone
