= Composition No. 173 =

Studio album by Anthony Braxton
- Released: 1996
- Recorded: December 19–21, 1994
- Genre: Jazz
- Length: 58:55
- Labels: Black Saint; 120166-2
- Producer: Flavio Bonandrini

Anthony Braxton chronology
Small Ensemble Music (Wesleyan) 1994 (1994)	Composition No. 173 (1996)	Seven Standards 1995 (1995)

Composition No. 173 (subtitled For 4 Actors, 14 Instrumentalists Constructed Environment and Video Projections) is an album by American saxophonist and composer Anthony Braxton with orchestra and actors recorded in 1994 for the Italian Black Saint label.

== Reception ==
The AllMusic review by "Blue" Gene Tyranny stated "This musically and textually complex composition examines movement-strategies that occur in normal life in various spaces ... The music is exciting and contrapuntally dense, and at other times mysteriously sustained. Maps of geography (sounds moving about the real and imaginary and video "virtual" lands) and musical graph strategies are treated as analogs. A thoughtful and innovative "multimedia" work".

Professional ratings
Review scores
Source	Rating
AllMusic	4/5 stars

== Track listing ==
All compositions by Anthony Braxton.

1. "Composition No. 173":
  1. "Opening Music – Introduction" – 15:39
  2. Scene One – Interlude Duo"" – 16:16
  3. "Scene Two (A) – Interlude Ensemble" – 14:22
  4. "Scene Two (B)" – 5:12
  5. "Closing Music" – 7:26

== Personnel ==
- Anthony Braxton – conductor

Actors

- Steve Ben Israel – "Arnold"
- Laura Arbuckle – "Jeremy"
- Isha Beck – "Miss Tisingham"
- Baba Ben Israel – "Molly"

Musicians

- Melinda Newman – oboe; soloist
- Brandon Evans – sopranino saxophone, bass clarinet; soloist
- Bo Bell – bassoon
- Jennifer Hill – clarinet
- Danielle Langston, Nickie Braxton – violin
- Brett W. Larner – koto
- Kevin O'Neil – guitar
- Sandra Miller, Jacob Rosen – cello
- Dirck Westervelt, Joe Fonda – bass
- Josh Rosenblatt – percussion
