= Duo (London) 1993 =

Live album by Anthony Braxton and Evan Parker
- Released: 1993
- Recorded: May 23, 1993
- Venue: London Jazz Festival, Bloomsbury Theatre, Camden, England
- Genre: Jazz
- Length: 47:39
- Label: Leo; CD LR 193
- Producer: Leo Feigin

Anthony Braxton chronology
| Trio (London) 1993 (1993) | Duo (London) 1993 (1993) | Twelve Compositions (1993) |

Duo (London) 1993 is a live album featuring performances by saxophonists Anthony Braxton and Evan Parker which was recorded at the Bloomsbury Theatre as part of the 1993 London Jazz Festival and released on the Leo label.

== Reception ==
Professional ratings
Review scores
| Source | Rating |
|---|---|
| Allmusic | 4/5 stars |
| The Penguin Guide to Jazz Recordings | 4/4 stars |

The Allmusic review by Brian Olewnick stated "A live duo performance by musicians of this extraordinarily high caliber occasionally results in something incredible but perhaps more often describes a battle of egos with neither side giving in. In this case, the participants appeared willing to compromise and to some extent lay aside their commitment to the vast and idiosyncratic musical structures that they had developed over the year. If the recording still fails to live up to impossibly high expectations, it is nonetheless a fine album on its own merits".

== Track listing ==
All compositions by Anthony Braxton and Evan Parker.

1. "ParkBrax ≠ 1" – 14:26
2. "BraxPark ≠ 2" – 6:24
3. "ParkBrax ≠ 3" – 7:09
4. "BraxPark ≠ 4" – 9:36
5. "ParkBrax ≠ 5" – 9:59

== Personnel ==
- Anthony Braxton – alto saxophone, sopranino saxophone
- Evan Parker – tenor saxophone, soprano saxophone
