= Composition 192 =

Live album by Anthony Braxton and Lauren Newton
- Released: 1998
- Recorded: June 20, 1996
- Venue: Unsung Music Festival, Queen Elizabeth Hall, London, England
- Genre: Jazz
- Length: 62:30
- Label: Leo; CD LR 251
- Producer: Leo Feigin

Anthony Braxton chronology
Eight by Three (1996)	Composition 192 (1998)	Tentet (New York) 1996 (1996)

Composition 192 is a live album by composer and saxophonist Anthony Braxton with vocalist Lauren Newton, recorded at Queen Elizabeth Hall in 1996 and released on the Leo label.

== Reception ==
Professional ratings
Review scores
Source	Rating
AllMusic	2/5 stars
The Penguin Guide to Jazz Recordings	3/4 stars

The Allmusic review by Scott Yanow stated "This is one of the stranger Anthony Braxton recordings. Braxton (heard on various reeds, particularly the sopranino) and singer Lauren Newton perform a 62½-minute piece. ... As the composer states in the liners, there is no development, attempt at creating melodies or desire to stick to a certain tonality; instead, this is what he dubbed "ghost trance music." Definitely for specialized taste".

== Track listing ==
1. "Composition 192" (Anthony Braxton) – 62:30

== Personnel ==
- Anthony Braxton – flute, clarinet, bass clarinet, contrabass clarinet sopranino saxophone, alto saxophone, F saxophone
- Lauren Newton – vocals
