= Eugene (1989) =

Live album by Anthony Braxton with the Northwest Creative Orchestra
- Released: 1989
- Recorded: January 31, 1989
- Genre: Avant-garde jazz
- Length: 79:27
- Label: Black Saint
- Producer: Mike Heffley

Anthony Braxton chronology
Four Compositions (Solo, Duo & Trio) 1982/1988 (1989)	Eugene (1989) (1989)	Seven Compositions (Trio) 1989 (1989)

Eugene (1989) is an album by the American saxophonist and composer Anthony Braxton with the Northwest Creative Orchestra recorded at the University of Oregon in 1989 for the Italian Black Saint label.

== Reception ==
The AllMusic review by Scott Yanow, awarded the album 3 stars calling it "A stimulating set of avant-garde music". The Penguin Guide to Jazz gave the album four out of four stars and included it in its suggested “core collection”.

Professional ratings
Review scores
Source	Rating
AllMusic	3/5 stars
The Penguin Guide to Jazz	4/4 stars

== Track listing ==
All compositions by Anthony Braxton.

1. "Composition No. 112" – 10:03
2. "Composition No. 91" – 9:53
3. "Composition No. 134" – 10:49
4. "Composition No. 100" – 8:48
5. "Composition No. 93" – 8:26
6. "Composition No. 45" – 12:55
7. "Composition No. 71" – 10:32
8. "Composition No. 59" – 8:01
- Recorded at Beall Hall at the University of Oregon in Eugene, Oregon, on January 31, 1989

== Personnel ==
- Anthony Braxton – alto saxophone, conductor, composer
- The Northwest Creative Orchestra:
  - Rob Blakeslee, John Jensen, Ernie Carbajal – trumpet
  - Ed Kammerer, Tom Hill, Mike Heffley – trombone
  - Thom Bergeron, Jeff Homan, Carl Woideck, Mike Curtis – woodwinds
  - Mike Vannice – woodwinds, piano
  - Todd Barton – synthesizers
  - Joe Robinson – guitar
  - Forrest Moyer – bass
  - Tom Kelly – percussion
  - Charles Dowd – percussion, vibraphone
