= Ensemble (New York) 1995 =

Live album by Anthony Braxton
- Released: 1997
- Recorded: November 24, 1995
- Venue: Tri-Centric (Thanksgiving) Festival, Knitting Factory, NYC
- Genre: Jazz
- Length: 49:36
- Label: Braxton House; BH 007
- Producer: Anthony Braxton, Velibor Pedevski

Anthony Braxton chronology
Octet (New York) 1995 (1994)	Ensemble (New York) 1995 (1997)	Solo Piano (Standards) 1995 (1995)

Ensemble (New York) 1995 is a live album by composer and saxophonist Anthony Braxton with an ensemble, recorded at the Knitting Factory in 1995 and released on his own Braxton House label.

== Reception ==
Professional ratings
Review scores
Source	Rating
AllMusic	4/5 stars

The Allmusic review by Thom Jurek stated "This performance of "Composition 187" by an 11-piece ensemble is an attempt by the composer—who also performs—to erect a sound sculpture along contructivist principles regarding time and space. How this comes off to the listener is as a series of long repetitive phrases by the reeds and winds and a series of contrapuntal responses by strings and percussion entwined in a third harmonic equation by the entire ensemble tonally as the piece goes on. Members begin to break off into smaller groupings until the theme itself has transmuted into another tonal dimension and becomes a fragmentary element in the sonic construction of musical terms and their relationship to the time/space continuum. ... this is brave new work for Braxton, who is writing more often now for larger ensembles and is allowing his sense of humor—which is profound, believe it or not—to enter into his writing and recording. There are sounds here that evoke carnivals and circuses as well as parades and rallies. All of them are balanced by shifts of timbre and meter in his architecture. The intervallic structure alone is a dynamism that turns back the notion that interval is merely a device for enhancing or restricting improvisation. Braxton makes it an end in and of itself with a host of instruments creating the necessary shifts for intervallic invention mutate from one to another without seam or stitch. This is a brilliant work".

== Track listing ==
1. "Composition No. 187" (Anthony Braxton) – 49:36

== Personnel ==
- Anthony Braxton – flute, E♭ clarinet, B♭ clarinet, contrabass clarinet, sopranino saxophone, alto saxophone, F saxophone
- J. D. Parran – E♭ clarinet, baritone saxophone
- Aaron Stewart – tenor saxophone
- Libby Van Cleve – English horn
- Melinda Newman – oboe
- Lily White – alto saxophone
- Jacquie Carrasco, Gwen Lasteer – violin
- Nioka Workman – cello
- Joe Fonda – bass
- Kevin Norton – drums, vibraphone, glockenspiel, percussion
