= Recital Paris 71 =

Studio album /Live album by Anthony Braxton
- Released: 1971
- Recorded: January 2 & 4, 1971
- Studio: Europasonor Studios and Theatre de l'Epée des Bois, Paris
- Genre: Jazz
- Length: 34:02
- Label: Futura; GER 23
- Producer: Gérard Terrones

Anthony Braxton chronology
This Time... (1970)	Recital Paris 71 (1971)	The Complete Braxton (1971)

Alternate Cover

Recital Paris 71 is an album by American jazz saxophonist and composer Anthony Braxton recorded in 1971 and released on the Futura label. The album features a solo saxophone performance of "Come Sunday" (dedicated to Johnny Hodges), and a composition by Braxton performed on four multitracked pianos (dedicated to pianist/composer David Tudor.)

== Track listing ==
1. "Come Sunday" (Duke Ellington) - 25:10
2. "G N 6 (X' 70B)" (Dedicated To David Tudor) 8:52

== Personnel ==
- Anthony Braxton - alto saxophone, piano
