= Four Compositions (Quartet) 1995 =

Album

Live album by Anthony Braxton
- Released: 1997
- Recorded: August 19, 1995
- Venue: Wesleyan University, Middletown, CT
- Genre: Jazz
- Length: 58:02
- Label: Braxton House; BH 005
- Producer: Anthony Braxton, Velibor Pedevski

Anthony Braxton chronology
10 Compositions (Duet) 1995 (1995)	Four Compositions (Quartet) 1995 (1997)	Sextet (Istanbul) 1996 (1995)

Four Compositions (Quartet) 1995 is a live album by composer and saxophonist Anthony Braxton with a quartet, recorded at Wesleyan University in 1995 and released on the Braxton House label.

== Reception ==
Professional ratings
Review scores
Source	Rating
AllMusic	2.5/5 stars

The AllMusic review by Brian Olewnick called it "the inauguration of what would come to be known as his Ghost Trance Music. Generally, this subgenre is characterized by a repeated unison melodic line played in evenly stressed eighth notes which wanders somewhat willy-nilly across the scale but is held by at least two of the instrumentalists at any given time throughout the piece. Soloists, to the extent they may be considered as such, offer embroideries on this central stalk only to return to the pattern after a time, allowing others to spin their own elaboration" and stated "Subsequent recordings would offer meatier readings of this aspect of Braxton's work (notably Composition 193 for Tentet), but it's certainly fascinating to witness its genesis here. The colors utilized serve to create a bright and playful atmosphere, a welcome approach to music that had the potential to sound a little dry and academic".

== Track listing ==
All compositions by Anthony Braxton.

1. "Composition No. 182" – 12:17
2. "Composition No. 183" – 9:51
3. "Composition No. 184" – 19:51
4. "Composition No. 181" – 16:03

== Personnel ==
- Anthony Braxton – alto saxophone, sopranino saxophone, soprano clarinet
- Ted Reichman – accordion
- Joe Fonda – bass
- Kevin Norton – drums, vibraphone, glockenspiel, percussion
