= The Complete Braxton =

Studio album by Anthony Braxton
- Released: 1973
- Recorded: February 4–5, 1971
- Studio: Polydor, London
- Genre: Jazz
- Label: Freedom; FLP 40112/3
- Producer: Alan Bates

Anthony Braxton chronology
Recital Paris 71 (1971)	The Complete Braxton (1973)	Paris Concert (1971)

The Complete Braxton (also released as The Complete Braxton 1971) is an album by American jazz saxophonist and composer Anthony Braxton, recorded in 1971 and released on the Freedom label. It features a variety of musicians, including trumpeter Kenny Wheeler, pianist Chick Corea, bassist Dave Holland, drummer Barry Altschul, and the London Tuba Ensemble.

The album was recorded while Braxton was in London with Circle. According to Braxton, the album's title was assigned by Alan Bates, producer and founder of Freedom Records. Braxton commented: "I would never call my work 'The Complete Braxton' or any of this nonsense."

== Reception ==
Professional ratings
Review scores
Source	Rating
AllMusic	4/5 stars
The Rolling Stone Jazz Record Guide	4/5 stars

The AllMusic review by Scott Yanow said, "Lots of very interesting performances come from a master of the avant-garde who has always followed his own musical path".

== Track listing ==
All compositions by Anthony Braxton are graphically titled and the following attempts to translate the title to text.

1. "N 508-10 (4G) [Composition 6K]" - 4:35
2. "J-572 (431)-1 [Composition 6J]" - 16:35
3. "67M F-12 [Composition 6A]" - 5:15
4. "ZM-F-K [Composition 22]" - 15:00
5. "R76-4 [Composition 6I]" - 9:47
6. "3-24 (Tuba Realization) [Composition 4]" - 8:01
7. "JNK 4 Degrees [Composition 6L]" - 14:32
8. "4-16 CJF [Composition 6M]" - 6:18

== Personnel ==
- Anthony Braxton - alto saxophone, sopranino saxophone, flute, clarinet, contrabass clarinet, conductor
- Kenny Wheeler - trumpet, flugelhorn (tracks 2, 3 & 5)
- Chick Corea- piano (tracks 1 & 7)
- Dave Holland - bass, cello (tracks 2, 3 & 5)
- Barry Altschul - drums, percussion, bells (tracks 2, 3 & 5)
- London Tuba Ensemble: (track 6)
  - Geoffrey Adams, James Anderson, Michael Barnes, John Fletcher - E♭ tuba
  - Paul Lawrence - C tuba
