= Six Standards (Quintet) 1996 =

Live album by Anthony Braxton with Dave Douglas
- Released: 2004
- Recorded: November 22, 1995
- Venue: Knitting Factory, NYC
- Genre: Jazz
- Length: 71:24
- Label: Splasc(H); CDH 863.2
- Producer: Peppo Spagnoli

Anthony Braxton chronology
Solo (Skopje) 1995 (1995)	Six Standards (Quintet) 1996 (2004)	Octet (New York) 1995 (1995)

Six Standards (Quintet) 1996 is a live album by pianist/improviser Anthony Braxton with trumpeter Dave Douglas recorded in 1995 at the Knitting Factory and released on the Italian Splasc(H) label in 2004.

== Track listing ==
1. "Woody 'n' You" (Dizzy Gillespie) – 11:52
2. "Blues and the Abstract Truth" (Oliver Nelson) – 16:25
3. "Ruby, My Dear" (Thelonious Monk) – 13:52
4. "Like Sonny" (John Coltrane) – 6:54
5. "Lazy Bird" (Coltrane) – 11:16
6. "Dee's Dilemma" (Mal Waldron) – 11:05

== Personnel ==
- Anthony Braxton – piano
- Dave Douglas – trumpet
- Mark Whitecage – alto saxophone, soprano saxophone
- Mario Pavone – bass
- Warren Smith – percussion
