= Seven Compositions (Trio) 1989 =

Live album by Anthony Braxton
- Released: 1990
- Recorded: March 21, 1989
- Venue: Maison de la Culture, Amiens, France
- Genre: Jazz
- Length: 58:21
- Label: hatART CD 6025
- Producer: Pia Uehlinger and Werner X. Uehlinger

Anthony Braxton chronology
Eugene (1989) (1989)	Seven Compositions (Trio) 1989 (1990)	2 by 2 (1989)

Seven Compositions (Trio) 1989 is a live album by American composer and saxophonist Anthony Braxton recorded in France in 1989 and released on the hatART label.

== Reception ==
Professional ratings
Review scores
Source	Rating
AllMusic	4/5 stars
All About Jazz	5/5 stars

AllMusic awarded the album 4 stars and the review by Scott Yanow stated "As usual Braxton's improvising is quite advanced and original but is colorful and fiery enough to always hold on to open-eared listener's attention. This is one of literally dozens of stimulating Anthony Braxton sessions currently available". On All About Jazz Troy Collins noted "Seven Compositions (Trio) 1989 is a telling document of Braxton's versatility as an innovative composer and congenial collaborator".

== Track listing ==
All compositions by Anthony Braxton except where noted.

1. "Composition 40D / Composition 40G (+63)" – 19:36
2. "All The Things You Are / The Angular Apron / Composition 6A" (Jerome Kern, Oscar Hammerstein II / Tony Oxley / Anthony Braxton) – 26:36
3. "Composition 40J / Composition 110A (+108B+69J)" – 12:06

== Personnel ==
- Anthony Braxton – flute, sopranino saxophone, soprano saxophone, alto saxophone, C melody saxophone, clarinet
- Adelhard Roidinger – bass
- Tony Oxley – drums
