= Trio (Victoriaville) 2007 =

Live album by Anthony Braxton
- Released: 2007
- Recorded: May 20, 2007
- Genre: Jazz
- Length: 59:36
- Label: Victo

Anthony Braxton chronology
GTM (Syntax) 2003 (2007)	Trio (Victoriaville) 2007 (2007)	12+1tet (Victoriaville) 2007 (2007)

Trio (Victoriaville) 2007 is a live album by American composer and saxophonist Anthony Braxton recorded in 2007 and released on the Victo label.

== Reception ==
The Allmusic review by François Couture awarded the album 4½ stars stating "This is simply one of Braxton's freshest albums of the decade".

Professional ratings
Review scores
Source	Rating
Allmusic	4.5/5 stars

== Track listing ==
All compositions by Anthony Braxton

1. "Composition No. 323c" - 59:36

- Recorded at the Festival International De Musique Actuelle in Victoriaville, Quebec (Canada) on May 20, 2007

== Personnel ==
- Anthony Braxton - sopranino saxophone, soprano saxophone, alto saxophone, baritone saxophone, contrabass saxophone
- Taylor Ho Bynum - cornet, bugle, trumpbone, piccolo trumpet, bass trumpet, mutes, shells
- Mary Halvorson - electric guitar
