= 10 Compositions (Duet) 1995 =

Live album by Anthony Braxton and Joe Fonda
- Released: 1996
- Recorded: August 11, 1995
- Venue: Wesleyan University, Middletown, CT
- Genre: Jazz
- Length: 72:41
- Label: Konnex; KCD 5071
- Producer: Anthony Braxton, Joe Fonda

Anthony Braxton chronology
11 Compositions (Duo) 1995 (1995)	10 Compositions (Duet) 1995 (1996)	Four Compositions (Quartet) 1995 (1995)

10 Compositions (Duet) 1995, also released as Duets (1995), is a live album by composer and saxophonist Anthony Braxton with bassist Joe Fonda, recorded at Wesleyan University in 1995 and originally released on the Konnex label.

== Reception ==
Professional ratings
Review scores
Source	Rating
AllMusic	4.5/5 stars
The Penguin Guide to Jazz Recordings	3/4 stars

The Allmusic review by Chris Kelsey stated:

This is Anthony Braxton doing what he does best -- playing and improvising on his own idiosyncratic small-group compositions, this time in duet with bassist Joe Fonda. The two also have a go at a pair of standards, which come off as well as one might expect -- you either love or hate the way Braxton interprets traditional material -- but they are heard to best advantage on the several originals written by each. ... This album is a small, rough-cut gem from the mine of available Braxton recordings.

On All About Jazz Troy Collins said:

On this meeting Braxton and Fonda share ample space. Each comments on the tunes in tandem without dominating the roiling, circuitous interplay. A brilliant program addressing all aspects of the jazz tradition, Duets 1995 is a solid representation of Braxton's all-encompassing aesthetic and a wonderful introduction to an enigmatic and often misunderstood genius.

== Track listing ==
All compositions by Anthony Braxton except where noted.

1. "All of You" (Cole Porter) – 9:50
2. "Rentlessness" (Joe Fonda) – 10:29
3. "Out of the Cage" (Fonda) – 5:05
4. "Something from the Past" (Fonda) – 5:30
5. "Composition No. 168 + (147 + 63)" – 10:24
6. "Composition No. 136" – 10:07
7. "Composition No. 173" – 11:17
8. "Autumn in New York" (Vernon Duke) – 10:08

== Personnel ==
- Anthony Braxton – alto saxophone, sopranino saxophone, flute, clarinet, contrabass clarinet
- Joe Fonda – bass
