= Yoshi's =

Nightclub in Oakland, California, US

Coordinates: 37.7961°N 122.2782°W

Yoshi's Oakland

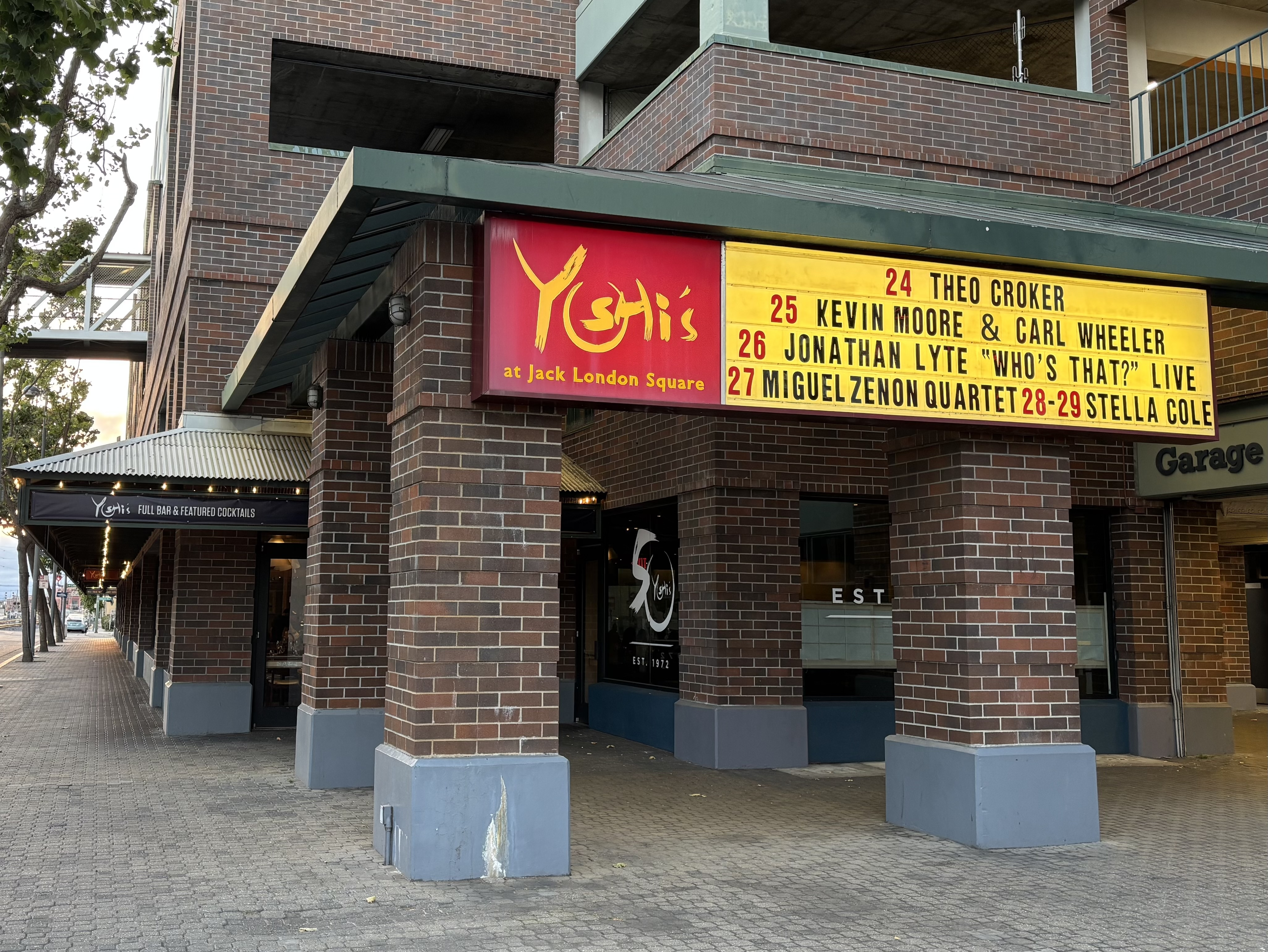
- Interactive map of Yoshi's Oakland
- Full name: Yoshi's Japanese Restaurant and Music Venue
- Address: 510 Embarcadero West; Oakland, California
- Location: Jack London Square
- Owner: Kaz Kajimura, Yoshie Akiba, and Hal Campos
- Capacity: 310
- Public transit: Oakland – Jack London Square Oakland Ferry Terminal

Construction
- Opened: May 18, 1997
- Cost: $3 million

Website
- Venue Website

Yoshi's (also known as Yoshi's Jazz Club and Yoshi's Oakland) is a nightclub located in Jack London Square in Oakland, California, United States. The venue originally opened in 1972 as a restaurant in Berkeley, later moving to Claremont Avenue in Oakland. In 1979, the restaurant expanded into a lounge and nightclub hosting local and national jazz musicians.

In 1985, the venue was rebranded as Yoshi's Nitespot until 1997, when it moved yet again within the Port of Oakland. The current location began operations May 18, 1997 with a performance by Tito Puente.

== History ==
The venue began as a Japanese restaurant in Berkeley established by Yoshie Akiba, Kaz Kajimura and Hiroyuki Hori, though the club soon moved to a larger space on Claremont Avenue and began to feature live jazz music. It eventually gained a reputation as one of the most significant jazz venues on the West Coast.

In May 1997, the club moved to Jack London Square during the revitalization of the Port of Oakland, as a 330-seat, 17,000-square-foot (1,600 m^{2}) jazz concert hall with an attached 220 seat Japanese restaurant, assisted by funding from the Oakland Development Agency.

== San Francisco location ==
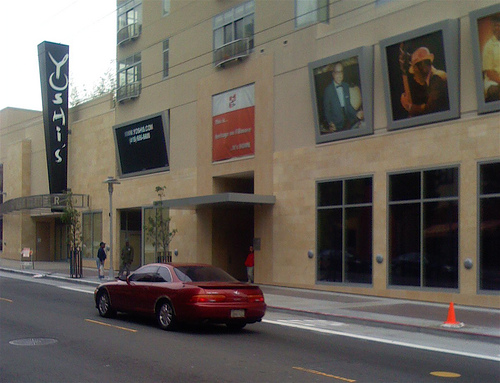
Yoshi's in San Francisco

On November 28, 2007, it opened a second 28,000-square-foot (2,600 m^{2}) location in San Francisco's Fillmore District, as a flagship of the city's attempt to restore the formerly African-American neighborhood (which was uprooted in the 1970s by urban renewal) as a center of black culture and jazz. Roy Haynes was the featured performer on the opening night of the new San Francisco location. On July 1, 2014, Yoshi's San Francisco was purchased by Fillmore Live Entertainment Group. On November 1, 2014, the name changed to The Addition, and three months later it closed entirely.

== Recordings ==
- Dee Dee Bridgewater Live at Yoshi's (Dee Dee Bridgewater album) (Verve, 2000)
- George Coleman At Yoshi's (Theresa, 1989)
- Robben Ford The Authorized Bootleg (Blue Thumb, 1997)
- Pat Martino Live at Yoshi's (Pat Martino album) (Blue Note, 2001)
- Joe Pass Live at Yoshi's (Joe Pass album) (Pablo, 1992)
- Joe Pass Meditation: Solo Guitar (Pablo, 2002)
- Mulgrew Miller Live at Yoshi's Volume I (Mulgrew Miller Trio) (MaxJazz, 2004)
- Mulgrew Miller Live at Yoshi's Volume II (Mulgrew Miller Trio) (MaxJazz, 2005)

== Noted performers ==
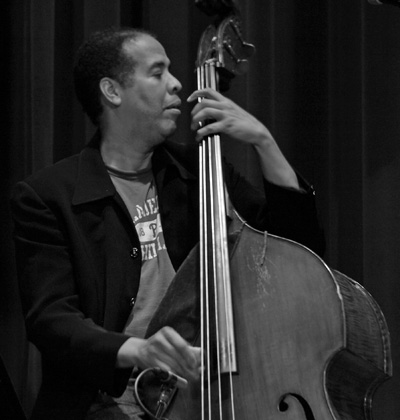
Stanley Clarke performing in 2009 in San Francisco

- El Debarge
- Allan Holdsworth
- Eric Johnson
- Anna Nalick
- Arturo Sandoval
- Kenny Washington
- Max Roach
- Pat Martino
- Benny Green
- Jimmy Smith
- Oscar Peterson
- McCoy Tyner
- Freddie Hubbard
- Wayne Shorter
- Joe Henderson
- Pharoah Sanders
- Chick Corea
- Bill Frisell
- Joe Lovano
- Joshua Redman
- Esperanza Spalding
- Diana Krall
- Stanley Clarke
- Taj Mahal
- John Scofield
- Anthony Braxton
- Jimmy McGriff
- John Santos
- Digable Planets
- Tito Puente
- Robben Ford
- Jimmy Witherspoon
- Pat Metheny
- Mulgrew Miller
- Abdullah Ibrahim
- Dee Dee Bridgewater
- David Frishberg
- Charlie Hunter
- Jeff "Tain" Watts
- Art Ensemble of Chicago
- Airto
- Dave Brubeck
- Dave Mathews (solo)
- Bonnie Raitt
- Booker T (without MGs)
- Brian Culbertson

== See also ==
- List of jazz clubs
