= Wilber Morris =

American jazz musician (1937–2002)

Wilber Morris (November 27, 1937 – August 8, 2002) was an American jazz double bass player and bandleader. He was the brother of the cornetist, composer, and conductor Butch Morris.

Wilber Morris recorded widely, and performed with such musicians as Pharoah Sanders, Steve Habib, Sonny Simmons, Alan Silva, Joe McPhee, Horace Tapscott, Butch Morris, Arthur Blythe, Charles Gayle, William Parker, and Billy Bang, Charles Tyler, Dennis Charles, Roy Campbell, Avram Fefer, Alfred 23 Harth, Borah Bergman and Rashied Ali.

== Discography ==
=== As leader or co-leader ===
- 1981: Collective Improvisations (Bleu Regard)
- 1983: Wilber Force (DIW Records)
- 1995: Breathing Together (Freedom Jazz)
- 1996: The October Revolution (Evidence) with Rashied Ali, Borah Bergman, and Joe McPhee; recorded in 1994
- 2001: Drum String Thing (CIMP)
- 2001: Live at Tonic (DIW)
- 2019: Monks (some real music) with Borah Bergman and Sunny Murray; recorded in 1996

=== As sideman ===
With Marshall Allen

- PoZest (CIMP, 2000)

With Billy Bang

- Sweet Space (Anima, 1979)
- Rainbow Gladiator (Soul Note, 1981)
- Untitled Gift (Anima, 1982)
- Invitation (Soul Note, 1982)
- Outline No. 12 (Celluloid, 1982 [1983])

With Thomas Borgmann

- BMN Trio - Nasty & Sweet (Nobusiness, 2013)
- BMC Trio Organic (Lotus Sound, 1998)
- Stalker Songs (CIMP, 1997)
- The Last Concert: Dankeschön (Silkheart, 1998)
- Boom Swing - BMC Trio (Konnex, 1998)
- BMN Trio - You See What We're Sayin' (CIMP, 1998)

With Rob Brown

- Visage (Marge, 2000)

With Avram Fefer and Bobby Few

- Few and Far Between (Boxholder, 2001)

With Avram Fefer and Steve Swell

- Lucille's Gemini Dream (CIMP, 2002)

With Charles Gayle

- Daily Bread (Black Saint, 1995)

With Steve Habib

- Live At Joe Joe's

With Frank Lowe

- Exotic Heartbreak (Soul Note, 1981)

With Makanda Ken McIntyre

- A New Beginning (Passin' Thru, 2001)

With David Murray

- Body and Soul
- Remembrances
- Picasso
- New Life
- Lucky Four
- Murray's Steps
- Ballads for Bass Clarinet

With Kevin Norton

- Not Only In That Golden Tree (Clean Feed, 2003)

With Positive Knowledge

- Live in New York (Edgetone, 2003)

With Alan Silva

- Alan Silva & the Sound Visions Orchestra (Eremite, 2001)
- H.Con.Res.57/Treasure Box (Eremite, 2003)

With Steve Swell

- This Now! (Cadence Jazz, 2003)
