= Live at the Knitting Factory =

Live at the Knitting Factory may refer to a number of live concert releases by several musicians, usually referring to recordings at the New York music venue, the Knitting Factory. These include:

- More Live at the Knitting Factory by Charles Gayle
- Solo Sessions Vol. 1: Live at the Knitting Factory by John Legend
- Live at the Knitting Factory (Roscoe Mitchell album)
- Naked City Live, Vol. 1: The Knitting Factory 1989 by Naked City
- Live at the Knitting Factory New York City by Telectu
- John Zorn's Cobra: Live at the Knitting Factory by John Zorn
