= Geography (disambiguation) =

Geography is the study of Earth and its features, inhabitants, and phenomena.

Geography may also refer to:

== Media ==
=== Music ===
- Geography (Front 242 album)
- Geography (Tom Misch album)
- "Geography", a song by Macintosh Plus from Floral Shoppe

=== Works ===
- Geography, a lost 3-volume work by Eratosthenes
- Geography (Ptolemy), Ptolemy's main work besides the Almagest
- Geography (Strabo), Strabo's 17-volume geographic encyclopedia
- Geography (journal), published by the Geographical Association

== Other uses ==
- Geography (game), a word chain game played on cities
- "Geography", a Series G episode of the television series QI (2009)

== See also ==
- Outline of geography
- Geographical (magazine)
- Geographer, one who practices geography
- Geology, the study of rocks and minerals
- Geometry (disambiguation)
