= Barreiro International Music Festival =

Music festival in portugal

OUT.FEST - Barreiro International Music Festival
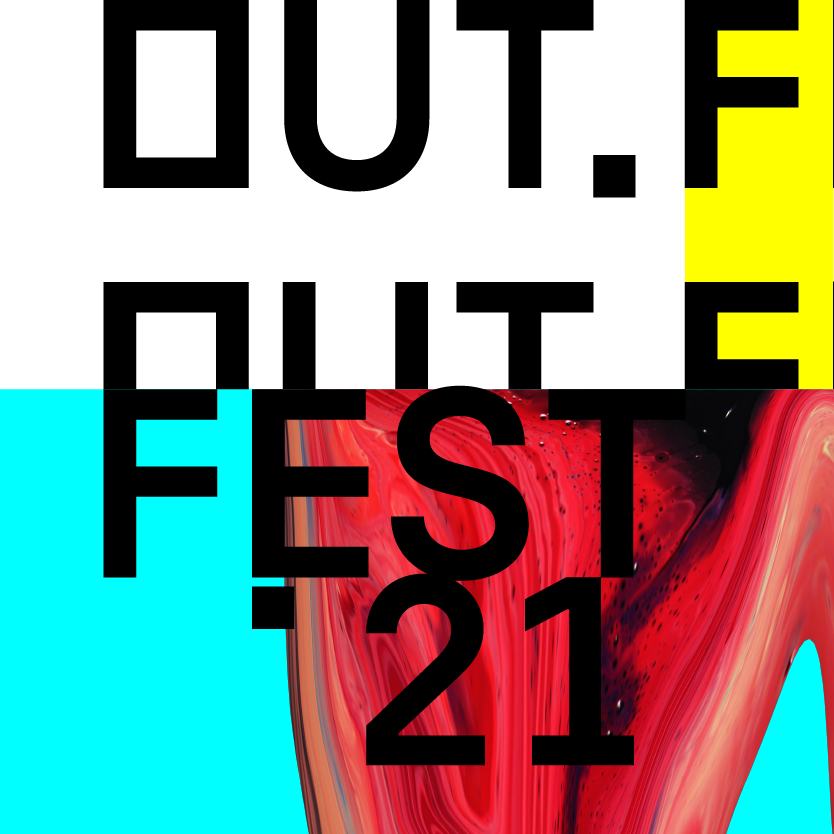
- Dates: Typically in early October
- Locations: Barreiro, Portugal
- Years active: 2004 - 2021
- Organized by: OUT.RA - Associação Cultural
- Website: https://outfest.pt

OUT.FEST – Barreiro International Exploratory Music Festival (“Festival Internacional de Música Exploratória do Barreiro” in Portuguese, generally referred to simply as OUT.FEST) is an annual music festival held in the city of Barreiro, Portugal since 2004. Although predominantly focused on live music, OUT.FEST also regularly presents music and sound art exhibitions, installations and films, as well as music production workshops with some of the artists performing in the festival.

== History ==
While the festival is always held in Barreiro, the venues used have constantly changed since its inception, with each day of the festival typically being held in a different venue. Many of the sites chosen are often not regularly used for musical events of any sort - for example, the 2017 edition’s first and second days were held in a local church (Igreja de Santa Maria) and an industrial Museum (Museu Industrial da Baía do Tejo) respectively. This itinerancy and use of lesser-known local landmarks and buildings as concert spaces has been one of the hallmarks of the festival, and serves as a way to help both visitors and locals explore the city of Barreiro.

The festival has been nominated for the European Festival Awards and granted the “EFFE - Europe for Festivals, Festivals for Europe” label in recent years. OUT.FEST is also a regular feature in many Portuguese and international publications, being covered by The Wire Magazine, The Quietus, El País, RTP, VICE and Jornal Público, among others. Among the notable artists who have been a part of the festival over the years are The Fall, Panda Bear, William Basinski, Oneohtrix Point Never, Rafael Toral, Evan Parker, James Ferraro, Sei Miguel, Faust and Matana Roberts.

== Editions ==
=== 2004 ===
SIRB “Os Penicheiros”
October 22	October 23
Homemcãovelhomorto	Funkaina
Frango	dAnCE DAMage
Lemur	Orgasmo
Brainwashed by Amalia	Símio Superior + Jupanda
Émbryon (exhibit)	Émbryon (exhibit)

=== 2005 ===
==== November ====
November 15	November 19	November 25	November 26	November 27
Contraluz	Verderena Convent	Chapelaria	G.D. Ferroviários	Contraluz
Embrionário “Lixo” (exhibit)	Vigilâmbulo Caolho – “País Imaginário” (Theatre)	Grain of Sound Showcase	Fish & Sheep	Embrionário “Lixo” (exhibit)
			Lemur	
			One Might Add	

==== December ====
December 1	December 2	December 3
Contraluz	Chapelaria	G.D. Ferroviários
Phoebus	Stash/Debut	Caveira
ZLKNF		Frango
		Lobster
		Ivone

=== 2006 ===
==== November ====
November 24	November 25	November 28
Chapelaria	Espaço J	Augusto Cabrita Municipal Auditorium
Producers	Instrument modification workshop (Ruben da Costa)	Rafael Toral + Afonso Simões + Pedro Lourenço
Vitor Lopes		Ruben da Costa + PCF Moya

==== December ====
December 2	December 8	December 9	December 16
Oficina de Teatro Mário Pereira	G.D Ferróviarios	G.D Ferróviarios	Chapelaria
Manta Rota	Loosers	Mécanosphère	Homemcaovelhomorto
Manuel Mota + Rita Vozone	Osso + Branches	Gala Drop	Gnu
Goodbye Toulouse	Dopo	Sapien Sapiens	
	Draftank vs Plan ft M0rph3u	Aquaparque	

=== 2008 ===
May 16	May 17	May 23	May 24
Augusto Cabrita Municipal Auditorium		Chapelaria	Barreiro Municipal Library Auditorium
David Maranha	Flower / Corsano Duo	Pocketbook of Lightning	P.M.A + Coclea (Live Visuals)
Uton	Ignatz		
One Might Add	Aluk Todolo		
A Parte Maldita	Calhau!		
Peter Bastien	Agape		
May 15 to 24 (Augusto Cabrita Municipal Auditorium)
Vera Marmelo – Black and white portrait (exhibit)

=== 2009 ===
May 15	May 16	May 20	May 22	May 23	May 28	May 29
Terreiro do Paço Ferry Station (Lisbon)	Barreiro Jazz School		Augusto Cabrita Municipal Auditorium	"Os Franceses" Garden Bandstand	Barreiro Jazz School	
Peter Bastien (River Call)	R-	Mão Sem Dedos	William Basinski	F.R.I.C.S (Fanfarra Recreativa e Improvisada Colher de Sopa)	Robert Foster	Frango (Live Soundtrack to Invasion of the Thunderbolt Pagoda)
	Ana Baliza e Edmund Cook (performance)		Sei Miguel Metal Music 4	SDUB “Os Franceses”		
	Joana Linda (Video – Art)		Cian Nugent	Spectrum		
	Colectivo Hülülülü / Chili com Carne (exhibit)			Whitehouse		
				Os Loosers		
				Ducktails		
				Black Joker (Spencer Clark)		

=== 2010 ===
October 5	October 6	October 8	October 9	October 10	October 12	October 14	October 15	October 16
Be Jazz Café	Municipal Theatre	Verderena Convent	Quimigal Cultural House	Cooperativa Cultural Popular Barreirense	Barreiro Naval Club	Municipal Theatre	Verderena Convent	Augusto Cabrita Municipal Auditorium
Alexander Von Schlippenbach	Norberto Lobo	Noël Akchoté	Panda Bear	Calhau! O Método do Leopardo	Stellar Om Source	Rafael Toral	Kosmicdream	Lol Coxhill
			Oneohtrix Point Never			Tetuzi Akiyama	Emeralds	Rodrigo Amado Motion Trio
								AJM Collective
5 a 10 de Outubro
The Caretaker (Ouvido Raro – Online Installation)

=== 2011 ===
October 4	October 5	October 6	October 7	October 8
Be Jazz Café	Verderena Convent	Barreiro Municipal Theatre	Barreiro Municipal Art Gallery	Barreiro Municipal Art Gallery
Schlippenbach Trio	Moebius	Bill Orcutt	Sei Miguel Unit Core + Norberto Lobo	Escuta Criativa (Workshop)
	Kwjaz		Part Wild Horses Mane On Both Sides	G.D. “Os Ferroviários”
				Oneida
				Stephen O’Malley
				Damo Suzuki & Sunflare
				Tropa Macaca
				Eitr

=== 2012 ===
October 10	October 11	October 12	October 13
Be Jazz Café	Barreiro Municipal Theatre	Verderena Convent	Palhais Church
Red Trio	Helena Espvall	Kevin Drumm	Luís Antero - Concerto para olhos vendados (Sons do Arco Ribeirinho Sul)
	Steve Gunn	Yong Yong	Barreiro Jazz School
		Helm	Man Forever
			Rodrigo Amado
			Be Jazz Cafe
			The Fish

=== 2013 ===
Outubro 8th	Outubro 9th	Outubro 10th	Outubro 11th	Outubro 12th
Be Jazz Cafe	Barreiro Art Gallery	Verderena Convent	Augusto Cabrita Municipal Auditorium	Barreiro Municipal Art Gallery
Fred Van Hove	Joe Morris	Oren Ambarchi	Mohn (Wolfgang Voigt & Jörg Burger)	Steve Gunn & Mike Cooper
Johns Lunds & TR Kirstein	Rhodri Davies	Rafael Toral : Space Collective 2	Lee Gamble	Sirius (Yaw Tembé & Monsieur Trinité)
			Richard Pinhas	
		Barreiro Municipal Art Gallery		G.D. Ferroviários
		Workshop: “The Properties of Free Music / “As Propriedades da Música Livre – Joe Morris		The Fall
				Skullflower
				HHY & The Macumbas
				Carla Bozulich’s Bloody Claws

=== 2014 ===
October 2	October 3	October 4	October 5
Be Jazz Cafe	Barreiro Jazz School	Barreiro Municipal Theatre	Verderena Convent
Peter Brötzmann & Steve Noble	Peter Evans – Masterclass	Carla Bozulich (Workshop)	Charles Cohen
Norberto Lobo			Rabih Beaini
	Barreiro Jazz School	Be Jazz Cafe	
	Dean Blunt	Open Mind Ensemble	
	Fennesz	Rodrigo Amado: Wire Quartet	
	Peter Evans Quintet		
		G.D. Ferroviários	
		The Ex	
		Faust	
		Magik Markers	
		Putas Bêbadas	

=== 2015 ===
October 8	October 9	October 10	October 11
Velvet Be Jazz Club / Barreiro Jazz School	Oficinas Addac System (Lisboa)	ADAO (Associação Desenvolvimento Artes e Ofícios)	Barreiro Jazz School
Akira Sakata & Giovanni Di Domenico	Russell Haswell & André Gonçalves (Workshop)	Russell Haswell	Laraaji
Matana Roberts		Golden Teacher	
Miguel Mira, Pedro Sousa & Afonso Simões		Gala Drop	
Conde de Ferreira School	Baía do Tejo Industrial Museum	Peter Brötzmann & Jason Adasiewicz	
Eddie Prévost (Workshop)	Vladislav Delay	Caveira	
	AMM	Filipe Felizardo	
	David Maranha, Helena Espvall, Ricardo Jacinto & Norberto Lobo	Niagara	
		Zs	
		Black Zone Myth Chant	
		Älforjs	
		Bleidd	
		Cotrim	
		Low Jack	
		Rabu Mazda & Van Ayres	

=== 2016 ===
October 6	October 7	October 8	October 9
ADDAC SYSTEM (Lisboa)	Barreiro Jazz School	ADAO – Associação Desenvolvimento Artes e Ofícios	Verderena Convent
Peter Kember & André Gonçalves (Workshop)	Lê Quan Ninh (Workshop)	Hieroglyphic Being	André Gonçalves
Velvet Be Jazz Club / Barreiro Jazz School	Augusto Cabrita Municipal Auditorium	Tropa Macaca	
Agustí Fernandez	Sonic Boom / Experimental Audio Research	Acid Mothers Temple	
Lê Quan Ninh	Evan Parker / Barry Guy / Paul Lytton	Ondness	
Jamal Moss, Orphy Robinson, Yaw Tembé & Evan Parker	Klein	Manuel Mota	
		Foodman	
		Van Ayres	
		Gume	
		Les Gracies	
		POLIDO	
		Irmler + Liebezeit	

=== 2017 ===
October 4	October 5	October 6	October 7
Santa Maria Church	Baía do Tejo Industrial Museum	Augusto Cabrita Municipal Auditorium	ADAO (Associação Desenvolvimento Artes e Ofícios)
Jonathan Uliel Saldanha + Coral Tab & B-Voice	Charlemagne Palestine	Lolina	Alex Zhang Hungtai / David Maranha / Gabriel Ferrandini
	Quarteto de Sei Miguel	Casa Futuro	DJ Nigga Fox
	Caterina Barbieri	Pere Ubu (The Moon Unit)	Black Dice
			This Is Not This Heat
			Putas Bêbadas
			DJ Problemas
			Gyur
			Coletivo Vandalismo
			Bookworms
			Simon Crab
			Nocturnal Emissions
			Jejuno

=== 2018 ===
October 5	October 6
Baía do Tejo A4 Building	Barreiro Jazz School / Lado B
Anton Nikkilä	Clothilde
Vladimir Tarasov	Kaja Draksler
	Lea Bertucci
ADAO (Associação Desenvolvimento Artes e Ofícios)	Futebol Clube Barreirense
João Pais Filipe	Opus Pistorum
Toda Matéria	Império Pacífico
Telectu	Odete
Group A	Kerox
Nídia	
	Barreiro Municipal Library Auditorium
	Cândido Lima
	Rafael Toral Space Collective 3
	Largo do Mercado 1º Maio
	Jimi Tenor
	HHY & The Macumbas
	SIRB “Os Penicheiros”
	Mohammad Reza Mortazavi
	YEK: Burnt Friedman & Mohammed Reza Mortazavi
	Lotic
	Linn da Quebrada
	Edifício A4 Baía do Tejo
	John T Gast
	DJ Lycox

=== 2019 ===
October 3	October 4	October 5
Santo André Church	Nossa Senhora do Rosário Church	Moinho Pequeno
Gabriel Ferrandini e Camerata Musical do Barreiro	Kali Malone	Bezbog
Gabriel Ferrandini e Camerata Musical do Barreiro	Kali Malone	Luar Domatrix
Gabriel Ferrandini e Camerata Musical do Barreiro	Kali Malone	Violeta Azevedo
	ADAO (Associação Desenvolvimento Artes e Ofícios)	Municipal Theatre
	Calhau!	Brynje
	Ilpo Väisänen	Candura
	Yeah You	Barreiro Municipal Library Auditorium
	Alpha Maid	Angélica Salvi
	Deaf Kids	Raw Forest
	DJ Firmeza	Red Bull presents: Whitman / Gonçalves / Clothilde / Simões
		1º Maio Market Square
		Chão Maior
		David Kehoe
		SIRB “Os Penicheiros”
		James Ferraro
		Nadah El Shazly
		Dälek
		Still
		Edifício A4 Baía do Tejo
		Mo Probs (DJ Set)
		Bonaventure (DJ Set)
		Viegas (DJ Set)

=== 2020 ===
The festival did not take place in 2020 due to the COVID-19 pandemic.

=== 2021 ===
==== June ====
June 3	June 4	June 5
Paz & Amizade Park
Susana Santos Silva	Gala Drop	Tristany
Augusto Cabrita Municipal Auditorium
Rafael Toral Space Quartet	Svetlana Maraš	Gosheven
	Pedro Carneiro	Odete + Herlander
		Barreiro Municipal Library Auditorium
		Gosheven (talk)

==== October ====
October 4	October 5	October 6	October 7	October 8	October 9
Barreiro Municipal Library Auditorium	Barreiro Municipal Library Auditorium	SDUB "Os Franceses"	Barreiro Municipal Library Auditorium	Paz & Amizade Park	SDUB "Os Franceses"
João Pais Filipe & Manongo Mujica (talk)	Julia Eckhardt - "ÉLIANE RADIGUE: Intermediary Spaces" (talk)	LUMP	Vasco Alves	DJ Nigga Fox	Sarnadas 'The Humm'
João Pais Filipe & Manongo Mujica (talk)	Julia Eckhardt - "ÉLIANE RADIGUE: Intermediary Spaces" (talk)	pä	Adriana João + Pedro Tavares	DJ Nigga Fox	Sarnadas 'The Humm'
Baía do Tejo Industrial Museum	Paz & Amizade Park			AMAC	Paz & Amizade Park
Éliane Radigue's "Kyema" (diffused by Caroline Profanter)	João Pais Filipe & Manongo Mujica (concert)			Jessica Ekomane	Space Afrika
Éliane Radigue's "Kyema" (diffused by Caroline Profanter)	João Pais Filipe & Manongo Mujica (concert)			Serpente with Pedro Sousa and Margarida Garcia	Space Afrika
	Santa Maria Church				AMAC
	Three pieces from 'Occam Ocean' played by Julia Eckhardt and Enrico Malatesta				Gustavo Costa
	Three pieces from 'Occam Ocean' played by Julia Eckhardt and Enrico Malatesta				Still House Plants
