= Eddie Prévost =

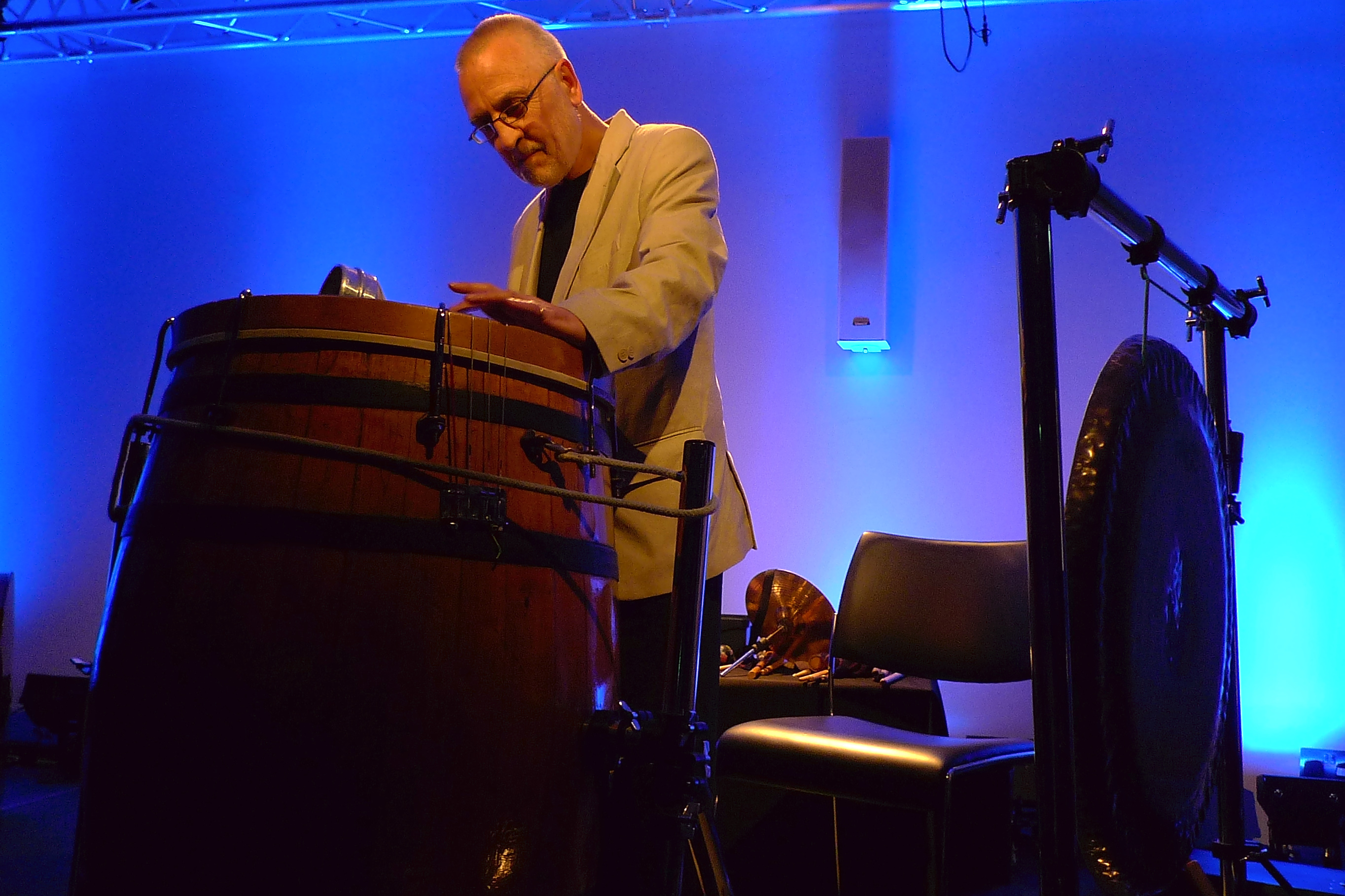
- Eddie Prévost in 2010 at Kings Place, London

Background information
- Born: Edwin John Prévost; 22 June 1942 (age 84); Hitchin, Hertfordshire, England
- Genre: Jazz
- Occupation: Musician
- Instrument: Percussion
- Years active: 1965-
- Label: Matchless

Edwin John Prévost (born 22 June 1942) is an English percussionist who founded the free improvisation group, AMM.

== Early years ==
Of Huguenot heritage, Prévost's silk weaving ancestors moved to Spitalfields in the late 17th century. He was born in Hitchin, Hertfordshire, England. Brought up by single parent mother (Lilian Elizabeth) in war-damaged London Borough of Bermondsey. He won a state scholarship to Addey and Stanhope Grammar School, Deptford, London, where to-be drummers Trevor Tomkins and Jon Hiseman also studied. Music tuition, however, was limited to singing and general classical music appreciation; he enrolled in the Boy Scouts Association (19th Bermondsey Troop) to join their marching band. As a teenager began to get involved with the emerging youth culture music; skiffle, before being introduced to a big jazz record collection of a school friend with rich parents. With a bonus from the florist, for whom Prévost worked part-time after school, purchased his first snare drum from the Len Hunt drum shop in Archer Street, Soho.

After leaving school at 16, Prévost was employed in various clerical positions, whilst continuing his musical interests. Although, by now immersed in the music of bebop, his playing technique was insufficient for purpose. New Orleans style jazz ('trad') offered scope for his growing musical prowess. He played in various bands mostly in the East End of London. It was during a tenure with one of these bands he met trumpeter David Ware, who also shared a passion for the hard-bop jazz music. In their early twenties they later formed a modern jazz quintet which ultimately included Lou Gare, who had recently moved to London from Rugby, Warwickshire, and was a student at Ealing College of Art and a member of the Mike Westbrook Jazz Orchestra.

== AMM ==
AMM was co-founded in 1965 by Lou Gare, Eddie Prévost and Keith Rowe. They were shortly joined by Lawrence Sheaff. All had a jazz background. They were, however, soon augmented by composer Cornelius Cardew. Thereafter, Cardew, Gare, Prévost and Rowe remained as basis of the ensemble until the group fractured in 1972. Other more formally trained musicians were to enter the ranks of AMM after Cardew's departure. Those to make significant contributions were cellist Rohan de Saram and pianist John Tilbury. The latter was a friend and early associate of Cardew and later became his biographer.

=== AMM philosophy ===
In contrast to many other improvising ensembles, the core aesthetic of the ensemble is one of enquiry. There was no attempt to create a spontaneous music reflecting, or emulating, other forms. The AMM sound-world emerged from what Cardew referred to as "searching for sounds". For Prévost, the following would become the core formulation which he would explore during his subsequent musical career, and explain and develop in various writings (see bibliography) and workshop activities.

We are "searching" for sounds and for the responses that attach to them, rather than thinking them up, preparing them and producing them.

In the 1980s, in response to various workshops and lectures, Prévost first formulated the twin analytical propositions of heurism and dialogue as defining concepts for an emergent musical philosophy, whilst acknowledging Cardew's construction (above). This line was explored and constantly redefined much through the London workshop experience, as his articles and his books show. (see below: The London Workshop). His 2011 book — The First Concert: an Adaptive Appraisal of a Meta Music — is described as a view "mediated through the developing critical discourse of adaptionism; a perspective grounded in Darwinian conceptions of human nature. Music herein is examined for its cognitive and generative qualities to see how our evolved biological and emergent cultural legacy reflects our needs and dreams. This survey visits ethnomusicology, folk music, jazz, contemporary music and "world music" as well as focusing upon various forms of improvisation – observing their effect upon human relations and aspirations. However, there are also analytical and ultimately positive suggestions towards future metamusical practices. These mirror and potentially meet the aspirations of a growing community who wish to engage with the world – with all its history and chance conditionals – by applying a free-will in making music that is creative and collegiate."

=== History with AMM ===
When, in the early 1970s, Cardew and Rowe began to devote their time and energy to espousing the political doctrine of an English Maoist party, a fracture occurred in the ensemble leaving the rump of Lou Gare and Eddie Prévost, who continued in a duo form making various concerts and festival appearances and leaving a legacy of two recordings. At the end of the decade a rapprochement was attempted and for a short while the quartet began playing together again. It did not last. Lou Gare departed and moved from London to Devon. While Cardew's commitment to politics made his complete withdrawal inevitable. It was during this period Prévost took an honours degree at Hatfield Polytechnic, exploring and developing his interests in history (especially East Asian) and philosophy. Musically, this left Rowe and Prévost playing together. Their recording for German ECM label "It had been an ordinary enough day in Pueblo, Colorado" is the single example of their duet period. By the late 1970s a reawakened association with John Tilbury was cemented into his permanent place in AMM. He is featured on all subsequent AMM performances and recordings (as is Prévost). In 2002 a more lasting schism occurred leading to Rowe departing from AMM and leaving Tilbury to continue with Prévost.

=== Percussion ===
The investigative dynamic of AMM leads its musicians to seek out new material. Prévost's constant exploration facilitated the range of sounds associated with his work, particularly within AMM and its extension to the many workshop ensembles. This philosophy leads to what Seymour Wright described as the "awkward wealth" of investigation. It is a position of constant examination and artistic redress.

=== Drumming ===
Drumming with AMM was principally replaced by discreet percussion work which by and large relied on sound and texture rather than rhythm. At the time of the Gare/Prévost period this position was reviewed. However, it was plain the AMM aesthetic, characteristic of the early formative period, was to have its effect. The "searching" method prevailed. And, whereas a saxophone and drums duet led to a more jazz-like expectation (amplified by Gare's reversion to a more rolling and modal post-Rollins kind of approach). Prévost's playing was noted to have acquired some unusual qualities. This lead one reviewer, Melody Maker, to remark in 1972: "His free drumming flows superbly making use of his formidable technique. It's as though there has never been an Elvin Jones or Max Roach."

Drumming however, was to take a back seat in Prévost's musical output as AMM developed and began to acquire and enhance its innovative reputation. And, apart from rare musical outings he did not commit himself, more fully, to the jazz drum kit again until 2007/08. Although, continuing to play percussion, a jazz-inflected project with Seymour Wright and Ross Lambert in an ensemble called SUM was the precursor of a period more devoted to drumming. Apart from various ad hoc ensembles, this led to various recordings including a series a CDs entitled Meetings with Remarkable Saxophonists. At date this consists of four volumes featuring Evan Parker, John Butcher, Jason Yarde and Bertrand Denzler respectively.

== The London workshop ==
Over the years Prévost has conducted many improvised music workshops. However, as a result of a seminar he conducted at The Guelph Jazz Festival, Canada in 1999, Prévost began to formulate a framework for a workshop based upon a more thorough working of AMM principles and practice. He wrote:

"I had, of course, already had long previous experience of improvisation and experimental music mostly through my participation in AMM and working closely with the composers Cornelius Cardew and Christian Wolff. From this experience I had begun a working hypothesis in my book 'No Sound is Innocent'. However, there is always more to discover. On my long flight across the Atlantic, I intuited more could be found out. Not through introspective, if rational, thought alone but, through discovery or experimentation: praxis. It can, of course, be very discomforting to watch a proposition die in practise. No theory is worth its salt unless it is fully tested. The best ideas – this experience suggests – emerge through activity. Hence, the working premise of the improvisation workshop had to be based upon an emergent set of criteria constantly tested within the cauldron of experience.

In November 1999 I made it known that a free improvisation workshop would start weekly in a room at London’s Community Music Centre, near London Bridge. Originally, under the auspices of the London Musicians' Collective, [...] these premises were found and minimal lines of communication to possible interested parties were opened. The first Friday evening (not thought to be an auspicious evening of the week because people 'went out' to have a good time) duly arrived. The room was available precisely because no one ever hired it on a Friday! I waited.

Since then the workshop has continued weekly. It has a strong collegiate atmosphere. Those who participate are themselves formulating and refining a programme of enquiry and empathy. The working premise is one of 'searching for sounds' (Cardew). The emphasis is upon discovery and not on presentation. It is a place to risk failure and develop an open and continuing processive relationship with the materials at hand and other people. As hoped and anticipated, Prévost's continual presence is no longer required. In his occasional absences senior colleagues (in particular Seymour Wright and Ross Lambert) more than adequately move the project along. To date there have been over five hundred people who have attended the weekly workshop in London, representing over twenty different nationalities. This activity is further augmented by occasional forums for discussion and London's Cafe OTO programmes ensembles drawn from the London workshop every month. There have also been occasional extended periods of collective workshop musical experimentation. And, in 2010 there was a residential workshop held in Mwnci Studios on the Dolwillym Estate, west Wales. (see various other texts: including Philip Clark's Wire piece)] There are now workshops based upon this general premise functioning in Hungary, Greece, Slovenia, Japan, Brazil and Mexico. Mostly started by alumni of the original workshop in London.

== Intermediate and experimental compositions ==
Cardew's 'Treatise' etc. Cardew's introduction to AMM in 1966 owes something to his search for musicians to perform his (then unfinished)193 pages long graphic score, 'Treatise'. The AMM musicians (at the time Lou Gare, Eddie Prévost, Keith Rowe and Lawrence Sheaff) seemed perfect candidates to embrace this bold work of imagination. And, with others (including later AMM member John Tilbury) all participated in the premier performance at the Commonwealth Institute on 8 April 1966 (check year!). But the initial impact of Cardew's induction into AMM was to bring a halt to his compositional aspirations. However, over the years since, AMM has had a long relationship with particular indeterminate and experimental works particularly those of Cardew – especially after his death in 1983. Most prominently 'Treatise'. Other favourites were 'Solo with Accompaniment', 'Autumn '60', Schooltime Compositions' and the text piece Cardew wrote particularly for AMM, 'The Tiger's Mind.' These pieces (which for a long time had been neglected within 'new' musical schedules), and occasionally others by Christian Wolff and John Cage, were sometimes played in conjunction with an AMM improvisation. Some concert promoters were, it seems, more interested in these pieces being played than the principal musical output of AMM. Hence, Prévost's ambivalence about the inclusion of such material in concert programmes. The creative search for primary performance material was diverted, in such works, in keeping with the demands of the notation or compositional scheme. This inevitably prevented the musician from (to use Cardew's own words) "being at the heart of the experiment".

== Matchless Recordings and Publishing ==
In 1979 Prévost began the recording imprint of Matchless Recordings and Publishing. Although there had been some interest by commercial labels to take on the new improvising music of the late 1960s onwards, it proved not to be satisfactory or long-lasting. Together with a number of similar initiatives, e.g. Incus Records in Britain and ICP (?) in the Netherlands, Prévost sought to take control of their own work. In the early years this was slow and painstaking work. Some years little was produced and few small sales accrued. Gradually however, Matchless recordings began to be the documenting and disseminating base for a developing body of work. Most of the AMM output is featured on Matchless and this has diversified (more so in recent years) to include other associated artists and ensembles.

In 1995, following the same principal for internal control over the output, production and dissemination of material, the publishing imprint Copula was inaugurated. The first publication was Prevost's No Sound is Innocent. Later followed by Minute Particulars in 2004. 2006 saw the publication of Cornelius Cardew: A Reader (edited by Prévost) which was a collection of Cardew's published writings accompanied by commentaries by a number of musicians associated and inspired by Cardew. This volume was an essential companion to John Tilbury's comprehensive biography Cornelius Cardew: a life unfinished which was also published by Copula in 2008. The most recent book to appear on this imprint is Prévost's The First Concert: An Adaptive Appraisal of a Meta Music (2011).

== Discography ==
=== As leader ===
- Now Here This Then (Spotlite, 1977)
- Live Vol. 1 (Matchless, 1978)
- Live Vol. 2 (Matchless, 1978)
- Continuum (Matchless, 1985)
- Flayed/Crux (Silent, 1987)
- Premonitions with Free Jazz Quartet (Matchless, 1989)
- Loci of Change (Matchless, 1996)
- Touch (Matchless, 1997)
- Concert with Veryan Weston (Matchless, 1999)
- Material Consequences (Matchless, 2001)
- The Virtue in If (Matchless, 2001)
- Silver Pyramid with Music Now Ensemble (Matchless, 2001)
- A Bright Nowhere with Conditions (Matchless, 2003)
- The Blackbird's Whistle (Matchless, 2004)
- So Are We, So Are We with Alan Wilkinson (Matchless, 2006)
- Entelechy (Matchless, 2006)
- Memories for the Future with Free Jazz Quartet (Matchless, 2009)
- Penumbrae with Jennifer Allum (Matchless, 2011)
- Visionary Fantasies with John Butcher (Matchless, 2018)
- Matching Mix (Earshots!, 2019)

With AMM

- Ammmusic (Elektra, 1967)
- Live Electronic Music Improvised (Mainstream, 1970)
- At the Roundhouse (Incus, 1972)
- To Hear and Back Again (Matchless, 1978)
- It Had Been An Ordinary Enough Day in Pueblo Colorado (Japo, 1980)
- The Crypt (Matchless, 1981)
- Generative Themes (Matchless, 1983)
- The Inexhaustible Document (Matchless, 1987)
- The Nameless Uncarved Block (Matchless, 1991)
- Newfoundland (Matchless, 1993)
- Laminal (Matchless, 1996)
- From a Strange Place (P.S.F., 1996)
- Live in Allentown USA (Matchless, 1996)
- Before Driving to the Chapel We Took Coffee with Rick and Jennifer Reed (Matchless, 1997)
- Combine and Laminates (Pogus, 1990)
- Norwich (Matchless, 2005)
- Apogee (Matchless, 2005)
- Tunes without Measure or End (Matchless, 2001)
- Fine (Matchless, 2001)
- Formanex AMM Formanex (Fibrr, 2003)
- Trinity (Matchless, 2008)
- Uncovered Correspondence (Matchless, 2010)
- Sounding Music (Matchless, 2010)
- Two London Concerts (Matchless, 2012)
- Place Sub. V. (Matchless, 2014)
- Spanish Fighters (Matchless, 2015)
- AAMM (Al Maslakh, 2018)
- An Unintended Legacy (Matchless, 2018)

With EAR

- Beyond the Pale (Big Cat, 1996)
- Phenomena 256 (Space Age, 1996)
- Millennium Music (Atavistic, 1997)
- The Koner Experiment (Space Age, 1997)

With Sakada

- Sakada (W.M.O./r, 2001)
- Undistilled (Matchless, 2002)
- 30 November 2002 (Sound, 2003)
- Never Give Up On The Margins Of Logic (Antiopic, 2004)
- Bilbao Resiste, Resiste Bilbao (Fargone, 2004)
- Askatuta (Rhizome, 2005)
- En Duo, En Crudo (Desetxea, 2005)
- Live at Titanic (Desetxea, 2005)

=== As sideman ===
With Evan Parker

- Most Materiall (Matchless, 1997)
- Supersession (Matchless, 1988)
- 888 (FMR, 2003)
- Imponderable Evidence (Matchless, 2004)
- Meetings with Remarkable Saxophonists Vol. 1 (Matchless, 2012)
- Title Goes Here (Otoroku, 2015)
- Tools of Imagination (Fundacja Sluchaj!, 2018)

With John Tilbury

- Discrete Moments (Matchless, 2004)
- John Tilbury Plays Samuel Beckett (Matchless, 2005)
- PST (Auditorium Edizioni, 2012)
- Landmark (+3 dB, 2018)

With others

- Derek Bailey, 0Re (Arrival, 2001)
- John Wolf Brennan, En.Tropo.Logy (For 4 Ears, 1999)
- John Butcher, Interworks (Matchless, 2005)
- John Butcher, Meetings with Remarkable Saxophonists Vol. 2 (Matchless, 2012)
- Cornelius Cardew, Cornelius Cardew Memorial Concert (Impetus, 1985)
- Cornelius Cardew, Piano Music 1959–70 (Matchless, 1996)
- Chris Corsano, 15.2.16 (Otoroku, 2016)
- Marilyn Crispell, Band on the Wall (Matchless, 1994)
- Sachiko M, 17.2.14 (Otoroku, 2016)
- Jim O'Rourke, Third Straight Day Made Public (Complacency 1993)
- Jim O'Rourke, Alpha Lemur Echo Two (Mycophile 2001)
- Bruce Russell, Casa Precario (CONV, 2005)
- David Sylvian, Died in the Wool – Manafon Variations (Samadhisound, 2011)
- Telectu, Quartetos (Clean Feed, 2002)
- Ken Vandermark, Unexpected Alchemy (Not Two, 2019)
- Alexander von Schlippenbach, Blackheath (Matchless, 2008)
- Christian Wolff, Early Piano Music 1951–1961 (Matchless, 2002)
- Christian Wolff, Uncertain Outcomes (Matchless, 2017)
- Marilyn Crispell, ConcertOto (Matchless, 2021)
