= Rainbow Gladiator =

Studio album by Billy Bang Quintet
- Released: 1981
- Recorded: June 10 & 11, 1981
- Genre: Jazz
- Length: 37:11
- Label: Soul Note

Billy Bang chronology
Sweet Space (1979)	Rainbow Gladiator (1981)	Untitled Gift (1982)

Rainbow Gladiator is an album by the American jazz violinist Billy Bang, recorded in 1981 and released on the Italian Soul Note label.

== Reception ==
Professional ratings
Review scores
Source	Rating
AllMusic	4/5 stars
The Penguin Guide to Jazz Recordings	4/4 stars
The Rolling Stone Jazz Record Guide	3/5 stars
Tom Hull – on the Web	A−

The editors of AllMusic awarded the album 4 stars, and reviewer Scott Yanow called it "a good introduction to his music for those who have an open mind toward adventurous jazz".

The authors of The Penguin Guide to Jazz Recordings awarded the album a full 4 stars, calling it "a terrific record, bright, percussive and packed with ideas."

Critic Tom Hull assigned the album a rating of "A−", commenting: "the interplay is exhilarating more often than not."

Robert Spencer of All About Jazz described the album as "expansive and warm," "one of Billy Bang's best recordings," and praised the title track, calling it "the brilliant, good-humored jewel of the disc."

== Track listing ==
All compositions by Billy Bang

1. "Rainbow Gladiator" - 14:19
2. "Ebony Minstrel Man" - 4:16
3. "New York After Dark" - 7:20
4. "Broken Strings" - 2:44
5. "Yaa - Woman Born on Thursday" - 5:09
6. "Bang's Bounce" - 3:23

- Recorded at Barigozzi Studio in Milano, Italy on June 10 & 11, 1981

== Personnel ==
- Billy Bang - violin
- Charles Tyler - alto saxophone, baritone saxophone
- Michele Rosewoman – piano
- Wilber Morris – bass
- Dennis Charles – drums
