= Consecration (disambiguation) =

Consecration is the solemn transfer of a person or thing to a special purpose or service.

Consecration or Consecrate may also refer to:

- Consecration in Christianity
  - Consecration in Eastern Christianity
- Consecration: The Final Recordings Part 2, a 2002 jazz album
- Consecration (band), a Serbian alternative metal group
- Consecration (album), a 1993 album by American jazz saxophonist Charles Gayle
- "Consecrate", a song by Matt Brouwer from the 2001 album Imagerical
- Consecration, a 2023 horror film
