= Night Circus =

Night Circus may refer to:

- The Night Circus, a 2011 fantasy novel by Erin Morgenstern
- The Night Circus, a 1958 play by Michael V. Gazzo
- Night Circus (EP), a 2016 release by rapper Bryce Vine
- "Night Circus", a story in the 2004 manga Alone in My King's Harem by Hoshino Lily
- "Night Circus, Part I – By the Red Moon" and "Night Circus, Part II – Trapeze", piano pieces by Borah Bergman from the 1983 album A New Frontier
