= Thomas Borgmann =

German musician

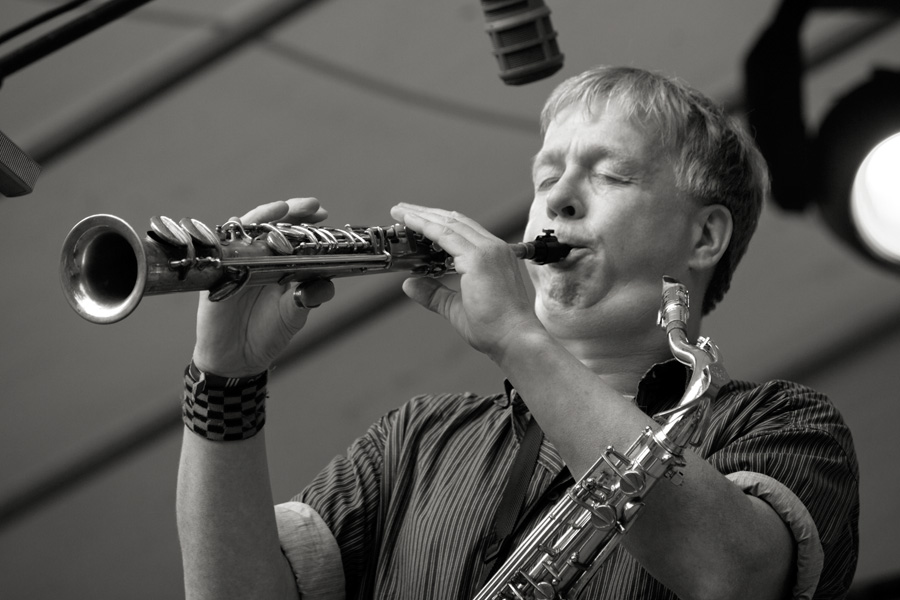
Thomas Borgmann, Offside Festival, 2008

Thomas Borgmann, born in 1955 in Münster, is a German musician (tenor, soprano, and Sopranino saxophone) and composer of Jazz, free Jazz, and free improvisation music.

== Biography ==
Borgmann began his career in the early 1980s, working mainly with the Berlin Art Ensemble with Nick Steinhaus (participating in the 1981 South American tour for the Goethe-Institut and the 1982 Nickelsdorfer Konfrontationen). He went on to the Sirone Sextet in New York in 1987. He also spent some time playing with the Hidden Quartet (with Dietmar Diesner, Erik Balke, and Jonas Akerblom), and the Noise & Toys (with Valery Dudkin, Sascha Kondraschkin). In 1991 Borgmann founded the Orkestra Kith’N Kin, bringing together Hans Reichel, John Tchicai, Pat Thomas, Jay Oliver, Mark Sanders and Lol Coxhill, amongst others. Later he toured with his quartet Ruf der Heimat, and with the trio, Blue Zoo, (with Borah Bergman and Brötzmann). Throughout 1984, and continuing until 1996, he also organized the STAKKATO festival in Berlin.

In 1995 Borgmann began working with Wilber Morris and Denis Charles, forming the BMC-Trio. After Charles' death in 1998, Borgmann and Morris teamed with Reggie Nicholson creating the "BMN-Trio", which continued performing until 2002. Borgmann also participated in the quartet Alliance with Ernst-Ludwig Petrowsky, Jayrope, and Michael Griener.

Initially teaming with Tony Buck, and Joe Williamson, Borgmann formed the trio "Boom Box", releasing their album Jazz in 2011. He continues to perform with the group, now playing with Willi Kellers and Akira Ando. He also continues to tour international Jazz festivals around the world.

During his career, Borgmann has taken part in concerts, tours, and recordings with artists including Caspar Brötzmann, Tony Buck, Paul Lytton, Evan Parker, Conny Bauer, Johannes Bauer, Charles Gayle, Lol Coxhill, Phil Minton, William Parker, Jason Hwang, Thurston Moore, Shoji Hano, Alexander von Schlippenbach, Rashied Bakr, Roy Campbell, Jr., Perry Robinson, Kip Hanrahans Latin Groove, and Jean-Paul Bourelly.

Thomas Borgmann has twice been the recipient of the Berlin Jazz-Grant, first in 1994, and again in 1996.

== Discography (selected) ==
- Orkestra Kith 'n Kin (1995), with Hans Reichel, Lol Coxhill, Dietmar Diesner, Mark Sanders, Martin Mayes, Pat Thomas, Eric Balke, Jonas Ackerblom, and Christoph Winckel, Cadence Jazz Records, (USA)
- Machine Kaput (1996), with Peter Brötzmann, Willi Kellers, and Christoph Winckel, as Ruf der Heimat
- Cooler Suite (1997), with Brötzmann, William Parker, and Rashied Bakr
- 'BMN Trio ...You See What We Sayin’? (1999), with Wilber Morris and Reggie Nicholson, CIMP, (USA)
- Live at Tunnel (2000), BMN-Trio (with Wilber Morris and Reggie Nicholson), Qbico Records (Italy)
- The Last Concert (2000), with Wilber Morris and Denis Charles, Silkheart Records, (USA)
- boom box — jazz (2011), boom box (with Willi Kellers and Akira Ando), jazzwerkstatt (Germany)
- Nasty & Sweet , BMN-Trio (with Wilber Morris and Reggie Nicholson), (2012), NoBusiness Records, NBLP 57/58
- One for Cisco , Thomas Borgmann Trio (with Max Johnson and Willi Kellers), (2016), NoBusiness Records, NBLP 91
- Some More Jazz , KEYS & SCREWS (with Jan Roder and Willi Kellers), (2020), NoBusiness Records, NBLP 133
- Secrets , Ruf der Heimat (with Christof Thewes, Jan Roder and Willi Kellers), (2020), jazzwerkstatt, jw 2020
