= Exotic Heartbreak =

Studio album by Frank Lowe Quintet
- Released: 1982
- Recorded: October 22 & 23, 1981; Barigozzi Studios, Milano, Italy
- Genre: Jazz
- Length: 40:05
- Label: Soul Note; SN 1032
- Producer: Giovanni Bonandrini

Kenny Wheeler chronology
Skizoke (1981)	Exotic Heartbreak (1982)	Live from Soundscape (1982)

Exotic Heartbreak is an album by the Frank Lowe Quintet recorded in 1981 and released on the Soul Note label.

== Reception ==
Professional ratings
Review scores
Source	Rating
AllMusic	3/5 stars
The Penguin Guide to Jazz Recordings	4/4 stars

The authors of The Penguin Guide to Jazz awarded the album 4 stars, and commented: "Lowe's turn-of-the-decade band traded on raw finesse. There is nothing here... which swaps subtlety for power. And both should help dispel any notion of Lowe as an unsubtle roarer."

Writing for The New York Times, Robert Palmer stated: "Exotic Heartbreak... is an affectionate update on the sort of tightly arranged hard-bop album that was a specialty of the Blue Note label from the mid-1950's through the mid-1960's. Frank Lowe has developed a thoughtfully muscular approach to the tenor saxophone that's exceptionally resourceful and personal, and his bandmates... are similarly animated by both an exploratory bent and a love for the hard-bop tradition. This is Mr. Lowe's finest album to date."

== Track listing ==
All compositions by Frank Lowe except as indicated

1. "Perfection" (Ornette Coleman) - 7:51
2. "Close to the Soul" - 8:02
3. "Broadway Rhumba" - 3:24
4. "Addiction Ain't Fiction" - 6:56
5. "Exotic Heartbreak" - 8:18
6. "Be Prepared" - 5:34

== Personnel ==
- Frank Lowe - tenor saxophone
- Butch Morris - cornet
- Amina Claudine Myers - piano
- Wilber Morris - bass
- Tim Pleasant - drums
