= Meditations for Piano =

Studio album by Borah Bergman
- Released: May 2003
- Recorded: February 2003
- Genre: Jazz
- Label: Tzadik

Meditations for Piano is a solo piano album by Borah Bergman. It was recorded in 2003 and released by Tzadik Records.

== Recording and music ==
The album of solo piano performances by Bergman was recorded in February 2003. There are seven tracks, all of which were composed by Bergman. In "Meditation 2", "a series of four chorded phrases are interchangeably used in repetition against droning figures and minor ninths, sevenths, and thirds, collapsing into one another to move the piece to another level." "Meditation 4" begins with a clustered forth which "is broken down immediately into single notes, which form a songlike melody that evokes a gentle call and response before the chord is restated. The development of the piece lies in how the chord is extended and extrapolated upon in the melodic sequentia."

== Release and reception ==
Professional ratings
Review scores
Source	Rating
AllMusic	4.5/5 stars
The Penguin Guide to Jazz	3.5/4 stars

Meditations for Piano was released by Tzadik Records in May 2003. The AllMusic reviewer wrote that "This is Bergman as never before heard and at his most astute and lyrical". The Penguin Guide to Jazz highlighted the contrast between previous Bergman solo recordings and this one: "Bergman still gets the same richness and intensity of sound, a mixture of solid attack and clever use of pedals, but he also brings in a keening, almost cantorial quality that is immensely attractive."

== Track listing ==
1. "Meditation 1"
2. "Meditation 2"
3. "Meditation 3"
4. "Meditation 4"
5. "Meditation 5"
6. "Meditation 6"
7. "Meditation 7"

== Personnel ==
- Borah Bergman – piano
