= Above & Beyond: An Evening in Grand Rapids =

Live album by Billy Bang Quintet Featuring Frank Lowe
- Released: 2007
- Recorded: April 28, 2003
- Venues: The Urban Institute For Contemporary Arts, Grand Rapids, Michigan
- Genre: Free jazz
- Length: 1:04:54
- Labels: Justin Time; JUST 208-2
- Producer: Chris Martin

Billy Bang chronology
Configuration (2005)	Above & Beyond: An Evening in Grand Rapids (2007)	Four Seasons: East Meets West (2009)

Above & Beyond: An Evening in Grand Rapids is a live album by the Billy Bang Quintet, led by violinist Bang, and featuring saxophonist Frank Lowe, pianist Andrew Bemkey, double bassist Todd Nicholson, and drummer Tatsuya Nakatani. It was recorded on April 28, 2003, at the Urban Institute For Contemporary Arts in Grand Rapids, Michigan, and was released in 2007 by Justin Time Records. The album marks the last recorded appearance by Frank Lowe, who had only one lung at the time of the recording, and who died several months later.

== Reception ==
Professional ratings
Review scores
Source	Rating
All About Jazz	3.5/5 stars
AllMusic	4.5/5 stars
The Christian Science Monitor	A+
The Penguin Guide to Jazz Recordings	3/4 stars
Tom Hull – on the Web	A−

In a review for AllMusic, Steve Leggett called the album "remarkable," and wrote: "The show may have been a swan song for Lowe, but it is still full of a delightful, gentle joy, and the music is uplifting, natural and -- in the best sense -- logical. Lowe on his deathbed asked Bang to make sure this performance was released. One can hear why. It's magnificent."

The authors of The Penguin Guide to Jazz Recordings noted that, despite Lowe's health issues, "he's still a formidable player and his work... is exemplary." They singled out "At Play in the Fields of the Lord" for praise, stating that it "really does draw a gentle line under Lowe's often overlooked talent, as well as offering a further reminder of what a stunningly good player Bang can be."

Scott Verrastro of JazzTimes commented: "joy seems to be the set's strongest emotion: The ensemble clearly overcame the impending demise of Lowe and performed each song with utmost conviction and sympathy, leaving a perfect legacy for Lowe."

The Christian Science Monitor's Norman Weinstein stated that Bang and Lowe "transmute war trauma into searing and searching improvised music heavily colored by various global folk music traditions," and remarked: "This is gritty jazz – bluesy, urgent, and yet polished and hopeful."

In an article for All About Jazz, Jeff Stockton wrote: "this concert is best experienced as a whole, letting each musician work his way into his improvisation, then marveling at the way his band mates bring the tunes back into focus. In Grand Rapids, the Billy Bang Quintet was at the height of their powers. Frank Lowe is sorely missed." AAJ's Mark Saleski suggested that Lowe "knew that something special happened that night in 2003," and commented: "The jazz world misses Frank Lowe but at least we have this document of the man's creative powers."

== Track listing ==
1. "Silent Observation" (Billy Bang) – 18:08
2. "Nothing But Love" (Frank Lowe) – 10:01
3. "Dark Silhouette" (Billy Bang) – 24:00
4. "At Play in the Fields of the Lord" (Billy Bang) – 13:18

== Personnel ==
- Billy Bang – violin
- Frank Lowe – tenor sax
- Andrew Bemkey – piano
- Todd Nicholson – double bass
- Tatsuya Nakatani – drums
