= Daily Bread (Charles Gayle album) =

Studio album by Charles Gayle
- Released: 1998
- Recorded: October 25, 26 and 28, 1995
- Genre: Jazz
- Length: 76:07
- Label: Black Saint
- Producer: Flavio Bonandrini

Charles Gayle chronology
Testaments (1995)	Daily Bread (1998)	Delivered (1997)

Daily Bread is an album by American jazz saxophonist Charles Gayle featuring performances recorded in 1995 for the Italian Black Saint label.

== Reception ==
Professional ratings
Review scores
Source	Rating
AllMusic	4/5 stars
The Penguin Guide to Jazz Recordings	3.5/4 stars

The AllMusic review by Scott Yanow awarded the album 4 stars stating "Charles Gayle takes some heartfelt solos on piano and fiddles up a storm on viola, but it is his very intense tenor solos that (as one would expect) leave the biggest impression. To use a cliché, this powerful recording is not for the faint-hearted!".

The authors of the Penguin Guide to Jazz Recordings called the album "another great one," and commented: "Gayle's doubling lends context and breadth, and when all four men are playing strings... the results turn string quartet music inside out. 'Earthly Things' and 'Shout Merrily' are terrific group performances as well as signature Gayle."

== Track listing ==
All compositions by Charles Gayle

1. "This Cup" - 10:00
2. "Our Sins" - 6:42
3. "Inner Joy" - 7:10
4. "Drink" - 3:57
5. "Earthly Things" - 10:41
6. "Watch" - 5:33
7. "Rest Awhile" - 8:01
8. "Offering to Christ" - 15:41
9. "Shout Merrily" - 8:22
  - Recorded at East Side Sound in New York City on October 25, 26 and 28, 1995

== Personnel ==
- Charles Gayle - tenor saxophone, bass clarinet, viola, piano
- William Parker - cello, piano
- Wilber Morris - bass
- Michael Wimberly - drums, violin
