= Configuration (album) =

Live album by Sirone and Billy Bang
- Released: 2005
- Recorded: November 9, 2004
- Studio: CBGB's Gallery, New York City
- Genre: Free jazz
- Label: Silkheart Records; SHCD 155

Sirone chronology
Live (2005)	Configuration (2005)

Billy Bang chronology
Vietnam: Reflections (2005)	Configuration (2005)	Above & Beyond: An Evening in Grand Rapids (2007)

Configuration is a live album by bassist Sirone and violinist Billy Bang, recorded in November, 2004, at CBGB's Gallery in New York City, and released in 2005 by Silkheart Records. On the album, the musicians are joined by the members of the Sirone Bang Ensemble: saxophonist Charles Gayle and drummer Tyshawn Sorey.

== Reception ==
Professional ratings
Review scores
Source	Rating
The Penguin Guide to Jazz	3/4 stars
Tom Hull – on the Web	A−

The authors of the Penguin Guide to Jazz Recordings wrote: "The interplay between Bang and Sirone is as fascinating as you'd expect given their shared and several experience and the closeness of their instruments." They praised the contribution of Sorey, who was 22 at the time of the recording, stating that, by the second track, he gives "the three veterans something to think about." They concluded: "A fine set and overdue recognition of one of the key bassists of recent times."

In an article for The Village Voice, Tom Hull wrote that the album "rocks so hard that saxophonist Charles Gayle comes off like an r&b honker." On TomHull.com, he commented: "the pairing of the Revolutionary Ensemble bassist with violinist Bang was meant to generate lots of friction, and for good measure they brought along Charles Gayle, who for once blows within the limits of his name, as opposed to his usual hurricane force. Perhaps in honor of the venue, there's a certain rockishness to their approach... Don't know where they found drummer Tyshawn Sorey, but he has a blast."

Dan Warburton, writing for Paris Transatlantic, remarked: "from the sound of it all four gents are happy to be down on the Bowery... 'Freedom Flexibility' swings wickedly..., and Sirone's 'We Are Not Alone, But We Are Few' joins a line of melancholy free jazz ballads stretching back to Ornette's Town Hall Concert. And as the set progresses it gets better and better: Bang's solo on 'I Remember Albert' might be the most powerful thing he's ever released, the interplay between the musicians on the following 'Notre Dame De La Garde' is magnificent, and things get so seriously funky on the closing title track you might be forgiven for thinking it was called Conflagration."

In a review for One Final Note, Matthew Sumera wrote: "On Configuration, three veterans of free jazz... join together for a romp through freebop, the blues, funk, and Ayleresque balladry full of distinct pathos. They are immeasurably helped along by young drummer Tyshawn Sorey... The Sirone Bang Ensemble's first album is full of surprises from all, and is probably most exciting for fans of Bang, who clearly enjoys himself throughout."

All About Jazz writer Germein Linares called "Jupiter's Future" "fun and unexpected," stating that it "allows individual powers to shine on a loosely structured template." He noted that "the ensemble clearly enjoys density, rhythms of various details, and haphazard textures," but cautioned that these elements "merely sound frantic." AAJ's Jeff Stockton stated that Bang and Gayle "come at their solos at an angle, as if they want to chop the melody down before pushing it upright again," and remarked: "Sirone may get top billing with Bang, but Gayle and his horn challenge the violinist for musical supremacy."

== Track listing ==
1. "Jupiter's Future" (Bang) – 15:51
2. "Freedom Flexibility" (Bang) – 6:06
3. "We Are Not Alone But We Are Few" (Sirone) – 14:05
4. "I Remember Albert" (Sirone) – 13:56
5. "Notre Dame de la Garde" (Bang) – 7:28
6. "Configuration" (Sirone) – 8:34

== Personnel ==
- Charles Gayle – alto saxophone, tenor saxophone
- Billy Bang – violin
- Sirone – bass
- Tyshawn Sorey – drums
