= Biombos =

Studio album by Telectu
- Released: 1994
- Recorded: 1994
- Genre: Avant-garde music, jazz fusion, electronica
- Label: China Record Company

Biombos is an album by the artist Telectu, released on the Chinese state-owned record company China Record Corporation in 1994.

== Track listing ==
1. Beijing Suite -20:58
2. Slow Fox -7:40
3. Waltz -8:13
4. Cherry Fox -8:18
5. Slow Fox -9:01
6. Trane Fox -5:53
7. Sasa Fox -6:29
8. Waltz -4:55
9. Imperial Bird Whistles -1:01
