= The October Revolution (album) =

1996 live album dedicated to Bill Dixon

Live album by Rashied Ali, Borah Bergman, Joe McPhee, Wilber Morris, and the Myra Melford Trio
- Released: 1996
- Recorded: October 22, 1994
- Venue: Fez Room under the Time Cafe, New York City
- Genre: Free jazz
- Length: 1:13:41
- Label: Evidence Music; ECD 22166-2
- Producer: John F. Szwed, Matthew Szwed

Rashied Ali chronology
Island Universe (1994)	The October Revolution (1996)	Live (1997)

The October Revolution is a live album that documents a concert celebrating the 30th anniversary of the 1964 music festival known as the October Revolution in Jazz. It contains two long tracks, dedicated to composer, trumpeter, and festival organizer Bill Dixon, by a quartet that features drummer Rashied Ali (a participant in the festival), pianist Borah Bergman, saxophonist Joe McPhee, and bassist Wilber Morris, plus a single short track featuring the Myra Melford Trio, led by pianist Melford, and featuring bassist Lindsey Horner and drummer Tom Rainey. (Saxophonist Zane Massey and his trio also performed at the event, but the music was not included due to technical problems.) The album was recorded on October 22, 1994, at the Fez Room under the Time Cafe in New York City, and was released in 1996 by Evidence Music.

== Reception ==
Professional ratings
Review scores
Source	Rating
AllMusic	4/5 stars
The Penguin Guide to Jazz	2.5/4 stars
The Encyclopedia of Popular Music	3/5 stars
Tom Hull – on the Web	B+

In a review for AllMusic, Scott Yanow called the quartet piece "quite coherent, full of energy, and worth a few listens" despite the fact that the four musicians had not played together prior to the performance. He commented: "It is a pity that Dixon himself, along with more of the original players, were not at this concert, but the music does have its exciting moments."

The authors of The Penguin Guide to Jazz Recordings stated that Melford's contribution is "crisp, responsive, and engagingly short," while the quartet tracks "ramble portentously."

Bill Shoemaker of JazzTimes described Melford's track as a "poignant, blues-drenched, space-sensitive piece" that "taps both the pianist's strengths as a balladeer and her strong rapport" with her sidemen. Regarding "For Bill Dixon I," he noted "Morris' skitterish bow effects, Bergman's swirling piano clusters and McPhee's spattered flugelhorn fragments" leading to a "culminating well-sculpted ensemble statement," while part II ends with "the aural equivalent of watching a hurricane disappear on a time-elapsed weather map."

Writing for Metroactive, Nicky Baxter called the album "an experience not to be missed... like hearing music for the first time." He praised McPhee's saxophone work, stating that he "refuses to follow trends, and his playing is as fresh and inventive as ever," spitting out "jagged shards here, honey-coated laconic droplets there." He also called Morris's bass playing "a marvel to hear," and noted "the vast range of emotions he summons from his instrument."

== Track listing ==
1. "For Bill Dixon I" (Ali/Bergman/McPhee/Morris) – 40:54
2. "The Death of Danny Love" (Butch Morris) – 7:34
3. "For Bill Dixon II" (Ali/Bergman/McPhee/Morris) – 25:13

== Personnel ==
- Joe McPhee – flugelhorn, tenor saxophone (tracks 1 and 3)
- Borah Bergman – piano (tracks 1 and 3)
- Wilber Morris – bass (tracks 1 and 3)
- Rashied Ali – drums (tracks 1 and 3)
- Myra Melford – piano (track 2)
- Lindsey Horner – bass (track 2)
- Tom Rainey – drums (track 2)
