= Borah Bergman =

American pianist

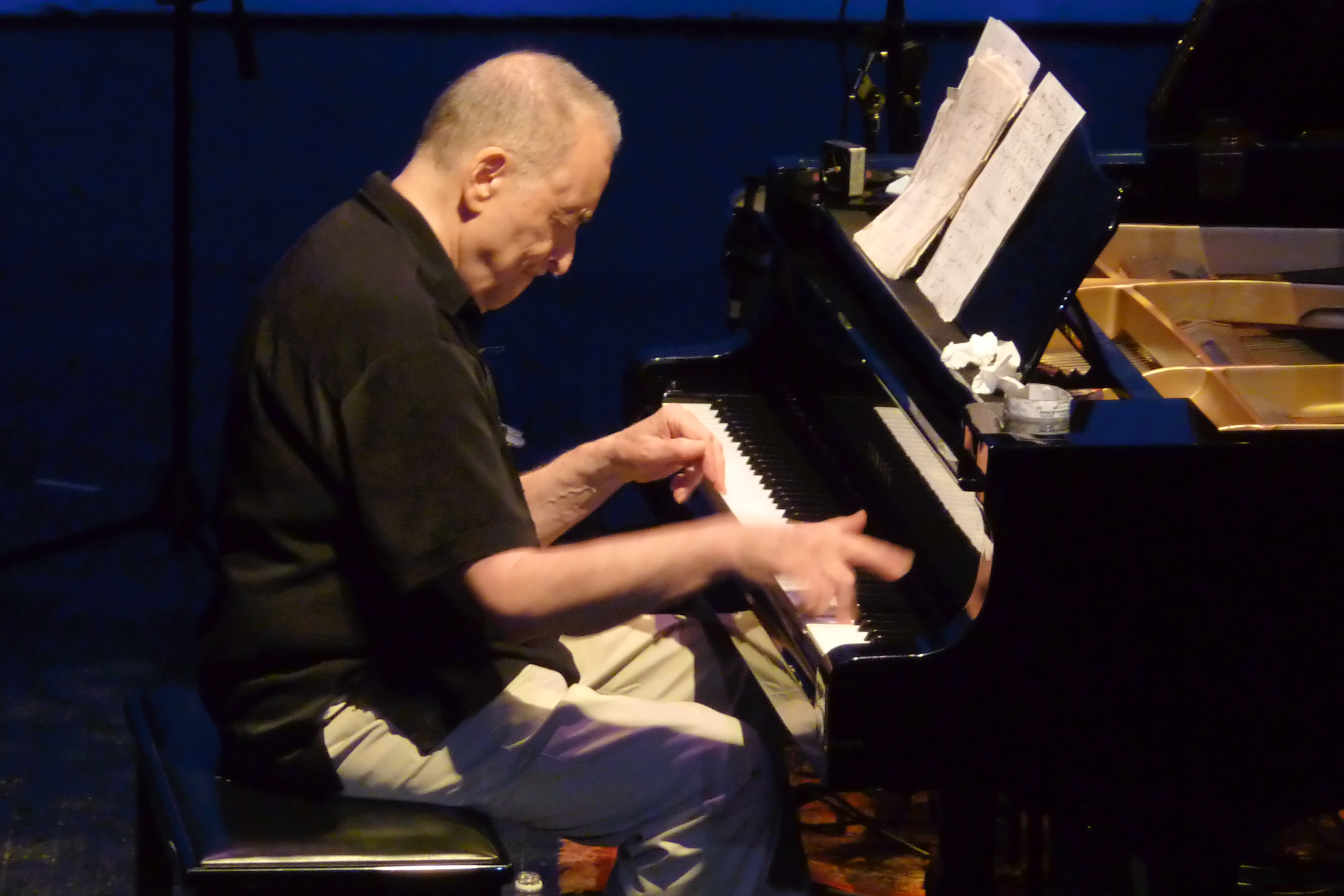
- Bergman playing the piano in 2010

Background information
- Born: December 13, 1926; Brooklyn, New York, U.S.
- Died: October 18, 2012 (aged 85) New York, U.S.
- Genres: Free jazz
- Occupation: Musician
- Instrument: Piano
- Years active: 1975–2012

Borah Bergman (December 13, 1926 – October 18, 2012) was an American free jazz pianist.

== Training and influences ==
Bergman was born in Brooklyn to Russian-Jewish immigrant parents. His grandfather Meir Pergamenick was a cantor. Accounts of when he began to learn the piano vary: some assert that he learned clarinet as a child and did not commence his piano studies until adulthood; others, that he had piano lessons from a young age; one of his own accounts is that he took piano lessons as a child, then changed to clarinet, before returning to piano after being discharged from the army. As an adult, he developed his left hand playing to the point where he became essentially ambidextrous as a pianist, and could play equally fast in both hands, and they could act completely independently of each other; Bergman himself preferred the term "ambi-ideation" to "ambidextrous", as it conveyed the added ability to express ideas achieved when both hands were equal. Bergman cited Earl Hines, Bud Powell, and Lennie Tristano as formative influences, although his own style was based on free improvisation rather than song form. Commenting on his other influences, Bergman said that "I was influenced strongly by Ornette Coleman... I was also very influenced by chamber music and Bach and Dixieland or New Orleans, where all of the instruments were playing contrapuntally and polyphonically. So I figured I'd like to do it myself". He died in New York in 2012.

== Performance and recordings ==
Until the 1970s he played little in public, concentrating on private practice and his work as a school teacher. He recorded four albums as a soloist, most notably on the European label Soul Note, before embarking on duo and trio albums from the 1990s. A small number of solo and quartet albums were also released from the mid-1990s. The style for which he is best known is described in The Penguin guide to jazz recordings: "His astonishing solo performances recall the 'two pianists' illusion associated with Art Tatum, though in a more fragmentary and disorderly sound-world".

== Discography ==
=== As leader/co-leader ===
Year recorded	Title	Label	Personnel/Notes
1975?	Discovery	Chiaroscuro	Solo piano
1976?	Bursts of Joy	Chiaroscuro	Solo piano
1983	A New Frontier	Soul Note	Solo piano
1984	Upside Down Visions	Soul Note	Solo piano
1990	The Fire Tale	Soul Note	Duo, with Evan Parker (soprano sax)
1992	Inversions	Muworks	Duo, with Thomas Chapin (alto sax, saxello)
1992	The Human Factor	Soul Note	Duo, with Andrew Cyrille (drums)
1994	First Meeting	Knitting Factory	Most tracks duo, with Roscoe Mitchell (alto sax, soprano sax); some tracks trio, with Thomas Buckner (vocals) added
1994	The October Revolution	Evidence	Quartet, with Joe McPhee (tenor saxophone, flugelhorn), Wilber Morris (bass), Rashied Ali (drums); in concert
1994–95	The Italian Concert	Soul Note	Duo, with Roscoe Mitchell (alto sax, soprano sax)
1995	Reflections on Ornette Coleman and the Stone House	Soul Note	Duo, with Hamid Drake (drums)
1996	Eight By Three	Mixtery	Trio, with Anthony Braxton and Peter Brötzmann (reeds)
1996	Monks	some real music	Trio, with Wilber Morris and Sunny Murray
1996	Geometry	Leo	Duo, with Ivo Perelman (tenor sax)
1996	Blue Zoo	Konnex	Trio, with Thomas Borgmann (tenor sax), Peter Brötzmann (alto sax, tarogato)
1996	Ride into the Blue	Konnex	Trio, with Thomas Borgmann (tenor sax), Peter Brötzmann (alto sax, tarogato)
1996	Left	Not Two	Trio, with Peter Brötzmann (tenor sax, clarinet, tarogato), Frode Gjerstad (alto sax)
1996–97	Exhilaration	Soul Note	Trio, with Peter Brötzmann (alto sax), Andrew Cyrille (drums)
1997?	Ikosa Mura	Cadence	with Frode Gjerstad, Bobby Bradford and Pheeroan akLaff
1997	A New Organization	Soul Note	Duo, with Oliver Lake (alto sax); in concert
1997	Toronto 1997	Boxholder	Duo, with Thomas Chapin (sax, flute)
2000	The River of Sounds	Boxholder	Trio, with Conny Bauer (trombone), Mat Maneri (violin)
2001	Meditations for Piano	Tzadik	Solo piano
2002	The Double Idea	Boxholder	Solo piano
2003	The Mahout	Slam	Trio, with George Haslam (baritone sax, tarogato), Paul Hession (drums)
2002	Rivers in Time	FMR	Most tracks duo, with Frode Gjerstad (sax, clarinet); some tracks solo piano; one track Gjerstad solo
2003	Acts of Love	Mutable Music	Trio, with Lol Coxhill (soprano sax), Paul Hession (drums)
2007	One More Time	Silta	Duo, with Giorgio Dini (bass)
2007	Live at Tortona	Mutable Music	Duo, with Stefano Pastor (violin); in concert
2008	Luminescence	Tzadik	Most tracks trio, with Greg Cohen (bass), Kenny Wollesen (drums); one track quartet, with John Zorn (alto sax) added
