= Evil Metal =

Telectu

Studio album by Telectu
- Released: 1992
- Recorded: 1989
- Genre: Avant-garde music, electronica
- Length: 1h 14m
- Label: Area Total
- Producer: Telectu, Carlos Cabral

Evil Metal is an album released on Area Total in 1992 by Telectu featuring Elliott Sharp.

== Track listing ==
1. Untitled -4:15
2. Untitled -5:15
3. Untitled -2:20
4. Untitled -6:00
5. Untitled -3:09
6. Untitled -8:09
7. Untitled -5:43
8. Untitled -3:52
9. Untitled -18:46
10. Untitled -5:08
11. Untitled (with Elliott Sharp)-5:24
12. Untitled (with Elliott Sharp)-5:20

== Personnel ==
- Jorge Lima Barreto: Workstations W30 and ML, breath controllers Casio e EWI 200, Synthetiser JD800, Wave Station Korg
- Vitor Rua: Multimedia guitar, Stick, Yamaha Zylo, Yamaha Computer Electronics
- Elliott Sharp: Doubleneck Guitarbass, Soprano Sax (tracks 10 and 11).
