= Distinction Without a Difference (album) =

Live album by Billy Bang
- Released: 1980
- Recorded: August 12, 1979
- Venue: The Gaku Gallery, New York City
- Genre: Free jazz
- Label: Hat Hut; 1R04; Corbett vs. Dempsey; CVSDCD035
- Producer: Werner X. Uehlinger (original release); John Corbett (reissue)

Billy Bang chronology
Sweet Space (1979)	Distinction Without a Difference (1980)	Changing Seasons (1981)

Distinction Without a Difference is a live solo album by violinist Billy Bang. It was recorded on August 12, 1979, at the Gaku Gallery in New York City, and was released on vinyl in 1980 by Hat Hut Records. In 2017, the Corbett vs. Dempsey label reissued the album in remastered form on CD, with an additional track from the New York concert plus four tracks that were recorded on October 29, 1978, in Tilberg, Netherlands.

== Reception ==
Professional ratings
Review scores
Source	Rating
AllMusic	3/5 stars
The Rolling Stone Jazz Record Guide	3/5 stars

Jazz Journal's Matthew Bateson called the album "very impressive" and "Bang's most mature recording to date." He commented: "The tricky double stopping passages closing 'Distinction', and the structural logic of his playing on 'Loweski'... reveal a profound improvisor whose fluent technique never impedes true creative thought. Furthermore, the magically joyful variations on the familiar tune of 'Skip to My Lou' are not only irresistible fun, but also confirmation of his harmonic audacity."

In a review for Point of Departure, Bill Shoemaker stated that Bang is "out and earthy at the same time, grounding exploratory compositional contours with a fiddler's grit while bringing an off-center slant to more conventional blowing vehicles."

Derek Taylor of Dusted Magazine praised the first track, calling it "an arresting opener steeped in breath-taking bow effects, high velocity glissandi and whistling harmonics," and commenting: "Bang's strings positively sing in creating an aural action painting resplendent in emotional tonal colors ranging from ecstasy to sorrow."

Writing for JazzWord regarding the 207 CD release, Ken Waxman described the music as "animated and vigorous... a mixture of sentiment and strength," and remarked: "Later on Bang would record more profound, more outside and more swinging dates. But this welcome reissue demonstrates his ideas near his career beginning and hints at why his work was eventually so profound."

The New York City Jazz Record's Thomas Conrad noted that, on the album, "the listener can focus, without distraction, on the full range of Bang's special voice and improvisational language." He wrote: "He could make your hair stand on end with abrasiveness, but he could also stream pure silver fluidity. His ideas were jagged and fresh and fearlessly juxtaposed according to his own proprietary logic."

== Original LP track listing ==
1. "Improvisation For Sweet Space" (Billy Bang) – 5:45
2. "Loweski" (Billy Bang) – 8:00
3. "Part of a Distinction Without a Difference" (Billy Bang) – 3:45
4. "Theme for Masters" (Billy Bang) – 9:50
5. "Sometime Later" (Billy Bang) – 8:00
6. "Skip to My Lou" (Traditional) – 4:00
- Recorded at the Gaku Gallery in New York City on August 12, 1979.

== CD reissue track listing ==
1. "Improvisation for Sweet Space" (Billy Bang) – 5:39
2. "Loweski" (Billy Bang) – 8:01
3. "Part of a Distinction Without a Difference" (Billy Bang) – 3:46
4. "Theme for Masters" (Billy Bang) – 9:51
5. "Sometime Later" (Billy Bang) – 8:02
6. "Skip to My Lou" (Traditional) – 4:01
7. "Prana" (William Parker) – 8:13
8. "Echo Vamp" (Billy Bang) – 6:53
9. "Subway Ride with Giuseppi Logan" (Billy Bang) – 8:40
10. "A Pebble is a Small Rock" (Billy Bang) – 7:12
11. "Fiddle in the Floodlight" (Billy Bang) – 6:35
- Tracks 1–6 and 10 were recorded at the Gaku Gallery in New York City on August 12, 1979. Tracks 7–9 and 11 were recorded in Tilberg, Netherlands on October 29, 1978.

== Personnel ==
- Billy Bang – violin
