= Bendito of Santa Cruz =

Studio album by Ivo Perelman
- Released: 1997
- Recorded: January 1996
- Studios: Systems Two, Brooklyn
- Genre: Jazz
- Length: 50:39
- Label: Cadence Jazz Records
- Producer: Ivo Perelman

Ivo Perelman chronology
Cama de Terra (1996)	Bendito of Santa Cruz (1997)	Sad Life (1997)

Bendito of Santa Cruz is an album by the Brazilian jazz saxophonist Ivo Perelman with the pianist Matthew Shipp, recorded in 1996 and released on Cadence Jazz Records. Most of the tunes are Brazilian folk songs arranged and adapted by Perelman.

== Reception ==
Professional ratings
Review scores
Source	Rating
AllMusic	4.5/5 stars
The Penguin Guide to Jazz	3/4 stars

In his review for AllMusic, Alex Henderson notes that "melody is a high priority on this session, and Perelman makes a point of stating recognizable melodies before venturing 'outside' for some very intense and explosive improvising."

== Track listing ==
All compositions are Brazilian folk songs except where noted.

1. "Bendito of Santa Cruz take 1" – 1:42
2. "Macumba" – 9:27
3. "Anglo" (Ivo Perelman) – 7:22
4. "Roses" – 6:41
5. "Ze do Vale" – 5:39
6. "Cego" – 4:43
7. "Cana Fita" – 4:17
8. "Bandeirantes" (Ivo Perelman) – 6:02
9. "The Lion" (Ivo Perelman) – 3:08
10. "Bendito of Santa Cruz take 2" – 1:38

== Personnel ==
- Ivo Perelman – tenor sax
- Matthew Shipp – piano
