= ConcertOto =

Live album by Marilyn Crispell, Eddie Prévost, and Harrison Smith
- Released: 2021
- Recorded: November 7, 2012
- Studio: Cafe Oto, London
- Genre: Jazz
- Label: Matchless Recordings; MRCD104

ConcertOto is a live album by pianist Marilyn Crispell, drummer Eddie Prévost, and saxophonist and clarinetist Harrison Smith. It was recorded on November 7, 2012, at Cafe Oto in London, and was released in 2021 by Matchless Recordings.

== Reception ==
Professional ratings
Review scores
Source	Rating
All About Jazz	4.5/5 stars
Jazz Journal	3/5 stars

In a review for All About Jazz, John Eyles wrote: "the playing of all three players clearly reveals their histories playing jazz, free or otherwise... The players all inject great variety into the music they play... nothing ever sounds premeditated or cued in; instead, a dynamic balance is maintained between the three players, with each one being featured and contributing equally... this album is an object lesson in the art of the improviser and should be required listening for anyone who aspires to be an improvising musician."

Tyran Grillo, writing for The New York City Jazz Record, praised the "magical kind of coalescence that only musicians who truly listen to one another can achieve," and commented: "Crispell is a master collage artist... Prévost is a fabulous player, never losing track of the inner thread even when he severs it while Smith treats time as a physical dimension."

Jazz Journal's Nic Jones stated: "The music happens in the moments, as do the individual musicians' silences and their responses to the input of the others. As such the level of spontaneity is high and the resulting music is all the more stimulating for that."

In an article for London Jazz News, Tony Dudley-Evans remarked: "This is the gentler, more contemplative side of improvised music – with some exquisite interplay between piano and saxophones, and some great swinging drumming, commenting on and punctuating the piano and saxophone in a free style... All this makes for a fine recording."

== Track listing ==
1. "An Exploratory Introduction" – 7:54
2. "Main Part 1" – 29:05
3. "A Meditative Interlude" – 4:22
4. "Main Part 2" – 26:05
5. "Finale" – 8:43

== Personnel ==
- Marilyn Crispell – piano
- Harrison Smith – bass clarinet, saxophones
- Eddie Prévost – drums
