= Untitled Gift =

Studio album by Billy Bang
- Released: 1982
- Recorded: February 7, 1982
- Studio: OAO Studio, Brooklyn, New York
- Genre: Free jazz
- Label: Anima Productions; 3BG9
- Producer: Billy Bang

Billy Bang chronology
Rainbow Gladiator (1981)	Untitled Gift (1982)	Invitation (1982)

Untitled Gift is an album by violinist Billy Bang. It was recorded on February 7, 1982, at OAO Studio in Brooklyn, New York, and was released on vinyl later that year by Anima Productions. On the album, Bang is joined by trumpeter Don Cherry, double bassist Wilber Morris, and drummer Dennis Charles. The recording features three Bang originals plus one composition by Cherry and two by Ornette Coleman. In 2004, the 8th Harmonic Breakdown label reissued the album on CD along with Bang's 1979 release Sweet Space on the compilation Sweet Space/Untitled Gift.

== Reception ==
Professional ratings
Review scores
Source	Rating
All About Jazz (reissue)	5/5 stars
The Penguin Guide to Jazz (reissue)	3.5/4 stars
Tom Hull – on the Web (reissue)	A−
The Virgin Encyclopedia of Jazz	3/5 stars

In a review for All About Jazz, Rex Butters wrote: "Charles spins a strong web of invisible rhythms as Morris drops chewy subharmonic power. Cherry bristles with brilliance in a quartet apparently electrified by their interplay." Regarding the 2004 reissue, AAJ's Terrell Kent Holmes stated that it "will enhance Bang's stature as one of the most vital and original voices on the scene today."

Critic Tom Hull awarded the reissue a grade of "A−", calling it "exhilarating," and commenting: "Bang squares off with Don Cherry on an Ornette-centered song list, one of the most exciting encounters of either's career."

One Final Note's Derek Taylor described the music as "affirming and accomplished," and remarked: "Cherry's voice-like inflection on pocket trumpet proves an ideal match for the sliding speech-like glisses of Bang's bow... The concord shared by Morris and Charles makes the meeting all that sweeter and the drummer in particular shines through a permeable lattice of muscular tom-driven rhythms."

== Track listing ==
1. "Echovamp 1678" (Billy Bang) – 12:15
2. "Night Sequence" (Ornette Coleman) – 5:50
3. "The Kora Song" (Don Cherry) – 5:48
4. "Maat" (Billy Bang) – 11:40
5. "Levitation for Santana" (Billy Bang) – 4:10
6. "Focus on Sanity" (Ornette Coleman) – 4:20

== Personnel ==
- Billy Bang – violin, flute, bells, congas
- Don Cherry – pocket trumpet, flute, bells
- Wilber Morris – double bass
- Dennis Charles – drums
