= Cama de Terra =

Studio album by Ivo Perelman
- Released: 1996
- Recorded: June 6, 1996
- Studio: Systems Two, Brooklyn
- Genre: Jazz
- Length: 53:57
- Label: Homestead
- Producer: Ivo Perelman, Steven Joerg

Ivo Perelman chronology
| Blue Monk Variations (1996) | Cama de Terra (1996) | Bendito of Santa Cruz (1997) |

Cama de Terra is an album by the Brazilian jazz saxophonist Ivo Perelman, recorded in 1996 and released on Homestead. He leads a trio with pianist Matthew Shipp and bassist William Parker. Perelman and Shipp played previously on the duo album Bendito of Santa Cruz. The album marks the final release on Homestead before the record label dissolved in 1996.

== Reception ==
Professional ratings
Review scores
| Source | Rating |
|---|---|
| AllMusic | 4/5 stars |
| The Penguin Guide to Jazz | 3/4 stars |

In his review for AllMusic, Alex Henderson notes: "In the mid- to late 1990s, Ivo Perelman was recording frequently and freelancing for more than a few independent labels. So many trips to the studio might have been overkill for less interesting players, but Perelman had so much to say musically that it was good to see him being extensively documented."

== Track listing ==
All compositions by Ivo Perelman

1. "Soundcheck" - 0:48
2. "One Converse" - 2:58
3. "To Another" - 4:38
4. "Nho Quim" - 8:51
5. "Spiral" - 5:38
6. "Adriana" - 3:54
7. "Groundswell Descent" - 4:55
8. "Dedos" - 3:51
9. "Elephants Have Brains" - 2:40
10. "Cama de Terra" - 9:24
11. "The Dark of Day" - 6:20

== Personnel ==
- Ivo Perelman - tenor sax
- Matthew Shipp - piano
- William Parker - bass
