= Geometry (disambiguation) =

Geometry is a branch of mathematics dealing with spatial relationships.

Geometry or geometric may also refer to:

- Geometric distribution of probability theory and statistics
- Geometric series, a mathematical series with a constant ratio between successive terms
- Geometrically (algebraic geometry), a property of a variety or scheme that holds after base change to a geometric point

== Music ==
- Geometry (Robert Rich album), a 1991 album by American musician Robert Rich
- Geometry (Ivo Perelman album), a 1997 album by Brazilian saxophonist Ivo Perelman
- Geometry (Jega album), a 2000 album by English musician Jega

== Other uses ==
- Geometric art, a phase of ancient Greek art
- Geometric (typeface classification), a class of sans-serif typeface styles
- Geely Geometry, Chinese car brand manufactured by Geely
- "Geometry", a Series G episode of the television series QI (2010)
- Gia Metric, Canadian drag queen
