= Ivo Perelman =

Brazilian free jazz saxophonist (born 1961)

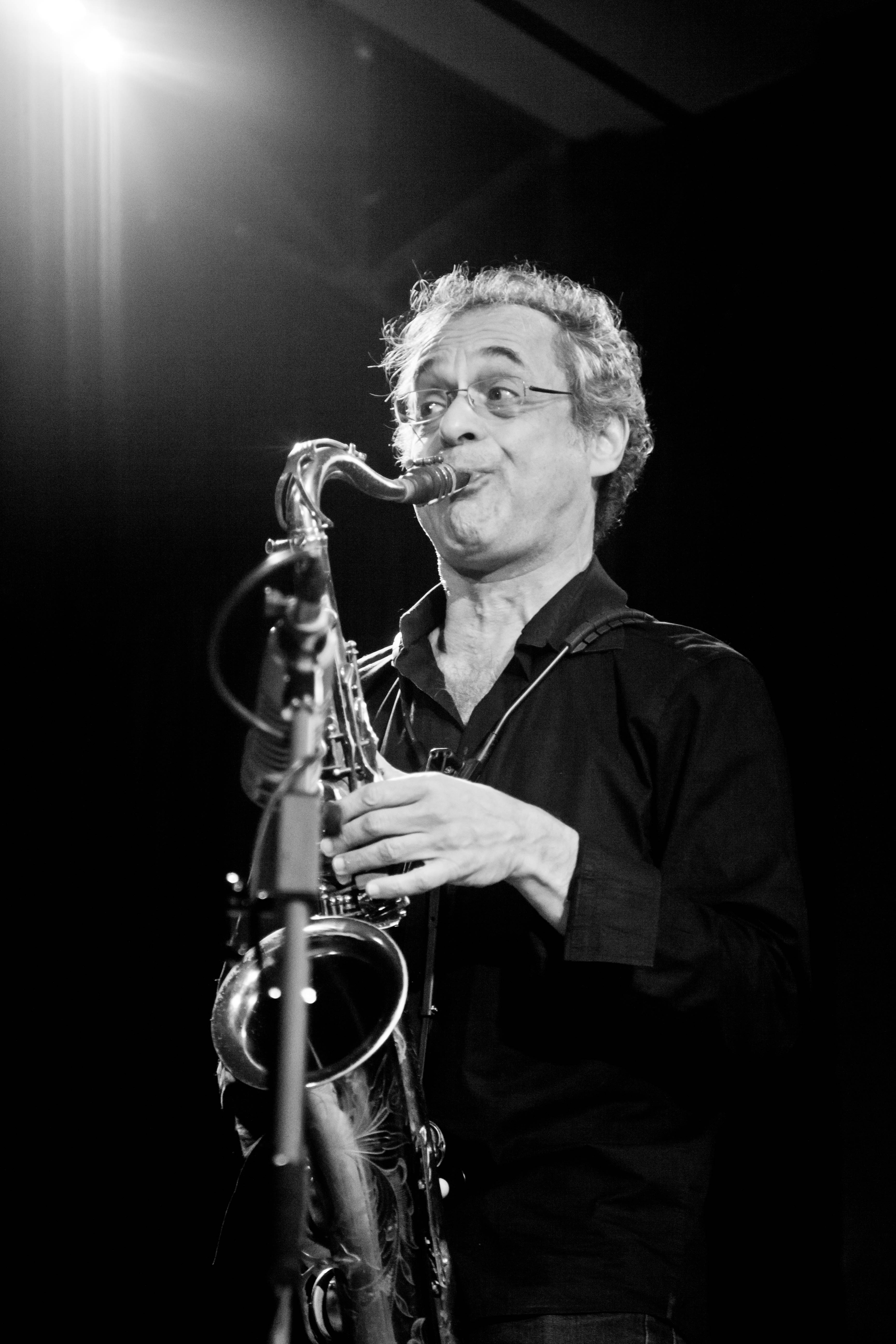

Background information
- Born: January 12, 1961 (age 64); São Paulo, Brazil
- Genres: Jazz
- Occupation: Musician
- Instrument: Saxophone
- Years active: 1980s–present
- Labels: Leo, Ibeji, Setola di Maiale
- Website: ivoperelman.com

Ivo Perelman (born January 12, 1961) is a Brazilian free jazz saxophonist born in São Paulo.

== Career ==
In his youth, Perelman learned to play guitar, cello, clarinet, trombone, and piano, concentrating on tenor sax since age 19. He attended the Berklee College of Music for one semester and then dropped out, moving to Los Angeles in 1986. Perelman released his first album in 1989, which featured Peter Erskine, John Patitucci, Airto Moreira, Eliane Elias, and Flora Purim as guests. After the release of his first album he moved to New York City. Perelman has released many albums since then for a number of different labels, and has played with Dominic Duval, Borah Bergman, Rashied Ali, Jay Rosen, Marilyn Crispell, Matthew Shipp, Paul Bley, Don Pullen, Fred Hopkins, Andrew Cyrille, Joanne Brackeen, Mark Helias, Billy Hart, Mino Cinelu, Nana Vasconcelos, Reggie Workman, William Parker, Louis Sclavis, John Wolf Brennan, Elton Dean, and Joe Morris.

He founded Ibeji Records in 1994 to record his own work.

== Discography ==
- Ivo (ITM, 1989)
- The Children of Ibeji (Enja, 1991)
- Man of the Forest (GM, 1994)
- Soccer Land (Ibeji, 1994)
- Tapeba Songs (Ibeji, 1995)
- Blue Monk Variations (Cadence, 1996)
- Cama de Terra (Homestead, 1996)
- Bendito of Santa Cruz (Cadence, 1997) with Matthew Shipp
- Sad Life (Leo, 1997)
- Perelman/Parker/Ali Live (Zero In, 1997)
- Geometry (Leo, 1997)
- Slaves of Job (CIMP, 1997)
- Revelation (CIMP, 1997)
- En Adir (Music & Arts, 1997)
- Sound Hierarchy (Music & Arts, 1997)
- Strings (Leo, 1997)
- Seeds, Visions, and Counterpoint (Leo, 1998)
- The Alexander Suite (Leo, 1998)
- Eye Listens (Boxholder, 1999)
- Sieiro (Leo, 1999)
- Brazilian Watercolor (Leo, 1999)
- The Hammer (Leo, 2000)
- The Seven Energies of the Universe (Leo, 2001)
- The Ventriloquist (Leo, 2002)
- Aquarela do Brazil (Atracao, 2002)
- Olha Ze (Rob, 2003)
- Suite for Helen F. (Boxholder, 2003)
- Black on White (Clean Feed, 2004)
- Introspection (Leo, 2006)
- Soul Calling (Cadence, 2006)
- Near to the Wild Heart (Not Two, 2010)
- Soulstorm (Clean Feed, 2010)
- The Apple in the Dark (Leo, 2010) with Gerry Hemingway
- The Hour of the Star (Leo, 2011) with Matthew Shipp, Joe Morris, & Gerald Cleaver
- Family Ties (Leo, 2012) with Joe Morris & Gerald Cleaver
- The Passion According to G.H. (Leo, 2012) with Sirius Quartet
- The Foreign Legion (Leo, 2012) with Matthew Shipp & Gerald Cleaver
- The Clairvoyant (Leo, 2012) with Matthew Shipp & Whit Dickey
- Living Jelly (Leo, 2012) with Joe Morris & Gerald Cleaver
- The Gift (Leo, 2012) with Matthew Shipp & Michael Bisio
- One (RareNoise, 2013) with Joe Morris & Balázs Pándi
- A Violent Dose of Anything (Leo, 2013) with Matthew Shipp & Mat Maneri
- Enigma (Leo, 2013) with Matthew Shipp, Whit Dickey, & Gerald Cleaver
- Serendipity (Leo, 2013) with Matthew Shipp, William Parker, & Gerald Cleaver
- The Edge (Leo, 2013) with Matthew Shipp, Michael Bisio, & Whit Dickey
- The Art of the Duet, Volume One (Leo, 2013) with Matthew Shipp
- Two Men Walking (Leo, 2014) with Mat Maneri
- Book of Sound (Leo, 2014) with Matthew Shipp & William Parker
- The Other Edge (Leo, 2014) with Matthew Shipp, Michael Bisio, & Whit Dickey
- Reverie (Leo, 2014) with Karl Berger
- Tenorhood (Leo, 2015) with Whit Dickey
- Callas (Leo, 2015) with Matthew Shipp
- Counterpoint (Leo, 2015) with Mat Maneri & Joe Morris
- Butterfly Whispers (Leo, 2015) with Matthew Shipp & Whit Dickey
- Villa Lobos Suite (Leo, 2015) with Mat Maneri & Tanya Kalmanovitch
- Complementary Colors (Leo, 2015) with Matthew Shipp
- Corpo (Leo, 2016) with Matthew Shipp
- Soul (Leo, 2016) with Matthew Shipp, Michael Bisio & Whit Dickey
- Blue (Leo, 2016) with Joe Morris
- The Hitchhiker (Leo, 2016) with Karl Berger
- Breaking Point (Leo, 2016) with Mat Maneri, Joe Morris & Gerald Cleaver
- The Art of the Improv Trio Volume 1 (Leo, 2016) with Karl Berger & Gerald Cleaver
- The Art of the Improv Trio Volume 2 (Leo, 2016) with Mat Maneri & Whit Dickey
- The Art of the Improv Trio Volume 3 (Leo, 2016) with Matthew Shipp & Gerald Cleaver
- The Art of the Improv Trio Volume 4 (Leo, 2016) with William Parker & Gerald Cleaver
- The Art of the Improv Trio Volume 5 (Leo, 2016) with Joe Morris & Gerald Cleaver
- The Art of the Improv Trio Volume 6 (Leo, 2016) with Joe Morris & Gerald Cleaver
- The Art of Perelman-Shipp Volume 1: Titan (Leo, 2017) with Matthew Shipp & William Parker
- The Art of Perelman-Shipp Volume 2: Tarvos (Leo, 2017) with Matthew Shipp & Bobby Kapp
- The Art of Perelman-Shipp Volume 3: Pandora (Leo, 2017) with Matthew Shipp, William Parker, & Whit Dickey
- The Art of Perelman-Shipp Volume 4: Hyperion (Leo, 2017) with Matthew Shipp, & Michael Bisio
- The Art of Perelman-Shipp Volume 5: Rhea (Leo, 2017) with Matthew Shipp, Michael Bisio, & Whit Dickey
- The Art of Perelman-Shipp Volume 6: Saturn (Leo, 2017) with Matthew Shipp
- The Art of Perelman-Shipp Volume 7: Dione (Leo, 2017) with Matthew Shipp & Andrew Cyrille
- Live in Brussels (Leo, 2017) with Matthew Shipp
- Live in Baltimore (Leo, 2017) with Matthew Shipp & Jeff Cosgrove
- Heptagon (Leo, 2017) with Matthew Shipp, William Parker, & Bobby Kapp
- Scalene (Leo, 2017) with Matthew Shipp & Joe Hertenstein
- Philosopher's Stone (Leo, 2017) with Matthew Shipp & Nate Wooley
- Octagon (Leo, 2017) with Nate Wooley, Brandon Lopez & Gerald Cleaver
- Oneness (Leo, 2018) with Matthew Shipp
- Efflorescence (Leo, 2019) with Matthew Shipp
- Ineffable Joy (ESP-Disk, 2019) with Matthew Shipp, William Parker, & Bobby Kapp
- Strung Out Threads (Setola di Maiale, 2020)
- Strings & Voices Project (Hundred Years Gallery, 2020) with David Leahy, Pascal Marzan, Marcio Mattos, Phil Minton, Jean-Michel van Schouwburg (de), Benedict Taylor, & Phil Wachsmann
- Dust Of Light / Ears Drawings Sounds (Setola di Maiale, 2020) with Pascal Marzan
- Fruition (ESP-Disk, 2022) with Matthew Shipp
