= Solo in Japan =

Live album by Charles Gayle
- Released: 1997
- Recorded: July 6–7, 1997
- Genre: Free jazz
- Label: P.S.F. Records
- Producer: Charles Gayle and Jun Tanaka

Solo in Japan is an album by American jazz saxophonist Charles Gayle recorded on July 6 and 7, 1997, for P.S.F. Records (PSFD-94).

== Reception ==
Professional ratings
Review scores
Source	Rating
The Penguin Guide to Jazz	4/4 stars

The authors of the Penguin Guide to Jazz Recordings awarded the album 4 stars.

Writing for Acoustic Levitation, Carlos Gómez included the album in a "Best of 2012" list. He commented, "Mr. Gayle's character 'Streets' plays in a pure and touching mood—solo pieces on tenor and soprano saxophone or piano. You don't need to think as you listen; go with your feelings."

== Track listing ==
1. "Come Ye"—7:59
2. "Walking Nearer"—15:01
3. "Praise God"—9:46
4. "Christ Changes You"—11:59
5. "Woe and Joy"—11:36

== Recordings ==
Track 1,2,3,4 was live-recorded at Jazz-Cafe Narcissus in Shinjuku, Tokyo, on July 6, 1997, and Track 5 was recorded at BarBer Fuji, not only a barber but a live house in Ageo-city, Saitama, on July 7, 1997. No voices or claps are heard, but these are the live recordings.

== Personnel ==
- Charles Gayle—tenor saxophone, soprano saxophone, piano
