= Touchin' on Trane =

Live album by Charles Gayle
- Released: 1993
- Recorded: October 31 and November 1, 1991
- Venue: Haus der Jungen Talente in Berlin, Germany
- Genre: Free jazz
- Length: 66:46
- Label: FMP
- Producer: Jost Gebers

Charles Gayle chronology
| Spirits Before (1988) | Touchin' on Trane (1993) | Repent (1992) |

By Any Means chronology
| Touchin' on Trane (1993) | Live at Crescendo (2008) |

Touchin' on Trane is a live album by American jazz saxophonist Charles Gayle, bassist William Parker, and percussionist Rashied Ali, featuring performances inspired by John Coltrane which were recorded in Germany in 1991 for the FMP label.

When on tour, the trio was billed under the name By Any Means; however, the album was released using the musicians' individual names for contractual reasons. The group would not release another recording until Live at Crescendo, issued by Ayler Records in 2008.

== Reception ==
Professional ratings
Review scores
| Source | Rating |
|---|---|
| AllMusic | 5/5 stars |
| Penguin Guide to Jazz | 👑 |
| The Encyclopedia of Popular Music | 4/5 stars |
| All About Jazz | 5/5 stars |

The AllMusic review by Brian Flota awarded the album five stars out of five, stating "This is Charles Gayle's most accessible work. Gayle's mastery of free jazz is blended with a more traditional compositional style of jazz on this disc... Gayle, bassist William Parker, and Ali don't copy Coltrane, but rather expand on his accomplishments. Without covering any songs, Touchin' on Trane is the greatest John Coltrane tribute album".

The authors of The Penguin Guide to Jazz called the album an "outright masterpiece" that "seems likely to be a central document in the free music of the decade," and identified it as part of their suggested "Core Collection" of essential jazz albums, awarding it a "Crown", signifying a recording that the authors "feel a special admiration or affection for".

Francis Lo Kee of All About Jazz called the album "one of the strongest of the '90s," and noted that Gayle "plays with the conviction and strength of a Coltrane or Rollins in their twenties and thirties."

Writing for Burning Ambulance, Phil Freeman commented: "What separates Touchin' On Trane from the pack is the mastery of the three players involved, and their ability to be taken out of themselves by the opportunity to work with the others... each man plays at the highest possible level, driving the others forward even as he reaches deep within himself to bring out something ineffable and awesome."

The authors of Jazz: The Rough Guide described the album as "Gayle at his best," and wrote: "the feel is more relaxed, less constantly aggressive than Gayle can be. He has too often recorded with musicians of far lower calibre than he, but Gayle is in good company with this rhythm team."

Author Ajay Heble remarked: "This is, to my mind, communal music making of the highest possible order... [Gayle's] widely varying timbres and non-tempered sounds... are a perfect match for... the formidable textural inventiveness and extended techniques" of Parker and "the liberating rhythmic drive" of Ali.

== Track listing ==
All compositions by Charles Gayle. William Parker & Rashied Ali

1. "Part A" – 14:41
2. "Part B" – 7:05
3. "Part C" – 12:28
4. "Part D" – 27:42
5. "Part E" – 4:48

== Personnel ==
- Charles Gayle – tenor saxophone
- William Parker – bass
- Rashied Ali – drums
