= Live at Crescendo =

Live album by By Any Means: Rashied Ali, Charles Gayle, and William Parker
- Released: 2008
- Recorded: October 19, 2007
- Venue: Club Crescendo, Norrköping, Sweden
- Genre: Free jazz
- Length: 1:44:57
- Label: Ayler Records aylCD-077/078
- Producer: Jan Ström

By Any Means chronology
| Touchin' on Trane (1993) | Live at Crescendo (2008) |

Live at Crescendo is a double-CD live album by the free jazz trio By Any Means, featuring drummer Rashied Ali, saxophonist Charles Gayle, and bassist William Parker. It was recorded on October 19, 2007, at Club Crescendo in Norrköping, Sweden, and was released in 2008 by Ayler Records.

== Reception ==
Professional ratings
Review scores
| Source | Rating |
|---|---|
| The Free Jazz Collective | 4/5 stars |
| Tom Hull – on the Web | B+ |

A reviewer for The Free Jazz Collective called the album "a strong performance," and wrote: "This is free jazz, free bop and free blues in its purest form, and a real joy from beginning to end... Parker and Ali are... at their best, both acting as full members of a trio."

Stewart Lee of The Times remarked: "Gayle's ferocious releases have, sometimes, been punctuated by gentler projects, and on the first disc here he is in unusually tuneful mood, before the second sees him cautiously unfurl his thunderous sheets of sound. Shut up! And listen."

Writing for All About Jazz, Jeff Stockton commented: "Ali combines his familiarity with the free jazz idiom and an intuitive feel for inside-out rhythms, while Parker's chunky riffing enables Gayle to ricochet his own runs off the bass notes as if opening a box of ping-pong balls. Gayle's tone is fractured, jagged, cubist, off-kilter, staggered, strangulated and feverish and together the band performs with a singularity of purpose that only top musicians can attain."

Point of Departure's Bill Shoemaker noted that the album is "remarkably rooted in blues, motif-driven heads and otherwise thematically based pieces," and stated: "the materials give Gayle well-grounded lenses through which his fiercely braying alto burns with precision, bringing his fluent use of bop and blues idioms into sharper focus than usual. This gives both Ali and Parker enough leeway to modulate the feel, but without stretching the materials or the form of a given piece beyond recognition."

In an article for JazzWord, Ken Waxman wrote: "the three continue to prove that time hasn't diminished their skills or original thought processes," and noted that "there's a section in Parker's 'Zero Blues' where Gayle's solo construction is so down-home that it makes him a sonic ringer for R&B altoist Tab Smith."

== Track listing ==
Disc 1

1. "Introduction" – 0:54
2. "Zero Blues" (Rashied Ali) – 7:25
3. "Hearts Joy" (Charles Gayle) – 13:23
4. "We Three" (Rashied Ali) – 14:37
5. "Different Stuff" (Rashied Ali) – 6:28
6. "Love One Another" (Charles Gayle) – 10:40
7. "Straight Ahead Steps" (Charles Gayle) – 7:19

Disc 2

1. "Peace Inside" (Charles Gayle) – 8:33
2. "Machu Picchu" (William Parker) – 10:46
3. "Cry Nu" (William Parker) – 7:58
4. "Eternal Voice" (William Parker) – 9:08
5. "No Sorrow" (Charles Gayle/William Parker/Rashied Ali) – 7:38

== Personnel ==
- Charles Gayle – alto saxophone
- William Parker – bass
- Rashied Ali – drums
