= Band on the Wall (album) =

Live album by Marilyn Crispell and Eddie Prévost
- Released: 1994
- Recorded: May 26, 1994
- Venue: Band on the Wall, Manchester, England
- Genre: Free Jazz
- Label: Matchless Recordings; MRCD25

Band on the Wall is a live album by pianist Marilyn Crispell and drummer Eddie Prévost. It was recorded at Band on the Wall in Manchester, England in May 1994, and was released later that year by Matchless Recordings.

== Reception ==
Professional ratings
Review scores
Source	Rating
AllMusic	4.5/5 stars
The Penguin Guide to Jazz	4/4 stars

In a review for AllMusic, Thom Jurek wrote: "Since Crispell was used to working with Gerry Hemingway, this set provides an amazing contrast for the pianist, in that everything in Prévost's elegant bag of tricks is very physical. Crispell is up for the spring, though... It's a tough hour, wearying and wiring by the end of it because there are precious few real breaks in the energetic pace. But it is rewarding, breathlessly so. In fact, it feels more like disbelief that they -- and you -- got through it with such satisfaction in your weariness."

The authors of the Penguin Guide to Jazz Recordings awarded the album 4 stars, and stated: "It's a fiery, sometimes almost violent performance in which ideas are run together with a challenging insouciance... Crispell has rarely sounded so thoroughly unfettered; oddly, perhaps, because Prévost is a highly disciplined drummer and one of the most swinging in a free idiom."

== Track listing ==
1. "Opening Time" (Crispell/Prévost) – 6:49
2. "Slow Chaser" (Crispell/Prévost) – 3:59
3. "Fragments" (Crispell) – 2:48
4. "Dogbolter" (Prévost) – 2:05
5. "Apart (I)" (Crispell) – 2:33
6. "As Our Tongues Lap Up The Burning Air" (Crispell) – 6:29
7. "Old Thumper" (Prévost) – 1:08
8. "Night Moves" (Crispell) – 12:11
9. "Bishop's Finger" (Prévost) – 1:11
10. "Irons" (Crispell/Prévost) – 3:47
11. "Quiet Now" (Denny Zeitlin) – 3:37
12. "Spitfire" (Prévost) – 3:42
13. "Last Orders" (Crispell/Prévost) – 8:20

== Personnel ==
- Marilyn Crispell – piano
- Eddie Prévost – drums
