= Quartetos =

Live album by Telectu
- Released: 2002
- Recorded: May/December 2001
- Genre: Avant-garde music, jazz fusion, experimental
- Length: 169:37
- Label: Clean Feed Records
- Producer: Telectu

Professional ratings
Review scores
Source	Rating
Allmusic	4/5 stars

Quartetos is a three-disc album released on Clean Feed Records in 2002 by Telectu. It was recorded live between May and December 2001 featuring different collaborators at different jazz festivals.

== Track listing ==
1. Untitled (disc one) -60:41
2. Untitled (disc two) -52:26
3. Untitled (disc three) - 56:30

== Personnel ==
- Jorge Lima Barreto – piano, prepared piano
- Vitor Rua – 18 string guitar, programming
- Tom Chant – Soprano sax
- Sunny Murray – drums (disc 1)
- Eddie Prévost – drums (disc 2)
- Gerry Hemingway – drums (disc 3)
