= Monks (album) =

Studio album by Borah Bergman, Wilber Morris, and Sunny Murray
- Released: 2019
- Recorded: April 30, 1996
- Studio: New York City
- Genre: Free jazz
- Labels: Some Real Music; 005/6
- Producer: Joe Chonto

Monks is an album by pianist Borah Bergman, bassist Wilber Morris, and drummer Sunny Murray. Featuring interpretations of music by Thelonious Monk, it was recorded on April 30, 1996, in New York City, and was issued in 2019 as a two-CD set by the Some Real Music label. Plans for the album's release were initially abandoned due to errors made by the original recording engineers, resulting in unusable DAT master tapes; however, in late 2018, producer Joe Chonto located alternate versions of the tapes, which were then used by engineer Jeff Willens to reassemble and remaster the final version.

== Reception ==
Professional ratings
Review scores
Source	Rating
All About Jazz	4.5/5 stars

In a review for All About Jazz, John Sharpe praised the trio's "startling reinvention" of Monk's music, and wrote: "Like a rich dessert, the session is perhaps best sampled in small portions to avoid calorific excess, but it is irresistible nonetheless."

Point of Departure's Ed Hazell called the album "a disc that will loosen the floorboards in your listening room," and stated: "Bergman can articulate several ideas running around in his head at once. When his independent lines surge in two different directions you get this ungrounded sensation of falling and flying at the same time. Murray wraps the music in his enigmatic presence and Morris pokes and prods at the interstitial spaces with imperturbable joy. Their interpretations of Monk are an astonishing feat of expressive nuance, conceptual density, and emotional power."

Pierre Crépon of The New York City Jazz Record described the album as a "significant addition to all three players' discographies," noting both Bergman's "crossed-hands ambidexterity" and Murray's "capacity for nuance" and "cymbal magic." He commented: "although entirely dedicated to Monk material, this session has nothing to do with formulaic exercise. 'A Free Association Peregrination in the Fecund and Funky Fields of Monkdom', the title of the sole non-Monk piece, indicates the general direction."

Writing for the Downtown Music Gallery, Bruce Lee Gallanter called the album "a masterwork of free/jazz at it very best," and remarked: "Bergman's intense two handed playing seems to inspire the trio to play full on, often with two currents crashing together and around one another, Bergman's left hand interacting with the bassist while his right hand erupts with the drums. The results are most exhilarating."

In an article for NPR, critic Francis Davis included the album in his list of the year's best jazz releases.

== Track listing ==
"A Free Association" composed by Borah Bergman. Remaining tracks composed by Thelonious Monk.

Disc 1

1. "Well You Needn't (Tk 1)" – 7:04
2. "Well You Needn't (Tk 2)" – 25:03
3. "Thelonious" – 19:17
4. "Light Blue" – 16:17

Disc 2

1. "'Round Midnight" – 16:02
2. "A Free Association Peregrination in the Fecund and Funky Fields of Monkdom" – 29:12
3. "Criss-Cross" – 13:22
4. "Well You Needn't (Slight Return)" – 13:42

== Personnel ==
- Borah Bergman – piano
- Wilber Morris – bass
- Sunny Murray – drums
