= Live at the Knitting Factory New York City =

Telectu

Studio album by Telectu
- Released: 1990
- Recorded: 1 October 1989
- Genre: Avant-garde music
- Length: 43:08
- Label: Mundo da canção
- Producer: Telectu

Live at the Knitting Factory New York City is an album released on Mundo da Canção in 1990 by Telectu.

== Track listing ==
1. Untitled – 4:44
2. Untitled – 10:52
3. Untitled – 3:34
4. Untitled – 2:43
5. Untitled – 9:54
6. Untitled – 4:52
7. Untitled – 5:01
8. Untitled – 3:28

== Personnel ==
- Jorge Lima Barreto: Samples, Computer Rhythm, Digital Winds
- Vitor Rua: Guitars (Controller, Prepared)
