= Sweet Space =

Live album by Billy Bang Sextet Featuring Frank Lowe
- Released: 1979
- Recorded: November 15, 1979
- Venues: Loeb Student Center, New York University, New York City
- Genre: Free jazz
- Length: 1:04:54
- Labels: Anima Productions; 12741
- Producer: John Mingione

Billy Bang chronology
New York Collage (1978)	Sweet Space (1979)	Distinction Without a Difference (1980)

Sweet Space is a live album by the Billy Bang Sextet, led by violinist Bang, and featuring tenor saxophonist Frank Lowe, alto saxophonist Luther Thomas, cornetist Butch Morris, pianist Curtis Clark, double bassist Wilber Morris, and drummer Steve McCall. It was recorded on November 15, 1979, at the Loeb Student Center of New York University in New York City, and was released on vinyl later that year by Anima Productions. In 2004, the 8th Harmonic Breakdown label reissued the album on CD, with four alternate takes, along with Bang's 1982 release Untitled Gift on the compilation Sweet Space/Untitled Gift.

== Reception ==
Professional ratings
Review scores
Source	Rating
AllMusic	3/5 stars
The Encyclopedia of Popular Music	3/5 stars
The Penguin Guide to Jazz Recordings (reissue)	3.5/4 stars
Tom Hull – on the Web (reissue)	A−

The authors of The Penguin Guide to Jazz Recordings noted "Bang's skittering fiddle shapes weaving in and out of the two saxophonists... Thomas relatively anonymous for all his stridency, Lowe working his usual furrow between the 'avant-garde' and the great tradition of Chu Berry and Coleman Hawkins."

One Final Note's Derek Taylor stated that the album "celebrate[s] both Bang's resilience and his lasting relationships with a core cadre of like-minded colleagues," and praised 8th Harmonic Breakdown for reissuing the material, writing: "Music this affirming and accomplished deserves a better break than resting solely in the hands of a few fortunate collectors."

Bill Shoemaker of Point of Departure commented: "each musician played an integral role in creating an ebullient, deceptively shambling ensemble sound," and stated that Butch Morris's "Music for the Love of It" "has a supple grace that makes it a fine set-closer, possessing enough elasticity for each musician to momentarily stretch the material without disfiguring it."

Writing about the 2004 reissue for All About Jazz, Terrell Kent Holmes remarked: "The free structure and embrace of atonality give this music its kick... Now that the audience has (almost) caught up to the artists, the reissue of these inventive recordings will enhance Bang's stature as one of the most vital and original voices on the scene today."

== Track listing ==
"Music for the Love of It" composed by Butch Morris. Remaining tracks composed by Billy Bang.

1. "A Pebble is a Small Rock (Dedicated to Mr. & Mrs. Irving Stone)" – 16:47
2. "Sweet Space" – 5:10
3. "Loweski for Frank (T.F.R.)" – 12:55
4. "Music for the Love of It" – 5:50

Bonus tracks on CD reissue

1. "A Pebble is a Small Rock (Alternate Take)" – 14:09
2. "Sweet Space (Alternate Take)" – 4:43
3. "Loweski for Frank (Alternate Take)" – 12:13
4. "Music for the Love of It (Alternate Take)" – 4:23

== Personnel ==
- Billy Bang – violin
- Frank Lowe – tenor saxophone
- Luther Thomas – alto saxophone
- Butch Morris – cornet
- Curtis Clark – piano
- Wilber Morris – double bass
- Steve McCall – drums
