= Consecration (album) =

Studio album by Charles Gayle
- Released: 1993
- Recorded: April 17 & 18, 1993
- Genre: Jazz
- Length: 67:23
- Label: Black Saint
- Producer: Flavio Bonandrini

Charles Gayle chronology
More Live from the Knitting Factory (1993)	Consecration (1993)	Berlin Movement from Future Years (1993)

Consecration is an album by American jazz saxophonist Charles Gayle featuring performances recorded in 1993 for the Italian Black Saint label.

== Reception ==
Professional ratings
Review scores
Source	Rating
AllMusic	4.5/5 stars
The Penguin Guide to Jazz Recordings	4/4 stars

The AllMusic review by Brian Flota awarded the album 4½ stars stating "these performances are not easy to listen to, given their time-free chaos, but the emotional impact of the playing achieved here, like Gayle's other work, is unrivaled".

In an article for the Los Angeles Times, Don Snowden wrote that Gayle "unleashes fierce scale runs and multiphonic squawks over a furious cello/bass/ drums foundation. 'Glorious Saints' and Gayle's bass clarinet feature 'Thy Peace' work best because a greater attention to dynamics leaves enough open space for the music to breathe."

== Track listing ==
All compositions by Charles Gayle

1. "O Father" - 15:16
2. "Rise Up" - 10:02
3. "Justified" - 8:37
4. "Glorious Saints" - 13:19
5. "Thy Peace" - 8:33
6. "Redemption" - 11:36
  - Recorded at Sear Sound in New York City on April 17 & 18, 1993

== Personnel ==
- Charles Gayle - tenor saxophone, bass clarinet
- William Parker - violin, cello
- Vattel Cherry - bass
- Michael Wimberly - drums
