= A New Frontier =

Studio album by Borah Bergman
- Released: 1983
- Recorded: January 1983
- Genre: Jazz
- Label: Soul Note
- Producer: Giovanni Bonandrini

A New Frontier is a solo piano album by Borah Bergman. It was recorded in 1983 and released by Soul Note.

== Recording and music ==
The album of solo piano performances by Bergman was recorded in New York in January 1983. It was produced by Giovanni Bonandrini. There are two pieces, each split into two movements. Bergman "sets up huge whirling shapes with each hand, which then engage in confrontational dialogue."

== Release and reception ==
Professional ratings
Review scores
Source	Rating
AllMusic	3/5 stars
The Penguin Guide to Jazz	4/4 stars

A New Frontier was released by Soul Note in 1983. The AllMusic reviewer wrote that "This is intense solo piano that requires just as committed and concentrated an effort from the audience as the performer in order to appreciate and follow the direction." The Penguin Guide to Jazz contrasted the pieces: "There is something slightly mechanistic about the playing on 'Night Circus' that makes one think of the player-piano pieces of Conlon Nancarrow, but this is eliminated on the remarkable 'Time for Intensity', a more richly coloured pair of contrasting pieces, the second of which, 'Webs and Whirlpools', is quite astonishing."

== Track listing ==
1. "Night Circus, Part I – By the Red Moon" – 12:54
2. "Night Circus, Part II – Trapeze" – 8:56
3. "Time for Intensity – Swift River" – 9:45
4. "Time for Intensity – Webs & Whirlpools" – 10:36

== Personnel ==
- Borah Bergman – piano
