= Geometry (Ivo Perelman album) =

Studio album by Ivo Perelman
- Released: 1997
- Recorded: June 1996
- Studio: Systems Two, Brooklyn
- Genre: Jazz
- Length: 57:03
- Label: Leo
- Producer: Ivo Perelman, Leo Feigin

Ivo Perelman chronology
Sad Life (1997)	Geometry (1997)	Perelman/Parker/Ali Live (1997)

Geometry is an album by Brazilian jazz saxophonist Ivo Perelman featuring American pianist Borah Bergman, which was recorded in 1996 and released on the English Leo label.

== Reception ==
Professional ratings
Review scores
Source	Rating
AllMusic	3/5 stars
The Penguin Guide to Jazz	3.5/4 stars

In his review for AllMusic, Alex Henderson says that "this CD doesn't quite fall into the 'essential' category... Nonetheless, Geometry is an enjoyable release that Perelman's more-devoted followers will want."

The Penguin Guide to Jazz notes that "Bergman is wily enough to find ways of both supporting and undercutting the mighty sound of the tenor."

== Track listing ==
All compositions by Ivo Perelman

1. "Geometry" - 11:02
2. "Linear Pasion" - 4:46
3. "Parallelism" - 9:30
4. "Cavaquinho take 1" - 2:56
5. "Cubic Rotation" - 11:23
6. "Equal Angels" - 4:22
7. "Sonic Conic" - 2:57
8. "Subspaces" - 6:41
9. "Cavaquinho take 2" - 3:26

== Personnel ==
- Ivo Perelman - tenor sax
- Borah Bergman - piano
