= More Live at the Knitting Factory =

More Life at the Knitting Factory

Live album by Charles Gayle
- Released: 1993
- Recorded: February 1, 15, and 22, 1993
- Venue: The Knitting Factory
- Genre: Jazz
- Length: 2:19:00

More Live at the Knitting Factory is a 1993 two-CD live album by Charles Gayle. It was recorded on February 1, 15, and 22, 1993 at The Knitting Factory.

== Reception ==
Professional ratings
Review scores
Source	Rating
The Penguin Guide to Jazz Recordings	4/4 stars
AllMusic	4.5/5 stars

In a review for AllMusic, Ron Wynn wrote: "Tenor saxophonist Charles Gayle plays with such fury and intensity that it seems he won't make it through the performances featured on these two discs... It's impossible not to remember the 1960s and '70s free and loft jazz schools, but it's also appropriate to emphasize that Gayle doesn't sound like anyone else currently active and deserves significant attention beyond tiny jazz publications and sympathetic, but small, audiences."

The authors of The Penguin Guide to Jazz awarded the album 4 stars, and commented: "The rhythm-players... are all little known, apart from the admirable Parker... but they are wonderfully behind Gayle all the way... The... records... are exhausting manifestos... which struggle towards ecstasy or chaos, depending on one's own tolerance. A piece such as 'Sanctification'... certainly goes further in building on Ayler's legacy than even Brötzmann ever has."

== Track listing ==
All tracks are written by Charles Gayle.

No.	Title	Length
1.	"Sealed Books"	23:17
2.	"Take Refuge"	24:59
3.	"Covenants"	9:23
4.	"Most High"	11:02
5.	"Deliverance"	9:44
6.	"Sanctification"	25:05
7.	"Living Waters"	16:19
8.	"Newness of Life"	8:20
9.	"Gifts"	11:21

== Personnel ==
Musicians

- Vattel Cherry - bass
- Marc Edwards - drums
- Charles Gayle - bass clarinet, tenor saxophone, violin
- William Parker - bass, cello, violin
- Michael Wimberly - drums

Technical

- James McLean - engineer
- Michael Dorf - executive producer
- Jeff Schlanger - artwork
