= Frank Lowe =

American jazz saxophonist and composer

Background information
- Born: Frank Lowe; June 24, 1943; Memphis, Tennessee, United States
- Died: September 19, 2003 (aged 60) New York City, New York, United States
- Genres: Free jazz, avant-garde jazz
- Occupation: Musician
- Instrument: Tenor saxophone
- Years active: 1960s–2002
- Labels: Arista Freedom, Bird Notes, Debut, ESP-Disk, Impulse!, Marge

Frank Lowe (June 24, 1943 – September 19, 2003) was an American avant-garde jazz saxophonist and composer.

== Biography ==
Born in Memphis, Tennessee, Lowe took up the tenor saxophone at the age of 12. As an adult he moved to San Francisco, where he met Ornette Coleman. Coleman suggested Lowe visit to New York City, which Lowe did, and he began playing with Sun Ra and then Alice Coltrane, with whom he recorded in 1971. Unusually for the jazz culture at the time, Lowe had had no extended apprenticeship or slow paying-of-dues: one moment he was an amateur, and the next he was playing with the late John Coltrane's rhythm section. With Alice Coltrane he recorded World Galaxy in 1971.

Lowe began recording with his own group in 1973, with his album Black Beings, on ESP-Disk.

Lowe was a tenor saxophonist who was extremely influenced by the first and second waves of free jazz throughout the 1960s. His composition "Spirits in the Field" was performed on Arthur Blythe's 1977 album, The Grip.

On September 19, 2003, he died of lung cancer. His legacy was a varied body of recordings and memorable performances.

== Discography ==
=== As leader ===
- 1973: Duo Exchange with Rashied Ali
- 1973: Black Beings with Joseph Jarman, Rashid Sinan, Raymund Cheng, William Parker
- 1975: Fresh with Lester Bowie Joseph Bowie, Abdul Wadud, Steve Reid
- 1975: The Flam (Black Saint) with Joseph Bowie, Leo Smith, Alex Blake, Charles Bobo Shaw
- 1976: Tricks of the Trade (Marge) with Butch Morris, Didier Levallet, George Brown
- 1976: The Other Side (Palm) with Butch Morris, Didier Levallet, George Brown
- 1977: Doctor Too-Much (Kharma) with Olu Dara, Leo Smith, Phillip Wilson, Fred Williams
- 1977: Lowe & Behold with Joseph Bowie, Butch Morris, Arthur Williams, Billy Bang, Polly Bradfield, Eugene Chadbourne, John Lindberg, Phillip Wilson, John Zorn, Peter Kuhn
- 1977: Don't Punk Out with Eugene Chadbourne
- 1981: Skizoke with Butch Morris, Damon Choice, Larry Simon, Wilber Morris, Tim Pleasant
- 1981: Exotic Heartbreak (Soul Note) with Butch Morris, Amina Claudine Myers, Wilber Morris, Tim Pleasant
- 1982: Live from Soundscape (DIW with Lawrence Butch Morris, Amina Claudine Myers, Wilber Morris, Tim Pleasant
- 1983: The Jazz Doctors: Intensive Care with Rafael Garrett, Denis Charles, Billy Bang
- 1984: Isle in the Ocean with Billy Bang, Frank Wollny, Heinz Wollny, A. R. Penck
- 1984: Decision in Paradise (Soul Note) with Don Cherry, Grachan Moncur III, Geri Allen, Charnett Moffett, Charles Moffett
- 1991: Inappropriate Choices with James Carter, Michael Marcus, Carlos Ward, Phillip Wilson
- 1992: Out of Nowhere with Phillip Wilson
- 1995: Bodies & Soul mikt Charles Moffett, Tim Flood
- 1996: After the Demon's Leaving with Bernard Santacruz, Denis Charles
- 1997: Vision Blue with Steve Neil, Anders Griffen
- 1998: Soul Folks with Bertha Hope, Jack Walrath, Steve Neil, Ralph Peterson
- 1998: One for Jazz with Billy Bang, Ed Schuller, Abbey Rader
- 1999: Short Tales
- 2000: Don't Punk Out with Eugene Chadbourne
- 2002: Lowe Down & Blue with Bern Nix, Dominic Duval, Michael Carvin
- 2014: Out Loud (Triple Point Records) Joe Bowie, William Parker, Steve Reid (prev. unissued live & studio recordings from 1974)

=== As sideman ===
With Alice Coltrane

- World Galaxy (Impulse!, 1972)

With Billy Bang

- Sweet Space (Anima, 1979)
- Outline No. 12 (Celluloid, 1982 [1983])
- Valve No. 10 (Soul Note, 1988)
- Vietnam: The Aftermath (Justin Time, 2001)
- Above & Beyond: An Evening in Grand Rapids (Justin Time, 2007)

With Don Cherry

- Relativity Suite (JCOA, 1973)
- Brown Rice (EMI, 1975)

With Joe McPhee

- Legend Street One (CIMP, 1996)
- Legend Street Two (CIMP, 1996)

With Juma Sultan's Aboriginal Music Society

- Father of Origin (Eremite, 2011) recorded in 1970–1971
