= Charles Gayle =

American free jazz musician (1939–2023)

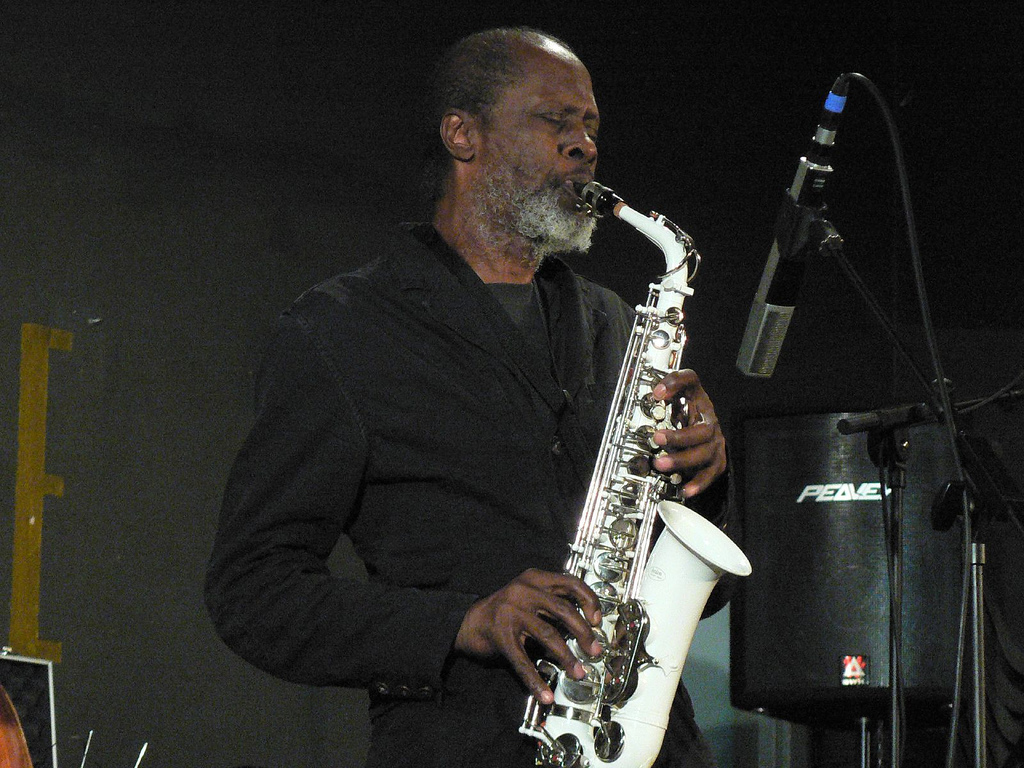
- Gayle performing in 2007

Background information
- Born: February 28, 1939; Buffalo, New York, U.S.
- Origin: New York City, New York, U.S.
- Died: September 7, 2023 (aged 84) New York City, U.S.
- Genre: Jazz
- Occupations: Musician, educator
- Instruments: Tenor saxophone, alto saxophone, piano, bass clarinet, acoustic bass
- Years active: 1960s–2023
- Labels: Silkheart, Black Saint, Knitting Factory, FMP, Clean Feed, Tompkins Square

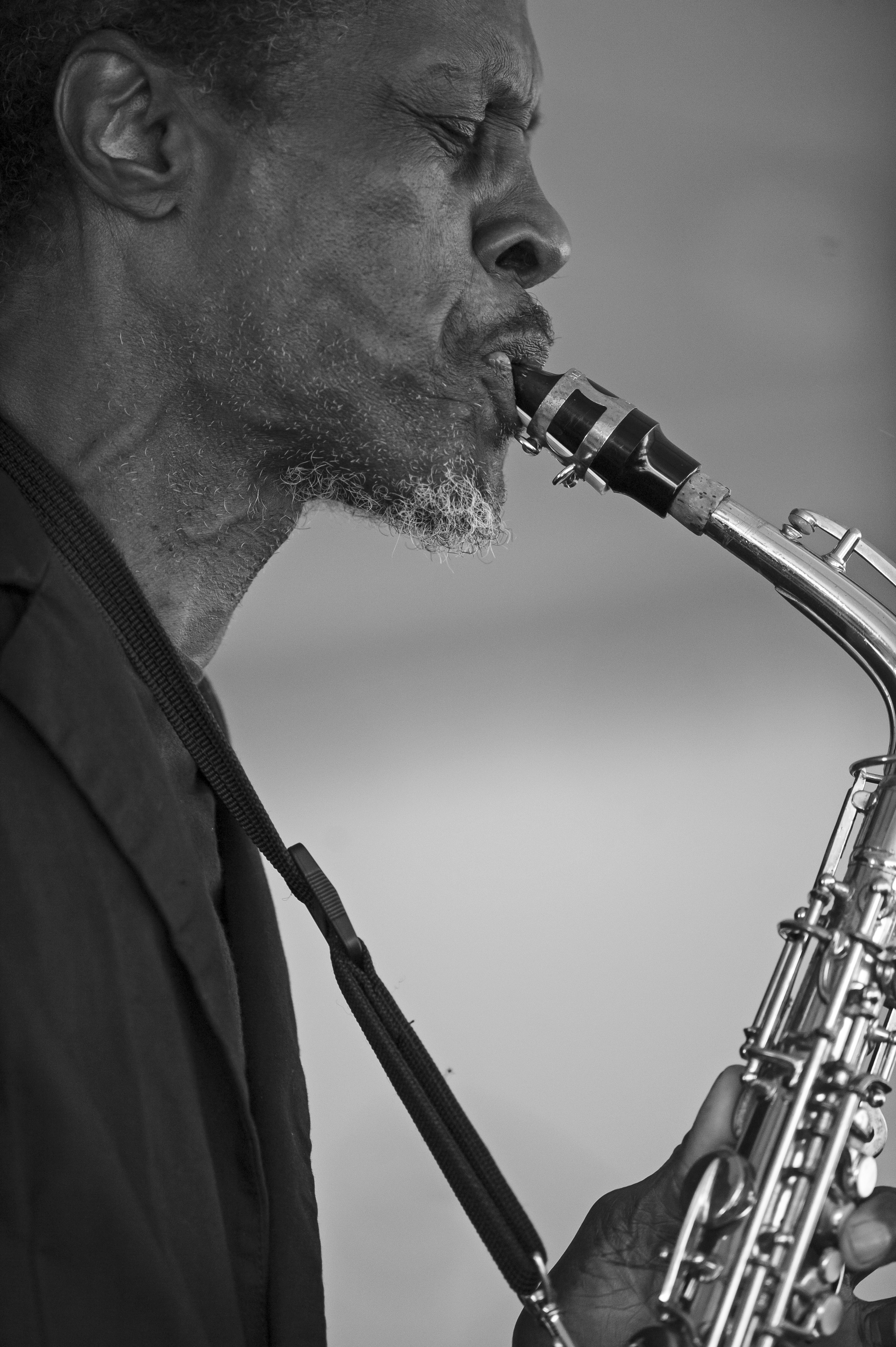
Charles Gayle, George Wein's CareFusion Jazz Festival 55 – Newport, RI

Charles Gayle (February 28, 1939 – September 7, 2023) was an American free jazz musician. Initially known as a saxophonist who came to prominence in the 1990s after decades of obscurity, Gayle also performed as pianist, bass clarinetist, bassist, and percussionist.

== Biography ==
Charles Gayle was born on February 28, 1939, in Buffalo, New York. Gayle was often reluctant to talk about himself during interview, so many details of his life are uncertain. He briefly taught music at the University at Buffalo before relocating to New York City during the early 1970s.

Gayle was homeless for approximately twenty years, playing saxophone on street corners and subway platforms around New York City. He had described making a conscious decision to become homeless: "I had to shed my history, my life, everything had to stop right there, and if you live through this, good, and if you don't, you don't. I can't do the rent, the odd jobs, the little rooms, scratchin', and all that, no!" At the same time, this allowed Gayle to devote most of his time to playing music, although he often earned less than US$3 a day from busking:

First of all, I played to play because I need to play. Second of all, the money, a dollar meant a lot to me at that time. Playing out there is obviously different than playing on a stage but that is so rich out there. It's such a whole 'nother world of playin'. I mean I used to walk from Times Square, for instance, all the way to Wall Street playin'. I could walk back and never stop playing. I didn't think about it as anything other than what it was. These were people and I wasn't overly concerned with what they thought. I was playing, I had to play. Also I had to eat some way and I'm not the type to put my hand out. I'd stand there playing with a coffee cup sometime and people would put money in my coffee [Laughs] and you don't get that on the stage. That's beautiful.

When Gayle first set out on the streets, he did not imagine he would remain homeless as long as he did, although he estimated that this period lasted closer to fifteen years than twenty.

In 1988, he gained fame through a trio of albums recorded in one week and released by Swedish label, Silkheart Records. Since then he had become a major figure in free jazz, recording for labels including Black Saint, Knitting Factory Records, FMP, and Clean Feed. He has also taught music at Bennington College.

Gayle's music is spiritual, intended to express his religious beliefs, and heavily inspired by the Old and New Testaments. Gayle explained, "I want the people to enjoy the music and if it, in anyway can suggest something about the Lord, for their benefit, that would be first in my mind." He had explicitly dedicated several albums to God. His childhood was influenced by religion, and his musical roots trace to black gospel music. He had performed and recorded with Cecil Taylor, William Parker, and Rashied Ali. Perhaps Gayle's most celebrated work is the album Touchin' on Trane (FMP) with Parker and Ali, which received the "Crown" accolade from the Penguin Guide to Jazz.

Though he established his reputation primarily as a tenor saxophonist, he had increasingly turned to other instruments, notably the piano (his original instrument), violin, bass clarinet and alto saxophone. More controversially, he had sometimes included lengthy spoken-word addresses to the audience in his concerts touching on his political and religious beliefs: "I understand that when you start speaking about faith or religion, they want you to keep it in a box, but I'm not going to do that. Not because I'm taking advantage of being a musician, I'm the same everywhere, and people have to understand that." Gayle sometimes performed as a mime, "Streets the Clown." "Streets means to me, first, a freedom from Charles. I'm not good at being the center of attention…. It's a liberation from Charles, even though it's me on the stage, it's a different person."

In 2001, Gayle recorded an album entitled Jazz Solo Piano. It consisted mostly of straightforward jazz standards, and was a response to critics who charge that free jazz musicians cannot play bebop. In 2006, Gayle followed up with a second album of solo piano, this time featuring original material, entitled Time Zones.

Gayle appears in the 1985 Jazz documentary, "Rising Tones Cross", directed by Ebba Jahn. He is seen playing with Rashied Ali, Marilyn Crispell, and many others, and is interviewed.

Charles Gayle died in Brooklyn, New York on September 7 2023, at the age of 84. He had suffered from complications of Alzheimer's disease.

== Discography ==
=== As leader or co-leader ===
- Always Born (Silkheart, 1988)
- Homeless (Silkheart, 1989)
- Spirits Before (Silkheart, 1988)
- Repent (Knitting Factory, 1992)
- More Live at the Knitting Factory (Knitting Factory, 1993)
- Touchin' on Trane (FMP, 1993)
- Consecration (Black Saint, 1993)
- Raining Fire (Silkheart, 1993)
- Translations (Silkheart, 1993)
- Live at Disobey (Blast First, 1994)
- Kingdom Come (Knitting Factory, 1994)
- Unto I Am (Victo, 1995)
- Testaments (Knitting Factory, 1995)
- Delivered (2.13.61, 1997)
- Berlin Movement from Future Years (FMP, 1997)
- Solo in Japan (PSF, 1997)
- Daily Bread (Black Saint, 1998)
- Ancient of Days (Knitting Factory, 1999)
- Abiding Variations (FMP, 1999)
- Jazz Solo Piano (Knitting Factory, 2001)
- Precious Soul (FMP, 2001)
- No Bills (Long Arms, 2005)
- Shout! (Clean Feed, 2005)
- Time Zones (Tompkins Square, 2006)
- Live at Glenn Miller Cafe (Ayler, 2006)
- Consider the Lilies (Clean Feed, 2006)
- Blue Shadows (Silkheart, 2007)
- Forgiveness (Not Two, 2008)
- Live at Crescendo (Ayler, 2008) with By Any Means (Gayle, William Parker, and Rashied Ali)
- Our Souls: Live in Vilnius (NoBusiness, 2010)
- Streets (Northern Spy, 2012)
- Look Up (ESP Disk, 2012)
- Christ Everlasting (For Tune, 2015)
- Solar System (For Tune, 2017)
- Seasons Changing (Otoroku 2019)
- The Alto Sessions (El Negocito, 2019)

=== As sideman ===
- Sunny Murray, Illuminators (Audible Hiss, 1996)
- William Parker, Requiem (Splasc(H), 2006)
- William Parker. For Those Who Are, Still (Aum Fidelity 2015) Charles Gayle on Disc Three.
- Henry Rollins, Everything (2.13.61, 1996)
- Henry Rollins, Weighting (2.13.61, 2003)
- Sirone and Billy Bang, Configuration (Silkheart, 2005)
- Cecil Taylor, Always a Pleasure (FMP, 1996)
