= Telectu =

- Vítor Rua (guitar), Jorge Lima Barreto (piano)

Background information
- Origin: Portugal
- Genres: Free jazz, cyber jazz, avant-garde rock, electronica, experimental music, concrete music, minimalism
- Years active: 1982–2011

Telectu is a Portuguese experimental, avant-garde music duo formed in 1982 by Vítor Rua (former member of GNR) and Jorge Lima Barreto, a jazz musician and musical essayist. Their music incorporates a variety of elements from free jazz, rock, electronica, minimalism and concrete music. They are arguably the most important project of its genre in Portugal. Their career spanning 30 years, includes a voluminous discography, many national and international performances and collaborations, both live and recorded, with important experimental and improvisation musicians such as Elliott Sharp, Carlos Zíngaro, Jac Berrocal, Sunny Murray, Chris Cutler amongst others. They have also composed music for theater, video art and multimedia performance. Although the project ceased recording new material with the death of Jorge Lima Barreto in 2011, Telectu continues to perform live sporadically, with Vitor Rua and Ilda Teresa Castro.

== Discography ==
- 1982 Ctu Telectu, LP, Valentim De Carvalho, EMI
- 1983 Belzebu, LP, Ediçao Cliché
- 1984 Off Off, 2xLP, 3 Macacos
- 1984 Performance IV Bienal De Cerveira, LP, 3 Macacos
- 1985 Telefone – Live Moscow, LP, Telectu, 1985
- 1985 Fundaçao, LP, 3 Macacos
- 1986 Halley, LP, CNC/Altamira
- 1987 Rosa-Cruz, LP, not on label (possibly: 3 Macacos)
- 1988 Camerata Elettronica, 2xLP, Ama Romanta
- 1988 Mimesis, LP, Schiu!/Transmédia
- 1990 Digital Buiça, LP, Tragic Figures
- 1990 Encounters II / Labirintho 7.8, LP, Mundo Da Cancão
- 1990 Live at the Knitting Factory New York City, LP, Mundo Da Cancão
- 1992 Evil Metal (with Elliott Sharp), CD, Área Total
- 1993 Belzebu/Off Off, CD, AnAnAnA
- 1993 Theremin Tao, CD, SPH
- 1994 Biombos, CD, China Record Corporation
- 1995 Jazz Off Multimedia, CD, AnAnAnA
- 1995 Telectu-Cutler-Berrocal, CD, Fábrica De Sons
- 1997 À Lagardère w/ Jac Berrocal, CD, Numérica
- 1998 Prélude, Rhapsodie & Coda, CD, Nova Musica
- 2002 Quartetos, 3xCD, Clean Feed
