= Natural Balance =

Natural Balance may refer to:

- Natural Balance Pet Foods, an American pet food manufacturer
- Natural Balance (album), a 1986 album by the String Trio of New York
