= James Emery (musician) =

American jazz guitarist

- Born: December 21, 1951 (age 74); Youngstown, Ohio, U.S.
- Genres: Jazz, avant-garde, classical
- Occupations: Musician, composer
- Instrument: Guitar
- Years active: 1969–present
- Labels: Enja, Black Saint, Between the Lines
- Member of: String Trio of New York
- Website: www.james-emery.com

James Emery (born December 21, 1951) is an American jazz guitarist. He grew up in Willoughby, Ohio and Shaker Heights, Ohio. Emery plays archtop guitar, semi-acoustic guitar, electric guitar, and soprano guitar.

== Career ==
Emery's parents were musicians. His father Alva played trumpet, and his mother Rosemary played piano. Emery started playing organ when he was six. A few years later, he began taking classical guitar lessons.

During his senior year in high school he taught guitar at a music store run by guitarist Bill DeArango, and during their free time Emery and DeArango played together. At the end of the 1960s, he studied composition and music theory at Cleveland State University. In 1973 Emery moved to New York City.

During the 1970s, Emery toured with the Human Arts Ensemble and guests Lester Bowie, George Lewis, and Philip Wilson. He also performed with Leroy Jenkins, Anthony Braxton, Kalaparusha Maurice McIntyre, Bobby Naughton, and Karl Berger. He taught at the Creative Music Studio in Woodstock, New York. In 1977, he founded the String Trio of New York with violinist Billy Bang and bassist John Lindberg.

Emery has written over one hundred fifty compositions for jazz trio, solo guitar, chamber ensembles, and symphony orchestras. He received a Guggenheim Fellowship for music composition in 1995. He has worked with Muhal Richard Abrams, Derek Bailey, Ed Blackwell, Jerome Cooper, Mark Feldman, Gerry Hemingway, Dave Holland, David Izenzon, Joe Lovano, Butch Morris, Sunny Murray, Dewey Redman, Steve Reich, Sam Rivers, Sirone, Wadada Leo Smith, Chris Speed, Henry Threadgill, and John Zorn. He has led ensembles which included Pheeroan akLaff, Jay Anderson, Ray Anderson, Thurman Barker, Tony Coe, Robert Dick, Marty Ehrlich, Michael Formanek, Drew Gress, Gerry Hemingway, Franz Koglmann, J. D. Parran, Ed Schuller, Rob Schwimmer, and Judi Silvano.

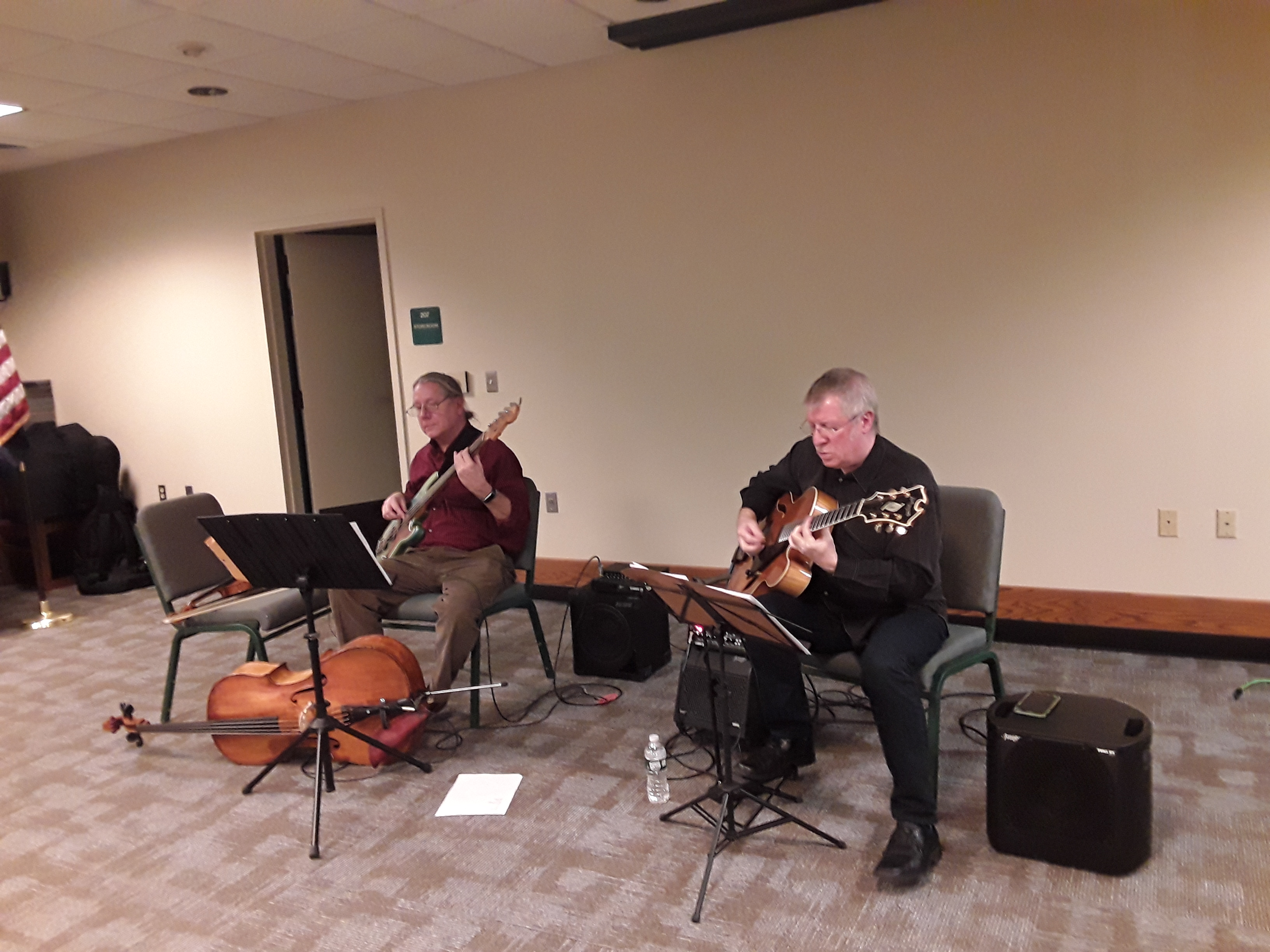
James Emery (right) @ Thrall Library Middletown, NY 2019

== Discography ==
=== As leader ===
- Artlife (Lumina, 1982)
- Exo Eso (FMP, 1988)
- Turbulence (Knitting Factory, 1991)
- Standing on a Whale Fishing for Minnows (Enja, 1997)
- Spectral Domains (Enja, 1998)
- Luminous Cycles (Between the Lines, 2000)
- Fourth World (Between the Lines, 2001)
- Transformations (Between the Lines, 2003)

With the String Trio of New York

- First String (Black Saint, 1979)
- Area Code 212 (Black Saint, 1981)
- Common Goal (Black Saint, 1982)
- Rebirth of a Feeling (Black Saint, 1984)
- Natural Balance (Black Saint, 1987)
- String Trio of New York & Jay Clayton (West Wind, 1988)
- Ascendant (Stash, 1990)
- Time Never Lies (Stash, 1991)
- Intermobility (Arabesque, 1993)
- An Outside Job (AA Records, 1994)
- Octagon (Black Saint, 1994)
- Blues...? (Black Saint, 1995)
- Ellington/Monk/Mingus/Davis (Music & Arts, 1997)
- Gut Reaction (Omnitone, 2003)
- As Tears Go By (NewEdition, 2005)
- Frozen Ropes with Oliver Lake (Barking Hoop, 2005)
- The River of Orion (Black Saint, 2008)

=== As sideman ===
With Anthony Braxton

- Creative Orchestra (Köln) 1978 (HatART, 1995)
- Composition No. 94 for Three Instrumentalists (1980) (Golden Years of Jazz, 1999)
- Orchestra (Paris) 1978 (Braxton Bootleg, 2011)

With Wadada Leo Smith

- Human Rights (Kebell, 1986)
- Rastafari (Gramm, 1987)
- Who Killed David Walker? (CMIF, 1987)

With others

- Thurman Barker, Time Factor (Uptee, 2001)
- Thurman Barker, Voyage (Uptee, 1987)
- Jay Clayton, John Lindberg, As Tears Go by (ITM, 1988)
- Jay Clayton, John Lindberg, String Trio of New York, As Tears Goes by & More Songs (Jazzwerkstatt, 2014)
- Gerry Hemingway, Songs (Between the Lines, 2002)
- Human Arts Ensemble, The Human Arts Ensemble Live Vol. II (Circle, 1978)
- Leroy Jenkins, For Players Only (JCOA, 1975)
- Leroy Jenkins, Urban Blues (Black Saint, 1984)
- Franz Koglmann, Don't Play, Just Be (Between the Lines, 2001)
- Bobby Naughton, Nauxtagram (Otic, 1979)
- Charles "Bobo" Shaw / Human Arts Ensemble, Junk Trap (Black Saint, 1978)
- Henry Threadgill, Makin' a Move (Columbia, 1995)
- Henry Threadgill, Song Out of My Trees (Black Saint, 1994)
