= First String =

Studio album by String Trio of New York
- Released: 1979
- Recorded: June 1979
- Genre: Jazz
- Length: 36:58
- Label: Black Saint

String Trio of New York chronology
First String (1979)	Area Code 212 (1980)

First String is the debut album by American jazz group the String Trio of New York recorded in 1979 for the Italian Black Saint label.

== Reception ==
The Allmusic review by Scott Yanow awarded the album 4 stars stating "the music expertly blends composition with improvisation. This music (free at times but always going in a logical direction) grows in interest with each listen".

Professional ratings
Review scores
Source	Rating
Allmusic	4/5 stars
The Penguin Guide to Jazz Recordings	3/4 stars

== Track listing ==
1. "The East Side Suite" (John Lindberg) - 19:55
2. "Subway Ride With Giuseppi Logan" (Billy Bang) - 8:00
3. "Catharsis in Real Time" (James Emery) - 9:03
  - Recorded at Barigozzi Studio in Milano, Italy in June 1979

== Personnel ==
- Billy Bang – violin
- James Emery – guitar
- John Lindberg – bass
