= Area Code 212 (album) =

Studio album by String Trio of New York
- Released: 1980
- Recorded: November 25 & 26, 1980
- Genre: Jazz
- Length: 42:36
- Label: Black Saint
- Producer: Giovanni Bonandrini

String Trio of New York chronology
First String (1979)	Area Code 212 (1980)	Common Goal (1981)

Area Code 212 is the second album by American jazz group the String Trio of New York recorded in 1980 for the Italian Black Saint label. The albums was recorded at Barigozzi Studio in Milan on November 25 and 26, 1980.

== Reception ==
The AllMusic review awarded the album 4 1/2 stars.

Professional ratings
Review scores
Source	Rating
AllMusic	4.5/5 stars
The Penguin Guide to Jazz Recordings	3/4 stars

== Track listing ==
1. "Twixt C and D" (John Lindberg) - 6:58
2. "Strawberries" (Lindberg) - 9:12
3. "Echovamp" - (Billy Bang) - 5:15
4. "Coho" (James Emery) - 8:17
5. "Bang's Bounce" (Bang) - 5:57
6. "Abjunctinuity" (Emery) - 6:57

== Personnel ==
- Billy Bang – violin
- James Emery – guitar
- John Lindberg – bass
