= Rebirth of a Feeling =

Studio album by String Trio of New York
- Released: 1984
- Recorded: November 25 & 26, 1983
- Genre: Jazz
- Length: 42:31
- Label: Black Saint
- Producer: Giovanni Bonandrini

String Trio of New York chronology
Common Goal (1982)	Rebirth of a Feeling (1984)	Natural Balance (1986)

Rebirth of a Feeling is the fourth album by American jazz group the String Trio of New York recorded in 1983 for the Italian Black Saint label.

== Reception ==
The Allmusic review by Ron Wynn awarded the album 4½ stars stating "this was a unified effort. The String Trio of New York ranks as a premier outside group of the 1970s and '80s".

Professional ratings
Review scores
Source	Rating
Allmusic	4.5/5 stars
The Penguin Guide to Jazz Recordings	3.5/4 stars

== Track listing ==
1. "Open Up" (James Emery) - 7:40
2. "Karottenkopf" (Billy Bang) - 5:58
3. "Ephemera Trilogy" (Emery) - 7:30
4. "Penguins An' Other Strange Birds" (Bang) - 7:23
5. "Utility Grey" (John Lindberg) - 14:00

- Recorded at Barigozzi Studio in Milano, Italy on November 25 & 26, 1983

== Personnel ==
- Billy Bang - violin
- James Emery - guitar
- John Lindberg - bass
