= It's Christmas Again =

Studio album by Max Roach
- Released: 1987
- Recorded: June 2, 25–26, 1984
- Venue: Milan, Italy
- Studio: Barigozzi Studio
- Genre: Jazz
- Length: 41:53
- Label: Soul Note
- Producer: Max Roach

Max Roach chronology
Scott Free (1984)	It's Christmas Again (1987)	Collage (1984)

It's Christmas Again is an album by the American jazz drummer Max Roach, recorded in 1984 for the Italian Soul Note label.

== Critical reception ==
Professional ratings
Review scores
Source	Rating
AllMusic	2.5/5 stars
The Penguin Guide to Jazz	3/4 stars

The AllMusic review by Scott Yanow stated: "It's Christmas Again is a project that for many did not work, but no matter how you slice it, an intriguing aside to Roach's discography. As he often mixed words with jazz, this is less ambitious than previous works, but could be looked upon as more than a little ambiguous, and certainly a cynical view of a time of the year that should be joyous, but for many is difficult." The Penguin Guide to Jazz commented on the albums links with other material from around the same time: "anyone familiar with this period or who takes the time to listen to these Soul Notes in a structured way will find a great deal of cross-fertilization going on".

== Track listing ==
All compositions by Max Roach

1. "It's Christmas Again" – 20:41
2. "Christina" – 21:12

== Personnel ==
- Max Roach – drums, keyboards, percussion, vibraphone, voice
- Cecil Bridgewater – trumpet
- Tony Scott – clarinet (track 2)
- Lee Konitz – alto saxophone (track 2)
- Odean Pope – tenor saxophone, voice
- Tomaso Lama – guitar (track 2)
- Tyrone Brown – electric bass guitar
