= Vietnam: The Aftermath =

Studio album by Billy Bang
- Released: 2001
- Recorded: April 13 and 14, 2001
- Studios: Sorcerer Sound, New York City
- Genre: Free jazz
- Labels: Justin Time; JUST 165
- Producers: Billy Bang, Jean-Pierre Leduc

Billy Bang chronology
Big Bang Theory (2000)	Vietnam: The Aftermath (2001)	Vietnam: Reflections (2005)

Vietnam: The Aftermath is an album by violinist Billy Bang. It was recorded on April 13 and 14, 2001, at Sorcerer Sound in New York City, and was released later that year by Justin Time Records. On the album, Bang is joined by saxophonist Frank Lowe, flutist Sonny Fortune, trumpeter Ted Daniel, pianist John Hicks, double bassist Curtis Lundy, drummer Michael Carvin, and percussionist Ron Brown. The ensemble is conducted by Butch Morris.

The album came about when Jean-Pierre Leduc of Justin Time suggested that Bang create a recording about his experiences in the Vietnam War. Bang recalled that, as a result of the conversation, his "entire body and mind came to an immediate halt," and he "felt a cold shiver." However, after several days of contemplation, he replied and stated that he was "ready, willing, and able to embark on the Vietnam project."

Four years after the album's release, Justin Time issued a follow-up titled Vietnam: Reflections.

== Reception ==
Professional ratings
Review scores
Source	Rating
All About Jazz	4.5/5 stars
AllMusic	3/5 stars
The Penguin Guide to Jazz	3.5/4 stars
Tom Hull – on the Web	A

In a review for AllMusic, Glenn Astarita called the album "invigorating," and wrote: "this program is fabricated upon interweaving Asian undertones, groove-laden rhythms, and the instrumentalists' strong soloing... the violinist's steadfast commitment to this deeply personal undertaking cannot be compromised."

The authors of The Penguin Guide to Jazz Recordings stated: "Instead of attempting to convey just the horrors of the Vietnam war... Bang has created a sound-picture of a wider world. He uses what sound like authentically Asian themes and scales to build up a surprisingly gentle collage into which the few eruptions of real violence... arrive with even greater dramatic force."

Critic Tom Hull described the album as "the record of a lifetime," and noted that it "succeeds on at least three levels: Bang's compositions are a good deal more complete and melodic than he's ever needed before; his violin captures perfectly the musical tone of Indochina; Butch Morris' conduction holds a large ensemble tightly on track."

Matt Rand of All About Jazz remarked: "the quick exhalations that Bang blows from his violin sound as if he is running farther inside himself, reaching for areas into which he has pushed deeper within over the years. But in cutting deeper into the thick of his own jungle, he offers listeners a chance to go with him, to begin, perhaps, to understand an experience that no one should go through alone." AAJ's Jim Santella wrote: "Bang and five other members of the ensemble are veterans. They've turned these memories into a positive affair. Culture, society, and a deeper meaning color the session thoroughly, but they're couched in lively, straight-ahead jazz terms." Another AAJ reviewer stated that the album "defies categorization, which automatically makes it a disc worth investigation. With Bang at the helm, you can be assured that there are no lapses into cliche or convention, only the unfolding of ideas created in the moment."

== Track listing ==
Composed by Billy Bang.

1. "Yo! Ho Chi Minh Is in the House" – 10:25
2. "Moments for the KIAMIA" – 6:39
3. "Tunnel Rat (Flashlight and a 45)" – 9:32
4. "TET Offensive" – 8:57
5. "Bien Hoa Blues" – 6:42
6. "Mystery of the Mekong" – 10:01
7. "Fire in the Hole" – 7:03
8. "Saigon Phunk" – 11:59

== Personnel ==
- Billy Bang – violin
- Frank Lowe – tenor saxophone (tracks 4, 5, 8)
- Sonny Fortune – flute (tracks 7, 8)
- Ted Daniel – trumpet (tracks: 1, 3–5, 8)
- John Hicks – piano
- Curtis Lundy – double bass
- Michael Carvin – drums
- Ron Brown – percussion (tracks: 4, 6, 8)
- Butch Morris – conductor
