= Spirits Gathering =

Studio album by Billy Bang Quartet
- Released: 1996
- Recorded: February 28, 1996
- Studio: The Spirit Room, Rossie, New York
- Genre: Free jazz
- Length: 41:46
- Label: CIMP; 109

Billy Bang chronology
Joy (Within)! (1996)	Spirits Gathering (1996)	Forbidden Planet (1997)

Spirits Gathering is an album by the Billy Bang Quartet, led by violinist Bang, and featuring guitarist Brett Allen, double bassist Akira Ando, and drummer Denis Charles. It was recorded on February 28, 1996, at the Spirit Room in Rossie, New York, and was released later that year by the CIMP label.

== Reception ==
Professional ratings
Review scores
Source	Rating
AllMusic	4/5 stars
The Orlando Sentinel	5/5 stars
The Penguin Guide to Jazz Recordings	3/4 stars
The Virgin Encyclopedia of Jazz	3/5 stars

In a review for AllMusic, Scott Yanow wrote: "This is one of violinist Billy Bang's finest all-around recordings, and one of his most accessible. It is a bit surprising how successful the outing was, for the violinist had been evicted from his apartment the day before... Bang puts plenty of passion in his solos and is easily the dominant force... Recommended."

The authors of The Penguin Guide to Jazz Recordings stated: "Beset with technical problems, but an interesting enough date which never quite transcends its circumstances."

A reviewer for the Orlando Sentinel commented: "the music is wonderfully immediate. That's particularly gratifying when performances are as magical as these... Bang is generally considered an avant-gardist, but he shows that a sense of adventure and a sense of romance needn’t be musically exclusive."

== Track listing ==
1. "Tankō Bushi" (Traditional) – 6:41
2. "Spirits Gathering" (Billy Bang) – 8:15
3. "Pent Up House" (Sonny Rollins) – 9:13
4. "Das Ist Fur Dich" (Akira Ando) – 8:54
5. "Know Your Enemy" (Bilal A. Rahman, Billy Bang) – 11:07
6. "Softly, as in a Morning Sunrise" (Sigmund Romberg, Oscar Hammerstein II) – 7:08
7. "My Funny Valentine" (Richard Rodgers, Lorenz Hart) – 8:27
8. "Blues in E" (Traditional) – 6:19

== Personnel ==
- Billy Bang – violin
- Brett Allen – guitar
- Akira Ando – double bass
- Denis Charles – drums
