= Common Goal =

Studio album by String Trio of New York
- Released: 1981
- Recorded: November 12 & 13, 1981
- Genre: Jazz
- Length: 41:18
- Label: Black Saint
- Producer: Giancarlo Barigozzi

String Trio of New York chronology
Area Code 212 (1980)	Common Goal (1981)	Rebirth of a Feeling (1982)

Common Goal is the third album by American jazz group the String Trio of New York recorded in 1981 for the Italian Black Saint label.

== Reception ==
The Allmusic review awarded the album 4 stars.

Professional ratings
Review scores
Source	Rating
Allmusic	4/5 stars
The Penguin Guide to Jazz Recordings	3/4 stars

== Track listing ==
1. "Multiple Reasons" (John Lindberg) - 7:06
2. "Space Walk"(Billy Bang) - 7:50
3. "San San Nana" (Bang) - 5:50
4. "Between the Lines" (James Emery) - 6:56
5. "Common Goal" (Lindberg) - 6:04
6. "Extensions and Exceptions" (Emery) - 7:32
  - Recorded at Barigozzi Studio in Milano, Italy on November 12 & 13, 1981

== Personnel ==
- Billy Bang - violin, yokobue flute, gong
- James Emery - guitar
- John Lindberg - bass
