= String Trio of New York =

American jazz chamber ensemble

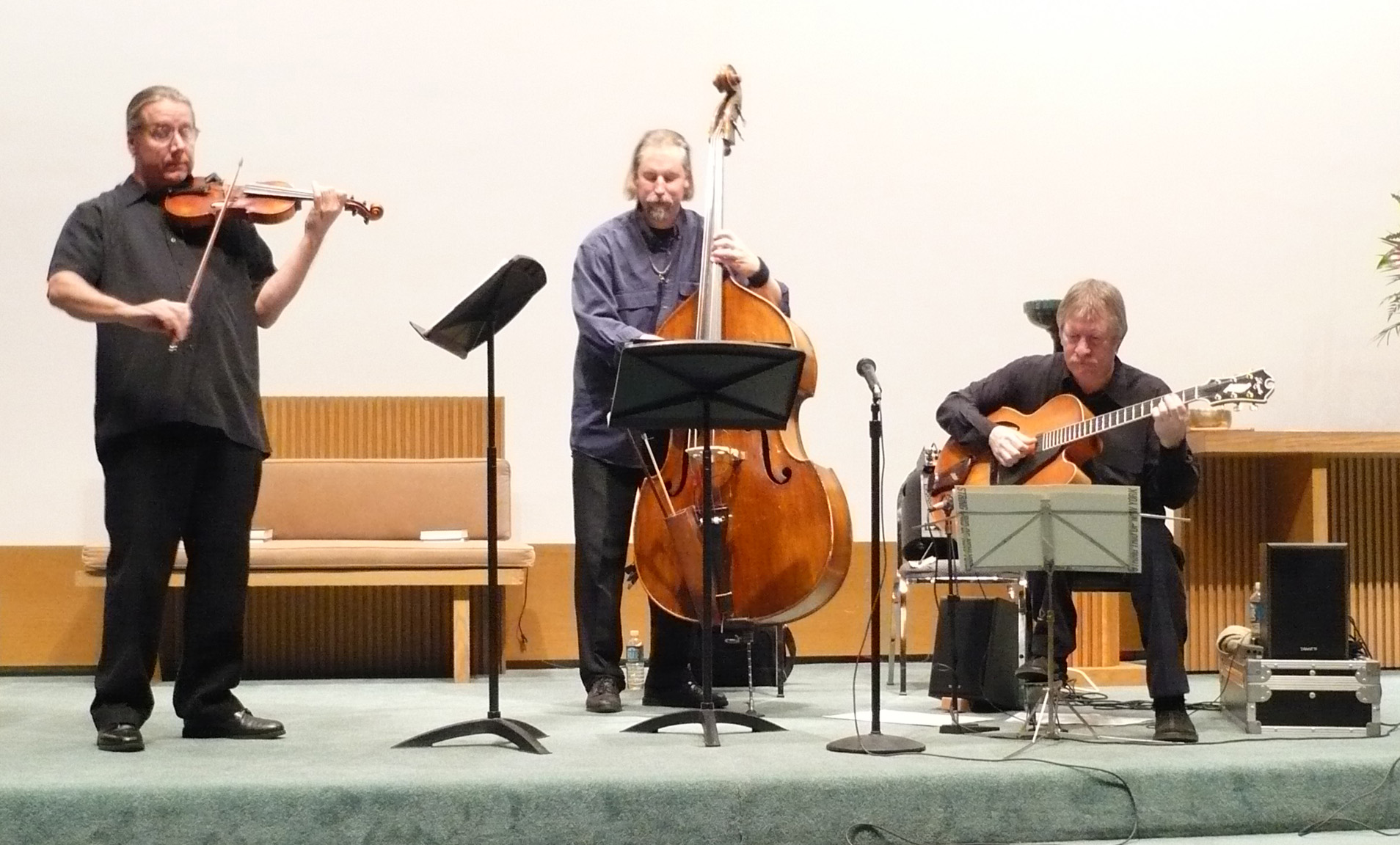
String Trio of New York in 2008

The String Trio of New York is an American jazz chamber ensemble.

The group was founded in 1977, by bassist John Lindberg, violinist Billy Bang, and guitarist James Emery. Though they initially worked on improvisational playing and on their own compositions, they eventually began taking on commissions, as well as doing arrangements of other jazz musicians' works. Their debut album was issued in 1979, and the group maintained the same line-up until May 1986, when Bang left and was replaced by Charles Burnham. Burnham was replaced by Regina Carter after his departure in 1991, who then left in the mid-1990s. Diane Monroe then joined the group through 2001, after which Rob Thomas joined.

== Discography ==
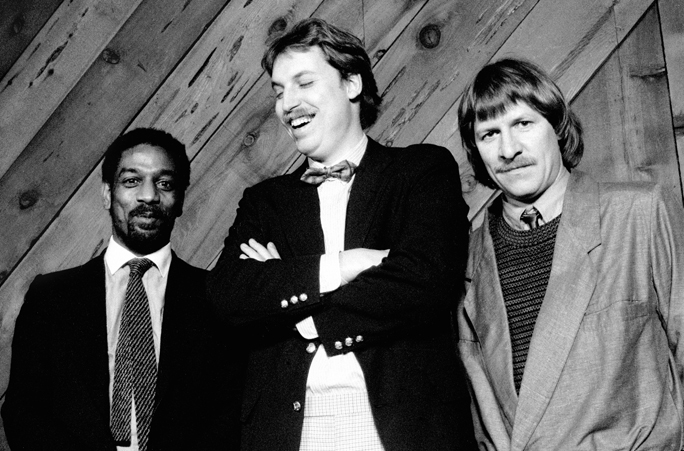
String Trio of New York in 1986. l.-r.: Billy Bang, John Lindberg, James Emery

- First String (Black Saint, 1979)
- Area Code 212 (Black Saint, 1981)
- Common Goal (Black Saint, 1983)
- Rebirth of a Feeling (Black Saint, 1983)
- Natural Balance (Black Saint, 1986)
- As Tears Go By (Newedition, 1987)
- String Trio of New York & Jay Clayton (West Wind, 1988)
- Time Never Lies (Vintage Jazz 1990)
- Ascendant (Stash, 1991)
- Intermobility (Arabesque, 1992)
- Octagon (Black Saint, 1992)
- Live Au Petit Faucheux (AA, 1993)
- Blues...? (Black Saint, 1993)
- An Outside Job (France 1993) (Radio France Tours, 1993)
- With Anthony Davis (Music & Arts, 1996)
- Faze Phour: A Twenty Year Retrospective (Black Saint, 1998)
- Gut Reaction (Omnitone, 2003)
- Frozen Ropes (with Oliver Lake) (Barking Hoop, 2005)
