= Bangception =

Live album by Billy Bang and Dennis Charles
- Released: 1983
- Recorded: August 29, 1982
- Venue: Jazz Festival Willisau, Switzerland
- Genre: Free jazz
- Length: 41:46
- Label: hat MUSICS; 3512 hatOLOGY; 517

Billy Bang chronology
Outline No. 12 (1983)	Bangception (1983)	The Fire from Within (1984)

Reissue cover

Bangception is a live album by violinist Billy Bang and drummer Dennis Charles. It was recorded on August 29, 1982, at the Jazz Festival Willisau in Willisau, Switzerland, and was released on vinyl in 1983 by the hat MUSICS label. In 1998, the album was reissued on CD with the title Bangception, Willisau 1982 on the hatOLOGY label.

== Reception ==
Professional ratings
Review scores
Source	Rating
AllMusic	4/5 stars
The Penguin Guide to Jazz on CD	3/4 stars
The Rolling Stone Jazz & Blues Album Guide	2/5 stars
Tom Hull – on the Web	B+
The Virgin Encyclopedia of Jazz	4/5 stars

In a review for AllMusic, Thom Jurek described the album as "a full frontal attack on the senses," with the musicians "crisscrossing back and forth over the great divide of improvisational phraseology." He wrote: "while it is true that this is a skeletal set, as full of space as it is 'music,' it is very satisfying nonetheless."

Harvey Pekar of JazzTimes called the duo's rendition of Ornette Coleman's "Lonely Woman" "one of the most unique and moving versions of the composition ever recorded," and praised Charles' contribution to the album, stating that he "is no junior partner here... he and Bang often engage in exchanges and dialogues. Charles does not function primarily as an accompanist."

Writing for All About Jazz, Robert Spencer commented: "Are you aware of what a total gas Billy Bang is? Are you aware of the wild swinging emotionalism of his playing, the fervor, the inventiveness, the classical sense of order and the freewheeling sense of adventure?... And then there is the vast and much-missed Denis Charles, a rhythmic wizard who proves here to be a superb foil for Bang's high-intensity string music-for-a-new-century violin explorations."

== Track listing ==
1. "Air Traffic Control" (Billy Bang, Dennis Charles) – 14:19
2. "Lonely Woman" (Ornette Coleman) – 6:13
3. "Thelonious" (Thelonious Monk) – 7:21
4. "Closer to the Flower" (Billy Bang) – 6:47
5. "Know Your Enemy" (Bilal A. Rahman) – 7:06

== Personnel ==
- Billy Bang – violin
- Dennis Charles – drums
