= Billy Bang =

American jazz violinist and composer (1947–2011)

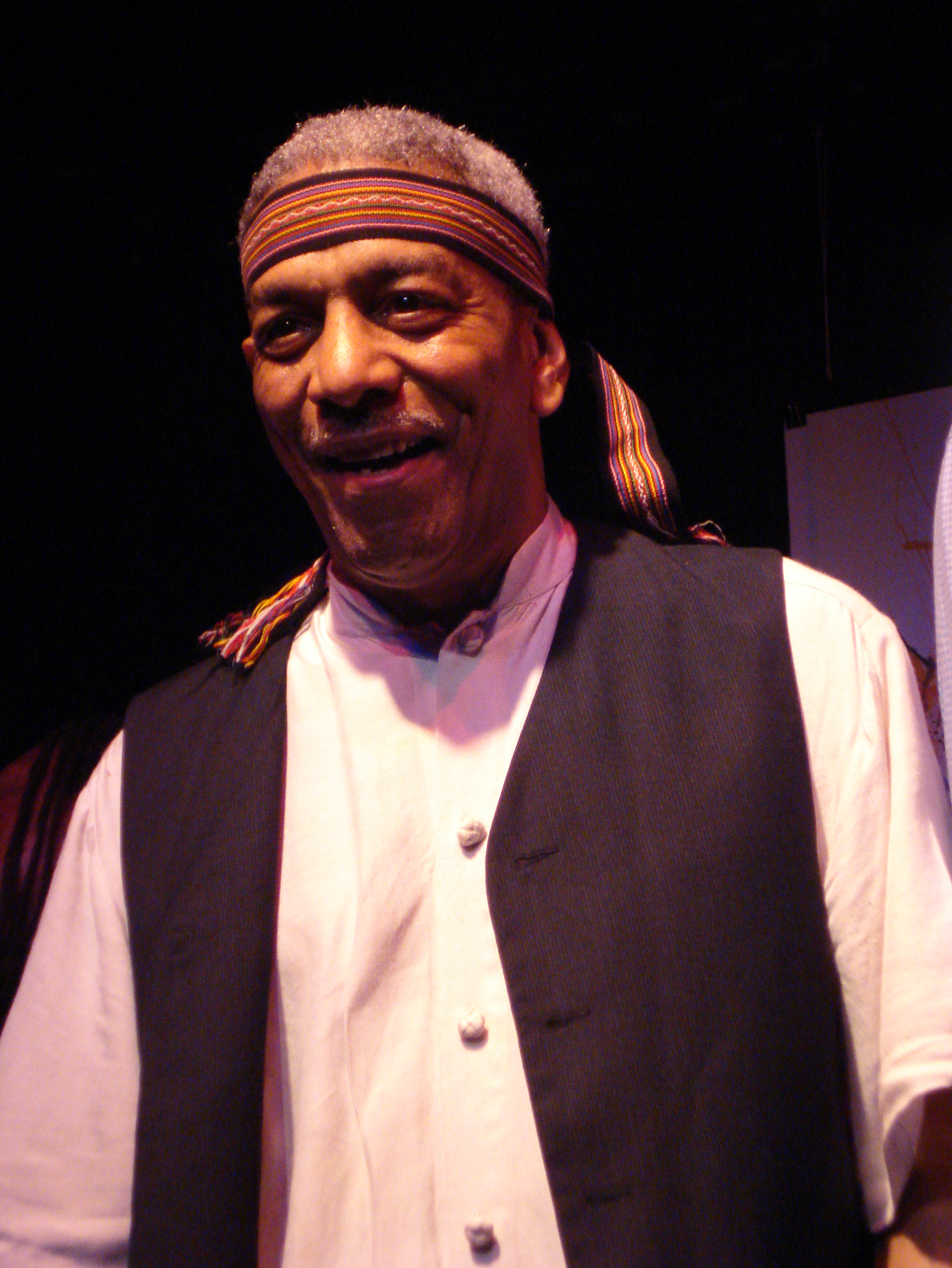
- Bang at Vision Festival XIII, June 11, 2008

Background information
- Born: William Vincent Walker; September 20, 1947; Mobile, Alabama, U.S.
- Died: April 11, 2011 (aged 63) Harlem, New York, U.S.
- Genres: Jazz, free jazz
- Occupations: Musician, composer
- Instrument: Violin
- Years active: 1972–2011
- Labels: Soul Note, Justin Time, CIMP, Hat hut, TUM

Billy Bang (September 20, 1947 – April 11, 2011), born William Vincent Walker, was an American free jazz violinist and composer.

== Biography ==
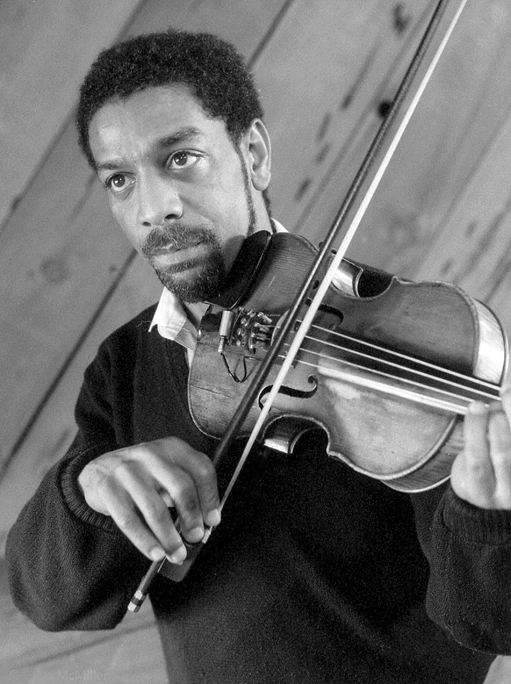
Bang at Bach Dancing & Dynamite Society, Half Moon Bay CA 8/24/86, w/William Parker, bass; Oscar Sanders, guitar; Zen Matsuura, drums

Bang's family moved to New York City's Bronx neighborhood while he was still an infant, and as a child he attended a special school for musicians in nearby Harlem. At that school, students were assigned instruments based on their physical size. Bang was fairly small, so he received a violin instead of either of his first choices, the saxophone or the drums. It was around this time that he acquired the nickname of "Billy Bang", derived from a popular cartoon character.

Bang studied the violin until he earned a hardship scholarship to the Stockbridge School in Stockbridge, Massachusetts, at which point he abandoned the instrument because the school did not have a music program. He had difficulty adjusting to life at the school, where he encountered racism and developed confusion about his identity, which he later blamed for his onset of schizophrenia. Bang felt that he had little in common with the largely privileged children at the school, who included Jackie Robinson, Jr. (son of baseball star Jackie Robinson) and Arlo Guthrie, and he struggled to reconcile the disparity between the wealth of the school and the poverty of his home in New York. He left the school after two years and attended a school in The Bronx. He did not graduate, decided not to return to school after receiving his draft papers, and at the age of 18, he was drafted into the United States Army.

Bang spent six months in basic training and another two weeks learning jungle warfare, arriving in South Vietnam just before the Tet Offensive. Starting out as an infantryman, he did one tour of combat duty, rising to the rank of sergeant before he mustered out.

After Bang returned from the war, his life lacked direction. The job he had held before the army had been filled in his absence. He pursued and then abandoned a law degree, before becoming politically active and falling in with an underground group of revolutionaries. The group recognized Bang's knowledge of weapons from his time in the Army, and they used him to procure firearms for the group during trips to Maryland and Virginia, buying from pawnshops and other small operators who did not conduct extensive background checks. During one of these trips, Bang spotted three violins hanging at the back of a pawnshop, and he impulsively purchased one.

He later joined Sun Ra's band. In 1977, Bang co-founded the String Trio of New York (with guitarist James Emery and double bassist John Lindberg). Bang explored his experience in Vietnam in two albums: Vietnam: The Aftermath (2001) and Vietnam: Reflections (2005), recorded with a band which included several other veterans of that war. The latter album also features two Vietnamese musicians based in the United States (voice and đàn tranh zither).

The film Billy Bang Lucky Man documents his return to Vietnam in 2008 to collaborate with Vietnamese musicians and come to terms with his experiences in the war. A soundtrack album was released in 2021.

Bang died on April 11, 2011. According to an associate, Bang had had lung cancer. He had been scheduled to perform on the opening day of the Xerox Rochester International Jazz Festival on June 10, 2011. He is buried at Woodlawn Cemetery, Bronx, New York.

== Discography ==
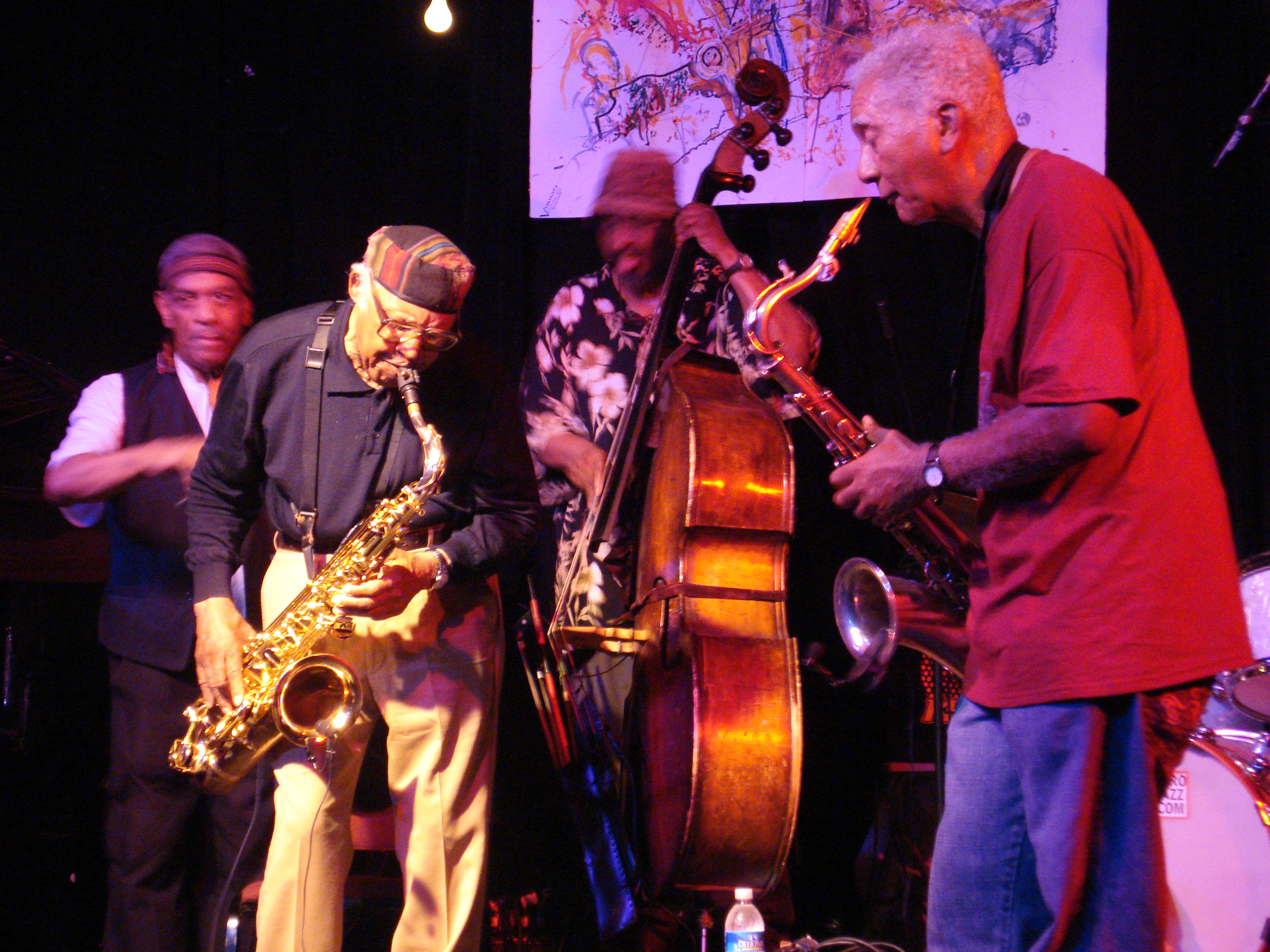
In 2008, with Fred Anderson, William Parker and Kidd Jordan

=== As leader or co-leader ===
- 1977: Black Man's Blues (NoBusiness 2011) with the Survival Ensemble
- 1978: New York Collage (& Survival Ensemble) (Anima Recs reissued as NoBusiness 2011)
- 1979: Distinction Without a Difference (hat Hut)
- 1979: Sweet Space (Anima)
- 1981: Changing Seasons (Bellows)
- 1981: Rainbow Gladiator (Soul Note)
- 1982: Untitled Gift (Anima, 1982)
- 1982: Invitation (Soul Note)
- 1982: Bangception (hat MUSICS, 1983) with Dennis Charles; reissued as Bangception, Willisau 1982 (hatOLOGY, 1998)
- 1982: Live at Green Space (Anima)
- 1983: Outline No. 12 (Celluloid)
- 1984: The Fire from Within (Soul Note)
- 1986: Live at Carlos 1 (Soul Note)
- 1991: Valve No. 10 (Soul Note)
- 1992: A Tribute to Stuff Smith (Soul Note)
- 1993: Hip Hop Be Bop (ITM)
- 1996: Joy (Within)! (Silkheart) with William Hooker
- 1996: Spirits Gathering (CIMP)
- 1997: Forbidden Planet (Masterplan)
- 1997: Bang On! (Justin Time)
- 1997: Commandment (For the Sculpture of Alain Kirili) (No More)
- 2000: Big Bang Theory (Justin Time)
- 2001: Vietnam: The Aftermath (Justin Time)
- 2004: Vietnam: Reflections (Justin Time)
- 2005: Configuration (Silkheart) with Sirone
- 2007: Above & Beyond: An Evening in Grand Rapids (Justin Time)
- 2009: Four Seasons - East meets West (Heart Lord Studio, Japan)
- 2010: Prayer for Peace (TUM)
- 2010: Billy Bang/Bill Cole (Shadrack)
- 2013: Da Bang! (TUM)
- 2014: Medicine Buddha (NoBusiness) with William Parker
- 2021: Lucky Man: Music from the Film (BBE)

With the String Trio of New York

- First String (Black Saint, 1979)
- Area Code 212 (Black Saint, 1980)
- Common Goal (Black Saint, 1983)
- Rebirth of a Feeling (Black Saint, 1983)
- Natural Balance (Black Saint, 1986)

With the FAB Trio (Joe Fonda / Barry Altschul / Bang)

- Transforming the Space (CIMP, 2003)
- Live at the Iron Works, Vancouver (Konnex, 2005)
- A Night in Paris (Live at the Sunset) (Marge, 2008)
- Live in Amsterdam (Porter, 2009)
- History of Jazz in Reverse (TUM, 2011)

=== As sideman ===
With Ahmed Abdullah

- Tara's Song (TUM, 2005)
- Traveling the Spaceways (Planet Arts, 2004)

With Marilyn Crispell

- Spirit Music (Cadence, 1983)

With Kahil El'Zabar

- Big Cliff (Delmark, 1995)
- The Power (CIMP, 2000)
- Spirits Entering (Delmark, 2001)
- If You Believe... (8th Harmonic Breakdown, 2002)
- Live at the River East Art Center (Delmark, 2005)
- Big M: A Tribute to Malachi Favors (Delmark, 2006)

With The Group (Ahmed Abdullah, Marion Brown, Bang, Sirone, Fred Hopkins, Andrew Cyrille)

- Live (recorded in 1986, issued in 2012 by NoBusiness Records)

With John Lindberg

- Dimension 5 (Black Saint, 1981)

With William Parker

- Through Acceptance of the Mystery Peace (Centering, 1980)
- Scrapbook (Thirsty Ear, 2003)
- Wood Flute Songs (AUM Fidelity, 2013)

With World Saxophone Quartet

- Experience (2004)
