= In the Light (Max Roach album) =

Studio album by Max Roach Quartet
- Released: 1982
- Recorded: July 22–23, 1982
- Genre: Jazz
- Length: 41:46
- Label: Soul Note
- Producer: Giovanni Bonandrini

Max Roach chronology
Swish (1982)	In the Light (1982)	Live at Vielharmonie (1983)

In the Light is an album by American jazz drummer Max Roach, recorded in 1982 for the Italian Soul Note label.

== Reception ==
The AllMusic review by Ron Wynn stated: "This is one of a series of excellent recordings by the Roach 4tet in the early '80s that should be examined as not only excellent works, but perhaps even trend setters for a more progressive concept".

Professional ratings
Review scores
Source	Rating
AllMusic	4/5 stars
The Penguin Guide to Jazz Recordings	3/4 stars
The Rolling Stone Jazz Record Guide	3/5 stars

== Track listing ==
All compositions by Max Roach except as indicated

1. "In the Light" - 8:40
2. "Straight, No Chaser" (Thelonious Monk) - 7:00
3. "Ruby, My Dear" (Monk) - 4:53
4. "Henry Street Blues" - 4:48
5. "If You Could See Me Now" (Tadd Dameron, Carl Sigman) - 4:27
6. "Good Bait" (Count Basie, Dameron) - 7:38
7. "Tricotism" (Oscar Pettiford) - 4:20

- Recorded at Barigozzi Studio in Milano, Italy on July 22 & 23, 1982

== Personnel ==
- Max Roach - drums
- Cecil Bridgewater - trumpet, flugelhorn (tracks 1–4, 6 & 7)
- Odean Pope - tenor saxophone
- Calvin Hill - bass
