= A Tribute to Stuff Smith =

Studio album by Billy Bang
- Released: 1992
- Recorded: September 20, 21 & 22, 1992
- Genre: Jazz
- Length: 42:45
- Label: Soul Note
- Producer: Flavio Bonandrini

Billy Bang chronology
Valve No. 10 (1988)	A Tribute to Stuff Smith (1992)	Hip Hop Be Bop (1993)

A Tribute to Stuff Smith is an album by the American jazz violinist Billy Bang recorded in 1992. The album was released on the Italian Soul Note label and features songs written by or associated with violinist Stuff Smith (1909-1967). Bang is supported by pianist and former Smith collaborator Sun Ra (in a rare sideman appearance), bassist John Ore and drummer Andrew Cyrille.

== Reception ==
Professional ratings
Review scores
Source	Rating
AllMusic	4/5 stars
The Penguin Guide to Jazz Recordings	3/4 stars
The Virgin Encyclopedia of Jazz	4/5 stars
The Rolling Stone Jazz & Blues Album Guide	3/5 stars
Tom Hull – on the Web	A−

The editors of AllMusic awarded the album 4 stars, and reviewer Scott Yanow wrote: "Ra was a bit hemmed in by the concept, and his conception of time was different than Bang's, so there is a certain amount of tension in the music. Also, Billy Bang has a much rougher sound and a freer style than Stuff Smith, but the end results are well worth hearing".

The authors of The Penguin Guide to Jazz Recordings praised Cyrille's contribution, stating that he is "the key element, constantly suggesting new routes, changing the pace, lying back almost out of the picture, and then erupting in with another flurry of ideas."

Critic Tom Hull assigned the album a rating of "A−", commenting: "Not breathtaking, but certainly a delight."

Robert Spencer of All About Jazz remarked: "Although the choice of material here is made up entirely of tunes Stuff Smith played... Bang and Sun Ra... make them new in the best tradition of jazz."

== Track listing ==
1. "Only Time Will Tell" (Stuff Smith) - 5:33
2. "Satin Doll" (Duke Ellington, Johnny Mercer, Billy Strayhorn) - 8:01
3. "Deep Purple" (Peter DeRose, Mitchell Parish) - 6:24
4. "Bugle Blues" (Smith) - 2:52
5. "A Foggy Day" (George Gershwin, Ira Gershwin) - 3:58
6. "April in Paris" (Vernon Duke, E. Y. Harburg) - 5:18
7. "Lover Man" (Jimmy Davis, Ram Ramirez, James Sherman) - 6:27
8. "Yesterdays" (Otto Harbach, Jerome Kern) - 4:12
  - Recorded at Sear Sound in New York City on September 20, 21 & 22, 1992

== Personnel ==
- Billy Bang - violin
- Sun Ra - piano
- John Ore – bass
- Andrew Cyrille – drums
