= Octagon (String Trio of New York album) =

Studio album by String Trio of New York
- Released: 1992
- Recorded: November 5 & 6, 1992
- Genre: Jazz
- Length: 69:12
- Label: Black Saint
- Producer: Giovanni Bonandrini

String Trio of New York chronology
Intermobility (1992)	Octagon (1992)	Live Au Petit Faucheux (1993)

Octagon is an album by American jazz group the String Trio of New York recorded in 1992 for the Italian Black Saint label.

== Reception ==
The Allmusic review awarded the album 4½ stars.

Professional ratings
Review scores
Source	Rating
Allmusic	4.5/5 stars
The Penguin Guide to Jazz Recordings	3.5/4 stars

== Track listing ==
1. "The Pursuit of Happiness" (James Emery) - 7:05
2. "One for Robin" (Marty Ehrlich) - 5:28
3. "Strings and Things" (Muhal Richard Abrams) - 7:19
4. "Circular Views" (John Lindberg) - 7:42
5. "Upside the Downside" (Mark Helias) - 13:09
6. "Forever February" (Regina Carter) - 7:11
7. "Billie: The Queen of Holiday" (Wadada Leo Smith) - 13:06
8. "A Short History of the Balkans" (Bobby Previte) - 8:12

- Recorded at Barigozzi Studio in Milano, Italy on November 5 & 6, 1992

== Personnel ==
- Regina Carter - violin
- James Emery - guitar
- John Lindberg - bass
