= John Lindberg (jazz musician) =

American musician (born 1959)

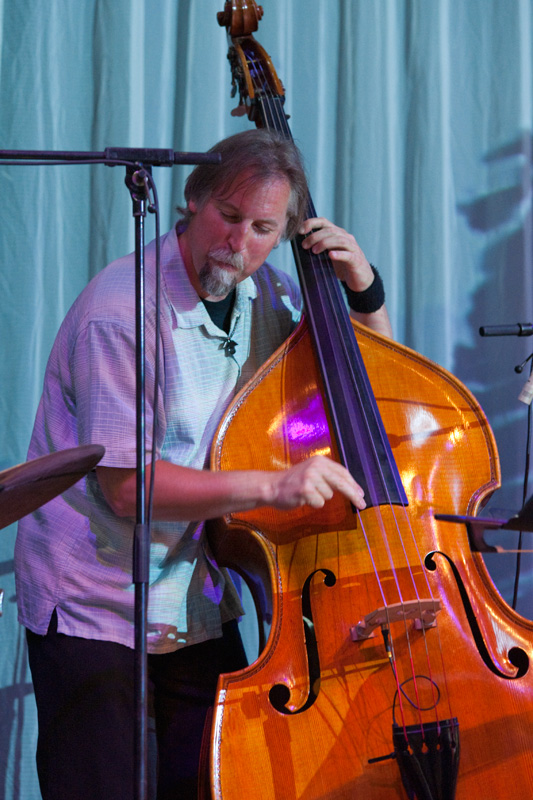
- John Lindberg, mœrs festival 2010

Background information
- Born: March 16, 1959 (age 67); Royal Oak, Michigan, US
- Genres: Jazz
- Occupation: Musician
- Instrument: Double bass
- Years active: 1977–present
- Label: Black Saint
- Website: johnlindberg.com

John Lindberg (born March 16, 1959) is an American jazz double-bassist.

== Early life ==
Lindberg was born in Royal Oak, Michigan. He began his professional career at the age of 16, eventually moving to New York City in 1977.

== Career ==
After moving to New York, he played with the Human Arts Ensemble alongside Joseph Bowie and Bobo Shaw. In 1977, with James Emery and Billy Bang, Lindberg co-founded the String Trio of New York. In 1980 he formed a trio with Jimmy Lyons and Sunny Murray. From 1980 to 1983 he lived in Paris, playing there solo and with Murray and John Tchicai. He has recorded extensively as a leader. John Lindberg studied bass with the bassist from the Battle Creek, Michigan symphony orchestra, bassist David Izenzon and jazz musician Roscoe Mitchell.

== Discography ==
=== As leader ===
- Comin' and Goin (Leo, 1980)
- Unison (Cecma, 1981) with Marty Ehrlich
- Dimension 5 (Black Saint, 1981)
- Team Work (Cecma, 1982) - with Hugh Ragin
- Relative Reliability (West Wind, 1982)
- Give and Take (Black Saint, 1982)
- Haunt of the Unresolved (Nato, 1983)
- The East Side Suite (Sound Aspects. 1983)
- Trilogy of Works for Eleven Instrumentalists (Black Saint, 1984)
- As Tears Go By (ITM, 1987)
- Shoot First (Ear Rational, 1989) with Eric Watson
- Dodging Bullets (Black Saint, 1992)
- Quartet Afterstorm (Black Saint, 1994)
- Resurrection of a Dormant Soul (Black Saint, 1996)
- Luminosity:Homage to David Izenzon (Music & Arts, 1996)
- Bounce (Black Saint, 1998)
- The Catbird Sings (Black Saint, 2000)
- A Tree Frog Tonality (Between the lines, 2000)
- Two by Five (Between the lines, 2002)
- Ruminations Upon Ives and Gottschalk (Between the lines, 2003)
- Winter Birds (Between the lines, 2005)
- Duets 1 (Between the lines, 2006) with Karl Berger
- (A)live at Roulette, NYC (Jazzwerkstatt, 2011)
- Born in an Urban Ruin (Clean Feed, 2016) (& BC3)
- Western Edges (Clean Feed, 2016) (wRaptor Trio)

With the String Trio of New York

- First String (Black Saint, 1979)
- Area Code 212 (Black Saint, 1981)
- Common Goal (Black Saint, 1983)
- Rebirth of a Feeling (Black Saint, 1983)
- Natural Balance (Black Saint, 1986)
- Octagon (Black Saint, 1992)
- Blues...? (Black Saint, 1993)
- Frozen Ropes (Barking Hoop, 2005)

=== As sideman ===
With Anthony Braxton

- Creative Orchestra (Köln) 1978 (hatART, 1978 [1995])
- Performance (Quartet) 1979 (hatART, 1979 [1981])
- Seven Compositions 1978 (Moers Music, 1979)
- Six Duets (1982) (Cecma, 1982)
- Four Compositions (Quartet) 1983 (Black Saint, 1983)
- Six Compositions (Quartet) 1984 (Black Saint, 1984)
- Prag 1984 (Quartet Performance) (Sound Aspects, 1984)
- Orchestra (Paris) 1978 (Braxton Bootleg, 2011)
- Quartet (Wilhelmshaven) 1979 - Part 1 (Braxton Bootleg, 2012)
- Quartet (Wilhelmshaven) 1979 - Part 2 (Braxton Bootleg, 2012)
- Quartet (Mulhouse) 1983 (Braxton Bootleg, 2012)
- Quartet (Sweet Basil) 1985 - 02.11 (Braxton Bootleg, 2013)
- Quartet (Salzburg) 1985 - 05.19 (Braxton Bootleg, 2014)

With Human Arts Ensemble

- Junk Trap (Black Saint, 1978)
- Live! Volume 1 (Circle, 1978)

With Susie Ibarra

- Flower by Flower (Tzadik, 2002)

With Jimmy Lyons and Sunny Murray

- Jump Up / What to Do About (Hat Hut, 1981)

With Kevin Norton

- Intuitive Structures (Cadence, 2003)
- Time-Space Modulator (Barking Hoop, 2004)

With Wadada Leo Smith

- Lake Biwa (Tzadik, 2004)
- Eclipse (La Huit, 2005)
- Tabligh (Cuneiform, 2008)
- Spiritual Dimensions (Cuneiform, 2009)
- Heart's Reflections (Cuneiform, 2011)
- Ten Freedom Summers (Cuneiform, 2012)
- Occupy The World (TUM, 2013)
- The Great Lakes Suites (TUM, 2014)
- Celestial Weather (TUM, 2015)
- America's National Parks (Cuneiform, 2016)
- The Chicago Symphonies (TUM, 2021)

With BLOB

- "The Awakening" (2007) (with Ted Orr, Bill Bacon, Don Davis and Karl Berger)
- "Halloween" (Clinical Archives 2008) (with Ted Orr and Harvey Sorgen)
- "Quantum Fugue" (Lindy Editions 2008) (with Ted Orr and Harvey Sorgen)
- "Earphonious Swamphony" (Innova Recordings 2009) (with Ted Orr, Harvey Sorgen, and Ralph Carney)
- "You Can'y Get Ther From There" (Lindy Editions 2009) (with Ted Orr and Harvey Sorgen)
- "A Night At The Opera" (2010) (with Ted Orr, Jake Sorgen, and Harvey Sorgen)
- "Metalshop" (2010) (with Ted Orr and Harvey Sorgen)
- "BLOB Goes To Mars" (2011) (with Ted Orr, Harvey Sorgen, Don Davis, and Mars Williams)
- Third Ear" (2011) (with Ted Orr, Harvey Sorgen, and Curtis Bahn)
- "Summer Shorts" (2012) (with Ted Orr and Harvey Sorgen)
