= Invitation (Billy Bang album) =

Studio album by Billy Bang Quintet
- Released: 1982
- Recorded: April 13–14, 1982
- Studio: Barigozzi Studios, Milano, Italy
- Genre: Free jazz
- Length: 38:00
- Label: Soul Note; SN 1036
- Producer: Giovanni Bonandrini

Billy Bang chronology
Untitled Gift (1982)	Invitation (1982)	Outline No. 12 (1983)

Invitation is an album by the Billy Bang Quintet, led by violinist Bang, and featuring saxophonist Charles Tyler, pianist Curtis Clark, double bassist Wilber Morris, and drummer Dennis Charles. It was recorded on April 13–14, 1982, at Barigozzi Studios in Milano, Italy, and was released later that year by the Soul Note label.

== Reception ==
Professional ratings
Review scores
Source	Rating
AllMusic	3/5 stars
The Penguin Guide to Jazz Recordings	3/4 stars
The Rolling Stone Jazz Record Guide	3/5 stars
The Virgin Encyclopedia of Jazz	3/5 stars

Writing for The Rolling Stone Jazz Record Guide, Fred Goodman noted that Invitation, on which Bang's "depth as a composer, leader and instrumentalist [is] most in evidence," is "characterized by an unorthodox swing and will appeal to more traditionally minded listeners through [its] strong dedication to melody and rhythm."

Author Stuart Nicholson praised the recording's "strong memorable themes," calling it "possibly [Bang's] best album of the '80s."

The authors of The Penguin Guide to Jazz Recordings singled out Clark's contribution, describing him as "an excellent player and idiosyncratic enough not to leave a hole," but, overall, called the album "disappointing," commenting: "there is nothing very distinctive about any of the music, and Bang's own playing seems lacklustre and formulaic."

== Track listing ==
1. "An Addition to Tradition" (Billy Bang) – 7:22
2. "A Pebble is a Small Rock" (Billy Bang, Curtis Clark) – 9:14
3. "In a Minute" (Billy Bang) – 1:10
4. "A Minute Later" (Billy Bang) – 1:04
5. "Invitation" (Bronislaw Kaper, Ned Washington) – 7:50
6. "Secret Society" (Billy Bang) – 5:44
7. "Loverman" (Jimmy Davis, Roger Ramirez, Jimmy Sherman) – 5:36

== Personnel ==
- Billy Bang – violin
- Charles Tyler – alto saxophone, baritone saxophone
- Curtis Clark – piano
- Wilber Morris – double bass
- Dennis Charles – drums
