= Give and Take (John Lindberg album) =

Studio album by John Lindberg
- Released: 1982
- Recorded: November 13 & 14, 1982
- Genre: Jazz
- Length: 41:15
- Label: Black Saint
- Producer: Giovanni Bonandrini

John Lindberg chronology
Relative Reliability (1982)	Give and Take (1982)	The East Side Suite (1983)

Give and Take is an album by American jazz double-bassist John Lindberg, George E. Lewis and Barry Altschul, recorded in 1982 for the Italian Black Saint label.

== Reception ==
The AllMusic review awarded the album four stars. The Penguin Guide to Jazz awarded it three and a half out of four stars, calling it "the one to go for" out of Lindberg's discography.

Professional ratings
Review scores
Source	Rating
Allmusic	4/5 stars
The Penguin Guide to Jazz	3.5/4 stars

== Track listing ==
All compositions by John Lindberg except as indicated

1. "Give and Take" - 6:52
2. "Float" - 7:14
3. "Be Out S'cool" (Barry Altschul) - 5:59
4. "Shunk-Shank" - 6:12
5. "Stick Figures" (George Lewis) - 7:28
6. "Drift" - 7:30

- Recorded at Barigozzi Studio in Milano, Italy, on November 13 and 14, 1982

== Personnel ==
- John Lindberg – bass
- George E. Lewis – trombone
- Barry Altschul – drums, berimbau, marimba, tympani
