= The Fire from Within =

Studio album by Billy Bang Sextet
- Released: 1984
- Recorded: September 19 & 29, 1984
- Genre: Jazz
- Length: 47:04
- Label: Soul Note
- Producer: Giovanni Bonandrini

Billy Bang chronology
Bangception (1983)	The Fire from Within (1984)	Live at Carlos 1 (1986)

The Fire from Within is an album by the American jazz violinist Billy Bang, recorded in 1984 and released on the Italian Soul Note label.

== Reception ==
Professional ratings
Review scores
Source	Rating
AllMusic	4.5/5 stars
The Penguin Guide to Jazz Recordings	3.5/4 stars
The Rolling Stone Jazz & Blues Album Guide	3.5/5 stars
The Virgin Encyclopedia of Jazz	4/5 stars

The editors of AllMusic awarded the album 4½ stars, and reviewer Stephen Cook stated that it "nicely shows off the violinist's unique approach to post-bop jazz from swingers to ballads, trad to free... A perfect entrée for Billy Bang newcomers".

The authors of The Penguin Guide to Jazz Recordings wrote: "The combination of trumpet, guitar and percussion makes an effective foil for Bang's grainy lines... The sheer woodiness of the sound... is beguiling, and the melodic and rhythmic language rich."

The Washington Post's Geoffrey Himes called Bang "a remarkable composer," and commented: "One can hear in the music a struggle to reach beyond the obvious for something new."

A writer for the Los Angeles Times praised the album's "appealing, lightly textured sound," and stated that it "stands as a strong blend of tradition and experimentation."

== Track listing ==
All compositions by Billy Bang

1. "The Glow of Awareness" - 5:38
2. "The Nagual Julian" - 5:46
3. "The Shift Below" - 6:24
4. "Petty Tyrants" - 5:32
5. "The New Seers" - 10:41
6. "The Mold of Man" - 7:34
7. "Inorganic Beings" - 5:29

- Recorded at Vanguard Studios in New York City on September 19 & 29, 1984

== Personnel ==
- Billy Bang - violin
- Ahmed Abdullah - trumpet
- Oscar Sanders - guitar
- William Parker – bass
- Thurman Barker - marimba
- John Betsch – drums, cowbells
- Charles Bobo Shaw - cowbells (track 2)
