= Live at Carlos 1 =

Studio album by Billy Bang Sextet
- Released: 1986
- Recorded: November 23, 1986
- Genre: Jazz
- Length: 46:20
- Label: Soul Note
- Producer: Giovanni Bonandrini

Billy Bang chronology
The Fire from Within (1984)	Live at Carlos 1 (1986)	Valve No. 10 (1988)

Live at Carlos 1 is a live album by the American jazz violinist Billy Bang recorded in 1986 and released on the Italian Soul Note label.

== Reception ==
Professional ratings
Review scores
Source	Rating
AllMusic	4.5/5 stars
The Penguin Guide to Jazz Recordings	3/4 stars
The Virgin Encyclopedia of Jazz	3/5 stars
The Rolling Stone Jazz & Blues Album Guide	3.5/5 stars

The editors of AllMusic awarded the album 4½ stars, and reviewer Scott Yanow stated: "this melodic avant-garde set rewards repeated listenings and has an impressive amount of variety".

The authors of The Penguin Guide to Jazz Recordings stated that the album "underlines the distinctiveness" of the group, but cautioned that it has "a slightly plodding quality."

== Track listing ==
All compositions by Billy Bang

1. "Thank You Ma'am" - 8:33
2. "Sinawe Mandelas" - 6:57
3. "Sad Song" - 4:37
4. "Abuella" - 13:40
5. "Rainbow Gladiator" - 5:48
6. "Going Through" - 6:45

- Recorded at Carlos 1 in New York City on November 23, 1986

== Personnel ==
- Billy Bang - violin
- Roy Campbell - trumpet
- Oscar Sanders - guitar
- William Parker – bass
- Thurman Barker - marimba
- Zen Matsuura – drums
- Eddie Conde - congas (track 4)
