= Scott Free (album) =

Studio album by Max Roach Quartet
- Released: 1985
- Recorded: May 31, 1984
- Genre: Jazz
- Length: 40:15
- Label: Soul Note
- Producer: Giovanni Bonandrini

Max Roach chronology
Live at Vielharmonie (1983)	Scott Free (1985)	It's Christmas Again (1984)

Scott Free is an album by American jazz drummer Max Roach, recorded in 1984 for the Italian Soul Note label.

== Reception ==
The AllMusic review by Scott Yanow stated: "This is excellent music, easily recommended as an example of the underrated but consistently brilliant Max Roach Quartet".

Professional ratings
Review scores
Source	Rating
AllMusic	3.5/5 stars
The Penguin Guide to Jazz Recordings	3/4 stars

== Track listing ==
All compositions by Cecil Bridgewater

1. "Scott Free Part 1" - 19:58
2. "Scott Free Part 2" - 20:17

- Recorded at Barigozzi Studio in Milano, Italy on May 31, 1984

== Personnel ==
- Max Roach - drums
- Cecil Bridgewater - trumpet, flugelhorn
- Odean Pope - tenor saxophone
- Tyrone Brown - bass guitar
