= Four Compositions (Quartet) 1983 =

Studio album by Anthony Braxton
- Released: 1983
- Recorded: March 9–10, 1983
- Genre: Jazz
- Length: 41:22
- Label: Black Saint
- Producer: Giovanni Bonandrini

Anthony Braxton chronology
Solo (Pisa) 1982 (1982)	Four Compositions (Quartet) 1983 (1983)	Composition 113 (1983)

Four Compositions (Quartet) 1983 is an album by American saxophonist and composer Anthony Braxton recorded in 1983 for the Italian Black Saint label.

== Reception ==
The Allmusic review awarded the album 4 stars.

Professional ratings
Review scores
Source	Rating
Allmusic	4/5 stars

== Track listing ==
All compositions by Anthony Braxton.

1. "Composition No. 105 a" – 20:02
2. "Composition No. 69 M" – 7:14
3. "Composition No. 69 O" – 8:43
4. "Composition No. 69 Q" – 5:23
- Recorded at Barigozzi Studio in Milano, Italy on March 9 & 10, 1983

== Personnel ==
- Anthony Braxton – alto saxophone, soprano saxophone, clarinet
- George E. Lewis – trombone
- John Lindberg – bass
- Gerry Hemingway – percussion
