= Open Aspects '82 =

Studio album by Anthony Braxton and Richard Teitelbaum
- Released: 1982
- Recorded: March 18, 1982
- Studio: Tonstudio Bauer, Ludwigsburg, West Germany
- Genre: Jazz
- Length: 73:18
- Label: hat ART; ART 1995/96
- Producer: Pia & Werner X. Uehlinger

Anthony Braxton chronology
Six Compositions: Quartet (1981)	Open Aspects '82 (1982)	Six Duets (1982) (1982)

Open Aspects '82 is an album by saxophonist/composer/improviser Anthony Braxton and electronic musician Richard Teitelbaum which was recorded in 1982 and originally released on the hat ART label as a double LP and rereleased on CD in 1993 as Open Aspects (Duo) 1982.

== Reception ==
Professional ratings
Review scores
Source	Rating
AllMusic	4/5 stars
The Rolling Stone Jazz Record Guide	3/5 stars

The AllMusic review by Brian Olewnick stated that "the musical results are first rate and always warmly imaginative. his approach is refreshingly nonacademic and both musician's pure enjoyment and listening ability is readily apparent. Though there is little reference to jazz traditions, there is a lovely nod to Riley-esque minimalism in some tracks and a surging piece riding high on waves of synthesized propulsion that's as close to rock as Braxton's ever likely to come. For listeners interested in this facet of the artist's musical world (the interaction with electronics) this is a vital release, but it's also a fine example of one of the points of merger between the jazz and classical avant-garde."

== Track listing ==
All compositions by Anthony Braxton and Richard Teitelbaum.

1. "Open Aspect #3" - 12:43
2. "Open Aspect #1.2" - 7:51
3. "Open Aspect #2" - 13:50
4. "Open Aspect #4" - 5:33
5. "Open Aspect #5" - 10:24
6. "Open Aspect #6" - 7:29
7. "Open Aspect #1.1" - 15:28

== Personnel ==
- Anthony Braxton - alto saxophone, sopranino saxophone
- Richard Teitelbaum - Moog synthesizer, microcomputer
