= Composition 113 =

Studio album by Anthony Braxton
- Released: 1984
- Recorded: December 6, 1983
- Studio: Tonstudio Zuckerfabrik, Stuttgart, Germany
- Genre: Jazz
- Length: 37:28
- Label: Sound Aspects; SAS 003
- Producer: Pedro de Freitas

Anthony Braxton chronology
Four Compositions (Quartet) 1983 (1983)	Composition 113 (1984)	Six Compositions (Quartet) 1984 (1984)

Composition 113 is a solo album by composer Anthony Braxton featuring his title piece, for one soloist, a large photograph, and prepared stage, which was released on the Sound Aspects label in 1984.

== Reception ==
Professional ratings
Review scores
Source	Rating
Allmusic	4/5 stars

The Allmusic review by Brian Olewnick stated "Composition 113 is not nearly as forbidding or difficult as one might guess at first blush, given its ascetic instrumentation. Braxton's tone is rich and luscious throughout and he freely draws on both blues and romanticism, making this one of his more accessible solo forays. Highly recommended".

== Track listing ==
All compositions by Anthony Braxton

1. "Composition 113 (For One Soloist, A Large Photograph, And Prepared Stage)":
  1. "Section 1" – 7:47
  2. "Section 2" – 7:27
  3. "Section 3" – 5:07
  4. "Section 4" – 6:47
  5. "Section 5" – 5:35
  6. "Section 6" – 4:45

== Personnel ==
- Anthony Braxton – E♭ soprano saxophone
