= Outline No. 12 =

Studio album by Billy Bang
- Released: 1983
- Recorded: July 1982
- Studio: OAO Studio, Brooklyn, New York
- Genre: Free jazz
- Length: 39:32
- Label: Celluloid; CELL 5004

Billy Bang chronology
Invitation (1982)	Outline No. 12 (1983)	Bangception (1983)

Outline No. 12 is an album by Billy Bang. Featuring three ensemble works composed by Bang and conducted by Lawrence "Butch" Morris, it was recorded during July 1982 at OAO Studio in Brooklyn, New York, and was released on vinyl in 1983 by Celluloid Records. In 2017, it was reissued in digital/remastered form by Bill Laswell. On the album, Bang is heard on violin, and he is joined by clarinetists Charles Tyler, Henri Warner, and David Murray, saxophonist Frank Lowe, violinists Jason Hwang and Joseph Hailes, vibraphonist Khan Jamal, double bassist Wilber Morris, and percussionists John "Khuwana" Fuller and Sunny Murray.

In the album liner notes, Bang described the compositions as "some of the most adventurous and challenging I have done to date," and noted: "It was my good fortune to know the musicians personally before we undertook this project. This enabled me to write within the range of the musicians' personalities. This concept is not new, it has been used by composers and arrangers from Duke Ellington to Sun Ra, but it does allow an effective musical vision to develop."

== Reception ==
Professional ratings
Review scores
Source	Rating
AllMusic	3/5 stars
MusicHound Jazz	3.5/5 stars
The Rolling Stone Jazz Record Guide	4/5 stars
The Virgin Encyclopedia of Jazz	3/5 stars

In a review for AllMusic, Ron Wynn called the album "fine" and "animated," and commented: "The songs on this set weren't gentle, demure or bluesy; they were explosive, searching, and combative and, as such, were ideal for Bang's sawing effects and sweeping solos."

Writing for The Rolling Stone Jazz Record Guide, Fred Goodman described the album as "a challenging set featuring extraordinary instrumentation … which creates an unusual and impressive effect."

Elsewhere's Graham Reid stated: "Most of this is written but Bang creates such odd arrangements, collisions, space and tones that it sounds... like free playing by musicians with a keen ear for each other. He's perhaps not wrong when he describes the piece 'Seeing Together' as taking us through 'a land of controlled folly'."

== Track listing ==
Composed by Billy Bang.

1. "Seeing Together" – 13:29
2. "Outline No. 12" – 7:01
3. "Conception" – 19:01

== Personnel ==
- Billy Bang – violin
- Lawrence "Butch" Morris – conductor
- Charles Tyler – B♭ clarinet
- Henri Warner – alto clarinet
- David Murray – bass clarinet
- Frank Lowe – soprano saxophone
- Jason Hwang – violin
- Joseph Hailes – violin
- Khan Jamal – vibraphone
- Wilber Morris – double bass
- John "Khuwana" Fuller – percussion
- Sunny Murray – percussion
