= Survivors (Max Roach album) =

Studio album by Max Roach
- Released: 1984
- Recorded: October 19, 20 & 21, 1984
- Genre: Jazz
- Length: 42:37
- Label: Soul Note
- Producer: Max Roach

Max Roach chronology
Collage (1984)	Survivors (1984)	Easy Winners (1985)

Survivors is an album by American jazz drummer Max Roach recorded in 1984 for the Italian Soul Note label.

== Reception ==
The Allmusic review by Ron Wynn awarded the album 3 stars stating "this serves as a powerful reminder of why Roach's drumming was so strong and visceral even in his older years, and how fertile his imagination continued to be".

Professional ratings
Review scores
Source	Rating
Allmusic	3/5 stars
The Penguin Guide to Jazz Recordings	3.5/4 stars

== Track listing ==
All compositions by Max Roach except as indicated

1. "Survivors" (Peter Phillips, Max Roach) - 21:28
2. "The Third Eye" - 2:10
3. "Billy the Kid" - 2:57
4. "JasMe" - 3:37
5. "The Drum Also Waltzes" - 3:18
6. "Sassy Max (Self Portrait)" - 3:20
7. "The Smoke That Thunders" - 5:47

- Recorded at Vanguard Studios in New York City on October 19, 20 & 21, 1984

== Personnel ==
- Max Roach - drums, percussion
- Guillermo Figueroa, Donald Bauch - violin (track 1)
- Louise Schulman - viola (track 1)
- Christopher Finckel - cello (track 1)
