= Live at Vielharmonie =

Live album by Max Roach Double Quartet
- Released: 1985
- Recorded: November 7, 1983
- Genre: Jazz
- Length: 38:31
- Label: Soul Note
- Producer: Max Roach

Max Roach chronology
In the Light (1982)	Live at Vielharmonie (1985)	Scott Free (1984)

Live at Vielharmonie is a live album by American jazz drummer Max Roach recorded in 1983 in Munich for the Italian Soul Note label.

== Reception ==
The Allmusic review awarded the album 2½ stars.

Professional ratings
Review scores
Source	Rating
Allmusic	2.5/5 stars
The Penguin Guide to Jazz Recordings	3/4 stars

== Track listing ==
All compositions by Max Roach except as indicated

1. "A Little Booker" - 20:28
2. "Bird Says" (Cecil Bridgewater) - 18:03

- Recorded at the Vielharmonie in Munich, West Germany on November 7, 1983

== Personnel ==
- Max Roach - drums, percussion
- Cecil Bridgewater - trumpet
- Dayne Armstrong - tenor saxophone
- Lars Holm, Ulrika Jansson - violin
- Anders Lindgren - viola
- Kerstin Elmquist - cello
- Phil Bowler - electric bass
