= Blues...? =

Studio album by String Trio of New York
- Released: 1993
- Recorded: October 5 and 6, 1993
- Genre: Jazz
- Length: 53:53
- Label: Black Saint
- Producer: Giovanni Bonandrini

String Trio of New York chronology
Live Au Petit Faucheux (1993)	Blues...? (1993)	An Outside Job (France 1993) (1993)

Blues...? is an album by American jazz group the String Trio of New York recorded in 1993 for the Italian Black Saint label.

== Reception ==
The Allmusic review by Scott Yanow awarded the album 4 stars stating "this is a successful effort, well worth seeking out by adventurous listeners".

Professional ratings
Review scores
Source	Rating
Allmusic	4/5 stars
The Penguin Guide to Jazz Recordings	3.5/4 stars

== Track listing ==
1. "Cobalt Blue" (James Emery) - 8:44
2. "Depth" (John Lindberg) - 4:55
3. "Hurry up and Wait" (Regina Carter) - 5:13
4. "Speedball" (Lee Morgan) - 4:06
5. "I'm Afraid" (Duke Ellington) - 6:07
6. "A Suite of Works by Charlie Parker" (Charlie Parker) - 6:08
7. "Bellyachin' Blues" (Lindberg) - 7:16
8. "Red Shift" (Emery) - 6:02
9. "Freddie Freeloader" (Miles Davis) - 5:22
  - Recorded at Barigozzi Studio in Milano, Italy on October 5 and 6, 1993

== Personnel ==
- Regina Carter - violin
- James Emery - guitar
- John Lindberg - bass
