= Valve No. 10 =

Studio album by Billy Bang Quartet
- Released: 1988
- Recorded: March 8 & 9, 1988
- Genre: Jazz
- Length: 47:34
- Label: Soul Note
- Producer: Giovanni Bonandrini

Billy Bang chronology
Live at Carlos 1 (1986)	Valve No. 10 (1988)	A Tribute to Stuff Smith (1992)

Valve No. 10 is an album by the American jazz violinist Billy Bang recorded in 1988 and released on the Italian Soul Note label.

== Reception ==
Professional ratings
Review scores
Source	Rating
AllMusic	2.5/5 stars
The Penguin Guide to Jazz Recordings	4/4 stars
Tom Hull – on the Web	A−

The editors of AllMusic awarded the album 2½ stars, and reviewer Scott Yanow stated: "Bang combines a strong technique with a primitive sound and it may take listeners a little while to get used to his tone".

The authors of The Penguin Guide to Jazz Recordings awarded the album a full 4 stars, calling it "a high point" and "Bang's most convincing performance since Rainbow Gladiator.

Critic Tom Hull assigned the album a rating of "A−", commenting: "Sirone sounds big on bass. Frank Lowe sounds restrained, like he's working inside the tradition rather than trying to knock it down -- one of his tastiest performances. Dennis Charles is as steady as ever."

Robert Spencer of All About Jazz described the album as "an intensely-felt, sharply-played recording," and remarked: "Lowe is masterful, adding fire that is never overstated; he manages to remain within bounds that might be considered conventionally melodic while venturing far and wide harmonically."

== Track listing ==
All compositions by Billy Bang except as indicated

1. "P.M." (Paul Mitchell, Sirone) - 5:45
2. "Valve No. 10" - 9:12
3. "September 23rd" - 5:49
4. "Improvisation for Four" - 4:08
5. "Bien-Hoa Blues" - 4:56
6. "Holiday for Flowers" (William Parker) - 5:28
7. "Lonnie's Lament" (John Coltrane) - 12:16

- Recorded at Barigozzi Studio in Milano, Italy on March 8 & 9, 1988

== Personnel ==
- Billy Bang - violin, poetry
- Frank Lowe - tenor saxophone
- Sirone – bass
- Dennis Charles – drums
