= Solo (Pisa) 1982 =

Live album by Anthony Braxton
- Released: May 17, 2007
- Recorded: July 24, 1982
- Venue: Rassegna Internazionale del Jazz, Pisa, Italy
- Genre: Jazz
- Length: 55:03
- Label: Golden Years of New Jazz; GY 028
- Producer: Leo Feigin

Anthony Braxton chronology
| Six Duets (1982) (1982) | Solo (Pisa) 1982 (2007) | Four Compositions (Quartet) 1983 (1983) |

Solo (Pisa) 1982 is a live album by composer and saxophonist Anthony Braxton featuring a solo performance recorded in Italy in 1982 and first released on the Golden Years of New Jazz label in 2007.

== Reception ==
Professional ratings
Review scores
| Source | Rating |
|---|---|
| Allmusic | 4/5 stars |
| Jazz Review | 4/5 stars |
| The Penguin Guide to Jazz Recordings | 3.5/4 stars |

The Allmusic review by François Couture stated: "Simply put, Braxton is on fire ... The atmosphere throughout the performance is unlike most avant-garde jazz recordings; then again, even by Braxton's standards, this album is also unlike most avant-garde jazz recordings. Highly recommended to fans, newcomers, saxophone students, and people who still think this kind of stuff appeals to no one." Jazz Review's Glenn Astarita said: "Overall, this program should enthrall Braxton’s legion of admirers while residing as a significant edition to his extensive discography. (Essential.... )."

== Track listing ==
All compositions by Anthony Braxton except where noted.

1. "Composition 26c" - 4:45
2. "Composition 106c" - 4:25
3. "Composition 106n" - 3:41
4. "Composition 26g +99g" - 4:20
5. "Composition 118a" - 4:22
6. "Alone Together" (Arthur Schwartz, Howard Dietz) - 5:17
7. "Composition 77e" - 4:16
8. "'Round 'Bout Midnight" (Thelonious Monk, Cootie Williams, Bernie Hanighen) - 4:45
9. "Composition 119j" - 4:12
10. "You Go to My Head" (J. Fred Coots, Haven Gillespie) - 3:49
11. "Giant Steps" (John Coltrane) - 11:11

== Personnel ==
- Anthony Braxton- alto saxophone
