= Vietnam: Reflections =

Studio album by Billy Bang
- Released: May 10, 2005
- Recorded: May 18 and 19, 2004
- Studio: Nola Recording Studios, New York City
- Genre: Jazz
- Length: 1:10:01
- Label: Justin Time; JUST 212-2
- Producer: Billy Bang

Billy Bang chronology
Vietnam: The Aftermath (2001)	Vietnam: Reflections (2005)	Configuration (2005)

Vietnam: Reflections is an album by violinist Billy Bang. It was recorded on May 18 and 19, 2004, at Nola Recording Studios in New York City, and was released on May 10, 2005, by Justin Time Records. On the album, Bang is joined by saxophonist James Spaulding, flutist Henry Threadgill, trumpeter Ted Daniel, pianist John Hicks, double bassist Curtis Lundy, drummer Michael Carvin, percussionist Ron Brown, vocalist Co Boi Nguyen, and đàn tranh player Nhan Thanh Ngo. The ensemble is conducted by Butch Morris.

The album is a follow-up to 2001's Vietnam: The Aftermath, and features many of the musicians that appeared on that recording.

== Reception ==
Professional ratings
Review scores
Source	Rating
All About Jazz	4.5/5 stars
All About Jazz	4/5 stars
All About Jazz	4/5 stars
AllMusic	4/5 stars
The Penguin Guide to Jazz	3/4 stars
PopMatters	8/10 stars
Tom Hull – on the Web	A−

In a review for AllMusic, Scott Yanow wrote: "Bang's series of recordings about his Vietnam experiences have helped him open up and purge some demons, and they have resulted in some superior music... The music is more post-bop and even hard bop than it is avant-garde, and it is both accessible and creative. Vietnam: Reflections is well worth exploring."

The authors of The Penguin Guide to Jazz Recordings noted that the album takes "his collaborators into harmonic and melodic areas they would not normally enter," and stated: "This is a lovely record, challenging, but less confrontationally so than of yore. Bang's playing still has fire and precision in equal measure."

Critic Tom Hull commented: "The music is more open, relaxed, generous than on its precedessor [sic] -- the contrast opens up a broader vista of Vietnam than the necessarily limited view seen by US soldiers."

Writing for JazzTimes, Thomas Conrad remarked: "Vietnam: Reflections is not a sequel but a logical next step in Bang's process of healing and reconciliation... [his] compositions are different in tone from those of Aftermath, with less musical depiction of fear and pain and more poignant cross-cultural empathy."

Eyal Hareuveni of All About Jazz noted that, on the album, Bang "succeeds in transforming the harrowing experiences of terror and war into a profound musical document that combines the fluidity and the swing of a hard bop jazz band with the modal angularity of Vietnamese folk songs, creating a provocative yet accessible blend." AAJ's Jim Santella wrote: "As jazz ambassadors, Bang and his chamber jazz ensemble easily spread the word while absorbing strength from the music of this foreign land. This music expands horizons, bringing people together in a cross-cultural agreement that can last for countless centuries." John Kelman commented: "despite the more straight-ahead direction of Vietnam: Reflections, there's no sense of pandering. Instead it's all about finding common ground and the potential for beauty in the simplest of contexts."

In an article for PopMatters, Robert R. Calder stated that the musicians "seem to have captured something of the Vietnam the late James Cameron... remembered from before the fire and slaughter, and in spite of the appalling French regimen. While this is a sequel to Bang's earlier CD of music of coming to some terms with the war-darkness in his life, the values enunciated commend it highly."

One Final Note's David Dupont remarked: "Reflections picks up the story where Aftermath left off, as Bang, and by extension others of his generation, come to grips with the reality of Vietnam as something more, something richer, than a battlefield."

== Track listing ==
1. "Reflections" (Billy Bang) – 11:49
2. "Ru con" (Traditional) – 3:23
3. "Lock and Load" (Billy Bang) – 12:37
4. "Ly Ngua O" (Traditional) – 2:20
5. "Doi moi" (Billy Bang) – 9:22
6. "Reconciliation" (Billy Bang) – 8:23
7. "Waltz of the Water Puppets" (Billy Bang) – 6:48
8. "Trong Com" (Traditional) – 2:29
9. "Reconciliation 2" (Billy Bang) – 12:52

== Personnel ==
- Billy Bang – violin
- James Spaulding – alto saxophone, flute
- Henry Threadgill – flute
- Ted Daniel – trumpet
- John Hicks – piano
- Curtis Lundy – double bass
- Michael Carvin – drums
- Ron Brown – percussion
- Co Boi Nguyen – vocals
- Nhan Thanh Ngo – đàn tranh
- Butch Morris – conductor
