= Bright Moments (Max Roach album) =

Studio album by Max Roach Double Quartet
- Released: 1986
- Recorded: October 1–2, 1986
- Genre: Jazz
- Length: 40:55
- Label: Soul Note
- Producer: Max Roach

Max Roach chronology
Easy Winners (1985)	Bright Moments (1986)	Max + Dizzy: Paris 1989 (1989)

Bright Moments is an album by American jazz drummer Max Roach, recorded in 1986 for the Italian Soul Note label.

== Reception ==
The AllMusic review by Scott Yanow called the album "a frequently exquisite yet adventurous album, highly recommended".

Professional ratings
Review scores
Source	Rating
AllMusic	4.5/5 stars
The Penguin Guide to Jazz Recordings	3.5/4 stars

== Track listing ==
1. "Bright Moments" (Rahsaan Roland Kirk) - 9:08
2. "Elixir Suite" (Odean Pope) - 9:45
3. "Hi-Fly" (Randy Weston) - 7:46
4. "Tribute to Duke and Mingus" (Tyrone Brown) - 5:23
5. "Double Delight" (Steve Turre) - 8:53
  - Recorded at Sound Ideas Studio, New York on October 1 & 2, 1986

== Personnel ==
- Max Roach - percussion
- Cecil Bridgewater - trumpet
- Odean Pope - tenor saxophone
- Diane Monroe, Lesa Terry - violin
- Maxine Roach - viola
- Zela Terry - cello
- Tyrone Brown - electric bass
