= Easy Winners (album) =

Studio album by Max Roach Double Quartet
- Released: 1985
- Recorded: January 4, 7 & 8, 1985
- Genre: Jazz
- Length: 38:05
- Label: Soul Note
- Producer: Max Roach

Max Roach chronology
Survivors (1984)	Easy Winners (1985)	Bright Moments (1986)

Easy Winners is an album by American jazz drummer Max Roach, recorded in 1985 for the Italian Soul Note label.

== Reception ==
Professional ratings
Review scores
Source	Rating
AllMusic	4.5/5 stars
The Penguin Guide to Jazz Recordings	3.5/4 stars

The AllMusic review by Scott Yanow stated, "The wide variety of colors and the consistently-strong improvisations make this a highly recommended set of stirring music".

== Track listing ==
1. "Bird Says" (Cecil Bridgewater) – 12:48
2. "Sis" (Odean Pope) – 6:33
3. "A Little Booker" (Max Roach) – 13:50
4. "Easy Winners" (Scott Joplin) – 4:54
- Recorded at the Platinum Factory in Brooklyn, New York on January 4, 7–8, 1985

== Personnel ==
- Max Roach – drums
- Cecil Bridgewater – trumpet
- Odean Pope – tenor saxophone
- John McLaughlin Williams, Cecelia Hobbs – violin
- Maxine Roach – viola
- Eileen Folson – cello
- Tyrone Brown – electric bass
- Ray Mantilla – percussion (track 1)
