= Six Duets (1982) =

Studio album by Anthony Braxton and John Lindberg
- Released: 1982
- Recorded: July 19, 1982
- Studio: Natali Sound Studios, Florence, Italy
- Genre: Jazz
- Length: 47:17
- Label: Cecma; CECMA 1005
- Producer: Francesco Maino

Anthony Braxton chronology
Open Aspects '82 (1982)	Six Duets (1982) (1982)	Solo (Pisa) 1982 (1983)

Six Duets (1982) is an album by American saxophonist and composer Anthony Braxton featuring bassist John Lindberg recorded in Italy in 1982 and released on the Italian Cecma label.

Professional ratings
Review scores
Source	Rating
AllMusic	3/5 stars

== Track listing ==
All compositions by Anthony Braxton are graphically titled and the following attempts to translate the title to text.

1. "R-BOXK-H [Composition No. 69B]" – 5:14
2. "BRZX-(TM)-H-28 [Composition No. 69A]" – 8:19
3. "H-46M [Composition No. 23J]" – 7:11
4. "67M/F-12 [Composition No. 6A]" – 6:36
5. "OSH------K---10Q/H/G [Composition No. 69P]" – 3:45
6. "S-37C-67B/F7 [Composition No. 52]" – 7:16
7. "Four" [take 1] (Miles Davis) – 5:55 Bonus track on CD reissue
8. "Four" [take 2] (Davis) – 3:01 Bonus track on CD reissue

== Personnel ==
- Anthony Braxton – alto saxophone, E♭ sopranino saxophone, clarinet
- John Lindberg – bass
