= Prag 1984 (Quartet Performance) =

Live album by Anthony Braxton
- Released: 1990
- Recorded: October 1984
- Venue: Prague International Jazz Festival, Prag, Czechoslovakia
- Genre: Jazz
- Length: 59:59
- Label: Sound Aspects; SAS 038
- Producer: Pedro de Freitas

Anthony Braxton chronology
| Six Compositions (Quartet) 1984 (1984) | Prag 1984 (Quartet Performance) (1990) | Seven Standards 1985, Volume 1 (1985) |

Professional ratings
Review scores
| Source | Rating |
|---|---|
| AllMusic | 3/5 stars |

Prag 1984 (Quartet Performance) is a live album by composer/saxophonist Anthony Braxton recorded at the Prague International Jazz Festival in 1984 and released on the Sound Aspects label.

== Track listing ==
All compositions by Anthony Braxton

1. Announcement – 0:52
2. "Composition 105A / Composition 110A / Composition 114 / Composition 69H" – 59:07

== Personnel ==
- Anthony Braxton – alto saxophone, soprano saxophone, C melody saxophone, clarinet, flute
- Marilyn Crispell – piano
- John Lindberg – bass
- Gerry Hemingway – drums
