= Dimension 5 (album) =

Live album by John Lindberg
- Released: 1981
- Recorded: February 27, 1981
- Genre: Jazz
- Length: 42:56
- Label: Black Saint
- Producer: John Lindberg

John Lindberg chronology
Unison (1981)	Dimension 5 (1981)	Team Work (1982)

Dimension 5 is an album by American jazz double-bassist John Lindberg recorded in 1981 for the Italian Black Saint label.

== Reception ==
Professional ratings
Review scores
Source	Rating
AllMusic	3/5 stars
The Penguin Guide to Jazz Recordings	4/4 stars
Tom Hull – on the Web	B+

The AllMusic review by Eugene Chadbourne awarded the album 3 stars stating "Lindberg put together an ensemble for this project that's as sharp as his suit... While it surely can't represent the heights these players can and do reach, in performance and conceptually, it has plenty of exciting moments".

== Track listing ==
All compositions by John Lindberg

1. "Eleven Thrice" - 15:44
2. "T'Wixt C and D Part 1" - 4:35
3. "T'Wixt C and D Part 2" - 8:04
4. "Dimension 5" - 14:33
  - Recorded at CAMI Hall in New York City on February 27, 1981

== Personnel ==
- John Lindberg - bass
- Hugh Ragin - trumpet, piccolo trumpet
- Marty Ehrlich - alto saxophone, flute
- Billy Bang - violin
- Thurman Barker - drums
