= Six Compositions (Quartet) 1984 =

Studio album by Anthony Braxton
- Released: December 28, 1984
- Recorded: September 10–11, 1984
- Studios: Vanguard Studios, NYC
- Genre: Jazz
- Length: 41:22
- Label: Black Saint
- Producer: Giovanni Bonandrini

Anthony Braxton chronology
Composition 113 (1983)	Six Compositions (Quartet) 1984 (1984)	Prag 1984 (Quartet Performance) (1984)

Six Compositions (Quartet) 1984 is an album by the American saxophonist and composer Anthony Braxton, recorded in New York in 1984 and released on the Italian Black Saint label.

== Reception ==
Professional ratings
Review scores
Source	Rating
AllMusic	4/5 stars
The Penguin Guide to Jazz	3.5/4 stars

The AllMusic review awarded the album 4 stars with Scott Yanow observing, "Anthony Braxton (who on this set plays alto, soprano, C-melody sax, clarinet, and flute) met up with his longtime pianist Marilyn Crispell for the first time on this Black Saint release. With bassist John Lindberg and drummer Gerry Hemingway forming what would be (with Mark Dresser in Lindberg's place) a regular group for nearly a decade, his quartet was off to a strong start. Braxton seems quite comfortable playing this complex music." The Penguin Guide to Jazz singled out Crispell's contributions as being particularly effective.

== Track listing ==
All compositions by Anthony Braxton.

1. "Composition No. 114 (+ 108A)" – 7:09
2. "Composition No. 110C" – 4:38
3. "Composition No. 115" – 6:37
4. "Composition No. 110A (+ 108B)" – 4:58
5. "Composition No. 110D" – 2:39
6. "Composition No. 116" – 9:46

== Personnel ==
- Anthony Braxton – alto saxophone, soprano saxophone, C melody saxophone, clarinet, flute
- Marilyn Crispell – piano
- John Lindberg – double bass
- Gerry Hemingway – percussion
