= Joy (Within)! =

Live album by William Hooker and Billy Bang
- Released: May 20, 1996
- Recorded: June 19, 1994; June 22, 1995
- Venue: Knitting Factory, New York City
- Genre: Free jazz
- Length: 1:09:28
- Label: Silkheart; SHCD 147
- Producer: Billy Bang, William Hooker

William Hooker chronology
Gift of Tongues (1995)	Joy (Within)! (1996)	Heat of the Light (Dream Sequences) (1996)

Billy Bang chronology
Hip Hop Be Bop (1993)	Joy (Within)! (1996)	Spirits Gathering (1996)

Joy (Within)! is a live album by drummer William Hooker and violinist Billy Bang. It was recorded at the Knitting Factory in New York City on June 19, 1994, and June 22, 1995, and was released on CD by Silkheart Records on May 20, 1996.

== Reception ==
Professional ratings
Review scores
Source	Rating
AllMusic	4.5/5 stars
The Penguin Guide to Jazz	3.5/4 stars
The Virgin Encyclopedia of Jazz	3/5 stars

In a review for AllMusic, Scott Yanow called the album "a fascinating release," and wrote: "the music features plenty of rumbling drums from Hooker and droning violin by Bang. Bang's ability to build up his solos from practically nothing, using repetition and passion rather than melodic development, works very well in this setting... the emphasis is on the interplay and blending of the two masterful (and slightly crazy) performers."

The authors of The Penguin Guide to Jazz Recordings stated: "Hooker is working with a master improviser, and the results muster eloquence... Bang's playing has acquired a furrowed majesty, which Hooker's rough-and-tumble rhythms throw into a special relief."

Fred Bouchard of JazzTimes described the album as "a wacky outing," and commented: "Energy unbridled is the game here, with high level dynamics and assaultive measures, but I hear more anger than joy boiling from within."

== Track listing ==
Composed by William Hooker and Billy Bang.

1. "Sweating Brain" – 17:05
2. "Hawk" – 2:29
3. "Electro / Magnetic" – 5:13
4. "Unknown Island" – 2:43
5. "Righteous" – 7:36
6. "Blood and Coffee (Surviving)" – 7:42
7. "Etheric Redemption" – 10:25
8. "Joy (Within)!" – 9:39
9. "Armed" – 6:32

== Personnel ==
- William Hooker – drums, percussion, voice
- Billy Bang – violin, flute
