= Black Saint/Soul Note =

Italian independent record labels

- Founded: 1975
- Founder: Giacomo Pellicciotti
- Distributor: North Country (in the U.S.)
- Genre: Avant-garde jazz, free jazz
- Country of origin: Italy
- Location: Tribiano
- Official website: www.blacksaint.com

Black Saint and Soul Note are two affiliated Italian independent record labels. Since their conception in the 1970s, they have released albums from a variety of influential jazz musicians, particularly in the genre of free jazz.

== History ==
Black Saint was established in 1975 by Giacomo Pellicciotti and devoted to recording avant-garde musicians who might not have an opportunity elsewhere. In 1979, a sister label, Soul Note, was established as a home for artists who, while being no less creative, might be considered slightly closer to the mainstream.

The labels specialize in avant-garde jazz stemming from the free jazz tradition. Some of its roster of artists were members of the Chicago-based music association Association for the Advancement of Creative Musicians and the St. Louis-based multidisciplinary arts collectives Black Artists Group and the Human Arts Ensemble.

The company was based in Tribiano, Italy. Many of the recordings were made in Milan, as the performers passed through the area on tour, although many leading Italian musicians, such as Giorgio Gaslini, have also recorded for the label. Giovanni Bonandrini's son Flavio ran the company until its sale in 2008, the elder Bonandrini having retired, and has supervised many recording sessions in New York City.

Starting in 1984, Black Saint/Soul Note won the Down Beat Critics Poll for best record label for six subsequent years until they were replaced by Blue Note in 1990.

Cam Jazz acquired the company in 2008.

== Discography ==
=== Black Saint ===
| Catalog number | Artist | Title |
|---|---|---|
| BSR 0001 | Billy Harper | Black Saint |
| BSR 0002 | Archie Shepp | A Sea of Faces |
| BSR 0003 | Muhal Richard Abrams featuring Malachi Favors | Sightsong |
| BSR 0004 | Don Pullen featuring Sam Rivers | Capricorn Rising |
| BSR 0005 | Frank Lowe | The Flam |
| BSR 0006/7 | The 360 Degree Music Experience | In: Sanity |
| BSR 0008 | Steve Lacy, Roswell Rudd, Kent Carter, Beaver Harris | Trickles |
| BSR 0009 | Oliver Lake | Holding Together |
| BSR 0010 | Don Pullen | Healing Force |
| BSR 0011 | Enrico Rava | Il Giro Del Giorno in 80 Mondi |
| BSR 0012 | Marcello Melis, Enrico Rava, Roswell Rudd, Don Moye, Gruppo Rubano | The New Village on the Left |
| BSR 0013 | Don Cherry, Dewey Redman, Charlie Haden, Ed Blackwell | Old and New Dreams |
| BSR 0014 | Hamiet Bluiett | Resolution |
| BSR 0015 | Julius Hemphill with Abdul Wadud and Don Moye | Raw Materials and Residuals |
| BSR 0016 | George Lewis | Shadowgraph |
| BSR 0017 | Muhal Richard Abrams | 1-OQA+19 |
| BSR 0018 | David Murray | Interboogieology |
| BSR 0019 | Don Pullen, Chico Freeman, Fred Hopkins, Bobby Battle | Warriors |
| BSR 0020 | Lester Bowie | The 5th Power |
| BSR 0021 | Charles "Bobo" Shaw Human Arts Ensemble featuring Joseph Bowie | Junk Trap |
| BSR 0022 | Leroy Jenkins | The Legend of Ai Glatson |
| BSR 0023 | Marcello Melis | Free to Dance |
| BSR 0024 | Max Roach featuring Anthony Braxton | Birth and Rebirth |
| BSR 0025 | Andrew Cyrille | Metamusicians' Stomp |
| BSR 0026 | George Lewis & Douglas Ewart | Jila - Save! Mon. - The Imaginary Suite |
| BSR 0027 | World Saxophone Quartet | Steppin' with the World Saxophone Quartet |
| BSR 0028 | Don Pullen featuring Don Moye | Milano Strut |
| BSR 0029 | George Lewis | Homage to Charles Parker |
| BSR 0030 | Andrew Cyrille, Jeanne Lee & Jimmy Lyons | Nuba |
| BSR 0031 | String Trio of New York | First String |
| BSR 0032 | Muhal Richard Abrams | Spihumonesty |
| BSR 0033 | Leroy Jenkins & Muhal Richard Abrams | Lifelong Ambitions |
| BSR 0034 | Air | Live Air |
| BSR 0035 | Steve Lacy Quintet | Troubles |
| BSR 0036 | Chico Freeman | No Time Left |
| BSR 0037 | Kalaparusha Maurice McIntyre Quartet | Peace and Blessings |
| BSR 0038 | Joseph Jarman, Don Pullen & Don Moye | The Magic Triangle |
| BSR 0039 | David Murray Trio | Sweet Lovely |
| BSR 0040 | Julius Hemphill | Flat-Out Jump Suite |
| BSR 0041 | Muhal Richard Abrams | Mama and Daddy |
| BSR 0042 | Joseph Jarman – Don Moye featuring Johnny Dyani | Black Paladins |
| BSR 0043 | Steve Colson Unity Troupe | No Reservation |
| BSR 0044 | Oliver Lake Quintet | Prophet |
| BSR 0045 | David Murray Octet | Ming |
| BSR 0046 | World Saxophone Quartet | W.S.Q. |
| BSR 0047 | The John Carter Quintet | Night Fire |
| BSR 0048 | String Trio of New York | Area Code 212 |
| BSR 0049 | Air | Air Mail |
| BSR 0050 | Roscoe Mitchell and the Sound Ensemble | 3 x 4 Eye |
| BSR 0051 | Muhal Richard Abrams featuring Amina Claudine Myers | Duet |
| BSR 0052 | Joseph Jarman – Don Moye | Earth Passage - Density |
| BSR 0053 | Leo Smith & New Dalta Ahkri | Go in Numbers |
| BSR 0054 | Oliver Lake Quartet | Clevont Fitzhubert |
| BSR 0055 | David Murray Octet | Home |
| BSR 0056 | World Saxophone Quartet | Revue |
| BSR 0057 | John Carter Octet | Dauwhe |
| BSR 0058 | String Trio of New York | Common Goal |
| BSR 0059 | Wayne Horvitz, Butch Morris & William Parker | Some Order, Long Understood |
| BSR 0060 | Leroy Jenkins | Mixed Quintet |
| BSR 0061 | Muhal Richard Abrams | Blues Forever |
| BSR 0062 | John Lindberg Quintet | Dimension 5 |
| BSR 0063 | World Bass Violin Ensemble | BASSically Yours |
| BSR 0064 | Sam Rivers Winds of Manhattan | Colours |
| BSR 0065 | David Murray Octet | Murray's Steps |
| BSR 0066 | Anthony Braxton | Four Compositions (Quartet) 1983 |
| BSR 0067 | Jimmy Lyons Quintet | Wee Sneezawee |
| BSR 0068 | String Trio of New York | Rebirth of a Feeling |
| BSR 0069 | Marilyn Crispell Quartet | Live in Berlin |
| BSR 0070 | Roscoe Mitchell | Roscoe Mitchell and the Sound and Space Ensembles |
| BSR 0071 | Muhal Richard Abrams Orchestra | Rejoicing with the Light |
| BSR 0072 | John Lindberg Trio | Give and Take |
| BSR 0073 | Marcello Melis | Angedras' |
| BSR 0074 | Oliver Lake Quintet | Expandable Language |
| BSR 0075 | David Murray Quartet | Morning Song |
| BSR 0076 | Rova Saxophone Quartet | Favorite Street |
| BSR 0077 | World Saxophone Quartet | Live in Zurich |
| BSR 0078 | Amina Claudine Myers Trio | The Circle of Time |
| BSR 0079 | Keshavan Maslak with Charles Moffett | Blaster Master |
| BSR 0080 | Don Pullen | Evidence of Things Unseen |
| BSR 0081 | Muhal Richard Abrams Octet | View from Within |
| BSR 0082 | John Lindberg | Trilogy of Works for Eleven Instrumentalists |
| BSR 0083 | Leroy Jenkins' Sting | Urban Blues |
| BSR 0084 | New Air | Live at Montreal International Jazz Festival |
| BSR 0085 | David Murray Big Band | Live at Sweet Basil Volume 1 |
| BSR 0086 | Anthony Braxton | Six Compositions (Quartet) 1984 |
| BSR 0087 | Jimmy Lyons Quintet | Give It Up |
| BSR 0088 | Don Pullen Quintet | The Sixth Sense |
| BSR 0089 | David Murray | Children |
| BSR 0090 | Roscoe Mitchell Quartet | The Flow of Things |
| BSR 0091 | Muhal Richard Abrams | Colors in Thirty-Third |
| BSR 0092 | Karl Berger, Dave Holland & Ed Blackwell | Transit |
| BSR 0093 | Dewey Redman & Ed Blackwell | Red and Black in Willisau |
| BSR 0094 | John Tchicai Group | Timo's Message |
| BSR 0095 | David Murray Big Band | Live at Sweet Basil Volume 2 |
| BSR 0096 | World Saxophone Quartet | Live at Brooklyn Academy of Music |
| BSR 0097 | Hamiet Bluiett | The Clarinet Family |
| BSR 0098 | String Trio of New York | Natural Balance |
| BSR 0099 | New Air featuring Cassandra Wilson | Air Show No. 1 |
| BSR 0100 | David Murray Octet | New Life |
| 120101-1/2/4 | Sun Ra Arkestra | Reflections in Blue |
| 12 0102-2 | Paul Murphy, Glenn Spearman, & William Parker - Trio Hurricane | Suite of Winds |
| 12 0103-1/2/4 | Muhal Richard Abrams Orchestra | The Hearinga Suite |
| 12 0104-2 | Oliver Lake | Edge-ing |
| 12 0105-2 | David Murray Quartet | I Want to Talk About You |
| BSR 0106 | Anthony Braxton | Five Compositions (Quartet) 1986 |
| BSR 0107 | Clarinet Summit | Southern Bells |
| BSR 0108 | John Lindberg, Albert Mangelsdorff & Eric Watson | Dodging Bullets |
| BSR 0109 | The Sonny Clark Memorial Quartet | Voodoo |
| 12 0110-1/2/4 | David Murray Trio | The Hill |
| 12 0111-1/2/4 | Sun Ra Arkestra | Hours After |
| 12 0112-1/2 | Karl Berger and Friends | Around |
| 12 0113-1/2/4 | Old and New Dreams | A Tribute to Blackwell |
| 12 0114-2 | The American Jazz Quintet | From Bad to Badder |
| 12 0115-2 | Julius Hemphill Sextet | Fat Man and the Hard Blues |
| 12 0116-1/2/3 | Anthony Braxton | Six Monk's Compositions (1987) |
| 12 0117-2 | Muhal Richard Abrams Orchestra | Blu Blu Blu |
| 12 0118-1/2/4 | David Murray and Randy Weston | The Healers |
| 12 0119-1/2/4 | The Leaders | Out Here Like This |
| 12 0120-1/2 | Roscoe Mitchell and the Sound Ensemble | Live at the Knitting Factory |
| 12 0121-1/2 | Sun Ra Arkestra | Mayan Temples |
| 12 0122-2 | Leroy Jenkins | Leroy Jenkins Live! featuring Computer Minds |
| 12 0123-1/2/4 | Dewey Redman Quartet | Living on the Edge |
| 12 0124-1/2 | Anthony Braxton | 4 (Ensemble) Compositions 1992 |
| 12 0125-1/2/4 | Jimmy Lyons & Andrew Cyrille | Something in Return |
| 12 0126-1/2/4 | ROVA | Beat Kennel |
| 12 0127-2 | World Saxophone Quartet | Moving Right Along |
| 12 0128-1/2/4 | Chico Freeman featuring Von Freeman | You'll Know When You Get There |
| 12 0129-1/2/4 | The Leaders | Unforeseen Blessings |
| 12 0130-1/2 | Jimmy Lyons & Andrew Cyrille | Burnt Offering |
| 12 0131-2 | String Trio of New York | Octagon |
| 12 0132-2 | Muhal Richard Abrams | Family Talk |
| 12 0133-1/2 | Roscoe Mitchell & Muhal Richard Abrams | Duets and Solos |
| 12 0134-1/2 | Henry Threadgill Very Very Circus | Spirit of Nuff...Nuff |
| 12 0135-1/2 | ROVA | From the Bureau of Both |
| 12 0136-1/2 | Chico Freeman & Mal Waldron | Up and Down |
| 12 0137-2 | Anthony Braxton with The Northwest Creative Orchestra | Eugene (1989) |
| 12 0138-2 | Charles Gayle | Consecration |
| 12 0139-1/2 | David Murray Octet | Hope Scope |
| 12 0140-2 | Julius Hemphill Sextett | Five Chord Stud |
| 12 0141-2 | Muhal Richard Abrams | Think All, Focus One |
| 12 0142-2 | Joe Rosenberg | The Long & Short of It |
| 12 0143-2 | Diedre Murray & Fred Hopkins | Stringology |
| 12 0144-2 | Oliver Lake | Dedicated to Dolphy |
| 12 0145-1/2 | David Murray Quartet | A Sanctuary Within |
| 12 0146-2 | Julius Hemphill & Warren Smith | Chile New York: Sound Environment |
| 12 0147-1/2 | Glenn Spearman Double Trio | Mystery Project |
| 12 0148-2 | String Trio of New York | Blues...? |
| 12 0149-2 | Keshavan Maslak with Paul Bley | Not to Be a Star |
| 12 0150-2 | Roscoe Mitchell and the Note Factory | This Dance Is for Steve McCall |
| 12 0151-2 | Tiziano Tononi & The Ornettians | Peace Warriors |
| 12 0152-2 | Phillip Johnston | Phillip Johnston's Big Trouble |
| 12 0153-2 | Ed Blackwell Trio | Walls–Bridges |
| 12 0154-2 | Henry Threadgill | Song Out of My Trees |
| 12 0155-2 | David Murray Quartet | Body and Soul |
| 12 0156-2 | Lisle Ellis Group | What We Live Fo(u)r |
| 12 0157-2 | Glenn Spearman Double Trio | Smokehouse |
| 12 0158-2 | Charles Gayle Quartet | Daily Bread |
| 12 0159-2 | William Parker | In Order to Survive |
| 12 0160-2 | Hugh Ragin Collective | Back to Saturn |
| 12 0161-2 | Muhal Richard Abrams | Song for All |
| 12 0162-2 | John Lindberg Quartet | Afterstorm |
| 12 0163-2 | The Eastern Seaboard | Nonfiction |
| 12 0164-2 | Flute Force Four | Flutistry |
| 12 0165-2 | David Murray with Dave Burrell | Windward Passages |
| 12 0166-2 | Anthony Braxton | Composition No. 173 |
| 12 0167-2 | Figure 8 | Pipe Dreams |
| 12 0168-2 | String Trio of New York | Faze Phour: A Twenty Year Retrospective |
| 12 0169-2 | What We Live | Never Was |
| 12 0172-2 | John Lindberg | Resurrection of a Dormant Soul |
| 12 0173-2 | Heinz Geisser / Guerino Mazzolo Quartet | Chronotomy |
| 12 0176-2 | Rova | The Works |
| 12 0177-2 | Larry Ochs | The Secret Magritte |
| 12 0178-2 | String Trio of New York | The River of Orion: 30 Years Running |
| 12 0179-2 | William Parker & The Little Huey Creative Orchestra | Mass for the Healing of the World |
| 12 0180-2 | ROVA | John Coltrane's Ascension |
| 12 0181-2 | Tiziano Tononi & The Ornettians | Peace Warriors (Forgotten Children) |
| 12 0182-2 | Philip Johnston's Big Trouble | Flood at the Ant Farm |
| 12 0184-2 | Carla Marciano 4tet | A Strange Day |
| 12 0186-2 | ROVA | The Works (Volume 2) |
| 12 0189-2 | What We Live | Trumpets |
| 12 0192-2 | John Lindberg Ensemble | Bounce |
| 12 0194-2 | Carla Marciano 4tet | Change of Mood |
| 12 0196-2 | ROVA | The Works (Volume 3) |
| 12 0197-2 | Glenn Spearman Double Trio | The Fields |
| 12 0198-2 | John Lindberg Ensemble | The Catbird Sings |
| 12 0199-2 | Marilyn Crispell & Stefano Maltese | Red |
| 12 0202-2 | Joe Rosenberg | Danse de la fureur |
| 12 0206-2 | ROVA | Totally Spinning |
| 12 0207-2 | Glenn Spearman | Free Worlds |
| 12 0209-2 | Marilyn Crispell & Stefano Maltese | Blue |
| 12 0217-2 | Larry Ochs | The Neon Truth |
| 12 0242-2 | Joe Rosenberg | Quicksand |

=== Soul Note ===
| Catalog number | Artist | Title |
|---|---|---|
| SN 1001 | Billy Harper | Billy Harper Quintet in Europe |
| SN 1002 | Beaver Harris 360 Degree Music Experience | Beautiful Africa |
| SN 1003 | Max Roach Quartet | Pictures in a Frame |
| SN 1004 | George Adams-Don Pullen Quartet | Don't Lose Control |
| SN 1005 | Dannie Richmond Quartet | Ode to Mingus |
| SN 1006 | Martha Bass, Fontella Bass, David Peaston | From the Root to the Source |
| SN 1007 | George Adams – Dannie Richmond | Hand to Hand |
| SN 1008 | Bill Dixon | Bill Dixon in Italy Volume One |
| SN 1009 | George Russell Sextet | Electronic Sonata for Souls Loved by Nature - 1980 |
| SN 1010 | Andrew Hill | Faces of Hope |
| SN 1011 | Bill Dixon | Bill Dixon in Italy Volume Two |
| SN 1012 | Andrew Cyrille | Special People |
| SN 1013 | Andrew Hill Trio | Strange Serenade |
| SN 1014 | George Russell | Othello Ballet Suite/Electronic Organ Sonata No. 1 |
| SN 1015 | Barry Altschul Quartet | For Stu |
| SN 1016 | Billy Bang Quintet | Rainbow Gladiator |
| SN 1017 | Tom Varner Quartet | Tom Varner Quartet |
| SN 1018 | Hamiet Bluiett | Dangerously Suite |
| SN 1019 | George Russell | Vertical Form VI |
| SN 1020 | Giorgio Gaslini | Gaslini Plays Monk |
| SN 1021 | Enrico Pieranunzi Quartet & Quintet featuring Art Farmer | Isis |
| SN 1022 | Ran Blake – Jaki Byard | Improvisations |
| SN 1023 | Baikida Carroll | Shadows and Reflections |
| SN 1024 | George Russell | Listen to the Silence |
| SN 1025 | Jaki Byard | To Them - To Us |
| SN 1026 | Art Farmer Quintet | Manhattan |
| SN 1027 | Ran Blake | Duke Dreams |
| SN 1028 | Walt Dickerson, Sirone, Andrew Cyrille | Life Rays |
| SN 1029 | George Russell Sextet | Trip to Prillarguri |
| SN 1030 | Borah Bergman | A New Frontier |
| SN 1031 | Kenny Drew Trio | Your Soft Eyes |
| SN 1032 | Frank Lowe Quintet | Exotic Heartbreak |
| SN 1033 | Kim Parker and the Kenny Drew Trio | Havin' Myself a Time |
| SN 1034 | George Russell | Electronic Sonata for Souls Loved by Nature - 1968 |
| SN 1035 | Steve Lacy | The Flame |
| SN 1036 | Billy Bang Quintet | Invitation |
| SN 1037/1038 | Bill Dixon | November 1981 |
| SN 1039 | George Russell | New York Big Band |
| SN 1040 | Kenny Drew | It Might as Well Be Spring |
| SN 1041 | Jemeel Moondoc Sextet | Konstanze's Delight |
| SN 1042 | Mingus Dynasty | Reincarnation |
| SN 1043 | Peter Kuhn Quartet | The Kill |
| SN 1044/1045 | George Russell | The Essence of George Russell |
| SN 1046 | Art Farmer Quintet | Mirage |
| SN 1047 | Lilian Terry meets Tommy Flanagan | A Dream Comes True |
| SN 1048 | Saheb Sarbib Quartet | Seasons |
| SN 1049 | George Russell's New York Band | Live in an American Time Spiral |
| SN 1050 | Mitchel Forman | Childhood Dreams |
| SN 1051 | Jemeel Moondoc Trio | Judy's Bounce |
| SN 1052 | Hugh Lawson | Colour |
| SN 1053 | Max Roach Quartet | In the Light |
| SN 1054 | Roswell Rudd, Steve Lacy, Misha Mengelberg, Kent Carter & Han Bennink | Regeneration |
| SN 1055 | Craig Harris | Black Bone |
| SN 1056 | Tiziana Ghiglioni | Sounds of Love |
| SN 1057 | George Adams – Dannie Richmond | Gentlemen's Agreement |
| SN 1058 | Jimmy Giuffre 4 | Dragonfly |
| SN 1059 | M'Boom | Collage |
| SN 1060 | Martial Solal | Bluesine |
| SN 1061 | Tim Berne Sextet | The Ancestors |
| SN 1062 | Andrew Cyrille | The Navigator |
| SN 1063 | Kim Parker with the Tommy Flanagan Trio | Good Girl |
| SN 1064 | Enrico Rava Quintet | Andanada |
| SN 1065 | Barry Altschul Quartet | Irina |
| SN 1066 | The Jazztet | Moment to Moment |
| SN 1067 | Tom Varner Quartet | Motion/Stillness |
| SN 1068 | Bobby Bradford and the Mo'tet | Lost in L.A. |
| SN 1069 | Lee Konitz Nonet | Live at Laren |
| SN 1070 | Mitchel Forman | Only a Memory |
| SN 1071 | Claudio Fasoli | Lido |
| SN 1072 | Michele Rosewoman | The Source |
| SN 1073 | Max Roach Double Quartet | Live at Vielharmonie |
| SN 1074 | Paul Motian | The Story of Maryam |
| SN 1075 | Jaki Byard and the Apollo Stompers | Phantasies |
| SN 1076 | Art Farmer Quintet | You Make Me Smile |
| SN 1077 | Ran Blake | Suffield Gothic |
| SN 1078 | Kenny Clarke, Andrew Cyrille, Milford Graves, Famoudou Don Moye | Pieces of Time |
| SN 1079 | Charli Persip and Superband (II) | In Case You Missed It |
| SN 1080 | Borah Bergman | Upside Down Visions |
| SN 1081 | Kenny Drew Quartet | And Far Away |
| SN 1082 | Frank Lowe | Decision in Paradise |
| SN 1083 | Tony Scott | African Bird Come Back! Mother Africa |
| SN 1084 | Clifford Jordan Quartet | Repetition |
| SN 1085 | Paul Bley | Sonor |
| SN 1086 | Billy Bang Sextet | The Fire from Within |
| SN 1087 | Ray Anderson | Right Down Your Alley |
| SN 1088 | Hamiet Bluiett | Ebu |
| SN 1089 | Cecil Taylor Segments II (Orchestra of Two Continents) | Winged Serpent (Sliding Quadrants) |
| SN 1090 | Paul Bley | Tango Palace |
| SN 1091 | Tim Berne | Mutant Variations |
| SN 1092 | Jimmy Knepper Sextet | I Dream Too Much |
| SN 1093 | Max Roach | Survivors |
| SN 1094 | George Adams-Don Pullen Quartet | Live at the Village Vanguard |
| SN 1095 | John Stubblefield | Confessin' |
| SN 1096 | Frank Gordon | Clarion Echoes |
| SN 1097 | Ellen Christi with Menage | Live at Irving Plaza |
| SN 1098 | Saheb Sarbib Quintet | It Couldn't Happen Without You |
| SN 1099 | Stephen Horenstein | Collages Jerusalem '85 |
| SN 1100/1 | Cecil Taylor and Max Roach | Historic Concerts |
| SN 1102 | Archie Shepp | Down Home New York |
| SN 1103 | Max Roach Quartet | Scott Free |
| SN 1104 | Misha Mengelberg, Steve Lacy, George Lewis, Harjen Gorter, Han Bennink | Change of Season (Music of Herbie Nichols) |
| SN 1105 | Art Blakey and the Jazz Messengers | Not Yet |
| SN 1106 | From the Other Side | From the Other Side |
| SN 1107 | Paul Nash | Second Impression |
| SN 1108 | Jimmy Giuffre 4 | Quasar |
| SN 1109 | Max Roach Double Quartet | Easy Winners |
| SN 1110 | Andrew Hill | Verona Rag |
| SN 1111 | Bill Dixon | Thoughts |
| SN 1112 | Archie Shepp | Little Red Moon |
| SN 1113 | Andrew Hill | Shades |
| SN 1114 | Enrico Rava | String Band |
| SN 1115 | Barry Altschul Quartet/Quintet | That's Nice |
| SN 1116 | The Satchmo Legacy Band | Salute to Pops – Vol. 1 |
| SN 1117 | Fred Houn and the Afro-Asian Music Ensemble | Tomorrow is Now! |
| SN 1118 | Mal Waldron Quintet | The Git Go - Live at the Village Vanguard |
| SN 1119 | Lee Konitz Quartet | Ideal Scene |
| SN 1120 | Giorgio Gaslini | Schumann Reflections |
| SN 1121 | Enrico Pieranunzi, Marc Johnson, Joey Baron | Deep Down |
| SN 1122 | Archie Shepp | California Meeting: Live on Broadway |
| SN 1123 | Baikida Carroll | Door of the Cage |
| SN 1124 | Paul Motian Quintet | Jack of Clubs |
| SN 1125 | Jaki Byard Trio | Foolin' Myself |
| SN 1126 | Art Farmer - Fritz Pauer | Azure |
| SN 1127 | Ran Blake Quartet | Short Life of Barbara Monk |
| SN 1128 | World Music - Live at the Donaueschingen Festival | To Hear the World in a Grain of Sand |
| SN 1129 | The Odean Pope Saxophone Choir | The Saxophone Shop |
| SN 1130 | Mal Waldron | Update |
| SN 1131 | Guido Manusardi Trio | Down Town |
| SN 1132 | Joe Lovano Quartet | Tones, Shapes & Colors |
| SN 1133 | Kim Parker | Sometimes I'm Blue |
| SN 1134 | Mike Melillo - Chet Baker | Symphonically |
| SN 1135 | Steve Lacy Sextet | The Condor |
| SN 1136 | Billy Bang Sextet | Live at Carlos 1 |
| SN 1137 | Jeff Hittman - Yoshitaka Uematsu Quintet | Mosaic |
| SN 1138 | Bill Dixon | Son of Sisyphus |
| SN 1139 | Cecil Tayor | Olu Iwa |
| SN 1140 | Paul Bley Group | Hot |
| SN 1141 | Jemeel Moondoc Quintet | Nostalgia in Times Square |
| SN 1142 | Mingus Dynasty | Mingus' Sound of Love |
| SN 1143 | Art Davis Quartet | Life |
| SN 1144 | George Adams - Don Pullen Quartet | Live at the Village Vanguard Vol. 2 |
| SN 1145 | Horace Parlan Quartet | Little Esther |
| SN 1146 | Kenny Wheeler Quintet | Flutter By, Butterfly |
| SN 1147 | Lilian Terry with Dizzy Gillespie | Oo-shoo-be-doo-be...Ooo, Oo ...Oo, Oo |
| SN 1148 | Mal Waldron Quintet | The Seagulls of Kristiansund |
| SN 1149 | Dino Betti van der Noot | Here Comes Springtime |
| SN 1150 | Cecil Taylor | For Olim |
| SN 1151 | Michael Cochrane Quintet | Elements |
| SN 1152 | Monty Alexander | Threesome |
| SN 1153 | Max Roach | It's Christmas Again |
| SN 1154 | Misha Mengelberg, Steve Lacy, George Lewis, Ernst Reyseger, Han Bennink | Dutch Masters |
| SN 1155 | Art Blakey and the Jazz Messengers | I Get a Kick Out of Bu |
| SN 1156 | Tiziana Ghiglioni | Somebody Special |
| SN 1157 | Nana Vasconcelos / Antonello Salis | Lester |
| SN 1158 | Jimmy Giuffre 4 | Liquid Dancers |
| SN 1159 | Max Roach Double Quartet | Bright Moments |
| SN 1160 | Steve Lacy | Only Monk |
| SN 1161 | Buell Neidlinger's String Jazz | Locomotive |
| SN 1162 | Charlie Haden / Paul Motian featuring Geri Allen | Etudes |
| SN 1163 | Shannon Gibbons | Shannon Gibbons |
| SN 1164 | Enrico Rava | Secrets |
| SN 1165 | Buddy Collette Quintet featuring James Newton | Flute Talk |
| SN 1166 | The Satchmo Legacy Band | Salute to Pops - Vol. 2 |
| SN 1167 | Fred Houn & The Afro-Asian Music Ensemble | We Refuse to be Used and Abused |
| SN 1168 | Bobby Bradford with the Frak Sullivan Trio | One Night Stand |
| SN 1169 | Lee Konitz Quartet | The New York Album |
| SN 1170 | Mal Waldron – Steve Lacy | Sempre Amore |
| SN 1171 | Claudio Fasoli, Kenny Wheeler, J.-F. Jenny Clark, Daniel Humair | Welcome |
| SN 1172 | Charlie Haden with Chet Baker, Enrico Pieranunzi, Billy Higgins | Silence |
| SN 1173 | Bob Moses | Devotion |
| SN 1174 | Paul Motian Quintet | Misterioso |
| SN 1175 | Jaki Byard and the Apollo Stompers | Phantasies II |
| SN 1176 | Tom Varner | Jazz French Horn |
| SN 1177 | Ran Blake | Epistrophy |
| SN 1178 | Mal Waldron David Friesen | Dedication |
| SN 1179 | Charli Persip and Superband | No Dummies Allowed |
| SN 1180 | Tete Montoliu | The Music I Like to Play Vol. 1 |
| SN 1181 | Guido Manusardi – Red Mitchell | Together Again |
| SN 1182 | Joe Lovano Quintet | Village Rhythm |
| SN 1183 | Teddy Charles Quartet | Live at the Verona Jazz Festival, 1988 |
| SN 1184 | Arnett Cobb, Jimmy Heath, Joe Henderson | Tenor Tribute |
| SN 1185 | Steve Lacy Trio | The Window |
| SN 1186 | Billy Bang Quartet | Valve No. 10 |
| SN 1187 | Bass Drum Bone | Wooferlo |
| SN 1188 | Hamiet Bluiett | Nali Kola |
| SN 1189 | Unused | |
| SN 1190 | Paul Bley, Paul Motian | Notes |
| SN 1191 | The Original Chico Hamilton Quintet | Reunion |
| SN 1192 | Big Band Charlie Mingus | Live at the Theatre Boulogne-Billancourt/Paris, Vol. 1 |
| SN 1193 | Big Band Charlie Mingus | Live at the Theatre Boulogne-Billancourt/Paris, Vol. 2 |
| SN 1194 | Arnett Cobb, Jimmy Heath, Joe Henderson | Tenor Tribute Vol. 2 |
| SN 1195 | David Liebman | The Tree |
| SN 1196 | Eric Felten – Jimmy Knepper | T-Bop |
| SN 1197 | Gladys Carbó | Street Cries |
| SN 1198 | Mal Waldron Trio | Our Colline's a Treasure |
| SN 1199 | Dino Betti van der Noot | They Cannot Know |
| SN 1200 | Tete Montoliu | The Music I Like to Play Vol. 2 |
| SN 1201 | Jeff Palmer, John Abercrombie, Dave Liebman, Adam Nussbaum | Abracadabra |
| SN 1202 | Dameronia | Live at the Theatre Boulogne-Billancourt Paris |
| SN 1203 | Jon Jang & Pan-Asian Arkestra | Self Defense! |
| SN 1204 | Joe Morris Trio | Symbolic Gesture |
| SN 1205 | The Fringe | It's Time for The Fringe |
| SN 1206 | Niels Lan Doky | Paris By Night |
| SN 1207 | Manhattan New Music Project | Mood Swing |
| SN 1208 | Bill Dixon | Vade Mecum |
| SN 1209 | Gil Evans Orchestra | A Tribute to Gil |
| SN 1210 | Steve Lacy | More Monk |
| SN 1211 | Bill Dixon | Vade Mecum II |
| SN 1212 | Borah Bergman with Andrew Cyrille | The Human Factor |
| SN 1213 | Paul Bley – Gary Peacock | Mindset |
| SN 1214 | Enrico Rava | Electric Five |
| SN 1215 | Stephane Furic | Kishinev |
| SN 1216 | Billy Bang with Sun Ra, John Ore, Andrew Cyrille | A Tribute to Stuff Smith |
| SN 1217 | Tom Varner | The Mystery of Compassion |
| SN 1218 | Mal Waldron Quintet | Crowd Scene |
| SN 1219 | Lee Konitz Quartet | Zounds |
| SN 1220 | Giorgio Gaslini Quintet | Multipli |
| SN 1221 | Enrico Pieranunzi Trio | No Man's Land |
| SN 1222 | Charlie Haden, Billy Higgins, Enrico Pieranunzi | First Song |
| SN 1223 | Jon Jang & The Pan-Asian Arkestra | Tiananmen! |
| SN 1224 | Paul Motian Trio | One Time Out |
| SN 1225 | Stephane Furic | The Twitter-Machine |
| SN 1226 | Dave Douglas | Parallel Worlds |
| SN 1227 | Ran Blake | Unmarked Van: A Tribute to Sarah Vaughan |
| SN 1228 | Glenn Horiuchi | Oxnard Beet |
| SN 1229 | The Odean Pope Saxophone Choir | The Ponderer |
| SN 1230 | Tete Montoliu | The Music I Like to Play Vol. 3 |
| SN 1231 | Gianluigi Trovesi Octet | From G to G |
| SN 1232 | Ellery Eskelin Trio | Figure of Speech |
| SN 1233 | Nancy Harrow | Secrets |
| SN 1234 | Steve Lacy Quartet | Revenue |
| SN 1235 | Paul Bley Group | Live at Sweet Basil |
| SN 1236 | Kenny Wheeler | All the More |
| SN 1237 | Eric Person | Arrival |
| SN 1238 | Hamiet Bluiett | Sankofa / Rear Garde |
| SN 1239 | Unused | |
| SN 1240 | Paul Bley, Charlie Haden, Paul Motian | Memoirs |
| SN 1241 | Chico Hamilton and Euphoria | Arroyo |
| SN 1242 | Enrico Pieranunzi / Paul Motian | Flux and Change |
| SN 1243 | Michael Marcus | Here At! |
| SN 1244 | Paolino Dalla Porta | Tales |
| SN 1245 | David Liebman, Cecil McBee, Billy Hart | The Seasons |
| SN 1246 | Chico Hamilton | Trio! |
| SN 1247 | Quintetto Vocale Italiano | Freedom Jazz Dance |
| SN 1248 | Mal Waldron Quintet | Where Are You? |
| SN 1249 | Lee Konitz, Peggy Stern | Lunasea |
| SN 1250 | Tete Montoliu | The Music I Like to Play Vol. 4 |
| SN 1251 | Michael Cochrane Trio | Songs of Change |
| SN 1252 | Borah Bergman with Evan Parker | The Fire Tale |
| SN 1253 | Jon Jang Sextet | Two Flowers on a Stem |
| SN 1254 | Maurizio Giammarco Heart Quartet | Inside |
| SN 1255 | Craig Harris | F-Stops |
| SN 1256 | Tiziana Ghiglioni, Enrico Rava, Mal Waldron | I'll be Around |
| SN 1257 | Furio Di Castri, Paolo Fresu, Jon Blake, Pierre Favre | Mythscapes |
| SN 1258 | Jimmy Giuffre / Paul Bley / Steve Swallow | Conversations with a Goose |
| SN 1259 | James Jabbo Ware & The Me We & Them Orchestra | Heritage Is |
| SN 1260 | Steve Lacy Octet | Vespers |
| SN 1261 | Michael Formanek, Tim Berne, Jeff Hirshfield | Loose Cannon |
| SN 1262 | Andrew Cyrille | X Man |
| SN 1263 | Nancy Harrow | Lost Lady |
| SN 1264 | Unused | |
| SN 1265 | Chico Hamilton and Euphoria | My Panamanian Friend |
| SN 1266 | Rob Brown Trio | High Wire |
| SN 1267 | Fred Ho and the Afro-Asian Music Ensemble | The Underground Railroad to My Heart |
| SN 1268 | Glenn Horiuchi | Calling Is It and Now |
| SN 1269 | Adam Rudolph's Moving Pictures | Skyway |
| SN 1270 | Giorgio Gaslini | Ayler's Wings |
| SN 1271 | Gebhard Ullmann | Basement Research |
| SN 1272 | Enrico Pieranunzi Trio | Seaward |
| SN 1273 | Mark Dresser | Force Green |
| SN 1274 | Klaus Suonsaari | Inside Out |
| SN 1275 | Stephane Furic | Crossing Brooklyn Ferry |
| SN 1276 | Dave Douglas | Five |
| SN 1277 | Don Friedman Trio | The Days of Wine and Roses |
| SN 1278 | David Friesen, Eddie Moore, Jim Pepper, Julian Priester, Mal Waldron | Remembering the Moment |
| SN 1279 | Odean Pope Saxophone Choir | Epitome |
| SN 1280 | Borah Bergman with Hamid Drake | Reflections on Ornette Coleman and the Stone House |
| SN 1281 | Guido Manusardi / Dave Santoro / Jerry Bergonzi / Victor Lewis | Within |
| SN 1282 | Ellery Eskelin | The Sun Died |
| SN 1283 | Marc Copland Trio | Paradiso |
| SN 1284 | Tony Oxley Celebration Orchestra feat. Bill Dixon | The Enchanted Messenger |
| SN 1285 | Paul Bley, Furio Di Castri, Tony Oxley | Chaos |
| SN 1286 | Tom Varner | Martian Heartache |
| SN 1287 | Eric Person | Prophecy |
| SN 1288 | Hamiet Bluiett | Live at the Village Vanguard: Ballads and Blues |
| SN 1289 | Unused | |
| SN 1290 | Giorgio Gaslini Globo Quartet | Lampi (Lightings) |
| SN 1291 | Chico Hamilton | Dancing to a Different Drummer |
| SN 1292 | Andrey Cyrille Trio | Good to Go, with a Tribute to Bu |
| SN 1293 | Francesca Sortino | With My Heart in a Song |
| SN 1294 | Zone | First Definition |
| SN 1295 | Dave Liebman | Songs for My Daughter |
| SN 1296 | Eric Felten | Gratitude |
| SN 1297 | Tiziana Ghiglioni | Tiziana Ghiglioni sings Gaslini |
| SN 1298 | Steve Lacy / Mal Waldron | Communiqué |
| SN 1299 | European Music Orchestra | Guest |
| SN 1300 | Giorgio Gaslini | Mister O Jazz Opera |
| SN 1301 | Jeff Palmer | Island Universe |
| SN 1302 | Phil Haynes | Live Insurgency |
| SN 1303 | Jon Jang | Island |
| SN 1304 | Joe Morris Quartet | You Be Me |
| SN 1305 | The Fringe | Live in Israel |
| SN 1306 | Anita Gravine | Lights! Camera! Passion! |
| SN 1307 | Eric Person | More Tales to Tell |
| SN 1308 | Bill Dixon with Tony Oxley | Papyrus Volume I |
| SN 1309 | Sax Appeal Saxophone Quartet plus Claudio Fasoli | Giotto |
| SN 1310 | Loren Stillman Quartet | Cosmos |
| SN 1311 | Gianluigi Trovesi Octet | Les Hommes Armés |
| SN 1312 | Unused | |
| SN 1313 | The Herbie Nichols Project | Love Is Proximity |
| SN 1314 | Drew Gress' Heyday | Jagged Sky |
| SN 1315 | Steve Lacy + 6 | The Cry |
| SN 1316 | Dave Douglas | Convergence |
| SN 1317 | Paul Nash | The Soul of Grace |
| SN 1318 | Frank Kimbrough | Noumena |
| SN 1319 | Civica Jazz Band | The Symphonic Ellington: Night Creature |
| SN 1320 | Giorgio Gaslini Globo Quartet | Ballets |
| SN 1321 | Enrico Pieranunzi Trio Ada Montellanico with Lee Konitz & Enrico Rava | Ma L'amore No |
| SN 1322 | Borah Bergman, Oliver Lake | A New Organisation |
| SN 1323 | Unused | |
| SN 1324 | Giovanni Falzone – Gaetano Partipilo – Mirko Signorile & New Trio | Live in Clusone |
| SN 1325 | Roberto Magris Europlane feat. Tony Lakatos | Check-In |
| SN 1326 | Antonio Ciacca Trio | Ugly Beauty |
| SN 1327 | Ran Blake, David Fabris | Indian Winter |
| SN 1328 | Glenn Horiuchi Unit(a) | Fair Play |
| SN 1329 | Cecilia Finotti | Nevermore |
| SN 1330 | Borah Bergman/Peter Brötzmann/Andrew Cyrille | Exhilaration |
| SN 1331 | Guido Manusardi Sextet | The Village Fair |
| SN 1332 | Roberto Ottaviano Trio | Live In Israel |
| SN 1333 | The Herbie Nichols Project | Dr. Cyclops' Dream |
| SN 1334 | Gianna Montecalvo | Steve's Mirror |
| SN 1335 | Claudio Fasoli Gammatrio | Stilla |
| SN 1336 | Gaetano Liguori/Andrew Cyrille/Guido Mazzon | When We Were Kings |
| SN 1337 | Nobu Stowe – Lee Pembleton Project | Hommage an Klaus Kinski |
| SN 1338 | Bill Dixon with Tony Oxley | Papyrus Volume II |
| SN 1339 | Sax Appeal Saxophone Quartet | Blowing |
| SN 1340 | Martial Solal Trio | Balade du 10 Mars |
| SN 1341 | Gianluigi Trovesi | Around Small Fairy Tales |
| SN 1342 | Borah Bergman and Roscoe Mitchell | The Italian Concert |
| SN 1343 | The Michael Marcus 3 | Live in N.Y. |
| SN 1344 | Unused | |
| SN 1345 | David Liebman/Gunnar Mossblad Ensemble | The Seasons Reflected |
| SN 1346 | Unused | |
| SN 1347 | Fabio Jegher | Life Tones and Film Colors |
| SN 1348 | Judi Silvano & Mal Waldron | Riding a Zephyr |
| SN 1349 | Grande Orchestra Nazionale di Jazz | Live |
| 121350/1-2 | Giorgio Gaslini | L'Integrale: Antologia cronologica 1-2 |
| 121352/3-2 | Giorgio Gaslini | L'Integrale: Antologia cronologica 3-4 |
| 121354/5-2 | Giorgio Gaslini | L'Integrale: Antologia cronologica 5-6 |
| 121373-2 | Greg Burk Trio – J.Robinson, B.Moses | Checking In |
| 121380-2 | Giorgio Gaslini | Cantos |
| 121385-2 | John Tchicai, Garrison Fewell, Tino Tracanna, Paolino Dalla Porta, and Massimo Manzi | Big Chief Dreaming |
| 121390-2 | Giorgio Gaslini/Proxima Centauri Orchestra | Enigma |
| 121393-2 | Greg Burk Quartet – J.Bergonzi, J.Robinson, G.Cleaver | Carpe Momentum |
| 121395-2 | Roberto Magris Europlane feat. Herb Geller | Il Bello del Jazz |
| 121397-2 | Nobu Stowe & Alan Munshower with Badal Roy | An die Musik |
| 121403-2 | Greg Burk Quartet – I.Dinne, J.Robinson, A.Marcelli | Berlin Bright |
| 121407-OD | Nobu Stowe | Confusion Bleue |
| 121420-2 | Giorgio Gaslini | Sacred Concert/Jazz Te Deum |
| 121425-OD | Roberto Magris & The Europlane Orchestra | Current Views |
| 121470-2 | Giorgio Gaslini/Proxima Centauri Orchestra | Urban Griot |
| 121490-2 | Giorgio Gaslini | Gaslini Plays Sun Ra |
