= Barking Hoop Recordings =

Independent record label

- Founded: 1999
- Founder: Kevin Norton
- Genre: Jazz
- Country of origin: U.S.

Barking Hoop Recordings is an independent record label founded by percussionist Kevin Norton in 1999. The label is dedicated to releasing new and original music. Barking Hoop has released music by Anthony Braxton, Joëlle Léandre, and the String Trio of New York with Oliver Lake.

== Discography ==
- For Guy Debord (in nine events), Kevin Norton Ensemble featuring Anthony Braxton
- In Context/Out of Context, Kevin Norton's Context Trio
- Sous Ratue, Kevin O'Neil Quartet
- 8 Standards (Wesleyan) 2001, Anthony Braxton Quartet
- Change Dance (Troubled Energy), Kevin Norton
- Kevin Norton and Haewon Min play the music of Anthony Braxton
- Ocean of Earth, Kevin Norton/Joelle Leandre/Tomas Ulrich
- Time Space Modulator, Kevin Norton's Bauhaus Quartet
- Frozen Ropes, String Trio of New York featuring Oliver Lake
- Born in Brooklyn, Instinctual Eye: Kevin Norton, Frode Gjerstad, Nick Stephens
- Hybrids, Billy Stein Trio
- Yimba Rudo, Yimba Rudo (Kevin Norton, Jim Pugliese, Steve LaSpina) (released July 2019)

== See also ==
- List of record labels
