= Natural Balance (album) =

Studio album by String Trio of New York
- Released: 1986
- Recorded: April 1 & 2, 1986
- Genre: Jazz
- Length: 42:10
- Label: Black Saint
- Producer: Giovanni Bonandrini

String Trio of New York chronology
Rebirth of a Feeling (1983)	Natural Balance (1986)	As Tears Go By (1987)

Natural Balance is the fifth album by American jazz group the String Trio of New York recorded in 1986 for the Italian Black Saint label.

== Reception ==
The Allmusic review by Scott Yanow awarded the album 4 stars stating "The six group originals on this set cover a great deal of ground and range from the accessible to the esoteric. An excellent outing".

Professional ratings
Review scores
Source	Rating
Allmusic	4/5 stars

== Track listing ==
1. "One for Frankfurt TV" (Billy Bang, James Emery) - 6:26
2. "Seven Vice" (John Lindberg) - 7:10
3. "Texas Koto Blues" (Emery) - 7:32
4. "Ground Work" (Lindberg) - 6:54
5. "Shadows in the Light" (Emery) - 8:42
6. "Going Through (Art Theme for A. R. Penck)" (Bang) - 5:38

- Recorded at Barigozzi Studio in Milano, Italy on April 1 & 2, 1986

== Personnel ==
- Billy Bang - violin
- James Emery - guitar
- John Lindberg - bass
