= Dewey Johnson (musician) =

American free jazz trumpeter (1939–2018)

- Birth name: Dewey Bernard Johnson
- Born: November 6, 1939; Philadelphia, Pennsylvania, US
- Died: June 26, 2018 (aged 78)
- Genres: Jazz, free jazz, avant-garde jazz
- Occupation: Musician
- Instrument: Trumpet

Dewey Bernard Johnson (November 6, 1939 – June 26, 2018) was an American free jazz trumpeter best known for his appearance on John Coltrane's historic recording Ascension.

== Early life ==
Johnson was born in Philadelphia, where he took lessons at the Granoff School of Music. In the early 1960s, he spent time in California, where he met and played with Byron Allen, Noah Howard, Sonny Simmons, and other musicians interested in free improvisation.

== New York ==
In 1963, Johnson moved to New York, where he played with Sun Ra and started a band with saxophonist Giuseppi Logan, bassist Reggie Johnson and drummer Rashied Ali. In 1964, Johnson participated in the historic "October Revolution in Jazz", a four-day music festival organized by trumpeter Bill Dixon, and also joined pianist Paul Bley's group. The following year, he appeared on Bley's album Barrage. Johnson also played with saxophonists Pharoah Sanders and Marion Brown and repeatedly sat in with John Coltrane's band. Eventually Coltrane invited him to participate in the recording of Ascension, on which he takes the second solo, following Coltrane and preceding Sanders.

In the spring of 1967, Johnson played in the Rashied Ali Quintet, recordings of which were released more than fifty years later. Following Coltrane's death in July of that year, Johnson suffered a nervous breakdown and was hospitalized. After dropping out of the music scene for a few years and living as a homeless person, Johnson joined a collective improvisation group known as The Music Ensemble, which also featured drummer Roger Baird, violinist Billy Bang, trumpeter Malik Baraka, saxophonist Daniel Carter, and bassists Earl Freeman and William Parker, and began to support himself with various odd jobs.

== Later life ==
In the early 1980s, while working at Ali's Alley, a club run by Rashied Ali, Johnson met and formed a trio with drummer Paul Murphy and pianist Mary Anne Driscoll. The group frequently performed in lofts and, supplemented by saxophonist Jimmy Lyons and bassoonist Karen Borca, recorded two albums. In 1984, Johnson again fell on hard times and became homeless. He later lived at the Coler Specialty Hospital on Roosevelt Island in New York City. He died in 2018.

== Family ==
Johnson's brother Lionel "Sonny" Johnson was a bass player. He replaced Jimmy Garrison upon the latter's departure from John Coltrane's group in 1966, and played with Coltrane throughout the second half of that year. He can be heard on the album Offering: Live at Temple University, recorded in November, 1966.

== Discography ==
With John Coltrane

- Ascension (Impulse!, recorded 1965, released 1966)
- The Best of John Coltrane: His Greatest Years, Vol. 2 (Impulse!, 1972 re-release of Ascension)
- The Major Works of John Coltrane (GRP Records, 1992 re-release of Ascension)
- The Impulse! Albums, Vol. 3 (Impulse!, 2009 re-release of Ascension)

With Paul Bley

- Barrage (ESP-Disk, recorded 1964, released 1965)

With Paul Murphy

- Red Snapper: Paul Murphy at CBS (CIMP, recorded 1982, released 2003)
- Cloudburst: Paul Murphy at RCA (Murphy Records, recorded and released 1983)

With Rashied Ali

- First Time Out: Live at Slugs 1967 (Survival Records, recorded 1967, released 2020)

Compilations

- Fire Music, Vol. 1: A High Energy Avant Garde Jazz Compilation (ESP-Disk, 2012 re-release of a track from Paul Bley's album Barrage)
