= Gene Ess =

American jazz musician

Gene Ess is a Japanese-American jazz guitarist. He was a member of the Rashied Ali Quintet, working with Ravi Coltrane, Archie Shepp, Lonnie Plaxico, and Reggie Workman.

== Career ==
Ess was born Gene Shimosato in Tokyo, Japan, and raised in Okinawa on an American military base. In his early teens, he was a performing musician in Okinawa. He studied classical music at George Mason University, then attended Berklee College of Music, where he became interested in jazz, particularly the music of John Coltrane.

Ess moved to New York City and became a member of a band led by Rashied Ali. He toured with Ali and recorded on his album No One in Particular. While in this group, he played with Ravi Coltrane, Eddie Henderson, Carlos Santana, Archie Shepp, and Reggie Workman

Ess's album Modes of Limited Transcendence (2009) received the 2010 SESAC Outstanding Jazz Performance Award. The album includes compositions by Ess and pianist Tigran Hamasyan. In 2012, he released A Thousand Summers, which contains vocals by Nicki Parrott.

Following this, Ess released Fractal Attraction (2013), which continues his exploration of voice in a chamber group setting. The album was recorded with Thana Alexa on vocals, David Berkman on piano, Thomas Kneeland on drums, and Gene Jackson on drums. Ess has also worked with Al Foster, Slide Hampton, Dave Liebman, and Clark Terry.

== Discography ==
=== As leader ===
- Sunrise Falling (Amp, 2003)
- Sandbox and Sanctum (Simp, 2005)
- Modes of Limited Transcendence (Simp, 2008)
- A Thousand Summers (Simp, 2012)
- Fractal Attraction (Simp, 2013)
- Eternal Monomyth (Simp, 2015)
- Absurdist Theater (Simp, 2016)
- Apotheosis (Simp, 2018)
- Ah-Bop (Simp, 2022)

=== As sideman ===
- One World Tribe, Prayer for September (Paddle Wheel, 1995)
- Rashied Ali, No One in Particular (Survival, 2001)
