= Judgment Day (album) =

Studio album by Rashied Ali Quintet
- Released: 2006
- Recorded: February 17 and 18, 2005
- Studio: Survival Studio, New York City
- Genre: Jazz
- Label: Survival Records; SR121/SR122
- Producer: Rashied Ali

Rashied Ali chronology
The Dynamic Duo Remember Trane and Bird (2004)	Judgment Day (2006)	Going to the Ritual (2008)

Judgment Day, Volumes 1 and 2, is a pair of albums by the Rashied Ali Quintet, led by drummer Ali, and featuring saxophonist Lawrence Clark, trumpeter Jumaane Smith, pianist Greg Murphy, and bassist Joris Teepe. They were recorded on February 17 and 18, 2005, at Survival Studio in New York City, and were released in 2006 by Ali's Survival Records.

In comparison with Ali's previous releases, the music on Judgment Day is relatively straight-ahead. However, regarding his role in the quintet, Ali noted: "It's not like I'm playing really straight-ahead drums. It might sound like that on the surface, but underneath you'll hear a lot of stuff that says I'm really an avant-garde player."

== Reception ==
Professional ratings
Review scores
Source	Rating
AllMusic Volume 1	4/5 stars
AllMusic Volume 2	3.5/5 stars
The Penguin Guide to Jazz Volumes 1 and 2	3/4 stars
All About Jazz Volume 1	4/5 stars
All About Jazz Volume 1	3.5/5 stars

In a review for AllMusic, Michael G. Nastos called Volume 1 "a rock-solid recording from beginning to end" and "a crown jewel in Ali's small discography," noting that "all of those interested in modern mainstream jazz should pay close attention to it." Regarding Volume 2, he remarked: "Ali's quintet accounts well for itself as a fully realized modern and progressive jazz ensemble that should be known for its excellence and high-level musicianship."

The authors of The Penguin Guide to Jazz Recordings wrote: "Ali still commands centre stage much of the time, but this is very much a working unit with what sounds like a healthily collective philosophy and approach."

Dusted Magazine's Marc Medwin stated: "The quintet, diverse in age and background, manages to sound unified without any player losing individuality... These are fantastic discs that exist inside the tradition while offering repeated opportunities for its fresh appraisal."

Chris Kelsey of JazzTimes commented: "There's plenty of blowing room, to be sure, but the tunes themselves are meticulously composed and arranged. It swings in a way guaranteed to make the Lincoln Center cats swallow hard and take notice. At times it's nearly straight-ahead, yet unlike latter-day hard bop, it is a music of the here and now with hints of jazz to come."

Writing for Jazzwise, Kevin Le Gendre called Volume 2 "a rip-roaringly hard-swinging album that has the kind of tricky gymnastic heads and charged solos that Blakey's most aggressive line-ups all juggled so well," and stated that it is "proof positive that Ali... is a complete musician, one who shows that mainstream vocabulary is not beyond the reach of a master of the avant-garde."

In an article for All About Jazz, Erik R. Quick described Volume 1 as "an effective display of Ali's straight-ahead chops and his ability to organize a group of relatively younger musicians," while AAJ's Russ Musto called Volume 2 "primarily a fine blowing date with intelligently composed charts built around Ali's uniquely cliché-free personal style."

== Track listings ==
=== Volume 1 ===
1. "Sidewalks in Motion" (Frank Lowe) – 6:04
2. "Dania" (Jaco Pastorius) – 8:48
3. "You're Reading My Mind" (Joris Teepe) – 6:54
4. "Judgment Day" (Lawrence Clark) – 8:17
5. "Shied Indeed" (Jumaane Smith) – 5:39
6. "Raw Fish" (Joris Teepe) – 5:58
7. "The Big Push" (Wayne Shorter) – 7:19
8. "M.O." (James Ulmer) – 4:38
9. "Multi Culti" (Don Cherry) – 6:28

=== Volume 2 ===
1. "Skane's Refrain" (Greg Murphy) – 7:09
2. "Lush Life" (Billy Strayhorn) – 9:42
3. "Thing for Joe" (James Ulmer) – 8:03
4. "Judgment Day" (Lawrence Clark) – 8:18
5. "Flight #643" (Joris Teepe) – 6:09
6. "Round Midnite" (Thelonious Monk) – 7:40
7. "Yesterday (J. Man) Tomorrow" (Jumaane Smith) – 5:28
8. "Multi Culti" (Don Cherry) – 6:43

== Personnel ==
- Rashied Ali – drums
- Lawrence Clark – tenor saxophone
- Jumaane Smith – trumpet
- Greg Murphy – piano
- Joris Teepe – bass
