= Going to the Ritual =

Live album by Henry Grimes and Rashied Ali
- Released: 2008
- Recorded: 2007
- Venue: WKCR studios
- Genre: Jazz
- Label: Porter Records; PRCD - 4005
- Producer: Margaret Davis

Rashied Ali chronology
| Judgment Day (2006) | Going to the Ritual (2008) | Eddie Jefferson at Ali's Alley (2009) |

Going to the Ritual is a live album by bassist Henry Grimes and drummer Rashied Ali. It was recorded in 2007 in concert at WKCR studios, Columbia University, New York City, and was released by Porter Records in 2008.

== Reception ==
Professional ratings
Review scores
| Source | Rating |
|---|---|
| AllMusic | 3.5/5 stars |
| All About Jazz | 3.5/5 stars |

In a review for AllMusic, Michael G. Nastos wrote: "In one of the last recordings before he passed away, drummer Rashied Ali proves with every slash, riff, and paradiddle why he belonged in the pantheon of improvising percussionists well past his time with John Coltrane. In duets with well-matched partner and bassist Henry Grimes, this set shows how locked in these natives of Philadelphia... are with their estimable heritage in making free jazz that still sounds fresh some 50 years after the movement was founded. There's a rambling kind of empathy, focused but rarely intense that is clear from the outset."

Writing for All About Jazz, Glenn Astarita commented: "What might be considered a bold move, given the scanty bass and drums format, the duo separates the boys from the men via the polyrhythmic flows featuring emotive voicings and changeable parameters... The duo generates an abundance of scrappy workouts amid an amalgamation of explorative exchanges throughout the preponderance of this vibrant and curiously interesting set. No doubt, only a select few could pull this off. It's a marvel of inventiveness, sparked by the artists streaming creative juices and synergistic interplay." In a separate review for the same publication, John Sharpe remarked: "Though sustaining interest over 55 minutes with just bass and drums might seem an impossibility, the two veterans carry it off with aplomb... the subtext is that they nonetheless benefit from common ground and the capacity for instant design that comes from hard-won experience."

== Track listing ==
1. "Hidden Forces Aggregate" (Ali) - 17:47
2. "Easternal Mysticism, Virtue and Calm" (Grimes) - 1:22
3. "Gone Beyond the Gate" (Grimes) - 25:45
4. "This Must Have Always Happened" (Grimes, Ali) - 10:31

== Personnel ==
- Henry Grimes – bass, violin, voice
- Rashied Ali – drums
