= Rashied Ali Quintet =

Studio album by Rashied Ali Quintet
- Released: 1973
- Recorded: 1973
- Studio: Marzette Watts's studio, New York City
- Genre: Free jazz
- Length: 35:11
- Label: Survival Records; SR 102

Rashied Ali chronology
| Duo Exchange (1973) | Rashied Ali Quintet (1973) | New Directions in Modern Music (1973) |

Rashied Ali Quintet is an album by the free jazz ensemble of the same name, led by drummer Ali, and featuring saxophonist Bob Ralston, trumpeter Earl Cross, guitarist James Blood Ulmer, and bassist John Dana. It was recorded during 1973 at Marzette Watts's studio in New York City, and was released on vinyl that year by Ali's Survival Records. In 1999, the album was reissued on CD by Survival in conjunction with the Knit Classics label. The recording marks one of Ulmer's first recorded appearances.

== Reception ==
Professional ratings
Review scores
| Source | Rating |
|---|---|
| AllMusic | 2.5/5 stars |
| The Penguin Guide to Jazz | 3/4 stars |
| The Virgin Encyclopedia of Jazz | 3/5 stars |

In a review for AllMusic, Wilson McCloy called the album "an exciting effort," and wrote: "The music is potentially off-putting to listeners unfamiliar with Ulmer's dissonant chord comping and the ebbs and flows of Rashied Ali's sound/time keeping. However, the exuberant improvisations and seamlessly structured arrangements make this a truly invigorating set."

The authors of The Penguin Guide to Jazz Recordings called the album "oddly disappointing," but noted the significance of "an early glimpse" of Ulmer.

Steve Koenig of Perfect Sound Forever called the tracks "solid in their own right, and historically interesting," and noted that, despite the fact that "the sound quality is as raw as the playing," "you don't have to strain for the music; it's right up front with lots of air and space."

== Track listing ==
1. "Adrees" (Rashied Ali) – 16:55
2. "Theme for Captain Black" (James Ulmer) – 18:13

== Personnel ==
- Rashied Ali – drums, percussion
- Bob Ralston – tenor saxophone
- Earl Cross – trumpet
- James Blood Ulmer – guitar
- John Dana – bass
