= New Directions in Modern Music =

Live album by Rashied Ali Quartet
- Released: 1973
- Recorded: 1971
- Venue: The East, Brooklyn, New York
- Genre: Free jazz
- Length: 43:36
- Label: Survival Records; SR 104

Rashied Ali chronology
| Rashied Ali Quintet (1973) | New Directions in Modern Music (1973) | Moon Flight (1976) |

New Directions in Modern Music is a live album by the Rashied Ali Quartet. It was recorded at The East in Brooklyn, New York, during 1971, and was released in 1973 by Ali's Survival Records. On the album, Ali is featured on drums and percussion, and is joined by saxophonist and flutist Carlos Ward, pianist Fred Simmons, and bassist Stafford James. In 1999, the recording was reissued by Survival in conjunction with Knit Classics.

Ali stated that the quartet, which stayed together for about three years, was "the first group that I got together after Trane died, after I went to Europe and got that whole thing out of my system." The band eventually broke up because "it got to the point where were weren't working at all and everyone was such a good musician, and getting calls from other people." The group's regular pianist was Don Pullen; however, he was unable to attend the recording session, and was replaced by Simmons.

== Reception ==
Professional ratings
Review scores
| Source | Rating |
|---|---|
| AllMusic | 5/5 stars |
| The Penguin Guide to Jazz | 3/4 stars |
| The Virgin Encyclopedia of Jazz | 4/5 stars |
| The Encyclopedia of Popular Music | 4/5 stars |

In a review for AllMusic, Wilson McCloy wrote: "yet another rewarding recording from the Survival archives... All of the early Survival albums include long Ali solo sections, so be forewarned; but be aware that these musicians will be pushing the limits of jazz expression. The music is the reward."

The authors of The Penguin Guide to Jazz Recordings stated: "Ward's fiery and beautifully structured solo on 'As-Salaam-Alikum' is a perfect representation of what came to be known as Fire Music, with all of its spirituality as well as intensity."

== Track listings ==
Composed by Rashied Ali.

1. "As-Salaam-Alikum" – 21:47
2. "Akela" – 20:48

== Personnel ==
- Rashied Ali – drums, percussion
- Carlos Ward – alto saxophone, flute
- Fred Simmons – piano
- Stafford James – bass, violin
