= Live in Europe (Rashied Ali Quintet album) =

Live album by Rashied Ali Quintet
- Released: 2009
- Recorded: November 2, 2007
- Venue: Jazz Happening, Tampere, Finland
- Genre: Free jazz
- Length: 1:07:23
- Label: Survival Records; SR 126

Rashied Ali chronology
Cutt'n Korners (2009)	Live in Europe (2009)	Spirits Aloft (2010)

Live in Europe is a live album by American jazz ensemble Rashied Ali Quintet, led by drummer Ali, and featuring saxophonist Lawrence Clark, trumpeter Josh Evans, pianist Greg Murphy, and bassist Joris Teepe. Featuring two long performances of pieces by Ali's former bandmate James "Blood" Ulmer, it was recorded on November 2, 2007, at Jazz Happening in Tampere, Finland, and was issued in 2009 by Ali's label, Survival Records.

The album's release, which occurred shortly before Ali's death, was celebrated by a live performance at New York's Zinc Bar. According to his widow, Patricia, "he was at the top of his game until his last day."

== Reception ==
Professional ratings
Review scores
Source	Rating
AllMusic	4/5 stars
The Free Jazz Collective	4/5 stars

In a review for AllMusic, Alex Henderson called the album "a consistently absorbing document of Ali's Jazz Happening appearance," and stated that "both sides of Ali -- his avant-garde side and his post-bop side -- assert themselves with exciting, often explosive results."

A writer for The Free Jazz Collective wrote: "The music is great, nothing boundary-breaking, but quite entertaining, showing that even at the age of 76, Rashied Ali was still among the best drummers."

Josef Woodard of JazzTimes called the band an "impressive, loosely avant-spirited quintet" that "engagingly splits the difference of freedom and structure," and commented: "Ali's real artistic sense of direction ran simultaneously forward and backward while always managing to sound current."

Writing for All About Jazz, Kurt Gottschalk called the album "a surprising step" on Ali's musical journey, on which the drummer "soldiers on along the path Trane set," and praised the performance of "Theme for Captain Black," which is "energetically played, particularly by Ali and... Teepe, who leaps out across the set."

== Track listing ==
1. "Intro" – 0:36
2. "Theme for Captain Black" (James Ulmer) – 25:58
3. "Lourana" (Lawrence Clark) – 11:42
4. "Thing for Joe" (James Ulmer) – 29:06

== Personnel ==
- Rashied Ali – drums
- Lawrence Clark – tenor saxophone
- Josh Evans – trumpet
- Greg Murphy – piano
- Joris Teepe – bass
