= Spirits Aloft =

Live album by Henry Grimes and Rashied Ali
- Released: 2010
- Recorded: February 7, 2009
- Venue: Gordon Theatre, Camden Center for the Arts, Rutgers University, Camden, New Jersey
- Genre: Free jazz
- Label: Porter Records; PRCD - 4049
- Producer: Margaret Davis Grimes

Rashied Ali chronology
Live in Europe (2009)	Spirits Aloft (2010)	First Time Out: Live at Slugs 1967 (2020)

Spirits Aloft is a live album by bassist Henry Grimes and drummer Rashied Ali. It was recorded in February 2009 at Rutgers University in Camden, New Jersey, and was released by Porter Records in 2010.

== Reception ==
Professional ratings
Review scores
Source	Rating
AllMusic	4/5 stars

In a review for AllMusic, Phil Freeman wrote: "On this recording, Grimes switches back and forth between bass and violin, and between somewhat conventional free jazz playing and atmospheric pieces during which neither he nor Ali offer any kind of melodic or rhythmic structure, instead improvising in a quietly intense way that forces the listener to wonder who's making what sound... When the bassist first reappeared on the scene, he was extremely rusty, but free jazz fans welcomed him back because of his pedigree. With this release, and a few before it, he proves that his chops have returned and he's every bit the player he was in the '60s."

Writing for All About Jazz, Tim Niland commented: "The music appears to be completely improvised and works quite well, with Grimes deftly switching from plucked to bowed bass and adding swirls of violin to the action while Ali continually shifts the music... This was one of Ali's final recordings before passing away in 2009, and it is clear that he was a creative force right up until the end. Grimes continues to amaze, as his storybook comeback to the musical Universe continues unabated."

Writing for London Jazz News, Geoff Winston remarked: "Both masters had that supreme confidence to jointly direct their dialogue and take the audience with them. Grimes said in his moving tribute at Ali's memorial celebration later in 2009, quoted in the sleeve notes, 'Rashied knew how to cause music to have life and give life.' The same can be said for Grimes, and this spirit is the essence of this wonderful recording, every nuance so expertly captured that the listener gets as close as is possible to being there on the night."

== Track listing ==
1. "Moments (Poem)" – 0:34
2. "Rapid Transit" – 14:50
3. "Oceans of the Clouds" – 7:32
4. "Larger Astronomical Time" – 4:49
5. "Arcopanorama" – 10:21
6. "Priordained" – 14:10
7. "The Arch Stairwells (Poem)" – 2:00

== Personnel ==
- Henry Grimes – bass, violin, voice
- Rashied Ali – drums
