= The Gowanus Session =

Studio album by Thollem McDonas, Nels Cline & William Parker
- Released: April 17, 2012
- Recorded: January 3, 2012
- Studio: Peter Karl Studios, Gowanus Arts Building, Brooklyn, NY
- Genre: Jazz
- Length: 41:02
- Label: Porter; PRCD 4068

Nels Cline chronology
Initiate (2010)	The Gowanus Session (2012)	Macroscope (2014)

William Parker chronology
Crumbling in the Shadows is Fraulein Miller's Stale Cake (2011)	The Gowanus Session (2012)	Essence of Ellington (2012)

The Gowanus Session is an album by pianist Thollem McDonas, guitarist Nels Cline, and bassist William Parker recorded in 2012 for the Porter label.

== Reception ==
Professional ratings
Review scores
Source	Rating
All About Jazz	4.5/5 stars

The All About Jazz review by Glenn Astarita awarded the album 4½ stars stating "Glaring expressionism coupled with rip-roaring layers of acoustic-electric sound-sculpting maneuvers yield the bountiful fruit on this manifold studio date". JazzTimes' Steve Greenlea said "pianist Thollem McDonas, bassist William Parker and electric guitarist Nels Cline play seemingly indiscriminately, creating unmusical layers of sound. These are not songs. There are no melodies, no rhythms. The Gowanus Session is a sound sculpture... So is this a good record, or even an enjoyable one? I really don’t know, but I do know this: It’s interesting, and I keep listening to it."

== Track listing ==
All compositions by Nels Cline, Thollem McDonas & William Parker

1. "There Are" - 7:32
2. "As Many Worlds" - 4:42
3. "In A Life" - 5:57
4. "As There Are" - 2:15
5. "Lives" - 15:43
6. "In The World." - 4:53

== Personnel ==
- Thollem McDonas - piano
- Nels Cline - electric guitar
- William Parker - bass
