= Rhames =

Rhames is a surname. Notable people with the surname include:

- Arthur Rhames (1957–1989), American musician
- Ving Rhames (born 1959), American actor
