= Live at Tonic =

Live at Tonic may refer to:

- Live at Tonic (Christian McBride album)
- Live at Tonic (Marco Benevento album)
- Live at Tonic (Rashied Ali, Louis Belogenis, and Wilber Morris album)

== See also ==
- Masada Live at Tonic 1999
- Live at Tonic 2001, 2001 Masada album
- Tonic (music venue)
