= N.Y. Ain't So Bad =

N.Y. Ain't So Bad: Ali Plays the Blues

Studio album by Rashied Ali featuring Royal Blue
- Released: 1976
- Recorded: July 12, 1975; August 26, 1975
- Genre: Jazz, blues
- Length: 35:34
- Label: Survival Records; SR 111

Rashied Ali chronology
Moon Flight (1976)	N.Y. Ain't So Bad: Ali Plays the Blues (1976)	Swift Are the Winds of Life (1976)

N.Y. Ain't So Bad: Ali Plays the Blues is an album by drummer Rashied Ali that features blues singer Royal Blue. It was recorded during July and August, 1975, and was released on vinyl in 1976 by Ali's Survival Records. In 1999, it was reissued on CD by Survival in conjunction with the Knit Classics label. On the album, Ali and Blue are joined by saxophonists Marvin Blackman and James Vass, pianist Charles Eubanks, and bassist Benny Wilson.

N.Y. Ain't So Bad marks Royal Blue's only recorded appearance. According to Ali, shortly after the session, the vocalist was beaten to death with a pipe following a domestic quarrel, and his body was dumped on the street. Ali stated that Blue "was the only one of the younger cats who was singing from the heart," and reflected: "He was really articulate in his words, and if you listen to his songs, you can really hear where we was coming from. It was incredible; you don't have to know him, you can know him from his music."

== Reception ==
Professional ratings
Review scores
Source	Rating
AllMusic	4/5 stars
The Penguin Guide to Jazz	3/4 stars
The Virgin Encyclopedia of Jazz	3/5 stars

In a review for AllMusic, Thom Jurek called the album an "all but lost gem, which, in a late modern context, reveals the true roots of jazz," and wrote: "In these seemingly 'straight' blues tunes, a jazz quintet is being itself, stretching the tunes, offering overtones as possibilities, and moving it on over into another space entirely, while firmly remaining a band that backs a blues singer."

The authors of The Penguin Guide to Jazz Recordings described the band as "strong," but stated that "the chemistry isn't compelling."

Michael J. West of JazzTimes called Blue "a joyful baritone in the Jimmy Rushing tradition," and commented: "In an earlier era of jazz, the 'New Thing' players were often accused of abandoning or indeed never properly learning the tradition; N.Y. Ain't So Bad is as deeply immersed in it as any mainstream jazz record."

Author Will Hermes singled out "Moontipping" for praise, calling it "the record's most magical moment," with "Ali's scatter-groove conjuring both swing and clave without pledging allegiance to either, Royal Blue floating above."

Steve Koenig of Perfect Sound Forever noted that Blue was "clearly from the Texas blue tradition," with a voice that "slurs like the horns do." He remarked: "He'll stretch out, yet soft, sweet, single notes are there too."

== Track listing ==
1. "New York Ain't So Bad" (Royal Blue) – 3:00
2. "Boss Home Town Love" (Royal Blue) – 4:40
3. "Moontipping" (Royal Blue) – 5:00
4. "Everyday" (B.B. King) – 4:45
5. "Ladies and Gentleman Blues" (Royal Blue) – 6:42
6. "Real Blues" (Royal Blue) – 4:15
7. "Royal's Blues" (Royal Blue) – 3:40
8. "Stormy Monday" (T. Bone Walker) – 5:55
- Tracks 1–4 and 6 were recorded on August 26, 1975. Tracks 5, 7, and 8 were recorded on July 12, 1975.

== Personnel ==
- Rashied Ali – drums
- Royal Blue – vocals
- Marvin Blackman – tenor saxophone, flute
- James Vass – alto saxophone, flute
- Charles Eubanks – piano
- Benny Wilson – bass
