= Joris Teepe =

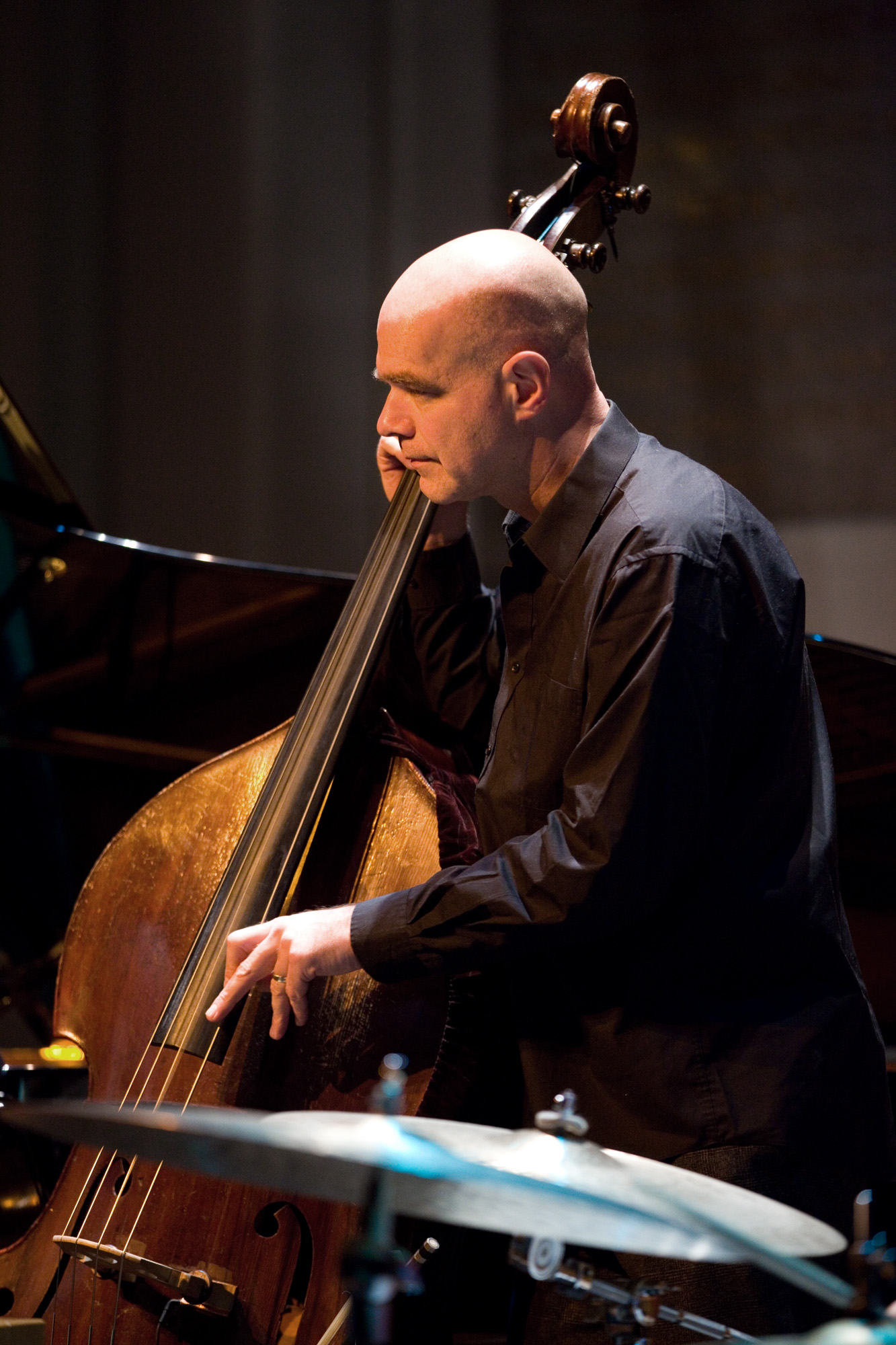

Background information
- Born: The Hague, Netherlands
- Genres: Jazz
- Occupation: Musician
- Instrument: Bass
- Years active: 1990s–present
- Website: joristeepe.com

Joris Teepe is a Dutch jazz bassist, composer, arranger, and big-band leader. He plays contemporary jazz, bebop, and free jazz.

== Biography ==
Teepe studied at the Conservatory of Amsterdam. In 1992, he moved to New York City, where he recorded his first album as a leader in 1993, with the American tenor saxophone player Don Braden, sidemen trumpeter Tom Harrell, pianist Cyrus Chestnut, and drummer Carl Allen, with Braden acting as co-leader. A second album by a very similar group was released in 1996. After this, he played and recorded with several groups: a trio (the Intercontinental Jazz Trio, with Shingo Okudaira and Tim Armacost) and groups that almost always included Don Braden. He also played alongside Randy Brecker and Chris Potter.

More recently, he started working with larger bands, such as the Groningen Art Ensemble (which, in addition to Braden, included among others, trumpeter Brian Lynch and trombonist Conrad Herwig) and the Joris Teepe Big Band. Many songs he plays and records are original compositions, but he also arranges other people's material, such as the music of Duke Ellington, Billy Strayhorn and John Coltrane. He has also written for larger ensembles and even symphonic orchestras.

Teepe also actively works as a sideman, arranger, and producer for other musicians. He has collaborated with, among others, Joey Berkley, Ron Jackson, Darrell Grant, Antonio Ciacca, Mathilde Santing, Deborah Brown, Fay Claassen, and was a long time member of the Rashied Ali Band. Furthermore, Teepe is active in jazz-education: he is head of the jazz department at the Prins Claus Conservatoire in Groningen, and teaches bass at the New Jersey Performing Arts Center.

Teepe has been a resident of Teaneck, New Jersey.

== Discography ==
=== As leader ===
- Pay as You Earn (Mons, 1994)
- Bottom Line (Mons, 1996)
- Live at the Bimhuis (Via, 1997)
- Seven Days a Week (Via, 1998)
- Firm Roots (Via, 1999)
- For Adults Only (Postcards, 2000)
- Jazz in Jazz Out (Planet Arts, 2003)
- Going Dutch (Twinz, 2004)
- We Take No Prisoners (Challenge, 2009)
- Conversations (Creative Perspective, 2016)
- In the Spirit of Rashied Ali (Jazz Tribes, 2018)
- In the Spirit of Herbie Hancock with Don Braden (OAP, 2020)

=== As sideman ===
- Rashied Ali, Judgment Day (Survival, 2006)
- Rashied Ali, Live in Europe (Survival, 2009)
- Rashied Ali, Live at the Zinc Bar (Jazz Intensity, 2012)
- Don Braden, Landing Zone (Landmark, 1995)
- Don Braden, Gentle Storm (HighNote, 2008)
- Antonio Ciacca, Autumn in New York (Splasc(h), 2002)
- Lewis Porter, Trio Solo (Unseen Rain, 2013)
- Jeanfrançois Prins, El Gaucho Challenge, 2012

== Notes ==
- Muziek Encyclopedie - Joris Teepe page
