= Moon Flight =

Studio album by Rashied Ali Quartet / Quintet
- Released: 1976
- Recorded: August 26, 1975
- Studio: Studio 77, New York City
- Genre: Free jazz
- Length: 42:58
- Label: Survival Records; SR 109

Rashied Ali chronology
New Directions in Modern Music (1973)	Moon Flight (1976)	N.Y. Ain't So Bad (1976)

Moon Flight is an album by drummer Rashied Ali on which he is featured in quartet and quintet settings. It was recorded on August 26, 1975, at Studio 77 in New York City, and was released on vinyl in 1976 by Ali's Survival Records. In 1999, it was reissued on CD by Survival in conjunction with the Knit Classics label. On the album, Ali is joined by saxophonists Marvin Blackman and James Vass, pianist Charles Eubanks, and bassist Benny Wilson.

== Reception ==
Professional ratings
Review scores
Source	Rating
AllMusic	4/5 stars
The Penguin Guide to Jazz	3.5/4 stars
The Virgin Encyclopedia of Jazz	3/5 stars

In a review for AllMusic, Al Campbell noted that the band "didn't have to struggle to keep up with" Ali's polyrhythmic approach, and stated that the "free jazz landscape" of four of the album's tracks is nicely balanced by the inclusion of Mal Waldron's "Soul Eyes" and John Coltrane's "Naima".

The authors of The Penguin Guide to Jazz Recordings commented that, in relation to the other Survival releases, "this is probably the only one that stands up entirely on its own terms," and suggested that the two ballads are "a sign perhaps that this is a gentler, more reflective and lyrical Ali."

Steve Koenig of Perfect Sound Forever called the album "solid jazz by a coherent group who'd played together a few years," and "a fine example of what they do," and described Ali's playing as "free and propulsive, yet delicate and intricate, using his whole kit."

== Track listing ==
1. "Blood on the Cross" (Rashied Ali) – 7:10
2. "Soul Eyes" (Mal Waldron) – 9:20
3. "Moon Flight" (Marvin Blackman) – 5:17
4. "A Light" (James Vass) – 8:05
5. "Naima" (John Coltrane) – 7:38
6. "Face of Forgotten Thought" (Zahir Batin) – 6:12

== Personnel ==
- Rashied Ali – drums
- Marvin Blackman – tenor saxophone (tracks 1, 2, 3, 5, 6)
- James Vass – alto saxophone (tracks 1, 2, 4)
- Charles Eubanks – piano
- Benny Wilson – bass
