= John Esposito (pianist) =

American jazz pianist (b.1953)

- Born: John Esposito c. 1953
- Origin: Brooklyn, New York USA
- Genres: Jazz
- Occupation: Pianist
- Instrument: Piano

John Esposito (born 1953) is an American jazz pianist of advanced bebop tendencies. Known as a composer for his own groups and a versatile sideman capable of all styles from stride piano to free improvisation, he is a pianist highly influenced by modernism (Bartók in particular), and capable of playing off of several rhythmic and harmonic levels at once. As manifested in music for his quintet (with Eric Person on sax, Greg Glassman on trumpet, Kenny Davis on bass, and Pete O'Brien on drums) and trio (with Ira Coleman on bass and Pete O'Brien on drums), Esposito's compositions are couched in an expansion of bebop harmony, often using rhythmic schemes of complex and subtle metric modulation. Some of his pieces are transformations of jazz standards rendered unrecognizable by such techniques as running the chord progression backwards, or using a complex system of chord substitutions.

Born in Brooklyn, Esposito was raised in the Hudson Valley in a family that included policemen but also artists and musicians. His grandfather, a violin maker, was a jazz violinist and reed player, and played in the 1920s with the Paul Whiteman Orchestra. Esposito attended the State University of New York at Albany. Majoring in musical composition, he drew influences from visiting composers who came through, including John Cage, Robert Ashley, Frederic Rzewski, and Elliott Carter. At the same time, however, he found himself drawn more to improvisation, and, despite a rather late start, took up jazz piano. (As a teenager, he had already played harmonica in a blues band.) In 1980 Esposito moved to New York City, where he worked with saxophonist Arthur Rhames, a neglected, almost forgotten figure who died of AIDS-related illness at 32 (1989), and who some nevertheless feel was the successor to John Coltrane's mantle as the greatest creative performer on that instrument.

Esposito played in the Arthur Rhames Quartet for five years, and in 1987 launched his own jazz quintet called Second Sight, with Dave Douglas, Jeff Marx, Allen Murphy, Jeff Siegel, and Fred Berryhill. Notables he's performed with are Thurman Barker, Nick Brignola, Roy Campbell, Santi Debriano, Carter Jefferson, John Lindberg, Erica Lindsay, Joe Lovano, J. R. Monterose, David "Fathead" Newman, and Roswell Rudd. He has also recorded with Rashied Ali, Dave Douglas, Dave Holland, Franklin Kiermyer, Jeff Marx, Eric Person, Arthur Rhames, Sam Rivers, Pharoah Sanders, Michael Stuart, and John Stubblefield among others. In the 1990s he gradually (first as an adjunct faculty and later as a visiting professor) joined the faculty of Bard College, where he teaches jazz piano, literature, and harmony. (One of his theory students was fellow faculty member Kyle Gann). In 2006 Esposito formed his own record label SunJump in order to bring out recordings of his own groups and historical recordings in his archive.

== Discography (group - title - year issued - label) ==
- John Esposito Quintet: The Blue People - 2006 - SunJump
- John Esposito Trio: Down Blue Marlin Road - 2006 - SunJump
- Eric Person: Reflection, the best of collection - 2007- Distinction Records
- Eric Person: More Tales to Tell - 1997 - Soul Note Records
- Eric Person and Meta-Four: Live at Big Sur- 2003- Distinction Records
- Eric Person and Meta-Four: Extra Pressure - 1999 - Distinction Records
- Franklin Kiermyer: Sanctification - 1999 - Mobility Music/Sunship Records
- Franklin Kiermyer: Kairos - 1996 - Evidence Music
- Franklin Kiermyer, Pharoah Sanders, John Esposito, Drew Gress: Solomon's Daughter - 1994 - Evidence Music
