= No One in Particular =

Studio album by Rashied Ali Quintet
- Released: 2001
- Recorded: June 25, 1992
- Studio: The Studio, 102 Greene Street, New York City
- Genre: Jazz
- Length: 49:05
- Label: Survival Records; SR 100
- Producer: Gene Shimosato, Rashied Ali

Rashied Ali chronology
Deals, Ideas & Ideals (2001)	No One in Particular (2001)	The Dynamic Duo Remember Trane and Bird (2004)

No One in Particular is an album by the Rashied Ali Quintet, led by drummer Ali, and featuring saxophonist Ravi Coltrane, guitarist Gene Ess (Gene Shimosato), pianist Greg Murphy, and bassist Matthew Garrison. It was recorded on June 25, 1992, at The Studio, located at 102 Greene Street, New York City, and was released in 2001 by Ali's Survival Records.

During 1965–1967, Ali played in a group led by John Coltrane, Ravi Coltrane's father, alongside Jimmy Garrison, Matthew Garrison's father. Regarding the inclusion of the two younger musicians on the album, Ali commented: "I got both of the kids there and that is ironic because I knew those kids before they knew themselves. I knew their mothers when they were pregnant with them guys."

== Reception ==
Professional ratings
Review scores
Source	Rating
The Penguin Guide to Jazz	3.5/4 stars

The authors of The Penguin Guide to Jazz Recordings stated that Ali "keeps the metre fairly tight and straightforward, though at a couple of junctures he sounds (ironically) much like the later Elvin Jones, who led a very similar band."

In a review for All About Jazz, David Adler called Garrison "the most compelling soloist on this session, next to Ali himself," and noted that although Coltrane "sounds rough and unformed," his soprano saxophone solo on "Three Views of a Secret" "yields one of the albums more inspired moments." He remarked: "Ali comes across mainly as a mentor, leading the assembled players during an early stage in their development." AAJ's Glenn Astarita described the album as "a first-rate effort and well worth investigating," and praised Ess's contribution, writing: "In some respects, this outing could conceivably appear to be the guitarist's solo album... Ess' effervescent and lyrically rich soloing endeavors provide the majority of the highlights."

== Track listing ==
1. "No One in Particular" (Greg Murphy) – 8:14
2. "Witch Hunt" (Wayne Shorter) – 8:27
3. "Blues for Annik" (Sonelius Smith) – 7:45
4. "Not Now, Later" (Gene Shimosato) – 8:19
5. "Three Views of a Secret" (Jaco Pastorius) – 9:22
6. "Dear Alice" (Ravi Coltrane) – 6:54

== Personnel ==
- Rashied Ali – drums
- Ravi Coltrane – tenor saxophone, soprano saxophone
- Gene Ess (Gene Shimosato) – guitar
- Greg Murphy – piano
- Matthew Garrison – electric bass
