= Thollem McDonas =

American singer-songwriter

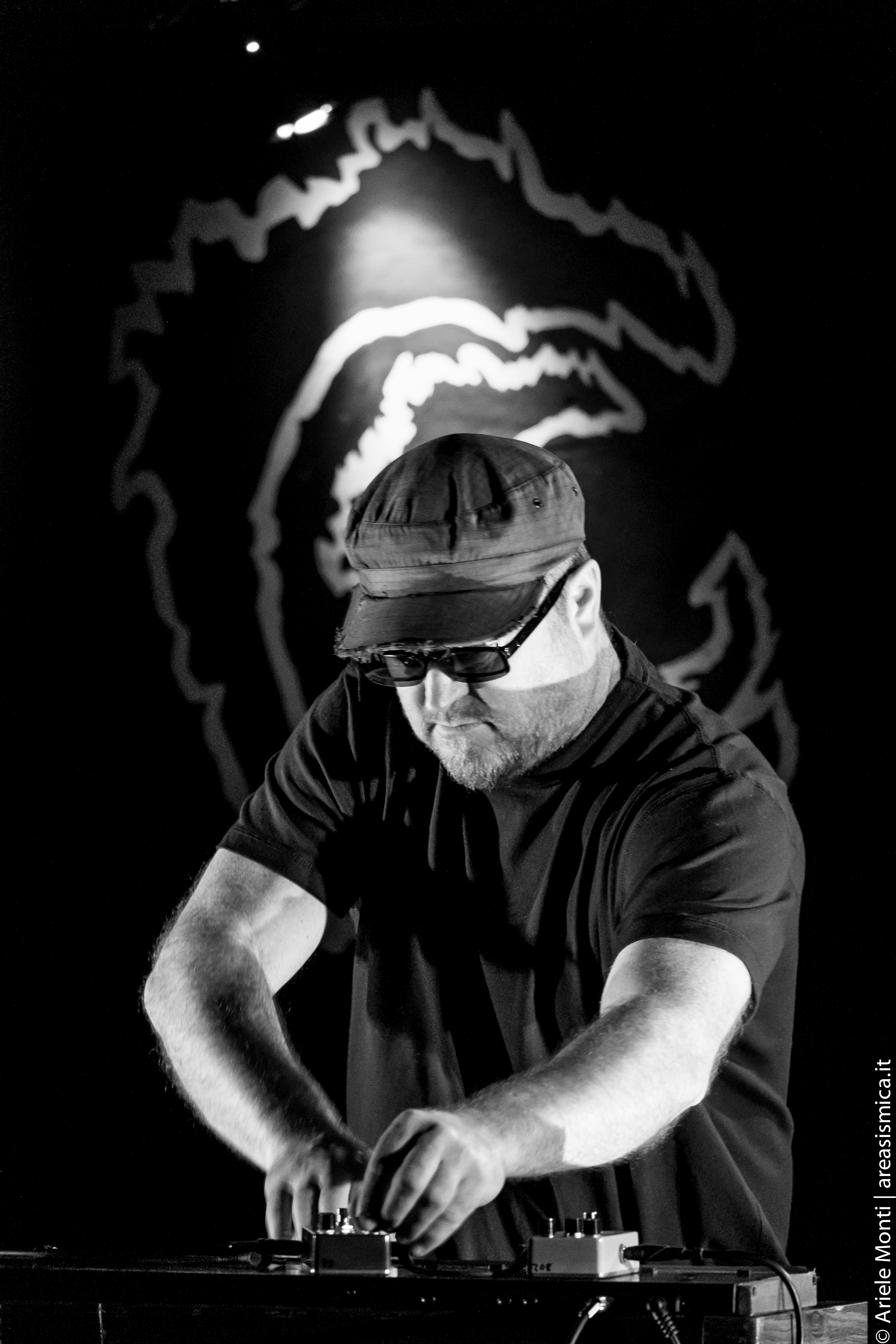
- Thollem McDonas on electric piano at Area Sismica, Italy, 2015

Background information
- Born: February 23, 1967 (age 59)
- Origin: Palo Alto, California
- Genres: Classical, avant-garde jazz, experimental, punk
- Occupations: Pianist, composer, improviser, educator
- Instrument: Piano
- Years active: 2002–present
- Labels: Porter, Leo Records, ESP-Disk
- Website: thollem.com

Thollem McDonas is an American pianist, improviser, composer, singer-songwriter, touring performer, musical educator, and social critic. His musical compositions and performances have ranged from classical, and free jazz, to experimental and punk rock. He has toured North America and Europe since 2006, performing solo works and collaborating with an array of musicians, dancers, dance companies and filmmakers.

== Origins and Musical Developments ==
McDonas began studying piano at the age of 5. His mother was a piano teacher and this led him to study the instrument. At the age of 14, he began teaching and authoring his own compositions. Shortly after McDonas graduated with degrees in piano performance and composition from San Jose State University, the Gulf War began. He abandoned the academy in his 20s to pursue direct political action. Eventually he merged these concerns, using music and performance at protests to draw attention to pertinent issues. Eventually he resumed his professional music career on [his] own terms, integrating his ... political ideologies into his compositions and performances. He is constantly in motion, playing solo concerts, concerts with various groups—both established and ad hoc—and leading workshops and clinics.

== Recording Artist ==
=== Estamos Ensemble ===
McDonas is the founding director of Estamos Ensemble, an international musical group whose purpose is to promote more dialogue and collaboration across the U.S. – Mexican border. In 2011, Edgetone Records released a double disc album by Estamos Ensemble premiering original works by William Parker, Nels Cline, Pauline Oliveros, Joan Jeanrenaud, Vinny Golia, Ana Lara, Juan Felipe Waller and Jorge Torres Sáenz.

=== Tsigoti ===
Tsigoti is Thollem McDonas’ most overtly political project. A freewheeling anarcho-punk group, Tsigoti serves as a literal mouthpiece for his activism. Thollem sings politically charged lyrics alongside his off-kilter piano playing. The group is rounded out by Italian musicians Andrea Caprara (drums), Matteo Bennici/Piero Spitilli (bass), and Jacopo Andreini (guitar).

=== Debussy Project ===
In 2008, McDonas was invited by Musee Labenche to perform works by Claude Debussy on the last piano Debussy owned. He was accompanied by world-renowned contrabassist Stefano Scodanibbio. The resulting album, OnDebussy'sPianoAnd..., was released in 2010.

=== Collaborations ===
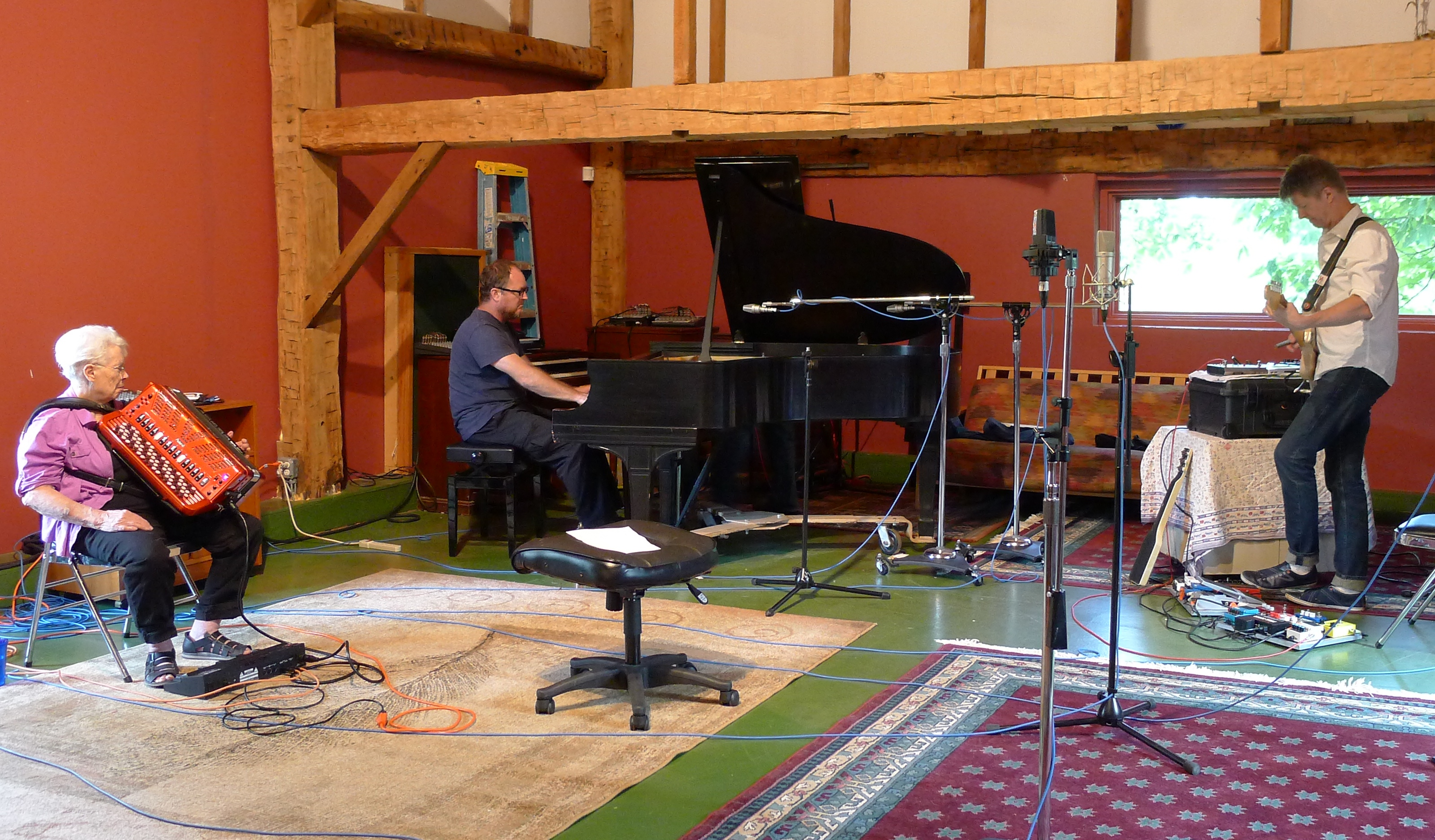
Thollem McDonas and Nels Cline recording with Pauline Oliveros recording Thollem and Cline's third album of the Thollem/Cline Trio series. Art Farm Studio in Accord, NY, August 2015

== Composer, teacher, author, actor ==
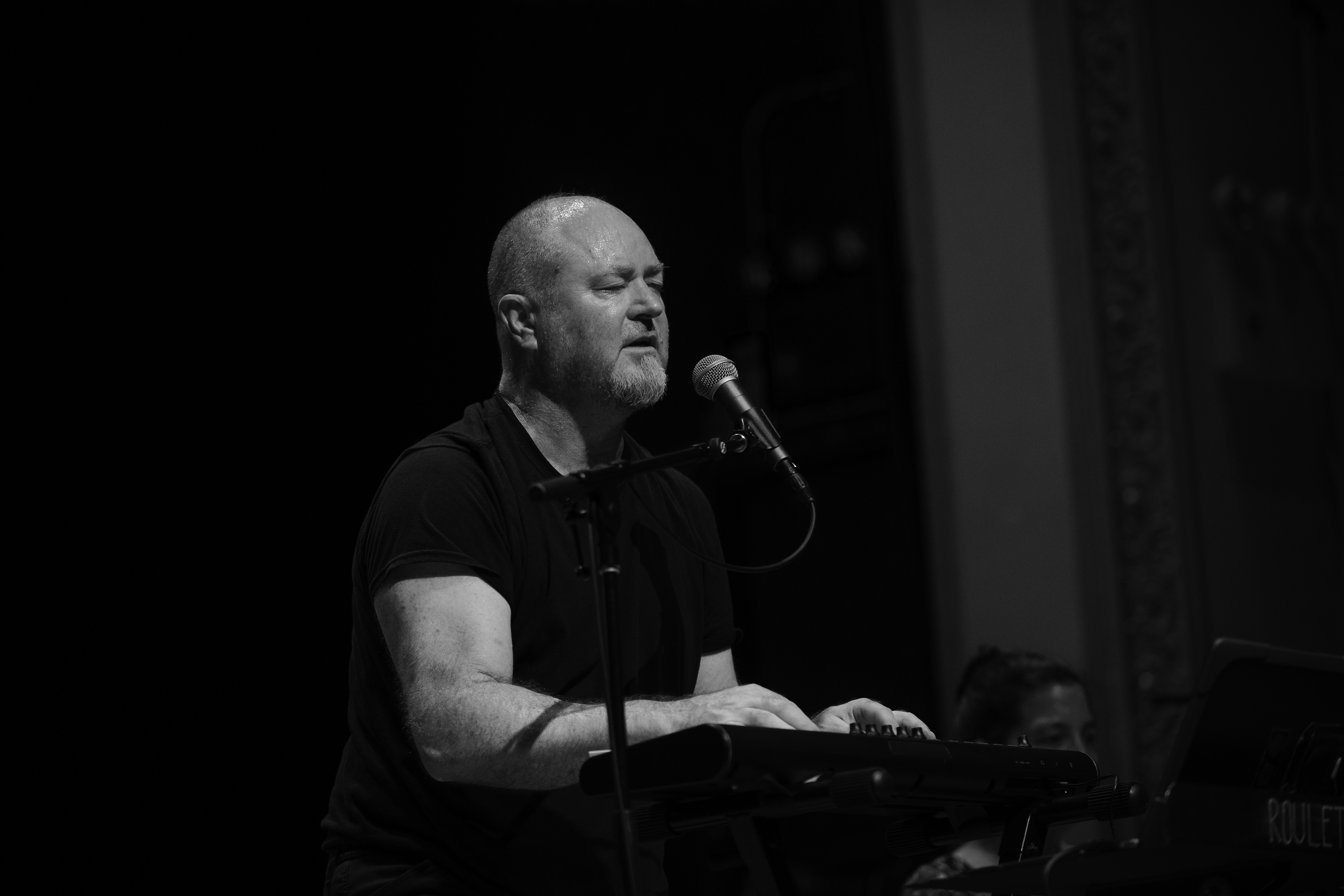
Thollem McDonas, Arts for Art - Vision Festival 2024. Photo by Marek Lazarski

As a composer, Thollem has received Meet the Composer: Creative Connections, 2007 and American Music Center: CAP (2010) 'Stirring Awake' debuted at Yerba Buena Center for the Arts (August 19, 2010) He was awarded the Mid Atlantic Arts Foundation: USArtists (2010) as director of Estamos Ensemble He is the composer for "Triumph of the Wild" (2011), a documentary short by film maker Martha Colburn.

As a teacher, Thollem tours with his project The Everywhere Quintet. The musicians involved are entirely different at each performance, and they represent countless genres or styles of playing.

As a writer, Thollem's essay "The Peripatetic Life of an Improvising Musician" was published in the Anthology of Essays on Deep Listening (Deep Listening Institute, 2012). In 2013, he was a contributor to Full Moon, a Czech music magazine, based in Prague, covering mostly – not only – independent music scene and artists pushing the boundaries of music, one way or another. He reviews music and art exhibits for First American Art Magazine, including the art show, "We Honor: The Art of Activism".

As an actor, Thollem is known for "River of Fundament" (2014), a film by Matthew Barney.

== Discography ==
=== Solo ===
- Dear Future (compilation, Wild Silence, 2013)
- Gone Beyond Reason To Find One (Edgetone Records, 2010)
- Racingthesun Chasingthesun (Creative Sources, 2008)
- Somuchheaven Somuchhell (Saravah, 2008)
- Poor Stop Killing Poor (Edgetone Records, 2007)
- Nuclearbomb Cavepainting (Pax Recordings, 2006)

=== Other Collaborations ===
- Thollem/Riley/Cline: The Light is Real (Other Minds Records, 2023)
- Thollem/Parker/Cline: Gowanus Sessions II (ESP-Disk, 2020)
- Radical Empathy Trio: Reality and Other Imaginary Places (ESP-Disk, 2019)
- Thollem/DuRoche/Stjames Trio: Live in Our Time (ESP-Disk, 2018)
- Rencontres électriques with CLSI ensemble and Yochk'o Seffer (Acel, 2016)
- Radical Empathy with Michael Wimberly and Nels Cline (Relative Pitch Records, 2015)
- Michael Snow and Thollem McDonas Two Piano Concert at the Philadelphia Museum of Art (Edgetone Records, 2014)
- The View From Up with Marco Rogliano/Francesco Dillon/Daniele Roccato (Setola Di Maiale, 2014)
- Whistling Joy Jumpers: Surprising Wooden Clocks with Jad Fair & Brian Chase (Thick Syrup Records, 2013)
- Soar Trio: Emergency Management Heist with Skeeter C.R. Shelton & Joel Peterson (Edgetone Records, 2013)
- The Gowanus Session with William Parker and Nels Cline (Porter Records, 2012)
- Polishing the Mirror Magimc Trio: Edoardo Marraffa/Stefano Giust/Thollem McDonas (Amirani Records, 2012)
- OnDebussy'sPianoAnd... with Italian contra bassist Stefano Scodanibbio (Die Schachtel, 2010)
- Noble Art with Nicola Guazzaloca (Amirani Records, 2009)
- Arrington de Dionyso: Gigantomachia – also with Gregg Skloff & John Niekrasz (ESP-Disk, 2009)
- Sono Contento Di Stare Qua with Edoardo Ricci (Edgetone Records, 2006)
- Zdrastvootie: Zdrastvootie 2 (Holy Mountain, 2005)

=== Duos With Drummers ===
- Imaginary Images with Lukas Ligeti, Drums (Leo Records, 2014)
- Trio Music Minus One Thollem Electric with Gino Robair, Drums/percussion (Setola di Maiale, 2014)
- Conformity Contortion Thollem Electric with Sara Lund, Drums (New Atlantis, 2014)
- Dub Narcotic Session with Brian Chase, Drums (New Atlantis, 2014)
- Thollem Electric's Keyngdrum Overdrive: WITH! Thollem Electric with Csaba Csendes, Dave Wayne, Raven Chacón, Lisa Schonberg, John Niekrasz, Heather Treadway, Ian Kerr, André Custodio, Miles Rozatti and Brian Chase (Union Pole, 2013)
- I'll Meet You Halfway Out In The Middle Of It All with Rick Rivera (Edgetone Records, 2006)
- Everything's Going Everywhere with Rick Rivera (Edgetone Records, 2005)

=== Estamos Ensemble ===
- People's Historia with Carmina Escobar & Milo Tamez (Relative Pitch Records, 2013)
- JimpaniKustakwaKaJankwariteecherï (Edgetone Records, 2011)

=== Tsigoti ===
- Read Between the Lines … Think Outside Them (Post-Consumer Records, 2013)
- Imagination Liberation Front Thinks Again (Post-Consumer Records, 2012)
- Private Poverty Speaks To The People Of The Party (ESP-Disk, 2010)
- TheBrutalRealityOfModernBrutality (née WarIsTerror TerrorIsWar, Edgetone Records, 2008)

=== Bad News From Houston with John Dieterich ===
- In the Valley of the Cloudbuilder (Post-Consumer Records, 2013)
- AllForNow (Dromos Records, 2010)

=== The Hand to Man Band (with Mike Watt, John Dieterich & Tim Barnes) ===
- You Are Always On Our Minds (Post-Consumer Records, 2012)

=== Bloom Project with Rent Romus ===
- Sudden Aurora (Edgetone Records, 2009)
- Prismatic Season (Edgetone Records, 2008)
- Bloom with Jon Brumit & Steven Baker (Edgetone Records, 2006)

=== 10,000 Tigers with Arrington de Dionyso ===
- Intuition, Science, And Sex (Edgetone Records, 2008)
