= Pregnant (band) =

American band from California

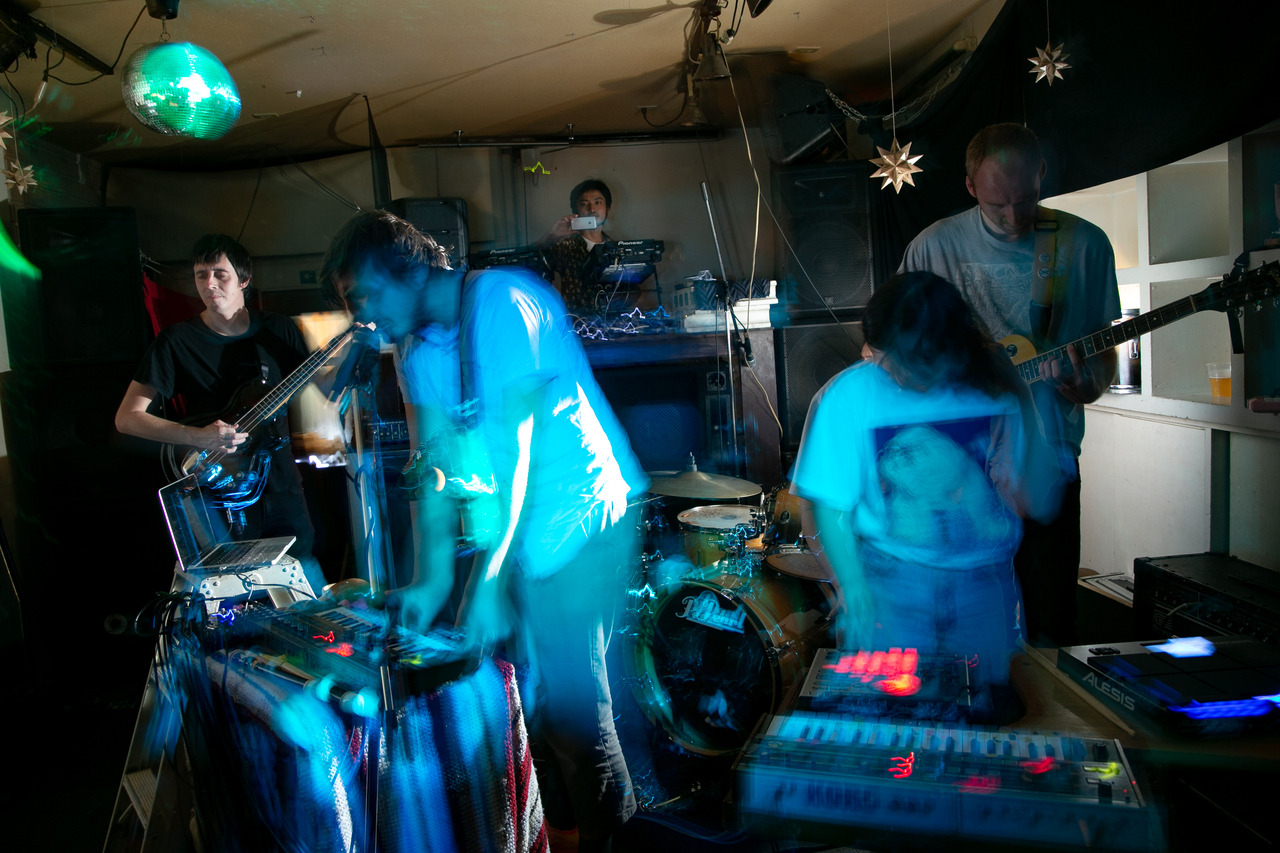
- Pregnant in Kitakyushu, Japan (2018)

Background information
- Origin: Placerville, California, U.S.
- Genres: folk, electronic, experimental
- Years active: 2008–present
- Labels: Mush Records; Porter Records
- Members: Daniel Trudeau; Luis Gutierrez; Ben Lewis
- Past members: Nick Cowman; Michael RJ Saalman; Brynley Stoner; Sean Hayashi; Styles Munson; Molly Raney; Daniel Ramirez; Matt Trudeau

Pregnant is an American musical project founded by Daniel Trudeau in Placerville, California in 2004. Their sound has been described as "mutant pop sound collages". They have released music on Porter Records and Mush Records.

== Career ==
Pregnant started as a solo project consisting only of Daniel Trudeau. The first album, Ike Wimin, was released on KDVS Recordings in 2009. Pregnant continued as a solo project for the albums Regional Music (2010) and Life Hard: I Try (2011).

For their fifth album, Pottery Mill (2013), Pregnant became a duo with the addition of Daniel's brother Matt Trudeau. The band eventually relocated to Sacramento and released several more albums with different band members, with Daniel Trudeau being the only consistent member. Their 10th album, Duct Tape (2017), was released on Plastic Response Records and features fellow Sacramento musician Mason Lindahl.

In 2014, Daniel started a project called Your Song, in which people could donate $7 or more through the band's Bandcamp page for him to write, record and release a song about them. He commissioned over 100 songs for this project, which were released as compilations through independent cassette labels.

== Albums ==
- Beautiful Moon (Lost Lamp Records, 2008)
- Ike Wimin (KDVS Recordings, 2009)
- Liquidation On Swans (Life's Blood, 2010)
- Regional Music (Life's Blood, 2010)
- Life Hard: I Try (Mush, 2011)
- Tradition (w/ Alak Porter Records, 2011)
- Pottery Mill (Mush, 2013)
- Inconvenience (Porch Party Records, 2014)
- John Raw (Crash Symbols, 2014)
- Duct Tape (Plastic Response Records, 2017)
- 100% Beef (Possible Recordworks, 2021)

== EPs ==
- Spirit Of Being (Reverb Worship, 2008)
- Akimbo (Fold, 2024)

== Cassettes ==
- Watch Over Me/El Ae (w/ Casey Chisolm, Ascension Recordings, 2013)
- Remixes 2010-2014 (Quantum Wampum, 2014)
- Your Song 1-4 (Staring at the Ceiling, 2014)
- Your Song 5 (Long Live Death Records, 2015)
- Split (w/ Poppet, KDVS Recordings, 2014)
- Made in China (Uchuu Music, 2016)
- Split (w/ Dean Circone, Hairy Spider Legs, 2016)
