= Deals, Ideas & Ideals =

Studio album by Rashied Ali, Peter Kowald, and Assif Tsahar
- Released: 2001
- Recorded: May 23 and 24, 2000
- Studio: Survival Studio, New York City
- Genre: Free jazz
- Label: Hopscotch Records; HOP 6
- Producer: Rashied Ali, Peter Kowald, Assif Tsahar

Rashied Ali chronology
Live at Tonic (2001)	Deals, Ideas & Ideals (2001)	No One in Particular (2001)

Deals, Ideas & Ideals is an album by drummer Rashied Ali, bassist Peter Kowald, and multi-reedist Assif Tsahar, who plays both saxophone and bass clarinet. It was recorded on May 23 and 24, 2000, at Survival Studio in New York City, and was released in 2001 by Hopscotch Records.

== Reception ==
Professional ratings
Review scores
Source	Rating
The Penguin Guide to Jazz	3/4 stars
The Virgin Encyclopedia of Jazz	3/5 stars

In a review for JazzTimes, Bill Milkowski called the album a "brazenly free session," noting that it "continue[s] the urgent momentum borne out of the vital ’70s loft-jazz scene," and writing: "This thunderous trio project provides clear evidence that 30-some years after his tenure with John Coltrane, Rashied Ali is still dealing in deep waters."

The authors of The Penguin Guide to Jazz Recordings described the trio as "a powerful unit," and stated: "anyone who appreciates free jazz of this vintage will enjoy the record."

Derek Taylor of All About Jazz commented: "Each man is masterfully versed in the vernacular of free jazz, but surprisingly much of the time this date has more in common sonically with Sonny Rollins' precedent setting Village Vanguard trios of 1957 than it does Ayler's Spiritual Unity... the music created is timeless, testament to the abilities of the players both as individuals and collectively."

Paris Transatlantic's Dan Warburton noted that, on the album, "Tsahar sounds like he's been dusting off his Interstellar Space chops," while Kowald's "pizzicato is velvety and rich... and his bowed work is, as ever, a wonder to behold."

Writing for New York Press, Joe S. Harrington called the group "a natural product of some basic harmony that exists among these three men," and singled out "Currents" for praise, remarking: "This trio is so damn tight on this song and others that it's no mere piece of fiction to brand them one of the best combos working today - the equal to any of the Aum Fidelity crowd. There are moments in this song that are just overwhelming in their frenetic meter, but it's not just wasted notes, it's intense and believable."

== Track listing ==
Composed by Assif Tsahar, Peter Kowald, and Rashied Ali. Track timings not provided.

1. "The Rap"
2. "Isotopes"
3. "Freedom Train"
4. "Hereafter"
5. "Currents"
6. "Deals, Ideas & Ideals"
7. "Walking Shadows"

== Personnel ==
- Assif Tsahar – tenor saxophone, bass clarinet
- Peter Kowald – bass
- Rashied Ali – drums
