= The Hand to Man Band =

American experimental music group

- Genres: Experimental music
- Years active: 2010–present
- Label: Post-Consumer Records
- Members: Thollem McDonas; Mike Watt; John Dieterich; Tim Barnes

The Hand to Man Band is an American independent experimental music group formed in 2010. Their music has been described as spanning "psychotropic jazz to konked-out funk to skronked-out dirges to alien transmissions to plaintive nocturnal pleas."

== History ==
Nicholas Taplin, owner of Post-Consumer Records, invited Thollem McDonas to Austin, Texas to record for him. McDonas invited John Dieterich to join and Dieterich himself invited Tim Barnes. McDonas then asked Mike Watt and the group began improvising. The initial plan was to perform some gigs after recording but Watt's commitments to The Stooges prevented his joining them on the road.

The album, You Are Always On Our Minds, wouldn't be released until 2012. The title came from a fortune cookie Watt once received.

== Discography ==
- You Are Always on Our Minds (2012)
