= Divine Radiance (album) =

Studio album by Tisziji Muñoz
- Released: 2003
- Recorded: October 30, 2001
- Studio: Right Track Recording, New York City
- Genre: Free jazz
- Length: 1:02:18
- Label: Anami Music; FDM 36706
- Producer: Tisziji Muñoz, Paul Shaffer

Tisziji Muñoz chronology
Shaman-Bala (2002)	Divine Radiance (2003)	Love at First Sound (2005)

Divine Radiance is an album by guitarist Tisziji Muñoz. It was recorded on October 30, 2001, at Right Track Recording in New York City, and was released in 2003 by Anami Music. On the album, Muñoz is joined by saxophonists Pharoah Sanders and Ravi Coltrane, keyboardist Paul Shaffer, bassists Cecil McBee and Don Pate, and drummer Rashied Ali. The recording is a response to the events of 9-11.

In 2003, the band recorded Divine Radiance Live!, released by Anami in 2013.

== Reception ==
Professional ratings
Review scores
Source	Rating
AllMusic	4/5 stars

In a review for AllMusic, arwulf arwulf wrote: "Muñoz alternately soothes and riles in the grand tradition of ruminative and ecstatically charged free jazz. The title track and 'Initiation by Fire' are particularly tempestuous examples of joyously improvised volcanism."

Writing for JazzTimes, Brian Gilmore called Muñoz's playing "superb," and stated: "Unlike many guitarists today, Munoz's journey and reach is beyond the music of the Americas or the world. Munoz is exploring the universe and the human spirit."

Hank Shteamer of All About Jazz described the album as "an extremely well-played... example of post-Coltrane free jazz that fans of this style will certainly enjoy."

Paris Transatlantic's Nate Dorward commented: "any disc uniting Sanders, McBee and Ali has plenty going for it, and the all-out fury of the 24-minute title-track is worth a taste if you're a fan of so-called 'ecstatic jazz'."

== Track listing ==
1. "Moment of Truth" – 1:10
2. "Visiting This Planet - Leaving This Planet" – 16:14
3. "Initiation by Fire" – 16:16
4. "Fatherhood" – 4:25
5. "Divine Radiance" – 24:11

== Personnel ==
- Tisziji Muñoz – guitar, synthesizer
- Pharoah Sanders – saxophone
- Ravi Coltrane – saxophone
- Paul Shaffer – piano, organ, synthesizer
- Cecil McBee – bass
- Don Pate – bass
- Rashied Ali – drums
