= Duo Exchange =

Studio album by Rashied Ali and Frank Lowe
- Released: 1973
- Recorded: Probably September 1972
- Studio: Marzette Watts's studio, New York City
- Genre: Free jazz
- Label: Survival Records; SR 101

Rashied Ali chronology
| Duo Exchange (1973) | Rashied Ali Quintet (1973) |

Duo Exchange is an album by drummer Rashied Ali and saxophonist Frank Lowe. It was probably recorded in September 1972 at the studio of Marzette Watts in New York City, and was issued by Ali's Survival Records in 1973 as the label's inaugural release. In 2020, Survival Records released an expanded double-CD album titled Duo Exchange: Complete Sessions featuring incomplete and alternate takes, as well as studio discussion.

== Reception ==
Professional ratings
Review scores
| Source | Rating |
|---|---|
| AllMusic; Original release | 4/5 stars |
| The Penguin Guide to Jazz; Original release | 3/4 stars |
| AllMusic; Complete Sessions | 4.5/5 stars |
| Pitchfork; Complete Sessions | 8/10 stars |
| Tom Hull – on the Web | A− |

In a review for AllMusic, Wilson McCloy wrote: "The interaction between Ali and Frank Lowe is exciting and of a consistently high level, making this recording a worthy and historical addition to the collections of all fans of avant-garde duos." In an AllMusic review of the Complete Sessions, Thom Jurek stated: "Duo Exchange... is among the most intense, canny articulations of the drums/saxophone duo ever recorded... Lowe... goes at Ali, not around or through him and, as the drummer proceeds similarly, they find bliss and terror in the eye of the sonic hurricane... The sound on this set is breathtaking... It's ferocious, aggressive, and spiritual free jazz."

Writing for Rolling Stone, Hank Shteamer compared the album to John Coltrane's Interstellar Space, which featured Ali, and commented: "There's a starkness and severity to Interstellar Space, but Duo Exchange feels looser and more conversational." He called the album "a celebration of spontaneous musical flow in the absence of a traditional jazz rhythm section with piano and bass — a dialogue between two players rooted in a common tradition but not bound by its conventions."

A. D. Amorosi, in a review of the Complete Sessions for Jazz Times, wrote: "As the louder partner in the conversation, Ali leads the way through most of Duo Exchange's wiry chatter. Make no mistake, however: Lowe... gives as good as he gets." He concluded: "The only thing more powerful than the entirety of Duo Exchange: Complete Sessions is the thought of what might have been had Lowe and Ali exchanged further thoughts."

In a review for Pitchfork, Andy Beta called the album "an incandescent session" and "one of the most caustic free jazz albums," and remarked: "For long stretches of the set, Ali and Lowe burn like a dragon dueling with a flamethrower... Amid his piercing overtones, Lowe's reed playing sometimes brings to mind Coltrane's famous 'sheets of sound,' working to exhaust every possibility in his cascading runs. He seems to reach for a pure sound beyond notes per se, reflecting the squalor of early-'70s New York through his horn. His tone is piercing, jarring, wearying, like the brakes on a train, an overheated tea kettle, a feverish baby. Ali is there with Lowe's every breath, shattering the rhythm around him and propelling him to even greater extremes."

Writing for Black World/Negro Digest, Ron Welburn stated: "What makes this 'exchange' successful is that neither musician is a second member of a group; each willfully shares and converses".

Thurston Moore included the album in his "Top Ten From The Free Jazz Underground" list, first published in 1995 in the second issue of the defunct Grand Royal Magazine, and wrote: "Duo Exchange is Rashied and Frank completely going at it and just burning notes and chords where ever they can find 'em. Totally sick."

== Track listing ==
Music by Rashied Ali and Frank Lowe.

1. "Exchange - Part 1" – 13:30
2. "Exchange - Part 2" – 15:09

== Personnel ==
- Frank Lowe – tenor saxophone, flute, percussion
- Rashied Ali – drums, percussion
