= Ascension (John Coltrane album) =

1966 studio album by John Coltrane

Studio album by John Coltrane
- Released: February 1966
- Recorded: June 28, 1965
- Studio: Van Gelder (Englewood Cliffs)
- Genres: Free jazz; avant-garde jazz
- Length: 40:49 (Edition II); 38:30 (Edition I); 79:19 (CD release)
- Label: Impulse!
- Producer: Bob Thiele

John Coltrane chronology
The John Coltrane Quartet Plays (1965)	Ascension (1966)	New Thing at Newport (1966)

Ascension is a studio album by the jazz composer and musician John Coltrane. It was released through Impulse! Records in February 1966. It is considered a watershed in Coltrane's work, with the albums recorded before it being more conventional in structure and the albums recorded after it being looser, free jazz inspired works. In addition, it signaled Coltrane's interest in moving away from the quartet format. AllMusic called it "the single recording that placed John Coltrane firmly into the avant-garde". It was recorded at the Van Gelder Studio in June 1965.

== Background ==
At the time of the Ascension recording session, Coltrane was one of the world's most successful jazz artists in both the artistic and commercial sense. His best-selling album A Love Supreme was nominated for a Grammy Award, and was voted "album of the year" by both DownBeat and Jazz magazines. In addition, Coltrane was elected to DownBeat's Hall of Fame, putting him in the company of Coleman Hawkins and Lester Young. At the same time, in the months since A Love Supreme was recorded, Coltrane's music had become increasingly turbulent, moving further in the direction of free jazz. Coltrane had befriended saxophonist Albert Ayler, and was heavily influenced by his music; meanwhile, he had also become somewhat of a father figure for a number of younger avant-garde players, some of whom would appear on Ascension. According to writer Bernard Gendron, "At the height of his career, riding on the momentum of the critical and popular triumph of A Love Supreme, Coltrane was the modern jazz star of the 1960s, with a large following of serious jazz fans and great respect from his musician peers. He was in an ideal position to bring into the orbit of the avant-garde fans and musicians who had previously hesitated, been puzzled or mildly hostile."

== Additional musicians ==
The musicians that Coltrane chose to supplement the members of the classic quartet were a mix of players ranging from established to relatively unknown, all of whom were younger than Coltrane, and many of whom had played with Coltrane in the years preceding the recording of Ascension. Trumpeter Freddie Hubbard and bassist Art Davis were well-known and well-recorded by that point, and both had recorded with Coltrane on Africa/Brass and Olé Coltrane. (Davis also appeared on The John Coltrane Quartet Plays, recorded earlier in 1965.) Saxophonist Archie Shepp recorded his first Impulse! album, Four for Trane, in 1964 after Coltrane recommended him to producer Bob Thiele, and went on to release over a dozen albums on the label. Shepp, along with Art Davis, also appeared on an alternate take of the "Acknowledgement" section of A Love Supreme, which was released more than thirty years after the appearance of the original recording. Shortly after the recording of Ascension, Shepp appeared on New Thing at Newport, a split LP with Coltrane's quartet appearing on side one and Shepp's quartet on side two.

Shepp also introduced Coltrane to saxophonist Marion Brown, and Coltrane soon used his influence at Impulse! to help Brown secure the recording date for Three for Shepp. Saxophonist John Tchicai had previously recorded with Shepp as part of the New York Contemporary Five and on Four for Trane, and also sat in with Coltrane during one or more performances at the Half Note. Trumpeter Dewey Johnson had played with Marion Brown and repeatedly sat in with Coltrane's group before being asked to participate in the recording of Ascension. Saxophonist Pharoah Sanders had performed with Sun Ra, whose music Coltrane admired, and had also played and practiced yogic breathing exercises with Marion Brown. In 1964, Coltrane invited Sanders to sit in with his group after hearing his debut recording on the ESP label and attending a concert by Sanders's band, which featured John Hicks, Wilbur Ware, and Billy Higgins, at the Village Gate. (Ware and Higgins had both previously recorded with Coltrane.) Sanders was invited to join Coltrane's band in September 1965 and went on to play and record on many of Coltrane's later recordings.

In addition, drummer Rashied Ali, who would eventually join Coltrane's group, was invited to participate in the recording of Ascension, but passed up the opportunity, a decision he would soon come to regret. Saxophonist Frank Wright was also invited, but reportedly felt that his skills were not up to the demands of the music.

== Recording session ==
The recording took place, unrehearsed, at Van Gelder Studio in Englewood Cliffs, New Jersey, on June 28, 1965. At the start of the session, Coltrane handed out lead sheets. According to Archie Shepp, "The ensemble passages were based on chords, but these chords were optional... In the solo plus quartet parts there are no specified chords. These sections were to be dialogues between the soloists and the rhythm section." Marion Brown added: "Trane had obviously thought a lot about what he wanted to do, but he wrote most of it out in the studio. Then he told everybody what he wanted: He played this line and he said that everybody would play that line in the ensembles. Then he said he wanted crescendi and decrescendi after every solo. We ran through some things together, until we were together, and then we got into it."

The group recorded two takes of roughly equal duration. These would become known as Edition I and Edition II. At the end of the second take, Elvin Jones "flung his snare at the studio wall, signaling his decision that for him, the date was over." Marion Brown was more enthusiastic; later he described the session as "wildly exciting", the kind of record "you could use... to heat up the apartment on those cold winter days," and stated that both takes "had that kind of thing in them that makes people scream. The people who were in the studio were screaming. I don't know how the engineers kept the screams out of the record." John Tchicai recalled: "It was a feast, incomparable. On the day of the recording, ecstasy and excitement were the prime movers. All of us did our very best to contribute and to carry out the few instructions the Master had given us. It was very African! Our Ancestors were definitely among us more than usual!"

Coltrane later stated that, during the session, "I was so doggone busy; I was worried to death... I couldn't really enjoy the [recording] date. If it hadn't been a date, then I would have really enjoyed it." At some point, he called Albert Ayler and explained: "I recorded an album and found that I was playing just like you", to which Ayler replied: "No, man, don't you see, you were playing like yourself. You were just feeling what I feel and were just crying out for spiritual unity."

On July 28, 1965, Coltrane and his quartet performed a version of Ascension on a concert at the Salle Pleyel in Paris. A recording of the performance appears on Live in Paris, incorrectly titled "Blue Valse".

== Music ==
Coltrane described Ascension in a radio interview as a "big band thing", although it resembles no big band recording made before it. The most obvious antecedent is Ornette Coleman's octet (or "double quartet") recording, Free Jazz: A Collective Improvisation, which—like Ascension—is a continuous 40-minute performance with ensemble passages and without breaks. However, on Ascension (and unlike on Free Jazz), ensemble sections alternate with solos, which take up about equal space. According to Shepp, "Free Jazz created a new form, and Ascension is a further step in the development of that form." Shepp also noted the influence of Sun Ra and Cecil Taylor on the recording, and concluded: "The precedent for what John did here goes all the way back to New Orleans... This is like a New Orleans concept, but with 1965 people". (Sun Ra's influence on Ascension was also suggested by Coltrane biographer J. C. Thomas, and by Val Wilmer, who pointed out that Coltrane was exposed to Sun Ra's music through his friendship with John Gilmore.)

Structurally, Ascension is organized around a succession of modes that serve as starting points for the musicians. Ekkehard Jost identified three modes: B♭ Aeolian, D Phrygian, and F Phrygian, while David Such added a fourth, G♭ Lydian. Changes of mode were signalled by Coltrane, Hubbard, and Tyner. The melodic germ of Ascension is a short motif that resembles the main theme of A Love Supreme's "Acknowledgment" section; however, this motif is secondary in importance to the presence of descending lines that serve to define and articulate the modes. Jost noted that, in contrast with Free Jazz, "the central idea is not to produce a network of interwoven independent melodic lines, but dense sound complexes." He explained: "a large number of rhythmically independent lines are set against one another by seven wind instruments, with the resultant overlappings. This superimposition produces rapidly moving sound-fields whose rhythmic differentiation is provided as a rule by the rhythm section, rather than coming from within. When seven independent melodic-rhythmic lines coincide, the relationships between them lose clarity, fusing into a field of sound enlivened by irregular accentuations." Jost summarized this as follows: "A new type of group improvisation emerges in which melodic-motivic evolution gives way to the moulding of a total sound.… the macro-structures of the total sound are more important than the micro-structure of the parts." Similarly, Such wrote: "The overall texture in the collectively improvised sections of Ascension is extremely dense. As a result, the listener has difficulty separating the individual lines of the seven improvisers. In comparison, the three lead soloists in Coleman's Free Jazz remain distinguishable." Shepp's comments are in agreement: "The emphasis was on textures rather than the making of an organizational entity. There was unity, but it was a unity of sounds and textures rather than like an ABA approach. You can hear...a reaching for sound and an exploration of the possibilities of sound." Ben Ratliff called Ascension "the first major piece of work from the jazz avant-garde to valorize the idea not only of sheer volume but of texture in jazz-group interaction", and noted that "immediately thereafter, the idea of texture would become very basic to experimental jazz."

With regard to the solo sections, Jost also differentiated between players like Tchicai, who tended to organize their solos motivically, as opposed to "sound" players like Sanders and Shepp, who tended to use extended techniques in an expressive way. According to Jost, Coltrane's solo is a synthesis of the two approaches: "Into a context that is melodic-motivic, all possibilities of tone coloration are incorporated, partly as a constructive device—when they serve as a means of formal articulation—and partly to provide for emotional intensification".

Shepp pointed out that Coltrane "didn't want any stars on this record" and noted that "he took no more solo time than anybody else". Such also commented that "the roles among performers in Ascension are minimally differentiated", and wrote that this approach "enables soloists and improvisers to fuse their emotions and personalities more effectively". Similarly, writer Tony Whyton stated that "Although this type of nonhierarchical experiment is typical of several collective practices in the 1960s, the role that Coltrane fulfils within the sound world of Ascension is diametrically opposed to canonical aesthetics, where the iconic genius is presented as the center of creativity and performance practice," and noted that "Coltrane's involvement in the creation of an ensemble sound is somewhat antithetical to the album's cover design, which shows the artist seated alone in quiet contemplation". Ben Ratliff wrote that the album suggested "the notion of the jazz band as community, a collective effort to make large-scale textural music rather than an exclusive, carefully structured machine", and offered these comments: "Within the individual group, the leader-with-sidemen idea seemed suddenly old; a freer and more simultaneous notion of group playing was moving in. Jazz had never been less hierarchical. The spirit of musicians' collectives was making obsolete the old story of band-versus-band competition... If there is any truth to the rumors that Coltrane was taking acid between '64 and '67, it would only amount to more similar evidence. LSD commonly encourages the user to see the ideal of life as cooperative and nonhierarchical."

== Reaction ==
Professional ratings
Review scores
Source	Rating
AllMusic	5/5 stars
DownBeat	5/5 stars
The Rolling Stone Album Guide	5/5 stars
The Rolling Stone Jazz Record Guide	4/5 stars
The Penguin Guide to Jazz	(crown)
The Encyclopedia of Popular Music	4/5 stars

Reaction to Ascension was swift and generally intense. ABC executive Alan Bergman recalled receiving an advance copy of the album prior to its release; he stated: "I listened to about five minutes... I walked into Bob Thiele's office and I can see myself holding this thing up with my mouth open. He says, 'I know, I know'... He says, 'It's going to be a classic!'" Since its release, the album has been portrayed as a turning point in the history of jazz. According to Dave Liebman, the album "blew everybody out of the water", and was "the torch that lit the free-jazz thing. I mean, it really begins with Cecil [Taylor] and Ornette [Coleman] in '59, but Ascension was like the patron saint saying, 'It's OK—this is valid.' I think that even had much more of an effect on everybody than A Love Supreme." George Russell stated that the recording of Ascension was "when Coltrane turned his back on the money." Coltrane biographer Eric Nisenson wrote that the album "signaled Coltrane's full embrace of the New Thing and its players", and that, with the album, "he finally became a full-fledged member of the free jazz avant-garde, with no turning back."

A review by Wilfrid Mellers shortly after the album's release called the album "the most impressive example of 'free jazz' that has come my way. Its relationship both to jazz tradition and also to developments in avant-garde music from Varèse to Cage's wilder disciples is clear..." In a review for DownBeat, Bill Mathieu called Ascension "possibly the most powerful human sound ever recorded".

Others were less positive. Saxophonist Frank Foster stated: "The main complaint came after the album Ascension. That was the turning point for some musicians who had been Coltrane enthusiasts up to that time; after that they turned off. I thought it was a little extreme, but he was always my man." Violinist Leroy Jenkins recalled having heard Coltrane's group at around the time Ascension was recorded, and recalled: "They were playing this music, screaming and ranting and raving, and, Lord - I was so drug. I said 'What?'... I dug Coltrane but I didn't know what was happening." Audiences began walking out of his concerts, as they did in August 1965, at Soldier Field in Chicago following the album's recording but prior to its release.

More recent reviews have been positive overall. In 1998, Gary Giddins wrote: "After nearly thirty-five years, it is still impossible to speak of Ascension without a word of caution. It is the single most vexatious work in jazz history. So, a word of caution: It can't hurt you. In fact, contrary to its reputation as the apogee in '60s free-jazz rants, the piece goes down as smooth as bourbon, at least after you've heard it a few times and can no longer be intimidated by its shock tactics... Coming to the end of the music's long night, you may blink at the silence in stunned relief and inscrutable rapture. Or you may not. In any case, return visits to Ascension reveal it as decreasingly monolithic. Fake notes—cackles and hollers and shrieks and squawks—are still notes, and fortuitous harmonies and melodies, forged in the cauldron of chance, will on repeated exposure seem as preordained as composed music." In a review for AllMusic, Sam Samuelson awarded the album five stars, and wrote: "this can be a difficult listen at first, but with a patient ear and an appreciation for the finer things in life, the reward is a greater understanding of the personal path that the artist was on at that particular time in his development."

Writing for All About Jazz, Derek Taylor admitted that his initial encounters with Ascension were difficult, but "like anything worth investigating the logic and effulgence of this work eventually started to reveal itself with repeated listenings. In the intervening years the elements I first mistook for anger and discord have exposed themselves as those of spirituality and unification. This is music that emancipates both players and listeners- it challenges at the same time it educates." Chris Baber, in a review for Jazz Views, called the album "one of the most significant recordings in the canon of what people might call 'free-jazz'", and wrote: "it begins by shaking any preconceptions from you and pinning you back so that you are ready to follow the logic and coherence of the piece as it unfolds. After a total immersion in the piece, you emerge, perhaps cleansed, perhaps relaxed, but definitely changed to the way you were before the piece began." He concluded: "there is a strong case to be made that Ascension is Coltrane’s best, most coherent and clearest statement of what he felt music should be for and what it could achieve." The authors of the Penguin Jazz Guide wrote: "There is nothing else like Ascension in Coltrane's work; indeed, there is nothing quite like Ascension in the history of jazz... It is a work that synthesizes the rules of classic jazz with the freedoms of the New Thing. Its success is difficult to gauge; its impact is total, overwhelming. Only slowly has it been recognized, not just as an iconic record, but a great composition." Regarding the two Editions, they commented: "After a time, they resemble a rock formation seen from a subtly different angle, but still unmistakably the same grand and forbidding outcrop."

== Influence and legacy ==
A number of younger musicians found inspiration in Ascension. Peter Brötzmann's Machine Gun, recorded in 1968, was heavily influenced by the album. Glenn Branca intended his 1981 album The Ascension to be a continuation of Coltrane's album, as well as Olivier Messiaen's L'ascension. The music produced by the members of the Association for the Advancement of Creative Musicians was frequently the result of an emphasis on a collective approach to the creation of unique textures, often using non-traditional instruments. The Rova Saxophone Quartet has repeatedly explored Ascension, recording interpretations of the work on John Coltrane's Ascension (Black Saint, 1997), Electric Ascension (Atavistic, 2005), and Rova Channeling Coltrane Electric Ascension (RogueArt, 2016). In 2007, 2008, 2010, and 2012, saxophonist Jeremy Strachan organized performances of the work, and documented the experience in an essay. In 2018, the new music group wild Up presented a concert titled "Of Ascension" featuring a set of compositions inspired by Ascension.

During their 1985 United States tour, the band Minutemen played a tape of Ascension in its entirety for their audiences prior to their live sets.

== Track listing / order of soloists and ensembles ==
Two takes were made of "Ascension" during the recording session on June 28, 1965. The second take was released on the album that is now known as Ascension (Edition I). Some months after its release, Coltrane expressed a preference for the first take, so Ascension (Edition II) was created using the first take. Impulse! used the same artwork and catalog number A-95 for both editions, but inscribed "EDITION II" on the vinyl runout circle of that edition.

Both editions are available on the single-CD version released by Impulse!/Verve/Universal in 2000, and were previously available on the 1992 double-disc collection The Major Works of John Coltrane on Impulse!/GRP/MCA.

The solo order differs slightly between the takes; Elvin Jones does not solo in Edition II.

Ascension (Edition II) (John Coltrane)

1. (Opening ensemble)
2. Coltrane solo (3:10–5:48)
3. (Ensemble)
4. Johnson solo (7:45–9:30)
5. (Ensemble)
6. Sanders solo (11:55–14:25)
7. (Ensemble)
8. Hubbard solo (14:40–17:40)
9. (Ensemble)
10. Tchicai solo (18:50–20:00)
11. (Ensemble)
12. Shepp solo (21:10–24:10)
13. (Ensemble)
14. Brown solo (25:10–27:16)
15. (Ensemble)
16. Tyner solo (29:55–33:26)
17. Davis and Garrison duet (33:26–35:50)
18. (Concluding ensemble)

Ascension (Edition I) (Coltrane)

1. (Opening ensemble)
2. Coltrane solo (4:05–6:05)
3. (Ensemble)
4. Johnson solo (7:58–10:07)
5. (Ensemble)
6. Sanders solo (11:15–13:30)
7. (Ensemble)
8. Hubbard solo (15:53–17:50)
9. (Ensemble)
10. Shepp solo (18:55–21:40)
11. (Ensemble)
12. Tchicai solo (23:11–24:56)
13. (Ensemble)
14. Brown solo (26:23–28:31)
15. (Ensemble)
16. Tyner solo (29:39–31:36)
17. Davis and Garrison duet (31:36–33:30)
18. Jones solo (33:30–33:55)
19. (Concluding ensemble)

== Personnel ==
- Freddie Hubbard – trumpet
- Dewey Johnson – trumpet
- Marion Brown – alto saxophone
- John Tchicai – alto saxophone
- John Coltrane – tenor saxophone
- Pharoah Sanders – tenor saxophone
- Archie Shepp – tenor saxophone
- McCoy Tyner – piano
- Art Davis – bass
- Jimmy Garrison – bass
- Elvin Jones – drums

== Charts ==
=== Weekly charts ===
Chart performance for Ascension
Chart (2014)	Peak position
UK Jazz & Blues Albums (Official Charts)	25

Chart (2026)	Peak position
US Top Jazz Albums (Billboard)	25

=== Monthly charts ===
Monthly chart performance for Ascension
Chart (2026)	Peak position
German Jazz Albums (Offizielle Top 100)	16
