= The Dynamic Duo Remember Trane and Bird =

Live album by Rashied Ali and Arthur Rhames
- Released: 2004
- Recorded: August 29, 1981
- Venue: Willisau Jazz Festival, Willisau, Switzerland
- Genre: Free jazz
- Length: 2:04:25
- Label: Ayler Records aylCD-050/051
- Producer: Jan Ström

Rashied Ali chronology
No One in Particular (2001)	The Dynamic Duo Remember Trane and Bird (2004)	Judgment Day Vol. 1 (2006)

The Dynamic Duo Remember Trane and Bird is a double-CD live album by drummer Rashied Ali and multi-instrumentalist Arthur Rhames. It was recorded on August 29, 1981, at the Willisau Jazz Festival in Willisau, Switzerland, and was released in 2004 by Ayler Records. Rhames, who is heard on tenor saxophone and piano, appeared on only a handful of albums during his career, and died in 1989 at the age of 32.

== Reception ==
Professional ratings
Review scores
Source	Rating
The Penguin Guide to Jazz	3/4 stars
Tom Hull – on the Web	B+

The authors of The Penguin Guide to Jazz Recordings stated that the duos "are not so much in the manner of Interstellar Space, as an attempt to capture something of the spirit of the classic [Coltrane] quartet," and noted: "Perhaps most significant for its valuable glimpse of a lost genius – if the Trane catalogue is now almost meaninglessly bloated, while Rhames's is vanishingly small – there's some great Ali here as well."

Andrey Henkin of All About Jazz wrote: "The medley style of the set makes one marvel not only at Rhames' remarkable facility and tone, even at high speeds, but at both musicians' stamina. Even the slower numbers do not lack for vitality, the duo format leaving no room to hide behind lush chords."

One Final Note's Derek Taylor commented: "Rhames wears his affinity for Coltrane prominently throughout the program. There are numerous points where he seems to channel the saxophone saint in wholesale fashion... But unlike the legion of imitators that have milked the master's memory to point of rote adoration, Rhames appears intent on infusing his own sound into what on the surface feels like heavy homage."

Critic Tom Hull remarked: "John Coltrane died too soon for Ali, the drummer who opened up the final chapter of the Saint's life; Rhames died too soon also, which is one reason you've never heard of the nonpareil street musician, but not before shaking the rafters on these previously unheard tapes."

Writing for Paris Transatlantic, Dan Warburton stated that the album "has all the fire of a revival meeting," and noted that Rhames "plays the hell out of the piano, managing to reference all of Coltrane's major pianists from Tommy Flanagan to McCoy Tyner to Alice Coltrane."

== Track listing ==
Disc 1

1. "Introduction By Rashied Ali" – 16:43
2. "Mr. P.C." (John Coltrane) – 23:19
3. "I Want To Talk About You" (Billy Eckstine) – 6:00
4. "Giant Steps" (John Coltrane) / "Impressions" (John Coltrane) / "Tune Up" (Miles Davis) – 16:06
5. "Extra, Extra - Read All About It (1)" (Rashied Ali, Arthur Rhames) – 9:59

Disc 2

1. "Giant Steps" (John Coltrane) / "Lazy Bird" (John Coltrane) / "Moment's Notice" (John Coltrane) – 7:16
2. "Extra, Extra - Read All About It (2)" (Rashied Ali, Arthur Rhames) – 7:50
3. "Acknowledgement" (John Coltrane) – 2:47
4. "Resolution" (John Coltrane) – 2:40
5. "Pursuance" (John Coltrane) – 6:28
6. "Homage to Charlie Parker - Medley" (Rashied Ali, Arthur Rhames) – 10:11
7. "The Work of the Master" (Rashied Ali, Arthur Rhames) – 14:59

== Personnel ==
- Rashied Ali – drums, vocals
- Arthur Rhames – tenor saxophone, piano
