= First Time Out: Live at Slugs 1967 =

Live album by Rashied Ali Quintet
- Released: 2020
- Recorded: May 1967
- Venue: Slugs' Saloon, New York City
- Genre: Free jazz
- Label: Survival Records; SR 551
- Producer: Ben Young, George Schuller, Patricia Ali

Rashied Ali chronology
Spirits Aloft (2010)	First Time Out: Live at Slugs 1967 (2020)

First Time Out: Live at Slugs 1967 is a live album by the Rashied Ali Quintet, led by drummer Ali, and featuring saxophonist Ramon Morris, trumpeter Dewey Johnson, pianist Stanley Cowell, and bassist Reggie Johnson. It was recorded during May 1967 at Slugs' Saloon in New York City, and was released in digital format and as a double-LP set in 2020 by Ali's label, Survival Records. The album was issued as part of an ongoing effort, led by Ali's widow Patricia, to catalogue the contents of the drummer's recording library.

== Reception ==
Professional ratings
Review scores
Source	Rating
Pitchfork	8/10 stars
The Free Jazz Collective	4/5 stars
The Vinyl District	A−
Tom Hull – on the Web	B+

In a review for Pitchfork, Andy Beta called the album "a fascinating snapshot of what turned out to be an idyllic moment in jazz history," and wrote: "If you're familiar with Ali in the context of iconoclastic giants like Coltrane or Keiji Haino, hearing him in a more relaxed and supportive role on Live at Slugs is startling. His cymbal work skitters and creates waves around the tunes, and he lays back frequently."

The Free Jazz Collective's Martin Schray stated: "this recording gives us a great impression of what live gigs at that time sounded like... with all the turmoil and chaos from those turbulent times. It is a piece of contemporary East Village jazz history."

Alex W. Rodríguez of DownBeat commented: "The bandleader's drum solos are absolutely gripping throughout; each time his number is called, he shifts effortlessly from an energetic accompanist into a sharp, dynamic tone poet... The purposeful and heartfelt quality that the ensemble conveys is a striking testament to the generative edge that can result from the right combination of open-eared musicians and loose, spacious compositions."

Writing for The New York City Jazz Record, Duck Baker remarked: "The historical value of this release is enormous... First Time Out is easy to recommend to serious free jazz fans, especially those who are focused on Ali or the two Johnsons."

In an article for The Vinyl District, Joseph Neff stated that the album "opens up a doorway into the sort of day-to-day activity that transpired in between the epochal events and cornerstone recordings which form the history of the avant-garde jazz movement," and noted: "the occasional roughness... of the recording... formulates a verité quality that as the four sides progress evinces a particular appeal."

Bret Saunders of The Denver Post called the album "beautifully realized" and "intense," with tracks that "leap off of the turntable with bracing, revolutionary energy."

== Track listing ==
Composed by Rashied Ali.

1. "Composition 1 (Title Unknown)" – 24:16
2. "Ballade" – 25:05
3. "Study for As-Salaam Alikum" – 25:12
4. "Composition 2 (Title Unknown)" – 22:23

== Personnel ==
- Rashied Ali – drums
- Ramon Morris – tenor saxophone
- Dewey Johnson – trumpet
- Stanley Cowell – piano
- Reggie Johnson – bass
