= Live at Tonic (Rashied Ali, Louis Belogenis, and Wilber Morris album) =

Live album by Rashied Ali, Louis Belogenis, and Wilber Morris
- Released: 2001
- Recorded: January 6, 2001
- Venue: Tonic, New York City
- Genre: Free jazz
- Length: 1:12:23
- Label: DIW; DIW-940

Rashied Ali chronology
| Decided... Already the Motionless Heart of Tranquility, Tangling the Prayer Called "I" (1999) | Live at Tonic (2001) | Deals, Ideas & Ideals (2001) |

Live at Tonic is a live album by drummer Rashied Ali, saxophonist Louis Belogenis, and bassist Wilber Morris. It was recorded on January 6, 2001, at Tonic in New York City, and was released later that year by DIW Records.

== Reception ==
Professional ratings
Review scores
| Source | Rating |
|---|---|
| AllMusic | 3/5 stars |
| The Penguin Guide to Jazz | 3/4 stars |
| The Encyclopedia of Popular Music | 3/5 stars |

The authors of The Penguin Guide to Jazz Recordings wrote: "Ali is boilingly intense throughout and Belogenis gives his usual convincing performance," and singled out "Heavenly Star" for praise.

Mark Corroto of All About Jazz noted that "the first track 'Invocation: Trane Is in the House'... just about describes it all," and stated that "The beauty of this session is the equal balance between these three."

A writer for the Downtown Music Gallery Newsletter called the trio "outstanding" and the music "inspired," and commented: "John Coltrane continues to inspire this trio as they spin their web of swirling and overflowing sheets of sound. They spiral together as one solid force - a perfect triangle in which each side is of equal importance."

== Track listing ==
1. "Invocation: Trane Is in the House" (Louis Belogenis) – 15:57
2. "Elixir" (Rashied Ali / Louis Belogenis / Wilber Morris) – 9:55
3. "Red Shifting" (Rashied Ali / Louis Belogenis / Wilber Morris) – 10:50
4. "Norfolk Street Run Down" (Rashied Ali / Louis Belogenis / Wilber Morris) – 13:48
5. "Heavenly Star (Dedicated to Albert Ayler)" (Louis Belogenis) – 7:21
6. "Brazilia" (John Coltrane) – 10:39
7. "Spiritual" (John Coltrane) – 3:53

== Personnel ==
- Rashied Ali – drums
- Louie Belogenis – tenor saxophone, soprano saxophone
- Wilber Morris – bass
