= Mason Lindahl =

Mason lindahl
- Genres: folk, instrumental
- Occupation(s): Musician, guitarist, songwriter
- Years active: 2005–present
- Labels: Mt. Brings Death; Tompkins Square; Lifes Blood; Porter Records; Para-Sight Records

Mason Lindahl is a guitarist and songwriter from Sacramento, California, United States.

Prominently known for his unique fingerstyle guitar playing. Mason has been compared to guitarists and songwriters such as John Fahey, Leonard Cohen and James Blackshaw. With music released on Porter Records, Para-Sight Records and Lifes Blood recordings.

== Discography ==
=== Albums ===
- Everyone's Anywhere But Home (2005)
- Serrated Man sound (2009)
- Kissing Rosy in the Rain (2021)

=== Collaboration ===
- slow sun stops (2022) with Angel Deradoorian

=== Split releases ===
- Sacramento Split 2x7" (2010) split with Ellie Fortune, Raleigh Moncrief and Zach Hill
