= Tisziji Muñoz =

American jazz guitarist

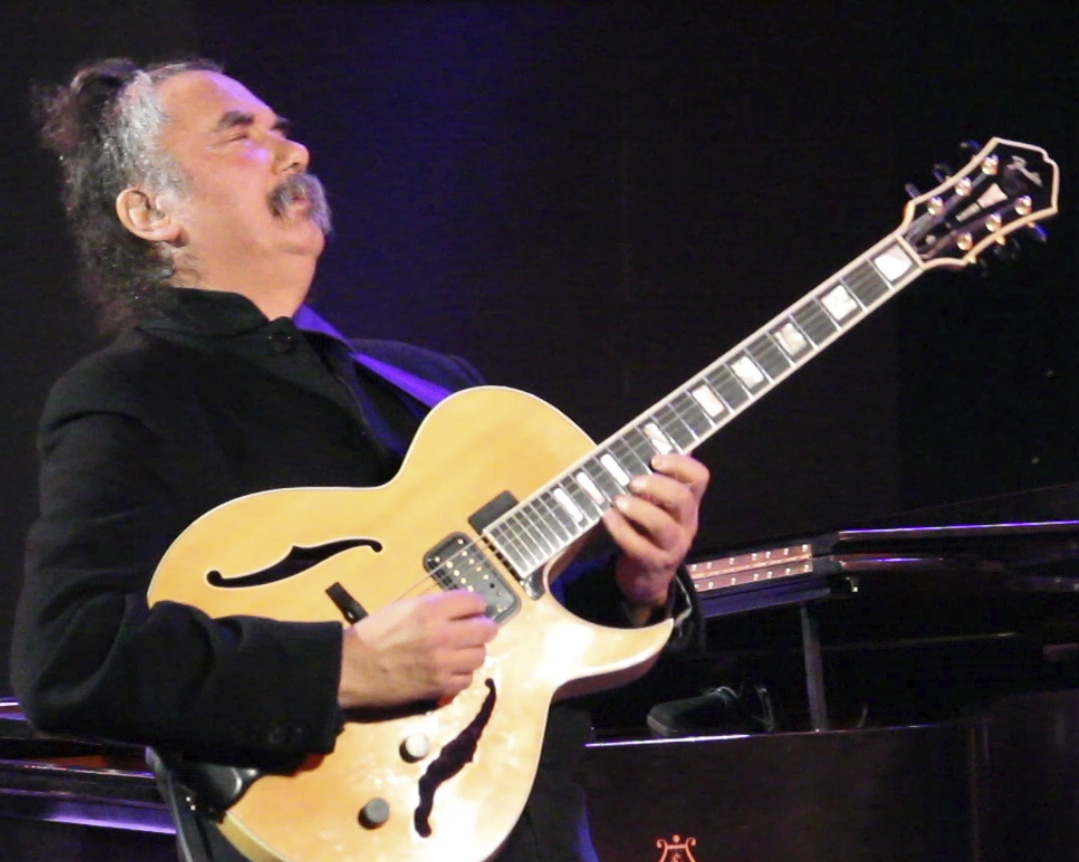
- Tisziji Muñoz performing at Dizzy's Club - Jazz at Lincoln Center, 2011

Background information
- Born: July 15, 1946 (age 80); Brooklyn, New York, United States
- Genre: Jazz
- Occupations: Musician, composer, producer, author, astrologer
- Instrument: Guitar
- Years active: 1968–present
- Label: Anami Music
- Website: tisziji.com

Tisziji Muñoz (born on July 15, 1946) is an American jazz guitarist.

He served as drummer in the 440th U.S. Army band. He left the US Army in 1969. In the 1970s, he lived in Canada and New York City. He played in Pharoah Sanders' band. In 1978, he recorded his first album, on the India Navigation label: Rendezvous with Now. In 1984, he moved to Schenectady. He plays in the Tisziji Muñoz Quartet with other jazz musicians, including the Late Show with David Letterman musical director Paul Shaffer. Along with other musicians, he performed at the 150th anniversary of the Steinway & Sons piano company, at Carnegie Hall, in 2003.

He uses a single-line playing style, due to a childhood wrist injury.

Shaffer, in his autobiography We'll Be Here For the Rest of Our Lives, describes Muñoz as a mentor and inspiration for his musical career.

== Discography ==
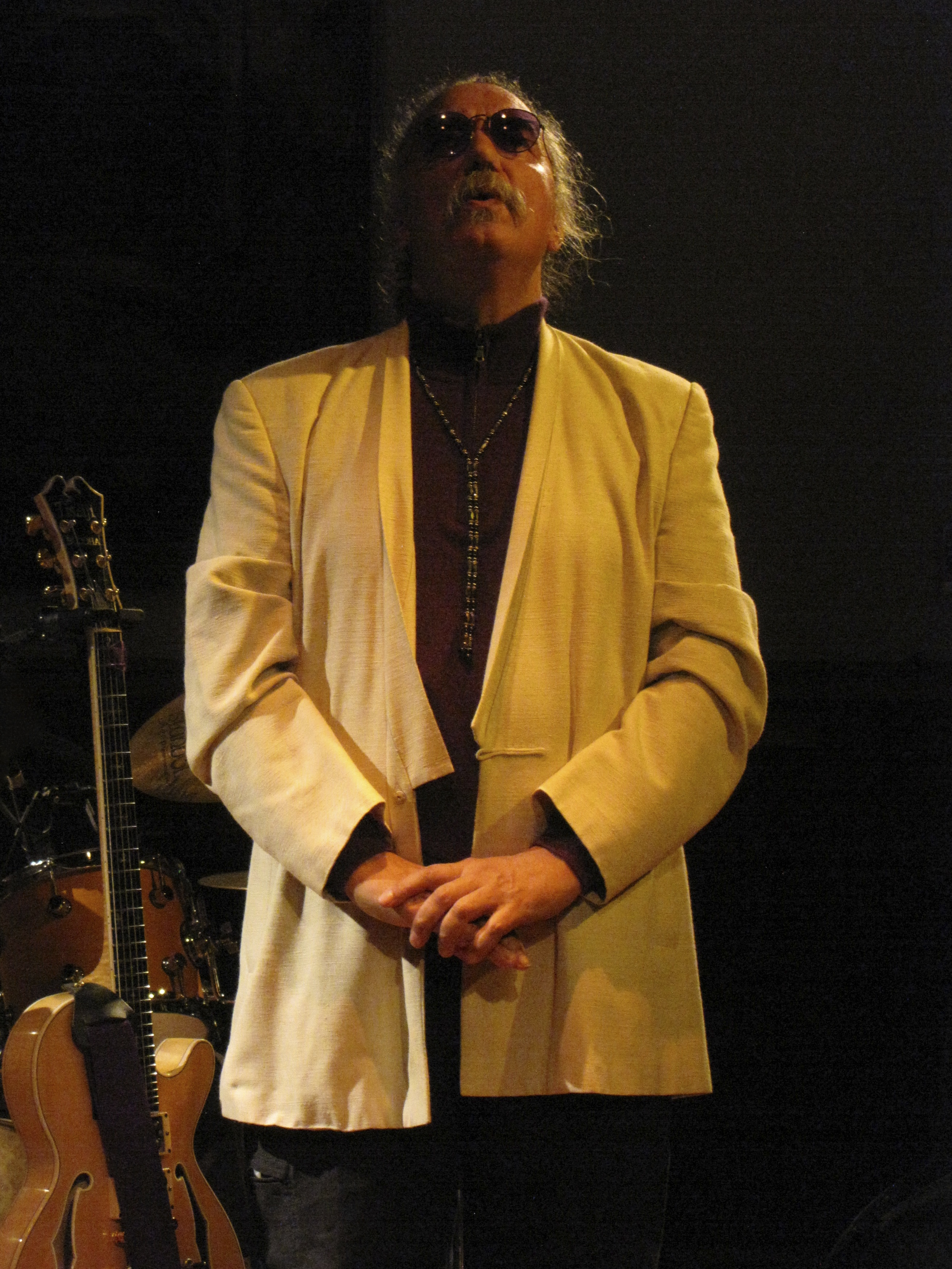
Tisziji Munoz, 2014

- Rendezvous With Now (India Navigation, 1978)
- Visiting This Planet (Anami, 1988)
- Hearing Voices (Anami, 1989)
- Heart-Sound (Anami, 1995)
- Spirit Man (Anami, 1995)
- Death Is A Friend Of Mine (Anami, 1996)
- River Of Blood (Anami, 1997)
- Present Without A Trace (Anami, 1997)
- Spirit World featuring Pharoah Sanders (Anami, 1997)
- Love Everlasting with Bob Moses (Amulet, 1999)
- Alpha Nebula: The Prophecies (Anami, 1997)
- Great Sacrifice (Maha-Yajna) (Anami, 1999)
- Presence Of Joy with Dave Liebman & Cecil McBee (Anami, 1999)
- Presence Of Truth with Hilton Ruiz (Anami, 1999)
- Presence Of Mastery with Paul Shaffer (Anami, 1999)
- Auspicious Healing! (Anami, 2000)
- Breaking The Wheel Of Life And Death featuring Marilyn Crispell (Anami, 2000)
- Parallel Reality featuring Rashied Ali (Anami, 2000)
- The Hu-Man Spirit (Anami, 2001)
- Shaman-Bala featuring Rashied Ali (Anami, 2002)
- Divine Radiance (Dreyfus/Anami, 2003)
- Love At First Sound (Anami, 2005)
- Beauty As Beauty featuring John Medeski (Anami, 2013)
- Beauty As Ugly featuring John Medeski (Anami, 2013)
- Ugly As Ugliest featuring John Medeski (Anami, 2013)
- Incomprehensibly Gone featuring Steve Kuhn (Anami, 2013)
- Free Freedom (Anami, 2013)
- Heart To Heart featuring Marilyn Crispell (Anami, 2013)
- Divine Radiance Live (Anami, 2013)
- Omega Nebula: The Afterlife (Anami, 2014)
- Parasamgate Nebula: The Death Of Death featuring John Medeski (Anami, 2014)
- Mountain Peak featuring Pharoah Sanders (Anami, 2014)
- Space Of Fire (Anami, 2015)
- Let The Sound Go Forth featuring Paul Shaffer & Ravi Coltrane (Anami, 2014)
- Healing Waters featuring Paul Shaffer & Ravi Coltrane (Anami, 2014)
- Taking You Out There! Live featuring Paul Shaffer (Anami, 2014)
- Realization Of Paradox (Anami, 2014)
- Sky Worlds - Heaven Born featuring Ravi Coltran & Rashied Ali (Anami, 2014)
- Heart Trance Revelation featuring Billy Hart & John Medeski (Anami, 2014)
- Maha Shiva: The Razor's Healing Edge featuring John Medeski (Anami, 2014)
- Sacred Function featuring Chris Caswell (Anami, 2014)
- The Heart Is The Universe featuring John Medeski (Anami, 2014)
- Beautiful Empty Fullness featuring Marilyn Crispell (Anami, 2014)
- The Paradox Of Independence featuring Marilyn Crispell (Anami, 2014)
- Songs Of Soundlessness featuring John Medeski (Anami, 2015)
- Genius Awakening with Chris Caswell (Anami, 2015)
- Spirit First And Last (Anami, 2015)
- The Paradox Of Friendship (Anami, 2015)
- The Paradox Of Perfection featuring John Medeski (Anami, 2015)
- The Paradox Of Completion featuring Paul Shaffer & Lew Soloff (Anami, 2015)
- Master Of Silence (Anami, 2015)
- Ensoundment Protection with John Medeski (Anami, 2015)
- Alpha Nebula Expanded: The Monster Peace (Anami, 2015)
- Creating Silence featuring John Medeski (Anami, 2015)
- Heaven Is Freedom featuring John Medeski (Anami, 2015)
- Dead Awake (Anami, 2015)
- Drop Dead (Anami, 2015)
- When Coltrane Calls! Session 1: Fierce Compassion with John Medeski (Anami, 2016)
- When Coltrane Calls! Session 2: Liberation First with Paul Shaffer (Anami, 2016)
- When Coltrane Calls! Session 3: Living Immortality with John Medeski (Anami, 2016)
- Atoned Predestination (Anami, 2016)
- Tathagata Guitar: Whisperings Of Peace (Anami, 2016)
- Heart Ground (Anami, 2016)
- Burning The Bed (Anami, 2016)
- Atoms Of Supersoul featuring Dave Liebman (Anami, 2016)
- Scream Of Ensoundment featuring Dave Liebman (Anami, 2017)
- Immortal Drumming featuring Billy Hart (Jabali) (Anami, 2020)
- Co-emerging Fullness (Anami, 2021)
