= Rashied Ali =

American free jazz and avant-garde drummer (1933–2009)

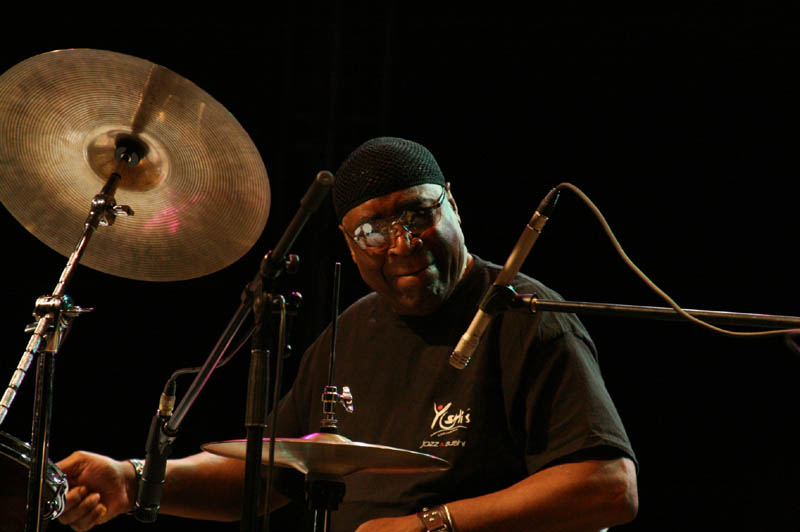

Background information
- Birth name: Robert Patterson
- Born: July 1, 1933; Philadelphia, Pennsylvania, U.S.
- Died: August 12, 2009 (aged 76); New York City, U.S.
- Genres: Jazz
- Occupation: Musician
- Instrument: Drums
- Years active: 1963–2009
- Labels: Tzadik
- Formerly of: Phalanx
- Website: rashiedali.org

Rashied Ali, born Robert Patterson (July 1, 1933 – August 12, 2009), was an American free jazz and avant-garde drummer who was best known for performing with John Coltrane in the last years of Coltrane's life.

== Biography ==
=== Early life ===
Patterson was born and raised in Philadelphia, Pennsylvania. His family was musical; his mother sang with Jimmie Lunceford. His brother, Muhammad Ali, is also a drummer, who played with Albert Ayler. Ali, his brother, and his father converted to Islam.

Starting off as a pianist, he eventually took up the drums, via trumpet and trombone. He joined the United States Army and played with military bands during the Korean War. After his military service, he returned home and studied with Philly Joe Jones, then toured with Sonny Rollins.

=== Career ===
Ali moved to New York in 1963 and worked in groups with Bill Dixon and Paul Bley. He was scheduled to be the second drummer alongside Elvin Jones on John Coltrane's free jazz album Ascension, but he dropped out just before the recording was to take place. Coltrane did not replace him and settled for one drummer. Ali recorded with Coltrane beginning in 1965 on the album Meditations.

Among his credits are the last recorded work by Coltrane (The Olatunji Concert) and Interstellar Space, an album of duets recorded earlier in 1967. Ali "became important in stimulating the most avant-garde kinds of jazz activities," playing what Coltrane described as "multi-directional rhythms". After Coltrane's death, Ali performed with his widow, pianist Alice Coltrane. During the early 1970s, he ran Ali's Alley, a loft club in New York City, and founded his own label, Survival Records.

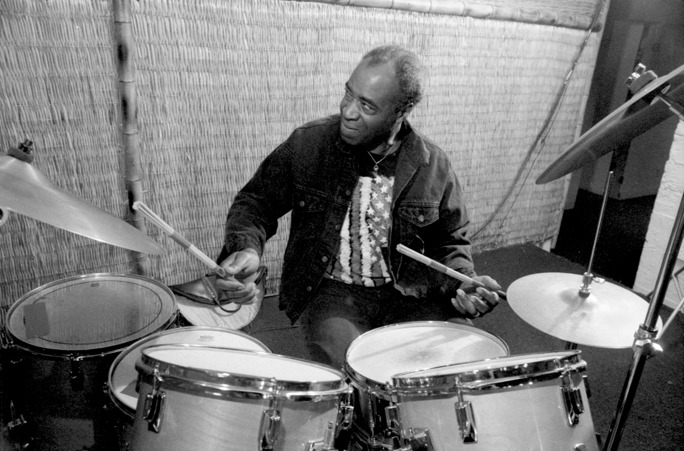
Ali in a duo with Billy Bang at the Koncept Cultural Gallery, Oakland, California, July 26, 1991

He was a visiting artist at Wesleyan University, sponsored by Clifford Thornton. Ali also briefly formed a non-jazz group called Purple Trap with Japanese experimental guitarist Keiji Haino and jazz-fusion bassist Bill Laswell. Their album, Decided...Already the Motionless Heart of Tranquility, Tangling the Prayer Called "I", was released by Tzadik Records in March 1999.

During the 1980s, he was member of Phalanx, a group with guitarist James Blood Ulmer, tenor saxophonist George Adams, and bassist Sirone.

In 1985, Ali performed with the band There Goes the Neighborhood with Jaco Pastorius, Jorma Kaukonen, Doug McClean, Whitie Melvin, and Ben Prevo. From 1997 to 2003 he played extensively with Tisziji Munoz in a group that usually included Pharoah Sanders.

Though known for his work in jazz, Ali contributed to other experimental art forms, including multi-media performances with the Gift of Eagle Orchestra and Cosmic Legends, performances such as Devachan and the Monads, Dwarf of Oblivion, which took place at The Kitchen Center for Performance Art, and a tribute to John Cage in New York's Central Park. Other artists of the orchestra and Cosmic Legends have included Hayes Greenfield (sax), Perry Robinson (clarinet), Wayne Lopes (guitar), Dave Douglas (trumpeter), Gloria Tropp (vocals), Louise Landes Levi (sarangi), director/pianist Sylvie Degiez along with poets and actors Ira Cohen, Taylor Mead, and Judith Malina.

=== Later life ===
During the last years of his life, Ali led his own quintet. A double album entitled Judgment Day was recorded in February 2005 and features Jumaane Smith on trumpet, Lawrence Clark on tenor saxophone, Greg Murphy on piano, and Joris Teepe on bass. This album was recorded at Ali's own Survival Studio, which has been in existence since the 1970s.

In addition to his performance activities, Ali served as mentor to young drummers such as Matt Smith.

In 2007, Ali recorded Going to the Ritual in duo with bassist/violinist Henry Grimes with a second duo recording in post-production at the time of Ali's death. Ali and Grimes also played five duo concerts together between 2007 and 2009 and a sixth concert in June 2007 with pianist Marilyn Crispell. Ali is the featured drummer on Azar Lawrence's album Mystic Journey, recorded in April 2009 and released in May 2010.

== Death ==
Rashied Ali died at the age of 76 in a Manhattan hospital after suffering a heart attack. He was survived by wife Patricia and three children.

== Discography ==
=== As leader or co-leader ===
- 1973 – Duo Exchange (Survival, reissued by Knit Classics) with Frank Lowe
- 1973 – Rashied Ali Quintet (Survival, reissued by Knit Classics) with James Blood Ulmer
- 1973 – New Directions in Modern Music (Survival, reissued by Knit Classics) with Carlos Ward, Fred Simmons, Stafford James
- 1976 – Moon Flight (Survival, reissued by Knit Classics)
- 1976 – N.Y. Ain't So Bad (Survival, reissued by Knit Classics)
- 1976 – Swift Are the Winds of Life (Survival, reissued by Knit Classics) with Leroy Jenkins
- 1989 – Rashied Ali in France (Blue Music Group)
- 1994 – Island Universe (Soul Note) with Jeff Palmer, Arthur Blythe, and John Abercrombie
- 1996 – The October Revolution (Evidence) with Joe McPhee, Borah Bergman, and Wilber Morris
- 1997 – Live (Zero In) with Ivo Perelman and William Parker
- 1999 – Rings of Saturn (Knitting Factory), duets with tenor saxophonist Louie Belogenis
- 1999 – Decided... Already the Motionless Heart of Tranquility, Tangling the Prayer Called "I" (Tzadik) with Purple Trap (Bill Laswell, Keiji Haino, Ali)
- 2001 – Live at Tonic (DIW) with Wilber Morris and Louie Belogenis
- 2001 – Deals, Ideas & Ideals (Hopscotch) with Peter Kowald and Assif Tsahar
- 2001 – No One in Particular (Survival) with Rashied Ali Quintet
- 2004 – The Dynamic Duo Remember Trane and Bird (Ayler) with Arthur Rhames
- 2006 – Judgment Day Vol. 1 (Survival) with Rashied Ali Quintet
- 2006 – Judgment Day Vol. 2 (Survival) with Rashied Ali Quintet
- 2008 – Going to the Ritual (Porter) with bassist Henry Grimes
- 2009 – At the Vision Festival (Blue Music Group) with Greg Tardy, James Hurt, Omer Avital
- 2009 – Eddie Jefferson at Ali's Alley (Blue Music Group) with Eddie Jefferson
- 2009 – Cutt'n Korners (Blue Music Group) with Greg Tardy, Antoine Drye and Abraham Burton
- 2009 – Live in Europe (Survival) with Rashied Ali Quintet
- 2010 – Spirits Aloft (Porter) with bassist Henry Grimes
- 2020 – First Time Out: Live at Slugs 1967 (Survival) with Rashied Ali Quintet

With Afro Algonquin (Lee Rozie, Rick Rozie, Ali)

- 1980 – Afro Algonquin (Moers)

With By Any Means (Charles Gayle, William Parker, Ali)

- 1993 – Touchin' on Trane (FMP)
- 2008 – Live at Crescendo (Ayler Records)

With Prima Materia

- 1994 – Peace on Earth: The Music of John Coltrane (Knitting Factory) with guests John Zorn, Allan Chase
- 1995 – Meditations (Knitting Factory)
- 1995 – Bells (Knitting Factory)
- 2009 – Configurations: The Music of John Coltrane (Blue Music Group)

=== As sideman ===
With Gary Bartz

- Home! (Milestone, 1970)

With Peter Brötzmann

- Songlines (FMP, 1994)

With Michael Bocian

- Go Groove (1991)

With Marion Brown

- Marion Brown Quartet (1966)
- Why Not? (1968)

With Alice Coltrane

- A Monastic Trio (1968)
- Huntington Ashram Monastery (1969)
- Journey in Satchidananda (1970)
- Universal Consciousness (1971)

With John Coltrane

- Meditations (Impulse!, 1965)
- Live at the Village Vanguard Again! (Impulse!, 1966)
- Live in Japan (Impulse!, 1966)
- Offering: Live at Temple University (Resonance, 1966)
- Interstellar Space (Impulse!, 1967)
- Stellar Regions (Impulse!, 1967)
- Expression (Impulse!, 1967)
- The Olatunji Concert: The Last Live Recording (Impulse!, 1967)
- Cosmic Music (Impulse!, 1968)

With Hal Galper

- Art Work (Origin, 2009)

With Rudolph Grey

- Implosion '73 (New Alliance, 1991)
- Mask of Light (New Alliance, 1991)

With the John Lewis Sound

- Get to This Y'all! (Miles Ahead, 2003)

With Jackie McLean

- 'Bout Soul (Blue Note, 1967)

With Tisziji Munoz

- The River of Blood (Anami Music, 1997)
- Present Without A Trace (Anami Music, 1997)
- Spirit World (Anami Music, 1997)
- Presence of Truth (Anami Music, 1999)
- Presence of Joy (Anami Music, 1999)
- Presence of Mastery (Anami Music, 1999)
- Breaking the Wheel of Life and Death (Anami Music, 2000)
- Parallel Reality (Anami Music, 2000)
- The Hu-Man Spirit (Anami Music, 2001)
- Shaman-Bala (Anami Music, 2002)
- Divine Radiance (Anami Music, 2003)
- Divine Radiance Live! (Anami Music, 2013)
- Paul Shaffer Presents: Tisziji Muñoz – Divine Radiance Live! DVD (Anami Music, 2013)
- Sky Worlds (Anami Music, 2014)

With David Murray

- Body and Soul (1993)

With Phalanx

- Original Phalanx (DIW, 1987)
- In Touch (DIW, 1988)

With Henry Rollins

- Everything (Thirsty Ear, 1996)

With the Saheb Sarbib Quintet

- It Couldn't Happen Without You (Soul Note, 1984)

With Archie Shepp

- On This Night (Impulse, 1965)

With Alan Shorter

- Orgasm (Verve, 1968; reissued in 1969 as Parabolic)

With Andrew Sterman

- Blue Canvas with Spiral (Breath River, 2003)

With Stoker

- Syncopate (Douglas Music, 1997)

With the Joris Teepe Big Band

- We Take No Prisoners (Challenge, 2009)

With James Blood Ulmer

- Music Speaks Louder Than Words (DIW, 1996)

With Frank Wright

- Blues for Albert Ayler (ESP-Disk, 2012)
