= Arthur Rhames =

American musician

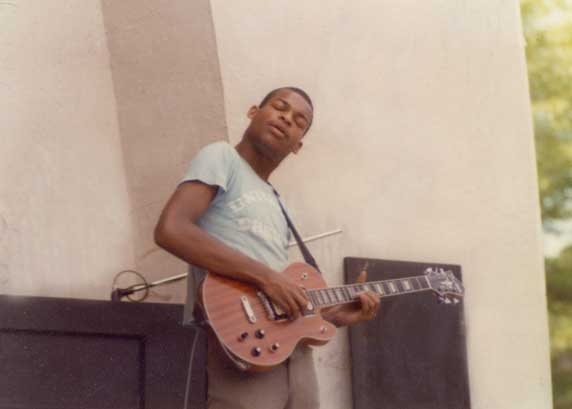
- Arthur Rhames with Eternity at the Prospect Park Band Shell c. 1978

Background information
- Born: October 25, 1957; Brooklyn, New York, U.S.
- Died: December 27, 1989 (aged 32) Newark, New Jersey, U.S.
- Genres: Free jazz, rock, R&B
- Occupation: Musician
- Instruments: Piano, guitar, tenor saxophone
- Years active: 1977–1989

Arthur Rhames (October 25, 1957 – December 27, 1989) was an American guitarist, tenor saxophonist, and pianist.

== Biography ==
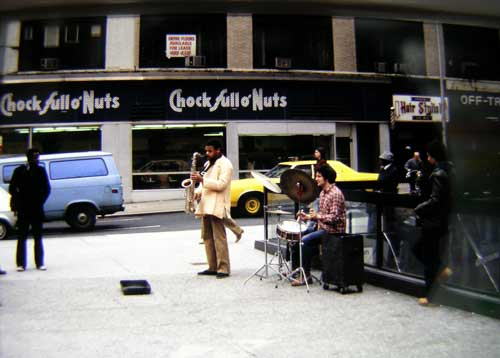
Busking by Union Square, Manhattan with Charles Telerant on drums, c. 1980

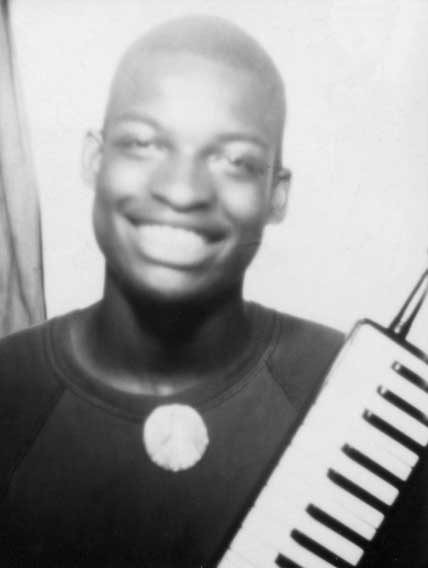
Young Arthur with melodica

Multi-instrumentalist Arthur Rhames, born in Bedford Stuyvesant, began his professional career on the electric guitar in funk/R&B acts in the early 1970s. In 1978, he joined a trio, Eternity, with bassist Cleve Alleyne and drummer Adrian Grannum (later replaced by percussionist Collin Young). He played numerous gigs in the Tri-state area as Eternity's guitarist, including annual shows on the Prospect Park sound stage and at several local colleges. While the Mahavishnu Orchestra-inspired power trio remained unsigned, word-of-mouth buzz surrounding the band began to spread, ultimately culminating in a series of dates opening for Larry Coryell's fusion ensemble Eleventh House.

Although these performances won Rhames audience acclaim, and even his own Guitar World profile, backstage tensions between Arthur and the concerts' headliner emerged: Coryell refused to acknowledge him as a guitarist, referring to Rhames only as "the piano player." After five or six shows, they left the tour. Nevertheless, Arthur made a cameo appearance as a session player on Coryell's 1978 solo album, Difference.

After Eternity dissolved around 1980, and a long stretch busking as a street musician in and around Manhattan on sax with keyboardist and drummer Charles Telerant, he often collaborated as saxophonist with Coltrane drummer Rashied Ali, eventually incorporating as The Dynamic Duo. They appeared at the 1981 Willisau Jazz Festival in Switzerland; a recording of the concert was released by Ayler Records in 2004 with the title The Dynamic Duo Remember Trane and Bird. In October of the same year, recordings of his former trio, including pianist John Esposito and drummer Jeff Siegel, were made at a New York club session, featuring impressive interpretations of Coltrane classics "Giant Steps," "Moment's Notice" and "Bessie's Blues," as well as a cover of Albert Ayler's "I Want Jesus To Talk To Me." They were later released on the Japanese DIW label (Live from Soundscape). Arthur was only 24 years old. In 1988, he re-joined Rashied Ali in a quartet at New York's Knitting Factory.

Despite his much-admired technical virtuosity and unmatched dedication - he was notorious among local musicians for daily practice sessions frequently lasting up to 18 hours - he was unable to secure a recording contract before succumbing to AIDS-related illness at the age of 32 in 1989.

According to a 1990 interview with Vernon Reid, prior to his death, Rhames was working as a security guard in complete obscurity. However, on the official Arthur Rhames website, former Rhames sideman Charles Telerant states that late in his life, he toured in support of P-Funk's George Clinton as a guitarist, after having shown up to audition in his security uniform. Telerant also relates the following anecdote:

Some years ago I was sitting in the office of Brian Bacchus who was vice president of A&R at Antilles Records at the time. "Who have you played with?" he asked. "A guy from Brooklyn named Arthur Rhames" I replied. "Arthur Rhames?! " he practically screamed. "You played with Arthur Rhames? Where can I find him? I'd sign him right now!" "You can't Brian", I replied. "Arthur died three weeks ago."

According to Reid, Rhames was a "deeply closeted" homosexual, and was "afraid that if he was 'out' that all of us in the 'hood who loved and worshipped him as an artist would turn our backs on him." In his final days, ravaged by AIDS, Reid recalls him saying, with complete optimism, "When I get better and get out of here I'm going to concentrate on the blues because this experience has given me a new insight into human suffering."

== Quotes ==
- "Improvisation is an intuitive process for me now, but in the way in which it's intuitive, I'm calling upon all the resources of all the years of my playing at once: my academic understanding of the music, my historical understanding of the music, and my technical understanding of the instrument that I'm playing. All these things are going into one concentrated effort to produce something that is indicative of what I'm feeling at the time I'm performing. " - Arthur Rhames
- "Without directly copying his melodic line, I tried to get the feeling of the line, the phrasing, which allowed me to understand how Trane was talking when he played. What I wanted was the form, the basket that he was using, but the contents I wanted to fill myself. I knew that I had something to say, and I wanted to deal with that. So what I copied was the way John constructed his phrases and their rhythmical base, the stems without the notes, and I put my own notes and harmony - the things I thought about - on top of it."

== Discography ==
- The Dynamic Duo Remember Trane and Bird (Ayler, 1981 [2004]) by Rashied Ali & Arthur Rhames
- Live from Soundscape (DIW, 1981) by Arthur Rhames Trio
- Two in NYC (Ayler, 1980–1982 [2008]) with Charles Telerant
- Steve Arrington's Hall of Fame, Vol.1 (Atlantic, 1983) by Steve Arrington
