= Porter Records =

Porter Records is a United States record label that specializes in jazz, hiphop, electronic, world, and experimental music. Its catalog is self-described as "music for the eclectic listener", with albums by artists Henry Grimes, Joe Chambers, Pregnant, Matthew Welch, Heikki Sarmanto, Chll Pll, and Mason Lindahl, among others.

== See also ==
- List of record labels
