= Survival Records =

American free jazz record label

- Founded: 1972; 54 years ago
- Founder: Rashied Ali
- Genre: Free jazz
- Country of origin: United States
- Location: New York City
- Official website: rashied-ali.bandcamp.com

Survival Records is an independent record label that focuses on free jazz. It was founded in 1972 by American drummer Rashied Ali.

== History ==
Ali co-founded Survival with saxophonist Frank Lowe in 1972, after experiencing frustration with being unable to secure a release with a major record label.

Survival's inaugural release was Duo Exchange, an Ali / Lowe duet recorded in the fall of 1972 and issued in 1973. Lowe's involvement with the label ceased following the release of the album, but Survival went on to issue a total of ten albums prior to Ali's death in 2009, along with CD reissues of original Survival LPs, released in conjunction with Michael Dorf's Knit Classics label.

In 2020, Survival was revived, thanks to the efforts of Ali's family. That year saw the release of two recordings remastered from the drummer's massive recorded archive: Duo Exchange: Complete Sessions, an expanded version of the original 1973 release, and First Time Out: Live at Slugs 1967, a live album featuring an early incarnation of Ali's Quintet. The family plans to continue expanding the Survival catalogue with the addition of "further treasures."
