= Solo =

Solo or SOLO may refer to:

== Arts and entertainment ==
=== Characters ===
- Han Solo, a Star Wars character
- Jacen Solo, a Jedi in the non-canonical Star Wars Legends continuity
- Kylo Ren (Ben Solo), a Star Wars character
- Napoleon Solo, from the TV spy series Man from U.N.C.L.E.
- Sky Solo, from the comic book series 1963
- Solo (Marvel Comics), a fictional counter-terrorism operative

=== Films ===
- Solo (1970 film), directed by Jean-Pierre Mocky
- Solo (1972 film), directed by Mike Hoover
- Solo (1977 film), a New Zealand film
- Solo (1984 film), starring Sandra Kerns
- Solo (1996 film), a science fiction action film
- Solo (2006 film), an Australian film written and directed by Morgan O'Neill
- Solo (2008 film), an Australian documentary directed by David Michod and Jennifer Peedom
- Solo (2011 film), a Telugu-language film
- Solo (2013 film), a Canadian thriller
- Solo (2015 film), Uruguayan director Guillermo Rocamora's debut film
- Solo (2017 film), a Tamil-Malayalam film directed by Bejoy Nambiar
- Solo: A Star Wars Story, a 2018 Star Wars film featuring a young Han Solo
- Solo (2018 Spanish film), a 2018 Spanish adventure film starring Aura Garrido
- Solo (2022 film), a documentary
- Solo (2023 film), a drama directed by Sophie Dupuis
- Solos (film), a 2007 Singaporean drama

=== Literature ===
- Solo, a 1948 novel by Paul Tabori
- Solo, a 1980 novel by Jack Higgins
- Solo: An American Dreamer in Europe – 1933-34, a 1983 non-fiction book by Wright Morris
- Solo, a 1992 novel by Jill Mansell
- Solo (Mason novel), a 1992 science fiction novel by Robert Mason
- Solo, a 1995 picture book by Paul Geraghty
- Solos, a 2004 novel by Kitty Burns Florey
- Atlantic Shift, a. k. a. Solo, a 2004 novel by Emily Barr
- Solo: Writers on Pilgrimage, a 2004 anthology by Katherine Govier
- Solo: My Adventure in the Air, a 2005 memoir by Clyde Edgerton
- Solo, a 2007 novel by Alyssa Brugman
- Solo, a 2009 novel by Rana Dasgupta
- Solo (Boyd novel), a 2013 James Bond novel by William Boyd
- Solo, a 2017 novel by Kwame Alexander with Mary Rand Hess
- Solo: A Star Wars Story: Expanded Edition, a novelization of the 2018 Star Wars film by Mur Lafferty
- Solo: A Star Wars Story: A Junior Novel, a 2018 junior novelization of the same film by Joe Schreiber

=== Music ===
==== Terminology ====
- Solo (music), a piece or section played or sung by a single performer
- Solo, a division on an organ console of a pipe organ

==== Groups ====
- Solo (American band), an R&B group from New York City
- Solo (Dutch band), a pop duo with Michiel Flamman and Simon Gitsels

==== Albums ====
- Solo (Kai Winding album), 1963
- Solo (Cecil Taylor album), 1973
- Solo (Jimmy Raney album), 1976
- Solo (Don McLean album), 1976
- Solo (Kaipa album), 1978
- Solo (Egberto Gismonti album), 1979
- Solo (Opus album), 1985
- Solo (Solo album), 1995 album by the American band
- Solo (John Bunch album), 1996
- Solo (Leroy Jenkins album), 1998
- Solo (Hugh Cornwell album), 1999
- Solo (Mulgrew Miller album), 2000
- Solo (DC Talk album), 2001
- Solo (Brian Harvey album), 2002
- Solo (Oscar Peterson album), 2002
- Solo (Michel Camilo album), 2004
- Solo (Ricardo Arjona album), 2004
- Solo (Gonzalo Rubalcaba album), 2005
- Solo (António Pinho Vargas album), 2008
- Solo: Live from San Francisco, a 2009 album by McCoy Tyner
- Solo (Henry Grimes album), 2009
- Solo (Vijay Iyer album), 2010
- Solo (Tony Lucca album), 2011
- Solo (Lynne Arriale album), 2012
- Solo (Nils Frahm album), 2015
- Solo (Gordon Lightfoot album), 2020
- Solo (Ultimo album), 2021
- Solo (soundtrack), from the 2017 film
- Solo (EP), a 2012 EP by Heo Young-saeng
- Solo (Anitta EP), 2018
- Solo: Reflections and Meditations on Monk, a 2017 album by Wadada Leo Smith
- So-Lo, a 1984 Danny Elfman album
- Solo 1: Standards, a 2001 album by pianist Franco D'Andrea
- Solo 2: Abstractions, a 2001 album by pianist Franco D'Andrea
- Solo 3: Woods, a 2001 album by pianist Franco D'Andrea
- Solo 4: Gato, a 2001 album by pianist Franco D'Andrea
- Solo 5: Duke, a 2001 album by pianist Franco D'Andrea
- Solo 6: Valzer Opera Natale, a 2001 album by pianist Franco D'Andrea
- Solo 7: Napoli, a 2001 album by pianist Franco D'Andrea
- Solo 8: Classic Jazz, a 2001 album by pianist Franco D'Andrea
- Solo 2.0, a 2011 album by Italian singer Marco Mengoni
- Solo II, a 2009 album by Portuguese composer António Pinho Vargas
- Solos (Matthew Friedberger album), a 2011 set of six albums
- S.O.L.O., 1989 album by M. Nasir

==== Compositions ====
- Solo (Stockhausen), composed in 1965–66 by Karlheinz Stockhausen
- Solos, Op. 18, by Auguste-Joseph Franchomme (1808–1884)

==== Songs ====
- "Solo" (A.B. Quintanilla song), 2012
- "Solo" (Alsou song), 2000
- "Solo" (Blanka song), 2022, the Poland entry for the Eurovision Song Contest 2023
- "Solo" (Clean Bandit song), 2018
- "Solo" (DD Smash song), 1982
- "Solo" (Frank Ocean song), 2016
  - "Solo (Reprise)", the reprise version
- "Solo" (Iyaz song), 2010
- "Solo" (Jennie song), 2018
- "Solo" (Myles Smith song), 2023
- "Solo (Vuelta al ruedo)", by Marco Mengoni, 2011
- "Solo", by Chew Lips, 2009
- "Solo", by Demi Lovato from Here We Go Again, 2009
- "Solo", by Ekhymosis from Niño Gigante, 1993
- "Solo", by Peter Bardens, 1985
- "Solo", by Prince from Come, 1994
- "Solo", by The Story So Far from The Story So Far, 2015
- "Solos", by Tony Dize, 2009
- "Solo", by Future from Hndrxx, 2017
- "Solo", by Carly Rae Jepsen from Dedicated Side B

=== Television ===
- Solo (television pilot), 1964 television pilot movie for The Man from U.N.C.L.E.
- Solo (TV series), a British sitcom starring Felicity Kendal
- "Solo" (PEN15), a 2019 episode of the American comedy streaming television series
- Solos (TV series), an anthology drama streaming television series

=== Other arts and entertainment ===
- Solo (residency), a concert residency by Filipina singer Regine Velasquez
- Solo (dance), an individual performance
- Solo (DC Comics), a multi-artist DC comics series
- Dance Dance Revolution Solo, a game sub-series of Dance Dance Revolution by Konami

== Card games ==
- American Solo, often just called Solo
- Denver Solo, variant of Six-Bid Solo
- English Solo, the game of Solo Whist
- German Solo, often just called Solo
- Progressive Solo, same as Denver Solo
- Solo whist, a card game also known as Solo
- Slough (card game), also called Solo

== Brands and enterprises ==
- Solo (Australian soft drink), lemon flavored
- Solo (debit card), a British brand of cash card
- Solo (Norwegian soft drink), orange flavored
- Solo (restaurant), Dutch Michelin starred restaurant
- Solo Beverage Company, a soft drink manufacturer in Trinidad and Tobago
- Solo Cup Company, an American manufacturer of consumer packaging products acquired by Dart Container in 2012
- Solo Foods, an American food company
- Solo Mobile, a communications company
- Solo Oil, former Australian oil company
- SOLO, a brand of matches from Sušice in the Czech Republic

== Education ==
- Stonehearth Open Learning Opportunities (SOLO), a school in Conway, New Hampshire, U.S.
- Structure of observed learning outcome (SOLO), an education taxonomy
- Search Oxford Libraries Online (SOLO), an online union catalogue of the Bodleian Library of Oxford University

== People ==
- Solo (surname), people and fictional characters
- DJ Solo, real name Dave Abrams, American DJ, producer, rapper and visual artist
- Shawn Fonteno (born 1968), nicknamed "Solo", American actor and rapper
- Gary McKinnon (born 1966), nicknamed "Solo", British hacker

== Places ==
- Solo, Fasa, Iran, a village
- Solo, Arkansas, US, an unincorporated community
- Solo, Missouri, US, an unincorporated community
- Cerro Solo or El Solo, a volcano in the Andes
- Cerro Solo (Los Glaciares National Park), a mountain in Argentina
- Solo Nunatak, Victoria Land, Antarctic
- Solo River, the longest river in the Indonesian island of Java
- Surakarta, Indonesia, a city known colloquially as Solo

== Sports ==
- Solo, autocross events sanctioned by the SCCA
- Solo climbing, also known as soloing
- Solo, a skill in the Gaelic games of football and hurling
- Solo racing, a form of Motorcycle speedway racing

== Transport ==
=== Aviation ===
- First solo flight of a trainee pilot

=== Automobiles ===
- ElectraMeccanica Solo, a three-wheeled battery-electric microcar
- Optare Solo, a British-built midibus
- Panther Solo, a British sports car

=== Watercraft ===
- Solo (dinghy), a racing sailboat designed by Jack Holt in 1956
- Solo (yacht), an Australian ex-ocean racing yacht
- MV Solo, a 1977 Greenpeace ship

== Other uses ==
- Solar Orbiter (SolO), a 2020 space mission
- Solo (magazine), a Swedish magazine
- Gateway Solo, a brand of laptop computers
- SOLO, a computer built by Philco for the US National Security Agency
- Solo, a Battleboarding term where powerful character can beat another character

== See also ==
- Alone (disambiguation)
- Soho (disambiguation)
- Solo Solo, PUFFY's 1997 album
- K-Solo (born 1968), real name Kevin Madison, American rapper
