= Perigee (disambiguation) =

Perigee is a type of apsis: an extreme point in an object's orbit.

Perigee may also refer to:

- Perigee: Publication for the Arts, a quarterly literary journal
- Holcomb Perigee, a prototype sportsplane
- Perigee Books, a former imprint of Penguin Group, now part of TarcherPerigee

== See also ==
- Apogee (disambiguation)
- Argument of periapsis
- Perigea, a genus of moths
- Perigean spring tide
- Perigee moon or supermoon
- Perigeo, an Italian progressive rock group
