= Soho (disambiguation) =

Soho is an area of the City of Westminster and part of the West End of London, England.

Soho, SOHO or SoHo may also refer to:

== Places ==
- Palermo Soho, a neighborhood in Buenos Aires, Argentina
- South Hobart, Tasmania, Australia; "SoHo Village"
- London, Ontario, Canada; "Soho" Neighbourhood aka South of Horton Street
- SoHo, Hong Kong, "South of Hollywood Road" in Central district
- Soho, Unnao, a village in Uttar Pradesh, India
- Soho, County Westmeath, Republic of Ireland; a townland
- Sochos, a community in Greece
- Soho, West End of London, United Kingdom
- Soho, West Midlands, England, United Kingdom
- Soho, aka Babington House, a hotel in Somerset, United Kingdom
- SoHo, Manhattan, New York, United States; "South of Houston Street"
- Soho, Tampa, Florida, United States
- Bluff (Pittsburgh), formerly Soho, a neighborhood in Pittsburgh, Pennsylvania, United States
- Cordón Soho, an area of the Cordón neighborhood of Montevideo, Uruguay

== Arts, entertainment, and media ==
=== Television ===
- SoHo (Australian TV channel), an Australian television channel on Foxtel
- SoHo (New Zealand), a New Zealand television channel on Sky Network Television that has since rebranded as HBO

=== Other arts, entertainment, and media ===
- Jessica Soho (born 1964), Filipino television newscaster
- Heer Soho (born 1975), former Pakistani politician
- Tokutomi Sohō (1863–1957), Japanese historian
- Soho (band), an English pop music trio
- Soho House, a museum in Birmingham, England commemorating Matthew Boulton and his association with James Watt
- Soho House (club), private members' club in Soho, London and internationally/hotel chain
- Soho (magazine), a Colombian magazine
- Soho, a play by Keith Waterhouse
- Soho Press, an American publisher
- "Soho (Needless to Say)", a song by Al Stewart appearing on his 1973 album Past, Present and Future
- "Soho" (featuring J.I.D), a song by Boogie appearing on his album Everythings for Sale
- Violent Soho, Australian rock band
- Pepe Soho (1971–2025), Mexican landscape and nature photographer
- Takuan Sōhō (1573–1645), Japanese Buddhist prelate
- Dori Elizabeth Prange, or Ruby Soho (born 1991), WWE fighter

=== Fictional character ===
- Reina Soho (蘇峰 玲奈), a recurring character in Witchblade

== Real estate ==
- SOHO China, a commercial real-estate company in Beijing
- Soho Square Ponsonby, a failed development in the inner-city suburb of Ponsonby in Auckland, New Zealand
- Trump SoHo, a Manhattan hotel now called The Dominick
- Wangjing SOHO, a three tower complex in Beijing, China

== Science ==
- SOHO; self-organizing holarchic open system, see Holon (philosophy)
- Solar and Heliospheric Observatory, a Sun observation spacecraft

== Other uses ==
- Cabot House or South House, a dormitory at Harvard University nicknamed SoHo
- Saho people, or Soho, ethnic group living largely in the Horn of Africa
- Small office/home office, a category of small business

== See also ==
- Solo (disambiguation)
