= Timurid art =

Art of the Timurid Empire

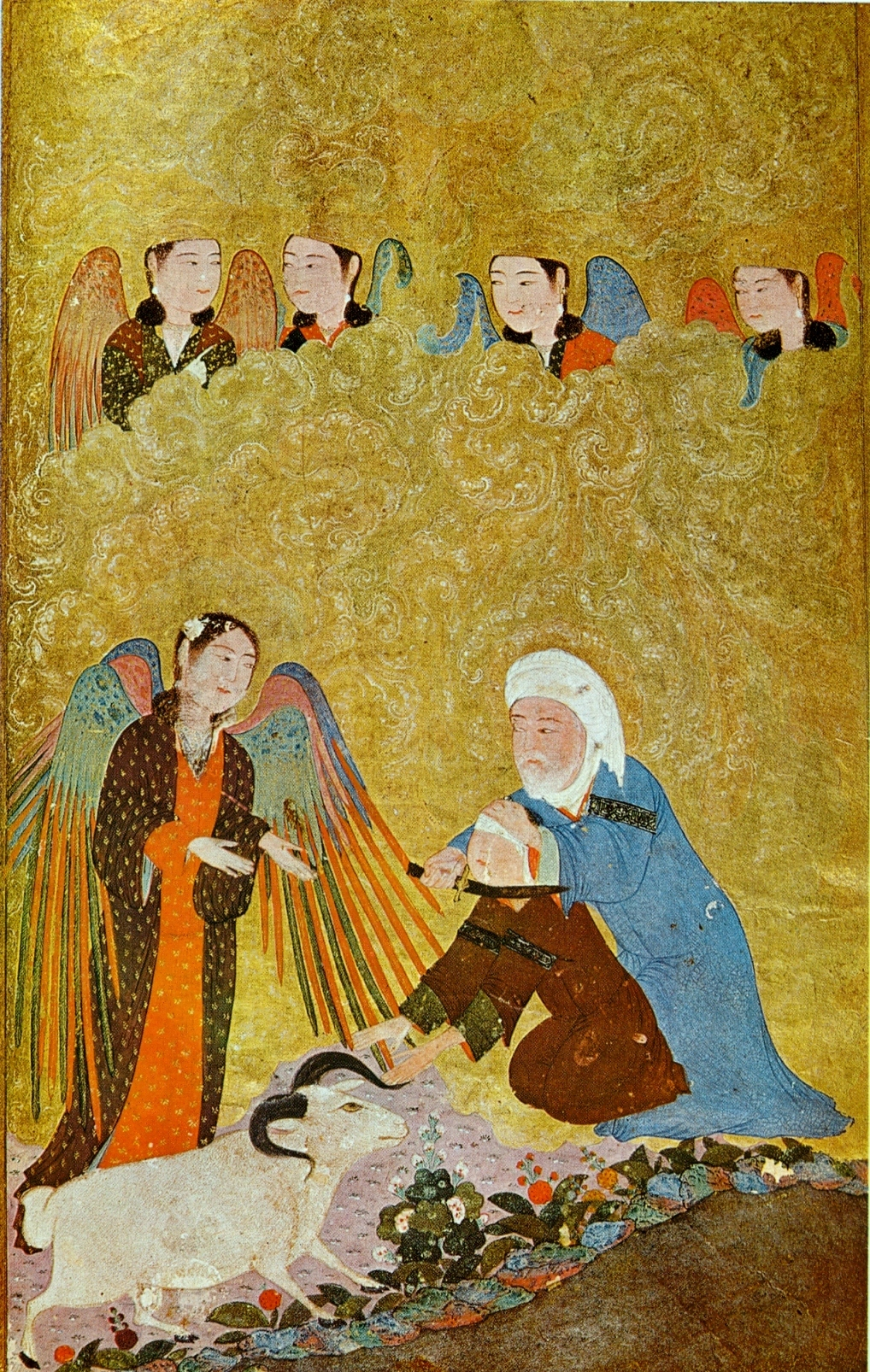
The Angel Hinders the Offering of Isaac, Shiraz 1410.

Timurid art is a style of art originating during the rule of the Timurid Empire (1370-1507) and was spread across Iran and Central Asia. Timurid art was noted for its usage of both Persian and Chinese styles, as well as for taking influence from the art of other civilizations in Central Asia. Scholars regard this time period as an age of cultural and artistic excellence. After the decline of the Timurid Empire, the art of the civilization continued to influence other cultures in West and Central Asia.

Considered a rich period of Persian artistic revival, Timurid art can be characterized by an emphasis on book arts and manuscript illumination as well as luxury arts like metalwork and jade carving. Architecturally, the Timurids had ambitious building programs, most often building Sufi shrines, khanqas, mosques, and madrasas.

== History ==
The Timurid Empire was established by Timor the Lame in 1370 after the conquest of the various Ilkhanate successor states. After conquering a city, the Timurids commonly spared the lives of the local artisans and deported them to the Timurid capital of Samarkand. After the Timurids conquered Persia in the early 15th century, many Persian artistic traits became interwoven with existing Mongol art. Timor the Lame's conversion to Islam later in life made Samarkand one of the centers of Islamic art. In the mid 15th century the empire moved its capital to Herat, which became a focal point for Timurid art. As with Samarkand, Persian artisans and intellectuals soon established Herat as a center for arts and culture. Soon, many of the Timurids adopted Persian culture as their own.

== Architecture ==
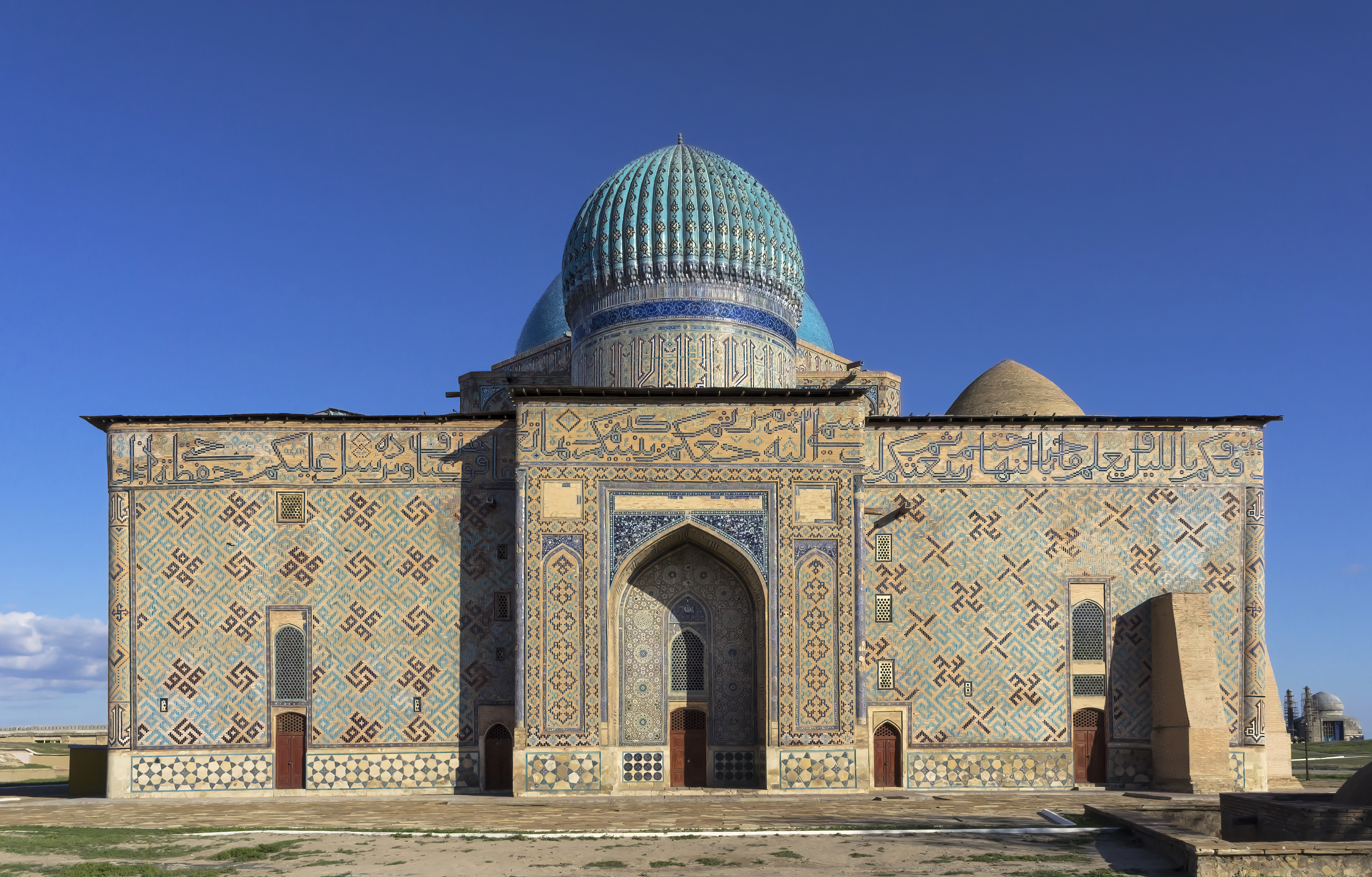
Mausoleum of Khoja Ahmed Yasawi in Hazrat-e Turkestan, Kazakhstan.

The Timurids utilized architecture for political and social means, for example to create a sense of national identity through a uniform aesthetic. Other reasons for architectural patronage include commemorating reigns of rulers and creating spaces for religious purposes and social benefits. Important examples of Timurid architecture mainly preside in Samarkand, Mashhad, Khargird, Tayābid, Baku, and Tabrīz. The most common existing examples of Timurid architecture include congregational mosques, private mosques, mausoleums, madrasas, khanqahs and caravansaries, and Sufi shrines. During the Timurid period, women were especially active patrons of architecture.

The first major work of architectural patronage commissioned by Timur in 1389 was the Mausoleum of Khoja Ahmed Yasawi in Turkestan City. Starting in 1390, in Herāt hundreds of buildings were built within roughly a century. By the 1440s, the Timurids had distinguished themselves aesthetically from previous cultural traditions. Still, they drew from previous traditions such as the Ilkhanid Mongols and their use of height, monumentality, and color.

Distinct features of Timurid architecture include: courtly gardens with hard and soft architecture, large double domes, vaulting systems, axial symmetry, matching inner and outer facades, minarets for compositional framing, and use of mosaics and polychromy tilework.

== Illustration ==
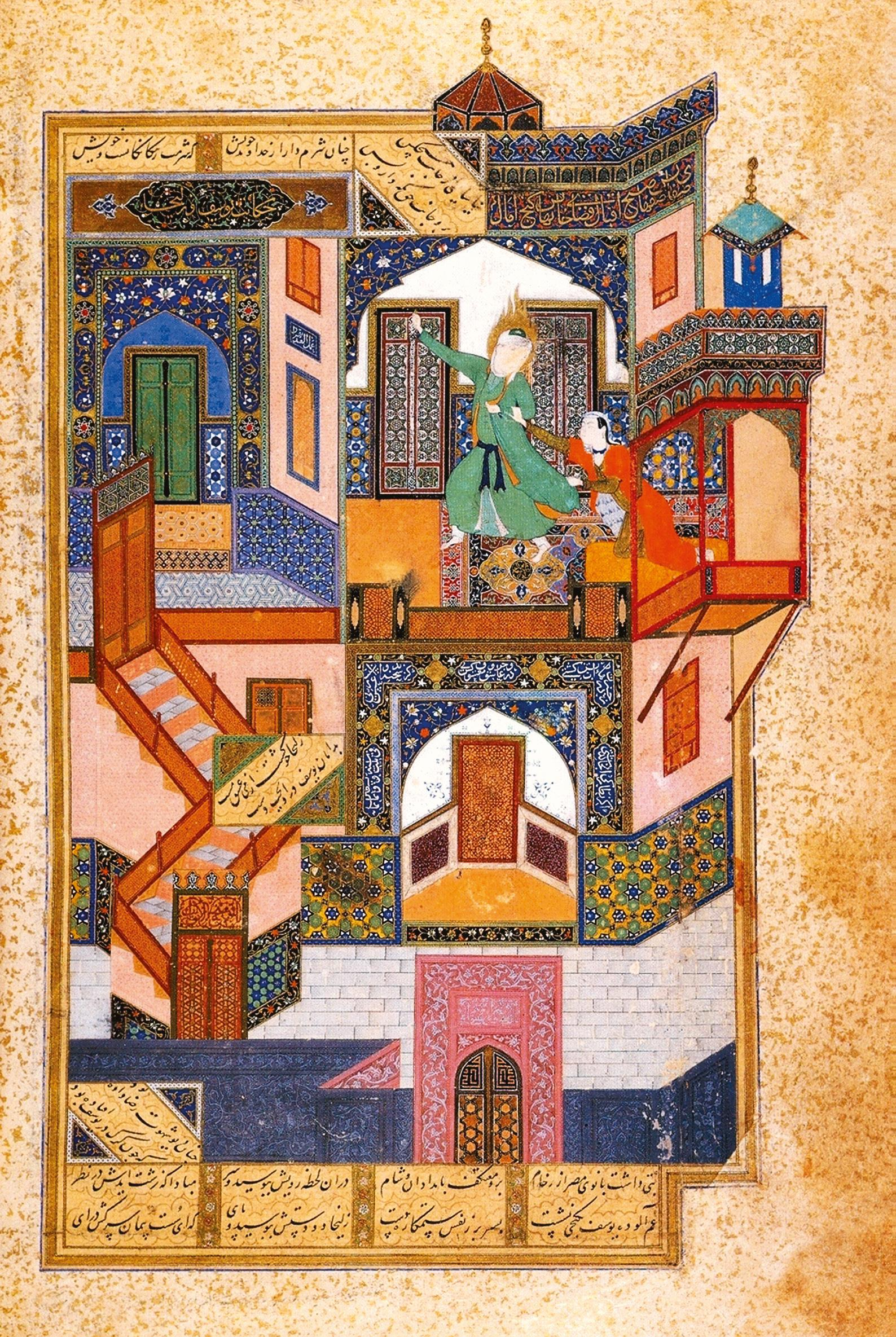
Yusuf and Zulaikha (Joseph chased by Potiphar's wife), miniature by Behzād, 1488. Sa'di, Bustan, Herat. 30,5x21,5 cm. Cairo, National Library, MS. Arab Farsi 908, f. 52v.

Persian manuscript paintings usually are recognized regarding their embellished purpose. The paintings serve as a visual interpretation of the paired passages, customarily indicating royal authority and traditions. Timurid paintings also served as a medium for artistic performance and self-representation, Painters were considered the most skilled in their trade, and were highly regarded. The illustrations often represented what was happening in the text. These pictorials were composed of faithful stories and lessons through vibrant worlds and displays that highlighted themes such as education, government, speech, and religious practice.

Timurid art absorbed and improved upon the traditional Persian concept of the "Arts of the Book". The new, Timurid-inflected works of art saw illustrated paper (as opposed to parchment) manuscripts produced by the empire's artists. These illustrations were notable for their rich colors and elaborate designs. Due to the quality of the miniature paintings found in these manuscripts, Suzan Yalman of the Metropolitan Museum of Art noted that "the Herat school [of manuscript painting] is often regarded as the apogee of Persian painting."

Several Timurid manuscripts, such as the Humay and Humayun, 1427-1428, Herat (Austrian National Library, N.F. 382), created by the Timurid ruler Baysunghur in Herat reflect the style developed by the Jalayirids in Tabriz and Baghdad at the end of the 14th century. The Timurid conquest of these cities led to the transfer of Jalayirid artists and manuscripts to the Timurid courts of Samarkand and Herat, explaining the continuity and improvement of the earlier Jalayirid styles. After temporarilly taking Tabriz from the Qara Qoyunlu in 1421, together with his father Shah Rukh, Baysunghur brought back to Herat a group of Tabrizi artists and calligraphers, formerly working for Ahmad Jalayir, who he installed in Herat to add to his existing artists from Shiraz. They became the most important school of artists in Iran, merging the two styles. In the 16th century, Dust Muhammad Haravi described the Timurid Baysunghur's efforts at emulating Jalayirid art, after his occupation of Tabriz in 1421 and capture of artists from Tabriz:

His Highness Baysunghur Mirza had Master Sidi Ahmad the painter, Khwaja Ali the portraitist and Master Qiwamuddin the bookbinder brought from Tabriz and ordered that after the pleasing manner of Sultan Ahmad of Baghdad's miscellany, they should produce a book in exactly the same format and layout and with the same scenes depicted. The copying of it was given into the charge of Mawlana Fariduddin Ja'far. The binding was commissioned of the aforementioned Master Qiwamuddin, by whom inlay in bindings was invented; and Mir Khalil was put in charge of decoration and depiction of scenes.

— Preface to the Bahram Mirza Album (extract), by Dust Muhammad.

These painting were not limited to manuscripts, as many Timurid artists also created intricate wall paintings. Many of these wall paintings depicted landscapes derived from both Persian and Chinese artistic traditions. While the subject matter of these paintings was borrowed from other cultures, Timurid wall paintings were eventually refined into their own, unique style. Mongol artistic traditions were not entirely phased out, as the highly stylized depictions of human figures seen in 15th-century Timurid art are derived from this culture.

== Manuscripts ==
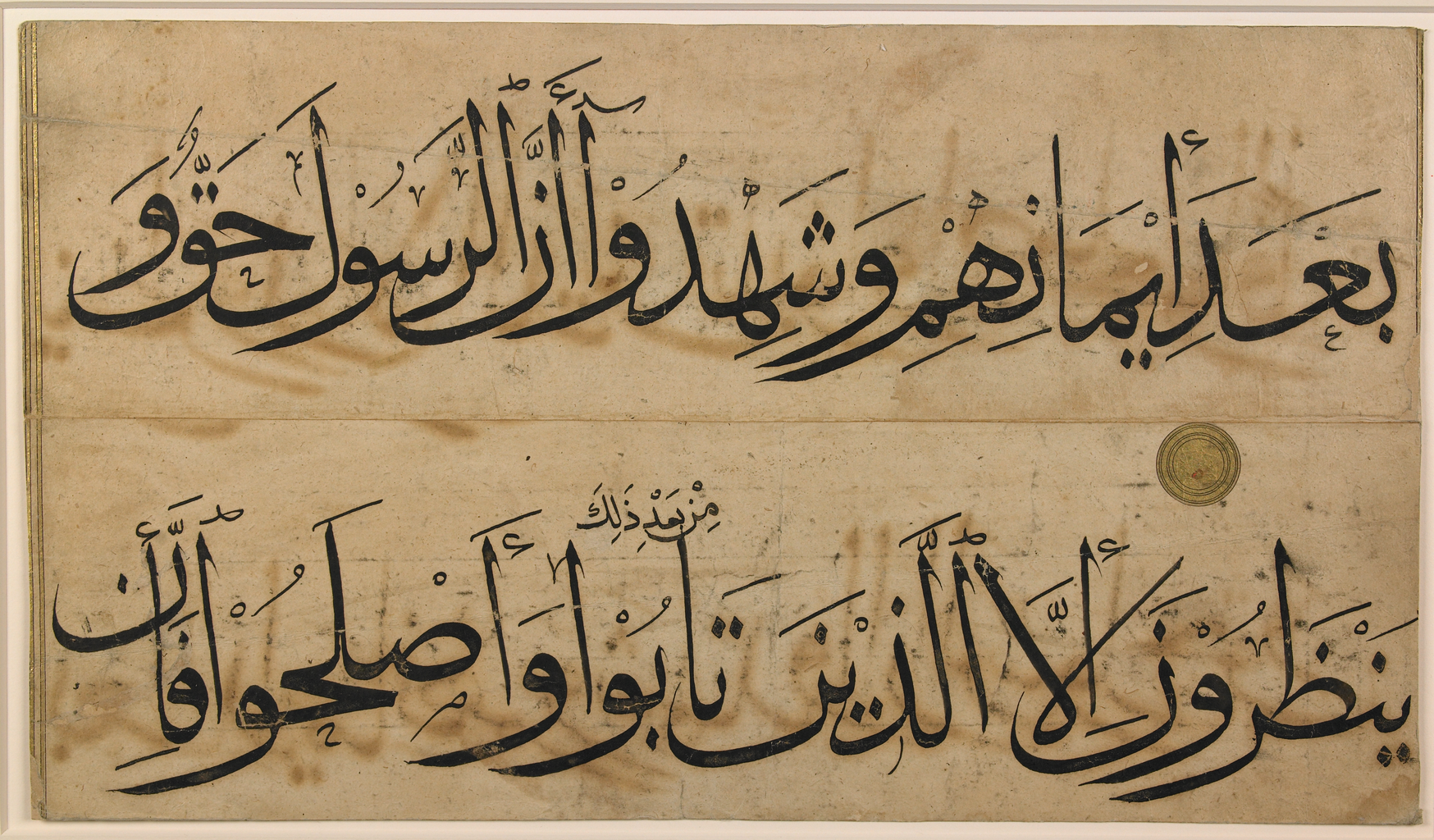
Qur'anic Verses, between 1400 and 1499.

Under the rule of the Timurid Empire, the production of illuminated manuscripts flourished. Characterized by rich colors and elaborate designs, these manuscripts served as essential documents of Timurid material culture and reflected the craftsmanship of differing conquered territories. The Timurid art period is defined by artists and calligraphers such as Kamāl ud-Dīn Behzād, Sultan 'Ali al-Mashhadi, Umar Aqta, Ja'far Baisunghuri and many others. Often the manuscripts were worked on by multiple artists over time, creating a combination of different art styles into each manuscript.

The majority of manuscripts were made in royally-sponsored workshops or kitabkhanas. The Timurids remained true to their heritage by continuing earlier traditions associated with the Ilkhanid Mongols and Jalayirids. This includes the refinement of the six canonical cursive scripts under the Ilkhanid Mongols. They distinguished themselves by developing another cursive script in the late 1300s, nasta'liq.

The height of manuscript manufacturing under the Timurids was under the Herāt school between 1420 and 1440. This school was developed by Timur's son and grandson to artistically represent classical Iranian literature. These important developments in book-making influenced other art forms. Scripts developed for manuscripts appeared on architecture and portable objects. Additionally, designs for books provided foundations for other mediums such as tiles, ceramics, tent-making, stone-cutting, mother-of-pearl, and saddle work.

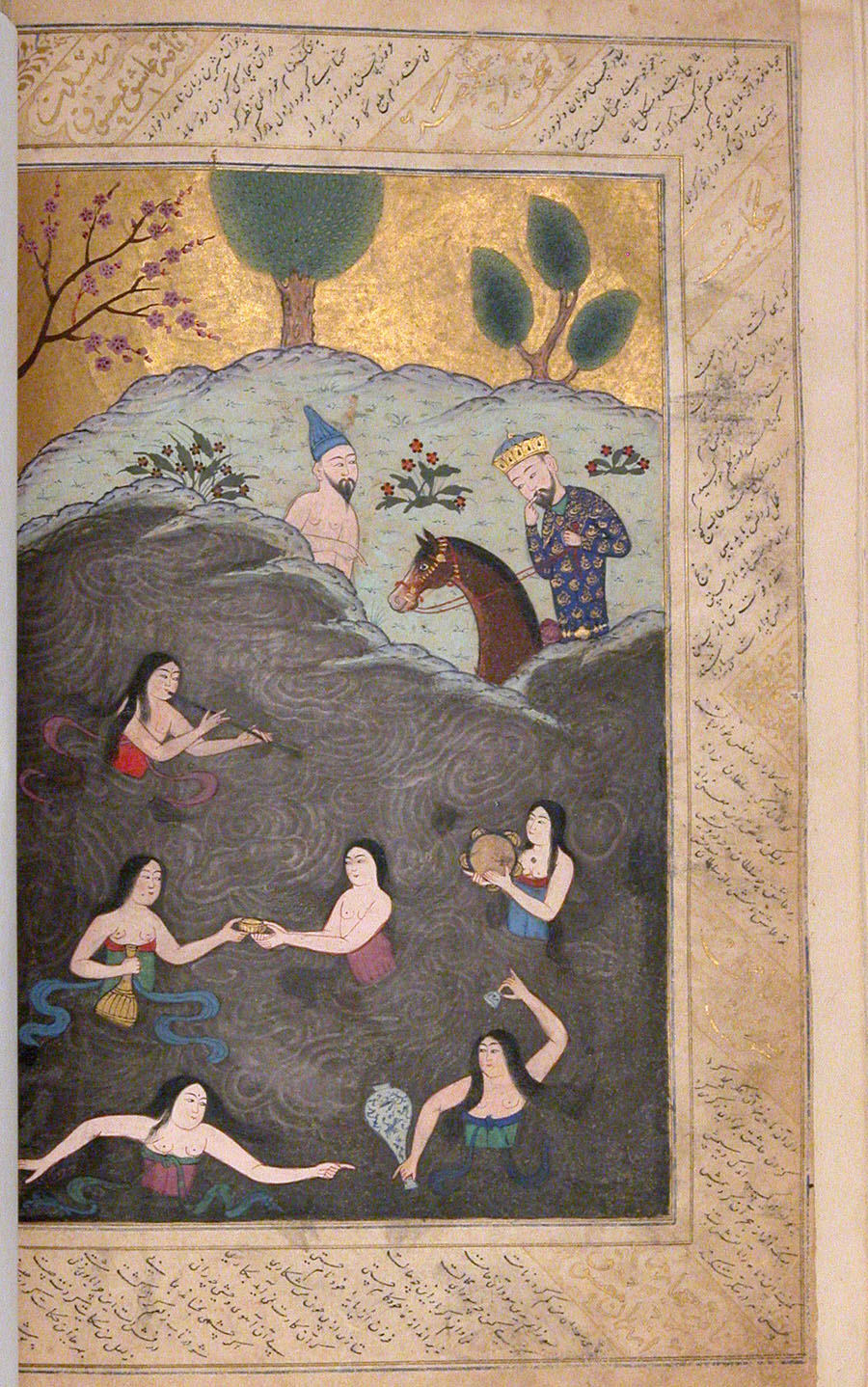
A page from the Anthology of Persian Poetry painted during Iskandar's reign. Painted in Shiraz, 1411.

=== The Cairo Bustan ===
The Cairo Bustan is one of many influential manuscripts recorded in Persian book arts. The Cairo Bustan is among the few surviving illustrated manuscripts that hold records connected to Sultan Husayn Bayqara’s patronage. The manuscript describes and displays its historical content with noble precision, and contains many original paintings of Kamāl ud-Dīn Behzād. Behzād had produced the first complete record of this manuscript as well as its illustrations. He was revered among Persian painters, and defined the height of Islamic manuscript paintings.

=== Anthology of Persian Poetry ===
The Anthology of Persian Poetry is an illuminated manuscript that was copied down during the reign of Iskandar Sultan in 1411. Iskandar Sultan was a patron of the arts, and he was descended from Timur. After the first additions to the manuscript, some pages intended for illustration were left blank. Later these pages would be illustrated by Turkman Aq Quyunlu and other Ottoman creative minds. By observing the style of each addition to the manuscript, historians can tell where the manuscript traveled during its creation. The nasta'liq writing in the manuscript was likely done by Mir ‘Ali Tabrizi, who was a well-known calligrapher of Shiraz manuscripts from 1405 to 1429.

== Metalwork ==
Although lesser in number than manuscripts, the Timurid Empire also produced quality pieces of metalwork following Timur's invasion of Iran. Steel, iron, brass, and bronze were commonly used as mediums. Timurid silver-inlaid steel is often being cited as being of particularly high quality. Additionally, gold and silver vessels required skilled craftsmanship.

In the Islamic period, Herāt was also a center for metalworking. Many of the techniques and designed utilized had their origins in the Sasanian era. The earliest metalwork produced under the Timurids includes a bronze basin and six brass oil lamps, preserved at the Mausoleum of Khoja Ahmed Yasawi. Inscriptions indicate that the basin was made specifically for this context.

Following the collapse of the Timurid Empire, several Iranian and Mesopotamian cultures co-opted Timurid metalwork. Many objects made of precious metals were likely melted down to be repurposed.

== Ceramics and Carving ==
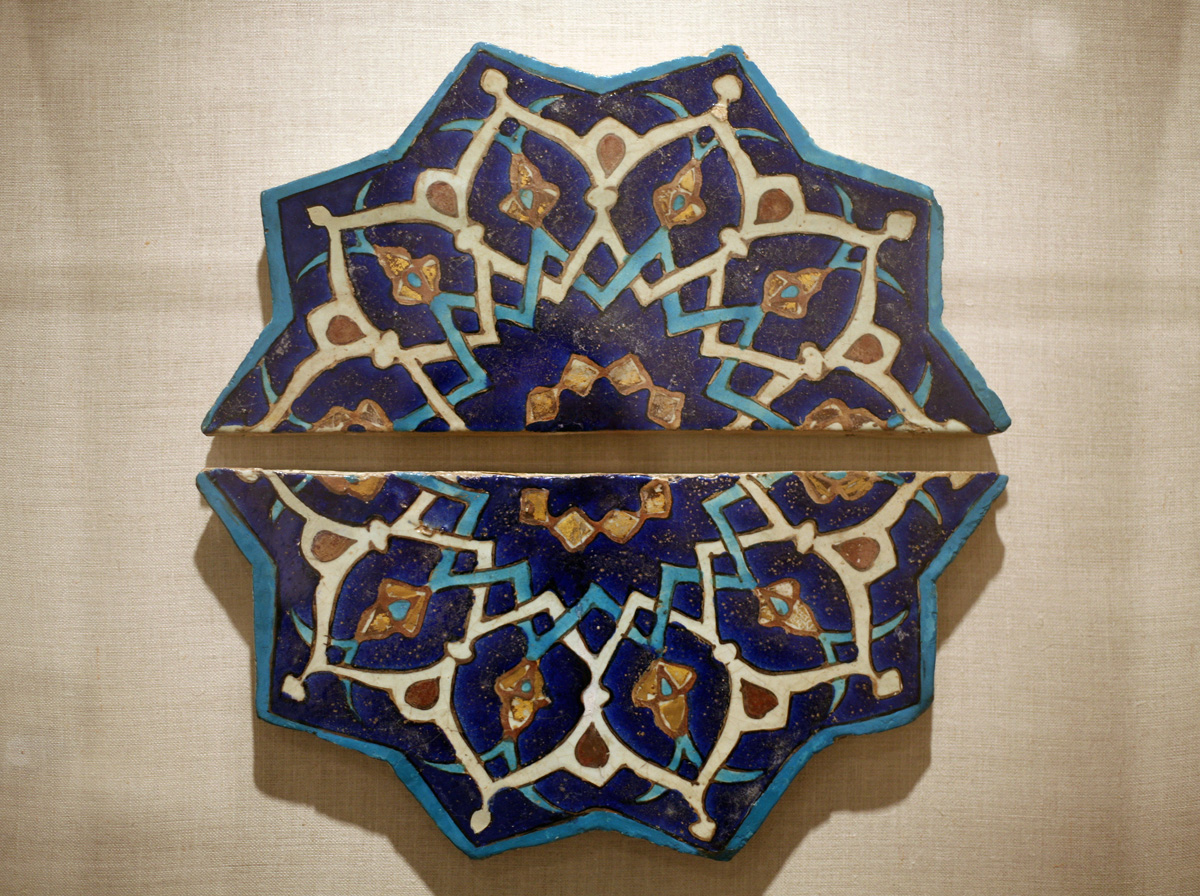
Ten-Pointed Star Tile, mid-15th century. Brooklyn Museum, New York.

Chinese-style ceramics were produced by Timurid artisans. During the Timurid period, mosaics were especially favored, with colored tiles fired and then cut into interlocking shapes. This eventually was overcome by the cuerda seca technique. Different colors can be put onto a tile and then the colored areas are outlined by a greasy substance and the tile is fired. This technique came about as early as the late fourteenth century and was especially popular later on in Safavid Iran.

Jade carving also had a presence in Timurid art, also likely inspired by Chinese art. The Timurids effectively introduced jade carving to the Islamic lands.

== Legacy ==
Following the decline of the Timurid Empire in the late 15th century, the Ottomans, Safavid dynasty, and Mughal Empire co-opted Timurid artistic traditions into their own. The art and architecture produced by the Timurids presents a unique national identity and has served as an inspiration all over the Islamic world, from Anatolia to India.

== Gallery ==
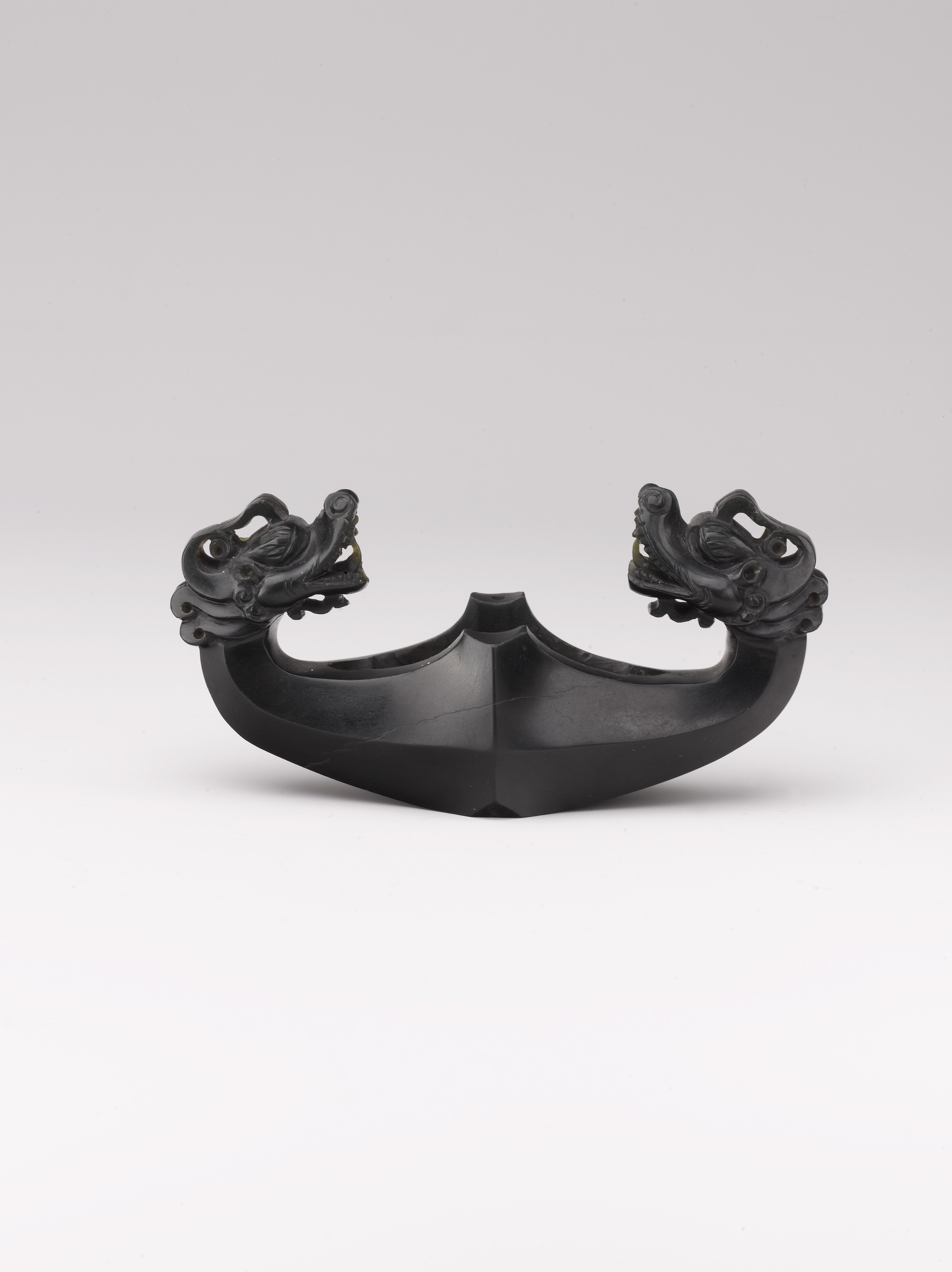
A Timurid carved jade sword hilt.

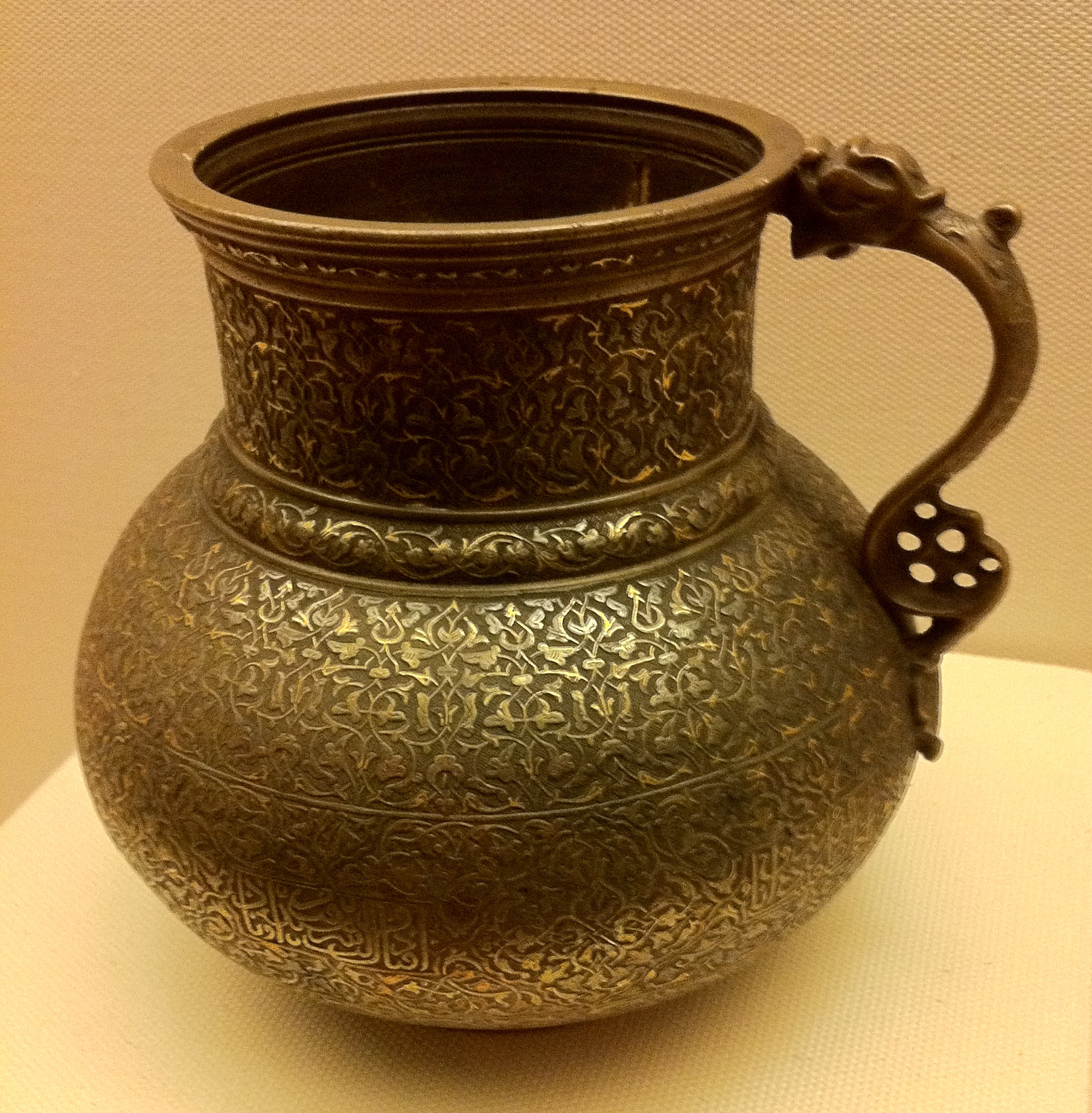
15th century Timurid tankard made in Herat.

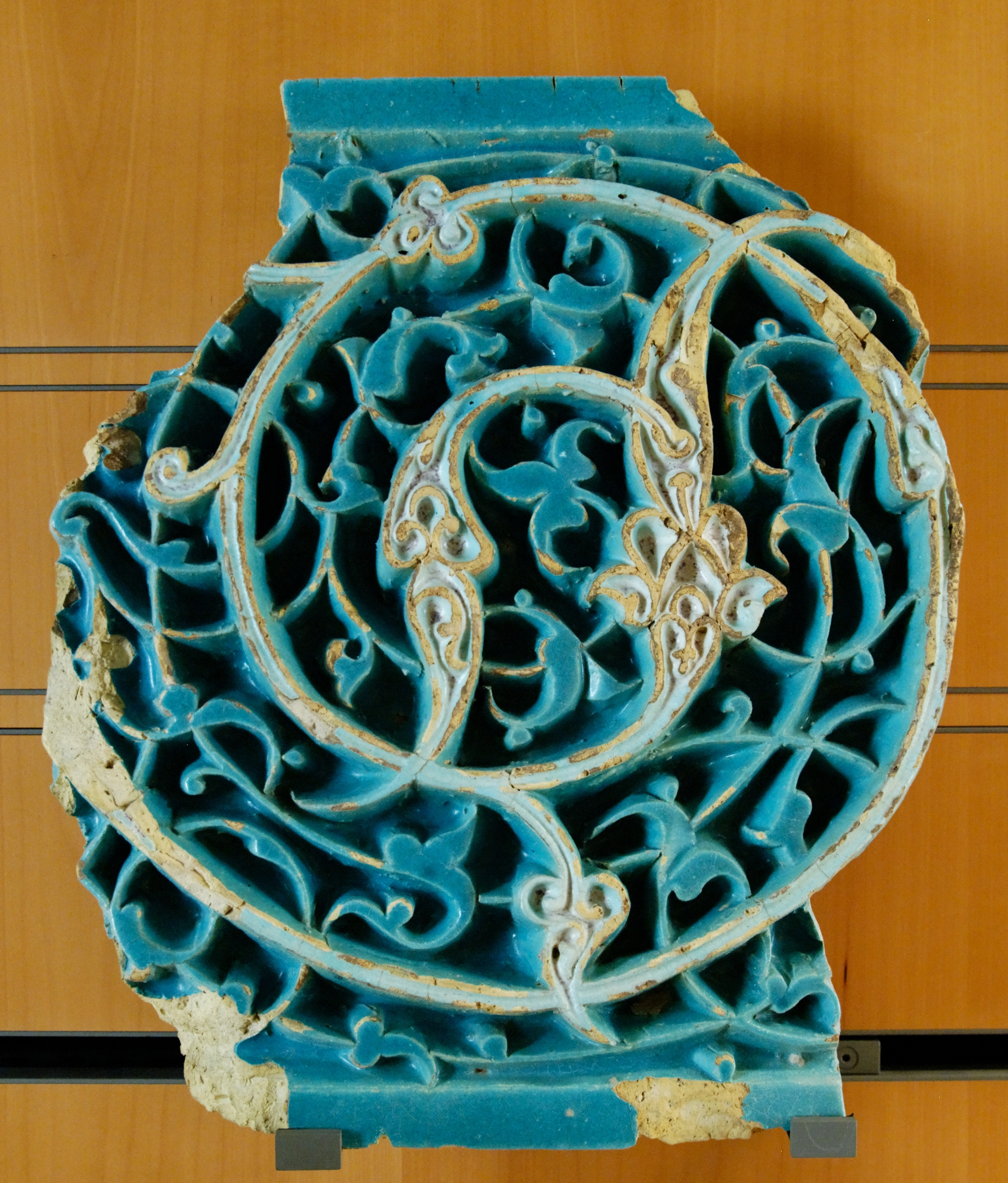
A fragment of Timurid Architecture made ca. 1375-1400, ceramic, stone paste; painted underglaze.

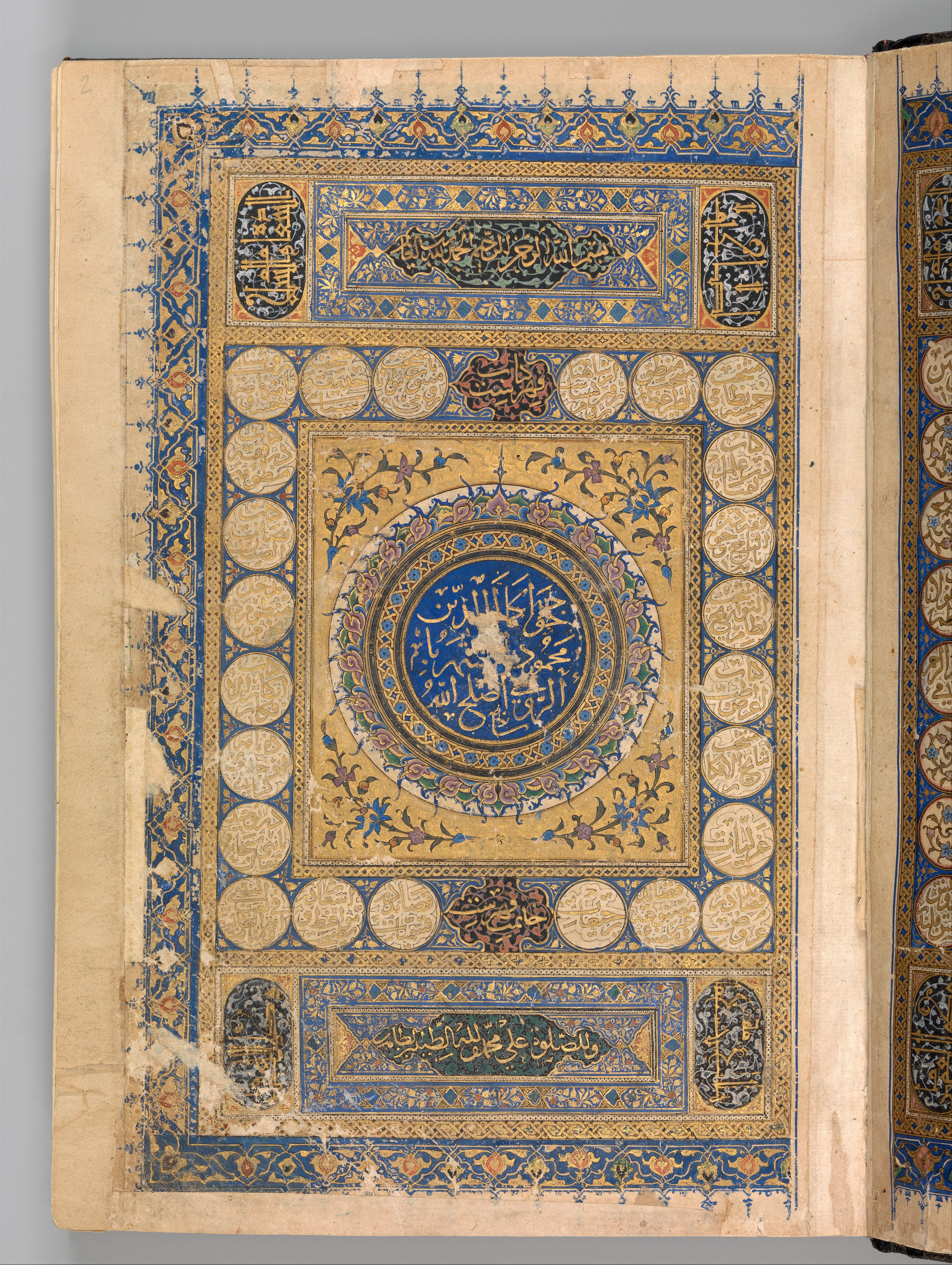
A page from Anthology of Persian Poetry 15th Century, made of ink, gold leaf, opaque watercolor, silver leaf, book bound by leather.

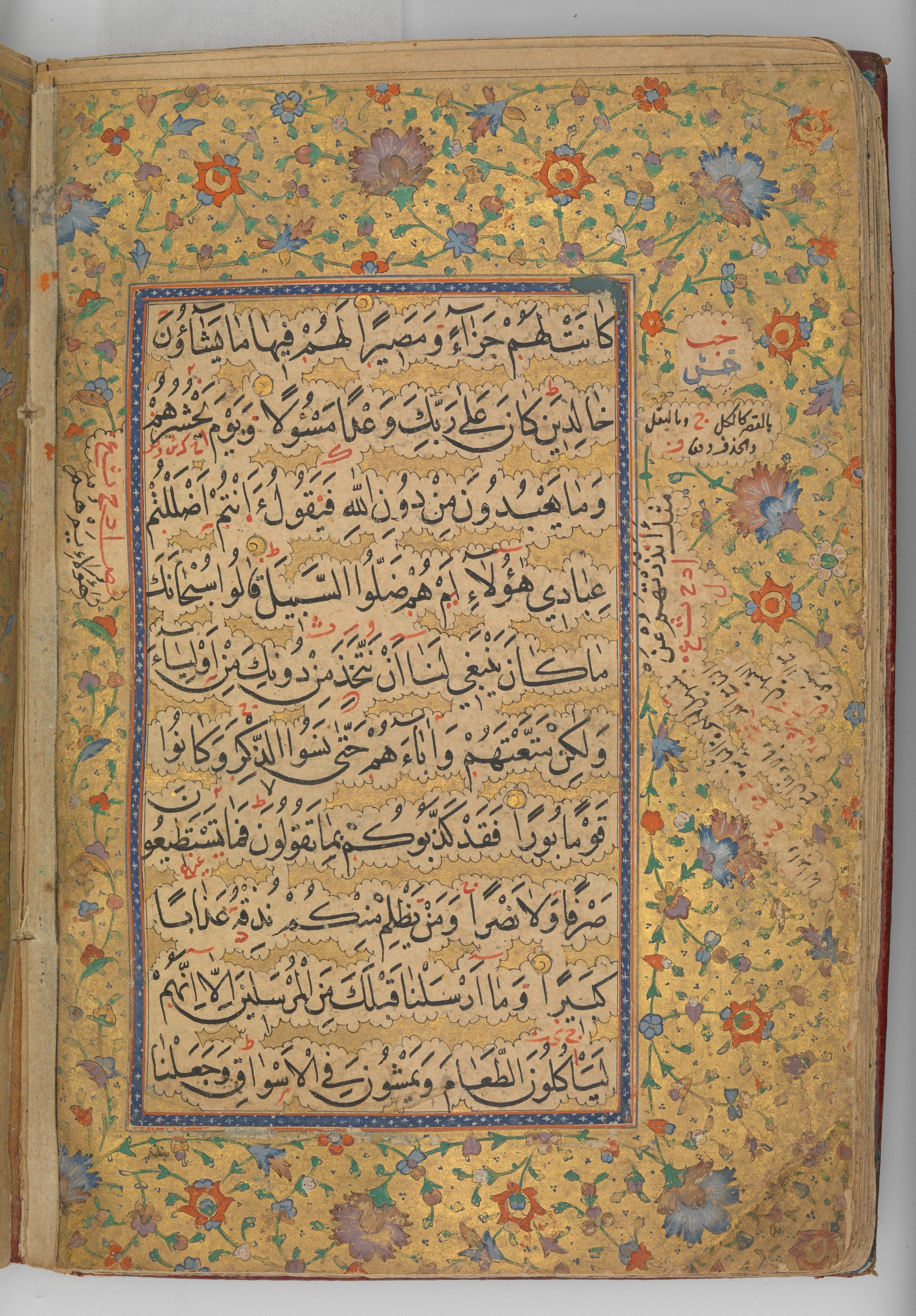
A page from the Qur’an of Ibrahim Sultan, made by Ibrahim Sultan, ca. 1427, watercolor, ink, gold leaf on paper.

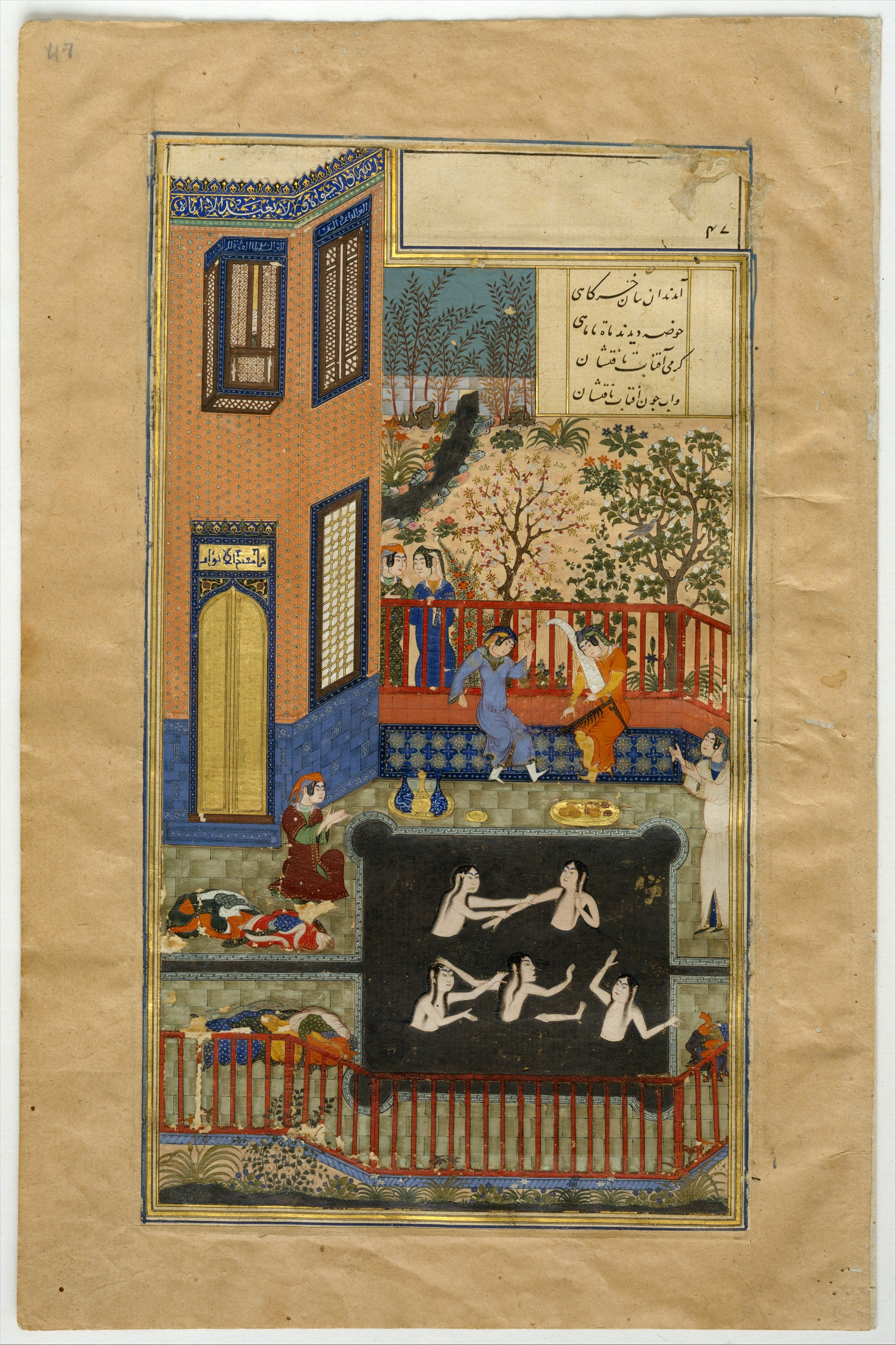
A page from "The Eavesdropper", Folio 47r from a Haft Paikar (Seven Portraits) of the Khamsa (Quintet) of Nizami, Calligrapher: Maulana Azhar, Poet: Nizami Ganjavi, ca. 1430, watercolor, ink, gold leaf on paper.

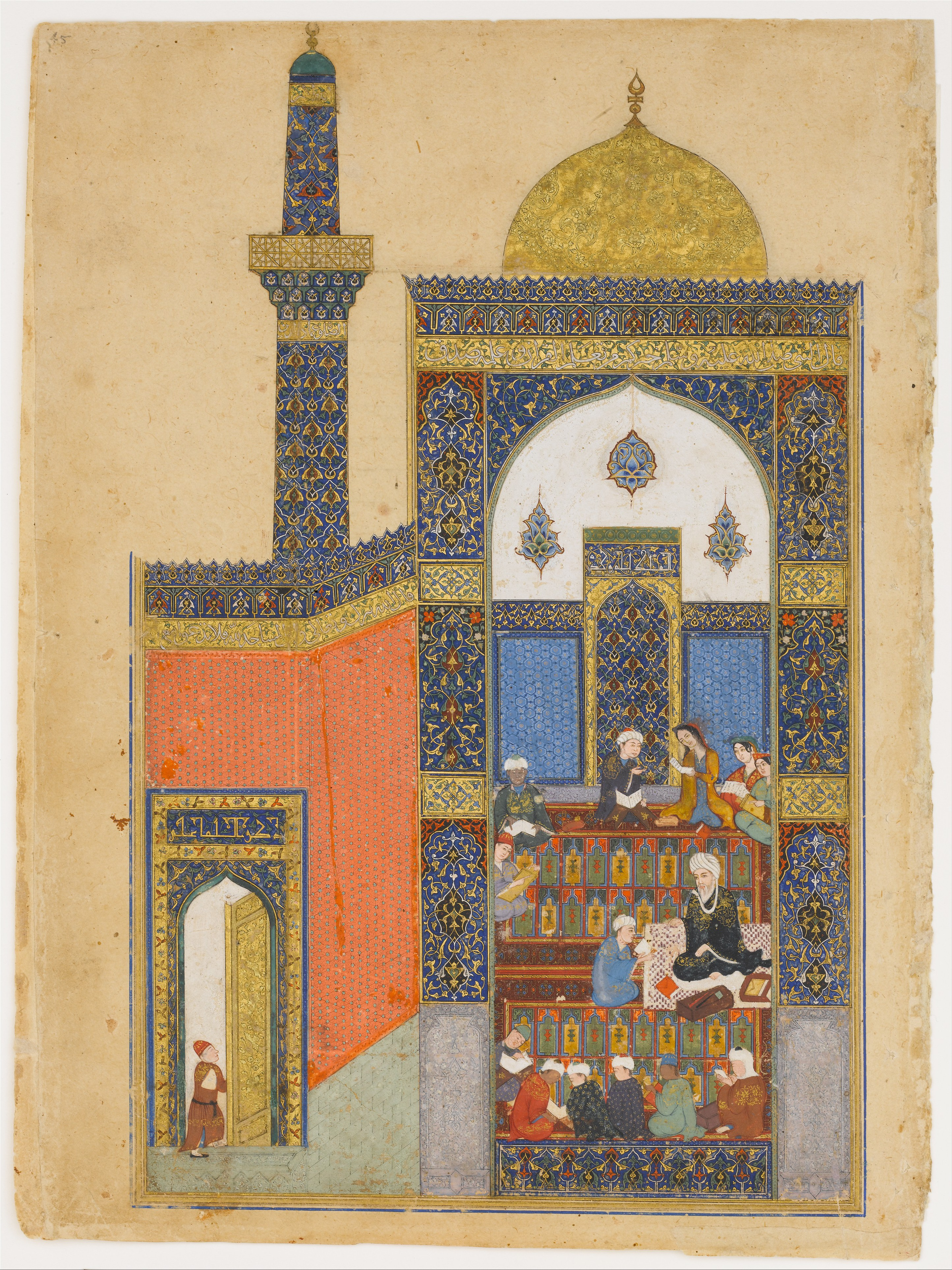
A page from "Laila and Majnun at School", Folio from a Khamsa (Quintet) of Nizami, Calligrapher: Ja'far Baisunghuri, Author: Nizami Ganjavi; 1431-1432, watercolor, ink, gold leaf on paper. Commissioned by Sultan Baysongor Khan.

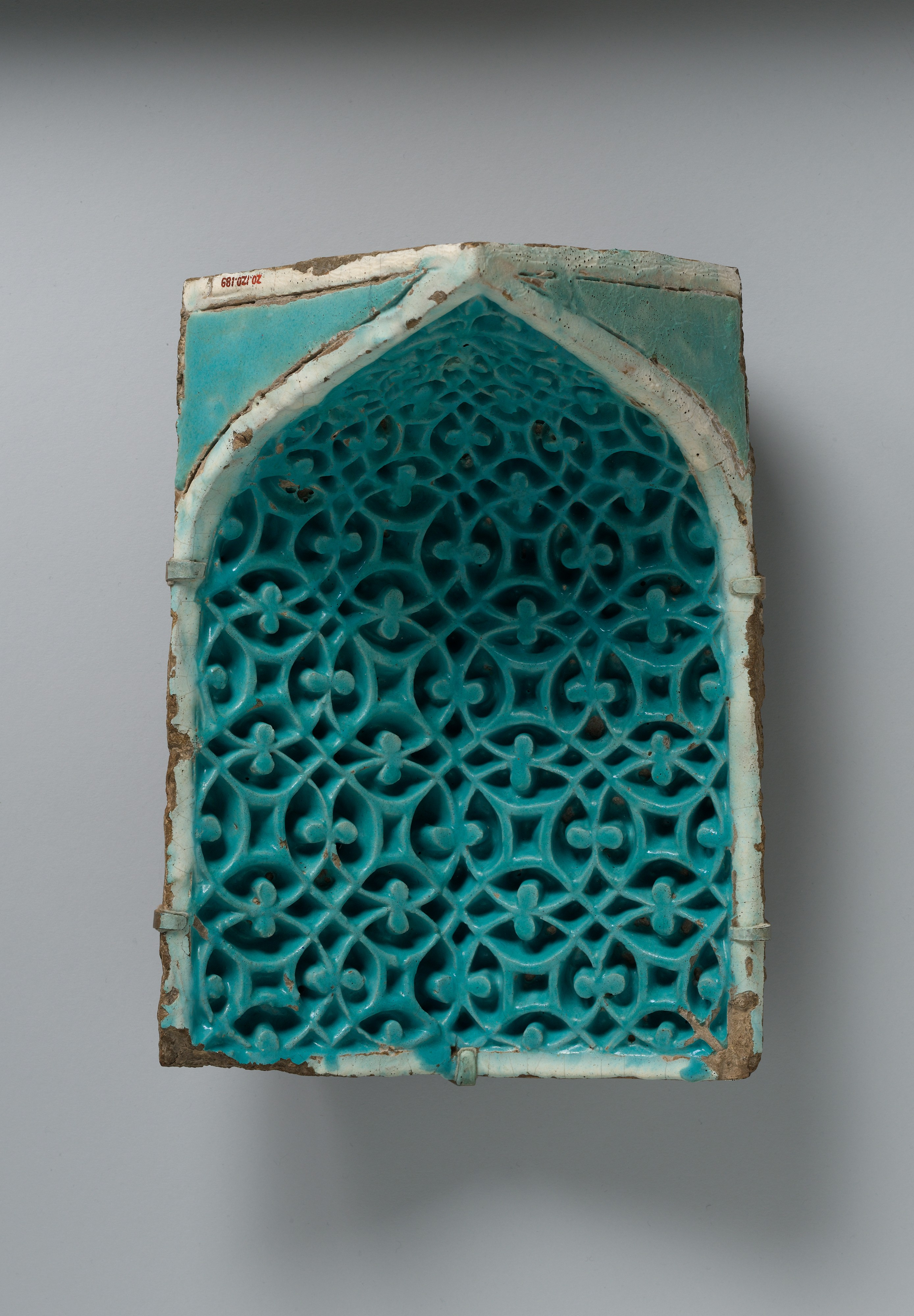
Tile from a Squinch, late 14th century, stone paste carved and glazed.

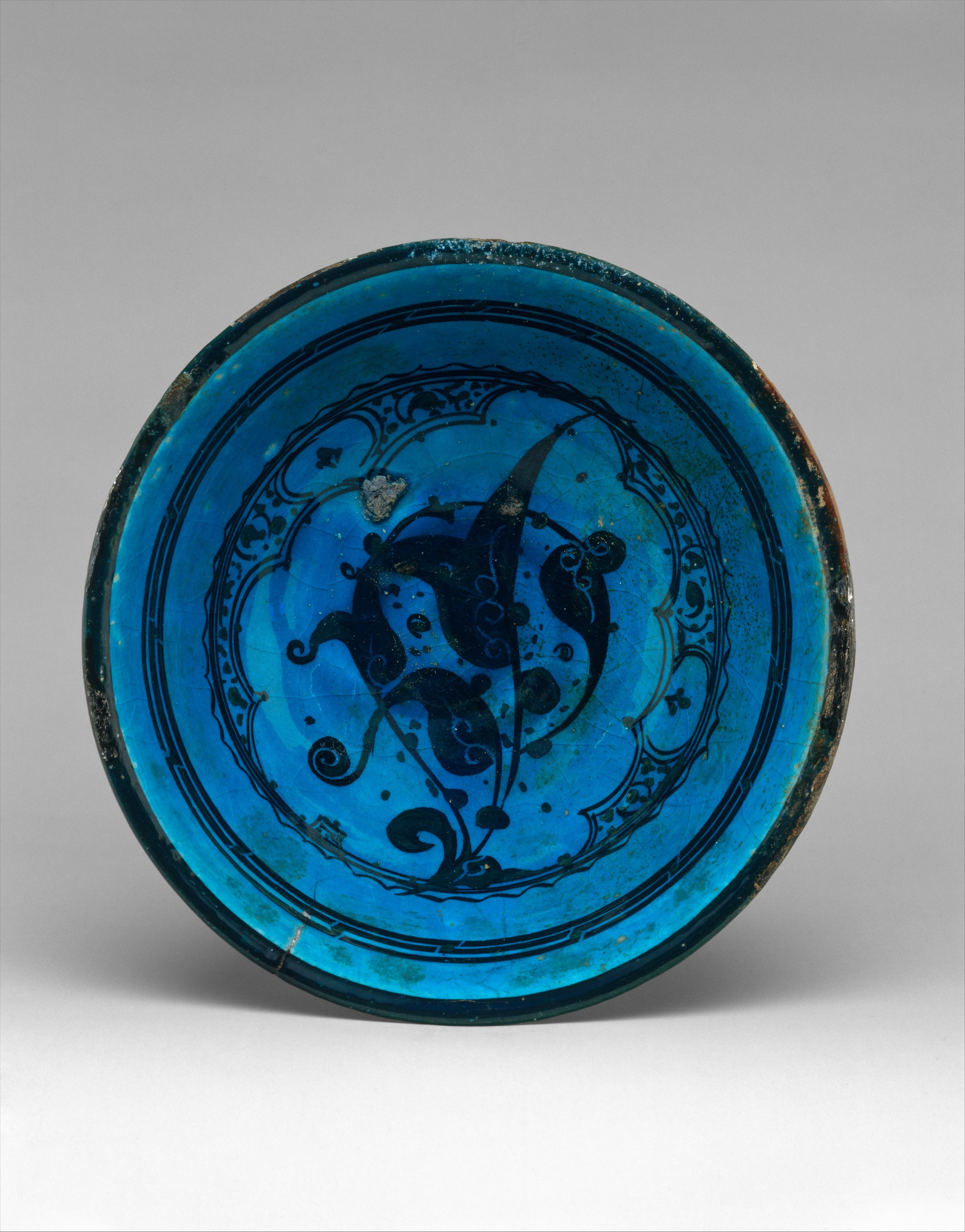
A bowl, late 15th century, black paint under turquoise glaze, incised.

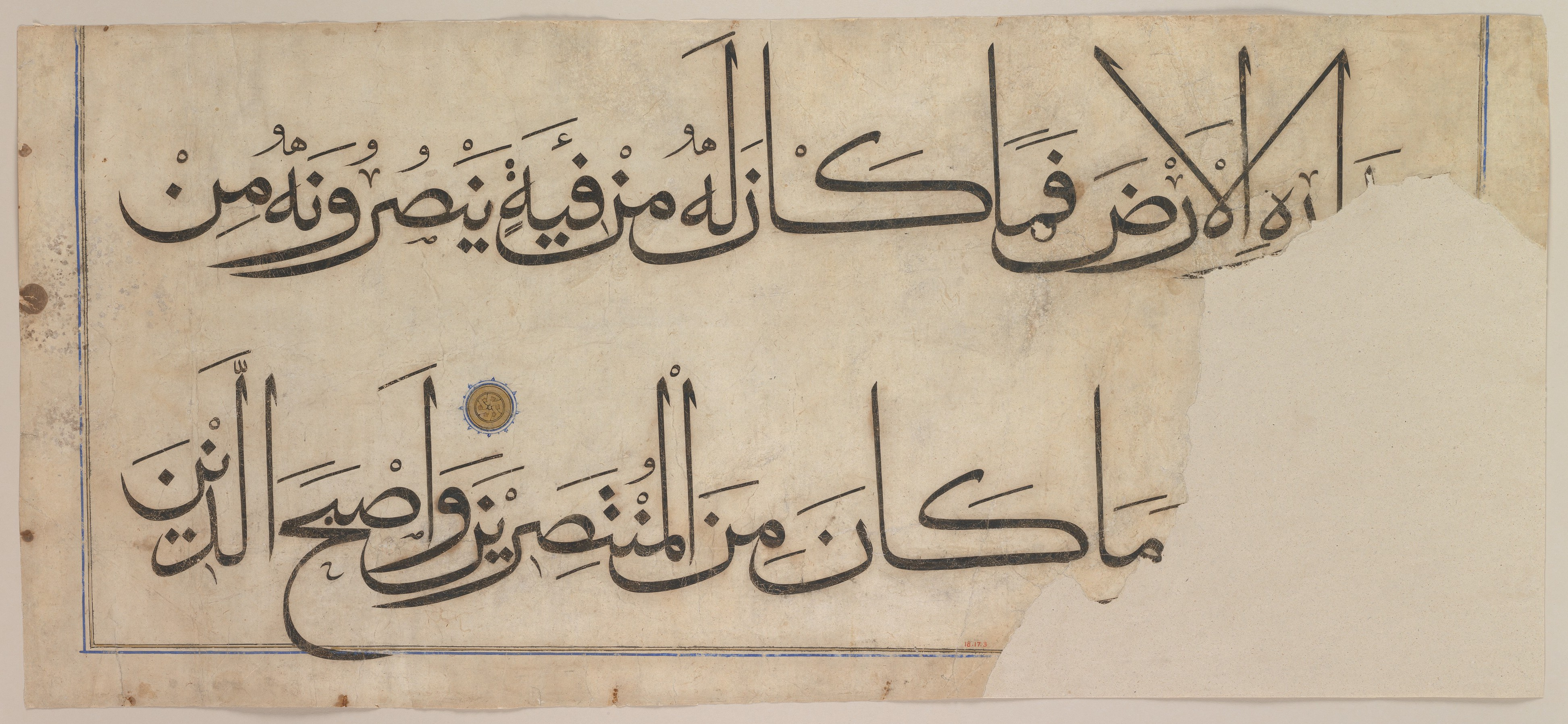
Section of a Qur'an Manuscript, Calligrapher: Copied by `Umar Aqta', late 14th century, watercolor, ink, gold leaf on paper.

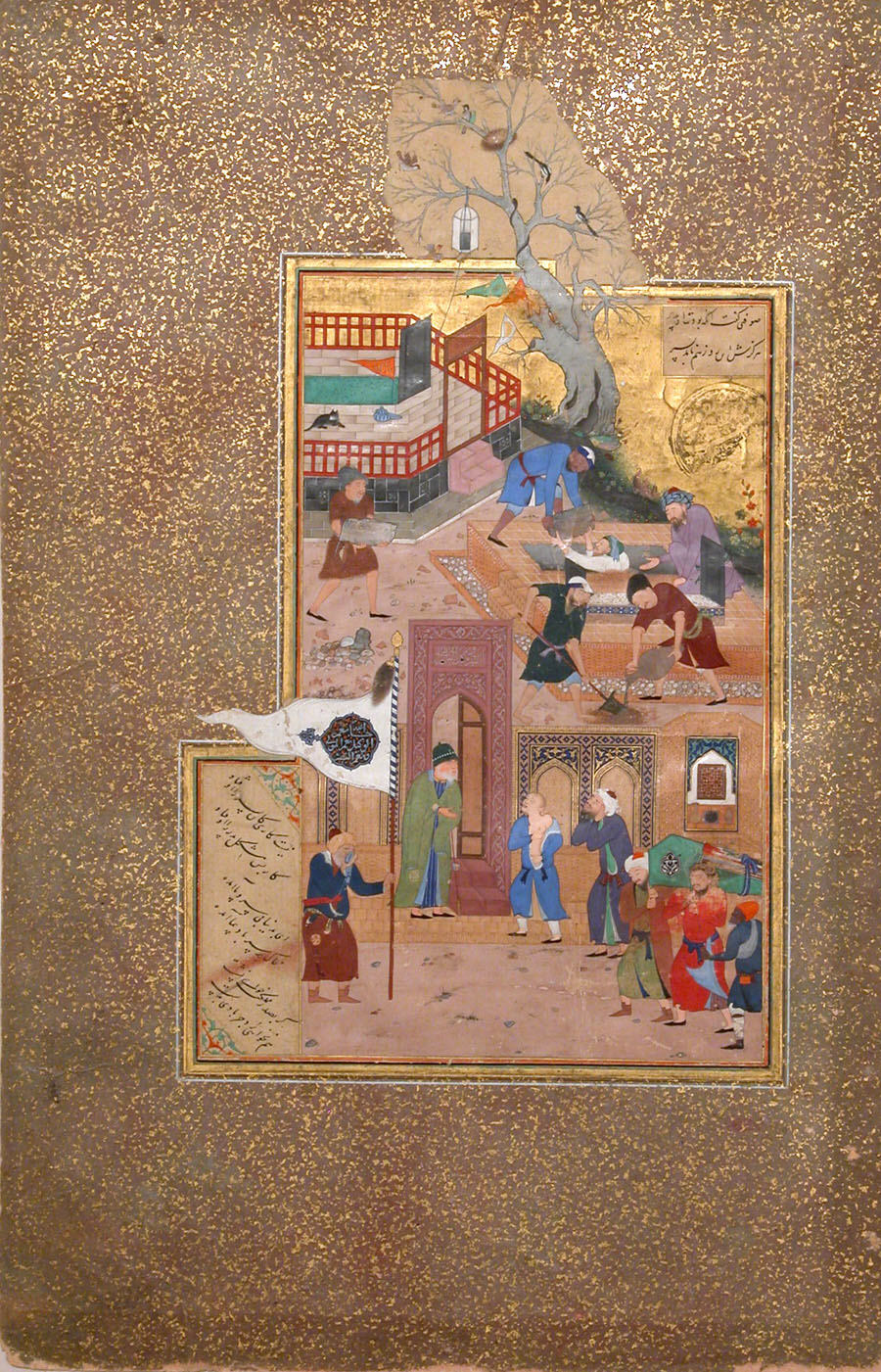
A folio from "Funeral Procession", Folio 35r from a Mantiq al-tair (Language of the Birds), Calligrapher: Sultan 'Ali al-Mashhadi, Author: Farid al-Din `Attar; 1487, watercolor, ink, gold and silver leaf on paper.

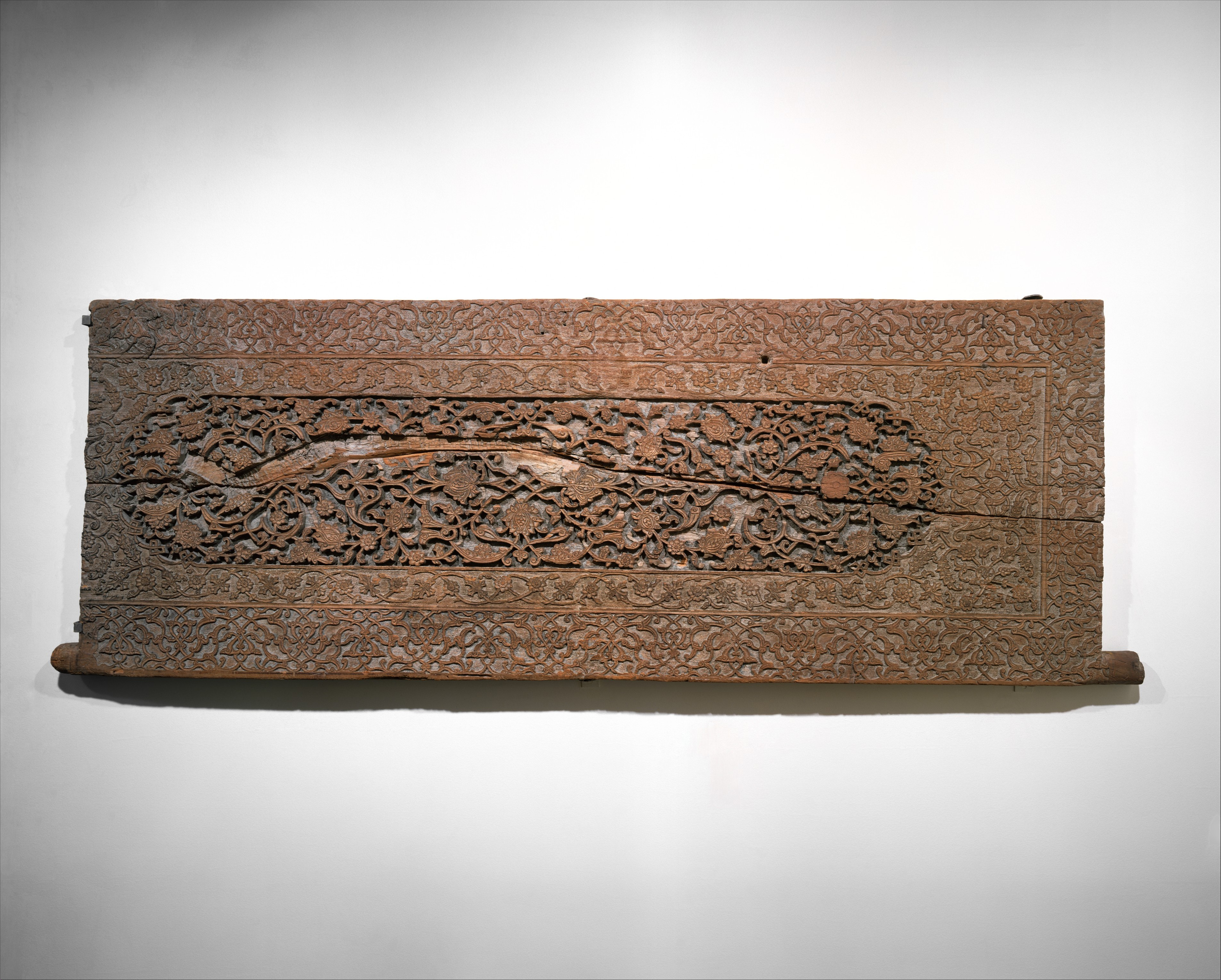
Carved Door Panellate 15th century, made in present-day Uzbekistan, Samarqand, made of cypress, carved, painted.

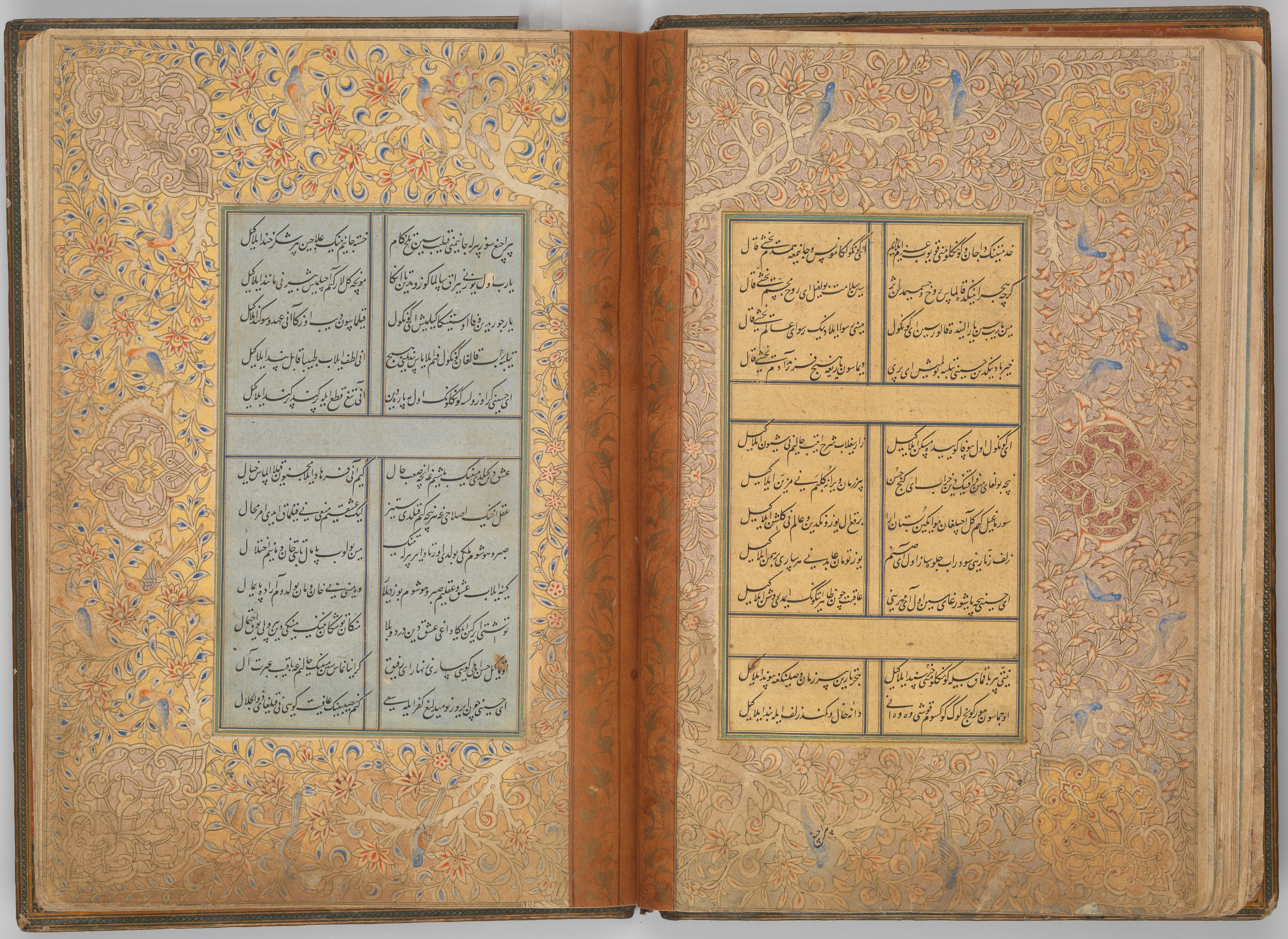
Divan of Sultan Husayn Bayqara, dated A.H. 905/ A.D. 1500, watercolor, ink, gold leaf on paper.
