= As Mãos =

As Mãos - Best of

Greatest hits album by António Pinho Vargas
- Released: 1998
- Genre: Jazz

António Pinho Vargas chronology
A Luz e a Escuridão (1996)	As Mãos - Best of (1998)	Versos (2001)

As Mãos is the eighth album by the Portuguese music composer António Pinho Vargas. It was released in 1998.

== Track listing ==
No.	Title	Length
1.	"As Mãos" (piano solo)
2.	"Tom Waits"
3.	"A Dança dos Pássaros"
4.	"Vilas Morenas"
5.	"Valsa"
6.	"June"
7.	"La Corazón"
8.	"De Longe"
9.	"Da Floresta"
10.	"Jardim do Passeio Alegre" (quartet)
