= Perigeo =

Italian progressive rock band

- Origin: Rome, Italy
- Genres: Jazz, jazz-rock, jazz fusion, progressive rock
- Years active: 1971–1977; 1980–1982
- Labels: RCA
- Past members: Giovanni Tommaso; Danilo Rea; Agostino Marangolo; Maurizio Giammarco; Carlo Pennisi; Franco D'Andrea; Bruno Biriaco; Claudio Fasoli

Perigeo are an Italian progressive rock group that released a group of albums for RCA Italiana in the 1970s. Several of the members went on to have long careers in jazz.

The group had subsequent editions under the names New Perigeo and Perigeo Special.

== Members ==
Perigeo

- Giovanni Tommaso (bass)
- Franco D'Andrea (keyboards)
- Bruno Biriaco (drums and percussion)
- Claudio Fasoli (saxophones)
- Tony Sidney (guitar)

New Perigeo

- Giovanni Tommaso (bass)
- Danilo Rea
- Agostino Marangolo
- Maurizio Giammarco (saxophone)
- Carlo Pennisi

== Discography ==
=== Perigeo ===
- 1972 Azimut
- 1973 Abbiamo tutti un blues da piangere
- 1974 Genealogia
- 1975 La valle dei templi
- 1975 Live at Montreaux (Live)
- 1976 Non è poi così lontano
- 1976 Live in Italy 1976 (Live)
- 1977 Attraverso il Perigeo (Raccolta)
- 1977 Fata Morgana (LP, Album) (RCA Victor)

=== Perigeo Special ===
- 1980 Alice

=== New Perigeo ===
- 1981 Q Concert (EP)
- 1981 Effetto amore
