= Os Jogos do Mundo =

Studio album by António Pinho Vargas
- Released: 1989
- Genre: Jazz

António Pinho Vargas chronology
As Folhas Novas Mudam de Cor (1987)	Os Jogos do Mundo (1989)	Selos e borboletas (1991)

Os Jogos do Mundo is the fourth album by the Portuguese music composer António Pinho Vargas. It was released in 1989.

== Personnel ==
- António Pinho Vargas - piano
- José Nogueira - alto saxophone and soprano saxophone
- Pedro Barreiros - double bass
- Mário Barreiros - drums
- Quico - synthesizers
- Rui Júnior - tablas and percussion instruments
