= Claudio Fasoli =

Italian jazz saxophonist and composer

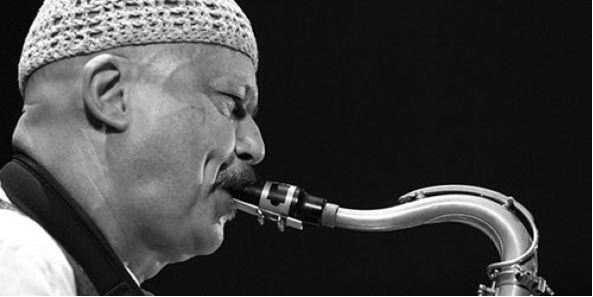
Claudio Fasoli

Claudio Fasoli (born 29 November 1939) is an Italian jazz - saxophonist (tenor and soprano saxophone) and composer of modern jazz.

== Music career ==
In 2017, Claudio Fasoli's book "Inner sounds. In the orbit of jazz and free music", published by Agenzia X. The forewords are by philosopher Massimo Donà, musicologist Carlo Boccadoro, and Franco Caroni, president of Siena Jazz; the book also contains many other contributions, including those by Ashley Kahn, Stefano Zenni, and Flavio Caprera (in 2020 the second expanded and updated edition came out).

In 2010 he created the project "Inner Sound Of Seven Hours" for quartet with voice, inspired by fragments from "HorÆ CanonicÆ" by Wystan Hugh Auden. Nat Hentoff, one of America's leading music critics, wrote of him, "What strikes me most about Claudio Fasoli is the clarity and individuality of the narrative; he really 'speaks' with his horns, his reeds. One cannot confuse him with anyone else. He plays with an intensity of feeling - from reflection to exultation - that has a powerful immediacy. There is no ostentation, he does not play notes without a story connecting them. Then there is Fasoli the composer. His writing has a distinguishable form. His lines are clear and strong, and he knows the expressive value of leaving room for breath, for interval."

In 2018, a referendum held by the magazine "Musica Jazz" (n.806, January 2018) among music critics awarded Claudio Fasoli as Musician of the Year.

In the film "Voices" (awarded in over twenty international festivals), director Alberto Nacci dedicates one of the portraits to Claudio Fasoli.

In 2018 the film Claudio Fasoli's Innersounds by Angelo Poli and Carlodavid Mauri is also released. Written by Angelo Poli and Marc Tibaldi. Directed by Angelo Poli. Music by Claudio Fasoli. The film is a journey into the creative processes of jazz musician Claudio Fasoli, a journey in stages, an intimate and unedited black and white portrait. Fasoli's voice reveals his thoughts as he speaks directly to each individual viewer and helps us to enter the evolution of the creative process, and its key concepts such as time, improvisation, silence, subtraction, risk, unpredictability. The film follows the entire process of creation of a new composition by Claudio Fasoli: idea, composition, sharing with the group, improvisation. The composition and the chords drawn on the piano, played with the sax, the musical arrangement with the Quintet in the rehearsal room, up to the live performance. The editing is marked by the absolute respect of Claudio's music, for this reason "Claudio Fasoli's Innersounds" as well as being a portrait of a great of jazz, aspires to be in itself a true jazz film. The film was awarded Best International Documentary at Västerås Film Festival 2018, Prisma International Film Festival, Parma Film Festival, and other international festivals, including: Short Sounds Film Festival, Bournemout; Doc'n Roll Film Festival, London; Sonic Scene Music Film Fest, Trani; The Summershort Filmfestival, Munich.

In January 2022, the historic magazine "Musica Jazz" awarded "Next" (Abeat records) as the best cd of 2021.

=== Trios and quartets ===
When Perigeo disbanded in 1978, he became leader of his own groups, putting together mostly trios or quartets, with Aldo Romano, Bill Elgart, Bobo Stenson, Henri Texier, Jean-François Jenny Clark, Kenny Wheeler, Lee Konitz, Manfred Schoof, Mick Goodrick, Palle Danielsson, and Tony Oxley.

He introduced his own compositions in concerts and festivals around the world. In addition to his native Italy, he has performed in France, Switzerland, Yugoslavia, Poland, Germany, Holland, Belgium, Spain, Finland, Luxembourg, Denmark, Sweden, England, Ireland, Canada, Mexico, Cuba, and the United States.

== Discography ==
=== As leader ===
- 1978 Eskimo Fakiro Trio & Quartet with F. D'andrea, B. Biriaco And G. Azzolini (Curci)
- 1978 Jazz Duo with Franco D'andrea Critics Award (Dire)
- 1980 Hinterland with E. Pieranunzi, R. Gatto, B. Tommaso (Edipan)
- 1981 The Meeting with P. La Barbera (Dire)
- 1982 Cloudy Live with L. Bonafede (FonitCetra)
- 1983 Lido with K. Drew, B. Altschul, N.-H. Ø. Pedersen (Soul Note)
- 1984 Input with A. Faraò (Bull)
- 1987 Welcome with K. Wheeler, D. Humair, J.-F. J. Clark (Soul Note)
- 1987 For Once with H. Kramer, M. Vaggi, P. Leveratto, G. Cazzola (Splasc(H))
- 1988 Egotrip (Splasc(H))
- 1990 Bodies with M. Goodrick, P. Danielsson, T. Oxley (Nueva)
- 1990 Land with K. Wheeler, J.-F. J. Clark (Nueva)
- 1993 Cities with M. Goodrick, P. Dallaporta, B. Elgart (Ram)
- 1994 Guest Fasoli Conducts the European Music Orch. Guests K. Wheeler & A. Romano (Soul Note)
- 199394 Trois Trios with H. Texier, A. Romano, J. Clayton, M. Goodrick (Splasc(H))
- 1994 Mirror with S. Battaglia, J. Clayton (Ram)
- 1995 Ten Tributes with K. Wheeler, M. Goodrick, B. Elgart, H. Texier (Ram)
- 1996 Icon with E. Rava, F. D'andrea (Flex)
- 1998 Esteem Experience with M. Gassmann, P. Dallaporta, G. Bertoncini (Flex)
- 2000 Résumé with P. Birro, Experience with M. Gassmann, P. Dalla Porta, G. Bertoncini, Nonet with R. Bonati, M. Negri, A. Tacchini, R. Migliardi, M. Castagna, G. Distefano, Arr. &Cond. R. Brazzale (Musica Jazz, July 2000) (Rusconi)
- 2002 Gammatrio with Rudy Migliardi & Paolo Birro (Map)
- 2003 Stilla with Rudy Migliardi & Paolo Birro (Soul Note)
- 2003 Mazurka Lydian Sound Orch. Cond. R. Brazzale & Claudio Fasoli (Abeat)
- 2005 Episod with Rudy Migliardi & Paolo Birro (Velut Luna)
- 2006 Adagio with Paolo Birro & Marco Micheli (Alma)
- 2007 Infant Eyes Lee Konitz Meets Claudio Fasoli with P. Birro, A. Tavolazzi, S. Bagnoli (The Music Of Wayne Shorter) (Philology)
- 2007 Promenade with M. Zara, Y. Goloubev, M. Zanoli (Comar 23)
- 2009 Venice Inside with M. Zara, Y. Goloubev, M. Zanoli (Blueserge)
- 2010 Reflections with M. Zara, Y. Goloubev, M. Zanoli (Blueserge)
- 2011 Avenir M. Calgaro, L. Calgaro, G. Bertoncini) (Caligola)
- 2012 Duology Claudio Fasoli & Luca Garlaschelli Duo (Radiosnj)
- 2012 Patchwork (Caligola)
- 2014 London Tube (Abeat)
- 2015 The Brooklyn Option (Musica Jazz)
- 2016 - INNER SOUNDS "Claudio Fasoli Double Quartet" M.Gassman, M.Calgaro, M.Decorato, A.Lamacchia, L.Calgaro, M.Zanoli, G.Bertoncini (Abeat)
- 2017 - HAIKU TIME "Claudio Fasoli Samandhi quintet" w.M.Gassman, M.Decorato, A.Lamacchia, M.Zanoli (Abeat)
- 2018 - SELFIE "Claudio Fasoli New York Quartet" (Abeat)
- 2019 - THE BROOKLYN OPTION Claudio Fasoli - tenor & soprano sax • Ralph Alessi - trumpet, Matt Mitchell - piano, Drew Gress - double bass, Nasheet Waits - drums (Abeat)
- 2021 - NEXT Claudio Fasoli - tenor & soprano sax • Tito Mangialajo Rantzer double bass, Simone Massaron - guitar, electronics, Stefano Grasso - drums (Abeat)

=== As sideman ===
- 1971 Live Suite G. Manusardi Quartet (MPS/BASF)
- 1972 Azimut Perigeo (RCA)
- 1973 Abbiamo Tutti... Perigeo (RCA)
- 1974 Genealogia Perigeo (RCA)
- 1975 La Valle Dei Templi Perigeo (RCA)
- 1977 Non È Poi Così... Perigeo (RCA)
- 1977 Perigeo Special Perigeo (RCA)
- 1973–76 Attraverso Il Perigeo Perigeo (RCA)
- 1990 Multipli G. Gaslini Quintet (Soul Note)
- 1991 Masks G. Gaslini Quintet (Soul Note)
- 1992 From South to North G. Emmanuele Orchestra:Guests P. Fresu, E. Rava, C. Fasoli, P. Tonolo (Avarts)
- 1993 Melodious Thunk Lydian Sound Orchestra, Conductor R. Brazzale (Totem)
- 1993 Live in Montreux Perigeo (BMG)
- 2000 Live Grande Orch.naz. Cond. G.gaslini (Soul Note)
- 2000 L' Essenza F. Faraò / C. Fasoli W.L. Bonafede, R. Cecchetto, A. Tacchini (Splasc(H))
