= Cores e Aromas =

Studio album by António Pinho Vargas
- Released: 1985
- Genre: Jazz

António Pinho Vargas chronology
Outros Lugares (1983)	Cores e Aromas (1985)	As Folhas Novas Mudam de Cor (1987)

Cores e Aromas is the second album by the Portuguese music composer António Pinho Vargas. It was released in 1985.

== Track listing ==
No.	Title	Length
1.	"Dança dos Pássaros"
2.	"Gente Estranha"
3.	"Olhos Molhados"
4.	"Valsa"
5.	"Da Alma"
6.	"Atmosfera" (dedicado a John Coltrane)
7.	"Fim de Tarde"
8.	"Cores e Aromas"

== Personnel ==
- António Pinho Vargas - piano
- José Nogueira - saxophone
- Pedro Barreiros - double bass
- Mário Barreiros - drums
