= Solo (António Pinho Vargas album) =

Studio album by António Pinho Vargas
- Released: 2008
- Recorded: CCB's small auditorium
- Genre: Jazz

António Pinho Vargas chronology
Os Dias Levantados (2003)	Solo (2008)	Solo II (2009)

Solo is the eleventh album by the Portuguese music composer António Pinho Vargas. It was released in 2008.

== Track listing ==
Disc one
No.	Title	Length
1.	"Brinquedos"
2.	"Tom Waits"
3.	"Dança Dos Pássaros"
4.	"Fado Negro"
5.	"Alentejo, Alentejo"
6.	"Quedas D'água" (Com Lágrimas)
7.	"General Complex"
8.	"Poslúdio De General Complex"
9.	"La Corazon: Lento"
10.	"La Corazon: Rápido"
11.	"Funerais"

Disc two
No.	Title	Length
1.	"Casa De Granito No Minho"
2.	"Prelude To June" (Tabor)
3.	"June"
4.	"Vilas Morenas"
5.	"Poslúdio De Vilas Morenas"
6.	"As Mãos"
7.	"Cantiga Para Amigos"
8.	"Dinky Toys" (Prelúdio)
9.	"Dinky Toys"
10.	"Fugato Para Lindo Ramo"
11.	"Lindo Ramo, Verde Escuro"
12.	"O Movimento Parado Das Árvores"
13.	"Obscura, Nebulosa"

== Personnel ==
- António Pinho Vargas - piano
