= Solo 3: Woods =

Studio album by Franco D'Andrea
- Recorded: April 2001
- Genre: Jazz
- Label: Philology

Solo 3: Woods is a solo piano album by Franco D'Andrea. It was recorded in 2001 and released by Philology Records.

== Recording and music ==
Material for this and seven other solo piano CDs was recorded over the period of three mornings and two afternoons in April 2001. The compositions are mainly by saxophonist Phil Woods. The exception is "Abstractly for Phil", by D'Andrea. The playing on "Banja Luka" contains elements of Thelonious Monk.

== Release and reception ==
Professional ratings
Review scores
Source	Rating
AllMusic	4/5 stars
The Penguin Guide to Jazz	3/4 stars

Solo 3 was released by Philology Records. The AllMusic reviewer reported that "Woods was very pleased with the results and his fans should be as well. "

== Track listing ==
1. "Ode a Jean Louis / My Man Benny / Gar's Waltz"
2. "Banja Luka / But George"
3. "The Stanley Stomper / Pairing Off / House of Chan"
4. "Gar's Waltz"
5. "Cool Aid"
6. "Sol's Olli / Sea Beach"
7. "Abstraction for Phil"

== Personnel ==
- Franco D'Andrea – piano
