= Solo (surname) =

Solo is the surname of:

== People ==
- Bobby Solo (born 1945), Italian singer, musician and film actor
- Ed Solo, British disc jockey and record producer
- Hope Solo (born 1981), American soccer goalkeeper
- Krsna Solo, Indian composer, singer-songwriter and music producer
- Ksenia Solo (born 1987), Latvian-Canadian actress
- Mano Solo (1963–2010), French singer
- Manolo Solo or Manuel Fernández Serrano (born 1964), Spanish actor
- Methaneilie Solo (born 1955), Naga singer and composer
- Neba Solo or Souleymane Traoré (born 1969), Malian musician
- Pam Solo (born 1946), arms control analyst
- Sal Solo (born 1961), English singer
- Simon Solo (born 1961), Papua New Guinea politician

== Characters ==
- Han Solo, from the Star Wars films
- Ben Solo, from the Star Wars films
  - Solo family, relatives of Han in the Star Wars Expanded Universe
- Napoleon Solo, in the American TV series The Man from U.N.C.L.E.
