= Solo (restaurant) =

Coordinates: 51°49′45.34″N 4°58′24.4″E

- Interactive map of Solo

Restaurant information
- Established: 2007
- Closed: 2014
- Head chef: Gerrit van den Berg
- Food type: French, Mediterranean
- Rating: Michelin Guide
- Location: Zusterhuis 1 - 2, Gorinchem, 4201 EH, Netherlands
- Seating capacity: 40
- Website: Official website

Solo is a defunct restaurant in Gorinchem, Netherlands. It was a fine dining restaurant that was awarded one Michelin star in 2007 and retained that rating until 2012. On 2 September 2014 it was made known that the restaurant had closed down.

The head chef of Solo in the period of the Michelin star was Mohammed el Harouchi. After his accident, sous chef Gerrit van den Berg took over.

The restaurant lost its star due to the severe accident of head chef El Harouchi, in which he suffered a contusion of the brain stem. There was no shock or confusion among staff, as everybody expected to lose the star due to the long absence of the head chef.

The Dutch-Moroccan background of El Harouchi reflected in his cooking, which was in the basic French style but with Moroccan influences, herbs and tastes.

== See also ==
- List of Michelin starred restaurants in the Netherlands
