= Solo 4: Gato =

Studio album by Franco D'Andrea
- Recorded: April 2001
- Genre: Jazz
- Label: Philology

Solo 4: Gato is a solo piano album by Franco D'Andrea. It was recorded in 2001 and released by Philology Records.

== Recording and music ==
Material for this and seven other solo piano CDs was recorded over the period of three mornings and two afternoons in April 2001. The compositions are mainly by saxophonist Gato Barbieri. He and D'Andrea had recorded together in 1964–65.

== Release and reception ==
Professional ratings
Review scores
Source	Rating
AllMusic	3/5 stars
The Penguin Guide to Jazz	3/4 stars

Solo 3 was released by Philology Records. The AllMusic reviewer preferred the first three Solo albums, but noted that "D'Andrea's infectious playing also makes Solo 4 well worth acquiring".

== Track listing ==
1. "La Vuelta / Last Tango in Paris"
2. "Merceditas / Ninos / It's Over"
3. "Jeanne"
4. "El Parana / Un Lago Adios / Bolivia"
5. "Para Mi Negra"
6. "Abstraction for Gato"

== Personnel ==
- Franco D'Andrea – piano
