= Solo 5: Duke =

2001 album by Franco D'Andrea

Studio album by Franco D'Andrea
- Recorded: April 2001
- Genre: Jazz
- Label: Philology

Solo 5: Duke is a solo piano album by Franco D'Andrea. Consisting mainly of performances of early Duke Ellington compositions, the album was recorded in 2001 and released by Philology Records.

== Recording and music ==
Material for this and seven other solo piano CDs was recorded over the period of three mornings and two afternoons in April 2001. The compositions are mainly by Duke Ellington, from the 1920s to the early 1940s. The performance of "Caravan" "starts in the middle of the theme and incorporates unusual chord substitutions with a touch of playfulness", thereby having some reminders of Jaki Byard's style.

== Release and reception ==
Professional ratings
Review scores
Source	Rating
AllMusic	4.5/5 stars
The Penguin Guide to Jazz	3.5/4 stars

Solo 5 was released by Philology Records. The Penguin Guide to Jazz wrote: "though it looks like an unpromisingly hackneyed choice of tunes, D'Andrea's approach is particularly bright and craftily inventive." The AllMusic reviewer concluded that "This is easily one of the most impressive salutes to Duke Ellington by a solo pianist that you could ever run across."

== Track listing ==
1. "Take the 'A' Train / Perdido"
2. "I Got It Bad and That Ain't Good / It Don't Mean a Thing If It Ain't Got That Swing / I'm Beginning to See the Light"
3. "Caravan"
4. "In a Sentimental Mood / Just Squeeze Me / Sophisticated Lady"
5. "The Mooche"
6. "Prelude to a Kiss"
7. "Satin Doll"
8. "Solitude"

== Personnel ==
- Franco D'Andrea – piano
