= Solo II =

Studio album by António Pinho Vargas
- Released: 2009
- Genre: Jazz

António Pinho Vargas chronology
Solo (2008)	Solo II (2009)	Concerto no IST - Improvisações (2011)

Solo II is the twelfth album by the Portuguese music composer António Pinho Vargas. It was released in 2009. It was later presented with the José Afonso 2010 award.

== Track listing ==
Disc one
No.	Title	Length
1.	"Twins' Peak"	2:53
2.	"Que Amor Não Me Engana I"	2:32
3.	"Veado Ferido"	3:44
4.	"Olhos Molhados"	6:38
5.	"Da Floresta"	3:12
6.	"In Between T & O"	8:13
7.	"Do Teatro"	3:43
8.	"Águas Matinais Da Holanda"	5:53
9.	"Gente Estranha"	2:16
10.	"Poslúdio De Gente Estranha"	1:31
11.	"O Sentimento De Um Ocidental"	4:21
12.	"The Times They Are A-Changing"	2:19

Disc two
No.	Title	Length
1.	"Uma Já Antiga"	2:57
2.	"Franz"	2:59
3.	"Poslúdio De Franz"	2:12
4.	"A Incontornável Melancolia"	3:10
5.	"Jardim Do Passeio Alegre"	3:53
6.	"Cantiga Prá Maria"	4:18
7.	"Apesar De Tudo A Calma"	3:22
8.	"Thelonious Skizo Sketch"	5:45
9.	"Quatro Mulheres"	3:44
10.	"Que Amor Não Me Engana II"	4:24
11.	"Ornette"	0:50
12.	"Poslúdio De Ornette"	2:50
13.	"Da Alma: Lento"	2:00
14.	"Da Alma: Rápido"	4:46

== Personnel ==
- António Pinho Vargas - piano
