= Apogee (disambiguation) =

Apogee is a type of apsis: an extreme point in an object's orbit.

Apogee may also refer to:

== Companies ==
- Apogee Books, an imprint of Canadian publishing house Collector's Guide Publishing
- Apogee Electronics, a manufacturer of digital audio hardware systems
- Apogee Software, a video game publisher and developer now known as 3D Realms
- Apogee Entertainment, a video game publisher that acquired the rights to the name and logo from 3D Realms
- Apogee, Inc., a special effects company established by John Dykstra

== Fictional characters ==
- Apogee, a superhero from The Incredibles
- Talwyn Apogee, a character in the Ratchet & Clank series

== Music ==
- Apogee (Bongzilla album) (2000)
- Apogee (Pete Christlieb and Warne Marsh album) (1978)

== Other uses ==
- Apogee Stadium, an American football venue of the University of North Texas
- Apache Point Observatory Galactic Evolution Experiment, an astronomical survey

== See also ==
- Perigee (disambiguation)
