= Solo 7: Napoli =

Studio album by Franco D'Andrea
- Recorded: April 2001
- Genre: Jazz
- Label: Philology

Solo 7: Napoli is a solo piano album by Franco D'Andrea. It was recorded in 2001 and released by Philology Records.

== Recording and music ==
Material for this and seven other solo piano CDs was recorded over the period of three mornings and two afternoons in April 2001. The compositions are associated with Naples.

== Release and reception ==
Professional ratings
Review scores
Source	Rating
AllMusic	4/5 stars
The Penguin Guide to Jazz	2.5/4 stars

Solo 7 was released by Philology Records. The AllMusic reviewer wrote: "Because it's hard to judge improvisations when one hasn't heard the original works, this release ranks just a notch below the other seven volumes".

== Track listing ==
1. "Voce 'E Notte"
2. "Munasterio 'E Santa Chiara"
3. "Funiculì, Funiculà"
4. "O' Sole Mio"
5. "Reginella"
6. "Anema E Core"
7. "Resta Cu'mme"

== Personnel ==
- Franco D'Andrea – piano
