= Vinegar Lane =

Development in Auckland, New Zealand

Coordinates: 36.8588°S 174.7491°E

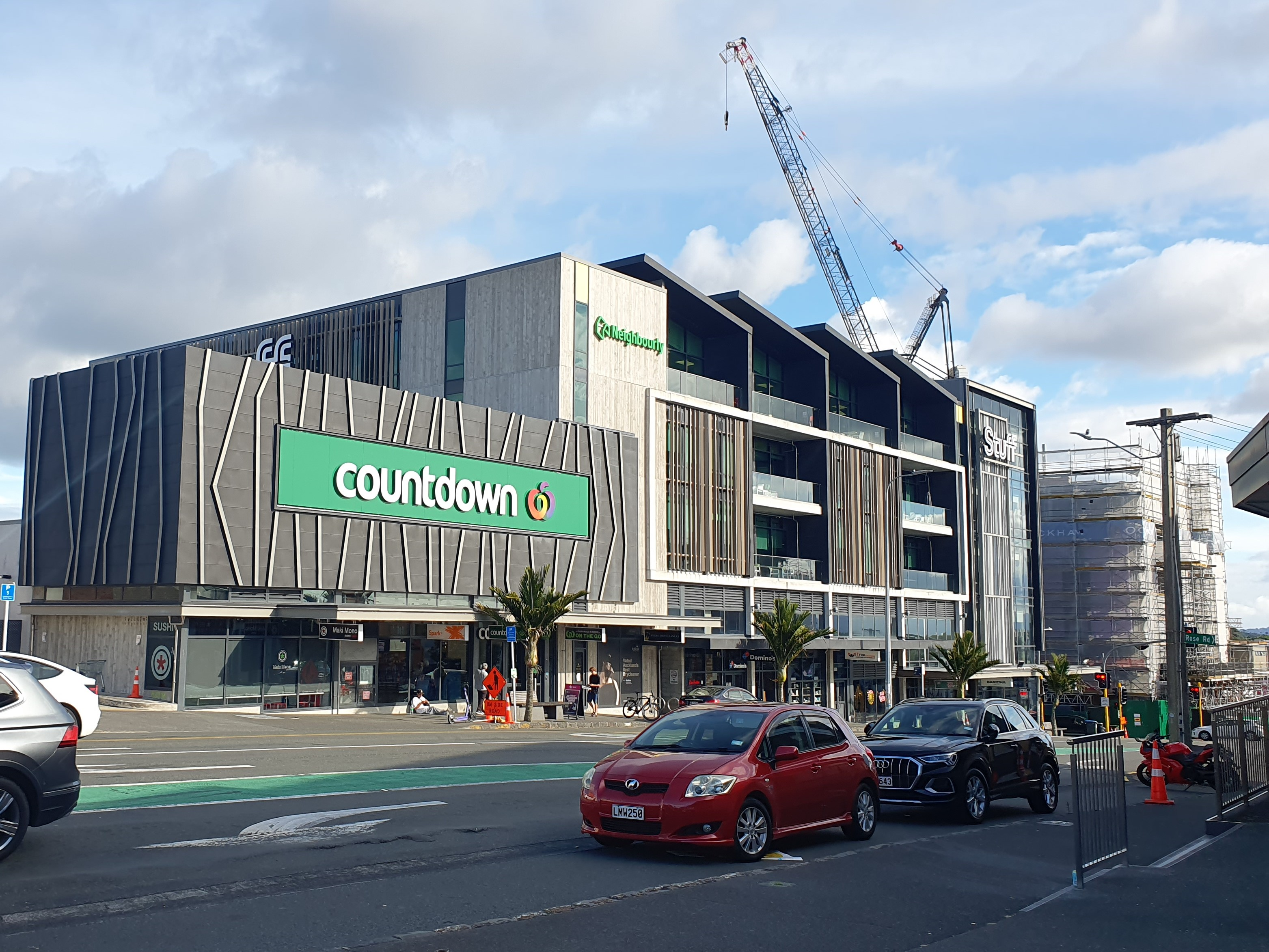
Vinegar Lane in 2023

Vinegar Lane is a development near the suburbs of Ponsonby and Grey Lynn in Auckland, New Zealand. The project was originally announced in 2006 under the name Soho Square Ponsonby, going into receivership by 2009 and leaving a large vacant plot in the area. In 2011 the site was purchased by Progressive Enterprises, which opened a precinct at the site in 2018. As of 2021 a building featuring an underground car park, retail, and office space has been completed, as have multiple residential buildings.

== History ==
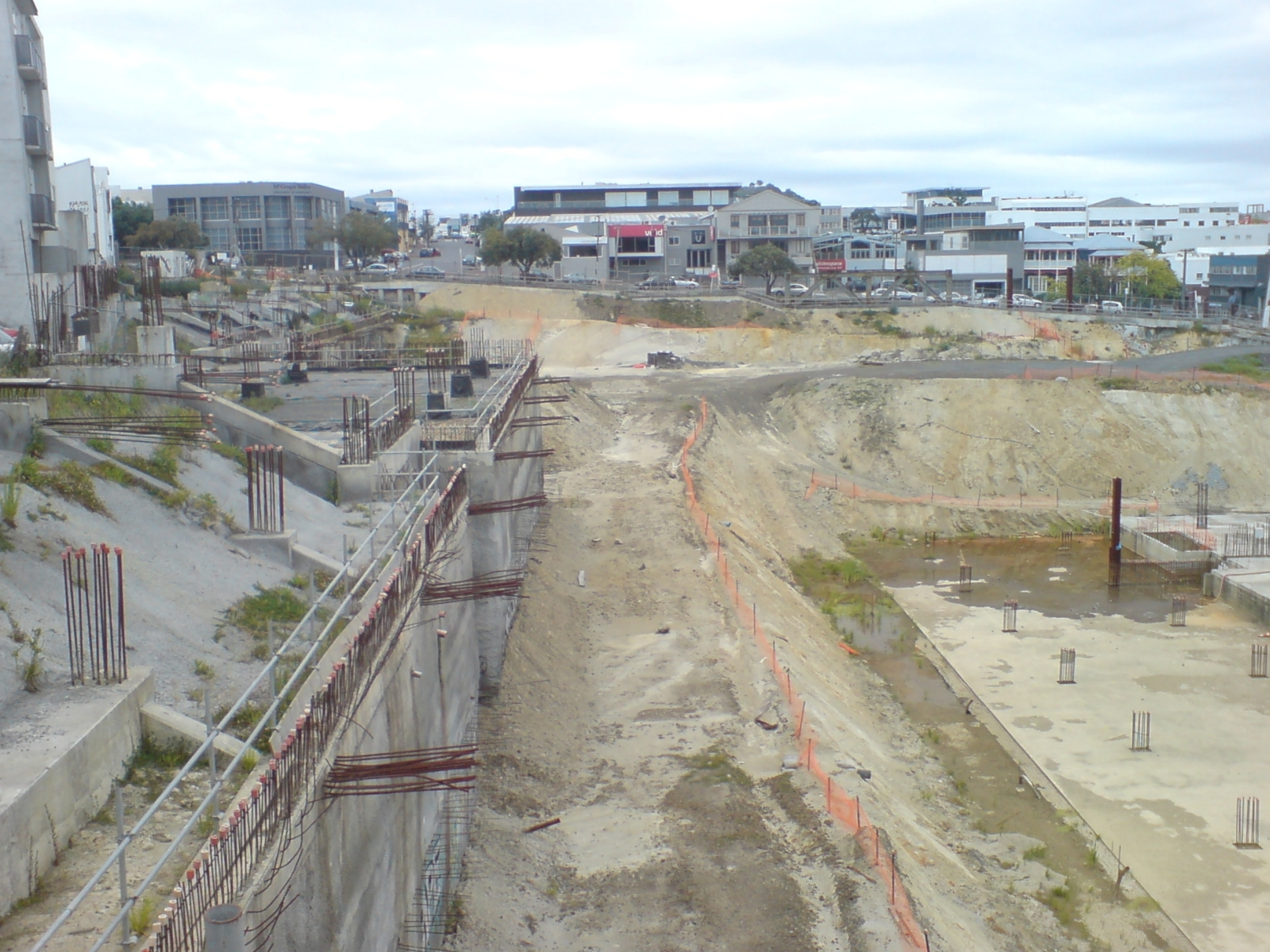
The Soho Square site in 2009

From 1910 the site had been a yeast production plant. The former Dominion Yeast Company site was sold in 2004 by New Zealand Food Industries (now part of the international AB Mauri group) and up until that stage had been producing nearly all of the compressed yeast in New Zealand. The plant has since been moved to Hamilton.

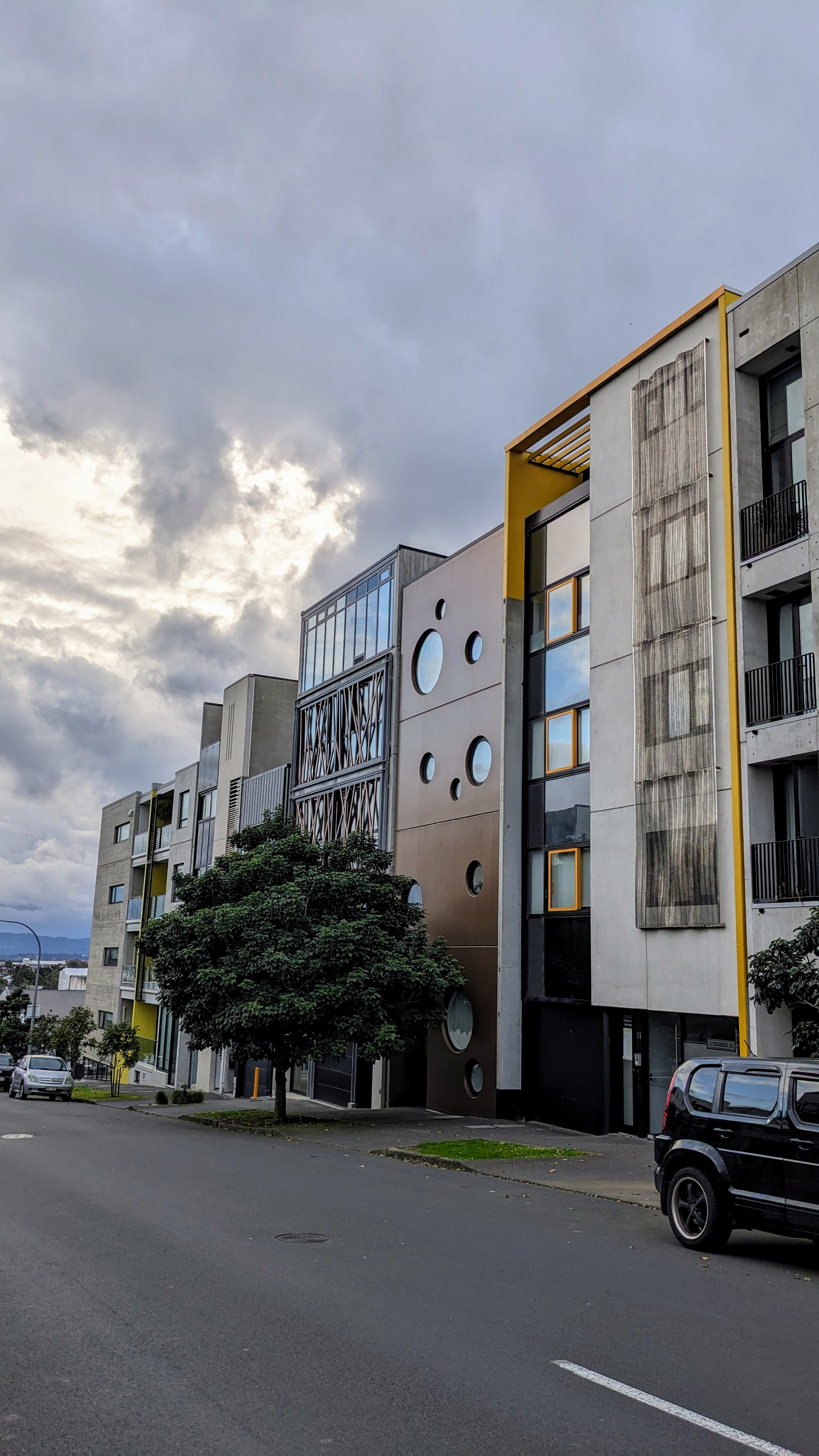
Vinegar precinct buildings in 2024

In 2006 the Marlin Group bought the land of the former plant, announcing a $250 million project under the name Soho Square Ponsonby. The resulting proposal caused controversy: many in the area protested against the development. Protests against the development continued after construction had halted; one included a group of artists using the area as a swimming pool. and was meant to be a major attraction in the area with apartments, office space and retail areas. Construction started on the site soon after. Progress was slow, and in 2008 resource consent for the precinct was turned down. The developers went gone into receivership by the end of 2009. In May 2010 receivers signed a conditional contract with Innovus; this bid failed due diligence and Soho Square was back on the market in August 2010. By early 2010, the development had not progressed further than the initial excavation for five floors of planned underground car park.

In 2011 the site was purchased by Progressive Enterprises with a plan to open a supermarket, an underground carpark, and other retail shops. Work on the site resumed in November 2013, with the first stages of the prenct opened to purchasers in 2018. The new development, Vinegar Lane, features two precincts, Cider and Vinegar, which reference the former use of the site. The Cider Building houses the Countdown supermarket, office space and retail, and the Vinegar precinct is mixed commercial and residential buildings.

The Vinegar precinct was divided into 30 free hold titles, with a covenant of design guides for four-storey mixed use buildings. Each lot's design was completed by different architects, including Bossley Architects, TOA, ASC Architects, and Chris Tate Architecture, to create a cohesive but eclectic . The Vinegar Lane masterplan was completed by Isthmus, for which they were awarded a New Zealand Architecture Award in 2018. The awards jury praised the design for its "balance between design coherence and individual expression, and the provision for mixed-use activity at ground level is totally in keeping with the character of a vibrant neighbourhood."
