= António Pinho Vargas =

Portuguese pianist and composer (born 1951)

António Pinho Vargas (born 15 August 1951 in Vila Nova de Gaia) is a Portuguese composer and pianist specializing in jazz and contemporary music. He has also authored books, essays, and articles on music.

== Career ==
After earning a degree in history from the University of Porto, he studied music at the Rotterdam Conservatory from 1987 to 1990, graduating with a degree in Musical Composition. In 1991, he began teaching musical composition at the Escola Superior de Música in Lisbon. His first jazz album, Outros Lugares, was released in 1983. He has also composed soundtracks for Portuguese films and theatrical plays.

Since his return from the Netherlands, he has primarily focused on classical composition, creating operas, orchestral and ensemble works. His pieces have been recorded by groups such as the Arditti Quartet, Galliard Ensemble, Royal Scottish Academy Brass, and the Northern Sinfonia.

- 1983 Outros Lugares
- 1985 Cores e Aromas
- 1987 As Folhas Novas Mudam de Cor
- 1989 Os Jogos do Mundo
- 1991 Selos e borboletas
- 1995 Monodia
- 1996 A Luz e a Escuridão
- 2001 Versos
- 2003 Os Dias Levantados
- 2008 Solo
- 2009 Solo II
- 2011 Concerto No IST Improvisações
- 2014 Step by Step, Drumming GP plays António Pinho Vargas
- 2014 Outro Fim
- 2014 Requiem & Judas

== List of works ==
=== Ensemble ===
- Sis Portraits of Pain (2005)
- Machines Fictives (pour Pierrot le fou) (2003)
- TRÊS VERSOS DE CAEIRO (1997)
- TRÊS QUADROS PARA ALMADA (1994)
- Estudo/Figura (1990)
- Musica Plana / MÚSICA CONTRAPLANA (1989)

=== Orchestra ===
- Concerto para Violino in memorian Gareguin Aroutiounian
- Quadros (de arte moderna)
- Ouvertures And Closures (2012)
- ONZE CARTAS (2011)
- AN IMPOSSIBLE TASK (2009)
- UM DISCURSO DE THOMAS BERNHARD (2009)
- GRAFFITI [just forms] (2006)
- REENTERING (2004)
- ... VON FREMDEN LÄNDLER ... (2004)
- DUAS PEÇAS (1992–2000)
- A IMPACIÊNCIA DE MAHLER (1999)
- ACTING-OUT (1998–2000)
- EXPLICIT DRAMA (1992)
- GEOMETRAL (1988–2000)

=== Chamber music ===
- NO ART II (2013)
- QUATRO NOVOS FRAGMENTOS (2012)
- STRING QUARTET No. 3 (2011)
- QUASI UNA SONATA (2011)
- QUATRO NOVOS FRAGMENTOS (2010)
- ONE MINUTE TO GO (2010)
- MOVIMENTOS DO SUBSOLO, QUARTETO DE CORDAS No. 2 (2008)
- DOIS VIOLINOS FOR CARLOS PAREDES (2003)
- STEP BY STEP, WOLFS! (2002)
- TRÊS ESTUDOS FOR 2 PIANOS (2000–2001)
- TWO FAMILY DISCUSSIONS (2001)
- QUATRO OU CINCO MOVIMENTOS FUGIDIOS DA ÁGUA (2001)
- SETE CANÇÕES DE ALBANO MARTINS (2000)
- ESTUDOS E INTERLÚDIOS (2000)
- TERCEIRO VERSO DE CAEIRO (1997)
- NOVE CANÇÕES DE ANTÓNIO RAMOS ROSA (1995)
- NOCTURNO/DIURNO (1994)
- MONODIA – Quasi un Requiem (1993)
- MECHANICAL STRING TOYS (1992)
- POETICA DELL'ESTINZIONE (Secondo Mikhal Serguievitch) (1990)
- CUT (1989 / rev. 2004)
- GRAVITAÇÕES (1984)

=== Opera, Oratoria ===
- DE PROFUNDIS (2014)
- MAGNIFICAT (2013)
- REQUIEM (2012)
- OUTRO FIM (2009)
- A LITTLE MADNESS IN THE SPRING (2006)
- JUDAS (secundum Lucam, Joannem, Matthaeum et Marcum) (2002)
- OS DIAS LEVANTADOS (1998)
- ÉDIPO – Tragédia de Saber (1996)
- ANCESTRAL E MUDO (1994)

=== Solo ===
- NO ART: Four Études for Solo Violin (2012)
- POLÍTICAS DA AMIZADE: Estudo para Vibrafone (2011)
- SUITE PARA VIOLONCELO SOLO (2008)
- IL RITORNO (2002)
- HOLDERLINOS (2001)
- LA LUNA (1996)
- MIRRORS (1989)
- TRÊS FRAGMENTOS (1985–87)
- PEÇA (1983)

=== Film music ===
Directed by João Botelho

- 1988: Hard Times
- 1993: Aqui na Terra
- 2001: Who Are You?

Directed by José Fonseca e Costa

- 1996: Cinco dias, cinco noites
- 2003: O fascínio
