= Franco D'Andrea =

Italian jazz pianist and composer

- Born: 8 March 1941 (age 85); Merano, Italy
- Genres: Jazz, bebop, cool jazz, fusion, abstraction
- Occupations: Musician, composer
- Instrument: Piano
- Years active: 1960s–present
- Labels: Philology, Red, El Gallo Rojo, others
- Website: FrancoDandrea.com

Francesco "Franco" D'Andrea (born 8 March 1941 in Merano, Italy) is an Italian jazz pianist and composer.

== Life ==
D'Andrea is considered one of the most famous jazz musicians from Italy and has recorded some 200 albums. He developed his style in the 1960s and won several awards in his home country. He has worked with Gato Barbieri, Steve Lacy, Dave Liebman, John Surman, Kenny Wheeler, Phil Woods, Ernst Reijseger, Slide Hampton, Frank Rosolino, Conte Candoli, Max Roach, Lee Konitz, Johnny Griffin, Tony Scott, Han Bennink, Dave Douglas and also with numerous Italian musicians.

His career began in 1963 with Nunzio Rotondo, playing for the Italian broadcast RAI and in Gato Barbieri's band in 1964 until 1965. D'Andrea continued then with the Italian vanguard ensemble Modern Art Trio (1968–72) and Perigeo (1972-77). Since 1978, he has been playing with his own bands (Trio, Quartet, Eleven) and as a solo performer. He has been a teacher at the Conservatorio "F.A. Bonporti" in Trento 1994-2006 and currently at Mitteleuorpean Jazz Academy in Merano and at Siena Jazz.

In 2010, he received for his life's work the Award "Musicien Européen de l'année" (Académie du Jazz de France) and 2011 the Honorary Award at the Italian Jazz Awards - Luca Flores.

== Discography ==
=== As leader/co-leader ===
Year recorded	Title	Label	Notes
1970?	Modern Art Trio		with Bruno Tommaso and Franco Tonani
1973	Conversations	RCA	with Frank Rosolino, Conte Candoli
1978?	Nuvolao	Carosello	
1980	Dialogues with Superego	Red	Solo piano
1980	Es	Red	Solo piano
1982	Made in Italy	Red	Quartet, with Tino Tracanna (soprano sax, tenor sax), Attilo Zanchi (bass), Gianni Cazzola (drums)
1983?	My One and Only Love	Red	Trio, with Mark Helias (bass), Barry Altschul (drums)
1983	No Idea of Time	Red	Quartet, with Tino Tracanna (soprano sax, tenor sax), Mark Helias (bass), Barry Altschul (drums)
1982	Live	Red	Quartet, with Tino Tracanna (soprano sax, tenor sax), Attilo Zanchi (bass), Gianni Cazzola (drums); in concert
1982	My Shuffle	Red	Quartet, with Tino Tracanna (soprano sax, tenor sax), Attilo Zanchi (bass), Gianni Cazzola (drums)
1988	Kick Off	Red	Trio, with Giovanni Tomasso (bass), Roberto Gatto (drums)
1989	Chromatic Phrygian	YVP	Trio, with Stephen Schertler (bass), Billy Elgart (drums)
1989	Volte	Owl	Trio, with Hein Van De Geyn (bass), Aldo Romano (drums)
1991	Earthcake	Label Bleu	Quartet, with Enrico Rava (trumpet, bugle), Miroslav Vitous (bass), Daniel Humair (drums)
1991	Airegin	Red	Trio, with Giovanni Tomasso (bass), Roberto Gatto (drums)
1991	Enrosadira	Red	Duo, with Luis Agudo (percussion)
1996	3 Lines	Philology	Solo piano, overdubbed
1996	Inside Cole Porter	NEL	Duo, with Lee Konitz (alto sax)
1996	Inside Rodgers	Philology	Duo, with Lee Konitz (alto sax)
1997	Jobim	Philology	Quartet, with Andrea Ayace Ayassot (alto sax), Aldo Mella (bass), Alex Rolle (drums)
1997	Ballads and Rituals	Philology	Quartet, with Andrea Ayace Ayassot (alto sax), Aldo Mella (bass), Alex Rolle (drums)
2000?	Eleven	Via Veneto Jazz	with Steven Bernstein
2001	Solo 1: Standards	Philology	Solo piano
2001	Solo 2: Abstractions	Philology	Solo piano
2001	Solo 3: Woods	Philology	Solo piano
2001	Solo 4: Gato	Philology	Solo piano
2001	Solo 5: Duke	Philology	Solo piano
2001	Solo 6: Valzer Opera Natale	Philology	Solo piano
2001	Solo 7: Napoli	Philology	Solo piano
2001	Solo 8: Classic Jazz	Philology	Solo piano
2002	Magicians at Work	Philology	Duo, with Renato Sellani (piano)
2002	I Love You So Much It Hurts	Winter & Winter	Duo, with Ernst Reijseger (cello)
2002	Round Riff & More	Philology	Trio, with Massimo Morriconi and Ares Tavolazzi (bass)
2003?	Plays Monk: Live at Metastasio Jazz	Philology	
2005?	Creole Rhapsody: D.Ellington	Philology	
2006	The Siena Concert	Blue Note	Quartet, with Andrea Ayace Ayassot (alto sax, soprano sax), Aldo Mella (bass), Zeno De Rossi (drums); in concert
2011	Sorapis	El Gallo Rojo	
2012	Traditions and Clusters	El Gallo Rojo	
2013?	Today	El Gallo Rojo	
2014	Monk and The Time Machine	El Gallo Rojo	
2018	Intervals I	Parco della Musica Records	Franco D'Andrea Octet
2022	Franco D’Andrea meets Dj Rocca	Parco della Musica Records	
2023	Sketches of the 20th Century	Parco della Musica Records	with Parco della musica contemporanea Ensemble
2024	Something Bluesy and More	Parco della Musica Records	with Roberto Gatto (drums), Gabriele Evangelista (bass)
2025	Live	Parco della Musica Records	with Roberto Gatto (drums), Gabriele Evangelista (bass)

=== As sideman ===
With Gato Barbieri

- Last Tango in Paris (United Artists, 1972)

With Lee Konitz

- Stereokonitz (RCA, 1968)

With Phil Woods

- Ornithology (Philology, 1994)

==== With Perigeo ====
- 1972 Azimut
- 1973 Abbiamo tutti un blues da piangere
- 1974 Genealogia
- 1975 La valle dei templi
- 1975 Live at Montreaux (Live)
- 1976 Non è poi così lontano
- 1976 Live in Italy 1976 (Live)
- 1977 Attraverso il Perigeo (Raccolta)
- 1977 Fata Morgana (LP, Album) (RCA Victor)

==== With Perigeo Special ====
- 1980 Alice

== Bibliography ==
- 26 compositions, Crepuscule, Milano 1982
- Enciclopedia comparata delle scale e degli accordi (with Attilio Zanchi), Centro Professione Musica, Carisch, Milano, 1992
- Dall'Africa allo swing - la poliritmia nel linguaggio Jazz, educational film, Carisch, Milano, 1996
- Aree intervallari (with Luigi Ranghino), Volontè & Co, 2011

== Filmography ==
- 2006 - Franco D'Andrea Jazz Pianist (Miramonte Film)
