= Solo 2: Abstractions =

Studio album by Franco D'Andrea
- Recorded: April 2001
- Genre: Jazz
- Label: Philology

Solo 2: Abstractions is a solo piano album by Franco D'Andrea. It was recorded in 2001 and released by Philology Records.

== Recording and music ==
Material for this and seven other solo piano CDs was recorded over the period of three mornings and two afternoons in April 2001. The tracks are free jazz pieces.

== Release and reception ==
Professional ratings
Review scores
Source	Rating
AllMusic	4/5 stars
The Penguin Guide to Jazz	3/4 stars

Solo 2 was released by Philology Records. The AllMusic reviewer concluded: "The adventuresome spirit throughout this recording will have piano lovers going back again and again to appreciate new facets within this gem of a release."

== Track listing ==
1. "Mixed"
2. "Abstract Rhythms"
3. "Thirds"
4. "On the Edge"
5. "Area N. 1"
6. "Fifths and More"
7. "Via Libera"
8. "Area N. 4"
9. "Area N. 3"
10. "Empty Spaces"
11. "Area N. 5"
12. "Area N. 2"

== Personnel ==
- Franco D'Andrea – piano
