= Solo 1: Standards =

Studio album by Franco D'Andrea
- Recorded: April 2001
- Genre: Jazz
- Label: Philology

Solo 1: Standards is a solo piano album by Franco D'Andrea. It was recorded in 2001 and released by Philology Records.

== Recording and music ==
Material for this and seven other solo piano CDs was recorded over the period of three mornings and two afternoons in April 2001. The album begins with a medley of a post-bop performance of "Gone with the Wind", together with "Basin Street Blues" and "Way Down Yonder in New Orleans". The next medley, of "I Got Rhythm" and "I Loves You, Porgy", is played in an unusually angular manner.

== Release and reception ==
Professional ratings
Review scores
Source	Rating
AllMusic	4.5/5 stars
The Penguin Guide to Jazz	3/4 stars

Solo 1 was released by Philology Records. The AllMusic reviewer concluded: "This brilliant release should be considered essential listening for fans of jazz piano."

== Track listing ==
1. "Gone with the Wind / Basin Street Blues / Way Down Yonder in New Orleans"
2. "I Got Rhythm / I Loves You, Porgy"
3. "Summertime"
4. "Cherokee"
5. "Lover Man"

== Personnel ==
- Franco D'Andrea – piano
