= Solo 6: Valzer Opera Natale =

Studio album by Franco D'Andrea
- Recorded: April 2001
- Genre: Jazz
- Label: Philology

Solo 6: Valzer Opera Natale is a solo piano album by Franco D'Andrea. It was recorded in 2001 and released by Philology Records.

== Recording and music ==
Material for this and seven other solo piano CDs was recorded over the period of three mornings and two afternoons in April 2001. The compositions are mainly associated with Christmas and opera. The medleys contain unusual combinations.

== Release and reception ==
Professional ratings
Review scores
Source	Rating
AllMusic	4.5/5 stars
The Penguin Guide to Jazz	3/4 stars

Solo 6 was released by Philology Records. AllMusic praised the recording sound quality and described the album as "very eclectic and a breath of fresh air".

== Track listing ==
1. "Oh Dû Fröhliche"
2. "An Der Schönen Blauen Donau"
3. "Un Bel Di' Vedremo / Libiamo"
4. "Zitti Zitti, Non Destatelo"
5. "Wienerwald / What Is This Thing Called Love"
6. "Habanera"
7. "Oh Tannenbaum"
8. "Stille Nacht"

== Personnel ==
- Franco D'Andrea – piano
