= Solo 8: Classic Jazz =

Studio album by Franco D'Andrea
- Recorded: April 2001
- Genre: Jazz
- Label: Philology

Solo 8: Classic Jazz is a solo piano album by Franco D'Andrea. It was recorded in 2001 and released by Philology Records.

== Recording and music ==
Material for this and seven other solo piano CDs was recorded over the period of three mornings and two afternoons in April 2001. The compositions are traditional jazz pieces.

== Release and reception ==
Professional ratings
Review scores
| Source | Rating |
|---|---|
| AllMusic | 4/5 stars |
| The Penguin Guide to Jazz | 3/4 stars |

Solo 8 was released by Philology Records. The AllMusic reviewer suggested that "once a buyer has had an opportunity to hear some of his other solo releases it's a safe bet that this intriguing disc will join the others in his or her collection".

== Track listing ==
1. "C Jam Blues / Muskrat Ramble"
2. "Black and Blue / Do You Know What It Means to Miss New Orleans / Struttin'"
3. "I've Found a New Baby"
4. "Charleston / Way Down Yonder in New Orleans / Basin Street Blues"
5. "Savoy Blues / Twelfth Street Rag"

== Personnel ==
- Franco D'Andrea – piano
