= Catoire =

Catoire is a surname of French origin. Notable people with the surname include:

- Georgy Catoire (1861–1926), Russian composer of French heritage
- Jean Catoire (1923–2005), French composer
