= Sweet Love, Bitter =

Sweet Love, Bitter may refer to:

- Sweet Love, Bitter (album)
- Sweet Love, Bitter (film)
