= Bill DeArango =

American jazz guitarist

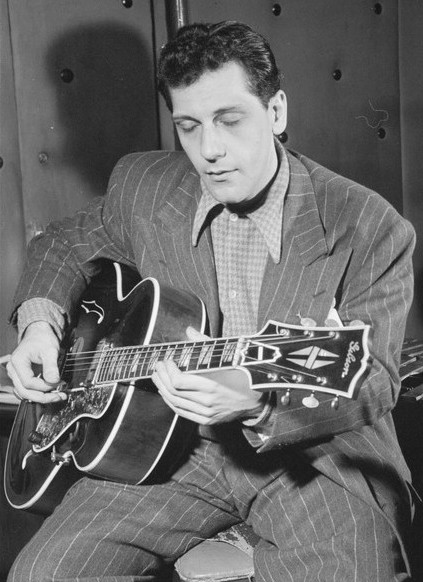
- Bill DeArango in June 1947. Photo taken by William P. Gottlieb

Background information
- Born: William Louis Dearango; September 20, 1921; Cleveland, Ohio, U.S.
- Died: December 26, 2005 Cleveland
- Genres: Jazz
- Occupation: Musician
- Instrument: Guitar
- Years active: 1930s–1990s

William Louis DeArango (20 September 1921 – 26 December 2005) was an American jazz guitarist.

== Career ==
DeArango was self-taught on guitar. While he attended Ohio State University, he played with Dixieland bands at night. After serving in the Army from 1942 to 1944, he moved to New York City and worked with Don Byas and Ben Webster. A year later, he recorded with Sarah Vaughan, Charlie Parker, and Dizzy Gillespie. He worked as a sideman with Eddie "Lockjaw" Davis, Ike Quebec, Slam Stewart, then led his own band with Terry Gibbs.

In 1947, DeArango returned to Cleveland. In the 1960s he opened up a guitar store and taught guitar lessons. DeArango also performed locally for two decades. He recorded an album with pianist John Williams in 1954. Late in the 1960s, he managed the rock band Henry Tree and performed regularly in the 1970s at the Smiling Dog Saloon in Cleveland with Ernie Krivda and Skip Hadden, mixing hard rock and free jazz.

His next recording was on the album Another Time/Another Place (Muse, 1978) by Barry Altschul, then 298 Bridge Street (1981) by Kenny Werner, and Names (1983) by Jamey Haddad. In 1993, he released his second solo album, Anything Went, with Joe Lovano. He entered a nursing home in 1999 and suffered dementia until his death seven years later, although he continued performing locally until late 2001.

== Discography ==
=== As leader ===
- Bill DeArango (EmArcy, 1954)
- Anything Went (GM, 1996)

=== As sideman ===
With Charlie Ventura

- Jumping with Ventura (EmArcy, 1955)
- Charlie Ventura's Carnegie Hall Concert (Columbia, 1956)
- Crazy Rhythms (Regent, 1957)
- East of Suez (Regent, 1958)

With others

- Barry Altschul, Another Time/Another Place (Muse, 1978)
- Dizzy Gillespie, The Complete RCA Victor Recordings (Bluebird, 1946 1995)
- Jamey Haddad, Names (Ananda, 1983)
- Red Norvo, Mainstream Jazz (Continental, 1945 [1962]) – relevant session originally under Slam Stewart
- Charlie Parker, Bird Lives (Continental, 1945 [1962]) – three tracks only
- Michael Bocian, I Am the Blues (Ulua Music, 1994)
