= Krivda =

Krivda is a surname. Notable people with the surname include:

- Ernie Krivda (born 1945), American jazz saxophone player
- Rick Krivda (born 1970), American baseball player
