= News from the 70s =

Compilation album by Anthony Braxton
- Released: 1998
- Recorded: 1971–1976
- Venue: various
- Genre: Free jazz
- Length: 1:14:35
- Labels: Musica Jazz/New Tone Records/Felmay; FY 7005

News from the 70s is an album by Anthony Braxton that compiles previously unreleased live tracks recorded during 1971–1976.

== Background ==
During 1996, Italian musicologist and jazz writer Francesco Martinelli travelled to Wesleyan University at the invitation of Braxton in order to present a lecture on the European improvisation scene. At some point during the visit, Braxton and Martinelli visited Braxton's basement, where they found a cardboard box full of tapes, most of them dating from the 1970s. Martinelli returned to Italy with a dozen of these tapes, from which he selected six tracks for inclusion on a CD. The resulting album, News from the 70s, was released by New Tone Records in 1998, and was initially given away with an issue of Musica Jazz Magazine, after which it was issued commercially by the Felmay label.

The album opens with a May 1974 recording from Groningen, the Netherlands, of "Composition 23E," on which Braxton, heard on sopranino saxophone, clarinet, and piccolo, is joined by flugelhornist Kenny Wheeler, double bassist Dave Holland, and percussionist Barry Altschul. Versions of this piece had previously appeared on both Quartet: Live at Moers Festival (Ring, 1976) and the studio recording Five Pieces 1975 (Arista, 1975). Tracks 2 and 5, "Composition 8C" and "Composition 8G," are alto saxophone solos recorded in France during 1971; Martinelli noted that they resemble tracks on For Alto (Delmark, 1971).

Track 3, "Composition -1," features Braxton on clarinet and Holland on cello, and was recorded at the same May 1972 Town Hall, New York City, concert that yielded Town Hall 1972 (Trio, 1972). On track 4, "Composition -2," Braxton, on alto sax, and Wheeler, on trumpet, are joined by composer Antoine Duhamel on piano and Algerian double bassist François Mechali. This performance dates from a concert at Salle Paul-Fort in Nantes, France, during December 1973. The final track, a rendition of Holland's "Four Winds," a composition originally heard on Conference of the Birds (ECM, 1973), is from an October 1976 concert in Graz, Austria, and features Braxton on alto sax, George Lewis on trombone, Holland on bass, and Altschul on drums.

== Reception ==
Professional ratings
Review scores
Source	Rating
AllMusic	5/5 stars
The Penguin Guide to Jazz	4/4 stars
Tom Hull – on the Web	B+

The editors of AllMusic awarded the album a full 5 stars, and reviewer Steve Loewy stated that it "features Braxton at the height of his power and makes an indispensable contribution to his discography." He wrote: "Sparks fly throughout, as this collection enthralls with some of the best jazz of the era."

In a 4-star review, the authors of The Penguin Guide to Jazz Recordings commented: "Braxton is immensely engaging on his high-end instruments... Lewis is in powerful, almost tailgating form. Wheeler's flugelhorn work is as intense and thoughtful as ever."

Glenn Astarita of All About Jazz remarked: "News from the 70s is a welcome surprise and is a must for the Anthony Braxton completist and for those who may be too curious to let this one slip away. The sound quality is okay and holds up well considering that amateurs made the original tapes. Recommended."

Writing for Jazz Word, Ken Waxman noted: "Braxton's improvising and band leading is emphasized as much as his composing here, and hearing him in contexts ranging from solo to quartet you quickly pick up on the skill, technique and intensity that drew people to him in the first place... this CD... is both musically and historically fascinating."

In a review for Coda, David Lewis wrote: "four of these six performances are classics... As 'Four Winds' fades away, I regret that more of the medley was not included... Nevertheless essential."

Writer Todd S. Jenkins called the album "a spectacular release," noting that it is "filled with surprises and strong moments," and commenting: "each piece is a bright gem."

== Track listing ==
"Four Winds" composed by Dave Holland. Remaining tracks composed by Anthony Braxton.

1. "Composition 23E" – 16:40
2. "Composition 8C" – 8:40
3. "Composition -1" – 14:25
4. "Composition -2" – 11:09
5. "Composition 8G" – 7:59
6. "Four Winds" – 15:42
- Track 1 was recorded in Groningen, Holland, on May 16 or 17, 1974. Tracks 2 and 5 were recorded in France during 1971. Track 3 was recorded at Town Hall in New York City on May 22, 1972. Track 4 was recorded at Salle Paul-Fort in Nantes, France, on December 7, 1973. Track 6 was recorded in Graz, Austria, during October 1976.

== Personnel ==
- Anthony Braxton – alto saxophone, sopranino saxophone, clarinet, piccolo
- Kenny Wheeler – flugelhorn, trumpet (tracks 1 and 4)
- George Lewis – trombone (track 6)
- Antoine Duhamel – piano (track 4)
- François Mechali – double bass (track 4)
- Dave Holland – double bass, cello (tracks 1, 3, 6)
- Barry Altschul – drums, percussion (tracks 1 and 6)
