= Nicolas Horvath =

French pianist and electroacoustic composer

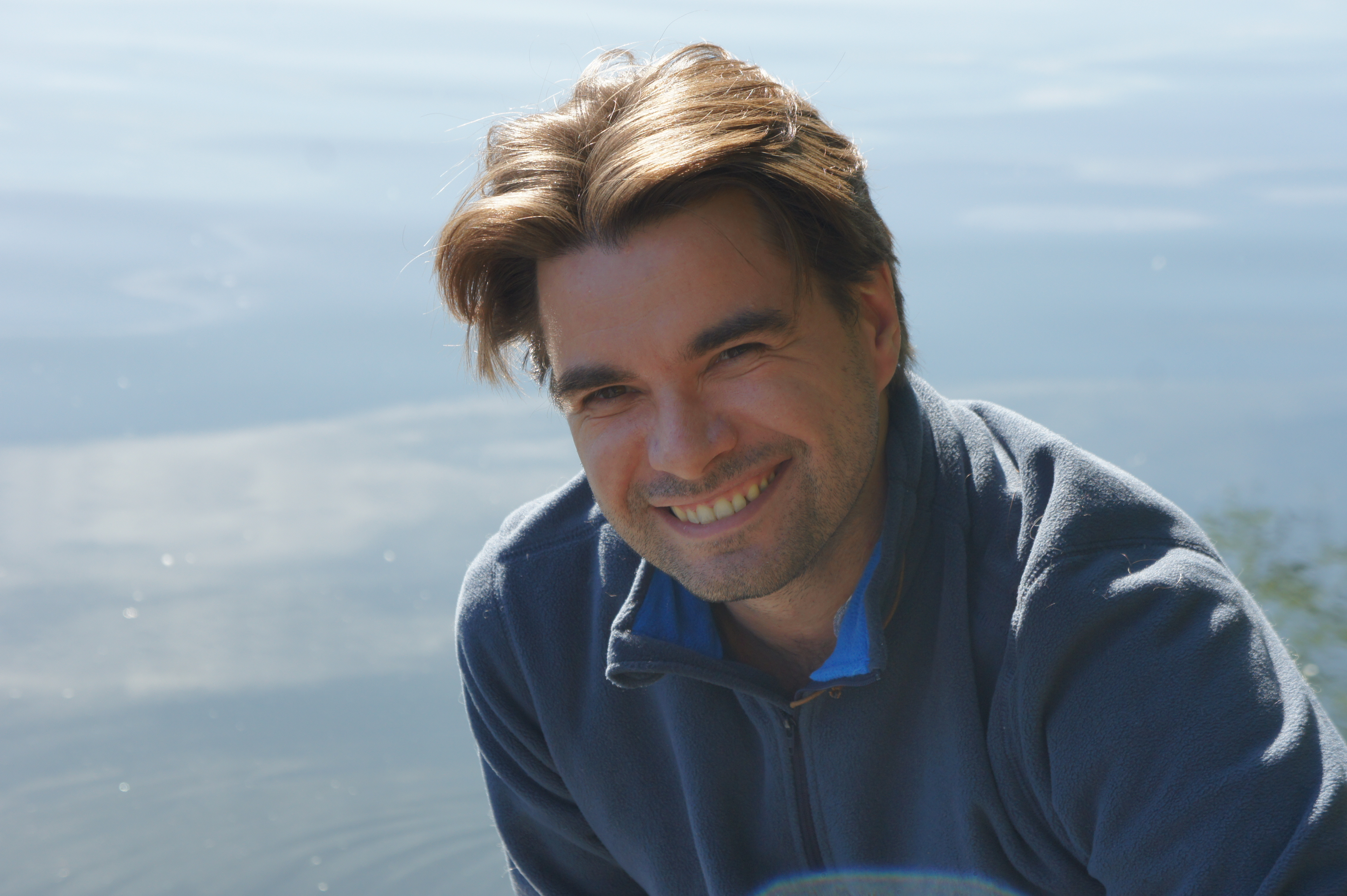
- Horvath on the Santiago Pilgrimage

Background information
- Born: August 11, 1977 (age 49); Monaco
- Instrument: Piano
- Label: Naxos Records
- Website: nicolashorvath.com

Nicolas Horvath (born 11 August 1977) is a French pianist and electroacoustic composer.

== Education ==
At 10, Nicolas Horvath was selected for a program initiated by Monaco's Princess Grace for children with musical predispositions. He received the Academie de Musique Prince Rainier III Prize unanimously with the congratulations of the jury.

At the age of 15, during an Academie de Musique Prince Rainier III competition, he was discovered by the conductor Lawrence Foster who obtained a scholarship from Princess Grace Foundation allowing him to work for three consecutive summers at Aspen Music Festival and School with Gabriel Chodos. On his return, he worked for two years with Gérard Frémy who introduced him to contemporary music.

In 1998, he joined the École Normale de Musique in Paris. Beginning in 2002 he worked for four years with Bruno Leonardo Gelber and Germaine Deveze who asked him not to give any concert or participate in any competition during his apprenticeship. Then he left l'École Normale. In 2004, he joined Gino Favotti's electroacoustic composition class where he received masterclasses from François Bayle and Christian Zanési and in 2006 Christine Groult's electroacoustic composition class.

From 2008 to 2011, he won numerous international competitions such as the Luigi Nono Competition, Alexander Scriabin, Osaka, Fukuoka, Yokohama. In 2010, he joined the Oxana Yablonskaya Piano School and The International Certificate for Piano Artists. Meetings with Leslie Howard, Gabriel Tacchino, Philippe Entremont, and Éric Heidsieck, mark his career.

== Career ==
Nicolas Horvath collaborates with composers such as Régis Campo, Denis Levaillant, Jaan Rääts, Tõnu Kõrvits, Alvin Curran, Fabio Mengozzi, William Susman, Alp Durmaz, Andre Bangambula Vindu, Mamoru Fujieda ... he ensures the creation of pieces of more than two hundred composers and more than a hundred pieces are dedicated to him. Nicolas Horvath also plays little-known works such as Franz Liszt's Christus, Claude Debussy's The Fall of the House of Usher, the complete version of Erik Satie's The Son of the Stars as well as forgotten, neglected composers such as Moondog, Hélène de Montgeroult, Ludovic Lamothe, Jacques Champion de Chambonnières, Friedrich Kalkbrenner, Élisabeth Jacquet de La Guerre, Nobuo Uematsu, Charles-Valentin Alkan, Karl August Hermann...

Nicolas Horvath stands out by organizing marathon concerts such as Erik Satie's Vexations which he performed 12 times alone and without any stop or break, the Nights of Minimalist Piano and the complete Erik Satie or Philip Glass piano music.

On April 21, 2012, with Andrea Clanetti Santarossa, they did in Monaco's Entrepot Gallery the very first Monacan happening on La Monte Young music. Some of the audience was scandalized by it and left the gallery shouting.

On December 12, 2012, he gave in Paris's museum Palais de Tokyo a non-stop solo version of 35 hours of Erik Satie's Vexations. Starting December 12 at noon and ending December 13 at 11 pm.

From the June 23 to July 27, 2013, he was invited by the DO NOT OPEN Gallery in Brussels to give his first exhibit, highly influenced by Clyfford Still & Hermann Nitsch

On April 11, 2014, in the Palais de Tokyo, he premiered the GlassWorlds, a gigantic Philip Glass Homage where 120 composers from 56 countries and all musical genres wrote a work for this program.

On January 9, 2015, in Carnegie Hall, New York, he premiered the Complete 20 Philip Glass Etudes.

On October 10 to 12, 2015, in Paris's Le Grand Rex, for the 1st encore of Danny Elfman's anniversary concert, Nicolas Horvath was in duet with the composer himself to perform Elfman's Oogie Boogie's song.

On October 31, 2015, The Gallery of Estonia (the Estonian pavilion) as part of the Milan World Expo closing day invited him to give the first Jaan Rääts music only recital.

On May 25, 2016, he gave a Jaan Rääts recital at Strasbourg European Parliament for the inauguration Ceremony of Estonia at the lead of the Council of Europe.

On the night of October 1 to 2, 2016, at the Paris Philharmonie Boulez Hall, he performed a twelve-hour-long marathon of piano works by Philip Glass.

In April 2017, he requested to all Jaan Rääts' students, such as Erkki-Sven Tüür, Tõnu Kõrvits, Timo Steiner, Kerri Kotta ... to compose each of them an exclusive piece for an all-Estonia Jaan Rääts Homage tour (for the 85th anniversary of composer).

On March 18, 2018, he gave a world premiere in Nantes during the Festival Variations the complete piano music of Erik Satie.

On March 24, 2018, he was invited by the Labenche Museum in Brive-la-Gaillarde to give a Claude Debussy recital for his centenary on the composer's last piano. During this concert Nicolas Horvath premiered Claude Debussy works completed by the musicologist Robert Orledge.

On September 9, 2018, he gave the world premiere of Moondog 's Complete Book of Canons n°1, 2 & 3 and The Great Canon in Toulouse for the opening concert of the Moondog Season and for the Piano aux Jacobins Festival.

On April 28, 2019, he was the first pianist ever to perform in a single concert and without any break all 15 Karlheinz Stockhausen's Klavierstuke for solo piano in Nantes for the Variations Festival.

On May 17 and 18, 2019, he was selected by Philip Glass himself to perform Glass' Etudes nos. 13 and 14 during the Philip Glass & Friends concerts at the Philharmonie de Paris.

In 2024 and 2025, he launched a project titled Year of Bach, during which he recorded all of the chorales by Johann Sebastian Bach. The project received some criticism due to its name, which is also used by an existing blog and podcast about Bach created by Evan Goldfine, a fractional chief financial officer and investor.

== Discography ==
=== Classical music ===
- J.S. Bach: Year of Bach/Bach Complete Chorales - 12 Volumes from November 24 to October 25 (1 album per volume), Azure Sky
- Anne-Louise Brillon de Jouy: The Piano Sonatas Rediscovered. 2 CD Naxos – Grand Piano Records, 2021
- Frédéric Chopin: The Secret Nocturnes, Vol.1. 1 CD – Collection 1001 Notes, 2024
- Frédéric Chopin: The Secret Nocturnes, Vol.2. 1 CD – Collection 1001 Notes, 2025
- Frédéric Chopin: The Secret Nocturnes, Vol.3. 1 CD – Collection 1001 Notes, 2026
- Karl Czerny: 30 Études de Mécanisme, Op. 849 OCLC 1127643409, CD Naxos – Grand Piano Records, 2019
- Claude Debussy: The Unknown Debussy - Rare Piano Music, CD Naxos – Grand Piano Records, 2020
- Karl August Hermann: Complete Piano Music OCLC 1051435520, CD Toccata Classics, 2018
- Franz Liszt: Christus OCLC 917894190, CD Editions Horus, 2012
- Hélène de Montgeroult: The Complete Piano Sonatas, 2 CD Naxos – Grand Piano Records, 2021
- Erik Satie: Nuit Erik Satie Live at Philharmonie de Paris, DVD Blu-ray HD – Grand Piano Records, 2022
- Erik Satie: Complete Piano Works, New Salabert Edition vol.4 OCLC 1120211918, CD Naxos – Grand Piano Records, 2019
- Erik Satie: Complete Piano Works, New Salabert Edition vol.3 OCLC 1032830188, Naxos – Grand Piano Records, 2018
- Erik Satie: Complete Piano Works, New Salabert Edition vol.2 OCLC 1018313315, CD Naxos – Grand Piano Records, 2018
- Erik Satie: Complete Piano Works, New Salabert Edition vol.1 OCLC 1000300962, CD Naxos – Grand Piano Records, 2017
- Germaine Tailleferre: Her Piano Works, Revived vol.1, CD Naxos – Grand Piano Records, 2022

=== Contemporary / Minimalist / Experimental Music ===
- Giuliano d'Angiolini: Aria, Digital Collection 1001 Notes / 2CD ACEL – Nicolas Horvath Discoveries, 2024
- Dante Boon: Dreamings,, Digital Collection 1001 Notes / 2CD ACEL – Nicolas Horvath Discoveries, 2024
- Thérèse Brenet: Le Visionnaire CD Editions Musik Fabrik, 2012
- Lawrence Ball: Prayer for the Breath of the World,, Digital Collection 1001 Notes / CD ACEL – Nicolas Horvath Discoveries, 2023
- John Cage: In a Landscape, Digital Collection 1001 Notes / CD ACEL – Nicolas Horvath Discoveries, 2022
- Carlos Peron Cano: Ghostly, Digital Collection 1001 Notes / CD ACEL – Nicolas Horvath Discoveries, 2024
- Cornelius Cardew: Treatise (Harsh-Noise version) OCLC 940512655, CD Demerara Records, 2016
- Jean Catoire: Complete Piano Works Boxset, 28CD ACEL – Nicolas Horvath Discoveries, 2022
- Jean Catoire: Complete Piano Works Vol.8, Digital Collection 1001 Notes – Nicolas Horvath Discoveries, 2022
- Jean Catoire: Complete Piano Works Vol.7, Digital Collection 1001 Notes – Nicolas Horvath Discoveries, 2022
- Jean Catoire: Complete Piano Works Vol.6, Digital Collection 1001 Notes – Nicolas Horvath Discoveries, 2022
- Jean Catoire: Complete Piano Works Vol.5, Digital Collection 1001 Notes – Nicolas Horvath Discoveries, 2022
- Jean Catoire: Complete Piano Works Vol.4, Digital Collection 1001 Notes – Nicolas Horvath Discoveries, 2022
- Jean Catoire: Complete Piano Works Vol.3, Digital Collection 1001 Notes – Nicolas Horvath Discoveries, 2022
- Jean Catoire: Complete Piano Works Vol.2, Digital Collection 1001 Notes – Nicolas Horvath Discoveries, 2022
- Jean Catoire: Complete Piano Works Vol.1, Digital Collection 1001 Notes – Nicolas Horvath Discoveries, 2021
- David Christoffel: Echecs Opératiques, Digital Collection 1001 Notes / 3CD ACEL – Nicolas Horvath Discoveries, 2023
- Melaine Dalibert: En Abyme, Digital Collection 1001 Notes / CD ACEL – Nicolas Horvath Discoveries, 2022
- Melaine Dalibert: Horizons,, Digital Collection 1001 Notes / CD ACEL – Nicolas Horvath Discoveries, 2024
- Romain Dasnoy: Fractal Piano (tracks 2 to 12 are arranged by Nicolas Horvath, track 1 Fractal in the Rain composed by Akira Yamaoka and arranged by Nicolas Horvath and track 13 Fractal Passages is composed and arranged by Noriyuki Iwadare), Digital RD Records, 2025
- Julius Eastman: Three Extended Pieces for Four Pianos, 2 CD & 2 LP, Sub Rosa, 2021
- Michael Jon Fink: Sunless, Digital Collection 1001 Notes / CD ACEL – Nicolas Horvath Discoveries, 2023
- Philip Glass: Essentials : LP 80th anniversary tribute OCLC 978302041, LP Naxos – Grand Piano Records, 2017
- Philip Glass: GlassWorlds vol.6 OCLC 1127173041, CD Naxos – Grand Piano Records, 2019
- Philip Glass: GlassWorlds vol.5 OCLC 1016456741, CD Naxos – Grand Piano Records, 2016
- Philip Glass: GlassWorlds vol.4 OCLC 986241205, CD Naxos – Grand Piano Records, 2016
- Philip Glass: GlassWorlds vol.3 OCLC 933308819, CD Naxos – Grand Piano Records, 2016
- Philip Glass: GlassWorlds vol.2 OCLC 919318502, CD Naxos – Grand Piano Records, 2015
- Philip Glass: GlassWorlds vol.1 OCLC 9052395389, CD Naxos – Grand Piano Records, 2015
- Pal Hermann: Complete Surviving Music Vol.3, CD Toccata Classics, 2024
- Eva-Maria Houben: Gesänge des tages und der nacht, Digital Collection 1001 Notes / CD ACEL – Nicolas Horvath Discoveries, 2023
- Anastassis Philippakopoulos: Silent Lights, Digital Collection 1001 Notes / 2CD ACEL – Nicolas Horvath Discoveries, 2023
- Hans Otte: The Book of Sounds, Digital Collection 1001 Notes / 2CD ACEL – Nicolas Horvath Discoveries, 2022
- Terry Jennings: Winter Sun, Digital Collection 1001 Notes / CD ACEL – Nicolas Horvath Discoveries, 2023
- Dennis Johnson: November, Digital Collection 1001 Notes / 6CD ACEL – Nicolas Horvath Discoveries, 2022
- Tom Johnson: One Hour for Piano, Digital Collection 1001 Notes / CD ACEL – Nicolas Horvath Discoveries, 2022
- Tom Johnson: The Chord Catalogue, Digital Collection 1001 Notes / 4CD ACEL – Nicolas Horvath Discoveries, 2022
- Dominique Lawalrée: De Temps en Temps, Digital Collection 1001 Notes / CD ACEL – Nicolas Horvath Discoveries, 2024
- Denis Levaillant: Daydreams - Piano Works No.8 : Piano Songs, Vols.1&2, 1 CD – Azure Sky, 2025
- Alvin Lucier: Music for Piano XL, CD Naxos - Grand Piano Records, 2021
- Nicolas Horvath: Improvisation Ritual (in the Hyoscamus Thurneman compilation), Book CD, Ajna Offensive, 2020
- Jaan Rääts: Complete Piano Sonatas Vol.1 OCLC 1004345009, CD Naxos – Grand Piano Records, 2017
- Ehsan Saboohi: Iranian Haiku, Digital Collection 1001 Notes / CD ACEL – Nicolas Horvath Discoveries, 2023
- Morteza Shirkoohi: Divine Thoughts, Digital Collection 1001 Notes / CD ACEL – Nicolas Horvath Discoveries, 2022
- William Susman: Quiet Rhythms Book I, Digital Collection 1001 Notes / CD Belarca – Nicolas Horvath Discoveries, 2022
- Samuel Vriezen: Within Fourths / Within Fifths, Digital Collection 1001 Notes / CD ACEL – Nicolas Horvath Discoveries, 2024
- Michael Vincent Waller: The South Shore (Pasticcio per meno è più, CD1 - track 5) OCLC 908574406, CD XI Records, 2015
- Stolen Symphony – fluxus & neofluxus: (La Monte Young): 2CD SubRosa & Edizioni Conz 2023
- The French avant-garde in the 20th century: (Claude Debussy, Marcel Duchamp, Olivier Greif, Jean Catoire, Philippe Hersant): OCLC 971575519, CD LTM Recordings, 20145) OCLC 908574406, CD XI Records, 2015

=== Video Game / Anime Music ===
- Assassin's Creed : The Piano Collection, LP & Double LP collector, Ubisoft Music / Harmonia Mundi / Cité de la Musique, 2026
- SNK Sound Waves - Wayo Piano Collection (32 tracks arranged officially by Nicolas Horvath), CD & LP Wayô Records, 2025
- Studio Ghibli: Piano Collection, (The Lost Paradise, Heartbroken Kiki, Madness, Soothball, Deep Sea Pasture arranged officially by Nicolas Horvath) CD & 2LP Wayô Records, 2023
- Little Big Adventure: Symphonic Suite & OST, (Little Big Adventure Wayô Piano Collection (CD2 track 10 to 13 + 2 bonus track on digital release) transcription by Nicolas Horvath) 2CD Wayô Records, 2021
- Magician Lord: Original Soundtrack (Magician Lord Wayô Piano Collection (piste 19) transcription by Nicolas Horvath), CD & LP Wayô Records, 2020

=== Collaborations ===
- Soror Dolorosa: Mond (track 06: Broken Love), CD, LP Prophecy Productions 2024
- Merzbow + Nicolas Horvath: PiaNoise, CD Sub Rosa, 2022
- Opening Performance Orchestra + Nicolas Horvath: Fluxus Edition, CD Sub Rosa 2022
- Lustmord + Nicolas Horvath: The Fall / Dennis Johnson's November Deconstructed, CD, 2 LP Sub Rosa, 2020
- Melek-Tha + Nicolas Horvath: Les Montagnes du Délire Sonores, 6 CD + LP

=== Original Sound Track ===
- At Last (2022): Short movie realised by Lancelot Mingau (Won theBest OST Prize during the Night of Short Movies in 2023)

=== Electroacoustic / Dark Ambient ===
- N.Horvath: The Tape Years, 6 CDR La Fabrique des Reves, 2020
- N.Horvath: Twilight Amorphousness Of The Vague Abysses, CDR Valse Sinistre Productions, 2015
- N.Horvath: At The Mountains Of Madness, CDR Valse Sinistre Productions, 2015
- N.Horvath: The Dreams In The Witch-House, CDR Valse Sinistre Productions, 2015
- N.Horvath: La Tentation d'exister, Artistic LP AH AH AH Éditions – LBDLC, 2015
- N.Horvath: Acedia, Digital Demerara Records, 2016
- Dapnom: Paralipomènes à la Divine Comédie, CD Mors Ultima Ratio, 2011
- Dapnom: Live in Paris, Tape Ogmios Underground, 2010
- Dapnom + Melek-Tha: Omnium Finis Imminent, 2 CD Fire Of Fire Records, 2008
- Dapnom + Kenji Siratori: Nhir-otkiv Yima'k, CD Sabbathid Records, 2008
- Dapnom: 魔界, Tape Sabbathid Records, 2007
- Dapnom: Baalberith, Pro CDR Le Mal Dominant, 2007
- Dapnom: ...Unio Mystica, Tape Ars Funebris records, 2007
- Dapnom: Actes Préalables, CD Insidious Poinsoning Records, 2007
- Dapnom: Verklärte Nacht, CD Sonic Tyranny Records, 2006
- Dapnom: Mind Control, CD Sonic Tyranny Records, Tape Regimental Records, 2006
- Dapnom: Potestatem, 6 Tape, Akedia Rex, 2006
- Dapnom: S'oho... Aiy uhe en-oghg (a.p. III), Tape SP Records, 2006
- Dapnom: Ert Brvueazv 0 (a.p. I), Tape Gravestench, 2005
- Dapnom: Regwoisvokwos Gwhenmi Welminti, Tape Necrocosm Records, 2005
- Dapnom: Melenoiserkwos, Tape Basilisk records, 2005
- Dapnom: ∅, Tape Sadolust records, 2005
- Dapnom: Dvoeskreb, Tape Meurtre Noir Records, 2005
- Dapnom: 1951-N "Black Abstract Expressionism", Tape Insidious Poisoning rec, 2005
- Dapnom: De Profundis, Tape Antihumanism Records, 2004
- A.E.P.: Harawata no Shouki, Tape Titan Woods, 2011
- A.E.P. + Vinterriket: Praeludia Lucis Noctis, CD Asphyxiate Recordings, Tape Ars Funebris Records, 2007
- A.E.P. + Black Seas of Infinity: Kâmarûpa, CD Sonic Tyranny Production, 2007, Tape Ravenheart, 2006
- A.E.P.: Тёмные Огни, Pro CDR Art of Anticreation, Tape Symbollic prod, 2006
- A.E.P.: Aïn, Tape Tour De Garde, 2006
- A.E.P.: THIS IS NOT MUSIC, Tape Fogart Productions, 2006
- A.E.P.: Les Montagnes Hallucinées, Pro CDR Occultum Production, 2006
- A.E.P.: Noir voyage obstrué de rencontres difformes, Tape Infernal Kommando, 2006
- A.E.P.: Demos 1 + 2, Tape Todestrieb records, 2005
- A.E.P.: ...Kaiwelos, Tape Insikt, 2005
- A.E.P.: Nos'leh Cifnoy-räam, Tape MN Records, 2005
- A.E.P.: Enifubos..., Tape MN Records, 2005

== Vidéography ==
- Erik Satie, entre les notes, documentary by Grégory Monro (2025)
- Nuit Erik Satie : Nicolas Horvath / Live at the Philharmonie de Paris (DVD published by NAXOS on their Grand Piano Collection) réalisé par Thierry Villeneuve
- Régis Campo : Strange Beautiful Music, documentary by Quentin Lazzarotto (2021)

== Shows ==
- Alex Vizorek & Nicolas Horvath: FéErique SATIE
- Brigitte Lecordier & Nicolas Horvath: Le Noël de Léon (Christmas story written by Yves Lecordier - 1001 Notes)
- Marine Michon, Claire-Cécile & Nicolas Horvath: 1001 Nuances de Clown (order from the 1001 Notes Festival - 2024)

== Transcriptions ==
- Romain Dasnoy : Fractal Piano (Lost Fractal (Emergence), Metamorphic Recursion, Timefold, Forgotten Memory, Fading Creation, Fractal Piano, Echoes of the Void, Cyclic Motion, Inverted Mechanics, Last Resonance, Lost Fractal (Collapse))
- SNK Corporation - Art of Fighting, Garou : Mark of the Wolves, Guerilla Wars, The King of Fighters, The Last Blade, Metal Slug, Prehistoric Isle in 1930, Samurai Shodown, The Super Spy, Time Soldiers, Vanguard (SNK Collective / Wayo Productions)
- Alcest - Souvenirs d'un autre monde, Kodama, Sur l'océan couleur de fer, Autre Temps, Délivrance (Prophecy Production)
- Soror Dolorosa - Mond from Broken Love (Prophecy Production)
- Tim Burton - Alice in Wonderlands, Batman, Batman Returns, Beetlejuice, Big Fish, Charlie and the Chocolate Factory, Corpse Bride, Dark Shadow, Dumbo, Edward Scissorhands, Frankenweenie, Nightmare before Christmas, Pee-wee's Big Adventure, Sleepy Hollow, Wednesday (Danny Elfman / Wayo Productions)
- Little Big Adventure - Piano Suite (Philippe Vachey / Wayo Productions)
- Magician Lord Piano Collection (SNK Collective / Wayo Productions)
- Studio Ghibli - The Lost Paradise, Heartbroken Kiki, Sooth Spirit, Mother Sea, Madness (Joe Hisaishi / Wayo Productions)
- Final Fantasy - One Winged Angel – Virtuoso Version (Nobuo Uematsu); Tina's Rhapsody (Nobuo Uematsu - L'histoire de Final Fantasy VI; Pix'n Love Editions)
- 1er Mouvement de la Faust Symphonie (Franz Liszt / Edition Muzik Fabrique)

== Music Publishing ==
- Karl August Hermann: Intégrale de l'œuvre pour piano solo (3 volumes / Edition Muzik Fabrique - 2024)

== Radio Shows ==
- Musiques Actuelles #14 – Le Monde de Kirill Zaborov
- Musiques Actuelles #13 – Le Monde de Christophe Héral
- Musiques Actuelles #12 – Le Monde de Guillaume Tiger
- Musiques Actuelles #11 – Le Monde de Vordb Na.Riidr
- Musiques Actuelles #10 – Le Monde de Nicolas Chaccour
- Musiques Actuelles #09 – Le Monde de Pierrette Mari
- Musiques Actuelles #08 – Le Monde de Melaine Dalibert
- Musiques Actuelles #07 – Le Monde de Guy Printemps
- Musiques Actuelles #06 – 11 albums de l'année 2022
- Musiques Actuelles #05 – Le Monde de Gerard Pape
- Musiques Actuelles #04 – Le Monde de Nicolas Bacri
- Musiques Actuelles #03 – Le Monde d'Andy Julia
- Musiques Actuelles #02 – Le Monde de Denis Levaillant
- Musiques Actuelles #01 – Le Monde d'Hélios Azoulay

== Marathon Concerts ==
- December 14, 2025 – From Sunrise to Sunset, London, The Colet House; 9 hours 30 minutes.
- December 7, 2025 – Complete Erik Satie piano music, Le Mans, Ecole supérieure des Beaux-Arts; 8 hours.
- September 16–17, 2023 – Jean Catoire Night, in collaboration with the OCEIM Ensemble, Strasbourg, Palais des Fêtes; total duration: 12 hours.
- June 26–27, 2021 – "Like a flash of lightning that hurries suddenly from the sky to the earth" by Eva-Maria Houben, Milan, BASE; total duration: 14 hours.
- August 3–4, 2019 – A Piano Under the Stars, Misy-sur-Yonne, towpath; total duration: 12 hours.
- April 28, 2019, Complete 15 "Klavierstücke" for piano by Karlheinz Stockhausen, Nantes, Institute for Advanced Studies; total duration: 5 hours 30 minutes.
- November 30–31, 2018 – Complete solo piano music by Philip Glass, Bordeaux, CAPC; total duration: total duration: 11 hours.
- October 20–21, 2018 – Complete works of Erik Satie (including "Vexations"), Le Mans, École Supérieure des Beaux-Arts, Nicolas Horvath; total duration: 24 hours
- October 5–6, 2018 – Complete solo piano music by Erik Satie, Paris, Philharmonie Salle Boulez, total duration: total duration: 8 hours.
- October 4–5, 2018 – Complete solo piano music by Erik Satie, Palermo, Teatro Massimo; total duration: total duration: 8 hours.
- August 4–5, 2018 – A Piano Under the Stars, Misy-sur-Yonne, towpath; total duration: total duration: total duration: 12 hours.
- May 19–20, 2018 – Complete Solo Piano Music by Erik Satie, Milan, Six Gallery; total duration: total duration: total duration: 8 hours.
- March 18, 2018 – Complete Solo Piano Music by Erik Satie, Nantes, Institute for Advanced Studies; total duration: total duration: 8 hours.
- September 24–25, 2017 – "GlassWorlds" (100 Tributes to Philip Glass & Complete Philip Glass), Middelburg, Zeeuwse Concertsaal; total duration: 14 hours.
- September 15–16, 2017 – "Vexations" by Erik Satie, Le Mans, School of Fine Arts; total duration: total duration: 24 hours.
- May 21–22, 2017 – Complete Solo Piano Music by Philip Glass, Milan, Fondazione Prada; total duration: 10 hours.
- May 20–21, 2017 – Complete solo piano music by Philip Glass, Nice, Galerie de la Marine; total duration: 6 hours.
- April 1–2, 2017 – Complete solo piano music by Philip Glass, Nantes, Manoir de Procé; total duration: 10 hours.
- January 30, 2017 – Complete solo piano music by Philip Glass, New York, Carnegie Hall; total duration: 5 hours.
- December 14–15, 2016 – "Vexations" by Erik Satie, Paris, Musée des Arts Décoratifs; total duration: 12 hours.
- October 1–2, 2016 – Complete solo piano music by Philip Glass, Paris, Philharmonie de Paris - Salle Boulez; total duration: 11 hours.
- December 5–6, 2015 – Complete solo piano music by Philip Glass, Pessac, Salle Bellegrave; total duration: 7 hours.
- November 15–16, 2015 – "GlassWorlds" (100 Tributes to Philip Glass & Complete Philip Glass Works), Odessa; total duration: 14 hours.
- September 6–7, 2015 – "GlassWorlds" (100 Tributes to Philip Glass & Complete Philip Glass Works), Orlando; total duration: 14 hours.
- July 1–2, 2015 – "Vexations" by Erik Satie, Paris, Radio France, Nicolas Horvath; total duration: 24 hours.
- January 25–26, 2015 – Complete piano works by Philip Glass, Rennes, FRAC; total duration: 7 hours.
- December 31, 2014, to January 1, 2015 – "GlassWorlds" (100 Tributes to Philip Glass & Complete Philip Glass Works), Kyiv, Museum of National Treasures; total duration: 13 hours.
- November 29–30, 2014 – Complete Piano Works of Philip Glass, Minsk, House of the International Meetings; total duration: 6 hours.
- June 29, 2014 – GlassWorlds (100 Tributes to Philip Glass), Collioure, Protestant Temple, total duration: 5 hours 30 minutes.
- June 17–18, 2014 – "Vexations" by Erik Satie, Monaco, Galerie Entrepôt, Nicolas Horvath; total duration: 24 hours.
- April 11–12, 2014 – GlassWorlds (100 Tributes to Philip Glass & Complete Philip Glass Works), Paris, Palais de Tokyo; total duration: 13 hours.
- February 15–16, 2014 – Minimal Piano Night, Kyiv, House of the Architects; total duration: 13 hours.
- July 5–6, 2013 – Canto Ostinato XL, Monaco, Galerie Entrepôt; total duration: 7 hours 30 minutes.
- June 27–28, 2013 – Minimal Piano Night, Collioure, Protestant Temple; total duration: 12 hours.
- May 25–26, 2013 – Complete Piano Works of Philip Glass, Kyiv, Book Arsenal; total duration: 5 hours 30 minutes.
- December 12–13, 2012 – Erik Satie's "Vexations," Paris, Palais de Tokyo, Nicolas Horvath; total duration: 35 hours.
- December 9–10, 2012 – Complete Piano Works of Philip Glass, Villeurbanne, Espace Tonkin; total duration: 5 hours and 30 minutes.
- October 6–7, 2012 – Complete Piano Works of Philip Glass, Paris, Nave of the Collège des Bernardins; total duration: 5 hours and 30 minutes.
- June 28–29, 2012 – Night of Minimal and Experimental Piano, Collioure, Protestant Temple; total duration: 12 hours.
- December 10–11, 2011 – "Vexations" by Erik Satie, Villeurbanne, Church of Sainte Thérèse; total duration: 13 hours.
- December 4, 2011 – Satie Marathon, Church of Saint Martin de Fenouillet; total duration: 6 hours.
- December 3, 2011 – Complete Works of Erik Satie, Perpignan, Municipal Theater; total duration: 9 hours.
- December 2–3, 2011 – Complete Works of Erik Satie (including "Vexations"), Honfleur, Danielle Bourdette-Gorzkowski Gallery; total duration: 18 hours.
- June 28–29, 2011 – Night of Minimal and Experimental Piano, Collioure, Protestant Temple; total duration: 10 hours and 30 minutes.
- June 26, 2011 – Erik Satie's "Vexations," Lagny-sur-Marne, Conservatory of Music; otal duration: 10 hours and 30 minutes.
- June 21–22, 2011 – Erik Satie's "Vexations," Rennes, La Touche Community Center; otal duration: 15 hours and 30 minutes.
- April 7–8, 2011 – Erik Satie's "Vexations," Prague, Ruby Studio; otal duration: 14 hours.
- April 5–6, 2011 – Night of Minimal & Experimental Piano, Prague, Hlahol's Hall; total duration: 5 hours and 30 minutes.
- April 15–16, 2011 – Erik Satie's "Vexations," Monaco, Galerie Entrepôt; otal duration: 24 hours.
- December 4, 2010 – Vexations by Erik Satie, Perpignan: Perpignan Congress Centre; otal duration: 15 hours.

== Publications ==
=== Booklets ===
- 2012: Franz Liszt – Christus, (Liszt – Christus, Hortus Edition H100)
- 2015: Glassworlds, (GlassWorlds Vol.1, Naxos – Grand Piano GP677)
- 2015: Philip Glass Complete Piano Etudes, (Livret: GlassWorlds Vol.2, Naxos – Grand Piano GP690)
- 2016: The Metamorphose, (GlassWorlds Vol.3, Naxos – Grand Piano GP691)
- 2016: On Love, (GlassWorlds Vol.4, Naxos – Grand Piano GP692)
- 2016: Enlightenment, (GlassWorlds Vol.5, Naxos – Grand Piano GP745)
- 2019: AMERICA, (GlassWorlds Vol.6, Naxos – Grand Piano GP817)
- 2021: co-authored with Deborah Hayes, Anne-Louise Brillon de Jouy's piano sonatas, (Brillon de Jouy - The Piano Sonatas Rediscovered, Naxos – Grand Piano GP872-73)
- 2021: co-authored with Deborah Hayes, Hélène de Montgeroult's piano sonatas (Hélène de Montgeroult - Complete Piano Sonatas, Naxos – Grand Piano GP885-86)

=== Articles ===
- 2016: Jaan Rääts biography, (Programme des Activités Culturelles et Promotionnelles du Conseil de l'Europe, Conseil de l'Europe)
- 2018: Dr Jekyll & Mister Hyde, (Régis Campo, Musique de l'émerveillement. Aedam Musicae)
- 2019: Alvin Lucier's Music for Piano with Slow Sweep Pure Wave Oscillators XL, (Notice de concert - Deep Listen. Festival Musica Strasbourg)
- 2021: On Jean Catoire piano music (Booklet: Jean Catoire Complete piano music Nicolas Horvath Discoveries (Collection 1001 Notes / ACEL)
- 2022: co-authored with Marie-Lise Babonneau, Régis Campo, David Christoffel and Yannis Constantinides, Parachever (Les Annales de Metaclassique - Vol. II. Aedam Musicae)

=== French translations ===
- 2015: Glassworlds, (GlassWorlds Vol.1, Naxos – Grand Piano GP677)
- 2015: Les Études pour piano de Philip Glass, (Livret: GlassWorlds Vol.2, Naxos – Grand Piano GP690)
- 2016: La Métamorphose, (GlassWorlds Vol.3, Naxos – Grand Piano GP691)
- 2016: Amour à mourir, (GlassWorlds Vol.4, Naxos – Grand Piano GP692)
- 2016: L’illumination, (GlassWorlds Vol.5, Naxos – Grand Piano GP745)
- 2017: Erik Satie - Complete Piano Work, New Salabert Edition Vol.1, (Naxos – Grand Piano GP761)
- 2018: Erik Satie - Complete Piano Work, New Salabert Edition Vol.2, (Naxos – Grand Piano GP762)
- 2018: Erik Satie - Complete Piano Work, New Salabert Edition Vol.3, (Naxos – Grand Piano GP763)
- 2019: AMERICA, (GlassWorlds Vol.6, Naxos – Grand Piano GP817)
- 2019: Erik Satie - Complete Piano Work, New Salabert Edition Vol.4, (Naxos – Grand Piano GP823)

=== English translations ===
- 2021: Jean Catoire: Complete Piano Works all volumes, Digital Collection 1001 Notes / 28CD ACEL – Nicolas Horvath Discoveries
- 2022: William Susman: Quiet Rhythms Book I, Digital Collection 1001 Notes / CD Belarca – Nicolas Horvath Discoveries
- 2022: Morteza Shirkoohi: Divine Thoughts, Digital Collection 1001 Notes / CD ACEL – Nicolas Horvath Discoveries
- 2022: Dennis Johnson: November, Digital Collection 1001 Notes / 6CD ACEL– Nicolas Horvath Discoveries
- 2022: John Cage: In a Landscape, Digital Collection 1001 Notes / CD ACEL – Nicolas Horvath Discoveries
- 2022: Hans Otte: The Book of Sounds, Digital Collection 1001 Notes / 2CD ACEL – Nicolas Horvath Discoveries
- 2022: Tom Johnson: One Hour for Piano, Digital Collection 1001 Notes / CD ACEL – Nicolas Horvath Discoveries
- 2022: Melaine Dalibert: En Abyme, Digital Collection 1001 Notes / CD ACEL – Nicolas Horvath Discoveries
- 2022: Tom Johnson: The Chord Catalogue, Digital Collection 1001 Notes / 4CD ACEL – Nicolas Horvath Discoveries
