= Mark Helias =

American double bassist and composer (born 1950)

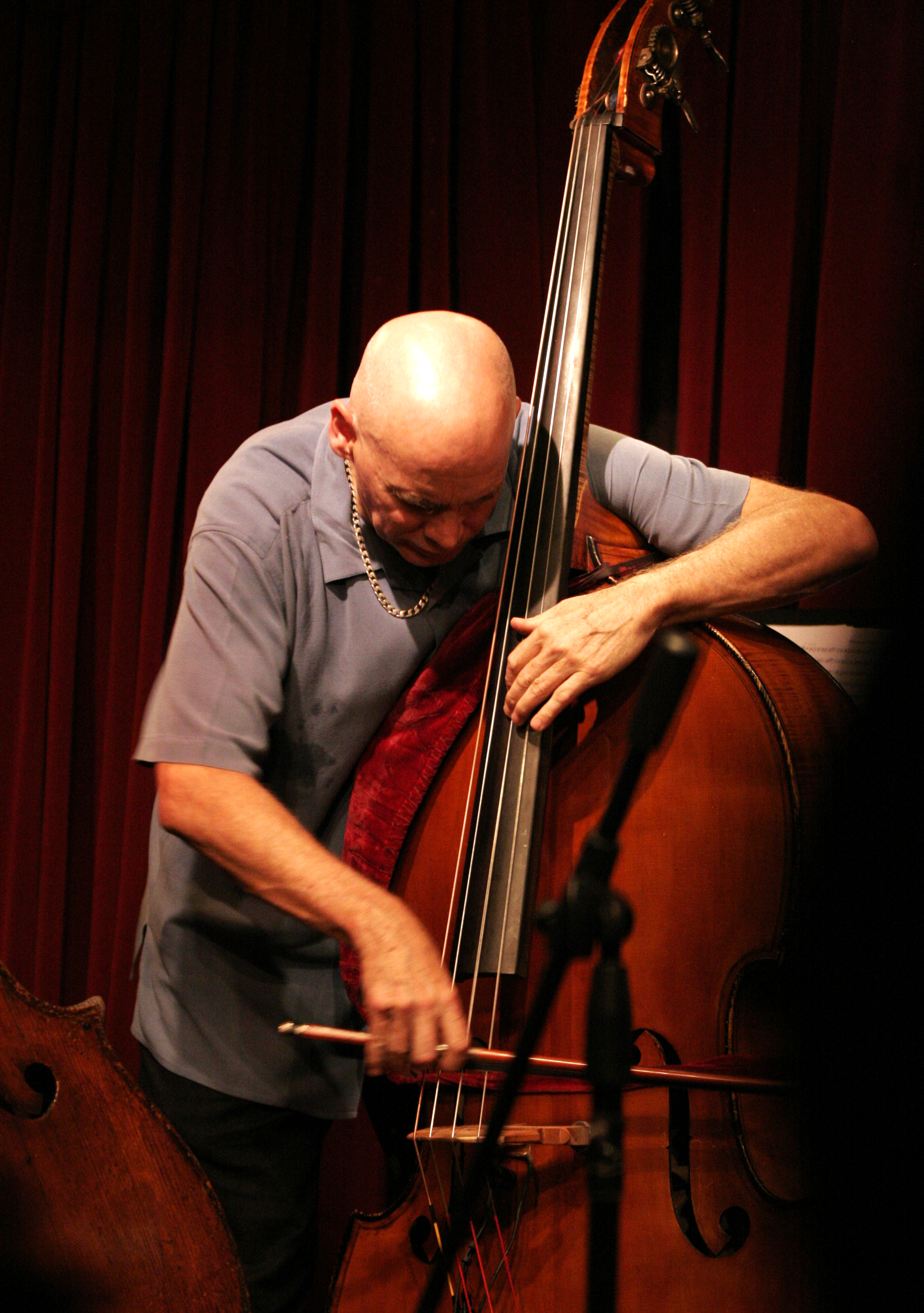
- Helias at Cornelia street cafe, July 2, 2010

Background information
- Born: October 1, 1950 (age 74); New Brunswick, New Jersey, United States
- Genres: Jazz, Avant-garde jazz, Free jazz, Free improvisation
- Occupation(s): Musician, composer, educator
- Instrument: Double bass
- Labels: Enja, Radio Legs, Koch, Marge, GM
- Website: MarkHelias.com/

Mark Helias (born October 1, 1950) is an American double bass player and composer born in New Brunswick, New Jersey.

He started playing the double bass at the age of 20, and studied with Homer Mensch at Rutgers University from 1971 to 1974, then at Yale School of Music from 1974 to 1976. He teaches at Sarah Lawrence College, The New School, and SIM (School for Improvised Music).

Helias has performed with a wide variety of musicians, first and foremost with trombonist Ray Anderson, with whom he led the ironic 1980s avant-funk band Slickaphonics, and a trio with Gerry Hemingway on drums, formed in the late 1970s, later named BassDrumBone. Helias has also performed with members of Ornette Coleman's band, Don Cherry, Dewey Redman, and Ed Blackwell, and with musicians affiliated with the AACM, such as Anthony Braxton and Muhal Richard Abrams.

Since 1984 Mark Helias has released twelve recordings under his own name and further albums leading the archetypal improvising trio Open Loose since the late 1990s. The group comprises Helias on bass, first Ellery Eskelin, then Tony Malaby on tenor saxophone and Tom Rainey on drums.

== Recognition/Awards ==
- 2010 - American Composers Orchestra Reading Commission,
- 2007 - Chamber Music America Grant for New Works,
- 2006 - Distinguished Alumnus Award Livingston College,
- 1991 - Meet the Composer/Reader's Digest Commission,
- 1990, 1993, 1995, 1996, 2000 - Arts International Travel Grant,
- 1988, 1994 - NYFA Grant in Music Composition,
- 1984, 1985, 1989, 1990, 1991, 1995 - NEA Grant in Jazz Performance,
- 1981 - CAPS Grant in Music Composition,

== Discography ==
=== As leader ===
- Music For Big Band (Radio Legs, 2020)
- Roof Rights (Radio Legs, 2020)
- Available Light (Radio Legs, 2020)
- Fictionary (GM Recordings, 1998)
- Loopin' the Cool (Enja, 1995)
- Attack the Future (Enja, 1992)
- Desert Blue (Enja, 1989)
- The Current Set (Enja, 1987)
- Split Image (Enja, 1984)

With Open Loose

- The Third Proposition (Radio Legs, 2020)
- The Signal Maker (Intakt, 2015)
- Explicit – Live at the Sunset (Marge, 2011)
- Strange Unison (Radio Legs, 2008)
- Atomic Clock (Radio Legs, 2006)
- Verbs of Will (Radio Legs, 2004)
- New School (Enja, 2001) Tony Malaby replaces Eskelin
- Come Ahead Back... (E1/Koch Jazz, 1998) with Ellery Eskelin and Tom Rainey

=== Collaborations ===
Duo with Jane Ira Bloom

- Some Kind of Tomorrow (Radiolegs Music, 2020)

With Sophia Domancich and Andrew Cyrille

- Courtepointe - Live at the Sunside (Marge, 2012)

With Terrence McManus and Gerry Hemingway

- Transcendental Numbers (NoBusiness, 2011)

With Michael Moore, Alex Maguire, and Han Bennink

- White Widow (Ramboy, 2001)

With Mark Dresser

- The Marks Brothers (De Werf, 2000)

With Daniele D'Agaro and U.T. Gandhi

- Gentle Ben (Nota, 1999)

With Christy Doran, Bobby Previte, Gary Thomas

- Corporate Art (JMT, 1991)

With Slickaphonics

- Live (Teldec, 1988)
- Check Your Head at the Door (Teldec, 1986)
- Humatomic Energy (Blue Heron, 1985)
- Modern Life (Enja, 1984)
- Wow Bag (Enja, 1982)

With Ray Anderson and Gerry Hemingway a.k.a. BassDrumBone

- The Long Road - BassDrumBone with Jason Moran and Joe Lovano (Auricle, 2017)
- The Other Parade (Clean Feed, 2011)
- The Line Up (Clean Feed, 2006)
- March of Dimes (Data, 2002)
- (Hence the Reason) (Enja, 1997)
- Wooferlo (Soul Note, 1989) first album as BassDrumBone
- Cooked to Perfection (Auricle, 1999; Compilation of rec. from 1986, 1987, and 1996)
- You Be (Minor Music, 1986)
- Oahspe (Auricle, 1979)

=== As sideman ===
With Ralph Alessi and Modular Theatre

- Open Season (RKM Music, 2008)

With Barry Altschul

- Irina (Soul Note, 1983)
- Brahma (Sackville, 1980)
- Somewhere Else (Moers Music, 1979)

With Ray Anderson

- Wishbone (Justin Time, 1991)
- Right Down Your Alley (Soul Note, 1984)

With the Ed Blackwell Project

- What It Is? Ed Blackwell Project Vol. 1 (Enja, 1993)
- What It Be Like? Ed Blackwell Project Vol. 2 (Enja, 1994)

With Jane Ira Bloom

- Wild Lines: Improvising Emily Dickenson (Outline, 2017)
- Early Americans (Outline, 2016)
- Wingwalker (Outline, 2011)
- Mental Weather (Outline, 2008)

With Anthony Braxton

- Six Compositions: Quartet (Antilles, 1982)
- Quintet (Basel) 1977 (hatOLOGY, 2001)
- Quintet (Moers) 1977 - 05.30 (Braxton Bootleg, 2013)
- Trillium J (New Braxton House, 2016)

With Don Cherry

- Live at the Bracknell Jazz Festival, 1986 (BBC, 2002)

With Marilyn Crispell

- Storyteller (ECM, 2003)

With Franco D'Andrea

- Sei brani inediti (Red, 1991)
- No Idea of Time (Red, 1984)
- My One and Only Love (Red, 1983)

With Anthony Davis

- Song for the Old World (India Navigation, 1978)

With Benoît Delbecq Unit

- Benoît Delbecq and Fred Hersch Double Trio - Fun House (Songlines, 2013)
- Phonetics (Songlines, 2005)

With Paul Dunmall Sun Quartet

- Ancient and Future Airs (Clean Feed, 2009)

With Marty Ehrlich

- The Long View (Enja, 2002)
- Dark Woods Ensemble – Sojourn (Tzadik, 1999)
- Dark Woods Ensemble – Live Wood (Music & Arts, 1997)
- Dark Woods Ensemble – Just Before the Dawn (New World, 1995)

With Ricardo Gallo's Tierra de Nadie

- The Great Fine Line (Clean Feed, 2011)

With Dennis González NY Quartet

- Dance of the Soothsayer's Tongue (Live at Tonic) (Clean Feed, 2007)
- NY Midnight Suite (Clean Feed, 2004)

With Jerome Harris

- Algorithms (Minor, 1986)

With Gerry Hemingway

- The Whimbler (Clean Feed, 2005)
- Outerbridge Crossing (Sound Aspects, 1989)
- Kwambe (Auricle, 1978)

With Peter Herborn

- Traces of Trane (JMT, 1992)

With David Lopato

- Inside Outside (Enemy, 1991)

With Joe Lovano

- Rush Hour (Blue Note, 1994)

With Michael Moore

- Bering (Ramboy, 1998)
- Chicoutimi (Ramboy, 1994)
- Home Game (Ramboy, 1992)

With Simon Nabatov

- The Master and Margarita (Leo, 2001)
- Tough Customer (Enja, 1993)

With Operazone (Bill Laswell-Alan Douglas-Karl Berger-Project)

- The Redesign (Knitting Factory, 2000)

With Jim Pepper

- Comin' and Goin' (Europa, 1983)

With Bobby Previte

- Music of the Moscow Circus (Gramavision, 1991)

With Enrico Rava

- Flat Fleet (Philology, 2005)

With Dewey Redman

- The Struggle Continues (ECM, 1982)
- Musics (Galaxy, 1978)
- Soundsigns (Galaxy, 1978)

With Joe Rosenberg

- Do What We Must Do (CIMP, 2002)

With Roswell Rudd and Heather Masse

- August Love Song (Red House, 2016)

With Samo Šalamon

- Government Cheese (Fresh Sound New Talent, 2007; rec. 2004)
- Two Hours (Fresh Sound New Talent, 2006; rec. 2004)

With Dave Schnitter

- Glowing (Muse, 1981)
