= Brahma (album) =

Studio album by Barry Altschul Trio
- Released: 1980
- Recorded: January 23, 1980
- Studio: RPM Studios, New York City
- Genre: Free jazz
- Length: 34:17
- Label: Sackville; 3023
- Producer: Bill Smith

Barry Altschul chronology
Be-Bop? (1979)	Brahma (1980)	For Stu (1981)

Brahma is an album by the Barry Altschul Trio, led by drummer Altschul, and featuring trombonist Ray Anderson and double bassist Mark Helias. It was recorded on January 23, 1980, at RPM Studios in New York City, and was released on vinyl later that year by Sackville Records. The album was remastered and reissued on CD in 2002.

This lineup of the Altschul trio recorded the live album Somewhere Else for the Moers label the previous year.

== Reception ==
Professional ratings
Review scores
Source	Rating
AllMusic	4/5 stars
The Penguin Guide to Jazz	3/4 stars
The Virgin Encyclopedia of Jazz	4/5 stars

In a review for AllMusic, Scott Yanow wrote: "In general, the music on this Sackville release is quite spontaneous and exploratory, but Anderson's playing sometimes hints strongly at earlier styles."

The authors of The Penguin Guide to Jazz Recordings stated that "it's nice to be reminded of... how arresting a player Altschul could be in this company. There is a lovely version of the ballad 'Irina'... and there are a few moments which point back to classic jazz, whether as a result of the trombonist's influence or Altschul's own explorations isn't clear."

A writer for Billboard commented: "This tiny combo produces an astonishing variety of pleasing sounds... It's all subtle jazz, unspectacular but rewarding."

Jazz Word's Ken Waxman called the album "historically important and musically impressive," and wrote: "swinging elements are... mixed with the risk-taking solos. These rhythmic components still go far beyond the conventional. Altschul's solo on the 17-minute title track may hit a groove, but his bulls-eye beat is amplified with timbre scrambles using mallets and sticks, ratamacues and drags on toms and snares, plus numerous interjections that bring in cymbal shaking, bell-tree resonation, waterphone scrapes, cow bell thwacks and shrills from slide whistles."

== Track listing ==
1. "Con Alma de Noche" (Ray Anderson) – 6:10
2. "Irina" (Barry Altschul) – 6:09
3. "Be Out S'Cool" (Barry Altschul) – 6:59
4. "Brahma" (Barry Altschul) – 16:54
5. "Lism" (Mark Helias) – 4:14

== Personnel ==
- Barry Altschul – drums, wood block, cymbal, cuica, waterphone, bells, shaker, whistling, cowbell, percussion
- Ray Anderson – tenor trombone, alto trombone, sousaphone, cowbell, whistling
- Mark Helias – double bass, cello
