= The Montreux/Berlin Concerts =

Live album by Anthony Braxton
- Released: 1977
- Recorded: July 20, 1975 and November 4 & 6, 1976
- Genre: Jazz
- Length: 86:54
- Label: Arista
- Producer: Michael Cuscuna

Anthony Braxton chronology
Dortmund (Quartet) 1976 (1976)	The Montreux/Berlin Concerts (1977)	Duets (1976)

The Montreux/Berlin Concerts is a double album by American jazz saxophonist Anthony Braxton recorded in 1975 and 1976 and released on the Arista label. Sides 1-3 were subsequently released on CD as Anthony Braxton Live in 1987 and all tracks were included on The Complete Arista Recordings of Anthony Braxton released by Mosaic Records in 2008.

== Reception ==
The Allmusic review by Scott Yanow awarded the album 5 stars stating "the interplay between these masterful musicians (making expert use of space and dynamics) sometimes borders on miraculous... this music is highly recommended and by itself demonstrates the greatness and uniqueness of Anthony Braxton's music".

Professional ratings
Review scores
Source	Rating
Allmusic	5/5 stars
The Rolling Stone Jazz Record Guide	4/5 stars

== Track listing ==
All compositions by Anthony Braxton.

1. "Z WBN D3B" - 8:50
2. "H-46M...B-BW4" - 3:07
3. "84 Deg. -Kelvin - 6" - 7:03
4. "72 Deg. -Kelvin..L" - 6:33
5. "337-4 46842 BFG-12" - 8:18
6. "CM=B05-7" - 5:29
7. "29 M 36" - 23:44 Omitted from the 1987 CD rerelease
- Recorded at the Montreux Jazz Festival in Switzerland on 20 July 1975 (tracks 1–3), and at the Berlin Jazz Days in Germany on November 4, 1976 (tracks 4–6) and November 6, 1976 (track 7).

== Personnel ==
- Anthony Braxton - sopranino saxophone, alto saxophone, contrabass clarinet, flute
- Kenny Wheeler - trumpet (tracks 1–3)
- George Lewis - trombone (tracks 4–7)
- Dave Holland - bass (tracks 1–6)
- Barry Altschul - drums, percussion, gongs (tracks 1–6)
- The Berlin New Music Group conducted by Gerald Humel (track 7)
