= Irina (album) =

Studio album by Barry Altschul Quartet
- Released: 1983
- Recorded: February 12, 1983
- Studio: Barigozzi Studio, Milan, Italy
- Genre: Jazz
- Length: 46:32
- Label: Soul Note; SN 1065
- Producer: Giovanni Bonandrini

Barry Altschul chronology
For Stu (1981)	Irina (1983)	That's Nice (1986)

Irina is an album by the Barry Altschul Quartet, led by drummer Altschul, and featuring saxophonist John Surman, trumpeter Enrico Rava, and double bassist Mark Helias. It was recorded on February 12, 1983, at Barigozzi Studio in Milan, Italy, and was released on vinyl later that year by Soul Note. The album was remastered and reissued on CD in 1998.

== Reception ==
Professional ratings
Review scores
Source	Rating
AllMusic	4/5 stars
MusicHound Jazz	4.5/5 stars
The Penguin Guide to Jazz	3/4 stars
The Rolling Stone Jazz & Blues Album Guide	3/5 stars
Tom Hull – on the Web	B+
The Virgin Encyclopedia of Jazz	3/5 stars

In a review for AllMusic, Scott Yanow wrote: "The music... finds the pianoless group sounding halfway between the Gerry Mulligan/Chet Baker Quartet and the late-'50s Ornette Coleman/Don Cherry group... The advanced and passionate solos... and the close communication between the four highly individual improvisers make this a notable and highly recommended release."

The authors of The Penguin Guide to Jazz Recordings stated: "This doesn't feel like fully three-dimensional Altschul. In the absence of a piano, he takes on an accompanist's role and does it very successfully, often leaving Helias to keep the count, though his own metre is rock steady. Rava and Surman don't quite gel early on and the album really comes alight only towards the end."

Steve Holtje of MusicHound Jazz called the album "Altschul's masterpiece as a leader," and noted that the musicians "walk the fine line between adding their own considerable inspiration yet not overwhelming the leader's concepts."

== Track listing ==
1. "Tap-A-Jack" (Ray Anderson) – 7:56
2. "Irina" (Barry Altschul) – 7:12
3. "Da Baron's Blues" (Barry Altschul) – 8:17
4. "Sips" (Barry Altschul) – 6:14
5. "Le Tango" (Mark Helias) – 7:42
6. "Jitterbug Waltz" (Fats Waller) – 9:11

== Personnel ==
- Barry Altschul – drums
- John Surman – baritone saxophone, soprano saxophone
- Enrico Rava – trumpet, flugelhorn
- Mark Helias – double bass
