= The 3dom Factor =

Studio album by Barry Altschul
- Released: 2013
- Recorded: June 15, 2012
- Studio: Sear Sound Studios, New York City
- Genre: Jazz
- Length: 50:17
- Label: TUM Records; CD 032
- Producer: Barry Altschul

Barry Altschul chronology
That's Nice (1986)	The 3dom Factor (2013)	BBK (2014)

The 3dom Factor is an album by drummer Barry Altschul on which he is joined by saxophonist Jon Irabagon and double bassist Joe Fonda. The trio's inaugural release, and Altschul's first session as a leader following a hiatus of roughly 25 years, it was recorded on June 15, 2012, at Sear Sound Studios in New York City, and was issued on CD in 2013 by TUM Records.

== Reception ==
Professional ratings
Review scores
Source	Rating
All About Jazz	3/5 stars
All About Jazz	5/5 stars
All About Jazz	4/5 stars
All About Jazz	4/5 stars
The Free Jazz Collective	4/5 stars
PopMatters	7/10 stars
Tom Hull – on the Web	A−

In a review for The New York Times, Nate Chinen wrote: "these musicians cohere mightily, swinging fast or free. The compositions, all but one by Mr. Altschul, suggest compact studies in durable melody... Mr. Altschul sounds acutely engaged, the force of his attention giving the album much of its power."

WNYC's Patrick Jarenwattananon noted that the musicians "straddle the lines between uptempo bebop and free improvisation with authority," and stated: "The 3dom Factor is ultimately Altschul's showcase, which he uses to demonstrate a wide range of styles... It's his music, too: The band reinterprets original compositions from throughout his discography... They're tuneful and worth paying attention to."

A reviewer for NPR's Fresh Air commented: "Altschul is great at mixing opposites: abstract melodic concepts with parade beats, open improvising and percolating swing. The album is the sort of comeback that reminds you how much good music the artist made the first time around."

John Garratt of PopMatters called the album "a combination of [Altschul]'s past and present," and remarked: "The new tunes are brand new and the old ones get young treatment... Altschul, Irabagon and... Fonda keep the train going full steam ahead."

Writing for Point of Departure, Brian Morton noted that it is "pretty clear that the Altschul of 2012 is a different fellow to the Altschul of 1972 or 1982... The exciting thing about this recording and some of its predecessors is how much Altschul has changed... it's possible to argue that Altschul is the great outsider of modern jazz; but he's just outside, he's in the courtyard or listening through the wall rather than off in some howling waste, crying over his marginalization. It's very affectionate music, this. Very clever and sly."

In an article for All About Jazz, Mark Corroto wrote: "The trio spins a mixture of inside and outside playing... Where another drummer would surrender time to free jazz, Altschul keeps the music rooted between post-bop and free." AAJ's Troy Collins described the album as "a compelling overview summarizing his entire career," and stated: "Bolstered by the laudable contributions of his sidemen, the record is both a modern masterpiece and a singular highlight in an impressive discography." AAJ writer Eyal Hareuveni called the album "highly enjoyable and inspiring," and highlighted Altschul's notable qualities: "The instant, authoritative, assertion of pulse and form, the ability to color it with wise and subtle usage of cymbals and rubbed drum heads, instinctual communication and emphatic rapport with musical partners and boundless energy." Reviewer Glenn Astarita commented: "With torrid flows, unanticipated detours and gobs of group-centric synergy, the trio looms as a tightly wound machine, and loosens it all up via spurious improvisational segments and fluid trajectories amid a consortium of cleverly articulated counter-maneuvers."

Ken Waxman of Jazz Word remarked: "this first-rate CD... proves that when it comes to the creative musician, age is just a number... it's accord and experience which account for the sympathetic interaction here... Cooperative fluency is apparent throughout... A sophisticated and conscientious drum stylist matched with a sympathetic band, the only noise associated with this session will be the huzzahs from satisfied listeners."

The Free Jazz Collective's Paul Acquaro wrote: "Altschul's playing is direct, driving and sets a new expectation of how percussionist can interact with the players mediating between pulse, melody and texture... it seems that Altschul is quite active again, and 3Dom Factor is a joyful statement and a nice entry in his discography."

== Track listing ==
"Ictus" was composed by Carla Bley. Remaining tracks were composed by Barry Altschul.

1. "The 3dom Factor" – 5:17
2. "Martin's Stew" – 5:59
3. "Irina" – 6:11
4. "Papa's Funkish Dance" – 4:52
5. "Be Out S'Cool" – 5:53
6. "Oops" – 5:46
7. "Just a Simple Song" – 5:50
8. "Ictus" – 2:24
9. "Natal Chart" – 4:43
10. "A Drummer's Song" – 3:22

== Personnel ==
- Barry Altschul – drums, percussion
- Jon Irabagon – tenor saxophone
- Joe Fonda – double bass
