= Musica Records =

Jazz record label

Musica Records was a jazz record label.

== Discography ==
#	Leader	Album	Year
3001	Archie Shepp	Bijou	1975
3002	Martial Solal & Joachim Kühn	Duo in Paris	1975
3003	Christian Escoudé	Réunion	1975
3004	Maurice Vander	Somewhere	
3005	Martial Solal	Plays Duke Ellington	1975
3006	Christian Escoudé & Jean-Charles Capon	Les 4 Éléments	1976
3007	Frédéric Sylvestre & Jacques Vidal	1er Grand Cru	80
3008	Bernard Lubat	Café l'Estaminet	1976
3009	Daniel Humair	Morning!	1972
3010	Michel Graillier	Ad Lib	1976
3011	Joe Albany	This Is For My Friends	1976
3012	Mal Waldron	Ursula	1969
3013	Archie Shepp	Witness	
3014	Pepper Adams & Barry Altschul	Be-Bop?	1979
3015	Georges Locatelli & Philippe Petit	Electric Guitar	
3016	Jimmy Rowles	Scarab	1978
3017	Christian Escoudé & Michel Graillier	Libra	1976
3018	Christian Ibanez	Feelings	1977
3019	Chris McGregor	Piano Song Vol 1	1977
3020	Philippe Petit	Parfums	1977
3021	Jacques Thollot	Resurgence	1977
3022	Christian Ibanez	In the Mood for Love	c.1977
3023	Chris McGregor	Piano Song Vol 2	1977
3024	Steve Lacy	Shots	1977
3025	Joe Albany	Plays George Gershwin & Bruce Lane	1976
3026	Jimmy Rowles	Nature Boy	1978
3027	Steve Grossman & Jean-François Jenny-Clark	New Moon	1978
3028	Philippe Petit	For All the Life, You Are in My Heart	1979
3029	Hamiet Bluiett	Bars	1977
3030	Al Haig	Al in Paris	1977
3031 3032	Various	Musica Jazz Catalogue	
3033	Chet Baker	Salsamba	1980
3034	Jimmy Gourley	No More	1981
3035	Al Haig	Parisian Thoroughfare	1977
3036			
3037	Marc Hemmeler	Walking in L.A.	1980
3043	Marc Hemmeler	Easy Does It	1981
3046	Tomás Gubitsch	Resistiendo a la Tormenta	1981
