= Vignettes (Marilyn Crispell album) =

Studio album by Marilyn Crispell
- Released: 2007
- Recorded: April 2007
- Genre: Avant-garde jazz
- Length: 68:23
- Label: ECM; ECM 2027
- Producer: Manfred Eicher

Marilyn Crispell chronology
Storyteller (2004)	Vignettes (2007)	One Dark Night I Left My Silent House (2010)

Vignettes is a solo album by American jazz pianist Marilyn Crispell recorded in April 2007 and released on ECM later that same year.

== Reception ==
Professional ratings
Review scores
Source	Rating
AllMusic	4/5 stars
All About Jazz #1	4.5/5 stars
All About Jazz #2	5/5 stars
All About Jazz #3	4.5/5 stars
The Guardian	3/5 stars

Writing for All About Jazz, Martin Gladu stated: "Drawing more on the tone-conscious, rubato balladeering of the Bleyian school rather than the cantankerous approach of Cecil Taylor... Crispell blends to her modernist factory a classical music informed eloquence and patina that is all her own. Mixing melodic free-ballads and spatial improvisations with all-over, gestural pieces, she maintains a high level of creativity in her playing throughout the sixty-minute plus session."

In a separate All About Jazz article, Budd Kopman remarked: "With Vignettes, Crispell continues to make beautiful music with an intensity that is breathtaking. The seventeen tracks sound of a piece, connected by a searching concentration, regardless of whether the individual piece is a free improvisation or one based on a composition... Vignettes is a new high point for Crispell as she continues her musical journey."

Another AAJ writer, John Kelman, stated: "Unerringly beautiful, Vignettes may be Crispell's most accessible recording to date. Still, with its innate lack of compromise, it's another compelling addition to a growing discography from the fearlessly open-minded Crispell that reveals new facets with each successive release."

The AllMusic review by Thom Jurek states, "Vignettes is a remarkable and moving recording—one that is timeless and honest, and communicates directly, literally, and poetically to the listener in a manner that is gentle yet pronounces its emotional weight without hesitation or self-consciousness."

In a review for Elsewhere, Graham Reid remarked: "Crispell stakes a strong claim to being one of the most daring yet considered pianists in improvised music today. Listening music, if you know what I mean."

John Fordham, in an article for The Guardian, wrote: "There are hints of Paul Bley's lyrical precision and Jarrett's song motifs in this private, slow-moving, but exquisitely articulated, dreamscape. The melodies often bloom, Bley-like, in short motifs on to which asides fall and accumulate, and though there are a few jagged, more intense pieces... most of the episodes are meditative."

In a review for Point of Departure, Stuart Broomer called the music "work of stunning economy and an emotional translucence in which keyboard touch reaches rare levels of communication," and wrote: "Crispell's intensity of focus lends this CD a special aura... It's music in which architectural rigor and a slow dance of liberation seem to define a common ground, music in which emotion is free to be both complex and direct."

== Track listing ==
All tracks are written by Marilyn Crispell, except as noted.

No.	Title	Writer(s)	Length
1.	"Vignette I"		2:19
2.	"Valse triste"		2:59
3.	"Cuida tu espíritu"	Jayna Nelson	7:47
4.	"Gathering Light"		5:54
5.	"Vignettes II"		2:29
6.	"Vignette III"		1:08
7.	"Vignette IV"		1:48
8.	"Vignette V"		1:36
9.	"Sweden"		7:04
10.	"Once"		3:55
11.	"Axis"		3:45
12.	"Vignette VI"		2:56
13.	"Vignette VII"		4:02
14.	"Ballade"		5:11
15.	"Time Past"
16.	"Stilleweg"	Arve Henriksen	6:18
17.	"Little Song for My Father"		3:21

== Personnel ==
- Marilyn Crispell – piano
