= Be-Bop? =

Studio album by Pepper Adams and Barry Altschul
- Released: 1979
- Recorded: June 1979
- Studios: Studio Ramses, Paris, France
- Genre: Jazz
- Labels: Musica; MUS. 3014
- Producer: Alain Boucanus

Pepper Adams chronology
Reflectory (1978)	Be-Bop? (1979)	The Master (1980)

Barry Altschul chronology
Somewhere Else (1979)	Be-Bop? (1979)	Brahma (1980)

Be-Bop?, is an album by baritone saxophonist Pepper Adams and drummer Barry Altschul which was recorded in Paris in 1979 and released on the French Musica label.In an interview with Peter Danson, Pepper stated "that the company attempted to make it look as if I am a co-leader, when I was merely a sideman and had no input into the musical sides of things. Or else, had I been a co-leader, it would have been different... Since I was hired as a sideman, paid as a sideman, had no quality control over the album, I think I am correct in being somewhat hacked at the people who were responsible..."

== Track listing ==
1. "Woody 'n' You" (Dizzy Gillespie) – 7:05
2. "Neuftemps" (Jean-Pierre Debarbat) – 11:04
3. 'You Can't Name Your Own Tune' (Barry Altschul) – 8:47
4. "Julian" (Pepper Adams, George Mraz) – 4:45
5. "Valse Celtique" (Adams) – 5:02

== Personnel ==
- Pepper Adams – baritone saxophone
- Barry Altschul – drums
- Jean-Pierre Debarbat – tenor saxophone
- Siegfried Kessler – piano
- Jacques Vidal – bass
