= Another Time/Another Place =

Studio album by Barry Altschul
- Released: 1978
- Recorded: March 13, 1978; April 14, 1978
- Studio: Rosebud Studio, New York City
- Genre: Free jazz
- Length: 43:51
- Label: Muse; MR 5176
- Producer: Barry Altschul, Michael Cuscuna

Barry Altschul chronology
You Can't Name Your Own Tune (1977)	Another Time/Another Place (1978)	Somewhere Else (1979)

Another Time/Another Place is an album by drummer Barry Altschul. It was recorded on March 13, 1978, and April 14, 1978, at Rosebud Studio in New York City, and was released later that year by Muse Records. On the album, Altschul appears in a variety of instrumental combinations, and is joined by saxophonist Arthur Blythe, trombonist Ray Anderson, pianist Anthony Davis, guitarist Bill DeArango, cellists Abdul Wadud and Peter Warren, and double bassists Dave Holland and Brian Smith.

== Reception ==
Professional ratings
Review scores
Source	Rating
AllMusic	4/5 stars
MusicHound Jazz	3.5/5 stars
The Rolling Stone Jazz Record Guide	5/5 stars
The Virgin Encyclopedia of Jazz	3/5 stars

In a review for AllMusic, Scott Yanow noted that "there is certainly plenty of variety" on the album, and stated: "all five selections work in their own unpredictable way."

The editors of The Rolling Stone Jazz Record Guide awarded the album a full 5 stars, and contributor John Swenson called the opening track, "Crepuscule: Suite for Monk," "a stunning tribute" to Thelonious Monk.

Writer and musician John Corbett wrote: "Much of the record's success revolves around Altschul's inventive writing, which has the complexity of classic [Anthony] Braxton but also a driving clarity and forthrightness." He singled out the opening track for praise, describing it as "splendid" and "free of the nasty clichés that now plague covers of Monk," and commenting: "It's just like Monk would have wanted."

== Track listing ==
1. "Crepuscule: Suite for Monk: Evidence/Crepuscule with Nellie/Epistrophy" (Thelonious Monk, arranged by Anthony Davis) – 14:27
2. "Chael" (Anthony Davis) – 8:53
3. "Traps" (Barry Altschul) – 2:15
4. "Pentacle" (Dave Holland) – 11:23
5. "Another Time/Another Place" (Barry Altschul) – 6:53

== Personnel ==
- Barry Altschul – drums, percussion
- Arthur Blythe – alto saxophone (track 1)
- Ray Anderson – trombone (tracks 1, 5)
- Anthony Davis – piano (tracks 1, 2, 5)
- Bill DeArango – guitar (track 1)
- Abdul Wadud – cello (tracks 2, 4)
- Peter Warren – cello (track 4)
- Dave Holland – double bass (track 4)
- Brian Smith – double bass (tracks 1, 4, 5)
