= Hot (Paul Bley album) =

Live album by Paul Bley
- Released: 1985
- Recorded: March 10, 1985
- Genre: Jazz
- Length: 44:12
- Label: Soul Note
- Producer: Giovanni Bonandrini

Paul Bley chronology
Questions (1985)	Hot (1985)	My Standard (1985)

Hot is a live album by Canadian jazz pianist Paul Bley recorded in 1985 and released on the Italian Soul Note label.

== Reception ==
The Allmusic review by Ron Wynn awarded the album 2½ stars, stating: "Excellent playing by Bley keeps things moving on this '85 date. The songs vary in quality, but Bley's moving, teeming solos are consistently impressive, and the production and sound are excellent."

Professional ratings
Review scores
Source	Rating
Allmusic	2.5/5 stars
The Penguin Guide to Jazz Recordings	3/4 stars

== Track listing ==
All compositions by Paul Bley except as indicated

1. "When Will the Blues Leave?" (Ornette Coleman) – 12:15
2. "Around Again" (Carla Bley) – 8:04
3. "How Long" – 5:03
4. "Mazatlan" – 10:50
5. "Syndrome" (Carla Bley) – 8:00

- Recorded at Lush Life in New York City on March 10, 1985.

== Personnel ==
- Paul Bley — piano
- John Scofield — guitar
- Steve Swallow — electric bass
- Barry Altschul — drums
