= Georgy Catoire =

Russian composer (1861–1926)

Georgy Lvovich Catoire (or Katuar; Russian: Гео́ргий Льво́вич Катуа́р; French: Georges Catoire; 27 April 1861 in Moscow – 21 May 1926) was a Russian composer of French descent.

== Life ==
Catoire studied piano in Berlin with Karl Klindworth (a friend of Richard Wagner) from whom he learned to appreciate Wagner. He became one of the few Russian 'Wagnerite' composers, joining the Wagner society in 1879.

Catoire graduated from Moscow University in mathematics in 1884 with outstanding honours. Upon graduating, he worked for his father's commercial business, only later becoming a full-time musician. It was at this time that Catoire began taking lessons in piano and basic harmony from Klindworth's student, V. I. Willborg. These lessons resulted in the composition of a piano sonata, some character pieces, and a few transcriptions. The most famous of these transcriptions was the piano transcription of the Introduction and Fugue from the First Orchestral Suite by Pyotr Ilyich Tchaikovsky (which Jurgenson later published at the recommendation of Tchaikovsky).

Not satisfied with his lessons with Willborg, Catoire went to Berlin in late 1885 to continue his lessons with Klindworth. Throughout 1886, he made brief trips to Moscow, and on one of these trips, he became acquainted with Tchaikovsky, who was greatly pleased with Catoire's set of piano variations. Tchaikovsky told the younger composer that, "it would be a great sin if he did not devote himself to composition". It was during this visit to Moscow that Catoire was introduced to the publisher Jurgenson. Catoire continued to study piano with Klindworth in Berlin throughout 1886, and simultaneously studied composition and theory with Otto Tiersch. Not satisfied with Tiersch's instruction, he began study with Philipp Bartholomé Rüfer. These lessons were also short-lived but resulted in the composition of a string quartet.

Catoire returned to Moscow in 1887. He declined to make a debut as a concert pianist, despite Klindworth's recommendation. Catoire met Tchaikovsky again, and he showed him (along with Nikolai Gubert and Sergei Taneyev) the string quartet he had written in Berlin for Rüfer. They all agreed that the work was musically interesting but lacking in texture. On Tchaikovsky's recommendation, Catoire went to Nikolai Rimsky-Korsakov in St Petersburg with a request for composition and theory lessons. In a letter to Rimsky-Korsakov, Tchaikovsky later described Catoire as, "very talented... but in need of serious schooling."

Rimsky-Korsakov gave Catoire one lesson before passing him to Anatoly Lyadov. This single lesson resulted in three piano pieces which were later published as Catoire's Op. 2. With Lyadov, Catoire studied counterpoint and wrote several pieces, including the lovely Caprice Op. 3. Lyadov's lessons concluded Catoire's formal schooling.

After returning to Moscow, Catoire became quite close to Anton Arensky. It was during this period that he wrote his second quartet (which he later rewrote as a quintet) and his cantata Rusalka, Op. 5, for solo voice, women's chorus and orchestra.

Catoire's family, friends, and colleagues were not sympathetic to his choice of career in composition, so in 1899, after a series of disappointments, he withdrew to the countryside and nearly gave up composing altogether. After two years of withdrawal from society, and having broken off almost all connections with musical friends, the opus 7 Symphony emerged in the form of a sextet as a result of this seclusion.

From 1919 Catoire was professor of composition in the Moscow Conservatory. He wrote several treatises on theory and composition during his tenure. Nikolai Myaskovsky had great regard for Catoire's students.

Today Catoire is very little known, although a few recordings exist of his piano works by Marc-André Hamelin, Anna Zassimova and Aleksandr Goldenweiser, while David Oistrakh and Laurent Breuninger recorded the complete violin music. His music has a certain semblance to the works of Tchaikovsky, the early works of Alexander Scriabin, and the music of Gabriel Fauré. Catoire's compositions demand not only high virtuosity but also an ear for instrumental colour.

Georgy Catoire was the uncle of author and musician Jean Catoire.

== Selected discography ==
- Poems for voice and piano. Yana Ivanilova, soprano, Anna Zassimova, piano. [Antes Edition, 2013]
- Chamber music (Room music, Hyperion)
- Piano music (Marc-Andre Hamelin, Hyperion)
- Works for Violin & Piano (Laurent Breuninger, Anna Zassimova. cpo 777 378-2)
- Piano Music (Anna Zassimova, Hänssler Classic, Antes Edition)

Morceaux Op. 6 Reverie, Contraste, Paysage. https://www.jpc.de/jpcng/classic/detail/-/art/sonata-reminiszeca/hnum/8333103 Prélude As-Dur [Composition du jeune age]; Op. 12, Quatre Morceaux: Chant du Soir, Méditation, Nocturne, Etude fantastique; Op. 34, Poème No.1 e-moll, Poeme Op. 34 No.2 C-Dur. Anna Zassimova. CD „Vergessene Weisen“ – Russian Music at the turn of the 20th Century. https://www.jpc.de/jpcng/classic/detail/-/art/Anna-Zassimova-Vergessene-Weisen/hnum/9989961

== Selected works ==
- Op. 1 Four Lieder: no.4, Lied for voice and piano on Lermontov's "Нет, не тебя так пылко я люблю..."
- Op. 2 Trois Morceaux for piano (pub. 1888): 1. Chant intime, E major 2. Loin du Foyer, E♭ major 3. Soiree d'Hiver D major
- Op. 3 Caprice for piano G♭ major (pub. 1886)
- Op. 4 String Quartet (lost; reworked into a String Quintet)
- Op. 5 "Rusalka" cantata for solo voice, women's chorus, orchestra (1888)
- Op. 6 Six Morceaux for piano (1897): 1. Rêverie, A major 2. Prélude, G♭ major, 3. Scherzo, B♭ major 4. Paysage, A major 5. Intermezzo, B♭ major 6. Contraste, B minor
- Op. 7 Symphony in C minor
- Op. 8 Vision (Etude) for piano (pub. 1897)
- Op. 9 Lieder: no.1 Lied for voice and piano on Apukhtin's "Опять весна"; no.4, Lied for voice and piano on Apukhtin's "Вечер"
- Op. 10 Cinq Morceaux for piano (pub. c1899): 1. Prelude 2. Prelude 3. Capriccioso 4. Reverie 5. Legende
- Op. 11 Lieder: no.1, Lied for voice and piano on Lermontov's "Песнь Русалки"; no.4, Lied for voice and piano on A. Tolstoy's "Не ветер, вея с высоты..."
- Op. 12 Quatre Morceaux for piano (pub. 1901): 1. Chant du soir 2. Meditation 3. Nocturne 4. Etude fantastique
- Op. 13 Mcyri (or Mtsyri) – Symphonic Poem (after Lermontov's "The Novice") (1899)
- Op. 14 Piano Trio in F minor (1900) (pub. 1902)
- Op. 15 Violin Sonata No.1 in B minor (in 3 movements)
- Op. 16 String Quintet in C minor (two violins, viola, and two cellos)
- Op. 17 Quatre Preludes for piano (pub. c1909)
- Op. 18 Three Poems for female Choir and Piano
- Op. 19 Three poems for Voice and Piano: no.1, Lied for voice and piano on F. Tiutchev's "Как над горячею золой..."; no.2, Lied for voice and piano on F. Tiutchev's "Silentium! (Молчание!)"
- Op. 20 Violin Sonata no. 2 "Poeme" (single-mvt work) (1906)
- Op. 21 Piano Concerto (1909) (pub. 1912)
- Op. 22 Six songs
- Op. 23 String quartet in F sharp minor (1909)
- Op. 24 Chants du Crepuscule for piano (pub. 1914)
- Op. 25 Prelude and Fugue in G minor for piano (pub. 1914)
- Op. 26 Elegie for violin and piano (pub. 1916)
- Op. 27 Vokal'nye ansambli for Voices and Piano
- Op. 28 Piano Quintet (1914)
- Op. 29 Seven Songs (1915): no.3, Lied for voice and piano on F. Tiutchev's "Сей день, я помню..."; no.6, Lied for voice and piano on F. Tiutchev's "Полдень"
- Op. 30 Valse for piano (pub. 1916)
- Op. 31 Piano Quartet in A minor (1916) (pub. c1928)
- Op. 32 Six poems by Balmont for voice and piano (1916) (pub. c1924)
- Op. 33 Six poems by Vladimir Soloviev for voice and piano (1916) (pub. c1924)
- Op. 34 Quatre Morceaux for piano (1,2,4: composed 1924-6; 3: composition of youth) (pub. 1928): 1. Poeme 2. Poeme 3. Prelude 4. Etude
- Op. 35 Tempest etude for piano (pub. 1928)
- Op. 36 Valse for piano (composition of youth) (pub. 1928)
- WoO Concert transcription of J.S. Bach's Passacaglia in C minor for piano (pub. 1889)

== Selected bibliography ==
- Anna Zassimova: Georges Catoire – Life, Music, Significance. [Deutsch]. Publishing House Ernst Kuhn, Berlin, 2011. [Georges Catoire – seine Musik, sein leben, seine Ausstrahlung. Verlag Ernst Kuhn – Berlin, 2011].
- Anna Zassimova: The Correspondence between P.I. Tschaikowsky and G.L. Catoire. [Deutsch] Edition 15 of the Tschaikowsky Society Tübingen, 2008 [Der Briefwechsel zwischen P.I. Tschaikowsky und Jegor (Georgij) L. Catoire. Deutsche Tschaikowsky Gesellschaft, Mitteilungen 15. Tübingen, 2008]
- Anna Zassimova: G. L. Catoire. Poem for Violin and Piano Op. 20. On Artistic Interpretation. [russ.] Editorial of the Moscow State Pedagogical University. Moscow, 2000
- Anna Zassimova: The Piano Works of G. L. Catoire in the Contemporary Pianist's Repertory. [russ.] Editorial of the Moscow State Pedagogical University. Moscow, 2001

== Sources ==
- "Катуар, Егор Львович" . Brockhaus and Efron Encyclopedic Dictionary (in Russian). 1906.
