= Storyteller (Marilyn Crispell album) =

Studio album by Marilyn Crispell
- Released: 26 April 2004
- Recorded: February 2003
- Studio: Avatar (New York, New York)
- Genre: Avant-garde jazz
- Length: 60:52
- Label: ECM; ECM 1847
- Producer: Manfred Eicher

Marilyn Crispell chronology
Amaryllis (2000)	Storyteller (2004)	Vignettes (2007)

Storyteller is an album by the Marilyn Crispell Trio, featuring rhythm section Mark Helias and Paul Motian, recorded in February 2003 and released on ECM April the following year.

== Reception ==
Professional ratings
Review scores
Source	Rating
AllMusic	4/5 stars
The Penguin Guide to Jazz Recordings	4/4 stars
The Village Voice	A−

Reviewing for The Village Voice in September 2004, Tom Hull said:

After two decades of comparisons to Cecil Taylor, her third ECM record is deliberate, cautious, almost pretty. Paul Motian could take credit for taming the shrew, but more likely it was her own growing interest in Bill Evans that led her to Motian. He wrote most of the pieces, but exerts little control. Indeed, his subtle drumming is almost untethered to Crispell's piano. But at this slow pace, the logic of her playing, her knack for surprising sequences that make perfect sense once you’ve heard them, is as dazzling as her speed ever was.

The AllMusic review by Thom Jurek awarded the album 4 stars stating "Storyteller is another triumph for Marilyn Crispell."

The authors of the Penguin Guide to Jazz Recordings awarded the album 4 stars, and stated, "Increasingly concerned with form, and increasingly inclined to temper intensity with control, this is at first hearing an unfamiliar Crispell... she has... selected some... older themes of Paul Motian's... as a tribute to his still underrated compositional skills... the group sound is perfectly balanced... Helias... keeping step with Motian's quiet urgency every inch of the way."

Writing for All About Jazz, John Kelman described the album as "a conversation where Crispell and Motian are active and highly interactive, with sparks sometimes flying, with Helias always present to propose a conciliatory viewpoint." He commented: "the album is a prime example of just how important each player is in creating a musical dynamic. Storyteller may lack the immediate spark of Amaryllis, but in its richer contrast between participants it still makes for compelling listening."

In a review for the BBC, Peter Marsh stated, "Storyteller sees Mark Helias taking over from [Gary] Peacock, but the song remains much the same. In fact, this trio pare down the music even more; there are times when the space between the notes ring as loud as the notes themselves... for the most part this is poised, thoughtful music that gently demands close listening... Sometimes bass and piano echo each other's phrases; they hang in the air like clouds, till blown away gently by Motian's pattering snare or the hiss of cymbals."

Writing for Clocks and Clouds, Beppe Colli remarked, "An excellent album, very well recorded, not at all difficult to listen to, Storyteller is the kind of album that makes me wonder about the real reasons why Crispell's name is not well-known."

== Track listing ==
All compositions by Marilyn Crispell except as indicated

1. "Wild Rose" - 4:13
2. "Flight of the Bluejay" (Paul Motian) - 4:39
3. "The Storyteller" (Motian) - 6:06
4. "Alone" - 4:45
5. "Harmonic Line" (Mark Helias) - 5:55
6. "Cosmology 2" (Motian) - 5:39
7. "Limbo" (Helias) - 6:54
8. "Play" (Motian) - 5:13
9. "The Sunflower" (Motian) - 3:59
10. "Cosmology 1" (Motian) - 4:02
11. "So Far, So Near" - 9:27

== Personnel ==
=== Marilyn Crispell Trio ===
- Marilyn Crispell – piano
- Mark Helias – bass
- Paul Motian – drums
