= For Stu =

Studio album by Barry Altschul
- Released: 1981
- Recorded: February 18, 1979
- Studio: Sound Ideas Studios, New York City
- Genre: Jazz
- Length: 40:40
- Label: Soul Note; SN 1015
- Producer: Barry Altschul

Barry Altschul chronology
Brahma (1980)	For Stu (1981)	Irina (1983)

For Stu is an album by the Barry Altschul Quartet, led by drummer Altschul, and featuring trombonist Ray Anderson, pianist Anthony Davis, and double bassist Rick Rozie. Dedicated to the memory of fellow drummer Stu Martin, it was recorded on February 18, 1979, at Sound Ideas Studios in New York City, and was released in 1981 by Soul Note.

== Reception ==
Professional ratings
Review scores
Source	Rating
AllMusic	4/5 stars
MusicHound Jazz	3/5 stars
The Penguin Guide to Jazz	3/4 stars
The Rolling Stone Jazz Record Guide	4/5 stars
Tom Hull – on the Web	B+
The Virgin Encyclopedia of Jazz	3/5 stars

In a review for AllMusic, Scott Yanow described the album as "well-rounded" and "a continually interesting set."

The authors of The Penguin Guide to Jazz Recordings called the album "an engagingly varied session, probably the best introduction to Altschul’s work," and wrote: "The title-track is a long, multi-dimensional exploration of rhythmic and tonal ideas, contrasting with Davis's typically thoughtful and oddly engaging 'Sleepwalker'. Altschul takes a solo spot on 'Drum Role', more interesting than these things usually are, but the highlight is a rousing interpretation of Mingus's 'Orange Was The Colour Of Her Dress, Then Silk Blues'."

== Track listing ==
1. "For Stu" (Barry Altschul) – 11:08
2. "Sleepwalker" (Anthony Davis) – 9:07
3. "Drum Role" (Barry Altschul) – 6:52
4. "Orange Was the Color of Her Dress, Then Silk Blues" (Charles Mingus) – 13:33

== Personnel ==
- Barry Altschul – drums
- Ray Anderson – trombone
- Anthony Davis – piano
- Rick Rozie – double bass
