= Duets (Roscoe Mitchell and Anthony Braxton album) =

Album by American jazz saxophonists Roscoe Mitchell and Anthony Braxton recorded in 1976

Studio album by Roscoe Mitchell and Anthony Braxton
- Released: 1978
- Recorded: December 13, 1976
- Genre: Jazz
- Length: 40:53
- Label: Sackville
- Producer: John Norris

Anthony Braxton chronology
The Montreux/Berlin Concerts (1975-76)	Duets (1978)	Quintet (Basel) 1977 (1977)

Roscoe Mitchell chronology
Nonaah (1977)	Duets (1978)	L-R-G / The Maze / S II Examples (1978)

Duets is an album by American jazz saxophonists Roscoe Mitchell and Anthony Braxton recorded in 1976 and released on the Sackville label.

== Reception ==
The Allmusic review by Brian Olewnick awarded the album 4 stars stating "this is a fine meeting between two of the most forward-looking thinkers and players in the music".

Professional ratings
Review scores
Source	Rating
Allmusic	4/5 stars
The Rolling Stone Jazz Record Guide	3/5 stars

== Track listing ==
1. "Five Twenty One Equals Eight" (Roscoe Mitchell) - 4:52
2. "Line Fine Lyon Seven" (Mitchell) - 1:15
3. "Seven Behind Nine Ninety-Seven Sixteen or Seven" (Mitchell) - 2:37
4. "Cards-Three and Open" (Mitchell) - 10:52
5. "Composition 40Q" (Anthony Braxton) - 6:46
6. "Composition 74B" (Braxton) - 6:35
7. "Composition 74A" (Braxton) - 7:56
- Recorded at Thunder Sound in Toronto, Canada on December 13, 1977

== Personnel ==
- Roscoe Mitchell, Anthony Braxton - reeds
