= Somewhere Else (Barry Altschul album) =

Live album by Barry Altschul Trio
- Released: 1979
- Recorded: June 2, 1979
- Venue: 8th Moers International New Jazz Festival
- Genre: Free jazz
- Label: Moers Music momu 01064
- Producer: Burkhard Hennen

Barry Altschul chronology
Another Time/Another Place (1978)	Somewhere Else (1979)	Be-Bop? (1979)

Somewhere Else is a live album by the Barry Altschul Trio, led by drummer Altschul, and featuring trombonist Ray Anderson and double bassist Mark Helias. It was recorded on June 2, 1979, at the 8th Moers International New Jazz Festival in Moers, Germany, and was released on vinyl later that year by Moers Music.

This lineup of the Altschul trio would go on to record the studio album Brahma for the Sackville label the following year.

== Reception ==
Professional ratings
Review scores
Source	Rating
AllMusic	3/5 stars
The Penguin Guide to Jazz	2/4 stars

In a review for AllMusic, Scott Yanow wrote: "The four lengthy originals... have their moments, but there are also meandering sections... Most of the sparks are provided by the virtuosic and eccentric Anderson; Helias has a strong bowed spot on the episodic 'Martin's Stew,' which is easily the strongest performance of the four."

The authors of The Penguin Guide to Jazz Recordings described the album as "a dialogue of the deaf," and commented: "Trios of this conformation are always difficult to modulate effectively. What happens here is that three players with strongly rhythmic conceptions of their own manage to cancel each other out."

== Track listing ==
1. "Somewhere Else" (Barry Altschul) – 13:30
2. "Slickaphonic Shuffle" (Ray Anderson) – 9:38
3. "Onea" (Mark Helias) – 6:38
4. "Martin's Stew" (Barry Altschul) – 16:17

== Personnel ==
- Barry Altschul – drums, cymbals, bells, gong, quica, waterphone, gongs, assorted percussion
- Ray Anderson – trombone, kalimba, Brasilian whistles
- Mark Helias – double bass
