= Ursula (album) =

Studio album by Mal Waldron
- Released: 1969
- Recorded: June 12, 1969
- Genre: Jazz
- Length: 39:50
- Label: Musica

Mal Waldron chronology
Sweet Love, Bitter (1967)	Ursula (1969)	Set Me Free (1969)

Ursula is an album by American jazz pianist Mal Waldron recorded in 1969 and released on the French Musica label.

== Track listing ==
All compositions by Mal Waldron except as indicated

1. "First Bassman" (Franco Manzecchi) — 2:13
2. "Girl on a Bicycle Waltz" — 6:43
3. "Ursula" — 4:04
4. "Blood and Guts" — 5:08
5. "Drummer's Bags" (Manzecchi) — 2:13
6. "Valse Von Den Puppen" — 4:43
7. "For Mimi" (Manzecchi) — 7:33
8. "Les Parents Terribles" — 7:13

- Recorded in Paris, France, on June 12, 1969.

== Personnel ==
- Mal Waldron — piano
- Patrice Caratini — bass
- Franco Manzecchi — drums
