= You Can't Name Your Own Tune =

Studio album by Barry Altschul
- Released: 1977
- Recorded: February 8–9, 1977
- Studio: Rosebud Studio, New York City
- Genre: Free jazz
- Length: 32:56
- Label: Muse; MR 5124
- Producer: Barry Altschul, Michael Cuscuna

Barry Altschul chronology
Virtuosi (1976)	You Can't Name Your Own Tune (1977)	Another Time/Another Place (1978)

You Can't Name Your Own Tune is an album by drummer Barry Altschul. His first release as a leader, it was recorded on February 8 and 9, 1977, at Rosebud Studio in New York City, and was issued later that year by Muse Records. On the album, Altschul is joined by saxophonist and flutist Sam Rivers, trombonist George Lewis, pianist Muhal Richard Abrams, and double bassist and cellist Dave Holland.

== Reception ==
Professional ratings
Review scores
Source	Rating
AllMusic	4.5/5 stars
MusicHound Jazz	4.5/5 stars
The Rolling Stone Jazz Record Guide	4/5 stars
The Virgin Encyclopedia of Jazz	4/5 stars

In a review for AllMusic, Scott Yanow wrote: "the highlights of this excellent album are the... selections that feature interplay between Sam Rivers... and trombonist George Lewis. Lewis in particular has rarely been heard in this type of relatively straightforward (if still adventurous) setting and really excels."

Steve Holtje, co-editor of MusicHound Jazz, stated: "this record shows how Altschul's best music combines characteristics from across jazz history while sounding thoroughly modern, and his writing and the players' solos are both at a very high level here. Abrams plays some of the best piano of his distinguished career, in fact."

Pianist and composer Ethan Iverson called the album "an incredibly listenable session of the finest exponents of this rather hectic style," and commented: "This is a one-off quintet, but everyone brings their A-game. In some ways it could pair with the early Tony Williams quintet session Spring, also with Sam Rivers. In both cases the drummer decides which directions an 'out' date should take, with notably stylish results."

== Track listing ==
1. "You Can't Name Your Own Tune" (Barry Altschul) – 7:52
2. "For Those Who Care" (Barry Altschul) – 4:53
3. "Natal Chart" (Barry Altschul) – 3:42
4. "Cmbeh" (Muhal Richard Abrams) – 6:13
5. "Hey Toots!" (Barry Altschul) – 5:07
6. "King Korn" (Carla Bley) – 4:40

== Personnel ==
- Barry Altschul – drums, percussion, gong, waterphone
- Sam Rivers – tenor saxophone, soprano saxophone, flute
- George Lewis – trombone
- Muhal Richard Abrams – piano
- Dave Holland – double bass, cello
