= Quintet (Basel) 1977 =

Live album by Anthony Braxton
- Released: 2000
- Recorded: June 2, 1977
- Venue: Basel, Switzerland
- Genre: Avant-garde jazz
- Length: 73:35
- Label: hatOLOGY 545
- Producer: Werner X. Uehlinger

Anthony Braxton chronology
Duets (1976)	Quintet (Basel) 1977 (2000)	For Trio (1977)

Quintet (Basel) 1977 is an album by the American composer and saxophonist Anthony Braxton, recorded in Switzerland in 1977 but not released on the hatOLOGY label until 2000.

== Reception ==
Professional ratings
Review scores
Source	Rating
Allmusic	4.5/5 stars

The Allmusic review by Steve Loewy awarded the album 4½ stars stating, "This super quintet meets expectations, and the historically important set should achieve some sort of critical, if not cult, status." On All About Jazz, Glenn Astarita noted, "Overall, these amazingly fresh and novel performances serve as a testament to a musician who, over the last three decades, has almost single-handedly altered the course of modern jazz and composition. Highly recommended!" In JazzTimes Ron Wynn wrote "Trombonist George Lewis' floating, often humorous recants to Braxton's leaps and darts on alto sax, sopranino and clarinet, as well as Muhal Richard Abrams' masterful accompaniment and measured yet bluesy playing, make the four lengthy numbers engrossing. The highlight is the almost 27-minute "Composition 69 N/G," which gets bolstered by edgy bass work from Mark Helias and reliable percussive tapestry provided by Charles "Bobo" Shaw. Shaw's spirited drumming brings some funk and fire to the date, while Abrams imbues it with dignity and Lewis gives it spunk".

== Track listing ==
All compositions by Anthony Braxton.

1. "Composition 69 J" - 16:25
2. "Composition 69 N/G" - 26:02
3. "Composition 69 M" - 12:52
4. "Composition 40 B" - 18:16
- Recorded at Safranzunft in Basel, Switzerland, on June 2, 1977

== Personnel ==
- Anthony Braxton - sopranino saxophone, clarinet, alto saxophone
- George Lewis - trombone
- Muhal Richard Abrams - piano
- Mark Helias - double bass
- Charles "Bobo" Shaw - drums
