= That's Nice =

Studio album by Barry Altschul Quartet / Quintet
- Released: 1986
- Recorded: November 25–26, 1985
- Studio: Barigozzi Studio, Milan, Italy
- Genre: Jazz
- Length: 44:35
- Label: Soul Note; SN 1115
- Producer: Giovanni Bonandrini

Barry Altschul chronology
Irina (1983)	That's Nice (1986)	The 3dom Factor (2013)

That's Nice is an album by the Barry Altschul Quartet / Quintet, led by drummer Altschul, and featuring saxophonist Sean Bergin, trombonist Glenn Ferris, double bassist Andy McKee, and, on two tracks, pianist Mike Melillo. It was recorded on November 25–26, 1985, at Barigozzi Studio in Milan, Italy, and was released on vinyl in 1986 by Soul Note.

== Reception ==
Professional ratings
Review scores
Source	Rating
AllMusic	3.5/5 stars
MusicHound Jazz	2/5 stars
The Penguin Guide to Jazz	3.5/4 stars
The Rolling Stone Jazz & Blues Album Guide	3.5/5 stars
Tom Hull – on the Web	B+
The Virgin Encyclopedia of Jazz	4/5 stars

In a review for AllMusic, Scott Yanow noted that Altschul "gets to show off his versatility and talents" on the album, and wrote: "In general, the music has many free moments, yet is not afraid to swing or to include melodies. A stimulating set."

The authors of The Penguin Guide to Jazz Recordings described the album as "not a memorable set," and commented: "The quartet tracks with just horns are more arrestingly original than the two with pianist Melillo, who shifts the direction back towards the mainstream. Bergin has some incendiary moments and Ferris and McKee bring in some interesting compositional material."

A writer for Coda stated that the album "utilizes some of the innovations of the past to create new music," and praised the contributions of trombonist Ferris, noting that he "has finally found the perfect platform for his talents and hopefully will be with Altschul for a long time." He remarked: "I eagerly look forward to the Barry Altschul Quartet's next album. There is great potential in this unit."

Steve Holtje of MusicHound Jazz wrote: "The problem with That's Nice... is summed up by its bland title, which matches the bland music. Perhaps it was important to Altschul to demonstrate his mainstream abilities with a group of non-stars... but the enervated results sound shallow."

== Track listing ==
1. "Ahfra Love" (Glenn Ferris) – 7:19
2. "Blues Interrogation" (Andy McKee) – 7:20
3. "Satarumbarengue" (Barry Altschul) – 7:43
4. "That's Nice" (Barry Altschul) – 9:47
5. "For 'Papa' Jo, 'Klook' And 'Philly' Too" (Barry Altschul) – 12:11

== Personnel ==
- Barry Altschul – drums
- Sean Bergin – alto saxophone, tenor xaxophone
- Glenn Ferris – trombone
- Mike Melillo – piano (tracks 3 and 4)
- Andy McKee – double bass
