= Denis Levaillant =

French composer, pianist and writer

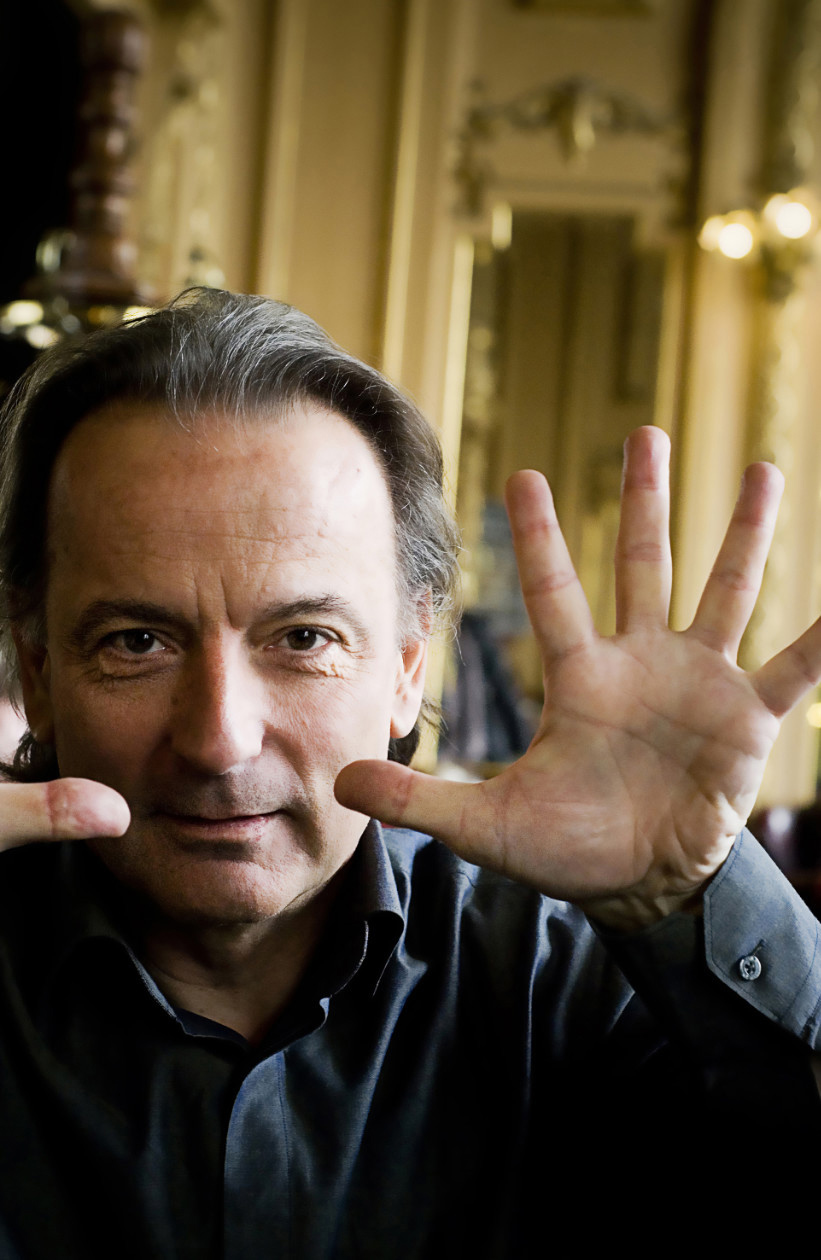
- Denis Levaillant in 2013

Background information
- Born: 3 August 1952 (age 74); Paris, France
- Genres: Classical; jazz; acoustic
- Occupations: Pianist; composer; arranger; writer
- Instrument: Piano
- Years active: 1973–present
- Website: www.denislevaillant.net

Denis Levaillant (born 3 August 1952) is a French composer, pianist and writer based in Paris, France. He has orchestrated more than twenty musical shows including La Petite Danseuse de Degas and composed more than 120 musical works worldwide. Levaillant has been recognized for his improvisation and orchestration work and his ability to synthesize in his art several antagonistic genres such as composition/improvisation, classical/jazz, classical/popular and acoustic/electro.

== Early life ==
Levaillant was born in Paris to Raymonde and Jean Levaillant. He is the grandson of the French poet and critic, Maurice Levaillant. He started playing piano at an early age of five. He began harmony, counterpoint and composition training at the age of twelve, under French music professor, Magdeleine Mangin in 1964, in Nancy, France.

Levaillant first spent his teenage years in Nancy, then in Paris, where he studied composition and philosophy. In 1974, he received his master's degree in philosophy from the University of Paris 1 Pantheon-Sorbonne. Later, he attended Conservatoire National Supérieur de Musique et de Danse de Paris, where he received training in music composition, orchestration and analysis under Gérard Grisey, Marius Constant and Claude Ballif.

== Career ==
Levaillant started his professional career in the early 1970s. In 1973, he collaborated with Radio France and composed Circus Virus, a musical piece for France Culture. His first music had inspirations from his adolescence heroes, such as Karlheinz Stockhausen, Jimi Hendrix and Ornette Coleman. Through the 1970s and 1980s, Levaillant released seven more albums and published a book on music improvisation and compositions, L'improvisation musicale, published by Éditions Lattès in 1980. He collaborated with Alain Françon and Alain Guesnier and composed music for multiple musical shows and feature films during these years. He collaborated with and composed music for various French and international jazz musicians such as Jean-Jacques Avenel, Didier Levallet, Mino Cinélu, Jean-Louis Chautemps, Pierre Favre, Bernard Lubat, Tony Coe, Kenny Wheeler, Jean-François Jenny-Clark, Michel Portal, Barry Altschul and Barre Phillips.

In 1980, at the age of 26, Levaillant began composing ballet music for the Paris Opera. In 1981, he founded Bleu 17, a music institution that focused on producing musical shows.

From 1983 to 2006, Levaillant created nearly 20 musical shows and operas that were performed around Europe. He collaborated with Barry Altschul and Barre Phillips to compose Les Passagers du delta in 1986. Levaillant created the opera O.P.A Mia in collaboration with Enki Bilal during the Festival d'Avignon in 1990. He collaborated with Dominique Bagouet, Stéphanie Aubin, Brigitte Lefèvre, Dominique Petit and Caroline Marcadé for more than 30 live shows.

In the early 1980s, Levaillant participated in Institut national de l'audiovisuel and Groupe de Recherches Musicales's digital sound processing initiative, which inspired him to compose Piano Transit, a piano composition with electronic fusion, in 1983. In 1988, Levaillant was awarded with Prix Italia by RAI for his work, in the category Speakers.

In 1995, Levaillant was commissioned by Ensemble InterContemporain and Musée du Louvre for creating music for Fritz Lang's last silent film, Woman in the Moon. Later that year, he co-founded the Cabinet de Musique Généraliste (CMG) with Frédéric Leibovitz, an initiative aimed towards promoting contemporary music in the audiovisual world. Over the years, prominent composers and musicians like Philippe Hersant, Allain Gaussin, Bruno Letort, L'Orchestre de contrebasses, Gilles Racot, Christian Zanési, Michel Redolfi, Cesarius Alvim, Calin Ioachimescu and Doina Rotaru became part of the Cabinet de Musique Généraliste.

In the late 1990s, Levaillant performed live at various festivals and composed several works such as Echo de Narcisse, Le Clair, l'Obscur pour quatuor à cordes, Paysages de Conte and Tombeau de Gesualdo. In 2004, Lavaillant composed music for Enki Bilal's science fiction film, Immortal.

In 2002, Levaillant composed the ballet La Petite danseuse de Degas produced by the Paris Opera. It was premiered in 2003 at Opéra-Garnier and was performed again in 2005 and 2010. France 2 filmed the performance and Arthaus released the DVD. In 2005, l'Orchestre philharmonique de Radio France commissioned him to compose music for the children's book L'Opéra de la lune by Jacques Prévert. In 2014, Levaillant wrote Panchamama Symphony, a composition for concert bands. The Andean music of Bolivia inspired Panchamama Symphony.

In 2014, 15 universities in the United States invited Levaillant for the master classes and concerts.

== Personal life ==
Apart from being a musician, Levaillant is a mountaineer. He has climbed in Oisans alongside Jean-Michel Cambon and Bernard Francou. Levaillant has also climbed new challenging routes in Bolivia with the French climber, Alain Mesili.

Levaillant was married in 1972, to Christine Rigaud. The couple has two children, Julie and Fabien, and three grandchildren, Marilou, Elise and Andréa.

== Awards and recognition ==
- 1983 : Laureate of the Villa Médicis (New York)
- 1987 : Prix Tendance
- 1988 : Prix Italia, in the category Speakers

== Discography ==
=== Albums and singles ===
- 1973 : Son dernier Tango
- 1975 : Attention l'armée,
- 1978 : Instable,
- 1979 : Trans-Musiques,
- 1983 : Direct
- 1984 : Six séquences pour Alfred Hitchcock
- 1984 : Barium Circus
- 1986 : Passages
- 1990 : Musiques pour le théâtre
- 1991 : Musiques pour le piano
- 1991 : Musiques pour la danse
- 1992 : Musiques pour les voix
- 1993 : NEXT
- 1995 : Génériques potentiels
- 1996 : Théâtres
- 1997 : Shorts !
- 1998 : L'Etrange
- 1999 : Out The/Ailleurs
- 2000 : Direct
- 2001 : Figures
- 2002 : Dark Textures & Drones
- 2003 : Documentary line
- 2006 : Paysages avec piano
- 2007 : Drone Music
- 2008 : Modern Acoustic Sketches
- 2009 : Music Is The Film
- 2012 : The Fear Factory
- 2014 : Cinematic Edge Vol.1
- 2015 : City organix
- 2018 : HAYDN Early and late Sonatas
- 2019 : Aurora Borealis
- 2019 : Cinematic Orchestral Music: Volume 1
- 2019 : Cinematic Orchestral Music: Volume 2
- 2020 : Electro Space Piano,
- Reference: Denis Levaillant – Discographie : CDs / LPs, denislevaillant.net

=== Compositions for films ===
- 1978 : La petite Annonce
- 1979 : 74 rue de Boissy
- 1981 : Adieu Pyrénées
- 1984 : Elektra
- 1985 : Trombone en coulisses
- 1986 : Mot à mot
- 1987 : L'eau en formes
- 1988 : Mother Goose
- 1989 : Vidéopérette,
- 1993 : Next
- 1995 : La Femme sur la Lune
- 2003 : Dark
- 2006 : Paysages avec piano
- 2006 : Drones
- 2008 : Blindspot
- 2012 : The Fear Factory
- 2015 : City Organix
- Reference: Denis Levaillant – Music for films, denislevaillant.net

== Bibliography ==
- 1974 : Musique, Idéologie, Politique, mémoire de maîtrise de Philosophie
- 1978 : Interdit d'antenne
- 1980 : L'improvisation musicale
- 1983/1984 : Eloge de l'outil
- 1986 : Le Piano
- 1990 : Un bout de tuyau avec quelques trous
- 1990 : Auteur de musique
- 1991 : Enki Bilal, un décorateur ?
- 1991 : Trois motifs pour le jazz
- 1992 : Pour une musique nouvelle
- 1994 : La Femme sur la Lune, réflexion sur la relation musique et image
- 2006 : O.P.A. MIA, Livre-DVD Illustré, broché,
- 2006 : En lisant, en jouant, en écrivant (1)
- 2008 : L'Opéra de la Lune
- 2008 : Cent ans de bonheur
- 2008 : A quoi l'art pense-t-il ?
- 2008 : En lisant, en jouant, en écrivant
- 2010 : La Petite danseuse de Degas (on Degas' Little Dancer of Fourteen Years)
- 2011 : Les Musiciens de Brême
- 2012 : Eloge du musical
- 2012 : Paysages de conte
- 2013 : Les Passagers du delta
- 2014 : Manhattan Rhapsody
- 2015 : L'Art de l'improvisation au piano
- 2017 : O.P.A. MIA (My Tender Bid)
- Reference: Denis Levaillant – Bibliography – Book CDs, denislevaillant.net

== Operas and shows ==
- 1974 : L'oreille bée
- 1976 : Le Baigneur
- 1978 : Embellie fixe
- 1979 : Le jardin du sanglier
- 1980 : Piano Check-up, La Chevauchée
- 1981 : Portrait de l'artiste
- 1981 : Grand Corridor
- 1982 : Dérive
- 1982 : D.D.Blue Gold Digger,
- 1983 : Inside
- 1983 : Aranzaquil
- 1983 : Deux pièces à louer, Piano check-up & Le Baigneur
- 1983 : Les Pas Perdus
- 1984 : The Blue Street
- 1984 : Rythm'n'shoes
- 1986': Eaux-fortes
- 1986 : Le Dernier Pèlerinage
- 1986 : Les Passagers du delta
- 1987 : Les heures défaites
- 1987 : Solo piano solo
- 1989 : O.P.A MIA
- 1989 : Passage de l'heure bleue
- 1992 : Lettres de Georgie, Ballet
- 1993 : Piano Circus
- 1994 : Poètes et burlesques, Spectacle musical, pièces pour piano accompagnant un programme de films Pathé des années 1910.
- 1995 : Passions, Les Pierres noires, Sunny Cash passion, Compassion, Madrigaux de guerre & Tombeau de Gesualdo.
- 1995 : La Femme sur la Lune
- 1998/1999 : Techno Space Piano
- 1999/2000 : Eloge de la radio
- 2003 : La Petite danseuse
- 2005/2006 : Un petit rien-du-tout
- 2009/2010 : Les Musiciens de Brême
- Reference: Denis Levaillant – Operas and shows, denislevaillant.net
