= Ernie Krivda =

American jazz saxophonist (born 1945)

- Born: Krvda Ernö; February 6, 1945 (age 81); Cleveland, Ohio, United States
- Genres: Jazz
- Occupation: Saxophonist
- Instruments: Tenor saxophone, soprano saxophone, flute
- Years active: 1963–present
- Labels: Inner City Records, Cadence, Koch International, C.I.M.P. Records
- Formerly of: Jimmy Dorsey Orchestra, Eddie Baccus, Bill DeArango, The Fat Tuesday Big Band

Ernie Krivda (born February 6, 1945, in Cleveland, Ohio as Krvda Ernö) is a jazz saxophonist, flutist, bandleader, and educator.

Ernie Krivda, who is of Hungarian and Sicilian heritage, began his professional career in 1963 with the Jimmy Dorsey Orchestra. During the 1960s he played in bands of two Cleveland legends, organist Eddie Baccus and guitarist Bill DeArango. Later, in the early 1970s, he became the leader of the house band of the Smiling Dog Saloon. There he shared the stage with Chick Corea, Elvin Jones, Herbie Hancock and many others. Alto saxophonist Cannonball Adderley heard Krivda and recommended him to Quincy Jones. After touring and recording with Jones, Krivda moved to New York and signed a contract with Inner City Records. A series of albums received great critical acclaim.

Krivda has since recorded numerous additional albums, eighteen in all, and has appeared at such prestigious venues as The Kool Jazz Festival, The North Sea Jazz Festival and at Carnegie Hall. In the 1990s, Krivda made recordings for Cadence, Koch International and C.I.M.P. Records. It was during this time that he founded The Fat Tuesday Big Band in Northeast Ohio. He continued to tour including concerts in Los Angeles, Chicago and New York City.

He remains active in education as artistic director of The Cuyahoga Community College Jazz Studies Program in Cleveland, Ohio and touring clinician for The Yamaha Instrument Company. Among his gigs was a tribute to Stan Getz at Cleveland's Severance Hall, home of The Cleveland Orchestra at which Krivda played Eddie Sauter's FOCUS. It was the first performance of this piece since Stan Getz played it in 1961.

Krivda has been the recipient of many Cleveland awards including the Free Times Readers Poll for Best Jazz Act, Best Swing Big Band and Best Horn Player. He has also won The Editors Choice of ClevelandSearch.com, as The city's Best Instrumentalist. He continues to be the subject of articles in national publications, such as Down Beat and Jazz Times Magazine, and his work is documented in The Encyclopedia of Jazz and many Jazz Record Guides.

== Discography ==
As a leader:

- 1977 - Ernie Krivda & Friends: Satanic (Inner City Records)
- 1978 - The Alchemist (Inner City Records)
- 1980 - Ernie Krivda Quartet: The Glory Strut (Inner City Records)
- 1983 - Ernie Krivda Quartet: Live at Peabody's (North Coast Jazz Records)
- 1984 - Ernie Krivda Quartet: Live at Rusty's (North Coast Jazz Records)
- 1985 - Ernie Krivda / Kenny Davis Quintet: The Fireside Sessions (North Coast Jazz Records)
- 1986 - Ernie Krivda Quartet: Tough Tenor Red Hot (Cadence Jazz Records)
- 1987 - Ernie Krivda Quartet: Well You Needn't (Cadence Jazz Records)
- 1991 - Ernie Krivda Jazz Quartet: Ernie Krivda Jazz (Cadence Jazz Records)
- 1996 - Ernie Krivda & Bill Dobbins: The Art of the Ballad (Koch Jazz)
- 1997 - Ernie Krivda & Dan Wall: Golden Moments (Koch Jazz)
- 1997 - Ernie Krivda Trio: Sarah's Theme (CIMP)
- 1998 - Ernie Krivda & the Fat Tuesday Big Band: Perdido (Koch Jazz)
- 1999 - Ernie Krivda & the Fat Tuesday Big Band: The Band That Swings (Koch Jazz)
- 2003 - Ernie Krivda Jazz Sextet: The Music of Ernie Krivda (Cadence Jazz Records)
- 2004 - Focus on Stan Getz (Cadence Jazz Records)
- 2005 - Ernie Krivda & the Fat Tuesday Big Band: Body & Soul (Americatone Records)
- 2009 - November Man (CIMP)

As a sideman:

- 1970 - Bill Dobbins Orchestra: Textures (Advent Records)
- 1976 - Quincy Jones Orchestra: Mellow Madness (Inner City Records)
- 1983 - Bill Dobbins Quartet: Live at Peabody's (North Coast Jazz Records)
- 1988 - Cliff Habian: Tonal Paintings (Milestone)
- 1989 - Cadence Jazz All-Stars: Lee's Keys Please (Timeless Records)
- 1996 - Pete Selvaggio: Galleria (Koch Jazz)
