= Five Pieces 1975 =

Studio album by Anthony Braxton
- Released: 1975
- Recorded: July 1–2, 1975
- Studio: Generation Sound, New York City
- Genre: Jazz
- Length: 40:24
- Label: Arista AB 4064
- Producer: Michael Cuscuna

Anthony Braxton chronology
New York, Fall 1974 (1974)	Five Pieces 1975 (1975)	Creative Orchestra Music 1976 (1976)

Five Pieces 1975 is an album by American jazz saxophonist Anthony Braxton recorded in 1975 and released on the Arista label. The album was subsequently included on The Complete Arista Recordings of Anthony Braxton released by Mosaic Records in 2008.

== Reception ==
The Allmusic review by Scott Yanow awarded the album 4½ stars stating "The tightness of his very alert and versatile group and the strength of the compositions make this one of Anthony Braxton's most rewarding records of the mid-1970s".

Professional ratings
Review scores
Source	Rating
Allmusic	4.5/5 stars
The Rolling Stone Jazz Record Guide	4/5 stars

== Track listing ==
All compositions by Anthony Braxton except where noted.

1. "You Stepped Out of a Dream" (Nacio Herb Brown, Gus Kahn) - 7:09
2. (Composition 23H) - 4:35
3. (Composition 23G) - 8:05
4. (Composition 23E) - 17:17
5. (Composition 40M) - 3:23
- Recorded at Generation Sound Studios in New York on July 1 (track 1) & July 2 (tracks 2–5), 1975

== Personnel ==
- Anthony Braxton - sopranino saxophone, alto saxophone, clarinet, contrabass clarinet, flute, alto flute
- Kenny Wheeler - trumpet, flugelhorn
- Dave Holland - bass
- Barry Altschul - drums
