= Sweet Love, Bitter (film) =

- Directed by: Herbert Danska
- Written by: Herbert Danska; Lewis Jacobs
- Based on: Night Song (novel) by John Alfred Williams
- Produced by: Gerald Kleppel; Lewis Jacobs
- Starring: Dick Gregory; Robert Hooks; Don Murray; Diane Varsi
- Cinematography: Victor Solow
- Edited by: Gerald Kleppel
- Music by: Mal Waldron
- Distributed by: Film 2 Associates
- Release date: January 30, 1967
- Running time: 92 minutes
- Country: United States
- Language: English

Sweet Love, Bitter is a 1967 film based on the novel Night Song by John Alfred Williams. The story is inspired by the life of jazz musician Charlie Parker. American jazz pianist Mal Waldron recorded a soundtrack album for the film.

== Plot ==
The film opens with Richie "Eagle" Stokes (Dick Gregory) found dead in his bed before showing the journey of how he got there. He is a jazz musician, jaded by how society treats him and seeks to numb himself with drugs, liquor and women. He crosses paths with David Hillary (Don Murray), a white male and former professor, when they both find themselves at a pawn shop. Hillary is distraught by the loss of his wife in a car accident, convinced that he is the cause of her death. They bond over drinks only to be found by Keel Robinson (Robert Hooks), Stokes' friend and former reverend. Robinson offers to provide Hillary with a room in exchange for working at the coffee shop he owns.

Robinson and Hillary find Stokes at Candy's (Jeri Archer) house, over-dosed but not yet dead. From here the film further explores the relationship between Robinson and his girlfriend Della (Diane Varsi), where they exhibit doubts and fears of interracial discrimination.

While waiting for Hillary to finish a job interview for a professor position, Stokes is accosted by a policeman. Hillary had seen the altercation from afar but had done nothing to help him. When Stokes find out, he vents and seeks the company of Candy. Stokes passes away that night from a heroin overdose but Robinson says that his cause of death was, "resisting reality." Hillary and Robinson part their ways.

== Cast ==
- Dick Gregory as Richie "Eagle" Stokes
- Robert Hooks as Keel Robinson
- Don Murray as David Hillary
- Diane Varsi as Della
- Jeri Archer as Candy
- Osborne Smith
- George Wilshire
- Bruce Glover
- Leonard Parker
- John Randolph
- Woody King Jr.
- Florette Carter
- Carla Pinza
- Barbara Davis as Girl In Bar

== Production ==
Dick Gregory stated in his memoir that he had accepted the role to take his mind off of the passing of Malcolm X. Since the film was Gregory's first acting role, Woodie King Jr. was hired as his coach. Gregory had temporarily left the production to participate in the march on Selma.

Production Team

- Assistant Director: Ben Berk
- Cameraman: Morris Kellman
- Assistant Cameraman: Howard Neef
- Film Editor: Reva Schlesinger
- Sound Editor: Jack Fitzstephens
- Assistant Editor: Macel Wilson
- Sound Engineer: Jack Gofsky
- Sound Mixer: Albert Gramaglia
- Director's Assistant: Mike Kitei
- Sets: Kees Van Dyke
- Script Girl: Dolores Friedman
- Make-Up: Andrew McKay
- Still Photographer: Arnold Eagle
- Casting: Sam Chew Jr.
- Dick Gregory's Coach: Woodie King Jr,
- Additional Dialogue: Martin Kroll
- Hair-styling: Herbert's
- Clothes: Villager
- Recorded at: Recording Studios Inc.
- Film Processing: Pathe Laboratories
- Production Studio: Film Three Productions Inc.

== Reception ==
The film debuted at Carnegie Hall on January 30, 1967. Mayor John Lindsay was in attendance because Dick Gregory had endorsed him in 1965.

The film was re-cut and shown at art houses under the title of Black Love--White Love as well as It Won't Rub Off, Baby!
