= Sweet Love, Bitter (album) =

Soundtrack album by Mal Waldron
- Released: 1967
- Recorded: March 23, 1967
- Genre: Jazz
- Length: 31:28
- Label: Impulse!

Mal Waldron chronology
The Quest (1961)	Sweet Love, Bitter (1967)	Ursula (1969)

Sweet Love, Bitter is a soundtrack album by American jazz pianist Mal Waldron, recorded in 1967 for the film of the same name and released on the Impulse! label. The movie was a fictitious retelling of Charlie Parker's last years and a portrait of the jazz scene in 1960s New York.

== Reception ==
The AllMusic review by Ken Dryden stated that "the music by Waldron is brilliant... Known for his lyrical yet often dark compositions, Waldron's work on this session will surprise some of his biggest fans".

Professional ratings
Review scores
Source	Rating
AllMusic	4/5 stars
DownBeat	3/5 stars

== Track listing ==
All compositions by Mal Waldron

1. "Loser's Lament (Theme From "Sweet Love, Bitter")" — 5:11
2. "Della" — 2:36
3. "Hillary" — 2:23
4. "Espresso Time" — 2:11
5. "Keel" — 2:40
6. "Smokin'" — 2:06
7. "Della's Dream" — 2:23
8. "The Search" — 1:21
9. "Candy's Ride" — 1:18
10. ""Bread"" — 1:47
11. "Eagle Flips Out" — 2:14
12. "Brindle's Place" — 3:07
13. "Sleep Baby Sleep — 2:11

- Recorded in New York City on March 23, 1967.

== Personnel ==
- Mal Waldron — piano
- Dave Burns — trumpet
- George Coleman — tenor saxophone, alto saxophone
- Charles Davis — baritone saxophone
- Richard Davis (tracks 1 & 4) George Duvivier (tracks 2, 3 & 5–13) — bass
- Al Dreares — drums
