= Jean Catoire =

French composer

- Born: 1 April 1923; Paris, France
- Origin: France
- Died: November 9, 2006 (aged 83)
- Occupation: Composer

Jean Catoire (1 April 1923 – 9 November 2005) was a French composer of contemporary classical music.

He studied with Olivier Messiaen and developed a personal style that was spiritual in outlook; in this regard his output is comparable to that of the Estonian composer Arvo Pärt. He was prolific, producing 604 opus numbers by 1996. The first recording of his music was released in 1999.

Pianist Nicolas Horvath is one of the leading interpreters of Catoire's music.
