= Barry Altschul =

American drummer

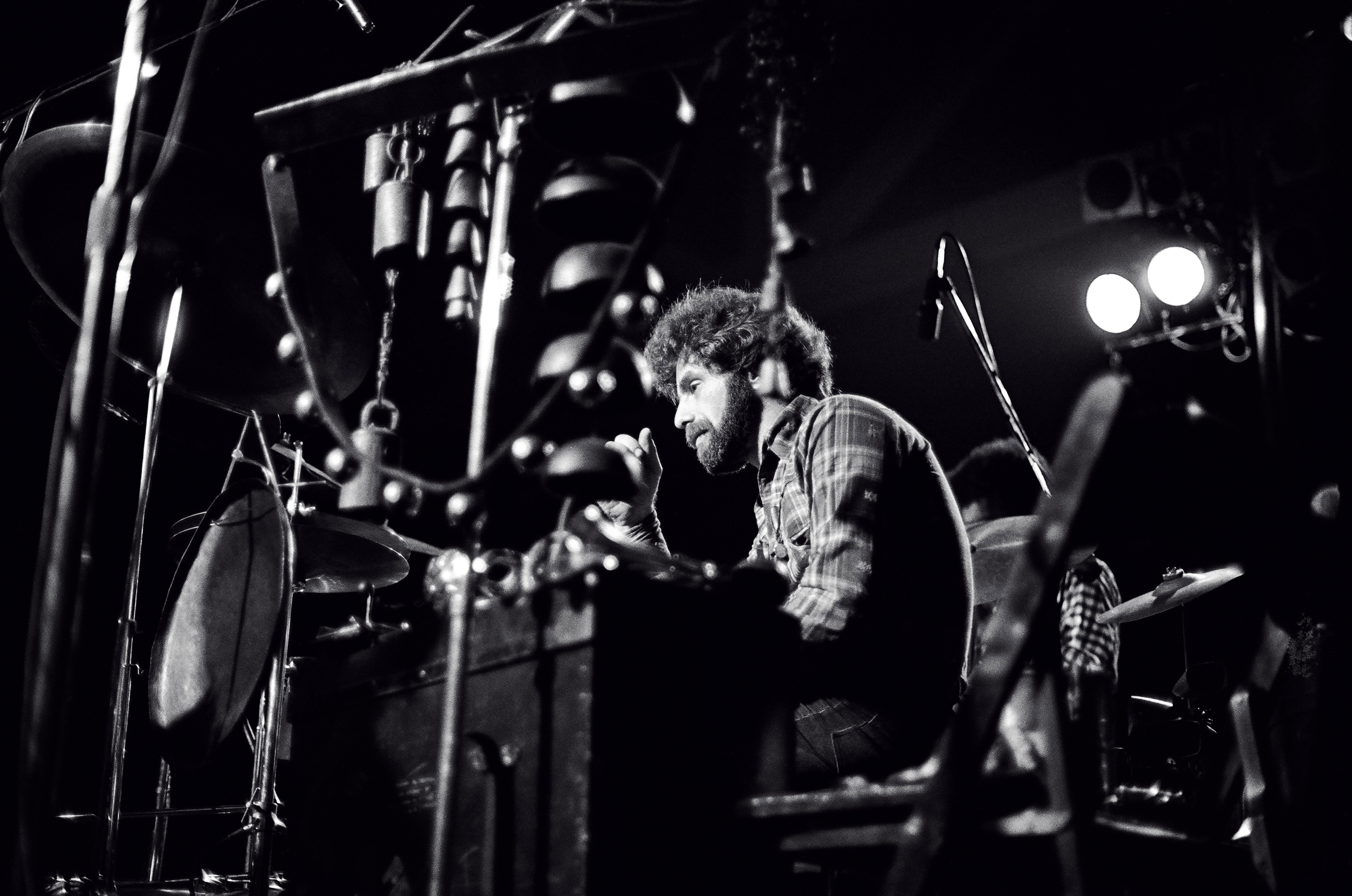
- 1976

Background information
- Born: January 6, 1943 (age 83); New York City, U.S.
- Genres: Avant-garde jazz
- Occupation: Musician
- Instrument: Drums
- Years active: 1960s–present

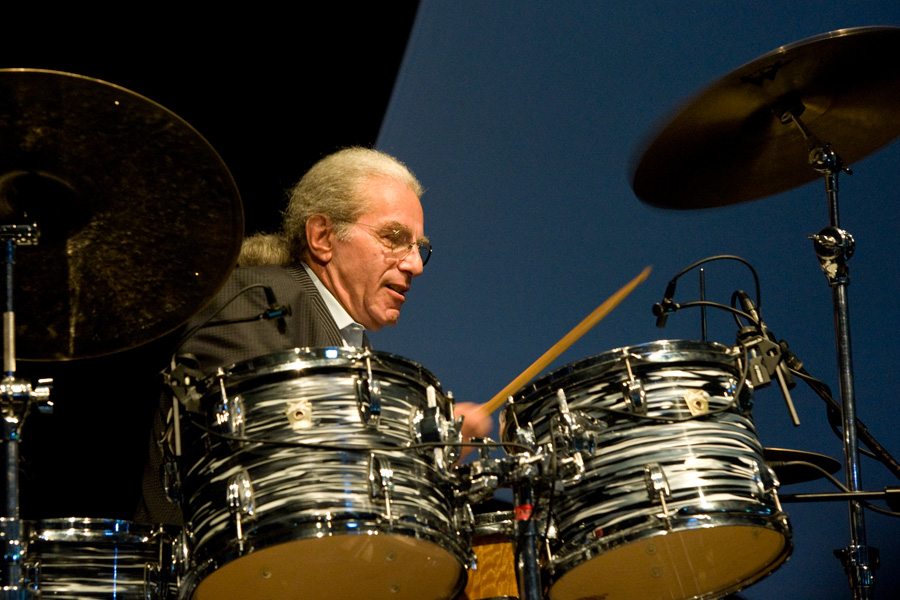
Barry Altschul, moers festival 2011

Barry Altschul (born January 6, 1943, in New York City) is an American free jazz and hard bop drummer, who first came to notice in the late 1960s for performing with pianists Paul Bley and Chick Corea.

== Biography ==
Altschul is of Russian Jewish heritage, the son of a laborer who did construction work and drove a taxi. Having initially taught himself to play drums, Altschul studied with Charlie Persip during the 1960s. In the latter part of the decade, he performed with Paul Bley. In 1969 he joined with Chick Corea, Dave Holland and Anthony Braxton to form the group Circle. At the time, he made use of a high-pitched Gretsch kit with add-on drums and percussion instruments.

In the 1970s, Altschul worked extensively with Anthony Braxton's quartet featuring Kenny Wheeler, Dave Holland, and George E. Lewis. Braxton, signed to Arista Records, was able to secure a large enough budget to tour with a collection of dozens of percussion instruments, strings and winds. In addition to his participation in ensembles featuring avant-garde musicians, Altschul performed with Lee Konitz, Art Pepper and other "straight ahead" jazz performers.

Altschul also made albums as a leader, but after the mid-1980s he was rarely seen in concert or on record, spending much of his time in Europe. Since the 2000s, he has become more visible, with five co-leader appearances with the FAB trio (with Billy Bang and Joe Fonda), the Jon Irabagon Trio recording Foxy and the bassist Adam Lane. Altschul has played or recorded with many musicians, including Roswell Rudd, Dave Liebman, Barre Phillips, Denis Levaillant, Andrew Hill, Sonny Criss, Hampton Hawes, and Lee Konitz. In 2012, Altschul began performing and recording with his new trio, the 3dom Factor, featuring saxophonist Jon Irabagon and double bassist Joe Fonda. 2019 saw the first release by the OGJB Quartet, a collective group featuring saxophonist Oliver Lake, cornetist Graham Haynes, Joe Fonda, and Altschul.

== Discography ==
=== As leader ===
- 1977: You Can't Name Your Own Tune (32 Jazz, 1977)
- 1978: Another Time/Another Place (Muse, 1978)
- 1979: For Stu (Soul Note, 1981)
- 1979: Somewhere Else (Moers Music, 1979) – live
- 1980: Brahma (Sackville, 1980)
- 1983: Irina (Soul Note, 1983)
- 1985: That's Nice (Soul Note, 1986)

With the 3dom Factor (Altschul, Jon Irabagon, and Joe Fonda)

- 2013: The 3dom Factor (TUM)
- 2015: Tales of the Unforeseen (TUM)
- 2017: Live in Kraków (Not Two)
- 2021: Long Tall Sunshine (Not Two)

=== As co-leader ===
- 1967: Virtuosi with Paul Bley and Gary Peacock (Improvising Artists, 1976)
- 1978: Stop Time with David Izenzon and Perry Robinson (NoBusiness, 2023)
- 1979: Be-Bop? with Pepper Adams (Musica, 1979)
- 2014?: BBK with Barry Wedgle and Kim Stone (Exit, 2014)

=== As a member ===
The FAB Trio
With Joe Fonda, Billy Bang

- Transforming the Space (CIMP, 2003)
- Live at Iron Works (Konnex, 2005)
- A Night in Paris (Marge, 2008)
- Live in Amsterdam (Porter, 2009)
- History of Jazz in Reverse (TUM, 2011)

The OGJB Quartet
With Oliver Lake, Graham Haynes, Joe Fonda

- Bamako (TUM, 2019)
- Ode to O (TUM, 2022)

=== As sideman ===
With Paul Bley

- Touching (Debut, 1965)
- Closer (ESP-Disk, 1966)
- Ramblin' (BYG Actuel, 1967)
- Blood (Fontana, 1966)
- In Haarlem - Blood (Freedom, 1967)
- Ballads (rec. 1967, ECM, 1971)
- Paul Bley & Scorpio (Milestone, 1973)
- Japan Suite (Improvising Artists, 1977)
- Hot (Soul Note, 1985)
- Live at Sweet Basil (Soul Note, 1988)
- Indian Summer (SteepleChase, 1987)
- Rejoicing (SteepleChase, 1989)

With Anthony Braxton

- The Complete Braxton (Freedom, 1973) – rec. 1971
- News from the 70s (Musica Jazz/Felmay, 1998) – rec. 1971–1976
- Town Hall 1972 (Trio, 1972)
- Quartet: Live at Moers Festival (Ring, 1976) – rec. 1974
- Five Pieces 1975 (Arista, 1975)
- Creative Orchestra Music 1976 (Arista, 1976)
- Dortmund (Quartet) 1976 (hatART, 1991) – rec. 1976
- The Montreux/Berlin Concerts (Arista, 1976) – rec. 1975–76

With Chick Corea

- The Song of Singing (Blue Note, 1971) – rec. 1970
- ARC (ECM, 1971)
- Circle 1: Live in Germany Concert (CBS/Sony Japan, 1971) – live rec. 1970
- Circle 2: Gathering (CBS/Sony Japan, 1971) – live
- Paris Concert (ECM, 1972) – rec. 1971
- Circling In (Blue Note, 1975) – rec. 1968, 1970
- Circulus (Blue Note, 1978) – rec. 1970
- The Beginning (LaserLight Digital, 1996) – rec. 1970

With Annette Peacock

- 1972 I'm the One
- 2014 I Belong to a World That's Destroying Itself [aka Revenge]

With Sam Rivers

- 1973 Hues (Impulse!)
- 1975 Sizzle (Impulse!)
- 1976 The Quest (Red)
- 1977 Paragon (Fluid)
- 1977 Zenith (NoBusiness, 2019)
- 1978 Ricochet (NoBusiness, 2020)
- 2007 Reunion: Live in New York (Pi, 2012)

With Roswell Rudd

- 1974 Flexible Flyer (Freedom)
- 2009 Trombone Tribe (Sunnyside)

With Ullmann/Swell 4

- 2004 Desert Songs and Other Landscapes (CIMP)
- 2010 News? No News! (Jazzwerskstatt)
- 2010 Live in Montreal (CIMP)
- 2022 We're Playing in Here? (NoBusiness)

With others

- 1972 Hold That Plane!, Buddy Guy
- 1972 Play the Blues, Buddy Guy/Junior Wells
- 1973 Conference of the Birds, Dave Holland (ECM)
- 1973 Icarus, Paul Winter
- 1974 Drum Ode, Dave Liebman
- 1975 Coon Bid'ness, Julius Hemphill, reissued in 1995 as Reflections
- 1975 Spiral, Andrew Hill
- 1982 Give and Take, John Lindberg (Black Saint)
- 1983 And Far Away Kenny Drew (Soul Note)
- 1983 Lido, Claudio Fasoli
- 1983 My One and Only Love, Franco D'Andrea
- 1983 No Idea of Time, Franco D'Andrea
- 1983 Sounds of Love, Tiziana Ghiglioni
- 1986 Passages, Denis Levaillant (DLM, 1986/2012)
- 1990 Brundl's Basslab, Manfred Brundl
- 1991 For All the Marbles Suite, Simon Nabatov
- 1992 Giacobazzi: Autour de la Rade, André Jaume
- 1995 Live, Brundl's Basslab
- 1997 Kinshasa-Washington D.C.-Paris, Ray Lema
- 1999 Clarinet Sessions, André Jaume
- 2000 Another Side, Ken Simon
- 2001 Skillfullness, Alan Silva
- 2002 Four Beings, Adam Lane
- 2005 Flat Fleet, Enrico Rava
- 2020 An Evening in Houston, Patty Waters
