= Jon Irabagon =

Filipino-American musician

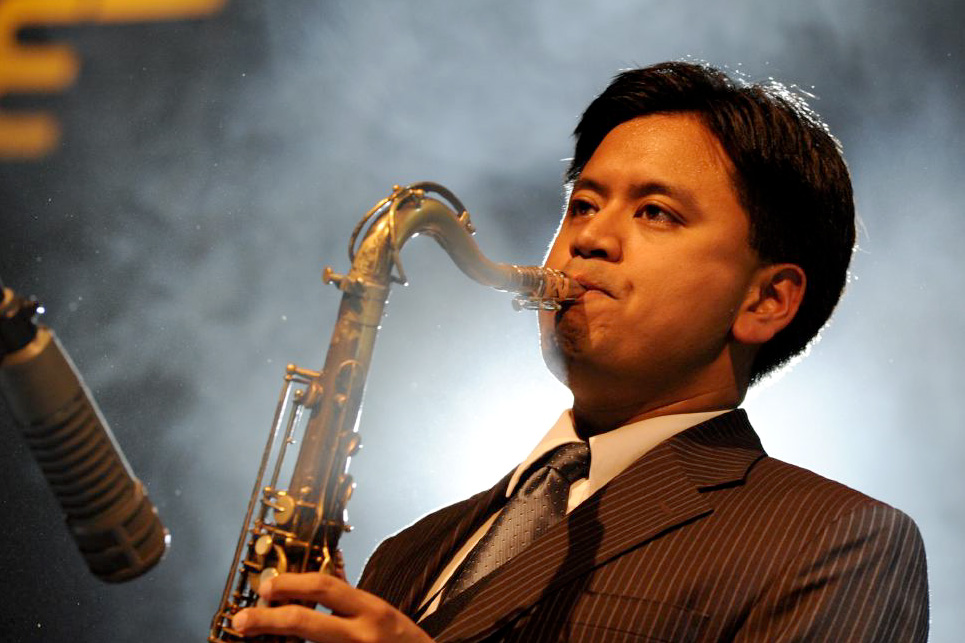
- Jon Irabagon at the Moers Festival in 2009

Background information
- Genres: avant-garde jazz, free jazz, post-bop, avant-metal, experimental music
- Occupations: composer, saxophonist
- Labels: Irabbagast, Innova, Hot Cup, Carrier, Greenleaf Music
- Website: jonirabagon.com

Jon Irabagon is a Filipino-American saxophonist, composer, and founder of Irabbagast Records.

Winner of the 2008 Thelonious Monk Jazz Competition and one of Time Out's "25 essential New York City jazz icons", Irabagon is known for the breadth of his work on a jazz continuum ranging "from postbop to free improvisation, avant country to doom metal". His "extraordinary eclecticism" has led to performances with such diverse artists as Wynton Marsalis, Lou Reed, Evan Parker, Billy Joel, the Maria Schneider Orchestra, Bertha Hope, Herbie Hancock, Conor Oberst, Christian McBride, Mike Pride, Kenny Barron, Darcy James Argue's Secret Society, Bill Laswell, Peter Evans, Tyshawn Sorey, Ingrid Laubrock, Ava Mendoza, Mick Barr, and Tom Rainey.

Irabagon's many projects as bandleader include a quartet with Luis Perdomo, Yasushi Nakamura, and Rudy Royston, as well as a trio with Mark Helias and Barry Altschul. He is also a member of the Mary Halvorson Quintet, Septet, and Octet; the Dave Douglas Quintet; Barry Altschul’s 3Dom Factor; and is a former member of Mostly Other People Do the Killing. Irabagon received a Philippine Presidential Award in 2014.

== Education and career ==
Irabagon grew up in Chicago’s northern suburbs before attending DePaul, where he completed his BM in Music Business in 2000. In 2001, Irabagon moved to New York City and enrolled in a master's degree at Manhattan School of Music; after completing his MA, he went on to study in the jazz program at Juilliard.

In 2003, Irabagon joined Peter Evans and Kevin Shea in Moppa Elliott's Mostly Other People Do the Killing, a quartet known for both technical skill and a "prankish exterior"; their first album was released on Elliott's Hot Cup Records in 2005. Irabagon went on to record eleven albums with the group, including their controversial note-for-note remake of Miles Davis's Kind of Blue.

In 2008, Innova released Irabagon's first album as leader, Jon Irabagon’s Outright!. The record's core quintet includes trumpeter Russ Johnson, pianist Kris Davis, bassist Eivind Opsvik, and drummer Jeff Davis, all of whom also provide vocals on a track with the 14-member Outright! Mixed Choir; another track, "Outright! Theme", features a 30-member jazz band.

Later that year, Irabagon was announced winner of the 2008 Thelonious Monk Jazz Competition by judges Wayne Shorter, Jimmy Heath, Greg Osby, Jane Ira Bloom, and David Sánchez. The award included a cash prize, some of which went toward studies with Roscoe Mitchell, and a contract with Concord Records, the label that released Irabagon's The Observer in 2009. In the first of several dual-disparate-release years, the more conservative album was preceded by I Don't Hear Nothin' But The Blues, a one-track, metal-tinged improvisation with drummer Mike Pride.

In 2010, Firehouse 12 Records released the Mary Halvorson Quintet's Saturn Sings, the first of four releases Irabagon recorded with the composer and guitarist; following the quintet's second album, they appeared on NPR Music's Tiny Desk Concerts. Halvorson and Irabagon continued performing together in various arrangements, and Irabagon appeared on her septet and octet releases.

The New York City Jazz Record named Irabagon a "Musician of the Year" after an extremely active 2012: Irabagon was featured on the acclaimed Be Still, the first of four albums he recorded with the Dave Douglas Quintet, as well as on the Mary Halvorson Quintet's highly lauded Bending Bridges. He officially launched Irabbagast Records, in part because he doubted that his more "extreme" projects would be considered marketable to other labels. He marked Irabbagast's debut with two releases as bandleader: I Don't Hear Nothin' But The Blues Volume 2: Appalachian Haze, a trio with Mick Barr and Mike Pride; and Outright! Unhinged, his quintet with Ralph Alessi, Jacob Sacks, John Hébert, and Tom Rainey. He was also awarded the National Association of Filipino-Americans' Mabuhay Award.

In 2015, Irabagon again released two albums as leader: Behind the Sky was recorded with his quartet of Luis Perdomo, Yasushi Nakamura, and Rudy Royston, joined by guest Tom Harrell; Inaction is An Action is an experimental solo sopranino saxophone record employing extensive use of extended techniques.

In the 2019 DownBeat International Critics Poll, Irabagon was included in the "Rising Star" listings for tenor saxophone, alto saxophone, and jazz artist.

== Discography ==
"Year" indicates year of release.

=== As leader ===
Year	Title	Label	Additional personnel
2008	Jon Irabagon’s Outright!	Innova	Russ Johnson, Kris Davis, Eivind Opsvik, Jeff Davis
2009	I Don't Hear Nothin' But The Blues	Loyal Label	Mike Pride
2009	The Observer	Concord	Nicholas Payton, Kenny Barron, Rufus Reid, Victor Lewis, Bertha Hope
2010	Foxy	Hot Cup	Barry Altschul, Peter Brendler
2012	I Don't Hear Nothin' But The Blues Volume 2: Appalachian Haze	Irabbagast Records	Mick Barr, Mike Pride
2012	Outright! Unhinged	Irabbagast	Ralph Alessi, Jacob Sacks, John Hébert, Tom Rainey
2014	It Takes All Kinds	Jazzwerkstatt / Irabbagast	Barry Altschul, Mark Helias
2015	Behind the Sky	Irabbagast	Luis Perdomo, Yasushi Nakamura, Rudy Royston ft. Tom Harrell
2015	Inaction is An Action	Irabbagast	
2018	Dr. Quixotic’s Traveling Exotics	Irabbagast	Tim Hagans, Luis Perdomo, Yasushi Nakamura, Rudy Royston
2019	Invisible Horizon	Irabbagast	Mivos Quartet, Matt Mitchell
2020	I Don't Hear Nothin' But The Blues Volume 3: Anatomical Snuffbox	Irabbagast	Ava Mendoza, Mick Barr, Mike Pride

=== As co-leader ===
Year	Leader	Title	Label
2005	Mark Anderson / Andrew Bain / Irabagon / Alex Smith	Confluence	For the Artist
2008	RIDD Quartet (Kris Davis, Irabagon, Reuben Radding, Jeff Davis)	Fiction Avalanche	Clean Feed
2011	Irabagon / Andrew Neff / Danny Fox / Scott Ritchie / Alex Wyatt	Here Be Dragons	Fresh Sound New Talent
2013	Irabagon / Hernani Faustino / Gabriel Ferrandini	Absolute Zero	Not Two
2014	Sylvain Rifflet & Irabagon	Perpetual Motion	Jazz Village
2017	Irabagon / John Hegre / Nils Are Drønen	Axis	Rune Grammofon
2017	Irabagon / Joe Fiedler / Todd Neufeld	In Formation Network	nuscope
2018	Paul Dunmall / Irabagon / James Bashford / Mark Sanders	The Rain Sessions	FMR Records
2020	Dan Blake / Irabagon / Ingrid Laubrock	The Cat of Sadness	Carrier
2020	Irabagon & Andrew Barker	Anemone	Radical Documents
2020	Sylvain Rifflet / Irabagon / Sebastian Boisseau / Jim Black	Rebellion(s)	BMC Records
2026	Jon Irabagon and Dan Oestreicher	Saturday’s Child	Irabbagast Records

=== As sideperson (selected) ===
Year	Leader	Title	Label
2005	Mostly Other People Do the Killing	Mostly Other People Do the Killing	Hot Cup
2007	Mostly Other People Do the Killing	Shamokin!!!	Hot Cup
2008	Mostly Other People Do the Killing	This is Our Moosic	Hot Cup
2009	Anders Svanoe & Irabagon	Duets	Anders Svanoe Music
2010	Mary Halvorson Quintet	Saturn Sings	Firehouse 12
2010	Mostly Other People Do the Killing	Forty Fort	Hot Cup
2011	Mostly Other People Do the Killing	The Coimbra Concert	Clean Feed
2012	Mary Halvorson Quintet	Bending Bridges	Firehouse 12
2012	Dave Douglas Quintet	Be Still	Greenleaf Music
2013	Mostly Other People Do the Killing	Slippery Rock	Hot Cup
2013	Mostly Other People Do the Killing	Red Hot	Hot Cup
2013	Barry Altschul	The 3dom Factor	TUM Records
2013	Mike Pride’s From Bacteria to Boys	Birthing Days	AUM Fidelity
2013	Mary Halvorson Septet	Illusionary Sea	Firehouse 12
2013	Dave Douglas Quintet	Time Travel	Greenleaf
2014	Rudy Royston	303	Greenleaf
2014	Mostly Other People Do the Killing	Blue	Hot Cup
2014	Jay Rosen / Dominic Duval / Demian Richardson / Irabagon	No Prisoners	CIMP
2015	Mostly Other People Do the Killing	Hannover (Live)	Jazzwerkstatt
2015	Dave Douglas Quintet	Brazen Heart	Greenleaf
2015	Mostly Other People Do the Killing	Mauch Chunk	Hot Cup
2015	Mike Pride's From Bacteria to Boys	Betweenwhile	AUM Fidelity
2015	Barry Altschul's 3dom Factor	Tales of the Unforeseen	TUM
2016	Mary Halvorson Octet	Away With You	Firehouse 12
2016	Rudy Royston Trio	Rise of Orion	Greenleaf
2017	Mostly Other People Do the Killing	Loafer’s Hollow	Hot Cup
2017	Barry Altschul's 3dom Factor	Live in Kraków	Not Two
2017	Matt Mitchell	A Pouting Grimace	Pi
2018	William Hooker	Pillars… at the Portal	Mulatta Records
2018	Dave Douglas Quintet	Brazen Heart: Live at Jazz Standard	Greenleaf
2019	Moppa Elliott	Jazz Band/Rock Band/Dance Band	Hot Cup
2021	Barry Altschul's 3dom Factor	Long Tall Sunshine	Not Two
