= Christos Rafalides =

Greek jazz vibraphonist and composer (born 1972)

- Born: Χρήστος Ραφαηλίδης (Christos Rafalides); April 9, 1972 (age 54); Kozani, Greece
- Genres: Jazz
- Occupation: Musician
- Instruments: Vibraphone, marimba
- Years active: Emarel Music
- Website: manhattanvibes.com

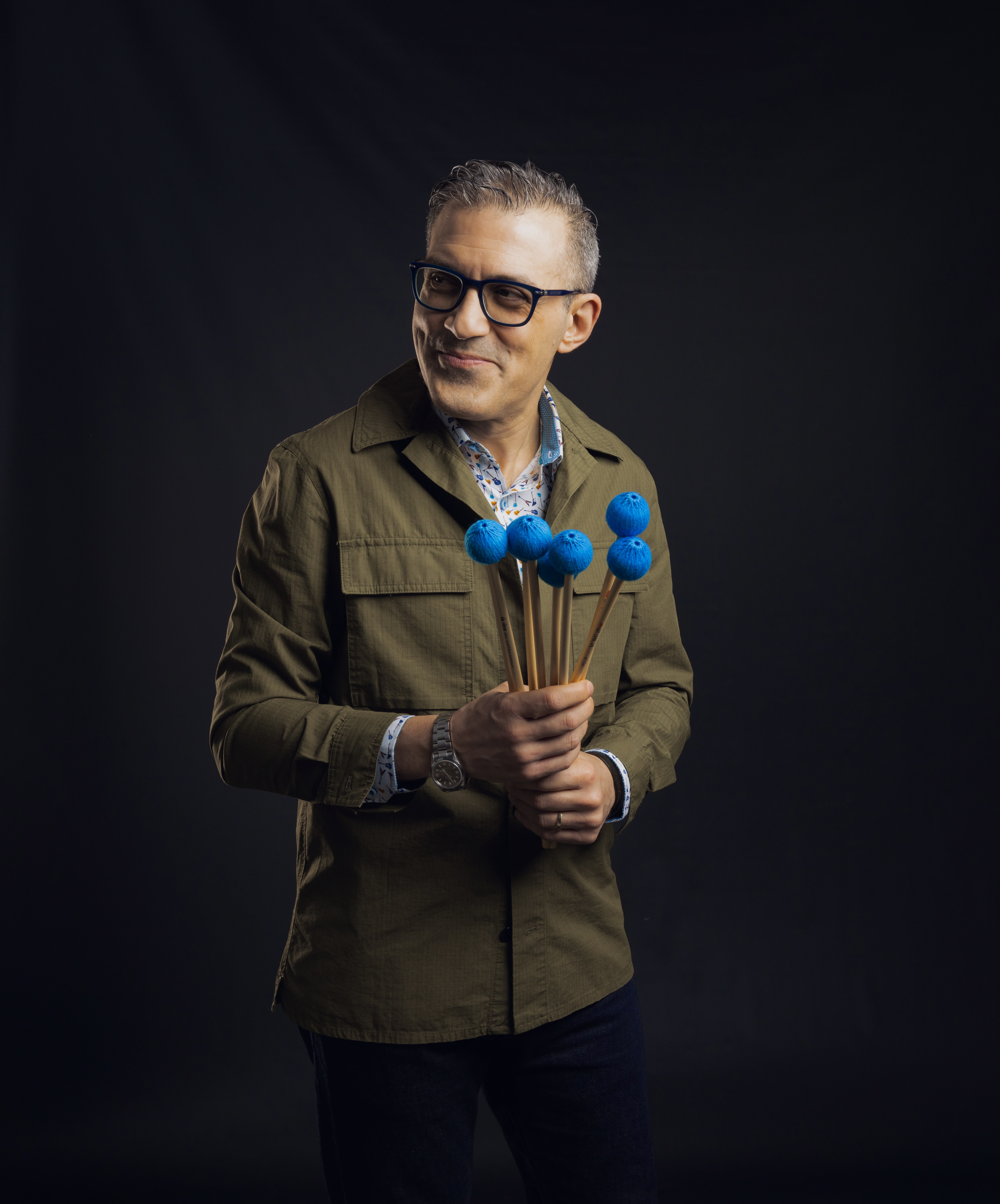
Christos Rafalides holding his 'Vic Firth' M37 signature mallets

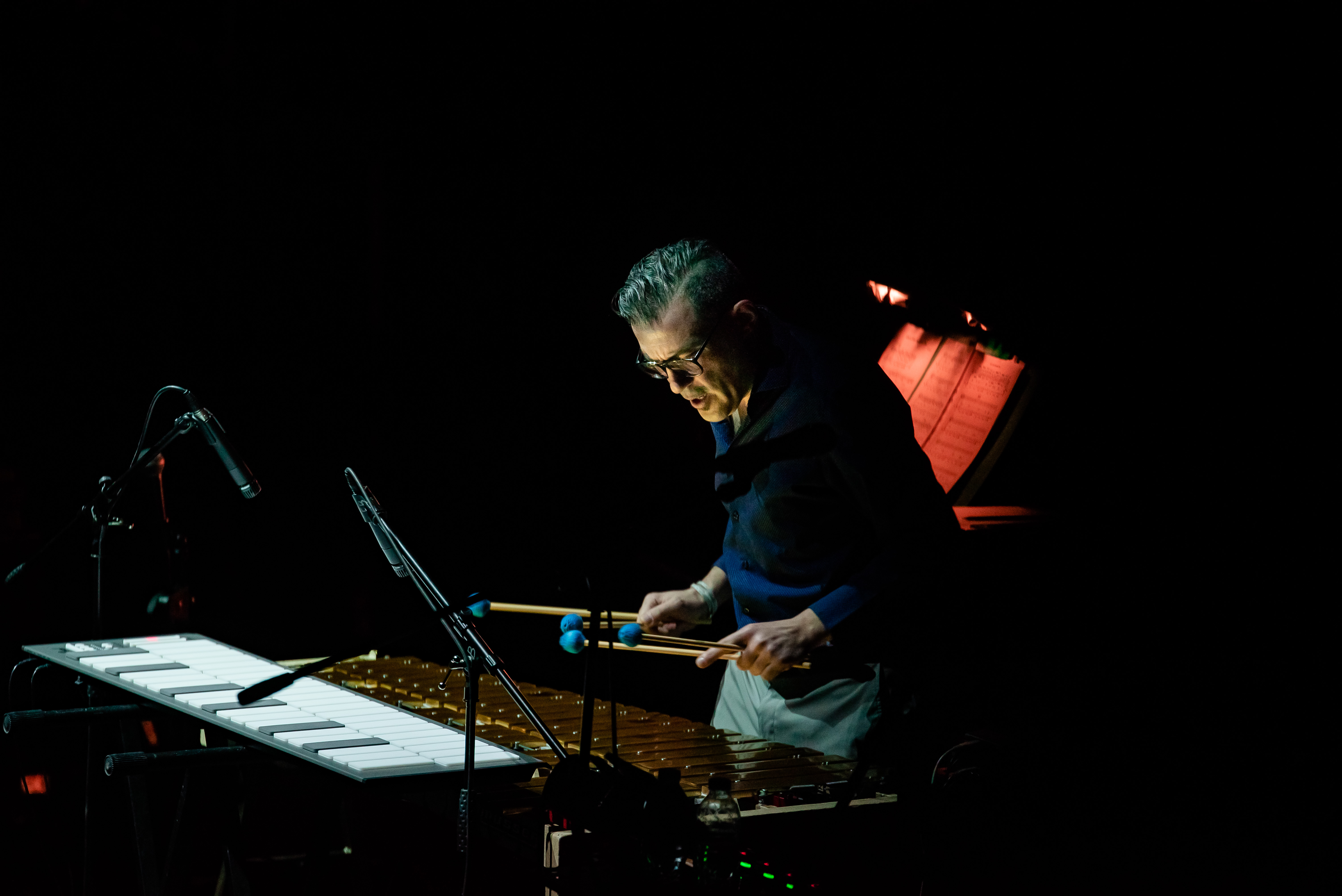
Live at the Olympia Theater in Athens, GR

Christos Rafalides (Greek: Χρήστος Ραφαηλίδης; born 1972, Kozani, Greece) is an acclaimed jazz vibraphonist, composer, and educator based in New York City.

Since moving to New York City, Rafalides has performed with Randy Brecker, Victor Lewis, Chaka Khan, Joe Locke, Antonio Sánchez, Steve Hass, Donny McCaslin, Ronnie Cuber, Ravi Coltrane, Christian McBride, Wynton Marsalis, Mike Stern, and Ron Afif among many others. Rafalides has toured extensively throughout the world both as a leader and guest soloist. Some highlights include performances with the Lincoln Center Jazz Orchestra and Wynton Marsalis, a tour with the Charles Mingus “Epitaph Band' featuring bassist Christian McBride and conductor Gunther Schuller, a recording with the Harmony Ensemble of NY of Henry Mancini’s “Peter Gunn” featuring Lew Soloff, a tour through India and China with Dario Boente, a guest faculty member at the Zeltsman Marimba Festival, and an Artist Residency at the “Music Village” in Greece. Christos has led his group 'Manhattan Vibes' at many of New York City's top venues including the Blue Note, the 55 Bar, the Jazz Standard, Smoke Jazz Club, Dizzy's Club Coca-Cola.

== Background ==
Christos Rafalides began playing music at an early age after the influence of his older brother who played the piano. At age fourteen he began studying classical percussion, and by twenty he had begun working with orchestras around Greece. Rafalides claims he had initially intended to pursue a career as a classical percussionist, until one evening when he heard pianist George Cables in a group with Billy Cobham, “here was this guy, playing with his shoes off, conveying so much feeling through his instrument... I knew I wanted to be able to express myself like that." Rafalides remarked about the event citing this as the moment decided to pursue a career as a jazz musician.

In the early 1990s Rafalides received a scholarship to Berklee College of Music and moved to Boston where he completed his Bachelor of Arts degree studying under Ed Saindon. Following this he moved to New York City to achieve a Master's degree and study with acclaimed jazz vibraphonist Joe Locke at the Manhattan School of Music. During this time Rafalides began to perform within the New York City jazz scene alongside artists including Ravi Coltrane, Antonio Sanchez, Donny McCaslin, Hector Martignon, and Ron Affif.

Rafalides began a recurring band project in the early 2000s named ManhattanVibes. ManhattanVibes sought to combine Latin and other world musical styles imparted by the band members and their stylistically diverse backgrounds. in 2002 ManhattanVibes released a self-titled CD featuring of Grammy Award winner John Benitez on bass and Steve Hass on drums and Randy Brecker on trumpet. Jazz Times' magazine's 2002 Year In Review issue labeled the recording was as, "...one of the top-ten jazz recordings of 2002”.

By 2005 Rafalides had begun a collaboration project with his previous mentor, Joe Locke, which lead to the release of the album 'Van Gogh by Numbers'. This album was debuted live in front of an audience at the 2005 PASIC convention in Columbus, Ohio.

In 2007 Rafalides released a duo album named 'Dark Sand' with American pianist Sergio Salvatore, the duo performed the album at Carnegie Hall, Lincoln Center, and various cities throughout the US and Europe. Rafalides was also hired to perform a series of concerts with the Charles Mingus ‘Epitaph’ Band which featured conductor Gunther Schuller and bassist Christian McBride. He also performed with Wynton Marsalis and the Lincoln Center Jazz Orchestra at Lincoln Center during this year.

In 2008 Rafalides began a project to collaborate with Mimis Plessas a well known Greek composer which culminated in the release of two projects based on Plessas’ music: the album ‘Ηχώ/Echo featuring Evi Siamanda on vocals which consisted of the music of Mimis Plessas and the duo recording ‘We Two’ featuring Mimis Plessas on piano and Christos on vibraphone.

In 2014 Rafalides teamed up with Greek bassist Petros Klampanis to release the duo Bass/Vibes album ‘Point Two.' Stylistically, Point Two combines a number of their influences including styles that are Middle Eastern, Greek, and Latin based to affect the original compositions, standards, and folk songs that make up the album.

In addition to ‘Point Two’ Rafalides collaborated with the ‘Chronos Ensemble’ in 2014 working alongside Greek singer-songwriter, Dimitra Galani. The group went on to release the album ‘Chronos Project'. In 2014 Rafalides also worked on a recording project titled ‘Peter Gunn – (The Music of Henry Mancini)’ with the Harmony Ensemble of NY which featured artists including Lew Soloff, Lew Tabackin, Ronnie Cuber, and Victor Lewis.

Rafalides has been a recurring guest faculty member at the ‘Zeltsman Marimba Festival,’ a summer percussion festival that takes place in different parts of the world each year. Rafalides also has a continuing Artist Residency at the ‘Music Village’ in Greece. He is also on faculty at Queens College teaching private lessons.

Christos is a Musser artist and is playing his signature ‘Christos Rafalides’ mallets made by Mike Balter. He makes his home in NYC.

== Critical reception ==
- All About Jazz has said that "Christos Rafalides is forging a new direction for the vibraphone/marimba, one that ricochets off of the likes of Joe Locke, Bill Ware, Stefon Harris and Gary Burton. Rhythmically driven and spatially exact, Christos Rafalides' music reaches deep into the Latin consciousness and pulls out the perfect vibe."
- Pop Matters has said that "Rafalides has already developed a style that is recognizably his own. Unpretentious, pan-ethnic jazz for today’s tastes..."
- Athinorama has said that Christos "has a long and rich experience next to musicians like Randy Brecker and Ravi Coltrane, but has given his own mark into this multifaceted and multidimensional a New York scene."

== Awards ==
- A spot as one of the top-ten jazz recordings in Jazz Times' magazine's 2002 Year In Review issue for his album Manhattan Vibes

== Selected discography ==
- 2002 – Manhattan Vibes – (Khaeon World Music / Khaeon)
- 2005 – Van Gogh by Numbers – w/Joe Locke (Wire Walker)
- 2008 – Echo - The Music of Mimis Plessas – (Emarel Music)
- 2008 – Dark Sand – (Travelers Road Music)
- 2012 – We Two – Mimis Plessas & Christos Rafalides (Emarel Music)
- 2013 – Blue November – (Emarel Music)
- 2014 – Point Two – (Emarel Music)
- 2017 – Near & Dear – (Emarel Music)
- 2022 – Silver Lining – Giovanni Mirabassi & Christos Rafalides(Emarel Music)
- 2023 – ΗΟΜΕ – (Emarel Music)

Source: All Music

=== With other musicians ===
With Christy Baron

- 'Steppin’' (Chesky Records, 2000)

With Joe Locke

- Van Gogh by Numbers (Wire Walker Music, 2005)

With George Fakanas

- ‘Domino’ w/Mike Stern and Dave Weckl (Nova-Athina Music, 2006)

With Chaka Khan

- 'Do You Hear What I Hear’ (Breaking Records Music, 2006)

With Sergio Salvatore

- 'Dark Sand' (Travelers Road Music, 2008)

With Michael Moore

- 'The Soundtrack to Capitalism, A Love Story' (2008)

With Alkinoos Ioannidis

- ‘Neroponti’ (Cobalt Music, 2009)

With Jovanotti

- 'Oyeah' (Universal Music Italia, 2012)

With The Harmony Ensemble of NY

- Henry Mancini: Music for Peter Gunn contacted by Steven Richman (Harmonia Mundi, 2012)

With Petros Klampanis

- ‘Point Two’ (Emarel Music, 2014)

With Thana Alexa

- ‘Ode to Heroes’ (Harmonia Mundi, 2014)

With Dimitra Galani

- ‘Chronos Project’ (theinsound, 2015)

With Hector Martignon's Banda Grande

- ‘Big Band Theory’ (Zoho, 2016)

With Mauricio Zottarelli

- ‘Upside Down Looking Up’ (Independent, 2017)

With Giovanni Mirabassi

- ‘Silver Lining’ (Emarel Music, 2022)

With Antonio Sánchez (drummer)

- ‘HOME’ (Emarel Music, 2023)
