= Shamokin =

Shamokin may refer to the following:

== Geographical locations ==
- Shamokin, Pennsylvania, a city in Northumberland County
- Shamokin Dam, Pennsylvania, a borough in Snyder County
- Shamokin Township, Pennsylvania
- Shamokin (village), 18th-century Native American settlement near the site of present Sunbury
- Great Shamokin Path, a Native American trail
- Shamokin Area School District, a public school district in Northumberland County
- Shamokin Valley Railroad, in Northumberland County
- Shamokin Creek, a tributary of the Susquehanna River

== Other ==
- Shamokin!!!, a 2007 jazz album by Mostly Other People Do the Killing
