= Stop Time: Live at Prince Street, 1978 =

Live album by Barry Altschul, David Izenzon, and Perry Robinson
- Released: 2023
- Recorded: October 14, 1978
- Venue: 131 Prince Street, New York City
- Genre: Free jazz
- Length: 53:12
- Label: NoBusiness; NBCD 163
- Producer: Danas Mikailionis, Ed Hazell

Barry Altschul chronology
Long Tall Sunshine (2021)	Stop Time: Live at Prince Street, 1978 (2023)

Stop Time: Live at Prince Street, 1978 is an archival live album by drummer Barry Altschul, double bassist David Izenzon (whose name is misspelled as "Izenson" on the cover), and clarinetist Perry Robinson. It was recorded on October 14, 1978, at 131 Prince Street in New York City, and was released in 2023 by NoBusiness Records. The album captures a one-off session, organized by Izenzon, at a time when all three musicians were important and active participants in the New York-based loft jazz scene.

== Reception ==
Professional ratings
Review scores
Source	Rating
All About Jazz	4/5 stars
Tom Hull – on the Web	A−

In a review for All About Jazz, John Sharpe wrote: "While all three musicians are such accomplished improvisers that they are quite capable of extemporizing the repeated motifs and simple folky refrains which adorn each number, there are also sufficient well-turned phrases and shared recurring snags to suggest an overseeing mind; who that might be, though, is lost in the mists of time. However, that is irrelevant to the joy to be had in these playful exchanges from a threesome, at the top of their game, who illuminate the interplay with their individual brilliance."

The editors of The New York City Jazz Record declared the album an "unearthed gem," and reviewer Stuart Broomer remarked: "There are few sounds as heartening as a lost recording by a previously unknown band possessed of collective and individual brilliance. This 45-year-old tape is an exceptional showcase... The cumulative effect of the three musicians is as impressive as some great saxophonists' minimalist trios, just as virtuosic but more egalitarian too."

Point of Departure's Michael Rosenstein commented: "listening to the masterful collective interplay... one would easily assume that this was a long-running ensemble... What strikes the listener immediately is how fluid the roles of the musicians are. From the first notes, they eschew any notion of a traditional reeds/bass/drums trio."

In his contribution to the 18th annual Francis Davis Jazz Critics Poll, Ken Waxman of Jazz Word selected the album as one of the top archival releases of 2023. In a review, he praised Altschul's ability to provide "sympathetic, sophisticated yet strong accents," noting he had "perfected the melding of hard bop power with free jazz multiple tempos." Waxman stated that Robinson "unites the four untitled improvisations with melodic trills and flutters, interjected squeaks and circular squeals and miniature reed bites," while Izenzon's "arco variations are often tinged with melancholy and confidently work up the scale, while his pizzicato work expands with triple stopping pattern."

Writing for the Downtown Music Gallery, Bruce Lee Gallanter wrote: "Everything flows here freely with a stream... The rhythm team here are locked in together... Altschul's playing here is consistently inspired and inventive, occasionally kicking up a storm of rhythmic eruptions."

In an article for WJCT's Jacksonville Music Experience, Daniel A. Brown called the album "an impressive time capsule of high-potency NYC free jazz," and stated that the recording "finds the trio putting their instruments through the paces, yet never allowing their collective virtuosity to hinder the elemental shapes they release."

== Track listing ==
1. "Untitled I" – 12:19
2. "Untitled II" – 6:39
3. "Untitled III" – 14:29
4. "Untitled IV" – 19:45

== Personnel ==
- Perry Robinson – clarinet
- David Izenzon – double bass
- Barry Altschul – drums
