= Steve Hass =

American drummer based in Los Angeles (born 1975)

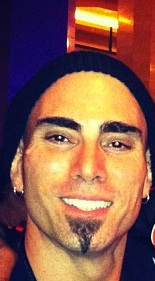
- Steve Hass at 2012 Namm Show

Background information
- Born: Stelios Hasapoglou; May 11, 1975 (age 50); Ronkonkoma, New York, United States
- Genres: Hard rock; jazz; R&B; fusion; rock; bebop jazz; funk; soul; post-bop; pop; Latin; heavy metal
- Occupation: Musician
- Instruments: Drums; backing vocals
- Years active: 1998-present
- Website: www.stevehass.net

Steve Hass (born May 11, 1975) is an American drummer based in Los Angeles. While he is most identifiable with his work involving multiple Grammy winners The Manhattan Transfer, Patti Austin, Cher, John Scofield, Christian McBride as well as Ravi Coltrane. His intense drumming style and musical versatility has paired him with many artists from a wide variety of genres.

== Early life and career ==
Steve Hass was born to Greek immigrant parents from Athens who lived in Island Park on Long Island, New York. After attending Berklee College of Music on scholarship from 1993–1996, Hass joined Ravi Coltrane's first touring group. He toured and recorded with the band from 1996 to 2002. He was also a member of Reuben Wilson's The Masters of Groove where he shared the drum chair with Bernard Purdie. During this period, Hass toured with Christian McBride, Suzanne Vega, Miri Ben-Ari, Bob Berg, and Richard Bona.

In 2003, Hass began touring and recording with multiple Grammy winners and Atlantic recording artists, The Manhattan Transfer. He is featured on three album releases and one live concert DVD. In late 2003, Hass released a solo album named Traveler. His usage of sonic layering and drum loops is reminiscent of Jon Brion.

In 2005, Hass joined John Scofield and Mavis Staples to support Scofield's Verve release That's What I Say: John Scofield Plays the Music of Ray Charles. The band toured around the world from 2005 until December 2007 playing R&B, soul, jazz and Latin music. Scofield also used Hass in his jazz trio, along with bassist John Benitez, for select local New York dates.

Hass' intense drumming style has been compared to that of Elvin Jones. He is listed among Drummerworld's "Top 500 Drummers".

=== Los Angeles ===
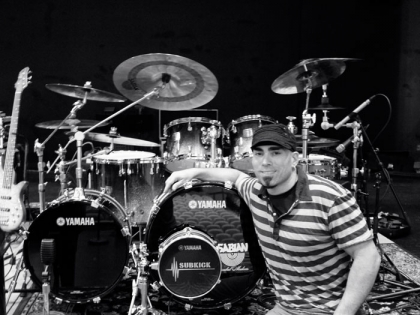
Hass with a set of Yamaha drums

In 2007, Hass moved to Los Angeles, and set up a company called Hassbeat Productions Inc., which provides studio services and video distribution to artists. He also continues to tour with several artists. Since moving to Los Angeles, Hass has become a regular with renowned artists such as Billy Childs, Bob Sheppard, Brandon Fields and Alan Pasqua as well as maintaining his presence in the studio with contemporary rock singer/songwriters. He has participated in recording sessions for producers The Difference, Rami Yadid and Ken Wallace, and tours with R&B/Jazz Grammy winner Patti Austin, fusion/new age pianist Keiko Matsui and The Manhattan Transfer. In 2025 Hass began touring with legendary jazz vocalist Nnenna Freelon, as well as pop/rock singer/songwriter, Richard Marx. Hass also recorded with Freelon on her release Beneath The Skin.

== Musical affiliations ==
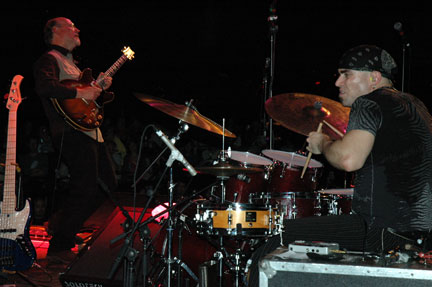
Hass with John Scofield

=== Artists ===
- Mindi Abair
- Ralph Alessi/Ravi Coltrane Group
- Patti Austin
- Miri Ben-Ari
- Bob Berg
- Richard Bona
- Randy Brecker
- Cher
- Billy Childs
- Ravi Coltrane
- Larry Coryell
- Brandon Fields
- Art Garfunkel
- George Garzone
- Debbie Gibson
- Jimmy Haslip
- Jon Hendricks
- Jennifer Love Hewitt
- Anthony Jackson
- Billy Joel
- Stanley Jordan
- Katisse [Buckingham]
- Wayne Krantz
- Abe Laboriel Sr.
- Will Lee
- Timothy Lefebvre
- Jeff Lorber
- Traci Lords
- Wynton Marsalis
- Richard Marx
- Keiko Matsui
- Bob Mintzer
- Dean Parks
- Nicholas Payton
- Danilo Pérez
- Adam Rogers
- Bob Sheppard
- Janis Siegel
- Terell Stafford
- Mavis Staples
- Mark Turner
- Suzanne Vega
- Vinx
- Reuben Wilson
- Lucy Woodward

=== Ensembles ===
- The Alan Pasqua Group
- BBC Big Band
- The Boneshakers
- The Christian McBride Band
- The Count Basie Big Band
- Duke Ellington Orchestra
- East Village Opera Company
- The Jeff Lorber Fusion
- The John Scofield Band (Music Of Ray Charles)
- The John Scofield Trio with John Benitez
- The Lonnie Plaxico Group
- The Manhattan Transfer
- The New York Voices
- The Tierney Sutton Band

== Selected discography ==
Year	Artist	Album
1994	Berklee College of Music	The Berklee All Stars
1996	Mark De Clive-Lowe	Jazz In The Present Tense
1996	Danilo Perez	Hugo Pool Film Soundtrack
1998	Yoshitaka Soji and Joey Calderazzo	Circle Of The Sea
1998	House Of Red	House Of Red
1999	Miri Ben-Ari	Sahara
1999	Nini Camps	LOVE PIE
1999	Darryl Hall	Subtle Touch
2000	Frank Vignola	Deja-Vu
2000	Dana Mase	A Million Miles
2000	Angelo Montrone	Angelo Montrone
2001	Miri Ben-Ari and Wynton Marsalis	Song Of The Promised Land
2001	Matthew Parish	Circles
2001	Frederik Ndoci	Canterina
2002	Christos Rafalides' Manhattan Vibes	Manhattan Vibes
2002	Ravi Coltrane	Mad Six
2003	Cincinnati Pops Orchestra	Got Swing!
2003	Miri Ben-Ari	Temple Of Beautiful
2003	CHER	"Song For The Lonely" Remix
2003	George Colligan	Live At Blues Alley
2003	Steve Hass	Traveler
2004	The Manhattan Transfer	Vibrate
2004	Neshama Carlebach	Journey
2004	Tina Shafer	Promises To Eve
2004	Telarc Records	Telarc Sampler
2004	Dana Mase	Thread Of Blue
2005	The Manhattan Transfer	The Christmas Concert DVD
2005	Alan Paul	Another Place And Time
2006	Janis Siegel	A Thousand Beautiful Things
2006	Janis Siegel	Live In Milan
2006	Kellylee Evans	Fight Or Flight?
2006	The Manhattan Transfer	The Symphony Sessions
2007	Wedding Jimmy (Short Film)	Film Composer and Percussionist
2008	KJ Denhert	Lucky Seven
2009	The Manhattan Transfer	The Chick Corea Songbook
2010	Tim Hauser	Love Stories
2011	Jose Marie Chan	The Manhattan Connection
2011	Ginny Owens	Before You Fly Single
2011	Ginny Owens	Get In I'm Driving
2011	Allegro	Summer Sampler 2011
2011	Judy Wexler	Under A Painted Sky
2012	Dare To Dream	A Minor Inconvenience
2012	Traci Lords	Last Drag
2012	Kristi Salas	Admit It
2012	The Difference	Beats Volume 1
2012	Andrew Ash	Grudges
2012	Ishmael Herring	Right Here
2013	Neshama Carlebach	One And One
2013	Katisse	" A World To The Wise"
2013	Cecilia Margolis-Rami Yadid	"New Sinai Sound"
2013	Traci Lords	"Stupidville"
2013	Judy Wexler	"What I See”
2014	The Mitchell Forman Trio	"Puzzle"
2015	Todd Hunter	"Eat, Drink, Play"
2016	Grace Kelly	"Trying To Figure It Out"
2017	Stephanie Rebecca Patton	"Breath Of Spring"
2019	Judy Wexler	"Crowded Heart"
2019	Gretja Angell	"In Any Key"
2019	Alex Wurman-Netflix	"Between Two Ferns Soundtrack"
2020	Tania Wilk	"Carousel"
2020	Eric FH LAW	"Better Angels"
2020	Formosa Group	"The Walking Dead: Saints and Sinners VR Game Soundtrack"
2020	Dionne Warwick (with Diane Reeves)	"Dionne Warwick And The Voices Of Christmas"
2021	Judy Wexler	"Back To The Garden"
2021	Ryan Christopher	"My Time"
2022	Heather Youmans	"Worth It" Single
2022	Jill Desiree	"Cover Story”
2022	Lennie Revel	"Unbroken"
2023	Scotty Bramer	"Bodhisattva" Video recording
2023	Heather Youmans	"Less Than A Woman" Single
2024	Marcus Wolf	"Rise"
2024	Bob Schlesinger, Mike Stern, and Eddie Gomez	"Falling From Earth"
2024	Cathy Segal-Garcia	"Social Anthems Volume 2"
2025	Judy Wexler	"No Wonder"
2025	Jill Desiree	"Wolves" Single
2025	Jim Oblon	"Live From Aspen's Place"
2025	Nnenna Freelon	"Beneath The Skin"
2025	Heather Youmans	"All The Advice (I Didn't Ask For)" Single
2025	Netflix series	The Wrong Paris Season 1
2025	Bevan Manson	When The Cup Is Lifted
