= Live in Kraków =

Live album by Barry Altschul's 3dom Factor
- Released: 2017
- Recorded: December 4th, 2016
- Venue: Alchemia club, Kraków, Poland
- Genre: Free jazz
- Label: Not Two Records; MW960-2

Barry Altschul chronology
Tales of the Unforeseen (2015)	Live in Kraków (2017)	Long Tall Sunshine (2021)

Live in Kraków is a live album by Barry Altschul's 3dom Factor, led by drummer Altschul, and featuring saxophonist Jon Irabagon and double bassist Joe Fonda. The trio's third release, it was recorded on December 4, 2016, at the Alchemia club in Kraków, Poland, and was issued on CD in 2017 by Not Two Records.

== Reception ==
Professional ratings
Review scores
Source	Rating
All About Jazz	3.5/5 stars
All About Jazz	4/5 stars
The Free Jazz Collective	4/5 stars
Jazzwise	3/5 stars
Tom Hull – on the Web	A−

In a review for All About Jazz, John Sharpe noted that in a "concert setting the group makes the most of the opportunity to stretch out and strut their stuff." He wrote: "Over the four years since their inception, The 3Dom Factor has grown into a real unit, knowing who's capable of what, when and how... It's all done with an unselfconscious joy which brings a smile to the face."

Philip Clark of Jazzwise suggested that the trio's first two releases "were such confident statements that this new one is more about evolution than radical revolution," and stated: "the way these guys mess with time and math, they might well squeeze a fourth album into their trilogy."

Dusted Magazine's Derek Taylor commented: "With Irabagon and Fonda [Altschul's] found partners on par with past peers, willing to embrace freedom without renouncing coherence and structure and most importantly remaining true to a reciprocal means of expression. The condition contained in the band's shorthand moniker is no casual or erroneous claim."

Writing for London Jazz News, Jon Turney remarked: "This is the liberation of 'we'll play anything we want', referencing the entire jazz tradition. You'll hear many facets of that tradition here, at different times, but the results sound as fresh as you could wish for."

In an article for Point of Departure, Bill Shoemaker called the album "a classic old-school club date" and "a fine precis of Barry Altschul’s long, storied career." He wrote: "Throughout, Alschul is the consummate band drummer, his smallest details goosing the band ahead, while his solos confirm a synthesis between form and fire. If polls had a best live concert category, Live in Kraków would garner a lot of votes."

S. Victor Aaron of Something Else! stated that the trio "epitomizes the energy, exuberance and capriciousness of most great jazz," and noted: "After more than four years of developing a sixth sense, the 3dom Factor had reached the point where they're comfortable taking even more chances than before... A galvanizing performance on stage makes it three for three" for the group.

Writer Raul Da Gama commented: "The term 'power trio' is the perfect one to describe the unit that creates the visceral energy which, in turn, swirls around the musical vortex created by Barry Altschul and The 3Dom Factor... It's difficult not to fall hard for a record as fine as this one."

== Track listing ==
1. "Martin's Stew" (Barry Altschul) – 11:46
2. "Ask Me Now" (Thelonious Monk) – 7:28
3. "For Papa Joe, Klook, and Philly Too" (Barry Altschul) – 10:20
4. "Irina" (Barry Altschul) – 8:31
5. "The 3Dom Factor" (Barry Altschul) – 13:56

== Personnel ==
- Barry Altschul – drums
- Jon Irabagon – tenor saxophone, sopranino saxophone
- Joe Fonda – double bass
