= 26-2 =

Song by John Coltrane
- Genre: Jazz

"26-2" is a musical composition written by American jazz musician John Coltrane. The song was recorded by Coltrane in 1960, but it released ten years later by Atlantic Records on an album entitled The Coltrane Legacy with a rhythm section composed of McCoy Tyner on piano, Steve Davis on bass, and Elvin Jones on drums. The composition itself is a contrafact of Charlie Parker's tune "Confirmation", with harmonic alterations to the original chord changes used by Coltrane in a number of his compositions. This harmonic modification is commonly known as Coltrane Changes, which have been most notably used in Coltrane's "Giant Steps". "26-2" is one of several contrafacts by Coltrane, others including "Countdown", a contrafact of Miles Davis's "Tune Up"; and "Satellite" from the album Coltrane's Sound, which is based upon the chord progression of "How High the Moon". Coltrane plays the first statement of the melody on tenor saxophone and switches to soprano saxophone for the last statement of the melody on the recorded version.

== Other recorded versions ==
"26-2" was also covered and recorded by the following:

- Joe Lovano — Quartets: Live at the Village Vanguard (Blue Note, 1995)
- Vic Juris — Pastels (1996)
- Mark Turner — Mark Turner (Warner Bros., 1998)
- Ravi Coltrane — Mad 6 (Eighty-Eights, 2002)
- Jakob Dinesen & Kurt Rosenwinkel — Everything Will Be All Right (Verve, 2002)
- Kenny Werner Trio — With a Song on My Heart, (2008)
- Brownman Electryc Trio — Juggernaut (Browntasauras, 2009)
