= Tales of the Unforeseen =

Studio album by Barry Altschul's 3dom Factor
- Released: 2015
- Recorded: February 11–12, 2014
- Studio: Sear Sound Studios, New York City
- Genre: Free jazz
- Length: 57:32
- Label: TUM Records; CD 044
- Producer: Barry Altschul

Barry Altschul chronology
BBK (2014)	Tales of the Unforeseen (2015)	Live in Kraków (2017)

Tales of the Unforeseen is an album by Barry Altschul's 3dom Factor, led by drummer Altschul, and featuring saxophonist Jon Irabagon and double bassist Joe Fonda. The trio's second release, it was recorded during February 11–12, 2014, at Sear Sound Studios in New York City, and was issued on CD in 2015 by TUM Records.

== Reception ==
Professional ratings
Review scores
Source	Rating
All About Jazz	3.5/5 stars
All About Jazz	4/5 stars
The Free Jazz Collective	5/5 stars
Jazzwise	4/5 stars
Tom Hull – on the Web	A−

In a review for The New York City Jazz Record, Thomas Conrad stated that the album "confirms Irabagon's reputation as one of the most exciting reed players to enter jazz in the new millennium. It reveals that Fonda, under the radar for 40 years, is a special bassist. And it continues the recording comeback of a major drummer."

Karl Ackermann of All About Jazz wrote: "Free improvisation is often license for an abrasiveness that can obscure the substantial intelligence and effort involved in a project but Altschul, Irabagon and Fonda shine in this environment. Their objectives on Tales of the Unforeseen are clear and carried out with considerable refinement amidst all the intricacy." AAJ's John Sharpe commented: "the threesome proves exceptionally well-attuned... Altschul confirms himself a master of free-bop... Fonda is likewise surefooted, purposeful and, crucially, able to conjure structure out of thin air... in Irabagon you have one of the most fluent improvisers on the scene today."

Writing for Point of Departure, Troy Collins noted "the threesome's virtually telepathic interplay," and remarked: "Altschul has long been an advocate of the all-inclusive 'From Ragtime To No Time' concept; nowhere else in Altschul's oeuvre has this idea been as fully realized as by the 3dom Factor."

The Chicago Reader's Peter Margasak called the album "terrific," and stated that it "displays the trio's range, opening with a lengthy group improvisation of breathless reach and moving inside with a smoldering rendition of Monk's 'Ask Me Now.'"

Bret Saunders of The Denver Post included the album in his ten best jazz releases of 2015, writing: "an endlessly energetic drummer propels his trio to beautiful old and new places."

Writer Raul Da Gama stated: "A perfectly appropriate term to describe this well-functioning unit would be 'a power trio' for the visceral and exciting energy that this band generates... The playing here is... polished, characterful and extremely rewarding."

In an article for Something Else!, S. Victor Aaron remarked: "As the musicians in Barry Altschul's 3Dom Factor get better acclimated with each other, the telepathy and audacity gets better, too. The suite-like approach taken for Tales of the Unforeseen strings together the divergent parts into a connected whole. That old school guy Barry Altschul remains on the edge of jazz as much as he ever was."

Daniel Spicer of Jazzwise noted that the album is "less an exercise in pure sonic experimentation and more one of knitting together various different well-established modes and moods," and observed: "it's clear just how much fun everyone's having."

Tales of the Unforeseen was listed as one of the year's top jazz releases in the 2015 NPR Music Jazz Critics Poll.

The editors of The Free Jazz Collective awarded the album a full 5 stars, and reviewer Stefan Wood described the album as "vibrant improvised music, hard edged yet very uptempo," commenting: "There is a sense of empathy and tightness of the trio that recalls the seemingly telepathic communications of Jimmy Giuffre's heralded trio from the early 60's. In some ways, it feels like the 3Dom Factor is a contemporary version of that group."

== Track listing ==
1. "As the Tale Begins" (Barry Altschul, Jon Irabagon and Joe Fonda) – 26:35
2. "A Tale of Monk: Ask Me Now" (Thelonious Monk) – 5:53
3. "The Tale Continues" (Barry Altschul, Jon Irabagon and Joe Fonda) – 4:17
4. "Annette's Tale of Miracles" (Annette Peacock) – 5:36
5. "A Drummer's Tale" (Barry Altschul) – 4:49
6. "And the Tale Ends" (Barry Altschul, Jon Irabagon and Joe Fonda) – 10:39

== Personnel ==
- Barry Altschul – drums, percussion
- Jon Irabagon – tenor saxophone, soprano saxophone, sopranino saxophone, flute
- Joe Fonda – double bass
