= Long Tall Sunshine =

Live album by Barry Altschul's 3dom Factor
- Released: 2021
- Recorded: 2019
- Venue: Europe
- Genre: Free jazz
- Label: Not Two Records; MW1012-2
- Producer: Barry Altschul

Barry Altschul chronology
Live in Kraków (2017)	Long Tall Sunshine (2021)	Stop Time: Live at Prince Street, 1978 (2023)

Long Tall Sunshine is a live album by Barry Altschul's 3dom Factor, led by drummer Altschul, and featuring saxophonist Jon Irabagon and double bassist Joe Fonda. The trio's fourth release, it was recorded during a 2019 European tour, and was issued on CD in 2021 by Not Two Records.

== Reception ==
Professional ratings
Review scores
Source	Rating
All About Jazz	4/5 stars
All About Jazz	3.5/5 stars
All About Jazz	4/5 stars
All About Jazz	4/5 stars
Jazz Journal	3.5/5 stars
Jazzwise	3/5 stars
Tom Hull – on the Web	A−

In an article for The New York Times, Giovanni Russonello called Altschul's drumming "a study in something more than contrast," and wrote: "He knows how to skip across the surface of a beat while also giving it serious heft; his pocket is magnetic, but he'll just as soon dice it up or splatter it to bits." He described the title piece as "brimming and charging but holding back too (thanks especially to Fonda's bass), with a harmonically rangy melody that sets up Irabagon for an uncorked solo."

Selwyn Harris of Jazzwise suggested that listening to the album was like "going back to when jazz was a voice for raw spontaneity and creative excess in the progressive tradition."

Jazz Journal's Peter Gamble noted that "the trio display all the empathy we associate with longstanding collaborators," but commented: "This is not music for a comfortable ride, even if the threesome do display an ability to swing in the conventional sense, for this is mainly improvised stuff on the outer edge."

Writing for The New York City Jazz Record, George Kanzler singled out Irabagon's contribution, stating that he "seems on a quest to expand his playing parameters." On tenor, he "squawks, overblows and slap-tongues notes and sounds outside the normal range of the instrument," while on sopranino, he "pushes the upper limits... amassing skeins of notes while circular breathing."

In an article for The Arts Fuse, Michael Ullman wrote: "Altschul remains a master drummer and bandleader. Long Tall Sunshine pulls off a delightful paradox: it combines in-your-face vigor with subtlety, probing free improvisations with appealing compositions."

Mike Jurkovic of All About Jazz called the album "as great an observation point as any to listen in as three guys tackle time and temper and come out victorious," while writer Karl Ackermann described it as "a compellingly performed collection from a fine trio." AAJ's Dan McClenaghan noted the musicians' "boisterous approach—tumultuous, rumbling muscularity from bassist Fonda and drummer Altschul, bellowing, screeching diatribes from saxophonist Irabagon." He commented: "The group employs a bombastic simpatico that careens away from chaos toward a hell-bent forward momentum which has the feeling of a choreographed assault. A surrender to this... is recommended."

Scott Yanow of LA Jazz Scene stated: "Altschul shows that he has not lost either his power or his creativity through the years... Open-eared listeners will find Long Tall Sunshine to be an invigorating listening experience."

Jazz Word's Ken Waxman remarked: "Energy Music of the highest order, there's delicacy here as well as dissonance... As outside as they become with reed split tones, percussion splatters and weighty string slithering, a kernel of melody is referred to on and off. Fragmented quotes from disguised modern jazz classics lurk just below the surface and are heard in the saxophonist's theme statements and asides."

== Track listing ==
Composed by Barry Altschul

1. "Long Tall Sunshine" – 5:48
2. "The 3dom Factor" – 13:55
3. "Irina" – 4:00
4. "Be Out S'cool" – 8:02
5. "Martin's Stew" – 13:57

== Personnel ==
- Barry Altschul – drums
- Jon Irabagon – tenor saxophone, sopranino saxophone, alto clarinet
- Joe Fonda – double bass
