= Center for Improvisational Music =

Coordinates: 40.67924°N 73.9801°W

The Center for Improvisational Music (or CIM) is a non-profit corporation dedicated to the teaching of jazz and creative music with a heavy emphasis on the inner workings of improvisation. Founded by Ralph Alessi in 2001 and based in Brooklyn, NY, CIM's main project is The School for Improvisational Music (or SIM) which since 2001 has presented 20 workshop series for 800 emerging improvisers from all over the globe. SIM's faculty includes Alessi, Ravi Coltrane, Jim Black, Jason Moran and Steve Coleman among others. The center stages performances and educational workshops, and has hosted an intensive two-week summer program for musicians.
