= Mad 6 =

Studio album by Ravi Coltrane
- Released: 2002
- Label: Eighty-Eights/Columbia
- Producer: Yasohachi Itoh

Ravi Coltrane chronology
From the Round Box (2000)	Mad 6 (2002)	In Flux (2005)

Mad 6 is an album by the American musician Ravi Coltrane, released in 2002. Coltrane supported the album by playing the 2003 Satchmo SummerFest.

== Production ==
Produced by Yasohachi Itoh, the album was recorded over two days in May 2002 in New York City. Coltrane wrote four of the album's tracks. He split the album between two sets of musicians. The drummer Steve Hass is the only quartet member who played on every Mad 6 track; Darryl Hall played bass and George Colligan played piano on some tracks. "26-2" and "Fifth House" are covers of songs by Coltrane's father. "Ask Me Now" is a cover of the Thelonious Monk song. Other songs are by Jimmy Heath and Charles Mingus.

== Critical reception ==
Professional ratings
Review scores
Source	Rating
AllMusic	3.5/5 stars
Birmingham Post	3/5 stars
DownBeat	3.5/5 stars
The Penguin Guide to Jazz Recordings	3/4 stars
Uncut	2/5 stars

JazzTimes called the album "a taut and satisfying outing in the progressive-mainstream vein ... Coltrane's ensemble delivers one forward-thrusting performance after another." The Independent deemed Coltrane "polished, sophisticated, and ever so slightly bland."

The Globe and Mail labeled Coltrane's saxophone solos "smart and stylish at every turn"; the paper later listed Mad 6 among the best albums of 2003. The Hartford Courant considered Coltrane "a solid, expressive player, whether he's digging into original compositions or building on harmonic structures." The Guardian stated that Hass added "a post-techno intensity to every beat."

AllMusic wrote that "the tense, brisk arrangement of ''Round Midnight' suggests the hustle and bustle of Manhattan nightlife at that hour, with a tense rhythm behind his furious soprano sax."

== Track listing ==
No.	Title	Length
1.	"26-2"
2.	"Ginger Bread Boy"
3.	"Avignon"
4.	"The Mad 6"
5.	"Self Portrait in Three Colors"
6.	"Between Lines"
7.	"'Round Midnight"
8.	"The Return of Olymbus"
9.	"Ask Me Now"
10.	"Fifth House"
