= In Flux =

Studio album by Ravi Coltrane
- Released: 2005
- Genre: Jazz
- Length: 54:09
- Label: Savoy Jazz
- Producer: Ravi Coltrane

Ravi Coltrane chronology
Mad 6 (2002)	In Flux (2005)	Blending Times (2009)

In Flux is an album by the American musician Ravi Coltrane, released in 2005. It sold around 3,700 copies in its first year of release. The album title alluded to Coltrane's growth as a musician.

"Away" was nominated for a Grammy Award, in the "Best Jazz Instrumental Solo" category. Coltrane supported In Flux with a North American tour.

== Production ==
The album was produced by Coltrane. "United" is a version of the Wayne Shorter song. "Dear Alice", dedicated to Coltrane's mother, was written in 1986 while Coltrane was in college. Luis Perdomo played piano on In Flux.

== Critical reception ==
Professional ratings
Review scores
Source	Rating
AllMusic	3.5/5 stars
The Encyclopedia of Popular Music	3/5 stars

The New York Times wrote that Coltrane is "fascinated on one hand by miniatures and on the other by the idea of longer songs that sound like collective improvisation from start to finish." The Village Voice stated that "the album's ballads—'Leaving Avignon' and 'Dear Alice' especially—have an air of mystery to them and are all the more lovely for not always behaving like ballads; Perdomo and the others speed up the tempo in response to the tenor's slightest ripple."

The Globe and Mail noted that "the edgiest items here are miniatures, less than two minutes each." The Vancouver Sun deemed the album "a quartet date full of passion and exploration."

AllMusic wrote: "Quietly plugging away at his career, never exploiting his family name and focusing exclusively on deeply intellectual, harmonically complex post-bop, the least you can feel when listening to Coltrane is respect."

== Track listing ==
No.	Title	Length
1.	"The Message Part I"	2:02
2.	"Coincide"	8:19
3.	"Variations III"	1:54
4.	"Away"	6:21
5.	"Leaving Avignon"	3:57
6.	"Blending Times"	3:06
7.	"Dear Alice"	6:06
8.	"Angular Realms"	6:20
9.	"Scramp Vamp"	1:10
10.	"Variations I"	1:49
11.	"United"	8:31
12.	"For Zoë"	4:34
Total length:		54:09
