= Blending Times =

Studio album by Ravi Coltrane
- Released: January 2009
- Recorded: August 14, 2006 – September 17, 2007
- Genres: Jazz; Post-bop
- Length: 56:27
- Label: Savoy Records
- Producer: Ravi Coltrane

Ravi Coltrane chronology
In Flux (2005)	Blending Times (2009)	Spirit Fiction (2012)

Blending Times is Ravi Coltrane's fifth album as a band leader, and second for Savoy Records.

Five of the tracks on this album are group improvisations "conceived and directed by Ravi Coltrane" that don't follow a standard time signature or preset measures lengths, reminiscent of free jazz popularized by Ornette Coleman.

The album's final track, "For Turiya", is a eulogy for Alice Coltrane, Ravi's mother, the wife of John Coltrane and a musician in her own right, who died during the album's recording.

Blending Times reached 36 on Billboard's Jazz Albums Chart, his second time making the chart.

== Track listing ==
All compositions by Ravi Coltrane, except where noted

1. "Shine" (Luis Perdomo) – 5:49
2. "First Circuit" – 3:45
3. "A Still Life" – 6:17
4. "Epistrophy" (Kenny Clarke, Thelonious Monk) – 7:48
5. "Amalgams" – 4:18
6. "Narcined" – 4:49
7. "One Wheeler Will" (Ralph Alessi) – 7:31
8. "The Last Circuit" – 4:18
9. "Before With After" – 2:49
10. "For Turiya" (Charlie Haden) – 9:03

== Personnel ==
Musicians

- Ravi Coltrane – direction, production, tenor saxophone
- Drew Gress – double bass
- Charlie Haden – double bass, guest artist
- Luis Perdomo – piano
- Brandee Younger - harp, guest artist

Technicians, producing, & others

- Brian Dozoretz - engineer
- Steve Genewick – mixing
- Jimmy Katz - photography
- Joe Marciano – engineer
- Anna M. Sala - associate producer
- Joshua Sherman - executive producer
- Allan Tucker – mastering

== Recording notes ==
- Tracks 2,4,5,8: recorded at Bennett's Studio, Engelwood, NJ, August 14 & 15, 2006
- Track 3: recorded at Systems II, Brooklyn, NY, February 27, 2007
- Tracks 1,6,7,9: recorded at Bennett's Studio, Engelwood, NJ, August 20–22, 2007
- Track 10: recorded at Capitol Studios, Los Angeles, CA, September 17, 2007
- Mixed at Capitol Studios, May, 2008
- Mastered at TuckerSound, NYC, September, 2008
