= Rev.elation =

Rev-elation

Live album by Joe Locke
- Released: October 18, 2005
- Recorded: April 6 – 7, 2005
- Venue: Ronnie Scott's Jazz Club, London, England
- Genre: Jazz
- Length: 58:07
- Label: Sharp Nine

Joe Locke chronology
Summertime (2005)	Rev-elation (2005)	Van Gogh by Numbers (2005)

Rev-elation is a jazz album by vibraphonist Joe Locke that was released in 2005. The album was recorded at Ronnie Scott's Jazz Club in London, England, and reached the No. 1 position on the JazzWeek chart in November 2005.

== Track listing ==
1. "The Prophet Speaks" (Milt Jackson)
2. "Young and Foolish" (Albert Hague/Arnold B. Horwitt)
3. "The Look of Love" (Burt Bacharach/Hal David)
4. "Rev-elation" (Mike LeDonne)
5. "Opus de Funk" (Horace Silver)
6. "Close Enough for Love" (Johnny Mandel)
7. "Big Town" (Joe Locke)
8. "Used to Be Jackson" (Brown)

== Personnel ==
- Joe Locke – vibes
- Mike LeDonne – piano, Fender Rhodes
- Bob Cranshaw – bass
- Mickey Roker – drums
