= Florian Weber =

German jazz pianist and composer

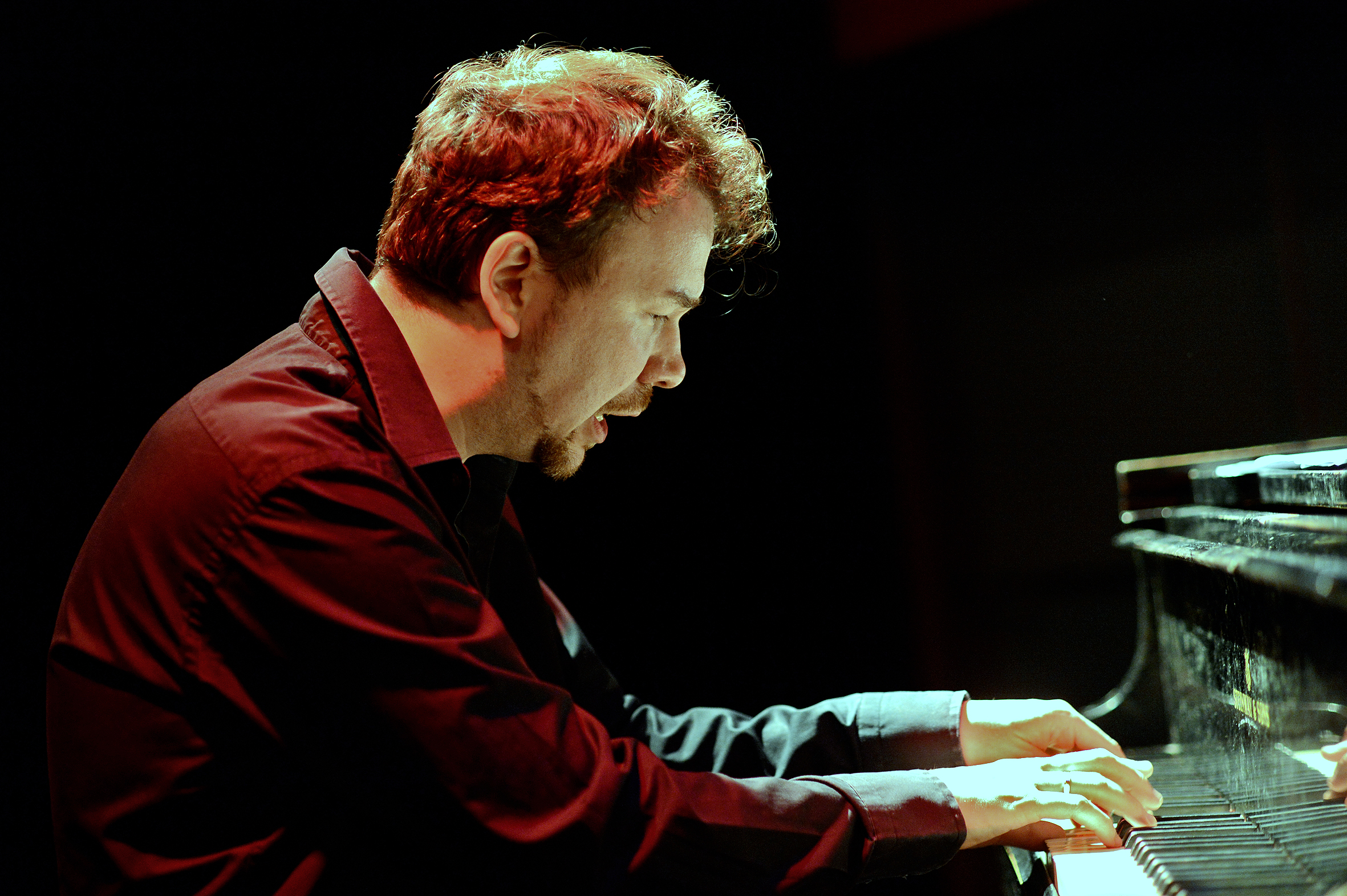
Weber in concert at Stadtgarten Köln, Germany, 7 June 2012

Florian Weber (born 11 November 1977 (Note: AllMusic gives 20 November 1977)) is a German pianist and composer of modern jazz.

== Early life and education ==
Weber was born on 11 November 1977 in Detmold. His family was musical: "his father was a music professor and his mother an opera singer. He began learning the piano at the age of four and had played in both classical and jazz ensembles by the time he left high school." In 1999, he received a scholarship to attend Berklee College of Music in Boston. Later, he studied with John Taylor in Cologne, Joanne Brackeen and Paul Bley in Boston, and Richie Beirach and Lee Konitz in New York.

== Career ==
Together with bassist Jeff Denson and drummer Ziv Ravitz, Weber founded Minsarah (Hebrew for "prism") in 2002. Their 2006 eponymous album was awarded the German Record Critics' Prize.

The saxophonist Lee Konitz began working with the Trio Minsarah in 2006, and the group became a quartet. They began to tour, mainly in the United States. Their first CD, Deep Lee, was released by Enja Records around 2008. A concert was recorded and released as New Quartet Live at the Village Vanguard.

In 2011, Weber founded a group called Biosphere with Lionel Loueke (guitar), Thomas Morgan (bass) and Dan Weiss (drums). Their album Biosphere was released by Enja Records. The same label released Weber's trio album Criss Cross.

Weber recorded the duet album Alba with trumpeter Markus Stockhausen for ECM Records around 2016 and recorded the quartet Lucent Waters for the same label in 2017.

== Awards and honors ==
In 2013, Weber received an Echo Music Prize for best instrumentalist of the year (piano/keyboard). In January 2014, he received the WDR Jazz Prize for jazz improvisation.

== Discography ==
=== As leader/co-leader ===
Year recorded	Title	Label	Notes
2011?	Biosphere	Enja	As Biosphere; quartet, with Lionel Loueke (guitar), Thomas Morgan (bass), Dan Weiss (drums, tabla)
2015?	Criss Cross	Enja	Trio with Donny McCaslin (tenor sax), Dan Weiss (drums)
2016	NYC Five	Intakt	Quintet, with Angelika Niscier (co-led, alto sax), Ralph Alessi (trumpet), Christopher Tordini (double bass), Tyshawn Sorey (drums)
2016?	Alba	ECM	Duo, co-led with Markus Stockhausen (flugelhorn, trumpet)
2017	Lucent Waters	ECM	Quartet, with Ralph Alessi (trumpet), Linda May Han Oh (bass), Nasheet Waits (drums)
