= Spirit Fiction =

Studio album by Ravi Coltrane
- Released: July 19, 2012
- Genre: Post-bop
- Length: 58:53
- Language: Instrumental
- Label: Blue Note
- Producer: Ravi Coltrane and Joe Lovano

Ravi Coltrane chronology
Blending Times (2009)	Spirit Fiction (2012)

Professional ratings
Review scores
Source	Rating
Allmusic	4/5 stars

Spirit Fiction is a sixth solo album by jazz saxophonist Ravi Coltrane, released on July 19, 2012. His solo on the track "Cross Roads" was nominated for the Grammy Award for Best Improvised Jazz Solo for the 2013 ceremony.

== Critical reception ==
In a review for the BBC, Marcus Moore described the release as "jazz the way it’s supposed to be: cool, chaotic, and unassuming."

== Track listing ==
All compositions by Ravi Coltrane, except where noted

1. "Roads Cross" (Ravi Coltrane, Drew Gress, Luis Perdomo, and E. J. Strickland) – 5:04
2. "Klepto" (Ralph Alessi) – 7:30
3. "Spirit Fiction" (Coltrane, Gress, Perdomo, and Strickland) – 2:28
4. "The Change, My Girl" – 6:46
5. "Who Wants Ice Cream" (Alessi) – 6:32
6. "Spring & Hudson" – 2:21
7. "Cross Roads" (Coltrane, Gress, Perdomo, and Strickland) – 4:03
8. "Yellow Cat" (Alessi) – 6:50
9. "Check Out Time" (Ornette Coleman) – 7:26
10. "Fantasm" (Paul Motian) – 4:11
11. "Marilyn & Tammy" – 5:42

== Personnel ==
Musicians

- Ravi Coltrane – mixing, production, soprano and tenor saxophone
- Ralph Alessi – trumpet (tracks 2, 5, 8, 9)
- Geri Allen – piano (tracks 2, 5, 8–10)
- James Genus – double bass (tracks 2, 5, 8, 9)
- Drew Gress – double bass (tracks 1, 3, 4, 7, 11)
- Eric Harland – drums (tracks 2, 5, 8, 9)
- Joe Lovano – liner notes, mixing, production, tenor saxophone (tracks 9–10)
- Luis Perdomo – piano (tracks 1, 3, 4, 7, 11)
- E. J. Strickland – drums (tracks 1, 3, 4, 6, 7, 11)

Additional personnel

- Chris Allen – engineering, mixing
- Darlene DeVita – photography
- Steve Genewick – mixing
- Dave Kowalski – engineering
- Bruce Lundvall – executive production
- Joe Marciano – engineering
- Hayden Miller – art direction, design
- Allan Tucker – mastering
