= Moving Pictures (Ravi Coltrane album) =

Studio album by Ravi Coltrane
- Released: 1998
- Recorded: October 15–17, 1997
- Studio: Sound On Sound Recording, New York City
- Genre: Jazz
- Length: 66:49
- Label: RCA/BMG
- Producer: Steve Coleman

Ravi Coltrane chronology
Moving Pictures (1998)	From the Round Box (2000)

Moving Pictures is the debut album by saxophonist Ravi Coltrane, recorded in 1997 and released on the RCA/BMG label.

== Reception ==
Professional ratings
Review scores
Source	Rating
AllMusic	3/5 stars

Stephen Thomas Erlewine of AllMusic stated, "Coltrane achieves a welcoming, relaxed atmosphere on his first session. It may not offer anything new, but Moving Pictures is a promising debut from a young saxophonist who may have a lot to offer on his own terms". In The Washington Post, Geoffrey Himes noted: "Neither as revolutionary as his father's late recordings nor as conservative as the retro-hard-bop discs released by most youngsters, Coltrane's debut is an impressive, distinctly personal project". All About Jazz said, "The album develops slowly; many songs blend into each other without a pause. Some of the early numbers sound a little meandering... The album's second half is definitely worth hearing, and certainly gives an indication of things to come. It wouldn't surprise me if the next album is better - maybe much better. The talent is there."

== Track listing ==
All compositions by Ravi Coltrane except where noted

1. "Interlude - Thursday" – 2:36
2. "Narcine" – 9:20
3. "Tones for Jobe Kain" – 7:20
4. "In Three for Thee" – 5:06
5. "Peace" (Horace Silver) – 5:39
6. "Search for Peace" (McCoy Tyner) – 7:10
7. "Mixed Media" – 8:22
8. "High Windows" – 6:34
9. "Inner Urge" (Joe Henderson) – 7:50
10. "When You Dream" (Wayne Shorter, Edgy Lee) – 4:39
11. "Outerlude - Still Thursday" – 2:50

== Personnel ==
- Ravi Coltrane – tenor saxophone, soprano saxophone
- Michael Cain – piano
- Lonnie Plaxico - bass
- Jeff "Tain" Watts – drums
- Ralph Alessi – trumpet (tracks 1, 3, 7 & 11)
- Steve Coleman – alto saxophone (tracks 9 & 11)
- Ancient Vibrations: (tracks 1, 6 & 11)
  - Junior Gabu Wedderburn – lead djembe
  - Jeremiah McFarlane – djembe
  - Clyde Wedderburn – djun djun
