= Shamokin!!! =

Studio album by Mostly Other People Do the Killing
- Released: August 2007
- Genre: Jazz
- Length: 74 minutes
- Label: Hot Cup Records

Mostly Other People Do the Killing chronology
Shamokin!!! (2007)	Forty Fort (2010)

Professional ratings
Review scores
Source	Rating
Allmusic	4/5 stars

Shamokin!!! is the second album put out by Mostly Other People Do the Killing. The quartet is led by bassist Moppa Elliot. It is the follow-up to a self-titled record Mostly Other People Do the Killing from 2005 that joined all the personnel forming the band. The album is mostly original songs with "Lover" and "A Night in Tunisia" the only covers.

== Track listing ==
1. "Handsome Eddy"
2. "The Hop Bottom Hop"
3. "Shamokin"
4. "Dunkelbergers"
5. "Factoryville"
6. "Lover"
7. "Andover"
8. "Evans City"
9. "Baden"
10. "A Night in Tunisia"

== Credits ==
- Peter Evans - Trumpet
- Jon Irabagon - Alto Saxophone
- Moppa Elliot - Bass and Compositions
- Kevin Shea - Drums
