= From the Round Box =

Studio album by Ravi Coltrane
- Released: 2000
- Genre: Jazz
- Length: 56:20
- Label: RCA Victor
- Producer: Ravi Coltrane

Ravi Coltrane chronology
Moving Pictures (1998)	From the Round Box (2000)	Mad 6 (2002)

From the Round Box is an album by the American jazz musician Ravi Coltrane, released in 2000.

The album peaked at No. 19 on the Billboard Traditional Jazz Albums chart.

== Production ==
Coltrane was joined by the trumpeter Ralph Alessi, the pianist Geri Allen, and the drummer Eric Harland, among others. Coltrane covered songs by Ornette Coleman, Thelonious Monk, and Wayne Shorter.

== Critical reception ==
Professional ratings
Review scores
Source	Rating
AllMusic	3.5/5 stars

The Pitch thought that "neither Alessi nor Coltrane possesses compositional skills that equal their playing ability, so many of the tunes lack both melody and coherence." The New Yorker wrote that the album "reveals the winning combination of a full-throated horn sound and a meditative demeanor." The Indianapolis Star determined that "if this disc isn't up to the level of last year's Moving Pictures, it still shows that Coltrane's musical journey continues to carry formal integrity and sensuous allure."

The Times concluded that Coltrane's "most distinctive work on this album is on soprano sax—the very instrument that his father helped to repopularise in the 1960s." The Boston Globe praised the "evocative, thoughtful originals" and "distinctive arrangements of three jazz standards."

AllMusic wrote that "as a leader Ravi Coltrane makes sure this music is stimulating and thought provoking but never incomprehensible."

== Track listing ==
No.	Title	Music	Length
1.	"Social Drones"	Ralph Alessi	5:22
2.	"The Chartreuse Mean"	Ravi Coltrane	8:12
3.	"Word Order"	Ravi Coltrane	6:05
4.	"Blues a La Carte"	Wayne Shorter	7:03
5.	"Monk's Mood"	Thelonious Monk	7:21
6.	"Irony"	Ralph Alessi	7:36
7.	"The Blessing"	Ornette Coleman	6:14
8.	"Consequence"	James Carney	4:55
9.	"Between Lines"	Ravi Coltrane	3:32
Total length:			56:20
