= Jamie Baum =

American flautist

- Born: Bridgeport, Connecticut
- Genres: Jazz
- Occupation: Musician
- Instrument: Flute
- Years active: 1990s
- Labels: GM
- Website: jamiebaum.com

Jamie Baum is an American jazz flautist.

== Career ==
Baum grew up in Bridgeport, Connecticut in a musical family. Her mother studied piano and trombone at Juilliard and her parents often took her to New York City for jazz concerts. Baum attended New England Conservatory of Music's Third Stream program, which combined jazz and classical music, but she switched to jazz and graduated from the jazz department. She studied with Jaki Byard. Years later she began the Yard Byard Project, consisting of scores she received from him when she was a student. She received a master's degree in jazz composition from the Manhattan School of Music and became part of the faculty in 2007. She has taught at the New School in New York City and given private lessons and workshops on composition, improvisation, and jazz flute.

In 1999 she founded the Jamie Baum Septet with Ralph Alessi, George Colligan, and Jeff Hirshfield. She went on tour in Asia, Europe, and South America as a member of the jazz ambassadors program sponsored by the State Department.

== Discography ==
=== As leader ===
- 1992 Undercurrents - Konnex (septet)
- 2003 Moving Forward, Standing Still - Omnitone (Septet)
- 2008 Solace - Sunnyside (Septet)
- 2013 In This Life - Sunnyside (Septet)
- 2018 Bridges - Sunnyside (Septet)
