= Darryl Hall (bassist) =

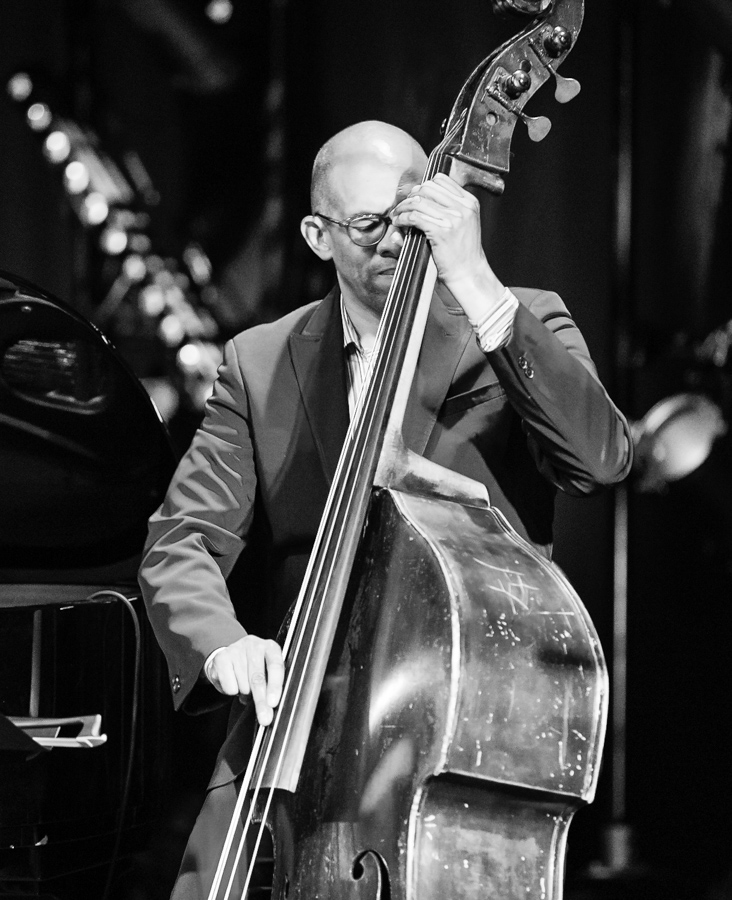
- Darryl Hall at the Kongsberg Jazz Festival, in 2019

Background information
- Born: November 10, 1963 (age 61); Philadelphia, Pennsylvania, US.
- Genres: Jazz, gospel, latin music, soul, R&B
- Occupation(s): Musician, composer
- Instrument: Bass
- Website: darrylhallbassist.com

Darryl Hall (born November 10, 1963) is an American jazz bassist. He was born in Philadelphia and won the Thelonious Monk Institute of Jazz International Bass Competition in 1995.

He played on Ravi Coltrane's Mad 6 and Carmen Lundy's Soul to Soul.

== Discography ==
- Subtle Touch (Dreambox Media, 2000)
- Swingin' Back (Space Time Records, 2019)
- The Warmth of Our Songs (SwinginBack, 2020)
- Life On Hold (SwinginBack, 2020)
- Jazz Up Down and Straight Ahead (SwinginBack, 2021)
