= Luis Perdomo (pianist) =

American jazz pianist and composer (born 1971)

- Perdomo performs with his quartet at the International Jazz Festival of Punta del Este in 2015

Background information
- Born: February 19, 1971; Caracas, Venezuela
- Genre: Jazz
- Occupations: Musician, composer, educator
- Instrument: Piano
- Years active: 1983–present
- Labels: Hot Tone, RKM, Criss Cross Jazz
- Website: luisperdomojazz.com

Luis Perdomo (born February 19, 1971, in Caracas, Venezuela) is an American jazz pianist, composer, and educator.

== Career ==
Perdomo's first paying gig was at age 12. From an early age, he played on Venezuelan TV and radio stations. He says his early gigs in Venezuela were dance music and then traditional Venezuelan music, and that his first jazz gig was at age 15, at a hotel in Venezuela. He says soon after that, he played as the house pianist at Juan Sebastian Bar, a jazz club in Caracas.

Perdomo says he visited New York City at age 19 to check out the music scene, and to absorb and improve his jazz playing, returned later, won a scholarship audition for the Manhattan School of Music, and moved there permanently in 1993 at age 22.

He said, "I used to play, in addition to Juan Sebastian Bar, with a lot of jazz artists. I also had a real good pop gig that was paying a lot of money. I was doing fairly well, but I always thought I was a big fish in a small pond. I didn't want to do that. I wanted to come to New York. I sold all my equipment and moved."

Venezuelan percussionist Marlon Simon claimed Perdomo as one of the 1995 founding members of his band the Nagual Spirits who recorded and toured internationally.

By 2001, Perdomo had arrived on the New York scene "playing hard-punching Latin jazz," as Bill Ratliff wrote in The New York Times. Among other engagements, he appeared as a regular member of Puerto Rican bassist John Benítez's New York trio with drummer Tony Cintron.

In 2001, Perdomo joined saxophonist Ravi Coltrane's superlatively-reviewed quartet with double-bassist Drew Gress and drummer E. J. Strickland. The four toured and recorded together at least until 2012. Perdomo's first album as leader, Focus Point, was produced by Coltrane. Recorded in 2003, it was released by Coltrane's label, RKM Music, in 2005. In a 2012 interview for All About Jazz, Perdomo said about Coltrane, "...whatever he says really makes sense. I totally trust him, blindly. I've played in his band for so many years. He knows what I like, musically. When we're in the studio and he's up there listening, I know he's in touch with what I want to express musically."

In 2000, he joined Miguel Zenón's well-regarded regular band with Hans Glawischnig on bass and Antonio Sanchez on drums. Zenón called it his "dream band." Perdomo and Glawischnig were students together at the Manhattan School of Music and have been making music together on the New York scene since 1993.

In 2016, the pianist led Controlling Ear Unit, a group including drummer Rudy Royston and bassist and vocalist Mimi Jones who is also Perdomo's wife.

In 2017, Perdomo was listed as part of the music faculty at the Aaron Copland School of Music at Queens College in New York. As of 2024 he was still serving there as adjunct professor teaching jazz performance in piano.

In 2021, Perdomo began teaching at the Berklee College of Music, where he is a professor of ensembles and piano. In 2025, Perdomo was appointed Associate Professor of Jazz Piano at Oberlin Conservatory.

In addition to those mentioned elsewhere in this article, Perdomo has played with Robert Hurst, Jamie Baum, John Ellis, JD Allen, Marcus Rojas, Gregg August, Frank Lacy, Shelley Washington, John Patitucci, Ray Barretto, Alice Coltrane, Brian Lynch, David Sanchez, Jerry Bergonzi, Yosvany Terry, David Gilmore, Christian McBride, Jeff (Tain) Watts, George Garzone, Mino Cinélu, Luisito Quintero, Brad Jones, Terreon Gulley, Jon Irabagon, Yasushi Nakamura, Antonio Sanchez, Johnathan Blake, and others.

Ratliff compared his playing style to Steve Coleman, Danilo Perez, Vijay Iyer, and Dave Holland. Others have heard in his music the influence of Chick Corea, Bill Evans, Keith Jarrett, Herbie Hancock, and McCoy Tyner. His own stated influences are Bud Powell, Oscar Peterson, John Coltrane, Albert Ayler, Paul Bley, and Cecil Taylor.

Others he has played with are Ralph Irizarry and Timbalaye, The Vanguard Orchestra, Dave Douglas, Tom Harrell, Henry Threadgill, Steve Turre, Robin Eubanks and Jerry Gonzalez and the Fort Apache Band.

== Education ==
At the age of 10, Perdomo became a student of the Vienna-born Venezuelan musical icon, pianist Gerry Weil, and says he remained Weil's student until age 20.

"The biggest lesson I received from Gerry Weil in Venezuela was to keep my mind open to all types of music," Perdomo said.

At the Manhattan School of Music, where Perdomo earned his Bachelor of Music in 1997, he studied with pianist Harold Danko. Perdomo graduated with a Master's degree from Queens College where he studied with the legendary pianist Sir Roland Hanna.

At the Manhattan School of Music he was also a student of classical pianist Martha Pestalozzi. Luis also cites Jaki Byard as one of his teachers.

== Personal life ==
Perdomo is married to double-bassist and vocalist Mimi Jones with whom he also performs.

== Awards and honors ==
In 2021, Perdomo was nominated for a Latin Grammy Award for Best Latin Jazz/Jazz Album for his work with Zenón on their collaboration album El Arte Del Bolero. In 2022 the album was nominated for a Grammy Award for Best Latin Jazz Album. In 2024, the duo won the Grammy for El Arte Del Bolero Vol. 2.

== Discography as leader ==
=== Focus Point (RKM 2005) ===
Favorably-reviewed Focus Point was Perdomo's first recording as leader. RKM Music released the album in 2005. Produced by Ravi Coltrane who also contributes musically, it features Perdomo in shifting ensembles with drummer Ralph Peterson Jr., saxophonist Miguel Zenón, and bassist Carlo DeRosa. The New York Times called the music "energetically limber."

=== Awareness (RKM 2006) ===
Awareness is Perdomo's 2006 album released by RKM Music. It features him as leader both in a conventional jazz trio and in a less conventional quintet with two bassists and two drummers. Besides Perdomo, consistent personnel on all tracks is bassist Hans Glawischnig and drummer Eric McPherson. Added on the quintet tracks are bassist Henry Grimes and drummer Nasheet Waits. In 2007, highlighting this album, Jason Crane interviewed Perdomo for an episode of the podcast The Jazz Session.

=== Pathways (Criss Cross, 2008) ===
Pathways features Perdomo again with Glawischnig and McPherson. The album is a mixture of Perdomo's originals as well as his arrangements of standards and folk songs. AllMusic's review states, "Of the many piano-bass-drums jazz trio recordings that tumble into the marketplace year after year, this one is notable and a standout from the crowd."

=== Universal Mind (RKM 2012) ===
In 2012, RKM Music released Perdomo's superlatively reviewed Universal Mind, a trio album with bassist Drew Gress and drummer Jack DeJohnette whom Perdomo says had been one of his major musical influences, even back to his early years in Venezuela. The New York Times wrote that "it exudes such strong, uncluttered conviction that it feels like a forward leap."

=== The Infancia Project (Criss Cross 2012) ===
Also in 2012, the Criss Cross label released Perdomo's The Infancia Project which features Perdomo with tenor saxophonist Mark Shim, drummer Ignacio Berroa, percussionist Mauricio Herrera, and bassist Andy Gonzáles. In a "long overdue" and intentional nod to Perdomo's cultural origins, the group performs Latin versions of jazz standards as well as the pianist's own compositions.

=== Links (Criss Cross, 2013) ===
Described by Jazzwise as "a nice change of pace" because of its reliance on more straightahead material that "would be easier to identify with," Links includes Zenón on alto saxophone, bassist Dwayne Burno, and drummer Rodney Green. To pay homage, Perdomo selects some of the music composed by his teachers Sir Roland Hanna, Harold Danko, and Gerry Weil. All About Jazz writes that the album "doesn't rely on any 'gimmicks' for its originality but instead relies on the strength of the improvisers and of the group as a whole to really bring innovation to the music."

=== Twenty-Two (Hot Tone, 2015) ===
Released 22 years after Perdomo moved from Caracas to New York to study music at age 22, this CD features Controlling Ear Unit, his trio with bassist and vocalist Mimi Jones and drummer Rudy Royston. With musical and other callbacks to his teachers during that time and programmatic depictions of New York City and historic Venezuela, the music tells the story of that transitional point in Perdomo's life. "Stimulating" is what Jazziz called this collection of mostly originals, save one cover of the Bee Gees' "How Deep Is Your Love."

=== Montage (Hot Tone, 2016) ===
Responding to Perdomo's solo album Montage, The New York Times wrote in 2016 that the project confirmed "his strong foothold in a modern harmonic continuum."

== Collaborations ==
With Ken Stubbs

- Nomads (CherryK, 2025)
- Southern Soul (CherryK, 2023)

== As a Sideman ==
With George Garzone

- Themes for Good Friends (JoJo Records, 2026)

With Tom Harrell

- Alternate Summer (HighNote Records, 2024)
- Oak Tree (HighNote Records, 2022)

With Jamie Baum

- What Times Are These (Sunnyside Records, 2024)

With Miguel Zenon

- El Arte Del Bolero Vol. 3 (Miel Music, 2026)
- Vanguardia Subterranea (Miel Music, 2025)
- El Arte Del Bolero Vol. 2 (Miel Music, 2023)
- Musica De Las Americas (Miel Music, 2022)
- El Arte Del Bolero (Miel Music, 2021)
- Sonero (Miel Music, 2019)
- Tipico (Miel Music, 2017)
- Identities are Changeable (Miel Music, 2014)
- Alma Adentro:The Puerto Rican Songbook (Marsalis Music, 2011)
- Esta Plena (Marsalis Music, 2009)
- Awake (Marsalis Music, 2008)
- Jibaro (Marsalis Music, 2005)
- Ceremonial (Marsalis Music, 2004)
- Looking Forward (Fresh Sounds New Talent, 2002)

With Ravi Coltrane

- Spirit Fiction (Blue Note, 2012)
- Blending Times (Savoy, 2009)
- Influx (Savoy, 2007)

With David Sanchez

- Tambo (Ropeadope Records, 2026)
- Carib (Stretch Music / Melaza Music / Ropeadope Records, 2019)

With Henry Threadgill

- Double up plays Double up plus (PI, 2018)

With Ray Barretto

- Homage to Art (Sunnyside, 2003)

With David Gilmore

- From Here to Here (Criss Cross Jazz, 2019)
- Energies Of Change (Evolutionary, 2016)
- Numerology Live at the Jazz Standard (Evolutionary, 2013)

With Steve Turre

- Woody's Delight (High Note Records, 2012)

With Jon Irabagon

- Dr Quixotics Traveling Exotics (Irrabagast, 2018)
- Behind The Sky (Irrabagast, 2015)

With Brian Lynch (musician)

- Torch Bearers (Hollistic MusicWorks, 2026)
- 7x7by7 (Hollistic MusicWorks, 2024)
- Spheres of Influence Suite (EWECD 2008)
- ConClave (Criss Cross Jazz, 2004)

With Ben Wolfe

- Fatherhood (Resident Arts Records, 2019)
- Live At Smalls (SL, 2010)
- No Strangers Here (MaxJazz, 2008)

With Ralph Irizarry and Timbalaye

- Timbalaye (Shanachie 1998)
- Best Kept Secret (Shanachie 2000)
- It's Time (BKS Records 2007)

With Gregg August

- Dialogues On Race (Iacuessa Records 2020)
- Four By Six (Iacuessa Records 2012)
- One Peace (Iacuessa Records 2007)

With Yordano

- De Sol a Sol (Sonografica 1992)
- Despues de Todo (Sony Music 2020)
- Ida y Vuelta (Sony Music 2024)
