= Van Gogh by Numbers =

Studio album by Joe Locke and Christos Rafalides
- Released: November 4, 2005
- Genre: Jazz
- Length: 51:13
- Label: Wire Walker

Joe Locke and Christos Rafalides chronology
| Rev.elation (2005) | Van Gogh by Numbers (2005) | Fallen Angel (2006) |

Van Gogh by Numbers is a jazz album by Joe Locke (vibraphone) and Christos Rafalides (marimba). It was released on November 4, 2005 by Wire Walker with the album launch at the Percussive Arts Society International Convention.

== Track listing ==
1. "Van Gogh by Numbers" (Locke)
2. "Sorayia" (Rafalides)
3. "Love Is a Many Splendored Thing" (Sammy Fain/Paul Francis Webster)
4. "Sword of Whispers" (Locke)
5. "Pandora's Dance" (Rafalides)
  - "Suite di Morfeo" (Locke):
6. "Movement #1: Now I Lay Me Down"
7. "Movement #2: Now in Darkness I Dream"
8. "Movement #3: Waking Now, I Wonder"
9. "Danzon En Primavera" (Rafalides)
10. "Blue in Green" (Miles Davis/Bill Evans)

== Personnel ==
- Joe Locke – vibes (marimba 5, 8)
- Christos Rafalides – marimba (vibes 5, 8)
