= Mostly Other People Do the Killing =

American jazz quartet

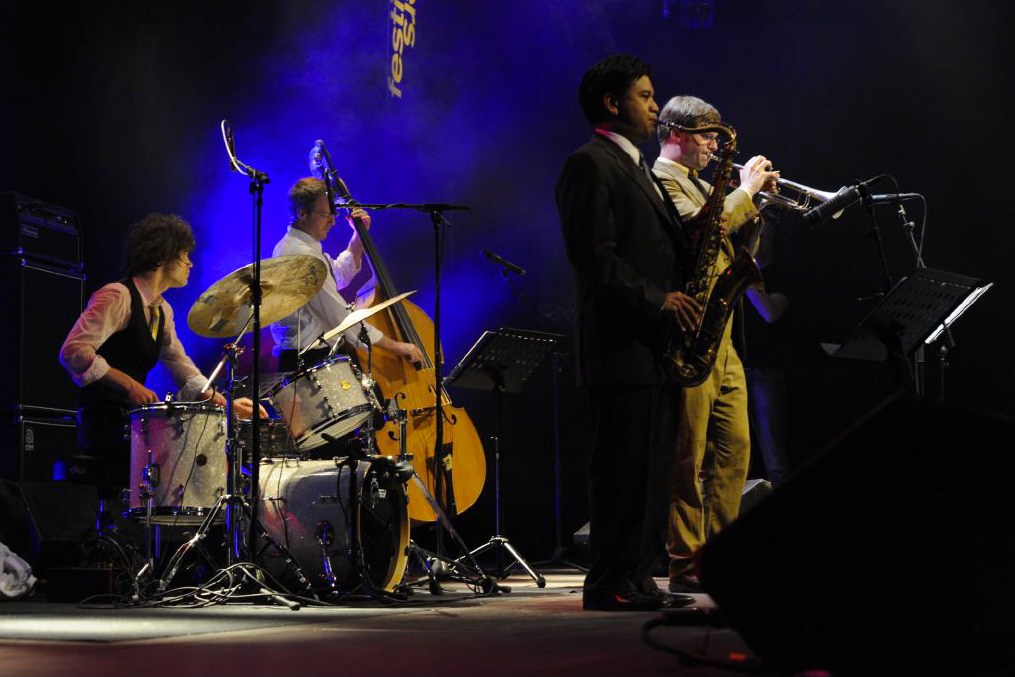
- Mostly Other People Do the Killing, Moers Festival 2009

Background information
- Origin: New York City, New York, United States
- Genres: Jazz
- Years active: 2003–present
- Labels: Hot Cup
- Members: Ron Stabinsky; Matthew "Moppa" Elliott; Kevin Shea
- Past members: Peter Evans; Jon Irabagon

Mostly Other People Do the Killing is a jazz quartet based in New York City including trumpeter Peter Evans, saxophonist Jon Irabagon, bassist Matthew "Moppa" Elliott, and drummer Kevin Shea. The group formed in 2003 and has released several albums on Elliott's Hot Cup label.

== History ==
Bandleader Moppa Elliott met Peter Evans while both were students at the Oberlin Conservatory of Music. Upon relocating to New York City, Elliott met Jon Irabagon through guitarist Jon Lundbom at the Manhattan School of Music and Kevin Shea through Mary Halvorson. MOPDtK performs compositions by Elliott, all of which are arbitrarily named after towns in his native Pennsylvania. Performances often take the form of large suites in which the group transitions between original pieces and jazz standards, often employing theatrics and elements of rock, pop, and classical music.

Mostly Other People Do the Killing performed at the 2009 Moers Festival and has toured in both the U.S. and Europe. Their albums Shamokin!!! and This Is Our Moosic were both included in critics' Top 10 albums of the year.

In 2009, Mostly Other People Do the Killing was the winner of the 57th Annual Downbeat Critics' Poll in the Rising Star Ensemble category. Evans, Irabagon, and Elliott were also included in the poll in the respective categories of Rising Star Trumpet, Rising Star Alto Saxophone, and Rising Star Composer. Jon Irabagon was the winner of the 2008 Thelonious Monk International Jazz Saxophone competition, and released his first album on the Concord Records label. Kevin Shea was named New York City's "Best Drummer" in 2012 by the Village Voice.

In October 2014, they released Blue, a note-for-note reproduction of the Miles Davis album Kind of Blue.

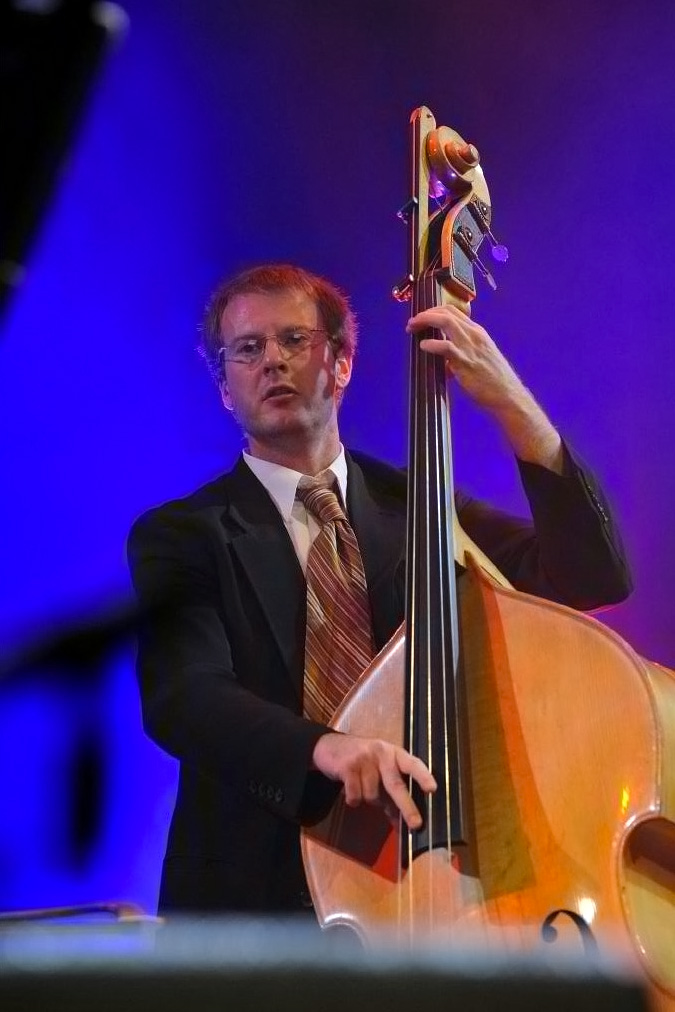
Moppa Elliott

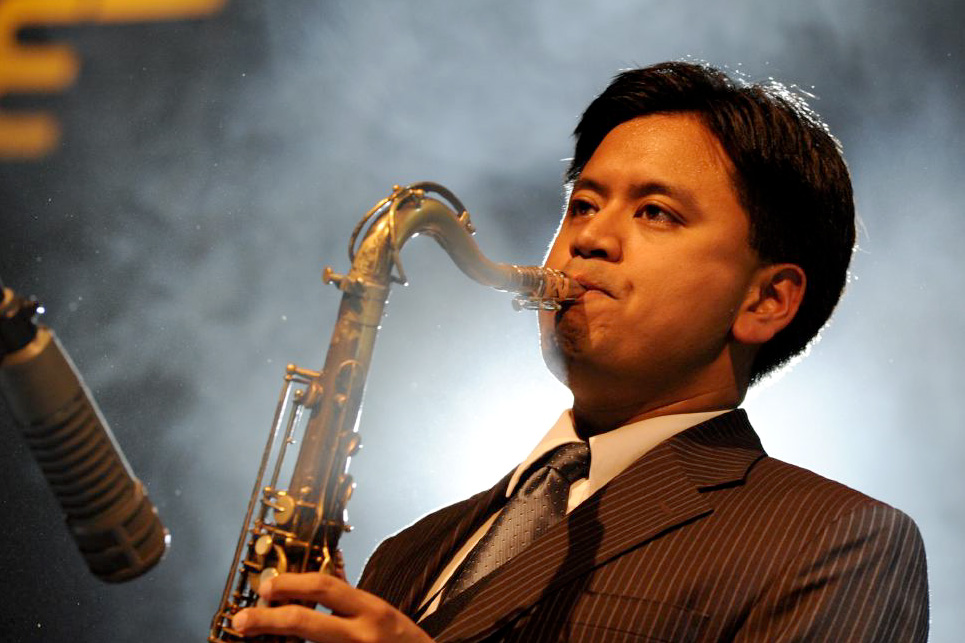
Jon Irabagon

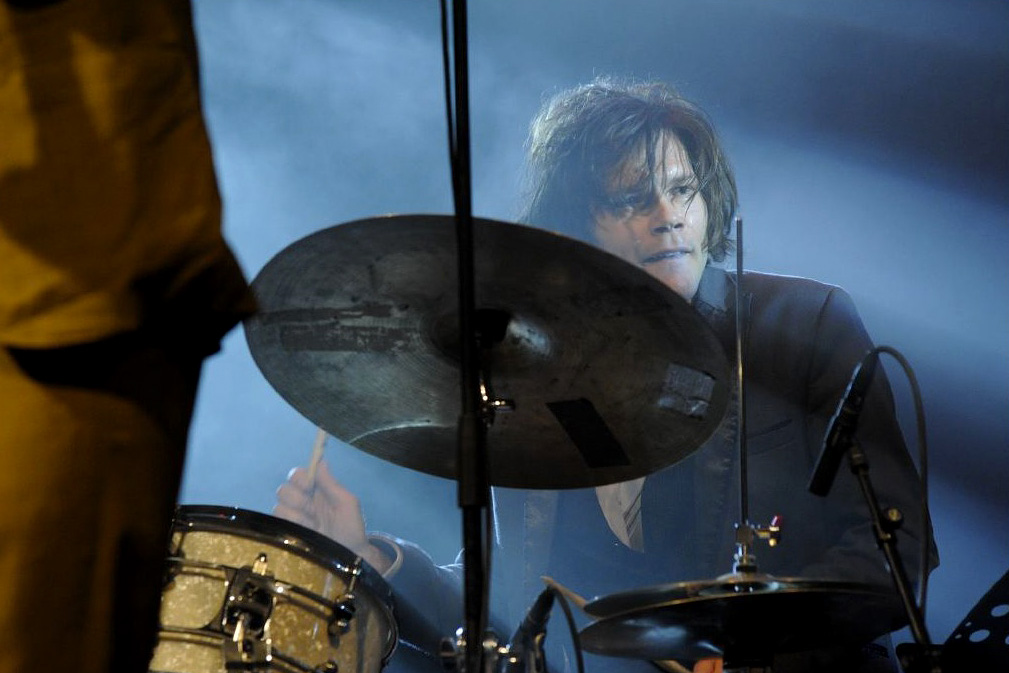
Kevin Shea

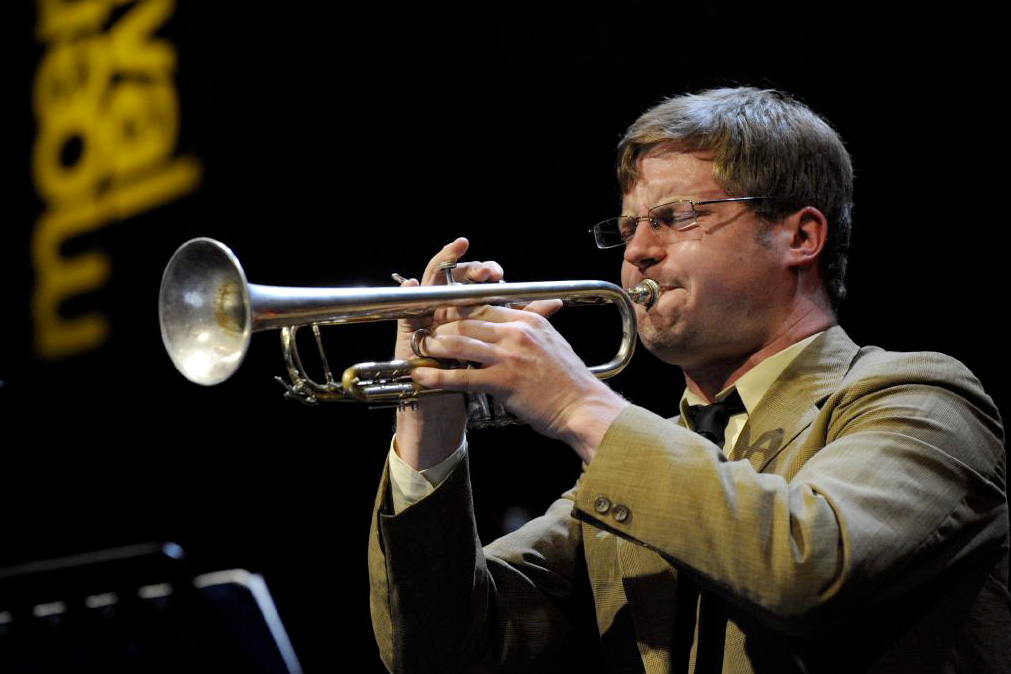
Peter Evans

== Discography ==
- Mostly Other People Do the Killing (2005)
- Shamokin!!! (2007)
- This Is Our Moosic (2008)
- Forty Fort (2010)
- The Coimbra Concert (2011)
- Slippery Rock! (2013)
- Red Hot (2013)
- Blue (2014)
- Mauch Chunk (2015)
- Loafer's Hollow (2016)
- Paint (2017)
- Disasters, Vol. 1 (2022)
