= Kevin Shea (musician) =

American drummer

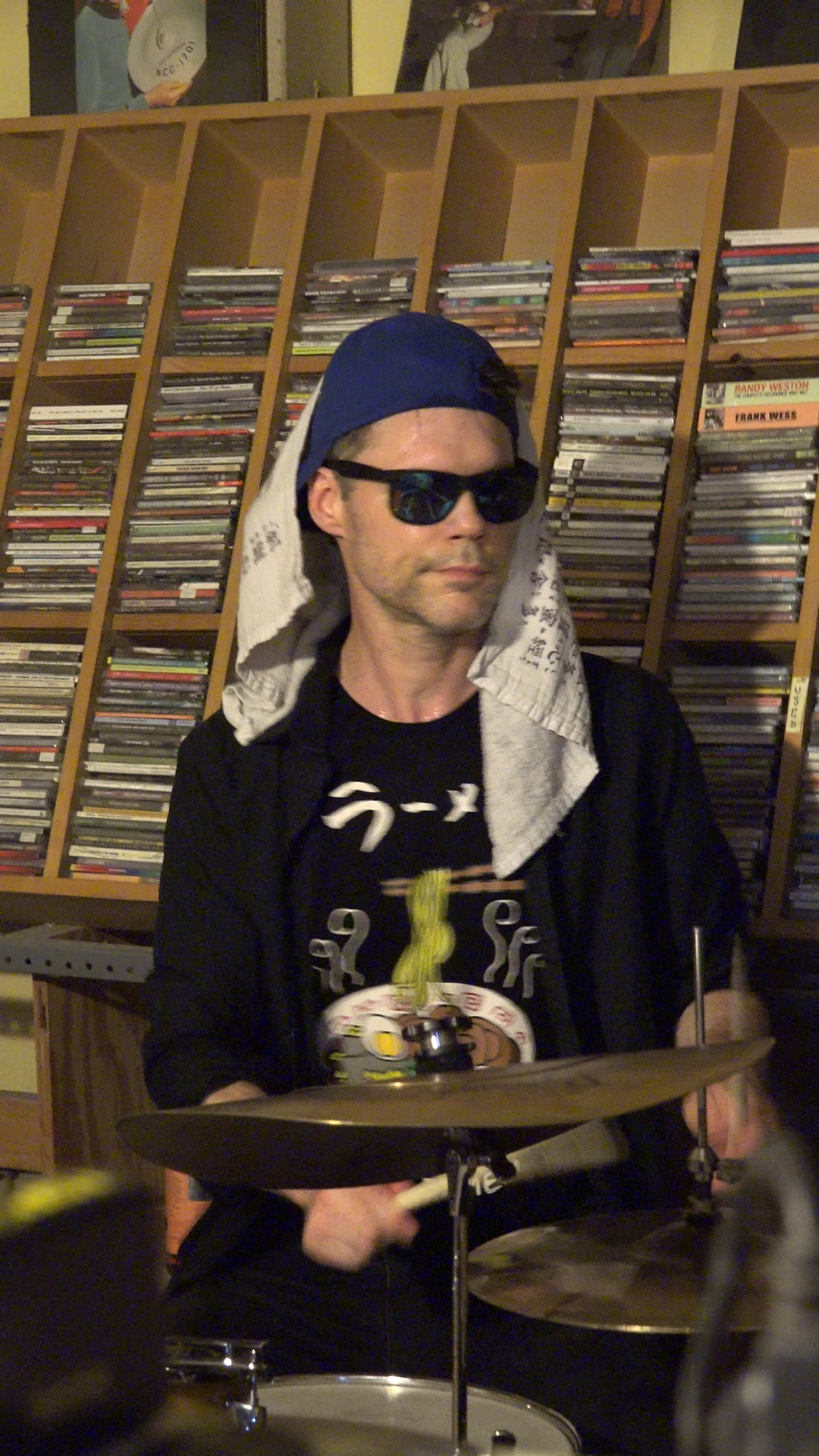
- Kevin Shea playing at Downtown Music Gallery in New York City in 2024

Background information
- Born: 1973 (age 52–53); Minnesota, U.S.
- Genres: Jazz, experimental music
- Occupation: Musician
- Instrument: Drums
- Member of: Mostly Other People Do the Killing

Kevin Shea is an American jazz drummer in improvisation and experimental music. He attended Berklee College of Music.

== Career ==
Shea has played in the avant-garde band Storm & Stress with whom he recorded Storm and Stress (produced by Steve Albini) in 1997 and Under Thunder & Fluorescent Lights (produced by Jim O'Rourke) in 2000. He has also played in the band Coptic Light. The Village Voice named him best drummer of 2012.

He has played with Micah Gaugh, Ian Williams, Daniel Carter, Mary Halvorson, Peter Evans, Mike Pride, and Matt Mottel. He is a member of the bands Talibam!, People, Moppa Elliott's Mostly Other People Do the Killing, Puttin' on the Ritz, and Sexy Thoughts.

== Discography ==
- Storm & Stress with Storm & Stress (Touch and Go, 1997)
- Under Thunder & Fluorescent Lights with Storm & Stress (Touch and Go, 2000)
- Coptic Light with Coptic Light, (No Quarter 2005)
- People with People (I and Ear, 2005)
- Misbegotten Man with People (I and Ear, 2007)
- Bangin' Your Way into the Future with Puttin On the Ritz (Hot Cup, 2008)
- White Light/White Heat with Puttin On the Ritz (Hot Cup, 2010)
- The Big Bang with Alfred Vogel (Boomslang, 2011)
- Untitled with Barr & Dahl (ugEXPLODE, 2012)
- 3 x A Woman with People (Telegraph Harp, 2014)

With Mostly Other People Do the Killing

- Mostly Other People Do the Killing (Hot Cup, 2004)
- Shamokin!!! (Hot Cup, 2007)
- This Is Our Moosic (Hot Cup, 2008)
- Forty Fort (Hot Cup, 2009)
- The Coimbra Concert (Clean Feed, 2011)
- Live at the Newport Jazz Festival (2011)
- Slippery Rock! (Hot Cup, 2012)
- Red Hot (Hot Cup, 2012)
- Blue (Hot Cup, 2014)
- Hannover (Jazzwerkstatt, 2014)
- Mauch Chunk (Hot Cup, 2015)
- Live (For Tune, 2016)
- Paint (Hot Cup, 2017)
- Loafer's Hollow (Hot Cup, 2017)

With Talibam!

- Talibam! (Evolving Ear, 2005)
- Ecstatic Jazz Duos (Thor's Rubber Hammer 2008)
- Boogie in the Breeze Blocks (ESP Disk, 2009)
- The New Nixon Tapes (Roaratorio, 2009)
- Discover AtlantASS (Belly Kids, 2011)
- Puff Up the Volume (Critical Heights, 2012)
- Polyp (MN, 2014)
- Double Automatism (Karl, 2015)
- Hard Vibe (ESP Disk, 2017)
- Ordination of the Globetrotting Conscripts
- Translition 2 Siriusness
- It Is Dangerous to Lean Out

=== As sideman ===
- Rhys Chatham, Outdoor Spell (Northern Spy, 2011)
- Ira Cohen, The Invasion of Thunderbolt Pagoda (Bastet, 2006)
- Peter Evans, The Peter Evans Quartet (Firehouse 12, 2007)
- Peter Evans, Live in Lisbon (Clean Feed, 2010)
- Asmus Tietchens, FT+ (Crouton, 2003)
- Great Lakes, Wild Vision (Loose Trucks, 2016)
- Great Lakes, Ways of Escape
- Great Lakes, Dreaming Too Close to the Edge
- Parts & Labor & Tyondai Braxton, Rise, Rise, Rise (Narnack, 2003)
- Swirlies, Cats of the Wild: Vol. Two (Bubble Core, 2003)
