= Tom Hull (critic) =

American music critic, web designer and former software developer

- Occupations: Music critic; web designer; blogger; software developer
- Writing career
- Period: c. 1975–present
- Website: tomhull.com

Tom Hull is an American music critic, web designer, and former software developer. Hull began writing criticism for The Village Voice in the mid-1970s under the mentorship of its music editor Robert Christgau, but left the field to pursue a career in software design and engineering during the 1980s and 1990s, which earned him the majority of his life's income. In the 2000s, he returned to music reviewing and wrote a jazz column for The Village Voice in the manner of Christgau's "Consumer Guide", alongside contributions to Seattle Weekly, The New Rolling Stone Album Guide, NPR Music, and the webzine Static Multimedia.

Hull's jazz-focused database and blog Tom Hull – on the Web hosts his reviews and information on albums he has surveyed, as well as writings on books, politics, and movies. It shares a functional, low-graphic design with Christgau's website, which Hull also created and maintains as its webmaster.

== Education ==
Hull attended Wichita State University before transferring to Washington University in St. Louis.

== Career ==
In the mid-1970s, Hull accepted a job offer from lead critic Robert Christgau at The Village Voice in New York. His first assignment was to review the 1975 Bachman–Turner Overdrive album Four Wheel Drive. "Unfortunately, the [album] was their worst to date, but Christgau and I had sort of a working class bond over the band", he recalls. While he says Christgau had "welcomed me to New York, and further extended my ears … by 1979 or so my desire to write rock crit was flagging, and everyday life was moving on", citing in part the limited workload afforded to him by the Voice. He left the newspaper around 1980, but would later serve as a resource for Christgau's decade-encompassing "Consumer Guide" collection Christgau's Record Guide: The '80s (1990). Beginning in 1980, Hull worked in software engineering and design, which would earn him most of his life's income. He also worked on free and open source software, such as Linux.

In 2001, Hull created Christgau's website – robertchristgau.com – at the latter's apartment in New York, where Hull's trip from Wichita had been prolonged by the September 11 attacks and the death of his nephew's wife in the World Trade Center. The website made the majority of Christgau's published writings and reviews freely available for public viewing. The idea for the site was conceived by Hull and went into development after Christgau embraced it in mid 2001. Hull's background in software lent him the expertise to create the website, adhering to a minimalist aesthetic favoring text over graphics. After robertchristgau.com went online, Christgau called Hull "a computer genius as well as an excellent and very knowledgeable music critic", and said that "the design of the website, especially its high searchability and small interest in graphics, are his idea of what a useful music site should be." Hull remained involved with the site as webmaster, a role which author and Oxford Brookes University music lecturer Dai Griffiths later applauded. "Anyone who studies Christgau is indebted to Tom Hull for his magisterial work on Christgau's website", Griffiths wrote in 2019 in the academic journal Rock Music Studies.

Hull also created his own online database tomhull.com with a similar design. The site has hosted his past and contemporaneous writings as well as a catalog of primarily jazz-based records and reviews, which adopt the grading schema from Christgau's Consumer Guide: Albums of the '90s (2000). The jazz focus originates from Hull's personal collection, gradually built from reading jazz critics Gary Giddins and Francis Davis in the 1970s and 1980s, and from more thorough research of the jazz canon when Hull lost interest in rock during the 1990s, citing the period's domination by grunge and gangsta rap.

In 2003, Hull was enlisted by Rolling Stone editor Christian Hoard to contribute entries for The New Rolling Stone Album Guide (2004). In February of that year, Hull also began writing "Recycled Goods" – a "Consumer Guide"-style column on archival music releases and reissues – for the Chicago-based webzine Static Multimedia at the behest of its editor Michael Tatum. In 2005, Christgau asked Hull to replace Giddins, who had been The Village Voice's longtime jazz columnist before quitting. Although Christgau was dismissed from the Voice by new ownership the following year, Hull's "Jazz Consumer Guide" continued to be published in the paper for the next several years. During this period, he also contributed to Seattle Weekly.

Hull's "Consumer Guide" reviews encouraged him to survey more jazz records for his own website, which was later expanded as Tom Hull – on the Web to include blog writings on movies, politics, and books. As he explains in 2014, "I've written several million words since 2003, expanded the ratings database from about 10,000 records to 23,000. I've tried to write a bit about everything I've listened to since 2006, so I have at least 10,000 notes on records – some can be called reviews, and some don't quite rise to that level." Christgau, who finds it personally difficult to review jazz in his own writing aesthetic, has since recommended Hull's website for readers seeking advice on jazz albums. In a commentary of Hull's jazz album reviews, Patrick Jarenwattananon of NPR writes:

His picks reflect a remarkably eclectic sensibility, where the mainstream players (Houston Person, Randy Sandke) swim freely among with the modern progressive cats (Kenny Garrett, Donny McCaslin) and the post-modern rearrangers (Rudresh Mahanthappa, Nik Bartsch, Mostly Other People Do the Killing). Seeing as how jazz criticism has historically been dominated by people pushing agendas – e.g. the DownBeat writer who called John Coltrane "anti-jazz" in 1961 – it's nice to see a professional listener with tastes across the spectrum.

Hull has written for NPR Music and worked with Francis Davis in compiling ballots for the project's annual jazz critics poll. He has also voted in DownBeat's annual international critics poll. Information and data from these polls are hosted on his website.

== See also ==
- 1970s in music
- Album era
- Rockism and poptimism

== Bibliography ==
- Anon. (August 2019). "67th Annual Critics Poll - The Critics". DownBeat.
- Brackett, Nathan; Hoard, Christian, eds. (2004). The New Rolling Stone Album Guide (4th ed.). Simon & Schuster. ISBN 0-7432-0169-8.
- Christgau, Robert (1990). "Acknowledgements". Christgau's Record Guide: The '80s. Pantheon Books. ISBN 0-679-73015-X – via robertchristgau.com.
- Christgau, Robert (2002). "Answers from the Dean: Online Exchange with Robert Christgau". RockCritics.com. Archived from the original on December 30, 2018 – via RockCriticsArchives.com.
- Christgau, Robert (September 18, 2018). "Xgau Sez". robertchristgau.com.
- Davis, Francis (December 21, 2015). "The 2015 NPR Music Jazz Critics Poll". A Blog Supreme. NPR.
- Davis, Francis (December 21, 2016). "The 2016 NPR Music Jazz Critics Poll". WBUR.
- Griffiths, Dai (November 19, 2019). "Rock Criticism's Musical Text: Robert Christgau's Writing about Words and Music in Song". Rock Music Studies. 6 (3): 198–216. doi:10.1080/19401159.2019.1692501. S2CID 213809313 – via Taylor & Francis Online.
- Hull, Tom (April 30, 2014). "Tom Hull Answers a Bunch of Questions About Tom Hull, Music Criticism, and RobertChristgau.com". RockCritics.com.
- Hull, Tom (b) (n.d.). "Book: Introduction". tomhull.com.
- Jarenwattananon, Patrick (May 27, 2009). "Grade Inflation and the Jazz Critics". A Blog Supreme. NPR.
