= Ravi Coltrane =

American jazz saxophonist (born 1965)

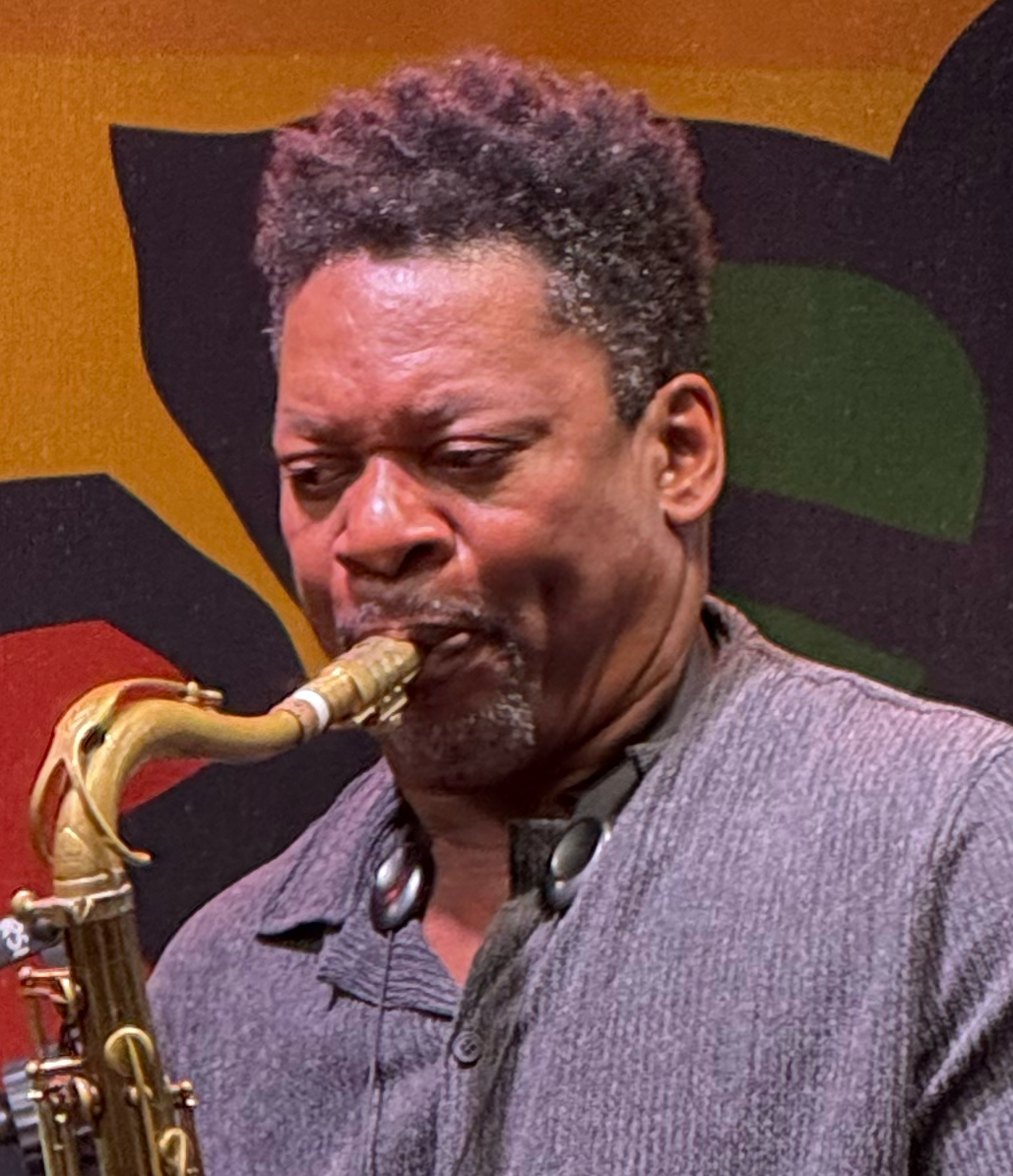
- Coltrane in 2025

Background information
- Born: August 6, 1965 (age 61); Long Island, New York, U.S.
- Genre: Jazz
- Occupations: Musician, record producer
- Instruments: Tenor saxophone, soprano saxophone, clarinet
- Years active: 1991–present
- Labels: RCA, Savoy, Blue Note, ECM
- Website: ravicoltrane.com

Ravi Coltrane (born August 6, 1965) is an American jazz saxophonist. Co-owner of the record label RKM Music, he has produced music for pianist Luis Perdomo, guitarist David Gilmore, and trumpeter Ralph Alessi.

== Early life and education ==
Ravi Coltrane is the son of saxophonist John Coltrane and jazz harpist Alice Coltrane. He is the second born of John and Alice Coltrane's three children; his siblings are John Jr. and Oran. Alice had a daughter Michelle prior to her union with John Coltrane. He is a first cousin once removed of experimental music producer Steven Ellison, aka Flying Lotus. He was raised in Los Angeles, California, and was named after sitar player Ravi Shankar. Ravi Coltrane was less than two years old in 1967 when his father died.

He is a 1983 graduate of El Camino Real High School in Woodland Hills, California. In 1986, he studied music, concentrating on saxophone at the California Institute of the Arts. He has worked often with Steve Coleman, a significant influence on Coltrane's musical conception. Coltrane has also played with Geri Allen, Kenny Barron, McCoy Tyner, Pharoah Sanders, Herbie Hancock, Carlos Santana, Stanley Clarke, Chick Corea, and Branford Marsalis.

== Career ==
In 1997, after performing on over thirty recordings as a sideman, Coltrane recorded Moving Pictures, his first album as leader, working with drummer Jeff "Tain" Watts, bassist Lonnie Plaxico, and pianist Michael Cain. This led to touring with his working band, featuring Andy Milne on piano, drummer Steve Hass, and bassist Lonnie Plaxico. Coltrane's second album, From the Round Box (2000), was recorded with pianist Geri Allen, trumpeter Ralph Alessi, bassist James Genus, and drummer Eric Harland. Mad 6 (2002), Coltrane's first album for Sony, featured drummer Steve Hass, pianist George Colligan, and bassist James Genus. In Flux (2005) included bassist Drew Gress, pianist Luis Perdomo, and drummer E. J. Strickland.

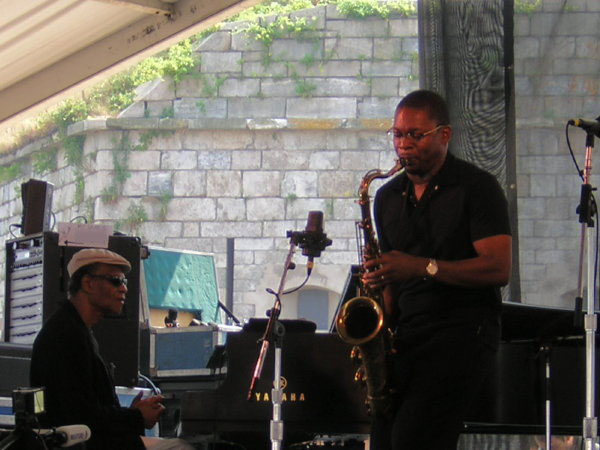
Coltrane (right) and McCoy Tyner performing at the Newport Jazz Festival in August 2005

In January 2005, Coltrane performed in India for the first time as part of a delegation of American jazz musicians sent on a State Department tour to promote HIV/AIDS awareness. Also participating were vocalist Al Jarreau, guitarist Earl Klugh, and pianist George Duke. Performances included a January 16 concert in Mumbai (Bombay), a tribute to Martin Luther King Jr. in Delhi on January 17, and a music festival in Delhi on January 18 organized by violinist L. Subramaniam. Also on January 18, Coltrane performed at the Coltrane Shankar Centre, where Coltrane met with the man he was named after. Picking up a clarinet to engage in an unplanned jam session with a pair of shehnai players, Coltrane said, "I'm a little nervous with the master here."

The Coltrane Quartet played at the Monterey Jazz Festival in 2001 and 2013, the Montreux Jazz Festival and the Newport Jazz Festival in 2004, and the Vienna Jazz Festival in 2005.

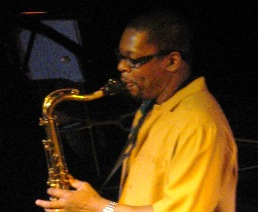
Coltrane in 2007

In 2008, Coltrane became part of the Blue Note 7, a septet formed that year in honor of the 70th anniversary of Blue Note Records. The group recorded an album in 2008 entitled Mosaic, which was released in 2009 by Blue Note/EMI, and toured the United States to promote the album from January to April 2009. The group plays the music of Blue Note Records from various artists, with arrangements by members of the band and Renee Rosnes.

In 2013, he performed at the Village Vanguard. In 2016 he traveled to Australia to play at the opening of Bird's Basement, the first international section of Birdland. The following year he would return to Australia during September to play at The Basement in Sydney and again at Bird's Basement in Melbourne. During his second visit, the quartet consisted of himself, Johnathan Blake, Glenn Zaleski, and Dezron Douglas.

== Personal life ==
Ravi Coltrane was born on August 6, 1965, on Long Island, New York and was named after the Indian sitarist and composer Ravi Shankar. After the death of John Coltrane in 1967, Alice Coltrane moved the family to Los Angeles. At a young age Ravi was sensitive and shy. He took an interest in photography and film and sought to pursue a career in one of the two. He started playing clarinet but switched to the saxophone in high school.

Tragedy struck the family again in 1982 when his older brother John Coltrane Jr. died in a car accident at the age of 17. This event had a profound effect on Ravi and he dropped out of school. Despite the trauma his brother's death caused him, it led him to rediscover his musical origins and influenced his decision to study music. He went on to enroll at the California Institute of the Arts in 1986 where he continued to study music. While struggling to play, he graduated and then moved to an apartment with rehearsal space adjacent to a commercial space in Queens in 1991. From there he collaborated as an apprentice with Elvin Jones, Jack DeJohnette, Wallace Roney, Joanne Brackeen, and Steve Coleman.

In 1991 while playing with Elvin Jones, Coltrane met Kathleen Hennessy, manager of the Regattabar. They married in 1999 and have two sons, William and Aaron. Coltrane lives in Brooklyn, New York and is the Chairman of The Coltrane Home, an organization dedicated to preserving the museum and research center based in John and Alice Coltrane's home in Dix Hills, Long Island.

== Discography ==
=== As leader ===
- 1998: Moving Pictures (RCA/BMG)
- 2000: From the Round Box (RCA)
- 2002: Mad 6 (Sony)
- 2005: In Flux (Savoy Jazz)
- 2009: Blending Times (Savoy)
- 2012: Spirit Fiction (Blue Note)

With The Blue Note 7

- 2009: Mosaic: A Celebration of Blue Note Records (Blue Note/EMI)

With Grand Central

- 1992: Sax Storm (Evidence)
- 1993: The Chase (Evidence)
- 1995: Tenor Enclave: A Tribute to Hank Mobley (Evidence)

With Saxophone Summit

- 2008: Seraphic Light (Telarc)

=== As sideman ===
With Ralph Alessi

- 2011: Wiry Strong (Clean Feed)
- 2019: Imaginary Friends (ECM)

With Rashied Ali

- 2001: No One in Particular (Survival)

With Cindy Blackman

- 1998: In the Now (HighNote)

With Terence Blanchard

- 2013: Magnetic (Blue Note)

With James Carney

- 2020: Pure Heart (Sunnyside Records)

With Billy Childs

- 1996: The Child Within (Shanachie)

With Steve Coleman

- 1994: Steve Coleman & Metrics, A tale of 3 cities, the EP (BMG)
- 1995: Steve Coleman and Five Elements, Def Trance Beat (Modalities of Rhythm) (BMG)
- 1996: Steve Coleman & The Mystic Rhythm Society, The Sign and The Seal (BMG)
- 1998: Steve Coleman and Five Elements, Genesis & the opening of the way (BMG)
- 1999: Steve Coleman and Five Elements, The Sonic Language of Myth (RCA)
- 2004: Steve Coleman and Five Elements, Lucidarium (Label Bleu)

With Scott Colley

- 2002: Initial Wisdom (Palmetto)

With Alice Coltrane

- 2004: Translinear Light (Verve)

With Art Davis

- 1995: A Time Remembered (Jazz Planet)

With Jack DeJohnette

- 2016: In Movement (ECM)

With Dave Douglas

- 2011: Orange Afternoons (Greenleaf)

With Flying Lotus

- 2010: Cosmogramma (Warp)

With David Gilmore

- 2001: Ritualism (The Orchard)

With Elvin Jones

- 1991: In Europe (Enja)
- 1992: Going Home (Enja)

With Ryan Kisor

- 1992: Minor Mutiny (Sony)

With Bheki Mseleku

- 1996: Beauty of the Sunrise (PolyGram)

With Tisziji Muñoz

- 2000: Parallel Reality (Anami)
- 2003: Divine Radiance (Anami)
- 2013: Divine Radiance Live! (Anami)
- 2013: Paul Shaffer Presents: Tisziji Muñoz – Divine Radiance Live! DVD (Anami)
- 2014: Let The Sound Go Forth! (Anami)
- 2014: Healing Waters (Anami)
- 2014: Sky Worlds (Anami)

With David Murray

- 1992: MX (Red Baron)

With Luis Perdomo

- 2005: Focus Point (RKM)

With Wallace Roney

- Munchin' (Muse, 1993)
- Mistérios (Warner Bros., 1994)
- No Job Too Big or Small (Savoy, 1999)

With Bob Thiele Collective

- 1993: Lion Hearted (Red Baron)

With Jeff "Tain" Watts

- 2002: Bar Talk (Columbia)

With Yosuke Yamashita

- 1996: Canvas in Vigor (Universal)
- 1997: Wind of the Age (Verve)

With Brandee Younger

- 2019: Soul Awakening (Independent)

With Glenn Zaleski

- 2014: My Ideal (Sunnyside)

With Jason Palmer

- 2007: Songbook (Ayva Música Producciones)
