= Ralph Alessi =

American jazz trumpeter and composer

- Alessi in 2023

Background information
- Born: Ralph Peter Alessi; March 5, 1963 (age 63); San Francisco, California
- Genres: Jazz
- Occupations: Jazz musician, composer
- Instrument: Trumpet
- Labels: ECM, RKM

Ralph Alessi (born March 5, 1963) is an American jazz trumpeter, composer, and ECM recording artist. Alessi is known as a virtuosic performer whose critically-acclaimed projects include his Baida Quartet, with Jason Moran, Drew Gress, and Nasheet Waits, and This Against That, his quintet with Andy Milne, Gress, Mark Ferber, and Ravi Coltrane. Alessi has also recorded and performed with artists including Steve Coleman, Uri Caine, Fred Hersch, and Don Byron.

Alessi is known for his work as an educator, and in 2001 he founded the School for Improvisational Music in Brooklyn, New York. He has taught at the Eastman School of Music, NYU, NEC, the University of Nevada, Reno, Siena Jazz University, and University of the Arts Bern.

== Early life and career ==
Alessi in 2019

Alessi was born and raised in the San Francisco Bay Area. His parents met as performers at the Metropolitan Opera: his mother, Maria Leone Alessi, sang in the chorus; his father, Joseph Alessi Sr., was principal trumpet for nearly 15 seasons. His brother, Joseph Alessi, is a trombonist with the New York Philharmonic.

Alessi also began as a classical musician, and performed with the San Francisco Symphony and San Francisco Opera in his teens. He later attended the California Institute of the Arts, studying with Charlie Haden while earning a BFA in jazz trumpet performance and MFA in jazz bass performance. In 1986, he met fellow CalArts student Ravi Coltrane, who became one of his longest-standing collaborators. JazzTimes describes their "musical bond" as "arguably developing into a rapport on par with the highest echelon of trumpet/tenor combinations"; Coltrane once gave an interview with NPR focused entirely on his favorite song, Alessi's "Who Wants Ice Cream".

== Select discography ==
=== As leader ===
- Hissy Fit (1999, Love Slave)
- This Against That (2002, RKM)
- Vice & Virtue (2002, RKM)
- Look (2007, Between the Lines)
- Open Season (2009, RKM)
- Cognitive Dissonance (2010, CAM Jazz)
- Wiry Strong (2011, Clean Feed)
- Only Many (2013, CAM Jazz)
- Baida with Jason Moran, Drew Gress, Nasheet Waits (2013, ECM)
- Quiver (2016, ECM)
- Imaginary Friends with Ravi Coltrane, Andy Milne, Drew Gress, Mark Ferber (2019, ECM)
- It's Always Now with Florian Weber, Bänz Oester, Gerry Hemingway (2023, ECM)

=== As sideman ===
With David Ake

- Bridges (Posi-Tone, 2013)
- Humanities (Posi-Tone, 2018)

With Don Byron

- You are #6 (Blue Note, 2001)
- Ivey-Divey (Blue Note, 2006)

With Uri Caine

- The Sidewalks of New York: Tin Pan Alley (Winter & Winter, 1999)
- Gustav Mahler in Toblach (Winter & Winter, 1999)
- The Goldberg Variations (Winter & Winter, 2000)
- Gustav Mahler: Dark Flame (Winter & Winter, 2003)
- Shelf-Life (Winter & Winter, 2005)
- Uri Caine Ensemble Plays Mozart (Winter & Winter, 2006)
- The Othello Syndrome (Winter & Winter, 2009)
- Rhapsody in Blue (Winter & Winter, 2013)

With James Carney

- Fables from the Aqueduct (1994, Jacaranda)
- Offset Rhapsody (1997, Jacaranda)
- Ways & Means (2009, Songlines)

With Steve Coleman

- A Tale of 3 Cities (Novus/BMG, 1994)
- Myths, Modes, and Means (Novus/BMG, 1995)
- The Way of the Cipher (Novus/BMG, 1995)
- The Sign and the Seal (BMG, 1996)
- Genesis (BMG, 1997)
- The Sonic Language of Myth (BMG, 1999)
- Lucidarium (Label Bleu, 2003)

With Ravi Coltrane

- Moving Pictures (RCA/BMG, 1998)
- From the Round Box (RCA, 2000)
- Spirit Fiction (Blue Note, 2012)

With Scott Colley

- 2005: Architect of the Silent Moment (CAM Jazz, 2007)
- 2009: Empire (CAM Jazz, 2010)

With Drew Gress

- 7 Black Butterflies (Premonition, Koch, 2005)
- The Irrational Numbers (Premonition, 2007)
- The Sky Inside (Pirouet, 2013)

With Fred Hersch

- Leaves of Grass (Palmetto, 2005)
- Live from the Jazz Standard/ Fred Hersch Pocket Orchestra (Palmetto, 2009)
- Trio plus 2 (Palmetto)
- Songs Without Words (Nonesuch, 2009)

With Lonnie Plaxico

- With All My Heart (Muse, 1994)
- Emergence (Savoy, 2000)

With Sam Rivers

- Inspiration (RCA, 1999)
- Culmination (BMG France/RCA, 1999)

With Yelena Eckemoff

- Better Than Gold and Silver (L&H, 2018)
- I Am a Stranger in This World (L&H, 2022)

With Others

- Michael Cain, Circa (ECM, 1996)
- Peter Epstein, Polarities (2014)
- Tomas Fujiwara Trio, Variable Bets (Relative Pitch, 2014)
- David Gilmore, Ritualism (2000, Kashka, 2000)
- Tony Malaby, "Novela" (Clean Feed, 2011)
- Jason Moran, Artist in Residence (Blue Note, 2006)
- Enrico Pieranunzi, * Proximity (2015, CamJazz)
- Florian Weber, Lucent Waters (ECM, 2018)
