= El Espíritu Jíbaro =

Studio album by Roswell Rudd and Yomo Toro
- Released: 2007
- Recorded: June 18, 2002; July 23, 2002; January 16, 2003; May 16–17, 2006
- Genre: Latin jazz
- Length: 1:01:20
- Label: Sunnyside Records; SSC-1174
- Producer: Bobby Sanabria, Verna Gillis

Roswell Rudd chronology
Airwalkers (2006)	El Espíritu Jíbaro (2007)	Keep Your Heart Right (2008)

El Espíritu Jíbaro (The Jíbaro Spirit) is an album by trombonist Roswell Rudd and cuatro player Yomo Toro. It was recorded during 2002–2006 at various locations, and was released by Sunnyside Records in 2007 as part of their Soundscape Series. On the album, Rudd and Toro are accompanied by drummer, percussionist Bobby Sanabria and his ensemble Ascensión. Sanabria acted also as co-producer with Verna Gillis and arranger. El Espíritu Jíbaro is a continuation of the cross-cultural experiments that Rudd began pursuing with 2002's Malicool and 2005's Blue Mongol.

== Reception ==
Professional ratings
Review scores
Source	Rating
AllMusic	4/5 stars

In a review for AllMusic, Scott Yanow wrote: "The rhythm sections... are full of power and effortless polyrhythms, there are occasional vocals, and the personnel and instrumentation change from cut to cut, holding one's interest throughout."

Brent Burton of Jazz Times stated that Rudd's "trombone playing has seldom sounded so good," while Toro "can't help but elevate the setting. He's that good."

The Village Voice's Francis Davis commented: "There are no slavish bows to 'authenticity' here: Though the adjoining 'Preludo' and 'El Amor' are respectively identified as a marcha/danza moderna and a bolero moruno in the liner notes, Rudd's arrangements and baleful solos transform them into dirge-like anthems as stirring as the ones Carla Bley showcased him on in the '70s."

Tom Hull praised Rudd for "just being the great trombonist he's always been."

== Track listing ==
1. "Poochie & the Bird" (Roswell Rudd) – 7:34
2. "Tango for Chris" (Roswell Rudd) – 6:44
3. "Tres, Cuatro" (Yomo Toro) – 8:20
4. "Preludio" (Yomo Toro) – 3:52
5. "El Amor" (Yomo Toro) – 11:08
6. "Bamako" (Roswell Rudd, Verna Gillis) – 4:44
7. "Loved by Love" (Roswell Rudd) – 5:46
8. "Inspiración" (Yomo Toro) – 5:55
9. "Mayor G" (Yomo Toro) – 7:03
10. "¡Este Es Yomo Toro!" – 0:35
- Track 1 was recorded at Peter Karl Audio in Brooklyn, New York, on June 18, 2002. Tracks 2, 3 and 5 were recorded at Kaleidoscope Studio in Union City, New Jersey, on May 16–17, 2006. Tracks 4, 6 and 9 were recorded at Systems Two in Brooklyn, New York, on July 23, 2002. Tracks 7, 8 and 10 were recorded at Dangerous Studio on January 16, 2003.

== Personnel ==
- Roswell Rudd – trombone
- Yomo Toro – cuatro, vocals
- Bobby Sanabria – drums, congas, guiro, clave, cencerro on Tres Cuatro, Timbales and guiro on Mayor G, drums/timbales on Poochie and The Bird, drums, Dominican tambora and guira on Bamako
- Jay Collins – tenor saxophone, flute
- Peter Brainin – alto saxophone
- Gene Jefferson – alto saxophone, vocals
- Mike Rodriguez – trumpet
- John Walsh – trumpet
- Chris Washburne – trombone
- Alicia Svigal – violin
- Ilmar Gavillan – violin
- Alessandra Belloni – vocals
- Dalia Silva – vocals
- Marciela Serrano – vocals
- Michelle Silva – vocals
- George Cables – piano
- Igor Atalita – piano
- John DiMartino – organ, piano
- Yeissonn Villamar – piano on Tres Cuatro
- Donald "Spider" Nicks – guitar, bass
- Raúl Jaurena – bandoneon
- David Oquendo – tres
- Alex Hernández – acoustic bass
- Andy Eulau – acoustic bass
- Boris Kozlov – acoustic bass
- Jorge Longo – acoustic bass
- Hiram "El Pavo" Remón – percussion, vocals
- Wilson "Chembo" Corniel – congas on Poochie and The Bird, Mayor G, Bamako

== See also ==
- Jibaro
