= The Definitive Roswell Rudd =

Studio album by Roswell Rudd
- Released: 1979
- Recorded: March 6, 1979
- Studio: Audio Sound Studio, Rome, Italy
- Genre: Jazz
- Label: Horo; HZ 12
- Producer: Aldo Sinesio

Roswell Rudd chronology
Blown Bone (1979)	The Definitive Roswell Rudd (1979)	Regeneration (1983)

The Definitive Roswell Rudd is a solo album by Roswell Rudd. It was recorded in Rome, Italy, in March 1979, and was released later that year by the Italian label Horo Records. On the album, which was produced by Horo founder Aldo Sinesio, Rudd is heard on trombone, piano, bass, drums, and voice, using overdubbing.

According to the album liner notes, "Up Front" is about "four weeks of one-niters: 6000 miles by car, train and boat in the dead of winter all over North Europe, playing honest music." "Keep Your Heart Right" is based on an old Methodist song titled "If Your Heart Keeps Right," and was Rudd's "personal testimony to non-violence in the midst of stormy times." "Keep Your Heart Right" had previously appeared on the Archie Shepp album Archie Shepp Live in San Francisco (1966), and would later appear on the Shepp/Rudd album Live in New York (2001) and the Rudd album Keep Your Heart Right (2008).

Rudd first heard "Laughing on the Outside (Crying on the Inside)", by Bernie Wayne and Ben Raleigh, when he was nine years old, and later put together "a sort of drum and bugle corps" version for concerts in Maine. "One-a-Day Brand Shout" refers to a "sweltering day in June 1978 after eight months of hard Maine winter that lets you know the relief of spring," while "Zeibekiko (Greek Blues)" was influenced by descriptions of Greek music provided by Rudd's cousin. "You Don't See My Face" is part of Rudd's "graffiti oratorio" Taki 183, with a libretto by poet Ralph Romanelli. "Rhythm is King (Melody is Queen)" is based on Rudd's responses to a writer who asked him "If you had to say just one thing about your music, what would it be?"

== Reception ==
Professional ratings
Review scores
Source	Rating
AllMusic	3/5 stars
The Encyclopedia of Popular Music	2/5 stars

Author Francis Davis called the album "an eccentric tour de force," and wrote: "Rudd's sense of himself as first and foremost an ensemble member was so unshakable that when an Italian label invited him to make a solo album, he chose instead to overdub himself." Davis noted that the album was Rudd's "last opportunity to date to record an album of his own compositions."

== Track listing ==
"Laughing on the Outside (Crying on the Inside)" composed by Bernie Wayne and Ben Raleigh. Remaining tracks composed by Roswell Rudd.

1. "Up Front" – 6:08
2. "Keep Your Heart Right" – 3:10
3. "Laughing on the Outside (Crying on the Inside)" – 4:37
4. "One-a-Day Brand Shout" – 8:22
5. "Zeibekiko (Greek Blues)" – 5:55
6. "You Don't See My Face" – 5:20
7. "Rhythm is King (Melody is Queen)" – 13:05

== Personnel ==
- Roswell Rudd – trombone, piano, bass, drums, voice
