= Trombone Tribe =

Studio album by Roswell Rudd
- Released: 2009
- Studio: The Music Shed; Clubhouse Recording Studios; Kaleidoscope Sound; Contre-Jour
- Genre: Jazz
- Length: 58:11
- Label: Sunnyside; SSC 1207
- Producer: Roswell Rudd, Verna Gillis

Roswell Rudd chronology
El Encuentro (2008)	Trombone Tribe (2009)	The Incredible Honk (2011)

Trombone Tribe is an album by trombonist Roswell Rudd. It was recorded at various locations and was released in 2009 by Sunnyside Records. On the album, Rudd appears in different brass band combinations. On five tracks, Rudd appears in a sextet with trombonists Steve Swell and Deborah Weisz, tubist Bob Stewart, bassist and violinist Henry Grimes, and drummer Barry Altschul, while two tracks feature Rudd with five additional trombones plus Altschul. The remaining tracks include members of the bands Bonerama, Sexmob, and the Gangbé Brass Band of Benin.

== Reception ==
Professional ratings
Review scores
Source	Rating
AllMusic	4/5 stars
DownBeat	4.5/5 stars
All About Jazz	4.5/5 stars

In a review for AllMusic, Michael G. Nastos wrote: "[The] playing from top to bottom is fantastic, diversity the watchword as you would expect, and the cohesion of all the groups quite enjoyable from track to track, and never boring. It's a genuine triumph for Roswell Rudd in the golden years of a very successful occupancy in modern music, and comes highly recommended."

DownBeat's Bill Shoemaker called the album "masterful," making a solid case for "unity through diversity," and noted that Rudd "uses rhythm to protean ends, creating multiple feels in a performance."

Raul d'Gama Rose of All About Jazz stated that, on the album, Rudd is "on top of his game," and commented: "He has created a series of songs that traverse myriad geographies, bubbling over through the soul of the vast human Diaspora... It appears that Roswell Rudd can... do no wrong with song and dance that carries the delightful weight of musical history." AAJ's George Kanzler described the album as "a trombone-dominated romp," and suggested that it could be called "The Joy of Trombone." He noted that "this is Rudd's first album featuring brass bands in his half-century career."

Tom Hull remarked: "what do trombone tribes do? Duh, party!"

== Track listing ==
"Twelve Bars with Sexmob" composed by Herbie Nichols. Remaining tracks composed by Roswell Rudd.

1. "FanFare" – 0:26
2. "Elton Dean" – 4:18
3. "Astro Slyde" – 3:37
4. "Hulla Gulla" – 7:41
5. "No End" – 3:03
6. "Hulla Gulla" – 6:37
7. "To the Day" – 5:10
8. "Sand in my Slide Shuffle" – 6:35
9. "Slide & the Family Bone" – 6:52
10. "Twelve Bars with Sexmob" – 6:25

"A Place Above" – 7:35; five parts:

11. "Introduction into Skyward Theme"
12. "Instrumental Doxology"
13. "Vocal Doxology"
14. "Modal Improvisation"
15. "Fan Fare"

== Personnel ==
- Roswell Rudd – trombone
- Deborah Weisz – trombone (tracks 2, 5, 7–9)
- Steve Swell – trombone (tracks 2, 5, 7–9)
- Bob Stewart – tuba (tracks 2, 5, 7–9)
- Henry Grimes – bass, violin (tracks 2, 5, 7–9)
- Barry Altschul – drums (tracks 2–5, 7–9)
- Eddie Bert – trombone (tracks 3, 4)
- Josh Roseman – trombone (tracks 3, 4)
- Ray Anderson – trombone (tracks 3, 4)
- Sam Burtis – trombone (tracks 3, 4)
- Wycliffe Gordon – trombone (tracks 3, 4)
- Matt Perrine – Sousaphone (track 6)
- Craig Klein – trombone (track 6)
- Greg Hicks – trombone (track 6)
- Mark Mullins – trombone (track 6)
- Steve Souter – trombone (track 6)
- Bert Cotton – electric guitar (track 6)
- Eric Bolivar – drums (track 6)
- Briggan Krauss – alto saxophone (track 10)
- Doug Wieselman – clarinet (track 10)
- Steven Bernstein – slide trumpet (track 10)
- Marcus Rojas – tuba (track 10)
- Tony Scherr – bass (track 10)
- Kenny Wollesen – drums (track 10)
- Magliore Ahounandjinou – trumpet (tracks 1, 11–15)
- Eric Yovogan – trumpet (tracks 1, 11–15)
- Martial Ahouandjinou – trombone (tracks 1, 11–15)
- James Vodounnon – tuba (tracks 1, 11–15)
- Lucien Gbaguidi – saxophone (tracks 1, 11–15)
- Benoit Avihoue – percussion (tracks 1, 11–15)
- Crespin Kpitiki – percussion (tracks 1, 11–15)
