= Trombone for Lovers =

Studio album by Roswell Rudd
- Released: 2013
- Studio: Club House; Kaleidoscope Sound; NYC Labor Chorus's Rehearsal Space; Potterville International Sound; Studio IRG
- Genre: Jazz
- Length: 1:00:39
- Label: Sunnyside; SSC 1369
- Producer: Ivan Rubenstein-Gillis, Roswell Rudd

Roswell Rudd chronology
The Incredible Honk (2011)	Trombone for Lovers (2013)	August Love Song (2016)

Trombone for Lovers is an album by trombonist Roswell Rudd featuring Rudd playing well-known tunes in a broad range of ensemble contexts, with varying personnel. It was recorded at various locations, and was released by Sunnyside Records in 2013.

== Reception ==
Professional ratings
Review scores
Source	Rating
PopMatters	8/10 stars

In a review for PopMatters, Brent Faulkner wrote: "Track after track, Rudd's musicianship and sharpness impresses, making Trombone for Lovers shine radiantly."

David Whiteis of Jazz Times stated: "Rudd's timbral and emotional range is as diverse as ever, and his gnarled imprecations keep pop ballads... and novelty-tinged offerings... from getting too cute."

Writing for Latin Jazz Net, Raul Da Gama described the album as "a look at timeless standards, by which he has made them timeless again, re-creating them completely with all their ageless beauty, making them ripple through the flesh and the bone; through body and soul, touching the very nerve endings of the body with notes that are charged with emotion in every muted growl and angular human smear."

Tom Hull commented: "With the 'Joe Hill' suite at the end, this could have been called Trombone for the Masses: I don't mind the rapper there but the NYC Labor Choir takes some getting used to even though I feel like saluting the political point. Everything else is just superb."

Jeff Simon of The Buffalo News remarked: "Here is one of the goofiest jazz discs you'll encounter in a while. All of Rudd's muting – with plungers and otherwise – can't disguise the cognitive dissonance of his use of the trombone as yearning instrument of love."

== Track listing ==
1. "Ghost Riders in the Sky" (Stan Jones) – 3:10
2. "Here, There and Everywhere" (Lennon–McCartney) – 3:33
3. "Baby, It's Cold Outside" (Frank Loesser) – 2:46
4. "Trouble in Mind" (Richard M. Jones) – 5:15
5. "Struttin' with Some Barbecue" (Don Raye, Lil Hardin Armstrong) – 2:11
6. "Sleep Walk" (Santo & Johnny) – 3:01
7. "Autumn Leaves" (Joseph Kosma) – 3:37
8. "Green Onions" (Al Jackson Jr., Booker T. Jones, Lewie Steinberg, Steve Cropper) – 5:27
9. "Tennessee Waltz" (Redd Stewart, Pee Wee King) – 3:57
10. "Come Sunday" (Duke Ellington) – 4:49
11. "Unchained Melody" (Alex North, Hy Zaret) – 4:30
12. "September Song" (Kurt Weill, Maxwell Anderson) – 3:26
13. "Funky Little Sweet Thing - Slow Dance for Fast Times" (Verna Gillis) – 4:00

"Joe Hill" (Alfred Hayes, Earl Robinson): four versions:

14. "Joe Hill: Trombone Solo with Piano Accompaniment" – 3:31
15. "Joe Hill: NYC Labor Chorus and Soloists" – 1:46
16. "Joe Hill: The Relentless Walk" – 3:53
17. "Joe Hill: Joe Hill Will Never Die" – 0:34

== Personnel ==
- Roswell Rudd – trombone
- John Medeski – organ
- Richard Hammond – bass
- Aaron Comess – drums
- Steven Bernstein – slide trumpet (tracks 1, 2, 3, 5, 8)
- Bob Dorough – vocals (track 2)
- Fay Victor – vocals (track 4)
- Rolf Sturm – guitar (tracks 7, 9, 12)
- Michael Doucet – violin (tracks 7, 9, 12)
- Gary Lucas – guitar (track 8)
- Heather Masse – vocals (track 13)
- Matthew Finck – guitar (track 13)
- Ira Coleman – bass (track 13)
- T Xiques – drums (track 13)
- Dennis Nelson – piano (tracks 14, 17)
- NYC Labor Chorus – vocals (tracks 15, 17)
- Betty Ralston – vocals (track 15)
- Judy Kleinberg – vocals (track 15)
- Brent Kramer – vocals (track 15)
- Eugene Hamond – vocals (track 15)
- Susan Zugaib – vocals (track 15)
- Sara Belcher-Barnes – vocals (track 15)
- Denise Jones – vocals (track 15)
- Barbara Bailey – vocals (track 15)
- Jeff Vogel – vocals (track 15)
- Reggie Bennett – vocals (rap) (track 16)
- Jana Ballard – conductor (track 17)
