= Broad Strokes =

Studio album by Roswell Rudd
- Released: 2000
- Recorded: March 1999–January 2000
- Genre: Jazz
- Length: 1:07:22
- Label: Knitting Factory Works; KFW-276
- Producer: Verna Gillis

Roswell Rudd chronology
Monk's Dream (2000)	Broad Strokes (2000)	Eventuality: The Charlie Kohlhase Quintet Plays the Music of Roswell Rudd (2000)

Broad Strokes is an album by trombonist Roswell Rudd. It was recorded during March 1999–January 2000 at various locations, and was released by Knitting Factory Works in 2000. On the album, Rudd appears in a broad range of ensemble contexts, with varying personnel.

== Reception ==
Professional ratings
Review scores
Source	Rating
AllMusic	4/5 stars
The Penguin Guide to Jazz	3/4 stars

In a review for AllMusic, Steve Loewy wrote: "Rudd fans will not wish to pass this recording up, although it is much more an oddity than anything definitive or enduring."

A reviewer for All About Jazz stated: "Overall, this record is for Roswell Rudd fanatics only. If you're new to Rudd, you should check out a record like New York Eye and Ear Control and dig for the roots—instead of listening to a disc that demands frequent use of the fast forward button."

David Dupont of One Final Note called the album "the album that would serve as an official proclamation of [Rudd's] return," and commented: "This is certainly not a set of sedate renderings of sentimental tunes. Rather it is a sprawling, messy recital grounded in Rudd's life... for all its sense of clutter, Broad Strokes remains an enduring, engaging addition to Rudd's discography."

Tom Hull called the album "a mishmash," and remarked: "Eclectic, it sez here. Big groups, small groups, too many vocals... some great trombone."

== Track listing ==
1. "Change of Season" (Herbie Nichols) – 7:09
2. "Sassy & Dolphy" (Roswell Rudd) – 6:19
3. "Almost Blue" (Elvis Costello) – 6:19
4. "Stokey" (Roswell Rudd) – 5:52
5. "Coming on the Hudson" (Thelonious Monk) – 8:47
6. "God Had a Girlfriend" (Roswell Rudd) – 6:35
7. "All Too Soon / Way Low" (Duke Ellington) – 8:50
8. "Theme from Babe" (Camille Saint-Saëns) – 5:20
9. "The Light" (Roswell Rudd) – 10:43
10. "Change of Season" (Herbie Nichols) – 1:28
- Tracks 1, 3, 4, 7, and 10 were recorded at Euphoria Studios in New York City on March 15, 1999. Track 2 was recorded at Nevessa Studio in Saugerties, New York, on July 24 and August 19, 1999. Track 5 was recorded at Ferber Studio A in Paris, France, on June 22, 1999. Track 6 was recorded at Nevessa Studio, in Saugerties, New York, on October 12, 1999. Track 8 was recorded at Sonic Youth Studio on January 7, 2000. Track 9 was recorded at Nevessa Studio in Saugerties, New York, on September 22, 1999.

== Personnel ==
- Roswell Rudd – trombone, maracas, narrator
- Ron Finck – alto saxophone, clarinet, flute (tracks 1, 4, 7, and 10)
- Harvey Kaiser – tenor saxophone, soprano saxophone, baritone saxophone, clarinet (tracks 1, 4, 7, and 10)
- Steve Lacy – soprano saxophone (track 5)
- Elton Dean – alto saxello (track 5)
- Greg Glassman – trumpet (track 6)
- Bobby Johnson Jr. – trumpet (track 6)
- Josh Roseman – trombone (tracks 1, 4, 7, and 10)
- Steve Swell – trombone (tracks 1, 4, 7, and 10)
- David Winograd – tuba (track 6)
- Mike Kull – piano (track 9)
- Duck Baker – acoustic guitar (track 2)
- Eddie Diehl – guitar (track 6)
- Matthew Finck – guitar (tracks 1, 4, 7, and 10)
- Jean-Jacques Avenel – bass (track 5)
- Ken Filiano – bass (tracks 1, 3, 4, 7, and 10)
- Alan Murphy – bass (track 6)
- Bill Dotts – bass (tracks 1, 3, 4, and 10)
- Eugene Randolph – drums (track 6)
- John Betsch – drums (track 5)
- Lou Grassi – drums (tracks 1, 3, 4, 7, and 10)
- Carlos Gomez – percussion (tracks 1, 4, 7, and 10)
- Christopher Rudd – voice (track 2)
- Sheila Jordan – voice (track 9)
- Steve Riddick – voice (track 4)
- MeeToo Quartet – voice (barkings) (track 6)
- Sonic Youth – ensemble (track 8)
