= August Love Song =

Studio album by Roswell Rudd and Heather Masse
- Released: 2016
- Recorded: 2016
- Studio: Nevessa Production, Woodstock, New York
- Genre: Jazz
- Length: 46:05
- Label: Red House; RHR CD 289
- Producer: Roswell Rudd, Heather Masse

Roswell Rudd chronology
Trombone for Lovers (2013)	August Love Song (2016)	Strength & Power (2016)

August Love Song is an album by trombonist Roswell Rudd and singer Heather Masse. It was recorded in 2016 at Nevessa Production in Woodstock, New York, and was released by Red House Records later that year. On the album, Rudd and Masse are joined by guitarist Rolf Sturm and bassist Mark Helias.

== Reception ==
Professional ratings
Review scores
Source	Rating
AllMusic	4/5 stars
All About Jazz	5/5 stars

In a review for AllMusic, Thom Jurek wrote: "Rudd draws on his love of Dixieland, pre-bop swing, and the influence of Kid Ory and Jack Teagarden. Masse... is possessed of a glorious, disciplined alto... Ultimately, the sincere desire for collaborative discovery by these players results in sheer delight for the listener."

All About Jazz reviewer C. Michael Bailey awarded the album a full 5 stars, calling it "as fine a recording as I believe I can bear," and stating: "this love story is one of music...ageless, constant, basic, organic. Both a sepia nostalgia and a fresh, post-modern veneer are evident in these ten well-crafted pieces. They are brilliant contradictions that perfectly complement one another."

Raul Da Gama commented: "Roswell Rudd and Heather Masse parley with the familiarity of old friends, yet their playing always retains the gracious etiquette associated with the classic ballroom academy for which the music was seemingly intended... Both are always sensitive to each other and each floats their exquisite long-limbed and exquisitely limpid lines exquisitely and effortlessly. Nothing is ever forced or exaggerated."

Writing for Jazz Times, Christopher Loudon stated: "With his distinctive punches and slurps, Rudd... provides a marvelously arresting counterpoint to Masse's dense, honeyed sound."

John Ziegler of the Duluth Reader remarked: "This teaming appears to be madness, except that being consummate pros, Heather Masse's incandescent vocal lines and Roswell Rudd's tailgating trombone intertwine like a couple of vipers making love and together create brilliant music... This is a recording created by skilled artists who simply want to share the joy of making superb music together."

Jazz Weekly's George H. Harris called the album "a winning mix of style and adventure," and wrote: "This disc caught me completely by surprise. Vocalist Heather Masse comes across like a classic swing era canary, mixing clarity and style like a Helen Forrest or Francis Wayne. Roswell Rudd comes from the left side of things, mixing growls, spurts and gurgles that came come in and go out to a variety of angles."

Tom Hull commented: "what I love is the trombone growl and rumble, but the others, not least the singer, do their part too."

== Track listing ==
1. "Social Call" (Jon Hendricks, Basheer Qusim) – 3:39
2. "Love Song for August" (Heather Masse) – 5:10
3. "I'm Goin' Sane (One Day at a Time)" (Verna Gillis) – 6:02
4. "Mood Indigo" (Barney Bigard, Duke Ellington, Irving Mills) – 4:48
5. "Winter Blues" (Roswell Rudd) – 4:13
6. "Blackstrap Molasses/Old Devil Moon" (Heather Masse / E.Y. "Yip" Harburg, Burton Lane) – 6:03
7. "Con Alma" (Dizzy Gillespie) – 4:14
8. "Open House" (Roswell Rudd) – 4:09
9. "Tova and Kyla Rain" (Verna Gillis) – 2:54
10. "Love Is Here to Stay" (George Gershwin, Ira Gershwin) – 4:54

== Personnel ==
- Roswell Rudd – trombone
- Heather Masse – vocals
- Rolf Sturm – guitar
- Mark Helias – bass
