= Monk's Dream =

Monk's Dream may refer to:

- Monk's Dream (Thelonious Monk album), 1963, or the title track
- Monk's Dream (Steve Lacy album), 2000
- Monk's Dreams: The Complete Compositions of Thelonious Sphere Monk, a 2018 box set by Frank Kimbrough
