= Embrace (Roswell Rudd, Fay Victor, Lafayette Harris, and Ken Filiano album) =

Studio album by Roswell Rudd, Fay Victor, Lafayette Harris, and Ken Filiano
- Released: 2017
- Studio: Potterville International Sound, Kingston, New York
- Genre: Jazz
- Length: 1:05:08
- Label: RareNoiseRecords; RNR085
- Producer: Verna Gillis

Roswell Rudd chronology
Strength & Power (2016)	Embrace (2017)	Roswell Rudd & Duck Baker: Live (2021)

Embrace is an album by trombonist Roswell Rudd, vocalist Fay Victor, pianist Lafayette Harris, and bassist Ken Filiano. It was recorded at Potterville International Sound in Kingston, New York, and was released by RareNoiseRecords in 2017.

Embrace, an album of jazz standards, was released several weeks before Rudd's death in December 2017, and marks his last recorded appearance.

== Reception ==
Professional ratings
Review scores
Source	Rating
DownBeat	4.5/5 stars
PopMatters	8/10 stars

In a review for DownBeat, Fred Bouchard wrote: "At 82, Rudd has been playing these compositions for ages, and his accumulated affection is tangible as barnacles. They're eclectic as Rudd, who embodies a rich confluence of jazz cultures. There are no polished charts, rather rough-cut barroom jams by solid pros exuding gritty experience and slow-smoked passion... Roswell here reminisces on his savory, crunchy career, showing us, with a bearhug, that it's been one swell ride."

Will Layman of PopMatters called the album "a tender, expressive, intimate date," and commented: "Embrace is one of the most delightful and fresh collections of 'jazz' standard performances I have heard in recent years. Each voice is wisened and wry, constitutionally incapable of singing or playing a cliche. If a band is going to take on songs we have often heard before, this is the way to do it: with a few formal innovations and a slew of feeling—both light and heavy."

Writing for Jazz Times, Dan Bilawsky stated: "Embrace is an album that reminds us that Roswell Rudd's slide carried the entire sweep of jazz history in its movements. But it also affirms the very notion of this music as a form of collaborative high art."

Tom Hull included the recording in his list of "best jazz albums of 2017," and remarked: "The trombone isn't exactly lovely, but so full of soul it can't be the work of anyone else."

Point of Departure's John Litweiler noted that Rudd "improvises in a grand manner in the faster pieces, and he really sounds like he's the 21st-century heir to the great swing-era trombone expressionists," whereas in the slower pieces, "even in broken phrases, his quest for melody yields tension."

Raul Da Gama wrote: "This is a glorious disc. Simply glorious. It features Roswell Rudd in a wide, joyous and complete Embrace of life and features beautifully crafted arrangements of beguiling variety and sensuousness, in every caressed phrase. Clearly Roswell Rudd's love for life and music shines brightly."

== Track listing ==
1. "Something to Live For" (Billy Strayhorn, Duke Ellington) – 8:22
2. "Goodbye Pork Pie Hat" (Charles Mingus, Rahsaan Roland Kirk) – 6:39
3. "Can't We Be Friends?" (Paul James, Kay Swift) – 7:46
4. "I Hadn't Anyone Till You" (Ray Noble) – 7:20
5. "Too Late Now" (Burton Lane) – 11:34
6. "The House of the Rising Sun" (Traditional) – 8:17
7. "I Look in the Mirror" (Verna Gillis) – 4:38
8. "Pannonica" (Thelonious Monk, Joe Hendricks) – 10:32

== Personnel ==
- Roswell Rudd – trombone
- Fay Victor – voice
- Lafayette Harris – piano
- Ken Filiano – bass
