= Regeneration (Roswell Rudd album) =

Studio album by Roswell Rudd
- Released: 1983
- Recorded: June 25–26, 1982
- Studios: Barigozzi Studio, Milan, Italy
- Genre: Jazz
- Length: 40:25
- Labels: Soul Note; SN 1054
- Producer: Giovanni Bonandrini

Roswell Rudd chronology
The Definitive Roswell Rudd (1979)	Regeneration (1983)	The Unheard Herbie Nichols, Vol. 1 (1997)

Regeneration is an album by trombonist Roswell Rudd. It was recorded in June 1982 at Barigozzi Studio in Milan, Italy, and was released by Soul Note in 1983. On the album, which features compositions by Herbie Nichols and Thelonious Monk, Rudd is joined by saxophonist Steve Lacy, pianist Misha Mengelberg, bassist Kent Carter, and drummer Han Bennink.

Rudd would go on to record additional music by Nichols on The Unheard Herbie Nichols (1997), released in two volumes.

== Reception ==
Professional ratings
Review scores
Source	Rating
AllMusic	4.5/5 stars
The Penguin Guide to Jazz	3.5/4 stars

In a review for AllMusic, Scott Yanow wrote: "a noteworthy group... The musicians very much understood the composers' purposes, and... they come up with definitive treatments. Highly recommended."

The authors of The Penguin Guide to Jazz awarded the album 3½ stars, and commented: "Regeneration is very satisfying... it's a tribute to the pianist and composer with whom Rudd worked in the early '60s... Lacy and Rudd used to work together in a unit which performed only Thelonious Monk material, so it's no surprise to hear three Monk tunes here alongside the same number of Nichols pieces."

== Track listing ==
1. "Blue Chopsticks" (Herbie Nichols) – 6:17
2. "2300 Skiddoo" (Herbie Nichols) – 8:15
3. "Twelve Bars" (Herbie Nichols) – 4:25
4. "Monk's Mood" (Thelonious Monk) – 8:09
5. "Friday The 13th" (Thelonious Monk) – 9:11
6. "Epistrophy" (Thelonious Monk) – 4:08

== Personnel ==
- Roswell Rudd – trombone
- Steve Lacy – soprano saxophone
- Misha Mengelberg – piano
- Kent Carter – bass
- Han Bennink – drums
