= Al McKibbon =

American jazz double bassist (1919–2005)

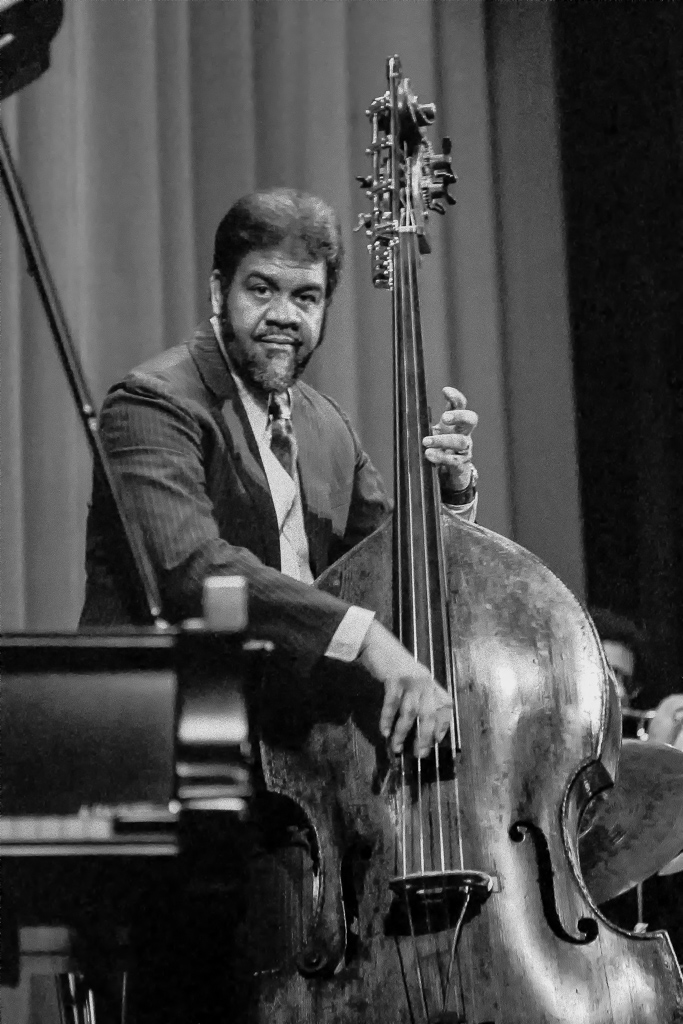
- McKibbon in 1971

Background information
- Born: Alfred Benjamin McKibbon; January 1, 1919
- Died: July 29, 2005 (aged 86)
- Genres: Jazz; bebop; hardbop; Latin jazz
- Occupation: Musician
- Instrument: Double bass
- Years active: mid-1940s–2004
- Labels: Blue Lady; Departure

Alfred Benjamin McKibbon (January 1, 1919 – July 29, 2005) was an American jazz double bassist, known for his work in bebop, hard bop, and Latin jazz.

In 1947, after working with Lucky Millinder, Tab Smith, J. C. Heard, and Coleman Hawkins, he replaced Ray Brown in Dizzy Gillespie's band, in which he played until 1950. In the 1950s, he recorded with the Miles Davis nonet, Earl Hines, Count Basie, Johnny Hodges, Thelonious Monk, Mongo Santamaría, George Shearing, Cal Tjader, Herbie Nichols, and Hawkins. McKibbon was credited with interesting Tjader in Latin music while he played in Shearing's group.

In 1999, he released the first album under his own name, Tumbao Para Los Congueros De Mi Vida. McKibbon's second album, Black Orchid, was released in 2004.

== Discography ==
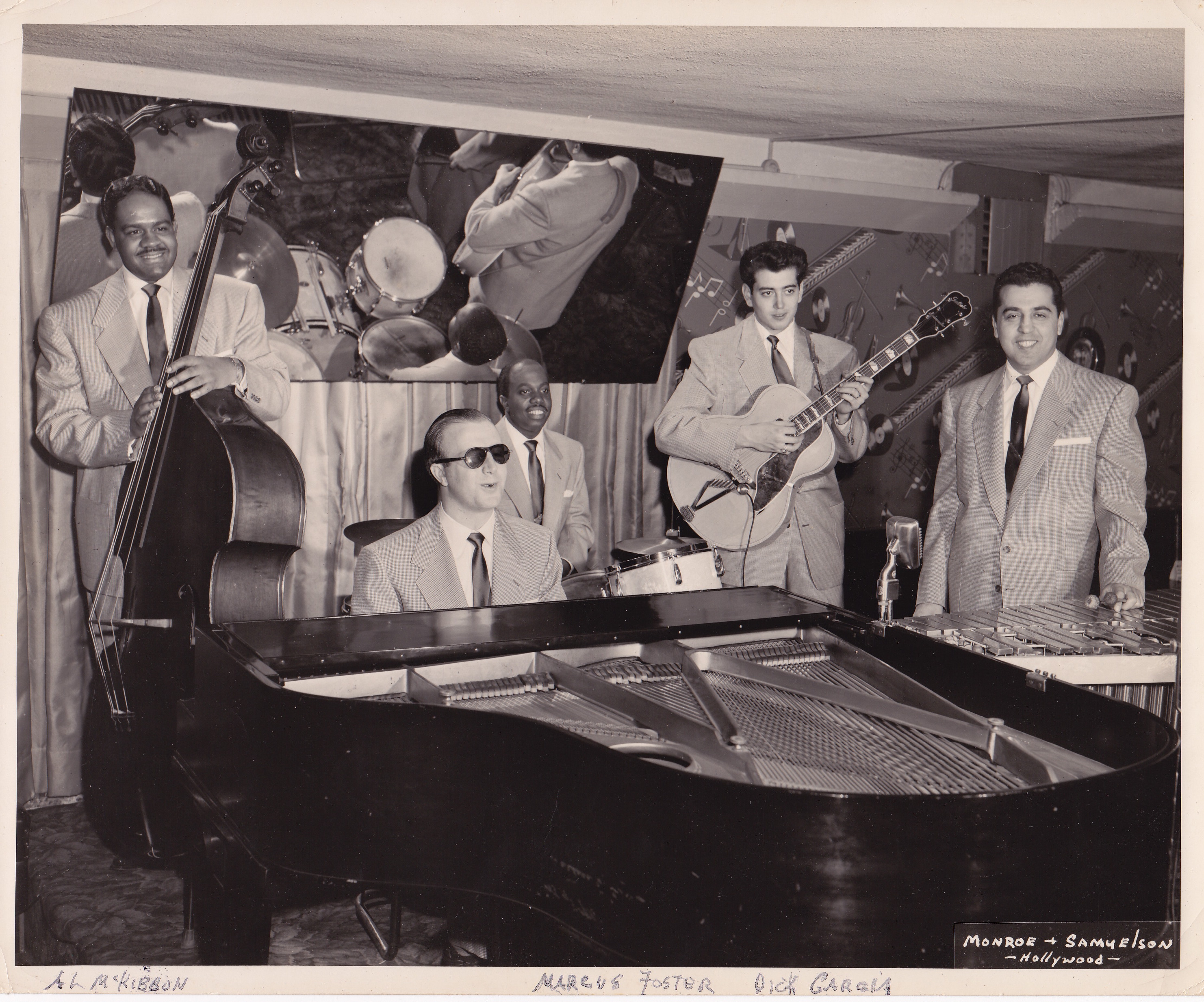
George Shearing's band, including (from left), McKibbon, Shearing, Marcus Foster, Dick Garcia, and Joe Roland

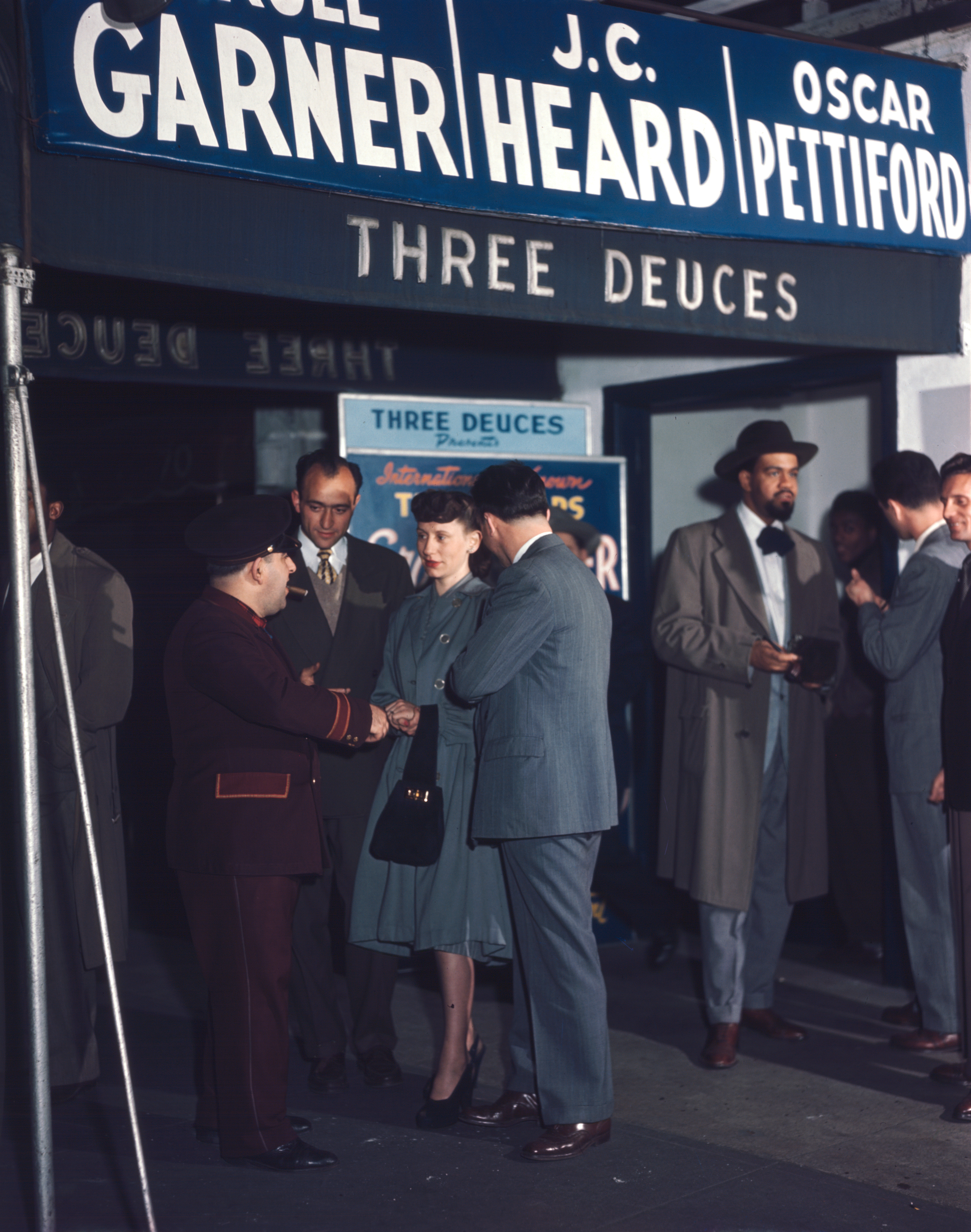
McKibbon (right, wearing hat) outside the Three Deuces jazz club, New York, 1948

=== As leader ===
- Tumbao Para Los Congueros De Mi Vida (Blue Lady, 1999)
- Black Orchid (Departure, 2004)

=== As sideman ===
With Nat Adderley

- To the Ivy League from Nat (EmArcy, 1956)

With Lorez Alexandria

- Alexandria the Great (Impulse!, 1964)
- More of the Great Lorez Alexandria (Impulse!, 1964)

With The Byrds

- The Notorious Byrd Brothers (Columbia, 1968)

With Nat King Cole

- Nat King Cole Sings/George Shearing Plays (Capitol, 1962)

With Sonny Criss

- Sonny's Dream (Birth of the New Cool) (Prestige, 1968)

With Miles Davis

- Birth of the Cool (Capitol, 1957)

With Victor Feldman

- Latinsville! (Contemporary, 1960)

With Dizzy Gillespie

- Carter, Gillespie Inc. (Pablo, 1976) with Benny Carter
- The Complete RCA Victor Recordings (Bluebird, 1995)

With Coleman Hawkins

- The Coleman Hawkins, Roy Eldridge, Pete Brown, Jo Jones All Stars at Newport (Verve, 1957)

With Johnny Hodges

- Castle Rock (Norgran, 1955)

With The Jazz Crusaders

- Chile Con Soul (Pacific Jazz, 1965)

With Charles Kynard and Buddy Collette

- Warm Winds (World Pacific, 1964)

With Thelonious Monk

- Genius of Modern Music: Volume 2 (Blue Note, 1955)
- The Giants of Jazz (Atlantic, 1971) with Art Blakey, Dizzy Gillespie, Sonny Stitt, and Kai Winding
- The London Sessions (Black Lion, 1971) with Art Blakey

With Randy Newman

- 12 Songs (Reprise, 1970)

With The Night Blooming Jazzmen

- The Night Blooming Jazzmen (1971)

With Herbie Nichols

- The Prophetic Herbie Nichols Vol. 1 (Blue Note, 1955)
- The Prophetic Herbie Nichols Vol. 2 (Blue Note, 1955)
- Herbie Nichols Trio (Blue Note, 1956)

With Shuggie Otis

- Here Comes Shuggie Otis (Epic, 1969)

With Van Dyke Parks

- Discover America (Warner Bros., 1972)

With Freddie Redd

- Live at the Studio Grill (Triloka, 1990)

With Martha Reeves

- We Meet Again (Fantasy, 1978)

With George Shearing

- Latin Escapade (1956)
- On the Sunny Side of the Strip (Capitol, 1960)

With George Shearing and Dakota Staton

- In the Night (Capitol, 1958)

With Frank Sinatra

- Sinatra and Swingin' Brass (Reprise, 1962)

With Robert Stewart

- The Movement (Exodus, 2002)

With Billy Taylor

- Piano Panorama (Atlantic, 1952)

With Cal Tjader

- Cal Tjader, Vibist (Savoy, 1954)
- Cal Tjader Plays Afro-Cuban (Fantasy, 1955)
- Ritmo Caliente! (Fantasy, 1956)
- Tjader Plays Tjazz (Fantasy, 1956)
- Mas Ritmo Caliente (Fantasy, 1957)
- Latin for Lovers (Fantasy, 1958)
- Cal Tjader's Latin Concert (Fantasy, 1958)
- A Night at the Blackhawk (Fantasy, 1958)
- Cal Tjader Goes Latin (Fantasy, 1959)
- Cal Tjader's Concert by the Sea (Fantasy, 1959)
- Cal Tjader's Concert by the Sea, Vol. 2 (Fantasy, 1959)
- Demasiado Caliente (Fantasy, 1960)
- Cal Tjader Plays Harold Arlen (Fantasy, 1960)
- In a Latin Bag (Verve, 1961)
- Live at the Monterey Jazz Festival 1958–1980 (Concord, 2008)

With Mel Tormé

- Right Now! (Columbia, 1966)

With Jack Wilson

- The Jack Wilson Quartet featuring Roy Ayers (Atlantic, 1963)
