= Blue Mongol =

Studio album by Roswell Rudd and The Mongolian Buryat Band
- Released: 2005
- Recorded: October 11, 2005
- Studio: Nevessa Production, Saugerties, New York
- Genre: Jazz, World music
- Length: 1:04:44
- Label: Sunnyside; SSC1147
- Producer: Roswell Rudd, Verna Gillis

Roswell Rudd chronology
Malicool (2002)	Blue Mongol (2005)	Airwalkers (2006)

Blue Mongol is an album by trombonist Roswell Rudd and the Mongolian Buryat Band, a five-member ensemble led by Mongolian vocalist Badma Khanda, featuring horse-head fiddle and bass, instruments resembling zither, dulcimer, and flute, and a throat singer. It was recorded in 2005 at Nevessa Production in Saugerties, New York, and was released by Sunnyside Records later that year. The album is a continuation of the cross-cultural experiments that Rudd began pursuing with 2002's Malicool.

Rudd and the Mongolian Buryat Band toured the United States in late 2006. He reflected: "Listeners will be reminded of American folk music and aspects of the blues... I call their music 'art folk' because it combines the sophistication of conservatory training with the indigenous performance style of their long history."

== Reception ==
Professional ratings
Review scores
Source	Rating
AllMusic	4.5/5 stars
All About Jazz	3.5/5 stars
The Penguin Guide to Jazz	3/4 stars

In a review for AllMusic, Thom Jurek wrote: "Wow! Simply put, this recording is almost indescribable... There isn't another recording like this on the planet; it's stunning."

The Village Voice's Francis Davis stated: "Twinning with Khanda, matching the throat singer's gargle with growled multiphonics, or just floating over the strings, Rudd throws himself into everything with such relish you might be hard-pressed to tell which tunes are traditional and which are his without glancing at the credits. The Buryats meet him halfway, occasionally recalling Django or country swing, even boogie-woogie... East is East, and West is West, and wherever the four winds blow—that's not just a quote, it's his philosophy."

Writing for All About Jazz, John Kelman remarked: "Blue Mongol, with its greater elegance and emotional depth, requires more inherent sensitivity than the upbeat MALIcool, making it a riskier proposition. And while it has a few disconnected moments, it succeeds more often than not, making it a worthwhile listen for those who believe music to be the voice that speaks to all cultures."

Tom Hull commented: "The great jazz trombonist engages a conservatory-trained Mongolian folk group; part of the interest is the similar harmonics between trombone and throat singing, but the highlight is when Rudd cops a Beach Boys line for 'Buryat Boogie'."

== Track listing ==
1. "The Camel" (Traditional, arranged by Battuvshin Baldantseren, Roswell Rudd) – 4:21
2. "Gathering Light" (Roswell Rudd) – 5:27
3. "Behind the Mountains" (Traditional) – 2:56
4. "Steppes Song" (Traditional) – 4:04
5. "Djoloren" (Oumou Sangaré) – 8:38
6. "Four Mountains" (Battuvshin Baldantseren, Roswell Rudd) – 5:35
7. "Buryat Boogie" (Roswell Rudd) – 5:38
8. "Blue Mongol" (Roswell Rudd) – 5:19
9. "Bridle Ringing" (Traditional) – 2:41
10. "Ulirenge" (Traditional, arranged by Badma Khanda, Kermen Kalyaeva) – 4:59
11. "American Round (Swing Low, Sweet Chariot / Comin' In on a Wing and a Prayer / Amazing Grace)" (Arranged by Battuvshin Baldantseren, Roswell Rudd) – 3:15
12. "The Leopard" (Traditional) – 5:02
13. "Honey on the Moon" (Roswell Rudd) – 6:49

== Personnel ==
- Roswell Rudd – trombone, mellophone, vocals
- Battuvshin Baldantseren – throat singer, limbe (flute), ikh khur (horse head bass), khomus (jaw's harp)
- Badma Khanda – vocals
- Dmitry Ayurov – morin khur (horse head fiddle)
- Kermen Kalyaeva – lochin (dulcimer), khalmyk dombra (lute)
- Valentina Namdykova – yatag (zither)
