= Airwalkers =

Studio album by Roswell Rudd and Mark Dresser
- Released: 2006
- Recorded: August 4, 2004
- Studio: Nevessa Studio, Saugerties, New York
- Genre: Jazz
- Label: Clean Feed; CF066CD
- Producer: Mark Dresser, Roswell Rudd

Roswell Rudd chronology
Blue Mongol (2005)	Airwalkers (2006)	El Espíritu Jíbaro (2007)

Airwalkers is an album by trombonist Roswell Rudd and bassist Mark Dresser. It was recorded in August 2004 at Nevessa Studio in Saugerties, New York, and was released by Clean Feed Records in 2006.

According to Rudd, only two songs ("Airwalkers" and "Roz MD") were prepared for the recording session. The remaining tracks "happened exactly like a musical hang in the apt."

== Reception ==
Professional ratings
Review scores
Source	Rating
AllMusic	4/5 stars
The Penguin Guide to Jazz	3.5/4 stars
All About Jazz	4/5 stars
The Christian Science Monitor	B+

In a review for AllMusic, Ken Dryden wrote: "While duo recordings are hardly rare in jazz, it is hard to think of many trombone-bass meetings. But Roswell Rudd and Mark Dresser are two veterans who are up to the challenge of keeping things interesting... This delightful meeting between two virtuosos will satisfy any jazz fan with open ears."

The authors of the Penguin Guide to Jazz Recordings stated: "Dresser's slightly formal approach suits the setting well, with Rudd seeming to touch on a range of 'world' music styles... It might sound a demanding listen, but there is nothing here that isn't immediately involving."

Writing for All About Jazz, Troy Collins described the duo as "a sympathetic and adventurous pair," and commented: "The eclectic program provides a telling snapshot of two masterful improvisers dialoguing in a casual, uncluttered setting. The chimerical combination of Dresser's avant-classicism and Rudd's earthy expressionism make an atypical, but apposite pair. For those interested in adventurous, conversational gamesmanship, Airwalkers is an intimate portrait of two masters at work."

In an article for The Christian Science Monitor, Norman Weinstein stated: "What happens when a blisteringly eclectic trombonist and dramatically versatile bassist improvise on traditional forms such as the waltz or calypso? The result is a fearless and often giddying adventure into the far reaches of how each instrument can surprisingly sound as they dance about each other gleefully."

The Village Voice's Francis Davis wrote: "With Dresser snapping strings against wood until it creaks and Rudd blowing so hard you can hear the metal in his horn resonate, the freely improvised duets on Airwalkers are elemental, but not strictly—there's also plenty of in-tempo walking and wailing, and it inevitably comes across as something both players were planning all along, never a momentary respite from all the sonic hijinks."

== Track listings ==
1. "Calypso Lite" (Rudd/Dresser) – 5:49
2. "Airwalkers (Take Two)" (Rudd) – 9:46
3. "Pregnant Pauses" (Rudd/Dresser) – 3:42
4. "Roz MD" (Dresser) – 10:23
5. "Duality" (Rudd/Dresser) – 4:55
6. "Burst" (Rudd/Dresser) – 1:36
7. "Don't Blame Me" (Jimmy McHugh, Dorothy Fields) – 7:24
8. "Lovers Waltz" (Rudd/Dresser) – 3:25
9. "Airwalkers (Take One)" (Rudd) – 11:58

== Personnel ==
- Roswell Rudd – trombone
- Mark Dresser – double bass
