= Too Close for Comfort (song) =

1956 song

Single by Sammy Davis Jr.

from the album Mr. Wonderful
- B-side: "Jacques D'Iraque"
- Released: March 3, 1956
- Genre: traditional pop
- Label: Decca
- Songwriters: Jerry Bock, George David Weiss, Larry Holofcener

"Too Close for Comfort" is a popular song by Jerry Bock, George David Weiss, and Larry Holofcener.

It was written in 1956 as part of the score for the Broadway musical Mr. Wonderful starring Sammy Davis Jr., who released the song as a single on March 3, 1956 on Decca Records prior to the musical's premiere. Several other pop vocalists, such as Eileen Barton, also recorded their own competing versions around this time, as well as other songs from the musical.

== Notable versions ==
Sample of "Too Close for Comfort" by Eydie Gormé

- Eydie Gormé – the single charted at No. 39 in the U.S. (1956) and was included on her album Eydie Gormé (1957)
- A memorable 1956 duet of the song featured Ella Fitzgerald and Joe Williams, although the 1958 recordings by Sammy Davis Jr. and Frank Sinatra (from his album Come Dance With Me!) are the best-known versions of the song.
- Stan Getz – The Steamer (1956)
- Johnny Mathis – Wonderful, Wonderful (1957)
- Herbie Nichols – Love, Gloom, Cash, Love (Bethlehem BCP81 1958)
- Harry James – Harry James and His New Swingin' Band (MGM SE-3778, 1959)
- Plas Johnson – This Must Be the Plas (1959)
- Marty Paich – The Broadway Bit (Warner Bros. Records, 1959)
- Peggy Lee – Pretty Eyes (1960)
- Art Pepper – Intensity (1960)
- Mel Tormé – Swings Shubert Alley (1960)
- Les McCann – Les McCann Ltd. Plays the Shampoo (1961)
- Sammy Davis Jr. – Sammy Davis Jr. Belts the Best of Broadway (1962)
- Natalie Cole – Take a Look (1993)
- Christian McBride – Gettin' to It (1995)
- Jamie Cullum – Pointless Nostalgic (2002)
- Dianne Reeves for the Grammy Award-winning soundtrack to Good Night, and Good Luck (2005)
- Gordon Goodwin's Big Phat Band, featuring Dianne Reeves – The Phat Pack (2006)

== In popular culture ==
- Peggy Taylor in an episode of the TV series Peter Gunn (1960)
