= Fay Victor =

American songwriter

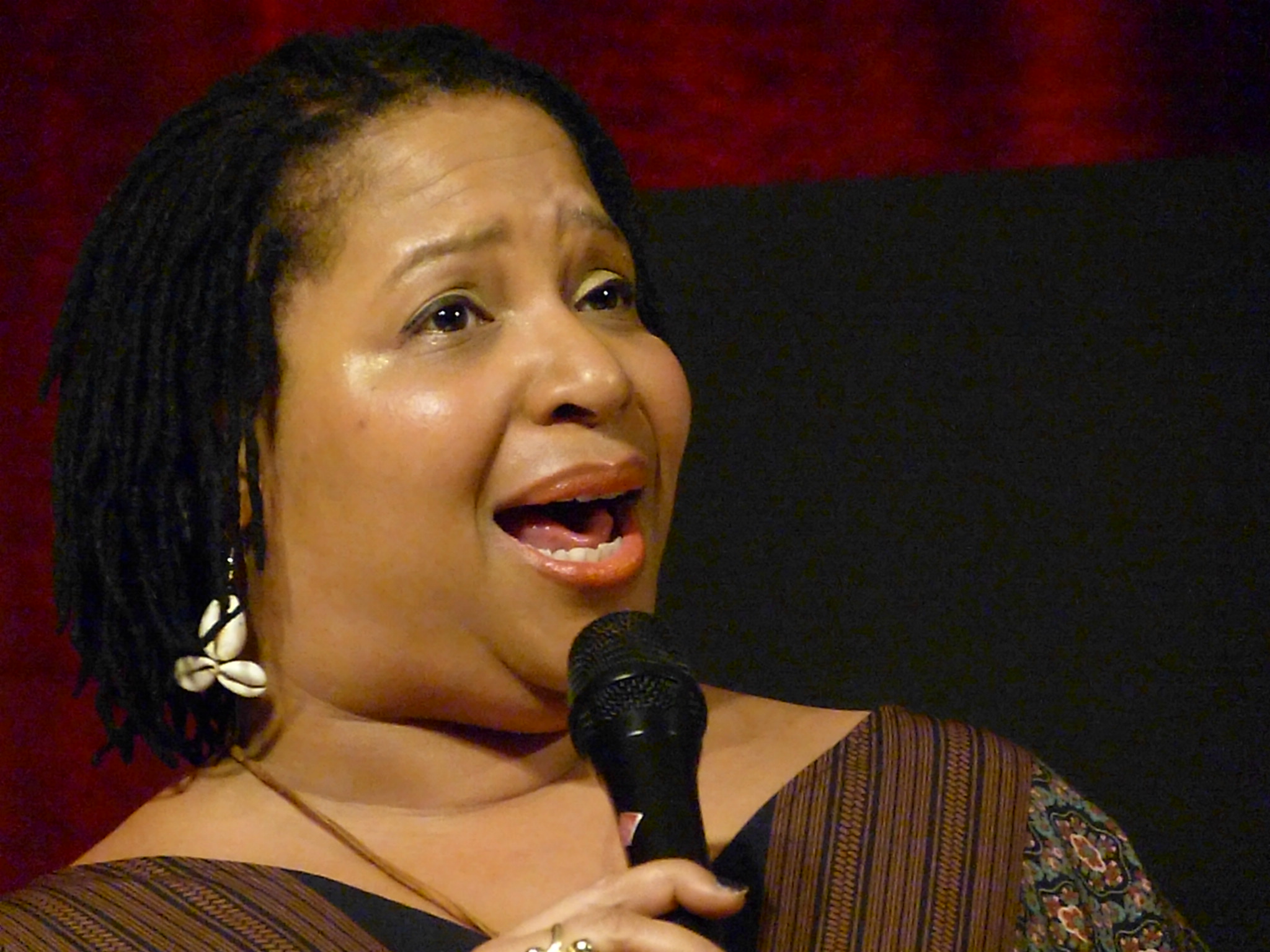
- Victor performing in 2016 in Cologne, Germany

Background information
- Born: July 26, 1965 (age 60); Manhattan, New York City, United States
- Occupations: Musician, composer, lyricist
- Labels: Tao Forms, Northern Spy, ESP Disk, Greene Ave Music, Timeless Records, Freeze records, ArtistShare
- Website: fayvictor.com

Fay Victor (born July 26, 1965) is an American musician, composer, lyricist and educator. Originally a singer in the traditional jazz field, she has been working in jazz, blues, opera, free improvising, avant-garde, modern classical music, and occasional acting since re-settling in New York in 2003.

== Early life and career ==
Victor was born in Manhattan, New York City. After spending her early childhood years in New York, Zambia, and Trinidad & Tobago, Victor spent her teenage years in Long Island, NY. After her mother's sudden death, Victor re-discovered music and singing, which led to the minor Billboard charted club hit "You Make Me Happy" released in 1992 and remixed by Todd Terry in 1993. After a 3-month stint at a club in Fukui City, Japan with pianist Bertha Hope, she decided to start a career as a jazz singer. In 1996, Victor settled in Amsterdam, the Netherlands and performed and toured through the Netherlands, Spain, Germany, the UK, Sweden, Russia, and India. While living in the Netherlands, Victor branched out into blues, songwriting, and forms of improvising outside the standard jazz canon. Victor moved back to New York City in 2003, and in 2023 settled in the Western Catskills region of New York State. She has worked with the likes of Randy Weston, Roswell Rudd, Anthony Braxton, Misha Mengelberg, Vijay Iyer, Tyshawn Sorey, Wadada Leo Smith, Nicole Mitchell, Marc Ribot, Martine Syms, Daniel Carter, William Parker, Darius Jones, Wolter Wierbos, Ab Baars, Joe Morris, Sam Newsome, and Reggie Nicholson.

Victor's work has been reviewed in The New York Times, Jazz Times, and Down Beat.

== Music ==
Victor has coined the term "freesong" to describe her vocal approach. In her jazz repertoire, Victor has specialized in the work of Thelonious Monk, Ornette Coleman and Herbie Nichols. She has been a member of the International Contemporary Ensemble since 2021.

=== Leadership and Activism ===
Victor has since its inception chaired the Advisory Board for the Jazz Leaders Fellowship via the Brooklyn Conservatory of Music, an initiative to fund and support black female and non-binary jazz artists. Victor was co-director of the TalkRace forum and is a member of the "We Have Voice" collective.

=== Awards and recognition ===
As a composer, Victor has been awarded the 2017 Herb Albert/Yaddo Fellow in Music Composition, and a 2018 AIR in Composition for the Headlands Center for the Arts in the Marine Headlands in Northern California. In 2025, she received a George Wein TJG Fellowship.

=== Publications ===
In 2021, Victor published a chapter in John Zorn's series of new music theory Arcana X: Musicians on Music.

=== Educator ===
Victor has been Adjunct Music Faculty at The New School School of Jazz and Contemporary Music since 2019. In the Spring of 2025, she was a Visiting Professor at the Harvard University Music Department. She has given masterclasses at institutions such as the Guildhall School of Music, Lawrence University and University of California, San Diego.

== Discography ==
=== As leader/co-leader ===
Title	Artist	Year	Label
Life Is Funny That Way	Fay Victor's Herbie Nichols SUNG	2024	TAO Forms
Blackity Black Black is Beautiful	Fay Victor	2023	Northern Spy Records
We've Had Enough!	Fay Victor's SoundNoiseFUNK	2020	ESP Disk
Barn Songs	Fay Victor	2019	Northern Spy
In My Own Room	Fay Victor	1998	Timeless Records
Darker Than Blue	Fay Victor	2001	Timeless Records
Should We Do This Again?	Fay Victor	1995	Groovie Sound
Lazy Old Sun	Fay Victor	2004	Greene Ave Music
Wet Robots	Fay Victor's SoundNoiseFUNK	2018	ESP Disk
Kaiso Stories	Other Dimensions In Music with Fay Victor	2010	Silkheart
Absinthe & Vermouth	Fay Victor Ensemble	2013	Greene Ave Music
The FreeSong Suite	Fay Victor Ensemble	2009	Greene Ave Music
Cartwheels Through The Cosmos	Fay Victor Ensemble	2007	ArtistShare
Bare	The Exposed Blues Duo (with Anders Nilsson)	2010	Greene Ave Music
New York/Sankt Johann	ReDDeer (with Elisabeth Harnik & Dominic Lash)	2017	Evil Rabbit

=== As featured artist/collaborator ===
Title	Artist	Year	Label
West Coast Blues	Gregor Hilden	1998	Acoustic Music Records
Aces of Swing: A Tribute to the Music of John Kirby & Charlie Shavers	Robert Veen Sextet	1996	Basta Basta
Trombone for Lovers	Roswell Rudd	2013	Sunnyside
Embrace	Roswell Rudd	2017	Rare Noise Records
The Invisible Blow	Ab Baars Trio + NY guests	2014	Stichting Wig
Trillium E	Anthony Braxton	2011	New Braxton House
Glorious Ravage	Liza Mezzacappa	2017	New World Records
The Jazz Lounge Trio Meets...	Jazz Lounge Trio	2000	Laika Records
Songs of Resistance - 1942-2018	Marc Ribot	2018	Anti records
Overcome	Dave Douglas	2022	Greenleaf Music
maroon cloud	Nicole Mitchell's Maroon Cloud	2018	Nicole Mitchell Bandcamp
Purposing The Air	Ingrid Laubrock	2025	Pyroclastic Records
Miniature America	Miles Okazaki	2024	Cygnus Recordings
Migration of Silence Into and Out of The Tone World - Volumes 1–10	William Parker	2021	AUM Fidelity
