= Easterly Winds =

Studio album by Jack Wilson
- Released: Early February 1968
- Recorded: September 22, 1967
- Studio: Van Gelder Studio, Englewood Cliffs, NJ
- Genre: Jazz
- Length: 38:05
- Label: Blue Note; BST 84270
- Producer: Duke Pearson

Jack Wilson chronology
| Something Personal (1966) | Easterly Winds (1968) | Song for My Daughter (1968) |

Easterly Winds is a 1968 album by American jazz pianist Jack Wilson featuring performances recorded in 1967 and released on the Blue Note label.

== Reception ==
The Allmusic review by Stephen Thomas Erlewine awarded the album 4 stars and stated "Easterly Winds provides an excellent contrast to Jack Wilson's first Blue Note album, Something Personal. Where his label debut was cool and romantic, Easterly Winds is a brassy, funky collection of soul-jazz and hard bop with instant appeal... It's another impressive, enjoyable effort from one of the most underrated pianists on Blue Note's '60s roster".

Professional ratings
Review scores
| Source | Rating |
|---|---|
| Allmusic | 4/5 stars |
| Tom Hull | B |

== Track listing ==
All compositions by Jack Wilson except as noted

1. "Do It" - 6:25
2. "On Children" - 5:25
3. "A Time for Love" (Johnny Mandel) - 5:46
4. "Easterly Winds" - 5:55
5. "Nirvanna" - 6:34
6. "Frank's Tune" (Frank Strozier) - 8:00

== Personnel ==
- Jack Wilson - piano
- Lee Morgan - trumpet (tracks 1, 2 & 4–6)
- Garnett Brown - trombone (tracks 1, 2 & 4–6)
- Jackie McLean - alto saxophone (tracks 1, 2 & 4–6)
- Bob Cranshaw - bass
- Billy Higgins - drums
