= The Prophetic Herbie Nichols =

- Vol. 1

Studio album by the Prophetic Herbie Nichols
- Released: 1955
- Recorded: May 6, 1955 (Vol. 1); May 13, 1955 (Vol. 2)
- Studio: Van Gelder Studio; Hackensack, New Jersey
- Genre: Jazz
- Length: 26:43 (Vol. 1); 28:30 (Vol. 2)
- Label: Blue Note; BLP 5068 (Vol. 1); BLP 5069 (Vol. 2)
- Producer: Alfred Lion

Herbie Nichols chronology
The Prophetic Herbie Nichols (1955)	Herbie Nichols Trio (1956)

The Prophetic Herbie Nichols
- Vol. 2

The Prophetic Herbie Nichols, Vols. 1 & 2 are a pair of separate but related ten-inch LPs by jazz pianist Herbie Nichols recorded on May 6 & 13, 1955 respectively and released on Blue Note later that year.

== Reception ==
Although originally unheralded at the time of release Nichols' Blue Note recordings have gained recognition as highly original and ground-breaking compositions and performances. The AllMusic review by Scott Yanow awarded Nichols' The Complete Blue Note Recordings, released in 1997, a five star rating and stated "The music is virtually unclassifiable, and although largely straight-ahead, sounds unlike anything produced by Herbie Nichols' contemporaries. Essential music."

Professional ratings
Review scores
Source	Rating
AllMusic	5/5 stars

== Track listing ==
=== The Prophetic Herbie Nichols, Vol. 1 ===
All compositions by Herbie Nichols

==== Side 1 ====
1. "Dance Line" – 4:24
2. "Step Tempest" – 5:08
3. "The Third World" – 4:08

==== Side 2 ====
1. "Blue Chopsticks" – 4:20
2. "Double Exposure" – 4:04
3. "Cro-Magnon Nights" – 4:39

=== The Prophetic Herbie Nichols, Vol. 2 ===
All compositions by Herbie Nichols

==== Side 1 ====
1. "Amoeba's Dance" – 4:29
2. "Crisp Day" – 3:43
3. "2300 Skiddoo" – 4:29

==== Side 2 ====
1. "It Didn't Happen" – 5:10
2. "Shuffle Montgomery" – 5:11
3. "Brass Rings" – 5:28

== Personnel ==
=== Musicians ===
- Herbie Nichols – piano
- Al McKibbon – bass
- Art Blakey – drums

=== Technical personnel ===
- Alfred Lion – producer (uncredited)
- Rudy Van Gelder – recording engineer
- Martin Craig – design
- Leonard Feather – liner notes
