= The Jack Wilson Quartet featuring Roy Ayers =

Studio album by Jack Wilson
- Released: 1963
- Recorded: February 6, 1963; Los Angeles, CA
- Genre: Jazz
- Length: 35:10
- Label: Atlantic; SD 1406
- Producer: Nesuhi Ertegun

Jack Wilson chronology
The Jack Wilson Quartet featuring Roy Ayers (1963)	The Two Sides of Jack Wilson (1964)

The Jack Wilson Quartet featuring Roy Ayers is an album by American jazz pianist Jack Wilson recorded for the Atlantic label and released in 1963.

== Reception ==
Professional ratings
Review scores
Source	Rating
AllMusic	3/5 stars

AllMusic awarded the album 3 stars.

== Track listing ==
All compositions by Jack Wilson except as indicated

1. "Corcovado" (Antônio Carlos Jobim) - 4:41
2. "Jackleg" - 2:29
3. "Blues We Use" - 6:24
4. "Harbor Freeway" - 2:55
5. "De Critifeux" - 5:56
6. "Nirvana & Dana" - 12:46

== Personnel ==
- Jack Wilson - piano
- Roy Ayers - vibraphone
- Al McKibbon - bass
- Nick Martinis - drums
