= Something Personal =

Studio album by Jack Wilson
- Released: August 1967
- Recorded: August 9–10, 1966; Annex Studios, Los Angeles
- Genre: Jazz
- Length: 40:07 original LP; 44:58 CD reissue
- Label: Blue Note; BST 84251
- Producer: Jack Tracy

Jack Wilson chronology
Ramblin' (1966)	Something Personal (1967)	Easterly Winds (1967)

Something Personal is an album by American jazz pianist Jack Wilson featuring performances recorded and released on the Blue Note label in 1967.

== Reception ==
The Allmusic review by Scott Yanow awarded the album 4½ stars and stated "this album is an excellent showcase for the often-overlooked Jack Wilson".

Professional ratings
Review scores
Source	Rating
Allmusic	4.5/5 stars

== Track listing ==
All compositions by Jack Wilson except as indicated

1. "Most Unsoulful Woman" - 6:53
2. "The Sphinx" (Ornette Coleman) - 5:07
3. "Shosh" - (Blues in F) 8:59
4. "Serenata" (Leroy Anderson) - 6:58
5. "Harbor Freeway 5 P.M." - 7:12
6. "C.F.D." - 4:58
7. "One and Four" [aka. "Mr. Day"] (John Coltrane) - 4:51 Bonus track on CD reissue

Recorded on August 9 (4, 6–7) and August 10 (1–3, 5), 1966.

== Personnel ==
- Jack Wilson - piano
- Roy Ayers - vibes
- Ray Brown - bass (#3–6), cello (#1–2)
- Charles 'Buster' Williams - bass (#1–2)
- Varney Barlow - drums
