= Jack Wilson (jazz pianist) =

American jazz pianist and composer

Background information
- Born: August 3, 1936; Chicago, Illinois, U.S.
- Died: October 5, 2007 (aged 71)
- Genres: Jazz
- Occupations: Musician, composer
- Instrument: Piano
- Labels: Atlantic, Blue Note, Discovery

Jack Wilson (August 3, 1936 – October 5, 2007) was an American jazz pianist and composer.

== Biography ==
=== Early life ===
Wilson was born in Chicago on August 3, 1936, moving to Fort Wayne, Indiana at age seven. From 1949 to 1954, he studied piano with Carl Atkinson at the Fort Wayne College of Music. It was during this time that he was introduced to the music of George Shearing.

Later picking up tenor saxophone, Wilson played in the Central High School band and began performing locally as a leader of small combos. By his fifteenth birthday, he had become the youngest member ever to join the Fort Wayne Musicians Union (Local 58). At the age of 17 he played a two-week stint as a substitute pianist in James Moody's band.

After graduating from Central High, Wilson spent a year-and-a-half at Indiana University, encountering Freddie Hubbard and Slide Hampton. Touring with a rock 'n' roll band, he wound up in Columbus, Ohio, connecting with the then unknown Nancy Wilson and Rahsaan Roland Kirk.

=== Professional musician ===
After a year in Columbus, Wilson moved to Atlantic City, leading the house band at the Cotton Club, now adding organ to his musical arsenal. At the Club he encountered Dinah Washington, with whom he worked from 1957 to 1958.

Returning to Chicago, Wilson played with Gene Ammons, Sonny Stitt, Eddie Harris and Al Hibbler. His longest gig there was at the Pershing Lounge with bassist Richard Evans, with whom Jack made his recording debut as a sideman on Richard's Almanac (July 21–23, 1959). Drafted into the Army, he went to Fort Stewart, Georgia, and became the first Black music director for the Third Army Area, playing tenor saxophone in the army band.

In 1961, Wilson received an honorable medical discharge (because of diabetes). He returned to Dinah Washington's band from 1961 to 1962. Encouraged by Buddy Collette, he moved to Los Angeles.

In Los Angeles, Wilson worked for Gerald Wilson, Lou Donaldson, Herbie Mann, Jackie McLean and Johnny Griffin. Frequently in and out of the studio for recording, film and television work, he did stints with Sammy Davis Jr., Sarah Vaughan, Lou Rawls, Eartha Kitt, Julie London, as well as Sonny & Cher.

He appeared on and wrote the title track for Earl Anderza's debut album Outa Sight! (1962).

In 1965, Jack Wilson recorded the album Jack Wilson Plays Brazilian Mancini together with Antonio Carlos Jobim.

Jack Wilson was part of the Ike Isaacs Trio and is a strong presence on several of Lambert, Hendricks & Ross recordings including Sing Ellington.

=== Bandleader ===
In 1963 Wilson recorded his first album as a leader, The Jack Wilson Quartet Featuring Roy Ayers for Atlantic Records (January 24 & February 6). The session began off with Wilson's blazing "Jackleg". This lively session was followed by another Atlantic date fifteen months later, three sessions for Vault (Atlantic's subsidiary) and then an invitation to the Blue Note label, the results of which produced three records, including Easterly Winds in 1967.

After his final Blue Note session in 1968, Wilson focused on work with vocalist Esther Phillips until 1977, when he recorded Innovations, the first of three record dates for the Los Angeles-based Discovery label. This also brought about a return to sideman work with Lorez Alexandria, Tutti Camarata and Eddie Harris well into the 1980s.

In 1985, Jack relocated to New York City with the help of jazz pianist Barry Harris and appeared in duo performance with Harris at the Jazz Cultural Theater, a club operated by Harris, 368 Eighth Avenue (between 28th and 29th Streets), on February 1, 1985. Wilson continued to work for several years in New York City. Among his many appearances was a duo with bassist Boots Maleson at Joanna's restaurant, 18 East 18th Street, on August 30, 1986 and in duet with bassist Peter Washington at Bradley's bar and restaurant, University & East 12th Street, on March 3, 1989.

Wilson's final recording session (for the Japanese DIW label), simply titled In New York, took place on June 4, 1993 and featured drummer Jimmy Cobb.

== Death ==
Wilson died on October 5, 2007, of natural causes.

== Discography ==
- The Jack Wilson Quartet featuring Roy Ayers (Atlantic, 1963)
- The Two Sides of Jack Wilson (Atlantic, 1964)
- The Jazz Organs (Vault, 1964)
- Jack Wilson Plays Brazilian Mancini (Vault, 1965)
- Ramblin' (Vault, 1966)
- Something Personal (Blue Note, 1966)
- Easterly Winds (Blue Note, 1967)
- Song for My Daughter (Blue Note, 1969)
- Autumn Sunset (Discovery, 1977)
- Innovations (Discovery, 1977)
- Margo's Theme (Discovery, 1979)
- In New York (DIW, 1993)

With Curtis Amy

- Katanga! (Pacific Jazz, 1963)

With Earl Anderza

- Outa Sight (Pacific Jazz, 1962)

With Roy Ayers

- Virgo Vibes (Atlantic, 1967)

With Clark Terry

- Memories of Duke (Pablo Today, 1980)

With Gerald Wilson

- Moment of Truth (Pacific Jazz, 1962)
- Portraits (Pacific Jazz, 1964)
- On Stage (Pacific Jazz, 1965)
- The Golden Sword (Pacific Jazz, 1966)
- Live and Swinging (Pacific Jazz, 1967)
- Everywhere (Pacific Jazz, 1968)
