= The Two Sides of Jack Wilson =

Studio album by Jack Wilson
- Released: 1964
- Recorded: May 13, 1964; Los Angeles, CA
- Genre: Jazz
- Length: 36:40
- Label: Atlantic; SD 1427
- Producer: Jack Lewerke

Jack Wilson chronology
The Jack Wilson Quartet featuring Roy Ayers (1963)	The Two Sides of Jack Wilson (1964)	The Jazz Organs (1964)

The Two Sides of Jack Wilson is an album by American jazz pianist Jack Wilson recorded for the Atlantic label and released in 1964. The album title refers to the uptempo tracks featured on side one of the original LP and the ballads on side two.

== Reception ==
Professional ratings
Review scores
Source	Rating
AllMusic	3/5 stars

AllMusic awarded the album 3 stars, stating: "Wilson has a good piano trio date here in the classic style: focus on the piano, with stellar support from an immensely capable rhythm team."

== Track listing ==
All compositions by Jack Wilson except as indicated

1. "The Scene Is Clean" (Tadd Dameron) - 5:29
2. "Glass Enclosure" (Bud Powell) - 3:42
3. "Good Time Joe" - 5:07
4. "Kinta" - 3:59
5. "Once Upon a Summertime" (Eddie Barclay, Michel Legrand, Eddy Marnay, Johnny Mercer) - 3:33
6. "Sometime Ago" (Sergio Mihanovich) - 3:00
7. "The Good Life" (Sacha Distel, Jack Reardon) - 4:42
8. "The End of a Love Affair" (Edward Redding) - 7:08

== Personnel ==
- Jack Wilson - piano
- Leroy Vinnegar - bass
- Philly Joe Jones - drums
