= The Incredible Honk =

Studio album by Roswell Rudd
- Released: 2011
- Genre: Jazz
- Label: Sunnyside; SSC 1279

Roswell Rudd chronology
Trombone Tribe (2009)	The Incredible Honk (2011)	Trombone for Lovers (2013)

The Incredible Honk is an album by trombonist Roswell Rudd. It was released by Sunnyside Records in 2011. On the album, Rudd is joined by guitarist David Doucet, accordion player Jimmy Breaux, pianists Lafayette Harris and Ivan Rubenstein-Gillis, organist Arne Wendt, bassists Mitchell Reed and Richard Hammond, and drummers Aaron Comess and Tommy Alesi.

== Reception ==
Professional ratings
Review scores
Source	Rating
AllMusic	4.5/5 stars
DownBeat	4.5/5 stars
All About Jazz	5/5 stars

In a review for AllMusic, Ken Dryden wrote: "Roswell Rudd takes the listener on a worldwide journey with his diverse musical interests... The Incredible Honk is one of the rare CDs that will broaden the listening experience of everyone."

Writing for DownBeat, John Corbett commented: "I can't recall having heard such a project as beautiful, open hearted and convincing as The Incredible Honk in a long time. In its multidirectionality, it's a singular achievement, a testimonial to how Roswell Rudd is musically imbued down to the tiniest microbe."

Raul d'Gama Rose of All About Jazz awarded the album 5 stars, calling it "superb," and stating: "Rudd pays tribute to the art of song in inimitable fashion. His grasp of melody is absolutely flawless and so utterly pure that he seems to almost exist in a parallel universe, where he can do no wrong. Rudd's musicality is so superior and his voicing and attack so perfect that he matches the seemingly limitless expanse that the human voice traverses."

== Track listings ==
1. "Feeling Good" – 3:48
2. "Dame la mano" – 6:47
3. "Berlin, Alexanderplatz" – 5:47
4. "C'était dans la nuit" – 5:07
5. "Arirang" – 5:27
6. "Waltzin' with My Baby" – 5:29
7. "Blue Flower Blue" – 7:22
8. "Alone with the Moon" – 3:43
9. "Kerhonkson: The Muse-ical" – 3:55
10. "BRO" – 2:25
11. "Ngoni Vortex" – 4:20
12. "Airborne" – 4:05
13. "Danny Boy" – 6:28

== Personnel ==
- Roswell Rudd – trombone
- Wu Tong — sheng, vocals
- David Doucet – acoustic guitar
- David Oquendo — guitar, vocals
- Michael Doucet — fiddle, vocals
- Bassekou Kouyate, Fousseni Kouyate —ngoniba
- Omar Barou Kouyate — medium ngoni
- Moussa Bah — ngoni bass
- Jimmy Breaux – accordion
- Lafayette Harris – piano
- Ivan Rubenstein-Gillis – piano, percussion
- Arne Wendt – organ
- Mitchell Reed, Richard Hammond, Henry Schroy – electric bass
- Ken Filiano, John Lindberg— acoustic bass
- Aaron Comess, Tommy Alesi – drums
- Billy Ware — percussion
- Alou Coulibaly — calabash
- Moussa Sissoko — yabara
- Sunny Kim, Emily Haines — vocals
