= Song for My Daughter =

Studio album by Jack Wilson
- Released: 1969
- Recorded: September 28 & December 16, 1968 and April 23, June 19, 21 26, 1969
- Genre: Jazz
- Label: Blue Note

Jack Wilson chronology
Easterly Winds (1967)	Song for My Daughter (1969)	Autumn Sunset (1977–79)

Song for My Daughter is an album by American jazz pianist Jack Wilson featuring performances recorded in 1968 and 1969 and released on the Blue Note label.

== Reception ==
The Allmusic review by Stephen Thomas Erlewine awarded the album 3 stars and stated "Like many of his peers on the label, Wilson pursued a pop direction as the '60s drew to a close, which meant he covered pop hits... Although the production has dated somewhat, it remains a pleasant artifact of its time, and fans of that sound should search for it".

Professional ratings
Review scores
Source	Rating
Allmusic	3/5 stars

== Track listing ==
All compositions by Jack Wilson except as indicated

1. "Imagine"
2. "Herman's Helmet"
3. "Changing with the Times"
4. "Night Creature" (Duke Ellington)
5. "Scarborough Fair/Canticle" (Traditional)
6. "Song for My Daughter"
7. "Eighty-One" (Ron Carter)
8. "Se Todos Fossem Iguais a Você" (Antonio Carlos Jobim)
9. "Stormy" (Buddy Buie, James Cobb)
10. "Soft Summer Rain" (David Baker)

- Recorded at Liberty Studios in West Hollywood, California on September 28, 1968 (tracks 1, 3 & 8), December 16, 1968 (tracks 2, 4 & 7), April 23, 1969 (track 10), June 19, 1969 (track 5), June 21 & 26, 1969 (tracks 6 & 9).

== Personnel ==
- Jack Wilson – piano
- Stan Levey – vibes, shaker (tracks 1, 3 & 8)
- Victor Feldman – vibes, timpani (tracks 2, 4 & 7)
- Tommy Vig – vibes (track 10)
- John Gray (tracks 1, 3 & 8), Howard Roberts (tracks 2, 4, 7 & 10) – guitar
- Ray Brown (tracks 1, 3, 8 & 10), Ike Issacs (track 5 & 9), Andrew Simpkins (tracks 2, 4 & 7) – bass
- Donald Bailey (tracks 5, 9 & 10), Varney Barlow (tracks 1, 3 & 8), Jimmie Smith (tracks 2, 4 & 7) – drums
- Billy Byers – arranger, conductor (tracks 1–4 & 6–9)
- Unidentified strings
