= Keep Your Heart Right =

Studio album by Roswell Rudd Quartet
- Released: June 24, 2008
- Recorded: 2008
- Genre: Jazz
- Label: Sunnyside; SSC 1188

Roswell Rudd chronology
El Espíritu Jíbaro (2007)	Keep Your Heart Right (2008)	El Encuentro (2008)

Keep Your Heart Right is an album by trombonist Roswell Rudd which was recorded and released on the Sunnyside label in 2008.

== Critical reception ==
Professional ratings
Review scores
Source	Rating
Allmusic	4/5 stars
The Guardian	3/5 stars
All About Jazz	4.5/5 stars

The Allmusic review by Michael G. Nastos stated "Rudd's idea on this CD is to mix up some old favorites, Gilbert & Sullivan-inspired stage-type songs, and his trademark modern jazz – all as a vehicle for the introduction of the excellent songbird Sunny Kim. She is as impressive as any vocalist you might hear in contemporary music ... this is Roswell Rudd's best effort of the 2000s, and marks an auspicious coming out for the extremely talented and likable Sunny Kim".

In The Guardian John Fordham wrote "On this uneven but heartwarmingly honest and rather oddball set, Rudd lets his roots show. Working with a drumless band featuring South Korean vocalist Sunny Kim, he delivers a gospel- and blues-based album".

On All About Jazz Fred Bouchard noted "To witness, even overhear, transcendent conversations such as these may well contribute to cures for what ails us, individually and collectively, short-term or bone-deep".

In JazzTimes Steve Greenlee said "his new record, Keep Your Heart Right, is a difficult one to understand ... Maybe the problem is that I wasn't prepared for Rudd to go head-to-head with this particular singer. But expectation informs experience, and when I pop in a Roswell Rudd disc, I expect to be surprised, entertained and awakened. None of that happened this time".

== Track listing ==
All compositions by Roswell Rudd except where noted

1. "Keep Your Heart Right" – 6:37
2. "Loved by Love" (based on a poem by Gabriel García Márquez) – 5:22
3. "I Look in the Mirror" (lyrics by Verna Gillis) – 5:00
4. "The Light Is with Me" – 7:12
5. "I'm Going Sane (One Day at a Time)" (arranged by Roswell Rudd, lyrics by Verna Gillis) – 5:39
6. "Bamako" (lyrics by Verna Gillis) – 5:56
7. "All Nite Soul" – 6:46
8. "Suh Blah Blah Buh Sibi" – 7:21
9. "You Blew It" – 4:30
10. "Whatever Turns You On Baby" – 6:40

== Personnel ==
- Roswell Rudd – trombone
- Lafayette Harris – piano
- Bradley Jones – bass
- Sunny Kim – vocals
