= Strength & Power =

Studio album by Roswell Rudd, Jamie Saft, Trevor Dunn, and Balázs Pándi
- Released: 2016
- Recorded: July 2014
- Studio: Potterville International Sound, Kingston, New York
- Genre: Free jazz
- Length: 1:04:35
- Label: RareNoiseRecords; RNR060
- Producer: Jamie Saft and Balázs Pandi

Roswell Rudd chronology
August Love Song (2016)	Strength & Power (2016)	Embrace (2017)

Strength & Power is an album by trombonist Roswell Rudd, pianist Jamie Saft, bassist Trevor Dunn, and drummer Balázs Pándi. It was recorded in July 2014 at Potterville International Sound in Kingston, New York, and was released by RareNoiseRecords in 2016.

The album consists of six freely-improvised tracks. Saft commented: "No predetermined compositions at all. No hand signals, no charts: nothing but trust, deepest intuition, and mutual respect."

== Reception ==
Professional ratings
Review scores
Source	Rating
All About Jazz	4.5/5 stars
All About Jazz	3.5/5 stars

In a review for All About Jazz, C. Michael Bailey praised the "wonderful acoustic quartet who easily demonstrate the sonic power and entropy of free jazz from the origin," and wrote: "While this recording does not seem so ground-breaking by today's atomized standards, it nevertheless, points its telescope lens into that universe created by [Ornette] Coleman in the beginning." In a separate AAJ article, Dan Bilawsky called the album "a powerful blend of untethered and unbelievably exciting music," and stated: "This is one wild ride that cares not for your apprehension, concerns, expectations, or fears."

Britt Robson, writing for Jazz Times, commented: "Strength & Power shows how opting for brute force in a totally improvised context can yield the sort of explosively coherent free jazz that transcends noisemaker stereotypes... Amid all its heave and combustion, the band flaunts an extraordinary unity of evolving purpose, delivering thrilling density and spontaneous agility without confusion. This is vintage free jazz for the 21st century."

Point of Departure's Chris Robinson described the recording as a "dynamic, enjoyable, and inventive album worth numerous repeated listens," and noted: "Rudd et al avoid the all-too-common free improv trap of sinking into a directionless and amorphous morass, devoid of time and purpose."

Raul Da Gama remarked: "This excellent album is like an elegant railway system linking notated jazz with improvised music and the chamber music style of the post-serialist 21st conservatoire. But to describe it as such gives it the impression of overcooking when in fact the whole project is a masterpiece of subtlety."

Tom Hull wrote: "The trombonist has done things like this in the distant past, none recently, and never has he got the mix this right. Saft has emerged as an exceptional free jazz pianist, and the bassist and drummer know the game."

Dave Sumner of Bird is the Worm referred to the album as "a striking and wildly expressive session," and stated: "This is a hard-charging album, but the quartet switches things up between dense walls of dissonance and strategically placed openings to let the conversation hang in the air briefly before getting batted across the room for yet another quick pursuit... when you boil it all down, it's the wild show of personality that represents the album's winning trait."

== Track listing ==
All compositions by Roswell Rudd, Jamie Saft, Trevor Dunn, and Balázs Pándi

1. "Strength and Power" – 18:08
2. "Cobalt is a Divine" – 15:54
3. "The Bedroom" – 5:25
4. "Luminescent" – 9:45
5. "Dunn's Falls" – 7:18
6. "Struttin' for Jah Jah" – 8:09

== Personnel ==
- Roswell Rudd – trombone
- Jamie Saft – piano
- Trevor Dunn – bass
- Balázs Pándi – drums
