= Outa Sight =

Studio album by Earl Anderza
- Released: 1963
- Recorded: March 1962; Pacific Jazz Studios, Los Angeles, CA
- Genre: Jazz
- Length: 51:52
- Labels: Pacific Jazz; PJ 65
- Producer: Richard Bock

Outa Sight is an album by saxophonist Earl Anderza recorded in 1962 and released on the Pacific Jazz label.

== Reception ==
Professional ratings
Review scores
Source	Rating
Allmusic	4/5 stars

The Allmusic review by Scott Yanow states: " Anderza's style, while influenced to an extent by Charlie Parker and Jackie McLean, was also touched a little by Eric Dolphy".

== Track listing ==
All compositions by Earl Anderza, except as indicated.

1. "All the Things You Are" (Jerome Kern, Oscar Hammerstein II) - 5:16
2. "Blues Baroque" - 4:58
3. "You'd Be So Nice to Come Home To" (Cole Porter) - 6:46
4. "Freeway" - 2:28
5. "Outa Sight" (Jack Wilson) - 5:15
6. "What's New?" (Bob Haggart, Johnny Burke) - 7:19
7. "Benign" - 3:59
8. "Lonesome Road" (Nathaniel Shilkret, Gene Austin) - 4:15 Bonus track on CD reissue
9. "I'll Be Around" (Alec Wilder) - 5:15 Bonus track on CD reissue
10. "Freeway" {Alternate Take] - 2:43 Bonus track on CD reissue
11. "Benign" [Alternate Take] - 4:05 Bonus track on CD reissue

== Personnel ==
- Earl Anderza - alto saxophone
- Jack Wilson - piano, harpsichord
- Jimmy Bond (tracks 3 & 7), George Morrow (tracks 1, 2 & 4–6) - bass
- Donald Dean - drums
