= Herbie Nichols Trio =

Album by Herbie Nichols

Studio album by Herbie Nichols
- Released: 1956
- Recorded: August 1 & 7, 1955 and April 19, 1956
- Studio: Van Gelder Studio; Hackensack, New Jersey
- Genre: Jazz
- Length: 42:57
- Label: Blue Note; BLP 1519
- Producer: Alfred Lion

Herbie Nichols chronology
| The Prophetic Herbie Nichols (1955) | Herbie Nichols Trio (1956) | Love, Gloom, Cash, Love (1957) |

Herbie Nichols Trio is an album by American jazz pianist Herbie Nichols, recorded on August 1 & 7 1955 and April 19, 1956 and released on Blue Note in 1956.

== Reception ==
Although originally unheralded at the time of release, Nichol's Blue Note recordings have gained recognition as highly original and ground-breaking compositions and performances.

The AllMusic review by Scott Yanow awarded Nichols' The Complete Blue Note Recordings, released in 1997, a five-star rating, stating, "The music is virtually unclassifiable, and although largely straight-ahead, sounds unlike anything produced by Herbie Nichols' contemporaries. Essential music."

== Track listing ==
All tracks are written by Herbie Nichols, except as noted.

Side 1
| No. | Title | Writer(s) | Date recorded | Length |
|---|---|---|---|---|
| 1. | "The Gig" | | August 1, 1955 | 4:27 |
| 2. | "House Party Starting" | | August 1, 1955 | 5:41 |
| 3. | "Chit-Chatting" | | August 1, 1955 | 4:04 |
| 4. | "Lady Sings the Blues" | Billie Holiday; Herbie Nichols | August 1, 1955 | 4:25 |
| 5. | "Terpsichore" | | August 7, 1955 | 4:01 |

Side 2
| No. | Title | Writer(s) | Date recorded | Length |
|---|---|---|---|---|
| 1. | "Spinning Song" | | April 19, 1956 | 4:56 |
| 2. | "Query" | | April 19, 1956 | 3:29 |
| 3. | "Wildflower" | | April 19, 1956 | 4:06 |
| 4. | "Hangover Triangle" | | August 1, 1955 | 4:05 |
| 5. | "Mine" | George Gershwin; Ira Gershwin | April 19, 1956 | 4:03 |

== Personnel ==
=== Herbie Nichols Trio ===
==== August 1 & 7, 1955 ====
- Herbie Nichols – piano
- Al McKibbon – bass
- Max Roach – drums

==== April 19, 1956 ====
- Herbie Nichols – piano
- Teddy Kotick – bass
- Max Roach – drums

=== Technical personnel ===
- Alfred Lion – producer
- Rudy Van Gelder – recording engineer
- Reid Miles – design
- Francis Wolff – photography
- Herbie Nichols – liner notes
