= Live (Roswell Rudd and Duck Baker album) =

Live album by Roswell Rudd and Duck Baker
- Released: 2021
- Recorded: January 5, 2002; March 28, 2004
- Venue: Tonic, New York City; The Outpost, Albuquerque, New Mexico
- Genre: Jazz
- Label: Dot Time Records; DT8020

Roswell Rudd chronology
Embrace (2017)	Live (2021)

Live is a live album by trombonist Roswell Rudd and guitarist Duck Baker. Five tracks were recorded at Tonic in New York City on January 5, 2002, while the remaining tracks were recorded at the Outpost in Albuquerque, New Mexico, on March 28, 2004. The album was released by Dot Time Records in 2021.

== Reception ==
Professional ratings
Review scores
Source	Rating
DownBeat	4/5 stars
All About Jazz	3.5/5 stars
Take Effect	8/10 stars
The Audio Beat	5/5 stars

In a review for DownBeat, Howard Mandel wrote: "The unusual jazz trombone-folk guitar format provides for an unusual paring, one that requires a delicate balance regarding timbre and dynamics, which these players achieved through listening closely to each other. Rudd is a natural storyteller, full of detail and personality... Baker provides lovely, lilting rhythms, precisely graceful touch and rich personal imagination."

Jazz Journal's Matthew Wright called the album "thoroughly enjoyable," and stated that it "reveals a landscape of improvisation and sound which shows mutual respect, close interaction and understanding, touching on shared reference points."

George W. Harris of Jazz Weekly described the album as "a surprisingly satisfying treat," and "a fantastically surprising successful mix of sounds, with moods ranging from pre-swing to the wide beyond of the future," and noted that "the genius of the album comes in the song selection."

A writer for Take Effect called the album "very interesting and cozy," and commented: "A very enticing platform for Rudd and Baker's immense talent, you might not feel that a duet record between guitar and trombone could yield such a result, but in these very capable hands it's to be expected."

Writing for The Whole Note, Stuart Broomer remarked: "these performances range from broad entertainment to high art... The duo is capable of playfulness and genuine sentiment, creating a sense of authentic dialogue."

Making a Scene's Jim Hynes wrote: "Baker's thoughtful accompaniment act as the perfect complement to Rudd's free-wheeling improvisation... This is a singular recording worth seeking out for fans of jazz and blues alike. It may be the only pairing of its kind."

Kevin Whitehead of The Audio Beat stated: "Trombone plus guitar is odd but not unknown... though usually with electric guitar, where Baker plays nylon or steel-string acoustic. Trombone and guitar do go together: both sound hefty in the tenor midrange, and both can get percussive. Boisterous Rudd never lost a Dixielander's love of a good racket..., and Baker has a forceful string attack and crack timing."

== Track listing ==
1. "The Happenings" – 7:00
2. "Buddy Bolden's Blues" – 3:14
3. "A Bouquet For JJ" – 4:22
4. "Melancholy People" – 7:44
5. "Well, You Needn't" – 5:44
6. "Bemsha Swing" – 5:06
7. "Going West" – 6:48
8. "Light Blue" – 4:54
9. "Show" – 7:08
10. "Church" – 10:07
- Tracks 3–5 and 9–10 were recorded at Tonic in New York City on January 5, 2002. Tracks 1–2 and 6–8 were recorded at the Outpost in Albuquerque, New Mexico on March 28, 2004.

== Personnel ==
- Roswell Rudd – trombone
- Duck Baker – guitar
