= The Unheard Herbie Nichols, Vol. 1 =

Studio album by Roswell Rudd
- Released: 1997
- Recorded: November 18–19, 1996
- Studio: The Spirit Room, Rossie, NY
- Genre: Jazz
- Label: CIMP; CIMP 133
- Producer: Bob Rusch

Roswell Rudd chronology
Regeneration (1983)	The Unheard Herbie Nichols, Vol. 1 (1997)	The Unheard Herbie Nichols, Vol. 2 (1997)

The Unheard Herbie Nichols, Vol. 1 is an album by trombonist Roswell Rudd. It was recorded in November 1996 at The Spirit Room in Rossie, NY, and was released by CIMP in 1997. On the album, which features little-heard works by composer and pianist Herbie Nichols, Rudd is joined by guitarist Greg Millar and drummer John Bacon, Jr.

The album, which is the companion to The Unheard Herbie Nichols, Vol. 2, was part of an effort to revive the reputation of Nichols, with whom Rudd worked between 1960 and 1962. According to Rudd, Nichols was using the compositions to teach him improvisation and form. He recalled: "I realized then that what we were doing needed to be recorded. No takers... until, fast forward to two exhausting, uplifting, back-to-back days at CIMP... It was a modest budget but we had free rein and were able to lay down respectful outlines of 15 of the folio of 27 songs. It was a long, long hope come true."

== Reception ==
Professional ratings
Review scores
Source	Rating
AllMusic	3/5 stars
The Penguin Guide to Jazz	4/4 stars

In a review for AllMusic, Scott Yanow wrote: "On this 1996 set, Rudd debuts seven Nichols compositions that were never previously recorded... Five of the pieces... feature the entire group, and although the structures are quite tricky, the music... generally swings in its own fashion. The final two numbers... are taken as unaccompanied trombone solos and find Rudd putting plenty of feeling into his interpretations of his fallen friend's music. Overall, this is an intriguing set of 'new' music."

The authors of The Penguin Guide to Jazz awarded the album 4 stars, and commented: "Much of this material is genuinely unknown and unheard... The trio is well-balanced and responsive, with Millar taking much of the accompanist's role... A valuable insight into two great – and sadly under-documented – artists."

Bill Shoemaker, writing for Jazz Times, remarked: "Nobody knows better than Rudd that Nichols was not a simple modernist, that the unfettered swing of Nichols' often complex music was shaped by the music of the '20 and '30s, and that of his Caribbean roots. Rudd incisively conveys this insight in a wide variety of compositions... Rudd's arrangements also reflect his own idiosyncratic genius, as these performances veer far away from the standard head-solos-head mold... Hearing Rudd soar exultantly in this setting may very well prompt you to dig out his vintage recordings; it's a shame that so few of them are available on domestic CDs."

Writer Todd Jenkins stated: "These interpretations... are not only fabulous, they make us regretful that we can never hear them played by their creator's hands."

== Track listing ==
All compositions by Herbie Nichols.

1. "Freudian Frolics" – 5:30
2. "Valse Macabre" – 1:37
3. "Jamaica" – 16:23
4. "Prancin' Pretty Woman" – 7:41
5. "Karna Kanji" – 9:27
6. "One Twilight" – 4:25
7. "Passing Thoughts" – 9:17

== Personnel ==
- Roswell Rudd – trombone, mellophone, percussion, trumpet
- Greg Millar – guitar
- John Bacon, Jr. – drums
