= Eventuality =

Eventuality: The Charlie Kohlhase Quintet Plays the Music of Roswell Rudd

Studio album by The Charlie Kohlhase Quintet with Roswell Rudd
- Released: 2000
- Recorded: January 19–20, 2000
- Studio: PBS Studios, Westwood, Massachusetts
- Genre: Jazz
- Length: 1:10:22
- Label: Nada Music nada 002
- Producer: Joe Washek

Roswell Rudd chronology
Broad Strokes (2000)	Eventuality: The Charlie Kohlhase Quintet Plays the Music of Roswell Rudd (2000)	Live in New York (2001)

Eventuality: The Charlie Kohlhase Quintet Plays the Music of Roswell Rudd is an album by saxophonist Charlie Kohlhase on which he and his quintet perform music composed by trombonist Roswell Rudd, with whom he studied.

The album was recorded at PBS Studios in Westwood, Massachusetts in January 2000 and released later that year by Nada Music. Kohlhase is joined by Rudd on trombone and mellophone, Matt Langley on saxophone, John Carlson on trumpet and flugelhorn, John Turner on bass and Johnny McLellan on drums.

Regarding poor distribution, Kohlhase commented: "No one can find it anywhere in the world. It's a great album but it's a top secret album."

== Reception ==
Professional ratings
Review scores
Source	Rating
AllMusic	4.5/5 stars

In a review for AllMusic, David Dupont wrote: "As with all Rudd work, this music is autobiographical in nature, tied to specific situations or portraits of relationships. And as with all his work, it is intensely lyrical... While the trombonist is the most compelling solo voice on the session, everyone else speaks with a distinctive sound, doing justice to the material. The group also is equal to the task of executing the often-tricky ensemble parts."

Writing for All About Jazz, Raul d'Gama Rose called the album an "all but ignored masterpiece" and added: "This album featured some of Rudd's compositions that have not often made it to album, but are wonderful studies in the career of the trombonist and composer."

One Final Note's David Dupont noted that the album "provides a well-rounded portrait" of Rudd, and praised "Siva & Sakti", saying it "draws a lyrical line from the classic ballad writers of Broadway through Monk and [Herbie] Nichols to his own distinctive expression."

Eventuality won "Best Jazz Album" at the 2002 Boston Music Awards.

== Track listing ==
All compositions by Roswell Rudd.

1. "Hermes Trizz" – 1:02
2. "Something of Yours" – 6:49
3. "Joel" – 12:03
4. "Tout de Moi" – 5:08
5. "Emanation" – 4:28
6. "Eventuality" – 8:03
7. "Tetraktys" – 3:08
8. "Sive & Sakti" – 6:29
9. "Prelude to a Lease" – 6:31
10. "Palmer House Rocking" – 13:19
11. "Breaker" – 3:23

== Personnel ==
- Roswell Rudd – trombone, mellophone, vocals
- Charlie Kohlhase – tenor saxophone, alto saxophone, baritone saxophone, vocals
- Matt Langley – tenor saxophone, soprano saxophone, vocals
- John Carlson – trumpet, flugelhorn, vocals
- John Turner – bass
- Johnny McLellan – drums
- Jill Hunter – percussion, vocals (track 5)
- Joe Washek – percussion, vocals (track 5)
