= Love, Gloom, Cash, Love =

Studio album by Herbie Nichols
- Released: 1958
- Recorded: November 1957
- Genre: Jazz
- Length: 41:09
- Label: Bethlehem
- Producer: Lee Kraft

Herbie Nichols chronology
Herbie Nichols Trio (1955–56)	Love, Gloom, Cash, Love (1957)

Love, Gloom, Cash, Love is the last album as leader by jazz pianist Herbie Nichols, featuring performances recorded in 1957 and released on the Bethlehem label in 1958. “Infatuation Eyes” is a solo piano piece paying tribute to Art Tatum, who died in November 1956.

== Reception ==
Professional ratings
Review scores
Source	Rating
All About Jazz	4.5/5 stars
AllMusic	4.5/5 stars

The AllMusic review by Brian Beatty stated: "These performances may be less animated than Nichols' earlier sides as a leader, but that's not to suggest the pianist's writing or playing had become pedestrian or predictable... Nichols' complex melodies and solos shine that much brighter".

Patrick Burnette of All About Jazz noted that the album is "probably the best place to start" with Nichols' music, and commented: "George Duvivier and Dannie Richmond are marvelously energetic and sympatico—the session threatens to break into dance at several points."

A reviewer for Billboard wrote: "His piano stylings are original and his many compositions included here are interesting too... Good wax that should win Nichols new fans."

Critic Martin Williams called the album "exceptional," and remarked: "Nichols is original. He may remind us of Powell and Monk, and of Fats Waller and Teddy Wilson, but it is also obvious that he plays with a jazz style that is thoroughly Nichols."

Author Gene Santoro stated that the album consists of "bracingly nuanced sketches of potentially far richer compositions," and described the title track as "an ambitious waltz with interpolated tempo shifts and turnarounds of jagged scalar riffs, a skeletal X ray of a deeper psychological picture."

== Track listing ==
All compositions by Herbie Nichols, except as indicated

1. "Too Close for Comfort" (Jerry Bock, Larry Holofcener, George David Weiss) - 4:50
2. "Every Cloud" - 3:55
3. "Argumentative" - 3:40
4. "Love, Gloom, Cash, Love" - 4:21
5. "Portrait of Ucha" - 3:48
6. "Beyond Recall" - 4:36
7. "All the Way" (Sammy Cahn, Jimmy Van Heusen) - 4:28
8. "45 Degree Angle" - 4:40 (Denzil Best)
9. "Infatuation Eyes" - 2:45
10. "S'crazy Pad" - 4:06

- Recorded in New York City in November 1957

== Personnel ==
- Herbie Nichols - piano
- George Duvivier - bass (tracks 1–8 & 10)
- Dannie Richmond - drums (tracks 1–8 & 10)
