= Earl Anderza =

American West Coast jazz alto saxophonist

Peter Earl Anderza (October 24, 1933 – 1982) was an American West Coast jazz alto saxophonist. He was born in Los Angeles. He was incarcerated in San Quentin from May, 1959 till October, 1962 and then from June to September, 1964. San Quentin State Prison is where Anderza met Bolton, and played with Art Pepper, among others. In his youth, he studied under Lloyd Reece with friend Eric Dolphy.

Anderza lead two recording dates, one for the album Outa Sight in 1962, and a second in 1963.
