= The Unheard Herbie Nichols, Vol. 2 =

Studio album by Roswell Rudd
- Released: 1997
- Recorded: November 18–19, 1996
- Studio: The Spirit Room, Rossie, NY
- Genre: Jazz
- Label: CIMP; CIMP 146
- Producer: Bob Rusch

Roswell Rudd chronology
The Unheard Herbie Nichols, Vol. 1 (1997)	The Unheard Herbie Nichols, Vol. 2 (1997)	Monk's Dream (2000)

The Unheard Herbie Nichols, Vol. 2 is an album by trombonist Roswell Rudd. It was recorded in November 1996 at The Spirit Room in Rossie, NY, and was released by CIMP in 1997. On the album, which features little-heard works by composer and pianist Herbie Nichols, Rudd is joined by guitarist Greg Millar and drummer John Bacon, Jr.

The album, which is the companion to The Unheard Herbie Nichols, Vol. 1, was part of an effort to revive the reputation of Nichols, with whom Rudd worked between 1960 and 1962. According to Rudd, Nichols was using the compositions to teach him improvisation and form. He recalled: "I realized then that what we were doing needed to be recorded. No takers... until, fast forward to two exhausting, uplifting, back-to-back days at CIMP... It was a modest budget but we had free rein and were able to lay down respectful outlines of 15 of the folio of 27 songs. It was a long, long hope come true."

== Reception ==
Professional ratings
Review scores
Source	Rating
AllMusic	3/5 stars
The Penguin Guide to Jazz	3.5/4 stars

In a review for AllMusic, Michael G. Nastos wrote: "This second volume of excavated music from the floodwaters that destroyed much of Nichols' possessions and undocumented compositions still only scratches the surface, but it's an intriguing facade. Rudd is the perfect person to do the digging, being a close personal friend of the late pianist/composer... Everyone needs to hear more of Herbie Nichols' music, and Rudd as executor makes perfect sense."

The authors of The Penguin Guide to Jazz awarded the album 3½ stars, and commented: "Much of this material is genuinely unknown and unheard... The trio is well-balanced and responsive, with Millar taking much of the accompanist's role... A valuable insight into two great – and sadly under-documented – artists."

Writer Todd Jenkins stated: "These interpretations... are not only fabulous, they make us regretful that we can never hear them played by their creator's hands."

== Track listing ==
All compositions by Herbie Nichols.

1. "Ina" – 7:28
2. "Some Wandering Bushmen" – 7:40
3. "Strange City" – 5:35
4. "Forest Floor" – 6:15
5. "Tee Dum Tee Dee" – 16:48
6. "Dream Time" – 4:36
7. "Old 52nd St. Rag" – 7:28
8. "Vacation Blues" – 4:05

== Personnel ==
- Roswell Rudd – trombone, vocals
- Greg Millar – guitar, percussion
- John Bacon, Jr. – drums, vibraphone
