= Malicool =

Studio album by Roswell Rudd and Toumani Diabaté
- Released: 2002
- Recorded: January 15–21, 2001
- Studio: Studio Bogolan, Bamako, Mali
- Genre: Jazz, World music
- Label: Sunnyside; SSC 3008
- Producer: Verna Gillis

Roswell Rudd chronology
Live in New York (2001)	Malicool (2002)	Blue Mongol (2005)

Malicool (also known as MALIcool) is an album by American trombonist Roswell Rudd and Malian kora player Toumani Diabaté. It was recorded in January 2001 at Studio Bogolan in Bamako, Mali, and was released by Sunnyside Records in 2002. On the album Rudd and Diabaté are joined by balafon player Lassana Diabate, ngoni player Bassekou Kouyate, guitarist Sayon Sissoko, bassist Henry Schroy, djembe player Sekou Diabate, and vocalists Mamadou Kouyate and Dala Diabate.

== Reception ==
Professional ratings
Review scores
Source	Rating
AllMusic	4.5/5 stars
The Penguin Guide to Jazz	2.5/4 stars
All About Jazz	4/5 stars

In a review for AllMusic, Steve Loewy wrote: "At first blush, adding Roswell Rudd to a group of native West African musicians might seem, well, stretched. Surprisingly, though, it proves a remarkably impressive combination... The trombonist is in prime form, relaxed and expansive... the band is tight and well-rehearsed, Rudd's solos rival his best, and the tunes are catchy, simple, and accessible. Fans of the trombonist or of West African music will not wish to miss the opportunity to pick up this rare and exciting collaboration."

Writing for All About Jazz, John Kelman commented: "Cross-cultural exchanges are a risky business. All too often the joining feels forced and unnatural. But... Rudd and the group blend seamlessly to create a sound that is fresh, ethnically rooted and completely organic." In a separate AAJ review, Elliott Simon stated: "with Malicool, Roswell Rudd has written yet another inventive chapter for the trombone... He has made a bold musical statement without changing the overall sensibility of the West African idiom. Such sensitivity is rare in world-jazz projects."

In an article for Jazz Times, Javier Quinones remarked: "The shaping of musical worldviews and tempers was mutual as the repertoire itself well exemplifies... This is the record of an extraordinary international intelligible and emotive musical conversation."

George Tysh of the Detroit Metro Times wrote: "In these 10 seductively relaxed and warmly grounded performances, the New World meets the Cradle of Civilization in such a symbiotic way that it's hard to disentangle the different elements — Rudd sounds like he's been playing with these guys his whole life."

== Track listings ==
1. "Bamako" (Roswell Rudd) – 6:29
2. "Rosmani" (Toumani Diabaté) – 6:05
3. "Jackie-ing" (Thelonious Monk) – 5:43
4. "All Through the Night" (Traditional/arranged by Roswell Rudd) – 2:21
5. "Hank" (Toumani Diabaté) – 5:56
6. "Johanna" (Toumani Diabaté) – 7:51
7. "For Toumani" (Roswell Rudd) – 11:32
8. "Malicool" (Roswell Rudd) – 3:47
9. "Sena et Mariam" (based on George Gershwin's "Summertime") – 7:02
10. "Malijam" (based on Ludwig van Beethoven's "Ode to Joy" theme) – 4:02

== Personnel ==
- Roswell Rudd – trombone
- Toumani Diabaté – kora
- Lassana Diabate – balaphone
- Bassekou Kouyate – ngone
- Sayon Sissoko – guitar
- Henry Schroy – bass
- Sekou Diabate – djembe
- Mamadou Kouyate – voice (tracks 2 and 5)
- Dala Diabate – voice (track 5)
