= Live in New York (Archie Shepp and Roswell Rudd album) =

Live album by Archie Shepp and Roswell Rudd
- Released: 2001
- Recorded: September 23–24, 2000
- Venue: Jazz Standard, New York City
- Genre: Jazz
- Length: 1:13:56
- Label: Verve; 440 013 482-2
- Producer: Verna Gillis

Archie Shepp chronology
| Live In Paris (2000) | Live in New York (2001) | Hungarian Bebop (2002) |

Roswell Rudd chronology
| Eventuality: The Charlie Kohlhase Quintet Plays the Music of Roswell Rudd (2000) | Live in New York (2001) | MALIcool (2002) |

Live in New York is a live album by saxophonist Archie Shepp and trombonist Roswell Rudd. It was recorded in September 2000 at the Jazz Standard in New York City and released by Verve Records in 2001 as part of its Soundscape Series. Shepp and Rudd are accompanied by trombonist Grachan Moncur III, bassist Reggie Workman and drummer Andrew Cyrille. They are joined on one track by poet Amiri Baraka.

== Reception ==
Professional ratings
Review scores
| Source | Rating |
|---|---|
| AllMusic | 4/5 stars |
| The Penguin Guide to Jazz | 3.5/4 stars |
| All About Jazz | 4/5 stars |

In a review for AllMusic, Alex Henderson wrote: "this generally excellent CD marks the reunion of two avant-garde improvisers who were separated for way too long... After more than 30 years apart, was that old chemistry still there? Absolutely. A 63-year-old Shepp... and a 65-year-old Rudd have no problem bringing out the best in one another... Shepp and Rudd keep things unpredictable on this inspired reunion."

The authors of the Penguin Guide to Jazz Recordings stated: "This set... makes the years fall away. Both are palpably older and more mellow... The band is a joy for anyone who remembers these guys first time round."

John Stevenson wrote in All About Jazz: "The CD sizzles with excitement... Reggie Workman... anchors this particular live session with great flair. Ditto Andrew Cyrille who has been grossly overlooked in terms of his contribution to the percussive lexicon... For the more discerning Jazz aficionado, this new Rudd / Shepp collaboration will not disappoint."

Ben Ratliff of The New York Times remarked: "There's a bit of 1960's redux but a ton of heart on Live in New York... this is a clean, open-form record with well-directed improvising mounted on unobtrusive swinging from the bassist Reggie Workman and the drummer Andrew Cyrille. It's a backward-glancing, days-gone-by record, too, with a lot of phrases in the Shepp and Rudd originals right out of Coltrane and Monk."

In an article for The New Yorker, Steve Futterman commented: "Live in New York... is a familiar, yet never comfortable, affair. If the rhythms are more polite, the themes more straightforward and bluesy, and the solos far more economical than in years past, the dogged individuality of both players' tones, not to mention their improvisational ploys, marks them as delightfully unrepentant eccentrics."

== Track listings ==
1. "Keep Your Heart Right" (Rudd) – 2:13
2. "Acute Motelitis" (Rudd) – 8:23
3. "Steam" (Shepp) – 7:33
4. "Pazuzu" (Rudd) – 8:27
5. "We Are the Blues" (Baraka) – 5:46
6. "Ujamma" (Shepp) – 9:16
7. "Bamako" (Rudd) – 5:46
8. "Slide by Slide" (Rudd) – 11:57
9. "Deja Vu" (Shepp) – 3:59
10. "Hope No 2" (Shepp) – 10:38

== Personnel ==
- Archie Shepp – tenor saxophone, piano, vocals
- Roswell Rudd – trombone
- Grachan Moncur III – trombone
- Reggie Workman – bass
- Andrew Cyrille – drums
- Amiri Baraka – poetry
