= Deborah Weisz =

American jazz musician (born 1962)

- Born: June 20, 1962; Chicago, Illinois, United States
- Genres: Jazz
- Occupations: Trombonist, composer, bandleader
- Instrument: Trombone

Deborah Weisz is an American jazz musician. She plays lead trombone for the Deborah Weisz Quintet/Trio.

== Early life ==
Deborah Weisz was born in Chicago to Victor and Alice Mae. She grew up in Phoenix, where she began to play trombone at the age of ten.

== Career ==
Weisz studied music at Mesa Community College in Mesa, Arizona and at the University of Nevada, Las Vegas. After graduation, she became a freelance musician in Las Vegas. While in Las Vegas, Weisz studied and worked with jazz trombonist Carl Fontana. From 1987-1994, she performed for Frank Sinatra.

In 2002, Weisz earned a Master of Arts in Music Composition from New York University. She has taught at Western Connecticut State University and in New York City.

As a composer and arranger, she has worked with the Afrikan Amerikan Jazz Orchestra, NYU Concert Jazz Orchestra, and Lou Caputo.

== Discography ==
- Breaking Up, Breaking Out (Va Wah) 1997
- Grace, (Va Wah), 2005

== Awards ==
- Julius Hemphill Jazz Composition Contest (2000)
- BMI Foundation/Charlie Parker Composition Award Finalist (2001)
- New England Foundation for the Arts Meet the Composer Commission (2004)
