= Monk's Dream (Steve Lacy album) =

Studio album by Steve Lacy & Roswell Rudd
- Released: March 7, 2000
- Recorded: June 21–22, 1999
- Genre: Jazz
- Length: 76:01
- Label: Verve
- Producer: Steve Lacy

Steve Lacy chronology
The Joan Miro Foundation Concert (1999)	Monk's Dream (2000)	Sideways (2000)

Roswell Rudd chronology
The Unheard Herbie Nichols, Vol. 2 (1997)	Monk's Dream (2000)	Broad Strokes (2000)

Monk's Dream is an album by Steve Lacy and Roswell Rudd, released on the Verve label in 2000. It features performances by Lacy, Rudd, Jean-Jacques Avenel, John Betsch and Irene Aebi's vocals on two tracks.

== Reception ==
Professional ratings
Review scores
Source	Rating
AllMusic	4/5 stars
The Penguin Guide to Jazz Recordings	3.5/4 stars

The AllMusic review by William Ruhlmann stated: "Monk's Dream is a warm reunion of old friends, but those friends could have tried a little harder to come up with something fresh."

The authors of The Penguin Guide to Jazz Recordings wrote: "The trombonist isn't the force of yore... even if the musical intelligence remains keen. Lacy himself is magnificent... Beautifully recorded."

In a review for Jazz Times, Duck Baker commented: "Rudd seems to be on fire these days, as if he's determined to make every note and nuance count, and Lacy sounds delighted to have such an inspired front-line partner. The masterful solos are full of surprise, humor, whimsy and courageous vulnerability, and the two-horn interplay could only be achieved by players with roots that go deep into the trad tradition."

C. Andrew Hovan of All About Jazz remarked: "Monk's Dream stands out as a solid entry in the discographies of both Lacy and Rudd... fans of both artists will come away with a better cognizance of two of the music's unrivaled individualists."

== Track listing ==
1. "Monk's Dream" (Monk) - 7:35
2. "The Bath" - 11:43
3. "The Rent" - 10:45
4. "Pannonica" (Monk) - 9:26
5. "A Bright Pearl" - 5:55
6. "Traces" (text by Ryōkan) - 8:03
7. "Koko" (Ellington) - 5:21
8. "Grey Blue" - 10:08
9. "The Door" - 7:05

All compositions by Steve Lacy except as indicated
- Recorded at Studios Ferber, Paris, on June 21–22, 1999. Vocals recorded on August 12, 1999

== Personnel ==
- Steve Lacy - soprano saxophone
- Roswell Rudd - trombone
- Jean-Jacques Avenel - bass
- John Betsch - drums
- Irene Aebi (tracks 5 & 6) - vocals
