= Heather Masse =

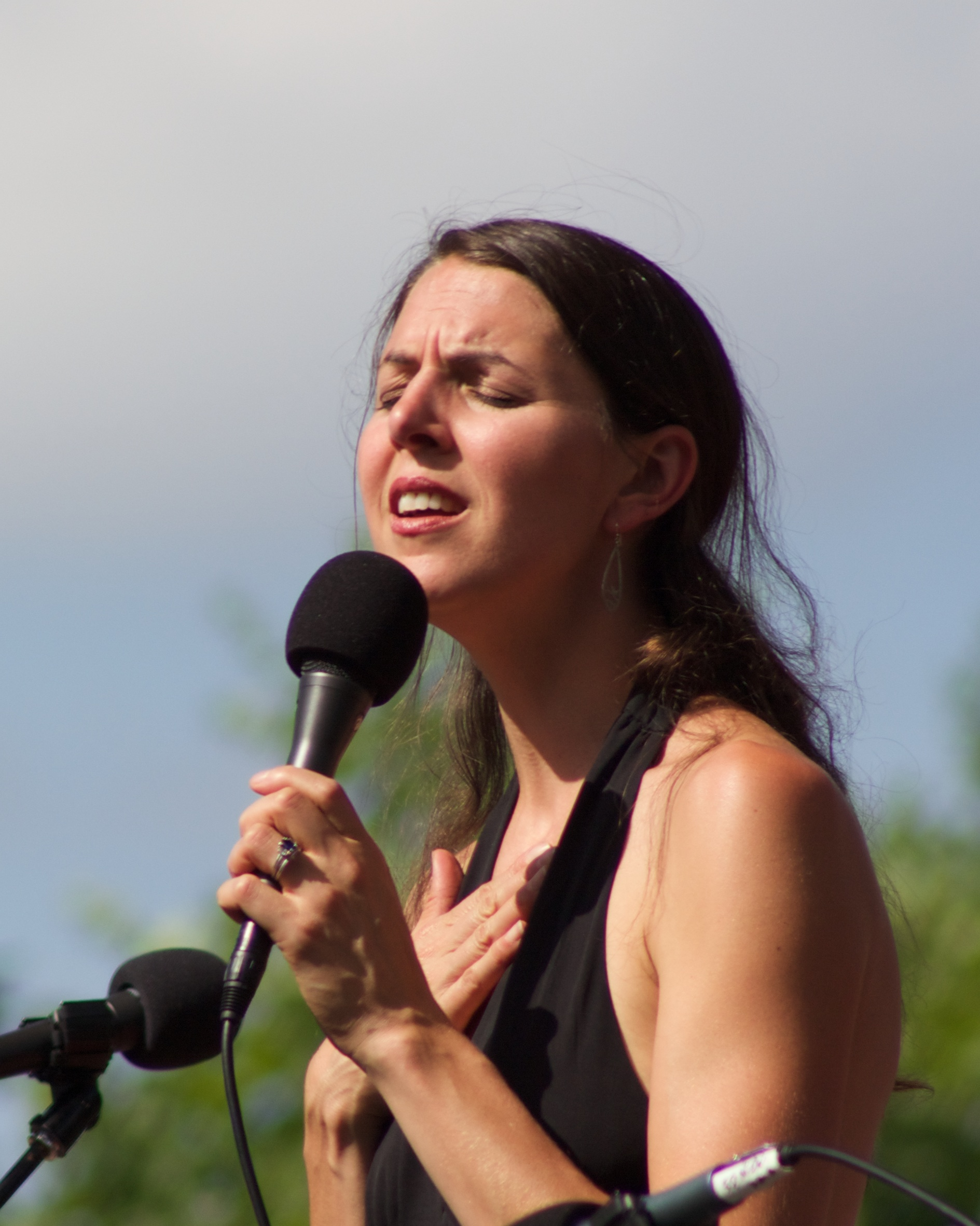
- Heather Masse singing with the Wailin Jennys

Background information
- Born: 1982 (age 43–44); Maine, U.S.
- Genres: Folk, pop, rock, vocal jazz
- Occupation: Musician
- Label: Red House
- Member of: The Wailin' Jennys
- Website: www.heathermasse.com

Heather Masse is an American alto singer and member of the Canadian folk trio The Wailin' Jennys. She was born and grew up in Maine, and studied at the New England Conservatory of Music as a jazz singer. She is currently based in Taos, New Mexico.

Masse joined The Wailin' Jennys in 2007. She released her first solo album, Bird Song, in 2009. She appeared regularly on the American Public Media program, A Prairie Home Companion, and is also a featured vocalist on the 2010 album Found Alive by Noam Weinstein. In 2016, she collaborated with trombonist Roswell Rudd on the album August Love Song.

== Discography ==
- Many Moons (EP) (CD Baby, 2008)
- Bird Song (Red House, 2009)
- The Words Project (New Amsterdam, 2010)
- Lock My Heart (Red House, 2013)
- August Love Song with Roswell Rudd (Red House, 2016)
- Hold On with Jed Wilson (CD Baby, 2019)

Also see The Wailin' Jennys discography.
