= Francis Davis =

American journalist and writer (1946–2025)

- Born: August 30, 1946; Philadelphia, Pennsylvania, U.S.
- Died: April 14, 2025 (aged 78); Philadelphia, Pennsylvania, U.S.
- Occupation: Journalist and author
- Employers: The Village Voice; The Atlantic
- Spouse: Terry Gross (m. 1994)

Francis John Davis (August 30, 1946 – April 14, 2025) was an American author and journalist known for having been the jazz critic for The Village Voice and a contributing editor for The Atlantic. He also taught courses on jazz and blues at the University of Pennsylvania. He was a 1994 recipient of the Pew Fellowships in the Arts.

== Early life ==
Francis John Davis was born in Philadelphia on August 30, 1946. He was raised in Southwest Philadelphia by his mother, who worked as a medical clerk, and his grandmother; he never knew his father. As a teenager, he worked part time at the Free Library of Philadelphia and graduated from John Bartram High School. He attended Temple University from 1964 to 1969.

== Career ==
Davis worked as the jazz critic for The Philadelphia Inquirer from 1978 to 1983. In 1987, when Fresh Air began broadcasting nationally with Terry Gross as host, Davis served as the program's first jazz critic, hosting a weekly radio jazz feature. Davis began writing for The Atlantic in 1984, leading its jazz coverage. Along with his jazz writing he tackled a wide variety of subjects, such as Seinfeld and Johnny Cash, for whom he published what many fans consider the definitive appreciation, in The Atlantic. In his Seinfeld review, Davis labeled character Kramer a "hipster doofus," which the show later incorporated into multiple episodes. Davis was characterized by his keen insights into the development of American style and culture, with asides in the first person which balance his theoretical certainty with a witty, human element. His articles and essays on figures such as Frank Sinatra and Anthony Davis impart a sharp picture of a writer coming of age, and aging, with the artists of his generation.

Over the last few decades of his life he sat with Betty Carter, Sonny Rollins, Wynton Marsalis, Sun Ra, and the late New Yorker film critic, Pauline Kael, after whose lengthy discussions Davis penned, Afterglow: A Last Conversation with Pauline Kael.

Along with international publication Davis was widely recognized with awards, including a Guggenheim Fellowship in 1992, and a Pew Fellowship the following year. He was a multiple recipient of the ASCAP-Deems Taylor Award, and was nominated for a Grammy Award in 1989 (with Martin Williams and Dick Katz) for his liner notes to Jazz Piano for the Smithsonian Collection of Recordings. Davis won the 2009 Grammy Award for Best Album Notes, for the Miles Davis album, Kind of Blue: 50th Anniversary Collector's Edition.

Stanley Crouch, a jazz critic who frequently wrote about race relations, wrote in a 2003 JazzTimes column that Davis allegedly spoke with condescension toward the predominantly black contingent of musicians who create "jazz that is based on swing and blues." Because of what Crouch alleged to be underlying racial resentment and fear, Davis "lifts up someone like, say, Dave Douglas as an antidote to too much authority from the dark side of the tracks," according to Crouch. Crouch was fired from Jazz Times after writing the column.

Davis taught courses on jazz and blues at the University of Pennsylvania and Temple University.

In 2004, Davis inherited the main jazz column at The Village Voice from Gary Giddins. In 2006, he started the year-end Jazz Critics Poll. He ran the poll at the Village Voice until 2011, later running it at NPR Music from 2013 to 2020. The poll moved to The Arts Fuse in 2022.

== Personal life and death ==
While attending Temple University, Davis worked at the Listening Booth, a record store on the University of Pennsylvania campus. While working there, he met Terry Gross, his future wife. The two married in 1994.

In the autumn of 2024, Davis moved into hospice, having been diagnosed with emphysema and Parkinson's disease. He died at home in Philadelphia, on April 14, 2025, at the age of 78.

== Bibliography ==
- In the Moment (Oxford University Press, 1986; OL 2715400M, ISBN 0195040902)
- Outcats (Oxford University Press, 1990; OL 7386610M, ISBN 019505587X)
- The History of the Blues (Hyperion, 1995; OL 1098645M, ISBN 0306812967)
- Bebop and Nothingness (Schirmer, 1996; OL 792002M, OCLC 32822584, ISBN 0028704711)
- Like Young (Da Capo, 2001; OL 9569333M, OCLC 48104632, ISBN 9780306810565)
- Afterglow: A Last Conversation with Pauline Kael (Da Capo, 2002; OL 10325581M, OCLC 50557407, ISBN 9780306811920)
- Jazz and Its Discontents: A Francis Davis Reader (Da Capo, 2004; OL 9903425M, ISBN 9780306810558)
