= Verna Gillis =

American freelance record producer (born 1942)

Verna Gillis (born 1942) is an American freelance record producer, who has gained recognition for her work promoting and producing music from various cultural backgrounds. Gillis holds a Ph.D. in ethnomusicology. She was an assistant professor at Brooklyn College from 1974 to 1980 and at Carnegie Mellon University from 1988 to 1990.

Gillis has been the subject of a number of press articles, with The New York Times describing her as "the closest thing world music has to a doyenne".

== Life and career ==
From 1972 to 1978, Gillis recorded traditional music in Afghanistan, Iran, Kashmir, Haiti, the Dominican Republic, Peru, Surinam, and Ghana. In 1979, she opened Soundscape, the first multi-cultural performance space in New York City, on west 52nd Street which she directed for the next five years. Gillis, Soundscape and the music played there is the subject of a web based project by WKCR Radio 89.9 NY.

From 1984, Gillis worked on career development with international musicians including Youssou N'dour from Senegal (The Guide (Wommat)), Yomo Toro from Puerto Rico; Salif Keita form Mali, and Carlinhos Brown from Brazil.

In 1996, she was hired as a consultant by the International Committee of the Red Cross (ICRC) to accompany musicians on a trip to Angola, Liberia, Kenya and South African, to witness first hand the results of ethnic cleansing. Gillis worked with the ICRC to produce a CD.

Twenty-five of Gillis' recordings have been released by Smithsonian Folkways and Lyrichord. As well, there have been nine releases on DIW of Live from Soundscape tapes, made during the years that the performance space which was located at 500 West 52nd Street was open.

In 2000, she was nominated for a Grammy Award in the Producer category for the Archie Shepp/Roswell Rudd Quartet Live in New York, and again in 2001 for Roswell Rudd's MALIcool.

She has performed "sit down comedy" – and has a One Older Woman show Tales from Geriassic Park - On the Verge of Extinction which won Best Comedic Script in 2014 at the United Solo Theatre Festival in NYC> She has published three books, I Just Want to be Invited - I Promise Not to Come,I'll Never Know If I Would Have Gotten The Same Results if I'd Been Nice. and "The I of the Storm."

She lived and collaborated with trombonist/composer Roswell Rudd from 1999 - 2017 when he died. They formed a group they call The Olders. Their video AWEMSONE & GRUESOME can be seen on Youtube.

== Discography ==
- 1973 Folk Music from Afghanistan: In Kabul (Lyrichord LLST 7259)
- 1973 Folk Music from Kashmir: On Lake Dal (Lyrichord LLST 7260)
- 1973 Folk Music from Iran: Luristan and Fars Provinces (Lyrichord LLST 7261)
- 1976 The Island of Quisqueya - Dominican Republic - Vol. I (Folkways FE 4281)
- 1976 The Island of Española - Dominican Republic - Vol. II (Folkways FE 4281)
- 1976 Cradle of the New World - Dominican Republic - Vol. III (Folkways FE 4283)
- 1976 Peru: Music from the Land of Macchu Picchu (Lyrichord LLST 7294)
- 1976 Vodun: Radad Rite for Erzulie - Haiti (Folkways FE 4491)
- 1977 Suriname - Javanese Music (Lyrichord LLST 7317)
- 1978 Songs from the North - Dominican Republic - Vol. LV (Folkways FE 4284)
- 1978 Rara in Haiti - Gaga in the Dominican Republic (Folkways 4531)
- 1978 Kora Music from the Gambia - Foday Music Suso (Folkways FW 8510)
- 1978 Anpao - An American Indian Odyssey (Folkways FC 7776)
- 1978 Ghana - Music of the Northern Tribes (Lyrichord LLST 7321)
- 1978 Music of the Dagomba from Ghana (Folkways FTS 32425)
- 1979 Comanche Flute Music Played by Doc Tate Nevaquaya (Folkways FE 4328)
- 1979 Music of the Ashanti of Ghana (Folkways FE 4240)
- 1979 David "Honeyboy" Edwards – Mississippi Delta Blues Singer (Folkways FTS 32425)
- 1979 Rev. Audrey Bronson – Are You Ready for Christmas? (Folkways FS 32425)
- 1980 African, New York – Drum Masterpieces with Ladji Camara (Lyrichord LLST 7345)
- 1981 South Indian Strings – L. Subramaniam (Lyrichord LLST 7350)
- 1981 Merengues from the Dominican Republic (Lyrichord LLST 7351
- 1981 Traditional Women's Music from Ghana (Folkways FE 4257)
- 1981 From Slavery to Freedom – Music of the Saramaka Maroons of Suriname (Lyrichord - List 7354)
- 1982 Nicholas Guillen – Poet Laureate of Revolutionary Cuba (Folkways FI 9941)
- 1985 Music of Cuba (Folkways FE 4064)
