= Unheard Music Series =

The Unheard Music Series is an imprint of the American record label Atavistic Records. The series, running since 2000, is curated by Chicago writer and producer John Corbett and focuses mainly on free jazz recordings from the 1960s and 1970s. The series includes reissues of previously out-of-print recordings, notably from the catalog of the German label FMP, and also incorporates previously unreleased material. The project was conceived after Corbett received a fellowship to research material in German radio archives. An initial blurb from the label's website stated: "Drawing from radio archives, private tapes, collections of rare vinyl, and all sorts of unreleased sessions, often working hand-in-hand with the artists themselves, the series will focus on filling gaps in the historical record and illuminating otherwise dark corners of the musical continuum."

The series was launched in May 2000 with the reissue of four LPs by American musicians Joe McPhee and Fred Anderson, German saxophonist Peter Brötzmann, and the Swedish group Mount Everest Trio. Since then there have been several new issues per year. The most frequently represented artist has been Brötzmann, while American bandleader Sun Ra has also been represented multiple times, as have McPhee and German pianist Alexander von Schlippenbach.

== Titles ==
| Catalog no. | Artist | Title | Release date | Notes |
|---|---|---|---|---|
| 201 | Joe McPhee | Nation Time | 2000-05-09 | reissue; originally released on CjR |
| 202 | Mount Everest Trio | Waves from Albert Ayler | 2000-05-09 | |
| 203 | Hal Russell's Chemical Feast | Elixir | 2001-06-19 | |
| 204 | Fred Anderson | The Milwaukee Tapes Vol. 1 | 2000-05-09 | |
| 205 | Peter Brötzmann | Nipples | 2000-05-09 | reissue |
| 206 | Han Bennink | Nerve Beats | 2000-09-05 | |
| 207 | Leo Cuypers | Heavy Days Are Here Again | 2000-09-05 | |
| 208 | Nachtluft | Belle-View I–IV | 2000-09-05 | reissue |
| 209 | Guillermo Gregorio | Otra Musica | 2000-09-05 | |
| 210 | John Tchicai–Irène Schweizer Group | Willi the Pig | 2000-09-05 | reissue |
| 211 | Peter Brötzmann | Fuck de Boere | 2001-05-22 | |
| 212 | Sven-Åke Johansson | Schlingerland | 2000-09-05 | |
| 213 | Alexander von Schlippenbach | Hunting the Snake | 2000-09-05 | |
| 214 | Joe McPhee | Trinity | 2001-03-20 | reissue; originally released on CjR |
| 215 | Luther Thomas' Human Arts Ensemble | Funky Donkey Vols. 1 & 2 | 2001-03-20 | reissue |
| 216 | Rova Saxophone Quartet | As Was | 2001-03-20 | |
| 217 | Moslang–Guhl | Knack On | 2001-03-20 | reissue |
| 218 | Fred Anderson Quartet | Dark Day / Live in Verona | 2001-09-18 | |
| 219 | Haazz & Company | Unlawful Noise | 2001-06-19 | |
| 220 | Starship Beer | Nut Music | 2001-05-22 | reissue |
| 221 | Tom Prehn Kvartet | Tom Prehn Kvartet | 2001-08-21 | reissue |
| 222 | Sun Ra & His Outer Space Arkestra | Nuclear War | 2001-08-21 | reissue |
| 223 | Alexander von Schlippenbach's Globe Unity Orchestra | Globe Unity 67/70 | 2001-09-25 | |
| 224 | Beresford Honsinger Toop Kondo | Double Indemnity / Imitation of Life | 2001-10-23 | |
| 225 | Clifford Thornton | Freedom & Unity | 2001-11-20 | reissue |
| 226 | Joe McPhee | Underground Railroad / Live at Holy Cross | 2001-10-23 | reissue; originally released on CjR |
| 227 | Luther Thomas' Human Arts Ensemble | Banana: The Lost Sessions | 2002-02-19 | |
| 228 | Christman/Müller/Smith/Williams | White Earth Streak | 2001 | reissue |
| 229 | Fred Van Hove | Complete Vogel Recordings | 2002 | |
| 230 | Peter Brötzmann | For Adolphe Sax | 2002-06-04 | reissue |
| 231 | Alexander von Schlippenbach | The Living Music | 2002-08-20 | |
| 232 | Manfred Schoof | European Echoes | 2002-08-20 | reissue |
| 233 | Peter Brötzmann | Balls | 2002-10-08 | reissue |
| 234 | Haazz & Company | Pleasure | 2002 | reissue |
| 235 | Mario Schiano | On the Waiting List | 2004-05-18 | reissue |
| 236 | Peter Brötzmann | More Nipples | 2003-04-08 | |
| 237 | Sun Ra & His Outer Space Arkestra | Music from Tomorrow's World | 2002-11-05 | |
| 238 | George Gruntz | Mental Cruelty | 2003-05-06 | |
| 239 | Alterations | Voila Enough! | 2003-05-06 | Steve Beresford, David Toop, Terry Day, and Peter Cusack |
| 240 | Alexander von Schlippenbach Trio | Pakistani Pomade | 2003-04-08 | |
| 241 | Baby Dodds | Talking and Druum Solos / Country Brass Bands | 2003-11-04 | |
| 242 | Peter Brötzmann | The Inexplicable Flyswatter | 2003 | book and enhanced CD |
| 243 | Sun Ra | Spaceship Lullaby | 2003-11-04 | |
| 244 | Peter Brötzmann | FMP 130 | 2003-09-09 | |
| 245 | Moholo/Stabbins/Tippett | Tern | 2003-09-09 | reissue |
| 246 | Peter Brötzmann | Brötzmann Clarinet Project: Berlin Djungle | 2004-07-27 | reissue |
| 247 | Dudek, Niebergall, & Vesala | Open | 2004-07-27 | reissue |
| 248 | Globe Unity Orchestra & the choir of the NDR-Broadcast | Hamburg '74 | 2004-09-14 | |
| 249 | Per Henrik Wallin | Burning in Stockholm | 2004-11-23 | |
| 250 | The Contemporary Jazz Quintet | Actions 1966–'67 Collection | 2005-04-12 | |
| 252 | Last Exit | Köln | 2005-07-25 | reissue |
| 253 | Sirone | Live | 2005-07-12 | |
| 254 | Brötzmann/Bennink | Schwarzwaldfahrt | 2005-10-11 | |
| 255 | Dieter Scherf Trio | Inside-Out Reflections | 2005-09-13 | reissue |
| 256 | Joe McPhee | Pieces of Light | 2005-10-11 | reissue; originally released on CjR |
| 257 | Peter Brötzmann | Alarm | 2006-06-06 | reissue |
| 258 | Peter Brötzmann | Pica Pica | 2006-07-25 | reissue |
| 259 | Kees Hazevoet and Han Bennink | Calling Down the Flevo Spirit | | reissue |
| 260 | Steve Lacy | Esteem | 2006-09-12 | |
| 261 | Gallio, Voerkel, & Frey | Tiegel | 2006-09-12 | |
| 262 | Peter Brötzmann | The Complete Machine Gun Sessions | 2007-07-21 | |
| 263 | Sun Ra & His Astro Infinity Arkestra | Strange Strings | 2007-06-05 | |
| 264 | Sun Ra & His Intergalactic Infinity Arkestra | The Night of the Purple Moon | 2007-08-21 | |
| 265 | Sun Ra & His Outer Space Arkestra | Some Blues But Not the Kind That's Blue | 2008-01-29 | |
| 266 | Sun Ra & His Solar Arkestra | Secrets of the Sun | 2008-10-07 | |
| 267 | Joe Maneri and Peter Dolger | Peace Concert | 2008-09-09 | |
