= Fuck de Boere =

Live album by Peter Brötzmann Group
- Released: 2001
- Recorded: March 24, 1968; March 22, 1970
- Venue: Frankfurt Jazz Festival, Frankfurt, Germany
- Genre: Free jazz
- Length: 54:07
- Label: Atavistic; ALP211CD
- Producer: John Corbett

Peter Brötzmann chronology
| Right as Rain (2001) | Fuck de Boere (2001) | Organized Chaos (2002) |

Fuck de Boere: Dedicated to Johnny Dyani is a live album by saxophonist Peter Brötzmann containing two tracks recorded at the Frankfurt Jazz Festival in Frankfurt, Germany. Track one, "Machine Gun," was recorded on March 24, 1968, several months before the studio recording that resulted in the album of the same name, and features Brötzmann with saxophonists Willem Breuker, Gerd Dudek, and Evan Parker, pianist Fred Van Hove, bassists Buschi Niebergall and Peter Kowald, and drummers Han Bennink and Sven-Åke Johansson. On track two, the title track, recorded on March 22, 1970, Brötzmann is joined by Breuker and Parker on saxophone, Niebergall, Malcolm Griffiths, Paul Rutherford, and Willem Van Manen on trombone, Van Hove on piano and organ, Derek Bailey on guitar, and Bennink on drums. The album was released in 2001 by Atavistic Records as part of their Unheard Music Series. The album is dedicated to South African bassist Johnny Dyani, who, according to Brötzmann, frequently shouted "Fuck de boere!" when discussing life under apartheid.

Track 1 was included in the 2007 compilation The Complete Machine Gun Sessions.

== Reception ==
Professional ratings
Review scores
| Source | Rating |
|---|---|
| AllMusic | 4.5/5 stars |
| The Penguin Guide to Jazz | 3.5/4 stars |
| Tom Hull – on the Web | B |

In a review for AllMusic, Ian Trumbull wrote: "Just under 55 minutes for the entire album, and it's certainly nothing short of stunning."

The authors of The Penguin Guide to Jazz Recordings called the title track "a typically extravagant opus... which carries all before it, the trombones and saxophones making tumult over the relatively sparse backing."

Writing for All About Jazz, Ludwig vanTrikt called the album "equal parts justified political diatribe and historical relic of the then burgeoning European outcat scene," and commented: "both pieces offer an uncompromising blend of free jazz that lacks the focus and variety of Brötzmann's subsequent work." AAJ's Derek Taylor described the term "de Boere" as "an archetype for any entity or group that seeks to stifle and subjugate the freedoms of others," and remarked: "The aggressive pugnacity inherent in this music is a direct response and affront to any such mongers of oppression." He concluded: "this music still packs a vicious bite and can excoriate the ears as easily as anything a fraction of its age."

Concerning the fact that the music was released decades after it was recorded, S. Victor Aaron of Something Else! suggested: "Maybe they felt the public wasn't ready for music this radical. Now more than forty years later, I'm not sure if the public could ever get ready enough for this."

In an article on "anti-fascist anthems," Stewart Smith of The Quietus described the album as "one of European free jazz's most powerful political statements," and stated that, on the second track, "the horns shriek like industrial steam valves," after which "Bailey's guitar buzzes like a swarm of cyborg insects."

== Track listing ==
Composed by Peter Brötzmann.

1. "Machine Gun" – 17:34
2. "Fuck de Boere (Dedicated to Johnny Dyani)" – 36:33

== Personnel ==
- Peter Brötzmann – saxophone
- Willem Breuker – saxophone
- Gerd Dudek – saxophone (track 1)
- Evan Parker – saxophone
- Malcolm Griffiths – trombone (track 2)
- Paul Rutherford – trombone (track 2)
- Willem Van Manen – trombone (track 2)
- Fred Van Hove – piano, organ
- Derek Bailey – guitar (track 2)
- Buschi Niebergall – bass (track 1), trombone (track 2)
- Peter Kowald – bass (track 1)
- Han Bennink – drums
- Sven-Åke Johansson – drums (track 1)
