= Alarm (album) =

Live album by Peter Brötzmann Group
- Released: 1983
- Recorded: November 12, 1981
- Venues: 164th NDR-Jazzworkshop, NDR Studio 10, Hamburg, Germany
- Genre: Free jazz
- Length: 40:51
- Labels: FMP; 1030
- Producers: Jost Gebers, Peter Brötzmann

Peter Brötzmann chronology
3 Points and a Mountain (1979)	Alarm (1983)	Pica Pica (1984)

Alarm is a live album by saxophonist Peter Brötzmann. It was recorded on November 12, 1981, at NDR Studio 10 (großer Sendesaal) in Hamburg, Germany, during the 164th NDR-Jazzworkshop, and was released in 1983 by FMP/Free Music Production. On the album, Brötzmann is joined by saxophonists Willem Breuker and Frank Wright, trumpeter Toshinori Kondo, trombonists Hannes Bauer and Alan Tomlinson, pianist Alexander von Schlippenbach, bassist Harry Miller, and drummer Louis Moholo. In 2006, the album was reissued on CD by Atavistic Records as part of their Unheard Music Series.

== Reception ==
Professional ratings
Review scores
Source	Rating
AllMusic	3/5 stars
The Penguin Guide to Jazz	3/4 stars
Tom Hull – on the Web	B+
All About Jazz	5/5 stars

In a review for AllMusic, Brian Olewnick wrote: "Alarm is divided into sections featuring small groups of players, sometimes on their own, other times backed up by the other musicians, but never in a traditional soloist's role. The attention is always focussed on their interaction with each other or with the overall group sound... Alarm may not be up to Machine Gun heights, but is enjoyable enough on its own merits."

The authors of The Penguin Guide to Jazz Recordings stated that the album is "stamped by Brötzmann's outsize conception, a dynamic which deepens from loud to very loud. Kondo's cartoon of the trumpet adds an hysterical edge which is underscored by Wright's unrelieved shriek, a sonic brother to the leader's own playing."

Scott Verrastro of JazzTimes noted that the album "consists of what might be called a Brötzmann little big band interpreting a reaction to a nuclear emergency," and commented: "the interaction between these musicians is at such a sophisticated and sympathetic level that it never seems like a free-for-all blowout... Surprisingly, there are moments where it sounds as if a Dixieland band just got off a spaceship and landed in the middle of a war." He concluded: "Alarm matches the best of Brötzmann's visceral, excessive-yet-exhilarating work... but is also a heady concept that succeeds."

Writing for All About Jazz, Nic Jones remarked: "As a musician, Brötzmann has always been iconoclastic in the best sense of the term, even though his roots lay in the big-toned tenor saxophones of the likes of Hawkins and Webster. The resulting balance has made for the kind of multifaceted quality he hasn't been given due credit for. This disc is a case in point, not simply because the music it contains shows an engagement with its time that is all too often missing from improvised music." AAJ's Clifford Allen stated: "in all its nervous overtones, the theme is almost regal in its display, though frantic and chaotic rejoinders arch out in Schlippenbach's player-piano sound-blocks (mostly in dialogue with a callus-shredding Miller) and Wright's pulpit-pounding runs. The music even has its representational moments, Kondo's distorted chatter mimicking the distant, irrelevant and unintelligible calls of an emergency intercom."

Regarding the title track, JazzWord's Ken Waxman wrote: "Driven by the dense and unyielding rhythm section... the massed band exposes the robust theme, variations of which are utilized by the horn section as linking motifs that connect the solos. And what solos they are."

== Track listing ==
1. "Alarm, Part 1" (Brötzmann) – 19:42
2. "Alarm, Part 2" (Brötzmann) – 17:32
3. "Jerry Sacem" (Wright) – 3:38

== Personnel ==
- Peter Brötzmann – saxophone
- Willem Breuker – saxophone
- Frank Wright – saxophone
- Toshinori Kondo – trumpet
- Hannes Bauer – trombone
- Alan Tomlinson – trombone
- Alexander von Schlippenbach – piano
- Harry Miller – bass
- Louis Moholo – drums
