= I Surrender Dear (album) =

Studio album by Peter Brötzmann
- Released: 2019
- Recorded: July 16–18, 2018
- Studio: Martin Siewert's studio, Vienna
- Genre: Jazz
- Length: 57:02
- Label: Trost; TR190

Peter Brötzmann chronology
Philosophy of Sound (2019)	I Surrender Dear (2019)	Live at the Lila Eule 2018 (2019)

I Surrender Dear is a solo album by Peter Brötzmann. Featuring a blend of jazz standards and original compositions and improvisations performed on tenor saxophone, it was recorded during July 16–18, 2018, at the Vienna studio of recording engineer Martin Siewert, and was released in 2019 by Trost Records.

Regarding his decision to record standards, Brötzmann reflected: "Even when I do my wildest shit and my so-called avant-garde nonsense... I want to show, especially the young folks, that it has a relation to the tradition and to the history. I mean, in Europe it's quite easy to forget where the music comes from. It's American music, and the sources and the roots are in the American entertainment industry, and that's one of the points I wanted to make clear."

== Reception ==
Professional ratings
Review scores
Source	Rating
All About Jazz	4/5 stars
DownBeat	4/5 stars
The Free Jazz Collective	4.5/5 stars
Jazzwise	3/5 stars

DownBeat's Howard Mandel wrote: "With respect and evident affection, [Brötzmann] addresses melodies that have stayed in his mind even as he's exploded song form, abandoned chord changes and advanced raw energy in a cri de coeur. Each track is a soliloquy, comprising personal references, investigations and reminiscences... Whatever his affect, Brötzmann transforms breath into sound, providing a measure of peace."

Mark Corroto of All About Jazz stated: "there is something redolent of the past about this session... This is Brötzmann looking back, maybe disclosing the raw materials that made up his oeuvre... Listen and decide if the artist was recording this music for himself or the ghosts of music past."

Writing for Dusted Magazine, Derek Taylor commented: "The material is such a part of his DNA that he simply hoisted his horn and let the pieces pour out without premeditation. That spontaneity is palpable throughout... Nothing gets in the way as cerulean-shaded peals trade with more nuanced, textured purrs. The blues, world-weary and visceral, are a near-constant in the burly, but intimate improvisations, as antique melodies surface and recede around bursts of vibrato-spiked glossolalia."

In a review for Jazzwise, Daniel Spicer noted that the album is "as clear a proof as we've ever seen of just how two-dimensional Brötzmann's reputation as the pugnacious tenor terrorist behind Machine Gun really is. There is much more to him than generally meets the ear."

Colin Green of The Free Jazz Collective remarked: "with the passage of time Brötzmann has internalised these melodies and he sounds like nothing other than Brötzmann. They seem to exist in an indeterminate, largely tempoless realm, repeating and absorbed by themselves as though mulled over in his mind, telling him one thing and responded to with other voices, by turns caressing, elated, desperate; at times no reply at all... Like all great jazzmen Brötzmann mines the inarticulate to give voice to what cannot be said, making palpable what is sensed, for all of us." FJC's Eyal Hareuveni wrote: "freedom for Brötzmann was always about the attitude, the same attitude that inspired Louis Armstrong, Art Blakey, or Don Cherry, and not an academic theory. And Brötzmann's reflections on these standards (and one theme of J.S. Bach) tell a lot of intimate, sincere and tender stories."

== Track listing ==
1. "I Surrender Dear" (Harry Barris, Gordon Clifford) – 4:39
2. "Lover, Come Back to Me" (Sigmund Romberg, Oscar Hammerstein II) – 4:18
3. "Lady Sings the Blues" (Herbie Nichols, Billie Holiday) – 6:05
4. "Con Alma" (Dizzy Gillespie) – 3:23
5. "Nice Work If You Can Get It" (George Gershwin, Ira Gershwin) – 3:18
6. "Dark Blues" (Peter Brötzmann) – 4:54
7. "Improvisation Über ein Thema von J.S. Bach" (Peter Brötzmann) – 1:29
8. "Churchsong" (Peter Brötzmann) – 3:14
9. "Sumphin'" (Sonny Rollins) – 4:39
10. "Brozziman" (Misha Mengelberg) – 3:25
11. "Ballads / Love Poem Nr. 7 / Blues" (Peter Brötzmann) – 10:25
12. "I Surrender Dear" (Harry Barris/Gordon Clifford) – 7:15

== Personnel ==
- Peter Brötzmann – tenor saxophone
