= Misha Mengelberg =

Dutch jazz pianist and composer (1935–2017)

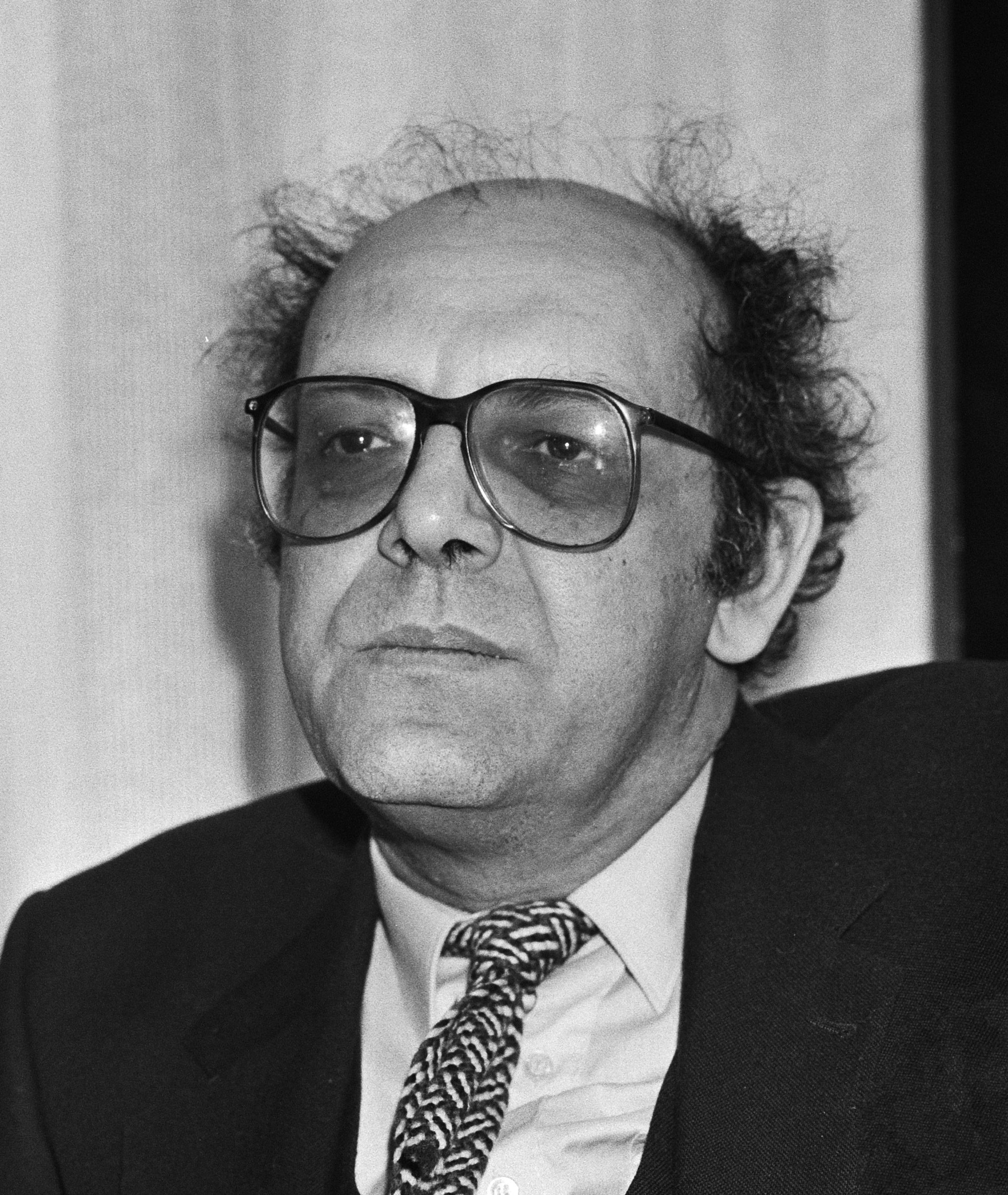
- Mengelberg in 1985

Background information
- Born: Misja Mengelberg; 5 June 1935; Kiev, Ukrainian SSR, USSR
- Died: 3 March 2017 (aged 81) Amsterdam, Netherlands
- Genres: Jazz, Avant-garde jazz, European free jazz, free improvisation
- Occupations: Musician, composer
- Instrument: Piano
- Label: FMP/Free Music Production

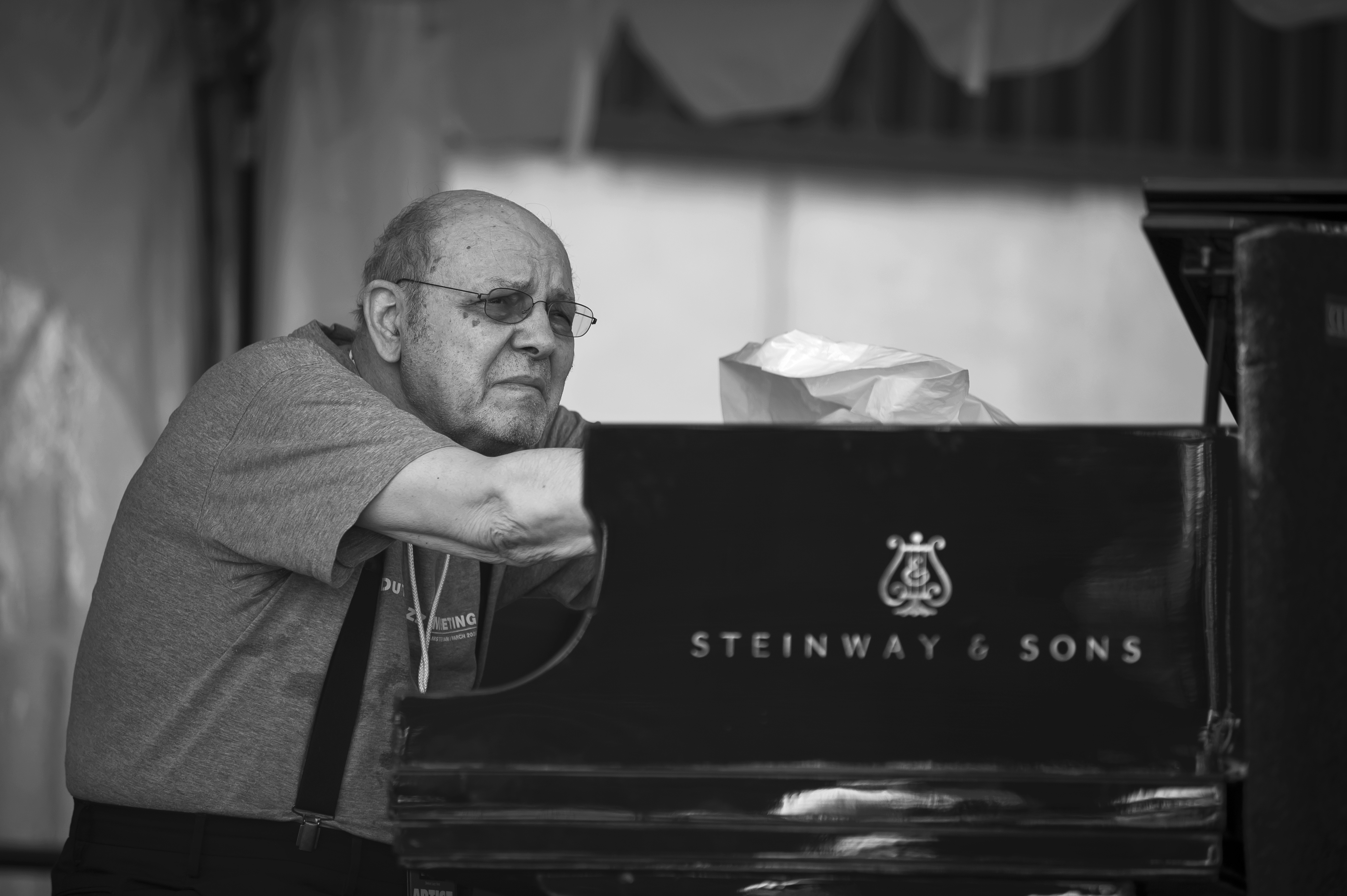
Misha Mengelberg, Detroit International Jazz Festival

Misha Mengelberg (5 June 1935 – 3 March 2017) was a Dutch jazz pianist and composer. A prominent figure in post-WWII European Jazz, Mengelberg is known for his forays into free improvisation, for bringing humor into his music, and as a leading interpreter of songs by fellow pianists Thelonious Monk and Herbie Nichols.

== Biography ==
Mengelberg was born in Kiev, Ukrainian SSR, the son of the Dutch conductor Karel Mengelberg (1902-1984) and grand-nephew of conductor Willem Mengelberg. Karel Mengelberg was a Dutch composer and conductor, who worked in Berlin, Barcelona, Kiev and Amsterdam. A notable work of his was 'Catalunya Renaixent', written for the Banda Municipal of Barcelona in 1934.

Misha's family moved back to the Netherlands in the late 1930s and he began learning the piano at age five. He was considered a chess marvel at age nine. He would continue to compete in chess championships in the 1970s despite his musical career. Mengelberg briefly studied architecture before entering the Royal Conservatory in The Hague, where he studied music from 1958 to 1964. While there he won the first prize at a jazz festival in Loosdrecht and became associated with Fluxus. His early influences included Thelonious Monk, Duke Ellington and John Cage, whom he heard lecture at Darmstadt.

Mengelberg won the Gaudeamus International Composers Award in 1961. Among his first recordings was one of Eric Dolphy's last, Last Date (1964). Also on that record was the drummer Han Bennink, and the two of them, together with saxophonist Piet Noordijk, formed a quartet which had a number of different bassists, and which played at the Newport Jazz Festival in 1966. In 1967 he co-founded the Instant Composers Pool, an organisation which promoted avant garde Dutch jazz performances and recordings, with Bennink and Willem Breuker. He was co-founder of STEIM in Amsterdam in 1969.

Mengelberg played with a large variety of musicians. He often performed in a duo with fellow Dutchman Bennink, with other collaborators including Derek Bailey, Peter Brötzmann, Evan Parker, Anthony Braxton, and (on the flip side of a live recording with Dolphy) his pet parrot. He was also one of the earliest exponents of the work of the once-neglected pianist Herbie Nichols.

He also wrote music for others to perform (generally leaving some room for improvisation) and oversaw a number of music theatre productions, which usually included a large element of absurdist humour. A 2006 DVD release, Afijn (ICP/Data), is a primer on Mengelberg's life and work, containing an 80-minute documentary and additional concert footage.

Mengelberg died in Amsterdam on 3 March 2017, aged 81, from undisclosed causes.

== Discography ==
=== Solo albums ===
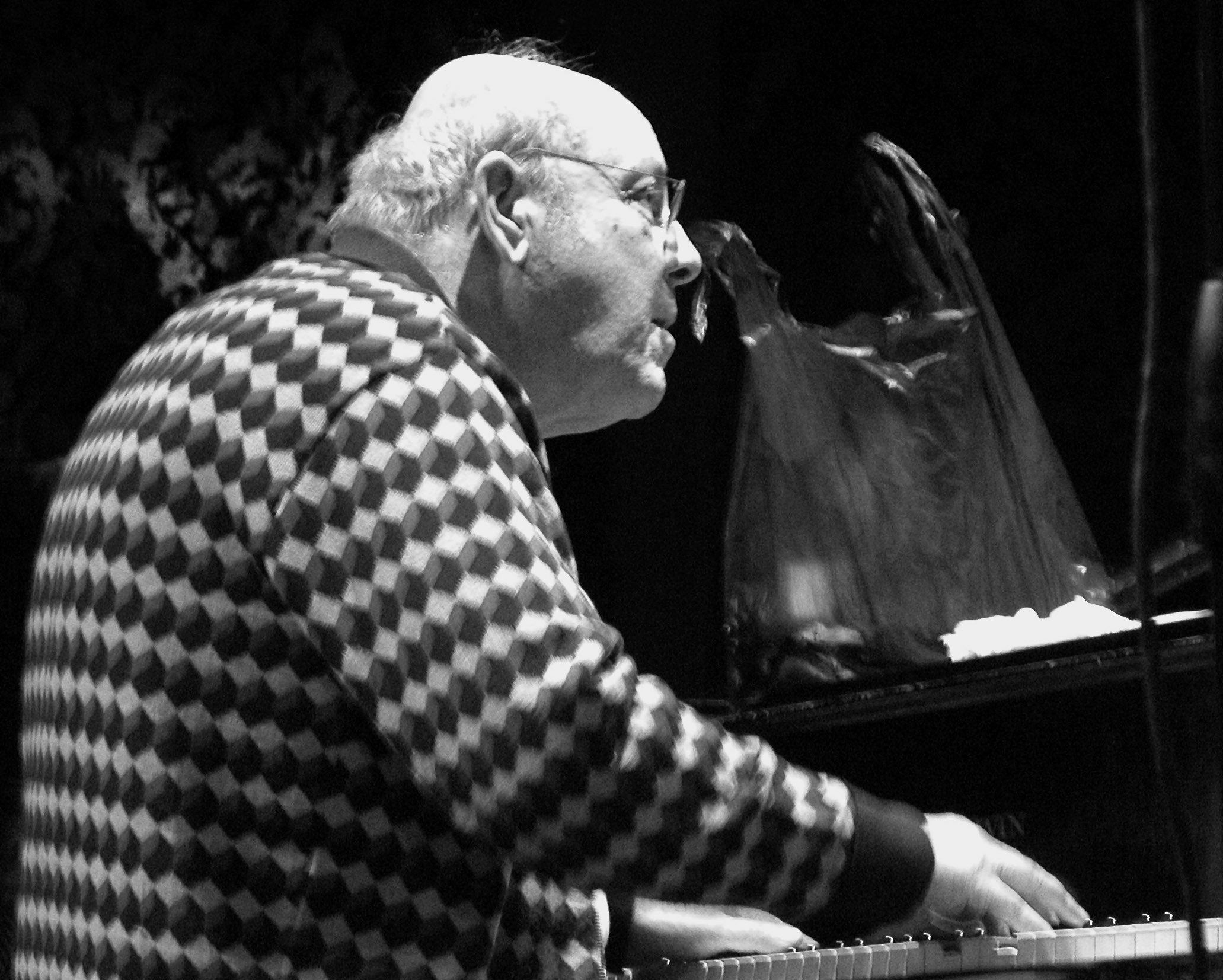
Mengelberg performing in 2004

- 1979: Pech Onderweg (BV Haast)
- 1982: Musica Per 17 Instrumenti / 3 Intermezzi /Omtrent Een Componistenactie Composer's Voice
- 1994: Impromptus (FMP)
- 1994: Mix (Instant Composers Pool)
- 1997: Misha Mengelberg (I Dischi Di Angelica)
- 1999: Two Days in Chicago (hatOLOGY)
- 2000: Solo (Buzz)
- 2005: Senne Sing Song (Tzadik)

=== Collaborations ===
As leader

- 1978: Groupcomposing (Instant Composers Pool), with Peter Brötzmann, Evan Parker, Peter Bennink, Paul Rutherford, Derek Bailey, and Han Bennink
- 1978: Fragments (Instant Composers Pool), with John Tchicai, Han Bennink, and Derek Bailey
- 1985: Change of Season (Music of Herbie Nichols) (Soul Note), with Steve Lacy, George E. Lewis, Arjen Gorter, and Han Bennink
- 1985: On Escalation / 3 Pianopieces / Dialogue / Summer (Attacca), with Peter Schat, Jan Van Vlijmen, and Otto Ketting
- 1991: Dutch Masters (Soul Note), with Steve Lacy, George Lewis, Ernst Reijseger, and Han Bennink
- 1994: Who's Bridge (Avant), with Misha Mengelberg Trio (Brad Jones, Joey Baron)
- 1997: Live in Holland '97 (X-OR), with Mats Gustafsson and Gert-Jan Prins
- 1997: The Root of the Problem (hatOLOGY) Steve Potts, Thomas Heberer, Michel Godard, Achim Kremer
- 1998: No Idea (DIW), with Misha Mengelberg Trio (Greg Cohen, Joey Baron)
- 2001: Four in One (Songlines), with Misha Mengelberg Quartet (Dave Douglas, Brad Jones, Han Bennink)
- 2009: Mill (Conundrom), with Cor Fuhler and Michiel Scheen
- 2011: It Won't Be Called Broken Chair (Psi), with Evan Parker
- 2013: Lucebert / Jazz & Poetry '65 (Uitgeverij Huis Clos), with Misha Mengelberg / Piet Noordijk Kwartet (Han Bennink, Rob Langereis)
- 2014: Nunc! (Nemu), with Dirk Bell, Ryan Carniaux, Gerd Dudek, Joscha Oetz, and Nils Tegen

With Eric Dolphy

- 1964: Last Date (Fontana), live with Jacques Schols and Han Bennink
- 1974: Playing: Epistrophy, 1 June 1964 In Eindhoven, Holland (Instant Composers Pool), including Schols and Bennink

With Han Bennink

- 1968: Instant Composers Pool (Instant Composers Pool), with John Tchicai
- 1971: Instant Composers Pool 010 (Instant Composers Pool)
- 1972: Een Mirakelse Tocht Door Het Scharrebroekse no. 1-6 (Instant Composers Pool)
- 1974: EinePartieTischtennis (FMP, Instant Composers Pool), live
- 1975: Coincidents (Stichting ICP Geluidsdragers, Instant Composers Pool)
- 1978: Midwoud 77 (Instant Composers Pool)
- 1979: A European Proposal (Live in Cremona) (Horo), with Paul Rutherford and Mario Schiano
- 1982: Bennink Mengelberg (Instant Composers Pool)
- 1998: MiHa (Instant Composers Pool)
- 2004: Senne Sing Song (Tzadik)

With Louis Andriessen

- 1969: Reconstructie (STEIM), with Hugo Claus, Reinbert de Leeuw, Harry Mulisch, Peter Schat and Jan van Vlijmen

With ICP Orchestra

- 1979: Live in Soncino (Instant Composers Pool, AD LIB)
- 1982: Japan Japon (Instant Composers Pool)
- 1984: Extension Red, White & Blue (Instant Composers Pool)
- 1987: Two Programs: Performs Herbie Nichols and Thelonious Monk (Instant Composers Pool)
- 1990: Bospaadje Konijnehol I (Instant Composers Pool)
- 1991: Bospaadje Konijnehol II (Instant Composers Pool)
- 1997: The Instant Composers Pool 30 Years (Instant Composers Pool)
- 1999: Jubilee Varia (hatOLOGY)
- 2001: Oh, My Dog (Instant Composers Pool)
- 2004: Aan & Uit (Instant Composers Pool)
- 2006: Weer Is Een Dag Voorbij (Instant Composers Pool)
- 2009: Live at the Bimhuis (Instant Composers Pool)
- 2010: !ICP! 50 (Instant Composers Pool)
- 2010: ICP Orchestra (Instant Composers Pool)
- 2015: Misha Enzovoort (Instant Composers Pool)

With Anthony Braxton

- Anthony Braxton's Charlie Parker Project 1993 (HatART, 1993 [1995])

With Peter Brötzmann

- 1979: 3 Points and a Mountain (FMP), with Han Bennink

With Dudu Pukwana

- 1979: Yi Yole (Instant Composers Pool), with Han Bennink

With Keshavan Maslak

- 1980: Humanplexity (Leo), with Han Bennink

With Roswell Rudd

- 1983: Regeneration (Soul Note), with Steve Lacy, Kent Carter, and Han Bennink

With Pino Minafra

- 1987: Tropic of the Mounted Sea Chicken (Splasc(H)), with Michele Lomuto, Han Bennink, and Unknown Artist

With Franz Koglmann

- 1991: L'Heure Bleue (HatART)

With Steve Lacy

- 1996: Five Facings (FMP), with Marilyn Crispell, Ulrich Gumpert, Fred Van Hove, Vladimir Miller

With Yuri Honing

- 1998: Playing (Jazz in Motion)
- 2000: Lively (Buzz), with Ernst Reijseger

With Paul Termos

- 2003: Termos Sessions Volume I (X-OR, Bimhuis)

With Benjamin Herman

- 2004: Heterogenity (X-OR, Bimhuis), featuring Bert Joris

With Alessandra Patrucco

- 2006: Circus (Instant Composers Pool), with Tristan Honsinger, Ab Baars, and Han Bennink

With Frank Gratkowski

- 2006: Frank Gratkowski Vis-à-vis Misha Mengelberg (Leo)

With Ab Baars and Ig Henneman

- 2009: Sliptong (Wig 16) 2009,

With Berlin Contemporary Jazz Orchestra

- Berlin Contemporary Jazz Orchestra (ECM, 1990)
