= Open Secrets (album) =

Studio album by Peter Kowald
- Released: 1988
- Recorded: January 1988
- Studio: FMP Studio, Berlin
- Genre: Free jazz
- Label: FMP; FMP 1190; FMP CD 132
- Producer: Jost Gebers

Open Secrets is a solo bass album by Peter Kowald. It was recorded in January 1988 at the FMP Studio in Berlin, and was released on LP later that year by the FMP label. FMP reissued the album on CD in 2008.

== Reception ==
Professional ratings
Review scores
Source	Rating
The Penguin Guide to Jazz	3/4 stars
All About Jazz	4/5 stars

The authors of the Penguin Guide to Jazz Recordings called the album "a remarkable record," noting that it "makes a steady progress through areas that sound predetermined but which are encountered according to chance-driven logic that throws up challenging transitions and juxtapositions." In a review for All About Jazz, Nic Jones stated that the album "presents the sound of a formidable technician without letting that dubious asset get in the way of musical expression. The results are compelling."

Writing for Point of Departure, Francesco Martinelli described the album as an "exceptional snapshot of [Kowald's] life and art," and commented: "There are so many different things going on on this recording that time flashes by and at the end one cannot wait to hear it again." Bill Meyer of Dusted Magazine wrote: "this record's nine tracks are marvelously focused, the musical ideas succinctly articulated, the soul behind them ever evident." In an article for Paris Transatlantic, Clifford Allen remarked: "Each of these vignettes contains a heavy dose of personality, and you can hear Kowald the human being throughout."

== Track listing ==
All compositions by Peter Kowald.

=== Side A ===
1. "Peek At World" – 6:01
2. "Languages Differentes" – 5:18
3. "Vita Povera - Arte No" – 2:36
4. "El Mismo Rio" – 4:18
5. "Welt Um (Wale)" – 1:18

=== Side B ===
1. "Open Secrets" – 8:35
2. "Watu Wote" – 6:34
3. "Archaion Mellon" – 3:05
4. "Ima Samu Dessu (Mi Tsu Ni)" – 2:35

== Personnel ==
- Peter Kowald – bass
