= For Adolphe Sax =

Studio album by the Peter Brötzmann Trio
- Released: 1967
- Recorded: June – September 1967
- Genre: Jazz
- Label: Brö

Peter Brötzmann chronology
For Adolphe Sax (1967)	Machine Gun (1968)

For Adolphe Sax is the debut album by free jazz saxophonist Peter Brötzmann. It was initially released on Brötzmann's Brö label in 1967, and was reissued on LP by FMP in 1972. In 2002, it was reissued, with an additional track, on CD by the Atavistic label, and in 2014, the original three tracks were reissued on CD by Cien Fuegos Records.

Adolphe Sax was the inventor of many instruments, including the first saxophones.

When asked about the album in a 2019 interview for It's Psychedelic Baby! Magazine, Brötzmann commented: "There was no label interested but our audience was growing and of course I was convinced that people should listen to what we had to say. From Karl Marx we had learned that the worker shouldn't give the tool and product out of his hand and so I started my own company which turned out to be a little successful, which means I didn't lose money and we were able to spread out the music over the (western) world."

== Reception ==
Professional ratings
Review scores
Source	Rating
AllMusic	4/5 stars
The Penguin Guide to Jazz	3.5/4 stars

In a review for AllMusic, William York wrote: "this is intense, unrelenting free jazz with little in the way of clear structure or melody. Brötzmann is credited with all three compositions on the album, but it is hard to imagine them being much more than very rough sketches. Whatever the case, this is music that gets by on force and pure energy rather than polite tunes or other musical decorum. Apart from a few brief moments of quiet during 'Sanity'... this stuff just doesn't quit, with Brötzmann's consistently abrasive, high-pitched wailing leading the charge and the other two members stirring up a pretty good ruckus themselves... It may compel some to simply turn off the stereo, but the fact that this music is likely to provoke such intense reactions (pro or con) more than 35 years after its release is remarkable on its own."

The authors of The Penguin Guide to Jazz awarded the album 3½ stars, and commented: "[Brötzmann] was playing free jazz in the early '60s and by the time of this astounding album... was a stylist whose intensity and sureness of focus were already established. The huge, screaming sound he makes is among the most exhilarating things in the music... the only precedents for his early work are to be found in the contemporary records of Albert Ayler, although Brötzmann arrived at his methods independently of the American. His first trio record is of a similar cast to, say, Ayler's Spiritual Unity — a raw, ferocious three-way assault, and... it underlines how far Brötzmann had already come with his ideas and execution."

In a 2002 review of the Atavistic reissue for All About Jazz, Derek Taylor commented: "Revisiting these sounds now aged over three decades (but every bit as relevant) public rancor and disdain may seem understandable given the canonical forces that still guide some strains of improvised music, but hardly deserved." He noted that the second and third tracks "demonstrate a layered use of dynamics and even silence in a way that runs directly in the face of those detractors who claimed (and continue to claim) that the German is all about full frontal assault at the expense of subterfuge and subtlety."

An article at Mats Gustafsson's Discaholic Corner site states: "This is simply just beautiful music — full of high energy freee jazz blowing of the highest possible quality, with a very very unique interaction between the three players — this beast will BLOW you away... The music is... ACTIVE, in a way... that just makes this record a CLASSIC and something that everyone neeeeeeds to hear in order to fight the stupidity back."

== Track listing ==
1. "For Adolphe Sax" - 19:19
2. "Sanity" - 4:49
3. "Morning Glory" - 16:17
4. "Everything" - 9:55 (previously unissued bonus track on Atavistic CD reissue)

Tracks 1–3 recorded in June 1967; track 4 recorded in September 1967.

== Personnel ==
- Peter Brötzmann – tenor and baritone saxophones
- Peter Kowald – bass
- Sven-Åke Johansson – drums
- Fred Van Hove – piano on "Everything"
