= Schwarzwaldfahrt =

Studio album by Peter Brötzmann and Han Bennink
- Released: 1977
- Recorded: May 9–11, 1977
- Studio: Open air of the Black Forest, Baden-Wuerttemberg, Germany
- Genre: Free improvisation
- Label: FMP; 0440

Schwarzwaldfahrt ("A Trip Through the Black Forest") is an album by saxophonist Peter Brötzmann and percussionist Han Bennink. It was recorded during May 9–11, 1977, in the open air of the Black Forest in Baden-Wuerttemberg, Germany, using a Stellavox tape recorder, and was initially released on vinyl later that year by the FMP label. In 2005, Atavistic Records reissued the album on CD as part of their Unheard Music Series, with previously unreleased tracks. The album was reissued on vinyl in 2012 by the Cien Fuegos imprint of Trost Records, and, in 2022, Trost reissued it again in limited quantities, accompanied by a 120-page book containing photos and an essay by novelist David Keenan.

On the album, the musicians are credited with performing on "instruments" such as wood, trees, sand, land, water, and air. Nearly 30 years later, Brötzmann reflected: "We didn't have any big message in our heads, but we just did it for the excitement of being there. We played on trees and in the water and with the birds and wind. We used what we had and what we found, and with all of that we made some music, which is in a way the real meaning of improvising. To work with what you have."

== Reception ==
Professional ratings
Review scores
Source	Rating
AllMusic	3/5 stars
The Penguin Guide to Jazz Recordings	3/4 stars
Record Collector	4/5 stars
Tom Hull – on the Web	B

In a review of the Atavistic reissue for All About Jazz, Clifford Allen wrote: "Certainly there's the sheer joy of making music unencumbered outside... There's also the power of recording what could be akin to the first human music... Audio-collage it might be, but the fact that one can visualize and share in the experience of making it, is what makes Schwarzwaldfahrt such a unique document in the history of creative music." In a separate review for Paris Transatlantic, Allen commented: "In its primal and very human way, Schwarzwaldfahrt is the highest form of conversation: conversation between two men, and man and nature. In the depths of the Black Forest that day, Peter Brötzmann and Han Bennink found music."

The Free Jazz Collective's Eyal Hareuveni called the album "iconic and seminal," and stated: "Schwarzwaldfahrt is a great album, and still radiates an inspiring urgency and a unique sense of rare musical bond and resourceful invention. Brötzmann and Bennink play in a totally free and playful mode... A timeless treasure."

Spencer Grady of Record Collector remarked: "These two forest freaks plainly had a ball... In conversing with their own Sylvania, Brötzmann and Bennink became totally inspired by it – it's a reciprocal arrangement (the fauna react too) imbued with a sense of fun that's as palpable as it is infectious."

Writing for The New York City Jazz Record, Kurt Gottschalk stated that the music is "filled with adventure," and noted: "There's a sense that, perhaps more than ever for the impromptu wilderness troubadours, anything was good to go. There are reed duets, percussion jams and scavenged marimbas. There are also natural sounds and a huge sense of audio space. It's not a noisy record. It's actually abstractly sublime."

The Wire's Daniel Spicer commented: "Let loose in this environment, Brötzmann and Bennink explore their surroundings with a childlike sense of wonder and inquisitive mischief... Here, the act of becoming lost in the woods is a way of entering a kind of shamanic consciousness... To play there is to step outside of time and exist in an exquisite cosmic present."

In an article for Cadence, Carl Brauer wrote: "On '#10' the two are heard splashing in the water – just like two kids playing in the bath tub. So it was not altogether unexpected when I played this track for a second time that my 20 month old son suddenly came running into the living room, said 'rain', went over to a speaker, looked behind it, and then sat down a foot in front of it, transfixed, laughing with delight. He loved it."

== Track listing ==
All music by Peter Brötzmann and Han Bennink.

Original vinyl release

1. "Aufen Nr. 1" – 5:55
2. "Aufen Nr. 2" – 2:24
3. "Aufen Nr. 3" – 6:13
4. "Aufen Nr. 4" – 6:20
5. "Aufen Nr. 5" – 0:33
6. "Schwarzenbachtalsperre Nr. 6" – 2:43
7. "Schwarzenbachtalsperre Nr. 7" – 8:17
8. "Schwarzenbachtalsperre Nr. 8" – 1:39
9. "Schwarzenbachtalsperre Nr. 9" – 3:50
10. "Schwarzenbachtalsperre Nr. 10" – 4:44

Additional tracks on Atavistic CD reissue

1. "Nr. 11" – 7:36
2. "Nr. 12" – 1:22
3. "Nr. 13" – 5:44
4. "Nr. 14" – 12:19
5. "Nr. 15" – 5:18
6. "Nr. 16" – 1:35
7. "Nr. 17" – 2:11
8. "Nr. 18" – 6:57
9. "Nr. 19" – 8:30
10. "Nr. 20" – 8:04
11. "Untitled" – 2:43
12. "Untitled" – 2:05

== Personnel ==
- Peter Brötzmann and Han Bennink – E♭ clarinet, B♭ clarinet, bass clarinet, soprano saxophone, alto saxophone, birdcalls, viola, banjo, cymbal, wood, trees, sand, land, water, air
