= Was Da Ist =

Studio album by Peter Kowald
- Released: 1995
- Recorded: Summer 1994
- Studio: Artcore Studio, Wuppertal
- Genre: Free jazz
- Length: 72:11
- Label: FMP 062
- Producer: Jost Gebers

Peter Kowald chronology
Tracks (1993)	Was Da Ist (1995)	Nil (1995)

Was Da Ist is a solo album by German free jazz bassist Peter Kowald which was recorded in Germany in 1994 for the FMP label.

== Reception ==
Professional ratings
Review scores
Source	Rating
AllMusic	4/5 stars
Penguin Guide to Jazz	👑

AllMusic awarded the album 4 stars, and reviewer William York stated: "Kowald is less concerned with developing ideas in a conventional manner than he is on narrowing his sights intently on one specific idea and moving on to the next piece once he's done examining it. His intense concentration keeps the music focused and creates a hypnotic sort of feel in several spots, but it requires equal concentration on the part of the listener... Was Da Ist is a highly personal album that will reward those who can penetrate its somewhat forbidding exterior."

The authors of the Penguin Guide to Jazz Recordings awarded the album a maximum four-star rating, plus a "Crown" signifying a recording that the authors "feel a special admiration or affection for." They commented: "This is music of the very highest order, technically adroit, emotionally and intellectually concentrated, and beautifully recorded... A record to savour and ponder; a record to return to, as often as time allows."

== Track listing ==
All compositions by Peter Kowald.

1. "Part 1" – 0:50
2. "Part 2" – 2:34
3. "Part 3" – 5:01
4. "Part 4" – 2:04
5. "Part 5" – 1:25
6. "Part 6" – 3:25
7. "Part 7" – 2:32
8. "Part 8" – 5:43
9. "Part 9" – 2:13
10. "Part 10" – 6:38
11. "Part 11" – 3:40
12. "Part 12" – 1:06
13. "Part 13" – 1:32
14. "Part 14" – 2:32
15. "Part 15" – 4:49
16. "Part 16" – 2:30
17. "Part 17" – 1:36
18. "Part 18" – 4:09
19. "Part 19" – 3:06
20. "Part 20" – 3:35
21. "Part 21" – 2:47
22. "Part 22" – 3:49
23. "Part 23" – 4:35

== Personnel ==
- Peter Kowald – bass
