= Machine Gun (Peter Brötzmann album) =

Studio album by the Peter Brötzmann Octet
- Released: 1968
- Recorded: May 1968
- Genre: European free jazz
- Length: 36:55
- Label: BRÖ
- Producer: Peter Brötzmann

Peter Brötzmann chronology
| For Adolphe Sax (1967) | Machine Gun (1968) | Nipples (1969) |

Machine Gun is the second album by German avant-garde jazz saxophonist Peter Brötzmann, originally released on his BRÖ label in 1968.

It was later reissued on the FMP label in 1971. In 1990, FMP issued the album on CD, adding two previously unreleased alternate takes. In 2007, Atavistic Records reissued the album again as The Complete Machine Gun Sessions, adding the only live recording of the title piece (previously issued on the Fuck de Boere CD). In 2011 the label Slowboy reissued the first studio take again on vinyl in tip-on style cover with three color silkscreen.

== Background ==
According to Brötzmann, "Machine Gun" was a nickname given to him by Don Cherry, and refers to Brötzmann's playing style, "but of course it was happening in '68 it had straight connection to the war in Vietnam and things like that. Yeah, I know [Jimi] Hendrix used the title a couple of years later."

Brötzmann stated that one of the inspirations for the album's unusual instrumentation was a concert by the Lionel Hampton big band "with a beautiful hardcore tenor saxophone frontline playing 'Flying Home'," after which Brötzmann gathered available tenor players for the recording session. Saxophonist Gerd Dudek was invited to participate, but was unable to attend. (He appeared on The Complete Machine Gun Sessions.)

Regarding the music, Brötzmann stated: "We were all quite new to each other. Evan Parker could play 'Giant Steps,' which was very impressive. But he heard what I was playing and was surprised by the sound I could make...I had to find a way to organize the most freedom possible, but to give some structure to hold onto." He reflected: "I got some paper and wrote and drew some things. It's a very conventional, simply structured piece... It's a Charles Ives thing: solo, solo background, solo."

Looking back on the album after fifty years, Brötzmann recalled his hopes and optimistic outlook: "We can make changes to the system. We can reach single souls. We can open up their horizons... But the vision was bigger than the reality. Reality and capitalism are stronger than anything."

== Reception ==
Professional ratings
Review scores
| Source | Rating |
|---|---|
| All About Jazz | 3.5/5 stars |
| AllMusic | 5/5 stars |
| Encyclopedia of Popular Music | 5/5 stars |
| MusicHound Jazz | 5/5 |
| The Penguin Guide to Jazz | 4/4 stars |
| Sputnikmusic | 5/5 stars |

The authors of The Penguin Guide to Jazz awarded the release four out of four stars plus a special "crown" accolade, and placed it in its "core collection" of jazz albums. They called the album "one of the most significant documents of the European free-jazz underground," praising its "fearsome power," and commenting: "The three saxophonists fire off a ceaseless round of blasting, overblown noise, built on the continuous crescendo managed by Bennink and Johansson and, as chaotic as it sounds, the music is informed by an iron purpose and control... Whenever we return to it, the power of this amazing record seems as potent as ever."

Joslyn Layne, writing for AllMusic, referred to the album as "a heavy-impact sonic assault so aggressive it still knocks listeners back on their heels decades later," and remarked: "While Brötzmann has played this powerfully on albums since, never again is it with a group of this size playing just as hard with him. The players declare and exercise their right to bellow and wail all they want; they both send up the stereotype of free playing as simply screaming, and unapologetically revel in it. The sound of Machine Gun is just as aggressive and battering as its namesake, blowing apart all that's timid, immovable, or proper with an unrepentant and furious finality. The years have not managed to temper this fiery furnace blast from hell; it's just as relentless and shocking an assault now as it was then. Even stout-hearted listeners will nearly be sent into hiding -- much like standing outside during a violent storm, withstanding this kind of fierce energy is a primal thrill."

Thom Jurek, in an AllMusic review of The Complete Machine Gun Sessions, stated that the music "peels paint with its sheer power, and will no doubt startle anyone who hasn't heard it before," and wrote: "Machine Gun offers a portrait in sheer joy, that all is not lost and that something, perhaps everything, could be changed... The communication that exists here, and the stop-on-a-dime turnarounds and changes that take place, reveal that this is no ordinary blowing session. Something very extraordinary is taking place in these selections, the moment is being seized, and what exists is an entire musical universe that has abandon and a kind of optimism not often heard in free music. There is no artsy pretension, but the sense of real freedom, of going for it, wherever it happens to be. It's an ugly beauty that will make you laugh your ass off even as it blows your hair back. The louder you listen, the more that sense of laughter increases. It is subversive because it is only concerned with discovery. This one can't be recommended highly enough because its legend has stood the test of time, making it a true classic."

In an article for DownBeat, Andrew Jones noted that "Machine Gun's 45-second intro forms one of jazz's most distinctive mission statements," and commented: "In part, the octet achieved its sound by marshaling the expressive possibilities represented by the blues. While [John] Cage and the European avant-garde made Machine Gun possible, its content owes more to the hot jazz of Louis Armstrong than the obscure theory emanating from academia at the time. Ultimately, Machine Gun is the blues for a continent ravaged by a century of internecine warfare, unfathomable crimes against humanity and an uncertain future... [its] legacy continues not just as a result of its considerable accomplishments, but because of the volatile period it reflects and refracts, a time when people waited impatiently for an artistic gesture powerful enough to change everything and prevent history from repeating itself."

Troy Collins, writing for All About Jazz, called the album "essential," and stated: "Machine Gun provided a blueprint for such riotous ensembles as Last Exit, Naked City and Massacre. Brötzmann's assaultive 1968 octet recording set a precedent for all extreme improvised music that followed in its wake." He concluded: "Conceiving brief melodies of an almost accessible nature one moment, only to savagely rend them to pieces in the next, the octet offers a revolutionary stance in their execution and intent. Still challenging after almost forty years, Machine Gun stands tall as a high water mark of European free jazz."

In an essay for The Guardian, John Fordham called Machine Gun "a trailblazing piece of free jazz," and wrote that, at the time of the album's release, "many thought this it was simply a wall of noise. But as perceptions changed, the bass clarinet/percussion battles between Breuker and Bennink, the explicit eloquence of a young Evan Parker, the emergence of themes with free-jazz, South African and R&B connections, and the many other fast-shifting conversations between the performers, have come to be recognised in all their influential diversity."

An article at Mats Gustafsson's Discaholic Corner site states: "The record that defines it ALL!... The music that Brötzmann and his comrades were doing in combination with the raw, raaaaaaaaw sounds of the recording and the visuals of the cover made this the ULTIMATE classic of European free jazz!... The interaction between the eight players are wild and full of energy in all directions... Legendary and for always the BOMB!"

== Track listing ==
=== Original release ===
Side One
| No. | Title | Writer(s) | Length |
|---|---|---|---|
| 1. | "Machine Gun" | Peter Brötzmann | 17:16 |
| Total length: | | | 17:16 |

Side Two
| No. | Title | Writer(s) | Length |
|---|---|---|---|
| 2. | "Responsible (For Jan van de Ven)" | Fred Van Hove | 8:17 |
| 3. | "Music for Han Bennink" | Willem Breuker | 11:22 |
| Total length: | | | 19:39 (36:55) |

=== Re-release (1991) ===
| No. | Title | Writer(s) | Length |
|---|---|---|---|
| 1. | "Machine Gun (Second Take)" | Brötzmann | 14:57 |
| 2. | "Machine Gun (Third Take)" | Brötzmann | 17:13 |
| 3. | "Responsible (For Jan van de Ven) (First Take)" | Van Hove | 10:00 |
| 4. | "Responsible (For Jan van de Ven) (Second Take)" | Van Hove | 8:12 |
| 5. | "Music for Han Bennink" | Breuker | 11:22 |

Note that the original release contained "Machine Gun" (Third Take) and "Responsible (For Jan van de Ven)" (Second Take).

=== The Complete Machine Gun Sessions (2007) ===
| No. | Title | Writer(s) | Length |
|---|---|---|---|
| 1. | "Machine Gun" | Brötzmann | 17:19 |
| 2. | "Responsible (For Jan van de Ven)" | Fred Van Hove | 8:20 |
| 3. | "Music for Han Bennink" | Willem Breuker | 11:29 |
| 4. | "Machine Gun (Second Take)" | Brötzmann | 15:01 |
| 5. | "Responsible (For Jan van de Ven) (First Take)" | Van Hove | 10:08 |
| 6. | "Machine Gun Live" (March 24, 1968 at Frankfurt Jazz Festival) | Brötzmann | 17:40 |

== Personnel ==
- Peter Brötzmann – tenor and baritone saxophones, producer
- Willem Breuker – tenor saxophone and bass clarinet
- Evan Parker – tenor saxophone
- Fred Van Hove – piano
- Peter Kowald – bass
- Buschi Niebergall – bass
- Sven-Åke Johansson – drums
- Han Bennink – drums
- Gerd Dudek – tenor saxophone ("Machine Gun Live")

Production

- Günther Zipelius – recording engineer
- Jost Gebers – 1991 reissue producer
- John Corbett – 2007 reissue producer
