= Lost & Found (Peter Brötzmann album) =

Live album by Peter Brötzmann
- Released: 2009
- Recorded: July 14, 2006
- Venue: Nickelsdorfer Konfrontationen, Nickelsdorf, Austria
- Genre: Free jazz
- Length: 47:10
- Label: FMP; CD 134
- Producer: Peter Brötzmann, Jost Gebers

Peter Brötzmann chronology
Noise of Wings (2009)	Lost & Found (2009)	Brøtzmann / Drake (2010)

Lost & Found is a live solo album by saxophonist Peter Brötzmann. It was recorded on July 14, 2006, at Kampenjazz in Nickelsdorfer Konfrontationen in Nickelsdorf, Austria, and was released in 2009 by the FMP label.

== Reception ==
Professional ratings
Review scores
Source	Rating
All About Jazz	4.5/5 stars
All About Jazz	3.5/5 stars
AllMusic	4.5/5 stars
The Free Jazz Collective	4/5 stars

A reviewer for AllMusic wrote: "Brötzmann is remarkably adept at spontaneous invention and textural variation. Listeners should feel free to surrender completely to the wonderment of the coiled helix of successive moments that make up this 47-minute recital."

Nic Jones of All About Jazz commented: "There's the same light and shade to be heard here as there is elsewhere, but here the animated passages conjure up only the man's own past, as if the fire hasn't so much dimmed as merely changed the color of its flames. The blast is, however, just as invigorating as it's always been." AAJ's Mark Corroto called the album "magnificent," and noted that Brötzmann's "live recordings are probably the best at capturing the essence of this great man's passion; and further, hearing him without accompaniment is a direct line into his thoughts."

Writing for The Free Jazz Collective, Stef Gijssels stated that the album is "sensitive at times, not sweet, but an acceptance of smallness, of someone alone in empty space, the opposite of the unrelenting blowing with his bands that leaves no second of chance to silence... He can not only shout, he can weep too."

In a review for Point of Departure, Bill Shoemaker remarked: "Peter Brötzmann's music isn't mellowing with age. The walls still tumble down when the saxophonist is at full bore... But, it can be said that Brötzmann's music is ripening."

Derek Taylor of Dusted Magazine wrote: "While Brötzmann has always been absent of artistic artifice and uncompromising in his insistence on emotive expression, his solo projects have opened avenues to experiment in more oblique areas... Lost & Found returns focus to the sort of hard-nosed blowing he does best while still leaving space for several 'out-of-character' surprises."

Paris Transatlantic's Nate Dorward described the album as "wonderfully human music, at times forbiddingly obsessive in its musical fixations while at others... verging on total distractability," and noted that "Brötzmann's throaty sound conveys an emotional range rarely touched on in jazz of any kind, from the downcast to the sluggish to the outraged."

== Track listing ==
Composed by Peter Brötzmann.

1. "Internal Rotation" – 15:15
2. "Lost & Found" – 12:37
3. "Universal Madness" – 7:25
4. "...Got a Hole in It" – 8:34
5. "Turmoil" – 3:21

== Personnel ==
- Peter Brötzmann – tenor saxophone, alto saxophone, B♭ clarinet, tárogató
