= Peter Kowald =

German double bassist and tubist

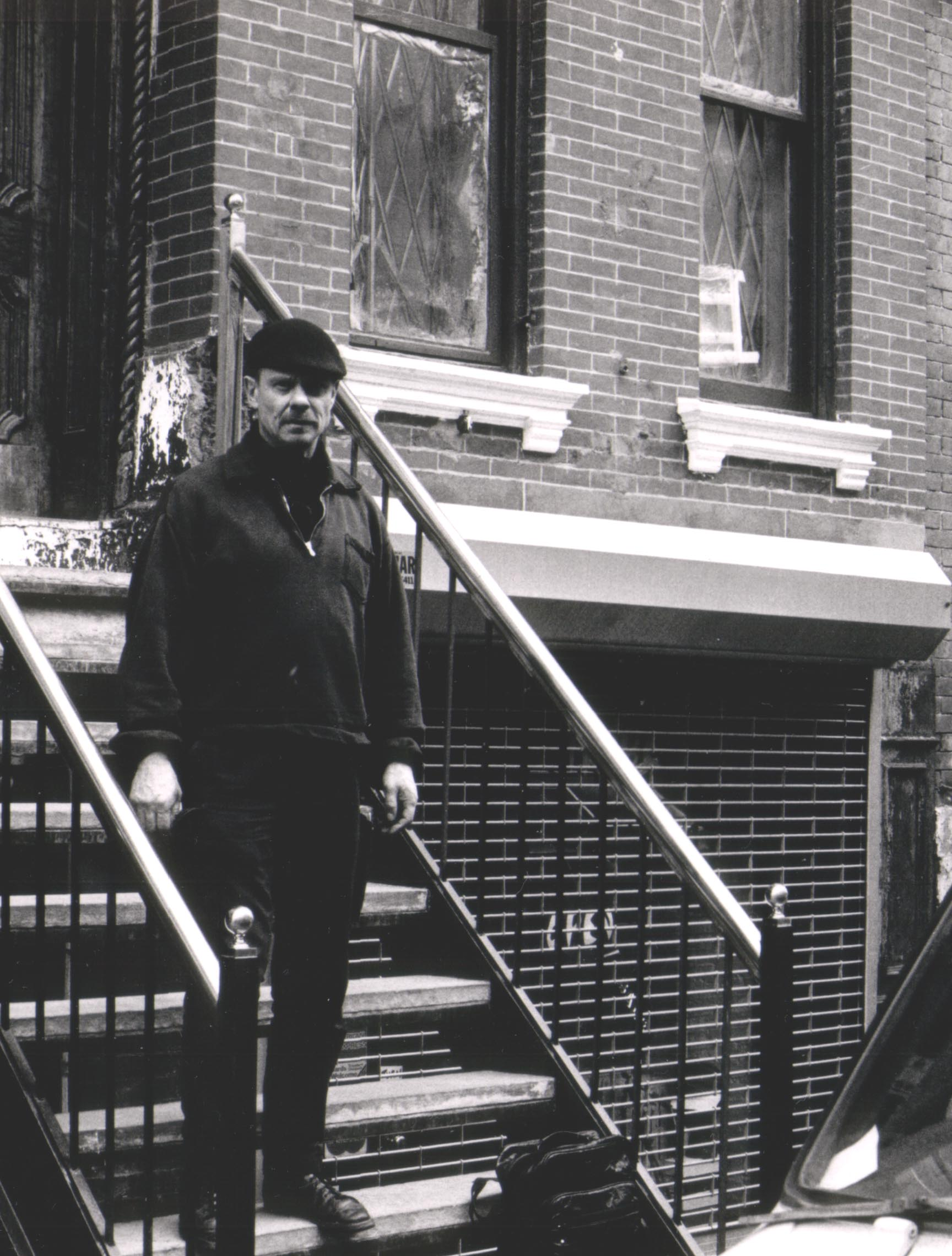
- Peter Kowald in New York in 1985

Background information
- Born: 21 April 1944; Meiningen, Germany
- Died: 21 September 2002 (aged 58) New York City
- Genres: Free jazz, Free improvisation
- Occupation: Musician
- Instruments: double bass, tuba
- Years active: 1960s–2000
- Formerly of: Globe Unity Orchestra, Peter Brotzman

Peter Kowald (21 April 1944 – 21 September 2002) was a German free jazz and free improvising double bassist and tubist.

== Career ==
A member of the Globe Unity Orchestra, and a touring double-bass player, Kowald collaborated with many European free jazz and American free-jazz players during his career, including Peter Brötzmann, Irène Schweizer, Karl Berger, Fred Anderson, Hamid Drake, Karl E. H. Seigfried, Conny Bauer, Jeffrey Morgan, Wadada Leo Smith, Günter Sommer, William Parker, Barre Phillips, Joëlle Léandre, Alfred Harth, Lauren Newton and Evan Parker. He also recorded a number of solo double-bass albums, and was a member of the London Jazz Composer's Orchestra until 1985. He also recorded a number of pioneering double bass duets with Maarten Altena, Barry Guy, Joëlle Léandre, Barre Phillips, William Parker, Damon Smith and Peter Jacquemyn.

In addition, Kowald collaborated extensively with poets and artists and with the dancers Gerlinde Lambeck, Anne Martin (formerly of Pina Bausch Ensemble), Tadashi Endo, Patricia Parker (founder of the Vision Festival), Maria Mitchell, Sally Silvers, Cheryl Banks (formerly of Sun Ra's Arkestra), Arnette de Mille, Sayonara Pereira, and Kazuo Ohno. Specific works included Die Klage der Kaiserin (1989) with Pina Bausch, short pieces (since 1989) with Jean Sasportes, The spirit of adventure (1990) with Anastasia Lyra, Wasser in der Hand (1990/91) with Christine Brunel, and Futan no sentaku/The burden of choice (1990/91) with Min Tanaka and Butch Morris.

Besides his duo work with singers such as Jeanne Lee, Diamanda Galás, Anna Homler or Sainkho Namtchylak, Peter was especially interested in his international improvising ensemble Global Village with musicians from different cultural regions of the world: China, Japan, Near East, South Europe, North and South America.

He died of a heart attack in New York City in 2002.

== Discography ==
=== As leader or co-leader ===
- Die Jungen: Random Generators (FMP, 1979) with Barre Phillips
- Touch the Earth (FMP, 1980) with Leo Smith and Günter Sommer
- Two Making a Triangle (FMP, 1982) with Maarten Altena
- If You Want the Kernels You Have to Break the Shells (FMP, 1982) with Leo Smith and Günter Sommer
- Paintings (FMP, 1982) with Barry Guy
- Open Secrets (FMP, 1988)
- Duos: Europa · America · Japan (FMP, 1984–89)
- Duos 2 (FMP, 1986–90)
- When The Sun Is Out You Don't See Stars (FMP, 1992) with Werner Lüdi, Butch Morris and Sainkho Namtchylak
- Was Da Ist (FMP, 1994)
- Cuts (FMP, 1995) with Ort Ensemble Wuppertal, Evan Parker, Lê Quan Ninh and Carlos Zingaro
- Bass Duets (FMP, 1979–82) – compilation
- Mirror – Broken But no Dust (Balance Point Acoustics, 2000)
- Silence & Flies: Live at Nigglmuhle (Free Elephant, 2001)
- Deals, Ideas & Ideals (Hopscotch, 2001) with Rashied Ali and Assif Tsahar
- Between Heaven and Earth (Intakt, 2003) with Conrad Bauer and Günter Sommer
- The Victoriaville Tape (Free Elephant, 2003)
- Deep Music (Free Elephant, 2004)
- Global Village (Free Elephant, 2004)
- Aria (Free Elephant, 2005)
- Live at Kassiopeia (NoBusiness, 2011) with Julius Hemphill

=== As sideman ===
- 1966: Alexander Schlippenbach: Globe Unity
- 1967: Peter Brotzmann: For Adolphe Sax
- 1968: The Peter Brotzmann Octet: Machine Gun
- 1969: Manfred Schoof: European Echoes (FMP, 1969)
- 1973: Globe Unity Orchestra – Live in Wuppertal
- 1986: Global Village Suite
- 1986: Wadada Leo Smith: Human Rights
- 1987: Bill Dixon: Thoughts (Soul Note)
- 1996/2003: Duos 1 / Duos 2
- 1998: Fred Anderson Trio – Live at the Velvet Lounge
- 2001: Peter Brotzmann – Fuck de Boere (recorded in 1968 and 1970)
