= Peter Brötzmann =

German jazz musician (1941–2023)

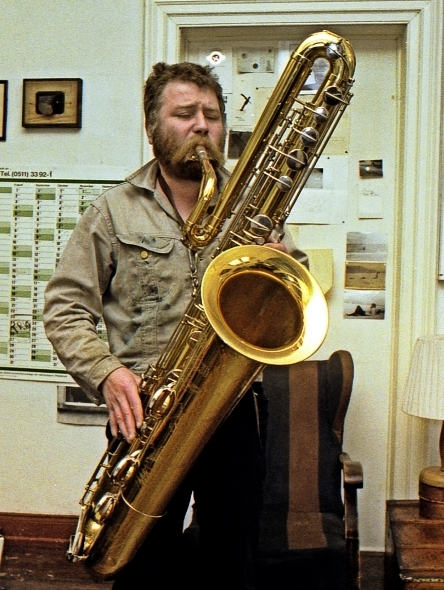
- Brötzmann in 1979

Background information
- Born: 6 March 1941; Remscheid, Germany
- Died: 22 June 2023 (aged 82) Wuppertal, Germany
- Genres: European free jazz, avant-garde jazz, free improvisation
- Occupation: Musician
- Instruments: Saxophone, clarinet, tárogató
- Years active: 1967–2023
- Formerly of: Globe Unity Orchestra, Peter Kowald, Cecil Taylor, Last Exit, Derek Bailey, William Parker, Die Like a Dog Quartet, Sven-Åke Johansson, Evan Parker, Buschi Niebergall, Fred Van Hove, Han Bennink, Willem Breuker, Paal Nilssen-Love, John Zorn

Peter Brötzmann (6 March 1941 – 22 June 2023) was a German jazz saxophonist and clarinetist regarded as a central and pioneering figure in European free jazz. Throughout his career, he released over fifty albums as a bandleader. Amongst his many collaborators were key figures in free jazz, including Derek Bailey, Anthony Braxton and Cecil Taylor, as well as experimental musicians such as Keiji Haino and Charles Hayward. His 1968 Machine Gun became "one of the landmark albums of 20th-century free jazz".

== Biography ==
=== Life ===
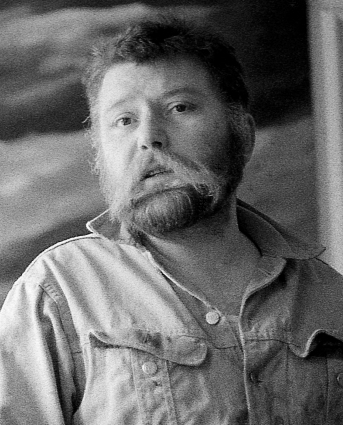
Brötzmann in 1979

Brötzmann was born in Remscheid on 6 March 1941. He studied painting in Wuppertal and was involved with the Fluxus movement but grew dissatisfied with art galleries and exhibitions. He experienced his first jazz concert when he saw American jazz musician Sidney Bechet while still in school at Wuppertal, and it made a lasting impression. He was also inspired by Miles Davis and John Coltrane.

Brötzmann had not abandoned his art training, designing most of his album covers. He taught himself to play clarinet and saxophone, and is also known for playing the tárogató. Among his first musical partnerships was with double bassist Peter Kowald. For Adolphe Sax, Brötzmann's first recording, was released in 1967 and featured Kowald and drummer Sven-Åke Johansson. In 1968, Machine Gun, an octet recording, was released. The album was self-produced under his BRO record label imprint and sold at concerts, and later marketed by FMP. In 2007, Atavistic reissued Machine Gun. "Machine Gun" was a nickname Don Cherry gave him "to describe his violent style".

Brötzmann died on 22 June 2023, at the age of 82, at home in Wuppertal, Germany.

=== Career ===
The album Nipples was recorded in 1969 with many of the Machine Gun musicians, including drummer Han Bennink, pianist Fred Van Hove, tenor saxophonist Evan Parker, and British guitarist Derek Bailey. The second set of takes from these sessions, called More Nipples, is more raucous. Fuck de Boere (dedicated to Johnny Dyani) is a live album of free sessions from these early years, containing two long improvisations, a 1968 recording of "Machine Gun" live (earlier than the studio version) and a longer jam from 1970. Brötzmann was a member of Bennink's Instant Composers Pool, a collective of musicians who released their own records and that grew into a 10-piece orchestra.

The logistics of touring with the ICP tentet or his octet resulted in Brötzmann reducing the group to a trio with Han Bennink and Fred Van Hove. Bennink was a partner in Schwarzwaldfahrt, an album of duets recorded outside in the Black Forest in 1977, with Bennink drumming on trees and other objects in the woods.

In 1981, Brötzmann made a radio broadcast with Frank Wright and Willem Breuker (saxophones), Toshinori Kondo (trumpet), Hannes Bauer and Alan Tomlinson (trombones), Alexander von Schlippenbach (piano), Louis Moholo (drums), and Harry Miller (bass). This was released as the album Alarm.

In the 1980s, Brötzmann's music was influenced by heavy metal and noise rock. He was a member of Last Exit and recorded music with the band's bass guitarist and producer Bill Laswell.

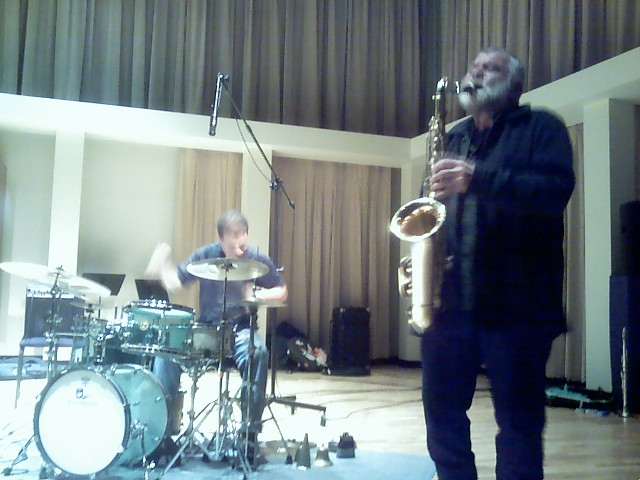
Brötzmann on tenor saxophone, Minnesota Sur Seine, 2006

Brötzmann at the Sonore concert, Lviv, December 2008

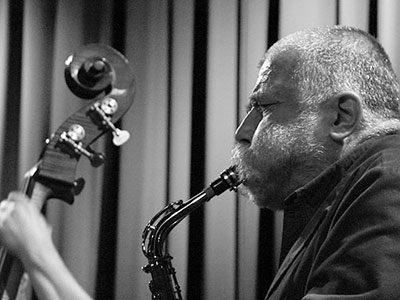
Brötzmann in 2011

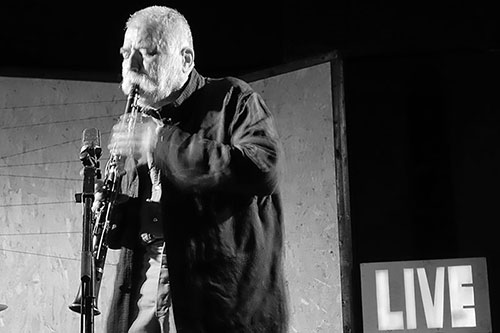
Brötzman in Aarhus 2015

Brötzmann released over fifty albums as a bandleader and appeared on dozens more. His "Die Like a Dog Quartet" (with Toshinori Kondo, William Parker, and drummer Hamid Drake) was loosely inspired by saxophonist Albert Ayler, a prime influence on Brötzmann's music. Beginning in 1997, he toured and recorded regularly with the Peter Brötzmann Chicago Tentet (initially an octet), which he disbanded after an ensemble performance in November 2012 in Strasbourg, France.

Brötzmann also recorded or performed with Cecil Taylor, Keiji Haino, Willem van Manen, Mats Gustafsson, Ken Vandermark, Conny Bauer, Joe McPhee, Paal Nilssen-Love, with Oxbow, and with Caspar Brötzmann, his son.

== Recordings ==
Recordings with Brötzmann as leader include:

- For Adolphe Sax (Brö, 1967)
- Machine Gun (Brö, 1968)
- Nipples (Calig, 1969)
- Solo (FMP, 1976)
- 3 Points and a Mountain with Misha Mengelberg and Han Bennink (FMP, 1979)
- Alarm (FMP, 1983)
- Pica Pica (FMP, 1984)
- Berlin Djungle (FMP, 1987)
- Go-No-Go (FMP, 1987)
- Low Life (Celluloid, 1987)
- In a State of Undress with Jay Oliver (FMP, 1989)
- Réservé with Günter Sommer (FMP, 1989)
- No Nothing (FMP, 1991)
- The Marz Combo Live in Wuppertal (FMP, 1993)
- Songlines with Fred Hopkins and Rashied Ali (FMP, 1994)
- The Chicago Octet/Tentet (Okka Disk, 1998)
- Stone/Water (Okka Disk, 2000)
- The Atlanta Concert with Fred Hopkins (Okka Disk, 2001)
- Fuck de Boere (Atavistic, 2001)
- Short Visit to Nowhere (Okka Disk, 2002)
- Broken English (Okka Disk, 2002)
- More Nipples (Atavistic, 2003)
- Tales Out of Time (HatHut, 2004)
- Signs (Okka Disk, 2004)
- Images (Okka Disk, 2004)
- Be Music Night (Okka Disk, 2005)
- American Landscapes 1 (Okka Disk, 2007)
- American Landscapes 2 (Okka Disk, 2007)
- Hairy Bones with Toshinori Kondo (Okka Disk, 2009)
- Lost & Found (FMP, 2009)
- Goosetalks with Johannes Bauer (Kilogram, 2010)
- Woodcuts with Paal Nilssen-Love (Smalltown Superjazzz, 2010)
- 3 Nights in Oslo (Smalltown Superjazzz, 2010)
- Live in Wiesbaden with Jörg Fischer (Not Two, 2011)
- Yatagarasu with Masahiko Satoh (Not Two, 2012)
- Walk, Love, Sleep (Smalltown Superjazzz, 2012)
- Whatthefuckdoyouwant with Sonny Sharrock (Trost, 2014)
- Mental Shake (Otoroku, 2014)
- Beautiful Lies (Neos, 2016)
- I Surrender Dear (Trost, 2019)

With Han Bennink

- Ein halber Hund kann nicht pinkeln (FMP, 1977)
- Schwarzwaldfahrt (FMP, 1977)
- Still Quite Popular After All Those Years (Brö, 2004)

With Die Like a Dog Quartet

- Die Like a Dog: Fragments of Music, Life and Death of Albert Ayler (FMP, 1994)
- Little Birds Have Fast Hearts Nos. 1 and 2 (FMP, 1998/1999)
- From Valley to Valley (Eremite, 1999)
- Aoyama Crows (FMP, 2002)
- The Complete FMP Recordings (Jazzwerkstatt, 2007) compilation
- Close Up (FMP, 2011)

With Hamid Drake

- The Dried Rat–Dog (Okka Disk, 1995)
- Live at the Empty Bottle (Okka Disk, 1999)

With Mahmoud Guinia and Hamid Drake

- The Wels Concert (Okka Disk, 1997)

With Moukhtar Gania and Hamid Drake

- The Catch of a Ghost (I Dischi Di Angelica, 2020)

With Milford Graves and William Parker

- Historic Music Past Tense Future (Black Editions Archive, 2022)

With Keiji Haino

- Evolving Blush or Driving Original Sin (PSF, 1996)
- The intellect given birth to here (eternity) is too young (Black Editions/Purple Trap, 2022)

With Fred Lonberg-Holm

- The Brain of the Dog in Section (Atavistic, 2008)
- Ouroboros (Astral Spirits, 2018)
- Memories of a Tunicate (Relative Pitch, 2020)

With Last Exit

- Last Exit (Enemy, 1986)
- The Noise of Trouble (Enemy, 1986)
- Cassette Recordings '87 (Enemy, 1987)
- Iron Path (Virgin, 1988)
- Köln (ITM, 1990)
- Headfirst into the Flames (MuWorks, 1993)

With Harry Miller

- The Nearer the Bone, the Sweeter the Meat (FMP, 1979)
- Opened, But Hardly Touched (FMP, 1981)

With Oxbow

- An Eternal Reminder Of Not Today – Live at Moers (Trost Records, 2022)

With William Parker

- Never Too Late But Always Too Early (Eremite, 2003)

With Steve Swell and Paal Nilssen-Love

- Krakow Nights (Not Two, 2015)
- Live in Copenhagen (Not Two, 2016)
- Live in Tel Aviv (Not Two, 2017)

With Fred Van Hove

- Balls (FMP, 1970)
- The End (FMP, 1971)
- Elements (FMP, 1971)
- Brötzmann/Van Hove/Bennink (FMP, 1973)

With Sakari Luoma and Nikolai Yudanov

- Fryed Fruit (Red Toucan Records 2001)

With Wild Man's Band

- Three Rocks and a Pine (Ninth World Music, 1999)
- The Darkest River (Ninth World Music, 2001)

=== As sideman ===
With Frode Gjerstad

- Invisible Touch (Cadence, 1999)
- Sharp Knives Cut Deeper (Splasc(H), 2003)
- Soria Moria (FMR, 2003)
- Live at the Empty Bottle (Circulasione Totale, 2019)

With Globe Unity Orchestra

- Globe Unity 73: Live in Wuppertal (FMP, 1973)
- Pearls (FMP, 1977)
- Jahrmarkt/Local Fair (Po Torch, 1977)
- Improvisations (Japo, 1978)
- Hamburg '74 (FMP, 1979)
- For Example: Workshop Freie Musik 1969–1978 (FMP, 1979)
- Globe Unity 67 & 70 (Atavistic, 2001)
- Globe Unity 2002 (Intakt, 2003)
- Baden-Baden '75 (FMP, 2011)
- FMP: Im Rückblick / In Retrospect (FMP, 2011)
- ...Und Jetzt Die Sportschau (Trost, 2013)

With others

- Ginger Baker, No Material (ITM, 1989)
- Ginger Baker, Live in Munich Germany 1987 (Voiceprint, 2010)
- Caspar Brötzmann, Last Home (Pathological, 1990)
- Don Cherry, Actions (Philips, 1971)
- Marilyn Crispell, Hyperion (Music & Art, 1995)
- Andrew Cyrille, Andrew Cyrille Meets Brötzmann in Berlin (FMP, 1983)
- Laboratorio Musicale Suono plus Peter Brötzmann, deComposition (Setola di Maiale, 2016)
- Joe McPhee, Guts (Okka Disk, 2006)
- Evan Parker, The Bishop's Move (Victo, 2004)
- Manfred Schoof, European Echoes (FMP, 1969)
- Cecil Taylor, Alms/Tiergarten (Spree) (FMP, 1989)
- Cecil Taylor, Olu Iwa (Soul Note, 1994)
- Black Bombaim, Black Bombaim & Peter Brötzmann (Shhpuma Records, 2016)

== Films ==
Two documentaries of Brötzmann's music were produced to honour Brötzmann's 70th birthday in 2011:

- Rage! (also Soldier of the Road), film by Bernard Josse in collaboration with Gérard Rouy (2011)
- Brötzmann, Filmproduktion Siegersbusch, documentary film by René Jeuckens, Thomas Mau and Grischa Windus (DVD, 2011). The film received awards including the Preis der deutschen Schallplattenkritik.

== Awards ==
Brötzmann received a Lifetime Achievement Award at the 2011 Vision Festival in New York City. The same year, he was bestowed the German Jazz Award for his life's achievements.

In 2021, Brötzmann and Nils Petter Molvær were awarded the European Film Awards for their music for the history drama Große Freiheit. In 2022 he received the Preis der deutschen Schallplattenkritik, described by the jury as a personality "going on an individual path, change listening and set new standards in avantgarde jazz" ("die ihren individuellen Weg ging, Hörgewohnheiten veränderte und Maßstäbe setzte im Avantgarde-Jazz").

== Books ==
- Brötzmann, Peter (2014). We Thought We Could Change the World: Conversations with Gérard Rouy. Interviewer and photographer: Gérard Rouy. Hofheim am Taunus, Hesse, Germany: Wolke Verlag. ISBN 978-3-95593-047-9. OCLC 972794335.
