= 3 Points and a Mountain =

Live album by Peter Brötzmann, Misha Mengelberg, and Han Bennink
- Released: 1979
- Recorded: February 26, 1979
- Studio: Akademie der Kunste, Berlin
- Genre: Free improvisation
- Length: 1:16:50
- Label: FMP; 0670

3 Points and a Mountain is a live album by saxophonist Peter Brötzmann, pianist Misha Mengelberg, and percussionist Han Bennink. It was recorded on February 26, 1979, at the Akademie der Kunste in Berlin, and was initially released on vinyl later that year by the FMP label. In 2000, FMP reissued the album on CD, with previously unreleased tracks, under the title 3 Points and a Mountain... Plus, and, in 2022, it was reissued on vinyl by the Cien Fuegos imprint of Trost Records.

== Reception ==
Professional ratings
Review scores
Source	Rating
AllMusic	4.5/5 stars
The Encyclopedia of Popular Music	3/5 stars
The Penguin Guide to Jazz Recordings	2.5/4 stars
Tom Hull – on the Web	B+

In an AllMusic review of the expanded version, Joslyn Layne called the album "a great and enjoyable session from three of the most creative and unique musicians in European avant-garde music," and stated that it is "a surprisingly balanced meeting" between the three players. She commented: "the results are all that you might hope for from these three, and even more light-hearted than you might expect... The three musicians take turns riling each other as the trio whips up engaging, lively music, and have a grand time doing it."

The authors of The Penguin Guide to Jazz Recordings noted that the album "bring[s] out some of Brötzmann's best playing," but cautioned that it is "still subject to the Dutch pair's eccentricities of form."

Author Todd S. Jenkins described the album as "a most memorable session," and wrote: "Mengelberg's presence seems to encourage the others to hold back on the dynamics and have fun with the sound flow. Excellent moments of inspiration abound, and the title track is the most precious offering."

== Track listing ==
Original vinyl release

1. "Brötzmann" (Misha Mengelberg) – 3:21
2. "Gewidmet Frau Hauser" (Han Bennink) – 6:36
3. "There Und Zurück" (Peter Brötzmann) – 13:10
4. "Met Wel Beleefde Groete Van De Kamel" (Misha Mengelberg) – 5:17
5. "3 Points and a Mountain" (Peter Brötzmann) – 12:40
6. "Potzdausend, In's Blaue Hinein" (Han Bennink) – 5:07

CD reissue

1. "Flüchtige Bären" (Misha Mengelberg) – 6:01
2. "The bar seems to vanish in the distance" (Peter Brötzmann) – 19:35
3. "Milan-Milan!" (Han Bennink) – 5:00
4. "Brötzmann" (Misha Mengelberg) – 3:25
5. "Gewidmet Frau Hauser" (Han Bennink) – 6:40
6. "There Und Zurück" (Peter Brötzmann) – 13:12
7. "Met Wel Beleefde Groete Van De Kamel" (Misha Mengelberg) – 5:21
8. "3 Points and a Mountain" (Peter Brötzmann) – 12:43
9. "Potztausend, in's Blaue hinein" (Han Bennink) – 4:55

== Personnel ==
- Peter Brötzmann – alto saxophone, tenor saxophone, E♭ clarinet, A clarinet, bass clarinet
- Misha Mengelberg – piano, voice
- Han Bennink – drums, tenor saxophone, clarinet
