= European free jazz =

Music genre

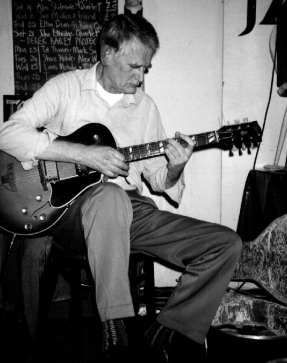
Derek Bailey

European free jazz is a part of the global free jazz scene with its own development and characteristics. It is hard to establish who are the founders of European free jazz because of the different developments in different European countries. One can, however, make an argument that European free jazz took its development from American free jazz, where musicians such as Ornette Coleman revolutionised the way of playing. As the British drummer Eddie Prévost, of long-standing improvising ensemble AMM, has put it, 'the music of Ornette Coleman and Albert Ayler gave us permission to disobey.' Yet at much the same time, there were significant European innovations: for example, the same year as Coleman's Free Jazz album was released (1961), in the UK the Jamaican alto saxophonist Joe Harriott released the first of his experimental albums, Free Form. It was recorded in late 1960, the month before Coleman's.

== American origin ==
Free jazz got its name from the album Free Jazz (Atlantic, 1961) by Ornette Coleman to describe American avant-garde jazz of the 1960s. Besides "avant-garde", it was called "the New Wave", "the New Thing", "action jazz", and in Europe "improvised music". Germans played a form of free jazz that had something in common with the aleatoric music of Bernd Alois Zimmermann and was performed by Derek Bailey, Joachim Kuhn, Albert Mangelsdorff, Manfred Schoof, John Surman, and Alexander von Schlippenbach.

Free jazz was unpopular and didn't sell well. It was viewed as a musical, political, and social backlash to the structure of jazz and of American society at the time. "For some performers the style was loosely linked to the Black Power movement in the USA, partly because of the radical political outlook of some of its practitioners and advocates (e.g., Archie Shepp and LeRoi Jones – later known as Amiri Baraka) and partly owing to the explosive, expressionistic nature of the music itself". Due to the lack of commercial success of the free jazz music as well as the racial issues, like the Civil Rights Movement, many American free jazz musicians began touring the European continent, playing and spreading their new avant-garde style throughout Europe. Jazz musicians like Ornette Coleman, Albert Ayler, Don Cherry, Bud Powell, Don Byas traveled and performed throughout Europe. In contrast to the lack of commercial success in America, many American free jazz musicians experienced both commercial success and acceptance in Europe, leading to tours of Europe and extended residencies. "A number of jazz musicians migrated to other parts of the world, where they received an opposite response, being considered the ultimate expression of high culture. Thus, many of them remained in exile, and they enjoyed unparalleled success in France, Germany, Japan, Scandinavia, and the Netherlands after the world wars".

Although much of American public believed this music to be structure-less, provocative, and ridiculous, some European listeners enjoyed the "dissonant and seemingly chaotic music". "Many Europeans viewed free jazz as the descriptor most used by the media on both sides of the Atlantic for a musical movement that ignited like a flare in the African-American... and Western European...jazz communities. The social context in both cases included a reaction by musicians against a mainstream jazz culture they felt to be colluding with an oppressive Western hegemony that was intrinsically racist, historically imperialistic and exploitive, venally decadent and vicious as its power was challenged". Due in part to the provocative nature of the music as well as the freedom it granted both the musician and the listener, many Europeans associated the backlash toward American society conveyed in free jazz with the counter-culture and anti-imperialist movements in Europe during the late 1960s.

== European acceptance ==
Contrary to the societal reaction free jazz music received in the United States, many Europeans (musicians, critics and young people alike) identified with this style of music. While many African-Americans associated this avant-garde style with the Civil Rights Movement in America, many Europeans in the 1960s, especially college-aged students, associated this style of music with anti-colonialist movements occurring throughout Europe at the same time.

The music under the "free-jazz" rubric – that of Ornette Coleman, Cecil Taylor, Albert Ayler, John Coltrane, Sun Ra and their bands, to name the major pioneers with the most impact in Europe – ignited the jazz scenes there in the mid-to-late 1960s. The subsequent free-jazz movement in their countries was linked to the events and spirit of the 1968 student protests and riots in Paris and Berlin (the " '68ers") as it was to new assertions of black identity in America. The racial conflict specific to the United States translated in Europe to an international radical leftism – one with a youthful white more than an angry black face – hostile to Western imperialistic capitalism and faux-culture.

As American free jazz musicians continued to play throughout Europe, the free jazz genre and the cultural movements in Europe associated with it began to spread as well, influencing many European jazz musicians to imitate the avant-garde style of playing as well as adopting its techniques to create their own individual sound. "Reflecting their diverse backgrounds, these musicians often blend personal narrative reminiscent of an Afrological perspective with some sonic imagery characteristic of European forms spanning several centuries".

== European development of free jazz ==
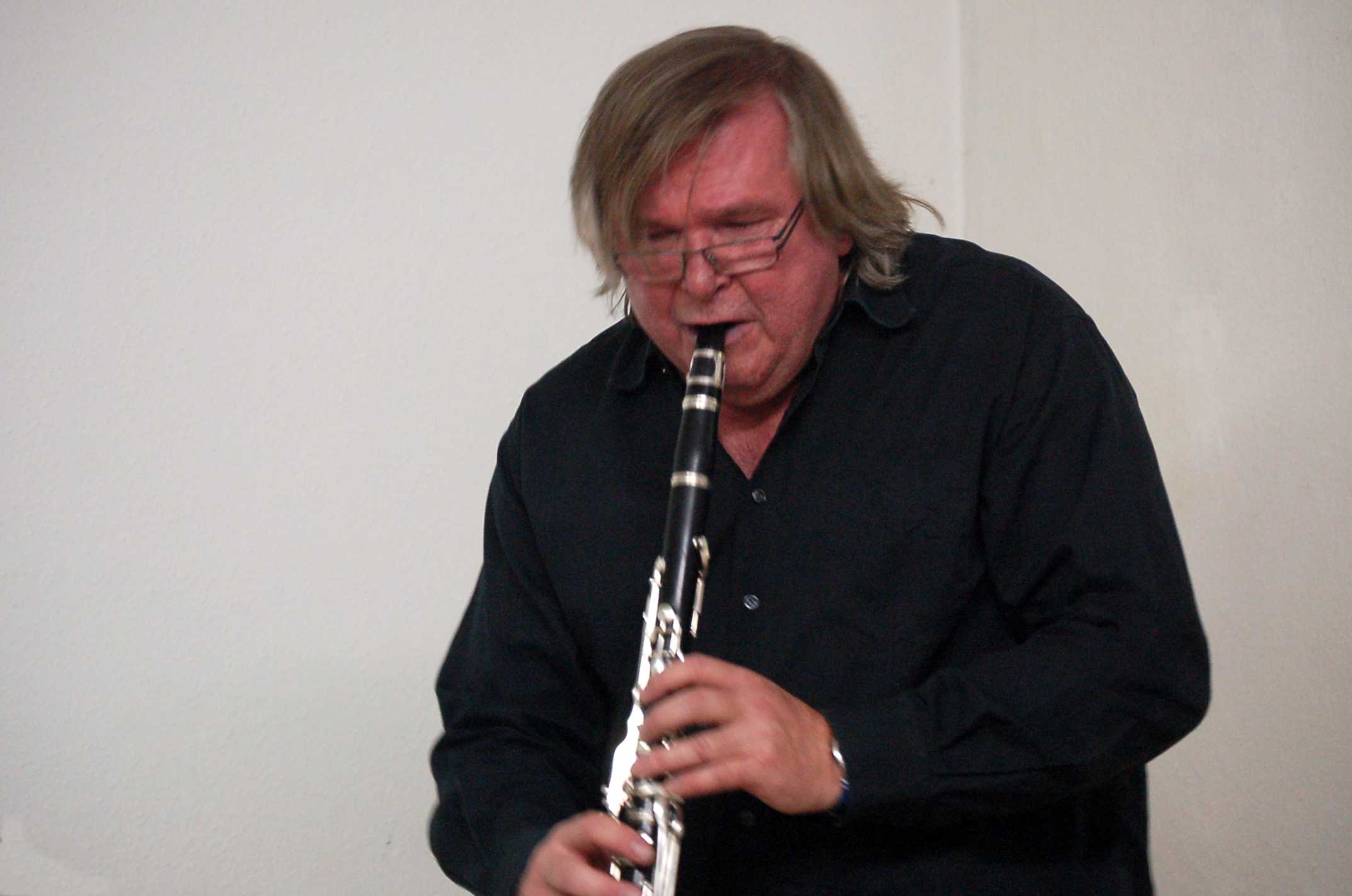
Theo Jörgensmann, 2009

The introduction of this new, avant-garde style influenced many European jazz musicians like the German saxophonist Peter Brötzmann, who is known as one of the first European free jazz musicians. The founders of European free jazz usually came from a classic jazz background and then went over bebop and hard bop into free jazz. Brötzmann began playing free jazz in 1964, and he formed a quintet with Peter Kowald and Sven-Åke Johansson. The following year he toured Europe in a quintet led by Mike Mantler and Carla Bley, and they began an association with the Globe Unity Orchestra that lasted until 1981".

Brötzmann is renowned for his high-strung, fast playing, although the harmonies in his playing are often overlooked. His collaborator Peter Kowald interpreted free jazz on double bass. Kowald helped in creating such organizations as "FMP (1969), which sponsors performances and issues recordings of free jazz, the Wuppertal Free Jazz Workshop, and 360° Spielraum für Ideen, an art gallery and performance space in Wuppertal".

Trombonist Albert Mangelsdorff, although coming from a more classic background, also had great influence. He toured Asia, the United States, and South America and was one "finest trombonists in modern jazz".

Alexander von Schlippenbach's Globe Unity Orchestra created a scandal at its debut in Berlin. In Germany some of the second generation free jazz players came from a more European music background, like Georg Gräwe, Theo Jörgensmann, or Hannes Bauer. In East Germany, trombonist Conny Bauer and drummer Günter Sommer spread free jazz in the Socialist bloc. Bauer "formed Doppelmoppel, a quartet of two trombones and two guitars" in 1982 and participated in the European Jazz Ensemble which celebrated its 20th-anniversary tour in 1996. In the UK saxophonist Evan Parker, who was highly influenced by John Coltrane, took on the role of Brötzmann for Britain. Guitarist Derek Bailey and trombonist Paul Rutherford also developed the British scene. Both Paul Rutherford and Evan Parker experimented with solo improvisation for extended periods of their careers. Slava/Viacheslav/Ganelin, from Soviet Lithuania, came out with a bang in the late 70's, playing with Vladimir Chekasin and percussionist Vladimir Tarasov. Leo Feigin of Leo Records produced dozens of their albums, as well of other musicians from the Eastern Bloc.

In addition to the rise of free jazz musicians in Europe, during the 1960s there was a "sudden surge in critical interest...the emergence of a new cohort of critics – young intellectuals such as Yves Buin, Michel Le Bris, Guy Kopelowicz and Jean-Louis Comolli – who took up the cause of experimental jazz". During this time, free jazz was based less on its American origin and became more European. Through the use of "spontaneous improvisation theoretically free of the diatonic/chromatic and metric systems governing harmony, melody, and rhythm of both pre-free jazz and other Western music", European free jazz musicians created interpretations based on their experience in western Europe. In Europe, this style of music achieved the relative level of success that "'bop,' 'early jazz,' and 'swing' enjoy[ed] in America," during their respective musical periods. According to Oxford Music Online, "In Europe (especially England) free jazz is also known simply as 'improvised music,' particularly in performances which emphasize stylistic connections to avant-garde art music rather than to sounds of African-American origin".

== Free jazz as an art form in Europe ==
As free jazz, or 'improvised music' grew and developed as a popular genre of music in Europe, so did its supporters – both casual and scholarly. While there had always been a close association between free jazz and political and social strife in Europe, many supporters of the genre began pushing to depoliticize the music, urging listeners to consider free jazz as an art form rather than simply a provocative statement on society bereft of any actual musicality. Many listeners of the time believed that, "free jazz was as much a political as a musical phenomenon". During this time, there were fears that if free jazz was only considered as a mechanism for political commentary, that it would lose its validity as an art form, or at worst, be subject to censorship by European governments. Due to this possibility, there was a surge amongst the free jazz community to dissociate the word "free" with the political environment it is so commonly associated with. In addition to the depoliticizing of this genre of music, other critics asserted that,"Were jazz to be valued henceforth according to its capacity to reveal something of the social conditions under which it was produced or the political beliefs that its producers espoused, then its relevance for those outside the particular community from which it issues would be limited. In other words, by only associating jazz or free jazz with a particular ideology or thought process, in effect only those of a similar thought process can understand or appreciate it fully. Rather, if the free jazz genre was dissociated from the view that it is simply a vehicle for political commentary, and instead it was viewed objectively as a form of art, it would not only would be accessible to a larger audience, but it would allow itself to be judged as an art rather than the political statement it may or may not be attempting to make.

== Aftermath of free jazz ==
After the popularity of the late 1960s and 1970s in Europe, improvised music began to influence and became influenced by other genres of music. In the United States, Europe, and the rest of the world, musicians continued to play improvisational music, but they also looked to other genres for inspiration. This term 'improvised music' may, of course, be used in the common dictionary sense, and it is particularly useful in references to the pan-genre eclecticism which has characterized much music-making from the 1980s onwards, as musicians draw freely from, or meld together, not only jazz and contemporary art music but also aspects of various mainstream popular musics (blues, rock, soul, pop), heavy metal and world music (ethnic traditions).
