= Globe Unity Orchestra =

Free jazz ensemble

The Globe Unity Orchestra is a free jazz ensemble.

Globe Unity was formed in autumn 1966 with a commission received by Alexander von Schlippenbach from the Berlin Jazz Festival. It had its debut at the Berliner Philharmonie on 3 November combining Gunter Hampel's quartet with Manfred Schoof' s quintet and Peter Brötzmann's trio: Hampel (bcl, fl); Willem Breuker (bs, ss); Schoof (tp) with Gerd Dudek (ts); Alexander von Schlippenbach (p); Buschi Niebergall (b) and Jaki Liebezeit (d) on one side, Brötzmann (saxophones), Peter Kowald (b, tuba), Sven-Åke Johansson (d) on the other.

During the next years this core group was completed by other European and American musicians: Johannes Bauer (tb), Anthony Braxton (as, cl), Willem Breuker (ts), Rüdiger Carl (as, ts), Günter Christmann (tb), Gunter Hampel (bcl), Toshinori Kondo (tp), Steve Lacy (ss), Paul Lovens (drums), Paul Lytton (drums), Albert Mangelsdorff (tb), Evan Parker (ss, ts), Michel Pilz (bcl, cl, bars), Ernst-Ludwig Petrowsky (as, cl, fl), Enrico Rava (tp), Paul Rutherford (tb), Heinz Sauer (ss, ts), Bob Stewart (tuba), Tomasz Stańko (tp), and Kenny Wheeler (tp).

The Orchestra has been described as providing "the most remarkable assemblies of outside jazz talent since the AACM big bands".

They performed in New Delhi, India for the Jazz Yatra in late 1970s. They performed at the Ashoka Hotel, New Delhi in 1978.

The final concert in the group's main lifetime was at the Chicago Jazz Festival in 1987.

The 40th anniversary line-up for the 2006 concerts and recordings were the saxophone players Evan Parker, Ernst-Ludwig Petrowsky, Gerd Dudek, Rudi Mahall (bcl), the trumpets Kenny Wheeler, Manfred Schoof, Axel Dörner, Jean-Luc Cappozzo and trombonists Paul Rutherford, George E. Lewis, Jeb Bishop, J. Bauer) with Alexander von Schlippenbach (p), and drummers Paul Lovens and Paul Lytton.

== Discography ==
- 1966.12 – Globe Unity – SABA (1967) (Alexander von Schlippenbach, Karlhanns Berger, Claude Deron, Gunter Hampel, Manfred Schoof, Albert Mangelsdorff, Peter Brötzmann, Gerd Dudek, Kris Wanders, Willem Breuker, Buschi Niebergall, Peter Kowald, Jaki Liebezeit, Mani Neumeier) (1969 – MPS Records, 1999 – HGBS)
- 1967.10 – Globe Unity 67 & 70 – Atavistic (2001) (Alexander von Schlippenbach, Manfred Schoof, Peter Brötzmann, Gerd Dudek, Evan Parker, Willem Breuker, Albert Mangelsdorff, Paul Rutherford, Peter Kowald, Buschi Niebergall, Jaki Liebezeit, Han Bennink, Paul Lovens)
- 1973.03 – Live in Wuppertal – FMP (1973) (Alexander von Schlippenbach, Peter Brötzmann, Gerd Dudek, Evan Parker, Peter Kowald, Paul Rutherford, Albert Mangelsdorff, Günter Christmann, Paul Lovens, Han Bennink) (2011 – FMP, 2021 – Corbett vs. Dempsey)
- 1973.09 – Globe Unity/Sun – MPS (1975) (Alexander von Schlippenbach, Manfred Schoof, Peter Brötzmann, Gerd Dudek, Evan Parker, Albert Mangelsdorff, Paul Rutherford, Derek Bailey, Peter Kowald, Paul Lovens, Han Bennink)
- 1974.03 – Globe Unity '74 – FMP S4 EP (1979) (Mongezi Feza, Manfred Schoof, Peter Brötzmann, Rüdiger Carl, Gerd Dudek, Evan Parker, Michel Pilz, Günter Christmann, Albert Mangelsdorff, Paul Rutherford, Peter Kowald, Alexander von Schlippenbach, Buschi Niebergall, Paul Lovens)
- 1974.11 – Hamburg '74 – FMP (1979) (Alexander von Schlippenbach, Kenny Wheeler, Peter Brötzmann, Gerd Dudek, Evan Parker, Albert Mangelsdorff, Paul Rutherford, Peter Kowald, Paul Lovens, Han Bennink, Choir of the NDR) (2012 – FMP)
- 1975.04 – Evidence Vol. 1 – FMP (1976) (Alexander von Schlippenbach, Enrico Rava, Manfred Schoof, Peter Brötzmann, Gerd Dudek, Evan Parker, Albert Mangelsdorff, Paul Rutherford, Peter Kowald, Paul Lovens) (2012 – FMP)
- 1975.04 – Into the Valley Vol. 2 – FMP (1976) (Alexander von Schlippenbach, Enrico Rava, Manfred Schoof, Peter Brötzmann, Gerd Dudek, Evan Parker, Albert Mangelsdorff, Paul Rutherford, Peter Kowald, Paul Lovens) (2012 – FMP)
- 1975.05 – Globe Unity Orchestra – FMP S6 EP (1979) (Kenny Wheeler, Manfred Schoof, Günter Christmann, Albert Mangelsdorff, Paul Rutherford, Peter Brötzmann, Rüdiger Carl, Gerd Dudek, Evan Parker, Michel Pilz, Peter Kowald, Alexander von Schlippenbach, Buschi Niebergall, Paul Lovens)
- 1975.11 – Pearls – FMP (1977) (Alexander von Schlippenbach, Enrico Rava, Manfred Schoof, Peter Brötzmann, Gerd Dudek, Evan Parker, Albert Mangelsdorff, Paul Rutherford, Peter Kowald, Paul Lovens)
- 1975.11 – Jahrmarkt/Local Fair – Po Torch (1977) (Alexander von Schlippenbach, Enrico Rava, Manfred Schoof, Peter Brötzmann, Gerd Dudek, Evan Parker, Albert Mangelsdorff, Paul Rutherford, Peter Kowald, Paul Lovens, Peter Eötvös)
- 1977.09 – Improvisations – Japo Records (1978) (Alexander von Schlippenbach, Manfred Schoof, Kenny Wheeler, Peter Brötzmann, Gerd Dudek, Evan Parker, Albert Mangelsdorff, Paul Rutherford, Buschi Niebergall, Paul Lovens)
- 1979.01 – Compositions – Japo Records (1980) (Alexander von Schlippenbach, Kenny Wheeler, Manfred Schoof, Peter Brötzmann, Gerd Dudek, Evan Parker, Albert Mangelsdorff, Paul Rutherford, Bob Stewart, Buschi Niebergall, Paul Lovens)
- 1982.01 – Intergalactic Blow – Japo Records (1983) (Alexander von Schlippenbach, Toshinori Kondo, Kenny Wheeler, Gerd Dudek, Evan Parker, Ernst-Ludwig Petrowsky, Albert Mangelsdorff, Paul Rutherford, Günter Christmann, Bob Stewart, Günter Sommer, Paul Lovens)
- 1986.11 – 20th Anniversary – FMP (1993) (Alexander von Schlippenbach, Kenny Wheeler, Manfred Schoof, Toshinori Kondo, Peter Brötzmann, Gerd Dudek, Evan Parker, Ernst-Ludwig Petrowsky, Albert Mangelsdorff, Paul Rutherford, Hannes Bauer, Bob Stewart, Alan Silva, Paul Lovens, Günter Sommer)
- 2002.11 – Globe Unity 2002 – Intakt Records (2003) (Alexander von Schlippenbach, Manfred Schoof, Axel Dörner, Jean-Luc Cappozzo, Evan Parker, Ernst-Ludwig Petrowsky, Gerd Dudek, Johannes Bauer, Paul Rutherford, Peter Kowald, Paul Lovens)
- 2006.11 – Globe Unity 40 Years – Intakt Records (2007) (Alexander von Schlippenbach, Kenny Wheeler, Manfred Schoof, Axel Dörner, Jean-Luc Cappozzo, Peter Brötzmann, Evan Parker, Gerd Dudek, Ernst-Ludwig Petrowsky, Rudi Mahall, Albert Mangelsdorff, Paul Rutherford, Johannes Bauer, Hannes Bauer, Paul Lovens)
- 2016.11 – Globe Unity 50 Years – Intakt Records (2018) (Alexander von Schlippenbach, Manfred Schoof, Axel Dörner, Tomasz Stańko, Evan Parker, Gerd Dudek, Ernst-Ludwig Petrowsky, Daniele D'Agaro, Rudi Mahall, Ryan Carniaux, Christof Thewes, Paul Lovens)

== See also ==
- List of experimental big bands
