= Gunter Hampel =

German jazz musician (1937–2026)

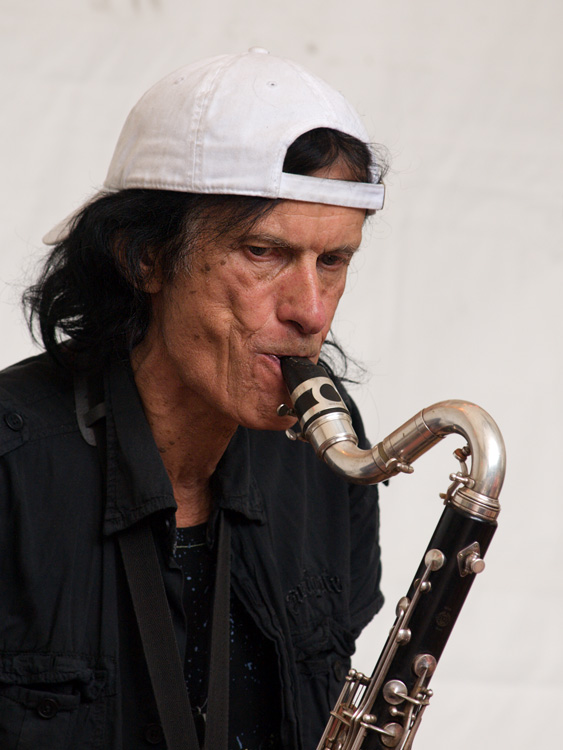
- Hampel in 2008

Background information
- Born: 31 August 1937; Göttingen, Gau Southern Hanover-Brunswick, German Reich
- Died: 18 May 2026 (aged 88)
- Genres: Free jazz
- Occupations: Musician; Composer
- Instruments: Vibraphone, clarinet, saxophones, piano, flute
- Label: Birth
- Website: gunterhampelmusic.de

Gunter Hampel (31 August 1937 – 18 May 2026) was a German jazz vibraphonist, clarinettist, saxophonist, flautist, pianist, and composer. He was instrumental in creating improvising jazz in Europe after World War II. He founded his own record label, Birth, in 1969. Inspired by his wife, vocalist Jeanne Lee, he pursued international collaboration and founded the Galaxie Dream Band. Hampel worked with younger musicians and in regular workshops for children and youth.

== Life and career ==
Hampel was born in Göttingen on 31 August 1937. He took piano lessons from age five. He was first exposed to jazz after World War II when troops occupying his hometown listened to it on the American Forces Network; he first heard Louis Armstrong and was impressed. Hampel remembered that he first jammed on is accordion at age eight with an African-American soldier who lived with the family. He learned to play recorder, accordion, clarinet, saxophone and vibraphone by age 16. He founded jazz bands as a teenager, playing different styles, and also began composing. Hampel studied architecture and classical percussion, because jazz studies were not established at the time.

He became dedicated to free jazz professionally in the 1960s. He moved to Amsterdam and became friends with jazz players there. In 1964 he moved to Paris, where Eric Dolphy introduced him to the bass clarinet. He formed a quintet with Manfred Schoof, Alexander von Schlippenbach, Buschi Niebergall and Pierre Courbois; their 1965 recording Heartplants is regarded as among the earliest example of European free jazz that was internationally recognised. Their free jazz sounds impressionist and relaxed, more spiritual than virtuoso.

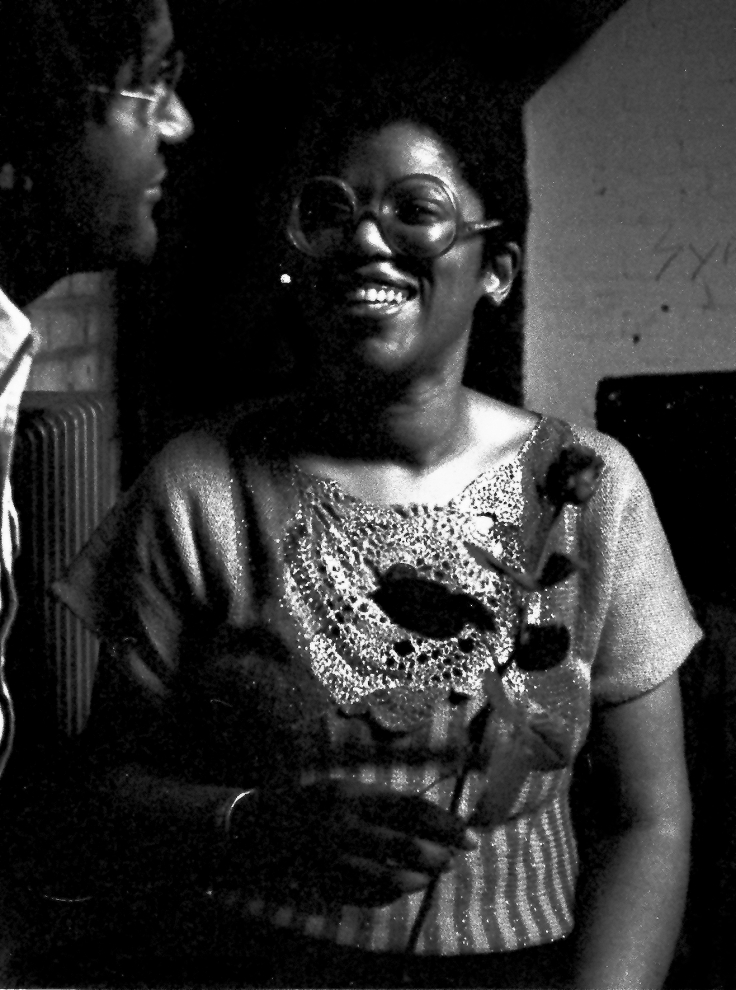
Jeanne Lee in 1984

Hampel met the vocalist Jeanne Lee, whose symbiosis of singing and dance inspired him. They made duo albums such as Scheiße '71, and got married. She took him to New York City and initiated collaborations with saxophonist Marion Brown, trumpeter Don Cherry and pianist Cecil Taylor, among others.

Returning to Göttingen, Hampel founded a record label, Birth Records, in 1969; the first album they produced was The 8th of July 1969, a collection of his compositions performed by a group with Lee, Anthony Braxton, percussionist Steve McCall, sax-player Willem Breuker, and bassist Arjen Gorter. He also worked with John McLaughlin, Muruga Booker, Laurie Allan, Udo Lindenberg, Archie Shepp, Marion Brown, Steve McCall, and Perry Robinson.

From 1972 Hampel lived alternating between Göttingen and New York City, where he formed the Galaxie Dream Band in the mid-1970s, pursuing an international collaboration. Other formations were Free Jazz Trio, World Community Orchestra, and New York Orchestra.

In the 1990s Hampel collaborated with hip hop musicians, including Jazzkantine. He kept working with younger musicians, interested in jazz in context with improvisation, dance and literature. He was active in workshops and other formats to reach children and youth.

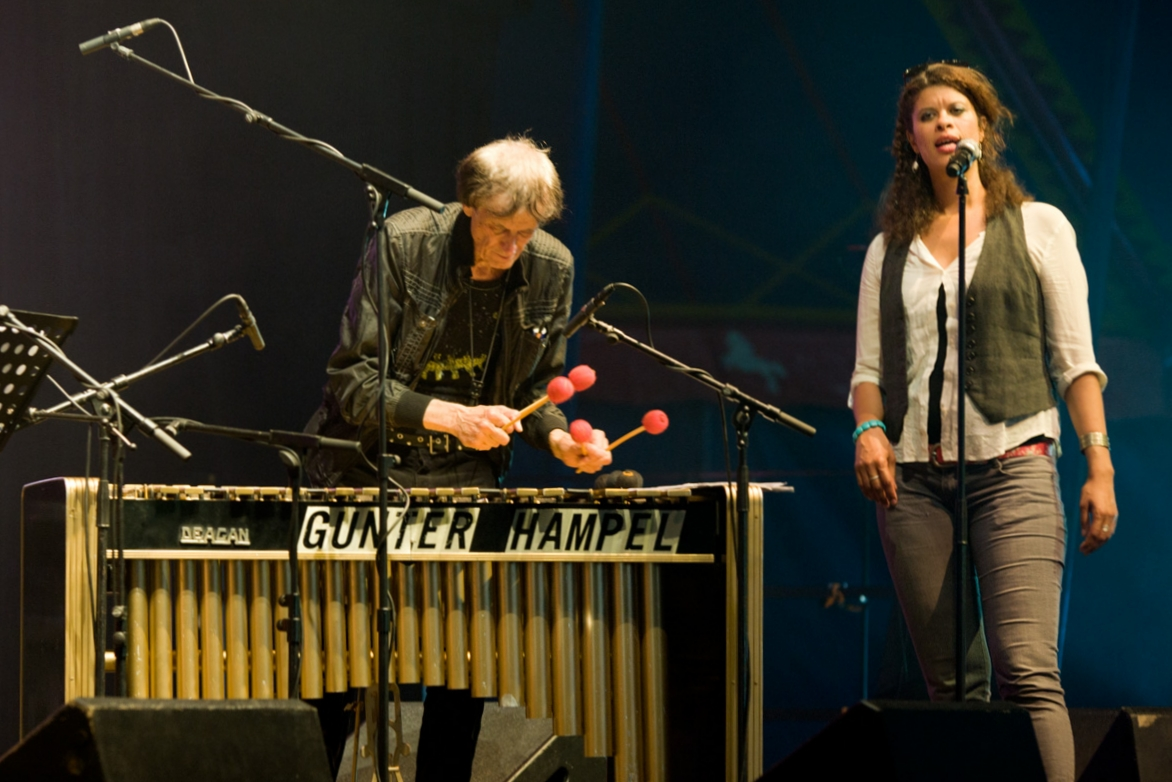
Hampel with his daughter, Cavana Lee, at the Moers Festival in 2012

Hampel performed on stage until a few weeks before his death, playing piano and vibes with his daughter Cavana Lee Hampel and his son Ruomi.

Hampel died on 18 May 2026, at the age of 88.

== Discography ==
Hampel made around 100 recordings, as soloist, leader and sideman.

- Heartplants (SABA, 1965)
- Music from Europe (ESP, 1968)
- The 8th of July 1969 (Birth, 1969)
- Dances (Paris 1969) (Birth, 1969)
- Espace with Boulou Ferre (Birth, 1970)
- Spirits (Birth, 1971)
- Out of New York (MPS/BASF, 1971)
- Ballet-Symphony No. 5, Symphony No. 6 (Birth, 1971)
- Broadway/Folksong (Birth, 1972)
- Angel (Birth, 1972)
- Waltz for 3 Universes in a Corridor (Birth, 1972)
- I Love Being with You (Birth, 1972)
- Unity Dance (Birth, 1973)
- Journey to the Song Within (Birth, 1974)
- Celebrations (Birth, 1974)
- Ruomi (Birth, 1974)
- Out from Under (Birth, 1974)
- Cosmic Dancer (Birth, 1975)
- Enfant Terrible (Birth, 1975)
- Transformation (Birth, 1976)
- Vogelfrei (Birth, 1976)
- All Is Real (Birth, 1978)
- That Came Down on Me (Birth, 1978)
- Flying Carpet (Kharma, 1978)
- Reeds 'n' Vibes with Marion Brown (Improvising Artists, 1978)
- Freedom of the Universe with Jeanne Lee (Birth, 1979)
- Oasis with Jeanne Lee (Horo, 1979)
- All the Things You Could Be If Charles Mingus Was Your Daddy (Birth, 1980)
- Wellen/Waves (FMP, 1980)
- Life on This Planet (Birth, 1981)
- A Place to Be with Us (Birth, 1981)
- Companion (Birth, 1982)
- Gemini (Birth, 1983)
- Jubilation (Birth, 1985)
- Dialog with Matthias Schubert (Birth, 1992)
- Time Is Now (Birth, 1992)
- Celestial Glory (Birth, 1992)
- Next Generation (Birth, 1995)
- Koln Concert One (Birth, 1997)
- Koln Concert Part 2 (Birth, 1997)
- Solid Fun with Christian Weidner (Birth, 1998)
- The 8th of September (Birth, 1999)
- Survivor (Birth, 2001)
- Earthlings (Birth, 2001)
- The Way Out (Birth, 2003)
- Zeitgeist (Birth, 2006)
- Celestial Travellin'...and Other Ways to Get Around (Birth, 2006)
- Stellar Dust (Birth, 2008)
- Vibes Vibes (Birth, 2009)
- Lifer (Birth, 2009)
- Solo Concert – Brandenburg Concerto (Birth, 2012)
- Holy Lights + Human Rights (Birth, 2014)
- Fukushima (Birth, 2014)
- Psychedelic Lullaby for Artificial Babies (Birth, 2014)
- Bounce (Intuition 2017)

== Awards ==
In 1978 Hampel was noted as "New Star" on the vibes by the reviewers from the Down Beat who had declared him a romantic before. He received the 1997 Niedersächsischer Staatspreis. Hampel was awarded the Albert Mangelsdorff Prize in November 2007 for his life achievements. He received the Order of Merit of the Federal Republic of Germany on 23 June 2009.
