= Sven-Åke Johansson =

Swedish musician (1943–2025)

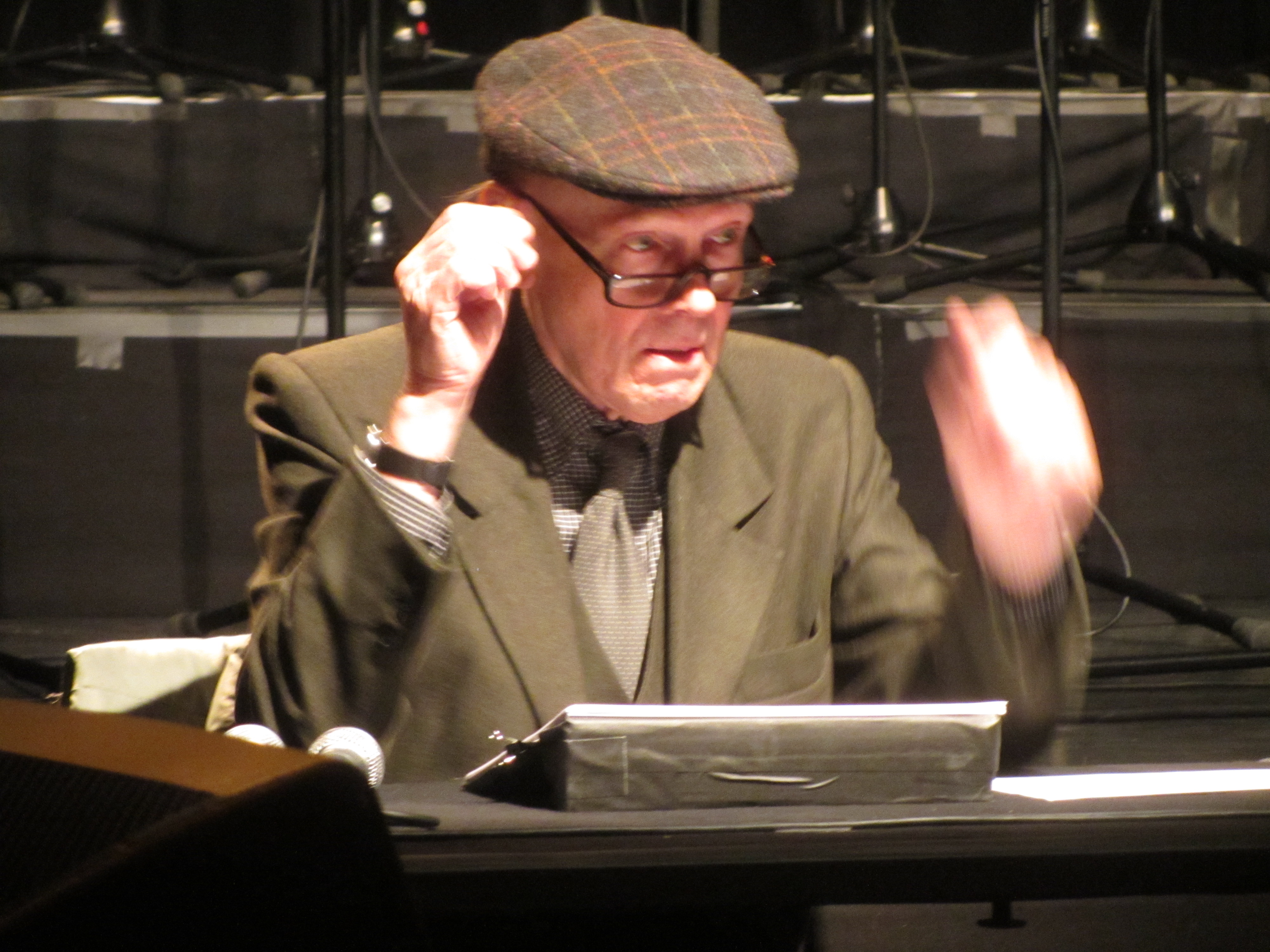
Johansson in 2014

Sven-Åke Johansson (1943 – 15 June 2025) was a Swedish composer, drummer, poet, author and visual artist associated with European free jazz and free improvisation. He was born in Mariestad and lived in Berlin from 1968 onwards.

== Life and career ==
Johansson was one of the first European free jazz drummers: he was part of the Peter Brötzmann trio that recorded For Adolphe Sax (1967) and Machine Gun (1968), alongside bassist Peter Kowald. He experimented with sound, and played multiple instruments. Johansson briefly joined an early incarnation of Tangerine Dream in 1968, played in the Globe Unity Orchestra and with German reedist Alfred Harth and Belgian pianist Nicole Van den Plas in E.M.T. In 1972, he recorded and released Schlingerland, one of the first solo free jazz recordings by a drummer, later rereleased on CD. Johansson formed a long-running duo with pianist Alexander von Schlippenbach in 1976.

Johansson contributed to numerous exhibitions, publications and hundreds of recordings. He also produced radio plays for several German radio stations. He played with Hans Reichel, Jeanne Lee, Gunter Hampel, Michel Waisvisz, Axel Dörner, Albert Oehlen, Rhodri Davis, Ken Vandermark, Otomo Yoshihide, Rüdiger Carl, Andrea Neumann, and many others.

Beginning in 2010, he worked in collaboration with German vocalist and composer Oliver Augst. The duo created a concert program called Eisler im Sitzen, as well as various radio plays, such as In St. Wendel am Schloßplatz, which was broadcast on Deutschlandfunk in 2017 and presented live at various locations. Johansson also collaborated with electronic musician Jan Jelinek (on modular synthesizer) from at least 2017. Johansson died on 15 June 2025, at the age of 82.
