= Willem Breuker =

Dutch bandleader, composer, saxophonist and clarinetist (1944–2010)

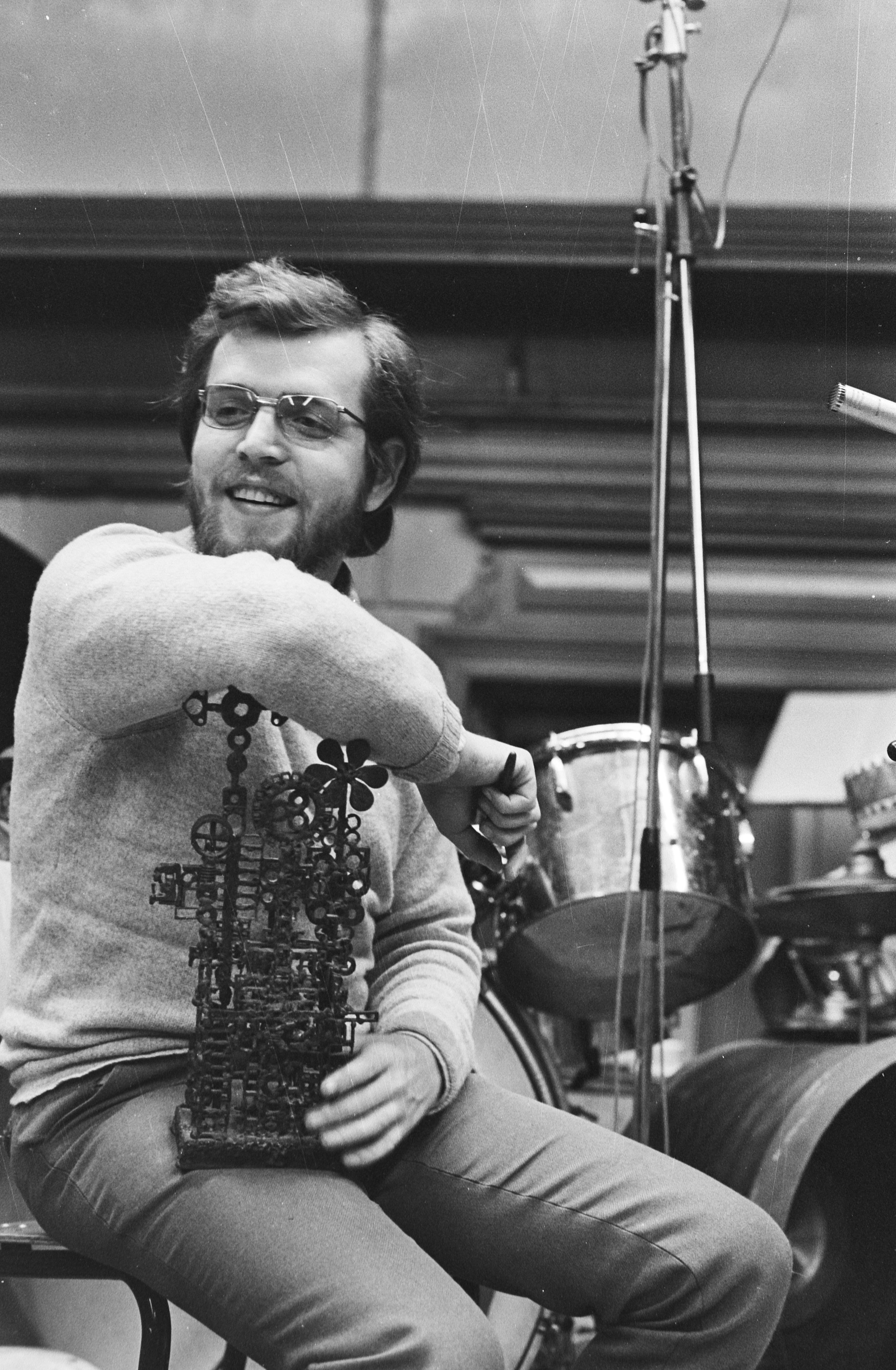
- Breuker in 1970

Background information
- Born: 4 November 1944; Amsterdam, Reichskommissariat Niederlande (Modern-day Netherlands)
- Died: 23 July 2010 (aged 65) Amsterdam, Netherlands
- Genres: Jazz, Avant-garde jazz, European free jazz, Free improvisation, Experimental big band
- Occupations: Musician, composer, arranger
- Instruments: Saxophone, clarinet, bass clarinet
- Labels: Instant Composers Pool, Marge
- Formerly of: Han Bennink, Misha Mengelberg, Globe Unity Orchestra

Willem Breuker (4 November 1944 – 23 July 2010) was a Dutch bandleader, composer, arranger, saxophonist, and clarinetist.

== Career ==
During the mid-1960s, he played with percussionist Han Bennink and pianist Misha Mengelberg, co-founding the Instant Composers Pool (ICP), with which he regularly performed until 1973. He was a member of the Globe Unity Orchestra and the Gunter Hampel Group.

In 1974, he began leading the 10-piece Willem Breuker Kollektief, which performed jazz in a theatrical and often unconventional manner, drawing elements from theater and vaudeville. With the group, he toured Western Europe, Russia, Australia, India, China, Japan, the United States, and Canada. In 1974, he founded the record label BV Haast. Beginning in 1977, he organized the annual Klap op de Vuurpijl (Top It All) festival in Amsterdam. Haast Music Publishers, which he also operated, published his scores.

In 1992, Editions de Limon published the book Willem Breuker by J. and F. Buzelin in France. Uitgeverij Walburg Pers published a Dutch translation in 1994. In 1999, BV Haast published the book Willem Breuker Kollektief: Celebrating 25 Years on the Road, which includes two albums.

In 1997, he produced with Carrie de Swaan Componist Kurt Weill, a 48-hour, 12-part radio documentary on the life of Kurt Weill.

He died on 23 July 2010 in Amsterdam. He suffered from lung cancer and had been ill for some time.

== Awards and honors ==
In 1998, Breuker was knighted with the Order of the Netherlands Lion.

In 2017, the Willem Breuker Prijs was awarded for the first time to Reza Namavar. A bi-annual prize for contemporary composers, it was last awarded in 2019 to Nora Mulder.
