= Manfred Schoof =

German jazz trumpeter (born 1936)

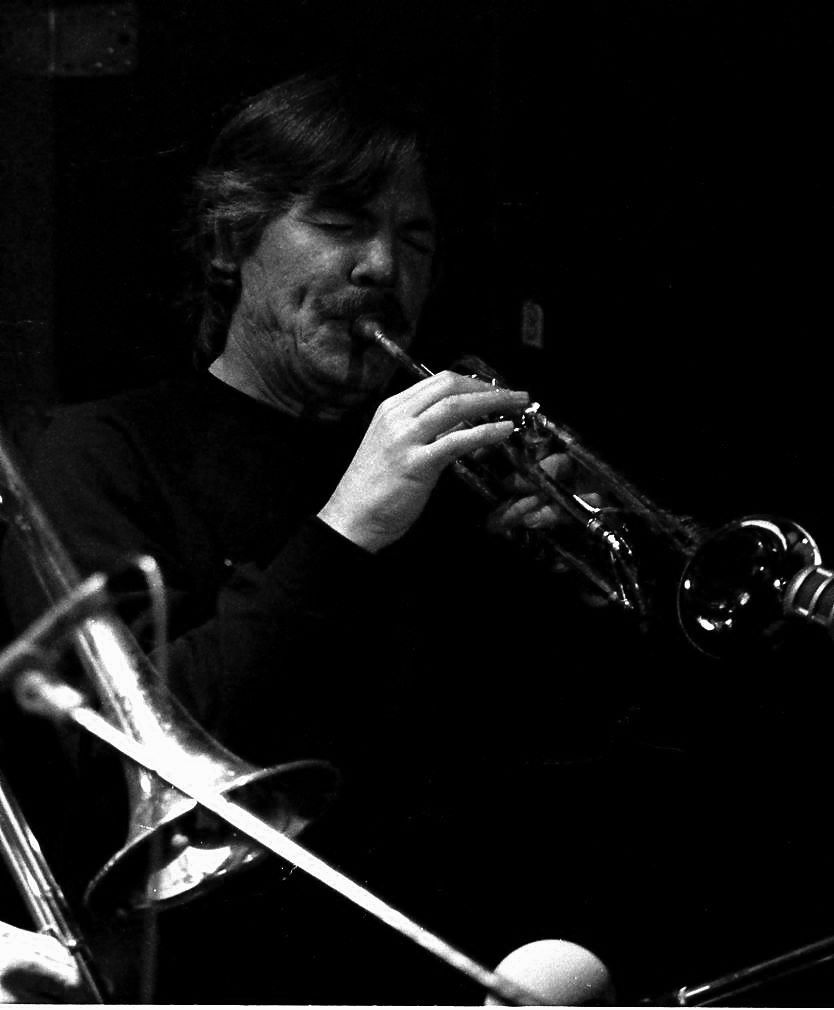
- Manfred Schoof in 1984

Background information
- Born: 6 April 1936 (age 89); Magdeburg, Germany
- Genres: Jazz, free jazz, classical
- Occupation: Musician
- Instrument: Trumpet
- Years active: 1960s–present
- Labels: FMP, Wergo

Manfred Schoof (born 6 April 1936) is a German jazz trumpeter.

== Career ==
Schoof was born in Magdeburg, Germany. He studied music in Kassel and Cologne, where one of his teachers was the big band leader Kurt Edelhagen. Schoof performed on Edelhagen's radio program and toured with Gunter Hampel. In late 1950s and early-mid 1960s, Schoof played with drummer Jaki Liebezeit, the future co-founder of krautrock band Can.

In the 1960s Schoof started a free jazz band with Alexander von Schlippenbach and Gerd Dudek which became the basis for Manfred Schoof Orchestra. From 1969 to 1971 he was a member of the George Russell Orchestra. He has also worked with Jasper Van't Hof and the Globe Unity Orchestra. He composed classical music for Berlin Philharmonic. His group has participated in performances of Die Soldaten, an operatic work by the contemporary composer Bernd Alois Zimmermann. He was featured in a profile on composer Graham Collier in the 1985 Channel 4 documentary 'Hoarded Dreams'.

Since 2007 he has been chairman of the Union Deutscher Jazzmusiker. He has been a professor in Cologne since 1990.

== Discography ==
=== As leader ===
- Voices (CBS, 1966)
- Jazz Meets India (SABA, 1967) – with Dewan Motihar Trio, Irène Schweizer Trio and Barney Wilen
- Manfred Schoof Sextet (Wergo, 1967)
- European Echoes (FMP, 1969)
- Distant Thunder (Enja, 1975) – with Akira Sakata, Yosuke Yamashita and Takeo Moriyama
- Scales (ECM, 1976)
- Light Lines (Japo, 1978)
- The Early Quintet (FMP, 1978)
- Horns (FMP, 1979) – with Gunter Christmann, Gerd Dudek, Albert Mangelsdorff, Paul Rutherford and Kenny Wheeler
- Horizons (Japo, 1980)
- Mal Waldron/Manfred Schoof (Amiga, 1980) – with Mal Waldron
- Reflections (Mood, 1984)
- Power Station (UBM, 1984)
- Meditation (UBM, 1987)
- Shadows & Smiles (Wergo, 1989) – with Rainer Brüninghaus
- Timebreaker (UBM, 1990)
- Crossroad (UBM, 1992)

=== As sideman ===
With European Jazz Ensemble

- Live (Konnex, 1988)
- At the Philharmonic Cologne (MA Music, 1989)
- Meets the Khan Family (MA Music, 1992)
- 20th Anniversary Tour (Konnex, 1997)
- 30th Anniversary Tour 2006 (Konnex, 2009)

With Globe Unity Orchestra

- Live in Wuppertal (FMP, 1973)
- Der Alte Mann Bricht...Sein Schweigen (FMP, 1974)
- Bavarian Calypso/Good Bye (FMP, 1975)
- Pearls (FMP, 1977)
- Improvisations (Japo, 1978)
- Hamburg '74 (FMP, 1979)
- Compositions (Japo, 1980)
- Globe Unity 2002 (Intakt, 2003)
- Baden-Baden '75 (FMP, 2011)

With George Gruntz

- Happening Now! (Hat ART, 1988)
- First Prize (Enja, 1989)
- Renaissance Man (TCB, 2002)

With Gunter Hampel

- Heartplants (SABA, 1965)
- Transformation (Birth, 1976)
- Jubilation (Birth, 1983)
- Legendary: The 27th of May 1997 (Birth, 1998)
- Live at Berlin Philharmonic Hall (Birth, 2014)

With Irmin Schmidt

- Filmmusik Vol. 2 (Spoon, 1981)
- Filmmusik Vol. 3 & 4 (Spoon, 1983)
- Rote Erde (Teldec, 1983)
- Musk at Dusk (WEA, 1987)

With Jasper van 't Hof

- Pili-Pili (Keytone, 1984)
- Hoomba-Hoomba (Virgin, 1985)
- Jakko (Jaro, 1987)

With Alexander von Schlippenbach

- Globe Unity (SABA, 1967)
- The Living Music (Quasar, 1969)
- Globe Unity 67 & 70 (Atavistic, 2001)
- Globe Unity 40 Years (Intakt, 2007)
- Blue Hawk (Jazzwerkstatt, 2011)
- Globe Unity 50 Years (Intakt, 2018)

With others

- Peter Brotzmann, In a State of Undress (FMP, 1989)
- Don Cherry, Actions (Philips, 1971)
- Graham Collier, Hoarded Dreams (Cuneiform, 2007)
- Wolfgang Dauner, 80 Jahre Das Jubilaumskonzert (Timba, 2017)
- Miles Davis & Quincy Jones, Live at Montreux (Warner 1991)
- Gabi Delgado-López, Mistress (Virgin, 1982)
- Dissidenten, Instinctive Traveler (Exil, 1997)
- Stan Getz, Francy Boland, Kenny Clarke/Francy Boland Big Band, Change of Scenes (Verve, 1971)
- Albert Mangelsdorff, Albert Mangelsdorff (Fabbri Editori, 1981)
- George Russell, Electronic Sonata for Souls Loved by Nature (Flying Dutchman, 1971)
- Gunter Sommer, Le Piccole Cose Live at Theater Gutersloh (Intuition, 2017)
- Gunter Baby Sommer, Peitzer Grand Mit Vieren (Jazzwerkstatt, 2009)
- Heiner Stadler, Retrospection (Tomato, 1989)
- Fredy Studer, Christy Doran, Half a Lifetime (Unit, 1994)
- Mal Waldron, Hard Talk (Enja, 1974)
- Mal Waldron, One-Upmanship (Enja, 1977)
- Bernd Alois Zimmermann, Requiem fur Einen Jungen Dichter (Wergo, 1989)
- Tony Oxley Quintet, Angular Apron (Corbett vs. Dempsey, 2024)
