= Fred Van Hove =

Belgian jazz musician (1937–2022)

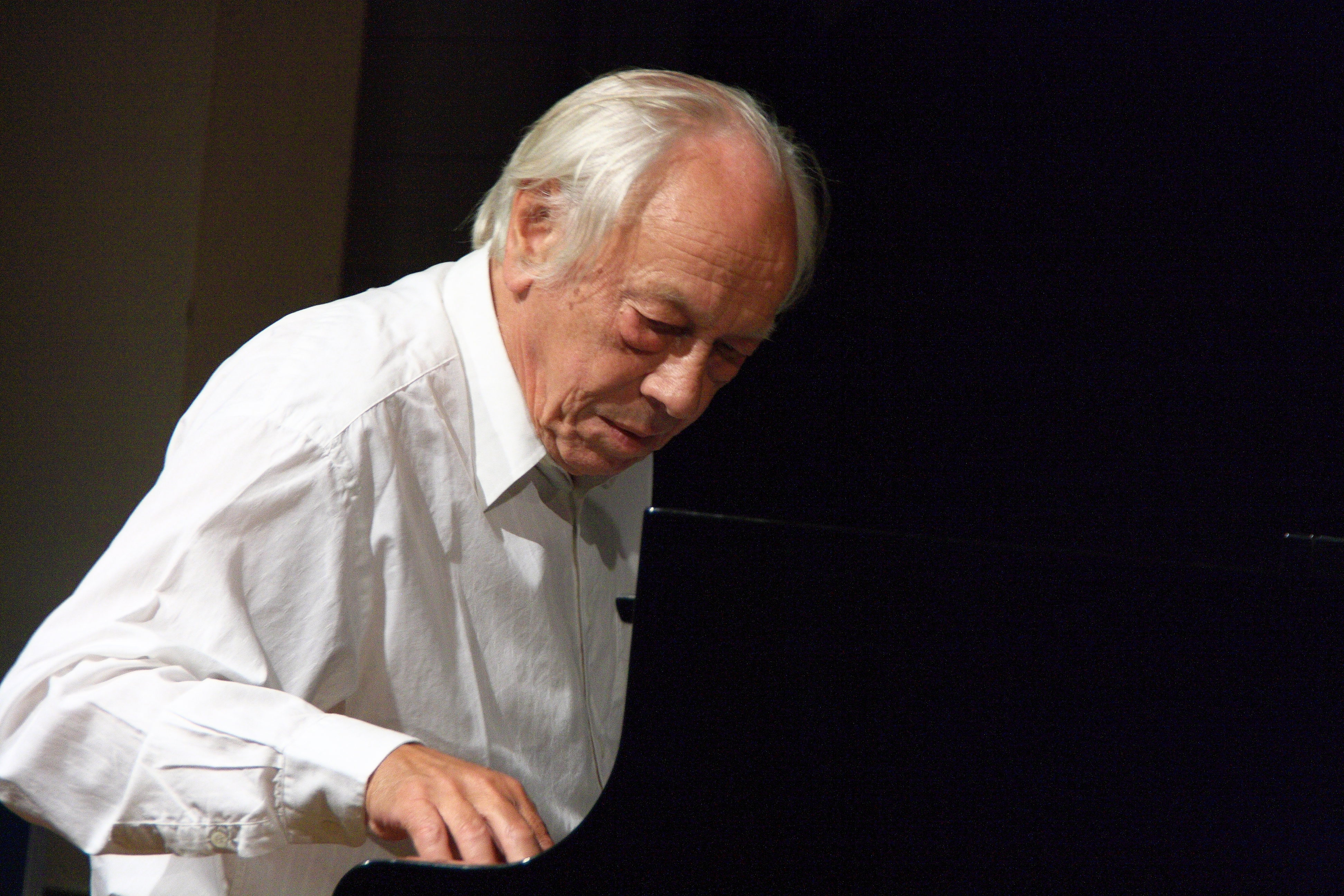
- Van Hove in 2013

Background information
- Born: 19 February 1937; Antwerp, Belgium
- Died: 13 January 2022 (aged 84)
- Genres: Jazz
- Occupation: Musician
- Instrument: Piano
- Years active: 1960s–2022

Fred Van Hove (19 February 1937 – 13 January 2022) was a Belgian jazz musician and a pioneer of European free jazz. He was a pianist, accordionist, church organist, and carillonist, an improviser and a composer. In the 1960s and 1970s he performed with saxophonist Peter Brötzmann and drummer Han Bennink.

== Life and career ==
Van Hove studied musical theory, harmony and piano in Belgium. He began an association with saxophonist Peter Brötzmann in 1966, playing on his early quartet and sextet recordings including 1968's Machine Gun album, and then as part of a trio with Brötzmann and drummer Han Bennink. Van Hove later played in a number of duos, notably with saxophonists Steve Lacy and Lol Coxhill and with trombonists Albert Mangelsdorff and Vinko Globokar. He composed music for film and theatre, and taught local musicians in Berlin. He held workshops in Germany, France, England, Belgium, and the Netherlands, and held studios at the University of Lille III. Van Hove collaborated with a number of his fellow Belgian musicians, and in 1996 was given the title of Cultural Ambassador of Flanders by the Flemisch government. He died on 13 January 2022, at the age of 84.
