= FMP/Free Music Production =

German jazz record label (founded 1969)

Free Music Production (FMP)
- Founded: 1969
- Founder: Jost Gebers
- Genre: Jazz
- Country of origin: Germany
- Location: Berlin
- Official website: www.fmp-label.de

Free Music Production (FMP) is a German record label that specialises in free jazz.

== Origins ==
FMP originated from the New Artists Guild, which was an informal cooperative of musicians in the mid-1960s. In 1968, The New Artists Guild sponsored the Total Music Meeting, a festival that presented different forms of music from those performed at the Berliner Jazztage. The name FMP was adopted the following year and the group "began operating as a cooperative venture under the administrative guidance of a former double bass player, Jost Gebers [...] At some point the operation of FMP transferred from the cooperative to Gebers alone."

== Company activities ==
The label's first release was Manfred Schoof's European Echoes. Specialising in free jazz from the beginning, FMP soon released recordings by saxophonist Peter Brötzmann, pianist Alexander von Schlippenbach, bassist Peter Kowald and drummer Detlef Schönenberg.

The collective ended in 1976 and Gebers, who was running the company part-time, decided to found a sub-label, SAJ, with drummer Sven-Ake Johansson. This concentrated on experimental and avant-garde music, releasing recordings by musicians such as Hugh Davies, Heiner Goebbels-Alfred Harth and Yoshi Wada. In the late 1980s, SAJ was discontinued and CD releases were numbered from CD 1.

A lot of FMP's releases have been recordings of concert performances, including those that it organised. In 1988 FMP recorded Cecil Taylor in Berlin '88, an 11-CD, award-winning collection. According to Grove, "Vinyl stock was deleted in 1992".

In 2000 FMP-Publishing became the new owner of FMP, but a legal battle ensued between Gebers and the new group. In 2007, he returned to being in charge of the label. Some albums have been reissued by other labels, which include Intakt Records and Atavistic Records. In its first 40 years, FMP released "over 200 LPs and around 140 CDs".

== See also ==
- List of record labels
