= Piano Solos =

Piano Solos or Piano Solo may refer to:

- Piano Solos (George Winston album), 1972
- Piano Solos (Cedar Walton album), 1981
- Piano Solo, an envisaged plot for an Italian coup in 1964
- Piano Solo (Thelonious Monk album), 1954
- Piano Solo (Stefano Bollani album), 2005
- Piano Solo Vol. 1 and Piano Solo Vol. 2, 1992 albums by Irène Schweizer
- Piano, solo, 2007 Italian drama film directed by Riccardo Milani

== See also ==
- Piano solo
- Solo Piano (disambiguation)
