= Günter Sommer =

German jazz drummer

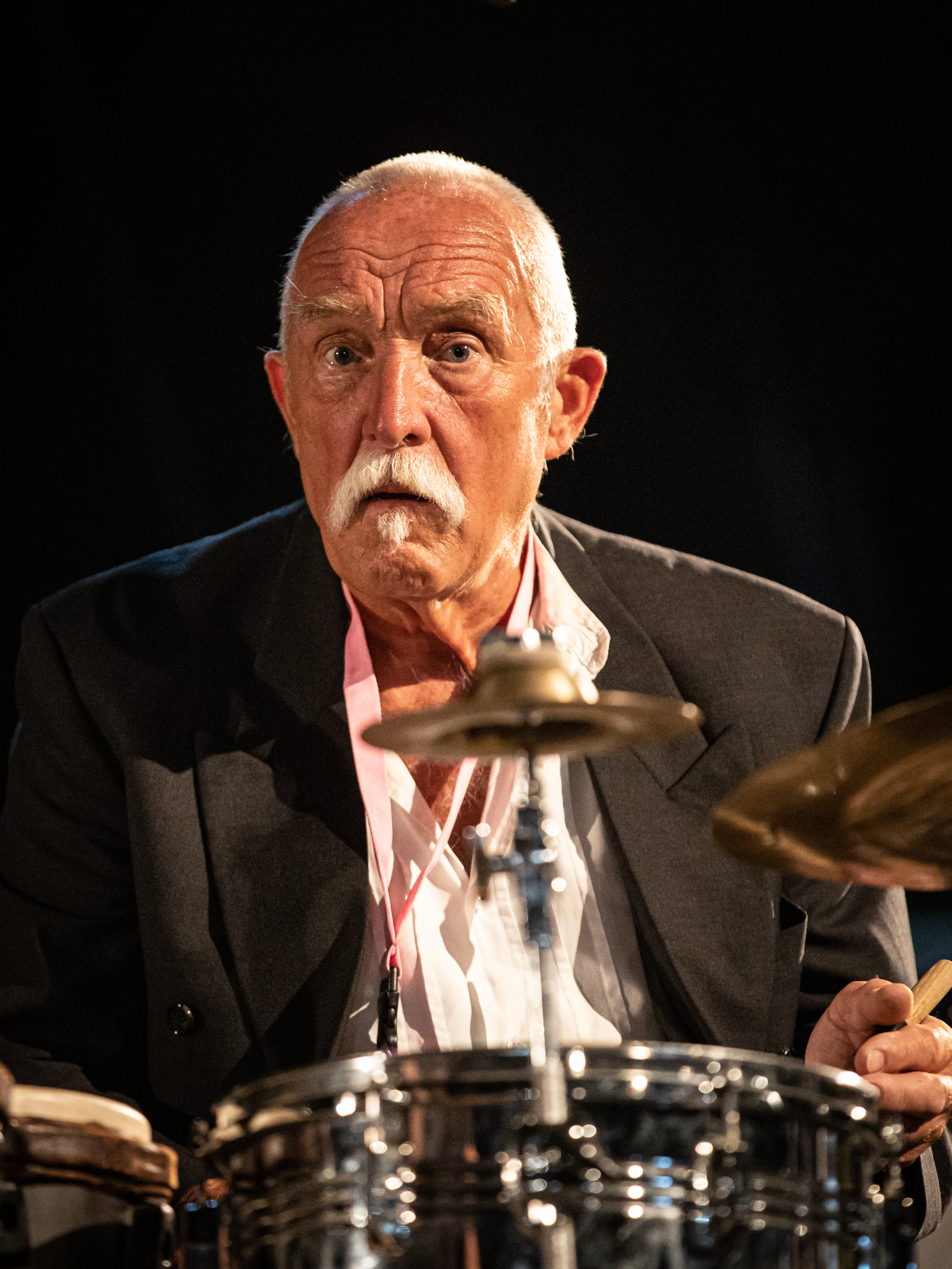
- Sommer at Moers Festival, 2020

Background information
- Also known as: Günter "Baby" Sommer
- Born: August 25, 1943 (age 82); Dresden, Germany
- Genres: Avant-garde jazz, Free jazz, Free improvisation
- Occupation: Musician
- Instrument: Drums
- Years active: 1960s–present
- Labels: Intakt Records, FMP, Moers Music, ILK Music, Euphorium Records, JazzHausMusik, Splasc(h)

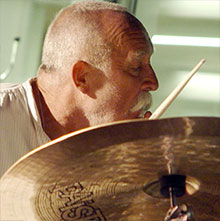
Günter Sommer in Aarhus, Denmark 2010

Günter "Baby" Sommer (born 25 August 1943) is a German jazz drummer.

== Career ==
Sommer was born in Dresden on 25 August 1943. His first instrument was the trumpet, which he studied at school. He started playing the drums aged 15 or 16. He studied music at Hochschule für Musik Carl Maria von Weber in Dresden. A solo percussion album, Hormusik, was released by FMP in 1979. In the same year, FMP also released a trio album recorded with Peter Kowald and Wadada Leo Smith. He has worked with Smith intermittently throughout his career. During the 1980s he also worked with Peter Brötzmann, Irene Schweizer, Cecil Taylor, and with the writer Gunter Grass. In the early 1990s he began leading a trio with Didier Levallet, then with Theo Jörgensmann, and joined in 1995 for 13 years as drums professor the faculty at Hochschule für Musik Carl Maria von Weber. His usual nickname Baby is due to a comparison, homage to the multifaceted US drummer Baby Dodds.

== Discography ==
- Gruppe Synopsis with Synopsis (Amiga, 1974)
- Hormusik (FMP, 1979)
- Touch the Earth with Wadada Leo Smith (FMP, 1980)
- Dedication with Hans-Günther Wauer (FMP, 1982)
- Hormusik Zwei (Nato, 1983)
- If You Want the Kernels You Have to Break the Shells with Peter Kowald (FMP, 1983)
- Pica Pica with Peter Brotzmann and Albert Mangelsdorff (FMP, 1984)
- Percussion Summit with John Purcell, Urszula Dudziak (Moers Music, 1984)
- Verschrankte Konstruktion with Hans-Günther Wauer (Amiga, 1986)
- Live at Taktlos with Irène Schweizer and Maggie Nicols (Intakt, 1986)
- Irène Schweizer & Günter Sommer (Intakt, 1988)
- The Storming of the Winter Palace with Irene Schweizer (Intakt, 1988)
- Reserve with Peter Brotzmann (FMP, 1989)
- In East Berlin with Cecil Taylor (FMP, 1989)
- Riobec with Cecil Taylor (FMP, 1989)
- Cordes Sur Ciel with Didier Levallet (European Music/Sud-Ouest, 1990)
- Camino Fatal with Ekkehard Jost (Fish Music, 1990)
- Cappuccini Klang with Peter Kowald (Splasc(h), 1992)
- Sachsische Schatulle: Hormusik III (Intakt, 1993)
- Merseburger Begegnung with Hans-Günther Wauer (Kip, 1994)
- BIB with Sylvain Kassap, Didier Levallet (FMP, 2002)
- Wokonda with Achim Jaroschek (Konnex, 2003)
- Between Heaven and Earth with Conny Bauer and Peter Kowald (Intakt, 2003)
- Hic Sunt Leones with Frank Paul Schubert (Jazz Haus, 2007)
- Delphinius & Lyra with Raymond MacDonald (Clean Feed, 2007)
- Wisdom in Time with Wadada Leo Smith (Intakt, 2007)
- Abbara with Rafik Schami (Intakt, 2008)
- Peitzer Grand Mit Vieren (Jazzwerkstatt, 2009)
- Live in Jerusalem (Kadima Collective, 2009)
- Songs for Kommeno (Intakt, 2012)
- Jesper Lovdal Gunter Sommer (ILK Music, 2012)
- Dry Swing & Tandem Spaces with Oliver Schwerdt (Euphorium, 2013)
- Three Seasons (HGBS, 2014)
- Sources with Johannes Enders (Moderntunemusic, 2016)
- Fundstuecke with Gabriele Hasler (Laika, 2016)
- Le Piccole Cose (Intuition, 2017)
- Baby's Party (Intakt, 2018)
- Grande Casino with EUPHORIUM_freakestra (Euphorium, 2018)
- One For My Baby And One More For The Bass with Barry Guy and Oliver Schwerdt (Euphorium, 2020)
- Karawane with The Lucaciu 3 (Intakt, 2022)
