= Fleuve (album) =

Studio album by Pierre Favre Ensemble
- Released: 10 October 2006
- Recorded: October 2005
- Studios: Volkshaus; Basel, Switzerland
- Genres: Jazz; chamber jazz
- Length: 51:57
- Labels: ECM; ECM 1977
- Producer: Manfred Eicher

Pierre Favre Ensemble chronology
Singing Drums (1984)	Fleuve (2006)	Le Voyage (2010)

Pierre Favre chronology
Two in One (2005)	Fleuve (2006)	Solo: Münster, Berne (2005)

Fleuve is the second album credited to the Pierre Favre Ensemble, recorded in Switzerland in October 2005 and released on ECM October the following year—twenty two years after the ensemble's 1984 debut, Singing Drums, presenting a new line-up that departed from the previous incarnation's all-percussion sound. The septet now included harp, double clarinet, double bass, tuba, guitar, bass guitar, soprano saxophone, and serpent—an instrument rarely used in jazz.

The music has a deep bottom end due to the low-end instruments, but Favre keeps a light texture, partly due to the low instruments being played in their highest registers and arrangements which highlight different instruments. The album was influenced by Renaissance music and baroque music. Favre maintains a melodic sound which doesn't dominate over other instruments. Music critics praised Fleuve.

== Background and recording ==
As a drummer, Favre built a career as one of jazz's most respected percussionists. His work has become defined by a lack of boundaries, working in styles such as free jazz, world music, and contemporary classical music. For ECM he has contributed to many albums, including John Surman's Such Winters of Memory (1983), Dino Saluzzi's Once Upon a Time - Far Away in the South (1986) and Paul Giger's Alpstein (1991).

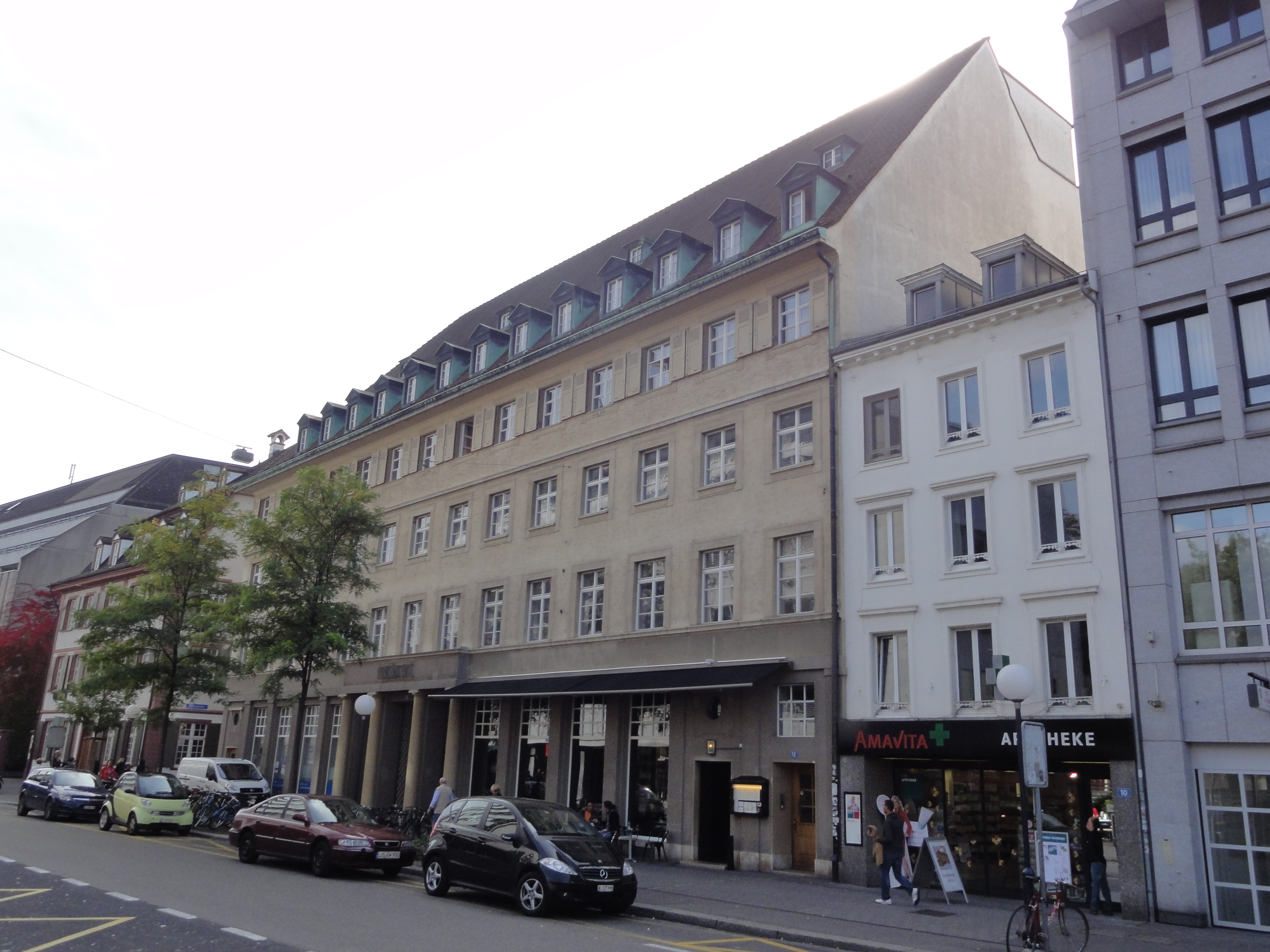
Volkshaus, Basel, Switzerland, where Fleuve was recorded

Favre's first album as leader for ECM was Singing Drums (1984), an all-percussion recording and the first album by the Pierre Favre Ensemble, at the time consisting of Favre, Paul Motian, Fredy Studer, and Nana Vasconcelos. Singing Drums established his "fertile relationship" with ECM. Although the album inspired Favre's Singing Drums ensemble, which recorded the album Souffles (1998) for Swiss label Intakt Records, he did not record another album with the ensemble until Fleuve.

Fleuve is Favre's first album for ECM in over a decade, his final up until that point being Window Steps (1995). It is a return for the Pierre Favre Ensemble, now containing a new line-up of Favre on percussion and drums, Wolfgang Zwiauer on bass guitar, Michel Godard on tuba and serpent, Frank Kroll on bass clarinet and soprano saxophone, Philipp Schaufelberger on guitar, Hélène Breschand on harp, and Bänz Oester on double-bass. This line-up was considered unconventional, with one writer noting that the inclusion of the serpent, a military horn, was particularly unusual for a jazz album. The album was recorded in October 2005 at Volkshaus, Basel, Switzerland, with ECM owner Manfred Eicher producing the recording and with engineering by Daniel Dettweiler. The space in Eicher's production were said by Thom Jurek of AllMusic to provide "an unhurried sense of time's stasis," thus making the album "all the more appealing" in that it slowly brings listeners through the recording. Eicher mixed the album with Favre at Idee Und Klang Studio, Switzerland.

== Music ==
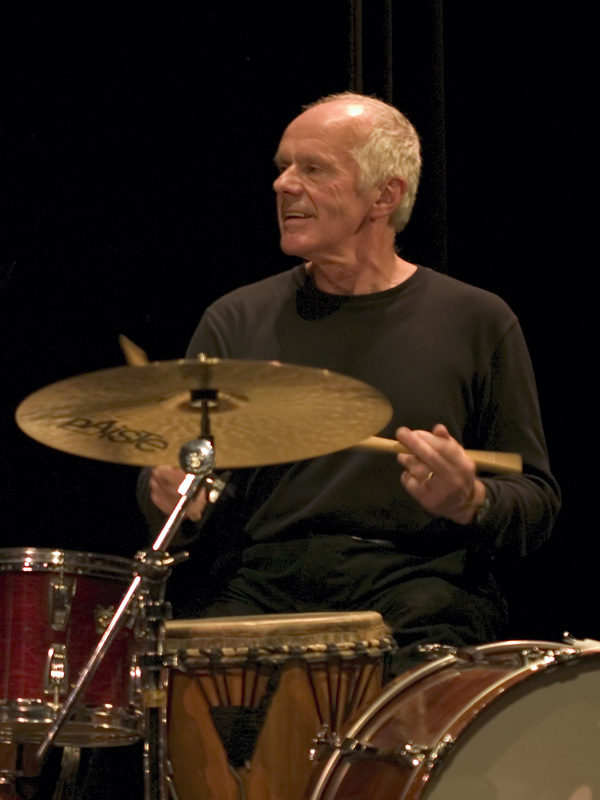
Pierre Favre in October 2005, the month Fleuve was recorded

Throughout Fleuve, the ensemble has a naturally deep bottom end, due to Favre's drums, Oëster's double bass, Zwiauer's bass guitar and Godard's tuba and serpent playing, with the middle- to high-end instrumentation courtesy of Schaufelberger's guitar, Kroll's soprano saxophone and bass clarinet and Breschand's harp. Despite featuring very bottom-heavy instrumentation, the music has been noted by critics for its light, airy, ethereal sound. The light texture to the music is largely provided by several characteristics, namely numerous instruments playing concurrently, low instruments often being played in their highest registers, arrangements with shifting instrument focuses at any given time, and the "touch used by the bassists." Budd Kopman of All About Jazz writes of the overall sound:

"The music dances (often literally), and is light, airy and transparent. Favre seems to go out of his way to choose instrumentation that works against such a result by being bottom-heavy: acoustic and electric bass, tuba, serpent and bass clarinet are included. However, to lighten things, soprano saxophone is used instead of bass clarinet at times, while harp and guitar are added to the mix; plus, of course, Favre's precise and light drums and percussion."

Elements of Renaissance and baroque music are evident throughout the album's blended musical textures. Barry Witherden of BBC Music Magazine feels it is the bass, drums, guitar and harp which combine to "carry the pulse" against the strong rhythmic backdrop on all seven compositions. Although Favre is the bandleader, he generally keeps to a melodic sound that generally places his drums equal to other instruments in the mix, although he does not forgo the larger rhythmic aspect of the drums, as is evidenced by "Reflet Sud," which "moves inexorably and insistently forward." Regardless, Steve Futterman of Jazz Times writes that Favre's "selfless adherence to big-picture equilibrium" means that he rarely feels like the band leader.

=== Structure ===
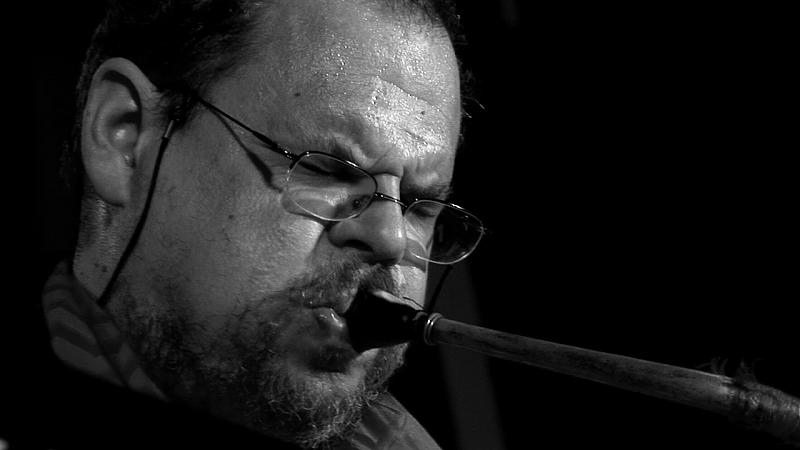
French tuba and serpent player Michel Godard

Opening track "Mort d'Eurydice" alludes to Renaissance music and starts with a harp and percussion-based free section. The piece's central section features a bass-set rhythm resembling a heartbeat. "Panama" is the most melodic track, with figures from the harp and double bass accompanied by hand percussion, before giving way to a flash of cymbals announcing a more ethereal section where the guitar approximates a melody. The track contains three solos and ends with a brief, non-sequitur coda. "Reflet Sud" displays the anchoring tuba and serpent balancing the basses, before the guitar work moves the instruments into a middle-range improvisation.

"Fire Red-Gas Blue-Ghost Green" is said to be the most ethereal track, which opens with bass guitar and double bass and transforms into a jazz tune containing Middle Eastern modalities. Writer Andy Kelman writes that the track's "Middle-to-Far Eastern flavor" is countered by its "more expansive landscape" with Schaufelberger's guitar solo and Kroll's bass clarinet solo. A steady bass drum largely supports the other instrumentation throughout "Nile", which features low-end serpent working against the "pinging" harp. Favre's percussion is most emphasised on "Decors," which contains the album's only genuine drum solo. Futterman felt Favre's "evocative hand-drumming" on the track "[breaks] past a stately theme." Witherden detected the influence of Tudor music on the piece, while Kopman more broadly wrote that the song creates tension via its constant shift "between Renaissance dance and African polyrhythms."

== Release and reception ==
Professional ratings
Review scores
Source	Rating
AllMusic	3.5/5 stars
All About Jazz (Budd Kopman review)	4.5/5 stars
All About Jazz (John Kelman review)	5/5 stars

Fleuve was released on 10 October 2006 by ECM Records. It features a photograph by Jean-Guy Lathuilière on the album cover and further photographs in the liner notes by Ueli Nüesch. The album received positive reviews from music critics. Thom Jurek of AllMusic called the album "beautiful" and stated: "Fleuve is an album of gorgeous, flowing textures and sound colors that seduce the listener toward them, bringing them slowly along through the recording". Steve Futterman of Jazz Times was largely favourable, saying that "Favre rigorously transforms Fleuve into a kaleidoscope of surprising musical colors." Though expressing a "niggling complaint" in that Kroll's piping soprano saxophone "can land the quirky group sound back in overly familiar ECM territory," he nonetheless felt the combinations of the other instruments were imaginative and help distinguish the project from other jazz albums. He also felt that Favre's "lean toward scrupulous craft" was perhaps emblematic of his Swiss background.

Barry Witherden of BBC Music Magazine called Fleuve one of Favre's "most captivating albums" and wrote that "it is the agreeable melodies and the ingenious, fresh and attractive voicings that distinguish the session." All About Jazz correspondent Budd Kopman felt that Fleuve highlights that Favre not only masters his own instrument but also "has complete command in the fields of composition and arrangement." He felt that the album was "timeless" despite its allusions to Renaissance music on "Mort d'Eurydice" and "Decors," with each track boasting an individual charm, and concluded that "Favre has created music of many layers that exists totally outside of any specific genre. By turns profound, exciting and overtly beautiful, Fleuve is art of the highest degree". Also writing for Just About Jazz, John Kelman said: "There are those who believe that percussionists don't make compelling composers and/or bandleaders. Favre's small but significant body of work for ECM lays waste to any such claims, with Fleuve the best argument yet". Les Inrockuptibles called Fleuve a "majestic" album.

== Track listing ==
All compositions by Pierre Favre

1. "Mort d'Eurydice" – 5:33
2. "Panama" – 6:35
3. "Albatros" – 7:57
4. "Reflet Sud" – 8:03
5. "Fire Red – Gas Blue – Ghost Green" – 7:55
6. "Nile" – 8:24
7. "Decors" – 7:30

== Personnel ==
=== Pierre Favre Ensemble ===
- Pierre Favre – drums, percussion
- Michel Godard – tuba, serpent
- Frank Kroll – soprano saxophone, bass clarinet
- Helene Breschand – harp
- Philipp Schaufelberger – guitar
- Bänz Oester – double bass
- Wolfgang Zwiauer – bass guitar
