= Irène Schweizer & Günter Sommer =

Live album by Irène Schweizer and Günter Sommer
- Released: 1988
- Recorded: February 1987
- Venue: Rote Fabrik, Zürich, Switzerland
- Genre: Free improvisation
- Length: 42:42
- Label: Intakt; CD 009
- Producer: Intakt Records

Irène Schweizer chronology
Irène Schweizer & Louis Moholo (1987)	Irène Schweizer & Günter Sommer (1988)	Irène Schweizer & Andrew Cyrille (1989)

Irène Schweizer & Günter Sommer is a live album by pianist Irène Schweizer and drummer Günter Sommer. It was recorded during February 1987 at Rote Fabrik in Zürich, Switzerland, and was released in 1988 by Intakt Records.

In an interview, Schweizer called Sommer "the most melodic drummer," and noted that he "has brought a new element into play - the theatrical." She commented: "Günter plays light and airy. His playing is somewhat dancerly, sometimes folky, European... With Günter, I've always played completely freely."

== Reception ==
Professional ratings
Review scores
Source	Rating
AllMusic	4/5 stars
The Penguin Guide to Jazz	4/4 stars
All About Jazz	4.5/5 stars
Tom Hull – on the Web	A−
The Virgin Encyclopedia of Jazz	3/5 stars

In a review for AllMusic, Thom Jurek called the album "a concert program of thrills, chills, and spills," and wrote: "This is improvisation as song, march, and carnival music from the human soul... a short date, but one that will leave you -- like the audience here -- clamoring for more."

The authors of The Penguin Guide to Jazz Recordings described the connection between the musicians as "dialectical," with a result that is "entirely sympathetic: two voices in conjunction, mutually responsive."

Glenn Astarita of All About Jazz stated that Schweizer and Sommer "take flight into the ozone" on the album, and noted their "buoyant spirit along with an uncanny sense of direction." He remarked: "Modern and traditional concepts coalesce. No, this is not simply a series of rehearsed compositions yet is that of two artists who improvise live onstage not knowing where the next twist, turn or angle will lead them."

== Track listing ==
1. "Dresdener Schlittenfahrt" (Irène Schweizer) – 2:18
2. "Verspielte Zeiten" (Günter Sommer, Irène Schweizer) – 7:21
3. "Monte Marenzo" (Günter Sommer) – 4:51
4. "Auf Dem Feldweg Zur Feldstrasse" (Günter Sommer) – 3:25
5. "Erinnerungen" (Irène Schweizer) – 5:23
6. "Schweitzersommer: 'Der Regen Fliesst Von Oben Nach Unten'" (Günter Sommer, Irène Schweizer) – 19:14

== Personnel ==
- Irène Schweizer – piano
- Günter Sommer – drums, percussion
