= Bib (album) =

Live album by Günter Sommer, Sylvain Kassap, and Didier Levallet
- Released: 2002
- Recorded: July 9 and 11, 1992
- Venues: Workshop Freie Musik, Akademie Der Künste, Berlin
- Genre: Free jazz
- Length: 51:57
- Labels: FMP; CD 51
- Producer: Jost Gebers

Günter Sommer chronology
Merseburger Begegnung (1994)	Bib (2002)	Wokonda (2003)

Bib (also listed as BIB) is a live album by drummer Günter Sommer, saxophonist Sylvain Kassap, and bassist Didier Levallet. It was recorded on July 9 and 11, 1992, at the Workshop Freie Musik held at the Akademie Der Künste in Berlin, and was released in 2002 by FMP.

== Reception ==
Professional ratings
Review scores
Source	Rating
AllMusic	3/5 stars
The Penguin Guide to Jazz	3/4 stars

In a review for AllMusic, François Couture wrote: "the trio alternates between moments of 'pure' free improv and instant grooves and melodies. The integration of both approaches comes naturally, making Bib a light and compelling listen."

The authors of The Penguin Guide to Jazz Recordings stated that the album "very much foregrounds the percussionist's range of instruments... The long pieces are generally more effective and Kassap does some interesting work."

Ken Waxman of JazzWord commented: "BIB harkens back to a time when trans-border musical groups combos were a lot more common than economic or political ones... Most of the time, French champagne and German wurst may not be an ideal meal combination, but the cultural mixture served up on BIB unquestionably makes palatable musical fare here."

== Track listing ==
All music by Günter Sommer, Sylvain Kassap, and Didier Levallet.

1. "Von Dakinis und anderen Göttinnen" – 11:52
2. "Primeur" – 4:20
3. "Auf dem Weg zur Alpe Laguz" – 4:30
4. "Pastouron-Pastourende" – 6:23
5. "Jimmi's ghost" – 3:46
6. "Three for the festival and one for Roland" – 13:34
7. "Trio für Maïté" – 4:50
8. "Vertreibung der Dibbuks" – 2:42

== Personnel ==
- Günter Sommer – drums, percussion
- Sylvain Kassap – soprano saxophone, tenor saxophone, clarinet, bass clarinet
- Didier Levallet – double bass
