= Willisau & Taktlos =

Live album by Irène Schweizer, Fred Anderson, Hamid Drake
- Released: 2007
- Recorded: August 28, 2004 & March 28, 1998
- Venue: Willisau, Zürich
- Genre: Jazz
- Length: 68:21
- Label: Intakt

Irène Schweizer chronology
First Choice: Piano Solo KKL Luzern (2006)	Willisau & Taktlos (2007)	To Whom It May Concern Piano Solo Tonhalle Zürich (2011)

Willisau & Taktlos is an album by Swiss jazz pianist Irène Schweizer with saxophonist Fred Anderson and drummer Hamid Drake, which was released by Intakt Records. The opening piece by the duo Schweizer-Drake was recorded at the Taktlos-Festival Zürich in 1998 and the other three improvisations by the trio were recorded at Jazzfestival Willisau in 2004.

== Reception ==
Professional ratings
Review scores
Source	Rating
AllMusic	4/5 stars
All About Jazz	4/5 stars
Tom Hull – on the Web	A−

In his review for AllMusic, Alain Drouot states "The quieter passages certainly betray her European origins, but are not a distraction from this otherwise energetic, soulful, and pleasurable set."

The All About Jazz review by Nic Jones says "All three players are deeply alert to the integral values of free playing and they mine the seam so deeply that it seems as though their creativity is bottomless."

Ken Waxman of JazzWord noted that Anderson is "energized by the surroundings, and wrote: "Relaxed and inventive in his duo with Schweizer's hunt-and-peck rhythms and kinetic dynamics, Drake's MVP status is confirmed."

Exclaim!'s David Dacks singled out "A Former Dialogue" for praise, writing: "The first ten minutes see Schweizer and Drake sketching along the margins of a shared rhythm, with a lightning fast push and pull. Then both go for the gutbucket and meld one crunchy rhythmic vamp into another. When Anderson joins in, there seems to be an air of familiarity at first... Then Schweizer's skronky South African soul starts giving Anderson different ideas and a truly effective three-way conversation ensues."

== Track listing ==
All compositions by Schweizer, Anderson, Drake except as indicated

1. "A Former Dialogue" (Schweizer-Drake) - 21:59
2. "Trinity" - 28:55
3. "Schwandrake" - 10:16
4. "Willisau" - 7:41

== Personnel ==
- Irène Schweizer - piano
- Fred Anderson - saxophone
- Hamid Drake - drums
