= Spring (Irène Schweizer and Jürg Wickihalder album) =

Live album by Irène Schweizer and Jürg Wickihalder
- Released: 15 September 2014
- Recorded: 6-7 February 2014
- Venue: Loft Köln, Köln, Germany
- Genre: Jazz, free improvisation
- Length: 52:38
- Label: Intakt; CD 234
- Producer: Intakt Records, Patrik Landolt

Spring is a live album of duets by pianist Irène Schweizer and saxophonist Jürg Wickihalder. It was recorded on 6-7 February 2014, at Loft Köln in Köln, Germany, and was released on 15 September 2014 by Intakt Records. The album features two compositions by Thelonious Monk, one by Schweizer, five by Wickihalder, three free improvisations, and, as a closer, Leonello Casucci's "Just a Gigolo".

== Reception ==
Professional ratings
Review scores
Source	Rating
All About Jazz	4.5/5 stars
Jazzwise	4/5 stars
Tom Hull – on the Web	B+

In a review for All About Jazz, John Sharpe wrote: "the overwhelming impression is of two sympathetic partners having a ball... Schweizer lays down a playful rhythmic framework calling on older tropes such as ragtime and barrelhouse at times, which lends a cartoon air to proceedings. Wickihalder matches her every inch of the way, deploying a wide range of expressive tonal effects, but fully integrated into the flow rather than as technique for its own sake."

Marcus O'Dair of Jazzwise called the album "superb," and stated: "The sense is of musicians with nothing to prove... working together to create bracing and beautiful chamber jazz."

Point of Departure's Michael Rosenstein described the album as "a strong one all around," noting the influence of both Monk and Steve Lacy on the music, and commenting: "this duo provides the ultimate homage by drawing on Lacy and Monk's vocabulary to create a personal sound all their own."

Writing for Cadence, Bernie Koenig noted that "the interplay between the two is excellent," and stated that Schweizer's playing is "two handed but melodic, and she is always harmonically inventive."

== Track listing ==
1. "Red Light Crossing Friends" (Wickihalder) – 6:12
2. "Rag Irène" (Schweizer) – 4:39
3. "Köln" (Wickihalder) – 6:40
4. "Green" (Wickihalder/Schweizer) – 3:08
5. "Last Jump" (Wickihalder) – 6:53
6. "The Road" (Wickihalder/Schweizer) – 3:25
7. "White" (Wickihalder) – 6:18
8. "Ugly Beauty" (Thelonious Monk) – 3:17
9. "6243D" (Wickihalder) – 2:03
10. "Trinkle Tinkle" (Thelonious Monk) – 2:45
11. "Blue" (Wickihalder/Schweizer) – 5:18
12. "Just a Gigolo" (Leonello Casucci) – 2:30

== Personnel ==
- Irène Schweizer – piano
- Jürg Wickihalder – tenor saxophone, soprano saxophone
