= Wilde Señoritas =

Live album by Irène Schweizer
- Released: 1977
- Recorded: November 4, 1976
- Venue: Total Music Meeting at the Quartier Latin, Berlin
- Genre: Free improvisation
- Label: FMP; FMP 0330
- Producer: Irène Schweizer, Jost Gebers

Wilde Señoritas is a live solo piano album by Irène Schweizer. Her first solo release, it was recorded on November 4, 1976, at the Total Music Meeting held at the Quartier Latin in Berlin, and was issued in 1977 by the FMP label. In 2002, Intakt Records reissued the album in combination with Hexensabbat.

A recording made earlier in 1976 at the Flöz in Berlin was originally intended to be released under the name Wilde Señoritas, and made it to the test pressing stage. However, upon reviewing it, Schweizer and producer Jost Gebers agreed that the piano was badly out of tune, and the album was re-recorded.

The final section of "Saitengebilde" ("Swing Structure") pays homage to South African saxophonist Dudu Pukwana, and quotes from his tune "Angel Nemali" from the album In the Townships.

== Reception ==
Professional ratings
Review scores
Source	Rating
AllMusic	2/5 stars
The Encyclopedia of Popular Music	3/5 stars
The Penguin Guide to Jazz	3/4 stars
Tom Hull – on the Web	B+

Referring to the influence of Cecil Taylor, the authors of The Penguin Guide to Jazz Recordings called the album "the most Taylorish" of Schweizer's releases, but noted that it is "marked by a melodic warmth which the American wholly lacks."

Bill Smith of Coda stated: "the quality of her improvisation is very high... The music she performs flows in a good continuous way, the movement being more jerky than one is perhaps used to, the element of blackness, which she obviously does not have, is not there, and so perhaps this is not jazz, but Irène Schweizer's improvised music."

JazzWord's Ken Waxman suggested that, on the title track, where Schweizer "highlights individual notes as well as pleasant sub themes" while "leaven[ing] the presentation with some repeated European arpeggios and stride piano suggestions," "her gospelly chord clusters aren't there to show off inhuman speed or brute strength." On the closing track, which "alternates her distinctive rubato inside-piano-percussion with linear playing on the keys, featuring circular note clusters and plenty of wide intervals in the treble clef," Waxman is reminded of Thelonious Monk, "expanding on the mechanics of one of his own compositions."

== Track listing ==
All compositions by Irène Schweizer.

1. "Wilde Señoritas" – 15:50
2. "Saitengebilde (Last Part to Dudu)" – 18:17

== Personnel ==
- Irène Schweizer – piano
