= Welcome Back (Irène Schweizer and Han Bennink album) =

Studio album by Irène Schweizer and Han Bennink
- Released: 16 August 2015
- Recorded: 13–14 April 2015
- Studio: Hardstudios, Winterthur, Switzerland
- Genre: Free Improvisation
- Length: 48:44
- Label: Intakt; CD 254
- Producer: Intakt Records, Patrik Landolt

Welcome Back is an album by pianist Irène Schweizer and drummer Han Bennink. It was recorded on 13–14 April 2015, at Hardstudios in Winterthur, Switzerland, and was released on 16 August 2015 by Intakt Records.

== Reception ==
Professional ratings
Review scores
Source	Rating
All About Jazz	5/5 stars
All About Jazz	4/5 stars
The Free Jazz Collective	5/5 stars
Tom Hull – on the Web	A

In a review for All About Jazz, John Sharpe called the recording "a surprisingly accessible album which fizzes with joie de vivre," and commented: "they conjure outbreaks of irrepressible swing from even the seemingly most abstract surroundings... A relaxed vibe pervades the set, stemming from a perception that each can explore in whatever direction they choose no matter what the starting point... it's two people having fun in a way which everyone can share." AAJ's Glenn Astarita remarked: "The album projects a mélange of styles, colors and quaintly articulated hooks, engineered with blues riffs, classical overtones and fractured theme-building flare-ups... the artists' impenetrable solidarity adds another dimension to their enlivening exchanges and beaming telepathic powers."

Lee Rice Epstein of The Free Jazz Collective wrote: "Schweizer absolutely dominates her instrument. She's a classically expert improviser, and Bennink is a superb partner... [they] seem to breeze through swing, boogie, stride, all filtered through the lens of collaborative free jazz."

Dusted Magazine's Derek Taylor described Welcome Back as "a doozy," one that shows "both in the finest performance light." He stated: "Bennink has a preternatural talent for coaxing out the comedic, even slapstick, sides of his musical colleagues and he brings that precision sense of madcap near-absurdity directly to bear on Schweizer who welcomes it completely from her piano bench."

Writer Raul Da Gama called the album "a work of true genius... a work teetering between the rational and irrational, the comic and tragic, the real and the imagined." He noted: "This is an album of great originality. At times it may sound elusive, more 'disguised' in its melding of the elements, but which always binds the ingredients in extraordinary ways and gives even the uninformed listener a subliminal sense of order."

== Track listing ==
1. "Welcome Back" (Irène Schweizer, Han Bennink) – 6:02
2. "Kit 4" (Han Bennink) – 3:04
3. "Trap 5" (Han Bennink) – 3:56
4. "Free for All" (Irène Schweizer) – 4:43
5. "Meet Me Tonight in Dreamland" (Leo Friedman, Beth Slater Whitson) – 2:14
6. "Verflixt" (Irène Schweizer) – 2:42
7. "Rag" (Irène Schweizer) – 2:52
8. "Bleu Foncé" (Irène Schweizer) – 3:42
9. "Apus Melba" (Han Bennink) – 4:41
10. "Ntyilo, Ntyilo" (Johnny Dyani) – 3:25
11. "Firewood" (Irène Schweizer) – 3:05
12. "To Misha with Love" (Schweizer, Bennink) – 3:21
13. "I Surrender Dear" (Harry Barris) – 2:16
14. "Eronel" (Thelonious Monk) – 1:54

== Personnel ==
- Irène Schweizer – piano
- Han Bennink – drums
