= Fredy Studer =

Swiss percussionist (1948–2022)

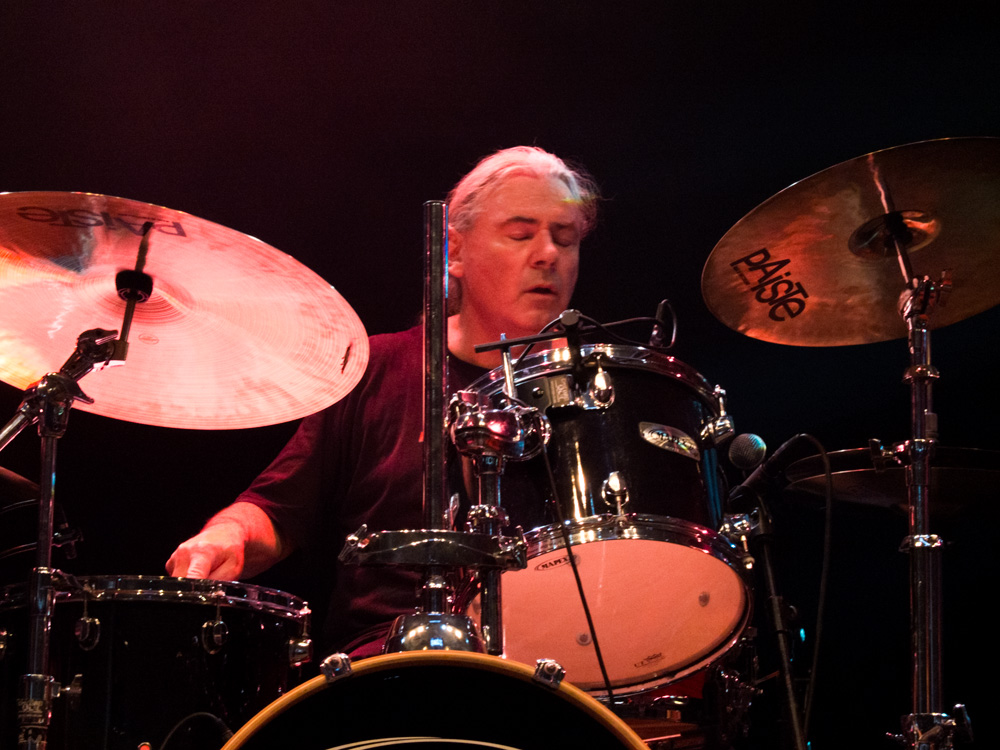
- Studer at the Moers Festival in 2012

Background information
- Born: 16 June 1948; Lucerne, Switzerland
- Died: 22 August 2022 (aged 74)
- Genres: Avant-garde jazz, 20th-century classical, rock, jazz fusion
- Instrument: Drums
- Website: www.fredystuder.ch

Fredy Studer (16 June 1948 – 22 August 2022) was a Swiss drummer and percussionist.

== Biography ==
Fredy Studer was born in Lucerne, Switzerland on 16 June 1948.

In 1972, he founded the jazz fusion quartet OM, with guitarist Christy Doran, saxophonist Urs Leimgruber, and double bassist Bobby Burri, who were all his classmates. The group toured successfully for ten years in Switzerland and Germany.

In the 1980s, Studer played in a trio with Rainer Brüninghaus and Markus Stockhausen; with Stephan Wittwer and Christy Doran in Red Twist & Tuned Arrow; in the group Singing Drums with Pierre Favre, Paul Motian and Nana Vasconcelos; and in the Charlie Mariano-Jasper van 't Hof group.

Studer was an interpreter of 20th-century classical music compositions by Charles Ives, Steve Reich, John Cage, and Edgard Varese, in the percussion ensemble of Robyn Schulkowsky.

Studer has also worked with Joe Henderson, Chick Corea, Jeff Tweedy, Larry Schneider, Dave Holland, Elton Dean, Franco Ambrosetti, George Gruntz, John Zorn, Jack DeJohnette, Elliott Sharp, Pierre Favre, Angelique Kidjo, John Abercrombie, Joachim Kühn, Chris Corsano, Dom Um Romão, Joëlle Léandre, Didier Lockwood, Sunny Murray, Jim O'Rourke, Evan Parker, Marc Ribot, Eberhard Weber, Louis Sclavis, Sonny Sharrock, Irène Schweizer, Bruno Spoerri, Miroslav Vitous, John Tchicai, David Friedman, and Iron Maiden drummer Nicko McBrain.

Studer died on 22 August 2022, at the age of 74.

== Collaboration with Paiste ==
Studer was a key member of Paiste cymbal company's Sound Development department from 1970 to 1978, then as a freelance until 2016. Alongside Robert Paiste, Studer was instrumental in creating and developing all of Paiste's classic cymbals from the 1970s into the 2000s.

Studer was also head of Paiste's Drummer Service department and as such he is credited for signing some of the most important names in drumming history to the company: John Bonham, Jack DeJohnette, Ed Blackwell, Paul Lovens, Carl Palmer, Tony Oxley, Al Foster, Stewart Copeland, Airto Moreira, Paul Motian, Jon Christensen, Sunny Murray, Terry Bozzio, just to name a few.

In 2016, Studer's active membership to Paiste's Sound Development department ended. However he continued his association with the company as an endorser of international status and as an advisor and mentor to the current Sound Development team until his passing.

Studer's swan song with the company was engaging and facilitating Vinnie Colaiuta's switch to Paiste after they had worked together on the “Modern Essentials” Formula 602's development for two years.
