= Irène Schweizer & Han Bennink =

Live album by Irène Schweizer and Han Bennink
- Released: 1996
- Recorded: January 5 and 6, 1995
- Venue: Jazzclub Moods, Zürich, Switzerland
- Genre: Free jazz
- Label: Intakt Records; CD 010
- Producer: Intakt Records

Irène Schweizer & Han Bennink is a live album by pianist Irène Schweizer and drummer Han Bennink. It was recorded in January 1995 at Jazzclub Moods in Zürich, Switzerland, and was released by Intakt Records in 1996.

== Reception ==
Professional ratings
Review scores
Source	Rating
AllMusic	4/5 stars
The Penguin Guide to Jazz	4/4 stars
Tom Hull – on the Web	A
The Virgin Encyclopedia of Jazz	4/5 stars

In a review for AllMusic, Eugene Chadbourne wrote: "This is a recording that finds Han the Man of the dynamite drums 'behaving himself,' as he is fond of saying. He only behaves himself if he finds the situation really warrants it, such as in the case of a pianist playing some really straightforward, honest, and no-jive music... The Swiss Miss Schweizer has absolutely developed her own style, going in the course of her career into piano-pounding and string-scraping free-form improvisation but by the time of this recording pursuing a slightly more mellow, aged-in-the-bottle elegance. Despite his reputation for disruption, Bennink is probably the best drummer possible for music such as this, as he provides swing without clutter and power without any loss of control... The program balances improvised pieces with original tunes, then a touch of drum soloing, then a pair of happy standards to bring down the curtain."

The authors of the Penguin Guide to Jazz Recordings awarded the album 4 stars, and stated that Bennink "is supreme, the ideal foil to Schweizer's full-voiced and pointed delivery... it shows two artists of markedly different temperament... negotiating a comfortable middle ground."

== Track listing ==
1. "Gnash" (Schweizer) – 7:54
2. "Verzweigelt" (Schweizer) – 5:46
3. "Traps I" (Bennink) – 7:30
4. "Eine andere Partie Tischtennis" (Schweizer) – 10:16
5. "Stroef" (Bennink) – 4:44
6. "Just You, Just Me" (Jesse Greer) – 3:44
7. "Zunderobsi" (Schweizer) – 10:54
8. "Just a Gigolo (For Edith!)" (Irving Caesar) – 3:36
9. "Donnerwetter" (Bennink) – 10:32
10. "Hackensack" (Thelonious Monk) – 4:27

== Personnel ==
- Irène Schweizer – piano
- Han Bennink – drums
