= To Whom It May Concern =

To Whom It May Concern may refer to:

- Salutation (greeting), used for opening a letter to an unknown recipient

== Albums ==
- To Whom It May Concern (Bee Gees album), 1972
- To Whom It May Concern, a 2016 album by Blacklite District
- To Whom It May Concern..., a 1991 album by Freestyle Fellowship
- To Whom It May Concern (Lisa Marie Presley album), 2003
- To Whom It May Concern (Nat King Cole album), 1959
- To Whom It May Concern (Splender album), 2002
- To Whom It May Concern (The Pasadenas album), 1988
- To Whom It May Concern (Oscar Lang album), 2018
- To Whom It May Concern: Piano Solo Tonhalle Zürich, a 2011 album by Irène Schweizer
- To Whom This May Concern, a 2026 album by Jill Scott

== Songs ==
- "To Whom It May Concern", a 2011 song by American rock band Journey, from the album Eclipse
- "To Whom It May Concern", a song and single by the British band Million Dead
- "To Whom It May Concern", a song by American rock band Creed, which appears on The Scorpion King soundtrack
- "To Whom It May Concern", a song by American metalcore band Underoath, which appears on their album Define the Great Line
- "To Whom It May Concern", a song by American-Mexican folk musician Rodriguez, from the album Coming from Reality
- "To Whom it May Concern", a song by Yelawolf, a Shady records artist affiliated with southern rap/hip-hop
- "To Whom It May Concern", a song by English new wave band Duran Duran
- "To Whom It May Concern", a song by Australian metalcore band Capture
- "To Whom It May Concern", a song by American alternative rock supergroup A Perfect Circle

== Other uses ==
- To whom it may concern., an independent record label started by Swedish electronic music project iamamiwhoami
- To Whom It May Concern, a 1970s musical by Carol Hall
- "To Whom It May Concern", an anti-war poem by Adrian Mitchell
