= Chicago Piano Solo =

Live album by Irène Schweizer
- Released: 2001
- Recorded: August 16, 2000
- Venue: The Empty Bottle, Chicago
- Genre: Free Jazz
- Label: Intakt Records; CD 065
- Producer: Intakt Records, Irène Schweizer

Chicago Piano Solo is a live solo piano album by Irène Schweizer. It was recorded at The Empty Bottle in Chicago in August 2000, and was released in 2001 by Intakt Records.

== Reception ==
Professional ratings
Review scores
Source	Rating
AllMusic	4/5 stars
The Penguin Guide to Jazz	4/4 stars
Tom Hull – on the Web	B+
The Virgin Encyclopedia of Jazz	3/5 stars

In a review for AllMusic, Steve Loewy wrote: "Another strong effort from Irène Schweizer... By this stage in her career, the pianist is able to stamp her muscular, rhythmic style on a range of influences. You can hear touches of stride, swing, bop, and world jazz, all superimposed by Schweizer's freestyle postmodern interpretations. Whether she performs inside the body of the instrument... or simply plies a percussive repetitiveness... there are original, enlightening delights throughout... An important contribution to her already impressive discography, this recording should help to further cement Irène Schweizer's reputation as one of the most important piano improvisers of her time."

The authors of the Penguin Guide to Jazz Recordings awarded the album 4 stars, and stated: "The excellent sound... highlights the pianist's impeccable touch, the evenness of her attack in high-velocity sequences, and the absolute crispness (and decision) in the way she gets from one phrase to another... the logic of her playing is rare and seemingly invincible: there's nothing here which doesn't seem to fit or which stands as superfluous... another great one from the modest Swiss giant."

Alan Jones of One Final Note commented: "Schweizer is a powerful force in creative music, and she never seems to feel the need to reinvent herself. Her compositions have a high level of staying power. On this record, ideas flourish in an equilibrium set by her choice of material, both notated and improvised."

JazzWord's Ken Waxman called the album an "exceptional production," and noted that it is "the perfect disc to put on when dealing with misguided friends who insist that so-called avant- jazz doesn’t swing."

== Track listing ==
Track 4 by Don Cherry. Remaining tracks by Irène Schweizer.

1. "So Oder So" – 5:07
2. "To The Bottle" – 4:22
3. "Heilige Johanna (For B. B.)" – 9:16
4. "Togetherness One (First Movement)" – 4:41
5. "Stringfever" – 6:51
6. "Circle" – 7:57
7. "Hüben Ohne Drüben" – 2:57
8. "Rag" – 5:27
9. "Roots" – 3:56

== Personnel ==
- Irène Schweizer – piano
