= Celebration (Irène Schweizer and Hamid Drake album) =

Live album by Irène Schweizer and Hamid Drake
- Released: 16 April 2021
- Recorded: July 26, 2019
- Venue: Konfrontationen Nickelsdorf, Jazzgallery Nickelsdorf, Austria
- Genre: Free Improvisation
- Length: 43:52
- Label: Intakt; CD 363

Celebration is a live album by pianist Irène Schweizer and drummer Hamid Drake. It was recorded on 26 July 2019, at Konfrontationen Nickelsdorf, 40th Festival for Free and Improvised Music, held at Jazzgallery Nickelsdorf, Austria, and was released on 16 April 2021 by Intakt Records on the occasion of Schweizer's 80th birthday.

== Reception ==
Professional ratings
Review scores
Source	Rating
All About Jazz	4/5 stars
All About Jazz	3.5/5 stars
The Free Jazz Collective	4/5 stars
Tom Hull – on the Web	A−

In a review for All About Jazz, Troy Dostert called Celebration "a more-than-worthy addition to Schweizer's formidable series of matchups with top-shelf drummers," and wrote: "It's a delight to hear these two on stage together, and it's evident that they're enjoying themselves immensely as well." AAJ's Dan McClenaghan described the album as "a walloping storm of free jazz, rolling in on a hard-hitting percussion mode," and stated: "To those unfamiliar with [Schweizer's] artistry, it can serve as a gateway to a prolific and terrific six decades of recorded freedom and spontaneity."

Nick Ostrum of The Free Jazz Collective commented: "Schweizer and Drake communicate immaculately and, in the process, sound as much like themselves as I have heard them... This is two master musicians from different scenes and generations, who clearly appreciate each other's journeys and strengths, playing some damn fine music."

A reviewer for Jazzwise described Schweizer's mood as "fierce," noting that she "darts, chord-clangs, and unleashes streams of detailed melody against Drake's racing patterns and exclamatory smacks before withdrawing to quiet contemplation."

JazzWord's Ken Waxman stated that the album "confirms the pianist's continued inventiveness and relevance," and remarked: "Energetic and inventive throughout, Schweizer's dexterity in these situations may be because she plays drums herself and intimately knows the kit's capabilities. For his part Drake... makes the session a partnership not a contest, projecting ruffs, press rolls, thumps and pops with a maximum of finesse."

Writing for The Quietus, Peter Margasak commented: "what makes Celebration such a treat is the duo is so telepathically attuned... that its constant recalibration and elaboration of every gambit is accomplished with quicksilver fluidity and unified vision... This performance transmits as much freedom, energy, invention, and joy as anything I've heard all year."

A writer for Best of Jazz stated that the album is "dense, exciting, sometimes joyful, and always extremely captivating, and some parts are just beautiful, as deep and extraordinary as the word 'beautiful' can be." He concluded that it "will make you wish you were there the night it was recorded."

== Track listing ==
"A Former Dialogue" composed by Irène Schweizer and Hamid Drake. Remaining tracks composed by Irène Schweizer.

1. "A Former Dialogue" – 6:26
2. "Hot Sunflowers" – 5:44
3. "The Good Life" – 4:29
4. "Twister" – 5:52
5. "Stringfever" – 5:04
6. "Blues for Crelier" – 3:17
7. "Nickelsdorf Glow" – 2:59
8. "Celebration" – 4:39
9. "Song for Johnny – In memory of Johnny Dyani" – 5:22

== Personnel ==
- Irène Schweizer – piano
- Hamid Drake – drums
