= Ulrichsberg (album) =

Live album by Irène Schweizer and Pierre Favre
- Released: 1 January 2004
- Recorded: 2 May 2003
- Venue: Ulrichsberger Kaleidophon, Austria
- Genre: Jazz
- Label: Intakt Records; CD 084
- Producer: Intakt Records

Ulrichsberg is a live album by pianist Irène Schweizer and drummer Pierre Favre. It was recorded in May 2003 at Ulrichsberger Kaleidophon in Austria, and was released by Intakt Records on 1 January 2004.

Schweizer and Favre first met at the Montreux Jazz Festival in 1966, and have been playing together in a variety of contexts since then.

== Reception ==
Professional ratings
Review scores
Source	Rating
The Guardian	4/5 stars
The Penguin Guide to Jazz	4/4 stars
Tom Hull – on the Web	A−
The Encyclopedia of Popular Music	3/5 stars

In a review for The Guardian, John Fordham wrote: "A hard-hitting pianist who also brings delicacy and shape to unstructured music, Schweizer ripples seamlessly throughout. She lets Favre fill shrewdly scattered open spaces, powers into jazzy pulses, disappears into quiet meditations, broods in booming chords, and delivers as dazzling a display as any in her field... The kind of free jazz that makes the idiom new friends, and likely to be one of the albums of the year."

The authors of the Penguin Guide to Jazz Recordings awarded the album 4 stars, and stated: "one marvels at... the clarity and purpose in the playing. There's no clatter or rhetorical fog; both musicians call on their powers of instinct and intellect to divine a music which sounds deep and complex and at the same moment entirely transparent. Irène says how much she delights in 'our joy in playing', and there's scarcely a moment here where that isn't manifest."

Bill Meyer of Dusted Magazine noted that the album "feels like a shared purpose" and "grows in stature with each spin." He commented: "Each transition seems right and the music is all theirs... Despite its makers' long history working in the nooks and crannies of European improv; despite Schweizer's percussive inside-and-outside piano work; despite Favre's circuitous melodic forays, this is undeniably a jazz record."

== Track listing ==
1. "Twin Dialogue" – 15:14
2. "It's About Time" – 12:02
3. "Ulrich, Ulrich, Der Wagen Bricht! (Dedicated To Peter Kowald)" – 10:18
4. "Unwritten Messages" – 6:56
5. "Nomades" – 8:56
6. "Waltz For Lois" – 5:25

== Personnel ==
- Irène Schweizer – piano
- Pierre Favre – drums
