= ARTE Quartett =

Swiss saxophone quartet

The ARTE Quartett was founded in 1995 by the saxophonists Beat Hofstetter, Sascha Armbruster, Andrea Formenti and Beat Kappeler.

Their musical style consists of contemporary music, jazz, and free improvisation. The four musicians have commissioned many works, often working collaboratively with a composer in developing a composition. The quartet has also arranged and composed original music which they often present at concerts with a thematic focus.

ARTE Quartett has performed concerts with Urs Leimgruber, Hans Feigenwinter, Terry Riley, Michael Riessler, Tim Berne, Fred Frith, Nick Didkovsky, Pierre Favre, Lucas Niggli and Rabih Abou-Khalil.

The quartet tours regularly, plays at various festivals and concert series, and has recorded with various national broadcast companies. Among the festivals and venues where the ARTE Quartett has played are: Centre Culturel Suisse, Paris (F); Meistersinger Festival, Nürnberg (D); Eremitage, Schwaz (A); Münchner Klaviersommer, München (D); Fest der Künste, St. Moritz (CH); Theater, Basel (CH); Centro Culturale Svizzero, Mailand (I); Istituto Svizzero, Rom (I); Melos-Ethos, Bratislava (SLK); Ultraschall, Berlin (D); Jazzfestival, Schaffhausen (CH); Queen Elizabeth Hall, London Jazz Festival (GB); Instant Chavirés, Paris (F); Bimhuis, Amsterdam (NL), FIMAV, Victoriaville (CA); Porgy & Bess, Wien (AT); Stanser Musiktage, Stans (CH); Off-Beat Festival, Basel (CH).

== Discography ==
- Xylem with Urs Leimgruber (STV, 1999)
- Saxophones with Pierre Favre, Michel Godard (Intakt, 2004)
- Assassin Reverie with Terry Riley (New World, 2005)
- Crash Cruise with Lucas Niggli (Intakt, 2007)
- Still Urban with Fred Frith (Intakt, 2009)
- The Big Picture with Fred Frith (Intakt, 2009)
- Different Worlds (Marsyas, 2009)
- Perpetual Delirium with Andreas Schaerer, Wolfgang Zwiauer (Budapest Music Center, 2015)
