= Philipp Schaufelberger =

Swiss jazz guitarist and composer (born 1970)

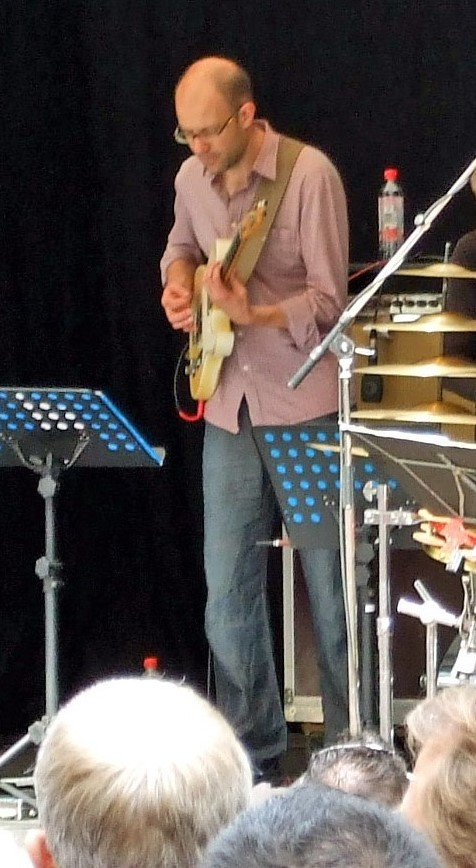
- Philipp Schaufelberger (2007)

Background information
- Born: 30 August 1970 (age 55); Göttingen; Germany
- Genres: Jazz
- Occupation: Musician
- Instrument: guitar
- Website: ps.ignore.net

Philipp Schaufelberger (born 30 August 1970) is a Swiss jazz guitarist and composer.

== Life and works ==
Schaufelberger took classical guitar lessons and studied at the jazz department of Lucerne University of Applied Sciences and Arts. He graduated from Lucerne University with master's degree in 1955. During the education, he was also active in several formations in the field of jazz and related music genres such as Giancarlo Nicolai's guitar orchestra Zap (with Hans Feigenwinter, Bänz Oester and Kaspar Rast), Boxer (with Mich Gerber and Fabian Kuratli) and with Kenny Wheeler's Banff Jazz Orchestra in Canada. In 1994, he became a member of Harald Haerter's quartet. As a member of the quartet, he performed in many festivals in Europe and the USA from 1994 to 1999. Since 1993, he has worked with Daniel Mouthon (Sängers Flug and Air à l'enverre).

He has played in several formations of Pierre Favre since 1998 (Singing Drums, Pierre Favre ensemble, The Bridge with Bänz Oester and in the duet Fleuve in 2006). He also made a tour with Michael Brecker and in 2003 also with Paul Motian's trio.

Since 2000, he has been the core member of Lucas Niggli's Zoom along with Michael Brecker. The group Zoom was expanded with the new members Barry Guy, Peter Herbert or Claudio Puntin and participated in international festivals since 2002. Schaufelberger collaborated also with Jürg Halter and Wolfpack. He participated also in many radio plays for Swiss and German programs. In 2008, he wrote with Jörg Köppl the radio play Das weisse Lauschen.
