= Irène Schweizer & Pierre Favre =

Live album by Irène Schweizer and Pierre Favre
- Released: 1992
- Recorded: February 16 and 17, 1990
- Venue: Restaurant Schweizerbund, Bern, Switzerland
- Genre: Free Improvisation
- Length: 59:32
- Label: Intakt; CD 009

Irène Schweizer & Pierre Favre is a live album by pianist Irène Schweizer and drummer Pierre Favre. It was recorded on February 16 and 17, 1990, at Restaurant Schweizerbund in Bern, Switzerland, and was released in 1992 by Intakt Records.

In an interview, Schweizer reflected on her long-term relationship with Favre, stating: "Playing with Pierre has an intuitive sureness... Because of our collaboration over decades, we have a broad basis of common musical experiences that of course are useful in our improvisation. It has been a long friendship: even when we haven't seen each other for a long time, as soon as we play together, everything that went before is again present."

== Reception ==
Professional ratings
Review scores
Source	Rating
AllMusic	4.5/5 stars
The Penguin Guide to Jazz	4/4 stars
Tom Hull – on the Web	A
The Virgin Encyclopedia of Jazz	4/5 stars

In a review for AllMusic, Thom Jurek wrote: "the sheer musicality of this pair is staggering... This is a topnotch live set that reveals piano and drum pairings are not always percussive pound-a-thons."

The authors of The Penguin Guide to Jazz Recordings described Favre as a "melodic" player, "moving round the kit much as [Schweizer] moves across the keyboard," and commented: "the level of interaction is such that one almost seems to be hearing a meta-instrument, a source of sound which is neither one voice nor the other, but a genuine synthesis of the two."

== Track listing ==
Composed by Irène Schweizer and Pierre Favre.

1. "Cache-Cache" – 4:38
2. "Ein Schnelles Verfahren" – 4:54
3. "Miramara" – 3:30
4. "Bongiorno Giacomo" – 7:44
5. "Fulmination" – 2:55
6. "Flying Over the Limmat" – 13:03
7. "Ein Ton Kommt Selten Allein..." – 3:35
8. "Moving Time" – 5:04
9. "What Is It You Wanted?" – 5:25
10. "First Wave - Last Word" – 5:07

== Personnel ==
- Irène Schweizer – piano
- Pierre Favre – drums, percussion
