= Moholo =

Moholo is a surname found in South Africa. Notable people with the surname include:

- Louis Moholo (1940–2025), South African jazz drummer
- Solly Moholo (1959–2024), South African gospel singer and songwriter

== See also ==
- Irène Schweizer & Louis Moholo, a 1987 live album
