= The Big Picture (Fred Frith and ARTE Quartett album) =

Studio album by Fred Frith and ARTE Quartett
- Released: 2009
- Recorded: January 2008
- Studio: Swiss Radio DRS2, Zürich, Switzerland
- Genre: Avant-garde jazz; Improvisation
- Length: 63:09
- Label: Intakt Records
- Producer: Intakt Records

Fred Frith and ARTE Quartett chronology
Still Urban (2009)	The Big Picture (2009)

Fred Frith chronology
Still Urban (200)	The Big Picture (2009)	Impur II (2009)

The Big Picture is a 2009 avant-garde jazz studio album by English guitarist and composer Fred Frith and the Swiss-based ARTE Quartett. It was recorded in January 2008 at Swiss Radio DRS2 in Zürich, Switzerland, and was released in 2009 by Intakt Records, together with Frith and the ARTE Quartett's first collaborative album, Still Urban, which was also recorded in January 2008 at Swiss Radio DRS2.

The Big Picture comprises two suites of music, The Big Picture for saxophone quartet with two improvising soloists, composed by Frith in 2000, and Freedom in Fragments for saxophone quartet, composed by Frith in 1994. Freedom in Fragments was originally written for the Rova Saxophone Quartet and was performed by them on Frith's 2002 solo album Freedom in Fragments.

Frith does not perform on The Big Picture.

== Reception ==
In a review at All About Jazz, Marc Medwin stated that The Big Picture illustrates Frith's "fascinating approach to composition". He called the ARTE Quartett's playing "virtuosic", especially in their handling of the Freedom in Fragments suite. Medwin found "Song and Dance" "much livelier and ... more fluid" than the original Rova Saxophone Quartet's interpretation, and "Red Rag" "particularly infectious".

Reviewing the album in Jazzwise, Duncan Heining described The Big Picture suite as "a series of miniatures" that is "remarkably concise, focused and magnificently performed". He said the composition is reminiscent of Varèse or Xenakis. Heining called Freedom in Fragments "an essay on the subject of musical freedom" that "twists and turns across the landscape". He opined that the music is "[d]emanding and challenging" and calls for "repeated listening".

Michael Rosenstein wrote in a review of the album in Cadence that The Big Picture suite is made up of six short pieces that "act as episodic juxtapositions of the extremes of timbre and range of the saxophones". He said there is "plenty of textural variety" and occasionally melodies surface. In Freedom in Fragments Rosenstein complimented the quartet's handling of Frith's "themes and tight arrangements", but did feel that the constraints of the composition leaves "little room for the group to stretch things much".

Writing in The Wire, Julian Cowley called the Big Picture suite "a lively negotiation" between the Arte Quartett and the "less orderly improvised responses" of the guest pianist and drummer. In Freedom in Fragments he said the quartet "explore[s] unconventional techniques", plays "folksy" and "noir melancholy" tunes, and each member contributes an improvised solo. But Cowley found that, on the whole, the music did not "mov[e] or stimulat[e]" him. He stated that "saxophone quartets leave me with an uncomfortable sense of the sentimental convenience of family groups".

== Track listing ==
All tracks are written by Fred Frith.

The Big Picture
No.	Title	Length
1.	"Part 1"	2:04
2.	"Part 2"	2:49
3.	"Part 3"	2:40
4.	"Part 4"	2:06
5.	"Part 5"	2:25
6.	"Part 6"	1:39

Freedom in Fragments
No.	Title	Length
7.	"Introduction: The Power of Prayer"	1:50
8.	"Some Assembly Required" (soloist: B. Hofstetter)	1:45
9.	"Hopscotch (for John Zorn)"	4:52
10.	"Confess"	0:15
11.	"Song and Dance"	4:20
12.	"Void Where Prohibited" (soloist: S. Armbruster)	2:31
13.	"Rosali’s Song"	6:10
14.	"Red Rag"	3:58
15.	"Significant Restrictions Apply" (soloist: A. Formenti)	1:50
16.	"Boyan’s Problem"	4:07
17.	"Kick It"	3:48
18.	"Nostalgia"	2:01
19.	"Batteries Not Included" (soloist: B. Kappeler)	1:44
20.	"T. Square Park Lark (for Frank Zappa)"	8:32
21.	"The Power of Prayer: Coda"	1:43
Total length:		63:09

Source: CD liner notes, Fred Frith discography.

== Personnel ==
- ARTE Quartett
  - Beat Hofstetter – soprano saxophone
  - Sascha Armbruster – alto saxophone
  - Andrea Formenti – tenor saxophone
  - Beat Kappeler – baritone and alto saxophones
- Guests on The Big Picture suite
  - Katharina Weber – piano
  - Lucas Niggli – drums

Source: CD liner notes, Fred Frith discography.

=== Production and artwork ===
- Recorded at Swiss Radio DRS2, Zürich, Switzerland by Ron Kurz in January 2009
- Edited and mixed at Guerrilla Recording, Oakland, California in March 2008
- Mastered at Headless Buddha Mastering Labs, Oakland by Myles Boisen in June 2008
- Cover art by Heike Liss
- Cover design by Jonas Schoder
- Produced by Intakt Records

Source: CD liner notes.
