= To Whom It May Concern: Piano Solo Tonhalle Zürich =

Live album by Irène Schweizer
- Released: 1 January 2012
- Recorded: 11 April 2011
- Venue: Tonhalle, Zürich, Switzerland
- Genre: Free Improvisation
- Label: Intakt; CD 200
- Producer: Peter Bürli

Irène Schweizer chronology
First Choice: Piano Solo KKL Luzern (2006)	To Whom It May Concern: Piano Solo Tonhalle Zürich (2012)	Live in Zürich (2013)

To Whom It May Concern: Piano Solo Tonhalle Zürich is a live solo piano album by Irène Schweizer. It was recorded on 11 April 2011, at Tonhalle, Zürich in Zürich, Switzerland, in celebration of the pianist's 70th birthday, and was released on 1 January 2012 by Intakt Records. The music includes originals plus tunes composed by Jimmy Giuffre, Carla Bley, Thelonious Monk, and Dollar Brand.

== Reception ==
Professional ratings
Review scores
Source	Rating
The Guardian	4/5 stars
Tom Hull – on the Web	B+

In a review for The Guardian, John Fordham wrote: "Schweizer has often been saddled with comparisons to Cecil Taylor, and there are certainly passages here in which she explodes into torrential, Tayloresque maestroms – but there's a lot more besides, too."

Point of Departure's Bill Shoemaker stated that the album "is as incisive in its survey of Irène Schweizer's art as it is comprehensive," and commented: "Not only does she demonstrate great stylistic and expressive range... she manages to neatly fold all of this material into an anniversary concert without diminishing the fact that her music continues to evolve."

Bernie Koenig of Cadence called the album "one really great recording," and noted that although Schweizer "plays in a variety of styles," ranging from "ragtime, to the second Viennese school and Elliott Carter, to Cecil Taylor," "she makes these influences hers." He concluded: "Highly Recommended."

Writing for Paris Transatlantic, Massimo Ricci remarked: "the pianist questions the very meaning of the term 'interpretation', turning known quantities into utterly individual expression, a combination of concrete philosophy and extrasensory intuition... The older she gets, the better she plays."

Ken Waxman of The New York City Jazz Record called the recording "One of those rare celebratory concerts that lives up to expectations," stating that it "convincingly exposes every facet of her talents," demonstrating "the iconoclastic pianist's command of her chosen idiom."

== Track listing ==
1. "To Whom It May Concern" (Irène Schweizer) – 10:48
2. "Hüben Ohne Drüben" (Irène Schweizer) – 4:40
3. "Scratching at the Tonhalle" (Irène Schweizer) – 4:52
4. "Jungle Beat III" (Irène Schweizer) – 3:05 / "The Train and the River" (Jimmy Giuffre) – 2:45
5. "Homage to Don Cherry" (Irène Schweizer) – 3:59
6. "Ida Lupino" (Carla Bley) – 3:49
7. "Four In One" (Thelonious Monk) – 2:52
8. "Bleu Foncé" (Irène Schweizer) – 4:18
9. "Xaba" (Dollar Brand) – 4:25
10. "Final Ending" (Irène Schweizer) – 5:51

== Personnel ==
- Irène Schweizer – piano
