= Hexensabbat =

Live album by Irène Schweizer
- Released: 1978
- Recorded: October 8 and 10, 1977
- Venue: Townhall Charlottenburg, Berlin and FMP-Studio, Berlin
- Genre: Free Jazz
- Label: FMP; FMP 0500
- Producer: Jost Gebers

Hexensabbat (Witches' Sabbath) is a solo piano album by Irène Schweizer. Two tracks were recorded live at the Townhall Charlottenburg in Berlin on October 8, 1977, and the remaining tracks were recorded at the FMP-Studio in Berlin on October 10, 1977. The album was released in 1978 by FMP. In 2002, Intakt Records reissued the album in combination with Wilde Señoritas.

== Reception ==
Professional ratings
Review scores
Source	Rating
AllMusic	3/5 stars
The Penguin Guide to Jazz	3.5/4 stars
Tom Hull – on the Web	B+
The Virgin Encyclopedia of Jazz	3/5 stars

In a review for AllMusic, Eugene Chadbourne wrote that the album "takes a well-used, and quite practical approach of combining live and studio performances. From the former event comes 'Rapunzel...Rapunzel', one of the performances from this pianist that approaches masterpiece status... [She] has a rowdy sense of humour... not only present in titles such as 'Dykes on Bykes' but in some of the chances she takes as an improviser."

Ken Waxman of JazzWord stated that "Folks looking for the roots of Schweizer's mature style as well as some fine music will easily find it on this set," and noted that Schweizer "rotates her presentation between sections of flowering European classicism to periods when it sounds as if she's panning for gold inside the instrument. At times it appears as if we're hearing a duet between keyboard expression on one side and crashing cymbals and balls percussively flung onto the copper and steel strings on the other."

== Track listing ==
All compositions by Irène Schweizer.

1. "Hexensabbat" – 8:54
2. "Rapunzel…Rapunzel…!" – 11:34
3. "Chabis" – 2:21
4. "Choix Mixed" – 4:51
5. "Dykes On Bykes" – 4:17
6. "Lavender Valse" – 3:09
7. "Monkey Woman" – 3:50
8. "Baba-Rum" – 4:01

== Personnel ==
- Irène Schweizer – piano
