= The Storming of the Winter Palace (album) =

Live album by Irène Schweizer
- Released: 1988
- Recorded: May 18, 1986 and March 25, 1988
- Venue: International-New-Jazz-Festival-Moers (1986), Taktlos-Festival at Rote Fabrik, Zürich (1988)
- Genre: Jazz
- Label: Intakt Records; 003

The Storming of the Winter Palace is a live album by pianist Irène Schweizer. It was recorded in May 1986 and March 1988, and was released by Intakt Records on LP in 1988, and on CD in 2000. On the album, Schweizer is joined by vocalist Maggie Nicols, trombonist George Lewis, bassist Joëlle Léandre, and drummer Günter Sommer.

== Reception ==
Professional ratings
Review scores
Source	Rating
The Penguin Guide to Jazz	4/4 stars
All About Jazz	3.5/5 stars

The authors of the Penguin Guide to Jazz Recordings awarded the album four stars, stating that it "documents a group with formidable powers," and commenting: "Schweizer is very much the key element, assembling and unpicking a series of small-scale themes and ideas like some intellectual tricoteuse. Maggie Nicols' ability to break down narrative song into its constituent elements, semantic nonsense, and still leave you feeling that you've heard a story and been serenaded as well continues to amaze, as does George Lewis's ability to make even a disassembled trombone sound like the most musical thing on the planet... Sommer is not so much a minimalist as a miniaturist, able to invest tiny ideas with enormous significance... Léandre rumbles away in the background... this represents a wonderful documentation of an important group."

Writing for All About Jazz Glenn Astarita remarked: "The Storming of The Winter Palace is a showstopper as this writer often thought of the visual aspects; hence, a video of this performance would have been an added treat as the music and overall intensity alludes to one heck of a live performance!"

In an article for Morning Star Online, Chris Searle noted that the album featured "three women - a Swiss pianist, a Scottish singer and a French bassist - and two men, a German drummer and an African American trombonist born in Chicago," and wrote: "Audacity here certainly, and brilliant jazz musicianship too - mostly in a free ensemble setting, stirred up into a relentless excitation by the five revolutionary improvising spirits."

== Track listing ==
1. "Now And Never" (Schweizer, Léandre) - 26:10
2. "The Storming Of The Winter Palace" (Nicols, Schweizer) - 10:07
3. "Living On The Edge" (Lewis, Sommer) - 15:00
- Track 1 recorded May 18, 1986 at the International-New-Jazz-Festival-Moers by Westdeutscher Rundfunk (WDR); tracks 2 and 3 recorded March 25, 1988 at the Taktlos-Festival, Rote Fabrik, Zürich

== Personnel ==
- Irène Schweizer – piano
- Maggie Nicols – vocals
- George Lewis – trombone
- Joëlle Léandre – bass
- Günter Sommer – drums

== Production ==
- Peter Pfister – engineer
