= Live! (Irène Schweizer and Joey Baron album) =

Live album by Irène Schweizer and Joey Baron
- Released: September 15, 2017
- Recorded: November 27, 2015
- Venue: Unerhört! Festival, Rote Fabrik, Zürich, Switzerland
- Genre: Jazz
- Length: 50:14
- Label: Intakt; CD 293
- Producer: Patrik Landolt

Irène Schweizer chronology
Welcome Back (2015)	Live! (2017)

Joey Baron chronology
Just Listen (2013)	Live! (2017)	Now You Hear Me (2018)

Live! is a live album by pianist Irène Schweizer and drummer Joey Baron which was recorded in Switzerland in 2015 and released by the Intakt label in 2017.

== Reception ==
Professional ratings
Review scores
Source	Rating
All About Jazz	3.5/5 stars
DownBeat	4/5 stars
Tom Hull – on the Web	B+

In a review for DownBeat, Giovanni Russonello wrote: "there's not a dull moment. On 'String Fever,' Schweizer plays inside the piano, clacking the instrument's frame and dampening strings as she plucks them; Baron responds with thick clouds, drawn by strokes along the edges of his cymbals... Other times... it's Cecil Taylor who looms as Schweizer lets some of her natural cogency spread out and wander. Like Taylor, she can achieve a remarkable independence between her left and right hands in the course of a free improvisation, each projecting a crisp and full-bodied sound, full of rich and bluesy ardor."

Raul Da Gama commented: "The partnership is magical... the quintessential ping and swish of drumheads on the brass of cymbals and the rattle and hum of those same sticks, mallets and brushes triggers a kind of wild alchemy between pianist and drummer. Pianistic colours swirl and blend in with percussion colours; new textures thicken and turn brittle, then melt again... the result is not two distinct instruments, but like the proverbial philharmonic orchestra playing in unison, a wall of sound by some kind of sonic beast that is unleashed by the bristling genius of these two musicians."

Writing for The Village Voice, Michael J. Agovino stated: "Schweizer's single-minded artistic vision is apparent on... Live!... Featuring a dynamic attack that can be ferocious and distinctly percussive (she plays drums herself, though not publicly anymore), then nimble and searching, it's a testament to the subtle traditionalism that's always lurked on the margins of her playing."

Derek Taylor, in a review for Dusted Magazine, remarked: "Live! excises extraneous uncertainties with its succinct title, letting listeners know exactly the sort of recording they’re in store for... Schweizer's made a veritable cottage industry out of duets with drummers under the auspices of Intakt. This hit with Baron registers right up there with the best of them."

On Jazz Views Chris Baber wrote "It can be easy to forget the breadth of piano styles that Schweizer employs. There are, in her solos, whole histories of jazz piano, as well as sizable hints of folk-inspired Classical piano suites. But, above all, it is the lightening [sic] fast wit and imagination that she evolves completely defined pattern of kaleidoscopic notes that defines her playing and makes her contribution to the art of jazz piano so unique. What makes this is recording a classic in the improvised playing is the wonderful rapport that she strikes with Baron, whose playing is every bit as inventive and invigorating as Schweizer's".

== Track listing ==
All compositions by Irène Schweizer except where noted

1. "Free for All" – 7:59
2. "Up the Ladder" (Joey Baron) – 12:22
3. "String Fever" – 7:59
4. "Jungle Beat II" – 10:49
5. "Saturdays" (Baron) – 4:14
6. "Blues for Crelier" – 3:34
7. "The Open Window" (Baron) – 3:57

== Personnel ==
- Irène Schweizer – piano
- Joey Baron – drums
