= Many and One Direction =

Live album by Irène Schweizer
- Released: 1996
- Recorded: April 4, 1996
- Venue: Alte Kirche Boswil, Switzerland
- Genre: Free Jazz
- Label: Intakt Records; CD 044
- Producer: Intakt Records

Many and One Direction is a live solo piano album by Irène Schweizer. It was recorded at Alte Kirche Boswil in Switzerland in April 1996, and was released later that year by Intakt Records.

== Reception ==
Professional ratings
Review scores
Source	Rating
AllMusic	4/5 stars
The Penguin Guide to Jazz	3.5/4 stars
All About Jazz	4.5/5 stars
Tom Hull – on the Web	A−
The Virgin Encyclopedia of Jazz	3/5 stars

In a review for AllMusic, Steve Loewy wrote: "This solo recording... is a change of pace for Schweizer. The intensity is turned down a notch or two, the emphasis is on sound, color, and structure, but the results are somehow hardly less exciting... her technique is still at the top of her game... and her earlier fans and followers will not be disappointed -- though they may be a touch surprised."

The authors of the Penguin Guide to Jazz Recordings awarded the album 3½ stars, and stated: "The title says it all: a critical moment in a career which seems to have combined an eclectic range of ideas with an absolute solidity of purpose. This solo record is beautifully engineered and played with an immaculate touch... this is an immensely strong performance."

Writing for All About Jazz, Glenn Astarita commented: "Here, the critically acclaimed pianist pursues various angles via her noteworthy affinity for rhythmic movement and altogether penetrating execution as each piece is strikingly unique... Many and One Direction offers the listener a truly rousing glimpse of this remarkable musician. Don't let this one slip by... Highly recommended."

== Track listing ==
Track 6 by Carla Bley. Track 13 by Thelonious Monk. Remaining tracks by Irène Schweizer.

1. "Contours" – 4:43
2. "Hüben Wie Drüben" – 5:17
3. "May Day" – 5:55
4. "Jungle Beats" – 5:34
5. "Nobile" – 5:00
6. "Ictus" – 2:42
7. "Last Call" – 2:34
8. "Im Zwielicht" – 7:47
9. "Sisyphos" – 3:56
10. "Saitenpfade" – 3:41
11. "Heat Flushes" – 3:52
12. "Bleu Fonc" – 3:44
13. "Chordially" – 2:15

== Personnel ==
- Irène Schweizer – piano
