= Still Urban =

Studio album by Fred Frith and ARTE Quartett
- Released: 2009
- Recorded: January 2008
- Studio: Swiss Radio DRS2, Zürich, Switzerland
- Genre: Avant-garde jazz; Improvisation
- Length: 46:31
- Label: Intakt Records
- Producer: Intakt Records

Fred Frith and ARTE Quartett chronology
Still Urban (2009)	The Big Picture (2009)

Fred Frith chronology
To Sail, to Sail (2008)	Still Urban (2009)	The Big Picture (2009)

Still Urban is a 2009 avant-garde jazz studio album by English guitarist and composer Fred Frith and the Swiss-based ARTE Quartett. It was recorded in January 2008 at Swiss Radio DRS2 in Zürich, Switzerland, and was released in 2009 by Intakt Records, together with Frith and the ARTE Quartett's second collaborative album, The Big Picture, which was also recorded in January 2008 at Swiss Radio DRS2.

Still Urban is a suite of music for electric guitar, saxophone quartet, radio and ambient recordings that was composed by Frith in 2004.

== Reception ==
In a review of Still Urban at All About Jazz, Marc Medwin stated that while he sometimes found Frith's chamber music "not always ... satisfying", the inclusion of improvised segments on the album "keep[s] textures interesting and paces changing". Medwin said the ARTE Quartett's playing is "virtuosic", and called Frith's compositional techniques "fascinating", especially when he mixes "multi-colored sonority with extended instrumental techniques".

Michael Rosenstein wrote in a review of the album in Cadence that Frith's composition demonstrates the "accomplished flexibility" of the ARTE Quartett. He said the use of field recordings and the "jagged textures" of Frith's guitar never dominates the mix, but provides a platform for the quartet's "warm reed sonorities". Reviewing the album in Jazzwise, Duncan Heining said that Frith uses the composition to explore the "fragmenting urban landscape". The music can be "harsh" at times, but has melodies that feel "paradoxically pastoral". Heining added that the quartet produces "odd textures and colours" which evokes a "dream-like beauty".

Julian Cowley wrote in The Wire that the presence of field recordings of city streets in Still Urban "create[s] a sense of urbanity that at any moment might be ruptured by discord". He said the saxophones tend to sound like an accordion, and while the guitar blends in, it also disrupts the harmony from time to time, creating "dramatic encounters". But Cowley found that, on the whole, the music did not "mov[e] or stimulat[e]" him. He stated that "saxophone quartets leave me with an uncomfortable sense of the sentimental convenience of family groups", and suspected that "Frith’s musical energy now flows through channels that have hardened and narrowed somewhat since the imaginative thrill of his early pathfinding guitar solos and his early adventures in composition."

== Track listing ==
All tracks are written by Fred Frith.

Still Urban Part 1-9
No.	Title	Length
1.	"Part 1: Landscape With or Without Edges"	7:55
2.	"Part 2: Door Won't Open, Door Won't Close"	3:02
3.	"Part 3: Nervous When I Turned"	6:48
4.	"Part 4: Family Ties"	6:03
5.	"Part 5: Science to Someone Living"	4:18
6.	"Part 6: Glass and Mirror Cut to Size"	6:39
7.	"Part 7: Everywhere Hastily We Followed"	2:59
8.	"Part 8: Two Blinkings of an Eyelid"	1:27
9.	"Part 9: Near Future Faith"	7:20
Total length:		46:31

Source: CD liner notes, Fred Frith discography.

== Personnel ==
- Fred Frith – electric guitar
- ARTE Quartett
  - Beat Hofstetter – soprano saxophone
  - Sascha Armbruster – alto saxophone
  - Andrea Formenti – tenor saxophone
  - Beat Kappeler – baritone and alto saxophones

Source: CD liner notes, Fred Frith discography.

=== Production and artwork ===
- Recorded at Swiss Radio DRS2, Zürich, Switzerland by Ron Kurz in January 2009
- Edited and mixed at Guerrilla Recording, Oakland, California in March 2008
- Mastered at Headless Buddha Mastering Labs, Oakland by Myles Boisen in June 2008
- Cover art by Heike Liss
- Cover design by Jonas Schoder
- Produced by Intakt Records

Source: CD liner notes.
