= Tamia (disambiguation) =

Tamia (born 1975) is the stage name of Canadian singer, songwriter, producer, and actress Tamia Marie Washington.

Tamia may also refer to:

- Tamia (album), 1998 debut album by Canadian singer Tamia
- Tamia Valmont (born 1947), French composer and singer
- Tamia "Coop" Cooper, a fictional character portrayed by Bre-Z on the sports drama All American

== See also ==
- Palladis Tamia, a 1598 book written by Francis Meres
- Tamias, a genus of chipmunks
