= Berlin Djungle =

Live album by Brötzmann Clarinet Project
- Released: 1987
- Recorded: November 4, 1984
- Venues: JazzFest Berlin, Delphi Theater, Berlin
- Genre: Free jazz
- Length: 47:30
- Labels: FMP; 1120
- Producer: Jost Gebers

Peter Brötzmann chronology
| Pica Pica (1984) | Berlin Djungle (1987) | Go-No-Go (1987) |

Berlin Djungle is a live album by the Brötzmann Clarinet Project, led by Peter Brötzmann, and featuring an eleven-piece band that was assembled for a concert at JazzFest Berlin. Documenting a performance of a single 47-minute work, it was recorded on November 4, 1984, at the Delphi Theater in Berlin, and was released on vinyl in 1987 by FMP/Free Music Production. In 2004, it was reissued on CD by Atavistic Records as part of their Unheard Music Series. On the album, Brötzmann is joined by clarinetists Tony Coe, J.D. Parran, Ernst-Ludwig Petrowsky, Louis Sclavis, and John Zorn, trumpeter Toshinori Kondo, trombonists Alan Tomlinson and Johannes Bauer, double bassist William Parker, and drummer Tony Oxley.

== Reception ==
Professional ratings
Review scores
| Source | Rating |
|---|---|
| All About Jazz | 4.5/5 stars |
| AllMusic | 3/5 stars |
| The Penguin Guide to Jazz | 3.5/4 stars |
| Tom Hull – on the Web | B+ |
| The Virgin Encyclopedia of Jazz | 3/5 stars |

In a review for All About Jazz, Jerry D'Souza wrote: "The lineup has some of the best free thinkers and instant improvisers who go without hesitation into the realm of the unknown. All draw the listener into a vortex that spins, at first like a snake charmer casting a hypnotic spell that gradually builds depth and a trenchant power." AAJ's Andrey Henkin described the album as "both dense and sparse, delicate and bludgeoning, laser-beam tight and searchlight-wandering, an unrepeatable exhortation of something Benny Goodman might have nightmares about." AAJ writer Clifford Allen called Berlin Djungle "a highly melodic work, yet still process-oriented," and noted: "this process is additive, featuring juxtapositions of woody textures and shrill overblowing or lithe clarinet lines and dense masses of sound from bass and trombones... and it wouldn't be Brötzmann without madcap theatrics."

The authors of The Penguin Guide to Jazz Recordings remarked: "This is certainly still within the realms of 'European free', but these two large slabs of music... have a logic and timbre that somehow does move closer to American models. The ensemble is full of star names... and that quality is reflected episodically through the piece."

Exclaim!'s Eric Hill stated: "Sadly the energy and mayhem of the show is not effectively captured on the muddy master recording... While the album is undeniably important as an extant document, it disappoints on the level of listening enjoyment."

Jay Collins of One Final Note noted that the album "presents a format that will delight Brötzmann's large group enthusiasts with numerous spirited, bombastic moments mixed with prosaic, even melodic journeys..., though the massive sound clusters tend to be those that stick to one's brain."

Writing for Dusted Magazine, Charlie Wilmoth commented: "The most important turning points on Berlin Djungle always seem to happen when the excellent Oxley starts or stops playing. Oxley plays with such density and propulsion here that he seems to lead other players into the chaos like a father teaching his son how to swim by tossing him into the water. Once everyone's splashing around, the results are as wild as almost anything in free improv at the time, even with clarinets rather than saxophones."

In an article for JazzWord, Ken Waxman called the album "a singular experience" that "produces some memorable textures and must be admired for Brötzmann's decision to broaden his compositional range."

== Track listing ==
Composed by Peter Brötzmann.

1. "What a Day - Part 1" – 24:37
2. "What a Day - Part 2" – 23:15

== Personnel ==
- Peter Brötzmann – clarinet, tenor saxophone, tarogato
- Tony Coe – clarinet
- J.D. Parran – clarinet
- Ernst-Ludwig Petrowsky – clarinet
- Louis Sclavis – clarinet, bass clarinet
- John Zorn – clarinet, mouthpieces
- Toshinori Kondo – trumpet
- Hannes Bauer – trombone
- Alan Tomlinson – trombone
- William Parker – double bass
- Tony Oxley – drums
