= Irène Schweizer & Louis Moholo =

Live album by Irène Schweizer and Louis Moholo
- Released: 1987
- Recorded: November 8, 1986
- Venue: International Jazz Festival, Zürich, Switzerland
- Genre: Free improvisation
- Length: 39:14
- Label: Intakt; CD 006
- Producer: Intakt Records

Irène Schweizer chronology
Die V-Mann Suite (1981)	Irène Schweizer & Louis Moholo (1987)	Irène Schweizer & Günter Sommer (1988)

Irène Schweizer & Louis Moholo is a live album by pianist Irène Schweizer and drummer Louis Moholo. It was recorded on November 8, 1986, at the International Jazz Festival in Zürich, Switzerland, and was released in 1987 by Intakt Records.

In an interview, Schweizer stated that the album, which features two compositions by South African saxophonist Dudu Pukwana, as well as a tribute to bassist Johnny Dyani, "is an homage to the South African musicians exiled in Europe whom I got to know at the Africana and later ran into on a regular basis when I lived for a few years in London." She praised Moholo's "rhythmicality," and commented: "This amazing drive has something trance-like about it. I compare Louis with Elvin Jones, when Jones was playing with John Coltrane."

== Reception ==
Professional ratings
Review scores
Source	Rating
AllMusic	4.5/5 stars
The Penguin Guide to Jazz	3/4 stars
All About Jazz	5/5 stars
Tom Hull – on the Web	B+

In a review for AllMusic, Thom Jurek called the music "heavenly," and "one of the high points in both artists' careers." He wrote: "the communication and sheer magic that exists between these two percussionists (Schweizer often plays the piano the way it was designed) is almost unparalleled in the music on disc or vinyl."

Glenn Astarita of All About Jazz stated that the album features "bouncy melodies, introspective interplay and narratives which speak loud and clear," and remarked: "Ms. Schweizer and Mr. Moholo generally cavort in unison as Moholo maintains the feverish pulse... The worldly approach and non-stop action is at times breathtaking.... It could not have been scripted any better! Highly recommended!!"

Author Todd S. Jenkins described the album as "a gorgeous collaboration," and commented: "Pukwana's tune 'Angel' is given a passionate reading here by two big fans. A tribute to bassist Johnny Dyani is similarly heartfelt, and 'Free Mandela!' carries all the drive and determination that the sentiment bore when it was pertinent."

== Track listing ==
1. "Free Mandela!" (Irene Schweizer, Louis Moholo) – 6:05
2. "Mra" (Dudu Pukwana, Irene Schweizer, Louis Moholo) – 7:47
3. "Angel" (Dudu Pukwana) – 5:20
4. "Exile: Song for Johnny Dyani / Africa(na) Memories / We Will Win the War" (Irene Schweizer, Louis Moholo) – 19:58

== Personnel ==
- Irène Schweizer – piano
- Louis Moholo – percussion, voice
