= Solo Piano =

Solo Piano may refer to:

- Solo Piano (Jaki Byard album), 1969
- Solo Piano (Toshiko Akiyoshi album), 1971
- Solo Piano (Tommy Flanagan album), 1974
- Solo Piano (Phineas Newborn, Jr. album), 1975
- Solo Piano Album, a 1975 recording by jazz pianist Don Pullen
- Solo Piano (Philip Glass album), 1989
- Solo Piano, a 2004 album by Gonzales
- Miscellaneous solo piano compositions (Rachmaninoff)

== See also ==
- Piano solo, a musical composition written solely for piano
- Piano Solo, code name for an envisaged plot for an Italian coup in 1964
- Piano Solo (disambiguation)
