= Dance along the Old Silk Road =

Pipa song composed by Yang Jing in 1993

Dance along the Old Silk Road (Chinese: 龜茲舞曲, Pinyin: Qiǖ Cī Wǔ Qǚ) is a pipa song, composed by Yang Jing in 1993. It was chosen as a compulsory education for the 2004 China National Pipa Competition. The composition has won the first Prr China Chamber music composition competition in 1994. The composer herself it (with the outstanding performance award in the same year). This title has been used for music festivals.
