= Singing Drums =

Studio album by the Pierre Favre Ensemble
- Released: 1 November 1984
- Recorded: May 27–28, 1984
- Studio: Mohren, Willisau
- Genre: Jazz; avant-garde jazz; free jazz
- Length: 40:59
- Label: ECM 1274
- Producer: Manfred Eicher

Pierre Favre chronology
Singing Drums (1984)	Fleuve (2006)

Singing Drums is an album by the Pierre Favre Ensemble recorded over two days in May 1984 and released on ECM November that same year. The all-percussion quartet features Paul Motian, Fredy Studer, and Nana Vasconcelos.

== Reception ==
The AllMusic review by Michael G. Nastos awarded the album 4½ stars stating "For special tastes".

Modern Drummer called the pieces on the album "a bunch of hypnotic, surprisingly melodic pieces for four rhythmatists."

Professional ratings
Review scores
Source	Rating
Allmusic	4.5/5 stars
The Penguin Guide to Jazz Recordings	3/4 stars

== Track listing ==
All compositions by Pierre Favre except as indicated

1. "Rain Forest" - 5:14
2. "Carneval of the Four" - 6:11
3. "Metal Birds" - 5:22
4. "Edge of the Wing" - 4:17
5. "Prism" - 8:14
6. "Frog Songs" - 6:07
7. "Beyond the Blue" - 5:48

== Personnel ==
=== Pierre Favre Ensemble ===
- Pierre Favre – drums, gongs, crotales, cymbals
- Paul Motian – drums, gongs, crotales, calebasses, rodbrushes
- Fredy Studer – drums, gongs, cymbals
- Nana Vasconcelos – berimbau, voice, tympani, conga, water pot, shakers, bells
