= Piano Solo Vol. 2 =

Live album by Irène Schweizer
- Released: 1992
- Recorded: May 25, 1990
- Venue: Alte Kirche Boswil, Switzerland
- Genre: Free Jazz
- Label: Intakt Records; CD 021
- Producer: Intakt Records

Piano Solo Vol. 2 is a live solo piano album by Irène Schweizer. It was recorded at Alte Kirche Boswil in Switzerland in May 1990, and was released in 1992 by Intakt Records.

== Reception ==
Professional ratings
Review scores
Source	Rating
AllMusic	4/5 stars
The Penguin Guide to Jazz	3.5/4 stars
Tom Hull – on the Web	B+
The Virgin Encyclopedia of Jazz	4/5 stars

In a review for AllMusic, Eugene Chadbourne wrote: "Swiss pianist Irène Schweizer's solo concert of May 25, 1990, was close to breathtaking; she deserves every last clap of applause that we hear... it is in the most abstract pieces, 'Serious Hanging Out' and the inside-the-piano 'Chuschtenploz,' that she comes up with the set's finest music. She also has a smooth way with standards and coasts to the finish line with a Monk tune."

The authors of the Penguin Guide to Jazz Recordings awarded the album 3½ stars, and stated: "Brief and apparently inconsequential structures are delivered without elaboration and there is a meditative stillness to much of the music... 'Sisterhood of Spit' is a name that refers to an all-female collective of the '70s. It's dedicated to the late Chris McGregor... and also to saxophonist Dudu Pukwana. It both reflects and ironizes the spirit they evoked... [The record is] faithfully and accurately registered, picking up Schweizer's softest figures and sustains, and handling the loudest and most impactful moments without distortion."

Author Todd S. Jenkins noted that the album provides "an unobstructed view of Schweizer's essential techniques," and commented: "a different aspect of the artist's personal vocabulary is demonstrated on each track, a virtual roadmap of her musical mind."

== Track listing ==
"All Alone" composed by Irving Berlin. "Ask Me Now" by Thelonious Monk. Remaining compositions by Irène Schweizer.

1. "Sisterhood of Spit (Dedicated to Chris and Dudu)" – 3:19
2. "Fox-Trottel" – 3:14
3. "All Alone" – 3:01
4. "Serious Hanging-Out" – 9:31
5. "Shredded Shuffle" – 5:19
6. "Creeping Waltz" – 6:02
7. "Chüschtenplötz" – 8:02
8. "...Ausserdem U. Andererseits U. Aussersihl" – 8:39
9. "Ask Me Now" – 3:44

== Personnel ==
- Irène Schweizer – piano
