= Christian Broecking =

German sociologist and musicologist (1957–2021)

Christian Broecking (5 June 1957 – 2 February 2021) was a German sociologist and musicologist, music critic, columnist, writer, editor, radio producer and author. He held teaching positions at several universities in Germany and Switzerland and published several books on African-American music and its social and political contexts, as well as on his interviews with jazz musicians such as Max Roach, Herbie Hancock, Ornette Coleman, Sonny Rolins, Gregory Porter or the Swiss composer and pianist Irène Schweitzer.

== Biography ==
Broecking was born in Flensburg, northern Germany. He studied sociology and musicology at the Free University of Berlin, Germany, and obtained his Ph.D. (Dr. phil.) from the Technische Universität Berlin. The title of his 2011 PhD thesis in German can be translated as "The Marsalis-Nexus: Studies in the Societal Relevance of Afro-American Jazz, 1992-2007". Based on a long-term study and personal interviews, Broecking asked African-American jazz musicians about their experiences and personal assessment of racism and discrimination.

Broecking was a founding program director for Berlin Jazz Radio from 1994 to 1998 and Klassik Radio Frankfurt from 2000 to 2003. He also was a member of the jury for the Preis der deutschen Schallplattenkritik (German award for musical recordings) and for the 11th Annual Jazz Critics Poll 2017

His books Der Marsalis Faktor (transl.: The Marsalis-factor), Respect!,"Black Codes, Jeder Ton eine Rettungsstation (transl.: We are here to save lives) were highly acclaimed. His articles on music and cultural studies appeared in scholarly journals and editions on jazz music. He also wrote radio features on jazz and African-American culture for German public radio since 1995 and taught musicology and American studies at universities in Heidelberg, Frankfurt, Berlin and Oldenburg.

In 2004, he founded his own publishing company, Broecking Verlag, where several of his books were published. In 2012, he curated an exhibition with his photographs of jazz personalities such as Stanley Crouch, Dave Brubeck and Ornette Coleman, titled "Visualizing Respect", at Gallery Zellermayer, Berlin, and published a book with the same title. Broecking's 2018 book Respect! The history of Fire Music was prefaced by American scholar and composer George E. Lewis.

Broecking also wrote for German newspapers and magazines, such as Süddeutsche Zeitung, Berliner Zeitung, taz and Jazz thing magazine and served as staff writer for the online music section of Die Zeit. He was a Senior Research Associate at the Lucerne University of Applied Sciences and taught music history at the Winterthurer Institut für aktuelle Musik in Switzerland. In September 2007, he participated in the international conference “Jazz in the Global Imagination: Music, Journalism and Culture”, convened by the Center for Jazz Studies at Columbia University and the Jazz Journalists Association. At the Heidelberg Center for American Studies, Broecking curated and convened the international conferences "Lost in Diversity. A transatlantic dialogue on the societal relevance of jazz" (2012) and "Vision, Perception, Friction: How Jazz Became Art and Attack(ed) – A Transatlantic Dialogue" (2013). At the Darmstädter Jazzforum 2013, he spoke on „Not Black enough? Debating jazz in the Post-Black time space".

From 2013 to 2016, Broecking researched and wrote his last work, a 471-page biography of the Swiss pianist and activist Irène Schweizer in the context of jazz in Europe, published first in German and then in English as This uncontainable feeling of freedom: Irene Schweizer, European jazz, and the politics of improvisation.

Broecking died on 2 February 2021 in Berlin after a long illness.

== Works ==
- Christian Broecking, Der Marsalis-Faktor. Oreos, Waakirchen-Schaftlach 1995, ISBN 3-923657-48-X
- Christian Broecking, Respekt!. Verbrecher, Berlin 2004, ISBN 3-935843-38-0
- Christian Broecking, Black Codes. Verbrecher, Berlin 2005, ISBN 3-935843-60-7
- Christian Broecking, Jeder Ton eine Rettungsstation. Verbrecher, Berlin 2007, ISBN 978-3-935843-85-0
- Christian Broecking, Ornette Coleman - Klang der Freiheit. Creative People Books / Broecking Verlag Berlin 2010, ISBN 978-3-938763-13-1
- Christian Broecking, Herbie Hancock - Interviews. Creative People Books / Broecking Verlag Berlin 2010, ISBN 978-3-938763-12-4
- Christian Broecking, Sonny Rollins - Improvisation und Protest. Creative People Books / Broecking Verlag Berlin 2010, ISBN 978-3-938763-29-2
- Christian Broecking, Respekt! Die Geschichte der Fire Music. Verbrecher, Berlin 2011, ISBN 978-3-940426-67-3.
- Christian Broecking, Respekt! Die Geschichte der Fire Music. Creative People Books, Berlin 2018, ISBN 978-3-938763-47-6.
- Christian Broecking, Visualizing Respect. Jazzfotografien / Jazz Photography. Creative People Books, Berlin 2012, ISBN 978-3-938763-33-9.
- Christian Broecking, Der Marsalis-Komplex. Studien zur gesellschaftlichen Relevanz des afroamerikanischen Jazz. Creative People Books, Berlin 2014, ISBN 978-3-938763-36-0.
- Christian Broecking, Gregory Porter. Jazz, Gospel & Soul. Creative People Books, Berlin 2015, ISBN 978-3-938763-42-1.
- Christian Broecking, Dieses unbändige Gefühl der Freiheit. Irène Schweizer - Jazz, Avantgarde, Politik. Creative People Books, Berlin 2016, ISBN 978-3-938763-44-5. English edition: This uncontainable feeling of freedom: Irene Schweizer, European jazz, and the politics of improvisation, translated from the German by Jeb Bishop, Broecking Verlag, Berlin, 2021, ISBN 978-3-938763-52-0.
