= Nipples (Peter Brötzmann album) =

Studio album by Peter Brötzmann
- Released: 1969
- Recorded: April 1969
- Genre: Free jazz
- Length: 73:38
- Label: Calig
- Producer: Manfred Eicher

Peter Brötzmann chronology
Machine Gun (1968)	Nipples (1969)

Nipples is a 1969 album by free jazz saxophonist Peter Brötzmann, originally released on the Calig record label. The title track is performed by a sextet comprising Brötzmann (tenor saxophone), Evan Parker (also on tenor saxophone), Derek Bailey (guitar), Fred Van Hove (piano), Han Bennink (drums), and Buschi Niebergall (bass). The other track featured, "Tell a Green Man", is performed by a quartet made up of Brötzmann, Van Hove, Niebergall, and Bennink.

The album was reissued on CD by Atavistic Records as part of their Unheard Music Series in 2000. The label also released a second CD in 2003 titled More Nipples, featuring three further recordings from the same sessions: an alternate take of "Nipples", performed by the sextet, and two further recordings by the quartet.

In September 2021, television host Jimmy Fallon included the album in his show's "Do Not Play" segment, mocking the title, and stating that the music "sounds like a Guitar Center on a busy Saturday." In an email to Rolling Stone, Brötzmann responded: "We both know that the world is full of ignorants and stupidos, one more or less, who cares."

== Reception ==
Professional ratings
Review scores
Source	Rating
AllMusic	3/5 stars
The Penguin Guide to Jazz Recordings	3.5/4 stars
Pitchfork	8.4/10 stars

In a review for AllMusic, Lang Thompson wrote: "The music's dense, everything-at-once nature sometimes makes it seem like a hot-headed competition, but in the end it's the musician's construction of intricately detailed patterns that really matter... Nipples is certainly not the best introduction to these musicians but nevertheless offers a fascinating look at their early careers."

The authors of the Penguin Guide to Jazz Recordings awarded the album 3½ stars, and stated: "this medium-size ensemble is actually rather rare in the Brötzmann discography and the results are fascinating."

A reviewer for Pitchfork commented: "Today's musical landscape is marred by the footprints of lightweights and the layabouts who write about them... Nipples may be by turns aggravating, inscrutable, cacophonous and soulless, but sitting next to today's crop on the New Release rack of your local Sam Goody, it seems the work of giants. Crazy, strung-out, Teutonic giants, but giants nonetheless."

Dave Heaton, writing for PopMatters, stated: "Listen to the whole... and you don't get the mess that you might expect with six musicians each blazing his own path. Instead you get a new kind of cohesiveness. Everything fits together in an interesting way, without being planned to fit together, at least not in the conventional way that musical numbers are planned out.... this recording is jaw-dropping, awe-inspiring and beautiful."

Writer Ben Watson remarked: "This is music played at such a pitch of impatience and self-criticism that every note bursts with expression, a bustle of question-marks, a hive of conflicting vectors. If it's all too much, it's because you're frightened to be alive."

== Track listing ==
Nipples

1. "Nipples" – 17:54
2. "Tell a Green Man" – 15:32

More Nipples14;45

1. "More Nipples" – 17:25
2. "Fiddle-Faddle" – 13:22
3. "Fat Man Walks (To Robert Wolfgang Schnell)" – 9:25

== Personnel ==
- Peter Brötzmann – tenor saxophone
- Evan Parker – tenor saxophone
- Derek Bailey – guitar
- Fred Van Hove – piano
- Han Bennink – drums
- Buschi Niebergall – bass

"Tell A Green Man" has the personnel listed above but without Derek Bailey and Evan Parker.
