= First Choice: Piano Solo KKL Luzern =

Live album by Irène Schweizer
- Released: 2006
- Recorded: October 8, 2005
- Venue: Kultur- und Kongresszentrum Luzern, Lucerne, Switzerland
- Genre: Free jazz
- Length: 55:07
- Label: Intakt Records; CD 108
- Producer: Intakt Records

Irène Schweizer chronology
Where's Africa (2005)	First Choice: Piano Solo KKL Luzern (2006)	Willisau & Taktlos (2007)

First Choice: Piano Solo KKL Luzern is a live solo piano album by Irène Schweizer. It was recorded at the Kultur- und Kongresszentrum Luzern in Lucerne, Switzerland on October 8, 2005, and was released in 2006 by Intakt Records.

== Reception ==
Professional ratings
Review scores
Source	Rating
All About Jazz	4.5/5 stars
The Penguin Guide to Jazz	4/4 stars
Tom Hull – on the Web	B+

In a review for All About Jazz, Nic Jones wrote: "A real mark of this disc is the degree of difference between the surface of the music and what lies beneath it. With that in mind, it can almost serve as background in the sense of being complementary to some activity other than listening itself—but deeper listening reveals the work of a fierce musical intelligence, however, and is by far the preferable alternative."

The authors of The Penguin Guide to Jazz Recordings awarded the album a full 4 stars, noting that Schweizer's solo recitals have "deepen[ed] in resonance and technical surety." They stated: "Schweizer has learned how to make absence and silence work; they're used sparingly but to tremendous effect... Great sound."

== Track listing ==
All compositions by Irène Schweizer except "Oska T." by Thelonious Monk.

1. "First Choice" – 19:18
2. "Into the Hall of Fame" – 9:49
3. "The Ballad of the Sad Café" – 3:57
4. "Scratching at the KKL" – 5:51
5. "The Loneliness of the Long Distance Piano Player" – 4:49
6. "Oska T." – 3:12
7. "Jungle Beats II" – 3:22

== Personnel ==
- Irène Schweizer – piano
