= Pica Pica =

Live album by Peter Brötzmann, Albert Mangelsdorff, and Günter Sommer
- Released: 1984
- Recorded: September 18, 1982
- Venues: Jazzfest Unna, Stadthalle, Unna, Germany
- Genre: Free jazz
- Length: 41:58
- Labels: FMP; 1050
- Producers: Jost Gebers, Peter Brötzmann

Peter Brötzmann chronology
| Alarm (1983) | Pica Pica (1984) | Berlin Djungle (1987) |

Pica Pica is a live album by saxophonist Peter Brötzmann, trombonist Albert Mangelsdorff, and drummer Günter Sommer. It was recorded on September 18, 1982, at the Stadthalle in Unna, Germany during Jazzfest Unna, and was released in 1984 by FMP/Free Music Production. In 2006, the album was reissued on CD by Atavistic Records as part of their Unheard Music Series.

== Reception ==
Professional ratings
Review scores
| Source | Rating |
|---|---|
| AllMusic | 3/5 stars |
| The Penguin Guide to Jazz | 4/4 stars |
| Tom Hull – on the Web | B+ |
| All About Jazz | 3.5/5 stars |
| Slant Magazine | 3/5 stars |

In a review for AllMusic, Thom Jurek wrote: "There is an interesting contrast of styles here, given the formalist tradition Mangelsdorff came from and the staunch vanguardism of Brötzmann and Sommer. Of course, this is a blowing session that took place at a German Jazzfest and those contrasts work here to the betterment of the music... For those who need new infusions of this sort of thing, it's certainly for you."

The authors of The Penguin Guide to Jazz Recordings stated that the musicians' "interplay on 'Instant Tears' is breathtaking, eminence speaking to eminence."

Writing for All About Jazz, James Taylor commented: "What makes Pica Pica so amazing is not that Brötzmann backs off or confines himself to give Mangelsdorff space. The trombonist offers respite to the fits of aggression from the saxophonist, and Brötzmann can't help but adapt to the repetitive accompaniment of Mangelsdorff, which makes Pica Pica far more listenable than much of Brötzmann's catalog." AAJ's Clifford Allen remarked: "Brötzmann always had an ear for drummers, and it's a shame that... he wasn't able to use Sommer more often. Of course, this ear stretches across countries, traditions, political lines and generations, embracing the possibility in the process."

Slant Magazine's R. Emmet Sweeney called the album "an intimate affair that still shakes the rafters," and praised the passages in "Instant Tears" when Brötzmann and Mangelsdorff join forces, noting: "The moments when these two finally harmonize are genuinely elevating—it sounds like a conversation between peers."

Ken Waxman of JazzWord stated that the album "offers proof positive that the hard-driving reedist can easily hold up his side in an all-star trio configuration," but singled out Sommer's contributions for praise, writing that his "tambourine shuddering cymbal raps, intense cross sticking and triplet flams and rattles add heaving tension to the tunes, which take on new dimensions when he releases the beat. As the trombonist and reedist bluster away on two long improvisations and the short title track, Sommer contributes blunt polyrhythms, using sticks, brushes, palms and fists to provide vivid brush strokes of aural color."

== Track listing ==
1. "Instant Tears" – 20:43
2. "Wie Du Mir, So Ich Dir Noch Lange Nicht" – 17:05
3. "Pica, Pica" – 3:59

== Personnel ==
- Peter Brötzmann – alto saxophone, tenor saxophone, baritone saxophone, tárogató
- Albert Mangelsdorff – trombone
- Günter Sommer – drums, horn
