= Piano Solo Vol. 1 =

Live album by Irène Schweizer
- Released: 1992
- Recorded: May 23 and 24, 1990
- Venue: Alte Kirche Boswil, Switzerland
- Genre: Free Jazz
- Label: Intakt Records; CD 020
- Producer: Intakt Records

Piano Solo Vol. 1 is a live solo piano album by Irène Schweizer. It was recorded at Alte Kirche Boswil in Switzerland in May 1990, and was released in 1992 by Intakt Records.

== Reception ==
Professional ratings
Review scores
Source	Rating
AllMusic	3/5 stars
The Penguin Guide to Jazz	4/4 stars
Tom Hull – on the Web	B+
The Virgin Encyclopedia of Jazz	4/5 stars

In a review for AllMusic, Joslyn Layne wrote: "Piano Solo Vol. 1 offers a wide cross-section of the many modes of impressive improviser and pianist Irene Schweizer. It moves almost without pause through various forms and moods... With well-timed moments of suspense and humor, this album is a great listen and a good sampling of what Schweizer does."

The authors of the Penguin Guide to Jazz Recordings awarded the album 4 stars, and stated: "Brief and apparently inconsequential structures are delivered without elaboration and there is a meditative stillness to much of the music. "The Ballad Of The Sad Cafè"... is a masterpiece of unsentimental expression, played with an affecting combination of gentleness and ironclad certainty... [The record is] faithfully and accurately registered, picking up Schweizer's softest figures and sustains, and handling the loudest and most impactful moments without distortion."

Author Todd S. Jenkins noted that the album provides "an unobstructed view of Schweizer's essential techniques," and commented: "a different aspect of the artist's personal vocabulary is demonstrated on each track, a virtual roadmap of her musical mind."

== Track listing ==
All compositions by Irène Schweizer.

1. "Verschoben" – 5:33
2. "Irritations & Variations" – 5:11
3. "The Ballad Of The Sad Cafè" – 4:06
4. "Wo Ist Mein Hund?" – 2:32
5. "Backlash" – 3:33
6. "Stomping At The Church" – 4:47
7. "Melancholy Single Blues" – 4:06
8. "Look-In" – 1:45
9. "Look-Out" – 3:27
10. "Polka, Dots & Stringbeans" – 2:48
11. "Wieso?" – 1:38
12. "Broken Notes" – 3:26
13. "Endlich!" – 3:46
14. "Talking Frog" – 5:02
15. "Blauer Mazurka" – 3:04

== Personnel ==
- Irène Schweizer – piano
