= Just Listen (Joey Baron album) =

Live album by Joey Baron
- Released: July 16, 2013
- Recorded: November 16, 2008
- Venue: Forum Bundeskunsthalle, Bonn, Germany
- Genre: Jazz
- Length: 61:51
- Label: Relative Pitch; RPR1001
- Producer: Joey Baron, Mike Panico

Joey Baron chronology
Venice, Dal Vivo (2010)	Just Listen (2013)	Live! (2017)

Just Listen is a live album by drummer Joey Baron with guitarist Bill Frisell which was recorded in Germany in 2008 and released by Relative Pitch Records in 2013.

== Reception ==
Professional ratings
Review scores
Source	Rating
All About Jazz	4.5/5 stars

On All About Jazz, Glenn Astarita said "Just Listen is a stylistic outing that institutionalizes the respective musicians' boundless synergy and irrefutable camaraderie. You can't learn this stuff in school. From a duet-based perspective, it's a match made in heaven". In JazzTimes Britt Robson wrote "As you’d expect, Frisell comfortably plunges into genres ranging from back-porch country to spazzed-out electronica to free improvisation, although most of the best moments bear the kinetics of jazz-rock fusion. The guitarist can be a reliably stimulating colorist whether leading or responding, but on Just Listen he initiates most of the action. Despite their extensive experience together, the spontaneous compositions are merely interesting, leaving the half-dozen covers to meet the lofty standard inevitably raised by this tandem. Fortunately, they do".

== Track listing ==
1. "Surprise/Benny's Bugle" (Joey Baron, Bill Frisell/Benny Goodman) – 7:33
2. "Trick Memory" (Baron, Frisell) – 5:49
3. "Pick Apart" (Frisell) – 3:02
4. "Night Howl" (Baron) – 5:07
5. "A Change Is Gonna Come" (Sam Cooke) – 8:40
6. "Cherokee" (Ray Noble) – 7:36
7. "Mood" (Ron Carter) – 5:53
8. "My Little Suede Shoes" (Charlie Parker) – 7:46\
9. "Home on the Road/Follow Your Heart" (Baron, Frisell/John McLaughlin) – 10:25

== Personnel ==
- Joey Baron – drums
- Bill Frisell – guitar
