= European Echoes =

Studio album by Manfred Schoof
- Released: 1969
- Recorded: June 1969
- Studio: Bremen, Germany
- Genre: Free jazz
- Length: 30:49
- Label: FMP; 0010
- Producer: Jost Gebers

Manfred Schoof chronology
Manfred Schoof Sextett (1967)	European Echoes (1969)	New Jazz Trio: Page One (1970)

Second edition cover

European Echoes is an album by trumpeter Manfred Schoof on which he is joined by members of the Manfred Schoof Orchestra, a large ensemble of free jazz musicians. Consisting of a single half-hour track, it was recorded during June 1969 in Bremen, Germany, and was issued on vinyl later that year by FMP as the label's inaugural release. It appeared in three editions, each of which had its own cover design. In 2002, the album was reissued on CD by Atavistic Records as part of their Unheard Music Series, and in 2013, it was reissued on vinyl by Cien Fuegos, an imprint of Trost Records.

Writer Bill Shoemaker compared the album to John Coltrane's Ascension, but noted that, although both albums alternated solos and short tutti passages, European Echoes included extended sections for smaller units of the ensemble, including a passage for three pianos, a drum set duet, and a double bass trio. Shoemaker stated that "this gave the piece a distinctive shape and signaled a new equality among instruments in free music, which was to date a horn-dominated music."

== Reception ==
Professional ratings
Review scores
Source	Rating
All About Jazz	3.5/5 stars
All About Jazz	3/5 stars
AllMusic	3/5 stars
The Penguin Guide to Jazz	4/4 stars
The Vinyl District	A
The Virgin Encyclopedia of Jazz	3/5 stars

In a review for AllMusic, Stewart Mason wrote: "European Echoes is primarily of interest to free jazz historians and fanciers of the extreme. The historians will be dazzled by the all-star lineup of this 16-member band... It sounds like it should be a free jazzer's paradise, and there's no denying that the intensity level throughout is amazingly high. The problem is that this enormous band, playing at top volume, is simply too much for the less-than-top-line recording gear that was capturing all this."

The authors of The Penguin Guide to Jazz Recordings called the album "a challenging and sometimes uncomfortable listen," as well as "a remarkable performance." They stated: "It's a record that struggles manfully against the recording values of the time... Schoof is a major figure in German music... but it's a pity that his contribution to improvised music isn't better remembered."

Jay Collins of All About Jazz commented: "What is striking is the density of the instrumentation... the elasticity of the written/improvised passages, and the remarkable solo talents of these improvisers... The sound quality is certainly muddy at times, but perhaps one could view that as part of the thick stew that makes up this work... This is mandatory listening for folks interested in a large sound." AAJ's Derek Taylor described the ensemble as "a veritable dream orchestra populated by youthful incarnations of many of free improvisation's leading lights," and remarked: "Some listeners are likely to feel slighted by the album's brevity, but it bears considering that this single piece is meant to stand-alone. Outtakes and alternates would have been welcome, but the performance works on its own terms just as well without them."

The Vinyl District's Joseph Neff wrote: "this LP is very much a reaction to, a conversational extension of, the previous American advances in avant-garde jazz... the music has lost none of its intensity and its importance as a declaration of avant-garde principles remains secure."

Writing for JazzWord, Ken Waxman called the album a "wild ride," and noted: "With the examples of controlled chaos that other large ensembles like New York's The Jazz Composer's Orchestra, GUO and Brötzmann's Machine Gun band already created, this disc is most valuable providing aural views of important EuroImprovisers early in their career."

== Track listing ==
Composed by Manfred Schoof.

Side A

1. "European Echoes Part 1" – 15:33

Side B

1. "European Echoes Part 2" – 15:32

== Personnel ==
- Manfred Schoof – trumpet
- Peter Brötzmann – tenor saxophone
- Gerd Dudek – tenor
- Evan Parker – soprano saxophone, tenor saxophone
- Enrico Rava – trumpet
- Hugh Steinmetz – trumpet
- Paul Rutherford – trombone
- Derek Bailey – guitar
- Irène Schweizer – piano
- Fred Van Hove – piano
- Alexander von Schlippenbach – piano
- Arjen Gorter – double bass
- Peter Kowald – double bass
- Buschi Niebergall – double bass
- Han Bennink – drums
- Pierre Favre – drums
