= Buschi Niebergall =

German musician (1938–1990)

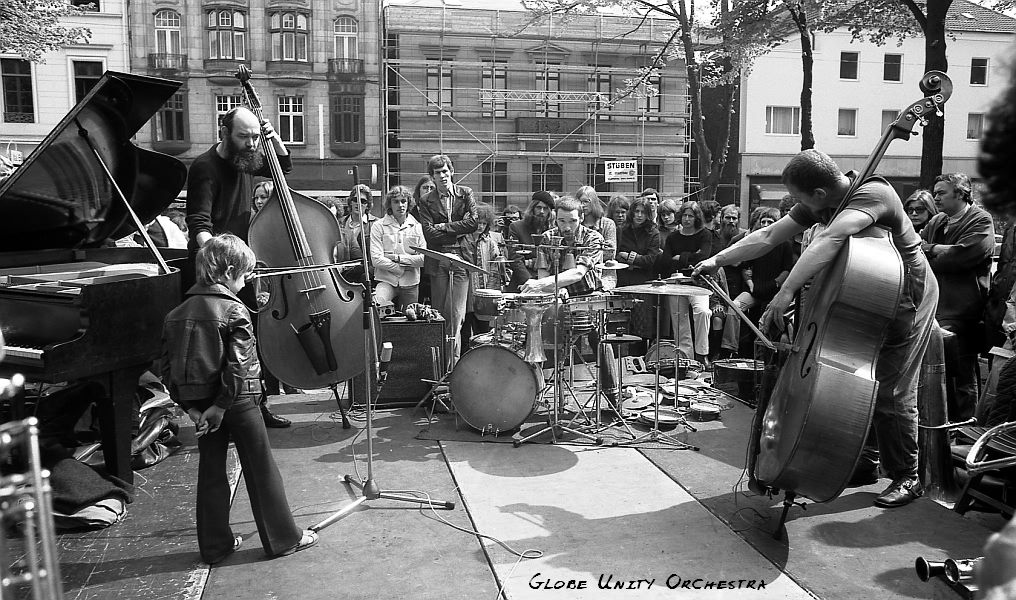

Buschi Niebergall (July 18, 1938 – January 9, 1990) was a German free jazz musician. His given name was Hans-Helmut, and late in life, his friends called him Johannes.

Born in the city of Marburg into a family of academics (his father was a professor of theology and temporarily rector of the University of Marburg), Niebergall enrolled in medical school. Playing acoustic guitar, he got in contact with other musicians and quit his studies. As double-bass player Niebergall became co-founder of several of the first and most influential Free Jazz formations of Germany during the mid-1960s. Gunter Hampel's quintet Heartplants and Voices by the Manfred Schoof quintet are two excellent examples of this independent European free jazz development.

A founding member of the Globe Unity Orchestra since 1966, Niebergall collaborated with many musicians playing freely improvised music, including Peter Brötzmann, Don Cherry, Alfred Harth, Evan Parker, Alexander von Schlippenbach, Irène Schweizer, and John Tchicai. During the early 1970s he played in Albert Mangelsdorff's various quartets and quintets. After 1980 he chose a life in isolation in Frankfurt a.M., with the exception of occasional stints within a "Jazz und Lyrik" project.

== Discography ==
=== As co-leader ===
- Listen/Hear (Ogun, 1975 [1977]) with NICRA
- Open (FMP, 1977 [1979]) with Gerd Dudek and Edward Vesala
- Celeste (Trion, 1978 [1979]) with Michel Pilz and Uwe Schmitt

=== As sideman ===
With Peter Brötzmann

- Machine Gun (Brö, 1968)
- Fuck de Boere (Atavistic, 1968 [2001])
- Nipples (Calig, 1969)
- More Nipples (Atavistic, 1969 [2003])
- Born Free: The 12th German Jazz Festival (Scout, 1970) one track

With Marion Brown

- Gesprächsfetzen (Calig, 1968)

With the Globe Unity Orchestra

- Globe Unity 67 & 70 (Atavistic, 1967 and 1970 [2001])
- Live in Wuppertal (FMP, 1973)
- For Example — Workshop Freie Musik 1969-1978 (FMP, 1973 [1978]) one track
- Globe Unity '74: Der Alte Mann Bricht...sein Schweigen (FMP, 1974)
- Bavarian Calypso/Goodbye (FMP, 1975)
- Pearls (FMP, 1975)
- Jahrmarkt/Local Fair (Po Torch, 1975 and 1976 [1977])
- Improvisations (Japo, 1977 [1978])
- Compositions (Japo, 1979 [1980])

With Alexander von Schlippenbach

- Globe Unity (SABA, 1966 [1967])
- The Living Music (Quasar, 1969)

With Manfred Schoof

- Voices (CBS, 1966)
- Ozvěny Jazzového Festivalu Praha 1966 - Lucerna (Supraphon, 1966 [1967]) one track
- The Early Quintet (FMP, 1966 and 1967 [1978])
- Manfred Schoof Sextet (Wergo, 1967)
- Jazz Jamboree 67 Vol. 1 (Muxa, 1967 [2021])
- European Echoes (FMP, 1969)

With Michael Sell

- Innovationen für 10 Instrumente (MISP, 1980)
- Jugoslawische Quartette (MISP, 1981 [1982])

With others

- Heartplants - Gunter Hampel (SABA, 1965)
- The Numbered Improvisations - Bernd Alois Zimmermann (Tratto, 1966 [1969])
- International Holy Hill Jazz Meeting 1969 - various artists (Meno, 1969)
- Actions - Don Cherry and Krzysztof Penderecki (Philips, 1971)
- Birds of Underground - Albert Mangelsdorff (MPS, 1972 [1973])
- Willi the Pig - John Tchicai and Irène Schweizer (Willisau Live, 1975 [1976])
- Atmospheric Conditions Permitting - Jazzensemble Des Hessischen Rundfunks (ECM, 1978 [1995])
- Ballade An Der Ruhr - Jan Wallgren/Bengt Ernryd Group (Dragon, 1979 [1980])
- Jamabiko - Michel Pilz Quartett (MP, 1983 [1984])
