= Open (Gerd Dudek, Buschi Niebergall, and Edward Vesala album) =

Live album by Gerd Dudek, Buschi Niebergall, and Edward Vesala
- Released: 1979; 2004
- Recorded: April 7–9, 1977
- Venue: Workshop Freie Music, Academy of Arts, Berlin
- Genre: Free jazz
- Length: 49:30
- Label: FMP; 0570; Atavistic; UMS/ALP247CD
- Producer: Jost Gebers

Open is a live album by saxophonist Gerd Dudek, double bassist Buschi Niebergall, and drummer Edward Vesala. It was recorded during April 7–9, 1977, at the Workshop Freie Music held at the Academy of Arts in Berlin, and was initially released on vinyl by the FMP label in 1979. In 2004, Atavistic Records reissued the album on CD as part of their Unheard Music Series.

== Reception ==
Professional ratings
Review scores
Source	Rating
All About Jazz	5/5 stars
AllMusic	2/5 stars
The Penguin Guide to Jazz Recordings	3/4 stars
Tom Hull – on the Web	A−
The Virgin Encyclopedia of Jazz	3/5 stars

In a 5-star review for All About Jazz, Jochem van Dijk stated that the album "contains some of the best improvising and ensemble playing I have heard in a long, long time," and wrote: "The music on Open is a true improviser's almanac. The lack of predictability goes hand in hand with a concentration that never lets off, and the players have each other by the throat all the time, so to speak, leading to an intensity that doesn't quit."

The authors of The Penguin Guide to Jazz Recordings described the album as "a strong trio session which is best described as 'open' rather than 'free'," and commented: "Dudek's multi-instrumentalism is never merely decorative, but though he has very different attacks on his different horns, it is always clear who is playing."

Critic Tom Hull awarded the album a grade of "A−", noting "the sort of fully alert interplay that free jazz aspires to but rarely achieves."

One Final Note's Jay Collins called Open "a strong summit meeting that provides further evidence of Dudek's improvisational strengths and why his name appears on so many important European Free Music releases."

In an article for IAJRC Journal, Stuart Kremsky described the album as a "European classic," and, regarding the Atavistic reissue, wrote: "This is a rarity by an unjustly neglected figure, and it's good to have it available to a new audience for free jazz that might appreciate it."

Ken Waxman of JazzWord stated: "There are many things to like on Open, from Dudek's silvery flute gusts to Niebergall's studied ponticello accompaniment to Vesala's workouts on snares and toms." However, he noted that "there's a certain distance from the kind of rapturous spontaneity that someone like [Peter] Brötzmann has, and a tenacious attachment to their sources that more accomplished stylists lack keeps the trio out of the front ranks."

== Track listing ==
1. "H.S." (Gerd Dudek) – 8:02
2. "Kugel" (Buschi Niebergall) – 5:10
3. "Mira" (Buschi Niebergall) – 10:55
4. "Manchmal" (Gerd Dudek) – 5:43
5. "Open" (Gerd Dudek) – 11:36
6. "Chain" (Buschi Niebergall) – 8:04

== Personnel ==
- Gerd Dudek – tenor saxophone, soprano saxophone, flute, shenai
- Buschi Niebergall – double bass
- Edward Vesala – drums
