= Irène Schweizer =

Swiss pianist (1941–2024)

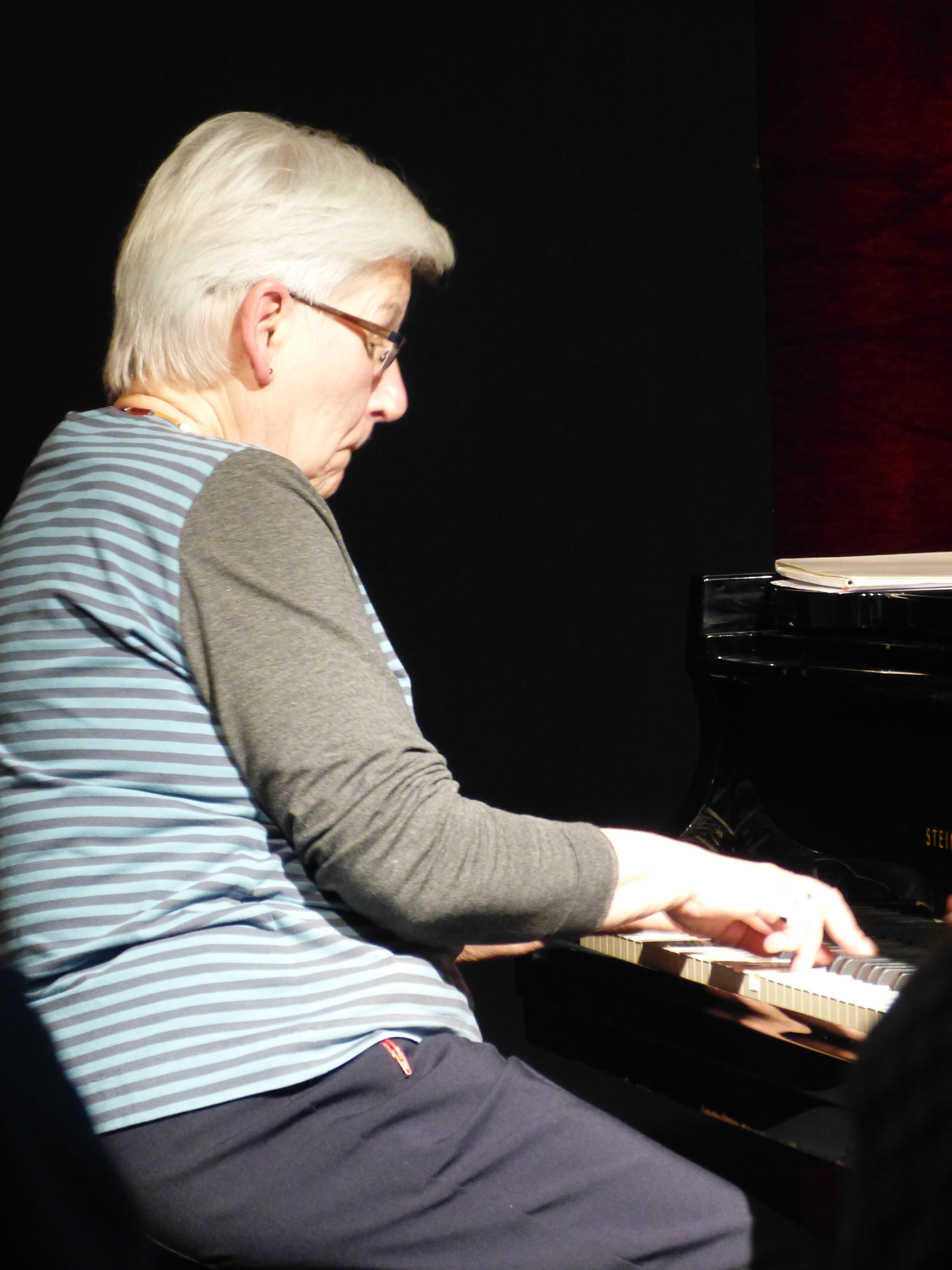
- Schweizer performing in 2014

Background information
- Born: Irène Schweizer; 2 June 1941; Schaffhausen, Switzerland
- Died: 16 July 2024 (aged 83) Zurich, Switzerland
- Genres: Avant-garde jazz; free jazz; free improvisation
- Occupation: Musician
- Instrument: Piano
- Labels: Intakt; FMP
- Formerly of: Feminist Improvising Group

Irène Schweizer (2 June 1941 – 16 July 2024) was a Swiss jazz and free improvising pianist.

== Life and career ==
Schweizer was born in Schaffhausen, Switzerland on 2 June 1941. She performed and recorded numerous solo piano performances as well as performing as part of the Feminist Improvising Group, whose members include Lindsay Cooper, Maggie Nichols, Georgie Born and Sally Potter. She has also performed a series of duets with drummers Pierre Favre, Louis Moholo, Andrew Cyrille, Günter Sommer, Han Bennink, Hamid Drake, as well as in trio and quartet sessions with others, including John Tchicai, Evan Parker and Peter Kowald. With Yusef Lateef, Uli Trepte and Mani Neumeier, she performed at the Montreux Jazz Festival in 1967. One of her most enduring collaborations was with the improvising musician Rüdiger Carl.

In 2016, on the occasion of Schweizer's 75th birthday, Broecking Verlag and the music department of the Lucerne University published (in German) an authorized biography titled This Uncontainable Feeling of Freedom: Irène Schweizer – European Jazz and the Politics of Improvisation, written by Christian Broecking. An English translation was published in 2021.

Schweizer died in Zurich on 16 July 2024, at the age of 83.

== Discography ==
=== Solo ===
- Wilde Señoritas (FMP, 1977)
- Hexensabbat (FMP, 1978)
- Piano Solo Vol. 1 (Intakt, 1992)
- Piano Solo Vol. 2 (Intakt, 1992)
- Many and One Direction (Intakt, 1996)
- Chicago Piano Solo (Intakt, 2001)
- First Choice: Piano Solo KKL Luzern (Intakt, 2006)
- To Whom It May Concern: Piano Solo Tonhalle Zürich (Intakt, 2011)

=== Duo ===
- The Very Centre of Middle Europe (HatHut, 1978), with Rüdiger Carl
- Die V-Mann Suite (FMP, 1981), with Rüdiger Carl
- Irène Schweizer & Louis Moholo (Intakt, 1987)
- Cordial Gratin (FMP, 1987), with Joëlle Léandre
- Irène Schweizer & Günter Sommer (Intakt, 1988), with Günter Sommer
- Irène Schweizer & Andrew Cyrille (Intakt, 1989), with Andrew Cyrille
- Overlapping Hands: Eight Segments (FMP, 1991), with Marilyn Crispell
- Irène Schweizer & Pierre Favre (Intakt, 1992), with Pierre Favre
- Irène Schweizer & Han Bennink (Intakt, 1996), with Han Bennink
- European Masters of Improvisation (Captain Trip, Tokyo Tower Wax Museum, 1997), with Mani Neumeier
- Twin Lines (Intakt, 2002), with Co Streiff
- Ulrichsberg (Intakt, 2004), with Pierre Favre
- Where's Africa (Intakt, 2005), with Omri Ziegele
- Live in Zürich (Intakt, 2013), with Pierre Favre
- Spring (Intakt, 2014), with Jürg Wickihalder
- Welcome Back (Intakt, 2015), with Han Bennink
- Live! (Intakt, 2017), with Joey Baron
- Celebration (Intakt, 2021), with Hamid Drake

=== With Les Diaboliques (Schweizer, Maggie Nicols, Joëlle Léandre) ===
- Les Diaboliques (Intakt, 1994)
- Splitting Image (Intakt, 1997)
- Live at the Rhinefalls (Intakt, 2000)
- Jubilee Concert (DVD) (Intakt, 2009)

=== Trios and larger ensembles ===
- Jazz Meets India (SABA, 1967), with Mani Neumeier, Dewan Motihar, Keshay Sathe, Manfred Schoof, Kusum Thakur, Uli Trepte, and Barney Wilen
- Ramifications (Ogun, 1975), with Rüdiger Carl, Paul Lovens, Radu Malfatti, and Harry Miller
- Messer (FMP, 1976), with Rüdiger Carl and Louis Moholo
- Willi the Pig (Willisau, 1976) with John Tchicai, Buschi Niebergall, and Makaya Ntshoko
- Tuned Boots (FMP, 1978), with Rüdiger Carl and Louis Moholo
- Live at Taktlos (Intakt, 1986), with Lindsay Cooper, Joëlle Léandre, George E. Lewis, Paul Lovens, Maggie Nichols, and Günter Sommer
- The Storming of the Winter Palace (Intakt, 1988), with Joëlle Léandre, George E. Lewis, Maggie Nichols, and Günter Sommer
- Paris Quartet (Intakt, 1989), with Joëlle Léandre, Yves Robert, and Daunik Lazro
- Theoria (Intakt, 1992), with Barry Guy and the London Jazz Composers Orchestra
- Double Trouble Two (Intakt, 1998), with Marilyn Crispell, Barry Guy and the London Jazz Composers Orchestra, and Pierre Favre
- Ensemble Oggimusica Meets Irene Schweizer (Altrisuoni, 2000), with Ensemble Oggimusica
- Willisau & Taktlos (Intakt, 2007), with Fred Anderson and Hamid Drake
- Radio Rondo/Schaffhausen Concert (Intakt, 2009), with Barry Guy and the London Jazz Composers Orchestra
- Berne Concert (Intakt, 2009), with Trio 3 (Andrew Cyrille, Oliver Lake, and Reggie Workman)
- Jump! (Intakt, 2011), with the Jürg Wickihalder European Quartet

With Joe McPhee

- Topology (Hat Hut, 1981)

With Manfred Schoof

- European Echoes (FMP, 1969)
