= Tamia Valmont =

French singer (born 1947)

Tamia Valmont also known as Tamia (born July 29, 1947) is a French composer and singer.

== Biography ==
Tamia Valmont made her stage debut at the Châteauvallon Jazz Festival with Michel Portal, in France, in 1972. She took then part of various musical trends: improvised music, contemporary music, theater, and discovered affinity with extra-European music.

She was commissioned in 1980 to perform solo at the Paris Festival d'Automne. On this occasion, she started using recording her voice successively on a multi-track tape to create what she called a "solo polyphony", a genre she would keep exploring in her career. In 1979 Tom Johnson wrote an article about her in the Village Voice that lead to her first US tour. In 1990 she was invited to perform in Japan by composer Toru Takemitsu at the Tokyo Festival.

She collaborated with artists such as Pierre Favre with whom she recorded 3 CDs. In 2009, the writer Nancy Huston cited Tamia Valmont as her inspiration for the main character of her novel entitled Fault Lines.

She started teaching vocal technique and improvisation in 1973. She is currently teaching to professional singers and actors in Paris.

== Discography ==
Solo Albums

- 1978 : Solo, T Records
- 1981 : Senza Tempo, T Records
- 1999 : Les chants de la Terre, Universal Music

Collaborations with Pierre Favre

- 1983 : Blues for Pedro Arcanjo, T Records-Gemini
- 1988 : De la Nuit...le jour, ECM
- 1992 : Solitudes, ECM
