= Pierre Favre (musician) =

Swiss jazz drummer and percussionist

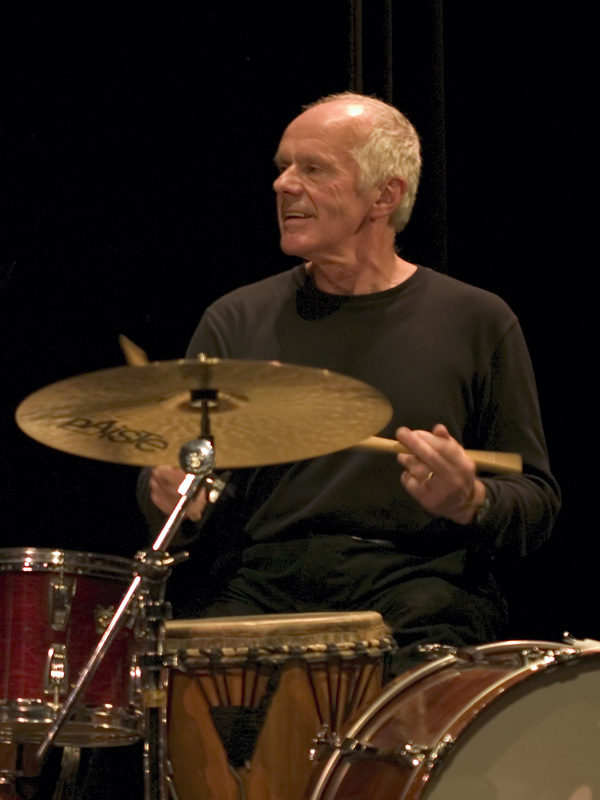
- Favre in 2005

Background information
- Born: 2 June 1937 (age 88); Le Locle, Switzerland
- Genres: Jazz
- Occupation: Musician
- Instruments: Drums, percussion
- Labels: ECM, FMP
- Website: www.pierrefavre.ch

Pierre Favre (born 2 June 1937) is a Swiss jazz drummer and percussionist born in Le Locle, Switzerland.

He recorded the album Singing Drums (ECM, 1984) with Paul Motian and Nana Vasconcelos. He also appears on the John Surman album, Such Winters of Memory (1983). He has recorded with several well-known musicians, including Tamia, Michel Godard, Mal Waldron, Paul Giger, Jiří Stivín, Michel Portal, Samuel Blaser, the ARTE Quartett, and Barre Phillips.

== Career ==
=== 1964–1970: Paiste ===
At the 1964 Paiste drummer meeting in Frankfurt, Pierre met the Paiste brothers who invited him to visit their factory in Nottwil. Since Pierre has always been interested in cymbals, he was most enthusiastic about accepting their invitation. The Paiste brothers were so impressed with his keen interest and attentive attitude, they offered him a position on their staff to take care of the most important task: cymbal development, quality control and to establish an education/drummer service dept. Pierre left Paiste as a full-time employee in 1970 and was replaced by Fredy Studer.

== Select discography ==
=== As leader ===
- Pierre Favre Quartet (Wergo)
- Santana (FMP)
- Pierre Favre European Chamber Ensemble (Intakt)
- Singing Drums (ECM 1984)
- Window Steps (ECM, 1996)
- Fleuve (ECM, 2006)

=== As sideman ===
With Irène Schweizer

- Irène Schweizer & Pierre Favre (Intakt)
- Portrait (Intakt)
- Ulrichsberg (Intakt)

With Samuel Blaser

- Vol à Voile (Intakt, 2010)
- Same Place, Another Time (Blaser Music, 2022)

With Philipp Schaufelberger

- Albatros (Intakt, 2010)

With John Surman

- Such Winters of Memory (ECM, 1982)
- Upon Reflection

With Tamia

- De La Nuit...Le Jour (ECM, 1988)
- Solitudes (ECM, 1991)

With Manfred Schoof

- European Echoes (FMP)

With Michel Godard

- Saxophones (Intakt)
- Castel Del Monte (Enja)
- Deux (Altrisuoni)

With Jiří Stivín

- Výlety (Supraphon)
- Excursions II Twenty Years After (P&J Music)

With Joe McPhee

- Topology (Hat Hut, 1981)

With Michel Portal

- Splendid Yzlment (CBS)

With Barre Phillips

- Music by... (ECM, 1980)
- String Summit: One World In Eight (MPS)

With Dino Saluzzi

- Once Upon a Time - Far Away in the South (ECM, 1985)

With Mal Waldron

- Black Glory (Enja)
- Mal Waldron Plays the Blues (Enja)

With London Jazz Composers Orchestra

- Double Trouble Two featuring Irene Schweizer, Marilyn Crispell and Pierre Favre (Intakt)

With Stefano Battaglia

- When We Were (Splasch)

With Paul Giger

- Alpstein (ECM, 1991)

With Furio Di Castri, Paolo Fresu & Jon Balke

- Mythscapes (Soul Note)

With Denis Levaillant

- Barium Circus (Nato)

With Yang Jing

- Two In One (Intakt)
- Moments

With Andrea Centazzo

- Koans, Volume 1 (Ictus)
- Dialogues (Robi Droli/Newtone)
