= Didier Levallet =

French musician

Didier Levallet (born 19 July 1944, in Arcy-sur-Cure, France) is a French jazz double bassist, composer, arranger and leader.

A self-taught bassist, Levallet made his professional debut in Paris in 1969, working with such artists as Ted Curson, Johnny Griffin, Kenny Clarke, Mal Waldron, Hank Mobley, Archie Shepp, Tony Oxley, Steve Lacy, Harry Beckett and Didier Lockwood.

Levallet was director of the French National Jazz Orchestra from 1997 to 2000. He has also served as an educator at the L’École Nationale de Musique in Angoulême, and regularly hold workshops and music concerts in Cluny, France.
