= Intakt Records =

Swiss record label

- Founded: 1986
- Founder: Patrik Landolt
- Genre: Jazz, avant-garde
- Country of origin: Switzerland
- Location: Zürich
- Official website: www.intaktrec.ch

Intakt Records is an independent record label, based in Zürich, Switzerland.

== History ==
The label was founded in 1986 by Patrik Landolt. In the early 1980s he had co-founded Fabrikjazz, a cultural organization, with Remo Rau and pianist Irène Schweizer. "It was due to high-quality festival recordings made by Swiss Radio that Landolt was eventually inspired to start the label": he said that "Irène Schweizer was internationally known at this time, but her music wasn't well documented, [...] I decided to bring out the first recordings as LPs". The first release sold well – 2,000 copies in one month. In 2003 the 80th album was released and by mid-2013 Intakt had released more than 220.

== Practices ==
The label "sees itself as something more than a traditional record company, working with its artists over the long term to produce carefully curated editions." In the late 1990s, a subscription service was introduced, allowing customers to buy every new release directly from the label at a discount. Although the catalogue has been made available for digital download, as of 2013 Landolt still enjoyed producing CDs as a physical product.
