= List of compositions by Emily Howard =

This is a list of compositions by Emily Howard sorted by genre, date of composition, title and scoring.

Genre	Date	Title	Scoring	Notes
Orchestral	2002	Passacaglia	for String orchestra	
Chamber	2005	Sky and Water	for solo piano	
Orchestral	2005	Dualities	for large ensemble	Commissioned by Ensemble 10/10, the Contemporary Music Group of the Royal Liverpool Philharmonic
Chamber	2006	Cloud Chamber	for clarinet and piano	
Choral	2006	Ite Fortes	for solo violin and choir	Commissioned by Altèri Chamber Choir
Orchestral	2006	Lachrymose	for chamber orchestra	Commissioned by Mozart NOW / Sounds New Festival 2006
Chamber	2007	The Summoning of Mephisto	for chamber ensemble of oboe (dbl. cor anglais), percussion (1 player), viola and double bass	Commissioned by Psappha (ensemble)
Orchestral	2007	Magnetite	for large orchestra	Commissioned by Liverpool European Capital of Culture 2008 for the Royal Liverpool Philharmonic
Chamber	2008	Broken Hierarchies	for 'cello ensemble	Commissioned by Sounds New Festival
Vocal	2008	Wild Clematis in Winter	for mezzo-soprano and piano	Commissioned by NMC Recordings for The NMC Songbook, as part of NMC's 20th Anniversary Celebrations; First performed by Jean Rigby (mezzo) and Huw Watkins (piano) on 4 April 2009 at Kings Place, London, England
Chamber	2009	Masquerade	for basset clarinet and piano	
Chamber	2009	Broken Hierarchies II	for piano trio	
Chamber	2010	Obsidian	for brass band	
Orchestral	2010	Settle	for chamber ensemble and film	
Chamber	2010	Songs from Dickens	for mezzo-soprano, flute, clarinet and percussion	
Orchestral	2010	Solar	for orchestra	
Chamber	2011	Ada sketches	for mezzo-soprano, flute, clarinet and percussion	
Orchestral	2011	Mesmerism	for solo piano and chamber orchestra	
Orchestral	2011	Calculus of the Nervous System	for orchestra	
Chamber	2012	Zugzwänge	for clarinet quintet	
Chamber	2012	Deconstruction V	for amplified chamber ensemble (piano, electric guitar, violin, violoncello, percussion)	
Opera	2012	Zátopek!	mini opera for seven singers, adult and children's choir and chamber ensemble	libretto by Selma Dimitrijevic
Chamber	2013	Carillon	for solo turntables and large ensemble with electronics	
Vocal	2013	Two Songs after Friday Afternoons	for children's choir and piano	
Orchestral	2013	Axon	for orchestra	
Chamber	2014	Afference	for string quartet	
Chamber	2015	Leviathan	for baritone saxophone and percussion	
Chamber	2015	Orbits	for soprano saxophone and crotales	
Chamber	1999	Threnos	for solo tuba	
Chamber	2016	Chaos or Chess	for solo tuba	
Orchestral	2016	Torus	for large orchestra	Winner of the orchestral category of the 2017 British Composer Awards Ivor Novello Awards
Chamber	2017	Four Musical Proofs and a Conjecture	for string quartet	
Orchestral	2017	sphere	for large orchestra	Commission by the Bamberg Symphony
Chamber	2018	Outlier	for solo viola	
Opera	2018	To See the Invisible	for seven singers and nine instrumentalists	chamber opera in eleven scenes
Concertante	2019	But then, what are these numbers?	for mezzo-soprano and chamber ensemble	
Orchestral	2019	The Anvil	for soprano, bass-baritone, chamber choir, youth choir, chorus and orchestra	Commissioned by the BBC Radio 3 and Manchester International Festival; first broadcast on BBC Radio 3 on 16 August 2019, the 200th Anniversary of Peterloo.
Orchestral	2019	Antisphere	for large orchestra	Commissioned by London Symphony Orchestra
Chamber	2020	Lockdown	for solo percussion	
Chamber	2021	R	for solo percussion	
Chamber	2021	Voluntary	for solo cello	
Chamber	2021	Shield	for string quartet	Commissioned by Het Concertgebouw, the Fidelio Trust, the Nicholas Boas Charitable Trust, the RNCM Centre for Practice & Research in Science & Music (PRiSM) and the Piatti Quartet
Concertante	2022	Compass	for solo percussion and strings	
Orchestral	2022	Elliptics	for soprano, countertenor and orchestra	Commissioned by the BBC Philharmonic
Chamber	2023	Deviance	for solo piano and multimedia	Commissioned by Zubin Kanga as part of Cyborg Soloists, with the support of a UKRI Future Leaders Fellowship and Royal Holloway, University of London.
Chamber	2024	Ligament	for piccolo trumpet, percussion (ii), violin, 'cello and double bass	
