= European Jazz Ensemble =

Ensemble of jazz musicians

The European Jazz Ensemble is an ensemble of jazz musicians.

== History ==
The group was formed in 1976. The original members comprised the quintet of Alan Skidmore, Leszek Zadlo, Gerd Dudek, Alfred "Ali" Haurand and Pierre Courbois. After 1982 three of the members quit, and Haurand and Dudek were joined by E. L. Petrowsky, Allan Botschinsky, Manfred Schoof, Rob van den Broeck and Anthony Oxley. At the time of the twelfth anniversary tour the members were joined by Enrico Rava, Philip Catherine, Uschi Brüning and Louis Scalvis. In 1991 with Joachim Kühn also, the ensemble met he Khan Family from India. 1996 saw the twentieth anniversary of the ensembles creation and Charlie Mariano, Joachim Kühn, Enrico Rava, Conny Bauer, Jiri Stivin, Daniel Humair, Tony Lakatos and Rolf Kühn participated by invitation, for the ensembles tour to mark this anniversary. Their thirtieth anniversary tour began in March at Heek, Landesmusikakademie, toured briefly around Germany, had one date in the Netherlands, and concluded in Paris in the same month that it commenced.

== Members ==
The members of the ensemble are:

- Stan Sulzmann (tenor saxophone, soprano saxophone)
- Gerd Dudek (tenor saxophone, soprano saxophone)
- Jiří Stivín (flute, alto saxophone)
- Alan Botschinsky (trumpet, flugelhorn; until 2006)
- Matthias Schriefl (trumpet; since 2006)
- Jarmo Hoogendijk (trumpet)
- Manfred Schoof (trumpet, flugelhorn)
- Alan Skidmore (tenor saxophone)
- Charlie Mariano (alto saxophone)
- Konrad Bauer (trombone)
- Pino Minafra (trumpet, flugelhorn, megaphone, didgeridoo)
- Rob van den Broeck (piano)
- Joachim Kühn (piano)
- Alfred "Ali" Haurand (bass)
- Sébastien Boisseau (bass)
- Daniel Humair (drums)
- Tony Levin (drums)
- Clark Tracey (drums)

Pierre Courbois, drums

== Discography ==
Europea Jazz Quintet, EGO,1978

- Live (Konnex, 1988)
- At the Philharmonic Cologne (M•A, 1989)
- European Jazz Ensemble Meets the Khan Family (M•A, 1992)
- 20th Anniversary Tour (Konnex, 1997)
- 25th Anniversary (Konnex, 2002)
- 30 Years on the Road (Konnex, 2006) DVD
- 30th Anniversary Tour 2006 (Konnex, 2009)
- 35th Anniversary Tour 2011 (Konnex, 2011)
