= Uschi Brüning =

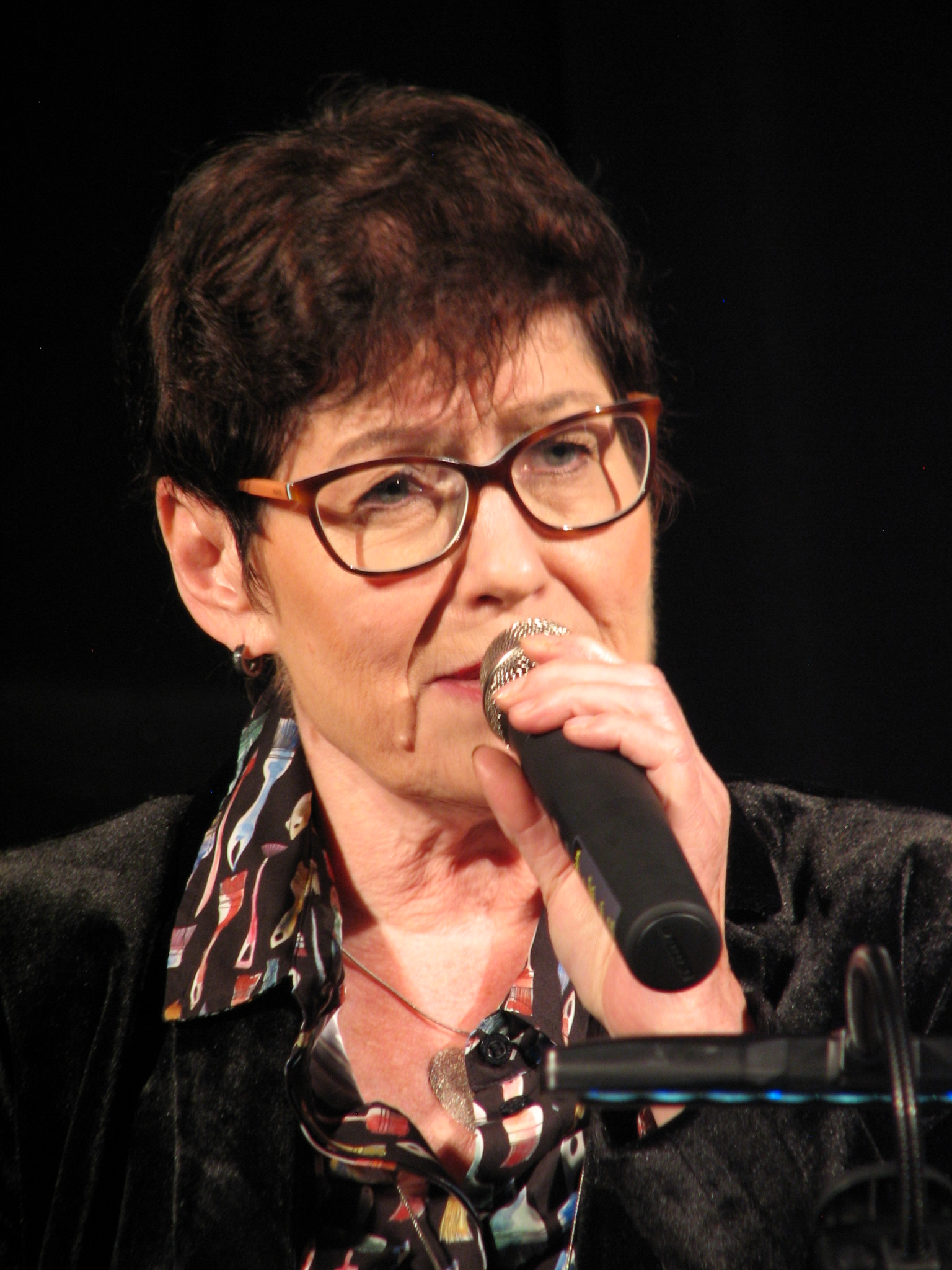
- Brüning in 2018

Background information
- Born: 4 March 1947 (age 79); Leipzig, Saxony, Germany
- Genres: Schlager, jazz, soul
- Occupations: Singer, songwriter
- Education: Musikschule Friedrichshain, Berlin
- Spouse: Ernst-Ludwig Petrowsky

Uschi Brüning (born 1947) is a German jazz and soul singer and songwriter. She made her career in East Germany and was 42 when the Berlin wall was breached. She has transitioned and sustained her career more successfully than other former East German performance artists post-reunification, though her fan base remains concentrated principally in the east.

== Biography ==
Brüning was born in Leipzig, one of the two largest cities in the southern part of the Soviet occupation zone, a couple of years before the zone was rebranded and relaunched as the Soviet sponsored German Democratic Republic (East Germany). She was the younger of her mother's two daughters. A year after her birth her father "ran away". Her mother, who worked as a waitress at the zoo canteen, was left to bring up her daughters as a single mother. There were no longer any grandparents, aunts, or uncles, and the children were often left at home unsupervised; her mother was in the end overwhelmed by the situation.

When she was about five Uschi and her sister were removed by the authorities into a children's home in Engelsdorf, some ten kilometers away, where she turned to singing as a consolation. Here they were incarcerated for the next two years. The orphanage had been founded by Carmelite nuns in 1931, and somehow managed to remain an island of relative sanity, quietly ignoring government precepts on the centrality of Marxism–Leninism to children's education, while outside the country was transformed into a one-party Soviet-style socialist paradise-dictatorship. She was nevertheless shocked by the sudden separation and unhappy; isolated, for the most part, both from her mother and from the "big children", including her sister, who were accommodated in another part of the building. When she was about seven the girls were able to re-join their mother, who was by now better able to deal with the challenges of managing a one-parent family. Later, on the tram to school, she saw that large portraits of a good-looking man with a moustache had appeared on posters alongside the streets. She asked her teacher who he was. It turned out that this was Joseph Stalin, a "good man, and our big brother, who together with his Soviet brothers and sisters had liberated [us] from fascism. He had recently died". Brüning would later recall that on receiving this explanation she had wept bitterly.

As a young woman, it never occurred to her that one might be able to make one's living as a singer. Brüning trained for clerical work in the justice system, and them embarked on a career as a court secretary. There was not at this stage any question of a musical education, but as a child she sang round the house, at school, and around town: word of her exceptional singing voice spread. By the time she started work in the justice system she had already launched herself on the musical progression which would become her career In 1960, aged just 13, she made her first "genuine" stage appearance, singing well-loved Schlager songs in front of the workers at the large Langbein-Pfanhauser electroplating factory in Leipzig-Sellerhausen, not too far from her mother's apartment, which was also on the east side of the city. Further performance invitations followed. By the time she was seventeen, still at school, she was also appearing as a singer-guitarist with "Studio Team", an amateur band with which at the weekends she undertook brief tours of Saxony. She nevertheless passed her Abitur (school final exams). According to more than one source she would have liked to study music and become a school music teacher after leaving school, but it was made clear that this was not an option because, it was explained, she did not play the piano: for a couple of years the music performances took a back seat as she prepared for her career as a clerk in the justice system.

In late 1969, she received a 'phone call from the already well-established trumpet-player and bandleader Klaus Lenz. He had heard that she was "good" and invited her to join his band. (Note: Lenz had received the recommendation concerning Brüning from his friend. the composer-bandleader Horst Krüger.) Starting in 1969 or 1970, she was able to work with the band and at the same time undertake part-time study in Berlin at the Musikschule Friedrichshain, attending one day per week for each of the next two years, and emerging at the end of 1971 with excellent grades and the qualification she needed to work in East Germany as a "professional singer". Lenz himself accompanied her for her graduation concert. The first LP record on which she featured prominently was Klaus Lenz Big Band (1974).

In 1970, Brüning undertook her first professional tour of East Germany, sharing the stages with the Günther Fischer quintet and Manfred Krug. In 1972, she won second prize at the International Schlager Festival in Dresden. Brüning came to jazz relatively late. In 1971 Walter Ulbricht was replaced as national leader by Erich Honecker. Ulbricht had loathed and despised jazz with a toxic passion worthy of National Socialism, describing it as the "Affenkultur des Imperialismus". (Note: The observation is attributed to Ulbricht in various sources, with small variations in the wording, suggesting that the East German dictator shared this assessment on a number of occasions: but the offensiveness of the sentiment to subsequent generations is consistent between the different versions.) There being no printed copies available, East German singers wishing to perform western jazz songs were obliged to transcribe the music from foreign radio stations. (Listening to foreign radio stations was at different stages officially discouraged or illegal.) Most of the time Brüning's early performances were of Schlager and chanson-style music which the authorities preferred. Under Honecker, official denigration of jazz disappeared, and it was at this point that Brüning increasingly switched to entertaining audiences with powerful renderings of western jazz numbers, frequently sharing a stage with her performance partner Manfred Krug.

From 1975, she was working with her own band, "Uschi Brüning & Co" with which, in 1982, she released her third LP record. One member of the band was the saxophonist Helmut Forsthoff. Shortly after, this Brüning was among a number of high-profile figures from the East German arts establishment to sign a letter of protest against the government decision to deprive the singer-songwriter Wolf Biermann of his citizenship. The move had resulted from Biermann's failure to return to East Germany following a concert in West Berlin. Controversially, later in 1976, she withdrew her support from the protest in response to pressure from the security services. She still suffered remorse and embarrassment over her retraction more than forty years later, but explained to an interviewer how she had been persuaded by the nature of the official pressure applied and the implicit threat that family members, including her mother Clärchen, might also suffer state-backed retribution.

In 1977, Brüning appeared at the first "Jazzbühne Berlin" international jazz festival. As a high-profile public entertainer, she enjoyed exceptional travel privileges, and in 1981 she won third prize at the Kärnten International festival in Klagenfurt. From this point she worked increasingly with the saxophonist Ernst-Ludwig „Luten“ Petrowsky. They married in 1982. She participated in the first "Jazztagen" (East German jazz festival), held at Weimar in December 1985. and again, in 1986, at the first International Women's Jazz Festival in Frankfurt, beyond the "internal border" to the west. In 1989, touring with Ali Haurand's European Jazz Ensemble, she performed "Ich mach ein Lied aus Stille" together with the children's author-poet Eva Strittmatter. She had already toured with the European Ensemble in 1987 and would do so again in 1991. The "Ich mach ein Lied aus Stille" was recorded for a CD also featuring Manfred Schmitz and Petrowsky, which was scheduled for release in 1990, but in the event the recording was never issued, presumably due to political developments in Berlin and more broadly. Post-reunification, in 1993 she took part in the Berlin Jazz Festival, appearing in "Programme 4", in concert with the actress Annekathrin Bürger, the chansoniste Barbara Kellerbauer and the opera singer Carola Nossek. In 2008 she delivered a concert with Georgie Fame in the Berliner Philharmonie (concert hall). An edited recording of the concert was (re-)issued in 2015.

Between 2014 and his unexpected death in October 2016, after four decades during which the two of them had gone their separate ways, Brüning performed with Manfred Krug under the title "Manfred Krug reads and s(w)ings". Her album So wie ich ("Just like me"), produced by Andreas Bicking, was nominated in the "National-Singer" category in the 2017 Echo Jazz prize. On 14 September 2018 she teamed up with Stephan König for the thirty-second "Augustiner Concert" at the prestigious Gymnasium St. Augustine (school) to perform together the programme, "Herzenslieder" ("Songs of the heart") which the two of them have developed.

== Discography (selection) ==
=== Albums ===
- 1972: Uschi Brüning und das Günther-Fischer-Quintett
- 1974: Uschi Brüning und Günther Fischer
- 1982: Uschi Brüning
- 1988: Kontraste – Uschi Brüning/Ernst-Ludwig Petrowsky
- 1992: Features of Usel
- 1992: Enfant
- 2000: Breitmaulfrösche
- 2002: Dein Name, das Porträt
- 2005: Swingin’ Ballads
- 2010: Uschi Brüning: Das Portrait (Original Amiga Masters)
- 2013: Ernst-Ludwig Petrowsky / Uschi Brüning / Michael Griener Ein Résumé
- 2014: Auserwählt (with Manfred Krug) (German Jazz Award in Platinum)
- 2015: So wie ich
- 2016: Live (with Engerling, featuring Petrowsky)

=== Singles ===
- 1971: Komm doch zu mir / Lichterglänzendes Rad
- 1972: Dein Name / Bunte Bilder
- 1974: Es war lieb von dir / Die Angst in der Nacht
- 1974: Ich steig’ aufs Dach / Mach deine Augen zu
- 1975: Hochzeitsnacht / Einer wie du

== Autobiography ==
- So wie ich. Berlin 2019, ISBN 978-3-550-05020-6
