= Ahmed Alaidy =

Egyptian writer

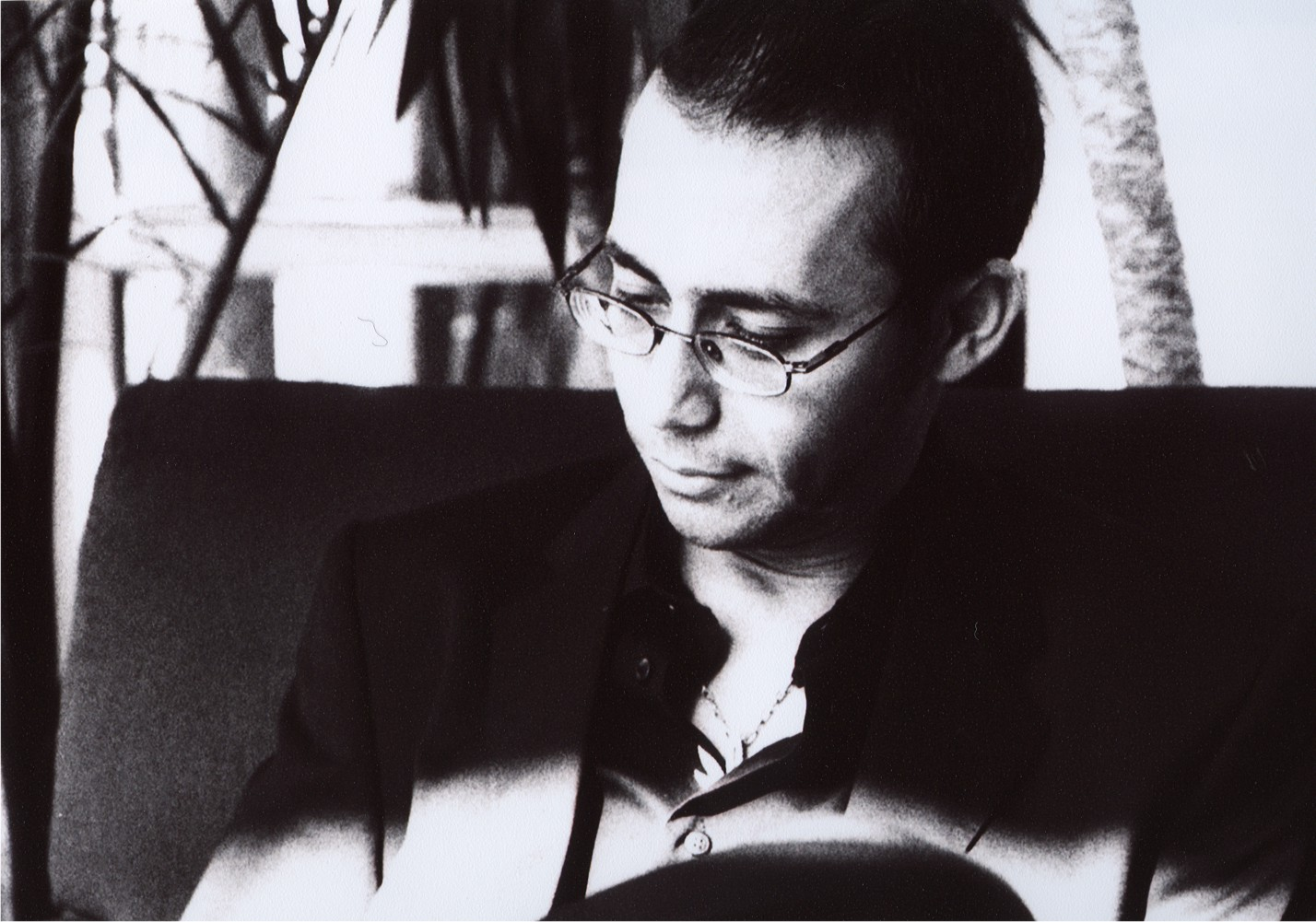
- Born: December 24, 1974 (age 51); Dammam, Saudi Arabia
- Occupations: Novelist, screenwriter, freelance writer, comic writer, poet
- Writing career
- Movements: Minimalism, postmodern

Ahmed Alaidy (Arabic: أحمد العايدي) is an Egyptian novelist, scriptwriter, Director, poet, editor, and Comics Writer born on December 24, 1974. He is the author of the novel Being Abbas El Abd (2006), (An Takoun Abbas El Abd) (2003), أن تكون عباس العبد (in Arabic). He studied marketing at Cairo University, and has worked as a scriptwriter on quiz shows and for the cinema, and as a writer of satirical stories for young people and a book designer. He wrote a political comic strip, and poems for an Egyptian opposition weekly newspaper al-Dostour, الدستور المصرية (in Arabic). Alaidy has participated in international writers’ programs at Iowa University and at Hong Kong Baptist University. He has previously published a long short story.

Classified as a Minimalist writer, and a student of the famous American novelist Chuck Palahniuk which he had received an intensive course in minimalism writing through the Internet.

== Directing ==
Directing NETFLIX's featurette Behind the Story ما وراء القصة 2020 (in Arabic)

Assistant Director for the feature film SAFE EXIT directed by Mohammed Hammad 2026 خروج آمن (in Arabic)

== Writing ==
- worked in as script writer for the Arabic version of the television game show Who Wants to Be a Millionaire?, and as a member of the comedy workshop at MBC channel. 2001-02
- An takoun Abbas El Abd (A Novel) Merit Publishing house (2003/2007/2009), BQFP (2012/2013), Al-Karma Publishers (2014). Translated into : English (2006/2008/2009), Dutch (2008), Italian (2009), Turkish (2009), French (2010), Danish (2011), Russian (2013), and Swedish (2015).
- children comics for Basem magazine. 2006
- political comic strips (Booka wa Sokomonnous) for Al-dostour weekly newspaper.2005-2006
- poems for Al-dostour weekly newspaper. 2006-07-08
- Freelance writer at the German newspaper Süddeutsche Zeitung.
- Co-wrote the Screenplay of the movie El Torbini with Mohamed Hefzy, directed by : Ahmed Medhat, 2007. (Adapted from Rain Man )
- Script doctoring the Blockbuster Movie Keda Reda with his other five co-writers in Script (Movie workshop), Keda Reda directed by : Ahmed Nader Galal Starring: Ahmed Helmy 2007.
- Screenplay of the short movie Love in the time of Gum, directed by Ibrahim Abla 2008.
- Al eshq al sadi;(The Sadistic Love) (collection of poems) Merit Publishing house | 2009, Al-Karma Publishers | 2014.
- Satire comic strips (Adventures of Karee) for Al-shorouk newspaper July 2009.

== Prizes ==
- Being Abbas El Abd was awarded the Sawiris Foundation's 2nd Prize in Egyptian Literature in 2006.
