= Cairo Steps =

Egyptian-German Musical Group

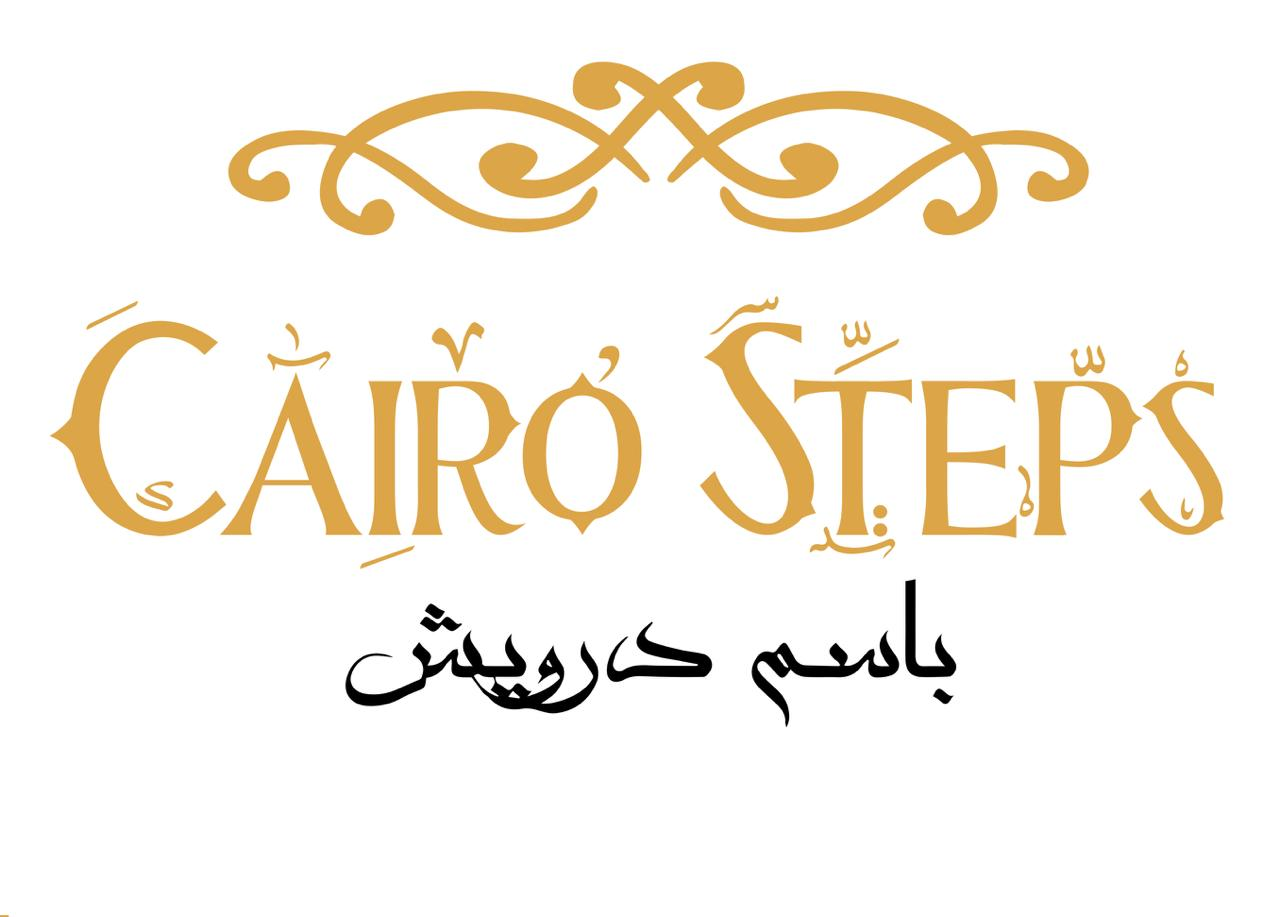
- Cairo Steps Official logo

Background information
- Also known as: Cairo Steps
- Origin: Cairo, Egypt
- Genres: Jazz
- Years active: 2002–present
- Members: Basem Darwisch (Founder); Rami Attallah; Jan Boshra; Rageed William
- Website: cairosteps.com

Cairo Steps is an Egyptian jazz ensemble founded in 2002 by Egyptian–German musician and producer Basem Darwisch. The ensemble was awarded the German Golden Jazz Award in 2018.

== History ==
Cairo Steps was founded in 2002 by Egyptian–German musician and producer Basem Darwisch.

Cairo Steps merges and combines traditional Egyptian and oriental grooves with modern jazz improvisation, classical music and contemporary sounds. The ensemble has played numerous concerts in Egypt, Kuwait, Abu Dhabi, Italy, France and many stages worldwide with musicians and artists from around the world. The group includes members of different nationalities.

== Awards ==
On April 19, 2018, Cairo Steps collected The German Jazz Music award at Berlin ceremony with the ensemble members including Ines Abdul Dayem, Minister of Culture of Egypt, The ensemble received the award for their album Flying Carpet, which they created with German band Quadro Nuevo. The Egyptian minister of culture honored Cairo Steps in the Egyptian Academy in Rome after being awarded the German Jazz Music Award in April 2018.

== Performances and Activities ==
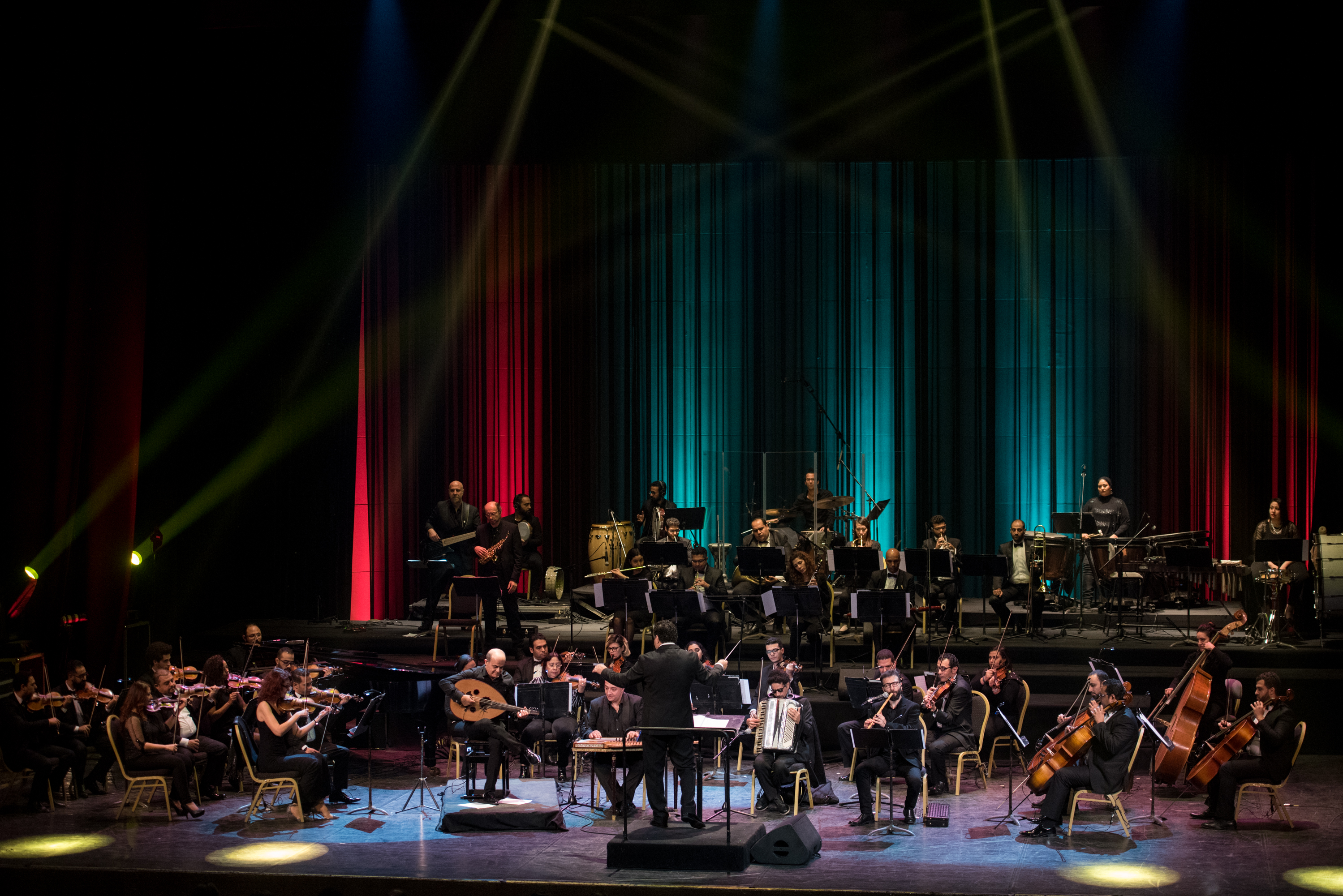
Cairo Steps with Cairo Opera Orchestra – Cairo Opera House 2019

In 2020, Cairo Steps continued to expand their musical presence through a variety of projects and performances. On June 26, they released a video of their track "Shams," originally featured on their 2017 album Flying Carpet. The video showcased the ensemble's adaptability by featuring a virtual performance, highlighting their ability to innovate in music presentation.

The Egyptian Ministry of Culture also broadcast a previously recorded Cairo Steps concert at the Cairo Opera House, as part of an initiative to make cultural performances accessible to a wider audience through online platforms.

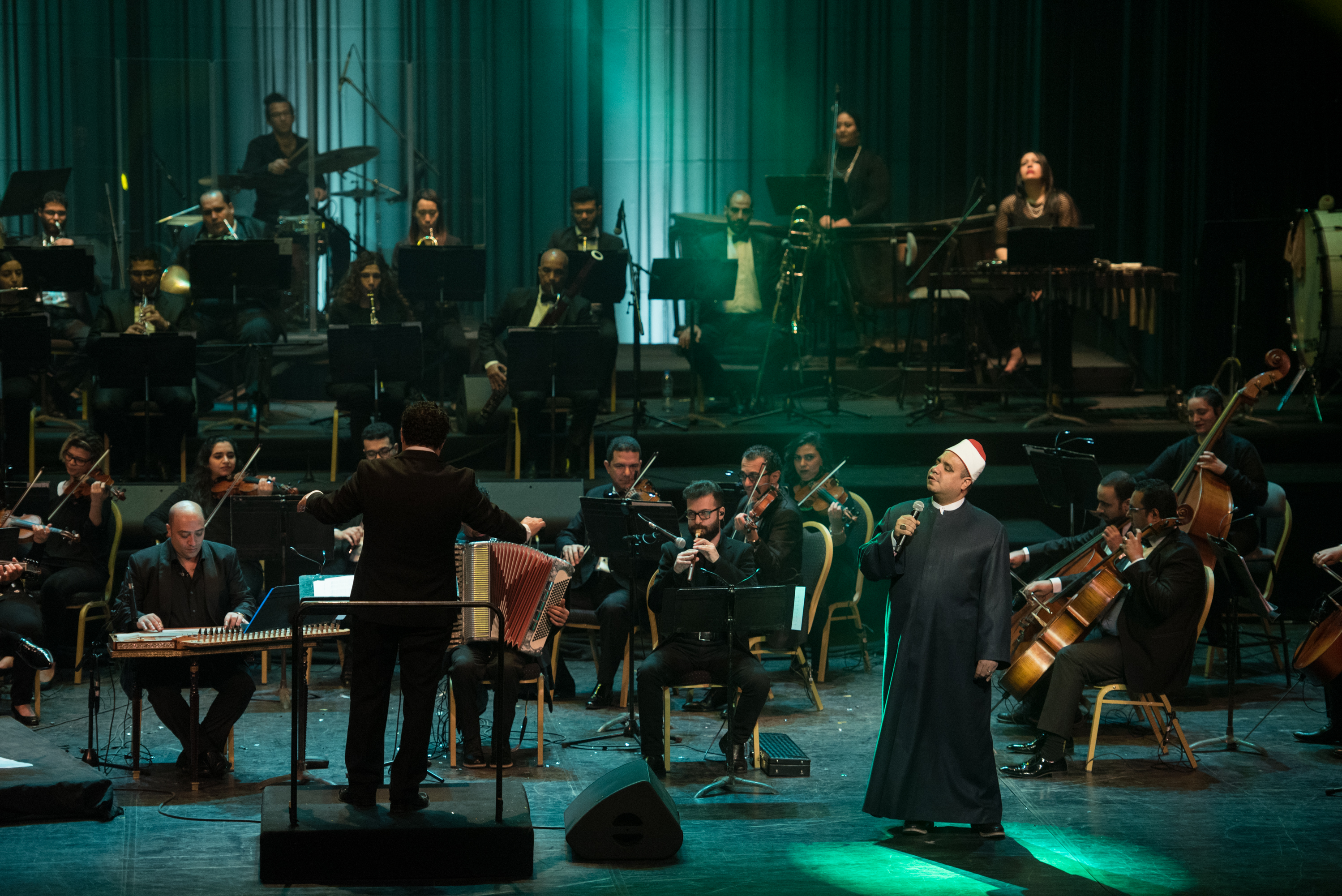
Cairo Opera Orchestra, Cairo steps Ft. Sheikh Ehab Younis

Later that year, on November 2, Cairo Steps participated in the Arab Music Festival, performing at the Cairo Opera House in collaboration with the Cairo Opera Orchestra and Sheikh Ehab Younis. This event underscored their commitment to blending traditional and modern music styles while engaging with diverse audiences.

In March 2023, Cairo Steps released a new single titled L’Imam. The track is inspired by the poem Daa Al-Ayam Tafaal ma Tachaä ("Let the Days Do as They Please") by Imam Al-Shafi'i, a prominent Islamic scholar and the founder of the Shafi'i school of jurisprudence. The single was created in collaboration with Egyptian singer-songwriter Hany Adel, known for his work with the underground music group West Al-Balad. This release reflects the band's ongoing exploration of blending traditional Arabic poetry with contemporary musical influences.

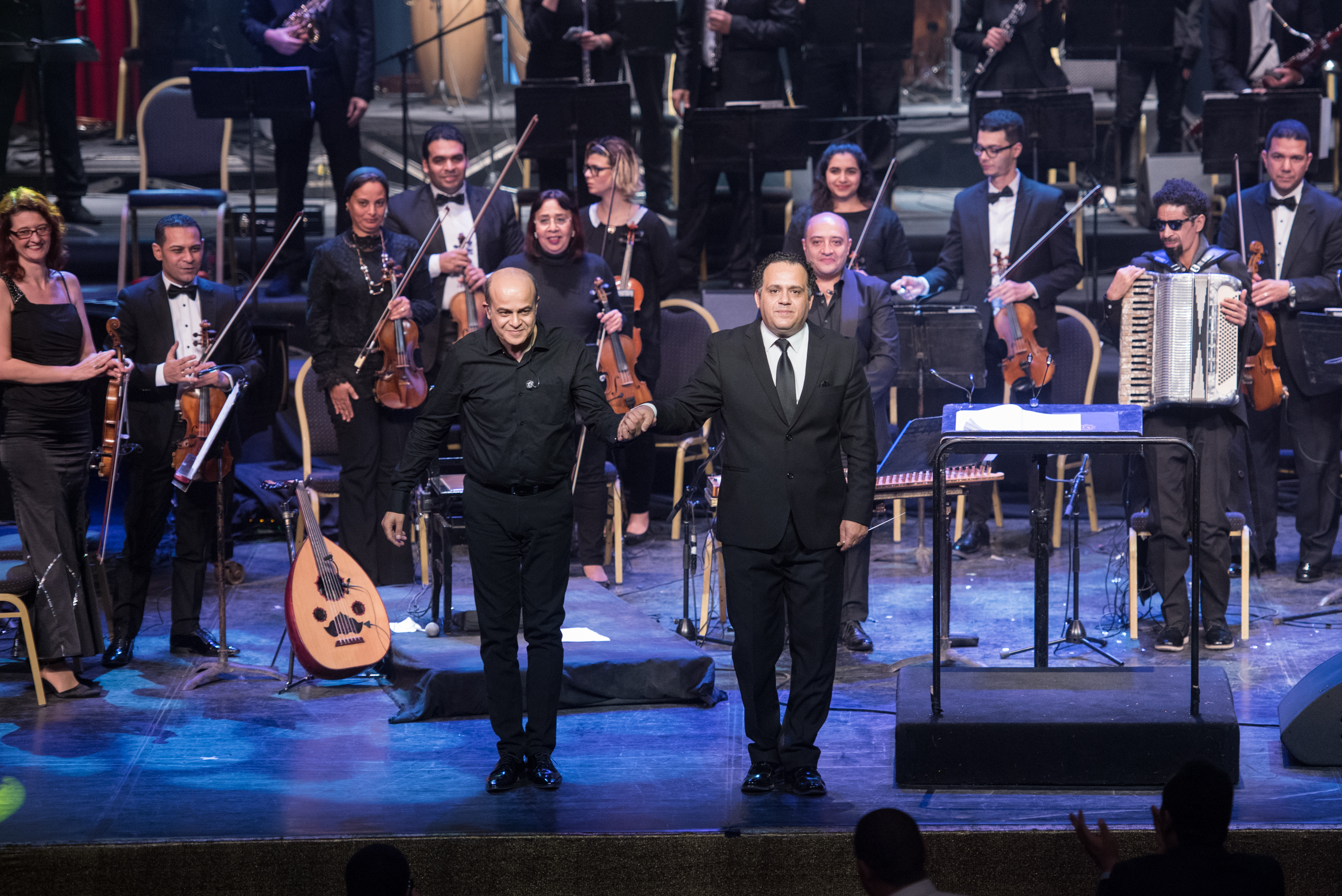
Basem Darwisch, Founder of Cairo Steps with Egyptian Maestro Nayer Nagui, Cairo Oprera House 2019

== Members ==
Cairo Steps consists of many members from different countries:

- Basem Darwisch (Oud)
- Rami Attallah (Piano)
- Max Klaas (Percussions)
- Rageed William (Duduk and Nai)
- Stefan Hergenröder (E-Bass)
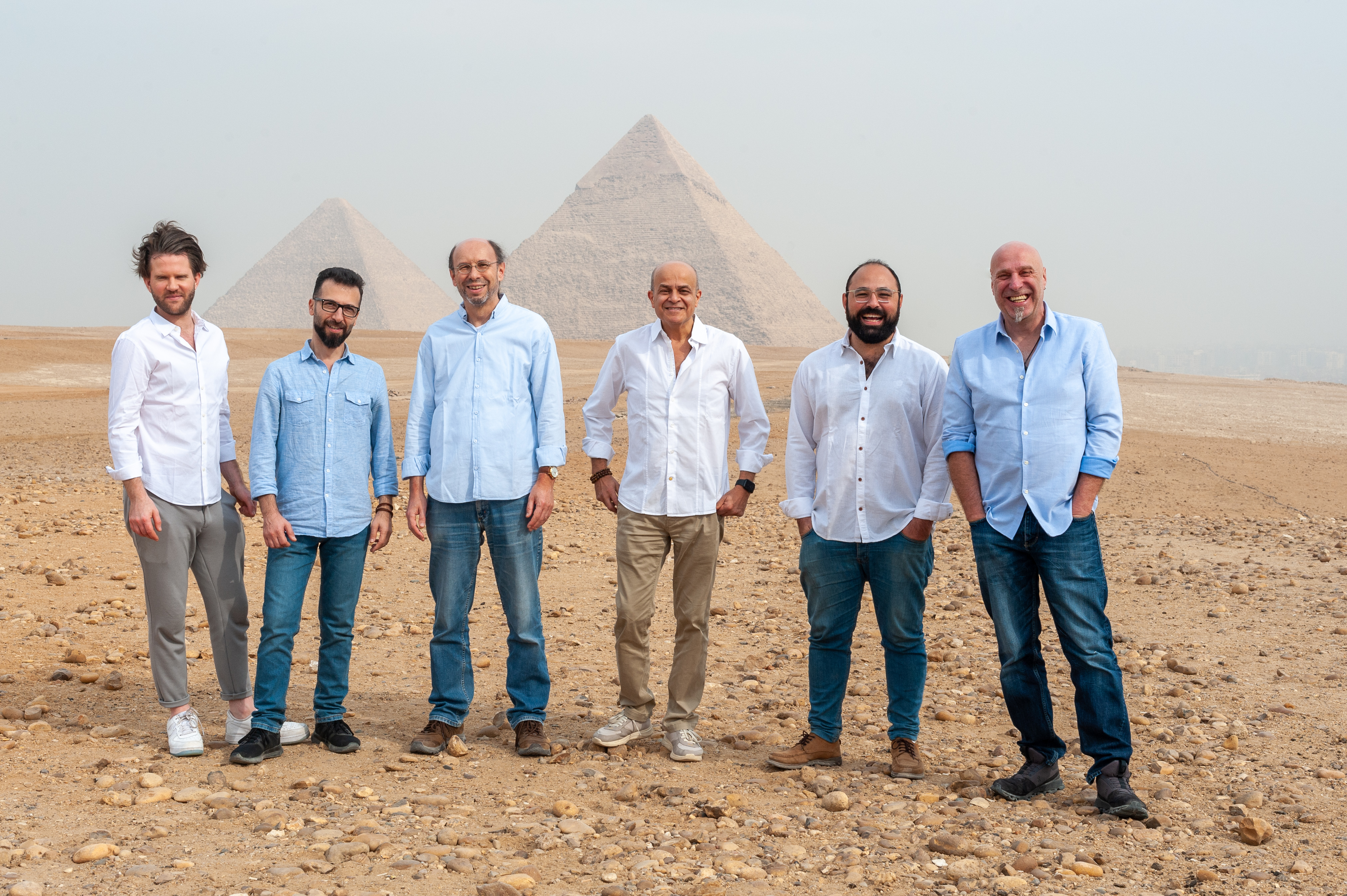
- Cairo Steps members in front of Giza pyramids – 2023
  Wolfgang Wittemann (Soprano Saxophone)

=== Cooperating artists and guests of honor ===
- Mohamed Mounir
- Hany Adel
- Ali El Haggar
- Ali El Helbawi
- Ihab Youness
- Marwa Nagui
- Ines Abdul Dayem

== Discography ==
Basem Darwisch led his team, Cairo Steps, to produce 5 albums and a large number of singles:

Albums and Singles
Year of Release	Album name	Content	Notes
2012	Oud Lounge	1. Cairo Steps*; 2. Memories; 3. Triomania; 4. Samai Darwisch; 5. Sun Rise; 6. Taqsim Oud; 7. Alpha Omega; 8. Desert Road; 9. Min Awel Lamsa	*Cairo Steps was redistributed in another version and released on the same album
2016	Arabiskan	1. Sultan; 2. Nubian Groove; 3. Shams; 4. Amber; 5. Siwa**; 6. Bokra; 7. Alif; 8. La Sua Bucca; 9. Arabiskan*	*Ali El Helbawy sang Arabiskan in Flying Carpet album; **The song (My God) was sung by Marwa Nagy with Siwa Music.
2016	Silk Road	1. Voyage Oriental; 2. Jaipur Express; 3. Constantinople Dance Palace; 4. Floating On Syr Darya; 5. Riders Of Tashkent; 6. Feathers and flames 7. Samarkand 1001; 8. The Prince Of Turfan; 9. Taklan Makan; 10. Moon Over Issyk kul 11. Market Of Kashgar	
2017	Flying Carpet	1. Sansibar; 2. Khaliji Steps; 3. Shams; 4. Dance Du Nil; 5. Arabiskan	
2020–21	Diwan Cafe	Oud Suite	feat. Basem Darwisch
2020–21	Diwan Cafe	Reprise	feat. Wolfgang Wittemann
2020–21	Diwan Cafe	Malek AlMolk	feat. Sheikh Ehab Youness
2020–21	Diwan Cafe	Cairo Vibe	feat. Rami Attallah
2020–21	Diwan Cafe	Ward	feat. Rageed William
2020–21	Diwan Cafe	Elahi	feat. Ousso Lotfy
2020–21	Diwan Cafe	El Anfoushi	feat. Wael El Sayed
2020–21	Diwan Cafe	El Zaitoun	feat. Ragy Kamal
2020–21	Diwan Cafe	Fayoum	feat. John Sami
	Electronic Music (With: Sam Shure)	1. Iboto; 2. Mirage; 3. Sultan; 4. Arabiskan	
	Soundtrack	Seven to One	
	Inspirational Music	Oud Mood of the day	
	Inspirational Music	Duduk and Oud dialog mood	With Rageed William
2014	Singles	Gnossienne No.1	Remix feat Sheikh Ehab Younis
2014	Singles	I can Say	feat. Maher Fayez.
2014–2015	Singles	Je nai nan	feat. Sheikh Ehab Younis, Ali El Helbawy, Monica George and Peter Ghattas.
2015	Singles	Aripsalin	feat. Monica George and Peter Ghattas.
2015	Singles	Mariam	feat. Monica George and Peter Ghattas.
2015	Singles	Beredak	Remix feat Marwa Nagy
2015	Singles	Al Mokhtar	Remix feat Marwa Nagy
2015	Singles	Gnossienne	New Remix
2017	Singles	Palladio	New Remix
2017	Singles	Adagio	Remix feat Sheikh Ehab Younis
2017	Singles	Desert Road	Wahba's Moonlight Remix
2020	Singles	Malek ElMolk	feat. Sheikh Ehab Younis
2023	Singles	Daa Al-Ayam Tafaal ma Tachaä ("Let the Days Do as They Please")	feat. Hany Adel
