= Oliver Schwerdt =

German musicologist

Oliver Schwerdt (born 13 November 1979) is a German musicologist and musician (piano, percussion) in the field of free improvisation.

== Academic career ==
Born in Eisenach, Schwerdt attended school in Eisenach until his university entrance qualification and received classical piano lessons at the municipal music school there. He did his military service as a piano accompanist in the training music corps of the German armed forces. He began his studies of music and cultural sciences as well as art history at the Leipzig University in 1999 and completed them in 2006 with a master's thesis on Georg Simmel and Dadaism submitted to Klaus Christian Köhnke. In 2012 he received his doctorate from Sebastian Klotz at the Institute for Musicology at the University of Leipzig, for which he also worked as a lecturer. His dissertation focuses on the musical strategies of central actors in the scene of free improvised music in the wake of Free Jazz and their spatial theoretical interpretation. He has taught at the Museum of Musical Instruments of Leipzig University and with the Bauhaus Dessau Foundation.

From his musicological work, Schwerdt identified the challenge facing contemporary museum practice in relation to the "reinvention of the drum set combination" as they are "in European improvised music" of the 20th century became reality. He is committed to securing the "acutely endangered, historically so delicate, aesthetically highly fascinating and epistemologically valuable object complexes". the first generation of European free jazz or contemporary improvised music. As an author of music-critical articles, Schwerdt wrote for the Neue Musikzeitung, the Jazzthetik and the Jazzzeitung, among others. He also wrote accompanying texts for albums by Günter Sommer/Wadada Leo Smith and Alexander von Schlippenbach/Evan Parker/Paul Lovens and Urs Leimgruber. In 2003 he founded the publishing house Euphorium Productions.

== Activity as a musician ==
Since 1999 Schwerdt has been artistic director of the EUPHORIUM_freakestra, a project ensemble between contemporary improvisation, jazz, Neue Musik and theatre with Günter Sommer, Friedrich Schenker, Rudi Mahall, Paul Rutherford, Ernst-Ludwig Petrowsky, Frank Möbus, Wadada Leo Smith, Axel Dörner, Barre Phillips, Alexander von Schlippenbach, Evan Parker, Paul Lovens, Sven-Åke Johansson, Ulrich Gumpert, Manfred Hering, Dietmar Diesner, Roger Turner, Barry Guy, Akira Sakata and others worked together. At the 2009 33. Leipziger Jazztage, he performed with the project Transatlantic Freedom Suite Tentets at the Leipzig Opera.

From the project ensemble the quartet ember with Urs Leimgruber developed, Alexander Schubert and Christian Lillinger. From 2006 to 2016 Schwerdt worked with Lillinger and Petrowsky in the New Old Luten Trio. The recording of Petrowsky's late works, documented from 2013 to 2015 with the albums Tumult!, Krawall!, Rabatz! in a quintet formation expanded by the double bassists John Edwards and Robert Landfermann received great attention. With Schubert and Friedrich Kettlitz, Schwerdt operates the electrified Noise-Ensemble trnn.

In 2006, Schwerdt received the Leipzig Jazz Young Talent Scholarship of the Marion-Ermer-Foundation for his performance as pianist and ensemble leader. The critics Ken Waxman (Jazzword) and Rigobert Dittmann (Bad Alchemy) hear reminiscences of Oscar Peterson, Bill Evans, Cecil Taylor and Alexander von Schlippenbach in Schwerdt's piano playing.

Schwerdt uses the following pseudonyms: Edithrakneff Weinermond, Frautastem!, Ingrid Ingulfwieher, Rita Deixis, Solveig Reberp-Klamt and Elan Pauer.

== Discography ==
=== As leader ===
- Dry Swing/Tandem Spaces with Günter Sommer (Euphorium, 2013)
- Peripherduette with Romondoprath Ulfkutter (Euphorium, 2013) ISBN 978-3944301273
- Prestige/No Smoking (Euphorium, 2017)
- Storming Bauhaus (Euphorium, 2019)

With Ember

- Oullh d'baham (Euphorium, 2006)
- Aurona Arona (Creative Sources, 2008)

With Euphorium Freakestra

- 2 Trios & 2 Babies (Euphorium, 2006)
- Free Electric Supergroup (Euphorium, 2007)
- Die Abenteuer des Birg Borgenthal (Euphorium, 2017)
- Grande Casino (Euphorium, 2018)

With others

- Karacho! with Peter Brötzmann (Euphorium, 2019)
- Tumult!/Krawall!/Rabatz! with Ernst-Ludwig Petrowsky, John Edwards, Robert Landfermann and Christian Lillinger (Euphorium, 2017)

== Publications ==
- Mein Bauhausgang. Eine Harzreise durch die moderne Architektur. (EUPHORIUM: EUPH 023, 2016) ISBN 978-3-944301-35-8
- Jubelheft für Baby. Festschrift zum 70. Geburtstag Günter Sommers. (EUPHORIUM: EUPH 042, 2013) ISBN 978-3-944301-28-0
- Baby Sommer XXL! Wie der Schlagzeuger mit dem Free Jazz den Raum bestellt. Die große Monografie zu Günter Sommers Siebzigsten! 5 Bände (EUPHORIUM: EUPH 038e, 2012) ISBN 978-3-944301-15-0
- Zur Konstitution, Repräsentation und Transformation des Räumlichen in der Musik. Eine Untersuchung des von Günter Sommer realisierten Symbol-, Instrumental- und Handlungs-Raums. (EUPHORIUM: EUPH 038c, 2012) ISBN 978-3-944301-13-6
- Geld und Unsinn, Georg Simmel und der Dadaismus. Eine systematische Studie zu relativistischer Philosophie und Kunst. (EUPHORIUM: EUPH 022, 2011) ISBN 978-3-944301-09-9
