= Ernst-Ludwig Petrowsky =

German saxophonist (1933–2023)

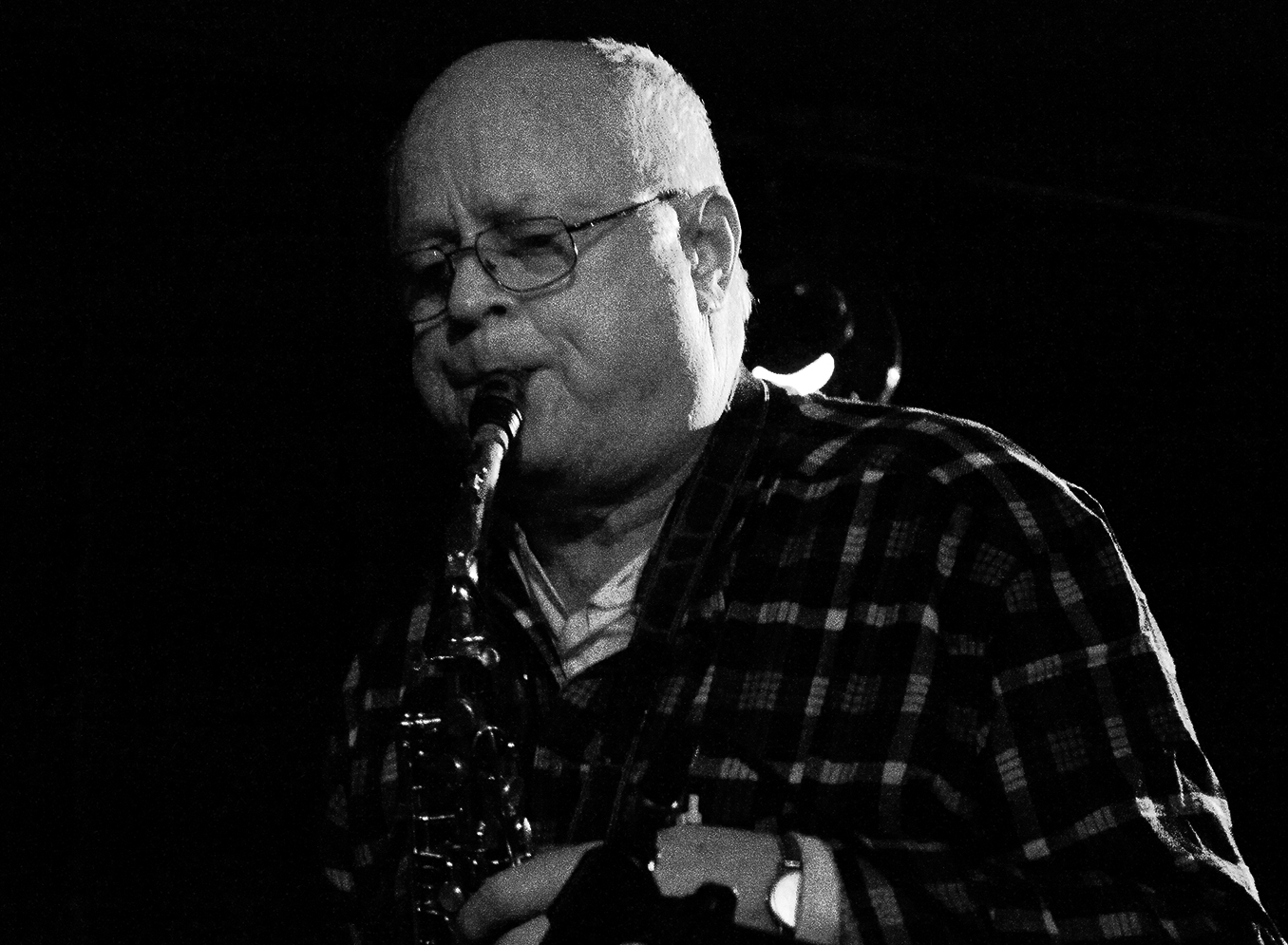
- Petrowsky at Berlin Jazzclub Aufsturz in 2006
- Born: 10 December 1933; Güstrow, German Reich
- Died: 10 July 2023 (aged 89); Berlin, Germany
- Other name: Luten Petrowsky
- Occupations: Saxophonist; clarinetist; composer
- Organizations: Synopsis; Zentralquartett
- Spouse: Uschi Brüning (m. 1982)
- Awards: Nationalpreis der DDR; German Jazz Award; Deutscher Jazzpreis

Ernst-Ludwig Petrowsky (10 December 1933 – 10 July 2023), often called Luten Petrowsky, was a German jazz saxophonist, clarinetist, flautist, composer and author. He is considered the father of free jazz in East Germany (GDR). He was one of few jazz musicians permitted to play in the West already in the 1960s. Petrowsky played in the 1973 quartet recording Just for fun, the first of jazz musicians from both East and West. He took part in more than a hundred recordings between 1963 and 2016, with groups such as Synopsis and Zentralquartett, and with his singer wife, Uschi Brüning.

== Life and career ==
Petrowsky was born in Güstrow on 10 December 1933. He attended school with Uwe Johnson, later to become a novelist. He received violin lessons for six years. As a jazz musician he was self-taught, having listened to records. He began studies of music pedagogy at the Musikhochschule Weimar in 1956 but dropped out. From 1957 he played in various bands. He became a founding member of the Manfred Ludwig Sextet in 1964, which was important for GDR jazz, playing with Joachim Kühn, Dorothy Ellison and Ruth Hohmann, among others. On 13 June 1968, Petrowsky participated in the Montreux Jazz Festival together with the Studio IV jazz ensemble, the first band in the GDR playing jazz regularly. In 1971 he founded the jazz-rock band SOK with Ulrich Gumpert and in 1973 was one of the founders of the free jazz formation Synopsis. Since 1972 he worked in various formations with the bassist Klaus Koch.

The 1973 recording Just for fun in a quartet with trombonist Conny Bauer, Koch and percussionist Wolfgang Winkler, published by FMP, was the first of jazz musicians from both East and West, and resulted in further collaboration in recordings, concerts, and tours, such as the Globe Unity Orchestra, the George Gruntz Concert Jazz Band and the Tony Oxley Celebration Orchestra, in Europe and the United States. Petrowsky was also a member of the European Jazz Ensemble and the Günter Lenz Springtime. He played in the various Gumpert workshop bands and from 1984 with the Synopsis successor, the Zentralquartett, a formation that played jazz improvisations also based on Volkslied, workmen's songs and marches. He performed with Harry Miller, Heinz Becker, Joe Sachse and Tony Oxley in 1981 as part of the Jazzwerkstatt Peitz.

Petrowsky became especially popular beginning in 1983 through his joint concerts with his wife, the singer Uschi Brüning, whom he married in 1982. From 2006 to 2016 Petrowsky performed with percussionist Christian Lillinger and Oliver Schwerdt as the New Old Luten Trio.

On the occasion of his 80th birthday, JazzFest Berlin honored Petrowsky with a Jubilee evening featuring three of his important groups, the Zentralquartett, the group Ruf der Heimat (with Thomas Borgmann, Christoph Winckel, and Willi Kellers), which has been in existence since 1992, and the ensemble Ornette et cetera, with Brüning, Jeanfrançois Prins and Michael Griener. Zentralquartett then went on a farewell tour.

Petrowsky said about jazz:

Im Jazz geht man immer ein Abenteuer ein, mit sich selbst, mit den Mitmusikern und mit dem eigenen Instrument. Es ist jedes Mal eine Herausforderung, bei der man über den eigenen Schatten zu springen gezwungen ist. Sonst wäre es kein Jazz!

In jazz, you always go on an adventure, with yourself, with your fellow musicians and with your own instrument. It's a challenge every time, where you are forced to jump over your own shadow. Otherwise it wouldn't be jazz!

— "Geschmeidige Freiheit"

=== Personal life ===
Petrowsky was married to the singer Uschi Brüning from 1982.

Petrowsky died in Berlin on 10 July 2023, at age 89, after a long serious illness.

== Recordings ==
Petrowsky took part in 127 recordings between 1963 and 2016, including:

- Petrowsky Quartett: Just for Fun (LP; FMP, 1973)
- Synopsis: Auf der Elbe schwimmt ein rosa Krokodil (LP; FMP, 1974)
- Synopsis: Synopsis (LP; Amiga, 1974)
- Ernst-Ludwig Petrowsky (LP; Amiga, 1978)
- Petrowsky Quartett: Selb-Viert (LP; FMP, 1980)
- Petrowsky Trio: Selb-Dritt (LP; FMP, 1982)
- Uschi Brüning & Ernst-Ludwig Petrowsky Kontraste (LP/CD; Amiga, 1988)
- Ruf der Heimat: Machine Kaput (Konnex Records, 1996)
- White Power Blues with Oliver Schwerdt and Christian Lillinger (CD; Euphorium, 2008)
- Ernst-Ludwig Petrowsky / Uschi Brüning / Jeanfrançois Prins / Michael Griener Ornette et cetera (CD; jazzwerkstatt, 2012)
- Rabatz! with Elan Pauer, John Edwards, Robert Landfermann, Christian Lillinger (CD; Euphorium, 2017; Vierteljahresliste 1/2018 Deutscher Schallplattenpreis)
- Ernst-Ludwig Petrowsky, Conny Bauer: Wanderung durch den Thüringer Wald (jazzwerkstatt 2011, ed. 2019)
- Bergisch-Brandenburgisches Quartett: BBQ Live '82 (rec. 1982, ed. 2022), with Hans Reichel, Rüdiger Carl und Sven-Åke Johansson

== Awards ==
Petrowsky was awarded the Kunstpreis der DDR in 1982, also the Nationalpreis der DDR. He received the German Jazz Award in 1997. In 2010, he and his wife received the European Jazz Prize. In 2022, he was awarded the Deutscher Jazzpreis for his life's achievements; his wife received the award on his behalf, as he was already too ill to attend.
