= Emily Howard =

British composer (born 1979)

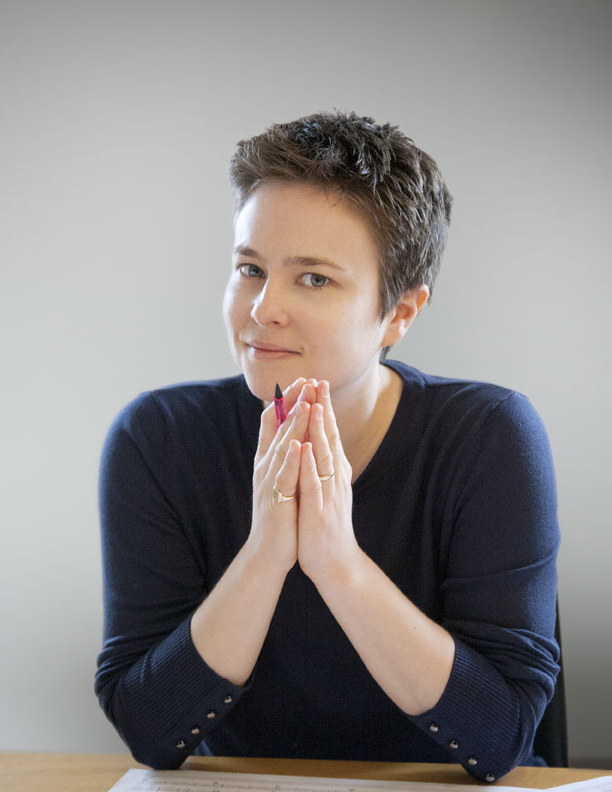
- Born: 23 February 1979 (age 47); Liverpool
- Education: Lincoln College, Oxford; Royal Northern College of Music; University of Manchester
- Occupation: Composer
- Notable work: Antisphere (2019); The Anvil (2019); Torus (2016); Magnetite (2007)
- Website: www.emilyhoward.com

Emily Howard (born 23 February 1979 in Liverpool) is a British composer based in Manchester. The winner of two British Composer Ivor Novello Awards, her work is best known for its innovative connection with mathematical shapes and processes, and more broadly for the fusion between music, mathematics and multimedia. Howard is Professor in Composition and Head of Artistic Research at the Royal Northern College of Music. She holds Honorary Fellowships at Lincoln College, Oxford University, and The Royal Academy of Arts. In 2025 she was appointed to The Ivors Academy’s Board as a Director.

== Early life ==
Howard was born in Liverpool, England. In 1993 Howard competed in the British Chess championship placing first among the girls, earning her the title of British girls' under-14 champion. After completing a degree in mathematics and computer science at Lincoln College, Oxford, Howard studied composition at the Royal Northern College of Music (MMus) and the University of Manchester (PhD).

== Career ==
In 2008, Howard was commissioned to write a work for the Royal Liverpool Philharmonic Orchestra to mark Liverpool's recognition as a European Capital of Culture in 2008. The resulting piece, Magnetite, received critical acclaim, and Howard went on to win an award from the Paul Hamlyn Foundation.

In 2010, Howard became the inaugural UBS Composer in Residence with the London Symphony Orchestra (LSO) at the Bridge Academy in Hackney, writing Solar (2010) for the LSO conducted by Nicholas Collon, a work that the Financial Times praised for its ability 'to suggest galactic power on a compact scale'. In 2011, Howard's music was the focus of Wien Modern, which saw performances of Magnetite in the Musikverein (by the Tonkünstler Orchestra under Andrés Orozco-Estrada), Solar and Calculus of the Nervous System (2011) in the Wiener Konzerthaus (performed by the Vienna Radio Symphony Orchestra with Sir James MacMillan).

Meanwhile, Howard continued to explore musical wordplay and wrote the operatic biopic Zátopek!, commissioned by Second Movement as part of New Music 20x12 for the 2012 London Cultural Olympiad, and the Ada sketches, premiered at the Royal Opera House's Linbury Theatre. In the same year, Mesmerism, a Diamond Jubilee commission for the Liverpool Mozart Orchestra with pianist Alexandra Dariescu, won a British Composer Award.

Howard's output has focused around a series of recurrent topoi and phenomena: responses to text; the mathematician and writer Ada Lovelace; protest and suffrage; and mathematical and scientific processes in general. Howard is keen to underline the divide between mathematics as creative catalyst as opposed to a literal illustrative framework: Simon Rattle once remarked 'her music doesn't feel the least bit mechanical – she has her own very particular sound world'.

Howard collaborated with mathematician Marcus du Sautoy to create string quartet Four Musical Proofs and a Conjecture, which was premiered at the New Scientist Live Festival in 2017. In recent years, Howard has explored what she terms 'orchestral geometries', with several large-scale works that evoke shapes and processes. Torus, a 2016 BBC Proms commission, was described by The Times as 'visionary' and won the orchestral category of the 2017 British Composer Awards.

The Barbican Centre commissioned Howard for a further instalment in her orchestral geometries for Rattle and the London Symphony Orchestra: Antisphere opened the 2019–20 season, and was critically well-received by both musical and scientific communities. Bethan Ackerley, writing in the New Scientist, declared it ‘triumphant’, describing ‘a shimmering klaxon that sounds like the workings of some near-future mechanism’.

That same year The Anvil: An Elegy for Peterloo, for orchestra, chorus and soloists with a text by Michael Symmons Roberts, was performed by Kate Royal, Christopher Purves, three Hallé Choirs, the BBC Singers and BBC Philharmonic under Ben Gernon at the Manchester International Festival, who described Howard as one of British music's 'most original voices'.

Howard's music was also the subject of the Barbican's high-profile Life Rewired season in 2019, which explored artistic responses to society and technology. Howard curated 'Ada Lovelace: Imagining the Analytical Engine', an evening of new music and discussion in honour of mathematician Ada Lovelace.

Howard's first full-length opera, To See The Invisible (2018), was an Aldeburgh Festival commission with a text by Selma Dimitrijevic after a short sci-fi story by Robert Silverberg. The Telegraph remarked that the opera demonstrated that 'Howard's idiom has a cool confidence and clarity of its own' while the Times observed that the achievement 'raised hopes for Howard's future work'.

During the COVID-19 pandemic, Torus was selected as an archive broadcast both as an afternoon concert (performed by the BBC Symphony Orchestra under Martyn Brabbins) in July 2020, and as a choice archive performance in the lockdown BBC Proms on 27 August. Howard once again worked with Piatti Quartet for the work Shield, which they co-commissioned with Het Concertgebouw Concertgebouw, Amsterdam, the Fidelio Trust, the Nicholas Boas Charitable Trust and PRiSM. Owing to the restrictions of the pandemic, Howard found completion of the work challenging; it finally received its premiere by the Piatti in the Amsterdam Concertgebouw in November 2022. It is dedicated to the memory of composer Lucy Hale, one of Howard’s former pupils.

Earlier in 2022, Howard had again collaborated with poet Symmons Roberts on her work Elliptics (2022), a setting of his poem for solo soprano, solo counter tenor and orchestra. Commissioned by the BBC Philharmonic, with support from PRiSM, the intensity of her vocal writing was warmly received, with Robert Beale noting, “the vocal writing … is striking and beautiful in its effect, and as the poem progresses the elegiac, even valedictory, nature of the music grows and takes on a gentler, mourning, nature.” The following year it was nominated for Best Orchestral Composition at the Ivors Classical Awards.

2023 saw three distinct recordings published of Howard’s work. Two separate CD releases of major orchestral works marked a significant expansion in Howard’s recorded catalogue: an NMC disc titled after Torus; and a Delphian Records recording of The Anvil. Pianist and composer Zubin Kanga also recorded and premiered her new work DEVIANCE, for solo piano and electronics, which was commissioned for him as part of Cyborg Soloists, with the support of a UKRI Future Leaders Fellowship and Royal Holloway, University of London. NMC’s disc Torus, comprising a recording of that work, along with Antisphere and Sphere, were performed by the BBC Symphony Orchestra, BBC Philharmonic and BBC NOW, respectively, whilst smaller work Compass was recorded by the Birmingham Contemporary Music Group. It was well-received, with BBC Music Magazine noting that the ‘recordings sit on the edge of discomfort, relishing in the stark contrasts of timbres available to an orchestra’ and praising ‘music-making at its most dynamic’ whilst The Wire commended the ‘energetic impact and imaginative breadth’ of the album. It was nominated for Gramophone Contemporary Award 2024.

The Anvil, too, received critical praise; the combined efforts of BBC Philharmonic, The Hallé choirs and soloists Kate Royal, Claire Booth, Hugh Cutting and Christopher Purves were met with acclaim, with The Sunday Times observing they were ‘thrust magnificently into the fray’, and Classical Music Daily finding it ‘one of the most original and fascinating works I have listened to in some time.’ The disc went on to be nominated at the Presto Classical Awards, and in the Premiere Award category at the BBC Music Magazine Awards.

In 2024 Ligament, a work for small ensemble, received a US world premiere at the Roulette Intermedium in Brooklyn. It was co-commissioned by PRiSM and the International Contemporary Ensemble in New York, who gave the first performance.

In 2025, Howard rekindled her creative relationship with Manchester International Festival, writing music for the multidisciplinary artwork A Possibility by Dutch artist Germaine Kruip alongside American multi-instrumentalist composer Hahn Rowe. I Love Manchester praised the collaboration as an ‘unmissable feast’ for the senses, commenting positively on Howard’s score transforming the space into ‘a world of wonder’.

== Selected discography ==
- Torus (NMC), NMC D274 (2023)
- The Anvil (Delphian), DCD34285-CD (2023)
- Magnetite (NMC), NMCD219 (2016)
- Zátopek! (NMC), NMCDL2012-10 (2012)
- Sky and Water featured in John McCabe: Farewell Recital (Toccata Classics), TOCC0139 (2011)
- Wild Clematis in Winter featured in The NMC Songbook (NMC), NMCD150 (2009)
- Outback in A Garland For John McCabe (Divine Art), DDA25166 (2018)
- Masquerade for basset clarinet and piano featured in Prism: New Works for Clarinet (NMC), NMCD139 (2011)
- Cloud Chamber featured in Paul Vowles's recital disc (Prima Facie), PFCD035 (2015)

== Music style ==
Howard uses a broad range of sonic colour, at times exploring the extremities of instrumental and vocal timbre. Architectural shape and narrative arc are important elements in her writing. The overlap between music, maths and computer science is reflected in some of the titles, for example Calculus of the Nervous System (2011) and the 2013 children's work Pi (a Pie?). Her interest in chess is also referenced in Chaos or Chess (2016), which borrows its title from a line written by poet Geoffrey Hill. Word-setting and word play are equally important features in Howard's oeuvre, such as the recent use of Ada Lovelace's text in the ‘But then, what are these numbers?’ (2019).

== Personal ==
Howard's father used to play in the Liverpool Mozart Orchestra with Simon Rattle. The composer was British Junior Girls Chess Champion from 1990 to 1996.

== Selected works ==
=== Works for orchestra ===
- Antisphere (2019)
- sphere (2017)
- Torus (2016)
- Axon (2013)
- Calculus of the Nervous System (2011)
- Solar (2010)
- Magnetite (2007)

=== Chamber orchestra ===
- Mesmerism (2011)
- Lachrymose (2006)
- Passacaglia (2002)

=== Orchestra with choir ===
- The Anvil (2019)

=== Opera and vocal ===
- To See The Invisible (2018)
- Zátopek! (2012)

=== Solo vocal ===
- But then, what are these numbers? (2019)
- Threnos (2015)
- Ada sketches (2011)
- Songs from Dickens (2010)
- Wild Clematis in Winter (2008)

=== Choral ===
- Two Songs after Friday Afternoons (2013)
- Ite Fortes (2006)

=== Ensemble ===
- Carillon (2013)
- Settle (2010)
- Obsidian (2010)
- Broken Hierarchies (2008)
- Dualities (2005)

=== Chamber ===
- Four Musical Proofs and a Conjecture (2017)
- Afference (2014)
- Deconstruction V (2012)
- Zugzwänge (2012)
- Broken Hierarchies II (2009)
- The Summoning of Mephisto (2007)

=== Solo ===
- Outlier (2018)
- Chaos or Chess (2016)
- Orbits (2015)
- Leviathan (2015)
- Masquerade (2009)
- Cloud Chamber (2006)
- Sky and Water (2005)
