= Soundbrenner =

Music technology company based in Hong Kong

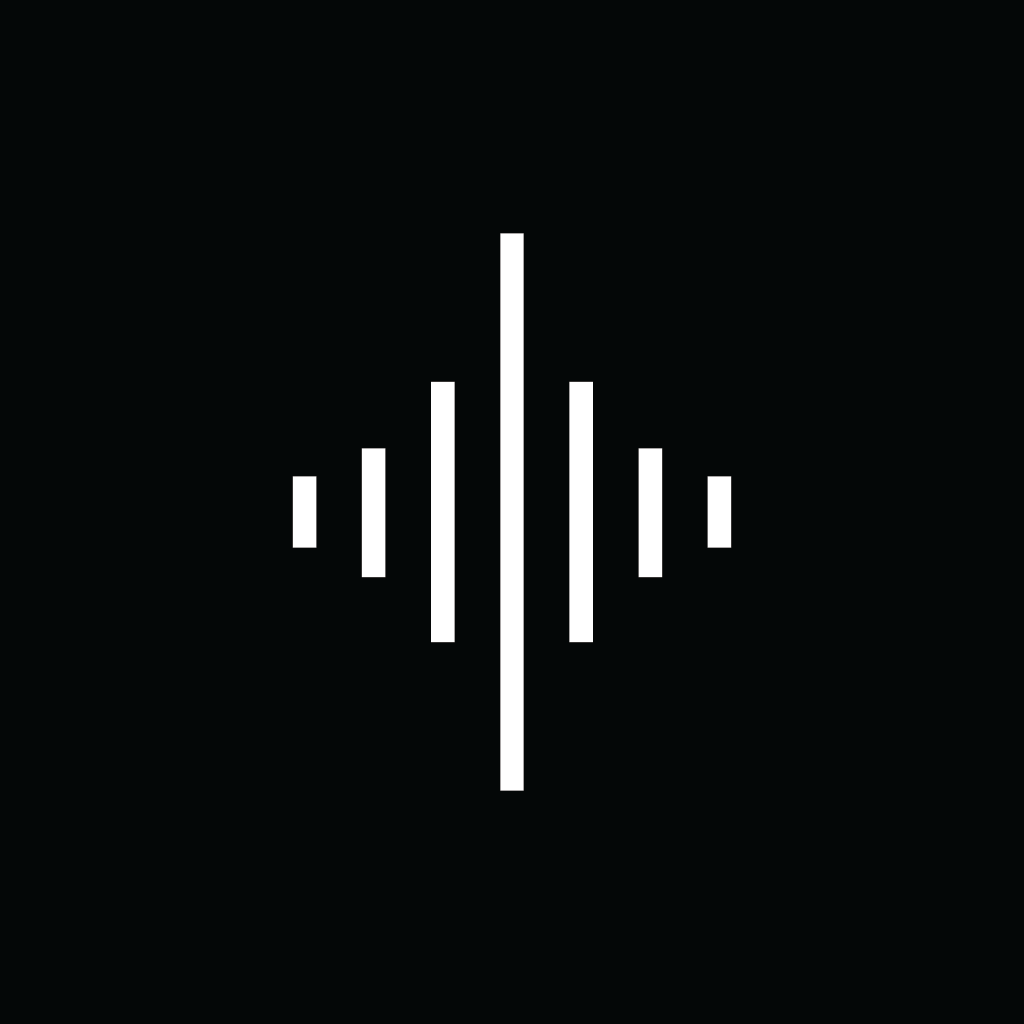
- Company type: Private
- Industry: Music technology, D2C music electronics
- Founded: 2014; 12 years ago
- Founders: Florian Simmendinger; Julian Vogels; Vinh-Nghi Tiet
- Headquarters: Sheung Wan, Hong Kong
- Area served: Worldwide
- Key people: Florian Simmendinger (CEO)
- Products: Wearable technology, Music software
- Revenue: US$10 million
- Website: www.soundbrenner.com

Soundbrenner is a multinational music technology company based in Hong Kong and Germany, that develops wearable devices and application softwares designed to assist musicians with practice and performance. Its products having global availability of features including vibrating metronome, practice tracking, musical tuning, sound level monitoring and dB meter measurements.

Soundbrenner is the maker of the world's first wearable devices for musicians. It has a global reach with its products available in music stores in over 40 countries and its Android and iOS apps used by musicians worldwide.

== History ==
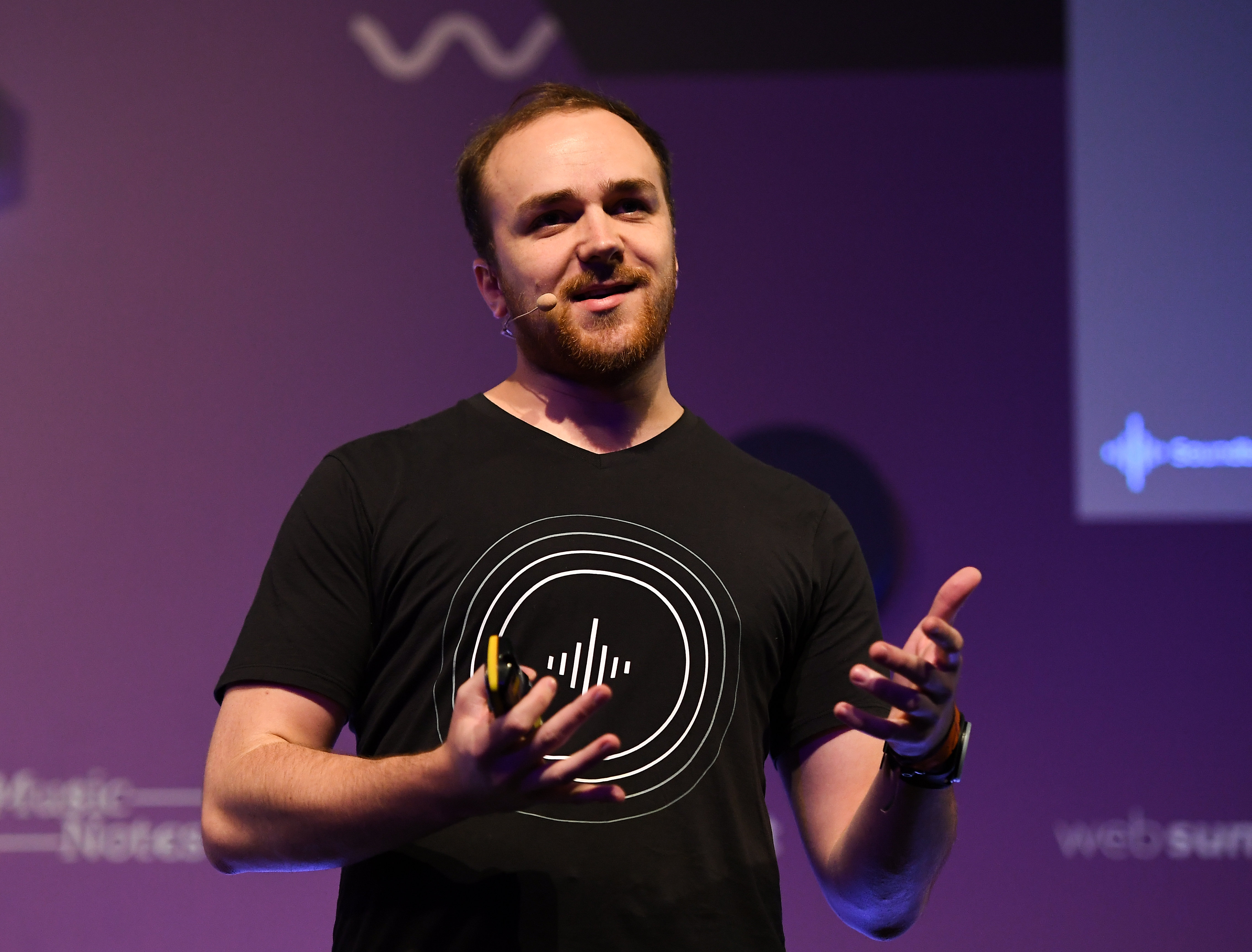
Florian Simmendinger, founder and CEO of Soundbrenner

Soundbrenner was founded in 2014 by Florian Simmendinger, Julian Vogels and Vinh Nghi Tiet. It is primarily based in Sheung Wan, Hong Kong; Its European headquarters (technical operations) is located in Berlin, Germany. The company launched its first product, Soundbrenner Pulse, a wearable vibrating metronome, through a crowdfunding campaign on Indiegogo. In 2017, Soundbrenner appeared on Die Höhle der Löwen, the German version of Shark Tank, where the founders sought US$1.5 million in exchange for 10% equity. The show brought significant exposure to the company and its innovative wearable metronome, which is a vibrating watch-like wearable device that vibrates to the rhythm and can help with both practices and performances.

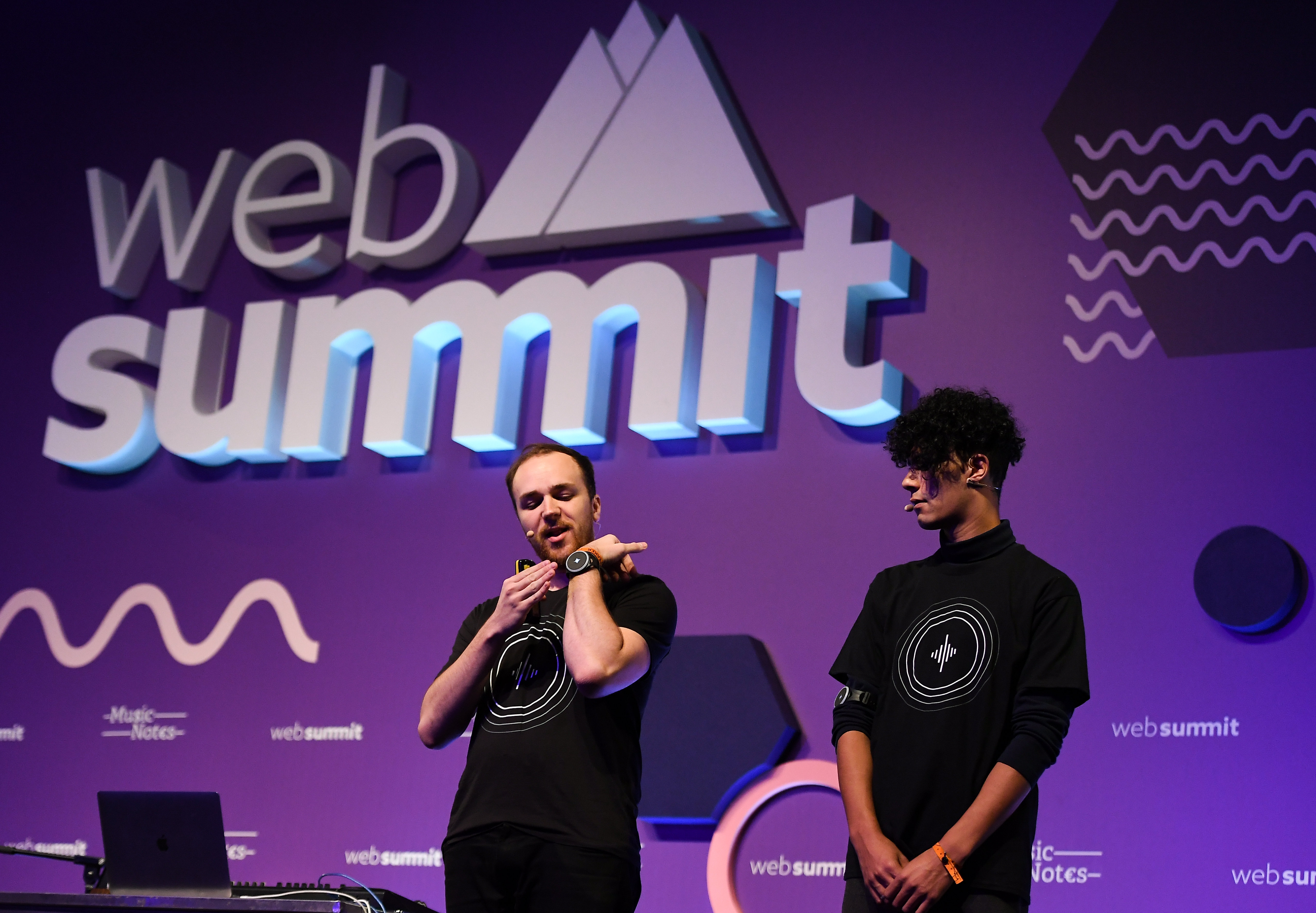
Team Soundbrenner showing newly launched wearable metronomes during the Web Summit 2018 at the Altice Arena in Lisbon, Portugal

Since its inception, Soundbrenner has raised funds through multiple rounds, including $500,000 in 2015 and $1.5 million from angel investors in 2017 to support product development and expand into new markets. The AI enabled and haptic metronomes of Soundbrenner are globally accepted and used by noted musicians including Australian musicologist Zubin Kanga and Canadian audio-visual artist Luke Nickel. Soundbrenner's key investors include Jaan Tallinn (co-founder of Skype), Sonny Vu (co-founder of Misfit), Yat Siu (CEO of Animoca Brands) and Matthias Knobloch (CEO of Betatron).

== Products ==
=== Soundbrenner Pulse ===
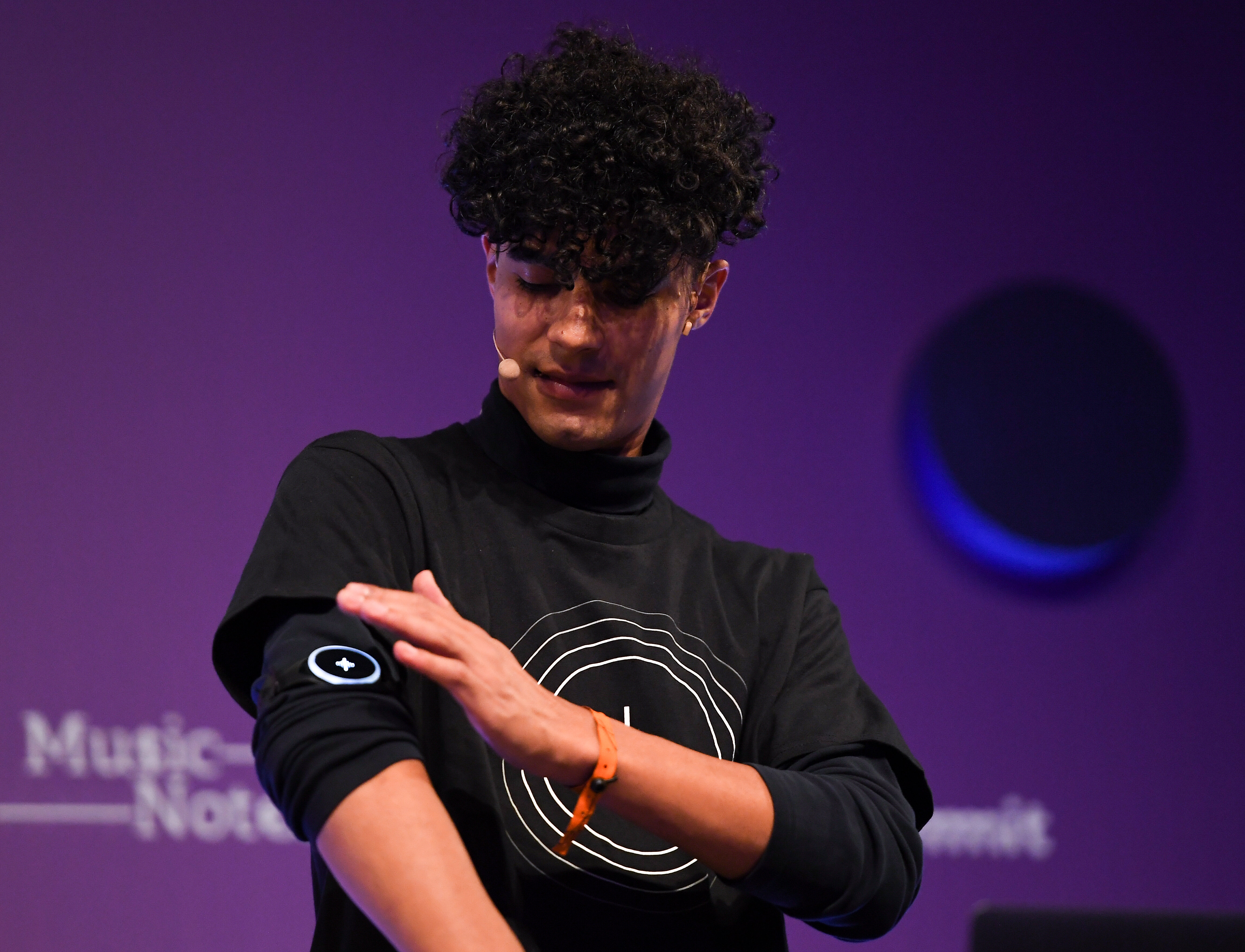
James Thomas Morley, digital content producer of Soundbrenner Ltd., showing the activities of Soundbrenner Pulse worn in his right arm during the Web Summit 2018 at the Altice Arena in Lisbon, Portugal

Soundbrenner Pulse, containing USB charging stations and two wearable bands (one short, one long), released in 2015, is a wearable metronome designed to help musicians keep time through tactile vibrations. It connects wirelessly to mobile apps for tempo control, synchronization, and advanced features such as setlists and rhythm libraries. It can be worn on the wrist, arm, ankle, thigh, shoulder, or chest and connects to the Soundbrenner app via Bluetooth for enhanced functionality. The Pulse is designed to allow musicians to feel the beat without needing to rely on auditory cues, making it suitable for both practice sessions and live performances.

Soundbrenner Pulse comes up with a 7G ERM motor within the box alongside a magnetic charging station and USB cable. Publications such as Sound on Sound noted its innovative design, while Gizmodo highlighted its ability to provide a tactile alternative to traditional metronomes. VentureBeat described the device as a "wearable metronome that merges functionality with style."

=== Soundbrenner Core ===
Soundbrenner Core, launched in 2018, is a multi-functional device that combines a vibrating metronome, tuner, dB meter, and smartwatch features. The product was introduced through crowdfunding campaigns on Kickstarter and Indiegogo, raising over US$1 million in pre-orders. Designed specifically for musicians, the Core can be worn on the wrist, arm, ankle, thigh, shoulder, or chest, similar to the Pulse. Rolling Stone featured the Core as a versatile tool for musicians, noting its powerful vibrations and adaptability for different rhythms and time signatures. The device was also highlighted in Hodinkee for its role as a modern tool watch designed for musicians.

=== The Metronome by Soundbrenner ===
'The Metronome by Soundbrenner' is a multi-functional app available on iOS and Android, designed to support musicians in practice and performance. It offers features like a customizable metronome, practice tracking, and a tuner. The app has been reviewed over 100,000 times across both platforms, reflecting its widespread use among musicians worldwide. It was also recognized by Wired magazine as one of the best apps to learn music.

== Awards and recognitions ==
In 2016, Soundbrenner Pulse and Soundbrenner Metronome (wearable metronome smartwatch) won "Best in Show" award at the National Association of Music Merchants (NAMM), the largest annual trade show for the music products industry. The award recognized Soundbrenner Pulse for its innovative design and functionality as a wearable metronome.

In June 2020, Soundbrenner was featured by Wired magazine as one of the best musical apps and tools in the world.

== See also ==
- List of companies of Hong Kong
- Music technology (electronic and digital)
