= Alexander Schubert =

German composer

Alexander Schubert (born 13 July 1979) is a German composer. Much of his music is experimental, involving multimedia, improvisatory, and interactive elements. He draws upon free jazz, techno, and pop styles.

== Biography ==
Alexander Schubert was born in Bremen. He studied Bioinformatics in Leipzig, then spent a year at the Center for Art and Media Technology in Karlsruhe at the Institute of Music and Acoustics. He received a doctorate in multimedia composition at the Hochschule für Musik und Theater Hamburg, studying under Georg Hajdu and Manfred Stahnke. He teaches at the Musikhochschule Hamburg, directs the electronic studio at Musikhochschule Lübeck and has been a visiting lecturer at Darmstadt International Summer Courses. A founding member of ensembles Decoder, Trnn, Schubert-Kettlitz-Schwerdt, and Ember, he has also pursued an experimental pop music solo project under the name Sinebag.

Schubert's pieces have been performed at several international institutions, including Wien Modern, ICMC, SMC, Ultima Oslo Contemporary Music Festival, DLF Forum neuer Musik, IRCAM, ZKM Center for Art and Media Karlsruhe, Huddersfield Contemporary Music Festival, and Blurred Edges in Hamburg.

== Music ==
Jennifer Walshe, Matthew Shlomowitz and Zubin Kanga have situated Schubert within what Walshe terms "The New Discipline" of contemporary music, alongside such composers as James Saunders and François Sarhan. Shlomowitz writes,

The remit of New Music has moved on and broadened out in the twenty-first century. Composers such as Joanna Bailie, Michael Beil, Johannes Kreidler and Jennifer Walshe have created work that: engages popular and everyday culture; develops historical ideas from the visual arts (e.g. conceptualism); utilises technology to create new musical instruments; combines field recordings with music to form new relationships between music and the world; and establishes a music-led interdisciplinary practice with multimedia and theatricalised works. Whilst evidently connected to each of these trends, Alexander Schubert's work is a distinctive voice within this milieu.

Schubert's music makes extensive use of multimedia, including live video, internet-sourced content, lighting, and motion sensors. Praised by some commentators for its fusion of avant-garde and pop styles, immersive qualities, and distinctive engagement with the internet, Schubert's critics have found his work excessively confrontational or conceptual.

In 2024, Schubert releases the album Angel Death Traps in collaboration with Copenhagen-based contemporary music ensemble NEKO3.

== Accolades ==
In 2009, Schubert won the Bourges Residency Prize, and his piece Nachtschatten (Nightshade) placed in the Canadian Electroacoustic Community "Jeu de temps" competition. He won the European Conference of Promoters of New Music competition in 2012 and a Giga-Hertz Production Award in 2013. Wiki-Piano.Net received an honorary mention in the 2019 Prix Ars Electronica.

== Writings ==
Schubert has published articles on virtuality, post-digitality and multimedia composition. A collection of texts can be found in his book Switching Worlds.

== Compositions ==
=== Pieces with live electronics and visuals ===
- Coryllus Avellana (2007), for 49-channel tape, clarinet and electronics (named after Corylus avellana, common hazel)
- Bifurcation Fury (2012), for electric bass guitar, live electronics and lighting
- Lucky Dip (2013), for midi-drumkit, keyboard, and electric guitar
- Sensate Focus (2014), for electric guitar, bass clarinet, violin, percussion, live electronics and animated light
- HELLO (2014), for any number of instruments, live-electronics, and video
- Supramodal Parser (2015), four pieces for singer, electric guitar, saxophone, percussion, piano and electronics (with haze and lighting)
- Star Me Kitten (2015), for singer, flexible ensemble, video, and electronics
- SCANNERS (2013, rev. 2016), for string quintet, choreography and electronics
- f1 (2016), for variable group of musicians and video
- Codec Error (2017), for double bass, two percussionists, and lighting
- Asterism (2020), for dancers, live-electronics, and lighting
- Angel Death Traps (2024), for ensemble, live-electronics, and lighting

=== Interactive sensor pieces ===
- Laplace Tiger (2009), for drum kit, arm-sensor, live electronics and live video
- Weapon of Choice (2009), for violin, sensor, live electronics and live video
- Bureau Del Sol (2011), for drumkit, saxophone/piano/e-guitar/clarinet and timecode-vinyl
- Your Fox's A Dirty Gold (2011), for solo performer with voice, motion sensors, electric guitar and live electronics
- Point Ones (2012), for small ensemble and augmented conductor
- Serious Smile (2014), for sensor-equipped ensemble (piano, percussion, cello, conductor) and live electronics

=== Instrumental pieces with live electronics ===
- Sugar, Maths and Whips (2011), for violin, double bass, piano, drum kit, and electronics
- Bird Snapper (2012), for singer, saxophone, e-bass, e-guitar, percussion, and keyboard
- Grinder (2015), for saxophone, percussion, keyboard, e-guitar, and electronics
- Wavelet A (2017), for 4 electric guitars and electronics
- Black Out BRD (2017), for any combination of instruments

==== Superimpose cycle ====
- Superimpose I (2009), for jazz quartet and electronics
- Superimpose II – Night of the Living Dead (2009), for jazz quartet and electronics
- Superimpose III – Infinite Jest: (2010), for e-guitar, drum kit, saxophone, and live electronics

=== Community pieces ===
- Public Domain (2017), for one or more performers and/or electronics and/or video
- Silent Post (2018), for any number of instruments and/or electronics and/or video
- Black Out Software (2018), for any combination of instruments
- Wiki-Piano.Net (2018), for piano and internet
- Behind the Scenes (2019), for any combination of instruments

=== Tape pieces ===
- Nachtschatten (2008)
- Semaphores (2011)
- Mimicry (2015)
- The Password Disco (2017)

=== Installations ===
- A Set of Dots (2007), interactive audiovisual installation
- Some forgotten patterns (2009), audiovisual installation
- Unit Cycle (2013), audiovisual installation
- Solid State (2016), sound- and light-installation
- Black Mirror (2016), hour-long participatory concert installation
- Control (2018), 90-minute participatory concert installation
- A Perfect Circle (2019), participatory "therapy session" for audience, 2 speakers, 2 assistants, and supervisor
- Unity Switch (2019), interactive virtual performance installation

=== Video pieces ===
- It Was not an Easy Situation (2018), video and sound
- Acceptance (2018), documentary piece for solo performer

== Select discography ==
=== CD ===
- 2005: Milchwolken in Teein (Ahornfelder: AH01) as Sinebag.
- 2005: Près de la lisière (Ahornfelder: AH02) as Sinebag.
- 2006: Oullh d'baham (Euphorium: EUPH 010) with Urs Leimgruber, Christian Lillinger and Oliver Schwerdt.
- 2010: Aurona Arona (Creative Sources/Abhornfelder: AH18) with Urs Leimgruber, Christian Lillinger and Oliver Schwerdt.
- 2011: plays Sinebag (Ahornfelder: AH16, 2011).

=== DVD ===
- 2008: Live Scenes (Euphorium Films: EUPH 011) with Urs Leimgruber, Christian Lillinger and Oliver Schwerdt.
- 2011:Weapon of Choice (Ahornfelder: AH21).
