= Between Heaven and Earth (album) =

Studio album by Conrad Bauer, Peter Kowald, and Günter Sommer
- Released: 2003
- Recorded: November 30 and December 1, 2001
- Studios: Radio Studio DRS, Zürich
- Genre: Free jazz
- Length: 52:38
- Labels: Intakt; CD 079
- Producer: Intakt Records

Conrad Bauer chronology
| News from Berlin (2002) | Between Heaven and Earth (2003) | Hummelsummen (2003) |

Between Heaven and Earth is an album by trombonist Conrad Bauer, bassist Peter Kowald, and drummer Günter Sommer. It was recorded on November 30 and December 1, 2001, at Radio Studio DRS in Zürich, and was released in 2003 by Intakt Records.

This was the trio's final recording, as Kowald died unexpectedly in September 2002. Sommer reflected: "For thirty years, this friendship to Peter Kowald enriched my life... He did not only show me vast parts of the world, but through him I understood what keeps us moving, in the end, is the ability to do something with desire and love, to love something!"

== Reception ==
Professional ratings
Review scores
| Source | Rating |
|---|---|
| AllMusic | 4.5/5 stars |
| The Penguin Guide to Jazz | 4/4 stars |
| Tom Hull – on the Web | A− |

In a review for AllMusic, Steve Loewy stated that the album "captures the trio at its best, with intensely swirling layers of sound interlaced with innovative, creative improvisations." He concluded: "An important album for aesthetic and historic reasons, Between Heaven and Earth is a reminder of how compelling this trio could be."

The authors of The Penguin Guide to Jazz Recordings awarded the album a full 4 stars, and wrote: "Bauer is the dominant voice, but both Kowald and Sommer are so attuned to this idiom that one hears a group rather than individuals... a further poignant footnote to the magnificent career of Europe's most influential free-jazz bassist."

== Track listing ==
Composed by Conrad Bauer, Günter Sommer, and Peter Kowald.

1. "Being Born" – 3:30
2. "Wondering" – 6:36
3. "Waiting For" – 4:19
4. "Fighting" – 3:01
5. "Looking Out" – 4:02
6. "Travelling" – 3:15
7. "Loving" – 4:21
8. "Suffering" – 2:18
9. "Playing" – 7:04
10. "And Playing Again" – 10:27
11. "Travelling Again" – 3:08

== Personnel ==
- Conrad Bauer – trombone
- Peter Kowald – bass
- Günter Sommer – drums, percussion
