= Basem Darwisch =

Basem Darwisch باسم درويش
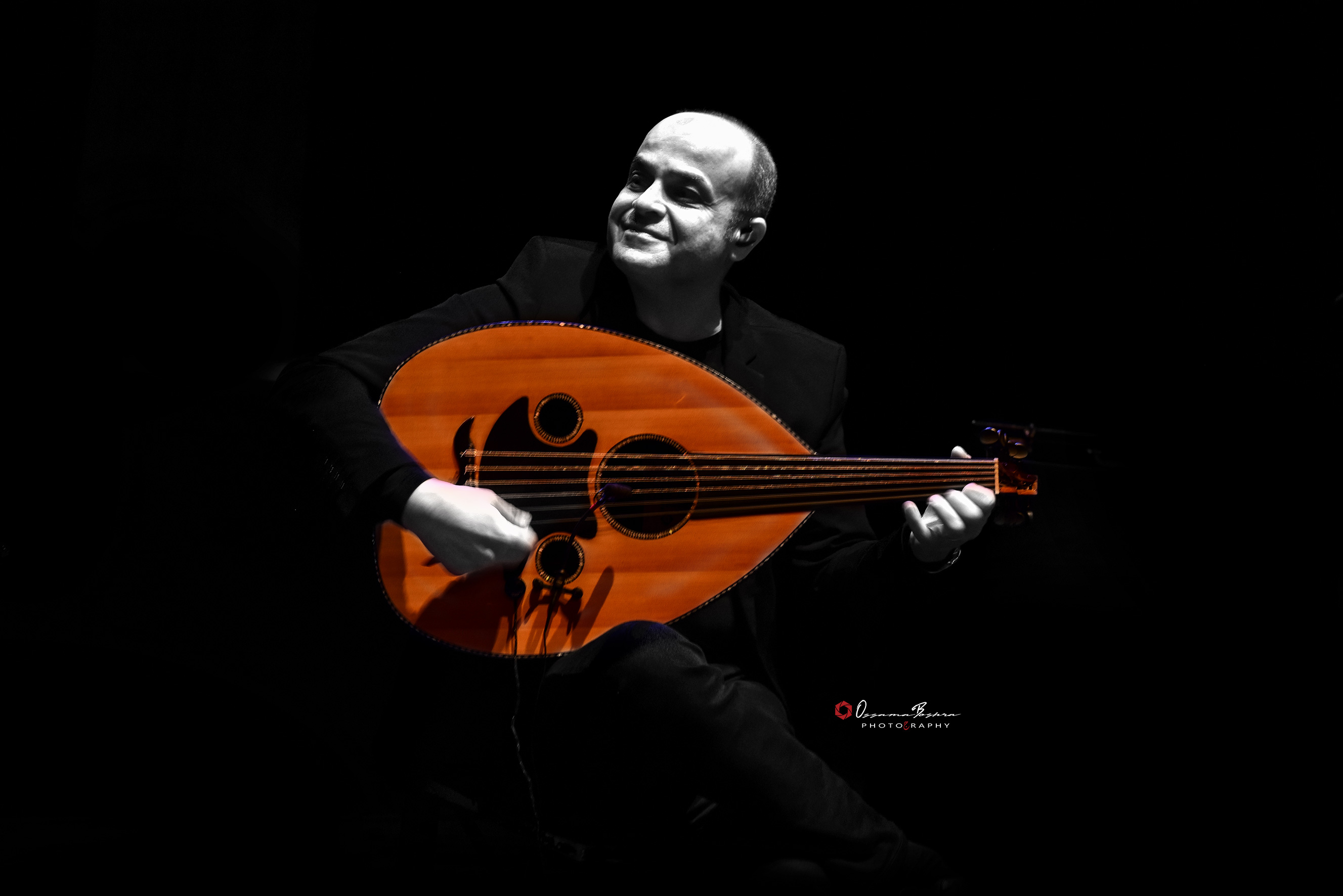
- Basem Darwisch

Background information
- Born: Basem Samir Darwish; April 1966 (age 60); Beni Mazar, Al-Minya, Egypt
- Genre: Jazz
- Occupations: Musician, composer, record producer
- Instrument: Oud
- Years active: 1984–present
- Member of: Cairo Steps

Basem Darwisch (Arabic: باسم درويش) (born April 1966) is an Egyptian–German composer, producer and oud virtuoso. He is the founder of Cairo Steps Ensemble, He is the first musician in the Middle East to be awarded the German golden jazz award in 2018 and 2021.

== Education ==
Darwisch studied German linguistics at Ain Shams University and classical music at the Arabic music academy in Cairo. He won prizes for Best Oud Player in 1985 and 1986.

By the end of 1986 he had moved to Austria and then Germany, where he studied Egyptology and ethnology at Heidelberg University.

== Career ==
Darwisch started his professional career in 1986 at the Theatre of AlTali'aa in Cairo with the Egyptian composer Waguih Aziz, In 1994 he joined the folklore group Salamat in Germany with Sudanese and Egyptian musicians. He played with Salamat for many years in France, Spain, England and Germany.

Darwisch joined many Afro Egyptian and Arabic groups in Europe between 1994 and 1997. Then in 1997 in Berlin with Hossam Shaker they founded new form of the Egyptian group Rahalah, with different concerts, workshops in Spain, Germany and Egypt.

In 1999, he joined Sharkiat band for Fathy Salama, Grammy award 2005 winner in concerts in Cairo opera house, El Qalaa Festival and Alexandria in Egypt. In 2000 Darwisch joined Mohamed Mounir Band and played with Mounir Concerts in Morocco, Berlin and other European cities.

In 2000, Darwisch formed with the German pianist Matthias Frey and former BAP Saxophonist Büdi Siebert an oriental jazz Trio with Concerts in Germany and Egypt.

== Discography ==
Bassem Darwisch led his team, Cairo Steps, to produce 5 albums and a large number of singles:

Albums and Singles
Year of Release	Album name	Content	Notes
2012	Oud Lounge	1. Cairo Steps*; 2. Memories; 3. Triomania; 4. Samai Darwisch; 5. Sun Rise; 6. Taqsim Oud; 7. Alpha Omega; 8. Desert Road; 9. Min Awel Lamsa	*Cairo Steps was redistributed in another version and released on the same album
2016	Arabiskan	1. Sultan; 2. Nubian Groove; 3. Shams; 4. Amber; 5. Siwa**; 6. Bokra; 7. Alif; 8. La Sua Bucca; 9. Arabiskan*	*Ali El Helbawy sang Arabiskan in Flying Carpet album; **The song (My God) was sung by Marwa Nagy with Siwa Music.
2016	Silk Road	1. Voyage Oriental; 2. Jaipur Express; 3. Constantinople Dance Palace; 4. Floating On Syr Darya; 5. Riders Of Tashkent; 6. Feathers and flames 7. Samarkand 1001; 8. The Prince Of Turfan; 9. Taklan Makan; 10. Moon Over Issyk kul 11. Market Of Kashgar	
2017	Flying Carpet	1. Sansibar; 2. Khaliji Steps; 3. Shams; 4. Dance Du Nil; 5. Arabiskan	
	Electronic Music (With: Sam Shure)	1. Iboto; 2. Mirage; 3. Sultan; 4. Arabiskan	
	Soundtrack	Seven to One	
	Inspirational Music	Oud Mood of the day	
	Inspirational Music	Duduk and Oud dialog mood	With Ragheed William
2014	Singles	Gnossienne No.1	Remix feat Sheikh Ehab Younis
2014 - 2015	Singles	Je nai nan	feat Sheikh Ehab Younis, Ali El Helbawy, Monica George and Peter Ghattas.
2014	Singles	I can Say	feat Maher Fayez.
2015	Singles	Aripsalin	feat Monica George and Peter Ghattas.
2015	Singles	Mariam	feat Monica George and Peter Ghattas.
2015	Singles	Beredak	Remix feat Marwa Nagy
2015	Singles	Al Mokhtar	Remix feat Marwa Nagy
2015	Singles	Gnossienne	New Remix
2017	Singles	Palladio	New Remix
2017	Singles	Adagio	Remix feat Sheikh Ehab Younis
2020	Singles	Malek ElMolk	feat Sheikh Ehab Younis

== Awards ==
On 19 April 2018, Cairo Steps Founder Basem Darwisch collected The German Jazz Music award at Berlin ceremony with the ensemble members including Inas Abdeldayem, Minister of Culture of Egypt, The ensemble received the award for their album Flying Carpet, which they created with German band Quadro Nuevo.

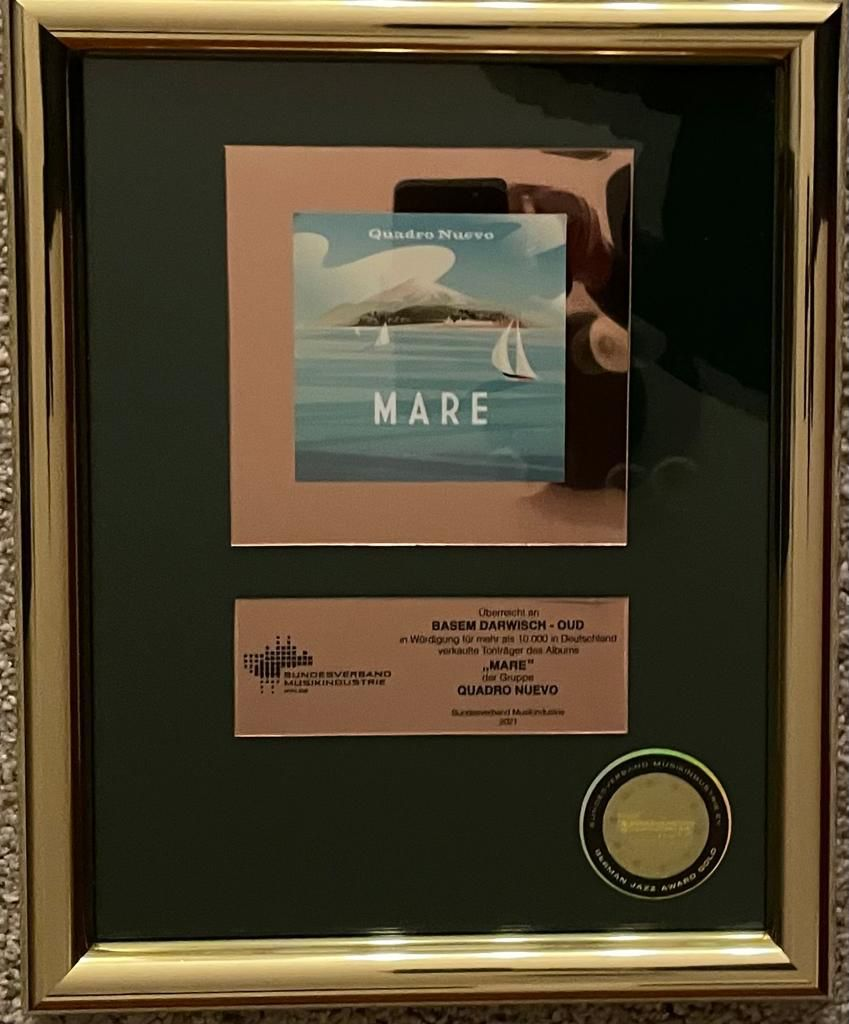
German Jazz Award 2021 awarded to Darwisch with Quadro Nuevo

On 12 October 2021, Basem Darwisch collected The German Jazz Music award with Quadro Nuevo for his track "Cafe Groppi" in their album "MARE".
