= Basem =

Basem (Arabic: باسم) is an Arabic male given name. Notable people with this name include:

- Basem Al-Montashari (born 1990), Saudi Arabian football player
- Basem Al-Sherif (born 1984), Saudi football player
- Basem Ali (born 1988), Egyptian football player
- Basem Atallah (born 1989), Saudi Arabian football player
- Basem Darwisch (born 1966), Egyptian–German composer, producer and oud virtuoso
- Basem Eid (born 1990), Egyptian football player
- Basem Eltahhan (born 1982), Egyptian snooker player
- Basem Fathi (born 1982), Jordanian football player
- Basem Khandakji (born 1983), Palestinian journalist and prisoner
- Basem Morsy (born 1992), Egyptian football player
- Basem Naim (born 1963), Palestinian politician
