= Christian Lillinger =

German musician (b. 1984)

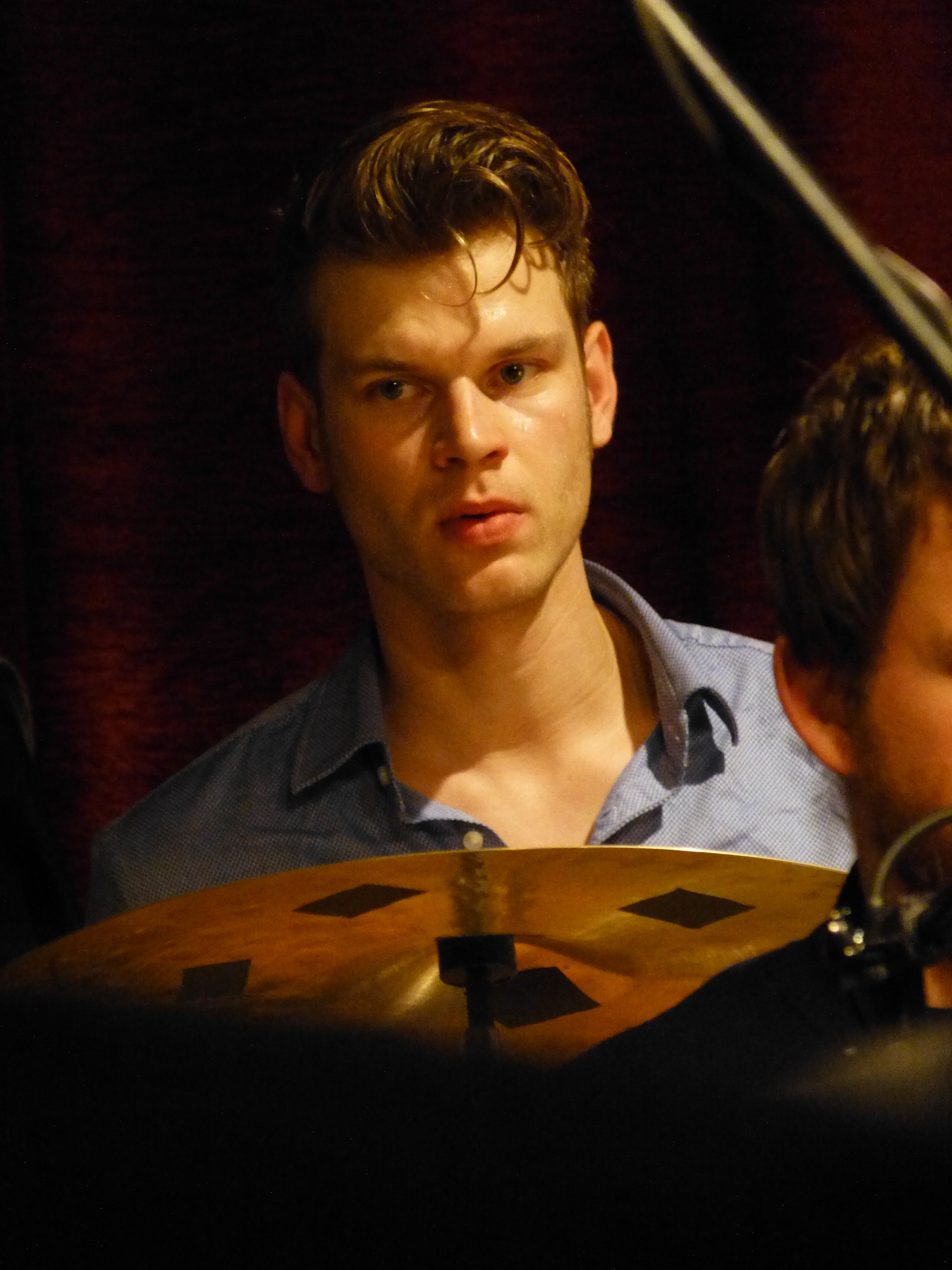

Christian Lillinger (born 21 April 1984) is a German drummer, composer and percussionist. He was born in Lübben, grew up in the German village of Kuschkow, and has been living in Berlin since 2003 working as a musician and composer. Christian has performed in concerts and at festivals in Europe, Asia, Africa, South America and the US. He has played with Joachim Kühn, Ernst-Ludwig Petrowsky, Beat Furrer, Miroslav Vitouš, Dave Liebman, Wadada Leo Smith, William Parker, Evan Parker, Louis Sclavis, Joe Lovano, Peter Brötzmann and Tony Malaby.

== History ==
Christian Lillinger studied with Günter Sommer at Hochschule für Musik Carl Maria von Weber in Dresden from 2000 to 2004. In 2000, he won the International Improvisation Contest in Leipzig. From 2001 to 2003, he was a member of the Bundesjazzorchester (BuJazzO), the German federal youth jazz orchestra.

Since 2004 he has constantly contributing to projects of the EUPHORIUM_freakestra, particularly working in trios and quintets with Ernst-Ludwig Petrowsky. Joining Oliver Schwerdt (alias Elan Pauer) his corporate recording of the late work of the German free jazz saxophonist and clarinetist coming along with the albums Tumult!, Krawall!, Rabatz! released on EUPHORIUM Records attracted vast attention.

In 2008, Lillinger formed the band Grund. Their first release, First Reason was released in September 2009 with Second Reason, the second release, following in 2013. Both appeared on Clean Feed. The third album Grund was released on Pirouet Records in 2015. The latest album COR was released in 2018 on his own Plaist label. It was among the best reviewed albums of Downbeat Magazine in 2018.

In 2014, he co-founded the band Amok Amor with Peter Evans, Petter Eldh and Wanja Slavin. Amok Amor released their self-titled debut in 2015 on Boomslang Records. In 2017 they followed up with We know not what we do, which was released on Intakt Records. In April 2017 Amok Amor played at the Cheltenham Festival, which was broadcast on BBC.

Between August 2016 and March 2017, Lillinger was a scholar of the Bartels Fondation in Basel. In 2016, the German TV Network 3sat produced a documentary about his life and musical passion. In 2017, he founded his music label Plaist-Music. In the same year Christian was awarded the SWR Jazzpreis 2017. He plays in the trio Punkt.Vrt.Plastik with Swedish bassist Petter Eldh and Slovenian pianist Kaja Draksler, with whom he released a self titled album in 2018, which was released on Intakt Records.

== Honors ==
2017: SWR-Jazzpreis 2017

== Discography ==
- Christian Lillingers Grund First Reason (Clean Feed, 2009) with Tobias Delius, Wanja Slavin, Robert Landfermann, Jonas Westergaard and Joachim Kühn
- Tumult! (Euphorium Records, 2015) with New Old Luten Quintet featuring Ernst-Ludwig Petrowsky, Elan Pauer, Robert Landfermann and John Edwards
- Karacho! (Euphorium Records, 2017) with Big Bad Brötzmann Quintet featuring Peter Brötzmann, Oliver Schwerdt, John Edwards and John Eckhardt
- Open Form for Society (Plaist, 2019) with Antonis Anissegos, Kaja Draksler, Elias Stemeseder, Lucy Railton, Robert Landfermann, Petter Eldh, Christopher Dell and Roland Neffe
