= Ruth Hohmann =

German jazz singer (born 1931)

- Born: 19 August 1931 (age 95); Eisenach, Thuringia, Germany
- Genres: Jazz; Swing; Dixieland; blues
- Occupations: Singer; music educator
- Years active: 1961–2010s

Ruth Hohmann (born 19 August 1931) is a German jazz singer and university lecturer. She was known as the "First Lady of East German Jazz" and was for a long time East Germany's only jazz singer of note, playing a major role in the dissemination of the music in the country.

== Biography ==
Born in Eisenach, Thuringia, Germany, Ruth Hohmann (her stage name) as a child took singing and ballet lessons and sang in the school choir. In 1949, she went to acting school in Erfurt. Two years later, she married the theater and film critic Heinz Hofmann and moved to Berlin. When their two children were old enough, she began performing publicly. On 12 November 1961, she made her first appearance as a jazz singer, singing English lyrics, and thereafter made constant appearances at home and abroad with her band the Jazz Optimisten Berlin, until the mid-1960s, when her career stalled because of the ruling politburo's cultural policies.

Walter Ulbricht, East Germany's hardline communist ruler between 1949 and 1971, clamped down on anything he felt had links with American imperialism, and while jazz was not officially banned, Hohmann has recalled that "we stopped getting bookings. Concerts would be cancelled at the last minute, with promoters giving excuses like 'we haven't got a sound technician'." It was only after Erich Honecker took over as leader of the GDR in 1971 that she was able to resume her performances. From 1976 to 1996, she was a lecturer at Berlin's Hanns Eisler Academy of Music for vocal training.

She was featured in the television documentary series Lebensläufe, in a 1999 episode entitled "Ruth Hohmann – Ein Leben für den Jazz", and also appeared in the 2005 film NVA.

In 2011, "Ruth Hohmann, Germany's oldest active jazz singer renders 'The Entertainer' in an amazing range of different voices and registers, now straight-faced, now clowning around."

== Style ==
She sings mainly jazz standards, such as "Sweet Georgia Brown" and "Makin' Whoopee", in a style that can be characterised as favouring swing, New Orleans jazz and blues, frequently using scat singing, for which she has been dubbed the "Ella Fitzgerald of the East".
