= Conny Bauer =

German free jazz trombonist

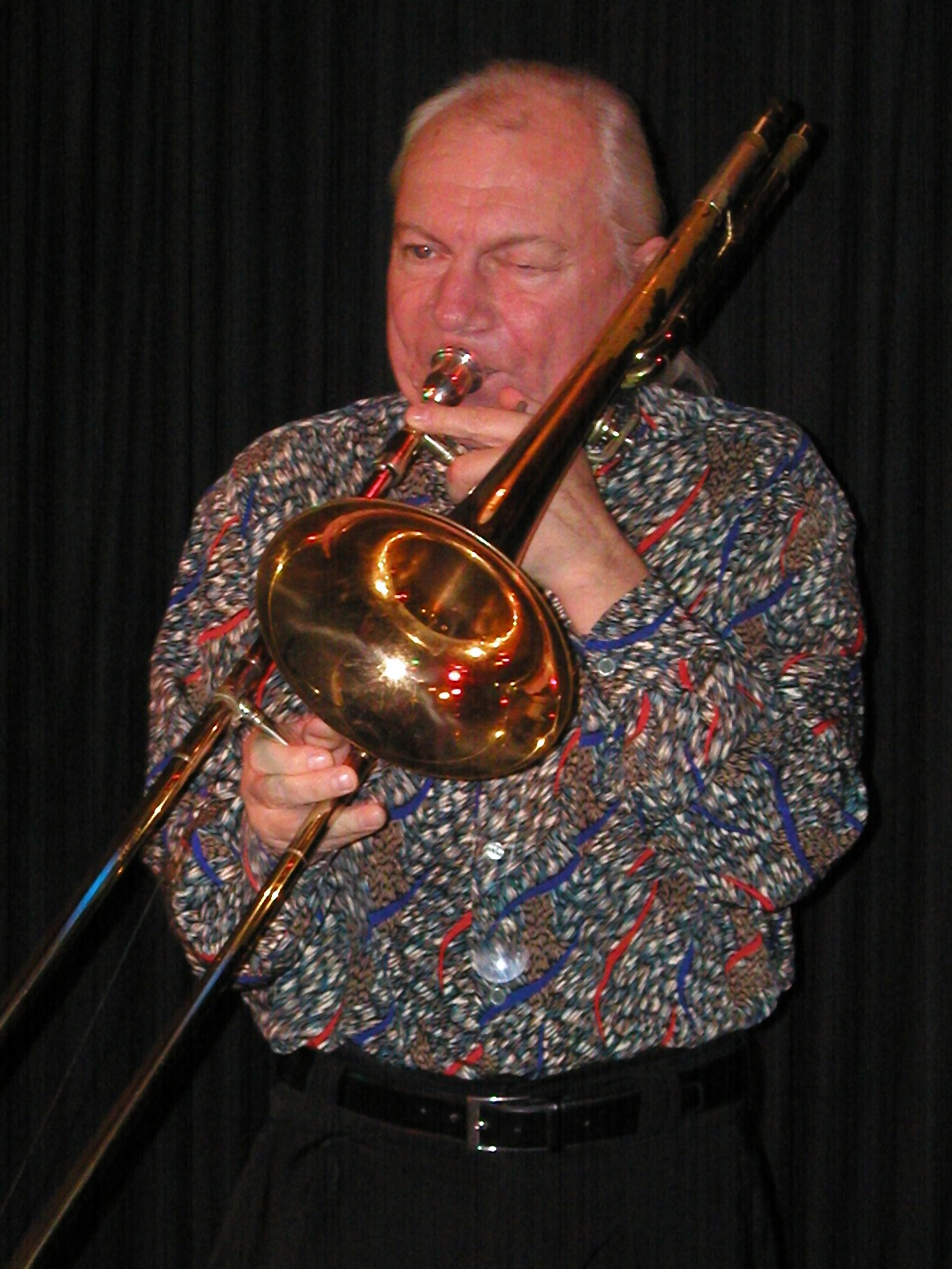

Background information
- Born: Konrad Bauer; 4 July 1943 (age 82); Halle, Saxony-Anhalt, Germany
- Genres: Jazz
- Occupation: Trombonist
- Instrument: Trombone

Konrad "Conny" Bauer (born 4 July 1943) is a German free jazz trombonist. He is the brother of the trombonist Johannes Bauer.

As a student at senior high school in Sonneberg between 1957 and 1961, he was enthusiastic about modern music and dance genres such as swing, boogie-woogie, blues and rock 'n' roll, and taught himself to play guitar and piano. After leaving school with A-levels, he tried to play his music in several bands and was nicknamed "Conny" by his friends.

After recognizing that he did not know enough about music to become a professional musician, Bauer studied modern dance music from 1964 to 1968 at the Carl Maria von Weber-Music school Conservatory in Dresden. Because too many students wanted to study guitar, he entered the trombone class, having had some experience of playing the instrument. In 1968 he left the conservatory for Berlin to improve his skills with private lessons. From 1969 until 1971 he started his career as guitarist and singer in the band of Ernst-Ludwig Petrowsky. He also began a career as a trombone soloist in 1970.

During the second half of the 1970s Bauer became a prominent jazz player in European free jazz. He helped found numerous groups which influenced the development of jazz in East Germany: these included FEZ and its successive quartet and trio formations, the Doppelmoppel quartet, and Synopsis/Zentralquartett with Ernst-Ludwig Petrowsky, Ulrich Gumpert and Günter "Baby" Sommer. He was featured in a profile on composer Graham Collier in the 1985 Channel 4 documentary 'Hoarded Dreams'. In 1986 he toured Japan for several weeks, encountering numerous Japanese musicians. From 1988 to 1989 he directed the National Jazz Orchestra of the former East Germany. Since 1983 he has worked with artists such as Tadashi Endo, Sheryl Banks, Tony Oxley, Derek Bailey, Maggie Nicols, Theo Jörgensmann, Peter Brötzmann, Barre Phillips, Peter Kowald, Han Bennink, Barry Altschul, Jay Oliver, Louis Moholo, Gerry Hemingway, and George E. Lewis.

In 2004 Bauer was awarded the German SWR jazz prize especially for his solo recordings Hummelsummen. As unaccompanied soloist Bauer uses multiphonics, with matchless "circular breathing techniques" he conjures his own loops.

== Discography ==
- Just for fun, FMP 0140 LP (1973)
- Synopsis, Amiga 855395 LP (1974)
- Auf der Elbe schwimmt ein rosa Krokodil, FMP 0240 LP (1974)
- FEZ, Amiga 855585 LP (1977)
- Was ist denn nun?, Konrad Bauer Trio, FMP 0780 LP (1979)
- Secret Points, Conny Bauer & Gianluigi Trovesi, Dragon DRLP 21 LP (1979)
- Konrad Bauer Solo, Amiga 855783 LP (1980)
- Round about Mittweida, Konrad Bauer Quartet, FMP 0980 LP (1982)
- Flüchtiges Glück, Konrad Bauer Solo, Riskant 4017 LP (1984) / EFA-CD 15713
- Reflections, Doppelmoppel, FMP CD 74 (1986)
- Jazzorchester der DDR, directed by Konrad Bauer, Amiga 856455 LP (1987)
- Live im Völkerschlachtdenkmal, Konrad Bauer Solo, Amiga 856439 LP (1988)
- Zentralquartett, ZOOM 2170 019 ADD (1990)
- Toronto Töne, Konrad Bauer Solo, Victo CD 017 (1991)
- Three Wheels – Four Directions, Konrad Bauer Trio, Victo CD 023 (1992)
- Plié, Zentralquartett, Intakt CD 037 (1994)
- Bauer – Bauer, Intakt CD 040 (1995)
- Generations from (East) Germany, Conny Bauer with Joachim Kühn, Klangräume, LC 6035 (1995)
- Careless Love, Zentralquartett, Intakt CD 050 (1998)
- Aventure Québécoise, Doppelmoppel, Victo CD 065 (1999)
- Alice im Wunderland, Walfriede Schmitt with Konrad Bauer, Eulenspiegel Verlag (2000)
- News from Berlin, Aki Takase, Konrad Bauer, Victo CD 081 (2002)
- Between Heaven and Earth, Conrad Bauer, Peter Kowald, Günter Sommer, Intakt CD 079 (2003)
- Hummelsummen, Conrad Bauer (solo), Intakt CD 085 (2003)

With Graham Collier

- Hoarded Dreams (Cuneiform, 1983 [2007])

With Barry Guy and the London Jazz Composers' Orchestra with Irène Schweizer

- Radio Rondo/Schaffhausen Concert (Intakt, 2009)

== See also ==
- Jazz in Germany
