= Zubin Kanga =

Australian pianist

Zubin Kanga (born 1982) is an Australian-born pianist, composer, and musicologist based in London. He specialises in contemporary and experimental music. He has been a member of Ensemble Offspring since 2005. He is currently a research fellow at Royal Holloway, University of London, where his research concerns the collaborative process between composer and performer, as well as technological interactions in new music.

== Early life and education ==
The son of Rustom Kanga and Marlene Kanga who are both engineers, Kanga was born in Sydney and attended Sydney Grammar School until 2000. He graduated from the University of Sydney in 2006 before moving to London in 2007, where he is still resident. Kanga studied under Rolf Hind and attended the Royal Academy of Music, receiving an MMus in 2009 and a PhD in 2014.

== Career ==
Kanga has been an active chamber musician since joining Australian contemporary music group Ensemble Offspring in 2005 at the age of 22, of which he remains a member. He played with the Marsyas Trio between 2017 and 2018, during which time they recorded In the Theatre of Air, an album of music by women composers for piano, flute, and cello. It reached #7 in the Specialist Classical Charts and was named on Sequenza21's "Best Chamber Music CDs of 2018".

Notable solo performances of Kanga's include Beat Furrer's concerto for two pianos Nuun with Rolf Hind and the London Sinfonietta at the Queen Elizabeth Hall in January 2011 and Thomas Adès's Concerto Conciso at the Elisabeth Murdoch Hall in Melbourne in 2013, when he also appeared alongside the composer in a two-piano arrangement of Conlon Nancarrow's Studies Nos. 6 and 7. Kanga frequently commissions pieces that combine the piano with electronics and interactive media, including Patrick Nunn's Morphosis for piano, motion sensors and live electronics (premiered at Cheltenham Music Festival), Laura Bowler's SHOW(ti)ME for speaking pianist, MiMU gloves, live video and live electronics (premiered at Huddersfield Contemporary Music Festival) and Luke Nickel's hhiiddeenn vvoorrttiicceess for piano, five Soundbrenner haptic metronomes, video and electronics (premiered at Submerge Festival, Manchester). His own compositional output has included Dead Leaves, which he premiered on ABC Classic radio in 2017, and was selected to represent Australia at the 2018 International Rostrum of Composers.

Kanga appeared at Huddersfield Contemporary Music Festival in 2018 with his programme Wikipiano, named after a commissioned piece by Alexander Schubert, WIKI-PIANO.NET. The score is derived from a web page which members of the public can edit by adding text, directions, notation, images, and YouTube videos. In the same year, Kanga premiered Brett Dean's Rooms of Elsinore at the Extended Play new music marathon alongside his own composition Spider Web Castle. Kanga has performed several times at London Contemporary Music Festival, premiering Michael Finnissy's Hammerklavier – Part 1 and Alwynne Pritchard's Heart of Glass, as well as performing his realisation of Julius Eastman's Gay Guerrilla at London Contemporary Music Festival alongside Hind, Siwan Rhys, and Eliza McCarthy, which was later featured (uncredited) in video installation The Third Part of the Third Measure.

Kanga has received international critical acclaim since being awarded "Best Newcomer" in the 2010 ABC Limelight Awards. His Melbourne Festival performance of John Cage's Sonatas and Interludes was described in The Age as "a blaze of retrospective creative brilliance", while his 2019 Australian tour Piano Ex Machina was described by Limelight magazine as "a rewarding experience, rich in possibility, infused with curiosity and playfulness, and not afraid to explore conceptual and expressive horizons well beyond the boundaries of a traditional piano recital". He premiered a major new piano and multimedia work by Philip Venables, Answer Machine Tape, 1987 in 2022, exploring the life of New York artist David Wojnarowicz using a KeyScanner by the Augmented Instruments Laboratory to allow the piano to type text live onto the screen. He toured it to Time of Music Festival, November Music, and Huddersfield Contemporary Music Festival.

He appears as an extra alongside Ben Whishaw in Mark Bradshaw's short film O Holy Ghost (2019).

=== Research ===
Kanga's research concerns the collaborative process between composer and performer, as well as technological interactions in new music. From 2014 to 2015, he was a postdoctoral researcher at The University of Nice Sophia Antipolis as part of the GEMME (Music and Gesture) project in partnership with IRCAM. He was made an Honorary Research Fellow of the Royal Academy of Music in 2014, an Institute of Musical Research Early Career Associate from 2014 to 2015, and an Honorary Research Associate of Sydney Conservatorium of Music, University of Sydney in 2017. He is currently a research fellow at Royal Holloway, University of London, being awarded a Leverhulme Research Fellowship in 2017 and a UK Research and Innovation Future Leaders Fellowship in 2020.

== Select discography ==
- 2014: Not Music Yet (HHCD06140743, Hospital Hill).
- 2015: Orfordness: Music by David Gorton (MSV 28550 Divine Art Records).
- 2015: Piano Inside Out (MD 3391, Move).
- 2015: Chiaroscuro: modern works for soprano and piano (PR0003 Phosphor Records) with Jane Sheldon.
- 2016: Patrick Nunn: Morphosis (RSR003CD, Red Sock Records).
- 2018: In the Theatre of Air (NMC D248, NMC Recordings) with the Marsyas Trio.

== Awards ==
=== AIR Awards ===
The Australian Independent Record Awards (commonly known informally as AIR Awards) is an annual awards night to recognise, promote and celebrate the success of Australia's Independent Music sector.

Year	Nominee / work	Award	Result
2015	Piano Inside Out	Best Independent Classical Album	Nominated

== Publications ==
- Kanga, Zubin. "Through the Screen: The Collaborative Creation of Works for Piano and Video", Contemporary Music Review, Vol 35, No. 4, 2016: 423–449.
- Kanga, Zubin and Alexander Schubert. "Gesture, Technology and the New Discipline: Conversations with Alexander Schubert", Contemporary Music Review, Vol 35, No. 4, 2016: 375–378.
- Kanga, Zubin. '"Building an instrument" in the collaborative composition and performance of works for piano and live electronics', in Perspectives on Artistic Research, ed. Robert Burke and Andrys Osman (Washington DC: Lexington, 2016).
- Gorton, David and Zubin Kanga. "Risky Business: negotiating virtuosity in the collaborative creation of Orfordness for solo piano" in Music and/as Process, ed. Lauren Redhead and Vanessa Hawes (Cambridge:Cambridge Scholars, 2016).
- Callis, Sarah, Neil Heyde, Zubin Kanga and Olivia Sham. "Creative Resistance as a Performative Tool", Music and Practice, vol. 2, 2015.
- Kanga, Zubin. "Not Music Yet: Graphic Notation as a Catalyst for Collaborative Metamorphosis", Eras Journal, vol. 16, no.1, 2014: 37–58.
- Ratcliffe, Robert, Jon Weinel and Zubin Kanga: "Mutations (megamix): Exploring Notions of the 'DJ set', 'Mashup' and 'Remix' through Live Piano-based Performance", eContact!, Canadian Electroacoustic Community, 2011.
