= Albert Mangelsdorff Prize =

German award for jazz music

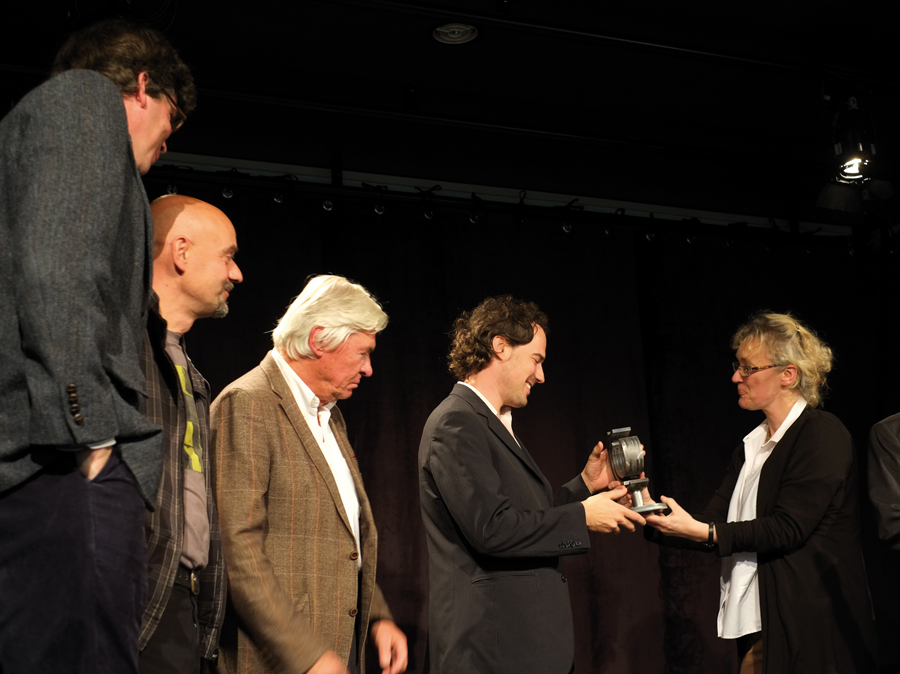
The award ceremony 2013: Nils Wogram (center) and the chairwoman of the Union Deutscher Jazzmusiker, pianist Julia Hülsmann (right)

The Deutsche Jazzpreis, also known as the Albert Mangelsdorff-Preis, is, together with the Hans Koller Preis, the most important jazz award in the German-speaking region. Since 1994, it has been awarded every two years by the Union Deutscher Jazzmusiker.

Named after Albert Mangelsdorff, the European jazz scene's best-known trombonist, it is endowed with 15,000 Euro by the GEMA foundation.

The Deutsche Jazzpreis was awarded for the eleventh time at the JazzFest Berlin '09.

== Recipients ==
- 1994 Alexander von Schlippenbach
- 1995 Peter Kowald
- 1997 Ernst-Ludwig Petrowsky
- 1999 Heinz Sauer
- 2001 Wolfgang Schlüter
- 2003 Ulrike Haage
- 2005 Ulrich Gumpert
- 2007 Gunter Hampel
- 2009 Eberhard Weber
- 2011 Peter Brötzmann
- 2013 Nils Wogram
- 2015 Achim Kaufmann
- 2017 Angelika Niescier
- 2019 Paul Lovens
- 2021 Aki Takase
- 2023 Conny Bauer
- 2025 Lauren Newton
