= Humans Only =

Humans

Studio album by Earthstar
- Released: 1982
- Recorded: 1981
- Genre: New age, electronic, ambient, krautrock
- Length: 44:51
- Label: Sky

Earthstar chronology
Atomkraft? Nein, Danke! (1981)	Humans (1982)	Axiom

Humans Only is the fourth full-length album (1982) by the American electronic band Earthstar. It was their third and final release for Hamburg-based Sky Records (in Germany).

Humans Only was result of a partnership between Earthstar founder Craig Wuest and Utica, New York-based guitarist and songwriter Dan Hapanowicz (credited as Daniel Happ), who replaced longtime guitarist Dennis Rea on this album. Humans Only presented a far more conventional, softer, more guitar-oriented sound than previous releases. It is also the last album on which the Birotron, the rarest of tape loop keyboard instruments, was played by Wuest. The two tracks with "funk" in the title aren't really funk at all, but they do reveal a more playful side to Earthstar's mainly electronic music.

The track "Indian Dances" is a shorter, somewhat pared-down version of a song from the Sleeper the Nightlifer sessions, which featured original drummer/vibraphonist and contributing composer Daniel Zongrone. That album remained unreleased until 2023, when Made in Germany Music reissued both Humans Only and Sleeper the Nightlifer as part of the 5-CD set Collected Works.

== Track listing ==
1. "Rainbow Dome" – 5:48
2. "Don't You Ever Wonder?" – 4:50
3. "Indian Dances" – 8:04
4. "One Flew Over the Ridge" – 5:28
5. "TV Funk" – 7:38
6. "Tip Toe Funk" – 13:20
  a. "Umbrey Flowing Lights"
  b. "25 Arrival Pieces"

== Personnel ==
- Craig Wuest - Synthesizers, mellotron, Birotron, Celeste, chimes, industrial box, horn keys, percussion, composer, producer, engineer, mixed by
- Daniel Happ - Acoustic guitar, electric guitar, bells, chimes, percussion, composer, producer, engineer, mixed by
- Andy Retscher - Bass guitar, synth bass, Birotron, engineer, mixed by
- Bob Mishalanie - Drum kit
- Tim Finnegan - Sounds, wood blocks
- Meredith Salisbury - Vocals
- Mark Rowe - Sax
- Daniel Zongrone - Drums, vibraphone
- Melanie Coiro - Bells
- Kathy Fusco - Flute
- John Leogrande - Congas
- Mark Magnet Kimsinger - Rattle, voices
- Anne Hacker - Flute
- John Bunkfeldt - Engineer, mixed by
- Bob Yeager - Engineer, mixed by

In addition, a nine piece string section appeared on the album.
