= Craig Wuest =

American keyboardist

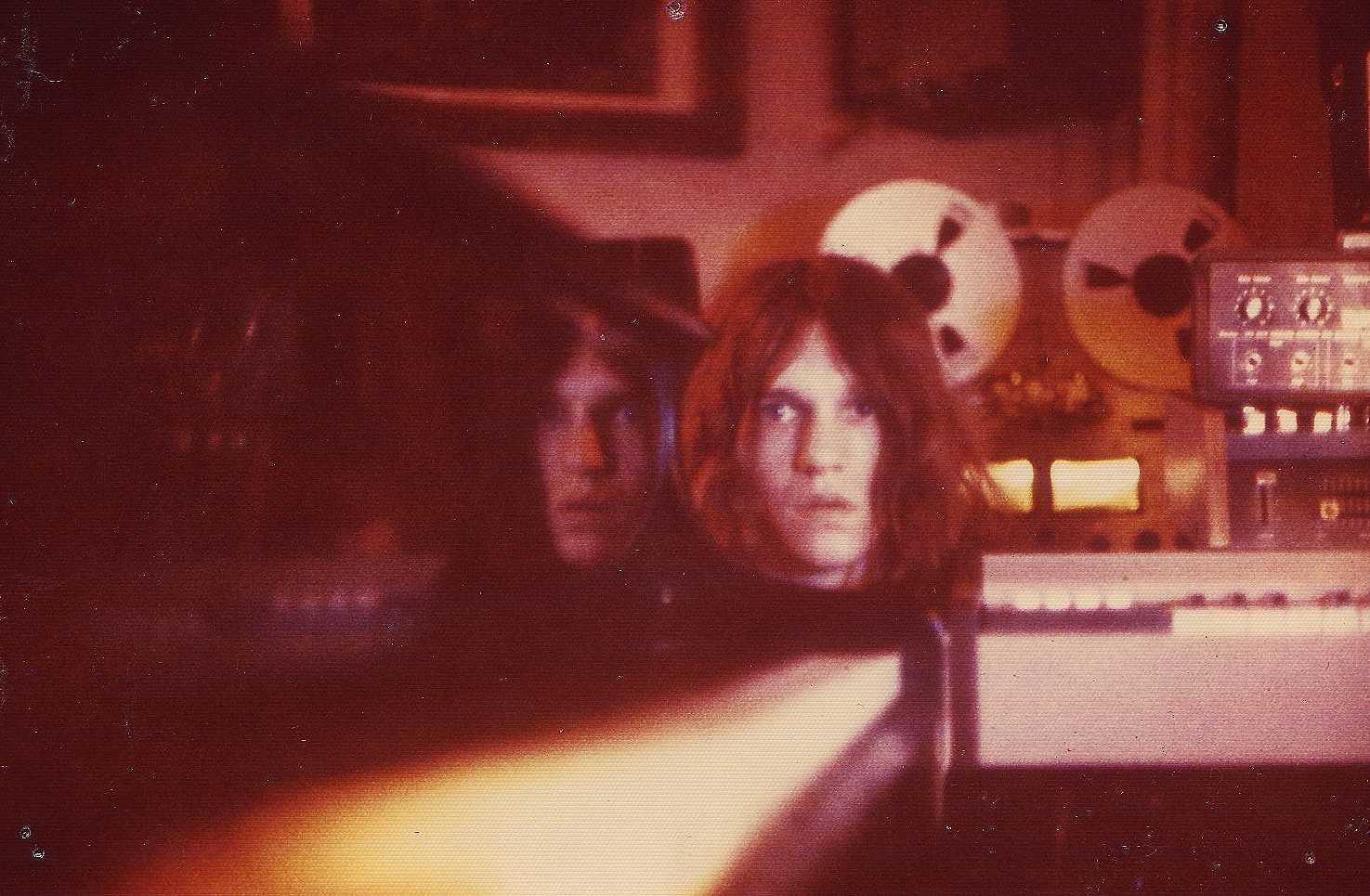
- Craig Wuest of Earthstar in 1977

Background information
- Origin: Utica, New York, United States
- Genres: Electronic, ambient, new-age, Kosmische Musik, art rock
- Occupations: musician, Producer
- Instruments: Synthesizer; Keyboards
- Years active: 1977–1984
- Labels: Sky; Moontower Records
- Formerly of: Earthstar

Craig Wuest is an American keyboardist currently based in Atlanta, Georgia. He is best known as the founder and leader of the electronic music group Earthstar during the 1970s and 1980s. Earthstar was the only American band who participated in Germany's Kosmische Musik/electronic music scene while still at its height.

== Early career ==
Wuest is originally from Utica, New York. According to former Earthstar guitarist Dennis Rea in the early 1970s Wuest was among the first musicians in Utica who owned a synthesizer. Wuest was heavily influenced by the German electronic music scene of the 1970s, including Klaus Schulze, Popol Vuh, Harmonia, Tangerine Dream, and Kraftwerk. Around the same time Rea had founded what he describes as an "eccentric progressive rock band," Zuir. According to Rea, "...being the only two adventurous music acts in town, collaboration between Craig and the members of Zuir was inevitable." Earthstar was born out of the partnership of Wuest, Rea, and other Utica-area musicians. In 1977 Earthstar was signed by Nashville-based Moontower Records, who released the group's first album, Salterbarty Tales, the following year.

== Earthstar in Germany ==
Craig Wuest was an admirer of electronic music pioneer Klaus Schulze, with whom he struck up a correspondence. Schulze encouraged Wuest and Earthstar to come to Germany, intending to sign them to his Innovative Communications record label. Wuest sold his grand piano, which had played a prominent part on Salterbarty Tales, to finance the move. Other Earthstar musicians joined Wuest in Germany to work on French Skyline, the group's second album, While much of French Skyline was recorded at Klaus Schulze studios in Hambühren, West Germany, Schulze's label never signed Earthstar. The group was instead signed by Hamburg-based Sky Records.

The group recorded four albums primarily in Germany and France for Sky: French Skyline (1979), Atomkraft? Nein, Danke! (1981), Humans Only (1982), and Sleeper, the Nightlifer, which was never released. The New Gibraltar Encyclopedia of Progressive Rock credits Wuest as being the mastermind behind Earthstar's sound and comments on French Skyline and Atomkraft? Nein, Danke!: "Wuest's vision propels these two albums, his desire apparently is to create music that doesn't necessarily suggest a particular instrument, rather creates a new texture." Wuest co-produced French Skyline with Klaus Schulze and served as producer for the other Earthstar albums recorded during this period.

Wuest is also notable for his heavy use of the mellotron and the Birotron, a very rare tape loop instrument which could sustain notes beyond eight seconds.Some of Craig's friends like Pete Hyrnio, Carl Goodhines and John Castello were local musicians who also used it from time to time. Wuest was the only keyboardist at the time other than Rick Wakeman who recorded albums on which he played the Birotron.

== Later works ==
After returning to the United States Wuest continued to compose, play, and record electronic music. A now defunct earthstarmusic.com Web site listed later releases; one in particular, Axiom, which was listed as following Humans Only, had clearly been recorded and MP3 samples of the music were included on the Web site. They revealed a conventional, melodic, controlled electronic music sound. It is likely that by this point Earthstar had become Wuest's solo project. However, no record of the release of Axiom or any other later works can be found.

== Discography ==
=== In Earthstar ===
- 1978 Salterbarty Tales (studio album)
- 1979 French Skyline (studio album)
- 1981 Atomkraft? Nein, Danke! (studio album)
- 1982 Humans Only (studio album)
