= Norm Peach =

American bassist from Utica, New York

Norm Peach is an American bassist from Utica, New York who was a member of Earthstar during the late 1970s. He also played with Dennis Rea and Daniel Zongrone in Zuir prior to joining Earthstar. He appeared on two Earthstar albums: Salterbarty Tales (1978) and French Skyline (1979).
