= Land (band) =

- Origin: Seattle, Washington, United States
- Genres: Jazz rock folk rock Rock; Electronic rock
- Years active: 1993–2001
- Labels: Extreme; Periplum; First World Music
- Past members: Jeff Greinke; Lesli Dalaba; Dennis Rea; Bill Rieflin; Fred Chalenor; Greg Gilmore; Bill Moyer; Ed Pias; George Soler
- Website: www.dennisrea.com

Land (styled LAND) was a Seattle based music group founded and led by Jeff Greinke. Their music is described by guitarist Dennis Rea as "an odd blend of jazz, rock, electronic, and world music." Land was active from 1993 until 2001 and released three albums. In 1996 they toured China, Hong Kong, and Macau, including a performance at the prestigious Beijing International Jazz Festival.

== Overview ==
=== Members ===
- Jeff Greinke (1993–2001)
- Dennis Rea (1993–2001)
- Lesli Dalaba (1993–2001)
- Ed Pias (1993–1996)
- George Soler (1996–1997)
- Bill Moyer (1996–1997)
- Greg Gilmore (1996–1997)
- Fred Chalenor (1998–2001)
- Bill Rieflin (1998–2001)

=== Collaborators ===
- Tori Nelson-Zagar - acoustic bass (1994)
- Scott Granlund - tenor saxophone (1994)
- Wang Yong - guzheng (1996)
- Doug Haire - mixing (1994), engineer (1996–2001), producer (1997)

=== Style ===
Land played a mixture of jazz, rock, ethnic/world music, and electronic music. Their first album and early performances tended to reflect Jeff Greinke's ambient music background. By 1997 their music had a much harder edge, best exemplified on their album Road Movies.

== History ==
Land was formed by Jeff Greinke in 1993. Guitarist Dennis Rea and trumpeter Lesli Dalaba were the other original members of Land and they were soon joined by drummer Ed Pias. Greinke and Rea had met in 1982 when Rea was a member of Savant and had performed together that year. Land's first self-titled album was recorded in 1994 and released by the Australian label Extreme in 1995. The label describes the album Land on its website: "Elements of jazz, ethnic, dance and ambient music are all evident, as well as the Fourth World sound of Jon Hassell." All of Land's albums started out as live radio broadcasts with, according to Dennis Rea, "...very little re-recording or cosmetic surgery after the fact, so they are accurate representations of the band's live sound."

A May, 1996 concert broadcast formed the basis for most of the second album, Archipelago. The group had expanded to a septet by that time, adding George Soler (Stick), and two additional percussionists: Greg Gilmore and Bill Moyer. It was this lineup, minus Ed Pias, who had left the group, that toured China in November–December, 1996, performing in Beijing, Kunming, and Chengdu, as well as Hong Kong, and Macau. The tour included a performance at the Beijing International Jazz Festival. In addition, during the festival on November 12 Rea and Dalaba performed with guzheng virtuoso Wang Yong, Austrian violinist Andreas Schreiber, Dutch drummer Han Bennink, and Claudio Puntin and Steffen Schorn on horns at Keep in Touch, reportedly China's first internet cafe. The jam session produced a mixture of American style free jazz and European influenced improvisation blended at times with traditional Chinese music. The results were captured on the album Free Touching: Live in Beijing at Keep in Touch, which was released as a double CD in March 2004. Wang Yong also joined Land on stage for their concert in Hong Kong.

"Deep", the final track for Archipelago, by the same lineup that had toured China, was recorded in February 1997, with finishing touches completed in July. The album was released on the Periplum label later that year.

By 1998, Land had gone through a number of personnel changes and had developed a much harder-edged sound. Andrew Bartlett, writing in a 1999 article in Seattle Weekly, described the music at that time, in part: "LAND's sound is a swirl—a clicking, cascading, jolting mix of sonorities and styles." Dennis Rea is quoted in the article: ""The current lineup is more of a 'rock' band than earlier editions, and is much more explosive and in-your-face. Our connection with ambient music is pretty tenuous at this point." The final incarnation of the band, which recorded the album Road Movies between June, 1998 and February, 1999, included Greinke, Rea, Dalaba, drummer Bill Rieflin, and bassist Fred Chalenor. Road Movies was not released until 2001 on the First World Music label. It was named one of the Top Ten releases of 2001 by Pulse! (Instrumental/Ambient) and the Seattle Weekly (Jazz).

Lesli Dalaba also left the band in 2001 and the remaining members decided to amicably part ways.

== Discography ==
- 1995 : Land
- 1997 : Archipelago
- 2001 : Road Movies
