= French Skyline =

Studio album by Earthstar
- Released: 1979
- Recorded: 1978–1979
- Genre: Experimental; Electronic; Ambient; Krautrock
- Length: 44:40
- Label: Sky
- Producer: Klaus Schulze & Craig Wuest

Earthstar chronology
Salterbarty Tales (1978)	French Skyline (1979)	Atomkraft? Nein, Danke! (1981)

French Skyline is the second full-length album by the American electronic band Earthstar. It was their first release for Hamburg, Germany–based Sky Records.

French Skyline was recorded in 1978 and 1979. The opening track, "Latin Sirens Face The Wall," was recorded at Klaus Schulze Studios in Hambühren, West Germany, and was engineered by Klaus Schulze. Bass and strings were recorded at Aura Sound Studios in New York City. All other tracks were recorded at Deponté la Rue Studio in Paris, France. Additional recording took place at four different studios in Germany and New York State. The album was released by Sky Records in 1979.

French Skyline strongly shows Klaus Schulze's musical influence on Craig Wuest and Earthstar. Wuest's idea was to create a wall of sound, as described by the New Gibraltar Encyclopedia of Progressive Rock: "...his desire apparently is to create music that doesn't necessarily suggest a particular instrument, rather creates a new texture. Therefore, though there are credits for flute, guitar, bass, violin, viola, French horn, sitar and vocals, it's pretty hard to distinguish any of these." French Skyline was also the first of three albums on which Wuest made heavy use of the Mellotron and the rare Birotron, a variation on the Mellotron that can sustain notes beyond eight seconds.

Klaus Schulze's presence is almost certainly a large part of the reason French Skyline is Earthstar's most successful album in terms of sales. Sky Records licensed a reissue on CD by Musique Intemporelle in 1999 without the approval or knowledge of Earthstar.

In December 2023, Made in Germany Music officially reissued French Skyline as part of the 5-CD set Collected Works.

== Track listing ==
1. "Latin Sirens Face the Wall" 19:39
  "Part I: Sirens" – 4:14
  "Part II: The Amazon" - 10:18
  "Part III: The Flourishing Illusion" - 5:07
2. "Splendored Skies and Angels" - 6:21
3. "French Sky Lines Suite" 18:38
  "Movement I: Morning Song (For Iris And Richard)" - 3:50
  "Movement II: Sources Change, including "The Movement" - 4:48
  "Movement III: 3 Demensional Music" - 4:47
  "Movement IV: Wind and Sky Symphony/Reprise: Morning Song" - 5:13

== Personnel ==
- Craig Wuest – synthesizers, Birotron, mellotron, piano, sitar, harp, sundrys, glass games, voice, vocoder, Tibetan bells, percussion, tape loops, treatments
- Dennis Rea – electric guitar, treated guitar, "tonewall"
- Norm Peach – bass, devices
- Tim Finnegan – flute, "templewind"
- Daryl Trivieri – "whaling violin", "sheets of sound"
- Louis Deponté – violin I, viola, treatments, recording of sea birds on the French coast
- Phil Novak – violin II, choir
- Marla Thomson – French horn, flute, choir
- Joan Novak (credited as Joan N.) – choir
- Dirk Schmalenbach – sitar
