= Atomkraft? Nein, Danke! =

Studio album by Earthstar
- Released: February 1981
- Recorded: 1979–1980
- Genre: Electronic; Ambient; Krautrock
- Length: 45:09
- Label: Sky
- Producer: Craig Wuest

Earthstar chronology
French Skyline (1979)	Atomkraft? Nein, Danke! (1981)	Humans Only (1982)

Atomkraft? Nein, Danke! is the third full-length album by the American electronic band Earthstar. It was their second release for the Hamburg, Germany-based Sky Records on February 1, 1981. Atomkraft? Nein, Danke! was recorded during 1979 and 1980 at Deponté la Rue Studio in Paris, France, and IC Studios and Emch Studio in West Germany. Additional tracks were recorded at Aura Sound Studio in New York. All tracks were written by Craig Wuest except "Golden Rendezvous", which was written by Wuest and Daniel Zongrone, and "Forest Floor, Part II: Aras", a tape-loop improvisation with guitarist Dennis Rea.

The title, Atomkraft? Nein, Danke! has been the slogan of the German anti-nuclear movement since the 70s and literally means "Nuclear power? No, thanks!", a possible reference to the Smiling Sun logo associated with this phrase. Craig Wuest's intention in recording this album was to create an environmental tone poem, and some tracks, particularly "Sonntagsspaziergang", have an almost symphonic sound. The Planet Mellotron Web site describes the album as "more laid back" than its predecessor French Skyline and "...an ideal opportunity to hear the rarest tape-replay instrument", the Birotron.

The track White Cloud was included on the Sky Records collection Schwingungen - New Age Music, released in 1985. This represented the first time any Earthstar track appeared on CD. Atomkraft? Nein, Danke! is still available on LP from Sky Records.

In December 2023, Made in Germany Music officially reissued Atomkraft? Nein, Danke! as part of the 5-CD set Collected Works.

== Track listing ==
1. "Golden Rendezvous" – 7:25
2. "Sonntagsspaziergang" (Sunday stroll) - 5:04
3. "Garden's End" - 3:00
4. "Wind Mills" - 5:30
5. "Cafe Sequence" - 2:05
6. "Cafe Exit (incl. March of the Flanged Angels)" - 5:40
7. "White Cloud" - 4:15
8. "Solar Mirrors" - 3:37
9. "Jet Sets" - 5:00
  ("Atomic Fallouts", "Flash to Ash")
10. "Forest Floor" - 7:20
  a. "Part I: Atomkraft? Nein, Danke!"
  b. "Part II: Aras"

== Personnel ==
- Craig Wuest – Minimoog, Polymoog, Korg synthesizer, String Ensemble, Elka Rhapsody, Birotron B90, "Night Machine", percussion, producer, engineer
- Daniel Zongrone – piano, bells, vibraphone
- Dennis Rea – electric guitar
- Louis Deponté – "Night Machine", tape loops, assistant engineer
- Daryl Trivieri – electric violin
- Martin Burdette Martinez – electric guitar on "Garden's End"
- Rainer Böhm – violin
- Christoph Lagemann – cello
- Melanie Coiro – bells, Percussion
- John Bunkfeldt – harmonizer, engineer
- Gert Anders – engineer
