= Salterbarty Tales =

Studio album by Earthstar
- Released: 1978
- Recorded: 1977–1978
- Genre: Electronic, ambient
- Label: Moontower Records
- Producer: Craig Wuest

Earthstar chronology
| Salterbarty Tales (1978) | French Skyline (1979) |

Salterbarty Tales is the debut album by the American electronic band Earthstar. It was recorded in 1977 and 1978 and released by Moontower Records in 1978. The album is the only release to feature significant grand piano sections performed by Craig Wuest with relatively basic synthesizer work and far less multitracking when compared to later Earthstar albums. It is also the only album not to feature tape loop instruments: the mellotron and the Birotron.

Salterbarty Tales has been described as "impossible to find" by Earthstar guitarist Dennis Rea. A few copies sold online in 2007 ranged in price from US $75 to US $125.

In December 2023, Made in Germany Music officially reissued Salterbarty Tales as part of the 5-CD set Collected Works.

== Track listing ==
Side A

1. Splendored Skies and Angels – 5:48
2. Serindego – 9:11
  (including Rapid of HU)
3. Salterbarty Overture – 3:03
4. Wee Voices Touch - 1:32
5. Broken Chain of Euphoria – 8:30

Side B

1. Canyon Nebula – 22:10
  (including Rapter Relcafe, Sunspots Theme, Rapter Releafe Reprise - Final.)
2. Night Tones – 5:15
3. Sunsets – 1:14
4. Shades – 1:02

== Personnel ==
- Craig Wuest – piano, synthesizers
- Dennis Rea – guitar
- Daryl Trivieri – violin
- Norm Peach – bass
- Daniel Zongrone – percussion
- Tim Finnegan – flute
