= Earthstar =

Earthstar may refer to:

- Fungi in the genus Geastrum
- Earthstar (band), a 1970s and 1980s American band

== See also ==
- Earth Star (disambiguation)
