= Serpentine (Han Bennink and Dave Douglas album) =

Studio album by Han Bennink and Dave Douglas
- Released: 1996
- Recorded: January 30, 1996
- Studio: Koeienverhuur (Rent-a-Cow) Studio, Purmerend, Holland
- Genre: Free jazz
- Length: 54:53
- Label: Songlines Recordings; SGL 1510-2
- Producer: Dave Douglas

Han Bennink chronology
Clusone 3 (1991)	Serpentine (1996)	3 (1997)

Serpentine is an album by percussionist Han Bennink and trumpeter Dave Douglas. Featuring 13 short tracks consisting of original tunes, standards, and free improvisations, it was recorded on January 30, 1996, at Koeienverhuur (Rent-a-Cow) Studio in Purmerend, Holland, and was released later that year by the Canadian Songlines label.

== Reception ==
Professional ratings
Review scores
Source	Rating
AllMusic	3/5 stars
MusicHound Jazz	4/5 stars
The Penguin Guide to Jazz	3/4 stars

AllMusic's Joslyn Layne called the album "a hearty, exploratory meeting," and wrote: "While not as wowing as some of Bennink's other duo work... this 1996 studio recording captures the good interaction of two excellent creative musicians."

The authors of The Penguin Guide to Jazz Recordings praised the duo's rendition of "Cherokee", calling it "vividly comic but also deeply felt."

In a review for NPR's Fresh Air, Kevin Whitehead stated: "Other musicians can't let their guard down when they play with Bennink, because he can always make them jump in surprise... Douglas has some things Han Bennink is always looking out for: swinging rhythm, and the stamina and self-confidence to spar with a drummer who doesn't tire out." Whitehead also included the album in MTV's list of ten recommended recordings of Dutch jazz, and commented: "the trumpeter's iron chops allow him to stand up to Bennink's onslaught on drums, although Bennink also spends a lot of time clogging, wooden shoes clattering on the studio's concrete floor."

The editors of MusicHound Jazz noted that Douglas "is an excellent foil for Bennink," and remarked: "He knows Bennink's tricks and throws in a few of his own."

Author Todd Jenkins described the album as "bracing," calling "Alap" "introspective and magnificent," and writing: "a sizzling undercurrent of electricity courses through most selections."

== Track listing ==
1. "Two Clogs For Comfort" (Dave Douglas, Han Bennink) – 2:27
2. "Too Close for Comfort" (Jerry Bock, George David Weiss, Lawrence Holofcener) – 4:32
3. "Stekelbaarsje" (Dave Douglas, Han Bennink) – 3:01
4. "Neck Four" (Dave Douglas, Han Bennink) – 4:44
5. "Young and Foolish" (Albert Hague, Arnold Horwitt) – 3:54
6. "Serpentine" (Dave Douglas) – 4:15
7. "Rein" (Han Bennink) – 3:54
8. "Greenleaf" (Dave Douglas) – 2:01
9. "Alap" (Dave Douglas, Han Bennink) – 11:36
10. "Cherokee" (Ray Noble) – 4:07
11. "Zvv" (Dave Douglas, Han Bennink) – 1:35
12. "Delft" (Dave Douglas) – 6:00
13. "Inamorata" (Dave Douglas, Han Bennink) – 2:14

== Personnel ==
- Han Bennink – drums, cymbals, clogs, French violin, harmonica, "other stuff"
- Dave Douglas – trumpet
