= Land (Land album) =

Studio album by LAND
- Released: September 6th, 1995
- Recorded: 1994
- Genre: Jazz; rock; electronic; world music
- Length: 61:27
- Label: Extreme
- Producer: Jeff Greinke

LAND chronology
| Land (1995) | Archipelago (1997) |

Professional ratings
Review scores
| Source | Rating |
|---|---|
| Allmusic | 2/5 stars |

Land is the first full-length album by the American group Land. Land was recorded at Jack Straw Productions in Seattle in 1994 and released by the Australian label Extreme in 1995. All tracks were composed by Jeff Greinke with the exception of "Shu", which was composed by Greinke and Dennis Rea.

Prior to Land group leader Jeff Greinke's solo albums had been mainly heavily layered and textured ambient music. With Land Greinke's goal "was to push this layering technique using a four-piece band, although texture continues to be a focus." Chris Nickson, in his Allmusic review, describes LAND, in part, as "...an album that teases, tickles, grates, and always satisfies in its ambition and performance." and adds that Land "...create an organic -- if often electronic -- whole. The textures shift like waves, sometimes quietly, sometimes evoking specific places, such as the bamboo tones of China, on "Shu." "Ku" becomes disquieting with its discordance, but overall this is quite a subdued record."

== Track listing ==
1. Caravan – 7:54
2. Bustle - 5:16
3. Nightnoise - 9:29
4. Ku - 8:04
5. Shu - 7:14
6. Limba - 7:21
7. Jacks - 6:39
8. India 9:30

== Personnel ==
- Jeff Greinke - Keyboards, voice, producer.
- Ed Pias - Electric & acoustic drums and percussion
- Lesli Dalaba - Trumpet, effects
- Dennis Rea - Guitar, effects
- Tori Nelson-Zagar - Acoustic bass on "Nightnoise"
- Scott Granlund - Tenor saxophone on "India"
- Doug Haire - mixing on "Jacks"
