= Brötzmann/Van Hove/Bennink =

Studio album by Peter Brötzmann, Fred Van Hove, and Han Bennink
- Released: 1973
- Recorded: February 25, 1973
- Studio: Bremen, Germany
- Genre: Free improvisation
- Length: 39:59
- Label: FMP; 0130
- Producer: Jost Gebers

Peter Brötzmann chronology
Balls (1970)	Brötzmann/Van Hove/Bennink (1973)	Hot Lotta (1973)

Brötzmann/Van Hove/Bennink (also known by its catalog number, FMP 130 or FMP 0130) is an album by saxophonist Peter Brötzmann, pianist Fred Van Hove, and drummer Han Bennink. It was recorded on February 25, 1973, in Bremen, Germany, and was initially released on vinyl later that year by the FMP label. In 2003, it was reissued on CD by Atavistic Records as part of their Unheard Music Series, and in 2015, it was reissued on vinyl by Cien Fuegos, an imprint of Trost Records.

== Reception ==
Professional ratings
Review scores
Source	Rating
AllMusic	4.5/5 stars
The Penguin Guide to Jazz	3/4 stars
Tom Hull – on the Web	B

In a review for AllMusic, Stewart Mason called the album "an excellent introduction to this circle of composer/performers for the cautious neophyte" due to its "varied dynamic and the brief, accessible song lengths."

Jay Collins of All About Jazz stated that the album "displays the trio at its apex," and described it as "a resilient document containing compositionally condensed pieces that embrace a startlingly broad scope of textures and moods." He commented: "This record presents plenty of surprises that may appeal to a wide variety of listeners and surely it is essential for followers of these renegade musicians." AAJ's Kurt Gottschalk noted that when the musicians gathered for the recording session, "it was with a sense of discovery, a mutual wide-eyedness that made anything possible." He remarked: "The ten tracks... are funny and strange, squalling and even cute... It's good fun... and quite often quite listenable." Another AAJ reviewer wrote: "Each of these three players has a decidedly self-confident, assertive style, and that's what makes the combination work... This one is half goofy, half insane."

Writing for Exclaim!, Eric Hill called the album a "free jazz monster-piece... rich and terrifying," and commented: "This trio brought vibrant energy and precision of improvisation into the studio setting that few contemporary or current jazz outfits could match even in a live performance... no hint of hesitation or backward glancing ever enters play. A definite high watermark for all involved."

JazzWord's Ken Waxman stated: "the Brötzmann crew makes it clear that they're ripping a hole in the jazz tradition, even if they figuratively have to do it with their bare hands... They don't make 'em like they used to, and if your tastes run to hell-bent-for-leather improvising you won't want to miss out on FMP 0130."

== Track listing ==
1. "For Donaueschingen Ever" (Han Bennink) – 3.40
2. "Konzert für 2 klarinetten" (Peter Brötzmann) – 4.07
3. "Nr. 7" (Peter Brötzmann) – 3.20
4. "Wir haben uns folgendes 4.überlegt" (Fred Van Hove) – 2.56
5. "Paukenhändschen im blaubeerenwald" (Han Bennink) – 5.56
6. "Nr. 9" (Peter Brötzmann) – 1.35
7. "Gere bij" (Fred Van Hove) – 5.25
8. "Nr. 4" (Peter Brötzmann) – 4.45
9. "Nr. 6" (Peter Brötzmann) – 5.33
10. "Donaueschingen For Ever" (Han Bennink) – 2.27

== Personnel ==
- Peter Brötzmann – clarinet, alto saxophone, tenor saxophone, baritone saxophone, bass saxophone
- Fred Van Hove – piano, celeste
- Han Bennink – drums, khene, rhythm-box, selfmade clarinet, gachi, oe-oe, voice, tins, home-made junk, elong, dhung, kaffir piano, dhung-dkar
