= Jazz Bunker =

Live album by Han Bennink, Eugene Chadbourne, and Toshinori Kondo
- Released: 2000
- Recorded: February 1980
- Venue: Jazz Bunker, Rotterdam, Holland
- Genre: Free improvisation
- Length: 1:33:58
- Label: Golden Years of New Jazz; GY 7/8
- Producer: Eugene Chadbourne, Leo Feigin

Han Bennink chronology
The Laughing Owl (2000)	Jazz Bunker (2000)	Nerve Beats (2001)

Jazz Bunker is a live double album by Han Bennink, Eugene Chadbourne, and Toshinori Kondo. Featuring a wide variety of instrumentation, it was recorded during February 1980 at the Jazz Bunker in Rotterdam, Holland, and was not released until 2000, when it was issued on CD by Golden Years of New Jazz, an imprint of Leo Records.

== Reception ==
Professional ratings
Review scores
Source	Rating
All About Jazz	3.5/5 stars
AllMusic	4/5 stars
The Penguin Guide to Jazz	3.5/4 stars

In a review for AllMusic, Steve Loewy called Jazz Bunker "an absolutely fascinating exposition of free jazz," and wrote: "the three musicians fly high, with more than a dozen different instruments represented... the whole conglomeration is outrageously wild. While sometimes it all seems somewhat anarchic, there are nonetheless plenty of rewarding moments."

The authors of The Penguin Guide to Jazz Recordings described the album as "a meeting of three masters of cracked extravagance," and commented: "it is much more traditional in flavour than most European improvised music... for much of the way it hardly feels avant-garde at all... as a constantly surprising, intense and funny piece of documentation, it ranks highly in this area."

Glenn Astarita of All About Jazz stated: "we are presented with 2 CDs of frolicsome fun and boisterous improvisation... the boys were letting their hair down and must have been enjoying themselves yet it may be a tad difficult getting through both CDs in one sitting. Perhaps this recording should be reserved for the proper – emotional – occasion, or at a time when life's trivialities become overly persistent."

Coda's Stuart Broomer remarked: "these 2 CDs of non-stop 1980 improv often surprise... the result here is explosive energy music, with Kondo often keeping things moving in direct lines."

== Track listing ==
Disc 1

1. "Untitled" – 47:12

Disc 2

1. "Untitled" – 46:48

== Personnel ==
- Han Bennink – drums, piano, tenor saxophone, soprano saxophone, B♭ clarinet, trombone, harmonica, voice
- Eugene Chadbourne – electric guitar, acoustic guitar, piano, voice, effects
- Toshinori Kondo – trumpet, euphonium, effects, percussion, voice
