= Jeff Greinke =

- Origin: United States
- Genres: Ambient rock Dark ambient Electronic rock Noise rock Jazz rock folk rock Experimental
- Occupation: Musician
- Instruments: Keyboards, guitar
- Years active: 1980–present
- Labels: Intrepid, Multimood, Dossier, First World Music, Ear-Rational, Hypnos, Silent, Prudence, Periplum, Extreme, Linden, Projekt, Weird Amplexus, Lotusspike
- Website: Official website

Jeff Greinke (b. 1959) is an American ambient rock and jazz rock artist and composer currently based in Tucson, Arizona. He is known as one of the pioneers of dark ambient music, with his earlier solo albums often compared to works by Robert Rich, Brian Eno, and Vidna Obmana. Greinke's approach on his ambient works is to heavily layer, multitrack, and texture soundscapes, effectively using the studio as an instrument.

In 1993 Greinke founded the group LAND, described by guitarist Dennis Rea as "an odd blend of jazz, rock, electronic, and world music." LAND released three albums between 1995 and 2001 and also played live extensively, including a 1996 tour of China, Hong Kong, and Macau.

Greinke is also half of the duo Hana with Sky Cries Mary vocalist Anisa Romero. Hana has released two albums to date.

Greinke spent his early life in New Jersey, later moving with his family to Chicago and Pennsylvania. He studied meteorology at Penn State University, where he began composing and performing music in 1980, then relocated to Seattle in 1982, before eventually settling in Tucson.

== Discography ==
In LAND

- 1995 : LAND (studio album)
- 1997 : Archipelago (studio album)
- 2001 : Road Movies (studio album)

In Hana

- 1999 : Hana (studio album)
- 2001 : Omen (studio album)

with Rob Angus

- 1984 : Night and Fog (studio album)
- 1992 : Crossing Ngoli (studio album)

with Pierre Perret

- 1989 : Fragment 1 (studio album)

with Art Zoyd and J.A. Deane

- 1990 : Art Zoyd – J.A. Deane – J. Greinke (studio album)

with Faith & Disease

- 2002 : Dream the Red Clouds

Solo albums

- 1984 : Before the Storm (studio album)
- 1985 : Cities in Fog (studio album)
- 1986 : Over Ruins (studio album)
- 1987 : Places of Motility (studio album)
- 1987 : Moving Climates (studio album)
- 1988 : Timbral Planes (studio album)
- 1990 : Changing Skies (studio album)
- 1992 : Lost Terrain (studio album)
- 1993 : In Another Place (studio album)
- 1994 : Big Weather (studio album)
- 1997 : Cities in Fog 2 (studio album)
- 1998 : Swimming (studio album)
- 1999 : Ride (studio album)
- 2002 : Wide View (studio album)
- 2003 : Weather From Another Planet
  (studio album)
- 2004 : Soundtracks (studio album)
- 2007 : Winter Light (studio album)
- 2009 : Virga (studio album)
- 2011 : Cities In Fog 2 (studio album)
- 2013 : Scenes From A Train (studio album)
- 2018 : Before Sunrise (studio album)
- 2021 : Other Weather (studio album)
