= Amplified Trio =

Studio album by Han Bennink
- Released: 2007
- Genre: Free improvisation
- Label: Treader trd008
- Producer: Ashley Wales, John Coxon

Han Bennink chronology
Zeng! (2007)	Amplified Trio (2007)	Monk Volume One (2008)

Amplified Trio is an album featuring the Dutch drummer Han Bennink, along with John Coxon and Ashley Wales of the electronic music duo Spring Heel Jack. Released in 2007, the album was produced by Treader, a label operated by Coxon and Wales.

== Reception ==
Professional ratings
Review scores
Source	Rating
The Penguin Guide to Jazz	3/4 stars

The authors of The Penguin Guide to Jazz Recordings called the album "a fine, sometimes boisterous and always good-natured encounter," and noted that "Coxon's guitar has acquired a distinctiveness... and he leads most of these... improvs."

Ivana Ng of All About Jazz described the album as "austere and effortless," and praised Bennink's "ineffable charisma and brilliant drumming." She wrote: "Bennink brings a jazz sensibility to Coxon and Wales' electronic musings. As Wales' ambient sounds writhe in time with Coxon's guitar, Bennink's drum kit undulates from low to high, soft to loud, slow to fast, crouching to pouncing."

Dusted Magazine's John Eyles stated: "In typical fashion, Bennink grabs the music by the scruff of the neck and completely dominates proceedings. The album title is no idle promise; the music bursts with energy... His energy seems to spur on Coxon & Wales, who give as energized a performance as I can recall. This, in turn, drives Bennink on. A virtuous circle indeed."

A reviewer for the Downtown Music Gallery commented: "Loud, fierce and darkly mysterious, the velocity and extraordinary momentum of Bennink is forcefully counterpointed by Wales' imaginitive soundscapes and Coxon's irascible guitar."

Writing for Eartrip Magazine, Seth Watter remarked: "What I find so remarkable about groups like this is the way that each instrument blends into its peers, no matter how disparate they are in sound... The three create a music that is unpredictable, yet deliberate and logical in its own way... Amplified Trio is the beauty of a voice arrested midflight. Let's stop and take a look at that one again."

== Track listing ==
1. "At 1" – 20:05
2. "At 2" – 5:15
3. "At 3" – 9:38
4. "At 4" – 8:54
5. "At 5" – 8:29
6. "At 6" – 1:42
7. "At 7" – 4:14

== Personnel ==
- Han Bennink – drums
- John Coxon – electric guitar
- Ashley Wales – electronics, samples
