= Parken (album) =

Live album by Han Bennink
- Released: 2009
- Venue: Epidemin, Göteborg, Sweden
- Genre: Jazz
- Label: ILK Music; 156CD

Han Bennink chronology
In Amherst 2006 (2008)	Parken (2009)	Han & Frode (2009)

Parken is a live album by drummer Han Bennink. It was recorded at Epidemin in Göteborg, Sweden, and was released in 2009 by ILK Music. On the album, Bennink is joined by clarinetist Joachim Badenhorst, pianist Simon Toldam, and, for one track, vocalist Qarin Wikström.

== Reception ==
Professional ratings
Review scores
Source	Rating
AllMusic	4/5 stars
DownBeat	4/5 stars
All About Jazz #1	4/5 stars
All About Jazz #2	4/5 stars
The Free Jazz Collective	4/5 stars

In review for AllMusic, Michael G. Nastos wrote: "Always entertaining, on the edge and humorous, Bennink's trio creates not so much a new sound as a broader range of expressionism for the drummer to take off and zoom through both familiar and challenging new territory. This is a recording that should easily please all of Bennink's followers, and comes highly recommended."

Peter Margasak, writing for DownBeat, stated that Bennink "plays with jazz fundamentals like putty, warping his for the tradition in service of spontaneous inspiration... Bennink flips between crisp, infectious swing and explosive chaos; sometimes fluidly, sometimes jarringly... Like so much of the best Dutch jazz, this trio lovingly reveals its affection for the tradition while simultaneously rejecting any suberservience to it."

In an article for All About Jazz, David McLean wrote that the album is as "diverse as [Bennink's] musical background, offering a degree of accessibility arguably absent on many recordings by the Bennink's contemporaries." He commented: "Parken's combination of composition and abstraction is what makes it such a rewarding listen.... It is an album that perfectly embodies its leader's multidisciplinary skills... and is played with restraint and recklessness and an interaction that at points borders on telepathy. A rewarding listen that is only encouraged by its accessibility, and a valuable entry into this unique musician's oeuvre."

A reviewer for The Free Jazz Collective stated that the album is "one on which the trio shows their broad background in jazz, ranging from blues and swing to wild excursions into uncharted territories," and remarked: "A really nice album, full of creative craftmanship, respect for music and an inherent sense of fun and joy in every note being played."

== Track listing ==
1. "Music for Camping" (Toldam) – 9:51
2. "Flemische March" (Bennink/Badenhorst/Toldam) – 4:19
3. "Lady of the Lavender Mist" (Duke Ellington) – 5:46
4. "Myckewelk" (Bennink/Badenhorst/Toldam) – 2:00
5. "Isfahan" (Billy Strayhorn, Duke Ellington) – 6:20
6. "Reedeater" (Badenhorst) – 6:44
7. "Fleurette africaine" (Duke Ellington) – 4:20
8. "After the March" (Bennink/Badenhorst/Toldam) – 5:23
9. "Parken" (Stephan Sieben/Josefine Lindstrand) – 3:57

== Personnel ==
- Han Bennink – drums
- Joachim Badenhorst – clarinet, bass clarinet
- Simon Toldam – piano
- Qarin Wikström – vocals (track 9)
