= Earthstar (band) =

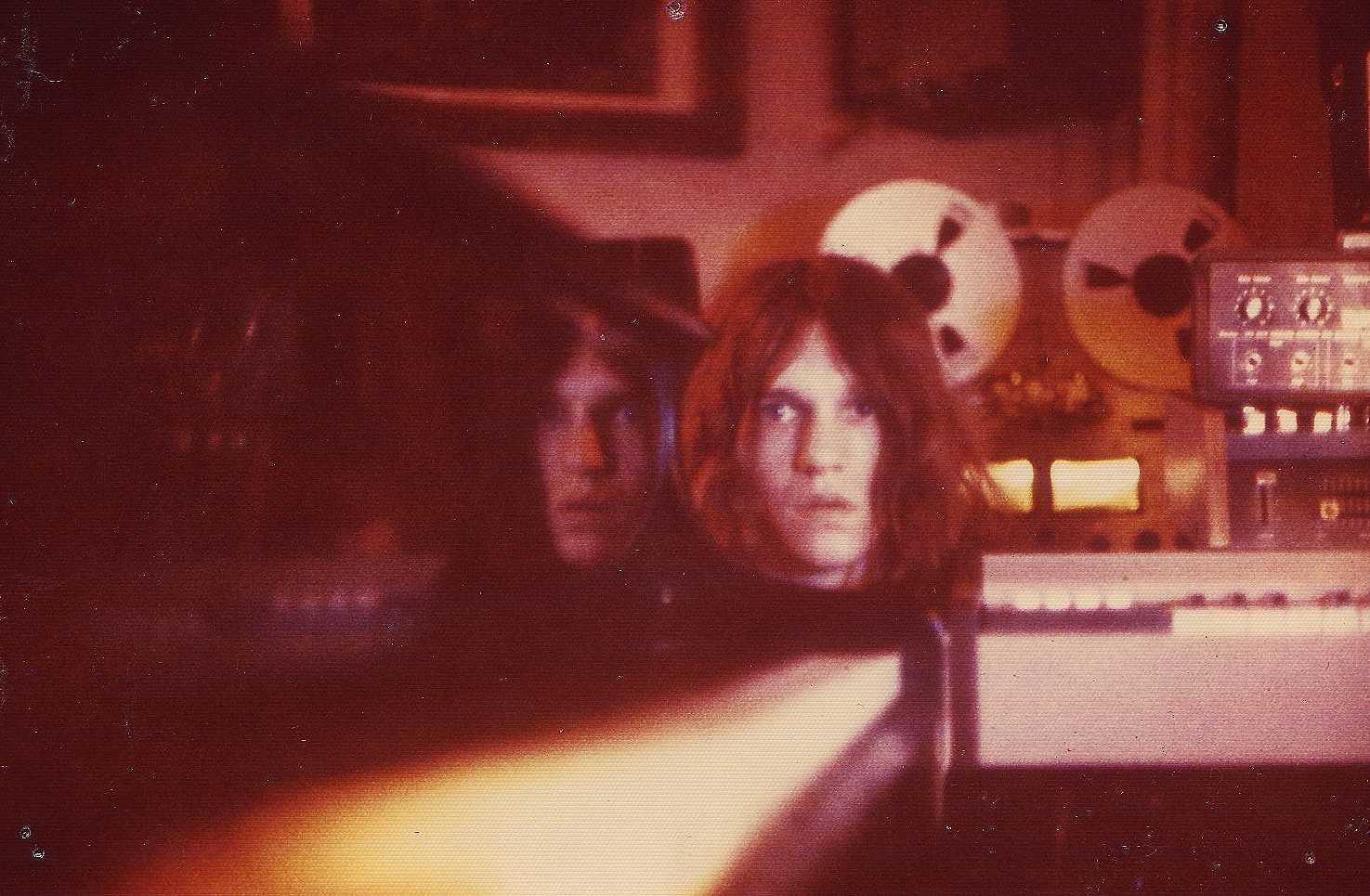
- Craig Wuest of Earthstar in 1977

Background information
- Origin: Utica, New York, United States
- Genres: Electronic music Kosmische musik Ambient music
- Years active: 1977–1983
- Labels: Sky Records, Moontower Records
- Past members: Craig Wuest; Dennis Rea; Tim Finnegan; Daniel Zongrone; Norm Peach; Daryl Trivieri; Louis Deponté; Phil Novak; Marla Thomson; Dan Hapanowicz; Richard Hooker; Andy Retscher; Bob Mishalanie; Melanie Coiro; Rainer Böhm; Christoph Lagemann; John Bunkfeldt

Earthstar is an electronic music group from Utica, New York. Earthstar was encouraged by Krautrock/Kosmische Musik/electronic music artist, composer, and producer Klaus Schulze to relocate to Germany where they contracted with Sky Records. Schulze inspired and produced their second album, French Skyline. Earthstar is notable as the only American band who participated in Germany's Kosmische Musik/electronic music scene while still at its height.

The New Gibraltar Encyclopedia of Progressive Rock describes Earthstar as a “wall of sound.” Wuest's vision and compositions propel the band along with composers Dennis Rea and Daniel Zongrone. The composed music doesn't necessarily suggest a particular instrument but rather creates a sound texture. There are credits for traditional musical instruments including sitar and vocals that may be difficult to distinguish. Earthstar's style on French Skyline has been compared to Wolfgang Bock, Sangiuliano, and Klaus Schulze's own recordings. Other albums have a softer style with more distinct instrumentation.

Earthstar is also notable for Craig Wuest's heavy use of the Mellotron and the rare Birotron, a variation on the Mellotron that can sustain notes beyond eight seconds.

== History ==
=== 1977–1979 (Utica and Moontower) ===
Earthstar was the brainchild of keyboardist/synthesist Craig Wuest. A native of Utica, New York, Wuest was heavily influenced by the German electronic music scene of the 1970s, including Klaus Schulze, Popol Vuh, Tangerine Dream, Kraftwerk, and Harmonia. Around the same time, Utica guitarist Dennis Rea had founded what he describes as an "eccentric progressive rock band," Zuir. According to Rea, "...being the only two adventurous music acts in town, collaboration between Craig and the members of Zuir was inevitable."

Rea also recalls concerts during the Utica period: "The group performed live only a handful of times, mostly at inappropriate venues like roadhouse bars and college beer halls, with predictable results."

=== 1979–1983 (Germany and Sky) ===
Craig Wuest was an admirer of electronic music pioneer Klaus Schulze, with whom he struck up a correspondence. Schulze encouraged Wuest and Earthstar to come to Germany, intending to sign them to his Innovative Communications record label. Wuest sold his grand piano, which had played a prominent part on Salterbarty Tales, to finance the move.

While much of French Skyline was recorded at Klaus Schulze studios in Hambühren, West Germany, with additional recording taking place at IC Studios in Ovelgönne, Schulze's label never signed Earthstar. The group's next three albums were released by Hamburg-based Sky Records instead, beginning with French Skyline in 1979, which was co-produced by Schulze and Wuest. Schulze's influence on Earthstar and Wuest is clearly heard on French Skyline, with reviewer Victor "Philip" Parau describing Earthstar at the time as "granted a classic place" within "the Berlin School electronic sessions."

Earthstar's second album for Sky, Atomkraft? Nein, Danke! (literally "Nuclear power? No, thank you!"), was an environmental tone poem. The album was recorded in 1979 and 1980 and was released on February 1, 1981. The Planet Mellotron Web site describes it as "more laid back" than French Skyline and "...an ideal opportunity to hear the rarest tape-replay instrument," the Birotron.

A third album for Sky, Humans Only, was recorded in 1981 and released the following year. The album was the result of a partnership between Wuest and Utica-based guitarist and songwriter Dan Hapanowicz.

=== Later works? ===
According to Dennis Rea, Earthstar dissolved not long after the release of Humans Only. A now defunct earthstarmusic.com Web site listed three later releases. Axiom, which was listed as following Humans Only, was recorded in Germany in 1980 and the United States in 1984. MP3 samples of the music revealed a conventional, melodic, controlled electronic music sound. By this point Earthstar had become Wuest's solo project, as indicated in the description of the album Big Blue Piano. The website listed both Big Blue Piano and a collection of unreleased material called Eve as having been released by Electronic America Records in 2000. However, no record of the actual release of these later works can be found.

After the Earthstar sessions guitarist Dennis Rea moved to Seattle where he met electronic composer Kerry Leimer, who had released a number of albums. Leimer, looking to create danceable electronic music, had formed Savant. Rea joined Savant in 1982, contributing to the album The Neo-Realist (at Risk), described by Downbeat magazine as "pan-ethnic techno-dub music".

In 1983 Rea moved to New York City where he once again worked with former Earthstar member Daniel Zongrone. The pair composed music for an exhibition of painter (and former Earthstar violinist) Daryl Trivieri's work at the Semaphore East Gallery in the East Village in 1985. Rea returned to Seattle in 1986 where he is the sole former Earthstar member still actively recording music. Zongrone recorded a solo album, Absolute Zero, in 1987 and composed the music for the 1998 film The Glasshead. He is currently artist in residence, composing, recording and working with longtime colleague Dennis Rea.

Sky Records did include Earthstar tracks on both volumes of their Schwingungen - New Age Music compilations in 1985 and 1986.

In 2023, Made In Germany Music acquired the rights to the Earthstar catalog and released the 5-CD set Collected Works, compiling all four studio albums for Moontower and Sky Records as well as the previously unreleased album Sleeper The Nightlifer.

== Discography ==
=== Studio albums ===
- 1978 Salterbarty Tales
- 1979 French Skyline
- 1981 Atomkraft? Nein, Danke! (Nuclear power? No, thanks!, a common slogan in Germany against nuclear power)
- 1982 Humans Only

=== Compilations ===
- 1980 Picture Music Instrumental - Vol. III (Sky Records LP sampler featuring Earthstar, Brian Eno, Hans-Joachim Roedelius, Dieter Moebius, Conny Plank, a.o.)
  - Track: "French Skyline Suite; Movement 1: Morning Song"
- 1985 Schwingungen - New Age Music Vol. I (Sky Records CD sampler featuring Earthstar, Brian Eno, Cluster, Harald Grosskopf, Adelbert Von Deyen, a.o.)
  - Track: "White Cloud"
- 1986 Schwingungen - New Age Music Vol. II (Sky Records CD sampler featuring Earthstar, Brian Eno, Cluster, Serge Blenner, Nik Tyndall, a.o.)
  - Track: "Latin Sirens Face The Wall"
- 2023 Collected Works (M.i.G Music, GmbH)

== See also ==
- List of ambient music artists
