= Free Touching: Live in Beijing at Keep in Touch =

2004 live album by Wang Yong et al

Free Touching: Live in Beijing at Keep In Touch

Live album by Wang Yong, Han Bennink, Andreas Schreiber, Dennis Rea, Steffen Schorn, Claudio Puntin & Lesli Dalaba
- Released: 2004
- Recorded: November 12, 1996
- Genre: Free jazz Free improvisation World music
- Length: 2:01:04
- Label: Noise Asia Records

Han Bennink chronology
Strandjutters (2003)	Free Touching: Live in Beijing at Keep In Touch (2004)	Still Quite Popular After All Those Years (2004)

Dennis Rea chronology
Shadow In Dreams (1990)	Free Touching: Live in Beijing at Keep in Touch (2004)	Views From Chicheng Precipice (2010)

Free Touching: Live at Keep in Touch is a live recording of improvisational performances by Chinese guzheng virtuoso Wang Yong and six international musicians: Dutch jazz drummer Han Bennink, Austrian violinist Andreas Schreiber, American guitarist Dennis Rea, American trumpeter Lesli Dalaba, and horn players Claudio Puntin and Steffen Schorn. The jam session from which the album is drawn was recorded during the Beijing International Jazz Festival on November 12, 1996, at Keep In Touch, reportedly China's first internet cafe.

The recorded performances are a mixture of American style free jazz and European influenced improvisation blended at times with traditional Chinese music. On his website Dennis Rea states that Free Touching: Live in Beijing at Keep in Touch is "quite possibly the first recording of free improvisation to emerge from China."

The album was released as a double CD in March, 2004 on the Hong Kong–based Noise Asia Records label. It is distributed in North America by Verge Music Distributing.

== Track listing ==
Red Disc – 58:51

1. "Improvisation 1"
2. "Improvisation 2"
3. "Improvisation 3"
4. "Improvisation 4"
5. "Improvisation 5"
6. "Improvisation 6"

Pink Disc – 62:13

1. "Improvisation 7"
2. "Improvisation 8"
3. "Improvisation 9"
4. "Improvisation 10"
5. "Improvisation 11"

== Personnel ==
- Wang Yong – guzheng
- Han Bennink – drums
- Andreas Schreiber – violin
- Dennis Rea – guitar
- Steffen Schorn – horns
- Claudio Puntin – horns
- Lesli Dalaba – trumpet
