= Han Bennink =

Dutch drummer (born 1942)

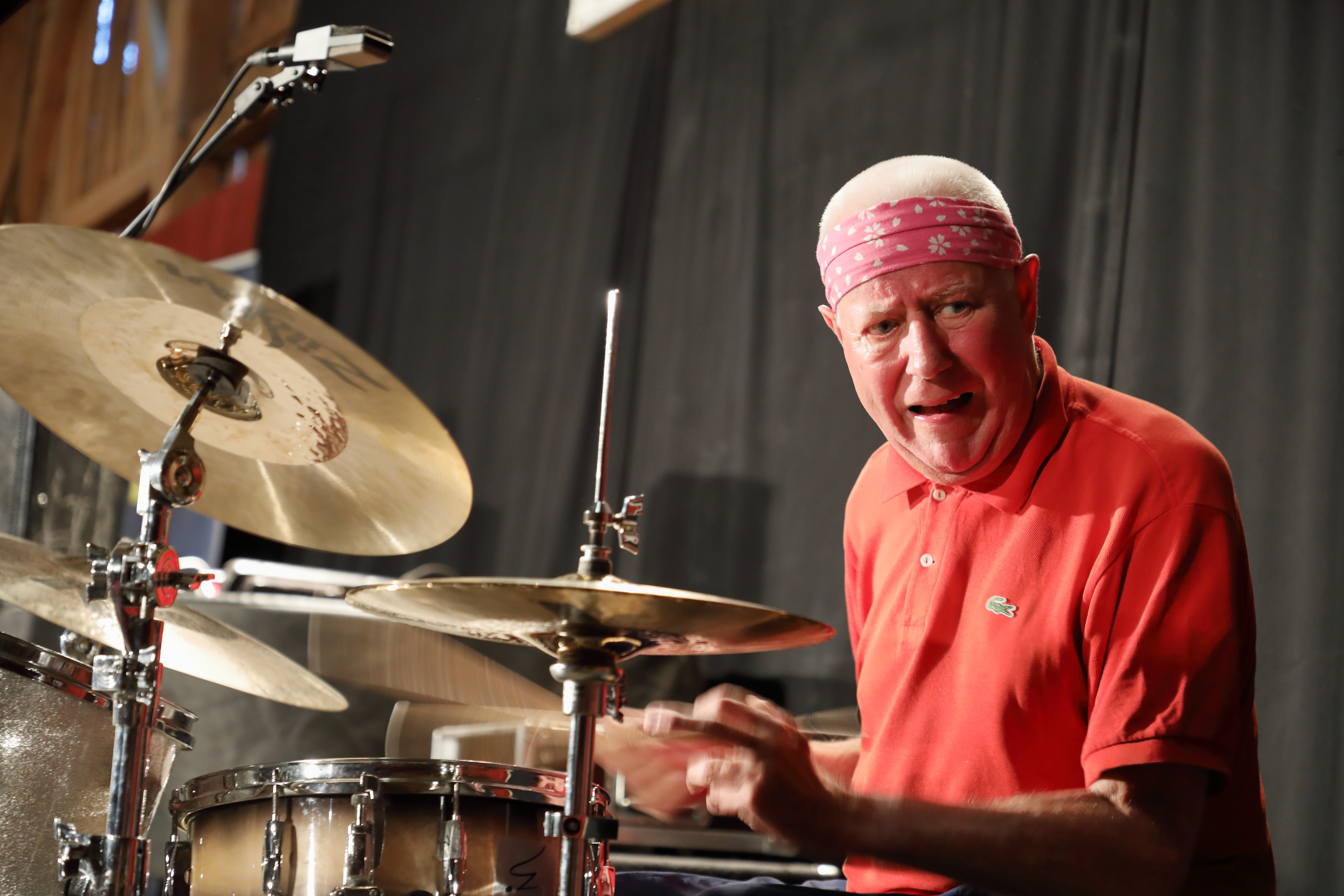
- Bennink at INNtöne Jazzfestival 2019

Background information
- Born: 17 April 1942 (age 83)
- Origin: Zaandam, the Netherlands
- Genres: European free jazz Avant-garde jazz Free improvisation
- Occupation: Musician
- Instruments: Drums, percussion

Han Bennink (born 17 April 1942) is a Dutch drummer and percussionist. On occasion his recordings have featured him playing soprano saxophone, bass clarinet, trombone, violin, banjo and piano.

Though perhaps best known as one of the pivotal figures in early European free jazz and free improvisation, Bennink has worked in essentially every school of jazz, and is described by critic Chris Kelsey as "one of the unfortunately rare musicians whose abilities and interests span jazz's entire spectrum." Known for often injecting slapstick and absurdist humor into his performances, Bennink has had especially fruitful long-term partnerships with pianist Misha Mengelberg and saxophonist Peter Brötzmann. Han is a brother of saxophonist Peter Bennink.

== Early life and education ==
Bennink was born in Zaandam, the son of a classical percussionist. He played the drums and the clarinet during his teens.

== Performing career ==
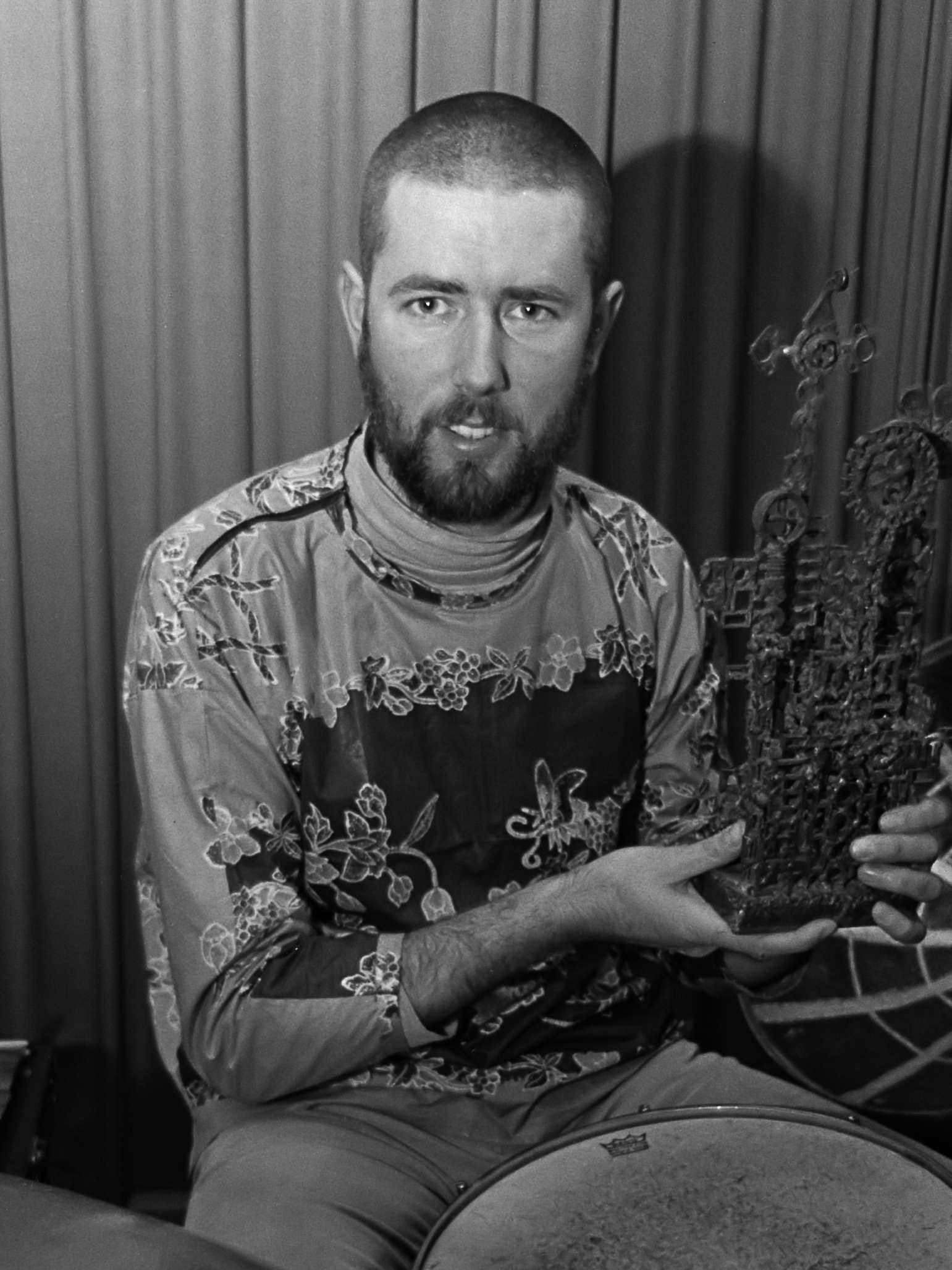
Han Bennink awarded (1967)

Through the 1960s he was the drummer with a number of American musicians visiting the Netherlands, including Dexter Gordon, Wes Montgomery, Sonny Rollins and Eric Dolphy (he is present on Dolphy's recording, Last Date (1964)).

He subsequently became a central figure in the emerging European free improvisation scene. In 1963 he formed a quartet with pianist Misha Mengelberg and saxophonist Piet Noordijk which performed at the 1966 Newport Jazz Festival. In 1967 he was a co-founder of the Instant Composers Pool with Mengelberg and Willem Breuker, which sponsored Dutch avant garde performances. From the late 1960s, he played in a trio with saxophonist Peter Brötzmann and Belgian pianist Fred Van Hove, which became a duo after Van Hove's departure in 1976. Through much of the 1990s, he played in Clusone 3 (also known as the Clusone Trio), a trio with saxophonist/clarinetist Michael Moore and cellist Ernst Reijseger. He has often played duos with Mengelberg and collaborated with him alongside other musicians.

From the late 1980s through the early 2000s, Bennik collaborated closely with Dutch post-punk band The Ex, appearing on their 1995 album Instant and travelling and playing with them on their first tour to Ethiopia.

== Recordings ==
As well as playing with these long-standing groups, Bennink has performed and recorded solo (Tempo Comodo (1982) being among his solo recordings) and played with many free improvisation and free jazz musicians including Derek Bailey, Conny Bauer, Don Cherry and Alexander von Schlippenbach, as well as more conventional jazz musicians such as Lee Konitz. In 1983 he collaborated with boogie-woogie pianist and vocalist Little Willie Littlefield for his album, I'm in the Mood.

== Style ==
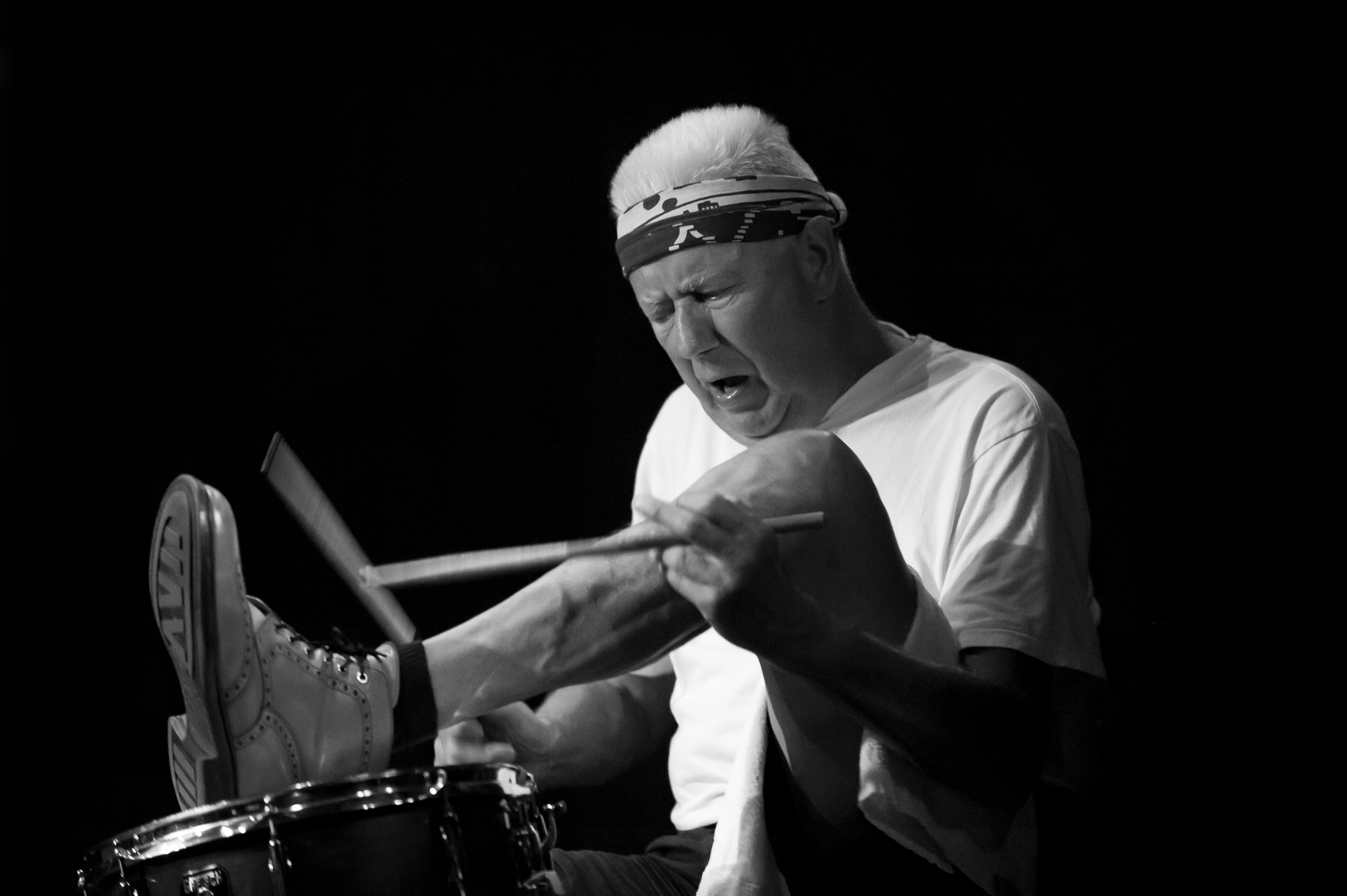
Bennink playing with his foot (2015)

Bennink's style is wide-ranging, running from conventional jazz drumming to highly unconventional free improvisation, for which he often uses whatever found objects happen to be onstage (chairs, music stands, instrument cases), his own body (a favourite device involves putting a drumstick in his mouth and striking it with the other stick), and the entire performance space—the floor, doors, and walls. He makes frequent use of birdcalls and whatever else strikes his fancy (one particularly madcap performance in Toronto in the 1990s involved a deafening fire alarm bell placed on the floor).

== Discography ==
The following is a partial list of recordings by Han Bennink.

=== Solo albums ===
- 1970: Solo (Instant Composers Pool)
- 1973: Nerve Beats (UMS, ALP, Atavistic, 2001)
- 1979: Solo - West/East (FMP)
- 1982: Tempo Comodo (Data Records)

=== Collaborations ===
As leader or co-leader

- 1968: Instant Composers Pool, (Instant Composers Pool), with Misha Mengelberg and John Tchicai
- 1972: Derek Bailey & Han Bennink (Ictus) with Derek Bailey
- 1979: A European Proposal (Live In Cremona) (Horo Records), with Misha Mengelberg, Paul Rutherford and Mario Schiano
- 1996: Serpentine (Songlines Recordings), with Dave Douglas
- 1997: 3 (VIA Jazz), with Michiel Borstlap and Ernst Glerum, reissued in 2004 by 55 Records
- 2000: Jazz Bunker (Golden Years Of New Jazz), with Eugene Chadbourne and Toshinori Kondo
- 2004: Free Touching: Live in Beijing at Keep in Touch (Noise Asia), with Wong Young, Andreas Schreiber, Dennis Rea, Steffen Schorn, and Claudio Puntin
- 2004: Home Safely (Favorite), with Curtis Clark and Ernst Glerum
- 2005: BBG (Favorite), with Michiel Borstlap and Ernst Glerum
- 2007: Amplified Trio (Treader Records), with Spring Heel Jack
- 2008: Monk Volume One (Gramercy Park Music), with Michiel Borstlap and Ernst Glerum
- 2009: Parken (ILK Music), with Joachim Badenhorst, Simon Toldam, and Qarin Wikström
- 2010: Laiv (Bassesferec), with Fabrizio Puglisi and Ernst Glerum

With Ray Anderson and Christy Doran

- 1994: Azurety (hat ART)
- 1995: Cheer Up (hat ART)
- 2011: Who Is in Charge? (Kemo), with Frank Möbus, Ernst Glerum, and Paul van Kemenade

With Gary Bartz, Lee Konitz, Jackie McLean and Charlie Mariano

- 1973: Altissimo (Philips)

With Paul Bley and Annette Peacock

- 1971: Improvisie (America)
- 1972: Dual Unity (Freedom)

With The Blueprint Project

- 2007: People I Like (Creative Nation)

With Anthony Braxton

- 1993: Anthony Braxton's Charlie Parker Project 1993 (HatART, 1995)

With Steve Beresford

- 1987: Directly to Pyjamas (Nato)
- 2002: B + B (Instant Composers Pool)

With Willem Breuker

- 1967: New Acoustic Swing Duo (Instant Composers Pool)

With Eric Dolphy

- 1964: Last Date (Limelight Records)
- 1964: Playing: Epistrophy, June 1, 1964 In Eindhoven, Holland (ICP; includes Misha Mengelberg and Jacques Schols; rehearsal tape for the above concert issued 1975)

With Peter Brötzmann

- 1968: Machine Gun (FMP)
- 1969: Nipples (Calig)
- 1970: Balls (FMP), with Fred Van Hove
- 1973: Brötzmann/Van Hove/Bennink (FMP) with Fred Van Hove, also known as FMP 130
- 1977: Ein Halber Hund Kann Nicht Pinkeln (FMP)
- 1977: Schwarzwaldfahrt (FMP)
- 1979: 3 Points and a Mountain (FMP), with Misha Mengelberg
- 1980: Atsugi Concert (Gua Bungue)
- 2001: Fuck de Boere (Atavistic) recorded in 1968 and 1970
- 2004: Still Quite Popular After All Those Years (BRÖ Records)
- 2006: Total Music Meeting 1977 Berlin (BRÖ Records)
- 2008: In Amherst 2006 (BRÖ Records)

With Eric Boeren

- 2012: Coconut (De Platenbakkerij), with Michael Moore and Wilbert de Joode

With Marion Brown

- 1967: Porto Novo (Freedom)

With Sean Bergin

- 1988: Kid's Mysteries (Nimbus West)

With Uri Caine

- 2013: Sonic Boom (816 Music)

With Eugene Chadbourne

- 2001: 21 Years Later (Train Kept A Rollin') (Leo Records)
- 2005: Chad and Han (House Of Chadula)

With Don Cherry

- 1971: Orient (BYG)
- 1971: Actions (Philips)

With Daniele D'Agaro

- 2003: Strandjutters (hatOLOGY), with Ernst Glerum
- 2010: Fingerprints (Artesuono), with Alexander von Schlippenbach

With Ellery Eskelin

- 1998: Dissonant Characters (hatOLOGY)

With Terrie Ex (and others)

- 2000: The Laughing Owl (Terp Records)
- 2002: Ethiopia Tour 2002 (Not On Label)
- 2006: Transparancy-Wolk 3 (Terp Records), with Rik van Iersel, Bart Maris, and P Jacomyn
- 2007: Zeng! (Terp Records)
- 2010: Let's Go (Terp Records), with Brodie West

With Cor Fuhler and Wilbert De Joode

- 1998: Bellagram (Geestgronden)
- 1998: "Zilch" (ConundromCd)
- 2003: Tinderbox (Data Records)

With Frode Gjerstad

- 2009: Han & Frode (Cadence Jazz Records)

With Kees Hazevoet

- 1978: Calling Down the Flevo Spirit (Snipe Records)

With Will Holshouser and Michael Moore

- 2011: Live In NYC (Ramboy Recordings)

With ICP Orchestra

- 1979: Live in Soncino (Instant Composers Pool, AD LIB)
- 1982: Japan Japon (Instant Composers Pool)
- 1984: Extension Red, White & Blue (Instant Composers Pool)
- 1987: Two Programs: Performs Herbie Nichols and Thelonious Monk (Instant Composers Pool)
- 1990: Bospaadje Konijnehol I (Instant Composers Pool)
- 1991: Bospaadje Konijnehol II (Instant Composers Pool)
- 1997: The Instant Composers Pool 30 Years (Instant Composers Pool)
- 1999: Jubilee Varia (hatOLOGY)
- 2001: Oh, My Dog (Instant Composers Pool)
- 2004: Aan & Uit (Instant Composers Pool)
- 2006: Weer Is Een Dag Voorbij (Instant Composers Pool)
- 2009: Live at the Bimhuis (Instant Composers Pool)
- 2010: !ICP! 50 (Instant Composers Pool)
- 2010: ICP Orchestra (Instant Composers Pool)
- 2014 East of the Sun (Instant Composers Pool)
- 2015: Misha Enzovoort (Instant Composers Pool)
- 2016 Restless in Pieces (Instant Composers Pool)
- 2020 De Hondemepper (Instant Composers Pool)
- 2025 Happy Birthday -> Naar Zee Z.O.Z. (Instant Composers Pool)

With Kazuo Imai

- 2003: Across the Desert (Improvised Music From Japan)

With Mikko Innanen and Jaak Sooäär

- 2006: Spring Odyssey (TUM Records)

With Guus Janssen

- 2005: Groet (Data Records)

With Steve Lacy

- 1978: Lumps (Instant Composers Pool), with Michel Waisvisz and Maarten Van Regteren Altena

With Little Willie Littlefield

- 1983: I'm in the Mood (Oldie Blues)

With Keshavan Maslak

- 1980: Humanplexity (Leo Records), with Misha Mengelberg
- 2008: Bim Huis Live 1st Set (Hum Ha Records)

With Myra Melford

- 1997: Eleven Ghosts (hatOLOGY) recorded 1994

With Misha Mengelberg

- 1971: Instant Composers Pool 010 (Instant Composers Pool)
- 1972: Een Mirakelse Tocht Door Het Scharrebroekse no. 1-6 (Instant Composers Pool)
- 1974: EinePartieTischtennis (FMP, Instant Composers Pool), live
- 1975: Coincidents (Stichting ICP Geluidsdragers, Instant Composers Pool)
- 1978: Midwoud 77 (Instant Composers Pool)
- 1978: Groupcomposing (Instant Composers Pool), with Peter Brötzmann, Evan Parker, Peter Bennink, Paul Rutherford, and Derek Bailey
- 1978: Fragments (Instant Composers Pool), with John Tchicai, and Derek Bailey
- 1982: Bennink Mengelberg (Instant Composers Pool)
- 1985: Change of Season (Music Of Herbie Nichols) (Soul Note), with Steve Lacy, George E. Lewis, and Arjen Gorter
- 1991: Dutch Masters (Soul Note), with Steve Lacy, George Lewis, Ernst Reyseger, and Han Bennink
- 1998: MiHa (Instant Composers Pool)
- 2001: Four in One (Songlines Recordings), with Misha Mengelberg Quartet (Dave Douglas, Brad Jones, Han Bennink)
- 2004: Senne Sing Song (Tzadik)

With Kenny Millions

- 2003: Bootleg (Hum Ha Records)

With Pino Minafra

- 1987: Tropic Of The Mounted Sea Chicken (Splasc(H) Records), with Misha Mengelberg, Michele Lomuto, and Unknown Artist
- 1991: Noci...Strani Frutti (Live At Europa Festival Jazz) (Leo Records), with Ernst Reijseger

With Michael Moore

- 2001: White Widow (Ramboy Recordings), with Alex Maguire and Mark Helias

With Simon Nabatov

- 2003: Chat Room (Leo Records)

With Armen Nalbandian

- 2011: Coup de Grace (Blacksmith Brother)

With Mark O'Leary

- 2008: Television (Ayler Records)

With Evan Parker

- 1970: The Topography of the Lungs (Incus) with Derek Bailey
- 2002: The Grass Is Greener (psi)

With Alessandra Patrucco

- 2006: Circus (Instant Composers Pool), with Tristan Honsinger, Misha Mengelberg, and Ab Baars

With Dudu Pukwana

- 1979: Yi Yole (Instant Composers Pool), with Misha Mengelberg

With Roswell Rudd

- 1983: Regeneration (Soul Note), with Steve Lacy, Kent Carter, and Misha Mengelberg

With Paul Ruys

- 1966: Lover, Come Swing With Me (Philips), with Pim Jacobs, Ruud Jacobs, and Wim Overgaauw

With Manfred Schoof

- 1969: European Echoes (FMP)

With Irene Schweizer

- 1996: Irène Schweizer & Han Bennink (Intakt Records)
- 2015: Welcome Back (Intakt Records)

With Jaak Sooäär

- 2013: Beach Party (Barefoot Records)

With Spring Heel Jack

- 2003: Live (Thirsty Ear), with Matthew Shipp, Evan Parker, J Spaceman, and William Parker

With Aki Takase

- 2011: Two for Two (Intakt Records)

With Cecil Taylor

- 1988: Spots, Circles, and Fantasy (FMP)

With Rik van Iersel

- 2005: Transparancy-Wolk No. 3 (Rikordings)
