= Nerve Beats =

Live album by Han Bennink
- Released: 2001
- Recorded: September 27, 1973
- Venue: Rathaus, Bremen, Germany
- Genre: Free improvisation
- Length: 47:04
- Label: Atavistic; UMS/ALP206CD
- Producer: Peter Schulze, John Corbett

Han Bennink chronology
Jazz Bunker (2000)	Nerve Beats (2001)	21 Years Later (Train Kept a Rollin') (2001)

Nerve Beats is a live solo album by Han Bennink. It was recorded on September 27, 1973, at the Rathaus in Bremen, Germany, for broadcast on Radio Bremen, and was not released until 2001, when it was issued on CD by Atavistic Records as part of their Unheard Music Series. On the album, Bennink is featured on drums, tablas, trombone, clarinet, rhythm machine, and "anything/everything."

== Reception ==
Professional ratings
Review scores
Source	Rating
AllMusic	3/5 stars
The Penguin Guide to Jazz	3/4 stars
Tom Hull – on the Web	B+

In a review for AllMusic, William York wrote: "just because this is a solo album and Bennink is a percussionist doesn't make this a solo percussion album, per se. Along the way, he also sings, yells like a mock karate artist, and rummages through a whole assortment of instruments... this album does a really good job of capturing Bennink's personality and documenting his unique approach to improvisation, and it holds up surprisingly well over repeated listens."

The authors of The Penguin Guide to Jazz Recordings stated that the album "transcends the clichés about period charm and feels vividly alive, although one can only guess what this extraordinary man is doing some of the way."

A reviewer for All About Jazz commented: "Nerve Beats is one of the most spontaneous things Bennink has ever done. It's also the only document in print of his early solo work. An extremely clever drummer, he rapidly develops new ideas and then just as easily discards them for something else... listening to Nerve Beats is like taking a living, breathing voyage through sound."

The Vermont Review's Brian L. Knight remarked: "Bennink saw every surface as a potential beat and he felt every instrument known to man was an instrument worth playing... every song is appropriately titled... Through these moods, Bennink’s inspiration and technical insight is more than apparent."

A writer for Jazz Shelf stated: "it's a natural urge for Han to make noise, and anything will do, as long as he gets to expend effort. The audience is generous with attention, and one can hear from the stereo movement that Han is to and fro on stage... When the trip between stations is too long, he's happy to kneel on the floor and play that, too. Bennink's drumming is better heard on plenty of other group albums, but this solo trip is an amusing one."

Critic Tom Hull wrote: "An amazing drummer, as the cymbal thrash on 'Spooky Drums' more than points out. The title piece moves into another realm with a primitive drum machine serving as backdrop for Bennink's free association on trombone, clarinet, whatever, before he returns to form, banging on anything he can reach."

Writer Todd S. Jenkins noted Bennink's "bizarre sense of humor," and commented: "The vocalizations he uses in ensemble settings to exhort the players on to new heights serve a more cathartic role in his solo shows, like the pressure valve on a water heater relieving a load of pent-up tensions... his deficient attention span spins him around the room."

Seth Watter of Eartrip Magazine remarked: "Nerve Beats... is a defiantly individualistic approach to improvised music that is all the richer for its humour. The only thing of stability is Bennink's distinctive roar: a scream which, every time it appears, draws the entirety of its universe into a black hole from which it emerges purified once more."

== Track listing ==
1. "Bumble Rumble" – 4:21
2. "Spooky Drums" – 26:07
3. "Nerve Beats" – 16:36

== Personnel ==
- Han Bennink – drums, tablas, trombone, clarinet, rhythm machine, anything/everything
