= Archipelago (album) =

Live album by LAND
- Released: 1997
- Recorded: 1996–1997
- Genre: Jazz; Rock; Electronic music World Music
- Length: 62:19
- Label: Periplum
- Producer: Jeff Greinke, Doug Haire

LAND chronology
Land (1995)	Archipelago (1997)	Road Movies (2001)

Archipelago is the second album by the American group Land, who blend jazz, rock, and world music. A May, 1996 concert broadcast formed the basis for most of the album, Archipelago. "Deep", the final track for Archipelago, was recorded in February 1997, with finishing touches completed in July. The album was released on the Periplum label later that year.

Peter Monaghan, writing for Earshot Jazz magazine, describes Archipelago, in part: "LAND, on its second album, continues to construct transporting, otherworldly terrains of rich melody, washes of acoustic and electric sound, and pulsing and jangling rhythm. Add to that fine improv by all band members..."

== Track listing ==
All songs composed by Land

1. Deep - 9:10
2. Motility - 9:59
3. Quake - 7:54
4. Stream - 7:55
5. Hill - 7:27
6. Kata - 6:30
7. Frame - 5:13
8. Tell - 8:11

== Personnel ==
- Jeff Greinke - Keyboards, loops, effects, vocals, producer
- Lesli Dalaba - Percussion, trumpet
- Dennis Rea - Guitars
- George Soler - Stick, loops, effects
- Bill Moyer - Drums, percussion
- Greg Gilmore - Drums, percussion, loops, effects
- Ed Pias - Drums, percussion, vocal sample
- Doug Haire - Engineer
