= Earth Star =

Earth Star may refer to:

- Earth Star Diamond
- Geastrales or earthstar (fungus): species of the genus Geastrum
- Cryptanthus or earth star, a genus in the botanical family Bromeliaceae
- Saturn or earth star
- Earth Star, a character in Toad Patrol

== See also ==
- Earthstar (disambiguation)
