= Shredder Orpheus =

- Directed by: Robert McGinley
- Written by: Robert McGinley
- Produced by: Robert McGinley; Lisanne Dutton; Josh Conescu
- Starring: Robert McGinley; Megan Murphy; Gian-Carlo Scandiuzzi; Vera McCaughan
- Narrated by: Steven Jesse Bernstein
- Cinematography: Erich Volkstorf
- Edited by: Linda Mitchell; Kathy Schickling
- Music by: Roland Barker
- Production companies: Boom! Cult, Inc.
- Distributed by: Image Network Inc.
- Release date: 1989
- Running time: 89 minutes
- Country: United States
- Language: English

Shredder Orpheus is a 1989 film by Robert McGinley that has later become a cult classic, based on the myth of Orpheus and Eurydice. It was Amy Denio's film debut.

== Development ==
The movie was expanded from a previous short, Orpheus and Eurydice, into a feature-length film. Initially wanting to cast others as Orpheus, McGinley was convinced to take the role himself. Shot in Seattle, Washington, a majority of the film's locations were used illegally. The soundtrack was composed by Roland Barker.

== Plot ==
In the Grey Zone, a nebulous post-apocalyptic community built out of shipping containers, Axel (Steven Jesse Bernstein), Scratch (Linda Severt), and Razoreus (Marshall Reid) distract themselves from ennui by skateboarding and listening to the music of Orpheus (Robert McGinley) and his band, the Shredders. On one such night, a mysterious cameraman films Orpheus's lover, Eurydice (Megan Murphy) and takes the footage to Hades (Gian-Carlo Scandiuzzi) and Persephone (Vera McCaughan), the managers of the Euthanasia Broadcast Network, or EBN.

The EBN programming brainwashes and sucks the souls out of the living, where they become part of the network. Needing fresh talent to corner the youth market, Hades sends his goons to murder and kidnap Eurydice at her wedding to Orpheus. Orpheus's manager, Linus (John Billingsley) gives the couple a "Gibsonian Lyre-Axe Guitar" supposedly made by Jimi Hendrix that can unlock new realms of human consciousness. With its power, Orpheus pursues Eurydice's captors through an EBN door.

Inside the EBN, Orpheus meets his parents, Apollo and Calliope, and barely escapes having his memories erased by a magic paper shredder that shreds the minds of incoming souls. Persephone takes an interest in Orpheus's arrival and helps him confront Hades on-air, and Orpheus's resulting performance convinces Hades to turn his quest into a ratings stunt: he'll let Orpheus and Eurydice go as long as he doesn't look back until they're both out. Due to Scratch calling her name, Orpheus turns around before Eurydice's fully out, and she's sent back to the EBN.

One year later, the EBN enjoys high ratings, while Orpheus has become a celebrity and drowns his sorrows in music and skateboarding. He has entered a depression over missing Eurydice, who has become a dancer for the network, and Linus and the others cover for missing gigs and have to remind him to eat. Orpheus's interest is piqued when Axel's gang mentions a gate to the underworld in a mysterious parking garage no one has successfully skated before, but when Linus suggests a tarot reading from an oracle, she cautions him against unnecessary risks. Meanwhile, Persephone wants Orpheus back on-air to encourage a better performance from Eurydice, and the EBN sends Orpheus a magic skateboard that lets him navigate the hellish parking garage.

Orpheus confronts Hades and is given another chance to save Eurydice in the form of a game show; one door leads to Eurydice, while the other leads to his death. Orpheus accepts the challenge, but unbeknownst to him, Eurydice is locked in her dressing room and thus neither door is correct. Upon choosing the wrong door, the Furies decapitate Orpheus with a chainsaw, and, in a moment staged by the EBN, Eurydice reunites with Orpheus in death. Hades and Persephone exult over the spectacle, while Orpheus's head is recovered by Razoreus. After a failed attempt to break into the garage, Axel and his gang strike against the EBN by blowing up one of their satellite dishes. The youth of the Grey Zone begin to look up to Orpheus, using his skull and music for skateboarding rituals. Axel expresses hope that one day they'll realize he risked everything, even himself, for love.

== Cast ==
- Robert McGinley as Orpheus
- Megan Murphy as Eurydice
- Steven Jesse Bernstein as Axel
- Linda Severt as Scratch
- Marshall Reid as Razoreus
- Gian-Carlo Scandiuzzi as Hades
- Vera McCaughan as Persephone
- John Billingsley as Linus
- Brian Faker as EBN Producer
- Whitey Shapiro as Apollo
- Barb Benedetti as Calliope
- Gypsy Mandelbaum as Oracle
- Oscar Knudsen as Cerberus
- Tex Germany as Minister
- Cindy Kelly, Deborah Labounty, Lahly Poore, and Deborah Sabin as the Furies

== Release ==
=== Film festival ===
The film was shown at BAM Rose Cinemas on September 23, 2013. It was later shown again at The Brattle Theater in Cambridge, Massachusetts as part of the theater's "Trash Night" on May 19, 2015.

=== Soundtrack ===
On November 11, 2014, the film's remastered soundtrack was released on vinyl by Light in the Attic Records under its Traction imprint. The music was composed by Roland Barker, Bill Rieflin, Dennis Rea, and Amy Denio. It is the only release of the soundtrack. The vinyl includes 17 songs and comes bundled with a Shredder Orpheus DVD.

=== Anniversary Blu-Ray ===
For the film's 34th anniversary, a limited edition Blu-Ray was released by Vinegar Syndrome and American Genre Film Archive that restored the entire uncut film from the original elements. Special features include audio commentary, behind-the-scenes photos, the original VHS version, trailers and promos, writings on the myth, and subtitles.

=== Novelization ===
The film received an official novelization from Encyclopocalypse Publications in April 2025 that added scenes from an earlier draft script in addition to the finished film.

== Reception ==
Nathan Phillips, writing for The Movie Elite said, "Shredder Orpheus is a love letter to independent artistry and ’80s counterculture that is, frankly, missing or underrepresented in today’s social climate, and if it were possible to be nostalgic about the future, it would be via the attitudes present in the future as seen in Shredder Orpheus, a blast from the past.".

Tony Kay, writing for City Arts Magazine, said "Shredder Orpheus is an animal all its own. Written by, directed by and starring On the Boards co-founder Robert McGinley, it was a complete anomaly during its initial 1989 release—an all-local feature film made back when Seattle was still considered a backwater town by most of the world (grunge and the dotcom boom were still gleams in the city’s collective eye). Within this isolated Petri dish, McGinley enlisted a ragtag cast and crew of artists and creatives to put a unique spin on the Greek myth of Orpheus and Eurydice. Two decades later, the results remain a kick to watch."

The cinephile blog House of Self-Indulgence said "Sure, the film looks like a veiled excuse to film people doing skateboard tricks in a dystopian landscape ruled by a sinister television station, but it has a lot to say about mass media, the afterlife, love, youth culture and corporate mind control."
