= Road Movies (album) =

Studio album by LAND
- Released: 2001
- Recorded: 1998–1999
- Genre: Jazz rock, electronic
- Length: 48:04
- Label: First World Music
- Producer: LAND

LAND chronology
Archipelago (1997)	Road Movies (2001)

Road Movies is the third and final album by the American group Land. Road Movies was recorded between June, 1998 & February, 1999 at Jack Straw Productions in Seattle and was released on February 13, 2001 on the First World Music label. It was named one of the Top Ten releases of 2001 by Pulse! (Instrumental/Ambient) and the Seattle Weekly (Jazz).

By the time the recording of Road Movies began in 1998, Land had gone through a number of personnel changes and had developed a much harder edged sound. Guitarist Dennis Rea, interviewed at the time, is quoted: "The current lineup is more of a 'rock' band than earlier editions, and is much more explosive and in-your-face. Our connection with ambient music is pretty tenuous at this point." Amazon.com's editorial review describes the album: "Road Movies is a collection of nine compositions primarily recorded live in the studio. It is the first release featuring the powerful rhythm section of Bill Rieflin and Fred Chalenor who lend a more propulsive, focused, and dynamic element to the group. Hence, Road Movies is sometimes intense, other times playful, often beautiful, and always a fascinating listening experience."

== Track listing ==
1. Tyrone - 5:21
2. Magnesium - 4:22
3. Rink - 4:54
4. Frolic - 6:08
5. Winnebago Weekend - 7:07
6. Vespa - 3:50
7. Strife - 5:35
8. Flagpole - 4:33
9. Sauce - 6:14

== Personnel ==
- Fred Chalenor - Bass
- Lesli Dalaba - Trumpet
- Jeff Greinke - Sounds & rhythm
- Dennis Rea - Guitar
- Bill Rieflin - Drums
- Doug Haire - Engineer
