= Still Quite Popular After All Those Years =

Studio album by Peter Brötzmann and Han Bennink
- Released: 2004
- Recorded: February 4 and 5, 2004
- Studio: The Loft, Cologne, Germany
- Genre: Free improvisation
- Label: Brö; Brö 4
- Producer: Peter Brötzmann, Michael Ehlers

Peter Brötzmann chronology
Signs (2004)	Still Quite Popular After All Those Years (2004)	Tales Out of Time (2004)

Still Quite Popular After All Those Years is an album by saxophonist and clarinetist Peter Brötzmann and drummer Han Bennink. It was recorded on February 4 and 5, 2004, at the Loft in Cologne, Germany, and was released on vinyl in limited quantities later that year by Brötzmann's Brö label, which was revived in 2002 thanks to a partnership with Eremite Records.

== Reception ==
In a review for All About Jazz, Andrey Henkin wrote: "Despite what promises to be an LP... of bombast, the results across six brief tracks are more English in their approach. Brötzmann is heard to great effect on clarinet and Bennink interchanges light rumbles with startling punctuations. These two bring out the best in each other."

One Final Note's Jay Collins stated that the music "splatters color, intertwines attuned thoughts, and spews a controlled intensity," and commented: "Full of audacity and charm, these masters show that while they might not wrestle as much as they did decades before, their art now has a refined sense of purpose, while maintaining the vigor, unpredictability, and fun after all these years."

Dan Warburton of Paris Transatlantic remarked: "Though neither can be said to have 'mellowed' with age, there's real depth and maturity in these superbly-recorded 2004 performances... and Bennink also brings a playfulness too often lacking in Brötzmann's vein-bursting blowouts, tapping out mad Morse code messages on a drumstick jammed into the inside of his cheek and humming a tune by his (and Brötz's) old pal Misha Mengelberg at the same time."

Writing for Coda, Stuart Broomer noted the "palpable humanity of the music," which illustrates "a consistent conversational intimacy between these two senior masters of free jazz, European chapter." He stated: "Brötzmann plays clarinet on half of the six tracks, with a warm vocal sonority that leaps out of the grooves, while Bennink matches and feeds his impassioned discourse."

In an article for Arthur, Byron Coley and Thurston Moore commented: "the combination of reed explosion and drum explansion is as monumental as ever... Just brilliant all around."

== Track listing ==
1. "No 1 - Clarinet/Drums" – 8:42
2. "No 2 - Tarogato/Drums" – 6:18
3. "No 3 - Clarinet/Drums" – 4:23
4. "No 4 - Clarinet/Drums" – 5:35
5. "No 5 - Alto/Drums" – 8:18
6. "No 6 - Tenor/Drums" – 5:52

== Personnel ==
- Peter Brötzmann – A clarinet, tárogató, alto saxophone, tenor saxophone
- Han Bennink – drums, voice
