= Dennis Rea =

American musician (born 1957)

- Born: July 7, 1957 (age 67); Utica, New York, U.S.
- Origin: Chicago, Illinois, U.S.
- Genres: Jazz rock, experimental rock, art rock, electronic rock, folk rock, progressive rock, ambient music
- Occupation(s): Musician, writer, event organizer
- Instrument(s): Guitar, piano, Chorded zither, kalimba
- Years active: 1977–present
- Labels: Moontower, Sky, China Record Company, Soundtrack Boulevard, First World, Infrasound, HipSync, Prudence, Periplum, Extreme, Linden, Palace of Lights, Noise Asia, Materiali Sonori, Moonjune
- Website: dennisrea.com

Dennis Rea (born July 7, 1957) is an American guitarist, author, and music event organizer. He was a member of the electronic rock group Earthstar in the late 1970s and early 1980s. He leads the progressive rock quintet Moraine and worked with Jeff Greinke in Land. Other significant involvements have included Flame Tree, Identity Crisis, Iron Kim Style, Savant, Stackpole, Tempered Steel, and Zhongyu.

Rea has collaborated with Hector Zazou, Bill Rieflin and Trey Gunn of King Crimson, Hawkwind cofounder Nik Turner, Chinese rock musician Cui Jian, drummer Han Bennink, Tuvan throat singers Albert Kuvezin and Saylik Ommun, and Mexican experimental duo Cabezas de Cera. He has appeared on more than 40 recordings to date on labels including MoonJune, Sky, RVNG Intl., Light in the Attic, First World, Extreme, C/Z, Purple Pyramid, Materiali Sonori, and Palace of Lights. He has performed throughout the U.S. and in China, Russia, Tuva, Germany, the UK, Taiwan, and Mexico.

In the late 1980s and early 1990s, Rea collaborated with many notable Chinese musicians. He was one of the first Western musicians to record an album for the state-owned China Record Corporation.

His activities in East Asia are detailed in his book Live at the Forbidden City: Musical Encounters in China and Taiwan. He is a co-organizer of the annual Seaprog festival and several concert series. For more than a decade he helped organize the Seattle Improvised Music Festival.

== Early years ==
Rea was motivated to start playing guitar at the age of nine or ten by Mike Nesmith of The Monkees. Two albums that had a big impact on him were In the Court of the Crimson King by King Crimson and the soundtrack for 2001: A Space Odyssey by György Ligeti.

Other influences include Soft Machine, Gentle Giant, Henry Cow, Miles Davis, John Coltrane, AACM, Mahavishnu Orchestra, Oregon, John Cage, Karlheinz Stockhausen, and Morton Subotnick. As a guitarist, his influences include John Abercrombie, Larry Coryell, Jimi Hendrix, John McLaughlin, Terje Rypdal, and Ralph Towner. His musical career began in the early 1970s when he formed the progressive-rock group Zuir in his hometown of Utica, New York.

== Career ==
In the late 1970s Rea recorded in Germany with Earthstar, a band formed by keyboardist Craig Wuest. Influenced by the German electronic music of the 1970s such as Tangerine Dream, Harmonia, Popol Vuh, and Klaus Schulze (who would later produce the group's 1978 album French Skyline), Earthstar consisted of members of Wuest, Zuir, and other musicians in Utica. In 1977 Earthstar signed with Moontower Records in Nashville. Moontower released the band's first album Salterbarty Tales during the following year. With Schulze's encouragement, Wuest moved to Germany in 1978 and recorded French Skyline and Atomkraft? Nein, Danke! for Sky Records in Hamburg. Rea joined Wuest and other members of Earthstar in Germany in 1979 and 1980 for sessions at Schulze's IC Studio and appeared on both releases. Earthstar participated in the German Kosmische Musik electronic music scene.

In the early 1980s Rea collaborated with composer K. Leimer in his experimental band Savant, which was described by Philip Sherburne in Pitchfork as "some of the most striking and original American electronic music of that period." Beginning in 1983 he lived in New York City for three years and was involved with the Downtown music scene. Returning to Seattle in the late 1980s, he performed with avant-rock bands (notably Color Anxiety and Fred) and became involved in free improvisation with Wally Shoup, Bill Horist, and Stuart Dempster. In 1988 he helped organize the first Seattle Improvised Music Festival. During the same year, he served as the title character's "sonic alter ego" in the film Shredder Orpheus.

Between 1989 and 1996 Rea spent several years in China and Taiwan, playing over 100 concerts at cultural centers, universities, conservatories, expatriate bars, religious celebrations, on radio, television, and in sports arenas with the Chinese pop star Zhang Xing. His 1990 solo album Shadow in Dreams for the state-run China Record Corporation sold 40,000 copies and was cited among the year's ten best releases by Party organ China Youth Daily. While abroad he organized three unofficial concert tours of China by progressive Western bands (Identity Crisis, The Vagaries, and Land), playing more than 40 concerts in Beijing, Chengdu, Chongqing, Kunming, Guangzhou, Hong Kong, and Macau, plus a performance at the 1991 Sichuan China International TV Festival viewed by a TV audience estimated in the hundreds of millions. He has performed with Cui Jian, Wang Yong, Liu Yuan, Liang Heping, He Yong, ADO, and Cobra. He has written about Chinese and other Asian music in CHIME, the Routledge Encyclopedia of Contemporary Chinese Culture, and the Routledge History of Social Protest in Popular Music. His adventures as a foreign musician in the Far East are chronicled in his memoir Live at the Forbidden City: Musical Encounters in China and Taiwan.

Returning to Seattle in the mid-1990s, Rea worked with Land, formed by Jeff Greinke, a musician Rea met in Seattle in the early 1980s. The band has included trumpeter Lesli Dalaba, bassist Fred Chalenor, drummers Bill Rieflin and Greg Gilmore, and Chapman stick player George Soler. Between 1998 and 2001 Rea led the free-jazz quartet Stackpole, which won a Golden Ear award from Earshot Jazz magazine for Best Northwest Outside Jazz Group in 2000. For ten years he contributed to bands led by singer-songwriter Eric Apoe.

For MoonJune he has recorded albums with Moraine, the free-jazz band Iron Kim Style, and Jon Davis's band Zhongyu. Moonjune released his solo album Views from Chicheng Precipice, an unorthodox take on the traditional music of East Asia, and Giant Steppes, a similar treatment of Central Asian music. He has worked with Ffej and Frank Junk in the trio Tempered Steel, with Hawkwind founder Nik Turner and drummer Jack Gold-Molina in Flame Tree, and in his Tanabata Ensemble. Rea has toured in Russia (chronicled in his book Tuva and Busted [Blue Ear Books, 2021]) and Taiwan and has performed in England, Germany, and Mexico. With several partners, he founded the Seaprog festival for progressive rock and avant rock and the Zero-G Concert Series. Both take place in Seattle.

Rea's ongoing involvements as of 2024 include Moraine, Vaalbara, Reaven Trio, Tempered Steel, Threshold Quartet, Ben McAllister's Guitar Cult, and solo acoustic performances.

== Awards and honors ==
Rea has been awarded grants for his musical activities by the U.S. Department of State (Fulbright-Hays program), Arts International Fund for U.S. Artists Abroad, Seattle Arts Commission, King County Arts Commission, Malcolm S. Morse Foundation, Jack Straw Foundation, and the Washington State China Relations Council.

== Discography ==
=== As leader or co-leader ===
- 1990: Shadow in Dreams
- 2004: Free Touching: Live in Beijing at Keep in Touch with Han Bennink, Wang Yong, Andreas Schreiber, Steffen Schorn, Claudio Puntin, Lesli Dalaba
- 2010: Views from Chicheng Precipice (Moonjune)
- 2012: Subduction Zone with Wally Shoup and Tom Zgonc
- 2016: Black River Transect: Dennis Rea Tanabata Ensemble in Concert
- 2021: Giant Steppes (Moonjune)

=== As sideman ===
With Alex's Hand

- 2014: Alex's Hand Presents: The Roaches

With Eric Apoe

- 1996: Songs of Love and Doom
- 2000: Dream Asylum
- 2002: Radioation
- 2005: Book of Puzzles
- 2008: The Man in the Sun
- 2019: Lost in Oddball Alley
- 2021: Some Kinda Good News
- 2024: Spectator

With Axolotl

- 2024: Flight of the Grackle: Live at I-Spy 7.24.2000

With Roland Barker, Amy Denio, and Bill Rieflin

- 2014: Shredder Orpheus Soundtrack

With Marc Barreca

- 1983, 2016: Music Works for Industry

With Chekov

- 2008: Born to be Quiet
- 2024: Breakfast in Euphonia?

With Peter Comley Sedna Ensemble

- 2021: Sedna

With the Jim Cutler Jazz Orchestra

- 2014: Gimme Some Sugar, Baby!

With Earthstar

- 1978: Salterbarty Tales
- 1979: French Skyline
- 1981: Atomkraft? Nein, Danke!
- 2024: Sleeper, the Nightlifer
- 2024: Collected Works

With Roberto Fedriga

- 2024: La Mia Malattia

With Flame Tree

- 2016: Flame Tree

With Craig Flory and Doug Haire

- 1998: Wigwam Bendix

With Jeff Greinke

- 1994: Big Weather
- 1998: Swimming
- 2013: Scenes from a Train

With Doug Haire

- 1992: Locale

With Identity Crisis

- 2021: Banished Souls: The Lost 1991 China Record Company Sessions
- 2021: Rogue Province: The Lost 1991 Taipei Sessions

With Iron Kim Style

- 2010: Iron Kim Style

With Land

- 1995: Land
- 1997: Archipelago
- 2001: Road Movies

With Moraine

- 2009: Manifest Density
- 2011: Metamorphic Rock
- 2014: Groundswell

With Ed Petry

- 2021: Duwamps Duets: Ed Petry Remembered

With Red Fable

- 2021: Red Fable

With Savant

- 1983: The Neo-Realist (At Risk)
- 2016: Artificial Dance

With Wally Shoup

- 2024: briefcase featuring Wally Shoup
- 2024: Wally Shoup 2x4tet

With Stackpole

- 2001: Stackpole

With Tempered Steel

- 2012: Tempered Steel

With Threshold

- 2024: Threshold

With Ting Bu Dong

- 2008: Ting Bu Dong

With Rik Wright

- 2000: Bleeding Laughter

With Hector Zazou

- 2003: Strong Currents

With Zhongyu

- 2016: Zhongyu
