= Birotron =

Electro-mechanical musical instrument

The Birotron is an electro-mechanical musical instrument designed as a successor to the similar Mellotron, and financed by Rick Wakeman.

== Features ==
The Birotron was named after its inventor, Dave Biro, and developed with investment from regular Mellotron player Rick Wakeman. Like the Mellotron, the instrument produced sounds from magnetic tape, but it used eight-track tape in a loop. As such tapes never need rewinding, this avoided the problem that the Mellotron had, where a sound would stop playing after around eight seconds.

The instrument has 37 keys and features 19 eight-track cartridges. Tapes could be easily exchanged or replaced, and it was intended that musicians could add their own recordings to the instrument.

== Production ==
Biro first started designing a tape-replay instrument in 1974 after hearing Wakeman play the Mellotron on Tales from Topographic Oceans by Yes. He used the keyboard from an old piano and parts from a local hardware store, plus a set of automotive eight-track decks from a junkyard. Biro built the prototype in his father's garage with "no plans, no drawings. nothing. All I remember is that absolutely no one thought it could work". Despite several faults, Biro persuaded Wakeman to financially invest in the instrument after meeting him backstage at a concert later that year. As part of the deal, Wakeman retained full rights with an offer of compensation to Biro should the instrument become successful. Development progressed in 1975, when Wakeman had Biro produce a working model with help from his technicians at his factory and rehearsal facility in High Wycombe, England.

The Birotron was announced in September 1975 and marketed by Complex 7, a group of companies that Wakeman directed to help build and market the instrument. Advance orders came from John Lennon, Paul McCartney, Keith Emerson, John Paul Jones and Elton John. Wakeman used the instrument on his solo album Criminal Record and on Yes's Tormato.

In late 1978, Wakeman said that between 30 and 35 unfinished models had been built, and the instrument performed to his satisfaction in a studio setting, but problems arose when it was used on tour with Yes a year prior. Its precise voltage requirements made it unsuitable for use in countries outside the UK, and a decision had yet to be made to either produce several models to work on different voltages, or add a built-in transformer. Wakeman said a key problem was that the instrument had "teething problems" that did not bother him, but would be unacceptable to the general public. A further problem was the increasing popularity of string synthesizers, which could reproduce a similar sound without any mechanical issues. Ultimately, few models were manufactured and the instrument never entered regular production. Wakeman later said he lost around £50,000 in the investment.

The only musicians other than Wakeman to have received a Birotron are Tangerine Dream (who bought two), Klaus Schulze and Tom Rhea. As of 2019, only two working models are known to exist.
