= Nous Autres =

Live album by Fred Frith and René Lussier
- Released: 1987
- Recorded: October and December 1986; January 1992 (CD bonus tracks)
- Venue: 4th Victoriaville Festival, Quebec, Canada
- Studio: Sorcerer Sound Studio, New York City (CD bonus tracks)
- Genre: Avant-rock
- Length: 43:25
- Language: French, German, Japanese
- Label: Victo (Canada)
- Producer: Michel Levasseur

Fred Frith chronology
Who Needs Enemies? (1983)	Nous Autres (1987)	The Technology of Tears (1988)

Nous Autres (Quebec French for "We") is a live album by Fred Frith and René Lussier recorded in October 1986 at the 4th Festival International de Musique Actuelle de Victoriaville in Victoriaville, Quebec, Canada. The live mixes were later enhanced with additional material recorded by Frith and Lussier in December 1986 at a studio in Montreal, Quebec, and the resulting album was released on LP in 1987. The album was released on CD in 1992 with four additional studio tracks recorded by Frith and Lussier in January 1992 in New York City.

Three guest vocalists, Tenko Ueno, Geneviève Letarte and Christoph Anders sing on four of the album tracks in Japanese, French and German respectively. The LP release included a record sleeve insert with the lyrics in the original languages and translations to French and English.

Nous Autres was Frith and Lussier's first collaborative recording and its success introduced Lussier, at the time not well known outside Quebec, to an international audience.

== Background ==
French experimental guitarist/composer René Lussier from Quebec, Canada had performed at the first three Victoriaville festivals, and for the fourth, festival artistic director Michel Levasseur suggested that Lussier play in a duo concert with English experimental guitarist/composer Fred Frith from Henry Cow. Henry Cow and the Rock in Opposition movement (initiated by Henry Cow) had been a big influence on Lussier, and he seized the opportunity to perform with Frith.

Also performing at this 4th Victoriaville festival was Cassiber, and two of its members, Chris Cutler (ex-Henry Cow) and Christoph Anders performed on two of the album's tracks, "Cage de Verre" and "J'Aime la Musique" respectively. An altered form of "J'Aime la Musique" was later frequently performed by Cassiber and appeared on their 1990 album, A Face We All Know.

The success of this concert prompted a number of future collaborations between Frith and Lussier:

- Frith played on Lussier's solo album, Le Trésor de la Langue (1989);
- Lussier played on two of Frith's solo albums, Quartets (1994) and Stone, Brick, Glass, Wood, Wire (1999);
- Lussier was a member of two of Frith's bands, Keep the Dog (1989–1991) and the Fred Frith Guitar Quartet (1989–1999), and played on all their albums;
- Lussier featured prominently in a documentary film on Frith, Step Across the Border (1990) and the accompanying soundtrack, Step Across the Border (1990).

== Content and reception ==
Professional ratings
Review scores
Source	Rating
AllMusic	4.5/5 stars

Most of the tracks on Nous Autres are instrumental and focus on Fred Frith and René Lussier's guitar and bass guitar playing. Four vocal tracks, "Ketsui", "Iceberg", "J'aime la Musique" and "Domaine Revisited" include lyrics written and sung by the three guest vocalists, Tenko Ueno, Geneviève Letarte and Christoph Anders in their own languages. "Domaine Revisited" was derived from an instrumental "Domaine de Planousset" on Frith's solo album, Speechless (1981) and includes singing (in French) by Letarte.

AllMusic wrote that, "Fans of Frith will find much to love here, and will be equally impressed by Lussier, whose slightly more rockish approach nicely counterbalances Frith's more abstract tendencies ... Wonderful stuff."

== Track listing ==
=== LP release ===
Side A

1. "Cage de Verre" (Lussier) – 3:38
2. "The Same Wide Wall" (Frith) – 3:19
3. "Ketsui (Determination)" (Frith, Lussier, Ueno) – 5:02
4. "Plaisirs Instantanés" (Lussier) – 2:52
5. "Iceberg" (Lussier, Letarte) – 6:03
6. "Solo en Ré Mineur" (Frith) – 1:26

Side B

1. "De Mémoire" (Lussier) – 1:33
2. "Two Squares and Three Circles" (Frith, Lussier, Cora) – 6:29
3. "Cage de Fer" (Frith) – 2:08
4. "J'Aime la Musique" (Lussier, Anders) – 5:00
5. "Domaine Revisited" (Frith, Letarte) – 3:41
6. "Riaville Bump" (Lussier, Morton) – 2:14

=== CD release ===
1. "Cage de Verre" (Lussier) – 3:38
2. "The Same Wide Wall" (Frith) – 3:19
3. "Vinegar Minutes" (Frith, Lussier) – 1:42 ♯
4. "Ketsui (Determination)" (Frith, Lussier, Ueno) – 5:02
5. "Plaisirs Instantanés" (Lussier) – 2:52
6. "Fun in America" (Frith, Lussier) – 2:12 ♯
7. "Iceberg" (Lussier, Letarte) – 6:03
8. "Solo en Ré Mineur" (Frith) – 1:26
9. "De Mémoire" (Lussier) – 1:33
10. "Two Squares and Three Circles" (Frith, Lussier, Cora) – 6:29
11. "Assuming They're Human" (Frith, Lussier) – 2:49 ♯
12. "Cage de Fer" (Frith) – 2:08
13. "J'aime la Musique" (Lussier, Anders) – 5:00
14. "Une Poignée de Clous" (Frith, Lussier) – 1:53 ♯
15. "Domaine Revisited" (Frith, Letarte) – 3:41
16. "Riaville Bump" (Lussier, Morton) – 2:14

♯ denotes bonus tracks

== Personnel ==
- Fred Frith – guitar, bass guitar, drums, violin, piano, voice, rhythm box
- René Lussier – guitar, percussions, bass guitar, voice, tapes

=== Guests ===
- Chris Cutler – percussion (hammer, sticks and paint cans) on "Cage de Verre"
- Tenko Ueno – voice (Japanese) on "Ketsui"
- Geneviève Letarte – voice (French) on "Iceberg" and "Domaine Revisited"
- Christoph Anders – voice (German) and tapes on "J'aime la Musique"

=== Production ===
- Original LP recorded on 4 October 1986 live at the 4th Festival International de Musique Actuelle de Victoriaville in Victoriaville and on 21–24 December 1986 at Studio Victor, Montreal, Quebec
- Additional CD tracks recorded at Sorcerer Sound Studio, New York City on 6 January 1992
- Arranged by Fred Frith and René Lussier, except "Cage de Verre", by Fred Frith, René Lussier and Chris Cutler
- Produced by Michel Levasseur
- Photography by Sylvain Lafleur
- Artwork by François Bienvenue
