= Quartets (Fred Frith album) =

Studio album by Fred Frith
- Released: 1994
- Recorded: April 1992, New York City; December 1992, London
- Genre: Modern classical
- Length: 52:47
- Label: RecRec (Switzerland)
- Producer: Fred Frith

Fred Frith chronology
Helter Skelter (1992)	Quartets (1994)	Live in Trondheim, Berlin & Limoges, Vol. 2 (1994)

Quartets is a 1994 studio album by English guitarist, composer and improvisor Fred Frith. It consists of two compositions by Frith, "Lelekovice, String Quartet #1", performed by the Violet Wires String Quartet, and "The As Usual Dance Towards the Other Flight to What is Not", performed by an electric guitar quartet. Frith performs with the guitar quartet, but not with the string quartet.

== Background ==
"Lelekovice, String Quartet #1" was composed by Frith in 1990 and was dedicated to Iva Bittová, Lelekovice being the name of the village near Brno in the Czech Republic where Bittová lives. It was first performed in July 1991 by the Mondriaan Quartet at the Nieuwe Muziek Festival, in Middelburg, the Netherlands, and was used by the United States choreographer Amanda Miller in her dance piece, My Father's Vertigo in 1991. The recording on this album was made in December 1992 by the Violet Wires String Quartet at Angel Recording Studios, London. "Lelekovice" was recorded again in June 2003 by the Arditti Quartet and appeared on Frith's 2005 album, Eleventh Hour.

"The As Usual Dance Towards the Other Flight to What is Not" was commissioned by Roulette, New York City and composed by Frith in 1989. It consists of eight movements labeled A to H, and can be performed in any sequence. For this recording, the order is D, B, C, G, H, F, A, E. The title "The As Usual Dance ..." is taken from a letter written by Anne Hemenway. The piece was first performed in February 1989 by Les 4 Guitaristes de l'Apocalypso-Bar at The Kitchen, New York City, and recorded by the same group in February 1989 at Studio Victor, Montreal. An album of this piece and other recordings by the group were released on Fin de Siecle (1989). Only sections A and C of this composition appear on the album.

Frith did not play on "The As Usual Dance Towards the Other Flight to What is Not" with Les 4 Guitaristes de l'Apocalypso-Bar, and when he wanted to perform this piece himself, he assembled an electric guitar quartet in 1992, comprising René Lussier, Nick Didkovsky, Mark Howell and himself. The quartet recorded the complete piece in April 1992 at Sorcerer Sound, New York, releasing it on Quartets. Later Mark Stewart replaced Howell and the new quartet became known as the Fred Frith Guitar Quartet, touring internationally and recording two albums, Ayaya Moses (1997) and Upbeat (1999).

Parts of "The As Usual Dance Towards the Other Flight to What is Not" also appear in the documentary film, Step Across the Border (1990), and its soundtrack, Step Across the Border (1990), performed by an electric guitar quartet which Frith conducts.

== Track listing ==
All tracks composed by Fred Frith.

"Lelekovice, String Quartet #1 (for Iva Bittová)"
No.	Title	Length
1.	Untitled	1:57
2.	Untitled	3:34
3.	Untitled	0:49
4.	Untitled	3:12
5.	Untitled	1:52
6.	Untitled	4:11
7.	Untitled	3:29
8.	Untitled	1:05
9.	Untitled	2:33
Total length:		24:12

"The As Usual Dance Towards the Other Flight to What is Not"
No.	Title	Length
1.	"D"	3:41
2.	"B"	2:37
3.	"C"	2:17
4.	"G"	2:02
5.	"H"	3:03
6.	"F"	2:33
7.	"A"	6:45
8.	"E"	5:37
Total length:		28:35

== Personnel ==
"Lelekovice, String Quartet #1" performed by Violet Wires String Quartet:

- Ann Morfee – violin
- Abigail Brown – violin
- Phil D'Arcy – viola
- Liz Parker – cello

"The As Usual Dance Towards the Other Flight to What is Not" performed by Electric Guitar Quartet:

- Fred Frith – guitar
- René Lussier – guitar
- Nick Didkovsky – guitar
- Mark Howell – guitar

=== Production ===
- "Lelekovice, String Quartet #1"
  - Recorded in December 1992 at Angel Recording Studios, London by Tom Leader
  - Mixed in January 1993 at Sound Fabrik, Munich by Benedykt Grodon and Fred Frith
- "The As Usual Dance Towards the Other Flight to What is Not"
  - Recorded and mixed in April 1992 at Sorcerer Sound, New York City by David Avidor
- Artwork by Peter Bäder
