= André Duchesne (musician) =

Canadian experimental guitarist and composer

- Born: 1949 (age 76–77); Montreal, Quebec, Canada
- Genres: Experimental music, contemporary classical
- Occupations: Musician, composer
- Instrument: Guitar
- Years active: mid-1970s – present
- Label: Ambiances Magnétiques

André Duchesne (born 1949) is a Canadian experimental music guitarist and composer. He was a co-founder of Ambiances Magnétiques, a Canadian musical collective and record label, and formed several experimental music bands, including Conventum, Les 4 Guitaristes de l'Apocalypso-Bar and Locomotive. Duchesne has also released five solo albums.

== Biography ==
André Duchesne was born in Montreal, Quebec in 1949. As a teenager he learnt acoustic guitar, but was not satisfied with the popular rock music being played at the time. In the mid-1970s he formed an avant-garde folk-rock group called Conventum with René Lussier, Jean Derome, Jean-Pierre Bouchard, Jacques Laurin, Bernard Cormier and poet Alain-Arthur Painchaud. Conventum was described by AllMusic as a mixture of "Quebec's folk roots with absurd poetry and progressive arrangements". They released two albums, À l'Affût d'un Complot in 1977 and Le Bureau Central des Utopies in 1979.

In 1983 Duchesne, Lussier, Derome and Robert M. Lepage formed Ambiances Magnétiques, a musical collective and artist-run record label specialising in avant-garde music. Duchesne released his first solo album, Le Temps des Bombes on the new label in 1984. Then he began writing contrapuntal compositions for a guitar quartet, and formed Les 4 Guitaristes de l'Apocalypso-Bar (The 4 Guitarists of the Apocalypso-Bar) with Lussier, Bouchard and Roger Boudreault to perform the pieces. Les 4 Guitaristes de l'Apocalypso-Bar was a concept band that Duchesne said was from post-apocalypse Canada "inspired by the ghost of Jimi Hendrix". They premiered at the 4th Festival International de Musique Actuelle de Victoriaville (FIMAV) at Victoriaville, Quebec in October 1986, and continued until 1989, touring Canada, the United States and Europe. They also released two albums in 1987 and 1989.

After the success of Les 4 Guitaristes de l'Apocalypso-Bar, Duchesne returned to FIMAV in 1989 to premier "his most ambitious work ever", L' Ou 'L, a composition that explored different styles of chamber music. In 1991, he formed Locomotive with Claude Fradette and Rémi Leclerc, which also performed at FIMAV in 1991. Locomotive recorded an album of the same name in 1992, which AllMusic called "the pinnacle of André Duchesne's discography".

During the mid- to late-1990s, Duchesne formed several rock bands, but they never recorded. In 1999 he released Réflexions, an album of classical guitar solos, and in 2001, Polaroïde, a free improvisation session for guitar, viola and percussion. Duchesne returned to FIMAV for its 21st edition in 2004 to premier Cordes à danser, a new project of his featuring a string quartet and a "power trio" of guitar, bass and drums.

== Discography ==
- Le Temps Des Bombes (1984)
- Le Royaume Ou L'Asile (Ambiances Magnetiques, 1990)
- L'Ou'L (Les Disques Victo, 1990)
- Locomotive (Ambiances Magnetiques, 1993)
- Reflexions (Ambiances Magnetiques, 1999)
- Polaroide (Ambiances Magnetiques, 2001)
- Arreter Les Machines (2006)
- Cordes A Danser...Suite Saguenayenne (Ambiances Magnetiques, 2006)
- Andre Duchesne Meets Bamberg with Matthias Kundmueller, Frank Taschner (Cavalli, 2006)
