= Mark Howell =

American musician, composer, ethnomusicologist and music archaeologist

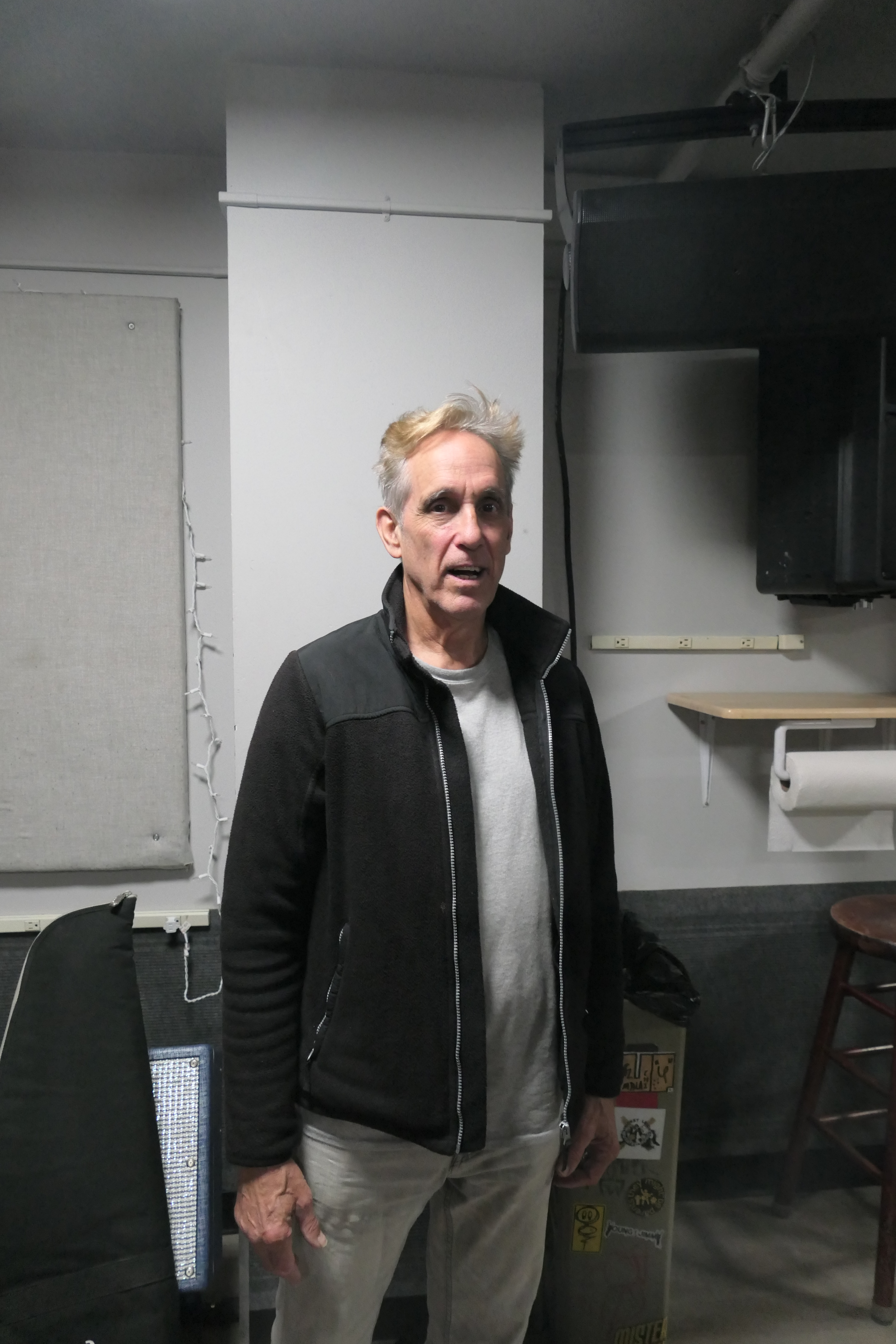
Mark Howell at William Hooker's brunch session in 2025

Mark Howell is an American musician, composer, ethnomusicologist, ethnomusicologist, and music archaeologist.

== Early life and education ==
Howell was born in Philadelphia, Mississippi in 1952 and moved to New York City in 1982. In Mississippi he learned and played guitar with local Blues musicians, including Foots Backstrum and Wade Walker. He also played with another Philadelphia native, Marty Stewart (guitarist with Johnny Cash). Before moving to New York City, Howell lived briefly in Jackson where he played and/or recorded with many Rock and Jazz musicians, including Tim Lee, Al Fielder, Cassandra Wilson, and Evan Gallagher.

In 1996 he earned an M.F.A. in music composition at SUNY Stony Brook; and in 2004 a Ph.D. in ethnomusicology from the CUNY Graduate Center with a dissertation called "An Ethnoarchaeological Investigation of Highland Guatemalan Maya Dance-Plays."2004 Ph.D. in Ethnomusicology, The Graduate Center, City University of New York (CUNY). Before then, between 1974-1975, he attended the Berklee College of Music in Boston, graduated from New York's Institute of Audio Research in 1974, and received a BA in Music in 1980 from the University of Southern Mississippi, Hattiesburg.

== Career ==
In 1983 he formed an avant-garde post-rock band called Better Than Death (BTD) with bass clarinetist Michael Lytle. Other members at various times included Coby Batty, Jeff Myers, and Erik Keil. In 1986 he collaborated with Etron Fou saxophonist Bruno Meillier to form a Euro-American group called Zero Pop. They recorded All the Big Mystics and Glows in the Dark. In between Zero Pop tours BTD recorded Swimman (1987), and followed that release with a U.S. tour. Between 1986 and 1994 Zero Pop toured Europe seven times and the United States three.

Howell played guitar on the Curlew record North America, and met Martin Bisi, Rick Brown, Tom Cora, and Fred Frith. In 1989 he and Frith, Nick Didkovsky, and Rene Lussier formed the Fred Frith Guitar Quartet. In 1989 Howell formed a third band, Timber, with drummer Rick Brown and bass player Faye Hunter who was later replaced by Jenny Wade. Between 1989 and 1996 Timber made two U.S. tours and one in Europe. They released one CD, Parts and Labor, and were included on Matador's LP and CD New York Eye and Ear Control, as well as on two of Elliott Sharp's State of the Union compilation CDs. Howell's involvement with the Fred Frith Guitar Quartet between 1989 and 1995 included five European tours, several U.S. performances and the recording of "The As Usual Dance Towards the Other Flight to What Is Not", which was released on Frith's CD Quartets. He also played with Frith, Didkovsky, Lussier, and others at the Brooklyn Academy of Music performance of "In Memory", in 1989.

In addition to his band work, Howell has composed for Lynn Shapiro (at the American Dance Festival 1994), Amy Sue Rosen, Diane Torr, and Stephanie Artz. He was also commissioned by several ensembles including "North By South" (1993) for percussionist Kevin Norton, and "To the Heart" (1997) for the ten-piece mixed ensemble New Ear. His composition scores were published by Frog Peak Music.

Howell has also researched the music of Pre-Columbian America. He has presented papers and published books and journals on topics related to music archaeology (see below). In 2006 he became the director of the Winterville site, an archaeology park and museum in the Mississippi Delta administered by the Mississippi Department of Archives and History.

== Music Archaeology Theories and Discoveries ==
In his research on Maya dance-plays (bailes) in Guatemala, Howell concurred with Henrietta Yurchenco, Dennis Tedlock, and other scholars, that the baile, Ra'binal Achi, contained Pre-Columbian music elements, which he isolated to include song structures controlled by rhythmic patterns on a slit-drum, specific instrumentation assigned to specific baile types, and an aesthetic preference of timbre over melody. The Ra'binal Achi slit-drum patterns incorporated a rhythmic system utilizing additive and subtractive patterns (not unlike Minimalism in Western Art Music.) In his analysis of European trading bells in the American southeast he discovered a Native American preference for high-pitch sounds over low-pitch ones, as well as propensity to re-function European trade items into sound makers. Also in the southeast, he collaborated with Jim Rees in proving that a cane flute found in the Breckenridge rock shelter in northwest Arkansas to be the oldest double-chambered duct flute known in America, with implications that construction, function, and even language associated with the flute may have accompanied the builders as they possibly migrated north to the Great Lakes region centuries before European contact. Howell's recent work deciphering Maya murals in Chajul, Guatemala (as part of the COMACH research team) implies the early introduction of the European Baroque guitar in the Guatemalan highlands. Moreover, that its unique tuning system (with double strings tuned from bottom to top, AA down to DD up to GG up to BB up to EE) has been transferred to standard six-string guitars used in specific Highland Maya rituals. In addition to his Native American research, Howell has conducted music archaeology work on African American music, where he validated a "worked" glass tradition beginning in the 17th century that may have led to the bottle-neck slide, along with a preference for double-framed monochords over single-frame ones, and a use of performance spaces generating higher over lower acoustic volume. He believes that the Blues Guitar should be characterized as a six-string "diddly bow" rather than a playing style on a standard Euro-American six-string guitar.

== Select Music Compositions ==
- 2013 "Architecture", music-dance piece for trumpet and computer, premiered in 2013 by composer, with dancer Stephanie Artz at the Jobe Auditorium (Delta State University), Cleveland, MS.
- 2009 "Nothing/Something Else", music-dance piece in five parts; for electric guitar, computer, trumpet, and tuba, premiered in 2009 by the composer (guitar and trumpet), Mark Snyder (computer and tuba), with dancers Stephanie Artz, Erin Mulligan, and the Sunflower County Freedom Project, at Still Our Only Future: Symposium for William Grant Still, Natchez, MS.
- 2006 "Maya", for electric guitar, funnel (homemade saxophone), "live" (digital multi-track program),

premiered in 2006 by Inconvenient Music at the Festival des Musiques Innovatrices de Saint-Etienne, France.

- 2005 "Furors", for oboe, accordion, and double bass, commissioned by Trio Akabasso, SUNY Stony Brook, NY.
- 1997 "To The Heart", for ten-piece mixed ensemble, premiered in 1997 by New Ear in Kansas City,MO.; arranged for strings, piano and percussion, premiered in 1998 by Sirius String Quartet, Jean Schneider (piano) and Danny Tunick (percussion) at Roulette, NYC.
- 1997 "Of Miracles and Magnetism", for string orchestra, premiered in 1997 by the USM String Orchestra at the Twenty-fifth Anniversary of the USM Dance Department.
- 1996 "For a Birthday", for electric violin and soprano, premiered in 1996 by Painted Carp at the Mixed Messages Festival, Context Studio, NYC.
- 1995 "The Quakening", electric guitar solo, premiered by composer in 1998 at the Soho Arts Festival, NYC.
- 1995 "Sugarlea", tape collage for choreographer Amy Sue Rosen, premiered in 1995 at Dia Arts Center, NYC.
- 1995 "Like Woods Around", for electric guitar quartet, premiered in 1995 by The Fred Frith Guitar Quartet at Klepeniersdoelen, Middelberg, Netherlands.
- 1994 "Cement", electric guitar solo, premiered in 1994 by composer at the American Dance Festival, Durham, N.C.; and at the Lincoln Center Outdoors Festival, New York; (dance choreography by Lynn Shapiro); also performed by Mauro Franceschi in 2001 at La Scala de San Telmo, Buenos Aires, and featured on his tours in South America and Europe.
- 1993 "A Short Sun", for string quartet, premiered in 1993 by Sirius String Quartet at the New Chamber Music Festival, NYC.
- 1993 "North By South", solo percussion, commissioned and premiered by Kevin Norton in 1993 at Roulette, NYC.
- 1990 "The History of Magic", for electric guitar quartet, premiered in 1990 by The Fred Frith Guitar Quartet at The Alternative Museum, NYC.

== Select Discography ==
(composer and/or performer)

- 2024 Seagull Brain (MH with Nick Didkovsky and Chris Cochrane) CD. Punos Music. https://doctornerve.bandcamp.com/album/seagull-brain.
- 2021 Screaming into the Yawning Vacuum of Victory, (MH with Nick Didkovsky) CD. Punos Music. https://doctornerve.bandcamp.com/album/screaming-into-the-yawning-vacuum-of-victory.
- 2009 Mark Howell, MP3 streaming. https://myspace.com/nanihwaya .
- 2007 Inconvenient Music, MP3 streaming. https://myspace.com /inconvenientmusic.
- 1999 Alleluia Anyway: Remembering Tom Cora (with the band Curlew), CD. Tzadik.
- 1997 Binky Boy (compilation, with the Fred Frith Guitar Quartet), CD. Punos Music.
- 1995 New York Guitars, CD. CRI.
- 1994 Quartets (with the Fred Frith Guitar Quartet), CD. Rec Rec Zürich.
- 1993-1996 Poetic Silhouettes Vols. 1, 2, and 3 (, CDs. AMF.
- 1993 Transforms: The Nerve Event Projects, CD. Cuneiform.
- 1992 Parts and Labor (Timber), CD and LP. Rift and Rough Trade London.
- 1992 Glows in the Dark (Zero Pop), CD. Rec Rec Zürich.
- 1991 New York Eye and Ear Control, CD and LP. Matador.
- 1990-1991 Vox Vulgaries Vols. 1 and 2 (CDs and Cassette Tapes. A/Rivista, Divergo.
- 1987 All the Big Mystics (with the band Zero Pop), LP. Rec Rec Zürich.
- 1987 Swimman (with the band Better Than Death), LP. Lost/Twin Tone.
- 1986 North America (with the band Curlew), LP. Möers (1986); reissued as CD, Cuneiform (2002).

== Select publications ==
- 2015-Present Co-Editor, Flower World: Music Archaeology of the Americas. Mundo Florido Arqueomusicología de las Américas. general editor Arnd Adje Both (With Matthias Stöckli), published by Ēkhō Verlag, Berlin. (Seven volumes published to date.)
- 2025 Recent Investigations on the Unique Maya Wall Paintings from Chajul (Guatemala). Investigaciones recientes sobre las singulares pinturas murales mayas de Chajul (Guatemala) (with Jarosław 'Zrałka, Monika Banach, Víctor castillo, et al.), estudio de cultura maya LVIII (spring-summer), published by British Archaeological Reports (BAR), London
- 2025 "Pre-Columbian Music of Veracruz/Mexican Gulf Coast" in Dizionario enciclopedico universale della musica e dei musicisti / DEUMM Onlin., ed. Zdravko Blazekovic. Administered by RILM, New York.
- 2025 "Musical Instruments in the Chajul Murals: Archaeo-and Ethnomusicological Interpretation" in Dancing for the Saints. The Ixil Murals of Chajul, El Quiché, Guatemala, eds. Jarosław Źrałka and Monika Banuch (co-author Igor Sarmientos), Dumbarton Oaks, Washington D.C.
- 2025 "The House of Twelve Doors: Animals, Flowers, and Musical Instruments in the Tz'unun Dance-Play of Chajul" in Dancing for the Saints. The Ixil Murals of Chajul, El Quiché, Guatemala, eds. Jarosław Źrałka and Monika Banuch (co-authors Monika Banach and Lucas Asicona Ramírez), Dumbarton Oaks, Washington D.C.
- 2025 "Chronicle of a Native American Music Reconstruction Venture: Experimental Ethno-Archaeomusicology/Winterville Mounds Instrument Reconstruction, Experimental Modeling, and Composition Project" in Music Archaeology's Paradox, ed. Miriam Kolar. (co-authors Paul Hamel and Timothy Archambault) (open source in 2025)
- 2025 "The Acoustics and Sound Environment of Early Delta Blues" in Archaeoacoustics: Scientific Exploration of Sound in Archaeology, ed. Miriam Kolar. (open-source in 2025)
- 2024 "Pre-Columbian Maya Valveless Tube Maya Trumpets" in Journal of Music Archaeology, Vol. I
- 2023 "African American Native American Music Syncretism" in Field Hollers and Freedom Songs, ed. Sadie Turnipseed. Vernon Press, Wilmington, DE
- 2021 "Audio Homogeneity in Organology" in Festschrift in Honor of Ricardo Eichmann, eds. Claudia Buhrig, et al. Harrassoswitz Verlag, Berlin
- 2021 "Music Evidence of Spanish, French, and English Encounters with Native Americans: The Similarities, Differences, and Consequences" in Sound, Political Space and Political Condition: Exploring Soundscapes of Societies Under Change. Topoi—Excellence Cluster Publication, eds., Ricardo Eichmann, Mark Howell, and Graeme Lawson, Berlin
- 2016 "Some Enigmatic Native American Artifacts. Audio Devices?, in Orient Archäologie Band 34 Studien zum Musikarchäologie X, eds., Ricardo Eichmann, Fang Jianjun, and Lars-Christian Koch. Berlin
- 2014 "Origin and Meaning of the Hopewell Panpipe" in Flower World: Archaeology of the Americas. Mundo Florido Arqueomusicología de las Américas, I, eds., Matthias Stöckli, Mark Howell, and Arnd Adje Both. Ēkhō Verlag, Berlin
- 2013 "An Organology of the Americas as Painted by John White and Other Artists" in Flower World: Archaeology of the Americas. Mundo Florido: Arqueomusicología de las Américas. I, eds., Matthias Stöckli and Arnd Adje Both. Ēkhō Verlag, Berlin
- 2013 "Tzunam Bailes and the Role of Music Instruments in Precolumbian Highland Guatemala" in Orient Archäologie Band 27 Studien zum Musikarchäologie VIII, eds., Ricardo Eichmann, Fang Jianjun, and Lars-Christian Koch. Berlin
- 2012 "A Possible Mississippian Ceramic Whistle." (Co-author, Jim Rees), The Mississippi Archaeology Association Journal 46 (2011: 1-2)
- 2011 "Sonic-Iconic Examination of Adorno Rattles from the Mississippian-Era Lake George Site" Music and Art 36 (2011:1-2). (Reprint, The Society for Chinese Music History, 2015)
- 2010 "A Hermeneutic Re-examination of Select Commentaries on Aztec Music" in Orient Archäologie Band 25 Studien zum Musikarchäologie VII, eds., Ellen Hickmann, Arnd Adje Both, Ricardo Eichmann, and Lars-Christian Koch. Berlin
- 2009 "Music Syncretism in the Postclassic K'iche' Warrior Dance and the Colonial Period Baile de los Moros y Cristianos" in Maya Worldviews at Conquest, eds. Leslie G. Cecil and Timothy W. Pugh. University Press of Colorado, Boulder
- 2008 "An Acoustic Analysis of La Salle's Trading Bells" in Orient Archäologie Band 22 Studien zum Musikarchäologie VI, eds., Ellen Hickmann, Arnd Adje Both, Ricardo Eichmann, and Lars-Christian Koch. Berlin
- 2007 "Possible Precolumbian Music Survivals in the Rab'inal Achi" The World of Music. Music Archaeology: Mesoamerica 49 (2007:2)
- 2006 "Las transcripciones musicales del Baile Drama del Rabinal Achi" Ethnomusicología en Guatemala (2006:66)
- 2003 "Concerning the Origin and Dissemination of the Mesoamerican Slit-Drum" Music and Art 28 (2003:1-2)
- 2001 Enchanted Music. Alley Tracts, a Division of Autonomedia (2001) (Reprinted by Sensitive Skin[on-line magazine of popular culture and the arts], 2016. <sensitiveskinmagazine.com> accessed January, 2023)

== Invited Presentations ==
- 2023 ISGMA 12th Symposium of the International Study Group on Music Archaeology, "Musicians and Their Instruments in the Maya Murals in Chajul, Guatemala"
- 2023 SAA 88th Meeting of the Society for American Archaeology. Panel on the Maya Murals at Chajul, Guatemala. Portland, OR. "The Musicians and Their Instruments"
- 2021 ISGMA 11th Symposium of the International Study Group on Music Archaeology, Sound as Material Culture: Experimental Archaeology and Ethno-Archaeology. Berlin. "Pre-Columbian Maya Trumpets"
- 2020 SAA 87th Meeting of the Society for American Archaeology, on-line, "Winterville Mounds Instrument Reconstruction, Experimental Modeling, and Composition Project"
- 2018 7th Annual Sweat Equity Investment in the Cotton Kingdom Symposium Itta Bena, MS, "African American and Native American Music Syncretism"
- 2016 ASA 175th Meeting of the Acoustic Society of America, Boston. "Acoustic Analysis of Delta Blues"
- 2015 ICTM 14th Symposium of the International Council of Traditional Music Study Group on Music Archaeology, Biskupin, Poland. "European Elements in Traditional Maya Music"
- 2014 ISGMA 9th Symposium of the International Study Group on Music Archaeology, Berlin. "Some Enigmatic Native American Artifacts, Audio Devices?"
- 2014 SAA 79th Meeting of the Society for American Archaeology, Music Archaeology Symposium, Panel on the Ephemeral Sensed Past. Archaeological Approaches to Sound and Human Experiences, Austin. "Instrument Morphology and Cultural Preferences"
- 2014 56th Caddo Conference and 21st East Texas Archaeological Conference, Tyler, TX. "A Possible Prehispanic Mississippian Ceramic Whistle"
- 2012 Annual Southern Archivists Conference, Jackson, MS. Keynote Speaker: "Archaeology of the Blues"
- 2011 ICTM 2nd re-instituted International Council of Traditional Music Symposium, Valladolid, Spain. "Origin and Meaning of the Hopewell Panpipe"
- 2011 Primer Encuentro de Arqueomusicología de las Américas, Guatemala City. "An Organology of the Americas as Painted by John White and Other Artists"
- 2010 ISGMA 7th Symposium of the International Study Group on Music Archaeology, Tianjin, China. "Music Assimilation of the Postclassic K'iche Warrior Dance into the Colonial Era Baile de los Moros y Cristianos"
- 2009 ICTM/MI 1st re-instituted International Study Group on Music Archaeology-Music Iconography Joint Meeting, CUNY Graduate Center, New York. "Sonic-Iconic Examination of Adorno Rattles from the Mississippian-Era Lake George Site"
- 2008 ISGMA Symposium of the International Study Group on Music Archaeology, Berlin. "A Hermeneutic Re-Examination of Select Sixteenth-Century Commentaries on Aztec Music"
- 2007 SEAC Annual Southeastern Archaeology Conference, Knoxville, TN. "An Acoustic Analysis of La Salle's Trading Bells"
- 2005 SEM 50th Anniversary Meeting of the Society for Ethnomusicology, Atlanta. "African-American Instrument Adoption and Adaptation: Evidence from Music Archaeology and Ethnomusicology"
- 2003 9th Conference of the Research Center for Music Iconography, New York. "Meanings Behind the Representations of Precolumbian Maya Trumpets"
- 2003 ICTM Symposium on the International Study Group on Music Archaeology, Los Angeles. "Maya Music Survivals"

== Organization of International Conferences ==
- 2012 Co-organizer, the "Klangraumes" for the TOPOI 1 exhibition at the Pergamon Museum. "Austellung des Excellence Cluster, TOPOI—The Formation and Transformation of Space and Knowledge in Ancient Civilizations: Jenseits des Horizonts—Raum und Wissen in dem Kulturen der Alten Welt." Berlin, June 22-October 22.
- 2011 Co-organizer, TOPOI—Excellence Cluster Workshop, with Dr. Ricardo Eichmann and Dr. Graeme Lawson: "Sound, Political Space, and Political Condition: Exploring Soundscapes of Societies Under Change." DAI Wiegandhaus, Berlin, June 21-23.

== Prizes and Awards ==
- 2002 CUNY Dissertation Research Committee Award, to finance fieldwork for Maya music research in Guatemala
- 1999 Continental Harmony American Composers Forum, Music Composition Finalist ("Furors")
- 1997 Mississippi Arts and Letters, Music Composition Prize ("For a Birthday and "Of Miracles and Magnetism")
- 1995 Composers Recordings Incorporated (CRI) recording commission ("The Quakening"). University of Southern Mississippi String Orchestra-Dance Department composition commission ("Of Miracles and Magnetism")
- 1994 American Dance Festival (Durhan, N.C.), Composer in Residence ("Cement")
- 1994 The Art in Youth Project (Gulfport, MS and Pascagoula, MS), Artist in Residence
- 1994 Meet The Composer, award commission ("A Short Sun")
- 1989 Mary Flagler Carey Charitable Trust Recording Program and Mills College Center for Contemporary Music Grant—Rift Records (co-director with Rick Brown), for Bob Ostertag's CD Attention Span
