= Les 4 Guitaristes de l'Apocalypso-Bar =

Canadian electric guitar quartet

- Left to right: Jean-Pierre Bouchard, Roger Boudreault, André Duchesne, René Lussier

Background information
- Origin: Montreal, Quebec, Canada
- Genre: Experimental music
- Years active: 1986–1989
- Label: Ambiances Magnétiques
- Past members: André Duchesne; René Lussier; Jean-Pierre Bouchard; Roger Boudreault; Chris Cutler; Ferdinand Richard; Claude Fradette; Rémi Leclerc

Les 4 Guitaristes de l'Apocalypso-Bar, also known as Les Quatre Guitaristes de l'Apocalypso-Bar (English: The 4 Guitarists of the Apocalypso-Bar) was an electric guitar quartet founded by André Duchesne in Montreal, Quebec, Canada in 1986. It was one of the first electric guitar quartets and was billed as a band from post-apocalypse Canada "inspired by the ghost of Jimi Hendrix".

Les 4 Guitaristes de l'Apocalypso-Bar performed for four years in Canada, the United States and Europe. They released two albums, in 1987 and 1989.

== Biography ==
In the mid-1980s, experimental rock guitarist and composer André Duchesne from Montreal, Quebec, Canada began writing contrapuntal compositions for a guitar quartet. To perform them he recruited René Lussier and Jean-Pierre Bouchard from Conventum, Duchesne's late-1970s avant-garde folk-rock group, and Roger Boudreault, a jazz guitarist. The quartet premiered at the 4th Festival International de Musique Actuelle de Victoriaville at Victoriaville, Quebec in October 1986 with ex-Henry Cow drummer Chris Cutler. Duchesne wanted drums to complete the group's sound and asked Cutler, who was already playing at the festival with Cassiber, to perform with the quartet. Also present at the festival was ex-Henry Cow guitarist and composer Fred Frith, who was playing in a duo with Lussier. Frith was impressed with Duchesne's guitar quartet and later wrote an extended composition, "The As Usual Dance Towards the Other Flight to What Is Not" for them to play. In 1989 Frith formed his own guitar quartet, the Fred Frith Guitar Quartet.

Les 4 Guitaristes de l'Apocalypso-Bar was a concept band with an history constructed by Duchesne. From the future, and "inspired by the ghost of Jimi Hendrix", they were the resident band at the Apocalypso-Bar in a wrecked jetliner in post-apocalypse Canada. Being a bar band they wore white suits and tiger ties, and played sitting down, with the soloists standing. The "band from the future" concept extended to the titles of their albums. In 1987, they released a studio album they called Tournée Mondiale/Été '89 (World Tour/Summer '89), followed in 1989 by Fin de Siècle (End of Century). In 1995 a compilation album entitled World Tour 1998 was released by Cutler's Recommended Records featuring most of the tracks from their first two albums.

François Couture at AllMusic described their music as "a cross between [guitarists] Robert Fripp's circular motifs and Fred Frith's angular playing." They toured Canada, the United States and Europe, maintaining their "bar band" image throughout. In early 1989, jazz guitarist Claude Fradette replaced Boudreault, bassist Ferdinand Richard from Etron Fou Leloublan joined, and Rémi Leclerc from Miriodor played drums when Cutler was engaged elsewhere. By the end of 1989, having exhausted the band's concept, they decided to split up.

== Members ==
- André Duchesne – electric guitar
- René Lussier – electric bass guitar, electric guitar
- Jean-Pierre Bouchard – electric guitar
- Roger Boudreault (1986–1988) – classical guitar, electric guitar
- Ferdinand Richard (1989) – 6-string electric bass guitar
- Claude Fradette (1989) – electric guitar
- Chris Cutler – drums
- Rémi Leclerc (1989) – drums

== Discography ==
Source: AllMusic

- Tournée Mondiale/Été '89 (1987, LP, Ambiances Magnétiques, Canada)
- Fin de Siècle (1989, LP, Ambiances Magnétiques, Canada)
- World Tour 1998 (1995, CD, Recommended Records, United Kingdom) – compilation comprising most tracks from the previous two albums
