= Le trésor de la langue =

Studio album by René Lussier
- Released: 1989
- Genre: Experimental, sound sculpture
- Length: 1:05:47
- Label: Ambiances Magnétiques
- Producer: René Lussier

Le trésor de la langue (English: The treasure of language) is an album by guitarist René Lussier. It was released by Ambiances Magnétiques in 1989.

The album contains several interviews with residents of Québec on the importance of the french language within the province. A number of famous historical recordings are also featured, including Charles de Gaulle's famous "Vive le Québec libre!" speech of 1967 and a recitation of the FLQ Manifesto. These spoken-word recordings are interspersed with the music, as Lussier plays a single note on his guitar to correspond with every syllable of speech. He is quoted as saying, "It's remarkable what melodies we speak to each other every day! And no one's the least bothered by these phrases, but transpose them into music and they can become surprising, even disturbing!"

Although much of Le trésor de la langue is devoted to the continued importance of French in Québécois culture, its message is not one of unadulterated Québec nationalism. The album includes a poem by Richard Desjardins entitled "Qui s'en souvient?", which chronicles the destruction of several Native American societies by English and French colonialists. The liner notes also refer to contemporary events in Canadian politics as a "poisoned chalice" for the survival of the language.

== Track listing ==
1. La Française du début/Le non-lieu/Vox pop 1/Le départ des aventuriers (4:26)
2. Arts et traditions (direction 1)/L'heure du dîner (archives 1)/Les 2 soeurs de Trois-Rivières (direction 2)/Rue Principale/Montage 28 (archives 2) (7:55)
3. La visite de Charles de Gaulle/De Gaulle revisité/L'Anglaise de Québec (direction 3)/Kiki/Manifeste du F.L.Q. (9:04)
4. Vestibule/Çé ça qu'on va faire!/Le gars du Irving (direction 4)/Le tic-tac d'la veille/Le blues des résultats/Lend'main d'veille/Qui se souvient? (8:24)
5. L'appel d'la pelle (direction 5)/Ya tout' mon estime/Le manifeste du F.L.Q. (instrumental) (5:24)
6. Le message d'la reine/Échange de bar (2:59)
7. Fanfare et tradition (vox pop 2)/L'indécise (2:45)
8. C't'écoeurant/Vestibule léger (direction 6)/Ma mère/Ha bein çé l'fun (6:18)
9. Ouin çé ça (vox pop 3)/Vous me m'nez à bout'/Le commercial (4:36)
10. Mme Xavier Martin revisitée/Le p'tit Jésus de M. Chose (4:38)
11. Le Diable (archives 3)/L'enfer (Le reel de l'estime)/Le réveil (3:25)
12. L'amygdalite à Duchesne (téléphone 1)/Wow bec! (4:15)
13. On peut parler (téléphone 2) (1:38)

== Personnel ==
- René Lussier: guitars, six-string bass, casiotone, percussion, ambiances, voice
- Jean Derome: saxophone, flute, keyboards, voice
- Fred Frith: electric bass, violin, piano
- Claude Beaugrand: ambiances magnétiques, voice
- Claude Simard: upright bass
- Alain Trudel: trombone, euphonium
- Céline Chaput: voice
- Jean-Denis Levasseur: clarinet
- Richard Desjardins: voice
- Pierre St-Jak: piano
- Tom Cora: cello
- Louis-Pierre Bougie: illustrations

All tracks written by René Lussier. Arranged by Lussier with Jean Derome and Fred Frith. All tracks produced by Lussier; tracks 1–4 co-produced by Hélène Prévost.

Tracks 1–4 mixed by Gaétan Pilon, Lussier and Frith. Tracks 5–13 mixed by Pilon, Lussier and Jean Derome.
