= Freedom in Fragments =

Studio album by Fred Frith
- Released: February 2002
- Recorded: Feb 1999 – Jan 2000
- Studios: Mr. Toad's, San Francisco
- Genres: Avant-garde jazz; Improvisation
- Length: 48:21
- Label: Tzadik (US)

Fred Frith chronology
Clearing (2001)	Freedom in Fragments (2002)	Accidental (2002)

Professional ratings
Review scores
Source	Rating
AllMusic	3.5/5 stars
Pitchfork Media	8.3/10

Freedom in Fragments is a studio album by English guitarist, composer and improvisor Fred Frith. It was composed by Frith in 1993 as "a suite of 23 pieces for saxophone quartet", and was performed by the Rova Saxophone Quartet between February 1999 and January 2000 in San Francisco. The album was released on Tzadik Records' Composer Series in February 2002. Frith does not perform on this album.

The Freedom in Fragments suite was also recorded in January 2008 by the ARTE Quartett, and released by Intakt Records (Switzerland) in January 2009 on a CD entitled The Big Picture by Fred Frith and ARTE Quartett. One of the tracks from the suite, "Freedom Is Your Friends II" was performed by the Fred Frith Guitar Quartet on their 1997 album Ayaya Moses.

== Background ==
Freedom in Fragments was commissioned by the San Francisco-based Rova Saxophone Quartet and was composed by Frith specifically for them while he was living at Big Sur, California. He wrote it as a suite of 23 short pieces, or "stories", that can be played as a whole, or in part, and in any given sequence. Frith wanted a composition "which could reach their narrative potential by a force of accumulation ... small stories that, when heard together, become big stories."

Frith also composed the suite in a way that the music could be improvised: "The determining factor was the understanding that Rova wanted material which they could transform through improvisation. Most of the stories, therefore, involve some question about what might constitute musical freedom." One reviewer of the album stated that "[t]he suite's greatest strength is the way it lets Rova crawl around their instruments, from the melodic ballads to noisy skronk."

The "story" sequence performed here by Rova was created by Frith, although it is just one configuration of the work, and only 16 of the 23 pieces appear on the album. The entire work was dedicated to the memory of Charles Mingus, with certain pieces inspired by Frank Zappa, Jimmy Giuffre and Ikue Mori.

== Track listing ==
All tracks written by Fred Frith.

1. "Freedom Is Your Friends" / "Some Assembly Required" – 3:42
2. "Advertising" – 0:17
3. "Song and Dance" – 4:05
4. "Void Where Prohibited" / "The Up and Up" – 4:50
5. "Boyan's Problem" – 3:26
6. "Ikue's Song" – 1:00
7. "T Square Park Lark (for Frank Zappa)" – 9:15
8. "Significant Restrictions Apply" – 1:17
9. "Hey René" – 0:17
10. "Chained to the Skyway" – 5:51
11. "Batteries Not Included" / " Nostalgia" – 3:16
12. "Water Under the Bridge (for Jimmy Giuffre)" – 5:05
13. "Freedom Is Your Friends II" – 6:00

== Personnel ==
- Rova Saxophone Quartet
  - Bruce Ackley – soprano saxophone
  - Steve Adams – alto saxophone
  - Jon Raskin – baritone saxophone
  - Larry Ochs – tenor saxophone, sopranino saxophone

=== Sound and artwork ===
- Recorded at Mr. Toad's, San Francisco, February 1999 – January 2000
- Mixed by Jeff Byrd and Larry Ochs
- Cover artwork by Heike Liss
