= Eleventh Hour (Fred Frith album) =

Studio album by Fred Frith
- Released: 2005
- Recorded: 2003–2004, Germany; 2004, United States
- Genre: Chamber music; experimental music
- Length: 101:00
- Label: Winter & Winter (Germany)
- Producer: Fred Frith, Carlos Albrecht, Stefan Winter

Fred Frith chronology
50th Birthday Celebration Volume Five (2004)	Eleventh Hour (2005)	The Compass, Log and Lead (2006)

Eleventh Hour is a double album by English guitarist, composer and improvisor Fred Frith. It comprises five long pieces composed by Frith between 1990 and 2001, and was performed by the Arditti Quartet (strings) with Uwe Dierksen (trombone), William Winant (electric guitars) and Frith (electric guitars), in Germany and the United States in 2003 and 2004. Frith only plays on the second CD of this album.

== Description ==
With the exception of "Stick Figures", the Arditti Quartet, under the direction of Frith, performed on all the pieces, and were recorded at Il Bagno in Steinfurt, Germany in June 2003.

"Lelekovice", for a string quartet, also called "String Quartet #1", was written in 1990 for Iva Bittová, Lelekovice being the name of the village near Brno in the Czech Republic where Bittová lives. It was first performed in July 1991 by the Edison Quartet at the Nieuwe Musiek Festival, in Middelburg, the Netherlands, and was used by the United States choreographer Amanda Miller in her dance piece, My Father's Vertigo in 1991. A recording was made in December 1992 by the Violet Wires String Quartet in London, which was released on Frith's 1994 album, Quartets. The recording on this album was made by the Arditti Quartet in 2003.

"Tense Serenity", for a string trio and trombone, was written in 1997 and was performed here by the Arditti Quartet as a trio (without Graeme Jennings on violin) and Uwe Dierksen on trombone.

"Allegory" and "Fell", both for string quartet and electric guitar, were composed in 2001, and were performed here by the Arditti Quartet in June 2003 in Germany. Frith's electric guitar was recorded later in March 2004 in Germany and added to the mix.

"Stick Figures", for six guitars and two players, was composed in 1990 and performed by Frith and William Winant in the United States in May 2004. They multi-tracked prepared electric guitars to create layers of guitar sounds.

== Reception ==
Professional ratings
Review scores
Source	Rating
All About Jazz	4/5 stars

A review in All About Jazz said this of the album: "Eleventh Hour documents Frith’s continued growth as a composer in the new music arena, and for all its juxtaposition of light and dark, it remains totally compelling and strangely beautiful." Another review at All About Jazz said that "Frith continues to beguile and surprise".

Andrew Lindemann Malone, writing for Jazz Times, commented: "the line separating music that intoxicates listeners with its mysterious stillness from music that bores listeners to tears with its complete lack of musical incident is perilously thin, and composer Fred Frith spends some time on both sides of that border on Eleventh Hour."

== Track listing ==
Disc 1

1. "Lelekovice (String Quartet #1, for Iva Bittová)" (Frith)
  - "Part I" – 1:48
  - "Part II" – 4:42
  - "Part III" – 0:49
  - "Part IV" – 3:18
  - "Part V" – 2:07
  - "Part VI" – 4:45
  - "Part VII" – 5:44
  - "Part VIII" – 1:04
  - "Part XI" – 4:02
2. "Tense Serenity (string trio and trombone)" (Frith)
  - "Part I" – 11:23
  - "Part II" – 9:00
  - "Part III" – 4:58
  - "Part VI" – 3:58
  - "Part V" – 2:13

Disc 2

1. "Allegory (string quartet and electric guitar, for Irvine Arditti)" (Frith)
  - "Part I" – 3:51
  - "Part II" – 7:00
  - "Part III" – 4:03
2. "Stick Figures (6 guitars and 2 players)" (Frith) – 17:28
3. "Fell (string quartet and electric guitar)" (Frith) – 11:55

== Personnel ==
- Arditti Quartet (disc 1, track 1; disc 2, tracks 1,3)
  - Irvine Arditti – violin
  - Graeme Jennings – violin
  - Ralf Ehlers – viola
  - Rohan de Saram – cello
- Arditti Trio (disc 1, track 2)
  - Irvine Arditti – violin
  - Ralf Ehlers – viola
  - Rohan de Saram – cello
- Uwe Dierksen – trombone (disc 1, track 2)
- William Winant – electric guitars (disc 2, track 2)
- Fred Frith – electric guitars (disc 2, tracks 1–3)

== Sound ==
- Disc 1, tracks 1,2 and disc 2, tracks 1,3 recorded at Il Bagno, Steinfurt, Germany, June 2003
- Disc 2, tracks 1,3, guitar recorded at Erich Thienhaus Institut Hochschule fur Musik, Detmold, Germany, March 2004
- Disc 2, track 2 recorded at Guerrilla Recordings, Oakland, United States, May 2004
- Engineered by Christoph Terbuyken, Marcel Babazadeh and Myles Boisen
