= Fred Frith Guitar Quartet =

American contemporary classical and experimental music guitar quartet

Background information
- Origin: United States
- Genres: Experimental, contemporary classical, free improvisation
- Years active: 1989–1999
- Label: Ambiances Magnétiques
- Past members: Fred Frith; René Lussier; Nick Didkovsky; Mark Stewart

The Fred Frith Guitar Quartet was an American-based contemporary classical and experimental music guitar quartet comprising Fred Frith, René Lussier, Nick Didkovsky and Mark Stewart. The group was formed in 1989 by Frith and they performed extensively across North America and Europe for the next ten years, including at the 14th Festival International de Musique Actuelle de Victoriaville in Victoriaville, Quebec, Canada in May 1997. They recorded their first album, Ayaya Moses in 1996, and released a live album, Upbeat in 1999.

The quartet experimented with guitar music, composing and performing their own material, improvising, and re-arranging existing guitar pieces by other composers. Their music varied from "tuneful and pretty, to noisy, aggressive and quite challenging."

== History ==
The quartet comprised four "avant-garde" guitarists and composers: Englishman Fred Frith from Henry Cow, French Canadian René Lussier from Conventum, and United States musicians Nick Didkovsky from Doctor Nerve and Mark Stewart from Bang on a Can. Frith had been collaborating with Lussier on various projects since the early 1980s, had performed regularly with Stewart, and had produced Doctor Nerve's album, Armed Observation (1987).

Frith originally created the quartet in 1989 to perform a composition for four electric guitars, "The As Usual Dance Towards the Other Flight to What is Not" that he had previously written for, but not performed in, Les 4 Guitaristes de l'Apocalypso-Bar. The original quartet, Lussier, Didkovsky, Mark Howell and Frith, recorded the composition in April 1992 and it was released on Frith's Quartets album in 1994. Later Stewart replaced Howell and the group became known as the Fred Frith Guitar Quartet.

The quartet's first album under its new name was recorded in Radio-Canada's Studio 12 at Maison Radio-Canada in Montreal in July and November 1996, and was released on Lussier's own Ambiances Magnétiques label. The CD consisted of three pieces composed by Italian Olivia Bignardi and Québécois Claude Vivier; a piece composed by each member of the group; and a collection of improvised suites by the quartet.

Their second album, Upbeat was drawn from concerts the quartet had performed in Austria, Germany, Switzerland, France and Spain in November 1997. It contained composed material from each of the group members, plus improvised pieces, and was released on Ambiances Magnétiques in 1999.

== Members ==
- Fred Frith – electric guitar
- René Lussier – electric guitar
- Nick Didkovsky – electric guitar
- Mark Stewart – electric guitar
- Mark Howell – electric guitar (original member)

== Discography ==
- Ayaya Moses (1997, CD, Ambiances Magnétiques, Canada)
- Upbeat (1999, CD, Ambiances Magnétiques, Canada)
