= Upbeat (album) =

1999 live/studio album by Fred Frith Guitar Quartet

Live album / Studio album by Fred Frith Guitar Quartet
- Released: 1999
- Recorded: November 1997
- Venue: • Frankfurt, Germany • Basel, Switzerland • Vandœuvre-lès-Nancy, France • Madrid, Spain
- Studio: Tonstudio Amann, Vienna, Austria
- Genre: • Contemporary classical music • Experimental music • Free improvisation
- Length: 55:19
- Label: Ambiances Magnétiques (Canada)
- Producer: Fred Frith

Fred Frith Guitar Quartet chronology
| Ayaya Moses (1997) | Upbeat (1999) |

Upbeat (also sometimes referred to as UpBeat or Up Beat) is a 1999 live and studio album by the Fred Frith Guitar Quartet, an American-based contemporary classical and experimental music guitar quartet comprising Fred Frith, René Lussier, Nick Didkovsky and Mark Stewart. It is their second album, after Ayaya Moses (1997), and was released by Canadian record label, Ambiances Magnétiques. The live material was drawn from concerts the quartet had performed in Germany, Switzerland, France and Spain in November 1997. The studio tracks were recorded at Tonstudio Amann in Vienna, Austria, also in November 1997.

The album comprises pieces composed by each of the four members of the quartet, played solo and in the group, plus additional pieces improvised by the quartet. Frith's "No Bones" is an adaption of his song "Bones" from Massacre's 1981 album, Killing Time.

== Reception ==
Professional ratings
Review scores
| Source | Rating |
|---|---|
| AllMusic | 4/5 stars |

In a review of Upbeat at AllMusic Tom Schulte described the tracks on the album as "angular, mathematical, and extemporaneous". He wrote that each of the four guitarists demonstrate what can be done with the instrument, and then, as a quartet, "take it to the fourth power". Reviewing the album in the Canadian Sunday Herald, Stephen Pedersen called the quartet "a delightfully wild and wooly bunch", who are "superb masters of their instruments and intensely in tune with each other". He said they explore the percussive and rhythmic nature of the guitar, and blend noise with folk, jazz and country music to produce an "intriguing CD" of "brilliant effects".

Writing in The Wire, Mike Barnes complimented Frith on the "admirable restraint" he displays in his quartet—as if he "is waiting [for] something to say"—but added that Upbeat "certainly says a great deal". Barnes said that, not unexpectedly, the album's sources are difficult to identify, but he felt there is "a lot of the subversion" targeting country and western music. "Speedy Feety" has a "[c]ountry feel", and becomes overly sentimental in "Red Rag", which Barnes described as "a corny melody set against a gauzy, blurred backdrop".

Reviewing the album in Coda magazine, James Hale said Frith, Didkovsky, Stewart and Lussier each have one thing in common: they "share a passion for exploring the sonic possibilities" of the electric guitar. Hale described Upbeat as part "catchy phrases and speaker-shredding sound". He added that the quartet's "real power" is that they have not "forgotten the fun of plugging in an electric guitar for the first time. When they all pick up on an idea and begin extrapolating ... it's a guitar-lover's dream come true."

== Track listing ==
All music by the Fred Frith Guitar Quartet, except where noted.

| No. | Title | Writer | Venue/Studio | Length |
|---|---|---|---|---|
| 1. | "Motormouth" | Fred Frith | Tonstudio Amann, Vienna, Austria | 4:10 |
| 2. | | | | 7:53 |
| 2a. | "Stinky Eye" | | Tonstudio Amann, Vienna, Austria | |
| 2b. | "(ND Solo)" | Nick Didkovsky | Live at Mousonturm, Frankfurt, Germany | |
| 2c. | "To Laugh Uncleanly at the Nurse" | Didkovsky | Live at Colegio Mayor San Juan Evangelista, Madrid, Spain | |
| 3. | "Spitty Boy" | | Tonstudio Amann, Vienna, Austria | 0:52 |
| 4. | | | | 12:38 |
| 4a. | "Antaeus" | Didkovsky | Live at Maison de la Culture Andre Malraux, Vandœuvre-lès-Nancy, France | |
| 4b. | (FF Solo) | Frith | Live at Kulturwerkstatt, Basel, Switzerland | |
| 4c. | "Rosali's Song" | Frith | Live at Kulturwerkstatt, Basel, Switzerland | |
| 5. | "Squinty Pea" | | Tonstudio Amann, Vienna, Austria | 1:53 |
| 6. | | | | 5:17 |
| 6a. | "(MS Solo)" | Mark Stewart | Live at Mousonturm, Frankfurt, Germany | |
| 6b. | "Speedy Feety" | Stewart | Live at Mousonturm, Frankfurt, Germany | |
| 7. | "Red Rag" | Frith | Live at Colegio Mayor San Juan Evangelista, Madrid, Spain | 3:36 |
| 8. | "Out to Bomb Fresh Kings" | Didkovsky | Live at Maison de la Culture Andre Malraux, Vandœuvre-lès-Nancy, France | 1:25 |
| 9. | Say Slinky | | Tonstudio Amann, Vienna, Austria | 1:48 |
| 10. | | | | 8:06 |
| 10a. | "(RL Solo)" | René Lussier | Live at Kulturwerkstatt, Basel, Switzerland | |
| 10b. | "Tout de Suite" | Lussier | Live at Kulturwerkstatt, Basel, Switzerland | |
| 11. | "Skinny Bee" | | Tonstudio Amann, Vienna, Austria | 1:33 |
| 12. | "No Bones" | Frith | Live at Mousonturm, Frankfurt, Germany | 3:45 |
| 13. | "Sinky Sea" | | Tonstudio Amann, Vienna, Austria | 2:14 |

Sources: Liner notes, Discogs, Fred Frith discography.

== Personnel ==
- Fred Frith – electric guitar
- René Lussier – electric guitar
- Nick Didkovsky – electric guitar
- Mark Stewart – electric guitar

Sources: Liner notes, Discogs, Fred Frith discography.

=== Sound and artwork ===
- Live recordings by Emmanuel Gilot
- Studio recordings by Christoph Amann
- Mastered by Marc Fortin and René Lussier
- Mastered by Peter Hardt
- Produced by Fred Frith
- Photography by Heike Liss
- Illustrations by Finn Timo Liss
- Graphic design by Jean-François Denis and Luc Beauchemin

Sources: Liner notes, Discogs, Fred Frith discography.
