= Back to Life (Fred Frith album) =

Studio album by Fred Frith
- Released: January 2008
- Recorded: June 1998, May 2006, September 2007
- Genre: Chamber music
- Length: 64:10
- Label: Tzadik (US)
- Producer: Fred Frith

Fred Frith chronology
The Sugar Factory (2007)	Back to Life (2008)	The Art of Memory II (2008)

Professional ratings
Review scores
Source	Rating
AllMusic	4/5 stars

Back to Life is a studio album by English guitarist, composer and improvisor Fred Frith. It comprises five classical chamber music pieces composed by Frith between 1993 and 2005, and was performed between 1998 and 2007 by Belgian pianist Daan Vandewalle, United States percussionist William Winant, and the Callithumpian Consort ensemble of the New England Conservatory of Music, conducted by Stephen Drury. The album was released on Tzadik Records' Composer Series in 2008.

Frith does not perform on this album.

== Compositions ==
Five of Fred Frith's works are featured on this album:

- "Seven Circles" for piano (1995)
- "Save As" for cello and percussion (2005)
- "Bridge is Bridge" (from "Shortened Suite") for trumpet, oboe, cello and marimba (1996)
- "Back to Life" for trumpet, oboe, cello and marimba (1997)
- "Elegy for Elias" for piano, violin and marimba (1993)

== Track listing ==
All titles composed by Fred Frith.

1. "Seven Circles" – 2:59
  - Performed by Daan Vandewalle on 13 June 1998 at the Koninklijk Conservatorium Gent, in Ghent, Belgium
2. "Save As" – 16:10
  - Performed by Joan Jeanrenaud and William Winant on 29 May 2006 at Guerrilla HiFi in Oakland, California
3. "Seven Circles 2" – 5:08
  - Performed by Daan Vandewalle on 13 June 1998 at the Koninklijk Conservatorium Gent, in Ghent, Belgium
4. "Bridge is Bridge" – 7:16
  - Performed by Stephen Drury and the Callithumpian Consort on 20 September 2007 in the New England Conservatory's Jordan Hall
5. "Seven Circles 3" – 1:37
  - Performed by Daan Vandewalle on 13 June 1998 at the Koninklijk Conservatorium Gent, in Ghent, Belgium
6. "Seven Circles 4" – 3:45
  - Performed by Daan Vandewalle on 13 June 1998 at the Koninklijk Conservatorium Gent, in Ghent, Belgium
7. "Back to Life" – 8:57
  - Performed by Stephen Drury and the Callithumpian Consort on 20 September 2007 in the New England Conservatory's Jordan Hall
8. "Seven Circles 5" – 1:34
  - Performed by Daan Vandewalle on 13 June 1998 at the Koninklijk Conservatorium Gent, in Ghent, Belgium
9. "Seven Circles 6" – 4:40
  - Performed by Daan Vandewalle on 13 June 1998 at the Koninklijk Conservatorium Gent, in Ghent, Belgium
10. "Elegy for Elias" – 9:26
  - Performed by William Winant, Stephen Drury and Gabriela Dîaz on 20 September 2007 in the New England Conservatory's Jordan Hall
11. "Seven Circles 7" – 2:38
  - Performed by Daan Vandewalle on 13 June 1998 at the Koninklijk Conservatorium Gent, in Ghent, Belgium

== Personnel ==
Callithumpian Consort ensemble

- Stephen Drury – conductor, piano
- Joan Jeanrenaud – cello, newspaper, metal can
- John Andress – marimba
- Joe Becker – percussion
- Dylan Chmura-Moore – trombone
- Gabriela Dîaz – violin
- Elizabeth England – oboe
- Benjamin Fox – oboe
- Angela Park – cello
- John Russell – trumpet
- Karina Schmitz – viola
- Benjamin Schwartz – cello
- Andrew Stetson – trumpet
- Nick Tolle – marimba
- Jordan Voelker – viola
- Ethan Wood – violin

Soloists

- Daan Vandewalle – piano
- William Winant – marimba, vibraphone, woodblocks, tamtam, tuned gong, large metal plate, toms, bass drum, beans, ping-pong balls, hammer and nails, metal can, etc.

Production

- John Zorn – executive producer
- Kazunori Sugiyama – associate producer
- Fred Frith – producer
- Myles Boisen – compilation, editing and mixing; recording ("Save As")
- Scott Hull – mastering
- Harry de Winde – recording ("Seven Circles")
- Patrick Keating – recording ("Bridge is Bridge", "Back to Life", "Elegy for Elias")
- Heung-Heung Chin – design
- Heike Liss – photography
