= Ayaya Moses =

Studio album by Fred Frith Guitar Quartet
- Released: 1997
- Recorded: July and November 1996
- Studio: Studio 12, Maison Radio-Canada, Montreal, Quebec, Canada
- Genre: • Contemporary classical music • Experimental music • Free improvisation
- Length: 54:29
- Label: Ambiances Magnétiques (Canada)
- Producer: Hélène Prévost

Fred Frith Guitar Quartet chronology
Ayaya Moses (1997)	Upbeat (1998)

Ayaya Moses is a 1997 studio album by the Fred Frith Guitar Quartet, an American-based contemporary classical and experimental music guitar quartet comprising Fred Frith, René Lussier, Nick Didkovsky and Mark Stewart. It is their debut album and was recorded in Radio-Canada's Studio 12 at Maison Radio-Canada in Montreal, Quebec, Canada, seven years after the ensemble was formed in 1989. It was released by Canadian record label, Ambiances Magnétiques.

The fourteen-track album comprises three pieces by external composers and arranged by the quartet, a piece composed by each of the four members of the quartet, and seven short pieces improvised by the group. Lussier's piece includes music he composed for La Manière des Blancs, a film by Bernard Hémond. Frith's track "Freedom Is Your Friends II" is taken from Freedom in Fragments, an album composed by Frith and performed by the Rova Saxophone Quartet. Didkovsky's piece "She Closes Her Sister With Heavy Bones" comes from Their Eyes Bulged With Sparkling Pockets, a larger work he composed for chamber orchestra.

== Reception ==
Professional ratings
Review scores
Source	Rating
AllMusic	3/5 stars

In a review at AllMusic, François Couture said Ayaya Moses "showcases four gifted avant-garde guitarists" negotiating "demanding compositions". He called Lussier's title track, "Ayaya Moses" "the strongest piece", and described the album as a whole as "[m]ore serious and industrious" than the quartet's next album, Upbeat.

Reviewing the album in The Wire, Mike Barnes described it as "a dazzling display of… well, virtually everything that electric guitars can produce in the right hands." He said the music swings from "clean strumming and delicate melody ... to blocks of atonal noise and all points in between". Barnes remarked that while the electric guitar in this chamber ensemble is far removed from its traditionally role in rock music, the "spirit of rock 'n' roll" still surfaces from time to time.

James Hale wrote in the Ottawa Citizen that the album's diverse range of musical styles gives the quartet an opportunity to display their skills. He said Frith's "Freedom Is Your Friends II" has "shimmering harmonic overtones", and Stewart's "Trummings" is "thrashing [and] heavily electronic". Hale remarked that Didkovsky and Lussier's contributions are "atypical" of their usual rock and blues repertoire: Didkovsky's "She Closes Her Sister with Heavy Bones" is "suffused with melancholy beauty", and Lussier's "Ayaya Moses" "shifts from brooding to brutal" with none of his usual "loopy humour". But Hale called the quartet's performance of Vivier's "Pulau Dewata" the highlight of the album, adding that it "allows the four guitarists to range from chime-like percussion to a majestic electric chorus."

Michael Rosenstein also felt that "Pulau Dewata" is Ayaya Moses's high point. Reviewing the album in Cadence magazine, he said the quartet performs Vivier's complex work "with poised energy, stepping quietly through hushed sections ... then attack[ing] [the] percussive punctuations with chiming vigor." Rosenstein opined that "through intriguing compositions [and] thoughtful improvisations", the quartet is opening up new possibilities for the electric guitar.

== Track listing ==
All music by the Fred Frith Guitar Quartet, except where noted.

No.	Title	Year composed	Length
1.	"Ayaya Moses" (René Lussier)	1994	10:42
2.	"The Stinky Boy Suite": 2. "Part 1"; 3. "Part 2"; 4. "Part 3"	1996	2:39 0:57 0:45 0:57
5.	"Geco Retile Mialgico" (Olivia Bignardi)	1995	2:12
6.	"Blind Date"	1996	1:05
7.	"Pulau Dewata" (Claude Vivier, arr. Jean René, Lussier)	1977	13:40
8.	"Trummings" (Mark Stewart)	1989	8:01
9.	"Freedom Is Your Friends II" (Fred Frith)	1994	5:00
10.	"The Why Me Suite": 10. "Part 1"; 11. "Part 2"; 12. "Part 3"	1996	3:06 1:01 1:02 1:03
13.	"She Closes Her Sister with Heavy Bones" (Nick Didkovsky)	1995	3:57
14.	"Uruk's Tablets" (Bignardi)	1995	3:55

Sources: Liner notes, Discogs.

== Personnel ==
- Fred Frith – electric guitar
- René Lussier – electric guitar
- Nick Didkovsky – electric guitar
- Mark Stewart – electric guitar

Sources: Liner notes, Discogs.

=== Sound and artwork ===
- Recorded and mixed at Studio 12, Maison Radio-Canada, Montreal, Quebec, Canada
- Recorded by Marc Fortin
- Mixed by Fortin and René Lussier
- Mastered by Denis Frenette
- Produced by Hélène Prévost
- Photography by Heike Liss
- Illustrations by Finn Timo Liss
- Graphic design by Fabrizio Gilardino

Sources: Liner notes, Discogs.
