= Step Across the Border =

1990 film by Nicolas Humbert

- VHS cover of the 1990 RecRec release
- Directed by: Nicolas Humbert; Werner Penzel
- Written by: Nicolas Humbert; Werner Penzel
- Produced by: Res Balzli
- Starring: Fred Frith; René Lussier; Iva Bittová
- Cinematography: Oscar Salgado
- Edited by: Gisela Castronari; Silvia Koller
- Music by: Fred Frith and friends
- Distributed by: RecRec (Switzerland)
- Release date: 1990
- Running time: 90 min.
- Countries: Germany; Switzerland
- Language: English

Step Across the Border is a 1990 avant-garde documentary film on English guitarist, composer and improviser Fred Frith. It was written and directed by Nicolas Humbert and Werner Penzel and released in Germany and Switzerland. The film was screened in cinemas in North America, South America, Europe and Japan, and on television in the United States, Germany, Switzerland, Austria and France. It was also released on VHS by RecRec Music (Switzerland) in 1990, and was later released on DVD by Winter & Winter Records (Germany) in 2003.

Shot in black and white, the 35mm documentary was filmed between 1988 and 1990 in Japan, Italy, France, Germany, England, the United States and Switzerland, and shows Frith rehearsing, performing, giving interviews and relaxing. Other musicians featured include René Lussier, Iva Bittová, Tom Cora, Tim Hodgkinson, Bob Ostertag and John Zorn.

The film won a "Special Mention" at the European Film Award for Best Documentary in 1990. A companion soundtrack album, Step Across the Border was also released by RecRec Music in 1990.

In January 2020 Cut Up the Border was released on CD by RogueArt. It is a sound collage created by Humbert and French sound designer, Marc Parisotto from over thirty hours of audio tape that were not used in the film.

== Description ==
Step Across the Border is subtitled:

A ninety minute celluloid improvisation by Nicolas Humbert and Werner Penzel.

"Improvisation" here refers not only to the music, but also to the film itself. Humbert and Penzel state in the 2003 DVD release of the film:

In Step Across the Border two forms of artistic expression, improvised music and cinema direct, are interrelated. In both forms it is the moment that counts, the intuitive sense of what is happening in a space. Music and film come into existence out of an intense perception of the moment, not from the transformation of a preordained plan.

The film is not narrated, and the musicians, the music and the locations are not identified. Instead it is a sequence of "snapshots" taken of Frith and musicians he has worked with, rehearsing and performing, interspersed with apparent random images of movement (trains, cars, people, grass) that blend in with the music. The improvised nature of the film and its Direct Cinema approach make it more of an art film than simply a documentary on a musician.

The music in the film is performed by Frith on his own, with others, and by others on their own. Some of the music is improvised, some is composed material performed "live", and some is previously recorded material played as accompaniment to many of the "movement" sequences in the film.

The recording of the film coincided with the formation and activity of Frith's review band Keep the Dog (1989–1991), and many of the participants of the band appear in the film. There are even a few rare glimpses of the band rehearsing. René Lussier in particular, features prominently and "interviews" Frith about his musical upbringing and approach to music.

The title of the film comes from the lyrics of the song "The Border", recorded by Skeleton Crew on their album, The Country of Blinds (1986). A brief "video" of this song also appears in the film.

== Musicians ==
Musicians appearing in the film include:

- Fred Frith
- René Lussier
- Jean Derome
- Kevin Norton
- Bob Ostertag
- Haco
- Iva Bittová
- Pavel Fajt
- Tom Cora
- Tim Hodgkinson
- John Zorn
- Eitetsu Hayashi
- Joey Baron
- Cyro Baptista
- Arto Lindsay

== Additional cast ==
- Jonas Mekas – narrator on "The Butterfly Wing Effect"
- Julia Judge – narrator on "The Sound of One Hand Clapping"
- John Spaceley – narrator on "The Sound of One Hand Clapping"
- Tom Walker – narrator on "The Sound of One Hand Clapping"
- Ted Milton – television dancer on "The Border"
- Robert Frank – old man in train

== Film locations ==
- Japan
  - Tokyo, Osaka, Kyoto
- Italy
  - Verona
- France
  - Saint-Rémy-de-Provence
- Germany
  - Leipzig
- England
  - London, Yorkshire
- United States
  - New York City
- Switzerland
  - Zurich, Bern

== Reception ==
In a review in The Boston Globe, Betsy Sherman said Step Across the Border is "a tribute to the doggedly creative spirit of those who swim against the tide of commercialized pop culture." She called Frith "an engaging subject" and a "happy pilgrim, open to inspiration and discovery". Writing in the Los Angeles Times, John Henken felt that the film's "cinematic posturing" is "at odds with Frith's pretention-free music", but added that the ambient travel-sounds have their "own voice", and blend in well with the film's "Frithian aesthetic". Henken found the final third of the documentary "compelling" and "poignant".

Reviewing the film in the San Francisco Examiner, Scott Rosenberg said Frith is "simply a guy who loves the sound of an electric guitar", and while the sounds he produces may seem a "racket ... it's a beguiling one". But he was disappointed with the filmmaker's "celluloid improvisation" where the camera appears to "wander aimlessly". Rosenberg felt that the documentary "degenerate[s] into despondent randomness" instead of focusing on Frith and his playing. "Aurally, Frith achieves something more than bare noise – but Humbert and Penzel have created cacophony's visual analog."

== Awards ==
Award	Place	Year	Result
Uppsala Filmkaja – Best Documentary Film	Sweden	1990	Won
European Film Award for Best Documentary	Europe	1990	Special Mention
Grand Prix International – Images & Documents	Portugal	1990	Nominated
Golden Gate Award	San Francisco	1991	Special Jury Award

- In 2000 the film was chosen as one of the 100 most important movies in film-history by critics of Cahiers du cinéma, Paris

== Home media release ==
In 2003, Winter & Winter Records (Germany) released Step Across the Border on DVD. It contained a slightly shortened version of the original film, plus 12 "bonus tracks" and a trailer of Middle of the Moment, another documentary film by Nicolas Humbert and Werner Penzel, with music by Fred Frith (released on the soundtrack, Middle of the Moment).

A few segments totalling about seven minutes were removed from the original film, including the "video" of the song "The Border" by Skeleton Crew, and Keep the Dog rehearsing "Norrgården Nyvla".

=== Bonus tracks ===
The "bonus tracks" are outtakes and many feature additional shots of scenes in the film.

1. John Dee Holeman – Gromes Hotel, New York City, February 1989
2. Charles Hayward – Rehearsal room backyard, Leipzig, October 1988
3. Arto Lindsay – Rehearsal room, Leipzig, October 1988
4. Fred Frith – Selluloid Restaurant, Osaka, January 1988
5. Fred Frith and Tom Cora – Rehearsal at The Kitchen, New York City, February 1989
6. Fred Frith, René Lussier, Jean Derome and Kevin Norton – Rehearsal at The Roulette, New York City, February 1989
7. Cyro Baptista – Reheasal room, New York City, February 1989
8. Fred Frith and John Zorn – Rehearsal at The Kitchen, New York City, February 1989
9. Fred Frith and Tim Hodgkinson – Rehearsal at Hodgkinson's house, Brixton, London, December 1988
10. Fred Frith – Concert at the Muse, Osaka, January 1988
11. Fred Frith – Frith's apartment (recalling some of his compositions), New York City, January 1989
12. Joey Baron – Baron's house, Hoboken, New Jersey, January 1989

== Soundtrack ==
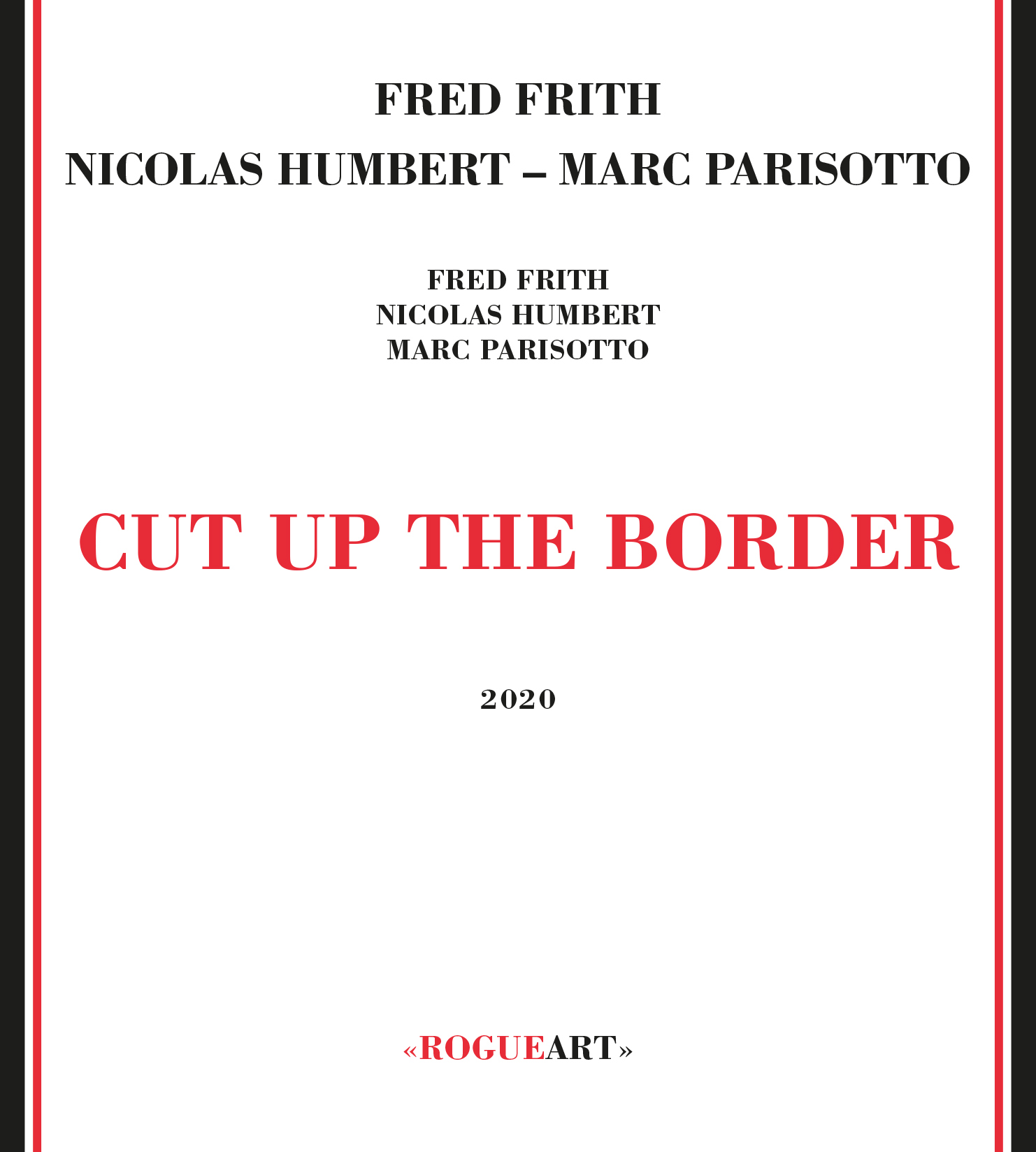
Cut Up the Border album cover

== Cut Up the Border ==
Some thirty years after Step Across the Border was released, director Humbert reviewed over thirty hours of audio tape that were not used in the film. Humbert and French sound designer, Marc Parisotto used these tapes to create a sound collage of ambient noise and performances by Frith, Cora, Ted Milton, Bittová, Haco and Zorn. The result was presented at a Berlin cinema in January 2019 with Frith improvising live on guitar over the sound piece. The performance was recorded and broadcast by Deutschlandfunk in February 2019. In January 2020, RogueArt released the radio broadcast on CD entitled Cut Up the Border and credited to Fred Frith, Nicolas Humbert and Marc Parisotto.

== Works cited ==
- Nicolas Humbert and Werner Penzel, Step Across the Border (VHS, RecRec Music, 1990)
- Nicolas Humbert and Werner Penzel, Step Across the Border (DVD, Winter & Winter Records, 2003)
