= Keep the Dog =

American experimental rock band

- Origin: New York City, United States
- Genres: Avant-rock, experimental, free improvisation
- Years active: 1989–1991
- Labels: Fred
- Past members: Jean Derome; Fred Frith; René Lussier; Kevin Norton; Bob Ostertag; Zeena Parkins; Charles Hayward

Keep the Dog was an American-based experimental rock touring band from New York City formed in 1989 by English multi-instrumentalist, composer and improvisor Fred Frith. The sextet was conceived as a review band for performing selections of Frith's repertoire of compositions from the previous 15 years.

The band lineup was Frith, René Lussier, Jean Derome, Zeena Parkins, Bob Ostertag and Kevin Norton. Later Charles Hayward replaced Norton. The group existed until mid-1991, performing live in Europe, North America and the former Soviet Union. A double CD, That House We Lived In, from their final 1991 European tour, was released in 2003.

== History ==
Keep the Dog was formed in 1989 to perform selections of Frith's repertoire of compositions from the previous 15 years. The lineup was Frith, René Lussier, Jean Derome, Zeena Parkins, Bob Ostertag and Kevin Norton. Later Charles Hayward replaced Norton. Experimental sound artist Ostertag had retired from music in the early 1980s and had to be persuaded by Frith to join the band. Ostertag had to catch up on new developments in musical technology, in particular the use of MIDI and digital samplers.

Keep the Dog began purely as a review band, performing pieces from Frith's solo albums, from some of the groups he belonged to (Henry Cow, Massacre, Skeleton Crew and French Frith Kaiser Thompson), and from his many collaborations with other musicians. But as the group grew in stature it started extending itself. Instead of simply covering Frith's compositions, they began to adapt them and improvise around them. By 1991, Keep the Dog had become largely an improvising band. Frith remarked in an interview at the time: "The group is constantly evolving into things we don't expect."

During the band's three-year existence they toured extensively, performing in the United States, Canada, mainland Europe and the former Soviet Union. They also played at a number of festivals, including the 7th Festival International de Musique Actuelle de Victoriaville in Victoriaville, Quebec, Canada in October 1989. Every concert was different: Frith often juggled the material around and in some cases re-arranged it, for example if a venue provided a piano. While remaining a sextet throughout, they were occasionally joined on stage by guest musicians, including Tom Cora, John Zorn and Tenko Ueno.

Being a touring band, Keep the Dog never went to the studio, but every concert they performed was recorded on DAT. While bootleg recordings of some of the concerts soon began circulating, Frith never considered officially releasing their work until a decade after the band stopped performing. In a 2003 interview, Frith said:

It was more that none of us were convinced the material was good enough, and we were all busy with other things so we kind of forgot about it. When Jon Leidecker saw the tapes in my office he flipped and said "I'll do it" and it was his energy and enthusiasm that got the ball rolling again (not to mention his editing skills).

Leidecker sifted though about 20 DAT recordings from the band's final performances in Austria, Germany and Italy in May and June 1991, and built a montage which he passed on to Frith for further editing. The result was a double CD, That House We Lived In, which was released on Frith's own Fred Records in 2003. Frith remarked in the album's liner notes:

Listening now I'm struck by the fact that the members of this band are not only what the press described at the time as "sharp improvisers" but also, everyone of them, wonderful composers as well. I raise my glass to them with love and gratitude.

That House We Lived In was generally well received by critics. Beppe Colli wrote in a review at Clouds and Clocks that Keep the Dog plays Frith's material "with a freshness, assurance and creativity" that demonstrates how well the sextet work together. Reviewing the album at AllMusic, François Couture opined that it is "a must" for enthusiasts of Frith's "livelier, more vivacious writing". Writing in Sonic Transports: New Frontiers in Our Music (1990), Nicole V. Gagné said Keep the Dog's music takes Skeleton Crew's "precision and extended, non-stop playing to epic heights".

== Members ==
- Fred Frith – guitar, bass guitar, violin, voice
- René Lussier – guitar, bass guitar
- Jean Derome – alto saxophone, baritone saxophone, flute, voice
- Zeena Parkins – accordion, electric harp, piano, synthesizer, voice
- Bob Ostertag – sampling keyboard
- Kevin Norton – drums, percussion, voice
- Charles Hayward – drums, percussion, voice

== Discography ==
Live albums

- 2003 – That House We Lived In (2xCD, Fred Records, UK)

Other album appearances

- 1992 – Various artists: Angelica 91 (CD, CAICAI Music, Italy) – includes two Keep the Dog tracks {"Huge Bored Uncle", "Vie en Mimosa") recorded live at the Angelica Italian jazz festival, May 2, 1991.
