= Mark Stewart (American musician) =

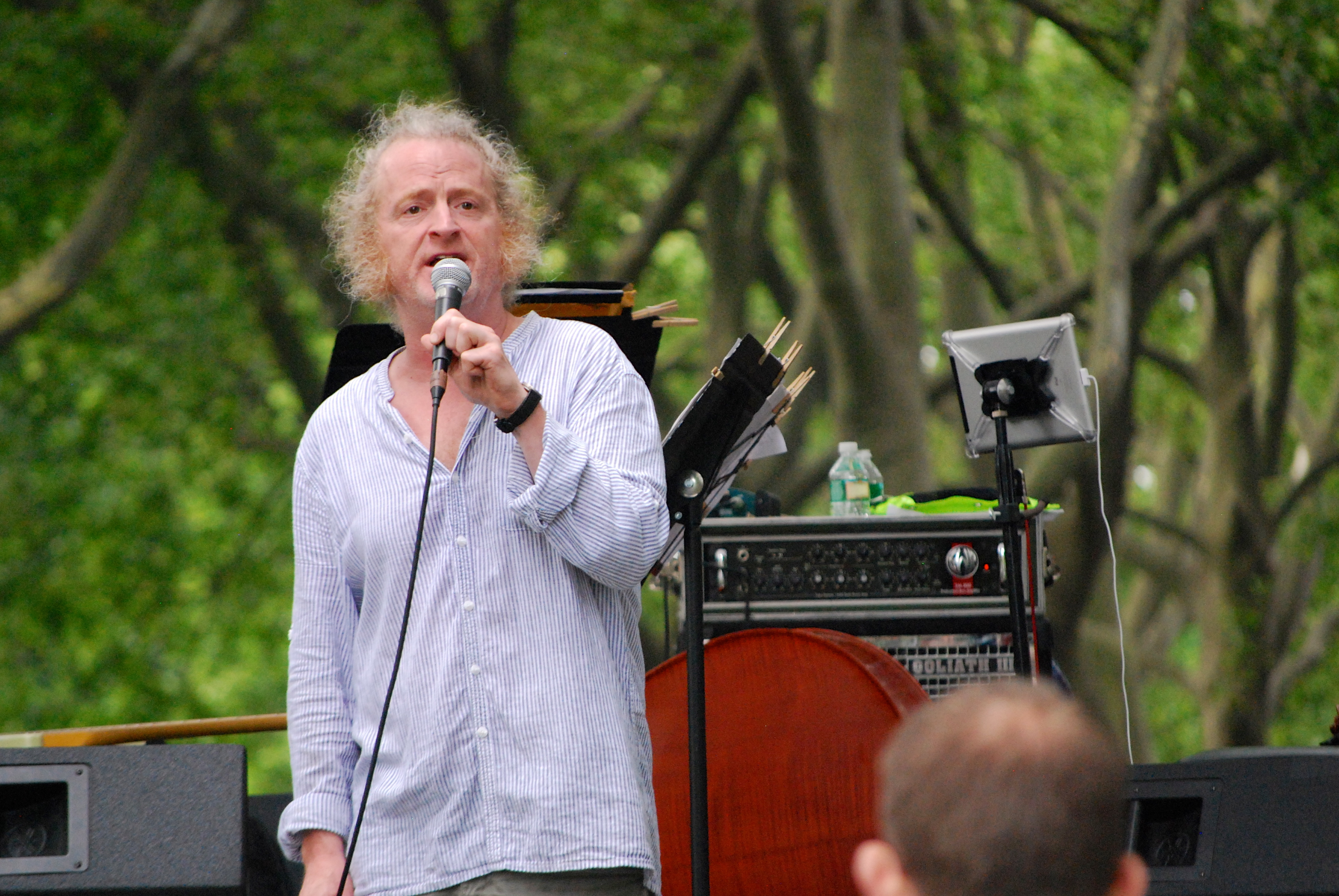
- In Governors Island in 2013

Background information
- Origin: New York City, New York, United States
- Occupations: Multi-instrumentalist, composer, singer, instrument designer
- Instruments: Guitar, daxophone, theremin, cello, baritone saxophone

Mark Stewart is a New York City-based multi-instrumentalist, composer, singer and instrument designer.

He has been a member of the Bang on a Can All-Stars, the Fred Frith Guitar Quartet, Steve Reich and Musicians, Zeena Parkins' Gangster Band, and Arnold Dreyblatt's Orchestra of Excited Strings. Stewart is a founding member of the Bang on a Can All-Stars band and The Jerry Wortman Nonette. Also, he has worked with Paul Simon, Anthony Braxton, Bob Dylan, Cecil Taylor, Meredith Monk, Philip Glass, Bruce Springsteen, Edie Brickell, Don Byron, Paul McCartney, Marc Ribot, and in the duo Polygraph Lounge with Rob Schwimmer, with whom he also contributed to Simon & Garfunkel's "Old Friends" reunion concert tour. He plays many experimental and lesser-used instruments, such as the daxophone, slide didgeridoo, theremin.

Stewart was raised in Appleton, Wisconsin and now lives in Brooklyn, New York.

== Selected discography ==
With Bang on a Can

- Bang on a Can Live, Vol. 2 (Composers Recordings Inc., 1993)
- Bang on a Can Live, Vol. 3 (Composers Recordings Inc., 1994)
- Industry (Sony Classical, 1995)
- Cheating, Lying, Stealing (Sony Classical, 1996)
- Music For Airports - Brian Eno (Point Music, 1998)
- Renegade Heaven (Cantaloupe, 2000)
- Steve Reich: New York Counterpoint; Eight Lines; Four Organs (Nonesuch, 2000)
- Terry Riley - In C (Cantaloupe, 2001)
- Classics (Cantaloupe, 2002)
- Bang On A Can & Don Byron - A Ballad For Many (Cantaloupe, 2006)

With Fred Frith Guitar Quartet

- Ayaya Moses (1997, CD, Ambiances Magnétiques, Canada) - e-guitar
- Upbeat (1999, CD, Ambiances Magnétiques, Canada) - e-guitar

With Paul Simon

- You're The One (Warner Bros., 2000) - dobro, banjo, sitar, cello, trumpet, pedal steel
- So Beautiful or So What (Hear Music, 2011) - saxophone, vocals, wind instruments, e-guitar
- Live In New York City (Hear Music, 2012 - e-guitar, saxophone, wind instruments

With Zeena Parkins

- Mouth=Maul=Betrayer (Tzadik, 1996) - guitar, mandolin, cello
- Pan-Acousticon (Tzadik, 1999) - guitar, cello, daxophone

With Ted Reichman

- Emigré (Tzadik, 2003) - e-guitar, cello, mandocello, tenor banjo

With Evan Ziporyn

- Gamelan Galak Tika (New World Records, 2000) - e-guitar, metallophone
- Amok!, Tire Fire (New World Records, 2000) - e-guitar, metallophone
- ShadowBang (Cantaloupe Music, 2003) - e-guitar
