= Fred Frith =

English multi-instrumentalist, composer and improviser (born 1949)

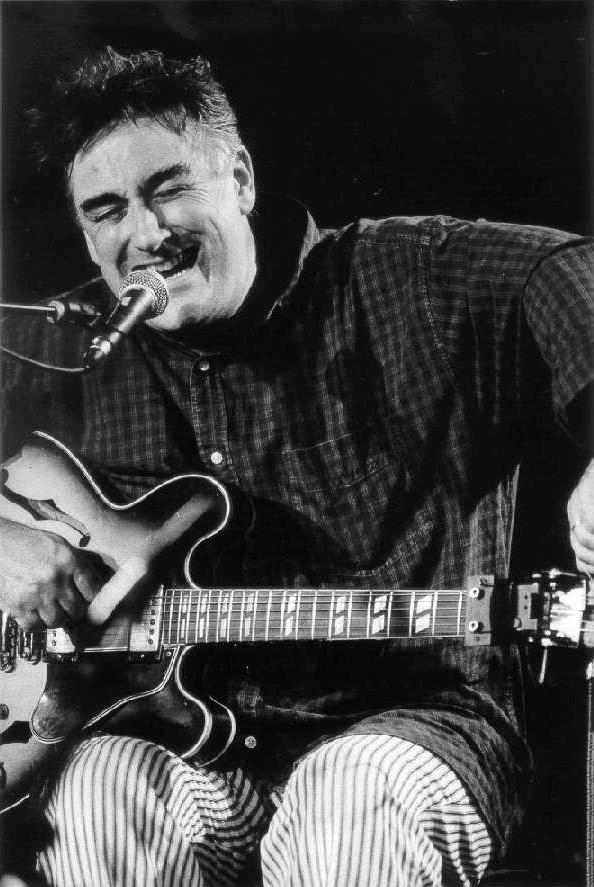
- Frith at the Moers Festival, June 1998

Background information
- Born: Jeremy Webster Frith; 17 February 1949 (age 77); Heathfield, Sussex, England
- Genres: Avant-rock; experimental; free improvisation; contemporary classical
- Occupations: Musician; composer; educator
- Instruments: Guitar; bass guitar; violin; keyboards
- Works: Fred Frith discography
- Years active: 1968–present
- Labels: Caroline; Moers; Ralph; RecRec; Recommended; Fred; Tzadik; Winter & Winter; Intakt
- Website: fredfrith.com

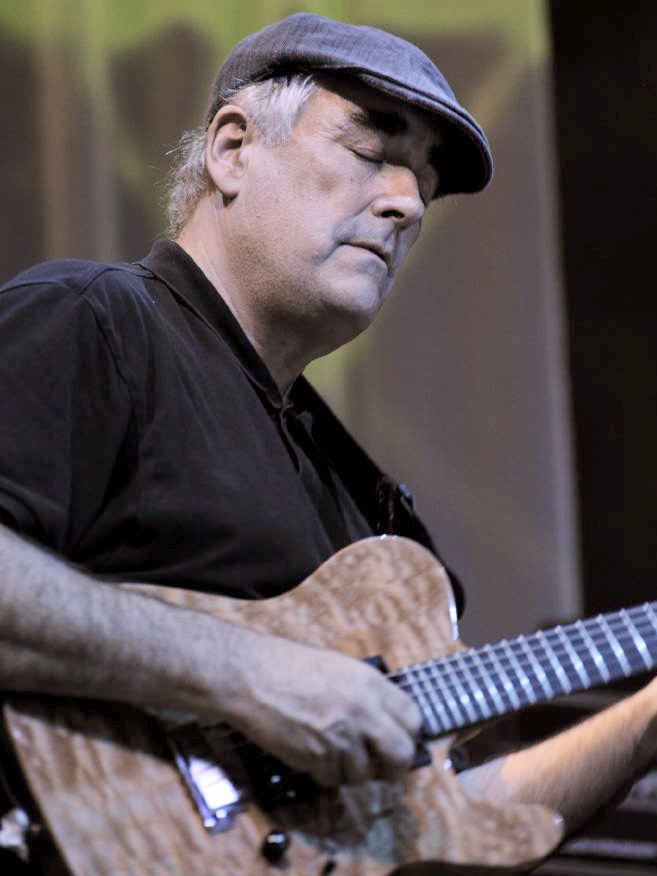
Frith at the Moers Festival, 2010

Jeremy Webster "Fred" Frith (born 17 February 1949) is an English multi-instrumentalist, composer, and improviser. Best known for his guitar playing, Frith first came to attention as a founding member of the English avant-rock group Henry Cow. He was also a member of the groups Art Bears, Massacre, and Skeleton Crew. He has collaborated with numerous musicians, including Robert Wyatt, Derek Bailey, the Residents, Lol Coxhill, John Zorn, Brian Eno, Mike Patton, Lars Hollmer, Bill Laswell, Iva Bittová, Jad Fair, Kramer, the ARTE Quartett, and Bob Ostertag. He has also composed several long works, including Traffic Continues (1996, performed 1998 by Frith and Ensemble Modern) and Freedom in Fragments (1993, performed 1999 by Rova Saxophone Quartet). Frith produces most of his own music, and has also produced many albums by other musicians, including Curlew, the Muffins, Etron Fou Leloublan, and Orthotonics.

He is the subject of Nicolas Humbert and Werner Penzel's 1990 documentary Step Across the Border. Frith also appears in the Canadian documentary Act of God, which is about the metaphysical effects of being struck by lightning. He has contributed to a number of music publications, including New Musical Express and Trouser Press, and has conducted improvising workshops across the world. His career spans over four decades and he appears on over 400 albums, and he still performs actively throughout the world.

Frith was awarded the 2008 Demetrio Stratos Prize for his career achievements in experimental music. The prize was established in 2005 in honour of experimental vocalist Demetrio Stratos, of the Italian group Area, who died in 1979. In 2010 Frith received an honorary doctorate from the University of Huddersfield in West Yorkshire, England, in recognition of his contribution to music. Frith was Professor of Composition in the Music Department at Mills College in Oakland, California, until his retirement in 2018. He is the brother of Simon Frith, a music critic and sociologist, and Chris Frith, a psychologist at University College London.

== Musical career ==
Frith was born in Heathfield in East Sussex, England into a family where music was considered an essential part of life. He was given the nickname "Fred" at school after the motorcycle road racer Freddie Frith. Frith started violin lessons at the age of five and became a member of his school orchestra, but at 13 switched to guitar after watching a group imitating a popular instrumental band at the time, the Shadows. He decided to learn how to play guitar and get into a band. Frith taught himself guitar from a book of guitar chords and soon found himself in a school group called the Chaperones, playing Shadows and Beatles covers. However, when he started hearing blues music from the likes of Snooks Eaglin and Alexis Korner it changed his whole approach to the guitar, and by the time he was 15, the Chaperones had become a blues band. Frith's first public performances were in 1967 in folk clubs in northern England, where he sang and played traditional and blues songs.

Besides the blues, Frith started listening to any music that had guitar in it, including folk, classical, ragtime, and flamenco. He also listened to Indian, Japanese, and Balinese music and was particularly drawn to East European music after a Yugoslav schoolfriend taught him folk tunes from his home. Frith went to Cambridge University in 1967, where his musical horizons were expanded further by the philosophies of John Cage and Frank Zappa's manipulation of rock music. Frith graduated from Christ's College, Cambridge, with a BA (English literature) in 1970 (and by Cambridge custom received a pro forma MA in 1974), but the real significance of Cambridge for him was that the seminal avant-rock group Henry Cow formed there.

=== Henry Cow ===
Frith met Tim Hodgkinson, a fellow student, in a blues club at Cambridge University in 1968. "We'd never met before, and he had an alto sax, and I had my violin, and we just improvised this ghastly screaming noise for about half an hour." Something clicked and, recognizing their mutual open-minded approach to music, Frith and Hodgkinson formed a band there and then. They called it Henry Cow and they remained with the band until its demise in 1978.

Frith composed a number of the band's notable pieces, including "Nirvana for Mice" and "Ruins". While guitar was his principal instrument, he also played violin (drawing on his classical training), bass guitar, piano, and xylophone.

In November 1973, Frith (and other members of Henry Cow) participated in a live-in-the-studio performance of Mike Oldfield's Tubular Bells for the BBC. It is available on Oldfield's Elements DVD.

=== Guitar Solos ===
After Henry Cow's first album, Frith released Guitar Solos in 1974, his first solo album and a glimpse at what he had been doing with his guitar. The album comprised eight tracks of unaccompanied and improvised music played on prepared guitars. It was recorded in four days, at the Kaleidophon Studios in London's Camden Town, without any overdubbing.

When it was released, Guitar Solos was considered a landmark album because of its innovative and experimental approach to guitar playing. The January 1983 edition of DownBeat magazine remarked that Guitar Solos "... must have stunned listeners of the day. Even today that album stands up as uniquely innovative and undeniably daring." It also attracted the attention of some musicians, including Brian Eno, resulting in Frith playing guitar on two of Eno's albums, Before and After Science (1977) and Music for Films (1978).

Between October and December 1974, Frith contributed a series of ten articles to the British weekly music newspaper New Musical Express entitled "Great Rock Solos of Our Time". In them he analysed prominent rock guitarists of the day and their contribution to the development of the rock guitar, including Jimi Hendrix, Eric Clapton and Frank Zappa.

=== Post-Henry Cow ===
While recording Henry Cow's last album, differences emerged between the group members over the album's content. Frith and Chris Cutler favoured song-oriented material, while Hodgkinson and Lindsay Cooper wanted purely instrumental compositions. As a compromise, Frith and Cutler agreed, early in 1978, to release the songs already created on their own album, Hopes and Fears, under the name Art Bears (with Dagmar Krause). The instrumental material was recorded by Henry Cow on Western Culture later that year, after which the band split. The Art Bears trio continued purely as a studio group until 1981, releasing two more albums, Winter Songs in 1979 and The World as It Is Today in 1981.

During this time Frith also released Gravity (1980), his second solo album, recorded at Norrgården Nyvla in Uppsala, Sweden with Swedish group Samla Mammas Manna, and at the Catch-a-Buzz studio in Rockville, Maryland with United States band The Muffins. It showed Frith breaking free from the highly structured and orchestrated music of Henry Cow and experimenting with folk and dance music. "Norrgården Nyvla" was also the title of one of the tracks on the album and is considered one of Frith's most recognisable tunes.

=== New York ===
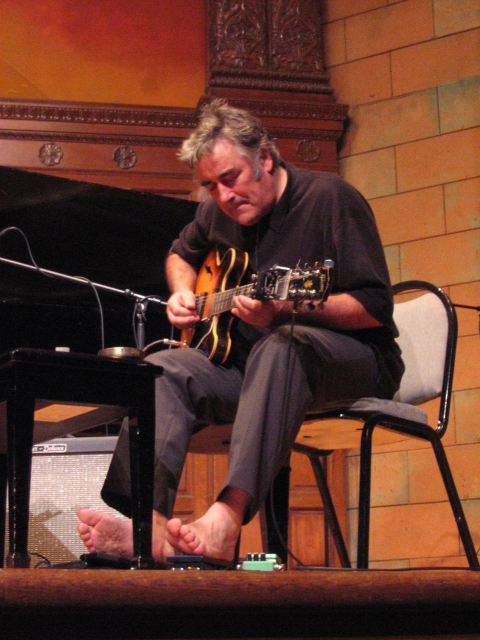
Fred Frith performing at Mills College, Oakland, California in October 2005

Towards the end of 1979, Frith relocated to New York City, where he immediately hooked up with the local avant-garde/downtown music scene. The impact on him was uplifting: "... New York was a profoundly liberating experience for me; for the first time I felt that I could be myself and not try to live up to what I imagined people were thinking about me." Frith met and began recording with a number of musicians and groups, including Henry Kaiser (With Friends Like These, Who Needs Enemies?), Bob Ostertag (Getting a Head, Voice of America), Tom Cora, Eugene Chadbourne, Zeena Parkins, Ikue Mori, the Residents, Material, the Golden Palominos, and Curlew. He spent some 14 years in New York, during which time he joined a few bands, including John Zorn's Naked City (in which Frith played bass) and French Frith Kaiser Thompson (consisting of John French, Frith, Henry Kaiser and Richard Thompson). Frith also started three bands himself, namely Massacre, Skeleton Crew, and Keep the Dog.

Massacre was formed in 1980 with bassist Bill Laswell and drummer Fred Maher. A high energy experimental rock band, they toured the United States and Europe in 1980 and 1981, and released one album, Killing Time (1981), recorded at Martin Bisi's later-to-be historic studio in Brooklyn. Massacre split in 1981 when Maher left, but later reformed again in 1998 when drummer Charles Hayward joined. The new Massacre released three more albums.

Skeleton Crew, a collaboration with Tom Cora from 1982 to 1986, was an experimental group noted for its live improvisations where Frith (guitar, violin, keyboards, drums) and Cora (cello, bass guitar, homemade drums and contraptions) played a number of instruments simultaneously. They performed extensively across Europe, North America and Japan and released Learn to Talk in 1984. Zeena Parkins (electric harp and keyboards) joined in 1984 and the trio released The Country of Blinds in 1986. In October 1983 Skeleton Crew joined Duck and Cover, a commission from the Berlin Jazz Festival, for a performance in West Berlin, followed by another in February 1984 in East Berlin.

Frith formed Keep the Dog in 1989, a sextet and review band for performing selections of his extensive repertoire of compositions from the previous 15 years. The lineup was Frith (guitar, violin, bass guitar), René Lussier (guitar, bass guitar), Jean Derome (winds), Zeena Parkins (piano, synthesizer, harp, accordion), Bob Ostertag (sampling keyboard), and Kevin Norton (drums, percussion). Later Charles Hayward replaced Norton on drums. The group existed until mid-1991, performing live in Europe, North America and the former Soviet Union. A double CD, That House We Lived In, from their final performances in Austria, Germany and Italy in May and June 1991, was released in 2003.

=== Other projects ===
During the 1980s, Frith began writing music for dance, film, and theatre, and a number of his solo albums from this time reflect this genre, including The Technology of Tears (And Other Music for Dance and Theatre) (1988), Middle of the Moment (1995), Allies (Music for Dance, Volume 2) (1996), and Rivers and Tides (2003). Exploring new forms of composition, Frith also experimented with chance or accidental compositions, often created by building music around "found sounds" and field recordings, examples of which can be found on Accidental (Music for Dance, Volume 3) (2002) and Prints: Snapshots, Postcards, Messages and Miniatures, 1987–2001 (2002). He was featured in 'Crossing Bridges', a 1983 music programme based around jazz guitar improvisation, and broadcast by Channel 4

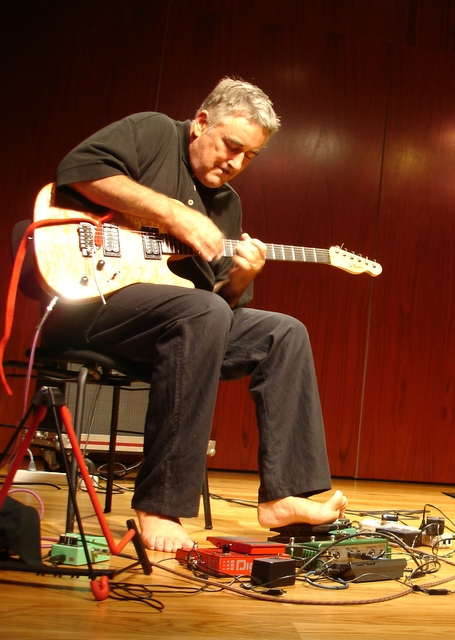
Fred Frith performing in Lisbon in August 2006.

As a composer, Frith began composing works for other musicians and groups in the late 1980s, including the Rova Saxophone Quartet, Ensemble Modern, and Arditti Quartet. He composed and performed the song "Choral Ode 2" for the 1993 opera Agamemnon. In the late 1990s, Frith established his own Fred Frith Guitar Quartet consisting of Frith, René Lussier, Nick Didkovsky, and Mark Stewart. Their guitar music, varying from "tuneful and pretty, to noisy, aggressive and quite challenging", appears on two albums, Ayaya Moses (1997) and Upbeat (1999), both on Lussier's own Ambiances Magnétiques label.

The ex-Henry Cow members have always maintained close contact with each other and Frith still collaborates with many of them, including Chris Cutler and Tim Hodgkinson. Cutler and Frith have been touring Europe, Asia, and the Americas since 1978, and have given dozens of duo performances. Three albums from some of these concerts have been released by Recommended Records. In December 2006, Cutler, Frith, and Hodgkinson performed together at the Stone in New York City, their first concert performance since Henry Cow's demise in 1978.

In 1995, Frith moved to Stuttgart in Germany to live with his wife, German photographer Heike Liss, and their children Finn and Lucia. Between 1994 and 1996, Frith was composer-in-residence at L'Ecole Nationale de Musique in Villeurbanne, France.

Frith relocated to the United States in 1997 to become Composer-in-Residence at Mills College in Oakland, California. In 1999 he was appointed the Luther B. Marchant Professor of Composition in the Music Department at Mills, where he taught composition, contemporary performance and improvisation. He is currently Professor Emeritus of Music at Mills, after having retired in 2018. While Frith had never studied music in college, his credentials of over forty years of continuous practice and self-discovery got him the position. He has, however, maintained that "most of my students are better qualified to teach composition than I am," and that he learns as much from them as they learn from him.

In March 1997 Frith formed the electro-acoustic improvisation and experimental trio Maybe Monday with saxophonist Larry Ochs from Rova Saxophone Quartet and koto player Miya Masaoka. Between 1997 and 2008, they toured the United States, Canada, and Europe, and released three albums. In March 2008, Frith formed Cosa Brava, an experimental rock and improvisation quintet with Zeena Parkins from Skeleton Crew and Keep the Dog, Carla Kihlstedt and Matthias Bossi from Sleepytime Gorilla Museum, and the Norman Conquest. They toured Europe in April 2008, and performed at the 25th Festival International de Musique Actuelle de Victoriaville in Victoriaville, Quebec, Canada, the following month.

In 2013, Frith formed the Fred Frith Trio in Oakland, California, an improvising group with bassist Jason Hoopes and drummer/percussionist Jordan Glenn, both from the Oakland experimental song group Jack O' The Clock. The Trio toured Europe in February 2015, recorded a studio album, Another Day in Fucking Paradise, in January 2016, and toured Europe again in February 2017. The album was well received by music critics. In January 2018 the trio recorded their second album, Closer to the Ground, which was released in September 2018.

Frith supplied guitar to the albums The Fates (2013) and Folklore (2017) by Matthew Edwards and the Unfortunates.

Frith has also collaborated with a number of prominent musicians, including Robert Wyatt, Derek Bailey, Lol Coxhill, Lars Hollmer, and the Scottish deaf percussionist Dame Evelyn Glennie.

=== Step Across the Border ===
Step Across the Border is a 1990 documentary film on Fred Frith, written and directed by Nicolas Humbert and Werner Penzel, and released in Germany and Switzerland. It was filmed in Japan, Europe, and the United States, and also features musicians René Lussier, Iva Bittová, Tom Cora, Tim Hodgkinson, Bob Ostertag, and John Zorn.

=== Fred Records ===
In 2002, Fred Frith created his own record label, Fred Records, an imprint of Recommended Records, to re-release his back catalogue of recordings and previously unreleased material.

== Personal life ==
During the early years of Henry Cow, Frith was married to Liza White, a teacher in Cambridge. They wed in 1970, but divorced in 1974 after Frith's commitment to the band left little private life for the couple. In the early- to mid-1980s, after Henry Cow had split up and Frith had moved to New York City, he was married to Tina Curran, a musician and artist. She played bass guitar on several tracks on Frith's albums at the time, and did the photography and artwork for a number of his albums during that period. In the early 1990s Frith married German photographer and performance artist, Heike Liss. She has done the artwork for many of Frith's albums, and has performed with him on several occasions. They lived in Germany in the mid-1990s, then moved to California where Frith taught at Mills College until his retirement in 2018.

== Musical style and instruments ==
=== Guitars and playing technique ===
Fred Frith has used a number of different guitars, including homemade instruments, over the years, depending on the type of music he is playing. For the more structured and refined music he has often used a Gibson ES-345, for example on his solo album, Gravity. For the heavier "rock" sound, as in Massacre, he has used an old 1961 solid body Burns guitar, created by the British craftsman Jim Burns. On his landmark Guitar Solos album, Frith used a modified 1936 Gibson K-11 guitar (q.v. for details).

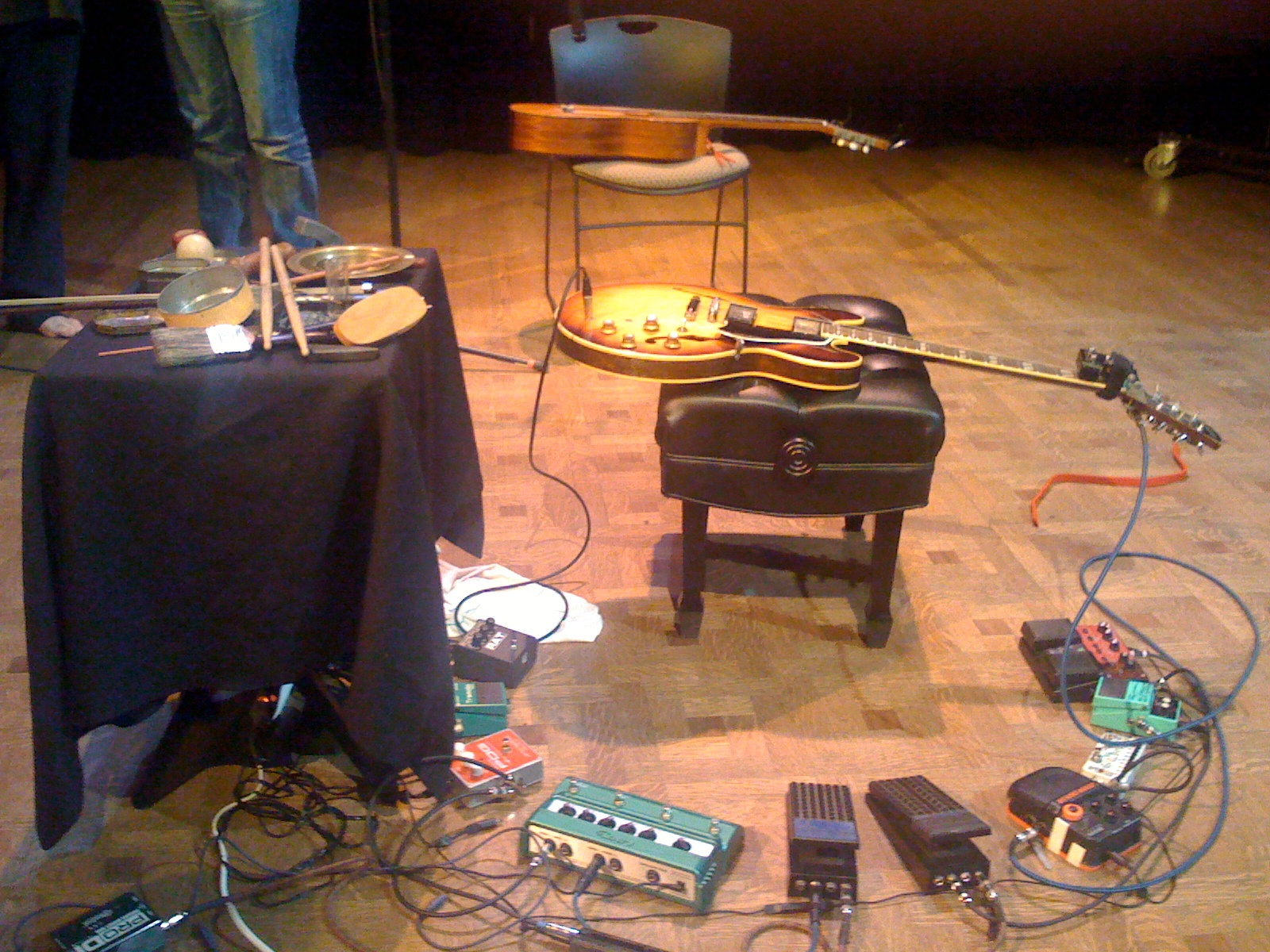
Fred Frith's setup in April 2009.

For Frith's early unstructured music, as with Henry Kaiser on With Friends Like These, and his early table-top guitar solo performances, he used a homemade six- and eight-string double-neck guitar created by a friend, Charles Fletcher. Frith told DownBeat magazine in 1983: "It was the one and only guitar that he ever built ... he constructed it mainly out of old pieces from other guitars that I had, and for the body I think he used an old door." The possibilities offered by homemade instruments prompted Frith to start creating his own guitars, basically slabs of wood on which he mounted a pickup, a bridge, and strings stretched over metal screws. "The basic design of the instrument is supposed to be as rudimentary and flexible as possible," Frith said, "so I can use an electric drill to bore holes into the body of it to achieve certain sounds ... ."

Frith uses a variety of implements to play guitar, from traditional guitar picks to violin bows, drum sticks, egg beaters, paint brushes, lengths of metal chain, and other found objects. Frith remarked: "It's more to do with my interest in found objects and the use of certain kinds of textures which have an effect on the string ... the difference between the touch of stone, the touch of glass, the touch of wood, the touch of paper – those kinds of basic elements that you're using against the surface of the strings which produce different sounds."

In a typical solo improvising concert, Frith would lay a couple of his homemade guitars flat on a table and play them with a collection of found objects (varying from concert to concert). He would drop objects, like ball bearings, dried beans, and rice on the strings while stroking, scraping, and hitting them with whatever was on hand. Later he added a live sampler to his on-stage equipment, which he controlled with pedals. The sampler enabled him to dynamically capture and loop guitar sounds, over which he would capture and loop new sounds, and so on, until he had a bed of repeated patterns on top of which he would then begin his solo performance.

=== Effects and amplification ===
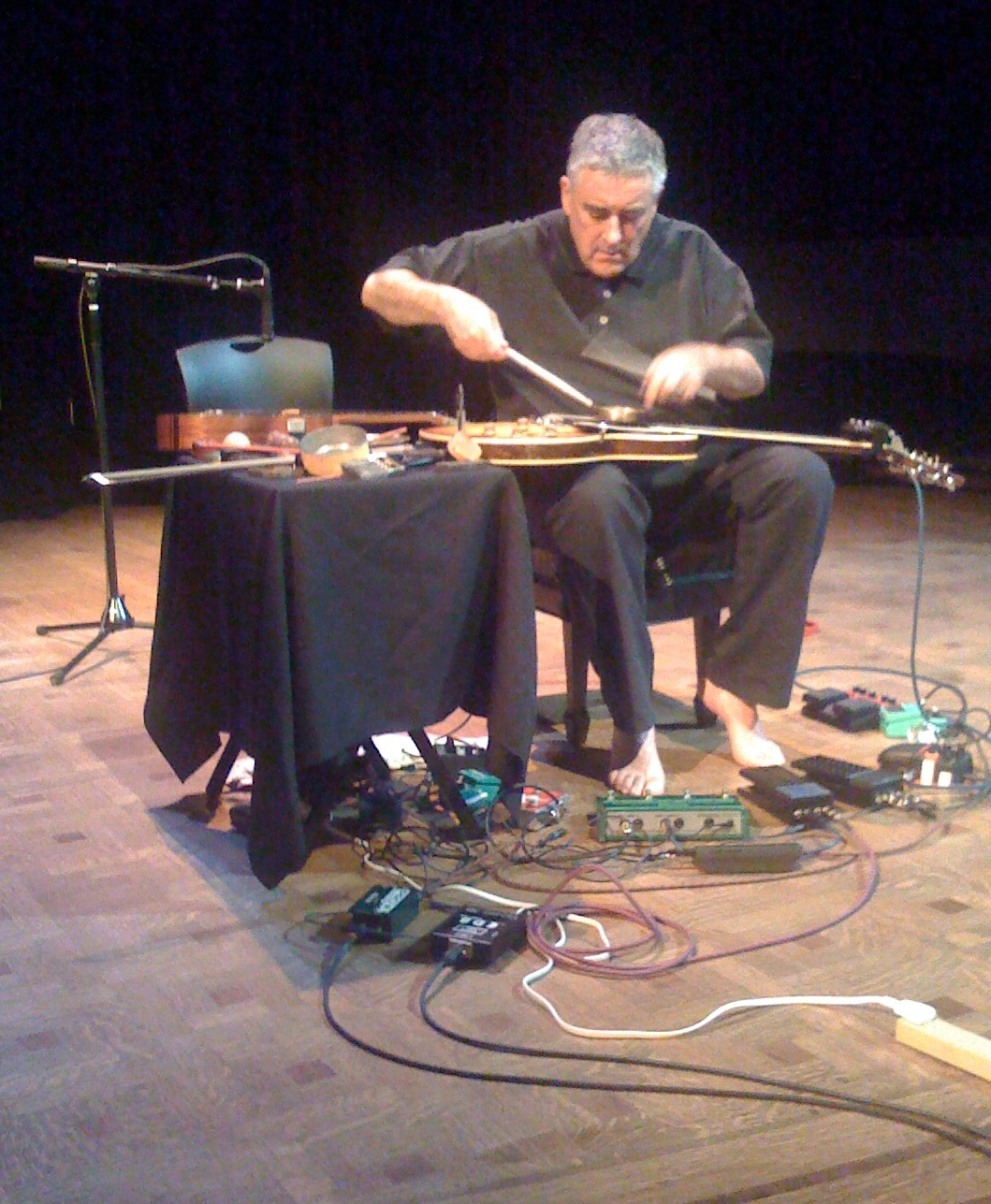
Fred Frith performing in Seattle in April 2009.

Effect pedals

- Pro Co RAT distortion
- Boss FV-50L volume foot controller
- Boss RC20-XL Looper
- DigiTech Whammy 4
- Line 6 DL4 delay
- EBow
- Electroharmonix POG

Amplification

- Fender Amplifiers

== Compositions ==
Since the late 1980s, Fred Frith has composed a number of longer works. The following is a selection (years indicating time of composition).

- The As Usual Dance Towards the Other Flight to What is Not (1989) – for four electric guitars
- Helter Skelter (1990) – for two sopranos, contralto, and a large electric ensemble
- Stick Figures (1990) – for six guitars and two players
- Lelekovice (1991) – (for Iva Bittová) string quartet no. 1
- Stone, Brick, Glass, Wood, Wire (1992) – graphic scores for any number of players
- Freedom in Fragments (1993) – a suite of 23 pieces for saxophone quartet
- The Previous Evening (1993) – a tribute to John Cage for four clarinets, tapes, bass, footsteps, electric guitars, whirled objects, and voice
- Elegy for Elias (1993) – for piano, violin, and marimba
- Pacifica (1994) – a meditation for 21 musicians with texts by Pablo Neruda
- Seven Circles (1995) – for piano
- Impur (1996) – for 100 musicians, large building, and mobile audience
- Shortened Suite (1996) – for trumpet, oboe, cello, and marimba
- Back to Life (1997) – for trumpet, oboe, cello, and marimba
- Traffic Continues: Gusto (1998) – for large ensemble with improvising soloists
- Landing for Choir (2001) – for Flamenco singer, cello, saxophone, and samples
- Allegory (2002) – for string quartet and electric guitar
- Fell (2002) – for string quartet and electric guitar
- The Happy End Problem (2003) – for flute, bassoon, gu zheng, percussion, violin, and electronics
- The Right Angel (2003) – for orchestra and electric guitar
- Save As (2005) – for cello and percussion
- Snakes and Ladders (2006) – for clarinet, electric guitar, piano, percussion, cello, and double bass
- Episodes (2007) – for Baroque orchestra
- Water Stories (2007) – for clarinet, piano, percussion, violin, and cello
- For Nothing (2008) – for contralto and Baroque string quartet
- Fair (2008) – for guitar quartet
- Small Time (2009) – for percussion quartet
- Rocket Science (2012) – (clarinet/bass clarinet, bassoon, viola, electric guitar, percussion, and piano/keys
- What Happens (2015) – percussion quartet and prepared piano
- If I Could (2015) – clarinet, viola, electric guitar, piano, vibraphone, and mezzo-soprano
- Episodes for Orchestra (for Amanda Miller) (2007/2015) – Baroque orchestra
- Calle Calle (2016) – flute, saxophone and electronics
- Coulda Woulda Shoulda (2016) – viola solo
- Zena (2017) – for clarinet, flute, piano, percussion, violin, viola, and cello
- Rags of Time (2018) – for girl's chorus, percussion and keyboards

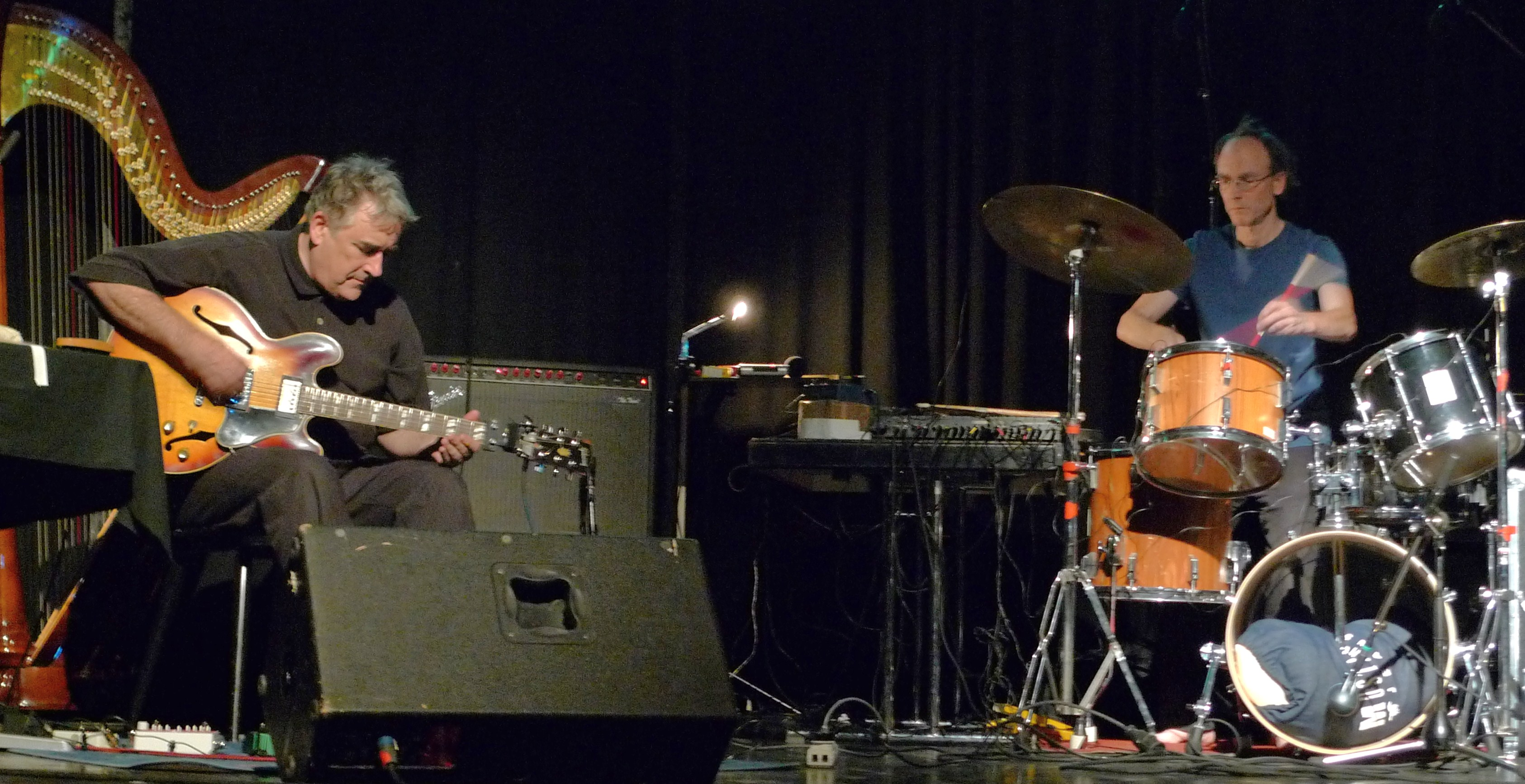
Fred Frith (left) and Chris Cutler performing in Austria in November 2009.

== Discography ==
Fred Frith appears on over 400 recordings: with bands, in collaboration with other musicians, solo, albums he produced for other bands and musicians, and albums featuring his composed work performed by others.

== Documentaries ==
- 1990 Step Across the Border – a documentary on Frith by Nicolas Humbert and Werner Penzel
- 1991 Streetwise – by Charles Castella about Frith's work in Marseille with "unemployed rock musicians"
- 2000 Le voyage immobile – about Frith's trio with Louis Sclavis and Jean-Pierre Drouet for France 3 national TV
- 2004 Touch the Sound – by Thomas Riedelsheimer about Scottish percussionist Evelyn Glennie and her collaboration with Frith
- 2007 Attwenger Adventure – on Austrian folk-punk duo Attwenger by Markus Kaiser-Mühlecke, with special appearances by Frith rehearsing and performing live with Attwenger and Wolfgang "I-Wolf" Schlögl at Music Unlimited XX. in Wels, Austria.
- 2009 Act of God – by Jennifer Baichwal about the metaphysical effects of being struck by lightning, with music by Frith and others, and a segment showing Frith conducting an experiment to measure the effect of improvisation on brain waves

== Works cited ==
- Piekut, Benjamin (2019). Henry Cow: The World Is a Problem. Duke University Press. ISBN 978-1-47800-405-9.
