= Iva Bittová =

Czech musician (born 1958)

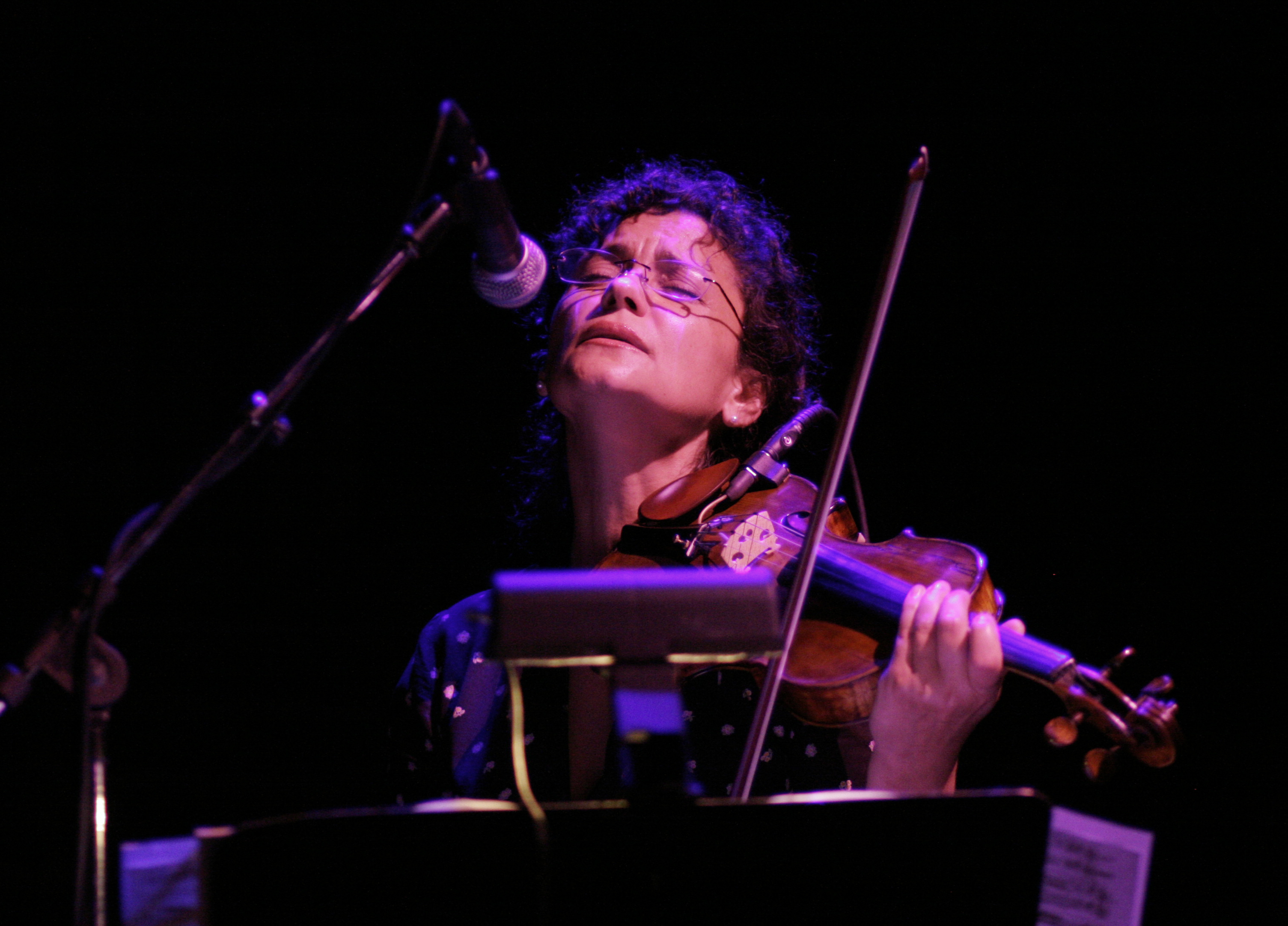
- Iva Bittová in concert 23 September 2007

Background information
- Birth name: Iva Bittová
- Born: 22 July 1958 (age 66); Bruntál, Czechoslovakia
- Genres: Folk, experimental, avant-rock, contemporary classical
- Occupation(s): Musician, composer, actor, teacher
- Instrument(s): Violin, voice
- Years active: 1976–present
- Labels: Supraphon, ECM Records, Indies Records, BMG, Nonesuch/Elektra Records
- Website: www.bittova.com

Iva Bittová (born 22 July 1958) is a Czech avant-garde violinist, singer, and composer. She began her career as an actor in the mid-1970s, appearing in several Czech feature films, but switched to playing violin and singing in the early 1980s. She started recording in 1986 and by 1990 her unique vocal and instrumental technique gained her international recognition. Since then, she has performed regularly throughout Europe, the United States and Japan, and has released over eight solo albums.

In addition to her musical career, Bittová has continued acting and still occasionally appears in feature films. In 2003 she played the part of Zena in Želary, a film nominated for Best Foreign Language Film at the 2004 Academy Awards.

== Biography ==
Iva Bittová was born on 22 July 1958 in the town of Bruntál, Czech Silesia, in what was then Czechoslovakia. The second of three daughters, she grew up in a musical family where her father Koloman Bitto (Hungarian: Bittó Kálmán), a famous musician of Hungarian–Romani origin from southern Slovakia, played guitar, trumpet and double bass in folk and classical ensembles, and her mother Lidmila Bittová (née Masařová) sang in professional vocal groups. As a child, Bittová took ballet and violin lessons in Opava and played child roles in the Silesian Theatre of Zdeněk Nejedlý. When her family moved to Brno in 1971, she dropped music in favour of drama and studied at the Brno Conservatory. For the next ten years, Bittová worked as an actress, appearing in several Czech feature films and Brno television and radio productions.

In the early 1980s, Bittová returned to music and studied violin under Rudolf Šťastný, a teacher at JAMU, the Janáček Academy in Brno. She had received her vocal training while studying drama and soon developed unique vocal and violin styles. In 1985, Bittová collaborated with percussionist Pavel Fajt from the Czech rock group Dunaj and recorded Bittová + Fajt, a fusion of alternative rock music with Slavic and Romani music. She then recorded a few solo EPs in 1986 and sang with Dunaj for the next few years. Her breakthrough came in 1987 when she and Fajt recorded their second album Svatba (The Wedding), which was released internationally by Review Records. This attracted the attention of English percussionist Chris Cutler of Recommended Records, who re-issued Bittová + Fajt internationally. The duo also attracted the attention of English avant-garde guitarist Fred Frith, who featured them in a documentary film on him, Step Across the Border (1990), which gave them their first broad international exposure and a tour outside of Eastern Europe.

In 2015, she graduated from Masaryk University in Brno having undertaken a bachelor program in early music. In 2018, she was awarded a master's degree in musicology by the same university. She received a Peter S. Reed Foundation grant in 2018.

Bittová recorded her first full-length solo album Iva Bittová in 1991, followed by River of Milk, her first United States release. In 1997, she began exploring classical music with a series of concerts and recording an album of Béla Bartók's violin duets. Leoš Janáček Moravian folk poetry in songs, Slovak Songs by Béla Bartók, Alfred Schnittke's Faustus Cantata. She collaborated with Vladimír Václavek to record a double album Bílé Inferno (White Inferno) in 1997. The success of this release led to Bittová and Václavek establishing Čikori, an association of musicians involved in improvisational music.

== Bittová's music ==
Bittová's music is a blend of rock and East European music which she describes as "my own personal folk music". Her violin playing mixes different techniques, including playing the strings with various objects and plucking them like a banjo. Her vocal utterances range from traditional singing to chirping, cackling and deep throat noises. She puts her whole body into her performances, drawing on her theatrical skills. AllMusic.com writes: "Her irresistible charm, original use of voice, and fondness of melodies that sit on the border of avant-garde and playground nursery rhymes won her devoted fans around the world." The music journalist Ken Hunt wrote about her: "Iva Bittová's countryman Milan Kundera from Brno, wrote how Europe's 'small nations' form another Europe. The violinist-vocalist may be a 'small nation' Czech but her musical worldview and visionary creativity acknowledge no borders. Her powers of spontaneous creativity are more bountiful than it is fair to confer on one person. Witness and marvel."

== Repertoire with different composers ==
Sprechstimme in Pierrot Lunaire Arnold Schönberg

Kontraalt in "Seid nüchtern und wachet..." Alfred Schnittke

Mezzo-soprano in Folk songs Luciano Berio

Canto in Kafka-Fragmente Georgy Kurtág

Canto in Frankenstein!! HK Gruber

Arabic voice in Stabat Mater Karl Jenkins

== Discography ==
=== Collaborations ===
With Pavel Fajt

- Bittová + Fajt (1987, LP, Panton)
- Svatba (The Wedding) (1987, LP, Review)

With Dunaj

- Dunaj a Iva Bittová (1989, LP, Panton)
- Pustit Musíš (You Must Let Go) (1996, CD, Rachot Behemot)

With Dorothea Kellerová

- Béla Bartók: 44 dueta pro dvoje housle (44 Duets for Two Violins) (1997, CD, Rachot Behemot)

With Vladimír Václavek

- Bílé inferno (White Inferno) (1997, 2xCD, Indies)

With Škampa Quartet

- Classic (1998, CD, Supraphon)
- Janáček: Moravian Folk Poetry in Songs (2004, CD, Supraphon)

With the Netherlands Wind Ensemble

- Dance of the Vampires (2000, CD, N.W.E.)

With Andreas Kröper

- Echoes (2001, CD, Supraphon)

With Čikori

- Čikori (2001, CD, Indies)

With DJ Javas

- The Party (2004, CD, Indies)

With Miloš Valent, Marek Štryncl, Solamente Naturali, Bratislava Conservatory Choir

- Vladimír Godár: Mater (2006, CD, ECM)

With Bang on a Can

- Elida (2006, CD, Indies)

With Susumu Yokota

- Wonder Waltz (2006, CD, Skintone (J), Lo (UK))

With George Mraz, Emil Viklický and Lolo Tropp

- Moravian Gems (2007, CD, Cube Metier)

With Prague Philharmonia

- Zvon (2012, CD, Supraphon)

With Timothy Hill, David Rothenberg "New Cicada Trio: Live in Beacon (2017, CD, Terra Nova Music)

=== Solo ===
- Iva Bittová (1986, EP, Panton)
- Balada pro banditu (A Ballad for a Bandit) (1986, EP, Panton)
- Iva Bittová (1991, LP, Pavian)
- River of Milk (1991, CD, EVA)
- Ne, nehledej (No, Do Not Seek) (1994, CD, BMG)
- Kolednice (Carol singer) (1995, CD, BMG)
- Divná slečinka (A Strange Young Lady) (1996, CD, BMG)
- Solo (1997, CD, Nonesuch)
- Iva Bittová (2013, CD, ECM)
- Entwine / Proplétám (2014, CD, Pavian Records)

== Filmography ==
- Ružové sny (Rosy Dreams) (1976)
- Die Insel der Silberreiher (Island of the Silver Herons) (1976)
- Jak se budí princezny (1977)
- Balada pro Banditu (Ballad for a Bandit) (1978)
- L. Janáček: Zápisník zmizelého (1980)
- Únos Moravanky (1983)
- Mikola a Mikolko (1988)
- Něha (Tenderness) (1991)
- The Man Who Cried (as the voice for Christina Ricci) (2000)
- Želary (2003)
- Tajnosti (Little Girl Blue) (2007)
