= Nick Didkovsky =

American musician

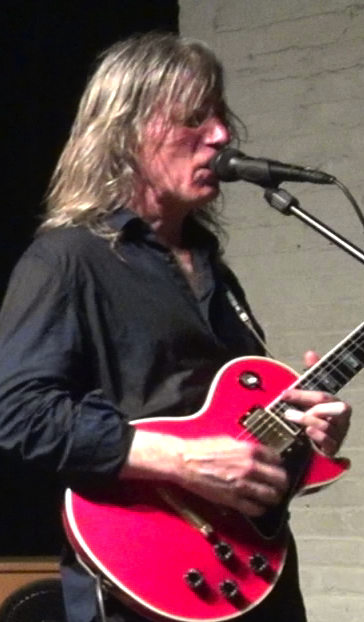
- Nick Didkovsky at The Stone

Background information
- Born: 22 November 1958 (age 67)
- Genres: Progressive rock
- Years active: 1984–present
- Website: www.didkovsky.com

Nick Didkovsky (born 22 November 1958) is a composer, guitarist, computer music programmer, and leader of the band Doctor Nerve. He is a former student of Christian Wolff, Pauline Oliveros and Gerald Shapiro.

== Career ==
Didkovsky formed Doctor Nerve in 1984. He received a master's degree in Computer Music from New York University in 1987 and went on to develop a Java music API called JMSL (Java Music Specification Language). JMSL is a toolbox for algorithmic composition and performance. JMSL includes JScore, an extensible staff notation editor. JMSL can output music using either JavaSound or JSyn. He has presented papers on his work at several conferences.

Ensemble activities include founding the blackened grindcore band Vomit Fist in 2013. He was a composing member of the Fred Frith Guitar Quartet for the ten years of the band's tenure, and has also played in John Zorn's band. His Punos Music record label is a harbor for his more extreme musical projects such as "split", a guitar collaboration with Dylan DiLella of the technical death metal band Pyrrhon.

His debut solo album was released in 1997 and featured contributions from Frith. His second album, Body Parts, came out of a collaboration with Guigou Chenevier.

Didkovsky has composed for or performed on a number of CDs including:

- 1987, Doctor Nerve Armed Observation, Label: Cuneiform, produced by Fred Frith
- 1988, Rascal Reporters Happy Accidents
- 1995, Doctor Nerve SKIN, Label: Cuneiform
- 1997
  - Every Screaming Ear, Label: Cuneiform (January 21, 1997)
  - Ayaya Moses, with the Fred Frith Guitar Quartet
  - Binky Boy
- 1999, Upbeat, with the Fred Frith Guitar Quartet
- 2000, Ereia, with Doctor Nerve and the Sirius String Quartet
- 2003, Bone - uses wrist grab, with Hugh Hopper and John Roulat
- 2015, Vomit Fist Forgive but Avenge
- 2017 Alice Cooper Paranormal
- 2019, Vomit Fist Omnicide

Didkovsky's music has also been arranged by the experimental music group Electric Kompany. He is a co-owner of the "$100 Guitar", a guitar which was circulated amongst many musicians (including Alex Skolnick, Fred Frith, and Nels Cline) for the recording of a concept album about the guitar.

== Solo discography ==
- Now I Do This (1982), Punos Music
- Binky Boy (1997), Punos
- Body Parts (2000), Vand'Oeuvre
- The Bright Lights The Big Time (2005), FMR
- Tube Mouth Bow String (2006), Pogus
- The $100 Guitar Project (2013), Bridge
- Phantom Words (2017), Punos

== Sources ==
- Couture, François "Body Parts Review", Allmusic. Retrieved August 16, 2014
- Dickenson, J. Andrew: "Electric Counterpoint", Urban Guitar, July 2006
- Dorsch, Jim "Nick Didkovsky Biography", Allmusic. Retrieved August 16, 2014
- Jurek, Thom "Binky Boy Review", Allmusic. Retrieved August 16, 2014
- Ross Feller, Ice Cream Time: The Raunchy and the Rigorous
- Rose, Joe, A $100 Guitar Makes A 30,000-Mile Odyssey, , National Public Radio, 4 December 2012
