= René Lussier =

Canadian jazz musician (born 1957)

- Born: April 15, 1957 (age 69); Montreal, Quebec, Canada
- Genres: Avant-garde jazz
- Occupation: Musician
- Instrument: Guitar
- Years active: 1980s–present
- Label: Ambiances Magnétiques
- Website: renelussier.ca

René Lussier (born April 15, 1957) is a jazz guitarist based in Montreal, Quebec, Canada. He is a composer, guitarist, bass guitarist, percussionist, bass clarinetist, and singer. Lussier has collaborated with Fred Frith, Chris Cutler, Jean Derome, and Robert M. Lepage. He combines elements from several genres and is often referred to within the discourse of contemporary classical music or Musiques Actuelles in French.

== Biography ==
Born in Montreal, Quebec, Lussier began his musical career in 1973 in Chambly, Quebec as part of the progressive rock band Arpège. From 1976 to 1980, he was a member of the Montreal folk-progressive group Conventum led by André Duchesne. Lussier was also a member of the groups Quatour de l'Emmieux and les Reins, Nébu and La G.U.M in the late 1970s and early 1980s. In 1986 he joined Duchesne's Les 4 Guitaristes de l'Apocalypso-Bar.

In 1979 he worked with Duchesne on the music for a short film called Tanobe. He has written or co-written the scores to more than 35 films, including Chronique d'un génocide annoncé, a documentary by Danièle Lacourse and Yvan Patry about the Rwandan genocide.

Lussier played guitar for singer Pauline Julien between 1982 and 1984, though he also worked on esoteric music that blurred distinctions between progressive rock, jazz, improvisation, modern composition, and circus music. His first solo album, Fin du travail (version I), was released in 1983. He has collaborated with Derome and Lepage, and has recorded three albums with the Fred Frith Guitar Quartet, Ayaya Moses (1997) and Upbeat (1999) as well as the second side of Quartets (1994). Lussier is featured prominently in Step Across the Border (1990), a documentary by Nicolas Humbert and Werner Penzel about the work and travels of Frith. Lussier was also a member of Frith's band Keep the Dog (1989–1991).

In 1983, Lussier co-founded the Ambiances Magnétiques record label and recording with Derome, Lepage and Duchesne. Le trésor de la langue (1989), was created during this period. The album interspersed music with taped recordings of Quebec residents discussing the importance of the French language. It won the Grand Prix Paul-Gilson award in 1989.

In the late 1990s, Lussier recorded two albums for solo guitar and a pair of collaborations with Martin Tétreault which reflected an interest in the history of musique concrète and electroacoustic music composition and theory.

== Discography ==
- Fin du travail (version 1) (1983)
- Chants et danses du monde inanimée (with Robert Lepage) (1984)
- Soyez vigilants... restez vivants! (with Jean Derome) (1986)
- Nous autres (with Fred Frith) (1986)
- Le retour des granules (1987)
- Le trésor de la langue (1989)
- Des pas et des mois (with Martin Tétreault and Michel F. Coté) (1990)
- Au royaume du silencieux (1992)
- Le corps de l'ouvrage (1994)
- Three Suite Piece (with Jean Derome and Chris Cutler) (1996)
- Le tour du bloc (1996)
- Trois histoires (1996)
- La vie qui bat chèvre (with Pierre Tanguay) (1997)
- La vie qui bat chevreuil (with Pierre Tanguay) (1998)
- Chronique d'un génocide annoncé (1998)
- Dur noyau dur (with Martin Tétreault) (1998)
- Qu'ouis-je (with Martin Tétreault) (2000)
- Solos de guitar électrique (2000)
- Deboutonné (2000)
- Tombola rasa (2001)
- Le contrat with Gilles Gobeil (empreintes DIGITALes, IMED 0372, 2003)
- Grand vent (2005)
- Le prix du bonheur (2005)
