= Festival International de Musique Actuelle de Victoriaville =

- Genre: Experimental music, contemporary classical music, free jazz, electronic music, improv
- Locations: Victoriaville, Quebec
- Years active: 1984-present
- Website: Festival International de Musique Actuelle de Victoriaville (FIMAV)

The Festival International de Musique Actuelle de Victoriaville (French pronunciation: [fɛstival ɛ̃tɛʁnɑsjɔnal də myzik aktɥɛl də viktɔʁjavil]) is an annual international music festival held in Victoriaville, Quebec that showcases contemporary music.

The festival is known for its small scale (usually no more than 20 performances per year), as well as its emphasis on unique collaborations between musicians. Several of these collaborations have been issued on records, on the Victo record label.

Despite its location in rural Quebec, the festival has attracted several international artists every year, many of them coming back several times to play at the festival. This list includes John Zorn, Thurston Moore and Lee Ranaldo of Sonic Youth, Jim O'Rourke, Godspeed You! Black Emperor and The Ex. Frequent collaborators also includes René Lussier, Fred Frith and Chris Cutler of Art Bears, Jean Derome, Cecil Taylor and Peter Brötzmann.

== See also ==
- List of experimental music festivals
- List of contemporary classical music festivals
- List of Quebec festivals
