= Ambiances Magnétiques =

Canadian record company and label

- Founded: 1983
- Founder: Jean Derome; René Lussier
- Distributor: Distributions Ambiances Magnétiques Etc.
- Genre: Avant-garde jazz, free improvisation
- Country of origin: Canada
- Location: Montreal, Quebec
- Official website: ambiancesmagnetiques.com

Ambiances Magnétiques is a Canadian record company and label started by Jean Derome, René Lussier, and others, and the artists' collective that preceded it.

== History ==
In 1982, "guitarist René Lussier and saxophonist/flutist Jean Derome presented a few duo concerts in Montreal under the name Ambiances Magnétiques [...] They teamed up with guitarist André Duchesne and clarinetist Robert Marcel Lepage and launched the label Ambiances Magnétiques in 1983". The label was managed by a collective, and its releases were of performances by its members and close associates until the late 1990s. In this initial period, several others were added to the core group: Joane Hétu, Diane Labrosse, Danielle P. Roger, Michel F. Côté and Martin Tétreault.

As a group, they performed together only twice, including for the album Une Théorie des Ensembles. The collective also formed a distribution outlet and production companies that organise events. The label had released 90 albums by the end of the year 2000.

== See also ==
- List of record labels
