= Guitar Solos / Fifty =

- Cover for disc 1 (Guitar Solos)

Studio album by Fred Frith
- Released: 16 February 2024
- Recorded: 1974 (Guitar Solos); 2023 (Fifty)
- Studio: Kaleidophon, London (Guitar Solos); Guerrilla Sound, Oakland (Fifty)
- Genre: Free improvisation avant-garde
- Length: 75:31
- Label: Week-End Records
- Producer: Fred Frith

Fred Frith chronology
Laying Demons to Rest (2023)	Guitar Solos / Fifty (2024)

Guitar Solos series chronology
Guitar Solos 3 (1979)	Guitar Solos / Fifty (2024)

Additional cover
- Cover for disc 2 (Fifty)

Guitar Solos / Fifty is a 2024 solo double LP by English guitarist, composer and improviser Fred Frith. It was released on vinyl in Germany by Week-End Records to mark the fiftieth anniversary of the release of Frith's 1974 debut solo album, Guitar Solos. The first disc of the double album is a reissue of his original 1974 solo album remastered, and the second disc is a new solo album of 13 guitar tracks Frith recorded in 2023. Just as the original Guitar Solos was recorded without any overdubbing, Fifty also had no overdubs.

== Background ==
Frith recorded the original Guitar Solos in July 1974 while he was a member of English experimental rock group Henry Cow. The album has eight tracks of unaccompanied and improvised music played by Frith on prepared guitars without any overdubbing. Guitar Solos was well received by critics at the time, and resulted in two follow-up albums, Guitar Solos 2 (1976) and Guitar Solos 3 (1979), featuring additional tracks by Frith, plus several other improvising guitarists, including Derek Bailey and Hans Reichel.

To mark the upcoming fiftieth anniversary of Guitar Solos in 2024, Jan Lankisch of Week-End Records in Cologne, Germany suggested to Frith in 2023 that they reissue Guitar Solos as a double-LP with a second disc of new material. Frith began selecting unreleased recordings he had made over the previous fifty years, but Lankisch proposed that Frith record the new material. Frith liked the idea and decided to reproduce the same recording environment that was used in 1974 as much as possible. He used the same guitar he had used on the original album, the 1936 Gibson K-11, and created multiple sound sources from pickups on the guitar, and microphones positioned on his seat and around the room. Frith said they managed to reproduce the original studio environment quite closely, but noted that "it became apparent that a lot of it was not really relevant anymore." Reflecting on the recording of Guitar Solos fifty years ago, Frith noted how "naïve" he was at the time. He said he knew very little of the London improvisation scene, and had he known what other musicians were doing, "I probably wouldn't have made the record!"

Just as no overdubbing was used on the original Guitar Solos, the new recordings for Fifty had no overdubs. Frith played his guitar held in the "conventional position" on all of Fifty's tracks, as was the case on all but one of the tracks on Guitar Solos – on "No Birds" he played two guitars flat on a table. Week-End Records released Guitar Solos / Fifty on vinyl in February 2024 in a limited edition of 1,000 copies. The double-LP's sleeves are illustrated with the photograph from the original 1974 album showing Frith playing a guitar on a cricket field in front of a sight screen, and a similarly posed photograph of Frith taken in 2023.

== Reception ==
In a review of Guitar Solos / Fifty in The Wire, Clive Bell called the album "a clever, confident record by an old master". He described the newly recorded tracks on the second disc as varying between "pretty and melodic" and "gritty or microtonal". In contrast to Frith's loud "rocky" Fred Frith Trio, Bell said "Fifty is surprisingly delicate and understated." Throughout the album, Bell wondered whether the multilayered sound was created with overdubbing, "but of course there is none". He stated that Frith "foregrounds the physically of playing a guitar", which "is to be treasured" in an era of effects pedals and synthesisers. Bell said Frith "confronts his younger self and the sheer nerve of what he was attempting back then."

Jennifer Lucy Allan wrote in The Quietus that the music on Guitar Solos "embraces texture and resonance", and the repetitions, sounds and noise "make me go fizzy". She said that the way "No Birds" opens and closes "is burned into my synapses". Allan was pleased that on Fifty, "Frith has ... not softened, nor suffered calcification, and the playing is as energetically nimble as ever." She added, "The palette remains fresh; the creative insistence in the playing remains. Sonic ideas that might otherwise seep into the earth are caught and excavated".

Reviewing the album in the Spanish music magazine, Rockdelux Jesús Rodríguez Lenin wrote that while Fifty was recorded using similar techniques and in a similar environment that was used for Guitar Solos, the new recordings do not have the same impact that the original album had. In the 1970s, listeners must have been "astonished" (atónito) by what Frith had done, but today, free improvisation and "radical avant-garde" (vanguardias radicales) is quite common. Nevertheless, Lenin stated that there is still much to appreciate on Fifty – the music is more "delicate" (delicado), "even beautiful" (incluso bonito) and "almost melodic" (casi melódico). As with Guitar Solos, Lenin said Fifty has noise, but because there are no overdubs, it makes the listener more appreciative of what Frith is doing with his guitar.

== Track listings ==
All tracks are written by Fred Frith

=== Guitar Solos (1974) ===
Side one
No.	Title	Length
1.	"Hello Music"	1:31
2.	"Glass c/w Steel"	5:36
3.	"Ghosts"	3:11
4.	"Out of Their Heads (On Locoweed)"	8:31
Total length:		18:49

Side two
No.	Title	Length
5.	"Not Forgotten"	1:55
6.	"Hollow Music"	2:44
7.	"Heat c/w Moment"	1:42
8.	"No Birds"	12:42
Total length:		19:03

=== Fifty (2024) ===
Side one
No.	Title	Length
1.	"Dawns"	3:30
2.	"Outer Order"	4:28
3.	"Tempus Fugit"	2:41
4.	"Quicksilver (for Simone)"	2:04
5.	"Unterwegs (for Roman)"	3:52
6.	"Phalaropes"	1:33
Total length:		18:08

Side two
No.	Title	Length
7.	"Jack's Neap Tide"	2:08
8.	"Schlechte Gewissen"	2:24
9.	"Move Indigo"	3:54
10.	"To Do"	1:39
11.	"The Map of Dreams"	3:28
12.	"Locomoting"	4:07
13.	"Dusks"	1:51
Total length:		19:31

Source: Liner notes

== Personnel ==
- Fred Frith – guitars, prepared guitars

=== Production and artwork ===
- Recording engineers – David Vorhaus (Guitar Solos), Myles Boisen (Fifty)
- Remastering – Myles Boisen (Guitar Solos tracks)
- Editor – Aaron M Olson
- Tape recovery – Maggi Payne (Guitar Solos tracks)
- Design concept and layout – Jan Lankisch
- Photography – Ray Smith (Guitar Solos), Myles Boisen (Fifty), Roberto Masotti (Fifty)

Source: Liner notes

== Works cited ==
- Bell, Clive (January–February 2024a). "Fred Frith: Take It to the Bridge". The Wire (479+480). London: 38–44. ISSN 0952-0686.
- Milkowski, Bill (1983). "The Frith Factor: Exploration in Sound". DownBeat. Vol. 50, no. 1. Chicago: Maher Publications. pp. 22–25, 61. ISSN 0012-5768.
