= Laying Demons to Rest =

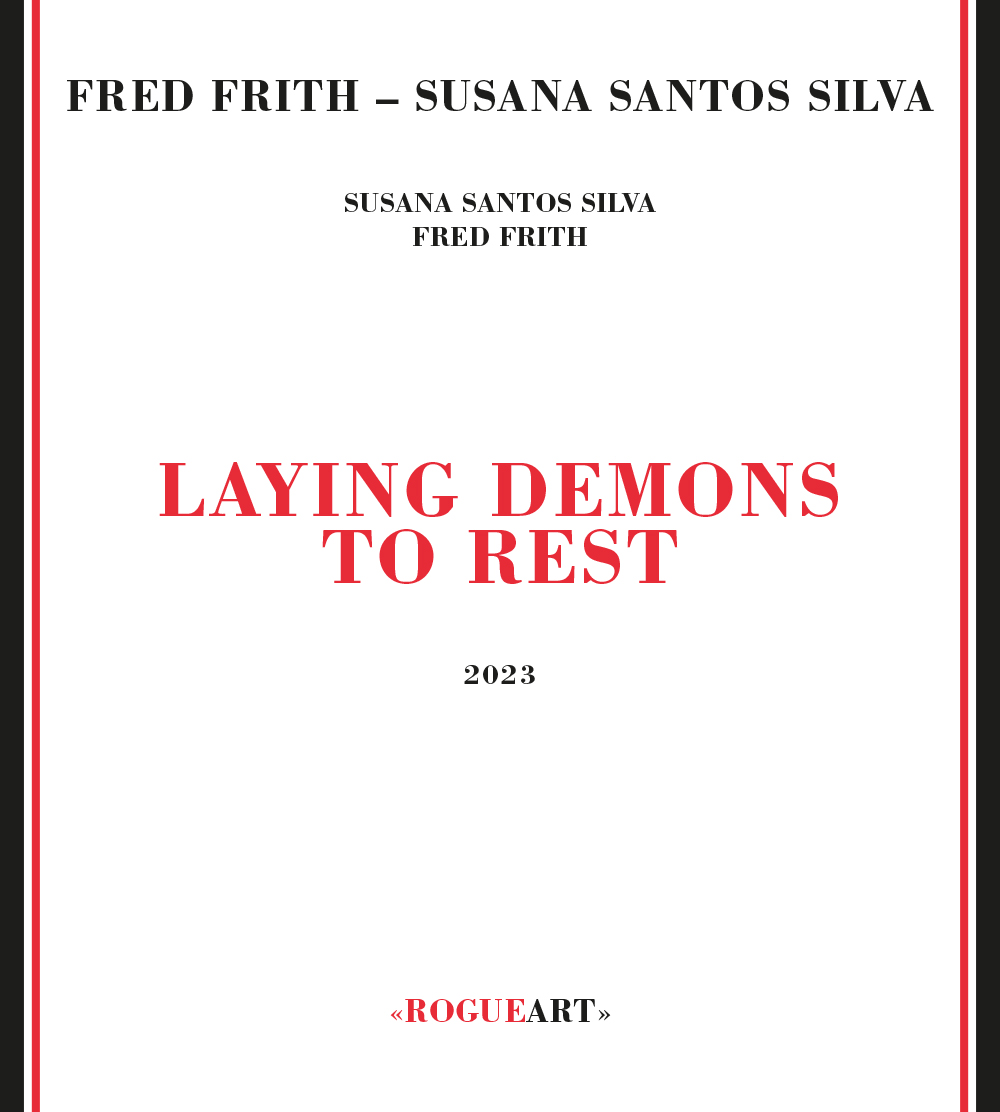

Live album by Fred Frith and Susana Santos Silva
- Released: January 2023
- Recorded: 27 August 2021
- Venue: Motoco, Mulhouse, France
- Genre: Avant-garde jazz; free improvisation
- Length: 41:57
- Label: RogueArt
- Producer: Anne Montaron / Radio France

Fred Frith chronology
| Cut Up the Border (2020) | Laying Demons to Rest (2023) | Guitar Solos / Fifty (2024) |

Laying Demons to Rest is a 2023 live album by English guitarist Fred Frith and Portuguese trumpeter Susana Santos Silva. It consists of a single continuous track of improvised music, and was recorded live in August 2021 for Radio France as part of Festival Météo at Motoco, Mulhouse, France. The album was released by French record label RogueArt in January 2023.

Santos Silva had previously performed with Frith on Road, a live album recorded while on tour with the Fred Frith Trio in 2019.

== Reception ==
In a review of Laying Demons to Rest in The Big Takeover, Michael Toland called the album "quite an accomplishment, one that holds attention without ever demanding it." He said that while Frith and Santos Silva make the noises generally associated with free improvisation, they "rarely ... descend into straightahead noisemaking." Instead, the duo restrain themselves and focus on "creating and sustaining a mood, keeping the atmosphere low key but urgent".

Jan Granlie wrote in a review of the album at the Norwegian website salt peanuts* that Laying Demons to Rest is an "extremely exciting, creative and beautiful record" (ytterst spennende, kreativt og fin plate). He praised the way the duo spontaneously builds on each other's ideas and develops music that is "outstanding" and "exquisite".

A review of Laying Demons to Rest in Avant Music News stated that "despite generational, cultural, and geographic divides" between Frith and Santos Silva, they have produced an unexpected and "strangely cohesive yet aleatoric [album], one that easily stands up to multiple listens." The review said where the pair excels is when they "abandon all conventional notions of music and ... generate sounds", adding that "[t]heir dialogs gently push one another not to do more or less, but to create."

A review at Best of Jazz said that on Laying Demons to Rest, Frith and Santos Silva "connects beyond expectations." It described the album as more than just guitar-trumpet music: "The scope of textures, expressions, and impressions gathered here is just phenomenal; the dance between solo and accompaniment is so blurred and so delectable". The review stated that the album's title "really captures the atmosphere", adding that Tim Hodgkinson's "very evocative" liner notes called it "A laying to rest, an exorcism, a healing".

== Track listing ==
| No. | Title | Writer(s) | Length |
|---|---|---|---|
| 1. | "Laying Demons to Rest" | Fred Frith, Susana Santos Silva | 41:57 |

Source: CD liner notes, Discogs.

== Personnel ==
- Fred Frith – electric guitar
- Susana Santos Silva – trumpet

=== Production and artwork ===
- Patrick Muller – recording engineer
- Myles Boisen – mastering (Headless Buddha, Oakland, California)
- Anne Montaron – producer
- Radio France – producer
- Tim Hodgkinson – liner notes
- Patric Lambin – photography
- Max Schoendorff – cover design
- David Bourguignon – cover realization

Source: CD liner notes, Discogs.
