= Stadthalle =

Stadthalle may refer to:

- Stadthalle (Nuremberg U-Bahn), a Nuremberg U-Bahn metro station in Fürth, Germany

== Buildings ==
=== Germany ===
- Bremerhaven Stadthalle, an arena in Bremerhaven
- Stadthalle (Königsberg), a concert hall in former Königsberg
- Stadthalle Bremen, an indoor arena in Bremen
- Stadthalle Freiburg, a former concert hall in Freiburg im Breisgau
- Stadthalle Fürth, a concert hall in Fürth
- Stadthalle Köln, a conference centre in Cologne
- Stadthalle Offenbach, a convention center in Offenbach am Main
- Kongresszentrum Karlsruhe § Stadthalle

=== Austria ===
- Stadthalle (Klagenfurt), an indoor sporting arena in Klagenfurt
- Stadthalle (Villach), an indoor sporting arena in Villach
- Stadthalle Graz, an arrangement hall in Graz
- Wiener Stadthalle, an indoor arena in Vienna

=== Switzerland ===
- Sursee Stadthalle, an indoor sporting arena in Sursee
