= Fishkin =

Fishkin is a surname. Notable people with the surname include:

- Arnold Fishkind (1919–1999), American jazz bassist, sometimes credited as Arnold Fishkin
- Daniel Fishkin, American musician
- James S. Fishkin (born 1948), American academic
- Shelley Fisher Fishkin (born 1950), American academic

== See also ==
- Judy Fiskin (born 1945), American artist
