= Closer to the Ground =

Studio album by Fred Frith Trio
- Released: September 15, 2018
- Recorded: January 13–15, 2018
- Studio: Sharkbite Studios, Oakland, California
- Genre: Experimental music; free improvisation
- Length: 50:56
- Label: Intakt (Switzerland)
- Producer: Fred Frith, Intakt Records

Fred Frith Trio chronology
Another Day in Fucking Paradise (2016)	Closer to the Ground (2018)	Road (2021)

Closer to the Ground is a 2018 studio album by the Fred Frith Trio, a San Francisco Bay Area based experimental music and free improvising group featuring Fred Frith, Jason Hoopes and Jordan Glenn. It is their second album and was recorded in Oakland, California in January 2018, and released in September 2018 by Intakt Records in Switzerland. It follows on from their first album, Another Day in Fucking Paradise that was released in June 2016.

== Reception ==
Professional ratings
Review scores
Source	Rating
DownBeat	3/5 stars
Jazzwise	4/5 stars

In a review in DownBeat magazine, music critic Peter Margasak described Frith's ensemble as "a scrappy improvising trio" who "deftly" revisit many of Frith's musical endeavors in "a gritty, unified attack". He wrote that on Closer to the Ground the improvisations are "groove-oriented" and have their roots in rock music. Melodies surface occasionally, but the trio focuses on "exploring the nexus of groove and mood" without remaining in one place for too long.

Andy Robson wrote in the British monthly, Jazzwise that Closer to the Ground is "nearer to jazz heaven". He complimented Frith's "discipline and control", saying that there are no fillers, licks are not repeated. Robson also praised Hoopes' "fascinating foil" to Frith's guitar, and in particular Glenn's "colours, accents and pared-down patterns ... that underwrite this odyssey".

Reviewing the album for the German radio station WDR 3, Karl Lippegaus said it picks up from where their first album left off. The trio's spontaneous arrangements lead to "chain reactions" (Kettenreaktionen), and while on the surface Closer to the Ground appears to be similar to their debut album, it turns out to be quite different with its tangle of "complex soundscapes" (komplexen Soundscapes).

Writing on the website In On The Corner, Kevin Coultas described the Fred Frith Trio as one of Frith's "most superlative" bands since Henry Cow. He complimented the rhythm section of Hoopes and Glenn, saying that they "lay down metronomic and/or shifting grooves" that produce "sunset-like colors on which Frith eviscerates and/or gently highlights with an array of engaging tremolo and reverberant effects". Coultas praised Intakt Records for producing "such a vital statement from a singular artist and his inventive crew".

== Track listing ==
All tracks composed by the Fred Frith Trio.

No.	Title	Length
1.	"Bones to Pick With Graveyards"	5:16
2.	"Alle Planmässigen Ziele Werden Erreicht"	5:06
3.	"In the Grip of It"	4:56
4.	"Ruhebereich"	6:23
5.	"Stars Like Trees"	5:55
6.	"A Path Made By Walking"	6:49
7.	"Betting on the World"	2:39
8.	"Love and Other Embers"	7:34
9.	"Up in Smoke"	6:18

Sources: Intakt Records, Discogs.

== Personnel ==
- Fred Frith – electric guitar, organ
- Jason Hoopes – electric bass, double bass
- Jordan Glenn – drums, percussion

Sources: Intakt Records, Discogs.

=== Sound and artwork ===
Recorded at Sharkbite Studios, Oakland, California, January 13–15, 2018; mixed at Guerrilla Recording, Oakland, February 2018; mastered at Headless Buddha, Oakland, March 8, 2018.

- Scott Evans – recording engineer (Sharkbite Studios)
- Myles Boisen – remastering (Guerrilla Recording, Headless Buddha)
- Fred Frith – producer
- Intakt Records – producer
- Heike Liss – photography, cover art
- Jonas Schoder – graphic design

Sources: Intakt Records, Discogs.
