= Woodwork (album) =

Live album by Fred Frith
- Released: 23 August 2019
- Recorded: 20 November 2018
- Venue: Ateliers Claus, Brussels, Belgium
- Genre: Experimental music; free improvisation
- Length: 46:04
- Label: Klanggalerie (Austria)

Fred Frith chronology
All Is Always Now – Live at The Stone (2019)	Woodwork (2019)	Cut Up the Border (2020)

Woodwork: Live at Ateliers Claus is a 2019 live album by English guitarist Fred Frith. It features a live solo guitar performance by Frith on 20 November 2018 at the Ateliers Claus in Brussels, Belgium, (Note: The concert on 20 November 2018 at the Ateliers Claus was a double bill, featuring French artist and musician Stephane Clor, followed by Frith.) during his November 2018 European tour. The album was released by Klanggalerie in Austria on 23 August 2019. Woodwork is an "[u]naccompanied single-take album", and is Frith's first live solo guitar album since his 1982 album, Live in Japan.

== Background ==
In an interview with Kurt Gottschalk in The New York City Jazz Record, Frith said that he had been receiving requests from Walter Robotka at Klanggalerie to release a solo guitar album. While trying to decide what material he could use from his recording archive, Frith realized he could use his solo guitar performance at the Ateliers Claus in November 2018. He added, "[It] felt great and they'd made a really good recording of it, so I thought, perfect!"

== Reception ==
Professional ratings
Review scores
Source	Rating
Musikreviews.de	10/15 stars
Musique Machine	4/5 stars

In a review of Woodwork at Musikreviews.de, Andreas Schiffmann said Frith augments his guitar on the album with a variety of effects, including live looping, percussive tapping and his voice. "Stillness the Dancing" appears to comprise several milestones around which Frith improvises, giving the piece a suggestion of a structure with sporadic melody fragments surfacing from time to time. "Falls the Shadow" is quieter, which Schiffmann said requires careful listening to appreciate its nuances. He felt, however, that Frith does occasionally get a little "carried away" with his voice. Schiffmann concluded that just as Frith demonstrated how far he can push a guitar on his 1974 album Guitar Solos, over four decades later on Woodwork he shows that he is still at the forefront of guitar innovation and experimentation.

Writing at Musique Machine, Roger Batty described Woodwork as "a wonderfully eventful, daring and rewarding release", and called Frith a "highly respected, versatile, and devilishly creative guitarist". Batty said his performance on the album varies from "darting [and] jagged improv", to "chugging and dense heaviness", to "unearthly ambience", to "all out noise". But he "never becomes showy or egontric [sic]", and underneath all the apparent random sounds, there is a definite composition around which he improvises. Batty commended Frith for his "invention, control, and variation" and said Woodwork is worth investigating, "either if you enjoy darting [and] creative modern composition, or if you hearing what a true master of the guitar can do with his instrument."

== Track listing ==
All tracks are written by Fred Frith.

No.	Title	Length
1.	"Stillness the Dancing"	41:32
2.	"Falls the Shadow"	4:32

Sources: Liner notes, Discogs.

== Personnel ==
- Fred Frith – guitar, voice

Sources: Liner notes, Discogs.

=== Sound and artwork ===
- Recorded by Christophe Albertijn at Ateliers Claus in Brussels, Belgium on 28 November 2018
- Mixed at Guerrilla Recording, Oakland, California on 30 January 2019
- Mastered at Headless Buddha Mastering Lab, Oakland on 6 February 2019
- Myles Boisen – engineer
- Fred Frith – photographs
- Lisa Robotka – CD layout

Sources: Liner notes, Discogs.
