= All Is Always Now – Live at The Stone =

Live album by Fred Frith
- Released: March 2019
- Recorded: 2007–2016
- Venue: The Stone, New York City
- Genre: Experimental music; free improvisation
- Length: 200:42
- Label: Intakt (Switzerland)
- Producer: Fred Frith and Intakt Records

Fred Frith chronology
Storytelling (2017)	All Is Always Now – Live at The Stone (2019)	Woodwork (2019)

All Is Always Now – Live at The Stone is a 2019 three-CD box set of live improvised music performed by English guitarist Fred Frith with other musicians, including Theresa Wong, Ikue Mori, Pauline Oliveros and Laurie Anderson. It was recorded between 2007 and 2016 at The Stone in New York City, and was released in March 2019 by Intakt Records in Switzerland.

Frith performed in 80 concerts at The Stone between 2006 and 2016 and Intakt called this collection "A decade-long adventure in improvisation". The titles of the songs are derived from The New York Times headlines on the day of each performance. (Note: Frith's wife, Heike Liss suggested that he use a headline from The New York Times on the date of each concert as the title for the performance. They used the newspaper's electronic archives to search for headlines they could use as song titles.) The box set's liner notes are a 24-page booklet written by Frith, which includes an interview with Frith conducted by one of the performers, Theresa Wong. Remarking on this collection, Wong said:

I was struck by the musicality. What I mean by that is: there's this presence of songs and song forms – the music can be harmonic and melodic, there's noise, there's rhythm, a joyfulness, an exploration, a sensuality of sounds, but always underlining that is a musicality that feels to me like songs.

== Reception ==
Reviewing All Is Always Now in NZZ am Sonntag, the weekend edition of the Swiss newspaper Neue Zürcher Zeitung, Manfred Papst referred to Frith as a "wild guy" (wilder Kerl) who loves to experiment with noise and sound. He called the selection of concerts from The Stone featured on this triple-CD "a sensation", and was surprised at just how many different styles of music Frith and his collaborators play.

Writing in The New York City Jazz Record, Mark Keresman described the sounds in the box set as an assortment of "jubilant [and] whimsical noise", "droning" and "song-like tapestries". The found and homemade instruments Frith and Tewari use on their tracks produce "a roughhewn, amiably dissonant collage of sonic shards (dis)assembled for the sheer joy of it". Keresman said some of the pieces sound like "the soundtrack to a movie thriller yet to be made". On "Evidence" Frith and Anderson produce notes that "build and release tension" like "an Ennio Morricone film score".

Georges Tonla Briquet remarked on the Belgian jazz website, JazzHalo that the only thread linking the collection's diverse tracks is that the music is completely unrehearsed and improvised. He said while there is plenty of noise and unusual sounds, there are many quiet and delicate sections. He found it "claustrophobic" at times, but also "surprisingly transparent". Briquet added that the album is long and even "seasoned fans" may find it a little excessive.

== Track listing ==
All titles performed at The Stone on the dates indicated; all titles composed by the performers.

CD 1
No.	Title	Performers	Length
1.	"Another Ship Moves In" (August 30, 2013)	Fred Frith, Nava Dunkelman, Amma Ateria	5:16
2.	"Identity Crisis" (December 9, 2014)	Fred Frith Trio: Frith, Jason Hoopes, Jordan Glenn, Jessica Lurie (guest)	11:42
3.	"A Complicated Path" (September 1, 2013)	Frith, Theresa Wong, Annie Lewandowski	7:39
4.	"Strife and Soil" (August 31, 2013)	Frith, Ikue Mori, Nate Wooley	9:30
5.	"Limited Strike" (August 30, 2013)	Normal: Frith, Sudhu Tewari	6:11
6.	"Silver Lining" (September 1, 2013)	Frith, Wong, Lewandowski	3:07
7.	"Slipping" (August 31, 2013)	Frith, Mori, Wooley	5:16
8.	"World of Grief and Doubt" (September 1, 2013)	Frith, Wong, Lewandowski	6:55

CD 2
No.	Title	Performers	Length
1.	"Concussion Suit" (August 30, 2013)	Normal: Frith, Tewari	6:37
2.	"From the Backctretch" (May 13, 2007)	Frith, Pauline Oliveros, Else Olsen Storesund	6:32
3.	"Shrug at Truth" (December 7, 2016)	Frith, Sylvie Courvoisier	15:26
4.	"Reasons to Dream" (December 13, 2014)	Frith, Shelley Hirsch	8:15
5.	"What Gets Left Behind" (May 13, 2007)	Frith, Oliveros, Storesund	8:11
6.	"Like Animals" (December 8, 2016)	Frith, Mori, Clara Weil	10:53
7.	"A Measure of Solace" (October 15, 2009)	Frith, Evan Parker	10:42

CD 3
No.	Title	Performers	Length
1.	"Deter and Degrade" (August 28, 2013)	Fred Frith Trio: Frith, Hoopes, Glenn	8:56
2.	"Of Finest Silver" (August 27, 2013)	Frith, Laurie Anderson	3:29
3.	"Veils" (December 7, 2016)	Frith, Gyan Riley	6:27
4.	"Held Again" (August 27, 2013)	Frith, Anderson	7:04
5.	"Flare" (December 13, 2014)	Frith, Miya Masaoka	19:26
6.	"Hero of the Space Age" (December 9, 2016)	Frith, Anderson	7:35
7.	"Devoted to a Failed Approach" (December 10, 2014)	Normal: Frith, Tewari	6:07
8.	"Evidence" (August 27, 2013)	Frith, Anderson	8:09

Sources: Liner notes, Intakt Records, Discogs.

== Personnel ==
- Fred Frith – piano (track 1.1), home-made instruments (tracks 1.5, 2.1, 2.6, 3.7), acoustic guitar and voice (tracks 2.2, 2.5), electric guitar (all other tracks)
- Nava Dunkelman – percussion
- Amma Ateria – electronics
- Jason Hoopes – electric bass (track 1.2), double bass (track 3.1)
- Jordan Glenn – drums
- Jessica Lurie – alto saxophone
- Theresa Wong – cello, voice, electronics
- Annie Lewandowski – piano
- Ikue Mori – electronics
- Nate Wooley – trumpet
- Sudhu Tewari – recuperated junk
- Pauline Oliveros – re-tuned accordion
- Else Olson Storesund – prepared piano
- Sylvie Courvoisier – piano
- Shelley Hirsch – voice
- Clara Weil – voice
- Evan Parker – saxophone
- Laurie Anderson – violin, keyboards, electronics
- Gyan Riley – electric guitar
- Miya Masaoka – koto, electronics

=== Sound and artwork ===
Recorded at The Stone, New York City between 2007 and 2016. Mixed at Jankowski SoundFabrik, Esslingen, Germany on February 27, 28 and March 1, 2018.

- Ben Young – recording engineer (track 2.7)
- Joe Lizzi – recording engineer (track 2.7)
- Shane Brown – recording engineer (tracks 2.3, 2.6, 3.3, 3.6)
- Else Olsen Storesund – recording engineer using a video camera (tracks 2.2, 2.5)
- Jeremiah Cymerman – recording engineer (all other tracks)
- Peter Hardt – creative engineer (mixing, enhancing)
- Fred Frith – liner notes
- Jonas Schoder – graphic design
- Heike Liss – photography

Sources: Liner notes, Intakt Records, Discogs.
