= Guitar Solos =

Studio album by Fred Frith
- Released: October 1974
- Recorded: 11–13 and 15 July 1974
- Studios: Kaleidophon Studios, London
- Genres: Free improvisation; avant-garde
- Length: 37:17
- Label: Caroline
- Producer: Fred Frith

Fred Frith chronology
Guitar Solos (1974)	With Friends Like These (1979)

Guitar Solos series chronology
Guitar Solos (1974)	Guitar Solos 2 (1976)

Guitar Solos is the debut solo album of English guitarist, composer, and improviser Fred Frith. It was recorded while Frith was still a member of the English experimental rock group Henry Cow and was released in the United Kingdom on LP record by Caroline Records in October 1974. The album comprises eight tracks of unaccompanied and improvised music played on prepared guitars by Frith without any overdubbing.

Guitar Solos was voted one of the best albums of 1974 by NME critics. AllMusic called it a landmark album because of its innovative and experimental approach to guitar playing. It also attracted the attention of Brian Eno, resulting in Frith playing guitar on two of Eno's albums, and spawned two follow-up albums, Guitar Solos 2 (1976) and Guitar Solos 3 (1979).

Guitar Solos was remastered and released on CD on Frith's own record label, Fred Records, in 2002. In February 2024, a fiftieth anniversary edition of the album was released on double-LP by Week-End Records entitled Guitar Solos / Fifty, comprising the original 1974 album, plus a new solo album of 13 previously unreleased tracks.

== Background ==
Fred Frith was a classically-trained violinist who turned to playing blues guitar while still at school. In 1967 he went to Cambridge University where he and fellow student, Tim Hodgkinson formed Henry Cow. While at University, Frith read John Cage's Silence: Lectures and Writings, which changed his attitude to music completely. He realised that "sound, in and of itself, can be as important as ... melody and harmony and rhythm." This changed his approach to the guitar, "just to see what I could get out of it", and initiated a long period of experimentation that continued throughout Frith's musical career.

While the music of Henry Cow was highly orchestrated and structured, Frith also began to experiment with unstructured music, using prepared instruments and chance composition. In June 1974, after the release of Henry Cow's second album Unrest, Virgin Records (Henry Cow's record label) commissioned a solo record from Frith. They were impressed with his musical ability and gave him free rein to record whatever he wanted. Frith accepted Virgin's challenge, realising that he had "an interesting opportunity to see if I could actually redefine what the instrument was." He decided that the album would consist of a number of "minimally planned improvisation[s]", "a set of études". Frith spent four days in July 1974 recording at the Kaleidophon Studios in London, and in October that year, Virgin released the album as Guitar Solos on their budget label, Caroline Records.

Frith believes that Virgin wanted to transform him into a guitar hero. "[They] were trying to turn me into a star, which is what record companies try to do." Frith had no interest in becoming a "guitar hero", and said "I couldn't do those things, it's not my vocabulary ... I wasn't going to be the next Jeff Beck. So, rather than produce a "guitar hero record", what Frith made "was almost the antithesis" of what Virgin were expecting. American music academic Benjamin Piekut noted the similarity between Guitar Solos and Derek Bailey's 1971 album, Solo Guitar, but added that while Frith knew Bailey at the time, he had not heard Bailey's solo album.

== Recording ==
Frith recorded the album at David Vorhaus's Kaleidophon Studios in London on 11–13 and 15 July 1974, where he played a modified 1936 Gibson K-11. He added an extra pickup over the strings at the nut, enabling him to amplify sound from both sides of the fretted note. He then split the fretboard in two with a capo, effectively giving him two guitars, each amplified separately that he could play independently with each hand. To split the sounds further he attached alligator clips at various positions on the strings. The net result was a guitar with multiple sound sources that could be channelled to a mixer and distributed across the stereo soundscape. A microphone was also positioned on the guitar, on Frith's seat, at his throat to record his breath, and several were placed around the studio.

The album was recorded in four days without any overdubbing. All the pieces were improvised, some completely, some to a roughly preconceived idea, and sound as they were played, except for "No Birds", which was recorded in two parts, and "Not Forgotten", from which two notes were removed. The only sounds not produced 'naturally' by guitar are those of a fuzzbox used on "Out of Their Heads (On Locoweed)", "Heat c/w Moment" and "No Birds", an echo delay used on "No Birds", and ambient noise from Frith's breath and feet on "Heat c/w Moment".

"No Birds"
30 second sample of "No Birds" illustrating Frith's prepared guitar with multiple sound sources.

On the longest track on the album, "No Birds", Frith played on two prepared guitars simultaneously, creating the timbre and range of an orchestra. He laid the two guitars flat on a table, neck to neck with the bodies of the guitars at opposite ends and the necks parallel to each other. He tuned the strings on both guitars to one note, and because they were stereo guitars with nut pickups, he had six separate sound sources coming from each guitar. Using volume pedals on some of the sound sources, he filtered sounds in and out of the mix without doing anything on the guitars.

"No Birds" is the only track on the album recorded with the guitars flat on a table. On all the other tracks the guitars are held in the "conventional position", that is against the player's body. Frith took the title of "No Birds" from the last line of a poem, "One Nest Rolls After Another" by Captain Beefheart that was printed on the back of the LP sleeve of his 1971 album, Mirror Man. Frith also used the phrase "No Birds" in the Frith/Cutler song, "Beautiful as the Moon – Terrible as an Army with Banners", which was released on Henry Cow's 1975 album, In Praise of Learning.

== Reception and influence ==
Professional ratings
Review scores
Source	Rating
AllMusic	4/5 stars
DownBeat	5/5 stars

Guitar Solos was voted one of the best albums of 1974 by New Musical Express critics. In a review in NME in November 1974, Charles Shaar Murray described it as "a totally revolutionary album" and "an undeniable landmark in the history of rock guitar". Sean Westergaard of AllMusic called Guitar Solos a landmark album because of its innovative and experimental approach to guitar playing. He said it seldom sounds like traditional guitar music, "but the pieces have a logic (and beauty, in some cases) all their own." Westergaard described the work as "challenging, avant-garde music, but [not] unapproachable." In the January 1983 edition of DownBeat magazine, Bill Milkowski wrote that on Guitar Solos "Frith unveiled a haunting collection of improvised music on prepared guitar which must have stunned listeners of the day. Even today [1983] that album stands up as uniquely innovative and undeniably daring." Piekut described Guitar Solos as "extraordinary not only for the astonishing precision and originally of Frith's technique, but for his détournement of an instrument whose entire history had been governed by a simple rule: you pluck it and it goes twang."

Nicole V. Gagné wrote in her 1990 book, Sonic Transports: New Frontiers in Our Music that the music on Guitar Solos is an "unprecedented ... lexicon of revolutionary sounds" which "leaves you wondering what guitar-playing is."^{[italics in the source]} She said Frith displays his "astounding technique" of abruptly switching "timbres, multiple rhythmic lines, subtle nuances in volume [and] harmonic densities" within a single piece of music. Gagné commented on some of the tracks:

In "Glass c/w Steel", Frith meticulously fades up, one after the other, four strands of sound, and overlays them into an eerie haze, out of which bounds a rubbery, animal-like line. As this critter bounces and jabbers, the backdrop continues to shift, eventually swelling into loud silvery bells, and then taking a protesting descent back into silence. In "Ghosts", distorted chords expand and collapse with sudden changes of volume. Those ectoplasmic sounds, in a modified form, flit about "Out of Their Heads (On Locoweed)", a track which reworks the formula of "Glass c/w Steel".

Gagné remarked that "the album's biggest surprise" is when it was recorded. She stated that it "is still light years beyond most musicians" and listeners could find themselves "falling out of love with guitarists who haven't grasped the implications of Frith's approach."

Guitar Solos attracted the attention of Brian Eno who was "excited by the timbral possibilities that [Frith had] been discovering." (Note: Frith's work had been introduced to Eno by Robert Wyatt.) Eno asked Frith to record with him, and this resulted in Frith playing guitar on two of Eno's albums, Before and After Science (1977) and Music for Films (1978). The table-top guitar setup Frith used on Guitar Solos became a standard for many of his subsequent live performances, including those recorded on his 1982 live double album Live in Japan. He later extended his technique to include "found objects", which he used on his guitars to extract new sounds.

The success of Guitar Solos spawned two follow-up albums, Guitar Solos 2 (1976) and Guitar Solos 3 (1979), which featured Frith and other improvising guitarists, including Derek Bailey and Hans Reichel. Frith coordinated and produced these albums, and employed many of the same "unorthodox techniques" he had used on Guitar Solos. When a remastered edition of the original Guitar Solos was released 28 years later on Frith's own Fred Records label, it attracted further praise from critics. Westergaard wrote that "Guitar Solos' lasting legacy is that it radically redefined the way some people think about the guitar."

== Re-issues ==
In 1991 RecRec Music (Switzerland) and East Side Digital Records (United States) re-issued Guitar Solos on CD comprising all the tracks from the original Guitar Solos LP, plus the Fred Frith tracks from the follow-up albums, Guitar Solos 2 and Guitar Solos 3, along with five previously unreleased tracks by Frith.

In 2002 Fred Records issued a remastered version of the original Guitar Solos LP with no extra tracks.

In February 2024, a fiftieth anniversary edition of Guitar Solos was released on double-LP by Week-End Records entitled Guitar Solos / Fifty. It comprises the original 1974 solo album remastered, plus a new Fred Frith solo album of 13 previously unreleased tracks. Just as the original Guitar Solos was recorded without any overdubs, Fifty also had no overdubs.

== Track listings ==
=== Original 1974 release ===
All tracks are written by Fred Frith.

Side one
No.	Title	Length
1.	"Hello Music"	1:30
2.	"Glass c/w Steel"	5:33
3.	"Ghosts"	3:07
4.	"Out of Their Heads (On Locoweed)"	8:24
Total length:		18:34

Side two
No.	Title	Length
5.	"Not Forgotten"	1:42
6.	"Hollow Music"	2:38
7.	"Heat c/w Moment"	1:37
8.	"No Birds"	12:46
Total length:		18:43

=== 1991 CD re-issue bonus tracks ===
All tracks are written by Fred Frith.

No.	Title	Length
9.	"Only Reflect"	3:58
10.	"Water/Struggle/The North"	11:08
11.	"Alienated Industrial Seagulls"	3:53
12.	"Song of River Nights"	1:23
13.	"Should Old Arthur"	1:23
14.	"Dependable Phantoms (for Hans)"	4:45
15.	"Daria's Regard"	2:10
16.	"Throw the Bolt"	2:50
17.	"New Shoes (for A.R.)"	3:13
18.	"Insomnia"	1:17

==== Track notes ====
- Tracks 9–10 were recorded on Tom Newman's barge (Argonaut Studio) in January 1976, and were originally released on the second album in the series, Guitar Solos 2 (1976).
- Tracks 11–13 were recorded at Briollay, France, in October 1978, and were originally released on the third album in the series, Guitar Solos 3 (1979).
- Tracks 14–18 were recorded at Noise, New York City, in September 1988, and were previously unreleased.

=== 2024 Double-LP release ===
All tracks are written by Fred Frith

==== Guitar Solos (1974) ====
Side one
No.	Title	Length
1.	"Hello Music"	1:31
2.	"Glass c/w Steel"	5:36
3.	"Ghosts"	3:11
4.	"Out of Their Heads (On Locoweed)"	8:31
Total length:		18:49

Side two
No.	Title	Length
5.	"Not Forgotten"	1:55
6.	"Hollow Music"	2:44
7.	"Heat c/w Moment"	1:42
8.	"No Birds"	12:42
Total length:		19:03

==== Fifty (2024) ====
Side one
No.	Title	Length
1.	"Dawns"	3:30
2.	"Outer Order"	4:28
3.	"Tempus Fugit"	2:41
4.	"Quicksilver (for Simone)"	2:04
5.	"Unterwegs (for Roman)"	3:52
6.	"Phalaropes"	1:33
Total length:		18:08

Side two
No.	Title	Length
7.	"Jack’s Neap Tide"	2:08
8.	"Schlechte Gewissen"	2:24
9.	"Move Indigo"	3:54
10.	"To Do"	1:39
11.	"The Map of Dreams"	3:28
12.	"Locomoting"	4:07
13.	"Dusks"	1:51
Total length:		19:31

Source: Bandcamp

== Personnel ==
- Fred Frith – guitars, prepared guitars

=== Production ===
- David Vorhaus – recording engineer
- Ray Smith – album sleeve photography and design

== See also ==
- Fred Frith's equipment

== Works cited ==
- Bell, Clive (January–February 2024). "Fred Frith: Take It to the Bridge". The Wire (479+480). London: 38–44. ISSN 0952-0686.
- Gagné, Nicole V. (1990). Sonic Transports: New Frontiers in Our Music. De Falco Books. ISBN 978-0-9625145-0-0.
- Milkowski, Bill (1983). "The Frith Factor: Exploration in Sound". DownBeat. Vol. 50, no. 1. Chicago: Maher Publications. pp. 22–25, 61. ISSN 0012-5768.
- Piekut, Benjamin (2019). Henry Cow: The World Is a Problem. Durham, North Carolina: Duke University Press. ISBN 978-1-47800-405-9.
