= Cut Up the Border =

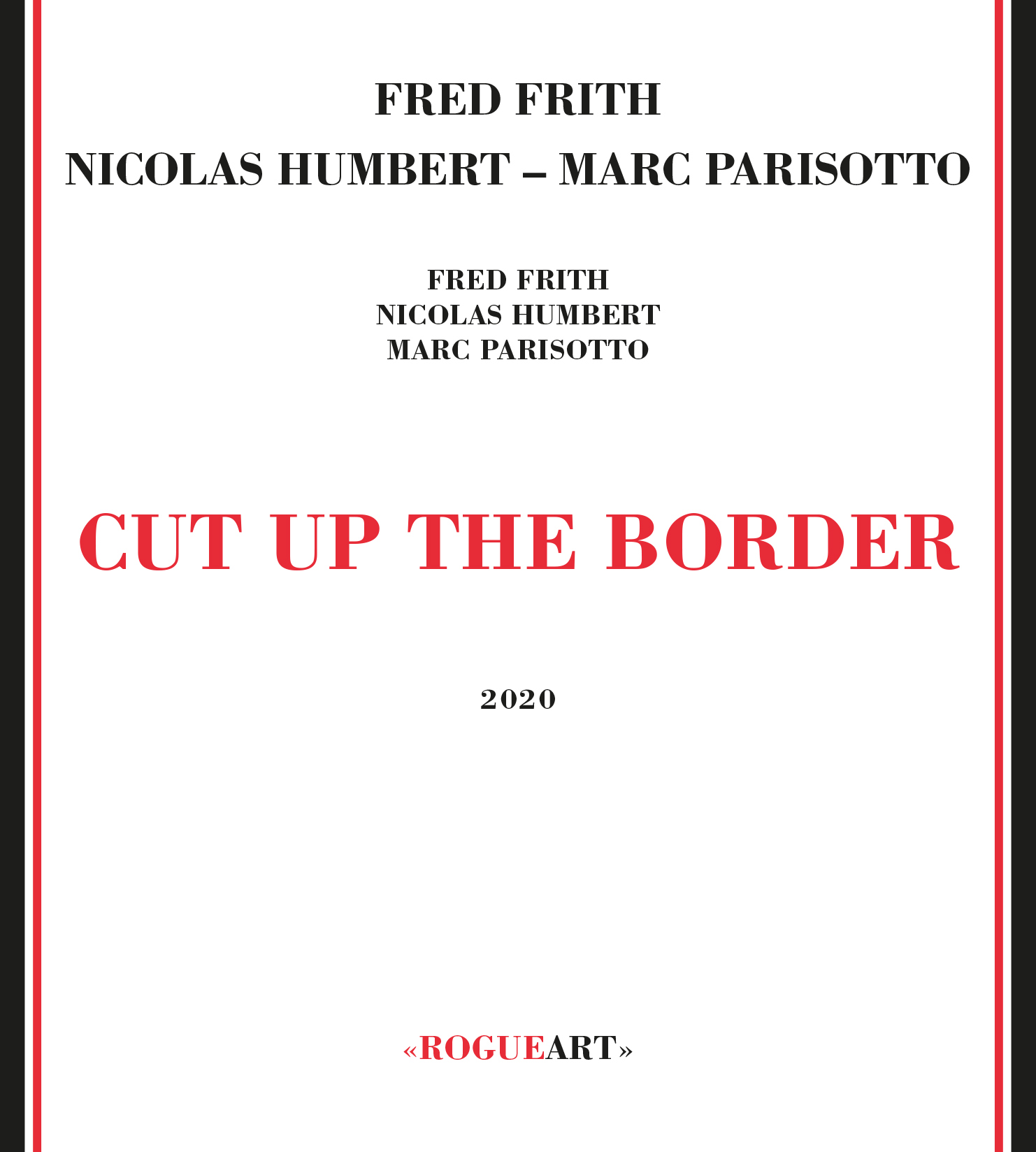

Live album by Fred Frith, Nicolas Humbert and Marc Parisotto
- Released: January 2020
- Recorded: 1988–1990, 2019
- Venue: Babylon
- Genre: Avant-garde jazz; free improvisation
- Length: 57:25
- Label: RogueArt
- Producer: Bayerischer Rundfunk / Deutschlandfunk Kultur

Fred Frith chronology
Woodwork (2019)	Cut Up the Border (2020)	Laying Demons to Rest (2023)

Cut Up the Border is a 2020 live album by English guitarist and composer Fred Frith, German film maker Nicolas Humbert and French sound artist Marc Parisotto. It comprises a collage of unused audio material recorded between 1988 and 1990 for the documentary film on Frith, Step Across the Border, overlaid with live improvisations by Frith performed in January 2019. The album was released by French record label RogueArt in January 2020.

== Development ==
Some thirty years after Step Across the Border was released, director Humbert reviewed over thirty hours of audio tape that were not used in the film. Humbert and French sound designer, Marc Parisotto used these tapes to create a sound collage of ambient noise and performances by Frith, Tom Cora, Ted Milton, Iva Bittová, Pavel Fajt, Haco and John Zorn. The result was presented at Babylon, a Berlin cinema in Mitte on 17 January 2019 with Frith improvising live over the sound piece. The performance was recorded and broadcast as a radio play by Deutschlandfunk on 15 February 2019. In October 2019, a live remix of the radio play was performed at the Kunstverein Ebersberg art gallery in Ebersberg, Germany with live improvisations from Frith and noise artist Max Bauer.

In January 2020, RogueArt released the Berlin cinema recording of the radio play on CD entitled Cut Up the Border and credited it to Fred Frith, Nicolas Humbert and Marc Parisotto.

== Reception ==
Ulrich Pfaffenberger wrote in the German daily newspaper, Süddeutsche Zeitung that the title of Humbert and Parisotto's work, Cut Up the border suggests the manner in which the sound collage was assembled: they stepped over the border and broke it up. Pfaffenberger described the resulting piece as a collection of noises associated in ways that create a new and unexpected soundscape.

Commenting on Frith's live participation at the Berlin cinema presentation of Cut Up the Border in January 2019, Thomas Mauch saw it as an opportunity for the musician to have a conversation with his past in the sound collage. Writing in Die Tageszeitung Mauch felt that, however, no real conversation took place. The proceedings were dominated by Humbert and Parisotto's audio piece, with Frith only making occasional musical remarks. Mauch stated that Frith's contribution to music and improvisation over the years, as demonstrated in Step Across the Border, is of paramount importance, but here he appeared alone and "a little lost" on the stage.

== Track listing ==
No.	Title	Writer(s)	Length
1.	"Just Call Her Nagra"	Fred Frith, Marc Parisotto, Nicolas Humbert	2:51
2.	"At Tim's House"	Frith, Parisotto, Humbert	0:58
3.	"Complex"	Frith, Parisotto, Humbert, Tom Cora	4:16
4.	"Traffic Jam"	Frith, Parisotto, Humbert	1:50
5.	"Jonas"	Parisotto, Humbert	1:25
6.	"Bach and Echo"	Frith, Parisotto, Humbert	2:10
7.	"Samurai Pachinko Concert"	Frith, Parisotto, Humbert	4:28
8.	"Le Lion de Leipzig"	Frith, Parisotto, Humbert	0:57
9.	"And If I Had a Heart"	Frith, Parisotto, Humbert, Ted Milton	7:36
10.	"Clapping Rain"	Parisotto, Humbert	2:50
11.	"Big Byt"	Iva Bittová, Pavel Fajt	2:15
12.	"Le Train Fantôme"	Frith, Parisotto, Humbert	2:13
13.	"Your Name Please"	Parisotto, Humbert	1:33
14.	"Thank You Tom"	Frith, Parisotto, Humbert, Cora	3:18
15.	"Go to the End"	Parisotto, Humbert	3:35
16.	"Lost in a Subway Station"	Parisotto, Humbert	3:56
17.	"Pacific"	Frith, Parisotto, Humbert	1:10
18.	"Haco's Cat"	Haco, Parisotto, Humbert	1:51
19.	"I'm Not Diderot"	Frith, Parisotto, Humbert	4:56
20.	"Too Loud for Dogs"	Frith, John Zorn, Parisotto, Humbert	3:17
Total length:			57:25

Source: CD liner notes, Discogs.

== Personnel ==
- Nicolas Humbert – sound collage
- Marc Parisotto – sound collage
- Fred Frith (2019 live improvisations) – guitar, bass guitar, organ, piano

=== Production and artwork ===
- Jean Vapeur – field recording, live music recording
- Gerd Baumann – studio recordings
- Michael Hinreiner – mixing, mastering
- Bayerischer Rundfunk / Deutschlandfunk Kultur – producer
- Paolo Podrescu – liner notes
- Fred Frith – additional texts
- Nicolas Humbert – additional texts
- Marc Parisotto – additional recordings, "micro impromptu", additional texts
- Michael Witte – photography
- Simone Fürbringer – photography
- Max Schoendorff – cover design
- David Bourguignon – cover realization
- Katarina Agathos – editor
- Marcus Gammel – editor

Source: CD liner notes, Discogs.
