= Another Day in Fucking Paradise =

Studio album by Fred Frith Trio
- Released: June 24, 2016
- Recorded: January 2016
- Studio: Sharkbite Studios, Oakland, California
- Genre: Experimental music; free improvisation
- Length: 48:55
- Label: Intakt (Switzerland)
- Producer: Fred Frith, Intakt Records, Patrik Landolt

Fred Frith Trio chronology
Another Day in Fucking Paradise (2016)	Closer to the Ground (2018)

Another Day in Fucking Paradise is a 2016 studio album by the Fred Frith Trio, a San Francisco Bay Area based experimental music and free improvising group featuring Fred Frith, Jason Hoopes and Jordan Glenn. It is their debut album and was recorded in Oakland, California in January 2016, and released in June 2016 by Intakt Records in Switzerland.

== Background ==
The Fred Frith Trio comprises English guitarist Fred Frith, American bassist Jason Hoopes, and American drummer/percussionist Jordan Glenn. Frith was a founding member of the English avant-rock group Henry Cow, and from 1999 has been teaching musical improvisation at Mills College in Oakland, California. Hoopes and Glenn are members of the Oakland experimental song group Jack O' The Clock.

The Fred Frith Trio formed in Oakland in 2013 and began playing at several local live venues. In February 2015 the trio toured Europe, performing in Croatia, Germany, Austria, Hungary, Italy, The Netherlands and Belgium. They toured Europe again in February 2017, performing in Norway, Austria, Turkey, France, Poland, Italy and Germany.

Frith said "When I proposed this trio I had nothing in mind beyond getting together with a couple of formidable musicians who I love and respect and seeing what would happen". It was not until after their first European tour that "some themes ... start[ed] emerging". Frith explained that he found himself drawing on his "earliest rock and roll experiences", and with Hoopes' "stunning ability to wring every-thing [sic] there is to be wrung out of an electric bass" and Glenn's "playful, irreverent, and absolute authority ... [a]nything can happen. Really. It's a bloody great feeling. I think this record captures it quite well!"

== Reception ==
Professional ratings
Review scores
Source	Rating
All About Jazz	4/5 stars
DownBeat	3.5/5 stars
Jazz Views	favorable

In a review in All About Jazz, Glenn Astarita described Another Day in Fucking Paradise as a "hardcore off-centered delicacy". He wrote that at the heart of the album Hoopes' "bursting e-bass lines", Glenn's "vigorous drumming and colorful accents", and Frith's "speed riffing [and] unearthly effects" create a "deviously entertaining" mix with "ethereal sound-shaping paradigms throughout." Astarita said that fans of Frith's experimental rock trio Massacre will enjoy this album.

In Jazz Views, Chris Baber called the album "an exhilarating and explosive kicking against the doors of improvised music". He said that while the Trio appears to continue where Massacre left off, they sound very different: Hoopes' "rich ... bass playing ... gives the music so much depth", Glenn's drumming "finds rhythmic complexity in even the darkest corners of each piece", and Frith "continues to delight in making an intelligent racket".

Izzy Yellen wrote in a review in DownBeat magazine that on Another Day the Trio creates an "often dense improvisational soundscape" that is "complex and multifaceted [but] never veers toward excess". He said the album is "[n]ot for the faint of heart", and "pushes the listener toward the brink of sensory overload", but added that it will "leave [one] tripped out and travel-weary, but ultimately in a better place".

== Track listing ==
All tracks composed by the Fred Frith Trio.

No.	Title	Length
1.	"The Origin of Marvels"	1:30
2.	"Dance of Delusion"	3:08
3.	"Poor Folly"	3:27
4.	"La Tempesta"	2:30
5.	"Glimmers of Goodbyes"	3:26
6.	"Yard With Lunatics"	11:31
7.	"Only Light and Shadow"	6:02
8.	"The Sleep of Reason"	2:19
9.	"Straw Men"	3:40
10.	"The Deserted Garden"	1:25
11.	"Schlechtes Gewissen"	4:28
12.	"Phantoms of Progress"	3:44
13.	"The Ride Home"	1:46

Sources: Intakt Records, Discogs, AllMusic.

== Personnel ==
- Fred Frith – electric guitar, voice
- Jason Hoopes – electric bass, double bass
- Jordan Glenn – drums, percussion

Sources: Intakt Records, Discogs.

=== Sound and artwork ===
Recorded at Sharkbite Studios, Oakland, California, January 2016; mixed at Guerrilla Recording and mastered at Headless Buddha, Oakland, California, March 2016.

- Scott Evans – recording engineer (Sharkbite Studios)
- Myles Boisen – remastering (Guerrilla Recording, Headless Buddha)
- Fred Frith – producer, liner notes
- Intakt Records – producer
- Patrik Landolt – producer
- Heike Liss – photography, cover art
- Jonas Schoder – graphic design

Sources: Intakt Records, Discogs.
