= Susana Santos Silva =

Portuguese jazz musician

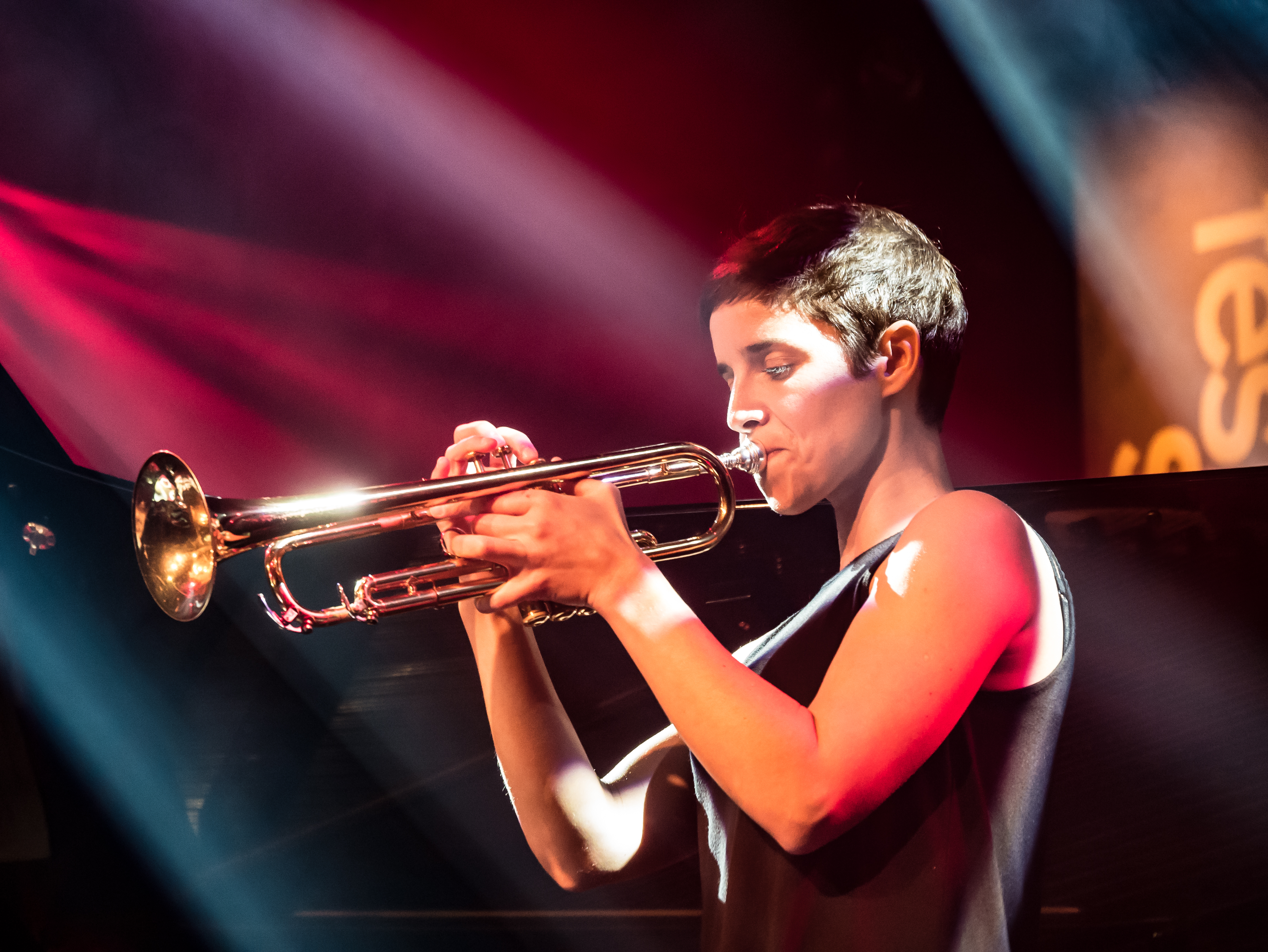
Susana Santos Silva at the 2016 Moers Festival.

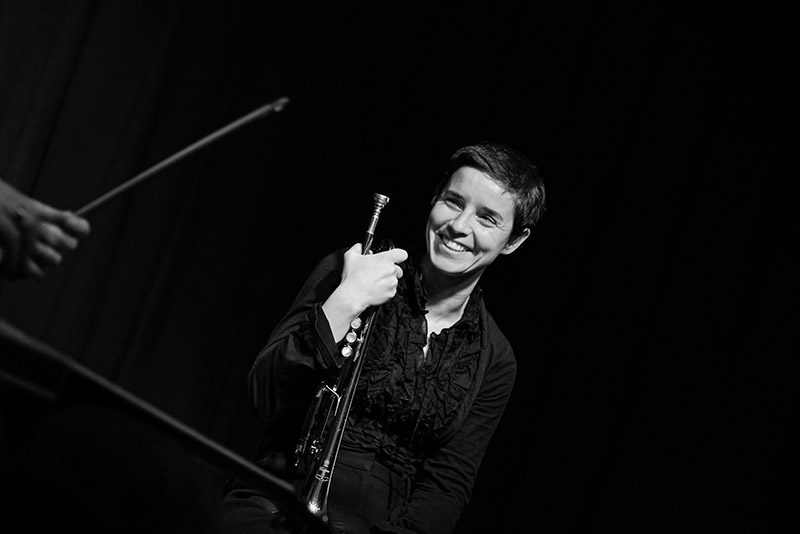
Susana Santos Silva in Aarhus Denmark 2018.

Susana Santos Silva (born 3 January 1979 in Porto, Portugal) is a Portuguese jazz and free improvisation musician (trumpet, flugelhorn, and flute).

== Biography ==
Santos studied jazz trumpet at the Music College in Porto until 2008 and then the Hochschule für Musik Karlsruhe with Reinhold Friedrich, Edward Tarr, Klaus Schuwerk and Klaus Braker, subsequently Jazz Performance at the Rotterdam Conservatory (Diplom 2010), where she played with Eric Vloeimans, Jarmo Hoogendijk and Wim Both. She played in the Orquestra Jazz de Matosinhos (inter alia with Lee Konitz, Chris Cheek, Kurt Rosenwinkel and Maria João as guest musicians in CD productions), in European Movement Jazz Orchestra (EMJO Live at Coimbra, Clean Feed Records 2011) and in the Dutch trio LAMA (with Gonçalo Almeida and Greg Smith). In 2011 Santos released her debut album Devil's Dress (Toap). She is currently working with the bassist Torbjörn Zetterberg (Almost Tomorrow, 2013, Clean Feed) and with the ensemble SSS-Q (Songs from My Backyard, 2014). All About Jazz refers to Santos as one of the most original and articulate voices of European avantgarde jazz and non-idiomatic music.

As of 2022 into 2024, Santos is a performing member of the music and dance ensemble ICTUS, based in Brussels, Belgium.

== Discography (in selection) ==
=== Solo albums ===
Susana Santos Silva Quintet (Demian Cabaud, Marcos Cavaleiro, André Fernandes, Zé Pedro Coelho)

- 2011: Devil's Dress (Tone Of A Pitch)

With Torbjörn Zetterberg

- 2013: Almost Tomorrow (Clean Feed)

With João Pedro Brandão, Hugo Raro, Torbjörn Zetterberg, and Marcos Cavaleiro

- 2015: Impermanence (Carimbo Porta-Jazz)

With Torbjörn Zetterberg and Hampus Lindwall

- 2015: If Nothing Else (Clean Feed)

With Santos Silva/Wodrascka/Meaas Svendsen/Berre

- 2016: Rasengan! (Barefoot Records)

With Santos Silva/Stadhouders/Almeida/Costa

- 2016: Buku (Cylinder Recordings)

With Lotte Anker, Sten Sandell, Torbjörn Zetterberg and Jon Fält

- 2016: Life And Other Transient Storms (Clean Feed)

=== Collaborations ===
With The European Movement Jazz Orchestra

- 2011: EMJO Live In Coimbra (Clean Feed)

With LAMA

- 2011: Oneiros (Clean Feed)
- 2013: Lamaçal (Clean Feed), featuring Chris Speed
- 2015: The Elephant's Journey (Clean Feed), featuring Joachim Badenhorst
- 2017: Metamorphosis (Clean Feed), featuring Joachim Badenhorst

With SSS-Q (Jorge Queijo)

- 2014: Songs From My Backyard (Wasser Bassin)
- 2017: S/T (Wasser Bassin), featuring Carlos Guedes

With De Beren Gieren

- 2014: The Detour Fish (Clean Feed)

With Fire! Orchestra

- 2016: Ritual (Rune Grammofon)
- 2019: Arrival (Rune Grammofon)

With Fred Frith

- 2023: Laying Demons to Rest (RogueArt)

With Kaja Draksler

- 2016: This Love (Clean Feed)

With Fred Frith Trio

- 2021: Road (Intakt)
