= Eroc =

Joachim Heinz Ehrig (born 15 November 1951), better known by his stage name Eroc, is a German musician and sound engineer. He served as the drummer and band leader of the German progressive rock group Grobschnitt from 1970 until 1983. He also released five solo albums between 1975 and 1987.

== Discography ==
=== Solo albums ===
- Eroc (1975), Brain
- Eroc Zwei (1976), Brain
- Eroc 3 (1979), Brain
- Eroc 4 (1982), Brain
- Changing Skies (1987), Metronome

=== With Hans Reichel ===
- Kino (1986), Teldec Import Service
- The Return of Onkel Boskopp (1997), Repertoire

=== With Urs Fuchs ===
- Eurosonic Experiences (1999), Wolkenreise
