= Joachim-Ernst Berendt =

German writer and record producer (1922–2000)

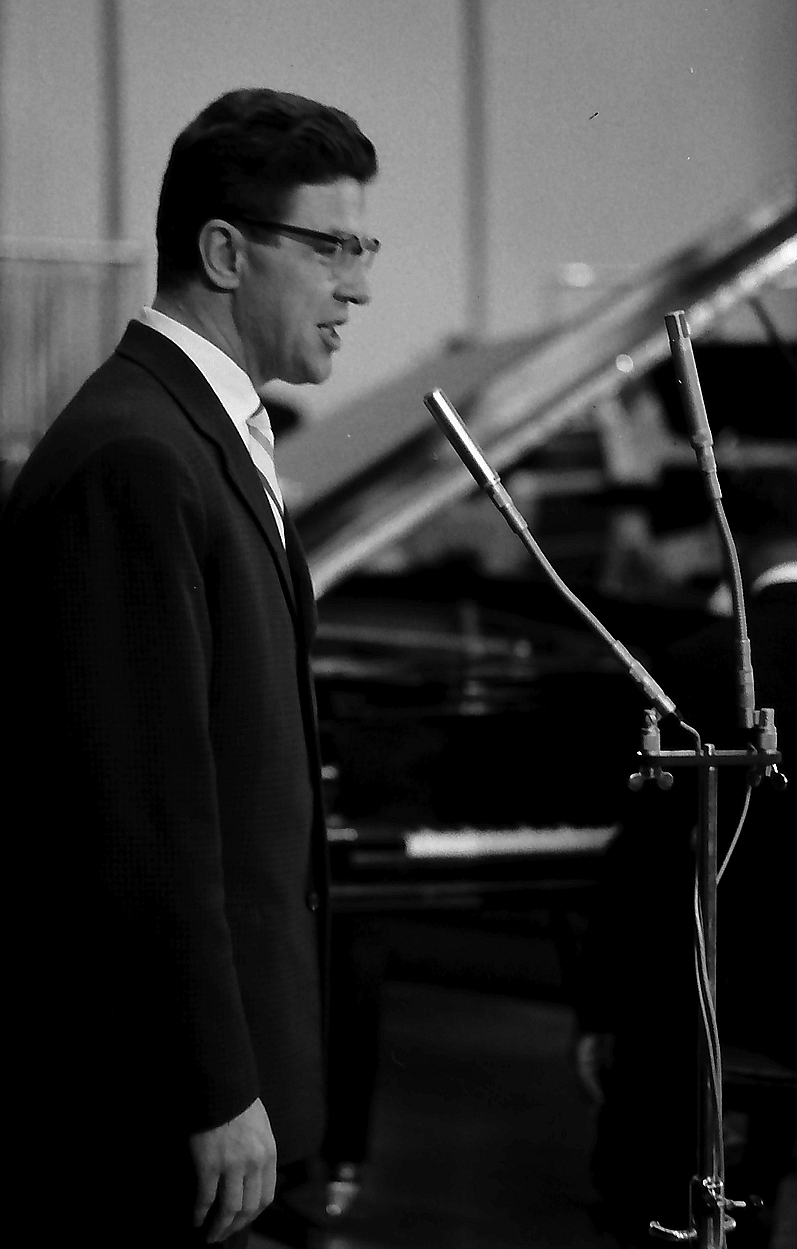
- Joachim-Ernst Berendt, Donaueschingen Festival, 1957
- Born: 20 July 1922; Berlin, Germany
- Died: 4 February 2000 (aged 77); Hamburg, Germany
- Occupations: Author, music journalist
- Father: Ernst Berendt

Joachim-Ernst Berendt (20 July 1922 – 4 February 2000) was a German music journalist, author and producer specialized on jazz.

== Life ==
Berendt was born and raised in Berlin. Berendt's father, Ernst Berendt, was a Protestant pastor belonging to the Confessing Church who was imprisoned and died in the Dachau concentration camp. J.-E. Berendt started studying Physics, but his studies were interrupted by his enlistment in the Wehrmacht. Already during the Nazi Germany years Berendt took an interest in jazz; enthusiasts in this period retreated to the underground.

After World War II, he helped founding the Südwestfunk (SWF) radio network in the then French occupation zone of Germany. From 1950 until his retirement in 1987, he was in charge of the jazz department of the SWF.

In 1952, the first German edition of Berendt's The Jazz Book was published. It became a definitive book on jazz, translated into many languages, and is still being updated and reprinted. For almost 40 years, Berendt produced the jazz program of the Baden-Baden station of the German public radio and TV network ARD. His weekly TV show Jazztime Baden-Baden and his daily radio shows were pioneering in promoting jazz in post-war Germany. Berendt later focused on world music and was one of its early promoters, founding a World Music Festival in 1965.

Berendt initiated and organized many jazz festivals (American Folk Blues Festival, Berliner Jazztage, World Expo Osaka). He was the producer of many records, mainly for MPS Records, and supported the Jazz & Lyrik project, combining jazz performances with readings of poetry (not jazz poetry).

Berendt was awarded, among others, the critic's award of German television, the culture award of Poland, and twice the Bundesfilmpreis.

Berendt died on 4 February 2000 at the age of 77, after a traffic accident in which he was involved as a pedestrian. The accident happened in Hamburg, where Berendt was on his way to a promotion event for his book Es gibt keinen Weg nur Gehen (There Is No Way, Only Going).

Berendt's huge collection of records, books, magazines, photos, and more is in the archive of the Jazzinstitut Darmstadt.

== Later work ==
In 1983, Berendt published The World Is Sound: Nada Brahma and The Third Ear: On Listening to the World. In these books Berendt investigates in listening in general, i.e. its medical, historical, physical, cultural and philosophical aspects.

This turn to philosophy also saw him becoming a disciple of the Indian mystic Osho.

== Works (selection) ==
- Jazz: A Photo History (translated by William Odom), Schirmer Books, 1979, ISBN 0-02-870290-5.
- Joachim-Ernst Berendt reads Rainer Maria Rilke "Seelenlandschaften" (Landscapes of the Soul), with music from Philip Catherine, Krzysztof Zgraja, Vladislav Sendecki; Producer: ℗1998 Horst Bösing ©2003 Jaro 4267-2

== Bibliography ==
- The Jazz Book, New York: Lawrence Hill Books
- The World Is Sound: Nada Brahma: Music and the Landscape of Consciousness, Inner Traditions
- The Third Ear: On Listening to the World
- Klangräume (1996)
- The Return of Jazz: Joachim-Ernst Berendt and West German Cultural Change, Andrew Wright Hurley, Berghahn Books (2011)

== See also ==
- Karl Lippegaus
