= Guitar Solos 3 =

Studio album by various artists
- Released: 1979
- Recorded: 1976–1978
- Genre: Experimental; free improvisation
- Length: 54:50
- Label: Rift (US)
- Producer: Fred Frith

Guitar Solos series chronology
Guitar Solos 2 (1976)	Guitar Solos 3 (1979)	Guitar Solos / Fifty (2024)

Guitar Solos 3 is the third in a series of three albums of improvised guitar solos by various musicians, and was released in the United States by Rift Records in 1979. Fred Frith coordinated and produced the series, which began with his 1974 debut solo album, Guitar Solos.

The three Frith tracks on this album were later included on the 1991 CD reissue of Frith's, Guitar Solos.

== Reception ==
In a review of Guitar Solos 3, and the previous album in this series, Guitar Solos 2, Tony Coulter wrote in Ear Magazine that "[t]raditional guitar playing is most definitely not the focus of these two LPs." He called these compilations by Frith "an indispensable introduction to the world of freely improvising guitarists." Coulter added that these albums emphasize extended technique and showcase these guitarists at their best.

Writing in Sonic Transports: New Frontiers in Our Music (1990), Nicole V. Gagné noted that Frith's three improvised pieces on the album have little in the way of recognizable guitar music. "Alienated Industrial Seagulls etc." sounds like "a motorcycle gang trashing the loading dock of a screen-door warehouse", and "Song of River Nights" "is delicate and transparent ... evoking the sounds of old timbers and ropes and water", but in neither is there anything resembling a guitar. Gagné said it is only in Frith's final track, "Should Old Arthur" – "a brief, lopsided lullaby played on one of the guitar strings with a violin bow" – that a guitar is evident.

== Track listing ==
All tracks are written by the performer

Side A
No.	Title	Performer	Length
1.	"Robert Louis Stevenson"	Henry Kaiser	3:32
2.	"Dien Da"	Kaiser	3:24
3.	"Foreign Music"	Chip Handy	3:25
4.	"Little Missy"	Handy	1:55
5.	"Total Babes"	Handy	1:57
6.	"Whistling with Guitar Accompaniment"	Peter Cusack	7:20
7.	"For A"	Keith Rowe	7:20

Side B
No.	Title	Performer	Length
1.	"Alienated Industrial Seagulls etc."	Fred Frith	3:49
2.	"Song of River Nights"	Frith	1:40
3.	"Should Old Arthur"	Frith	1:20
4.	"Memories of Hanover Lodge"	Eugene Chadbourne	4:10
5.	"Memories of Wildey Road"	Chadbourne	4:06
6.	"Ezekiel"	Davey Williams	6:12
7.	"Coming No. 4"	Akira Iijima	4:40

Source: LP liner notes, Fred Frith discography, Discogs.

== Track notes ==
Side A

- Tracks 1,2 were recorded at Walden Studios, Carmel Highlands, California on January 6, 1979
- Track 3 was recorded at home in Davis, California on December 22, 1977
- Track 4 was recorded at home in Davis, California on July 8, 1978
- Track 5 was recorded at home in Davis, California on April 1, 1978
- Track 6 was recorded in Utrecht, Holland in June 1976
- Track 7 was recorded in December 1978

Side B

- Tracks 1–3 were recorded at Briollay, France in October 1978
- Tracks 4,5 were recorded at Grogkill Studio, Willow, New York on November 27, 1978
- Track 6 was recorded at Trans Studio, Tuscaloosa, Alabama on September 28, 1978
- Track 7 was recorded at Saito Studio, Tokyo on November 28, 1978

Source: LP liner notes, Fred Frith discography.

== Personnel ==
- Fred Frith – guitar
- Henry Kaiser – guitar
- Chip Handy – prepared guitar
- Peter Cusack – acoustic guitar
- Keith Rowe – guitars
- Eugene Chadbourne – Dobro, guitar
- Davey Williams – guitar
- Akira Iijima – acoustic guitar

=== Sound and artwork ===
- Masahiko Ebitani – engineer (track B7)
- Mike Mantler – engineer (tracks B4, B5)
- Tetsuo Saito – engineer (track B7)
- Jean-Paul Bossard – engineer (tracks B1–B3)
- Alfreda Benge – sleeve design

Source: LP liner notes, Fred Frith discography, Discogs.
