= Kaja Draksler =

Slovenian pianist and composer

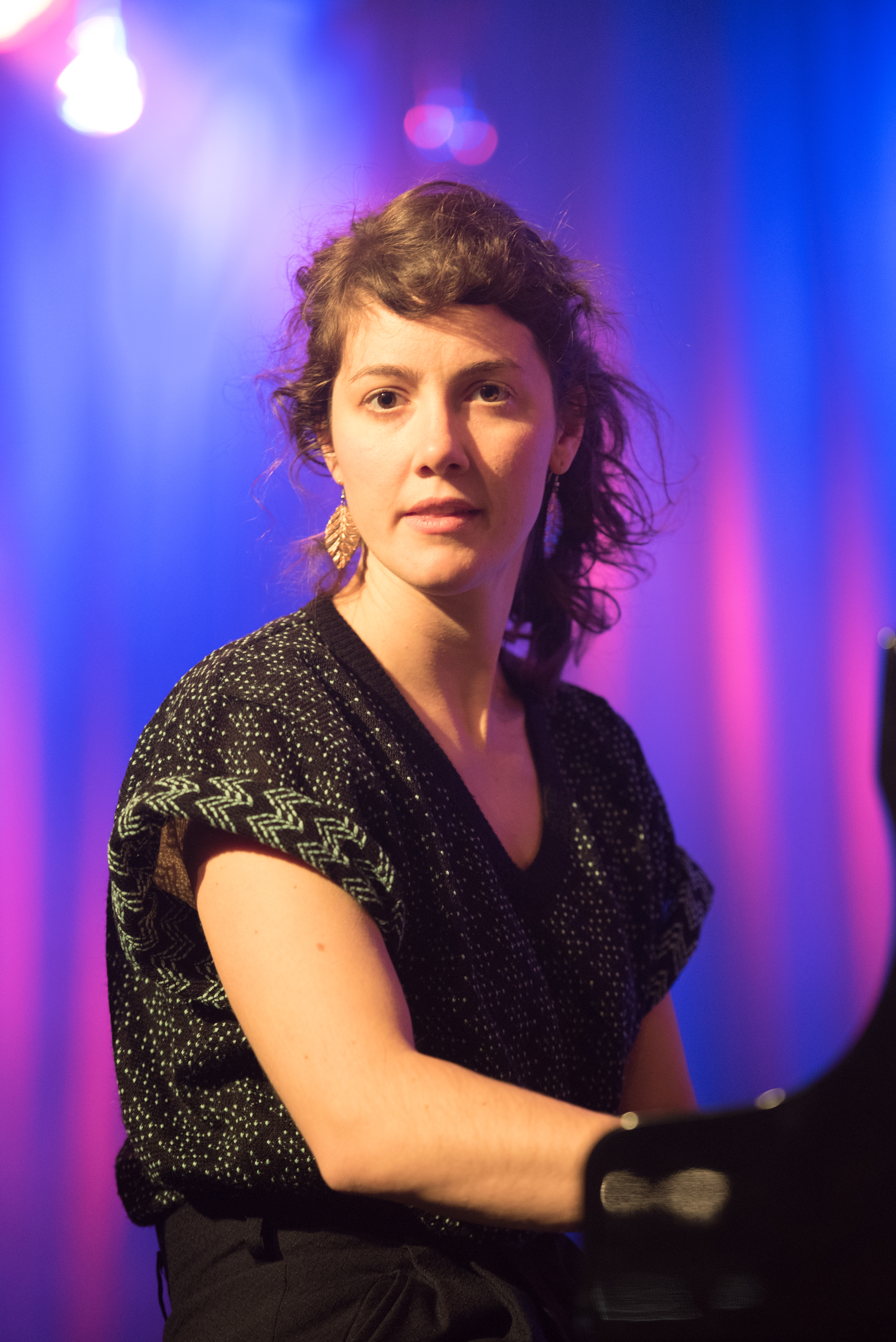
- Kaja Draksler at the 2016 Moers Festival.

Background information
- Born: 6 February 1987 (age 39); Kranj, Slovenia
- Origin: Slovenia
- Genres: Jazz, classical music
- Occupations: Musician and composer
- Instrument: Piano
- Labels: Clean Feed, Intakt
- Website: www.kajadraksler.com

Kaja Draksler (born 6 February 1987 in Kranj, Slovenia) is a Slovenian pianist and composer.

== Biography ==
Draksler started playing the piano at the age of 4, and graduated from the Ljubljana High School of Music in 2005. She graduated at the Conservatory in Groningen where she studied jazz piano in 2009. Until 2013, she studied composition under Richard Ayres at the Conservatorium van Amsterdam. She wrote her final thesis on the structures within improvisation of the American pianist Cecil Taylor. She occasionally stayed in New York to have lessons with Jason Moran and Vijay Iyer.

While studying in Groningen, Draksler performed with her Acropolis Quintet. About the same time, she co-founded the BadBooshBand. Her solo performance at the Ljubljana Jazz Festival was released on CD in 2013. She performed with Susana Santos Silva at the Moers Festival. In 2016 she also played at the Moldejazz with Susana Santos Silva. At the 2017 JazzFest Berlin she impressed the audience in a trio with Petter Eldh and Christian Lillinger.

In 2007 she was a part of the European Movement Jazz Orchestra, for which she also composed music (the CD Live in Coimbra 2007). In 2007 she wrote the concert Orpheus and Eurydice for accordion and orchestra, which was premiered and recorded by Janez Dovč and the Slovenian Philharmonic Orchestra. She also composed for the Metropole Orkest and the Italian Instabile Orchestra.

== Style ==
Draksler's music has been described as being "in the border area and in the intersection of jazz, free improvised music, classical modernism and new music". It contains some elements of folk music of the Balkans and Slovenia, functioning "in the sense of an imaginary folklore". Draksler has been heavily influenced by Cecil Taylor; whom she wrote a dissertation on.

== Honors ==
- 2009: Draksler won the Dutch Deloitte Jazz Award.

== Discography ==
=== Albums ===
- 2008: Akropola (Goga), with Robert Jukič, Kristijan Krajnčan, George Dumitriu, Jure Pukl, and Goran Krmac
- 2010: Türkü (Goga/CDBaby), Kaja Draksler Acropolis Quartet feat. Sanem Kalfa
- 2013: The Lives of Many Others (Clean Feed)
- 2017: Gledalec (Clean Feed), Kaja Draksler Octet
- 2021: Soothe My Soul, Feed My Thought (Idyllic Noise) Vinyl only album
- 2026: Bare, Unfolding, Kaja Draksler Octet

=== Collaborations ===
- 2011: EMJO Live In Coimbra (Clean Feed)
- 2014: The Best Of, BadBooshBand (ZKP Slovenija)
- 2015: Bums, Feecho, (El Negocito Records)
- 2015: Miniatures from our Living Room, Čudars-Draksler Duo (self-released)
- 2016: This Love (Clean Feed Records), with Susana Santos Silva
- 2017: To Pianos (Clean Feed), Kaja Draksler, Eve Risser
- 2018: Punkt.Vrt.Plastik (Intakt Records), Kaja Draksler, Petter Eldh and Christian Lillinger
- 2020: The Swim (Terp Records), Kaja Draksler, Terrie Ex
- 2021: Somit (Intakt), Punkt.Vrt.Plastik with Petter Eldh and Christian Lillinger
- 2026: Kompress (Intakt), Punkt.Vrt.Plastik with Petter Eldh and Christian Lillinger
