= 1974 NME Critics End of Year Poll =

This is the list of the best albums voted by the NME critics at the end of 1974. This was the first year the list was published. A ranked singles list was not compiled this year.

== List of best albums ==
1. Pretzel Logic – Steely Dan
2. It's Only Rock 'n' Roll – Rolling Stones
3. Before the Flood – Bob Dylan
4. 461 Ocean Boulevard – Eric Clapton
5. Todd – Todd Rundgren
6. On The Beach – Neil Young
7. Rock Bottom – Robert Wyatt
8. Fulfillingness First Finale – Stevie Wonder
9. Country Life – Roxy Music
10. AWB – Average White Band
11. Future Days – Can
12. Smiler – Rod Stewart
13. Secret Treaties – Blue Öyster Cult
14. Maria Muldaur – Maria Muldaur
15. Another Saturday Night – Various Artists
16. Sold American – Kinky Friedman
17. On The Border – Eagles
18. Court and Spark – Joni Mitchell
19. Odds & Sods – The Who
20. Kimono My House – Sparks
21. Okie – J. J. Cale
22. Grievous Angel – Gram Parsons
23. Radio City – Big Star
24. Mysterious Traveller – Weather Report
24. Sheer Heart Attack – Queen
24. Big Fun – Miles Davis
27. Rock 'n' Roll Animal – Lou Reed
28. Deal Gone Down – Michael Chapman
28. I Want To See The Bright Lights Tonight – Richard and Linda Thompson
28. It's Too Late To Stop Now – Van Morrison
31. Teasin' – Cornell Dupree
31. Close Up the Honky Tonks – Flying Burrito Brothers
33. Feats Don't Fail Me Now – Little Feat
33. Veedon Fleece – Van Morrison
35. Paradise And Lunch – Ry Cooder
35. Dreamer – Bobby Bland
37. In Concert – Beach Boys
37. Fear – John Cale
37. For Everyman – Jackson Browne
37. His California Album – Bobby Bland
41. Limited Edition – Can
42. The Psychomodo – Cockney Rebel
42. Good For You Too – Toni Brown
42. Live – Marvin Gaye
45. Live from Deep in the Heart of Texas – Commander Cody
46. All American Boy – Rick Derringer
46. Pretty Much Your Standard Ranch Stash – Mike Nesmith
46. Streetwalkers – Chapman-Whitney
46. Keep On Smilin' – Wet Willie
46. Planet Waves – Bob Dylan
51. Anthology – Marvin Gaye
52. Soon Over Babaluma – Can
52. Spyglass Guest – Greenslade
54. Sneakin' Sally Through the Alley – Robert Palmer
55. Propaganda – Sparks
56. The Shipbuilder – Bob Pegg & Nick Strutt
56. Learn To Love It – Jesse Winchester
56. Guitar Solos – Fred Frith
59. Angel's Egg – Gong
59. Good Old Boys – Randy Newman

== See also ==
- NME Album of the Year
- NME Single of the Year
