= Storytelling (Fred Frith album) =

Live album by Fred Frith
- Released: 18 August 2017
- Recorded: 18 March 2017
- Venue: Theater Gütersloh, Germany
- Genre: Avant-garde jazz
- Length: 61:54
- Label: Intuition (Germany)
- Producer: Volker Dueck

Fred Frith chronology
Propaganda (2015)	Storytelling (2017)	All Is Always Now – Live at The Stone (2019)

Storytelling: Live at Theater Gütersloh is a 2017 live album by English guitarist Fred Frith. It was performed by Frith in a trio with Danish saxophonist Lotte Anker and Swiss percussionist Samuel Dühsler on 18 March 2017 at the Theater Gütersloh in North Rhine-Westphalia, Germany. The recording was released on 18 August 2017 by Intuition in Germany as Volume 12 of its European Jazz Legends series.

Storytelling comprises three pieces of improvised music, plus an interview with Frith conducted by Götz Bühler. The New York City Jazz Record listed the album as one of its "Honorable Mentions New Releases" in 2017.

== Reception ==
Professional ratings
Review scores
Source	Rating
DownBeat	3/5 stars

Reviewing the album in DownBeat, Martin Longley wrote that the trio switch freely between "complete abstraction and repeating structures" and "free-form and melody". He said that in the "Storytelling" suite there is "a gathering sense of mystery" as the music unfolds, before it becomes "rougher, more agitated", and culminates in a "hyperactive climax" at the end of "Chapter 3". Martin Laurentius wrote in Jazz Thing that on this album the trio follow their instincts. He described the "Storytelling" suite as complex avant-garde music comprising polyphonic layers with rhythmic overlays that swell and fade before building to a climax at the end.

== Track listing ==
All tracks are written by Fred Frith, Lotte Anker and Samuel Dühsler, except where noted.

No.	Title	Length
1.	"Storytelling (for Eduardo Galeano) – Chapter 1"	15:31
2.	"Storytelling (for Eduardo Galeano) – Chapter 2"	12:22
3.	"Storytelling (for Eduardo Galeano) – Chapter 3"	5:36
4.	"La Pasión de Soñar"	17:15
5.	"Backsliding"	4:51
6.	"Interview with Fred Frith" (Götz Bühler)	6:19

Sources: Liner notes, AllMusic, Discogs, Fred Frith discography.

== Personnel ==
- Fred Frith – guitar
- Lotte Anker – saxophones
- Samuel Dühsler – drums

Sources: Liner notes, Discogs, Fred Frith discography.

=== Sound and artwork ===
Recorded at Theater Gütersloh, Germany on 18 March 2017

- Holger Siedler – recording engineer
- Georg Nieshusmann – supervising engineer
- Volker Dueck – producer
- Lutz Voigtländer – photography
- Knut Schötteldreier – cover design
- Götz Bühler – liner notes

Sources: Liner notes, Discogs, Fred Frith discography.
