= Road (Fred Frith Trio album) =

Live album by Fred Frith Trio
- Released: October 15, 2021
- Recorded: October 4, 18 and 31, 2019
- Venue: Week-End Fest, Stadthalle Köln, Germany; Altes Kino, Ebersberg, Germany; Old Cabell Hall, University of Virginia, Charlottesville, Virginia
- Genre: Experimental music; free improvisation
- Length: 104:11
- Label: Intakt (Switzerland)
- Producer: Fred Frith, Intakt Records

Fred Frith Trio chronology
Closer to the Ground (2018)	Road (2021)

Road is a 2021 double-CD live album by the Fred Frith Trio, an experimental music and free improvising group featuring Fred Frith (guitar), Jason Hoopes (bass) and Jordan Glenn (drums). It is their third album and their first live release. The album was recorded in Charlottesville, Virginia and Germany in October 2019, and was released in October 2021 by Intakt Records in Switzerland.

Road also includes two guest musicians, Lotte Anker (saxophone) and Susana Santos Silva (trumpet), whom the Trio had invited to perform with them during their US East Coast and European tours in October 2019. Anker and Santos Silva had previously performed with the Trio on several occasions: Anker in New York City and San Francisco, and Santos Silva in Brazil.

== Reception ==
Professional ratings
Review scores
Source	Rating
Jazzwise	3/5 stars

In a review of Road on the Best of Jazz website, Paul Medrano wrote that the album's first CD introduces the listener to the trio's music. It starts out with elements of jazz-rock sounding not unlike King Crimson and Frank Zappa, then progresses into experimental jazz and the group's "other dimension". Medrano said the inclusion of Anker and Santos Silva ("two extraordinary guests") on the second disc brings another layer of possibility to the trio's music, enhancing its "spirit, sound, and intention". Medrano called Road "an amazing album", which, despite being recorded live, is "purely electrifying".

Writing in the British music magazine, The Wire, Clive Bell described the mood on Road as "kick-ass", and the intensity as "high". He said the improvisation switches seamlessly from "hard scrabble" to "lyrical [and] tonal". Bell added that sometimes Frith's guitar appears to "float off into a reverb-drenched dreamland", leaving the rest of the group sounding, just for a moment, "slightly lost".

Reviewing Road in the Swiss jazz and blues magazine, Jazz’n’more, Ruedi Ankli called the trio's performance at the Week-End Fest in the Köln town hall, "breathtaking". He said their improvisation with snatches of melodies and rhythms that grow and collapse is "extraordinary". Ankli complimented Anker and Santos Silva's contributions to the concerts on the second disc. He said their saxophone and trumpet rhythms give the trio new ways to improvise. Ankli said both CDs are "refreshing" in their complexity and boldness.

Daniel Spicer wrote in the British monthly, Jazzwise, that, as on the group's two previous albums, Frith once again displays his "lateral thinking and restless creativity". Spicer said on the first CD, the trio "wanders unhurriedly from lumbering riffage to diaphanous soundscape", while on the second, guest Anker "slides from an assured, earthy tone to keening cry" and Santos Silva "unlocks a trove of extended techniques, from liquid ululations to blustery barrages". Spicer concluded that "It’s rare indeed that improvised music is simultaneously as accessible and cerebral as this."

== Track listing ==
All tracks are written by Fred Frith Trio except where noted.

CD 1
No.	Title	Writer(s)	Length
1.	"Lost Weekend 1"		11:38
2.	"Lost Weekend 2"		3:18
3.	"Lost Weekend 3"		5:02
4.	"Lost Weekend 4"		12:12
5.	"Lost Weekend 5"		4:05
6.	"Lost Weekend 6"		7:55
7.	"Lost Weekend 7"		4:50
Total length:			49:00

CD 2
No.	Title	Writer(s)	Length
1.	"Color of Heat"	Fred Frith Trio, Susana Santos Silva	18:50
2.	"The Trees Speak"	Fred Frith Trio, Lotte Anker	13:46
3.	"Sinking In"	Fred Frith Trio, Anker	7:41
4.	"Color of Heart"	Fred Frith Trio, Santos Silva	14:54
Total length:			55:11

Sources: Intakt Records,

== Personnel ==
- Fred Frith – electric guitar, voice
- Jason Hoopes – electric bass
- Jordan Glenn – drums

=== Guests ===
- Lotte Anker – saxophones (CD 2, tracks 2, 3)
- Susana Santos Silva – trumpet (CD 2, tracks 1, 4)

Sources: Intakt Records,

== Sound and artwork ==
- CD 1 recorded at Week-End Fest, Stadthalle Köln, Germany, October 18, 2019
- CD 2, tracks 1 and 4 recorded at Old Cabell Hall, University of Virginia, Charlottesville, Virginia, October 4, 2019
- CD 2, tracks 2 and 3 recorded at Altes Kino, Ebersberg, Germany, October 31, 2019
- Mixed and compiled at Guerrilla Recording, Oakland, California, May 12, 2021
- Mastered at Headless Buddha, Oakland, California, July 23, 2021
- Myles Boisen – engineer
- Fred Frith – producer
- Intakt Records – producer
- Heike Liss – photography, cover art
- Fiona Ryan – graphic design

Sources: Intakt Records,
