= Grobschnitt =

West German musical group

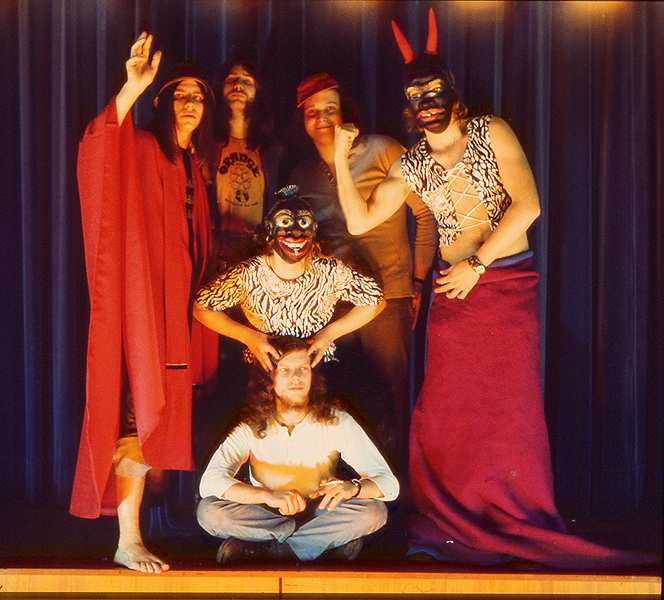
- Grobschnitt in 1974: Lupo, Eroc, Wildschwein, McPorneaux, Mist, and Toni Moff Mollo

Background information
- Origin: West Germany
- Genres: Psychedelic rock; progressive rock; Krautrock; pop
- Years active: 1970–1989, 2007–present
- Label: Brain Records
- Members: Milla Kapolke; Manu Kapolke; Demian Hache; Deva Tattva; Toni Moff Mollo (Rainer Loskand); A.T.S. (Admiral Top Sahne); Nuki; Willi Wildschwein (Stefan Danielak)
- Past members: Eroc (Joachim Ehrig); Lupo (Gerd Otto Kühn); Mist (Volker Kahrs); Willi Wildschwein (Stefan Danielak); Popo (Wolfgang Jäger); Toni Moff Mollo (Rainer Loskand); Milla Kapolke
- Website: http://www.grobschnitt-band.de

Grobschnitt was a West German rock band which existed between 1970 and 1989. Describing their style as "Solar Music", the band mixed psychedelic rock with hard rock in the 1970s, before shifting to a more mainstream pop and rock style in the 1980s. Grobschnitt, unlike other bands, utilized humor in their music in the form of unexpected noises and silly lyrics and concepts.

As was common with many German bands of the time, Grobschnitt sang in English until the early 1980s, despite touring exclusively in West Germany. The band accrued a loyal fan base through its live performances which included pyrotechnics and German comedic sketches. Highlight performances include Solar Music, an extended mostly instrumental piece which lasted up to an hour. Grobschnitt were also known for their stamina on stage, frequently performing shows in excess of three hours.

== History ==
=== 1970s ===
Grobschnitt was formed in 1970 by members of The Crew, a psychedelic rock band led by drummer Eroc (Joachim Ehrig). Their new name meant "rough cut", in reference to the style of tobacco.

Originally an eight-piece band, Grobschnitt released their self-titled album on Brain Records in 1972 before paring down into their standard five-piece unit. Their first record is stylistically very different from the symphonic sound that became their hallmark.

Ballermann, released in 1974, featured new classically trained keyboardist Mist (Volker Kahrs). Released as a double-album, Ballermann featured humor and silly songs which followed from their entertaining live shows. The second record contains the first released version of "Solar Music", an extended instrumental suite with origins in a piece by The Crew in the late 1960s. "Solar Music" would see frequent performances throughout the band's career as well as being released in two more versions during the band's existence.

By 1975, Wolfgang "Popo" Jäger joined Grobschnitt as a bassist and the group released Jumbo. Jumbo fully realized the symphonic style the band had developed, featuring lush keyboard usage. 1977 saw the release of Rockpommel's Land after a German lyric release of Jumbo in 1976. Rockpommel's Land would prove to be Grobschnitt's first commercial success, despite the waning appeal of progressive rock.

Solar Music Live, released in 1978, consists of a longer version of the "Solar Music" suite first revealed on Ballermann. Solar Music Live was a commercial success.

By 1979 Grobschnitt moved towards shorter song-oriented releases. Merry-Go-Round would be Grobschnitt's last release in the 1970s. Its songs made humorous digs at the disco music trend, commercialism and America.

=== 1980s ===
Grobschnitt released another live album, Volle Molle, in 1980, documenting the recent Merry-Go-Round tour. Popo was soon replaced by Milla Kapolke, before recording the Illegal album in 1980. The subsequent Illegal tour was highly successful.

Keyboardist Mist left Grobschnitt before the 1982 recording of Razzia, a NDW-influenced album. Toni Moff Mollo, a friend of Eroc and long-time performer in live shows, was promoted to full member. Grobschnitt's single from Razzia, "Wir wollen leben" ("We Want to Live"), remains a minor footnote in NDW history and proved to be the band's last success.

Eroc left Grobschnitt by June 1983, leaving Lupo as band leader. In 1984 Grobschnitt released Kinder und Narren, sporting a distinctly 80s sound with the help of the DX7 synthesizer. Grobschnitt, having abandoned "Solar Music" for several years released a new live version in 1985, Sonnentanz: Live. Another rock-pop album named Fantasten followed in 1987.

After Eroc's departure members of Grobschnitt became more transient, many of whom came from the NDW band Extrabreit. Eventually, with the release of Last Party Live in 1989 Grobschnitt disbanded.

=== Next Party ===
Interest in Grobschnitt led to a partial band reunion from May 2007 with Wildschwein, Milla Kapolke and Toni Moff Mollo. Their repertoire consists of classic Grobschnitt songs throughout their career. Dubbed "Next Party", they performed several concerts in 2007 and 2008. Hopes of a full reunion were dashed with the death of Wolfgang Jäger on May 3, 2007. In 2008, Grobschnitt, after 17 years of "silence", released their CD: Grobschnitt Live 2008.

=== Deaths ===
Former band member Mist (Volker Kahrs) died on July 20, 2008, at age 57. Circumstances were unknown or not released to the public.

== Personnel ==
Founding members

- Stefan Danielak (Willi Wildschwein) – lead vocals, rhythm guitar, saxophone (1970–1989, 2006–2012, 2019–)
- Gerd Otto Kühn (Lupo) – lead guitar (1970–1989, 2019–)
- Joachim Ehrig (Eroc) – drums, percussion (1970–1983)
- Bernhard Uhlemann (Baer) – bass (1970–1972, 1973–1975)
- Hermann Quetting (Quecksilber) – keyboards (1970–1972)
- Alex Harlos (Felix) – drums, percussion (1970–1972)
- Rainer Loskand (Toni Moff Mollo) – lights, vocals (1970–1989, 2006–2012)

Later members

- Volker Kahrs (Mist) – keyboards (1972–1982; died 2008)
- Wolfgang Jäger (Popo / Hunter) – bass (1975–1979; died 2007)
- Michael Kapolke (Milla Kapolke) – bass, vocals (1979–1989, 2006–2012)
- Jürgen Cramer (JR) – keyboard (1982–1985)
- Peter Jureit – drums (1983–1985)
- Thomas Wasskönig (Tarzan) – keyboards (1985–1989)
- Harald Eller (Commodore Stulle) – bass (1989)
- Rolf Möller (Admiral Top Sahne) – drums (1985–1989, 2006–2012)
- Dirk Lindemann (Sugar Zuckermann) – keyboards (1989)

Reunion era

- Stefan Danielak Jr. (Nuki) (2006–)
- Manu Kapolke – guitar, background vocals (2006–2012)
- Deva Tattva (Tatti) – keyboards (2006–2012)
- Demian Hache – percussion, drums (2006–2012)

Lineups
Over the years, the line-up of Grobschnitt changed frequently:

- 1970–1972: Eroc (dr), Felix (dr), Lupo (lg), Willi (rg, voc, sax), Baer (b), Mercury (k), Toni Moff Mollo (voc, light)
- 1972–1974: Eroc (dr), Lupo (lg), Willi (rg, voc, sax), Mist (k), Baer (b), Toni Moff Mollo (voc, light)
- 1974–1980: Eroc (dr), Lupo (lg), Willi (rg, voc, sax), Mist (k), Popo a.k.a. Hunter (b), Toni Moff Mollo (voc, light)
- 1980–1982: Eroc (dr), Lupo (lg), Willi (rg, voc, sax), Mist (k), Milla Kapolke (b), Toni Moff Mollo (voc, light)
- 1982–1983: Eroc (dr), Lupo (lg), Willi (rg, voc, sax), Cramer (k), Milla Kapolke (b), Toni Moff Mollo (voc, light)
- 1983–1984: P. Jureit (dr), Lupo (lg), Willi (rg, voc, sax), J. Cramer (k), Milla Kapolke (b), Toni Moff Mollo (voc, light)
- 1985: P. Jureit (dr), Lupo (lg), Willi (rg, voc, sax), Tarzan (k), Milla Kapolke (b), Toni Moff Mollo (voc, light)
- 1985–1988: Admiral Top Sahne (dr), Lupo (lg), Willi (rg, voc, sax), Tarzan (k), Milla Kapolke (b), Toni Moff Mollo (voc, light)
- 1988–1989: Admiral Top Sahne (dr), Lupo (lg), Willi (rg, voc, sax), Sugar (k), Commodore Stulle (b), Toni Moff Mollo (voc, light)
- 2007–2012: Admiral Top Sahne (dr), Stefan Danielak Jr. (lg, rg), Willi (rg, voc), Deva Tattva (k), Milla Kapolke (b), Toni Moff Mollo (voc, light), Manu Kapolke (lg, rg), Demian Hache (perc)
- 2019–: Lupo (voc, acoustic guitar), Willi (acoustic guitar), Stefan Danielak Jr. (acoustic guitar)

== Discography ==
=== Main releases ===
- Grobschnitt (1972)
- Ballermann (1974)
- Jumbo (1975) (in English)
- Jumbo (mit deutschen Texten) (1976) (in German)
- Rockpommel's Land (1977)
- Solar Music Live (1978)
- Merry-Go-Round (1979)
- Volle Molle (1980)
- Illegal (1980)
- Razzia (1982)
- Kinder und Narren (1984)
- Sonnentanz (1985)
- Fantasten (1987)
- Last Party Live (1990)
- Grobschnitt Live 2008 (2008)

All releases in West Germany / Germany, with the following additions:

- Rockpommel's Land (Canada, Bomb Records, 1978?)

=== Singles ===
- Sonnenflug / Der Clown (1976) ("Sun Flight" / "The Clown")
- Merry-Go-Round / Coke-Train (1978)
- Joker / Waldeslied (1980) ("Song of the Wood")
- Silent Movie / Raintime (1981)
- Wir wollen leben / Wir wollen sterben (1982) ("We Want to Live" / "We Want to Die")
- Wie der Wind / Geradeaus (1984) ("Like the Wind" / "Straight ahead")
- Fantasten (1987)
- Unser Himmel (1987) ("Our Heaven")

=== Compilations ===
- Grobschnitt (1978)
- The International Story (2006)

=== Archival releases ===
- Die Grobschnitt Story 1 (1994)
- Die Grobschnitt Story 2 (1998)
- Die Grobschnitt Story 3: The History of Solar Music Vol. 1 (2001)
- Die Grobschnitt Story 3: The History of Solar Music Vol. 2 (2002)
- Die Grobschnitt Story 3: The History of Solar Music Vol. 3 (2002)
- Die Grobschnitt Story 3: The History of Solar Music Vol. 4 (2003)
- Die Grobschnitt Story 4: Illegal Tour 1981 Complete (2003)
- Die Grobschnitt Story 3: The History of Solar Music Vol. 5 (2004)
- Die Grobschnitt Story 5 (2004)
- Die Grobschnitt Story 6: Rockpommel's Land And Elsewhere... (2006)
- Die Grobschnitt Story 0: Kapelle Elias Grobschnitt (2010)

=== Silver Mint Series ===
"Silver Mint Series" is a set of full concert recordings remastered and released by Eroc. Each multiple-CD concert is being released one CD at a time, three every six months until 2009. Confirmed concert releases are:

- Hagen 1971
- Plochingen 1976
- Bielefeld 1977
- Emden 1979
- Wesel 1979
- Donaueschingen 1981
- Osnabrück 1981
- Düsseldorf 1983
