= Daniel Fishkin =

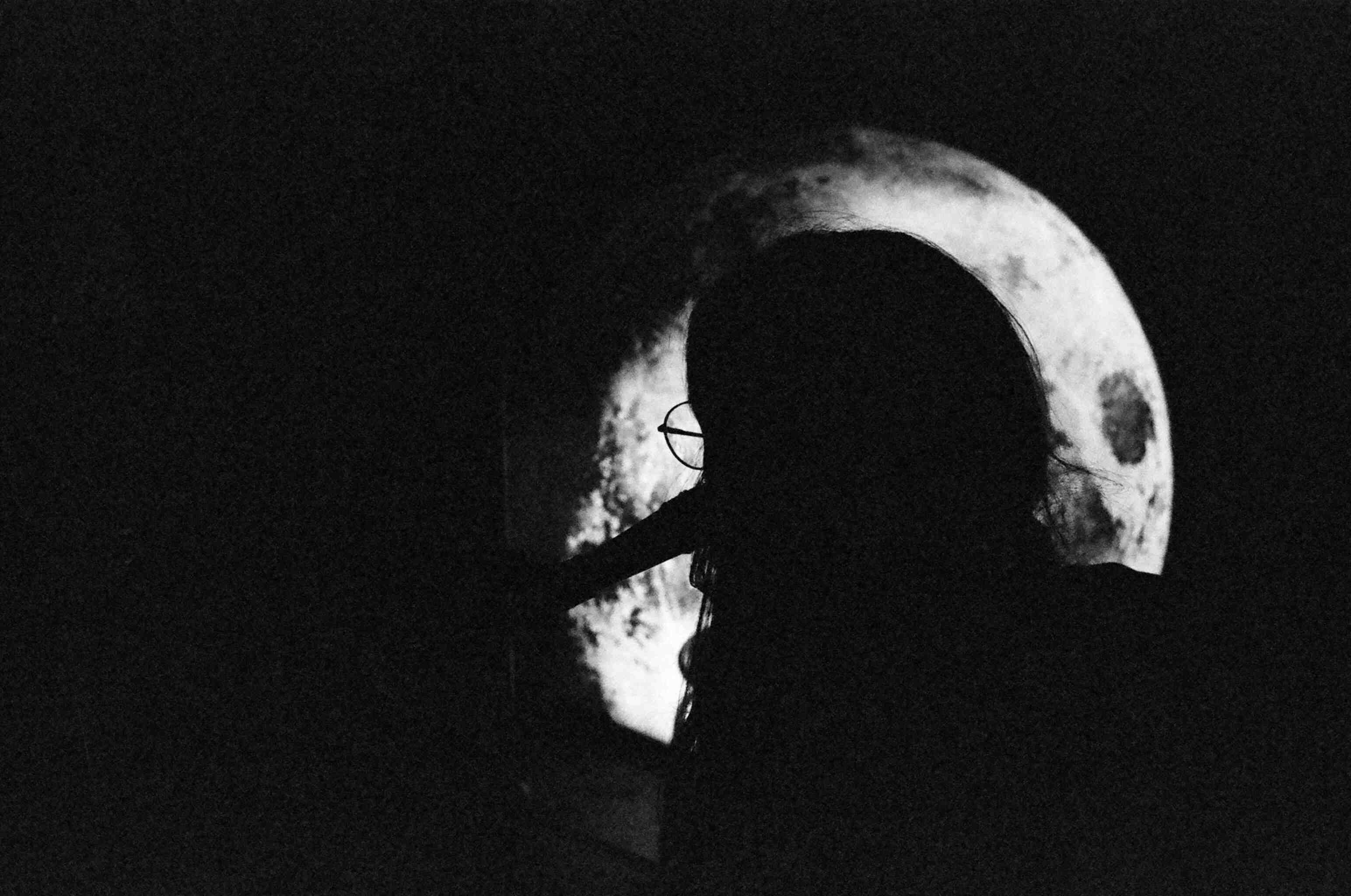
- Daniel Fishkin in performance

Background information
- Genres: Experimental
- Occupations: Composer, musician, Singer
- Instruments: Daxophone, circuits, Lady's Harp
- Years active: 2009–present
- Website: dfiction.com

Daniel Fishkin is a multi-instrumentalist, composer, and instrument designer, most notable for his installation Composing the Tinnitus Suites.

Fishkin's music career first started with building a daxophone, composing the album You're A Strong One on the daxophone. He has worked with Hans Reichel, inventor of the daxophone, building instruments and gathering instructions which Fishkin has shared on his website, 3 years after Reichel's death. After working mainly with the daxophone, he started creating experimental musical instruments based on electronic circuits to perceive the interactions between light and sound. These photosensitive instruments not only work by interpreting light input, but also by changing sound based on voltage changes caused by human touch.

Fishkin has tinnitus, which shapes most of his work.
