= Daxophone =

Experimental musical instrument

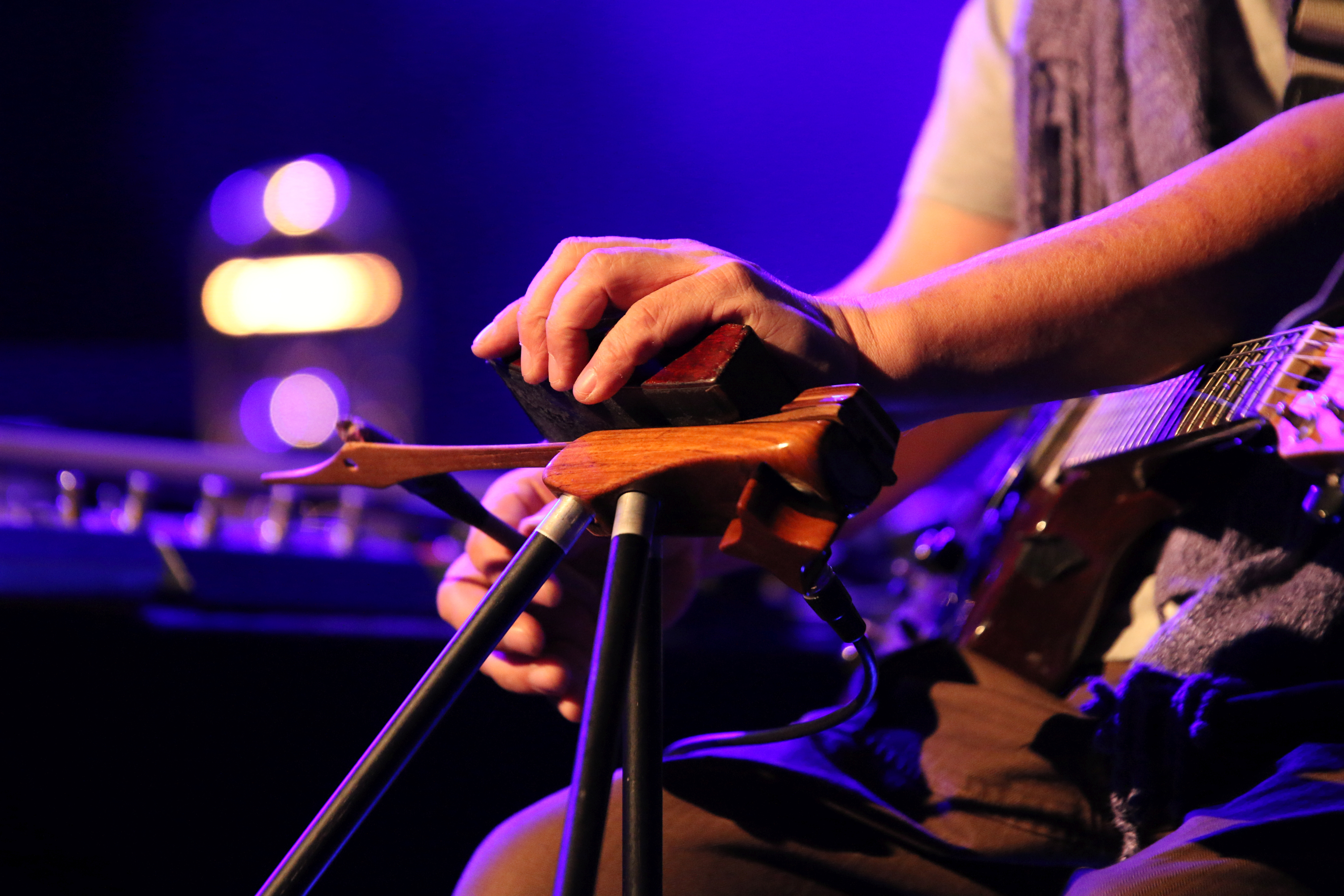
- Kazuhisa Uchihashi playing the daxophone at Deutsches Jazzfestival 2015
- Classification: Idiophone
- Hornbostel–Sachs classification: 132.1 (Friction idiophone with individual plaque (electric))
- Inventor: Hans Reichel
- Developed: 1980s
- Timbre: Animal-like, vocal

Related instruments
- Musical saw; Nail violin

Musicians
- Daxophonists

The daxophone, invented by Hans Reichel, is an electric wooden experimental musical instrument of the friction idiophones category.

== Etymology ==
The dax in daxophone is derived from the German word Dachs, meaning "badger" and referencing the many animal sounds that the daxophone is capable of generating, changed to dax so that the instrument name echoes Adolphe Sax's saxophone.

== History ==
The first usage of the daxophone in a musical work was the release of Hans Reichel's album The Dawn of Dachsman in 1987.

== Construction ==
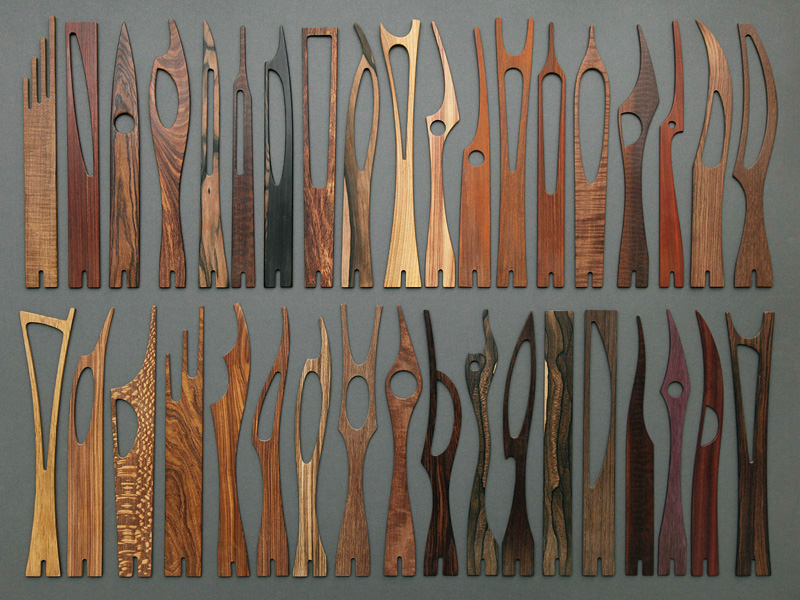
A variety of daxophone tongues

The daxophone consists of a wooden piece called a tongue, approximately 330 mm in length, 30 mm in width, and 5 mm in height, and fixed to a wooden block (often attached to a tripod, but also clamped to a table top), which holds one or more contact microphones. This wooden block has a cavity which is carved with a chisel for the insertion of two contact microphones, and a snakewood soundboard laid on top with the contact microphones glued to it. A wide range of voice-like timbres can be produced, depending on the shape of the tongue and the type of wood. The tongue shape is made with a coping saw, a scroll saw, or bandsaw. Denser woods such as ebony and oak produce a mellower sound than light woods. These sounds are notable for their comical, often human sounds.

Another vital part is the dax, sanded into a curved shape approximately 150 mm long and 50 mm tall, with a custom width tailored to the player's hands, and curved on both sides to allow for frictionless pitch changing. One side of the dax is fretted according to a random logarithmic succession, while the other is left unfretted and covered with a sheet of cardboard for a mellower sound and to preserve the surface. Two large fingerholes are drilled through the sides.

Reichel has documented the construction of the instrument in a way that a skilled woodworker could build their own. Plans are downloadable from his website, with a collection of proven shapes for the tongue delivered in the file format of a font, thus playing on Reichel's other profession as a typeface designer.

== Usage ==
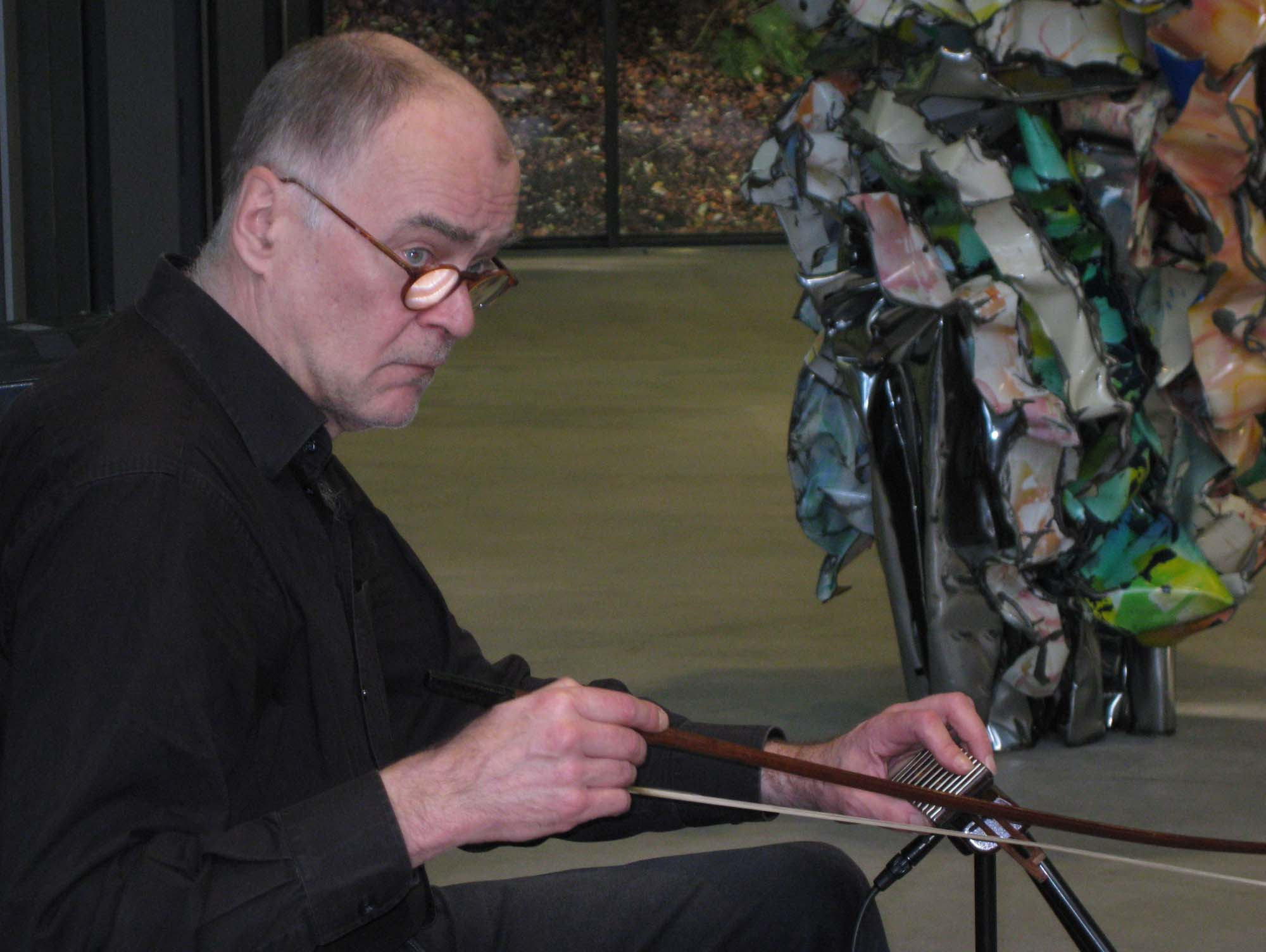
A daxophone being played by the inventor, Hans Reichel

Improvised daxophone performance by Korean artist Joyul

Normally, the daxophone is played by bowing the free end with a bow, most commonly a double bass bow, but it can also be struck or plucked, which propagates sound in the same way a ruler halfway off a table does. Vibrations then continue to the wooden-block base, which in turn is amplified by the contact microphone(s) therein. The timbre is adjusted by where it is bowed, and where along its length it is stopped with the dax. One side of the dax is fretted according to a randomly chosen logarithmic succession. The frequency interval between each fret in the succession will change due to the difference in pitch range between tongues, which is why the unfretted side is more frequently used for playing tonally in known compositions.

== Film scores ==
The 2022 horror film Smile features the daxophone as the lead instrument in its music score.

The 2024 supernatural mystery film The Watchers, directed by Ishana Night Shymalan and scored by Abel Korzeniowski, features daxophone on nearly every track of the score. It is the first time sections of daxophones have been used as an orchestral texture. The daxophones made for this film score were built by luthier John C.L. Jansen, and feature a new type of extended contrabass tongue, developed and built by the request of the composer.

The 2026 short film The Worm, directed by Tom Noakes and Scored by Callum O'Reilly features exclusively Daxophone and choir in the original score. The film premiered at the Sundance Film Festival.

== List of daxophonists and discography ==
- Daniel Fishkin
  - You're A Strong One
  - Dark Listening
- Michael Hearst (born 1972)
  - Michael Hearst Songs For Unusual Creatures (2012) (Urban Geek Records)
- Hans Reichel (1949–2011)
  - The Dawn of Dachsman (1987, FMP)
  - Shanghaied on Tor Road: The World's 1st Operetta Performed on Nothing but the Daxophone (1992, FMP CD 46)
  - Lower Lurum (1993/1994, Rastascan BRD 016)
  - Yuxo: A New Daxophone Operetta (2002, A/L/L 003)
- Mark Stewart
- Kazuhisa Uchihashi
  - King Pawns: Live in Berlin 2006 (with Hans Reichel, Innocentrecords ZEN-006)
  - Talking Daxophone (2018, Daxophone solo series, Innocentrecords icr-23)
  - Singing Daxophone (2021, Daxophone solo series 2, Innocentrecords icr-25)
- Oneohtrix Point Never (real name Daniel Lopatin)
  - Black Snow from Age Of (2018, Warp Records via Inertia Music)

== See also ==
- Musical saw
