= Guitar Solos 2 =

Studio album by various artists
- Released: 1976
- Recorded: December 1975 and January 1976
- Genre: Experimental; free improvisation
- Length: 48:05
- Label: Caroline (UK)
- Producer: Fred Frith

Guitar Solos series chronology
Guitar Solos (1974)	Guitar Solos 2 (1976)	Guitar Solos 3 (1979)

Guitar Solos 2 is the second in a series of three albums of improvised guitar solos by various musicians. It was released in the United Kingdom by Caroline Records in 1976, and consists of two guitar solos by Fred Frith, three by Derek Bailey, three by Hans Reichel and one by G. F. Fitzgerald. Frith coordinated and produced the series, which began with his 1974 debut solo album, Guitar Solos.

The two Frith tracks on this album were later included in the 1991 CD reissue of Frith's, Guitar Solos.

== Reception ==
Professional ratings
Review scores
Source	Rating
AllMusic	3/5 stars

In a review of Guitar Solos 2, and the next album in this series, Guitar Solos 3, Tony Coulter wrote that "[t]raditional guitar playing is most definitely not the focus of these two LPs." He called these compilations by Frith "an indispensable introduction to the world of freely improvising guitarists." Coulter added that these albums emphasize extended technique and showcase these guitarists at their best.

== Track listing ==
All tracks are written by the performer

Side one
No.	Title	Performer	Length
1.	"Water/Struggle/The North"	Fred Frith	11:05
2.	"Only Reflect"	Frith	4:00
3.	"Brixton Winter 1976"	G. F. Fitzgerald	9:40

Side two
No.	Title	Performer	Length
1.	"Avantlore"	Hans Reichel	3:05
2.	"Vain Yookts"	Reichel	3:00
3.	"Donnerkuhle"	Reichel	5:05
4.	"Virginal"	Derek Bailey	6:20
5.	"Praxis"	Bailey	4:00
6.	"The Lost Chord"	Bailey	1:50

== Personnel ==
- Fred Frith – guitar
- G. F. Fitzgerald – guitar
- Hans Reichel – guitar
- Derek Bailey – guitar
