= Karl Lippegaus =

German music journalist, author and radio presenter (born 1954)

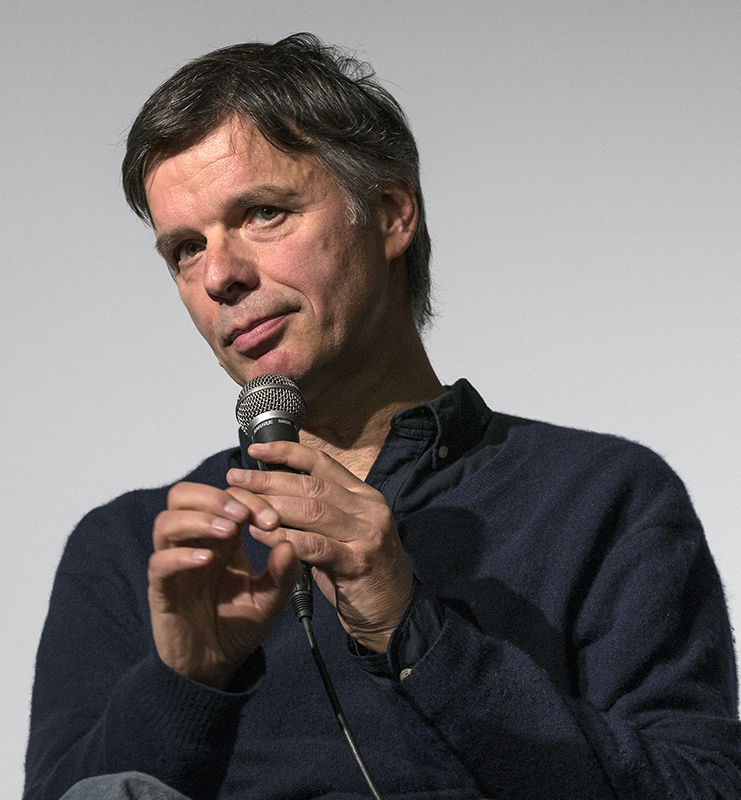
- Karl Lippegaus in Cologne on 7 December 2013
- Born: 28 October 1954; Cologne, Germany

Karl Lippegaus (born 28 October 1954 in Cologne) is a German music journalist, author and radio presenter.

== Life and career ==
Lippegaus studied German literature, musicology and philosophy at the universities of Bonn and Cologne after making his debut with a jazz broadcast on Miles Davis on Südwestfunk at the age of seventeen. Following an invitation by Dietrich Schulz-Köhn, he produced jazz and rock broadcasts at WDR since 1972.

He is the author of a biography on John Coltrane. Besides jazz Lippegaus also wrote about chanson, rock, folk music as well as on musical border areas, always with a particular interest into links between music and literature (Samuel Beckett, James Baldwin, Saul Bellow, Rolf Dieter Brinkmann, Alejo Carpentier, Julio Cortázar, Jack Kerouac, Dylan Thomas), film (Stanley Kubrick, Federico Fellini, Vincente Minnelli, Pier Paolo Pasolini, Jean-Luc Godard) and photography (Roy DeCarava, Guy Le Querrec, Hyou Vielz, William Claxton).

For many years, he presented the radio feature series 'Speakeasy' at WDR. He regularly produced weekly jazz features such as 'Border Music' for WDR 3 / WDR 5 (between 1995 and 2005), covering new areas of jazz, avant rock and world music, and 'Musikpassagen' (up to 2008). His series Musiker als DJ (English: "Musicians as DJ") featured guests such as Terry Riley, Annette Peacock, Robert Wyatt, Hans Reichel, Savina Yannatou, Evan Parker, Michael Riessler, Amélia Muge, Pascal Comelade, Gavin Bryars, Franz Koglmann, Rabih Abou-Khalil, and others.

At Deutschlandfunk he produced portraits about jazz musicians for the weekly program 'JazzFacts'.

In addition to his broadcasting activities from January 2016-2018, Lippegaus worked as an editor on jazz music for the music magazine Fono Forum.

In 1995, he received the first Deutsch-Französischer Journalistenpreis (DFJP) (aka Prix Franco-Allemand du Journalisme (PFAJ)) for a two-hour feature on migrants in the suburbs of Marseilles and Paris ("Rap, Rai, Ramadhan - arabische und westliche Kultur in Marseille und Paris").

He also works as translator, for example for the biography Michel Petrucciani – Leben gegen die Zeit (English: "Life against Time") and for Amazing Grace, a film by Sydney Pollack on Aretha Franklin (2019). For the WDR, he worked with director Hein Bruehl on the features Cry Baby Cry (1997), Bis die kalte Zeit uns frißt on Lotte Lenya and Kurt Weill (1998), Clowns, Clochards & Casanovas on Nino Rota (1999), Wolfsmond after a book by Julio Llamazares (2002) as well as on In meiner Einsamkeit des Südens - Der europäische Blick auf den Orient on the travel writer Isabelle Eberhardt and the Spanish author Juan Goytisolo (1997).

Lippegaus is the author of many episodes of the daily radio program ZeitZeichen and Kalenderblatt.

Lippegaus lives in Cologne and Southern France.

== Works ==
- John Coltrane, biography; Edel Germany, Hamburg 2011, ISBN 978-3-8419-0069-2
- Die Stille im Kopf – Interviews und Notizen über Musik, Ammann Verlag 1989; revised and expanded edition: Nieswand Verlag, Kiel 1991, 1994, ISBN 3-926048-47-6
- Ingo Wulff (editor): Diary Of Jazz – a perpetual calendar, Nieswand Verlag, Kiel 1996, ISBN 3-926048-38-7, (includes interviews by Karl Lippegaus: with Astor Piazzolla, Henri Texier, Geri Allen, Michel Portal, George Lewis, Lee Konitz, Don Pullen, Joshua Redman, Miles Davis, Gary Peacock, Bill Frisell und Paco de Lucia)
- Chapter Printer's Ink, Driftwood and Red in Peter Brötzmann Graphic Works 1959-2016, Wolke Verlag, Hohenheim 2016, ISBN 978-3-95593-075-2
- Chapter Colours, Densities, Forms: How ECM Changed Folk Music in Steve Lake and Paul Griffiths (editors) Horizons Touched – The Music of ECM Records, Granta Books 2007; ISBN 978-1-86207-880-2
- Chapter Rock-Jazz in Joachim Ernst Berendt (editor) »Die Story des Jazz«, Rowohlt (rororo) 1975, 1991, ISBN 3-499-17121-X
- Chapter No Wave in Klaus Frederking and Klaus Humann (editors) »Rock Session 7. Das Magazin der populären Musik. Thema: Schwarze Musik«, Rowohlt (rororo) 1983
- Chapter Zur Geschichte des Jazzrock in Burghard König (editor) »Jazzrock. Tendenzen einer modernen Musik«, Rowohlt (rororo) 1983

== See also ==
- Alan Bangs - ("Alan Bangs Connection" was an ambitious broadcasting series similar to Lippegaus' "Speakeasy" and "Border Music")
- Joachim-Ernst Berendt
