= Fred Frith Trio =

American experimental music and free improvising group

- Origin: Oakland, California, US
- Genres: Experimental music; free improvisation
- Years active: 2013–present
- Label: Intakt Records
- Members: Fred Frith; Jason Hoopes; Jordan Glenn

The Fred Frith Trio is a San Francisco Bay Area-based experimental music and free improvising group featuring Fred Frith, Jason Hoopes and Jordan Glenn. They were formed in Oakland, California in 2013, have released two studio albums and a live album on Intakt Records, and have toured widely across Europe in 2015, 2017, 2019 and 2022. The trio has also performed with guest musicians Susana Santos Silva and Lotte Anker, and visual artist Heike Liss.

Canadian music critic Raul da Gama described the Fred Frith Trio as "[t]hree extravagantly creative musicians employed in making music like we’ve never heard before". DownBeat magazine critic Peter Margasak said they are "a scrappy improvising trio" who deftly revisit many of Frith's musical endeavors in "a gritty, unified attack". Andy Robson wrote in the British monthly, Jazzwise that they "conjure improvised soundscapes that defy definition". Comparisons have been made to Massacre, but Robson said the Fred Frith Trio have a sound that is "beguilingly, more delicately sharing, more teasing and 'thinner'" than that of the New York City trio. Musician and educator Kevin Coultas wrote that the trio is one of Frith's "most superlative" bands since Henry Cow.

== Biography ==
The Fred Frith Trio comprises English guitarist Fred Frith, American bassist Jason Hoopes, and American drummer/percussionist Jordan Glenn. Frith was a founding member of the English avant-rock group Henry Cow, and from 1999 has been teaching musical improvisation at Mills College in Oakland, California. Hoopes and Glenn are members of the critically acclaimed experimental progressive song band Jack O' The Clock.

The Fred Frith Trio was formed in Oakland in 2013 and began playing at several local venues. The naming of the trio was "an accident", and had been suggested "as a joke" by guitarist Ava Mendoza, who had shared the bill with them at one of their early concerts. While Frith was not happy about being headlined, the promoters liked it and the name stuck. In February 2015 the trio toured Europe, performing in Croatia, Germany, Austria, Hungary, Italy, the Netherlands and Belgium. They toured Europe again in February 2017, performing in Norway, Austria, Turkey, France, Poland, Italy and Germany. In August 2018 the trio played in Brazil with jazz trumpeter Susana Santos Silva and performance artist Heike Liss, and in October 2019 with Santos Silva on the US East Coast and saxophonist Lotte Anker in Germany.

Frith said "When I proposed this trio I had nothing in mind beyond getting together with a couple of formidable musicians who I love and respect and seeing what would happen". It was not until after their first European tour that "some themes ... start[ed] emerging". Frith explained that he found himself drawing on his "earliest rock and roll experiences", and with Hoopes' "stunning ability to wring every-thing [sic] there is to be wrung out of an electric bass" and Glenn's "playful, irreverent, and absolute authority ... [a]nything can happen. Really. It's a bloody great feeling."

In January 2016 the trio recorded their debut album, Another Day in Fucking Paradise, which was released in June 2016. The album was generally well received by critics: Glenn Astarita described the album in All About Jazz as a "hardcore off-centered delicacy", while Chris Baber, writing in Jazz Views, called it "an exhilarating and explosive kicking against the doors of improvised music". The trio recorded their second studio album, Closer to the Ground in January 2018, which was released in September 2018. It was also generally well received, with Karl Lippegaus for the German radio station WDR 3 describing it as a tangle of "complex soundscapes", and DownBeat magazine music critic Peter Margasak writing that melodies surface occasionally, but the trio focuses on "exploring the nexus of groove and mood" without remaining in one place for too long. Their first live album, Road was recorded during their US East Coast and European tours in October 2019, and was released in October 2021. In a review of Road in the British monthly, Jazzwise, Daniel Spicer wrote: "It’s rare indeed that improvised music is simultaneously as accessible and cerebral as this."

== Discography ==
=== Studio albums ===
- Another Day in Fucking Paradise (2016, CD, Intakt Records)
- Closer to the Ground (2018, CD, Intakt Records)

=== Live albums ===
- Road (2021, 2xCD, Intakt Records) – with guests Susana Santos Silva and Lotte Anker

=== Other album appearances ===
- Fred Frith: All Is Always Now – Live at The Stone (2019, 3xCD, Intakt, Switzerland) – includes two Fred Frith Trio tracks

== Members ==
- Fred Frith – electric guitar, keyboards, voice
- Jason Hoopes – electric bass, double bass
- Jordan Glenn – drums, percussion
