= Stadthalle Köln =

Coordinates: 50°57′35.5″N 7°0′18.3″E

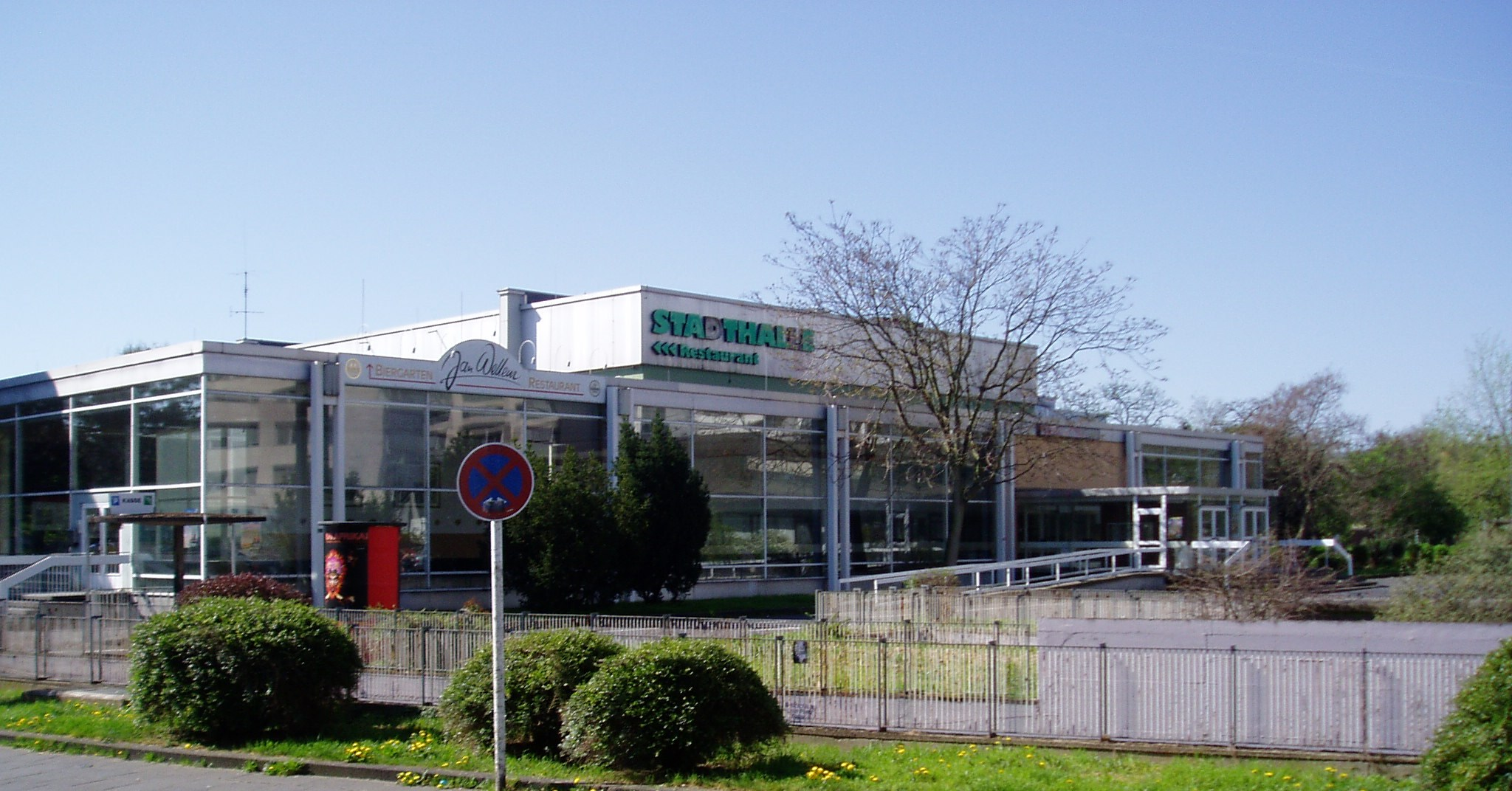
Stadthalle Köln-Mülheim

Stadthalle Köln is an event hall located in Cologne, Germany, which is primarily used for fairs and concerts. It was built in the 1960s and has a capacity of 1,450 standing or 1,053 seated. Notable past performers include Blue Öyster Cult, Whitesnake, King Crimson, Metallica, The Cure and Judas Priest.
