= Hans Reichel =

German guitarist and instrument maker (1949–2011)

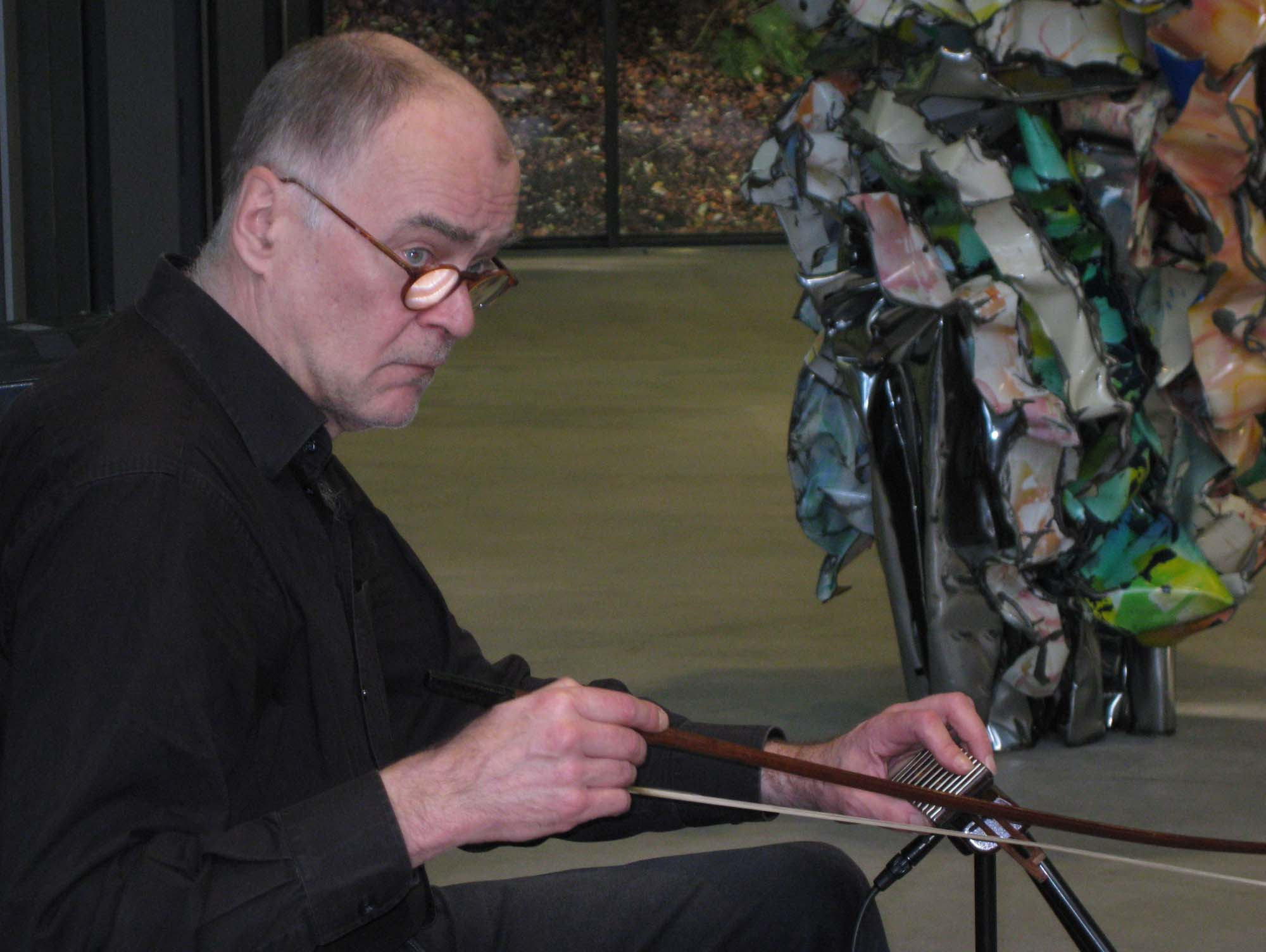
- Reichel in 2009 at a concert at KlangArt Festival in Tony Cragg's Skulpturenpark Waldfrieden at Wuppertal, Germany
- Born: 10 May 1949; Hagen, North Rhine-Westphalia, Allied-occupied Germany
- Died: 22 November 2011 (aged 62); Wuppertal, North Rhine-Westphalia, Germany

Hans Reichel (10 May 1949 – 22 November 2011) was a German improvisational guitarist, experimental luthier, inventor, and type designer.

== Career ==
Reichel was born in Hagen, Germany. He began to teach himself violin at age seven, playing in the school orchestra until age fifteen. Around the same time, he began to play guitar and became interested in The Beatles, The Rolling Stones, and later, Frank Zappa, Cream, and Jimi Hendrix.

He left music in the late 1960s to pursue font design and typesetting. He returned to music in the early 1970s, when he recorded a tape of guitar music. This recording was sent to the jury of the German Jazz Festival in Frankfurt, where he was asked to appear in a special concert for newcomers. Discussions with Jost Gebers, the founder of Free Music Production, led to the release on his debut album, Wichlinghauser Blues (FMP, 1973).

During the 1980s and 1990s, Reichel recorded solo albums and duets with Rüdiger Carl, Tom Cora, Eroc, Fred Frith, and Kazuhisa Uchihashi. He was featured in 'Crossing Bridges', a 1983 music programme based around jazz guitar improvisation, and broadcast by Channel 4 He was a member of the September Band with Paul Lovens, Rüdiger Carl, and Shelley Hirsch. He also worked with groups led by Thomas Borgmann and Butch Morris. The record labels Intakt, Rastascan, and Table of the Elements released some of Reichel's albums, compensating for the limited distribution of FMP.

In 1997, he was named one of the "30 Most Radical Guitarists" by Guitar Player magazine. He died at the age of 62 in Wuppertal, Germany.

== Invented instruments ==
Reichel constructed and built several variations of guitars and basses, most of them featuring multiple fretboards and unique positioning of pickups and 3rd bridges. The resulting sounds exceeded the range of conventional tuning and added unusual effects, from odd overtones to metallic noises, to his play.

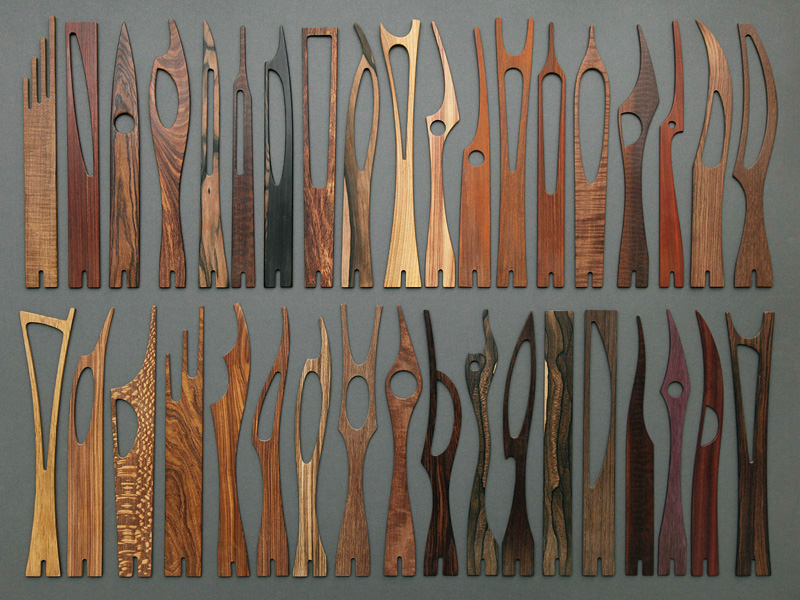
A variety of daxophone tongues

His most famous instrument is the daxophone, which consists of a single wooden blade fixed in a block containing a contact microphone, and it is played mostly with a bow and a block of fretted or unfretted wood known as the dax. While the bow vibrates the end of the wood, the dax is pressed down along the middle section of the wood, modulating the vibration and thus the noise. The wooden blade does not need to be a specific shape, and the instrument is notable for its throaty, almost human sounds.

== Partial discography ==
- Wichlinghauser Blues (1973, FMP 0150)
- Old Tune/Heimkehr der Holzböcke (1974, FMP S 5)
- Bonobo (1975, FMP 0280)
- Guitar Solos 2 (1976, Caroline Records C 1518. Three solos on compilation LP.)
- For Example (1976, FMP R123. Solo track on commemorative/compilation 3-LP set.)
- Erdmännchen (1977, FMP 0400. Duo with Achim Knispel.)
- Buben (1978, FMP 0530. Duo with Rüdiger Carl.)
- Sven-Åke Johansson mit dem NMUI im SO 36 '79 (1979, FMP S17)
- Sven-Åke Johansson mit dem NMUI im SO 36 '79 (1979, Olof Bright OBCD10/GROB650. Full version of concert previously released on FMP S17.)
- The Death of the Rare Bird Ymir (1979, FMP 0640/FMP CD 54)
- Bonobo Beach (1981, FMP 0830/FMP CD 54)
- Bergisch-Brandenburgisches Quartett (1982, Amiga 856031. With Johansson/Carl/Petrowsky.)
- Duet Improvisation (1985, Vand'Oeuvre 8501. With Keith Tippett.)
- Kino: studio opera with Eroc (1986, Teldec Import Service TIS 66.23921. Re-issued on CD in 1997.)
- The Dawn of Dachsman (1987, FMP CD 60)
- Coco Bolo Nights (1988, FMP CD 10)
- Angel Carver (1988, FMP CD 15. Duo with Tom Cora.)
- Live at the Knitting Factory, Volume One (1988/9, Enemy EMY111. One track in duo with Tom Cora.)
- Dix improvisations (1989, Victo CD 09. Two tracks on a compilation CD.)
- X-Communication (1990, FMP CD 33)
- Show-down (1990, Intakt CD 023. Duo with Wädi Gysi.)
- Stop complaining/Sundown (1990/1991, FMP CD 36. Duos with Fred Frith and Kazuhisa Uchihashi.)
- Mini-suite: [untitled] (1991, Rastascan BRD 010. One track on compilation CD.)
- Shanghaied on Tor Road: The World's 1st Operetta Performed on Nothing but the Daxophone (1992, FMP CD 46)
- Hans Reichel (1993, Table of the Elements Beryllium, 7" Vinyl)
- Variations on Jay (1993, Table of the Elements Oxygen, 7" Vinyl)
- AngelicA 93 (1993, CAICAI 004. Solo plus other combinations, including an appearance by the 'All Daxophone Band'.)
- Kumunguitar (1993, ¿What Next? WN0012. Duo with Jin Hi Kim.)
- Conduction 28/Conduction 31 (1993, New World Records 80484. Lawrence D. 'Butch' Morris.)
- Conduction 31/Conduction 35/Conduction 36 (1993, New World Records 80485. Lawrence D. 'Butch' Morris.)
- Lower Lurum (1993/1994, Rastascan BRD 016)
- Le bal (1994, Ellipsis Arts)
- Buben...plus (1994, FMP CD 78. New duos with Rüdiger Carl, released with older material.)
- The Vandoeuvre Concert (1994, FMP CD 72. As part of the September Band: Carl/Hirsch/Lovens/Reichel.)
- Looking at Flees with Henry Geldzahler (1994, FMP MJ 01. September Band one track on compilation.)
- Thomas Borgmann's Orkestra Kith 'n Kin (1995, Cadence Jazz Records CJR 1081.)
- Book/Virtual COWWS (1978–1996, FMP OWN90007/9. Various tracks on Rüdiger Carl compilation.)
- Hans Reichel/Rüdiger Carl (1997, Hurta Cordel 97)
- The Return of Onkel Boskop (1983/1997, Repertoire REP 4688-WY. Duo with Eroc.)
- King Pawns (1997, Zen-006. Duo with Kazuhisa Uchihashi.)
- Festival Beyond Innocence: 2 1997–1998 (1997, Innocent Records FBI 103. Two solos + trio track on compilation CD.)
- Cue sheets II (2000, Tzadik 7513. Steve Beresford; one track features Reichel.)
- Total Music Meeting 2001: Audiology — 11 groups live in Berlin (2001, A/L/L 002. One track by Manuela on this compilation CD.)
- Yuxo: A New Daxophone Operetta (2002, A/L/L 003)
- Self Made (2009, AM 192. Duo with Ganesh Anandan.)

== Typefaces ==
Hans Reichel designed a few typefaces, among them one of today's most popular type designs in advertising and in marketing (FF Dax).

- 1983 Barmeno BQ
- 1995-2000 FF Dax
- 1996 FF Schmalhans
- 1999 FF Sari
- 2001 FF Routes
- 2004 FF Dax Compact
- 2005 FF Daxline
- 2001 FF Anuel
