= Fred Frith discography =

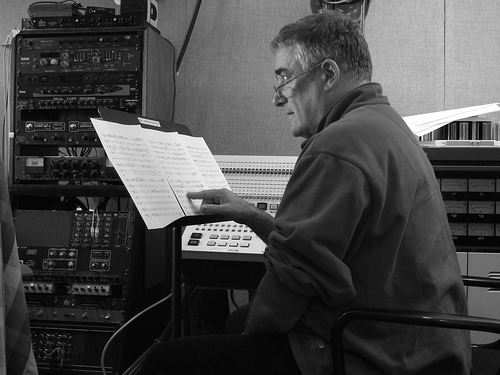
Fred Frith at a piano recording session at New, Improved Recording in Oakland, California, September 2006.

Fred Frith appears on over 600 recordings. This is a selection from bands he was/is a member of, collaborations with other bands and musicians, and his solo recordings. The year indicates when the album was first released. For a comprehensive discography, see the Discography of Fred Frith by Michel Ramond, Patrice Roussel and Stephane Vuilleumier.

== Studio albums ==
- Guitar Solos (1974, LP, Caroline, UK)
- Gravity (1980, LP, Ralph, US)
- Speechless (1981, LP, Ralph, US)
- Cheap at Half the Price (1983, LP, Ralph, US)
- Quartets (1994, CD, RecRec, Switzerland)
- Clearing (2001, CD, Tzadik, US)
- Prints: Snapshots, Postcards, Messages and Miniatures, 1987–2001 (2002, CD, Fred, UK)
- Eleventh Hour (2005, 2xCD, Winter & Winter, Germany)
- To Sail, to Sail (2008, CD, Tzadik, US)
- Clearing Customs (2011, CD, Intakt, Switzerland)
- Guitar Solos / Fifty (2024, 2xLP, Week-End Records, Germany)

=== Music for Dance ===
- The Technology of Tears (And Other Music for Dance and Theatre) (1988, 2xLP, RecRec, Switzerland)
- Allies (Music for Dance Volume 2) (1996, CD, RecRec, Switzerland)
- The Previous Evening (Music for Dance Volume 4) (1997, CD, Recommended, UK) (Note: The Previous Evening was designated "Music for Dance Volume 4" after Accidental was released.)
- Accidental (Music for Dance Volume 3) (2002, CD, Fred, UK)
- The Happy End Problem (Music for Dance Volume 5) (2006, CD, Fred, UK)
- Nowhere, Sideshow, Thin Air (Music for Dance Volume 6) (2009, CD, Fred, UK)
- Field Days (The Amanda Loops) (2015, CD, Fred, UK)
- Propaganda (2015, CD, Fred, UK)

=== Music for Film ===
- The Top of His Head (1989, LP, Crammed, Belgium) – original soundtrack to the film The Top of His Head by Peter Mettler
- Step Across the Border (1990, 2xLP, RecRec, Switzerland) – original soundtrack to the film Step Across the Border by Nicolas Humbert and Werner Penzel
- Middle of the Moment (1995, CD, RecRec, Switzerland) – original soundtrack to the film Middle of the Moment by Nicolas Humbert and Werner Penzel
- Eye to Ear (1997, CD, Tzadik, US) – collection of film and theatre music
- Rivers and Tides (2003, CD, Winter & Winter, Germany) – original soundtrack to the film Rivers and Tides by Thomas Riedelsheimer
- Eye to Ear II (2004, CD, Tzadik, US) – music from Gambling, Gods and LSD by Peter Mettler, Returning Home by Andy Abrahams Wilson, Hirschen Mit Goldenen Hufen by Petra Mäussnest, and Sideshow by Kristin Varner
- Eye to Ear III (2010, CD, Tzadik, US) – music from Drei Gegen Troja by Hussi Kutulcan, and Thirst by Deborah Kauffman and Alan Snitow

=== Composer only ===
- Pacifica (1998, CD, Tzadik, US)
- Freedom in Fragments (2002, CD, Tzadik, US)
- Back to Life (2008, CD, Tzadik, US)

== Live albums ==
- Live in Japan (1982, 2xLP, Recommended, Japan)
- Stone, Brick, Glass, Wood, Wire (Graphic Scores 1986–1996) (1999, CD, I Dischi di Angelica, Italy)
- Impur II (2009, CD, Fred, UK)
- Storytelling (2017, CD, Intuition, Germany)
- All Is Always Now – Live at The Stone (2019, 3xCD, Intakt, Switzerland)
- Woodwork (2019, CD, Klanggalerie, Austria)

=== Composer only ===
- Impur (2006, CD, Fred, UK)

== Singles ==
- "Dancing in the Street" / "What a Dilemma" (1980, 7", Ralph, US) – from Gravity

== Box sets ==
- Fred and Ralph (1991, 3xCD, RecRec, Switzerland) – Fred Frith releases by Ralph Records
  - Gravity (1980, CD, Ralph)
  - Speechless (1981, CD, Ralph)
  - Cheap at Half the Price (1983, CD, Ralph)
- The Fred Records Story 2001–2020 Volume 1: Rocking the Boat (2021, 9xCD, Fred, UK)
  - Guitar Solos (2002, CD, Fred)
  - Gravity (2002, CD, Fred)
  - Cheap at Half the Price (2004, CD, Fred)
  - Killing Time (2005, CD, Fred)
  - Impur (2006, CD, Fred)
  - Middle of the Moment (2004, CD, Fred)
  - That House We Lived In (2003, 2xCD, Fred)
  - Dropera (1991, CD, RecRec) – bonus CD
- The Fred Records Story 2001–2020 Volume 2: Crossing Borders (2021, 9xCD, Fred, UK)
  - Live in Japan (2010, CD, Fred)
  - Speechless (2003, CD, Fred)
  - Prints (2002, CD, Fred)
  - Step Across the Border (2003, CD, Fred)
  - Impur II (2009, CD, Fred)
  - The Art of Memory II (2008, CD, Fred)
  - Learn to Talk / Country of Blinds (2005, 2xCD, Fred)
  - Helter Skelter (1992, CD, RecRec) – bonus CD (remastered)
- The Fred Records Story 2001–2020 Volume 3: Stepping Out (2021, 10xCD, Fred, UK)
  - The Technology of Tears (2008, CD, Fred)
  - Propaganda (2015, CD, Fred)
  - Allies (2004, CD, Fred)
  - Accidental (2002, CD, Fred)
  - The Previous Evening (1997, CD, Recommended)
  - The Happy End Problem (2006, CD, Fred)
  - Nowhere, Sideshow, Thin Air (2009, CD, Fred)
  - Field Days (The Amanda Loops) (2015, CD, Fred)
  - Inimitable – Debates for Ganden [with Amanda Miller] (2020, CD, Fred) – bonus CD (previously unreleased)
  - Live in Tel Aviv and Aubervilliers [with Tom Cora and Chris Cutler] (2020, CD, Fred) – bonus CD (previously unreleased)

== Collaborations ==
With Bruce Ackley, Henry Kaiser and Aram Shelton

- Unexpected Twins (2019, CD, Relative Pitch Records, US)

With Noël Akchoté

- Réel (1996, 10" LP, Rectangle, France)

With Núria Andorrà

- Dancing Like Dust (2023, CD, Klanggalerie, Austria)

With Lotte Anker

- Edge of the Light (2014, CD, Intakt, Switzerland)

With ARTE Quartett

- Still Urban (2009, CD, Intakt, Switzerland)
- The Big Picture (2009, CD, Intakt, Switzerland)

With Derek Bailey and Antoine Berthiaume

- Soshin (2003, CD, Ambiances Magnétiques, Canada)

With Derek Bailey, Sonny Sharrock, John Zorn, Bill Laswell and Charles K. Noyes

- Improvised Music 1981 (1992, CD, MuWorks, US)

With Anne Bourne and John Oswald

- Dearness (2002, CD, Spool, Canada)

With Anthony Braxton

- Duo (Victoriaville) 2005 (2006, CD, Les Disques Victo, Canada)

With Chris Brown

- Cutter Heads (2007, CD, Intakt, Switzerland)

With Shelley Burgon

- The Life and Behavior (2025, CD, Relative Pitch Records, US)

With John Butcher

- The Natural Order (2014, CD, Northern Spy, US)

With John Butcher and Theresa Wong

- Quintillions Green (2016, FLAC, Otoroku, UK)

With Lindsay Cooper, Lars Hollmer and Gianni Gebbia

- Angels on the Edge of Time (2015, CD, I Dischi di Angelica, Italy)

With Lol Coxhill

- French Gigs (1983, LP, AAA, France)

With Chris Cutler

- Live in Prague and Washington (1983, LP, Recommended, UK) – 1990 CD release retitled Live in Moscow, Prague & Washington
- Live in Trondheim, Berlin & Limoges, Vol. 2 (1994, CD, Recommended, UK)
- 2 Gentlemen in Verona (2000, CD, Recommended, UK)
- The Stone: Issue Two (2007, CD, Tzadik, US)

With Chris Cutler and Tom Cora

- Live in Tel Aviv and Aubervilliers (2021, CD, Fred, UK) (Note: A limited edition bonus CD included in the Fred Records Story box set.)

With Chris Cutler and Thomas Dimuzio

- Golden State (2010, LP, Recommended, UK) (Note: Golden State is an LP-only release; "a CD just wouldn't be the same, sonically, visually or ontologically." – Chris Cutler.)

With Lesli Dalaba, Eric Glick Rieman and Carla Kihlstedt

- Dalaba Frith Glick Rieman Kihlstedt (2003, CD, Accretions, US)

With Totsuzen Danball

- Live at Loft Shinjuku Tokyo Japan 23.July'81 (1982, CT, Floor, Japan)

With Jean Derome, Pierre Tanguay and Myles Boisen

- All Is Bright, But It Is Not Day (2002, CD, Ambiances Magnétiques, Canada)

With Michel Doneda

- Fred Frith Michel Doneda (2014, CD, Vand'OEuvre, France)

With Mark Dresser and Ikue Mori

- Later... (2000, CD, Les Disques Victo, Canada)

With Jean-Pierre Drouet

- En Public aux Laboratoires d'Aubervilliers (1997, CD, Transes Europeennes, France)

With Jean-Pierre Drouet and Louis Sclavis

- I Dream of You Jumping (2001, CD, Les Disques Victo, Canada)
- Contretemps etc... (2011, CD, In Situ, France)

With Ensemble Modern

- Traffic Continues (2000, CD, Winter & Winter, Germany)

With Ensemble Musiques Nouvelles

- Something About This Landscape for Ensemble (2023, LP, Sub Rosa, Belgium)

With Anil Eraslan, Tom Malmendier and Clara Weil

- There or Here and That (2020, CD, Eux Sæm, France)

With Janet Feder

- Ironic Universe (2006, CD+DVD, Recommended, US)

With Hardy Fox

- A Day Hanging Dead Between Heaven and Earth (2018, CD, Klanggalerie, Austria)

With Evelyn Glennie

- The Sugar Factory (2007, CD, Tzadik, US)

With the Gravity Band

- Fred Frith and the Gravity Band (2025, CD, Klanggalerie, Austria)

With Barry Guy

- Backscatter Bright Blue (2014, CD, Intakt, Switzerland)

With Tim Hodgkinson

- Live Improvisations (1992, CD, Woof, UK)

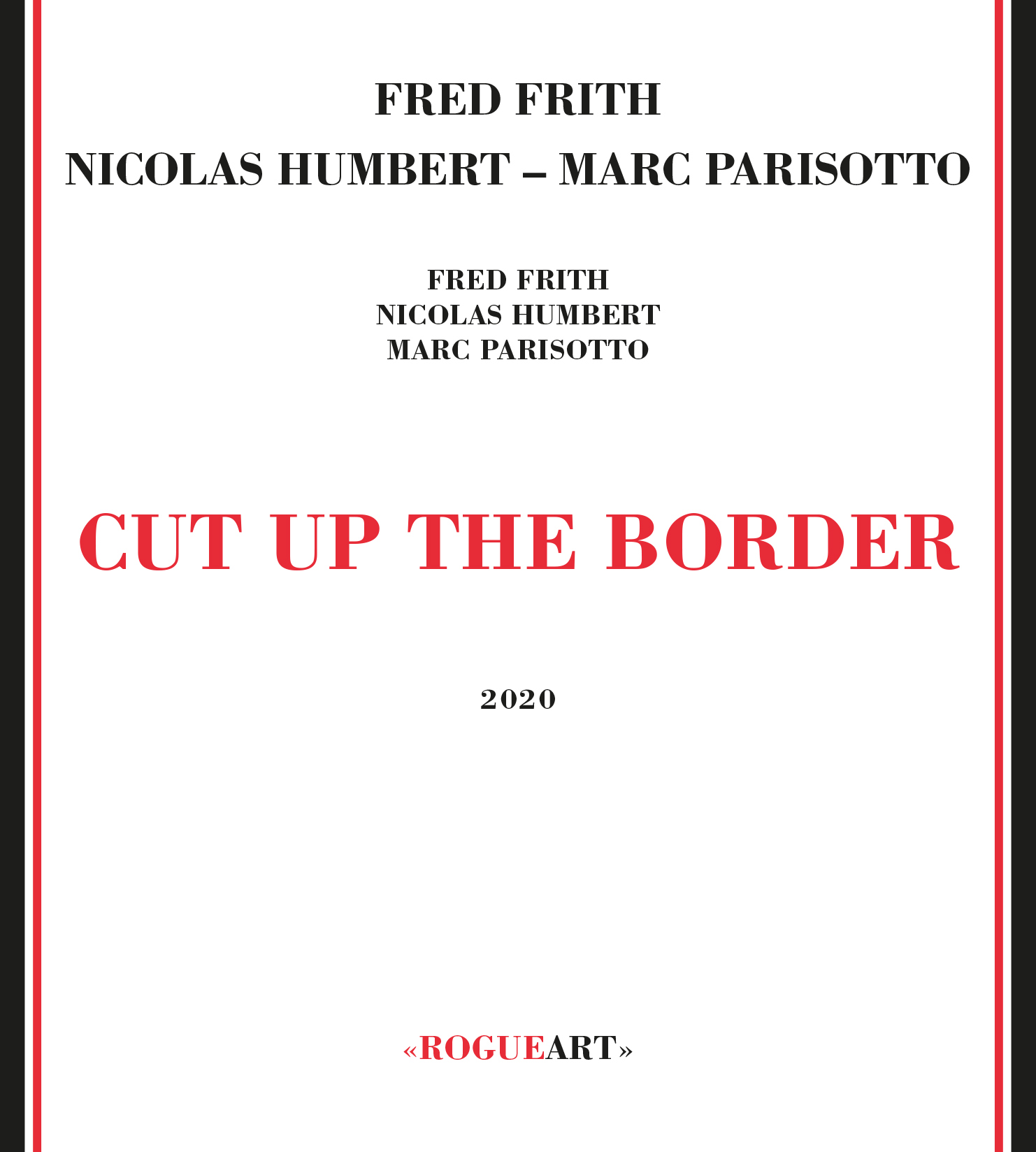
Cut Up the Border by Fred Frith, Nicolas Humbert and Marc Parisotto

With Percy Howard, Charles Hayward and Bill Laswell

- Meridiem (1998, CD, Materiali Sonori, Italy)

With Nicolas Humbert and Marc Parisotto

- Cut Up the Border (2020, CD, RogueArt, France)

With Darren Johnston

- Everybody's Somebody's Nobody (2016, CD, Clean Feed, Portugal)

With Darren Johnston Devin Hoff, Larry Ochs and Ches Smith

- Reasons for Moving (2007, CD, Not Two, US)

With Henry Kaiser

- With Friends Like These (1979, LP, Metalanguage, US)
- Who Needs Enemies? (1983, LP, Metalanguage, US)
- With Enemies Like These, Who Needs Friends? (1987, CD, SST, US)
- Friends & Enemies (1999, 2xCD, Cuneiform, US)

With Carla Kihlstedt and Stevie Wishart

- The Compass, Log and Lead (2006, CD, Intakt, Switzerland)

With Hans Koch

- You are Here (2017, CD, Intakt, Switzerland)

With Cornelius Claudio Kreusch and Johannes Tonio Kreusch

- Pink Neon (2026, 2xCD and 2xLP, Galileo Music Communication, Germany/Spain)

With Joëlle Léandre and Jonathan Segel

- Tempted to Smile (2003, CD, Spool, Canada)

With Annie Lewandowski

- Long as in Short, Walk as in Run (2011, CD, Ninth World)

With René Lussier

- Nous Autres (1987, LP, Les Disques Victo, Canada)

With Amanda Miller

- Inimitable – Debates for Ganden (2021, CD, Fred, UK)

With Helen Mirra

- Kwangsi Quail (2015, LP, Shhpuma, Portugal)

With Macio Moretti

- Works for Me Should Be the Title (2023, LP, Don't Sit On My Vinyl! / Muzyka z Mózgu, Poland)

With Ikue Mori

- A Mountain Doesn't Know It's Tall (2021, CD, Intakt, Switzerland)

With Mózg Injectors

- Sylvan Trail (2019, 12" LP and CD, Mózg, Poland)

With Bob Ostertag and Phil Minton

- Voice of America (1982, LP, Rift, US)

With Bob Ostertag and John Zorn

- Attention Span (1990, CD, RecRec, Switzerland)

With Evan Parker

- Hello, I Must Be Going (2015, CD, Les Disques Victo, Canada)

With Francois-Michel Pesenti

- Helter Skelter (1992, CD, RecRec, Switzerland)

With Mariá Portugal

- Matter (2025, CD, Intakt, Switzerland)

With Marc Ribot

- Subsonic 1. Sounds of a Distant Episode (1994, CD, Sub Rosa/Subsonic, Belgium)

With Ferdinand Richard (as Fred & Ferd)

- Dropera (1991, LP, RecRec, Switzerland)

With Danielle Roger

- Pas de Deux (2008, CD, Ambiances Magnétiques, Canada)

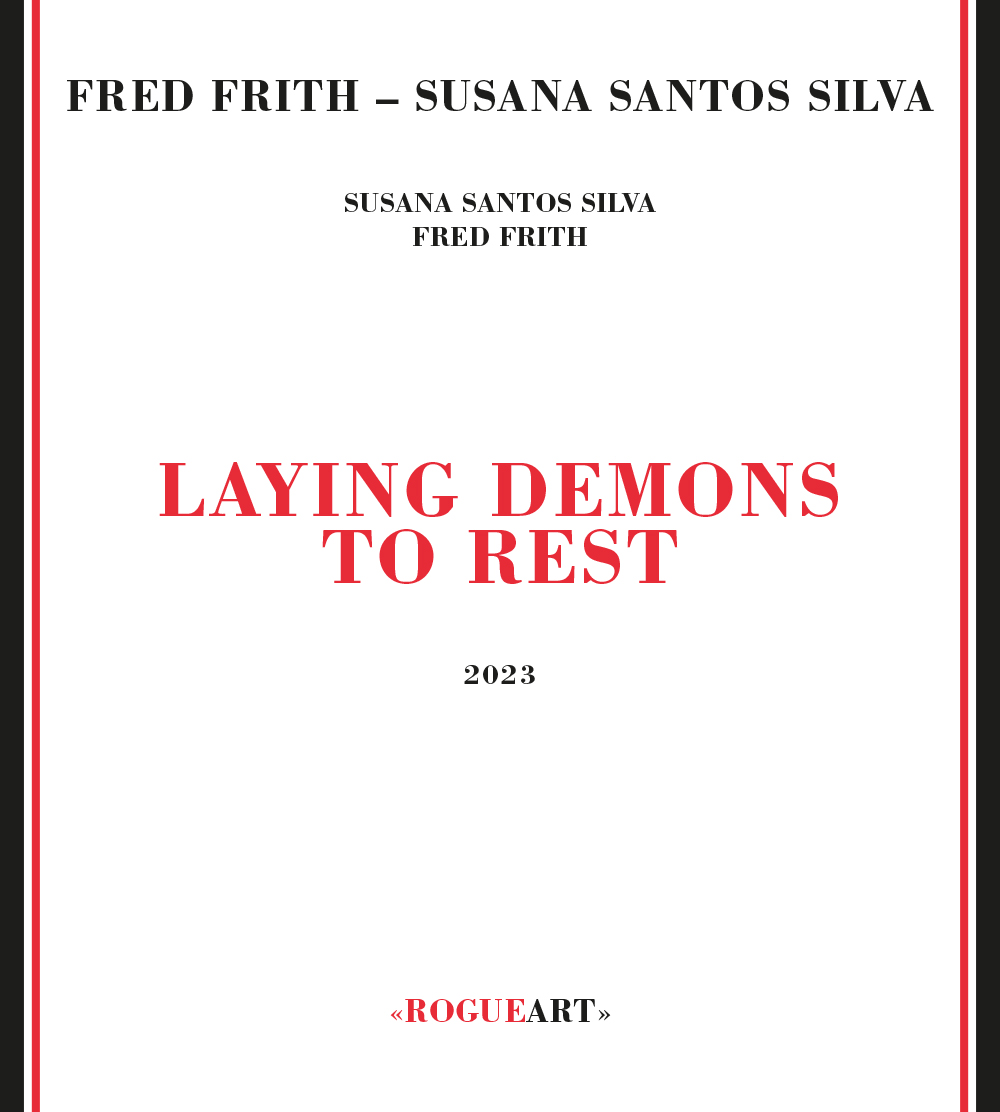
Laying Demons to Rest by Fred Frith and Susana Santos Silva

With Rusconi

- Live In Europe (2016, CD, Qilin, Germany)

With Susana Santos Silva

- Laying Demons to Rest (2023, CD, RogueArt, France)

With Katrin Scholl, Daniel Erismann, Lucas N. Niggli, Hans Koch and Peter Kowald

- Nil (1995, CD, Unit Records, Switzerland)

With Sonargemeinschaft (Sonar Community)

- Drift (2008, CD, Poise, Germany)

With Karen Stackpole

- Nature (2026, CD, Sub Rosa)

With Studio Dan

- Rocket Science #1 #5 #8 (2021, CD, ROS, Germany)

With Sudhu Tewari and Cenk Ergün

- Lock Me Up, Lock Me Down (2020, Digital, Carrier Records, US)

With Sudhu Tewari (as Normal)

- Moving Parts (2023, CD, Fo'c'sle Records, US)

With Toychestra

- What Leave Behind (2004, CD, S.K., France)

With Benjamin Vergara

- Fanfarrisimo (2019, LP, Tour De Bras, Canada)

With Katharina Weber and Fredy Studer

- It Rolls (2015, CD, Intakt, Switzerland)

With Michel Wintsch, Franziska Baumann and Bernard Trontin

- Whisperings (2002, CD, RecRec, Switzerland)

With John Zorn

- The Art of Memory (1994, CD, Incus, UK)
- 50th Birthday Celebration Volume Five (2004, CD, Tzadik, US)
- The Art of Memory II (2008, CD, Fred, UK)
- Late Works (2010, CD, Tzadik, US)

With John Zorn, Onnyk and Toyozumi Yoshisaburo

- Ars Longa Dens Brevis (2000, CD, Allelopathy, Japan)

== Bands ==
Henry Cow

- Legend (1973, LP, Virgin, UK)
- Unrest (1974, LP, Virgin, UK)
- Concerts (1976, 2xLP, Caroline, UK)
- Western Culture (1979, LP, Broadcast, UK)
- The Virgin Years – Souvenir Box (1991, 3xCD, East Side Digital, US)
- Henry Cow Box (2006, 7xCD, Recommended, UK)
- Stockholm & Göteborg (2008, CD, Recommended, UK)
- The 40th Anniversary Henry Cow Box Set (2009, 9xCD+DVD, Recommended, UK)
- The Henry Cow Box Redux: The Complete Henry Cow (2019, 17xCD+DVD, Recommended, UK)

Henry Cow / Slapp Happy

- Desperate Straights (1975, LP, Virgin, UK)
- In Praise of Learning (1975, LP, Virgin, UK)

Art Bears

- Hopes and Fears (1978, LP, Recommended, UK)
- Winter Songs (1979, LP, Recommended, UK)
- The World as It Is Today (1981, LP, Recommended, UK)
- The Art Box (2004, 6xCD, Recommended, UK)

Aksak Maboul

- Un Peu de l'Âme des Bandits (1980, LP, Crammed, Belgium)

Material

- Memory Serves (1981, LP, Celluloid, France)
- One Down (1982, LP, Celluloid, France)
- Live from Soundscape (1994, CD, DIW, Japan)

Massacre

- Killing Time (1981, LP, Celluloid, France)
- Funny Valentine (1998, CD, Tzadik, US)
- Meltdown (2001, CD, Tzadik, US)
- Lonely Heart (2007, CD, Tzadik, US)
- Love Me Tender (2013, CD, Tzadik, US)

Skeleton Crew

- Learn to Talk (1984, LP, Rift, US / Recommended, Europe)
- The Country of Blinds (1986, LP, Rift, US / Recommended, Europe)
- Learn to Talk / Country of Blinds (1990, CD, RecRec, Switzerland)
- Etymology (1997, CD-ROM, Rarefaction, US)
- Free Dirt (Live) (2021, 2xCD, Klanggalerie, Austria)

Duck and Cover

- Rē Records Quarterly, Vol. 1 No. 2 (1985, LP, Recommended, UK)

French Frith Kaiser Thompson

- Live, Love, Larf & Loaf (1987, LP, Rhino, US)
- Invisible Means (1990, LP, Demon, UK, Windham Hill, US)

Naked City

- Naked City (1990, LP, Elektra/Nonesuch, US)
- Torture Garden (1990, LP, Elektra/Nonesuch, US)
- Heretic, Jeux des Dames Cruelles (1992, CD, Avant, Japan)
- Grand Guignol (1992, CD, Avant, Japan)
- Leng Tch'e (1992, CD, Toy's Factory, Japan)
- Radio (1993, CD, Avant, Japan)
- Absinthe (1993, CD, Avant, Japan)
- Naked City Live, Vol. 1: The Knitting Factory 1989 (2002, CD, Tzadik, US)

Death Ambient

- Death Ambient (1995, CD, Tzadik, US)
- Synaesthesia (1999, CD, Tzadik, US)
- Drunken Forest (2007, CD, Tzadik, US)

Fred Frith Guitar Quartet

- Ayaya Moses (1997, CD, Ambiances Magnétiques, Canada)
- Upbeat (1999, CD, Ambiances Magnétiques, Canada)

Maybe Monday

- Saturn's Finger (1999, CD, Buzz, Netherlands)
- Digital Wildlife (2002, CD, Winter & Winter, Germany)
- Unsquare (2008, CD, Intakt, Switzerland)

Keep the Dog

- That House We Lived In (2003, 2xCD, Fred, UK)

The Orckestra

- "Unreleased Orckestra Extract" (3" CD single, 2006, Recommended, UK)

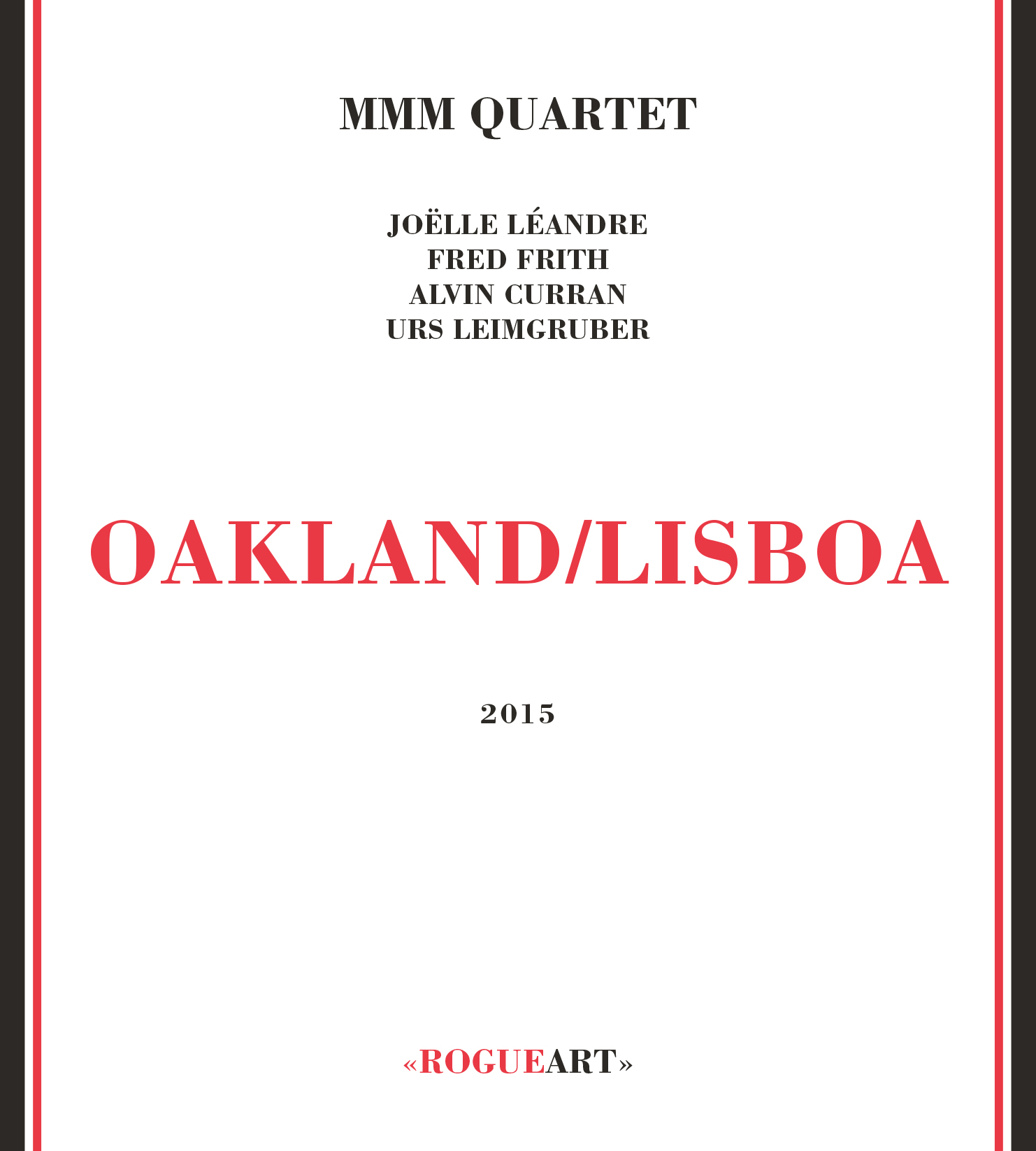
Oakland/Lisboa by MMM Quartet

Cosa Brava

- Ragged Atlas (2010, CD, Intakt, Switzerland)
- The Letter (2012, CD, Intakt, Switzerland)
- Z Sides (2024, CD, Klanggalerie, Austria)

MMM Quartet (Note: MMM stands for "MillsMusicMafia", with reference to Mills College where Leandre, Frith and Curran teach music.)

- Live at the Metz' Arsenal (2012, CD, Leo, UK)
- Oakland/Lisboa (2015, CD, RogueArt, France)

Fred Frith Trio

- Another Day in Fucking Paradise (2016, CD, Intakt, Switzerland)
- Closer to the Ground (2018, CD, Intakt, Switzerland)
- Road (2021, 2xCD, Intakt Records, Switzerland)

Lantskap Logic

- Lantskap Logic (2018, CD, Clean Feed, Portugal)
- Hidden Danger Lets Me In (2023, CD, Clean Feed, Portugal)

Henry Now

- Then Again (2025, Dark Companion)
