= That House We Lived In =

Live album by Keep the Dog
- Released: August 19, 2003
- Recorded: 1991
- Venue: Austria, Italy, Germany
- Genre: Avant-rock
- Length: 96:17
- Label: Fred (UK)
- Producer: Fred Frith

That House We Lived In is a double live album by American experimental rock band Keep the Dog. It comprises material from their final European tour in 1991 and was released by Fred Frith on Fred Records in 2003.

== Background ==
Keep the Dog (1989–1991) was Fred Frith's review band that performed a collection of his compositions live in Europe, North America and the former Soviet Union. With each performances, the band became more open with the material they played, and by their final 1991 European tour, the group had rearranged many of Frith's pieces, and added improvised segments.

Material for this album comes from DAT recordings of the band's final performances in Austria, Germany, and Italy in May and June 1991. Frith only considered releasing an album of their work in 2002 when Jon Leidecker spotted the tapes in Frith's office and volunteered to assemble a montage for review. Frith arranged the tracks on the two CDs to "... re-create the feeling of a typical two-set concert while including as much of our repertoire as possible within the time constraints of the format." While the pieces represented a typical concert, they were selected from nine different performances on their final tour.

== Content ==
The tracks on That House We Lived In are primarily Frith compositions from about a dozen of his solo, group and project albums. All are free interpretations by the band of the originals, often leading to improvisation. These include "pop" tunes like "Some Clouds Do" from Cheap at Half the Price, "dance" numbers like "Rock and a Hard Place" from Allies, "Hola, On Danse!" from the rock opera, Dropera, and two of Frith's "classics": "Norrgården Nyvla" from Gravity, and "Domaine de Langendreer" (originally "Domaine de Planousset") from Speechless. Two versions of Massacre's "Bones" are here: a take on the original, and a slow number rendering it barely recognisable as "Bones". A few of the tracks are entirely improvised and do not appear elsewhere, like "Revelation" and "That Home We Lived In".

That House We Lived In is largely an instrumental album with the occasional vocal utterances from members of the group, and Frith singing the refrain "some clouds do, some clouds don't" on "Some Clouds Do".

== Reception ==
Professional ratings
Review scores
Source	Rating
AllMusic	4/5 stars
Clouds and Clocks	favorable

In a review of That House We Lived In at AllMusic, François Couture wrote that the album is "a must" for enthusiasts of Frith's "livelier, more vivacious writing". He remarked that the "fun" the band must have been having is "highly communicative", and that Ostertag's inclusion with "the strangest sounds and ambiences" coming from his sampler, "is the [group's] wild card". Couture's track highlights included the "lively" "Hola, On Danse!", the "darker" "Propaganda Suite", the "mad rendition" of "Some Clouds Do", and the "beautiful" "Norrgården Nyvla".

Writing at Clouds and Clocks, Beppe Colli said that Keep the Dog plays Frith's material "with a freshness, assurance and creativity" that demonstrates how well the sextet work together. He praised the band's repertoire, adding that "[t]ime has been kind to these melodies and arrangements, which now sound 'classic'". He spoke highly of Derome, Lussier and Parkins, but questioned Hayward's "limpid rhythm framework", and said Ostertag's sampler is "indispensable but not always easy to hear". Colli also questioned Frith's statement in the liner notes that he wanted to include as much as he could of the band's set "within the time constraints of the format" when another hour of music could have been accommodated on the double-CD.

== Track listing ==
All tracks are written by Fred Frith, except where noted (Note: "Foot in Hole" is credited to Fred Frith, whereas on The Country of Blinds, the song is credited to Skeleton Crew (Fred Frith, Tom Cora and Zeena Parkins).)

Disc 1
No.	Title	Length
1.	"Revelation" (Jean Derome) / "Bones" (Frith, Bill Laswell, Fred Maher)	4:59
2.	"Rock and a Hard Place"	5:45
3.	"Hola, On Danse!" (Frith, Ferdinand Richard)	2:20
4.	"Foot in Hole"	7:38
5.	"Fanfare" / "Lizard's Tail"	4:31
6.	"Suspended"	2:02
7.	"Quick Sign"	5:16
8.	"Propaganda Suite"	8:37
9.	"Walking Song"	5:32
10.	"Some Clouds Do"	2:57

Disc 2
No.	Title	Length
1.	"The Same Eye" / "Fives"	5:37
2.	"No Legs" / "Slow Bones"	7:13
3.	"That Home We Lived In" (Keep the Dog) / "Candy Machine"	3:24
4.	"The Trace" (Frith, Henry Kaiser)	5:18
5.	"True Love" (instrumental version)	4:01
6.	"Instant Party"	3:07
7.	"Small Mercy II"	3:34
8.	"Norrgården Nyvla"	3:13
9.	"Year of the Monkey" / "Dark as a Match"	6:21
10.	"Domaine de Langendreer"	4:52

== Original recordings ==
Most of the above tracks were adapted from original recordings by Fred Frith that appeared on the following albums:

- Gravity (1980) by Fred Frith: "Norrgården Nyvla", "Year of the Monkey"
- Killing Time (1981) by Massacre: "Bones", "No Legs", "Slow Bones"
- Speechless (1981) by Fred Frith: "Domaine de Langendreer"
- Who Needs Enemies? (1983) by Fred Frith and Henry Kaiser: "The Trace"
- Cheap at Half the Price (1983) by Fred Frith: "Walking Song", "Some Clouds Do", "Instant Party"
- The Country of Blinds (1986) by Skeleton Crew: "Foot in Hole"
- The 20th Anniversary of the Summer of Love (1987) by various artists: "True Love"
- The Technology of Tears (1988) by Fred Frith: "Propaganda Suite"
- Step Across the Border (1990) by Fred Frith: "Candy Machine"
- Invisible Means (1990) by French Frith Kaiser Thompson: "Lizard's Tail", "Quick Sign"
- Dropera (1991) by Fred & Ferd (Fred Frith and Ferdinand Richard): "Hola, On Danse!"
- Helter Skelter (1992) by Fred Frith and François-Michel Pesenti: "Dark as a Match"
- Allies (1996) by Fred Frith: "Rock and a Hard Place", "Small Mercy II"

== Performance venues ==
The tracks on That House We Lived In were taken from Keep the Dog's final European tour in May and June 1991, and performed at:

- Theater Am Kornmarkt, Bregenz, Austria
- Elizabethenbuhne, Salzburg, Austria
- Kulturzentrum Wolkenstein, Stainach, Austria
- Bahnhof Langendreer, Bochum, Germany
- Fabrik, Hamburg, Germany
- Manufaktur, Shondorf, Germany
- Teatro Dada, Castelfranco Emilia, Italy
- Shocking Club, Milan, Italy
- Verona, Italy

== Personnel ==
- Fred Frith – guitar, bass guitar, violin, voice
- René Lussier – guitar, bass guitar
- Jean Derome – alto saxophone, baritone saxophone, flute, guimbarde, voice
- Zeena Parkins – accordion, electric harp, piano, synthesizer, voice
- Charles Hayward – drums, found objects, melodica, voice
- Bob Ostertag – sampling keyboard
- Claudia Engelhart – live sound mix, DAT recording

=== Production ===
- Jon Leidecker – first montage and final cleanup
- Fred Frith – producer
- Peter Hardt – engineer
- Myles Boisen – mastering
- Edited and sequenced at Jankowski Studio, Esslingen, Germany, July 2002
- Mastered at Headless Buddha Mastering Labs, Oakland, United States, March 2003
