= Allies (Fred Frith album) =

Studio album by Fred Frith
- Released: 1996
- Recorded: October 1989 and August 1995
- Genre: Experimental rock; avant-garde jazz
- Length: 40:36
- Label: RecRec (Switzerland)
- Producer: Bebe Miller

Fred Frith chronology
| Middle of the Moment (1995) | Allies (1996) | Eye to Ear (1997) |

Music for Dance series chronology
| The Technology of Tears (1988) | Allies (1996) | The Previous Evening (1997) |

Allies (Music for Dance Volume 2) is a 1996 studio album by English guitarist, composer and improvisor Fred Frith. It is the second of a series of Music for Dance albums Frith made.

The album is a suite of music composed and recorded by Frith in 1989 for choreographer Bebe Miller's dance performance at the Brooklyn Academy of Music's "Next Wave Festival". The music was later revised and remixed in 1995, and released on CD in 1996.

== Background ==
Allies was commissioned by Miller for a dance performance at the "Next Wave Festival" at the Brooklyn Academy of Music. It premiered at the academy in Brooklyn, New York City in November 1989, and consisted of two segments, "Rain", a 10-minute solo piece by Miller, with music by Hearn Gadbois, and "Allies", a 40-minute performance by six dancers, with music by Frith.

Frith composed and recorded Allies in six movements for Miller in October 1989 with musicians Tom Cora and George Cartwright, with whom he had been collaborating for several years. The percussion on the recording was provided by a drum machine that Frith had programmed.

In August 1995 Frith began preparing Allies for release on an album, but was unhappy with the computerised drumming. He asked drummer Joey Baron of Naked City (in which Frith also played bass guitar) to record new drum tracks for the compositions. The 1989 recording (with the original computerised drumming) was remixed with Baron's 1995 drumming, and released by RecRec Music on CD in 1996.

== Reception ==
Professional ratings
Review scores
| Source | Rating |
|---|---|
| AllMusic | 4/5 stars |
| All About Jazz | 2.5/5 stars |

In a review for AllMusic, Uncle Dave Lewis wrote: "For those who have ears to hear it, Allies will please repeatedly, and it remains one of Frith's most satisfying efforts in a long career typified by excellence."

All About Jazz reviewer James Taylor called the album "a shining example of Frith's compositional skill," noting that it "is laden with highly rhythmic and oddly timed melodies that are deconstructed and reconstructed, cut and spliced into new patterns."

George Logan of Scottish Photography commented: "What is particularly interesting to me is that the music though composed for dance in 1989, a dissatisfied Frith kept it in mind to get it perfect, to improve upon it. A lesser artist possibly wouldn't bother. The moral being, 'if it's worth doing it's worth taking the time'."

Reviewing the album at Leonardo Online, René van Peer described Allies as "a river of sound to float around in". He noted how Baron's drumming, recorded six years after the original recording, seamlessly blends in with the music. Van Peer opined that Frith put a great deal of "careful and thoughtful" work into constructing this album. Jeff Jackson wrote in Jazziz Magazine that while Allies has its roots in jazz, it also includes elements of rock, classical music and hip-hop. He described the album as a mix of "careful composition and freewheeling improvisation", making it "[b]oth intricate and accessible", and "a beautifully sustained 40-minute suite".

Chris Cutler, Frith's former Henry Cow band mate, described Allies on RēR Megacorp as,

One of Fred's open field type compositions – where parallel events proceed serenely, coinciding half-unpredictably, but still often enough to sound connected. There is continuity in modular repetition but so many overlays, small alterations, emergent details and new material that the sonic terrain they invoke is constantly mutating and constantly unpredictable (even after several auditions). Continuity is here irregularly interrupted by disruptive events, always settling back into semi-stable planes.

== Track listing ==
All music is composed by Fred Frith.

| No. | Title | Length |
|---|---|---|
| 1. | "Rifka" | 9:36 |
| 2. | "Small Mercy I" | 4:25 |
| 3. | "Nenad" | 7:52 |
| 4. | "A Rock and a Hard Place" | 6:17 |
| 5. | "Davor and Dzeneta" | 6:24 |
| 6. | "Small Mercy II" | 6:02 |

== Personnel ==
- Fred Frith – bass guitar, guitar, violin, keyboards, drum machine, tape manipulations
- Tom Cora – cello
- George Cartwright – alto saxophone
- Joey Baron – drums

=== Production ===
- Recorded at BC Studios, Brooklyn, October 1989
  - Martin Bisi – engineer
- Revised and remixed at the Fabrik, Munich, August 1995
  - Benno Grodon – engineer
- Mastered at Studio Jankowski, Stuttgart, November 1995
  - Peter Hardt – engineer
- Tomas Kurth – cover artwork
- Heike Liss – photography
- Bebe Miller – producer

== Re-issues ==
In 2004 Fred Records issued a remastered version of the album, which Frith dedicated to Daniel Waldner: "For Daniel, with love and gratitude". Waldner was the co-founder (with Veit F. Stauffer) of RecRec Music, Frith's record label in the 1990s. Waldner had died in a mountain climbing accident in 1995, precipitating the collapse of the label in 1997.
