= Middle of the Moment (soundtrack) =

Soundtrack album by Fred Frith
- Released: 1995
- Recorded: Early 1990s, North Africa and Europe
- Genre: Experimental rock; electronic music
- Length: 60:40
- Label: RecRec (Switzerland)
- Producer: Fred Frith

Fred Frith chronology
The Art of Memory (1994)	Middle of the Moment (1995)	Allies (1996)

Music for Film series chronology
Step Across the Border (1990)	Middle of the Moment (1995)	Eye to Ear (1997)

Middle of the Moment is a soundtrack by English guitarist, composer and improvisor Fred Frith, of the 1995 documentary film, Middle of the Moment by Nicolas Humbert and Werner Penzel.

The film was made over a period of three years in the early 1990s, following the tuareg in North Africa and an avant garde circus troupe, Cirque O in Europe. The music comprises Frith compositions and sound collages drawn from field recordings of ambient sounds, conversations and indigenous music.

Frith describes how he created the soundtrack:

I 'travelled' through this material, formed my impressions, and created a 'sound-movie' from them, using a process analogous to that of editing a film ... My idea is more to create a parallel narrative, free to draw on music that wasn't in the film but was part of the process of making it.

== Reception ==
Professional ratings
Review scores
Source	Rating
AllMusic	3/5 stars

In a review of Middle of the Moment in AllMusic, Brian Olewnick said the predominance of found sounds recorded during the making of the film makes this "[m]ore of a real soundtrack" than usual. He stated that the way Frith merges these natural sounds with his own music, which vary from "drawn-out, evocative guitar plaints to jaunty, acerbic accordion dances", works well. Olewnick added that Middle of the Moment "fits in comfortably with many of [Frith's] mature works", like his Pacifica (1998).

Writing in The Wire, Clive Bell also felt that Middle of the Moment is not a "conventional" soundtrack. He stated that the ambient sounds recorded during the making of the film blend seamlessly into the music, adding that he liked Frith's former Henry Cow band mate Tim Hodgkinson's "luxuriously squealing clarinet", and the way it "collapses into the sound of Tuareg women drumming, whooping and chasing each other."

== Track listing ==
All music is composed by Fred Frith

No.	Title	Length
1.	"Le Jour Se Leve"	6:26
2.	"Moving"	3:55
3.	"Digging For Water"	2:34
4.	"Portrait I" / "Tam-Tam in Timia"	3:28
5.	"Le Cirque"	7:10
6.	"Robert Lax Is"	0:58
7.	"Gnawa Express Tanger"	3:01
8.	"Bell Song"	2:37
9.	"Portrait II"	1:44
10.	"Ghost Stories"	6:50
11.	"Portes Ouvertes"	3:43
12.	"Le Cirque-Oh!" / "Ghost Dance" / "Portrait III"	10:43
13.	"Le Jour S'Arrache"	2:59
14.	"Middle of the Moment (title theme)"	4:32
Total length:		1:00:40

== Personnel ==
- Fred Frith – guitar, bass, violin, keyboards, percussion
- Fabrizio Appelius – accordion
- Mikaela Dietl – accordion
- Tim Hodgkinson – clarinet, bass clarinet, alto saxophone
- Robert Lax – voice
- Sandra M'Bow – voice

=== Tuareg ===
- Idaman walat Akhmudan – voice
- Tshanak ag Abalbal – voice
- women from the Kel Iforas tribe – vocals, drumming

=== Cirque O ===
- Josefina Lehmann – violin
- Johann le Guillerm – accordion, voice
- Bertrand Duva – Tibetan rattles
- Attila Zombori – drums, percussion, guimbarde

== Production ==
- Peter Hardt – engineer

== Re-issues ==
- In 2004 Fred Records issued a remastered version of the soundtrack.
