= Accidental (album) =

Studio album by Fred Frith
- Released: March 2002
- Recorded: December 1995 – January 1996
- Studios: Studio Jankowski, Stuttgart, Germany
- Genre: Experimental rock
- Length: 39:25
- Label: Fred (UK)
- Producer: Fred Frith

Fred Frith chronology
Freedom in Fragments (2002)	Accidental (2002)	Prints (2002)

Music for Dance series chronology
The Previous Evening (1997)	Accidental (2002)	The Happy End Problem (2006)

Accidental (Music for Dance Volume 3) is a studio album by English guitarist, composer and improvisor Fred Frith. It is the third of a series of Music for Dance albums Frith made, (Note: The Previous Evening (1997) was released before Accidental (2002), but was designated "Music for Dance Volume 4" after Accidental's release.) and was recorded between December 1995 and January 1996 at Studio Jankowski in Stuttgart, Germany. The album was released on CD in March 2002 on Fred Records and was the first release in Frith's archival release program on the record label.

== Background ==
Accidental was commissioned in 1995 by the British choreographer Paul Selwyn Norton for the dance piece "Rogue Tool", with funding provided by the British Council through the British/Israeli cultural initiative, BI Arts. "Rogue Tool" was premiered by the Batsheva Dance Company in Tel Aviv, Israel in February 1996.

Frith constructed the music on Accidental using a principle he called "block-melodies" and he incorporated random events, or "accidents", into the compositions, including "found sounds" and field recordings, to trigger new patterns. Frith explained the background to the making of the album:

I'm fascinated by accidents. When I do solo improvisations I think of myself as being in continuous dialogue with the unexpected, and its always dynamic. Do I ignore this, do I embrace it, do I integrate it, do I keep my distance? When making this music I was constantly using random elements like radio tuning and trying to frame them in metric or harmonic structures.

== Reception ==
Professional ratings
Review scores
Source	Rating
BBC	favorable
AllMusic	4/5 stars

Bill Tilland of the BBC wrote in a review of this album:

It's fairly standard practice for dance companies to commission "new music" composers to write (and sometimes perform) material for dance performances, and nearly all such work has moments of purely musical interest. But none that I can remember leaves such a strong overall impression as this one. Accidental is a real tribute to Frith's imaginative faculties.

In a review for AllMusic, François Couture commented: "Accidental may not be as ambitious, challenging, or cutting-edge as the man's other output from the 1990s, but it sure sounds sweet to fans of his avant rock work from the previous two decades. Recommended."

Chris Brook, writing for the Rough Guide to Rock, stated that the album title "suggest[s] exactly the principles behind the compositions," and noted that the recording "took elements as diverse as improvised mandolin and random radio tunings and assembled them into a mesmerizing whole."

Jesse Jarnow of Jambands.com remarked: "When I listen to Accidental... I don't think in terms of narrative... I imagine something moving. That's not to say that I visualize anything, either. It just moves. It's a feeling I don't get from... other proper dance/groove music. Groove music makes one move, but there is often little movement within it." He concluded that Accidental "invert[s] that idea, but keep[s] it just as compelling, and a lot more challenging."

== Track listing ==
All tracks composed by Fred Frith.

No.	Title	Length
1.	"The Tangled Bank"	3:40
2.	"Hit and Run"	2:57
3.	"Gatto Nero"	1:33
4.	"Old Geometry"	2:24
5.	"Their Blood is Black and Yellow"	4:33
6.	"In a Heartbeat"	1:15
7.	"Fooled Again"	5:04
8.	"Accidental"	3:27
9.	"Absinthe Memories (for Phil Minton)"	3:00
10.	"Incoming"	6:20
11.	"Almighty Home at Last"	5:12

== Personnel ==
- Fred Frith – guitars, violin, keyboards, percussion, samplers, voice

=== Sound ===
- Extraneous material taken from recordings of demonstrations in New York City and Washington, D.C., and random radio tunings
- Engineered by Peter Hardt
- Edited and mastered by Peter Hardt and Fred Frith, July 2000
- Design and artwork by Tomas Kurth
