= The Previous Evening =

Studio album by Fred Frith
- Released: 1997
- Recorded: 1993, 1996, Germany
- Genre: Modern classical; experimental rock
- Length: 55:31
- Label: Recommended (UK)
- Producer: Amanda Miller

Fred Frith chronology
Eye to Ear (1997)	The Previous Evening (1997)	Pacifica (1998)

Music for Dance series chronology
Allies (1996)	The Previous Evening (1997)	Accidental (2002)

The Previous Evening (Music for Dance Volume 4) is a studio album by English guitarist, composer and improviser Fred Frith. It is the fourth of a series of Music for Dance albums Frith made, (Note: The Previous Evening (1997), released before Accidental (Music for Dance Volume 3) (2002), was designated "Music for Dance Volume 4" after Accidental was released.) and was recorded in Germany in 1993 and 1996.

The Previous Evening was composed by Frith and is divided into three parts, in which Frith pays homage to three contemporary classical composers, John Cage, Morton Feldman and Earle Brown. The CD booklet also contains the following dedication: "This recording is dedicated to my father, Donald Frith, whose support has been and continues to be warm and unwavering."

== Background ==
The Previous Evening was originally commissioned by United States choreographer Amanda Miller. Part I was premiered by the London Contemporary Dance Theatre at Sadler's Wells, London in December 1993. Parts II and III were premiered by the Pretty Ugly Dance Company in 1996, at the Tiroler Landestheater, Innsbruck and the Berliner Hebbel Theater, respectively.

Frith incorporated elements of John Cage, Morton Feldman and Earle Brown's working methods into the respective pieces on the album. "Fragments of text heard in Part I were taken at random from John Cage's book Silence: Lectures and Writings. Tape editing, the structure of events, and dynamic markings in this section were also determined using chance methods." An Australian Dawn chorus appears in Part III, and other sound sources include works by Cage, Schumann, Mozart and "some bits and pieces of my own earlier work."

== Reception ==
Professional ratings
Review scores
Source	Rating
AllMusic	4/5 stars

In a review for AllMusic, Rick Anderson wrote: "Long-standing fans of Fred Frith may not recognize his voice easily in this music, but all of it is worth listening to."

Rob Walker, writing for Exposé Online, commented: "Frith seems to acknowledge and utilize each composer's characteristic creative style in his own writing. These pieces are thus intriguing in the way they are identifiably Frith's, yet bear the cosignature of another giant of modern music... A challenging and adventurous work that is certainly not for the faint of heart, The Previous Evening adds an intriguing new element to Frith's substantial oeuvre of innovative and experimental music."

== Track listing ==
All tracks composed by Fred Frith.

No.	Title	Length
1.	"Part I (Homage to John Cage)"	19:40
2.	"Part II (Homage to Morton Feldman)"	22:35
3.	"Part III (Homage to Earle Brown)"	13:16

== Personnel ==
- Fred Frith – all instruments (except those listed below), tape manipulations, voice
- Christian Kaya – clarinets (1)
- Claudio Puntin – clarinets (2,3)
- Heike Liss – percussion (1)
- Bern Settelmeyer – percussion (2,3)
- Bernd Weber – voice (1)

=== Sound ===
- Track 1 recorded by Benedykt Grodon at Studio Grodon, Munich, Germany, Spring of 1993
- Tracks 2 and 3 recorded by Peter Hardt at Studio Jankowski, Stuttgart, Germany, April and June 1996
- Amanda Miller – producer
- Heike Liss – art work
- Jon Crossland – design
