= The Art of Memory II =

Live album by Fred Frith and John Zorn
- Released: May 2008
- Recorded: January 1983 and July 1985
- Venue: P.A.S.S. and Roulette, New York City
- Genre: Experimental rock; free improvisation
- Length: 57:11
- Label: Fred FRA 06

Fred Frith and John Zorn chronology
50th Birthday Celebration Volume Five (2004)	The Art of Memory II (2008)	Late Works (2010)

Fred Frith chronology
Back to Life (2008)	The Art of Memory II (2008)	To Sail, to Sail (2008)

John Zorn chronology
Zaebos: Book of Angels Volume 11 (2007)	The Art of Memory II (2008)	Filmworks XX: Sholem Aleichem (2008)

The Art of Memory II is a live album of improvised experimental rock music by Fred Frith and John Zorn. It was recorded in New York City in January 1983 and July 1985, and was released on Frith's Fred Records label in May 2008. It is the second in a series of two Art of Memory albums recorded by the duo, the first being The Art of Memory, recorded in New York City in late 1993, and released on Derek Bailey's Incus Records label in 1994.

The Art of Memory II, recorded before The Art of Memory and described by Frith as "early 80s weirdness with John Zorn" marked the beginning of a long and fruitful musical partnership between Frith and Zorn. The concerts, recorded using a cassette recorder, were "on the borderline between music and chaos" and featured Frith and Zorn playing a number of unconventional instruments.

== Reception ==
Professional ratings
Review scores
Source	Rating
AllMusic	4/5 stars

AllMusic said "Sometimes they seem to be responding to each other's ideas, other times they're engaged in parallel but unrelated play like two toddlers side by side in a sandbox. Amazingly, there's hardly an uninteresting sound anywhere on this album. Highly recommended to all skronk fans."

== Track listing ==
All tracks by Fred Frith and John Zorn.

1. "The Heaven" – 17:37
2. "The Wood" – 4:43
3. "The Standard" – 8:46
4. "The Wheel" – 5:44
5. "The Painter" – 20:21

== Personnel ==
- Fred Frith – home-made instruments, voice, Casio monophonic keyboard
- John Zorn – alto saxophone, mouthpieces, duck-calls

== Sound ==
- Tracks 1 and 5 were recorded live at P.A.S.S., New York City on 25 January 1983.
- Tracks 2, 3 and 4 were recorded live at Roulette, New York City on 27–28 July 1985.
- The album was assembled by Fred Frith and Bob Boster from the original cassette recordings at the Center for Contemporary Music, Mills College in April 1997.
