= The Happy End Problem =

Studio album by Fred Frith
- Released: 2006
- Recorded: 2003 and 2004
- Studio: Guerrilla Recordings, Oakland, California
- Genre: Experimental rock
- Length: 51:13
- Label: Fred (UK)
- Producer: Fred Frith

Fred Frith chronology
Impur (2006)	The Happy End Problem (2006)	The Stone: Issue Two (2007)

Music for Dance series chronology
Accidental (2002)	The Happy End Problem (2006)	Nowhere, Sideshow, Thin Air (2009)

The Happy End Problem (Music for Dance Volume 5) is a studio album by English guitarist, composer and improvisor Fred Frith, and is the fifth of a series of Music for Dance albums he made. It comprises two suites composed in 2003 by Frith "for flute, bassoon, gu zheng, percussion, violin and electronics" and was recorded in 2003 and 2004.

== Background ==
The two suites on the album, "Imitation" and "The Happy End Problem" were composed by Frith for small ensembles of six and seven musicians. They were originally commissioned in 2003 by choreographer Amanda Miller for two dances for her The Pretty Ugly Dance Company. Both suites premiered at the Stadttheater in Freiburg, Germany, "The Happy End Problem" in May 2003 and "Imitation" in April 2004.

In "The Happy End Problem" Frith drew on elements from Igor Stravinsky's 1910 ballet, Firebird Suite. "Imitation" focused on Oriental elements and played on the Western world's perception of Japan. At the time, the shakuhachi player, Kikutsubo Day was a student of Frith's at Mills College in the United States, and he constructed "Imitation" around her playing.

== Reception ==
Professional ratings
Review scores
Source	Rating
All About Jazz	4.5/5 stars
AllMusic	favorable

A reviewer at Sea of Tranquility summed up the album with the following comment:

"Overall two highly accomplished and fascinating pieces of music, more perhaps for the classical enthusiast than the progger."

In a review for AllMusic, François Couture wrote: "Whether you prefer the calm of 'Imitation' or the more disquieting overtones of 'The Happy End Problem,' both pieces fare very well without their choreographed component."

John Kelman of All About Jazz commented: "The Happy End Problem... is a fine summation of Frith's career to date: enigmatic beauty juxtaposed with near-minimalist tendencies; occasional passages of jagged but strangely appealing edges and unapologetic free play blending with cued compositional sections; and a confluence of cultural references that are unmistakable, even as they join together for a new, unified whole."

Writing for Paris Transatlantic, Massimo Ricci stated that "the music benefits enormously from the stunning performances of all the players involved," and, regarding the final track, remarked: "My soul undergoes a meltdown about 15 minutes into the track, when Wu Fei's delicate gu zheng figures remind us of the frailty of purpose amidst the often overwhelming forces of life... one of the most touching sections of... an instant classic."

== Track listing ==
1. "Imitation"
  1. "Ukon" (Frith) – 6:18
  2. "Kira" (Frith) – 5:37
  3. "Kio" (Frith, Scanlon) – 2:33
  4. "Tan" (Frith, Scanlon) – 3:05
  5. "Shi--o" (Frith) – 1:33
  6. "Beni" (Frith) – 3:52
  7. "Kasumi" (Frith) – 2:15
  8. "Sumi" (Frith) – 1:12
  9. "Hanabira" (Frith, Scanlon) – 3:48
2. "The Happy End Problem" (Frith) – 21:00

== Personnel ==
- Fred Frith – guitar, bass guitar, laptop instruments
- Kikutsubo Day (1-9) – shakuhachi
- Carla Kihlstedt – violin
- William Winant – percussion
- Theresa Wong (1-9) – cello
- Patrice Scanlon – electronics, clarinet
- Sheela Bringi (10) – flute
- Heather Vorwerck (10) – cello
- Wu Fei (10) – gu zheng

=== Sound and artwork ===
- "Imitation" recorded at Guerrilla Recordings, Oakland, California, February 2004
- "The Happy End Problem" recorded at Guerrilla Recordings, Oakland, California, February 2003
- Engineered, mixed and mastered by Myles Boisen
- Artwork by Tom Kurth
