= Fred Records =

British independent record label

- Parent company: Recommended Records
- Founded: 2002
- Founder: Fred Frith
- Distributors: RēR Megacorp (UK); RēR USA (USA); Locus Solus (Japan)
- Genre: Rock in Opposition; Avant-rock; Experimental music
- Country of origin: England
- Location: Thornton Heath, Surrey
- Official website: Fred Records

Fred Records is a British independent record label created in 2002 by the English guitarist, composer and improvisor Fred Frith to re-release his own back catalogue of recordings and previously unreleased material. It is an independent company working in co-operation with Chris Cutler and Recommended Records, utilising Recommended Records' distribution network.

== Background ==
From the mid-1980s, Frith released much of his music (solo and in collaboration with other musicians) on the Swiss independent record label RecRec Music. However, the label went bankrupt in 1997 after its founder, Daniel Waldner died in a mountaineering accident in 1995. Under Swiss copyright law all the rights to Frith's music released by RecRec reverted to him, totalling 13 different titles. Having lost money in unpaid royalties, Frith wanted to re-release all the titles on a single label. In the early 2000s, and with the help of Chris Cutler of Recommended Records, Frith set up his own label, Fred Records as an imprint of Recommended Records.

The new label gave Frith an opportunity to re-issue material from his archives that would have been difficult to release elsewhere. Advances in technology also enabled him to remaster the original recordings and to produce a sound much closer to what was originally intended. In addition, Frith has released previously unreleased material by himself and in collaboration with other musicians. To create a consistent image for the label as a whole, Frith has artist Tomas Kurth illustrate the CD covers, often incorporating elements of the original LP covers in the design.

== Tributaries ==
Currently, the Fred Records catalogue is divided into three tributaries:

- FRO (Fred Records Original) – re-releases of Frith's previously released original material
- FRA (Fred Records Archive) – releases of previously unreleased material from Frith's archive
- FRFC (Fred Records French Connection) – releases of previously unreleased material from Frith's archive recorded in France.

The catalogue numbers of each release include one of these tributary codes. For example, "RēR/FRA 02" reads "Recommended Records / Fred Records Archive #2".

== Releases ==
These are all the titles currently released on the Fred Records label.

Year released	Catalogue no.	Artist	Title
2002	RēR/FRO 01	Fred Frith	Gravity
2002	RēR/FRA 01	Fred Frith	Accidental
2002	RēR/FRO 02	Fred Frith	Guitar Solos
2002	RēR/FRA 02	Fred Frith	Prints
2003	RēR/FRA 03	Keep the Dog	That House We Lived In
2003	RēR/FRO 03	Fred Frith	Step Across the Border
2003	RēR/FRO 04	Fred Frith	Speechless
2004	RēR/FRO 05	Fred Frith	Middle of the Moment
2004	RēR/FRO 06	Fred Frith	Cheap at Half the Price
2004	RēR/FRO 07	Fred Frith	Allies
2005	RēR/FRO 8/9	Skeleton Crew	Learn to Talk / Country of Blinds
2005	RēR/FRO 10	Massacre	Killing Time
2006	RēR/FRFC 01	Fred Frith	Impur
2006	RēR/FRA 05	Fred Frith	The Happy End Problem
2008	RēR/FRO 11	Fred Frith	The Technology of Tears
2008	RēR/FRA 06	Fred Frith & John Zorn	The Art of Memory II
2009	RēR/FRFC 02	Fred Frith	Impur II
2009	RēR/FRA 07	Fred Frith	Nowhere, Sideshow, Thin Air
2010	RēR/FRO 12	Fred Frith	Live in Japan
2015	RēR/FRA 08	Fred Frith	Field Days (The Amanda Loops)
2015	RēR/FRO 13	Fred Frith	Propaganda
2021	RēR/FRSB1	Fred Frith	The Fred Records Story 2001–2020 Volume 1: Rocking the Boat
2021	RēR/FRSB2	Fred Frith	The Fred Records Story 2001–2020 Volume 2: Crossing Borders
2021	RēR/FRSB3	Fred Frith	The Fred Records Story 2001–2020 Volume 3: Stepping Out
2021	RēR/TCCCFF	Tom Cora, Chris Cutler, Fred Frith	Live in Tel Aviv and Aubervilliers (Note: A limited edition bonus CD included in the Fred Records Story box set.)

== See also ==
- List of record labels
- List of independent UK record labels
