= The Technology of Tears =

Studio album by Fred Frith
- Released: 1988
- Recorded: 1986–1987, United States
- Genres: Avant-rock; experimental
- Length: 82:59 (LP releases); 60:15 (CD releases)
- Label: RecRec (Switzerland)
- Producer: Fred Frith

Fred Frith chronology
Nous Autres (1987)	The Technology of Tears (1988)	The Top of His Head (1989)

Music for Dance series chronology
The Technology of Tears (1988)	Allies (1996)

The Technology of Tears (And Other Music for Dance and Theatre) is a double album by English guitarist, composer and improvisor Fred Frith. It is the first of a series of Music for Dance albums Frith made, and is sometimes subtitled Music for Dance volume 1. It was recorded between June 1986 and April 1987, and released on a double LP and a single CD by RecRec Music (Switzerland), and on a double LP only by SST Records (United States) in 1988. It was re-issued on CD in 2008 by Fred Records (United Kingdom). All the CD releases omit the Propaganda suite (side 4 of the double LP).

The album comprises three suites:

- The Technology of Tears, commissioned by Rosalind Newman and first performed by her dance company at the Joyce Theatre, New York City in February 1987;
- Jigsaw, commissioned by the Concert Dance Company of Boston as a collaboration between Fred Frith, Rosalind Newman and Pier Voulkos and funded in part by the National Endowment for the Arts and the New Works Program of the Massachusetts Council on the Arts and Humanities;
- Propaganda (omitted on the CD releases), commissioned by the Creation Production Company, written and directed by Matthew Maguire and first performed at La Mama ETC in New York City from 1 to 24 May 1987.

Frith composed all the music and plays most of the instruments, with assistance from John Zorn, Tenko Ueno, Christian Marclay and Jim Staley.

The Propaganda suite was reworked and remastered in February 2015, and released by Fred Records as Propaganda in November 2015.

== Content ==
On The Technology of Tears, Fred Frith continues his exploration of world dance music he began on Gravity and Speechless, this time supplementing traditional instrumentation with digital technology to generate patterns, pulses and noise. Samples are used throughout, accompanied by horns, sporadic percussion and wordless vocals. The album is a mix of musique concrète, folk music and improvisation.

The three-movement Technology of Tears suite was commissioned by Rosalind Newman. She had previously used parts of Frith's Gravity and Skeleton Crew's Learn to Talk to choreograph sequences for her dance company. For Technology of Tears, Frith worked closely with Newman. He explained:

She kind of gave me an idea of the sort of direction she wanted me to start from, and we planned out a structure of the piece, and then I would go and work on it and bring back my work. And she would criticize it and we would edit it together... It was a very important learning process for me because I had never worked with a non-musician in that way... Sometimes she would make a suggestion that I really wouldn't like, but in the end, with compromise on both sides, we both ended up being pretty happy with the result.

On the first part of the Technology of Tears suite, Frith experiments with Henry Kaiser's newly acquired synclavier, at the time the state-of-the-art sampling and processing technology. On parts two and three of the suite Frith plays mostly "low-grade" instruments with added samples by turntablist Christian Marclay. Jigsaw is a collection of dozens of musical cells, "each recorded separately in increments of between 3 and 12 measures; all at the same tempo, and in the same key". The intention was that the modules could be assembled in any order to create the final piece. The reason for this approach was that Newman had requested that many changes be made, and with Jigsaw she could arrange the segments how she wished. In the end, she accepted Frith's demonstration sequence as the final piece.

== Reception ==
Professional ratings
Review scores
Source	Rating
AllMusic	4.5/5 stars
DownBeat	3.5/5 stars

A reviewer at AllMusic, "Blue" Gene Tyranny, described the Technology of Tears suite as "... unrelenting slices of hard-edged sounds over a pulse ...", Jigsaw as "... patterns with constantly shifting accents and sub-divisions ...", and Propaganda as "... a series of brilliantly evocative soundpieces with electronics, guitar, and sound effects ...".

Reviewing the 2008 CD release of the album in the music journal, Notes, Rick Anderson described the three-part Technology of Tears suite as a "pulsing barrage of sounds", broken occasionally by Frith's East-European rhythms and "angular" melodies, and Zorn's "atonal squawks". He found the sounds "attractive enough in themselves", but at times "a bit overwhelming in this dense and complex context". Anderson called Jigsaw "a highly episodic collection of brief sound collages, each of them built on pulsing but sometimes quirky rhythms". He said it is Frith's "good humor and wit" that stops this work from becoming "purely assaultive skronk", and added that "there is a cheerfulness to even his most abrasive work that makes it far more listenable than that of many of his other ... colleagues of the period".

Nicole V. Gagné was a little more critical of the album. She wrote in her 1990 book, Sonic Transports: New Frontiers in Our Music that while it "has some beautiful stuff, [it] mines a rather narrow vein in Frith's music; a beat-dominated, humorless, and strident vein". She opined that the writing in the Technology of Tears suite "is unexpectedly weak", but had praise for Frith's bass playing towards the end of Part 1, and the inclusion of guests Marclay, Tenko and Zorn. Gagné felt much the same about the Jigsaw suit, adding that "Frith's weird playing and tape manipulations start sounding more arbitrary or just clever or even redundant." However, she liked Jigsaw's coda, calling it "superb – a memorably moody landscape refined from selected gestures of the piece." Gagné called the 14 tracks in Propaganda "a persuasive suite", adding that "they all seem to reflect and support each other through Frith's shifting atmospheres: barren landscapes punctuated by an ominous thudding pulse".

== Track listing ==
All tracks composed by Fred Frith.

=== LP releases ===
Side A: The Technology of Tears
No.	Title	Length
1.	"Sadness, Its Bones Bleached Behind Us"	13:05
2.	"You Are What You Eat"	7:22

Side B: The Technology of Tears (continued)
No.	Title	Length
3.	"You Are What You Eat (continued)"	11:39
4.	"The Palace of Laughter, The Technology of Tears"	10:08

Side C: Jigsaw
No.	Title	Length
5.	"Jigsaw"	14:39
6.	"Jigsaw Coda"	3:04

Side D: Propaganda
No.	Title	Length
7.	"Shelter For Them All"	1:36
8.	"A Deeper Understanding of Conflict"	0:54
9.	"The Turning of an Hourglass"	2:04
10.	"Birth of a Rebel"	1:51
11.	"Your Beautiful Corpse"	1:17
12.	"The Excellent Hyena"	1:25
13.	"The Old Man Moves a Mountain"	1:06
14.	"The Wolf Demon (part 1)"	1:07
15.	"Meditation Upon Propaganda"	3:06
16.	"Liberty"	1:59
17.	"The Relentless Landscape"	0:59
18.	"The Gaze That Sings"	1:03
19.	"The Wolf Demon (part 2)"	1:05
20.	"Rashomon"	3:30

=== CD releases ===
The Technology of Tears
No.	Title	Length
1.	"Sadness, Its Bones Bleached Behind Us"	13:18
2.	"You Are What You Eat"	18:46
3.	"The Palace of Laughter, The Technology of Tears"	10:16

Jigsaw
No.	Title	Length
4.	"Jigsaw"	14:48
5.	"Jigsaw Coda"	3:07

== Personnel ==
- Fred Frith – guitars, violin, percussion, keyboards, synclavier, voice
- John Zorn – alto saxophone (The Technology of Tears)
- Tenko Ueno – voice (The Technology of Tears)
- Christian Marclay – turntables (The Technology of Tears)
- Jim Staley – trombone (Jigsaw)

=== Production ===
- The Technology of Tears – recorded BC Studios, June 1986; Noise New York, November 1986 to January 1987; Synclavier recorded in California, June 1986 with programming
- Jigsaw – recorded Noise New York, October 1986
- Propaganda – recorded Noise New York, April 1987
- Digitally remastered at New York Digital, August 1987
- Cover images and photos – Pierre Hébert
- Cover design – Peter Bäder

== Works cited ==
- Gagné, Nicole V. (1990). Sonic Transports: New Frontiers in Our Music. De Falco Books. ISBN 978-0-9625145-0-0.
