= Nowhere, Sideshow, Thin Air =

Studio album by Fred Frith
- Released: September 2009
- Recorded: 2000, 2001, 2007
- Studio: Guerrilla Recordings, Oakland, California
- Genre: Experimental music
- Length: 76:38
- Label: Fred (UK)
- Producer: Fred Frith

Fred Frith chronology
Impur II (2009)	Nowhere, Sideshow, Thin Air (2009)	Late Works (2010)

Music for Dance series chronology
The Happy End Problem (2006)	Nowhere, Sideshow, Thin Air (2009)	Field Days (The Amanda Loops) (2015)

Nowhere, Sideshow, Thin Air (Music for Dance Volume 6) is a studio album by English guitarist, composer and improvisor Fred Frith, and is the sixth of a series of Music for Dance albums he made.

Nowhere, Sideshow, Thin Air consists of three commissions by three choreographers, each sharing, according to Frith, "a certain obsession with melodic deconstruction". "Nowhere" and "Sideshow" were written by Frith for violinist Carla Kihlstedt, and are performed by Frith, Kihlstedt and others. "Thin Air" features Frith, Hande Erdem (violin) and Theresa Wong (cello).

== Reception ==
Professional ratings
Review scores
Source	Rating
All About Jazz	4.5/5 stars

In a review for All About Jazz, John Kelman called the album a "genre-busting disc that catholically references a variety of styles, but ultimately transcends all of its sources." He noted that "even when he's being lyrical... Frith skews his music to the left of center; distinctly personal even when eminently hummable."

Exposé Online's Peter Thelen praised "Thin Air," stating that although it "encompasses what is easily the most sparse and avant-garde music" of the three works, "some of the most interesting and enjoyable sounds on the disc are found herewithin."

Writing for The Squid's Ear, Massimo Ricci commented: "The large majority of this album is enough to let us affirm that, in the age of polluted silence, we still need this man's unsurpassed intuitions like oxygen."

== Track listing ==
All compositions by Fred Frith.

1. "Nowhere" – commissioned by choreographer Paul Selwyn Norton and performed at The Hague in November 2000
  1. "Nowhere to Run" – 5:17
  2. "Nowhere Near" – 3:19
  3. "Nowhere to be Seen" – 3:10
  4. "Nowhere Else" – 1:43
  5. "Nowhere Can Compare" – 2:21
  6. "Getting Nowhere" – 2:27
  7. "Going Nowhere" – 2:25
  8. "Nowhere to Hide" – 3:08
2. "Sideshow" – commissioned by choreographer and director Peggy Piacenza and performed as part of the Northwest New Works Festival in 2001
  1. "Clearing the Throat" – 3:34
  2. "Show Time" – 7:24
  3. "On Or in the Wing" – 3:13
  4. "Act Two" – 3:31
  5. "Angels With Thirty Faces" – 5:17
  6. "In Which All May Have Been Resolved" – 5:27
  7. "Ghost of BB" – 1:48
  8. "Ms. Mac Drinks and Goes Home" – 1:19
3. "Thin Air" – commissioned by choreographer Uchizono Donna Norton and performed in New York in October 2007
  1. "Ladders" – 6:52
  2. "Screened" – 1:35
  3. "Plastic" – 3:01
  4. "Running" – 3:51
  5. "Falling" – 3:27
  6. "Fast Feet" – 2:29

== Personnel ==
- Fred Frith – electric guitar, acoustic guitar, bass guitar, keyboards, percussion, computing, samples, radio, running, bass mbira, low-grade violin, voice
- Carla Kihlstedt – violin ("Nowhere", "Sideshow")
- Fred Guiliano – samples ("Sideshow")
- Gail Brand – trombone ("Sideshow")
- Hande Erdem – violin ("Thin Air")
- Theresa Wong – cello ("Thin Air")

=== Recording and production ===
- "Nowhere" recorded September – October 2000 at Guerrilla Recordings, Oakland, California by Myles Boisen
- "Sideshow" recorded January – February 2001 at Guerrilla Recordings by Myles Boisen
- "Thin Air" recorded May 2007 at Guerrilla Recordings by Myles Boisen
- Mixed 2008 at Guerrilla Recordings by Myles Boisen
