= Prints (album) =

Studio album by Fred Frith
- Released: November 2002
- Recorded: 1987–2001
- Genres: Experimental rock; free improvisation
- Length: 41:36
- Label: Fred (UK)
- Producer: Fred Frith

Fred Frith chronology
| Accidental (2002) | Prints (2002) | All Is Bright, But It Is Not Day (2002) |

Prints: Snapshots, Postcards, Messages and Miniatures, 1987–2001 is a 2002 album by English guitarist, composer and improvisor Fred Frith, and his first album of songs since Cheap at Half the Price (1983). It comprises four tracks taken from previously released compilations that Frith had contributed to between 1987 and 1997, seven tracks that were "created spontaneously" in the studio in 1997 and 2001, and one live guitar improvisation in 2001. The album was released on CD in November 2002 on Fred Records and was the second release in Frith's archival release program on the record label.

== Content ==
=== Compilation tracks ===
"Trains & Boats & Planes" and "The Ballad of Melody Nelson" are two cover songs Frith recorded for the Tzadik tribute CDs, Great Jewish Music: Burt Bacharach (1997) and Great Jewish Music: Serge Gainsbourg (1997) respectively. "The Ballad of Melody Nelson (La Ballade de Melody Nelson)" is about Gainsbourg's fictional character, Melody Nelson, and is sung by Frith in the original French. "Life of a Detective" was recorded with the 5uu's in 1990 and appeared on Place of General Happiness (1993). "True Love" was recorded in 1987 and was released on a Shimmy Disc compilation, The 20th Anniversary of the Summer of Love (1987) and then later included as one of the bonus tracks on the 1991 CD edition of Frith's solo album, Cheap at Half the Price.

=== Improvisations ===
The tracks "Stones", "Fingerprints", "Trocosi", "Levity", "I Want it to be Over" and "In the Winter of '64" were recorded for a WDR radio production by Alexander Schuhmacher in January 1997. Frith explained how the pieces were created:

The aim of the program was to explore the nature of improvisation. I was supposed to create pieces spontaneously, using my choices from a long list of sampled fragments which I heard only after arriving in the studio. The texts were derived from whatever was in the newspapers on the day of the recording. All these songs were composed and constructed directly onto tape without preparation.

"Reduce Me" was recorded four years later using the same approach described above. "Spot" was a live guitar improvisation by Frith recorded in July 2001 where he used a live sampler to dynamically capture and loop guitar sounds.

== Reception ==
Professional ratings
Review scores
| Source | Rating |
|---|---|
| AllMusic | 4/5 stars |
| Leonardo | Favourable |

In a review of Prints for AllMusic, François Couture described it as "a very fine album, ... truly enjoyable", and "much friendlier to the listener" than Frith's Cheap at Half the Price, which Couture in turn called "the best tongue-in-cheek take at the New Wave". He said Prints is "[h]ighly recommended", adding that the improviser's "humor and pop sensibility" contributes to its success.

In the MIT Press journal, Leonardo, Stefaan van Ryssen wrote that the recording process of Prints give the tracks an "immediacy and urgency". He described "Stones" as a waltz, "limping as if hit in the leg by a bullet", and "I Want it to be Over" as a "miniature drama" with improvisation that is "top class". Van Ryssen said the pieces are deceptively simple, but repeated listening reveals that the relationship between the samples and instruments is "subtle and never obvious", and they leave one "[in] awe at what a master improviser can do in real time".

== Track listing ==
All tracks composed by Fred Frith excepted where noted.

| No. | Title | Length |
|---|---|---|
| 1. | "Trains & Boats & Planes" (Burt Bacharach, Hal David) | 5:07 |
| 2. | "Stones" | 2:02 |
| 3. | "Fingerprints" | 3:50 |
| 4. | "Life of a Detective" (Fred Frith, Earnest Noyes Brookings) | 3:13 |
| 5. | "The Ballad of Melody Nelson" (Serge Gainsbourg) | 2:01 |
| 6. | "Trocosi" | 4:36 |
| 7. | "Reduce Me" | 5:48 |
| 8. | "Levity" | 2:36 |
| 9. | "True Love" | 2:56 |
| 10. | "I Want it to be Over" | 3:01 |
| 11. | "Spot" | 4:38 |
| 12. | "In the Winter of '64" | 1:48 |

=== Track notes ===
1. From Great Jewish Music: Burt Bacharach (1997, Tzadik)
  - Recorded at Jankowski Studio, Esslingen, Germany, 1996
2. Recorded at Jankowski Studio, Esslingen, Germany, January 1997
  - Text: International Herald Tribune, 27/01/97, "Palestinian independence celebrations in Hebron"
  - Sample: "Ligueyou Ndeye" by Doudou N'Diaye Rose
3. Recorded at Jankowski Studio, Esslingen, Germany, January 1997
4. From Place of General Happiness (1993, Modern Variety Music)
  - Recorded at Triple Helix, Denver, Colorado, 1990 (engineer: Bob Drake)
5. From Great Jewish Music: Serge Gainsbourg (1997, Tzadik)
  - Recorded at Jankowski Studio, Esslingen, Germany, 1997
6. Recorded at Jankowski Studio, Esslingen, Germany, January 1997
  - Text: International Herald Tribune, 28/01/97, "Enslavement of women in Ghana"
  - Sample: "Where Do You Want to Go" by Kahil El'Zabar
7. Recorded at Jankowski Studio, Esslingen, Germany, 2001
  - Text: The Guardian, July 2001, "Afghan woman returns home after ten years of exile"
8. Recorded at Jankowski Studio, Esslingen, Germany, January 1997
  - Sample: "Kattajait" from Inuit Games and Songs (UNESCO Collection)
  - Sample: applause for Helmut Kohl speech, Brandenburg Gate, Berlin
9. From The 20th Anniversary of the Summer of Love (1987, Shimmy Disc)
  - Recorded at Noise, New York City, 1987 (engineer: Mark Kramer)
10. Recorded at Jankowski Studio, Esslingen, Germany, January 1997
  - Text: International Herald Tribune, 27/01/97, "Bill Clinton interviewed about Monica Lewinsky"
  - Samples: Escher-loop, broken glass
11. Recorded at Jankowski Studio, Esslingen, Germany, July 2001
12. Recorded at Jankowski Studio, Esslingen, Germany, January 1997

== Personnel ==
- Fred Frith – all instruments (except those listed below), voice
- Bernd "Lönsch" Lehmann (2,3) – clarinet, tenor saxophone
- Mike Johnson (4) – principal voice
- Dave Kerman (4) – backup voice
- Sebastian Gramms (6) – acoustic bass
- Alexandra Schulz (7) – additional voice
- Sheena Dupuis (9) – backing vocal

=== Sound and artwork ===
- Re-mixed, re-constructed and compiled at Jankowski Studio, Esslingen, Germany, by Peter Hardt and Fred Frith, July 2001
- CD cover design by Tomas Kurth
- Polaroid photograph by Heike Liss
