= Theresa Wong =

American cellist

Theresa Wong (born March 31, 1976) is an American cellist, vocalist, composer and improviser in the field of experimental music. She lives and works in the San Francisco Bay Area.

== Early life and education ==
She was born in Schenectady, New York, United States. Wong studied classical piano and cello in her early years and attended Stanford University, where she completed a B.S. in product design. After studies in graphic design at the University of Applied Arts in Vienna, and a one year fellowship in design at Benetton Group's Fabrica research centre in Treviso, Italy, she returned to the Bay Area and completed a Master of Fine Arts at Mills College, studying with Fred Frith, Joan Jeanrenaud, Alvin Curran, Joëlle Léandre and Annie Gosfield.

== Work ==
Her debut album, The Unlearning, was released on Tzadik Records in September 2011. This work is a collection of 21 songs inspired by Francisco Goya's The Disasters of War etchings, and is performed by Wong on cello and voice and Carla Kihlstedt on violin and voice. Her other works include O Sleep, an improvised opera premiered at Southern Exposure, which she directed and presented with an ensemble of eight performers, Call It Culture, a cello duo written for Joan Jeanrenaud, Meet Me At The Future Garden, for two voices and eight intonarumori, performed at the Yerba Buena Center for the Arts with the Magik*Magik Orchestra commissioned for Performa 09's Music for 16 Futurist Noise Intoners, and Xenoglossia, a piece for live and pre-recorded voice composed as a soundtrack to conceptual artist Jonathon Keats' travel documentary for plants, Strange Skies presented at the Berkeley Art Museum.

Wong has performed throughout the United States and internationally with artists including Fred Frith, Joëlle Léandre, Rova Saxophone Quartet, Vinny Golia, Ellen Fullman, Carla Kihlstedt, Anna Halprin and Luciano Chessa. She also appears in Peter Esmonde’s documentary on Ellen Fullman, 5 Variations on a Long String (2010).

== Discography ==
- 2007 The Happy End Problem – Music for Dance by Fred Frith (Fred Records)
- 2007 Luggage – with Bob Marsh (Last Visible Dog)
- 2007 The Mirror World – ROVA Saxophone Quartet (Metalanguage)
- 2007 Bolivar Zoar – with Ava Mendoza and Maryclare Brzytwa (Self release)
- 2008 Earth Music, Ten Years of Meridian Music – Nightwatching, for solo cello and voice (Innova)
- 2009 Nowhere, Sideshow, Thin Air – Music for Dance by Fred Frith (Fred Records)
- 2009 Vanity – with Große Abfahrt (Emanem)
- 2009 The Harmonic Series, A Compilation of Works in Just Intonation – duo with Ellen Fullman (Important Records)
- 2010 The Headlands – Barn Owl and the Infinite String Ensemble (Important Records)
- 2011 jimpani kustakwa ka jankwariteecheri – Estamos Ensemble (Edgetone Records)
- 2011 Through Glass Panes – compositions by Ellen Fullman (Important Records)
- 2011 The Unlearning, 21 songs for violin, cello and 2 voices (Tzadik)
- 2015 Quintillions Green – improvisations with Fred Frith and John Butcher (Otoroku)
- 2014 Venice Is A Fish, songs for voice, cello, prepared piano and tonkori (Sensitive Skin / Euphorbia)
- 2016 Layered Events, improvisations with Søren Kjærgaard (Important Records)
- 2018 Crossing A River By Rope – improvisations with Lao Dan, Deng Boyu, Li Xing and John McCowen (fo'c'sle)
- 2020 Some Center – compositions by Chris Brown (New World Records)
- 2020 Live at zoom-in, improvisations with Frantz Loriot (Creative Sources)
- 2020 Harbors – duo for long string instrument, cello and electronics with Ellen Fullman (room40)
- 2022 Practicing Sands – solo works for cello and voice (fo'c'sle)
- 2025 Journey to the Cave of Guanyin – works for solo and multitracked cello (room40)
