= Late Works =

Studio album by John Zorn & Fred Frith
- Released: April 2010
- Recorded: October 16, 2009
- Studio: East Side Sound, New York City
- Genre: Avant-rock; avant-jazz; free improvisation
- Length: 50:24
- Label: Tzadik TZ 7634
- Producer: John Zorn and Fred Frith

John Zorn & Fred Frith chronology
| The Art of Memory II (2008) | Late Works (2010) |

John Zorn chronology
| Ipos: Book of Angels Volume 14 (2010) | Late Works (2010) | Baal: Book of Angels Volume 15 (2010) |

Fred Frith chronology
| Nowhere, Sideshow, Thin Air (2009) | Late Works (2010) | Eye to Ear III (2010) |

Late Works is a studio album by John Zorn and Fred Frith. It is the fourth collaborative album by the duo, and their first studio album. It was recorded at East Side Sound in New York City on October 16, 2009, and was released by Tzadik Records in April 2010.

The album consists of improvised music by Zorn and Frith that was recorded in the studio in real time with no edits or overdubs.

== Reception ==
Professional ratings
Review scores
| Source | Rating |
|---|---|
| AllMusic | 4/5 stars |

AllMusic said in a review of Late Works: "Free improv isn't for everyone (listeners or performers), but it doesn't get much better than this."

== Track listing ==
All tracks by John Zorn and Fred Frith.

1. "Foetid Ceremony" – 5:34
2. "Mosquito Slats" – 2:09
3. "Horse Rehab" – 5:43
4. "Legend of the Small" – 2:17
5. "Baffled Hats" – 3:20
6. "Movement of Harried Angels" – 7:29
7. "The Fourth Mind" – 9:40
8. "Creature Comforts" – 3:11
9. "Slow Lattice" – 5:58
10. "Ankle Time" – 5:03

== Personnel ==
- John Zorn – alto saxophone
- Fred Frith – electric guitar

== Sound ==
- Marc Urselli – engineer, audio mixer
- John Zorn and Fred Frith – producers
