= Impur (album) =

Live album by Fred Frith
- Released: 2006
- Recorded: 30 May 1996
- Venues: L’Ecole Nationale de Musique, Villeurbanne, France
- Genres: Chamber music; experimental rock; free improvisation
- Length: 54:56
- Label: Fred (UK)
- Producer: Fred Frith

Fred Frith chronology
Ironic Universe (2006)	Impur (2006)	The Happy End Problem (2006)

Impur is an album by English guitarist, composer and improvisor Fred Frith. It was composed in 1996 by Frith "for 100 musicians, large building and mobile audience" and was performed on 30 May 1996 by students and teachers from L’Ecole Nationale de Musique, Villeurbanne, France. Frith directed the performance but did perform himself.

Impur is the first of two performances commissioned by L’Ecole Nationale de Musique while Frith was resident music professor at the institution. The second was Impur II (2009).

== Background ==
Between 1994 and 1996, Frith was Composer-in-Residence at L’Ecole Nationale de Musique in Villeurbanne, France. At the end of the two-year residency, Frith organised a musical event at the school involving as many students as possible. He grouped them according to their music disciplines and placed them in all the rooms of a music building. Each group of musicians then played music Frith had prepared for them or, when required, improvised. Using synchronized stopwatches, all the groups, who could not hear each other, played strictly according to a 55-minute time-score that Frith had written. During the concert the public was invited to wander from room to room, or sit in the courtyard and listen to the sounds from the open windows. The whole performance was recorded on four ADAT recorders and later mixed.

Downtown Music Gallery wrote of this album:

There are moments of chaos yet there is a constant thread that seems to hold it together and help things navigate through the more dense sections. What amazes me are those unexpected sections when certain events take place and it seems as if some large hand has reached out and molded a specific segment of the wave of sounds. Those magical moments appear when you least expect them.

== Track listing ==
1. "Impur" (Frith) – 54:56

== Personnel ==
=== Directors ===
- Fred Frith – chamber orchestra section
- Sophie Dufeutrelle – flutes section
- Catherine Guinamard – recorders section
- Pascal Pariaud – clarinets section
- Nasser Saïdani – African percussion section
- David Wood – Ensemble Hétéroclite

=== Performers ===
- Samuel Chagnard – soprano saxophone, bass clarinet
- Alain Chaléard – tabla
- Patrick Charbonnier – trombone
- Laurent Frick – trumpet
- Bader Gharzouli – electric guitar
- Stephane Grosjean – percussion
- Joël Jorda – clarinet
- Ghilem Lacroux – electric guitar
- Stéphane Lambert – alto saxophone
- Gilles Laval – electric guitar
- Catherine Leuchter – recorder
- Laure Michel – recorder
- Claire Mollard – percussion
- Guillaume Quemener – electric guitar
- Franklin Riboud – electric guitar
- Fatiha Semaïl – recorder
- Laurent Vichard – clarinet
- Denis Mariotte – drums
- Jean-Michel Quoisse – bass guitar

=== Engineers ===
- Myles Boisen – mastering
- Peter Hardt – mixing
- Emmanuel Gilot – recording
- Laurent Luci – recording assistant
