= 50th Birthday Celebration Volume Five =

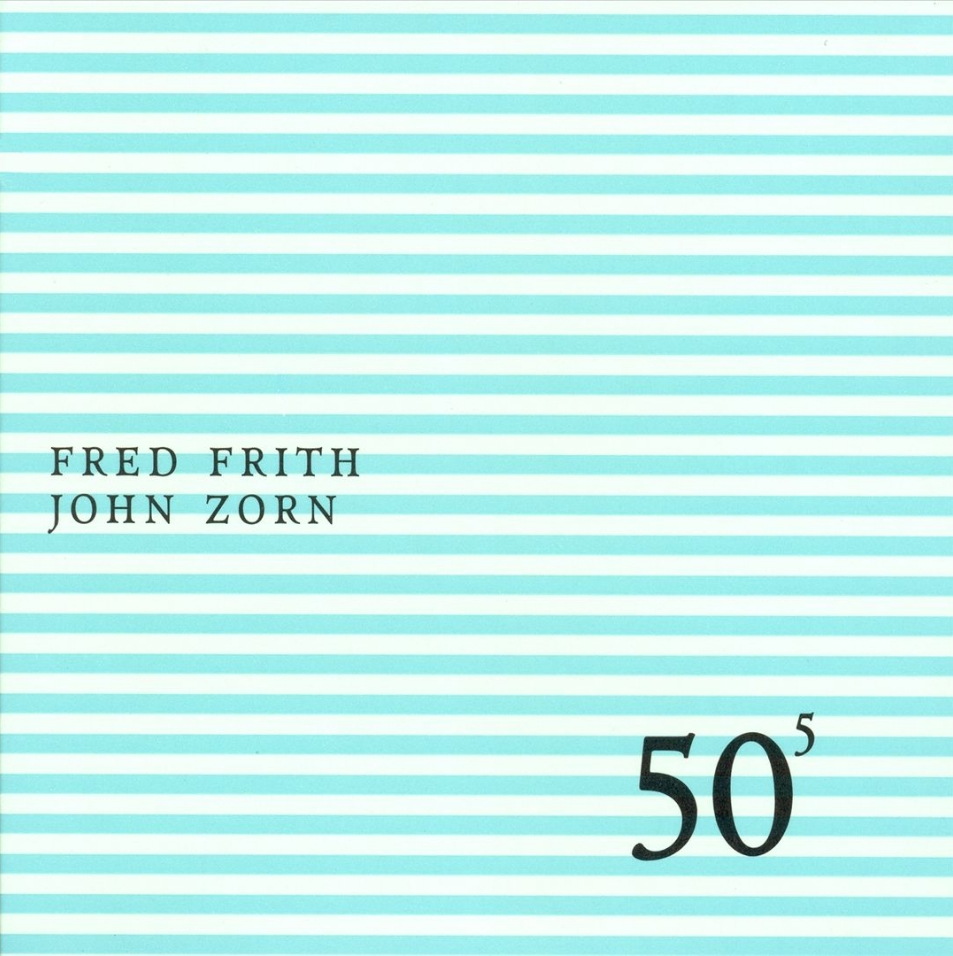

Live album by John Zorn and Fred Frith
- Released: June 29, 2004
- Recorded: September 15, 2003
- Venue: Tonic, New York City
- Genre: Downtown music Avant-garde jazz
- Length: 44:53
- Label: Tzadik TZ 5005
- Producer: John Zorn

John Zorn and Fred Frith chronology
The Art of Memory (1994)	50th Birthday Celebration Volume Five (2004)	The Art of Memory II (2008)

John Zorn chronology
Masada Recital (2004)	50th Birthday Celebration Volume Five (2004)	50th Birthday Celebration Volume 6 (2004)

Fred Frith chronology
What Leave Behind (2004)	50th Birthday Celebration Volume Five (2004)	Eleventh Hour (2005)

50th Birthday Celebration Volume Five is a live album of improvised music by Fred Frith and John Zorn documenting their performance at Tonic in September 2003 as part of Zorn's month-long 50th Birthday Celebration concert series.

== Reception ==
The Allmusic review by Sean Westergaard awarded the album 4 stars stating "The interplay is simply amazing. Much of it is what you'd expect from free improv, but there are a handful of beautiful, lyrical moments, like those that close the set. Any fan of free improvisation will be thrilled. It doesn't get much better than this."

Professional ratings
Review scores
Source	Rating
Allmusic	4/5 stars

== Track listing ==
All tracks are written by John Zorn and Fred Frith.

No.	Title	Length
1.	"Off Topic"	7:29
2.	"Alecto"	3:56
3.	"Sowers of Discord"	3:54
4.	"Four Corners"	8:14
5.	"Level Six Jumping"	4:33
6.	"Cruel Abstraction"	6:25
7.	"Eumenides Outside the Window"	6:54
8.	"Nine-part Invention"	4:37
9.	"Cord Trouble and Tuning"	1:38
10.	"Astrologers and Magicians"	6:31

- Recorded live at Tonic in New York City on September 15, 2003

== Personnel ==
- John Zorn – alto saxophone
- Fred Frith – guitars
