= Eye to Ear =

Studio album by Fred Frith
- Released: 1997
- Recorded: 1992, 1995, Germany; 1994, 1995, United States
- Genre: Experimental rock
- Length: 55:42
- Label: Tzadik (US)
- Producer: Fred Frith

Fred Frith chronology
| Allies (1996) | Eye to Ear (1997) | The Previous Evening (1997) |

Music for Film series chronology
| Middle of the Moment (1995) | Eye to Ear (1997) | Rivers and Tides (2003) |

Professional ratings
Review scores
| Source | Rating |
|---|---|
| AllMusic | 3/5 stars |

Eye to Ear is a studio album by English guitarist, composer and improvisor Fred Frith. It is a collection of film and theatre music composed and performed by Frith, and was recorded in Germany and the United States between 1992 and 1995. Eye to Ear was Frith's first solo album to be released on John Zorn's Tzadik label.

Two more collections of film and theatre music by Frith in this series, Eye to Ear II and Eye to Ear III were released by Tzadik Records in 2004 and 2010 respectively.

== Track listing ==
All tracks composed by Fred Frith.

| No. | Title | Length |
|---|---|---|
| 1. | "Le Rencontre (Title Theme)" | 4:11 |
| 2. | "Backroom" | 3:22 |
| 3. | "Thea und Nat": "Welcome Home"; "Suspicion Theme (for Bernard Herrmann)"; "Thea's Theme"; "Suspicion Theme II"; "Not Drowning But Waving" | 12:22 |
| 4. | "Backroom II" |
| 5. | "Picture of Light" | 9:47 |
| 6. | "Ostkreuz": "Frozen Landscape"; "Dragging Half a Pig"; "Driving to Grandma's"; "In the Abandoned Building" | 6:00 |
| 7. | "Before Sunrise – In the Train" | 2:47 |
| 8. | "Backroom III" | 8:07 |
| 9. | "Le Rencontre (Reprise)" | 3:36 |

== Personnel ==
- Fred Frith – all instruments (except those listed below), tape manipulations
- Michaela Dietl – accordion (3,6)
- Tilmann Müller – trumpet (3,6)
- Christian Kaya – clarinet (3)
- Boris Denker – tenor saxophone (1,9)
- Willy Webster – organ (2,4,7)

=== Sound ===
- Tracks 1, 3, 6 and 9 recorded by Beno Gordon at Sound Fabrik, Munich, Germany, 1992
- Tracks 2, 4, 5 and 7 recorded by Olivier Dicicco at Mobius Studio, San Francisco, United States, 1994–1995
- Track 8 recorded by Peter Hardt at Jankowski Studio, Stuttgart, Germany, 1995
