= Propaganda (Fred Frith album) =

Studio album by Fred Frith
- Released: November 2015
- Recorded: April 1987
- Studio: Noise New York
- Genre: Experimental music
- Length: 35:31
- Label: Fred (UK)
- Producer: Fred Frith

Fred Frith chronology
Field Days (The Amanda Loops) (2015)	Propaganda (2015)	Storytelling (2017)

Music for Dance series chronology
Field Days (The Amanda Loops) (2015)	Propaganda (2015)

Propaganda is a studio album by English guitarist, composer and improvisor Fred Frith. It comprises 21 pieces for dance written by Frith and commissioned by Matthew Maguire for the Creation Production Company. It was first performed at La Mama ETC in New York City in May 1987. The suite was recorded by Kramer at Noise New York in April 1987 and released on Side 4 of the LP release of Frith's 1988 solo album, The Technology of Tears. It was omitted from the CD releases of the album.

The Propaganda suite was reworked and remastered in February 2015 by Myles Boisen, and was released by Fred Records in November 2015.

== Track listing ==
All tracks composed by Fred Frith.

No.	Title	Length
1.	"Shelter For Them All"	1:37
2.	"A Deeper Understanding of Conflict"	4:22
3.	"The Hounds of Democracy"	1:19
4.	"The Turning of an Hourglass"	2:02
5.	"Birth of a Rebel"	2:46
6.	"I Am in Control"	0:23
7.	"Your Beautiful Corpse"	1:25
8.	"The Excellent Hyena"	2:19
9.	"Nuns Don't Run Roadblocks"	0:37
10.	"The Old Man Moves a Mountain"	1:17
11.	"The Wolf Demon (Part 1)"	1:06
12.	"Known Knowns and Unknowns"	0:35
13.	"Meditation Upon Propaganda"	3:13
14.	"Liberty"	1:56
15.	"Weakness is Provocative"	0:33
16.	"Saracene and Antonio"	1:03
17.	"The Relentless Landscape"	1:20
18.	"The Gaze That Sings"	1:33
19.	"Stopping Short of Torture"	1:40
20.	"The Wolf Demon (Part 2)"	0:58
21.	"Rashomon"	3:35

Sources: AllMusic, Discogs, SquidCo

== Personnel ==
- Fred Frith – all instruments, voice

Sources: Discogs, SquidCo

=== Sound and artwork ===
Recorded at Noise New York, April 1987; Mastered at Headless Buddhna Mastering Labs, Oakland, California, February 2015.

- Kramer – recording engineer (1987)
- Myles Boisen – remastering (2015)
- Fred Frith – producer
- Nancy Campbell – photography
- Tom Kurth – cover design

Source: Discogs
