= Step Across the Border (soundtrack) =

Soundtrack album by Fred Frith
- Released: 1990
- Recorded: 1979–1989
- Genre: Avant-rock
- Length: 73:31
- Label: RecRec (Switzerland)
- Producer: Fred Frith

Fred Frith chronology
The Top of His Head (1989)	Step Across the Border (1990)	Attention Span (1990)

Music for Film series chronology
The Top of His Head (1989)	Step Across the Border (1990)	Middle of the Moment (1995)

Step Across the Border is a soundtrack double album by English guitarist, composer and improvisor Fred Frith, of the 1990 avant-garde documentary film on Frith, Step Across the Border, written and directed by Nicolas Humbert and Werner Penzel. The album features music from the film performed by Frith and other musicians, and covers ten years of Frith's musical career from 1979 to 1989.

== Music ==
Step Across the Border is more than a just a soundtrack. It includes additional tracks, for example, "Drum Factory" and "Candy Machine", that were written for the album by Frith from ambient sounds in the film. Discussing the album, Frith said:

It struck me as not very interesting just to take what was exactly in the film and stick it on a CD and put it out as a soundtrack. Apart from anything else, the function, when you listen with the image and when you listen without the image, is very, very different. One of the things I particularly enjoyed doing was taking raw sound from locations during the film, like the candy machine, and writing pieces of music to go with them, which is totally unnecessary within the context of the film, because they have their own logic ... In the film, the candy machine is there, and you hear the noise it makes but the image was so strong that there was no need to do anything with it. On the record there was no point of sticking the sound of a machine on there, because it wouldn't mean very much.

The album also includes live music as performed in the film, for example "Houston St"; tracks from other albums that accompany scenes in the film, for example "Too Much Too Little"; and tracks from other albums that replace live covers of those tracks performed in the film, for example "Legs".

== Reception ==
Professional ratings
Review scores
Source	Rating
AllMusic	4/5 stars

In a review for AllMusic, Rick Anderson described Step Across the Border as an "excellent overview" of Frith's work. He said the music on the album ranges from "tuneful and charming to stark and forbidding", and was particularly pleased with the material from Massacre's (then out-of-print) first album. Anderson rated Step Across the Border "highly recommended".

Reviewing the album in Leonardo, Stefaan Van Ryssen noted that Step Across the Border is more than a soundtrack: Frith "creates a narrative structure that parallels and complements the [film]". Van Ryssen said this narrative structure is the album's strength, but also its weakness. He described the tracks as "nice but anecdotal patches" that "lack scope and meaning in [themselves]" until they are "stitched together by an invisible ... thread" to build a story. But the listener is not given the means to easily recreate the story, which Van Ryssen felt, may make it difficult to fully appreciate the music.

== Track listing ==
All tracks composed by Fred Frith except where stated.

Side A
No.	Title	Length
1.	"Sparrow Song"	1:28
2.	"Voice of America (part 3)" (Frith, Bob Ostertag) / "Legs" (Frith, Bill Laswell, Fred Maher)	4:24
3.	"Selluloid Restaurant" / "The Old Man Puts Out the Fire"	3:09
4.	"After Dinner" (Haco)	1:47
5.	"Houston St" (Frith, John Zorn)	2:54
6.	"Drum Factory"	2:01
7.	"Regardless of Rain" (Frith, Tom Cora)	3:05

Side B
No.	Title	Length
8.	"Candy Machine"	2:59
9.	"Romanisches Café"	6:19
10.	"The Border" (Frith, Anne Hemenway)	3:29
11.	"Nirvana Again"	1:53
12.	"Scottish Roppongi"	1:46

Side C
No.	Title	Length
13.	"Norrgården Nyvla"	2:58
14.	"Birds" (Frith, Tim Hodgkinson)	2:18
15.	"The As Usual Dance Towards the Other Flight to What is Not (part 3)"	1:47
16.	"Williamsburg Bridge"	1:53
17.	"Same Old Me" / "Williamsburg Bridge (reprise)"	4:10
18.	"The As Usual Dance Towards the Other Flight to What is Not (part 5)"	2:24
19.	"Lost and Found"	3:21

Side D
No.	Title	Length
20.	"Nine by Nine" (Frith, Eitetsu Hayashi)	5:52
21.	"Evolution"	3:20
22.	"Union Square"	1:41
23.	"Morning Song" (Iva Bittová, Pavel Fajt, Pitinsky)	2:00
24.	"Voice of America (part 4)" (Frith, Ostertag)	2:02
25.	"Too Much Too Little" (Frith, Tina Curran)	2:08
26.	"Too Late"	2:23

== Personnel ==
The numbers below indicate the tracks on which the musicians played.

- Fred Frith (1–3, 5–22, 24–26) – guitar, violin, bass guitar, DX7, Casio, percussion, bottles, home-made instruments, voice
- Tom Cora (1, 7, 10) – cello, drum, voice
- Zeena Parkins (1, 10) – keyboards, drum, voice
- Bob Ostertag (2a, 11, 24) – Serge synthesizer, tapes, samples
- Bill Laswell (2b, 17a) – bass guitar
- Fred Maher (2b, 17a) – drums
- Haco (4) – piano, voice
- John Zorn (5) – alto saxophone
- Jean Derome (11) – alto saxophone
- René Lussier (11) – bass guitar
- Kevin Norton (11) – drums
- Eino Haapala (13) – guitar
- Lars Hollmer (13) – keyboards
- Hans Bruniusson (13, 21) – drums
- Tim Hodgkinson (14) – bass clarinet
- Iva Bittová (19, 23) – violin, voice
- Pavel Fajt (19, 23) – beer cans, guitar, voice
- Eitetsu Hayashi (20) – taiko
- Tina Curran (25) – bass guitar

== Recording details ==
- Tracks 1, 10 – recorded by Tim Hodgkinson at Sunrise, Kirchberg, Switzerland, December 1985
- Tracks 2a, 24 – recorded live at PASS, New York City, January 1981
- Track 2b – recorded by Martin Bisi at OAO Studio, New York, June 1981
- Tracks 3a, 4 – recorded by Yasushi Utsunomiyaat at MUE Studio, Osaka, Japan, February 1988
- Tracks 2a, 3b, 6, 8, 12, 15, 16, 17b, 18, 22, 24, 26 – recorded by Rainer Carben at Bavaria TV Studios in Munich, Germany, December 1989
- Tracks 5, 7 – recorded live at The Kitchen, New York City, February 1989
- Tracks 9, 12 – recorded live at the Romanisches Café, Tokyo, Japan, February 1988
- Track 11 – recorded live in rehearsal at Roulette, New York City, February 1988
- Track 13 – recorded at Chickenhouse, Uppsala, Sweden and Sunrise, Kirchberg, Switzerland, July 1979
- Tracks 14, 20, 22 – recorded live at ROX, Tokyo, Japan, February 1988
- Track 14 – recorded at Hodgkinson's home in Yorkshire and Brixton, England, December 1988
- Tracks 17a, 21, 25 – recorded in Frith's apartment in New York City, August 1983
- Track 19 – recorded by Rudolf Oleschko in Provence, France and Paosostraße, Munich, Germany, July 1989
- Tracks 23 – recorded at a hotel room, Bern, Switzerland March 1989

=== Tracks from other albums ===
- Track 1 – from Skeleton Crew's contribution to the Island of Sanity compilation (1986)
- Tracks 2a, 24 – from Fred Frith, Bob Ostertag and Phil Minton's LP Voice of America (1982)
- Track 2b – from Massacre's LP Killing Time (1981)
- Track 10 – from Skeleton Crew's LP The Country of Blinds (1986)
- Track 13 – from Fred Frith's LP Gravity (1980)
- Tracks 17a, 21, 25 – from Fred Frith's LP Cheap at Half the Price (1983)

== CD reissues ==
- In 1991 East Side Digital Records and RecRec Music re-issued Step Across the Border on CD.
- In 2003 Fred Records released a remastered version of Step Across the Border on CD.

== See also ==
- Cut Up the Border
