= Impur II =

Live album by Fred Frith
- Released: September 2009
- Recorded: 20 December 1997
- Venue: RamDam, Lyon, France
- Genre: Experimental music
- Length: 43:42
- Label: Fred (UK)
- Producer: Fred Frith

Fred Frith chronology
The Big Picture (2009)	Impur II (2009)	Nowhere, Sideshow, Thin Air (2009)

Impur II is an album by English guitarist, composer and improvisor Fred Frith. It was composed in 1996 by Frith and performed in December 1997 in RamDam in Lyon, France, by students and teachers from L’Ecole Nationale de Musique, Villeurbanne. Frith conducted and played with the ensemble.

Impur II is the second of two performances commissioned by L’Ecole Nationale de Musique while Frith was resident music professor at the institution. The first was Impur (2006), which was performed simultaneously by students in different rooms of a building. Frith did not play on that album. Impur II was an unannounced concert that took place in the school hall – it started with no audience and continued as people discovered it and began filling the room.

== Track listing ==
All tracks composed and conducted by Fred Frith.

1. "Invitation/Invocation" – 6:41
2. "Affront National" – 3:27
3. "Dead Sea" – 4:07
4. "Waiting ror God" – 1:55
5. "Danses Avec Les Rats" – 3:32
6. "Nueve" – 1:40
7. "Now We Know" – 2:16
8. "Gaga-Kun" – 1:53
9. "Don't Say" – 1:16
10. "Cuts Up" – 1:18
11. "Le Sursis" – 4:04
12. "Ses Habits De Dimanche" – 4:48
13. "Finger on the Pulse" – 2:26
14. "La Dernière Valse (Pour Mie)" – 4:19

== Personnel ==
- Fred Frith – composition, conductor, guitar solo
- Jean-Michel Quoisse – bass guitar
- Stephen Tissot – violin
- Denis Mariotte – drums, melodica
- Claire Mollard – marimba, percussion
- Stephane Grosjean – marimba, percussion
- Cyril Cambon – marimba, percussion
- Philippe Madile – piano, synthesizer
- Gilles Laval – electric guitar
- Guillaume Quemener – electric guitar
- Ghilem Lacroux – electric guitar
- Bader Gharzouli – electric guitar
- Laurent Frick – trumpet
- Stephane Lambert – baritone sax, shenai
- Pascal Pariaud – clarinet
- Laurent Vichard – clarinet
- Joel Jorda – clarinet
- Serge Sana – klaviers, echantillonage
- Samuel Chagnard – soprano sax

=== Recording ===
- Recorded in concert at RamDam, Lyon, France on 20 December 1997 by Emmanuel Gilot
