= Cheap at Half the Price =

Studio album by Fred Frith
- Released: 1983
- Recorded: August 1983, New York City
- Genre: Avant-rock; experimental
- Length: 38:29
- Label: Ralph (US)
- Producer: Fred Frith

Fred Frith chronology
| Voice of America (1982) | Cheap at Half the Price (1983) | Live in Prague and Washington (1983) |

Cheap at Half the Price is a 1983 solo album by English guitarist, composer and improviser Fred Frith. It was Frith's fifth solo album, and was originally released in the United States on LP record on the Residents' Ralph record label. It was the third of three solo albums Frith made for the label.

Cheap at Half the Price was recorded by Frith at his home in New York City on a 4-track machine. He played all the instruments himself, with the exception of bass guitar on two tracks, and drums, for which he used tapes and samples previously recorded by other drummers. The record differed from Frith's previous experimental albums in that it consisted largely of pop-like songs, and he sang for the first time.

The LP's release in 1983 caused a stir in progressive circles because of its "apparent simplicity" and its departure from the experimental music Frith had become known for. A remastered version of the album released on CD in 2004 was better received by critics, who admitted that they had overlooked what Frith had been doing at the time.

== Background and recording ==
Cheap at Half the Price was the third in a series of three solo albums Frith made for the Residents' record label, Ralph Records, the first being Gravity (1980), an avant-garde "dance" record that drew on rhythm and dance from folk music across the world, and the second being Speechless (1981), a mixture of folk music, free improvisation, avant-rock and noise. He had recorded with the Residents in the late 1970s and early 1980s, and appeared on several of their albums. Both Gravity and Speechless were well received by critics.

Cheap at Half the Price was Frith's first album of songs on which he sang. In an interview with Nicole V. Gagné, Frith said that prior to Henry Cow, he used to often sing in folk clubs and in a blues band at university, although he admits "I should think it was pretty dreadful". In the early days of Henry Cow, Frith wrote several songs for the group and sang, but it was decided that his "singing was no longer acceptable". It was not until Frith and Tom Cora formed Skeleton Crew in 1982 that Frith tried his hand at singing again, although initially it was "just shouting", something he had picked up from watching punk groups in 1977. As he grew more confident with his voice, he began more "melodic singing". Frith started work on Cheap at Half the Price in August 1983.

Frith recorded Cheap at Half the Price at his home in New York City on a 4-track machine. Unlike his two previous albums for Ralph Records, where he used backing bands, on this album Frith played all the instruments himself, with the exception of bass guitar on two tracks, and drums. Bill Laswell from Frith's band Massacre played bass on "Same Old Me", and Tina Curran played bass on "Too Much, Too Little". For the drumming Frith used samples that had been previously recorded of drummers he had worked with, namely Frank Wuyts of Aksak Maboul, Fred Maher from Massacre, Paul Sears of the Muffins, and Hans Bruniusson from Samla Mammas Manna.

== Composition ==
Cheap at Half the Price differed from Frith's previous experimental albums in that it featured a collection of short songs and instrumentals in a "tongue-in-cheek pop vein". He also played a "cheap" Casio-101 on all the tracks and sang for the first time. AllMusic described Frith's singing on the album as "strange[ly] high-pitched", and the songs as "pop-like ditties" with a "simple and repetitive" structure. Leonardo Digital Reviews said most of the tracks had a "happy-go-lucky" feel to them.

The lyrics on Cheap at Half the Price are politically oriented, set during US President Ronald Reagan's first term of office, with socialist commentaries on, amongst other things, dogs and insects. Despite Frith's apparent departure from his previous progressive albums, some of the tracks on this album have ties to his earlier work. "Some Clouds Do" has a similar "driving rhythm" to Paul Sears' drumming on "What a Dilemma" on Gravity. "Absent Friends", a traditional Swedish melody arranged by Frith, has the same "fun and dance" feel that occurs at the end of "Don't Cry for Me", also on Gravity. "Absent Friends" is also the only track on Cheap at Half the Price that departs from the album's "pop vein".

In contrast to the high-pitched singing on most of the songs, "Same Old Me", one of the few "dark" tracks on the album, is a "gloomily introspective" song featuring some "rough lyrics" that have been slowed to a drawl over "angry riffing" and "relentless bass and percussion". Leonardo Digital Reviews said that this and many of the other songs on the album had a complex structure beneath the apparent "carefree and beaming surface".

== Reception and influence ==
Professional ratings
Review scores
| Source | Rating |
|---|---|
| AllMusic | 4/5 stars |
| Babyblaue Seiten | 11/15 stars |
| Leonardo Digital Reviews | favorable |

Followers of Frith's music generally had trouble coming to terms with Cheap at Half the Price. To them Frith was "progressive, genre-bending music's last great hope", and on this album he appeared to have abandoned this role. When the album was released on LP in 1983, Recommended Records, founded and run by Chris Cutler (Frith's band-mate from Henry Cow), elected not to stock it because Cutler felt it was not "terribly good". Trouser Press said that the quality of the record suffered from the lo-fi experiment of recording "at home on a 4-track".

In 1985 Michael Bloom of The Boston Phoenix wrote that Cheap at Half the Price "will never get the hearing it deserves". He said that Frith was trying to shake off this "progressive" mould he had been cast in, and believed that the songs on the album should be judged on their own merit and not as "rarefied art rock". One 1984 reviewer found the album "a very enjoyable recording", and stated that Frith's music "is changing the way many musicians look at the sounds that they take so seriously". The New Gibraltar Encyclopedia of Progressive Rock described Cheap at Half the Price as Frith's response to punk, a low-tech approach to performing songs. It called the album a "twisted pop" record, saying that it is "as uncompromising as everything else Frith recorded". François Couture in a review of Frith's 2002 album, Prints called Cheap at Half the Price "the best tongue-in-cheek take at the New Wave". Nicole V. Gagné wrote in her 1990 book, Sonic Transports: New Frontiers in Our Music that Cheap at Half the Price consists of "pretty much straight-ahead pop songs", but added that "they’re straight-ahead Frith pop songs, and that kind of contradiction in terms is precisely what the genre needs to bring it back to something approximating life."

Despite the criticism the LP received at the time of its release, the remastered CD issued 21 years later was generally well received. In the 2004 Recommended Records catalogue, Cutler wrote that the album had "raised eyebrows at the time (from, as Fred calls them 'progressive music snobs'—of which I guess I was one) for its apparent simplicity and departure from what was then thought of as Fred Style." René van Peer of Leonardo Digital Reviews admitted in 2005 that he was "one of those snobs" and wrote "I am astonished and embarrassed to find how little I grasped back then of what Frith had put into it." Looking at Frith's projects after Cheap at Half the Price made it clear that what he did on the album was not a departure from his musical experiments, as people saw it at the time, but rather a part of it. Van Peer said (in retrospect) that Cheap at Half the Price "bursts with inventiveness, and eradiates [sic] the irrepressible joy of playful creativity".

Frith's exploration of song forms on this album was later developed further with Tom Cora in Skeleton Crew, where Frith and Cora played "deceptively simple catchy songs", often using melodies derived from Scandinavian and Eastern European traditional music. Songs from Cheap at Half the Price appeared in several of Frith's later projects. Step Across the Border (1990), a film on Frith, and its accompanying soundtrack, featured three such songs, "Same Old Me", "Evolution" and "Too Much Too Little". Keep the Dog, a 1989–1991 Fred Frith review band, played a number of arrangements of songs from this album, including "Walking Song", "Some Clouds Do" and "Instant Party".

== Track listing ==
All tracks by Fred Frith, except where noted.

=== Original 1983 release ===
Side one
| No. | Title | Length |
|---|---|---|
| 1. | "Some Clouds Don't" | 3:12 |
| 2. | "Cap the Knife" | 2:47 |
| 3. | "Evolution" | 3:21 |
| 4. | "Too Much, Too Little" (Frith, Tina Curran) | 2:09 |
| 5. | "The Welcome" | 2:28 |
| 6. | "Same Old Me" | 2:58 |
| 7. | "Some Clouds Do" | 2:49 |

Side two
| No. | Title | Length |
|---|---|---|
| 8. | "Instant Party" | 1:53 |
| 9. | "Walking Song" | 3:13 |
| 10. | "Flying in the Face of Facts" | 2:38 |
| 11. | "Heart Bares" | 4:56 |
| 12. | "Absent Friends" (Frith/trad. Swedish) | 3:58 |
| 13. | "The Great Healer" | 2:07 |

=== 1991 CD release ===
| No. | Title | Length |
|---|---|---|
| 1. | "Some Clouds Don't" | 3:12 |
| 2. | "Cap the Knife" | 2:47 |
| 3. | "Evolution" | 3:21 |
| 4. | "Too Much, Too Little" (Frith, Tina Curran) | 2:09 |
| 5. | "True Love" (♯) | 2:58 |
| 6. | "The Welcome" | 2:28 |
| 7. | "Same Old Me" | 2:58 |
| 8. | "Some Clouds Do" | 2:49 |
| 9. | "Instant Party" | 1:53 |
| 10. | "Person To Person" (♯) | 2:20 |
| 11. | "Walking Song" | 3:13 |
| 12. | "Flying in the Face of Facts" | 2:38 |
| 13. | "Heart Bares" | 4:56 |
| 14. | "Absent Friends" (Frith/trad. Swedish) | 3:58 |
| 15. | "The Great Healer" | 2:07 |

♯ denotes bonus tracks

== Personnel ==
- Fred Frith – guitar, 6-string bass, Casio-101, violin, xylophone, homemade instruments, voice
- Frank Wuyts – drums
- Fred Maher – drums
- Paul Sears – drums
- Hans Bruniusson – drum samples
- Tina Curran – bass guitar ("Too Much, Too Little")
- Bill Laswell – bass guitar ("Same Old Me")
- Aksak Maboul – clapping ("Absent Friends")
- Sheena Dupuis – voice ("True Love")
- George Cartwright – alto saxophone ("Person To Person")

=== Recording and production ===
Recorded in August 1983 at Fred Frith's home in New York City by Frith on a 4-track recorder, except for "True Love" (recorded at Noise in New York City) and "Person To Person" (recorded at BC Studio in New York City).

- Fred Frith – engineer, producer (except "True Love", "Person To Person")
- Kramer – engineer ("True Love")
- Martin Bisi – engineer ("Person To Person")
- Paul Zinman – digital mastering
- Peter Bäder – album cover layout
- Busag, Zürich – album cover lithography
- Tina Curran – album cover photography

== CD reissues ==
In 1991 East Side Digital Records and RecRec Music re-issued Cheap at Half the Price on CD with two additional tracks by Frith: "True Love", from The 20th Anniversary of the Summer of Love (1987) by various artists; and "Person to Person", from North America (1985) by Curlew. In 2004 Fred Records, Frith's own record label and an imprint of Recommended Records, issued a remastered version on CD of the original Cheap at Half the Price LP with no extra tracks.
