= Live in Japan (Fred Frith album) =

Live album by Fred Frith
- Released: 1982
- Recorded: July 1981
- Venue: Tokyo, Osaka, Fukuoka, Maebashi
- Genre: Avant-rock; free improvisation
- Length: 68:34
- Label: Recommended (Japan)
- Producer: Fred Frith

Fred Frith chronology
Speechless (1981)	Live in Japan (1982)	Voice of America (1982)

Live in Japan, subtitled "The Guitars on the Table Approach", is a 1982 double live album by English guitarist, composer and improvisor Fred Frith. It was recorded during an improvised solo performance tour of Japan in July 1981. The double album was a limited edition release of 1,000 by Recommended Records Japan on two LP records in a black corrugated box containing posters, artwork and booklets in English and Japanese. It was also released as two single LPs, entitled Live in Japan, Vol. 1 and Live in Japan, Vol. 2. The single LP cover art was taken from the inner double LP gatefold cover.

== Background ==
On Live in Japan Frith continued his pioneering guitar work he began on his landmark 1974 album Guitar Solos. Comprising eight improvised pieces taken from four concerts in Tokyo, Osaka, Fukuoka and Maebashi in 1981, Frith used an old 1961 solid body Burns guitar, a homemade six- and eight-string double-neck guitar created by a friend Charles Fletcher, and a battered violin. The guitars were laid flat on a table and "played" by plucking, scraping and beating the strings with a variety of found objects. Frith also wore a WW II pilot's throat microphone to amplify his periodic vocal utterances. The same microphone had been used by Frith during some of the Massacre concerts held earlier in 1981.

On "Fukuoka 1" Frith scrubs his guitar strings with brushes, while on "Fukuoka 2" he wedges chopsticks between the strings and hits them so they oscillate back and forth, producing sounds that slowly decay. In "Maebashi 1" Frith pulls a chain through the strings; he also loops a wire through several strings, then, holding the wire upright, he plays it with a violin bow.

== Reception ==
Professional ratings
Review scores
Source	Rating
AllMusic	2/5 stars
Clouds and Clocks	mixed

Reviewing the Fred Records remastered edition, Beppe Colli wrote in Clouds and Clocks that he was pleased to see Live in Japan, long out-of-print, reissued on CD, and sounding just as "great" and "fresh" as the original LPs. He said that here Frith sounds "quite orchestral and polyphonic, with strong contrasts in both timbre and volume". Colli did complain, however, that while the digitizing process worked well, the resulting CD sounds "a bit too 'modern', and in a way, 'false'". He felt that his Live in Japan LP records "sounded more 'alive'".

Nicole V. Gagné wrote in her 1990 book, Sonic Transports: New Frontiers in Our Music that Frith "unearthes extraordinary vistas of sound" on Live in Japan. She called his solos "spectacular", but added that his "guitars on the table approach" can be "rough sledding for newcomers, because they can't readily identify what it is they're hearing".

== Track listing ==
All tracks by Fred Frith.

Side 1
No.	Title	Length
1.	"Osaka 1"	21:42

Side 2
No.	Title	Length
2.	"Osaka 2"	2:16
3.	"Osaka 3"	2:15
4.	"Fukuoka 1"	9:30

Side 3
No.	Title	Length
5.	"Fukuoka 2"	9:17
6.	"Maebashi 1"	8:22

Side 4
No.	Title	Length
7.	"Fukuoka 3"	11:22
8.	"Tokyo 1"	3:50

== Concert venues ==
Recorded live in Japan at:

- Nichifutsu Kaikan, Tokyo, 11 July 1981
- Mainichi Kokusai Salon, Osaka, 17 July 1981
- 80s Factory, Fukuoka, 20 July 1981
- Kawai Hall, Maebashi, 22 July 1981

== Personnel ==
- Fred Frith
  - 1961 Burns Black Bison guitar
  - 1974 Charles Fletcher custom-made double-neck guitar (one fretted, one fretless)
  - anonymous "wrecked" violin
  - piano
  - WW II pilot's throat microphone
  - HH electronic SM200 stereo mixer
  - amplifier with HH digital effects unit

=== Production ===
- Collated and adjusted at Sorcerer Sound, New York City, by Fred Frith, Greg Curry and Adam Moseley.

== CD releases ==
Live in Japan was reissued on CD on Fred Records in October 2010. None of the original booklets, posters or artwork from the two LP box were included. It was remastered and restored from a virgin vinyl copy by Tom Dimuzio. The original master tapes were unobtainable.

== See also ==
- Fred Frith's equipment

== Works cited ==
- Gagné, Nicole V. (1990). Sonic Transports: New Frontiers in Our Music. De Falco Books. ISBN 978-0-9625145-0-0.
