= Field Days (The Amanda Loops) =

Studio album by Fred Frith
- Released: November 2015
- Recorded: 2011
- Studio: Guerilla Recordings, Oakland, California
- Genre: Experimental music
- Length: 38:44
- Label: Fred (UK)
- Producer: Fred Frith

Fred Frith chronology
Angels on the Edge of Time (2015)	Field Days (The Amanda Loops) (2015)	Propaganda (2015)

Music for Dance series chronology
Nowhere, Sideshow, Thin Air (2009)	Field Days (The Amanda Loops) (2015)	Propaganda (2015)

Field Days (The Amanda Loops) is a studio album by English guitarist, composer and improvisor Fred Frith. It comprises 14 pieces for dance written by Frith for choreographer Amanda Miller and the Nederland Dans Theater. The album was released by Fred Records in November 2015.

== Track listing ==
All tracks composed by Fred Frith.

No.	Title	Length
1.	"Prologue"	2:56
2.	"Run Don't Walk"	1:17
3.	"One Road, Many Destinations"	4:04
4.	"Shimmer, Simmer"	3:31
5.	"Up Ahead"	2:49
6.	"Desert Sundown"	3:39
7.	"Ran Didn't Hide"	2:01
8.	"Hills Have Eyes"	2:01
9.	"Moving on Sideways"	1:45
10.	"Moving on Up"	3:09
11.	"Act of Faith"	3:58
12.	"Home Stretch"	3:03
13.	"Jumped In"	1:48
14.	"Epilogue"	2:43

Sources: AllMusic, Discogs, SquidCo

== Personnel ==
- Fred Frith – all other instruments
- Carla Kihlstedt – Nyckelharpa, violin
- Kiku Day – Shakuhachi
- Daan Vandewalle – piano
- William Winant – percussion
- Lotte Anker – saxophone
- Arte Sax Quartet – saxophones
- Arditti Quartet – strings

Sources: Discogs, SquidCo

=== Sound and artwork ===
Recorded at Guerilla Recordings, Oakland, California, 2011.

- Myles Boisen – engineer
- Fred Frith – producer

Source: Discogs
