= To Sail, to Sail =

Studio album by Fred Frith
- Released: July 2008
- Recorded: February 14 and 15, 2008
- Studio: Guerrilla Recording, Oakland, California
- Genre: Classical; blues; folk; free improvisation
- Length: 65:23
- Label: Tzadik (US)
- Producer: Fred Frith

Fred Frith chronology
| The Art of Memory II (2008) | To Sail, to Sail (2008) | Still Urban (2009) |

To Sail, to Sail is a studio album of acoustic guitar solos by English guitarist, composer and improvisor Fred Frith. It is Frith's first album of acoustic guitar solos and crosses musical borders with 16 tracks of classical, blues, folk and free improvisation. Frith dedicates each track to some of the important figures in his musical life, including Champion Jack Dupree, John Cage, Terry Riley, Daevid Allen, Barre Phillips and Davey Graham. The album was released on Tzadik Records' Key Series in 2008.

== Reception ==
Professional ratings
Review scores
| Source | Rating |
|---|---|
| All About Jazz | favorable |

In a review for AllMusic, Charity Stafford called the album "a quiet, moving masterpiece," and wrote: "To Sail, to Sail is a beautiful, reflective album that creates a sense of wistfulness and nostalgia. Frith has never sounded so lyrical before, although the spiky, cerebral aspect of his music remains undimmed."

Marc Medwin, writing for All About Jazz, commented: "To Sail, To Sail... is a study in contrast, space and unpretentious virtuosity... Continuing in the tradition of Guitar Improvisations and Clearing, Frith has fashioned a radical series of sonic excursions whose recorded sound is as beautiful and as subtle as the playing."

In an article for Something Else Reviews, Mark Saleski stated: "What's really cool about releases like this is the new set of possibilities that is presented. I mean, I don't know who Camel Zekri or Robbie Basho are but if they're big in Frith's mind, it would be silly to not check them out."

== Track listing ==
All tracks written by Fred Frith.

1. "Because Your Mama Wants You Home" – 2:39
2. "Weather Gauge" – 4:23
3. "Reconstructed" – 4:07
4. "Life on Venus" – 4:29
5. "Mondays" – 2:05
6. "Life-Enhancing Interior" – 4:00
7. "First Light" – 4:45
8. "Scratch Orchestra" – 4:16
9. "The Wrong Door" – 5:05
10. "Circuit Breakers and Fuses" – 5:05
11. "The Slightest Shiver" – 2:32
12. "Sheep's Head, 1963" – 5:40
13. "Life by Another Name" – 3:38
14. "Dog Watch" – 6:16
15. "Hopscotch Horizon" – 3:19
16. "King Dawn" – 3:04

== Personnel ==
- Fred Frith – Taylor 810 Model steel-string acoustic guitar
