= Bernd Weber =

German neuroscientist

- Born: 20 July 1976 (age 50); Bonn, Germany
- Education: University of Bonn
- Known for: Cognitive Neuroscience

Bernd Weber (born 20 July 1976, Bonn) is a German professor and a clinical neuroscientist at the Center for Economics and Neuroscience CENs in Bonn. Since 2019, he has been serving as the Dean of the Medical Faculty at the University of Bonn.

== Biography ==
=== Early life and education ===
In 2003, he graduated as an M.D. (Doctor of Medicine) from the University of Bonn and started his medical residency at the Department of Epileptology at the University Hospital Bonn.

=== Academic career ===
Between 2010 and 2015, he held a Heisenberg-professorship for the „Biological basis of human economic decision making“ funded by the German Research Foundation (DFG). From 2017 to 2019 he served as Vice Dean for Medical Education and, in 2019, he was elected as Dean of the Medical Faculty of the University of Bonn. Since, he has also been a Member of the Board at the University Medical Center Bonn.
