= The Art of Memory (album) =

Live album by John Zorn and Fred Frith

Live album by John Zorn and Fred Frith
- Released: 1994
- Recorded: Late 1993
- Venue: New York City
- Genre: Avant-garde
- Label: Incus Records Incus CD 20

John Zorn and Fred Frith chronology
The Art of Memory (1994)	50th Birthday Celebration Volume Five (2004)

John Zorn chronology
Masada: Beit (1995)	The Art of Memory (1995)	Masada: Gimel (1995)

Fred Frith chronology
Live in Trondheim, Berlin & Limoges, Vol. 2 (1994)	The Art of Memory (1994)	Middle of the Moment (1995)

The Art of Memory is a live album of improvised music by John Zorn and Fred Frith. The album was released on Derek Bailey's Incus Records in 1994.

== Reception ==
The AllMusic review by Thom Jurek stated: "This is a revelatory album, and a near matchless collaboration".

Professional ratings
Review scores
Source	Rating
AllMusic	4.5/5 stars
The Penguin Guide to Jazz Recordings	3/4 stars

== Track listing ==
All compositions by John Zorn and Fred Frith.

1. "The Combiner" – 4:41
2. "The Ladder" – 5:24
3. "The Chain" – 4:54
4. "The Field" – 7:58
5. "The Table" – 8:44
6. "The Interpreter" – 5:06
7. "The Tree" – 4:20
8. "The Fountain and the Mirror" – 4:30

== Personnel ==
- John Zorn – alto saxophone
- Fred Frith – guitar
