= Pacifica (Fred Frith album) =

Studio album by Fred Frith
- Released: 1998
- Recorded: 1995, Italy; 1997, Chile
- Genre: Modern classical; experimental rock
- Length: 49:08
- Label: Tzadik (US)
- Producer: Fred Frith

Fred Frith chronology
The Previous Evening (1997)	Pacifica (1998)	Friends & Enemies (1999)

Professional ratings
Review scores
Source	Rating
AllMusic	4/5 stars

Pacifica is a studio album by English guitarist, composer and improvisor Fred Frith. It was composed by Frith in 1994 as "a meditation for 21 musicians with texts by Pablo Neruda". The work was commissioned by AngelicA - festival internazionale di musica of Bologna, Italy. It was performed live, under the direction of Frith, by the Bolognese Eva Kant ensemble at Festival Musique Action of Vandœuvre-lès-Nancy, France, and at AngelicA in May 1994, and recorded in a studio in 1995 in Modena, Italy. Texts, taken from the Chilean poet Pablo Neruda's works, were recorded by Sergio Meza in September 1997 in Santiago, Chile and were added to the music in 1998. The album was released on Tzadik Records' Composer Series in 1998.

Frith does not perform on this album.

== Background ==
Pacifica was composed by Frith at Big Sur, California in a cabin overlooking the Pacific Ocean. It is "a slow meditation on life and death" and reflects a series of events that occurred in Frith's life at the time, namely the death of two close friends and the birth of his daughter.

Pacifica was composed for an ensemble that included prepared guitars, wind instruments, percussion, a vocalist and a performer on records, CDs and tapes. The 19 member Eva Kant ensemble (named after a 1960s comic strip heroine, Eva Kant) performed the piece, with fragments of recited text from the Death Song of the Cupeño tribe of California and the tribal names of all the original inhabitants of California. The recording was supplemented later with texts from Pablo Neruda's Soneto IX and Cien sonetos de amor, read by Sergio Meza.

== Track listing ==
All tracks composed by Fred Frith.

No.	Title	Length
1.	"Part 1"	46:22
2.	"Part 2"	2:46

== Personnel ==
- Eva Kant ensemble
  - Margareth Kammerer – voice
  - Stefano Zorzanello – flute, piccolo, soprano saxophone
  - Daniela Cattivelli – alto saxophone
  - Olivia Bignardi – clarinet, bass clarinet
  - Silvia Fanti – accordion
  - Salvatore Panu – trombone
  - Giorgio Simbola – trombone
  - Ferdinando d'Andria – trumpet, violin
  - Pierangelo Galantino – violin, double bass
  - Lelio Giannetto – double bass
  - Claudio Lanteri – prepared guitar
  - Paolo Angeli – prepared guitar
  - Massimo Simonini – records, CDs, tapes
  - Filomena Forleo – piano
  - Nicola Zonca – marimba
  - Tiziano Popoli – keyboards
  - Andrea Martignoni – percussion
  - Mario Martignoni – percussion
  - Pino Urso – percussion
- Sergio Meza – reading texts by Pablo Neruda

=== Sound ===
- Eva Kant ensemble recorded by Davide Sandri at Centro Musica, Modena, Italy, July 1995
- Sergio Meza recorded by Carlos Gabezas at Studio Constantinople, Santiago, Chile, September 1997
- Mixed by Peter Hardt at Studio Jankowski, Stuttgart, Germany, February 1998
- Mastered by Allan Tucker at Foothill Digital, New York City, United States.
