= Tomas Kurth =

German artist (born 1955)

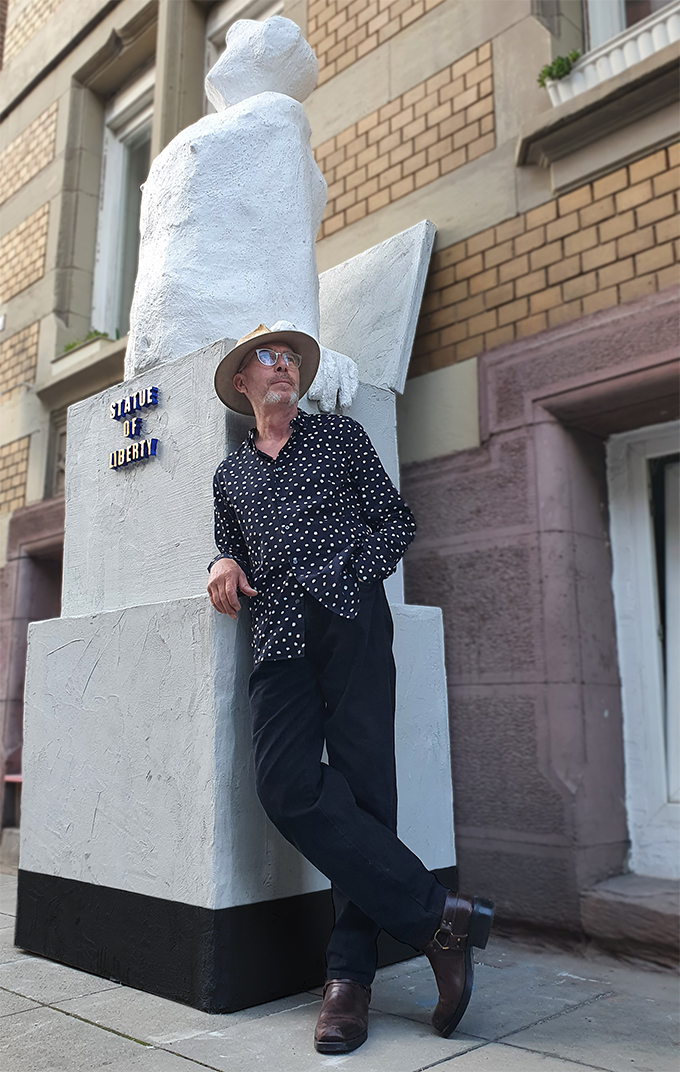
- 2021, with his "Statue of Liberty"
- Born: Tomas Kurth; July 22, 1955 (age 71); Stuttgart, West Germany
- Other names: vanderkurth Tom Kurth
- Education: ABK Stuttgart
- Occupations: Painter, Sculptor, Musician
- Years active: 1970s – present
- Website: bildbar.de

Tomas Kurth (born 22 July 1955 in Stuttgart, Germany), also known as vanderkurth (sometimes van der kurth), is a German artist. He is a painter, sculptor, musician, and designer.

== Life and works ==
Since 1976, Kurth has been working as a freelance artist, having studios in Stuttgart and Ulm since 1992. He began exhibiting his work in the 1970s, primarily in Southern Germany. In Stuttgart-West, Kurth operates the Bildbar, his own gallery to show his own works.

=== Biography ===
Tomas Kurth attended Dillmann-Gymnasium in Stuttgart. He held his first public exhibit while still a pupil. From the mid 1970s, Kurth studied graphics design in Stuttgart under Robert Förch, and started working as a conservationist, restoring artworks in churches and castles in Southwestern Germany. In the late 1970s, Kurth started living in Bad Liebenzell-Monakam an alternative commune. At an exhibit in Calw in 1978, Kurth displayed etchings and pencil drawings, showing predominantly landscapes and still lifes.

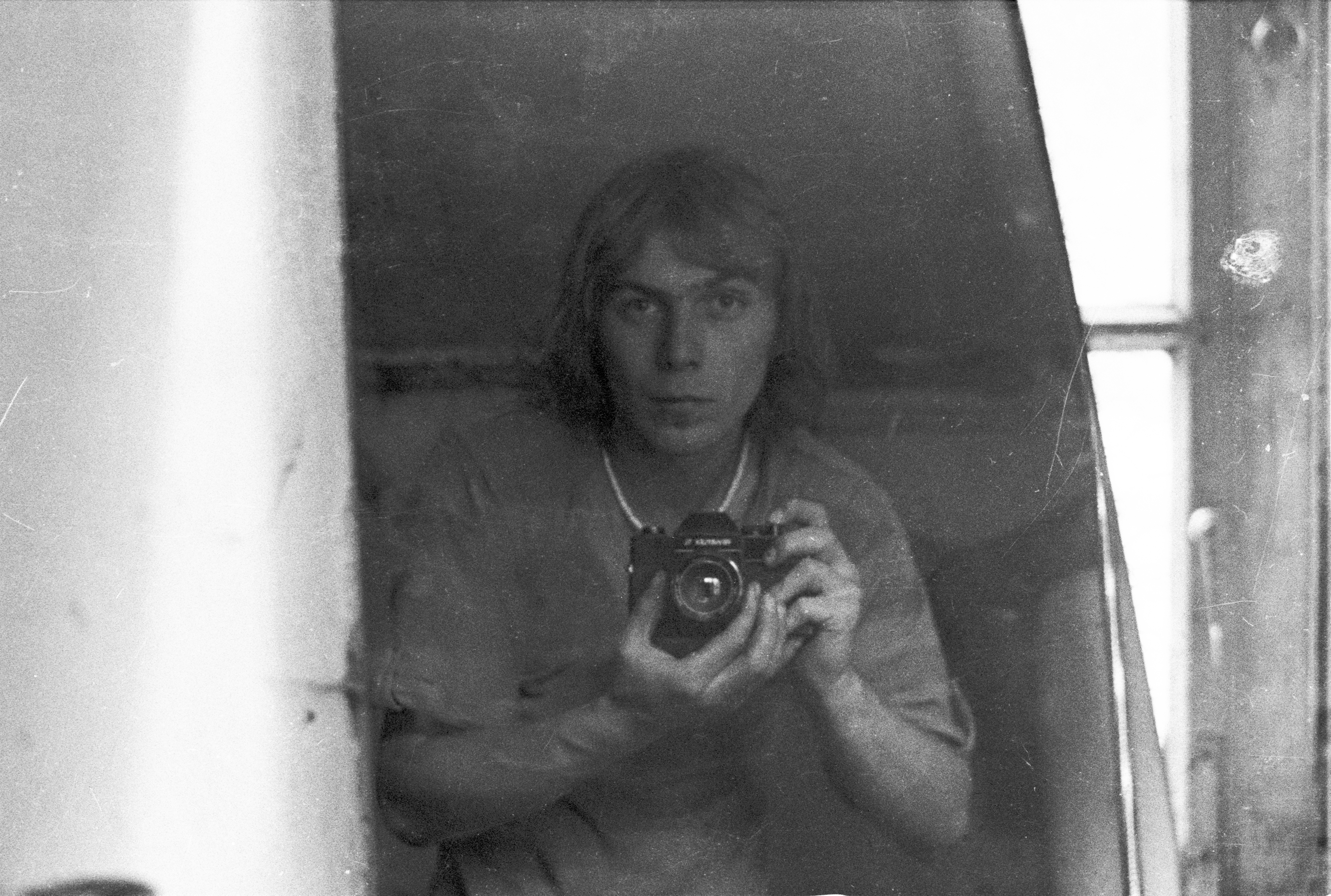
Self portrait, around 1978 in Bad Liebenzell-Monakam.

Between 1980-1986, Kurth studied art at ABK Stuttgart under Peter Grau and Wolfgang Gäfgen. In 1991, Kurth's interior design and restoration work at Bebenhausen Abbey was discussed and illustrated in German magazine Schöner Wohnen.

In November 1991, Kurth spent several months on Taprobane Island in Sri Lanka. During this time, he painted only islands. At an exhibition in Reutlingen from 30 April - 30 June 1994, it was noted that Kurth at that point specialised in "classical landscape paintings with a touch of humour". The exhibit showed 85 works by four artists. In one report, Kurth's oil painting "Hirsch mit Röhren" was called a "humorous variant of classical animal portraits". In the late 1990s, Kurth did several works that focused on cubism, while retaining his humorous approach. He presented them at a solo exhibition in Reutlingen in 1999. Kurth himself mentioned that he addressed cubism in an ironic way. While some paintings at the exhibit were directly referencing that style, Susanne Till mentions that the majority could be classified to contain elements of magical realism.

Around 2004, Kurth started a series of more than one hundred paintings depicting islands, inspired by the idea he had in 1991 on Taprobane Island. While promoting this series in 2010, Kurth gave his gallery Bildbar the subtitle "Manufaktur für einsame Inseln" ("Workshop for Lonely Islands").

Between 2014 and 2019, Kurth's gallery Bildbar participated in five editions of Stuttgart's "Lange Nacht der Museen" ("Long Night of the Museums").

From 2020, with his "Denkmäler" ("Monuments") series, Kurth for a while specialised in statues. By the summer of 2021, the series comprised around 40 sculptures. According to Kurth, these monuments are "not intended for famous personalities as usual, but for 'ordinary people'."

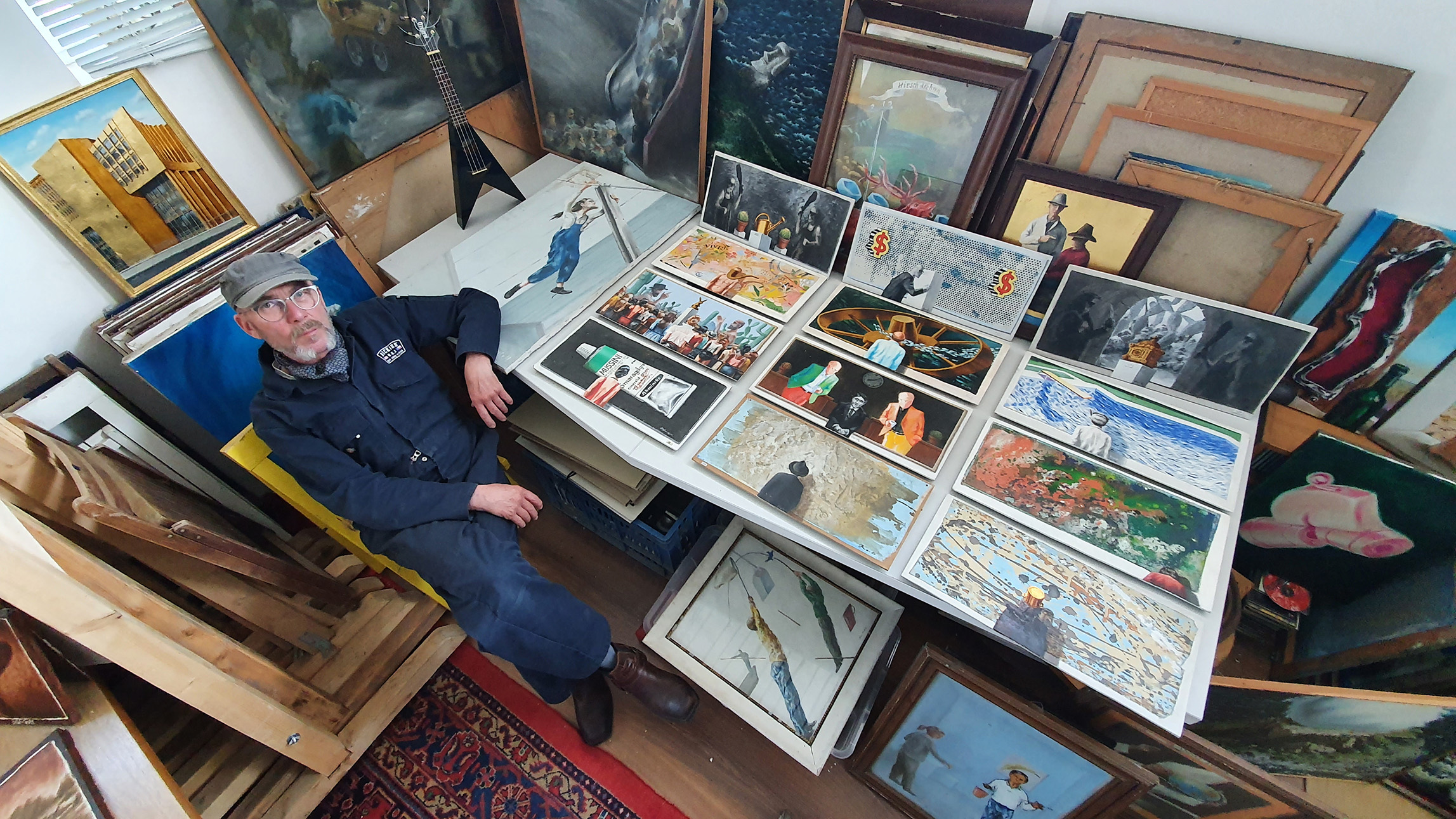
Tomas Kurth in April 2021, surrounded by some of his paintings.

As the intended main work of his "Monuments" series, Kurth unveiled the larger-than-life "Statue of Liberty of Stuttgart" in his home town on 26 June 2021. According to his own statement at the occasion, this was intended to "symbolise overcoming the most difficult phase of the coronavirus pandemic." The statue's unveiling was reported on TV and in the press. On 23 September 2022, Kurth opened a sculpture garden next to his Bildbar gallery where he displays his statues.

In 2023, Theaterhaus Stuttgart exhibited a retrospective of Kurth's work. The next year, Kurth published his book "Secret of Pisa", which features humorous drawings, etchings and paintings involving the Leaning Tower of Pisa.

Tomas Kurth's style is often satirical and characterised by a humorous view of the world and society. His paintings have been described as "humorous, enigmatic and extremely entertaining". He usually works in series, processing one idea in several works of a similar style. Christine Wawra mentions that some of Kurth's paintings are stylistically close to caricatures.
