= RecRec Music =

Swiss independent record label

- Founded: 1983
- Founder: Daniel Waldner; Veit F. Stauffer
- Defunct: 1997
- Genre: Rock in Opposition, avant-rock, experimental music
- Country of origin: Switzerland

RecRec Music was a Swiss independent record label created in 1983 by Daniel Waldner and Veit F. Stauffer. The label was modeled on, and affiliated to, the British independent record label Recommended Records, but remained financially independent. The label went bankrupt in 1997 after the death of Waldner in 1995.

== History ==
In 1979 Veit F. Stauffer and Daniel Waldner co-founded RecRec Zürich in Switzerland, after suggestions from Chris Cutler that they establish a record distribution company similar to the British independent record label Recommended Records that Cutler had created the previous year. RecRec Music, RecRec's record label, was created by Waldner in 1983, and built up a roster of over 30 bands and musicians.

On 3 September 1995, Waldner and his son, Valentin died in an accident in the Swiss Alps. RecRec Music continued to operate, but began making losses and was declared bankrupt in May 1997. The label was split into two companies, RecRec-Shop, the record shop, and RecRec Medien AG, the distributor, with two new labels, Make-Up and Make-Up Your World. The companies continue to operate today, although with a different musical emphasis to that of RecRec Music.

== RecRec Music roster ==
Chris Cutler (left) of Recommended Records and Daniel Waldner of RecRec Music, July 1986.

RecRec Music released music by over 30 bands and groups, including:

- After Dinner
- Bob Ostertag
- Camberwell Now
- Etron Fou Leloublan
- Ferdinand Richard
- Fred Frith
- Goz of Kermeur
- Massacre
- Negativland
- Nimal
- Pale Nudes
- Skeleton Crew
- Tenko
- The Ex
- The Hat Shoes

== See also ==
- Recommended Records
- Fred Records
- List of record labels
