= P53 (disambiguation) =

p53 is a tumor suppressor protein.

P53 may also refer to:

- p53 (band), an experimental music group
  - p53 (album), their 1996 live album
- Curtiss XP-53, an American experimental fighter aircraft
- HMS Ultor (P53), a submarine of the Royal Navy
- INS Savitri (P53), a patrol vessel of the Indian Navy
- P53 road (Ukraine)
- Papyrus 53, a biblical manuscript
- Pattern 1853 Enfield, a British rifle-musket
- P53, a state regional road in Latvia
- P53, a ThinkPad P series laptop
