= Ireneusz Socha =

Polish composer

- Born: 1964 (age 61–62); Dębica, Poland

Ireneusz Socha (born 1964) is a Polish drummer and composer. He co-founded the zine DRUT, which pioneered coverage of Polish art during its publication from 1985 to 1987. Socha managed the group Kirkut-Koncept, which performed original compositions that ranged between rock, cabaret, ethnic, and experimental music during its 1986 to 1990 lifetime. During the 1980s, Socha was affiliated with other avant-garde Polish groups, such as Przestrzenie, music theatre troupes, the improvisation troupe Na Przyklad, and the post-industrial band Hiena. He has collaborated with Jarosław Bester, Bolesław Błaszczyk, Marek Chołoniewski, Chris Cutler, Piotr Czerny, Tomasz Duda, Joane Hétu, Tomasz Krakowiak, Jacek Podsiadło, Raphael Roginski, and Yuriy Yaremchuk.

Socha translated Chris Cutler's 1985 book File Under Popular into Polish, publishing it through the Zielona Sowa Publishing House in 1999. In 2000, he founded Dembitzer Music. Between 2004 and 2014, he translated the Sefer Dembitz to Polish for the genealogy organization JewishGen. Socha wrote the script and music for the 2004 short documentary Nothing Remains Forever (Society of Friends of the Land of Dębica).

== Selected discography ==
- Najduchy "Lament świętokrzyski" (CD, Requiem Records/Dembitzer Music, 2014)
- VA "SLEEP WELL chapter IV - Glad I was young in the 80's" (CD, Requiem Records/Dembitzer Music, 2013)
- Ireneusz Socha "Polin" (CD, Mathka/Dembitzer Music, 2012)
- KITS "Four Years In Pieces" (CD-R, Dembitzer Music, 2007)
- The Cracow Klezmer Band "Balan: Book of Angels Volume 5" (CD, Tzadik, 2006)
- Ireneusz Socha "Sztetlach" (CD, Dembitzer Music, 2005)
- Chris Cutler "Twice Around The Earth" (CD, ReR, 2005)
- VA "Radio Swietlicki" (CD, Lampa i Iskra Boza, 2004)
- Najduchy "Porzadek : Chaos" (CD-R, Dembitzer Music, 2003)
- Ireneusz Socha/Tomasz Krakowiak "KITS" (CD-R, Dembitzer Music/Dobosz Records, 2002)
- VA "City Songs 3" (CD-R, Requiem Records, 2001)
- Ireneusz Socha/Barbara Socha/Joane Hétu/Marek Choloniewski/Boleslaw Blaszczyk "With/Without" (CD-R, Dembitzer Music, 2000)
- Ireneusz Socha/Piotr Czerny "Microaudioplays" (CD, Soror Mystica, 1998)
- Kirkut-Koncept/Na Przyklad/Przestrzenie "Nowe zycie" (MC, OBUH Records, 1996)
- Na Przyklad "Jazz zmartwychwstania" (MC, 1991)
- Kirkut-Koncept "Kamien na kamieniu" (MC, 1989)
- VA "Polish Road" (MC, Organic Tapes, 1989)
- VA "Proba orkiestry - FAMA '88" (MC, Radio Szczecin, 1988)
- Przestrzenie "Praca kolektywna" (MC, 1988)
- Kirkut-Koncept "Kirkut-Koncept" (MC, ARS, 1988)
- Kirkut-Koncept "Piknik na kirkucie" (MC, 1987)
- Kirkut-Koncept "Piesenki" (MC, Anti-Musik Der Landsh, 1986)
