= The Art Box =

Box set by Art Bears
- Released: 2004
- Recorded: 1978–1980, 1984, 1998–2003
- Genre: Avant-rock
- Length: 281:33
- Label: Recommended (UK)
- Producers: Art Bears and others

Art Bears chronology
| The World as It Is Today (1981) | The Art Box (2004) | Art Bears Revisited (2004) |

Art Bears Revisited
- 2xCD album containing Discs 4 and 5 of the box set.

The Art Box is a six-CD box set by English avant-rock group Art Bears. It contains all Art Bears album and single releases, plus new material, including live and unreleased Art Bears tracks, and unreleased remixes and reworkings of Art Bears material by other musicians. The box set also contains a book of photographs, artwork, articles, interviews and commentary on the CD tracks, the work process, the band and their tour of Europe in 1979. The Art Bears material was recorded between 1978 and 1980, while the work by other musicians was recorded between 1998 and 2003. The box set was released in 2004 to commemorate the 25th anniversary of the band's formation. A double-CD entitled Art Bears Revisited containing Discs four and five of the box set was released later in 2004.

Discs one, two and three are remastered versions (by Bob Drake) of the first three Art Bears albums, Hopes and Fears (1978), Winter Songs (1979) and The World as It Is Today (1981). Discs four and five, entitled Art Bears Revisited, contain remixed and reworked Art Bears pieces by various musicians, plus two Art Bears singles and an unreleased Art Bears track. Disc six contains more remixed and reworked Art Bears pieces by various musicians, including a 1984 cover of "The Song of Investment Capital Overseas" by Duck and Cover, plus five live Art Bears tracks, four of which were never officially released before.

== Reception ==
Professional ratings
Review scores
| Source | Rating |
|---|---|
| AllMusic | 4.5/5 stars |
| Pitchfork Media | 9/10 |

Dave Lynch at AllMusic described Art Bears' music as "an adventurous mix of avant rock experimentalism, smatterings of noise and dissonance, British folk flavors, medieval imagery, and leftist, anti-corporate politics". He said that The Art Box "is a comprehensive document of a band that represented what the best rock music should be: utterly uncompromising". Dominique Leone wrote in Pitchfork Media that Art Bears made music "almost as ahead of the curve today as it did twenty years ago", and said that they deserve the "deluxe reissue treatment" of a 6-CD box set. In a review at BBC Music, Peter Marsh wrote that Art Bears "recorded some of the most carefully crafted (and indeed timeless) music you're ever likely to hear". He added that while he felt that many of the remixes "seem unnecessary at best", he liked the live tracks where Art Bears perform songs "never meant to be performed". Marsh particularly liked Fred Frith's guitar solo on "Coda to Man and Boy".

== Art Bears personnel ==
- Fred Frith – guitars, violin, viola, harmonium, xylophone, keyboards, bass guitar
- Chris Cutler – drums, percussion, noise
- Dagmar Krause – voice

== Disc 1: Hopes and Fears ==
Contains all the tracks from the original release of the first Art Bears album, Hopes and Fears (1978)

=== Track list ===
| No. | Title | Artist | Length |
|---|---|---|---|
| 1. | "On Suicide" (Brecht, Eisler) | Henry Cow | 1:26 |
| 2. | "The Dividing Line" (Cutler, Frith, Cooper) | Henry Cow | 4:11 |
| 3. | "Joan" (Cutler, Frith) | Henry Cow | 3:05 |
| 4. | "Maze" (Cutler, Frith) | Henry Cow | 5:05 |
| 5. | "In Two Minds" (Cutler, Frith) | Henry Cow | 8:45 |
| 6. | "Terrain" (Frith) | Art Bears | 3:49 |
| 7. | "The Tube" (Cutler, Frith) | Art Bears | 3:05 |
| 8. | "The Dance" (Cutler, Frith) | Art Bears | 5:09 |
| 9. | "The Pirate Song" (Cutler, Hodgkinson) | Henry Cow | 1:28 |
| 10. | "Labyrinth" (Cutler, Hodgkinson) | Henry Cow | 2:15 |
| 11. | "Riddle" (Cutler, Frith) | Henry Cow | 2:49 |
| 12. | "Moeris Dancing" (Frith) | Henry Cow | 5:08 |
| 13. | "Piers" (Cutler, Frith) | Art Bears | 2:10 |

=== Additional personnel ===
- Tim Hodgkinson (tracks 1–5, 9–12) – organ, clarinet, piano on "The Pirate Song"
- Lindsay Cooper (tracks 1–6, 8–12) – bassoon, oboe, soprano, recorder
- Georgie Born (tracks 1–5, 9–12) – bass guitar, cello, vocals on "Maze"

=== Recording information ===
- Tracks 1–5, 9–12: recorded by Henry Cow at Sunrise Studio, Switzerland, 15–29 January 1978
- Tracks 6–8, 13: recorded by Art Bears at Kaleidophon Studios, London, 15–18 March 1978

== Disc 2: Winter Songs ==
Contains all the tracks from the original release of the second Art Bears album, Winter Songs (1979)

=== Track list ===
All tracks composed by Fred Frith and Chris Cutler.

| No. | Title | Artist | Length |
|---|---|---|---|
| 1. | "The Bath of Stars" | Art Bears | 1:45 |
| 2. | "First Things First" | Art Bears | 2:50 |
| 3. | "Gold" | Art Bears | 1:41 |
| 4. | "The Summer Wheel" | Art Bears | 2:47 |
| 5. | "The Slave" | Art Bears | 3:38 |
| 6. | "The Hermit" | Art Bears | 2:59 |
| 7. | "Rats and Monkeys" | Art Bears | 3:24 |
| 8. | "The Skeleton" | Art Bears | 3:11 |
| 9. | "The Winter Wheel" | Art Bears | 3:06 |
| 10. | "Man and Boy" | Art Bears | 3:21 |
| 11. | "Winter/War" | Art Bears | 3:05 |
| 12. | "Force" | Art Bears | 0:54 |
| 13. | "Three Figures" | Art Bears | 1:51 |
| 14. | "Three Wheels" | Art Bears | 3:35 |

=== Recording information ===
- Recorded at Sunrise Studio, Switzerland, 22 November – 5 December 1978

== Disc 3: The World as It Is Today ==
Contains all the tracks from the original release of the third Art Bears album, The World as It Is Today (1981)

=== Track list ===
All tracks composed by Fred Frith and Chris Cutler.

| No. | Title | Artist | Length |
|---|---|---|---|
| 1. | "The Song of Investment Capital Overseas" | Art Bears | 2:38 |
| 2. | "Truth" | Art Bears | 2:56 |
| 3. | "Freedom" | Art Bears | 3:25 |
| 4. | "(Armed) Peace" | Art Bears | 2:30 |
| 5. | "Civilisation" | Art Bears | 4:52 |
| 6. | "Democracy" | Art Bears | 2:22 |
| 7. | "The Song of the Martyrs" | Art Bears | 4:09 |
| 8. | "Law" | Art Bears | 0:51 |
| 9. | "The Song of the Monopolists" | Art Bears | 1:48 |
| 10. | "The Song of the Dignity of Labour Under Capital" | Art Bears | 2:27 |
| 11. | "Albion, Awake!" | Art Bears | 4:08 |

=== Recording information ===
- Recorded at Sunrise Studio, Switzerland, August–September 1980

== Disc 4: Art Bears Revisited disc 1 ==
Contains remixed and reworked Art Bears pieces by various musicians, plus two Art Bears singles (tracks 17–18)

=== Track list ===
| No. | Title | Artist | Length |
|---|---|---|---|
| 1. | "The Violin in Winter" | Jon Rose | 3:49 |
| 2. | "Tranne Lacrimae (Bar Tears)" | Ossatura | 4:12 |
| 3. | "On Suicide" | Otomo Yoshihide/Ground Zero | 5:49 |
| 4. | "Artico & Baci" | Massimo Simonini | 3:37 |
| 5. | "The Tube" | When/Lars Pedersen | 2:44 |
| 6. | "Rats and Monkeys Remix" | Warrick Sony/Kalahari Surfers/DJ Ballard | 3:15 |
| 7. | "Time/Bye" | John Oswald | 5:01 |
| 8. | "Three Bears Room" | Chris Cutler | 4:49 |
| 9. | "The World as it Hopes in Winter" | Roberto Musci/Giovanni Venosta/Massimo Mariani | 3:55 |
| 10. | "The Bath of Stars"/"The Skeleton" | The Residents | 4:51 |
| 11. | "Tokusa-No-Kandakara (91 Pieces Of 'C')" | Yasushi Utsunomiya | 3:02 |
| 12. | "The Skeleton" | Herb Heinz | 2:59 |
| 13. | "Long Winter" | Martin Archer | 5:03 |
| 14. | "Winter/War/Force" | Jon Leidecker/Wobbly | 4:09 |
| 15. | "Everything Again" | Fred Frith | 4:14 |
| 16. | "Coquelicot" | Jocelyn Robert | 7:17 |
| 17. | "Collapse" (Cutler, Frith) | Art Bears | 4:51 |
| 18. | "All Hail" (Cutler, Frith) | Art Bears | 4:08 |

=== Additional personnel ===
- Jon Rose (track 1) – violin, piano
- Elio Martusciello (track 2)
- Maurizio Martusciello (track 2)
- Fabrizio Spera (track 2) – drums
- Luca Venitucci (track 2)
- Sachiko M (track 3) – sine-wave sampling
- Eto Naoko (track 3) – prepared piano
- Kikuchi Naruyoshi (track 3) – tenor saxophone
- Yasushi Utsunomiya (track 11) – sub vocal
- Kiyomi Yamada (track 11) – vocal, violin, fieldworks
- Tetsuji Hayashi (track 11) – shou, hichiriki
- Kouryu Koukiji (track 11) – sub vocal
- Sakura Koukiji (track 11) – dog voice
- Mitsutarou Inagaki (track 11) – honey bee sound
- Herb Heinz (track 12) – Midi boxes, guitar
- Martin Archer (track 13) – digital piano, electronics
- Jocelyn Robert (track 16) – field recordings

=== Recording information ===
- Track 1: recorded Summer 1998
- Track 2: recorded live at Roma, 1979 (Art Bears tracks); live at Bourges, May 1998; at Roma, December 1998
- Track 3: recorded at GOK Sound, Tokyo, 10 November 1998
- Track 4: recorded at Massimo Simonini's home, January 2000
- Track 5: recorded at M.O.R.I.A., Oslo, February 1999
- Track 6: recorded, March 1999
- Track 7: recorded, March 1999
- Track 8: recorded, January 1996
- Track 9: recorded at Loa Studios and Fx Studio, Milano, January 2000
- Track 10: recorded, January 2000
- Track 11: recorded at Studio Nirvana, 2000
- Track 12: recorded at IS Productions, Oakland, California, July 2000
- Track 13: recorded at Telecottage & Sound Kitchen Studios, Sheffield, Summer 2000
- Track 14: recorded, August 2000
- Track 15: recorded at Tonstudio Jankowski, Stuttgart, 13 July 2000
- Track 16: recorded at CannedGods Mobile, September 2000
- Tracks 17–18: recorded at Kaleidophon Studios, London, Winter 1979

== Disc 5: Art Bears Revisited disc 2 ==
Contains remixed and reworked Art Bears pieces by various musicians, plus an unfinished Art Bears piece, completed for the box set (track 18)

=== Track list ===
| No. | Title | Artist | Length |
|---|---|---|---|
| 1. | "Armed Peace Remix" | Roger Kleier | 2:36 |
| 2. | "Song of the Monopolists" | Bob Drake | 1:16 |
| 3. | "The Three Wheels Remix" | Andrea Rocca | 2:45 |
| 4. | "Gold" | Vitor Rua | 1:27 |
| 5. | "The Fourth Wheel" | Brian Woodbury | 4:10 |
| 6. | "The Three Figures" | Chris Cutler | 1:06 |
| 7. | "First Things First : The Mix That Should Not Be" | Bob Drake | 2:56 |
| 8. | "Monopolists Democracy" | Stevan Tickmayer | 4:24 |
| 9. | "All is Encompassed in the Night (part 1)" | Annie Gosfield | 1:35 |
| 10. | "All is Encompassed in the Night (part 2)" | Annie Gosfield | 1:35 |
| 11. | "All is Encompassed in the Night (part 3)" | Annie Gosfield | 1:37 |
| 12. | "The Summer Mix (part 1)" | Biota | 4:08 |
| 13. | "The Summer Mix (part 2)" | Biota | 2:47 |
| 14. | "The Summer Mix (part 3)" | Biota | 4:10 |
| 15. | "The Summer Mix (part 4)" | Biota | 3:09 |
| 16. | "Democracy Remix" | Thomas Dimuzio | 4:26 |
| 17. | "Some Truth" | Christian Marclay | 4:51 |
| 18. | "Carved in Stone (Rebirth)" (Cutler, Frith) | Art Bears | 1:46 |

=== Additional personnel ===
- Bob Drake (track 2) – Solina organ bass pedals
- Andrea Rocca (track 3) – ambient noises, electric guitar
- Vitor Rua (track 4) – bass flute, prepared piano, virtual orchestra, electronics
- Stevan Tickmayer (track 5) – virtual instruments
- Brian Woodbury (track 6) – bass guitar, piano, Microkorg synthesizer/Vocoder, Roland XV-3080 module, vocals

=== Recording information ===
- Track 1: recorded, 22 January 2003
- Tracks 2,7: recorded at Studio Midi-Pyrenees, Summer 2003
- Track 3: recorded at Roma, Summer 2003
- Track 4: recorded at Telectu's Studio, Lisboa, September 2003
- Track 5: recorded at The Rusty Scupper, Los Angeles, August 2003
- Track 6: recorded at Studio Midi-Pyrenees, September 2003
- Track 8: recorded in Stevan Tickmayer's work room, April 2003
- Track 9-11: recorded at the Djerassi Artists Residency Program, Woodside, California, Autumn 2002
- Track 12–15: recorded at Dys Studio, Bellvue, Colorado, Spring/Summer 2001 and Fall/Winter 2002/2003, edited, January 2003 at Eye In The Sky, Laporte, Colorado
- Track 16: recorded, August 2003
- Track 17: recorded at Noise Media, Brooklyn, Summer 2003
- Track 18: recorded at Sunrise Studio, Switzerland, November/December 1978, at Tonstudio Jankowski, Stuttgart, 13 July 2000 and at Studio Midi-Pyrenees, 29 June 2003

== Disc 6 and 7: Free Box CD + 3" CD ==
Contains remixed and reworked Art Bears pieces by various musicians, plus five live Art Bears pieces (tracks 4–7,11)

=== Track list ===
| No. | Title | Artist | Length |
|---|---|---|---|
| 1. | "And the Comedy Bears" | Bob Drake | 0:42 |
| 2. | "The Song of Investment Capital Overseas" (Cutler, Frith) | Duck and Cover | 3:42 |
| 3. | "Summer/Freedom" | John Oswald | 2:48 |
| 4. | "The Riddle" (Cutler, Frith) | Art Bears | 2:21 |
| 5. | "First Things First" (Cutler, Frith) | Art Bears | 1:55 |
| 6. | "March From the Dance" (Cutler, Frith) | Art Bears | 1:05 |
| 7. | "The Hermit" (Cutler, Frith) | Art Bears | 2:47 |
| 8. | "The Winter Mix" | Biota | 4:35 |
| 9. | "Wheels" | Fred Frith | 3:12 |
| 10. | "Tokusa-No-Kandakara II" | Yasushi Utsunomiya | 3:37 |
| 11. | "Coda to Man and Boy (on the additional 3" CD)" (Cutler, Frith) | Art Bears | 7:17 |

=== Additional personnel ===
- Tom Cora (track 2) – bass guitar
- Heiner Goebbels (track 2) – piano, synthesizer
- Alfred Harth (track 2) – tenor saxophone
- George Lewis (track 2) – trombone
- Marc Hollander (tracks 4–7,11) – keyboards
- Peter Blegvad (tracks 4–7,11) – bass guitar
- Kiyomi Yamada (track 10) – vocal, violin, fieldworks
- Mariko Ohkubo (track 10) – shamisen

=== Recording information ===
- Track 1: recorded at Studio Midi-Pyrenees, Summer 2003
- Track 2: recorded live at the Brecht Ensemble, East Berlin, 16 February 1984
- Track 3: recorded March 1999
- Tracks 4–7: recorded live, probably at Charleville, France, 16 April 1979
- Track 8: recorded at Dys Studio, Bellvue, Colorado and edited, October 2003 at Eye In The Sky, Laporte, Colorado
- Track 9: recorded at Tonstudio Jankowski, Stuttgart, 13 July 2000
- Track 10: recorded at Studio Nirvana, August 2001 – March 2002
- Track 11: recorded live at Cantù, Italy, 30 May 1979

== Art Bears Revisited ==
Discs 4 and 5 above were also released in 2004 on a double-CD entitled Art Bears Revisited.
