= Hopes and Fears (Art Bears album) =

Studio album by Art Bears
- Released: 15 May 1978
- Recorded: 15– 29 January 1978, Switzerland; 15–18 March 1978, London
- Studios: Sunrise, Kirchberg, Switzerland; Kaleidophon, London
- Genres: Avant-rock; post-punk
- Length: 48:25
- Label: Recommended (UK)
- Producers: Art Bears, Etienne Conod

Art Bears chronology
| Hopes and Fears (1978) | Winter Songs (1979) |

Hopes and Fears is the debut album by the English avant-rock group Art Bears. It comprises tracks by Henry Cow, Art Bears's predecessor, recorded at Sunrise Studios, Kirchberg in Switzerland in January 1978, and tracks by Art Bears, recorded at Kaleidophon Studios in London in March 1978.

== Background ==
Hopes and Fears began as a Henry Cow album, but after the first recording sessions in Switzerland in January 1978, some of the members of the band were unhappy about the predominance of song-oriented material. As a compromise it was agreed that two albums would be made: the songs would be released by Fred Frith, Chris Cutler and Dagmar Krause as Art Bears, and the instrumental compositions would be released later by Henry Cow. The newly formed Art Bears recorded four more tracks in London in March 1978 to complete Hopes and Fears, which was released in May 1978 under their name with the rest of Henry Cow credited as guests. Henry Cow continued to perform as a group and toured Europe until July that year. In August 1978 Henry Cow returned to Switzerland to record additional instrumental pieces for their last album, Western Culture, after which the group disbanded. Art Bears continued until 1981, performing in Europe and recording two more albums.

The release of Hopes and Fears sparked dissatisfaction amongst some of the members of Henry Cow. Tim Hodgkinson complained that some of the new Art Bears tracks recorded in London were derived from pieces Henry Cow had worked on in Switzerland, but not recorded – yet Art Bears claimed them as their own. Georgie Born said that she had written the bass lines for two of the Henry Cow tracks recorded in Switzerland, "Joan" and "In Two Minds", yet she was not credited on their release on Hopes and Fears. Hodgkinson stated, "I felt like something had been stolen from me", while Born felt that she had been "dispossessed of my labor". Born tweeted in 2021, "Time the myths around Hopes and Fears ended: it was a Henry Cow album but arguments among the boys meant it ended up as 'Art Bears': wrong, unjust, writes Lindsay [Cooper], Tim Hodgkinson and I out of the creative process."

== Description ==
Because of Henry Cow's presence on this album, Hopes and Fears is considered by some to be "the lost Henry Cow album". But the predominance of songs makes the album a bridge between Henry Cow and Art Bears, a move away from Henry Cow's usual intense compositions, and the beginnings of Art Bears's music, fully realised on their next two albums. It also shows Frith experimenting with eastern European folk music on "Moeris, Dancing", which he explored further on some of his subsequent solo albums, particularly Gravity (1980) and Speechless (1981).

"Joan" and "On Suicide" had been performed live by Henry Cow in 1977 and appear on Volume 7: Later and Post-Virgin of The 40th Anniversary Henry Cow Box Set (2009). The Hopes and Fears version of "Joan" differs from the earlier live recording in that it is shorter, and the lyrics are different. Cutler wrote the original lyrics for "Joan" and Tim Hodgkinson's "The Pirate Song", but Henry Cow were unhappy with them, and the songs were withdrawn from their repertoire. "Joan" was only performed a few times, and "The Pirate Song" not at all. Prior to the Hopes and Fears recording session, Cutler rewrote the lyrics for "Joan" as a homage to Joan of Arc, and those for "The Pirate Song", but once again there were objections from the feminist faction within Henry Cow. Krause, however, supported the new lyrics and both songs were recorded at Sunrise Studios with the revised texts.

Stewart Mason wrote at AllMusic that the album's longest track, "In Two Minds" is the closest Art Bears came to playing "conventional rock music". When Cutler was asked in an interview in 2004 whether the song was a "homage" to the Who, he replied, "It would be hard to deny the connection. It is so obviously a reference. I was certainly directly influenced in my youth by The Who – and in particular by Keith Moon."

== Album title ==
Hopes and Fears derived its name from the following conversation between Charion and Hermes in Satirical Sketches: Charon Sees Life by Lucian of Samosata (quoted in the booklet accompanying the CD release of the album):

| Charion | All I can see is a complicated muddle – a world full of utter confusion. Their towers are like beehives in which every bee has a sting of his own and uses it against his neighbour – and some are like wasps, preying on the weaker members of the community. But what are those dim shapes flying around them? |
| Hermes | Hopes and Fears, Charon... |

== CD reissues ==
- Hopes and Fears was reissued on CD in 1992 by Recommended Records with three extra tracks.
- The album was also reissued in 2004 in The Art Box, a 6xCD box set of all Art Bears releases with live and unreleased tracks, plus remixes by other musicians.

== Reception ==
Professional ratings
Review scores
| Source | Rating |
|---|---|
| AllMusic | 4.5/5 stars |
| Christgau's Record Guide | B |
| DownBeat | 5/5 stars |

In a review at AllMusic, Stewart Mason called Hopes and Fears "one of the art rock masterpieces of the 1970s". He said the album has the "politically poten[cy]" of Henry Cow, but is "more poetic and provocative". Mason was impressed with Cutler's diverse drumming and the range of sounds Frith was able to produce with his guitars. He selected "In Two Minds" and "Moeris, Dancing" as the album's standout tracks.

Music journalist Ian Penman wrote in New Musical Express in December 1978 that Hopes and Fears is a "mostly cheering example of a music with a clear and refreshed perspective". He described it as "a marriage of ideals – the 'humanity' of Slapp Happy with the heretic utopianism of Henry Cow", and suggested that it could be called "mirthful Marxism".

Reviewing the album in the June 1979 issue of DownBeat, Frank-John Hadley opined that Hopes and Fears "is a staggeringly literate, uncompromising and entertaining work". He said there are echoes of Igor Stravinsky, Frank Zappa, Derek Bailey, Michael Tippett and traditional British folk music on the album that explores European free form, classical and rock music. Hadley stated:

Art Bears are concerned with music that reflects their personal attitudes and lifestyle; they, like Sun Ra and Carla Bley, are free of the doctrines and whims of the music industry and remain totally responsible for their recorded efforts. The music business and listening public must meet them on their own terms.

== Track listing ==
Recorded by Henry Cow at Sunrise Studio, Kirchberg, Switzerland, 15–29 January 1978; and by Art Bears at Kaleidophon, London, 15–18 March 1978.

Side one – Áhá: Palace courtyard
| No. | Title | Writer(s) | Artist | Length |
|---|---|---|---|---|
| 1. | "On Suicide" | Brecht, Eisler | Henry Cow | 1:26 |
| 2. | "The Dividing Line" | Cutler, Frith, Cooper | Henry Cow | 4:11 |
| 3. | "Joan" | Cutler, Frith | Henry Cow | 3:05 |
| 4. | "Maze" | Cutler, Frith | Henry Cow | 5:05 |
| 5. | "In Two Minds" | Cutler, Frith | Henry Cow | 8:45 |

Side two – Mer: Irrigated land
| No. | Title | Writer(s) | Artist | Length |
|---|---|---|---|---|
| 6. | "Terrain" | Frith | Art Bears | 3:49 |
| 7. | "The Tube" | Cutler, Frith | Art Bears | 3:05 |
| 8. | "The Dance" | Cutler, Frith | Art Bears | 5:09 |
| 9. | "The Pirate Song" | Cutler, Hodgkinson | Henry Cow | 1:28 |
| 10. | "Labyrinth" | Cutler, Hodgkinson | Henry Cow | 2:15 |
| 11. | "Riddle" | Cutler, Frith | Henry Cow | 2:49 |
| 12. | "Moeris, Dancing" ("Moeris Dancing" on CD releases) | Frith | Henry Cow | 5:08 |
| 13. | "Piers" | Cutler, Frith | Art Bears | 2:10 |

1992 CD re-issue bonus tracks
| No. | Title | Writer(s) | Artist | Length |
|---|---|---|---|---|
| 14. | "Collapse" | Cutler, Frith | Art Bears | 4:03 |
| 15. | "All Hail!" | Cutler, Frith | Art Bears | 4:48 |
| 16. | "Coda to Man and Boy" | Cutler, Frith | Art Bears | 7:12 |

=== Bonus track notes ===
- Track 14 from the B-side of the Art Bears 7" single "Rats & Monkeys" (1979) – recorded at Kaleidophon Studios, London, Winter 1979.
- Track 15 from Recommended Records Sampler (1982) – recorded at Kaleidophon Studios, London, Winter 1979.
- Track 16 from a 7" single given free to subscribers of The World as It Is Today (1981) – a coda to the Art Bears track "Man and Boy" from Winter Songs (1979), recorded live at Cantù, Italy, 30 May 1979.
- "Collapse" and "All Hail!" are inverted in the CD liner notes.

== Personnel ==
- Fred Frith – guitars, violin, viola, harmonium, xylophone, piano, bass guitar on "Terrain" and "The Tube"
- Chris Cutler – drums, percussion, noise
- Dagmar Krause – voice

=== Guests (from Henry Cow) ===
- Tim Hodgkinson – organ, clarinet, piano on "The Pirate Song"
- Lindsay Cooper – bassoon, oboe, soprano recorder
- Georgie Born – bass guitar, cello, vocals on "Maze"

=== Additional personnel ===
- Peter Blegvad – bass guitar on "Coda to Man and Boy"
- Marc Hollander – piano on "Coda to Man and Boy"

=== Sound and art work ===
- Produced by Art Bears and Etienne Conod
- Cover art by E. M. Thomas, assisted by Graham Keatley, Charlotte Sainsbury, Doug Kierdorf and Jane Colling (figures on the original LP cover)

== Works cited ==
- Cutler, Chris, ed. (2009). "The Road: Volumes 6–10". The 40th Anniversary Henry Cow Box Set (box set booklet). Henry Cow. London: Recommended Records.
- Piekut, Benjamin (2019). Henry Cow: The World Is a Problem. Duke University Press. ISBN 978-1-47800-405-9.
