= Moeris, Dancing =

Instrumental by Art Bears

from the album Hopes and Fears
- Released: 15 May 1978
- Recorded: 15– 29 January 1978
- Studio: Sunrise, Kirchberg, Switzerland
- Genre: Avant-rock, progressive rock
- Length: 5:08
- Label: Recommended
- Composer: Fred Frith
- Producers: Henry Cow; Etienne Conod

"Moeris, Dancing" ("Moeris Dancing" on CD releases) is a 1978 instrumental composed by Fred Frith for the English avant-rock group Henry Cow. It was recorded in January 1978 by Henry Cow, but was released on the Art Bears's debut album, Hopes and Fears in May that year.

== Background ==
Henry Cow went to Switzerland in January 1978 to record their next album. They had planned on including "Erk Gah", a 20-minute composition by Tim Hodgkinson that the band had performed live several times, but never recorded in the studio. Hodgkinson had been unhappy with the original lyrics and rewrote them for the Swiss recording sessions. The rest of the band rejected the revised lyrics and asked Chris Cutler to write new lyrics for the piece. Cutler was unable to do so in the short period of time left before the recording sessions were due to begin, and "Erk Gah" was not recorded. Short of new material to replace "Erk Gah", Cutler wrote texts for a selection of short songs that Frith had composed.

Henry Cow included the new songs in the Swiss recording sessions, but when they returned to London, some of the members of the band were unhappy about the predominance of song-oriented material. Hodgkinson, Lindsay Cooper and Georgie Born felt that what they had recorded did not represent Henry Cow's goals and should not be released. Cutler and Frith were upset that the material they had composed was considered not good enough for Henry Cow, and as a compromise, it was agreed that two albums would be made: the songs (including "Moeris, Dancing") would be released by Frith, Cutler and Dagmar Krause as Art Bears, and the instrumental compositions they had recorded would be released later by Henry Cow. The newly formed Art Bears recorded four more tracks in London in March 1978 to complete their debut album, Hopes and Fears. It was released in May 1978 with the rest of Henry Cow credited as guests.

Henry Cow's disagreements fractured the band, which resulted in their break up. Frith stated in a 2016 interview that the incident "led to our differences coming to—and staying on—the surface. It was time." To fulfil concert commitments, Henry Cow continued to perform as a group and toured Europe until July 1978. In August 1978 Henry Cow returned to Switzerland to record additional instrumental pieces for their last album, Western Culture, after which the group disbanded. Art Bears continued until 1981, performing in Europe and recording two more albums.

== Composition and structure ==
Most of "Moeris, Dancing" has a time signature of 15/8, with some "intricate syncopations and accentuation". It begins with the composition's main theme performed by synchronised guitar and wordless vocals (oriental-style nasal "ah's"). It is followed by a fast melody in 15/8 and a slower "chorus" with acoustic and electric guitars, and a "droning base". This is followed by "snaking melodic lines" played by synchronised violin and acoustic guitar, another "chorus", some more violin and acoustic guitar melodic lines, and then the opening theme again.

The composition ends with a two-minute coda that features "sustained violin (and probably cello)" "playing slow glissandi, rising and falling approximately a half tone centred around F# in different octaves." Accompanying the strings in the coda is a "rhythm continuum" of bongo drums and bells that was also used in "Labyrinth", another track from Hopes and Fears.

Alessandro Monti stated that "Moeris, Dancing" has "clear and undisguised" (chiari e non mascherati) elements of Balkan and Indian folk music. Frith explained that some of his compositions, like "Moeris, Dancing", were influenced by Balkan music because when he started studying at Cambridge University he was a folk guitarist and was friends with a Yugoslav teacher. Another influence was the English translation of Béla Bartók: An Analysis of His Music, a book on the Hungarian composer Béla Bartók by Hungarian music theorist Ernő Lendvai.

== Reception ==
In a review of Hopes and Fears at AllMusic, Stewart Mason called "Moeris, Dancing" a "puckish instrumental". Reviewing the album in Ground and Sky, Dominique Leone described the piece as "joyous polyrhythm" that could have come from a Magma album. At Pitchfork, Leone wrote that "Moeris, Dancing" reminds him of the Belgium avant-prog group, Univers Zero and the way they deploy Eastern European folk harmonies and rhythms. In another review of Hopes and Fears in Ground and Sky, Gary Niederhoff called "Moeris, Dancing" the album's "highlight", and described the track's extended coda as "an eerie fade out".

Janne Yliruus also felt that "Moeris, Dancing" is the highlight of Hopes and Fears. Writing on the Finnish progressive music website, Pienemmät Purot he called the 15/8 melody "absolutely delightful" (kerrassaan ihastuttava). Yliruus added that this song laid the foundation for Frith's subsequent music, especially on two of his solo albums, Gravity and Speechless, and later in his 2008 band, Cosa Brava.

Nicole V. Gagné stated in her 1990 book, Sonic Transports: New Frontiers in Our Music that "Moeris, Dancing" is one of the "strong[est]" pieces on Hopes and Fears. She said it

stands out for its weird finale, a coup unique in Frith’s music: He sits for a full two minutes – a long time, especially for a five-minute piece – on a noisy stretch of Cutler’s percussion ... Unexpected violin crescendi counterbalance the minimalist effect: They hold your attention, teasing you to anticipate something more, while the music slowly and inexorably fades away.

Frith considered "Moeris, Dancing" to be one of his "unusual" compositions. When he moved to New York City in 1979, he was surprised and "flattered" to see several musicians, including Bill Laswell and Fred Maher, rehearsing the piece in a basement. Frith recalled, "That's already unusual enough that somebody else would want to do this stuff." Frith, Laswell and Maher later went on to form the experimental rock band, Massacre in 1980.

== Personnel ==
Sourced from Piekut, Garmo and Yliruusi.

- Fred Frith – acoustic and electric guitars, violin
- Chris Cutler – drums, bongos, bells
- Dagmar Krause – voice

== Live performances ==
"Moeris, Dancing" was performed live by Art Bears several times in 1979. The band only went on one tour, which was to Italy, France, Belgium and Czekoslovakia in April and May 1979. Known performances of the instrumental include the following:

- 1 May 1979 at the second Rock in Opposition Festival at Teatro Dell'Elfo in Milan, Italy
- 16 May 1979 at Théâtre Municipa in Charleville-Mézières, France

== Works cited ==
- Gagné, Nicole V. (1990). Sonic Transports: New Frontiers in Our Music. De Falco Books. ISBN 978-0-9625145-0-0.
- Garmo, Trond Einar (2020). Henry Cow: An Analysis of Avant Garde Rock. London: ReR Megacorp / November Books. ISBN 978-0-95601-84-4-1.
- Piekut, Benjamin (2019). Henry Cow: The World Is a Problem. Duke University Press. ISBN 978-1-47800-405-9.
