= Live in Trondheim, Berlin & Limoges, Vol. 2 =

Album by Fred Frith and Chris Cutler

Live album by Chris Cutler and Fred Frith
- Released: 1994
- Recorded: France, 13 December 1979; Norway, 16 October 1991; Germany, 2 November 1991
- Genre: Experimental music, free improvisation
- Length: 66:52
- Label: Recommended (UK)

Chris Cutler and Fred Frith chronology
Live in Prague and Washington (1983)	Live in Trondheim, Berlin & Limoges, Vol. 2 (1994)	2 Gentlemen in Verona (2000)

Fred Frith chronology
Quartets (1994)	Live in Trondheim, Berlin & Limoges, Vol. 2 (1994)	The Art of Memory (1994)

Live in Trondheim, Berlin & Limoges, Vol. 2 (Note: "Vol. 2" in the title refers to this album being Frith and Cutler's second collaborative album. Some sources leave "Vol. 2" off the title.) is a 1994 live album of improvised experimental music by Chris Cutler and Fred Frith. It was recorded in Limoges, France on 13 December 1979; at the Nordlydd Contemporary Music Festival in Trondheim, Norway on 16 October 1991; and in Tacheles, Berlin, Germany on 2 November 1991. The album was released by Recommended Records in 1994. It was Frith and Cutler's second collaborative album.

The Limoges recording was originally released as "Limoges" on a limited edition 7-inch single in 1983 and given to subscribers of Frith and Cutler's first collaborative album, Live in Prague and Washington (1983).

== Reception ==
Professional ratings
Review scores
Source	Rating
AllMusic	4/5 stars
Babyblaue Seiten	11/15 stars

In a review at AllMusic, Rick Anderson described Live in Trondheim, Berlin & Limoges, Vol. 2 as "arrythmic ... without anything approaching melody", but "never unapproachable". He added that there is "something sweet-natured" about the "weird, sumptuous and virtuosic noise" Cutler and Frith make, and felt that even listeners not partial to noise music should have no trouble appreciating the "textural complexity" of their "endless inventiveness".

== Track listing ==
All music by Chris Cutler and Fred Frith.

No.	Title	Venue and date	Length
1.	"Artcore"	Trondheim, Norway, 16 October 1991	24:37
2.	"Webcore"	Berlin, Germany, 2 November 1991	14:50
3.	"You Might Hear Some Traffic's Noise"	Berlin, Germany, 2 November 1991	14:04
4.	"Nothing"	Nowhere (Note: Track 4 ("Nothing") is 3 minutes of silence; the venue is given as "Nowhere".)	3:00
5.	"Meltdown"	Limoges, France, 13 December 1979 (Note: Track 5 ("Meltdown") was sourced from a scratched 7-inch single of the original release of "Limoges" in 1983. "Limoges"'s original tape masters (probably a cassette tape) had been lost.)	10:21

Sources: Liner notes, Discogs, Fred Frith discography.

== Personnel ==
- Chris Cutler – drums, electrics, flotsam
- Fred Frith – guitar, bass guitar, violin ("Meltdown"), jetsam

Sources: Liner notes, Discogs, Fred Frith discography.

=== Sound and artwork ===
- Trondheim concert recorded by Bjørn Olav Sjøholt
- Berlin concert recorded by Rainer Robben
- Limoges concert recorded by James Dupron
- Edited and mastered by Chris Cutler and Dominique Brethes in London, May 1994
- "Meltdown" edited by Steve Rickard
- "Meltdown" mastered by Bill Sharp at DYS in Denver, Colorado
- CD cover, artwork, and photography by Chris Cutler

Sources: Liner notes, Discogs, Fred Frith discography.
