= P53 (band) =

Experimental music group

p53
- Origin: Germany
- Genres: Experimental, free improvisation
- Years active: 1994, 1997, 2006
- Labels: Recommended
- Past members: Chris Cutler; Marie Goyette; Zygmunt Krauze; Lutz Glandien; Otomo Yoshihide; Jon Rose; Zeena Parkins

p53 was an experimental music group commissioned by English percussionist Chris Cutler to play at the 25th Frankfurt Jazz Festival in Germany in September 1994. Their performance was recorded and released by Recommended Records in 1996 on a live album entitled p53. The group reassembled in May 1997 to play at the Angelica International Festival of contemporary music in Bologna, Italy. In November 2006 an orchestral version with three soloists, Jon Rose, Zeena Parkins and Chris Cutler performed with the BBC Scottish Symphony Orchestra in Glasgow, Scotland, which was recorded and broadcast by the BBC in March 2007. This version was performed again at the Opera House in Milan in 2014 with the Orchestra de Teatro Communale, with soloists Daan Vandewalle and Thomas Dimuzio.

p53 was a musical improvisational project that centred on the music of two classical grand pianists, accompanied by percussion, homemade guitar, turntable scratching, and real-time sampling/processing of the pianists.

== History ==
In 1994 English percussionist Chris Cutler was asked by the organisers of the 25th Frankfurt Jazz Festival in Germany as to whether he had a project for the event. Cutler said "yes" and took the opportunity to try out a new musical idea involving "real-time montaging" that he had been contemplating. He used the festival's generous budget to form a quintet of musicians from around the world. Billed as "The Chris Cutler Project" before there was time to give it its name, p53 consisted of Cutler (percussion, electronics), German classical pianist Marie Goyette (grand piano), Polish classical pianist and composer Zygmunt Krauze (grand piano), German composer and performer Lutz Glandien (samples, real-time processing), and Japanese composer and multi-instrumentalist Otomo Yoshihide (turntables, homebuilt guitar).

p53's performance at the Frankfurt Jazz Festival was filmed and later broadcast several times on German television. An album of the concert called p53 was also released by Recommended Records in 1996. In May 1997 p53, with the same lineup, performed for the second time at the Angelica International Festival of contemporary music in Bologna in Italy. An extract from this performance appeared on the Angelica 1997 compilation CD.

The orchestral version was first performed in November 2006, in Glasgow, with the BBC Scottish Symphony Orchestra, conducted by Ilan Volkov. Volkov also conducted it in Bologna in 2014, at the Angelica Festival with the Orchestra del Teatro Communale, where the soloists were Daan Vandewalle and Thomas Dimuzio.

A chamber version of the piece was performed at the Techtonics festival in Tel Aviv in November 2014, with soloists Maya Dunietz, Tim Hodgkinson and Chris Cutler, under the direction of Ilan Volkov.

== Music ==
The instrumentation of the original p53 project consisted of two grand pianos, amplified turntables, a homemade electric guitar, percussion, electronics and real time processing. One of the pianists was instructed to play "a few small sections from the classical repertoire", in any way and at any tempo, while the other musicians were free to improvise around them, under certain dramaturgical rules. Glandien periodically played back amplified and distorted live samples of the pianists.

== Name ==
The group's name was taken from the p53 tumour suppressor gene (Note: p53 is actually a protein encoded by the Tp53 gene, but the p53 CD liner-notes refer to it as a gene.) that was discovered in 1979 by David P. Lane and others. Because of its role in preventing cancer, the gene has been described as "the guardian of the genome"

== Members ==
1994 and 1997 lineup

- Chris Cutler – drums, objects, low grade electronics
- Marie Goyette – grand piano
- Zygmunt Krauze – grand piano
- Otomo Yoshihide – turntables, homebuilt guitar
- Lutz Glandien – computer, samples, real-time processing

2006 lineup

- Chris Cutler – percussion
- Jon Rose – violin
- Zeena Parkins – harp

== Discography ==
=== Albums ===
- p53 (1996, CD, Recommended Records, U.K.)

=== Appears on ===
- Various artists: Angelica 1997 (1998, CD, Dischi di Angelica, Italy) – includes one p53 track
