= File Under Popular =

1985 book by Chris Cutler

- First edition cover, November Books, 1985
- Author: Chris Cutler
- Illustrator: Graham Keatley; Mary Thomas
- Language: English
- Subject: Musicology
- Publisher: November Books (United Kingdom); Autonomedia (United States)
- Publication date: 1985 (United Kingdom); 1992 (United States)
- Publication place: United Kingdom
- Media type: Print (Paperback)
- Pages: 224 pp (United Kingdom); 184 pp (United States)
- ISBN: 0-946423-01-6
- OCLC: 12441929

File Under Popular: Theoretical and Critical Writings on Music is a collection of seven essays on the political theory of popular music written by English percussionist, lyricist and music theorist, Chris Cutler. The essays were written between 1978 and 1983, four of them in response to requests and the rest unprompted. Two of the essays were first published in two German publications, and two were originally presented by Cutler at two international symposia on popular music. The book was first published in 1985 in London by November Books, the publishing wing of Cutler's independent record label, Recommended Records. It was also published in Polish, German and Japanese.

Rock critic and sociologist Simon Frith described File Under Popular as "A stirringly aggressive antidote to contemporary pop cynicism."

== Essays ==
1. "What is Popular Music?"
2. "The Realm of Lightning / Black Music in a White World / Sun Ra, a Life Work"
3. "Living in the Electric: The Residents"
4. "Phil Ochs and Elvis Presley"
5. "Necessity and Choice in Musical Forms: Concerning Musical and Technical Means and Political Needs"
6. "Progressive Rock in the UK: What Was Unique to the Development of Rock and Electric Music in the UK?"
7. "Progressive Music, Progressive Politics?"

=== Essay notes ===
- "What is Popular Music?" was a paper written and presented by Cutler at an International Association for the Study of Popular Music (IASPM) conference in 1983.
- "Living in the Electric: The Residents" was written in 1980 for a German publication Rocksession; a postscript was written for this collection in 1983.
- "Phil Ochs and Elvis Presley" was written in 1978 in response to Ochs's suicide in 1976, his public obsession with Presley and the connection between the two.
- Parts I and III of "Necessity and Choice in Musical Forms" were derived from an address given by Cutler at the Popular Music Research Symposium at Exeter in September 1982, and at the Festival des Politischen Liedes in East Berlin in February 1982 respectively; Part II is a free-standing bridge linking Parts I and III, written for this collection in 1983.
- "Progressive Rock in the UK" was written for publication in the former German Democratic Republic; a postscript was written for this collection in 1983.

== Synopsis ==
The essays in File Under Popular tackle the subject of "popular music", what it is, its origins and the political and marketing forces behind it. Cutler charts the history of music and how it was changed by written notation and then recording technology. Three of the essays dwell specifically on individual musicians and groups, namely Sun Ra, The Residents, Phil Ochs and Elvis Presley, but their stories are told within the context of the evolution of music. "Necessity and Choice in Musical Forms" is the first sketch of an analytical theory that shows how memory systems underpin the forms that music can take; part III of this essay is a personnel memoir of Cutler's that explains how his former band, Henry Cow functioned outside the music industry and their involvement in the establishment of Rock in Opposition. The last two essays deal with the development of progressive rock in the United Kingdom, its significance and the politics behind it.

Cutler continued his analysis on "popular music" in 1986 in two articles, "Skill, Part 1: The Negative Case For Some New Music Technology" and "Skill, Part 2: Heavy Metal, Punk and the New Wave", published in the RēR Quarterly sound-magazine, Volume 1 Number 3 (1986) and Volume 2 Number 2 (1987), respectively. These articles were later reworked by Cutler into a single essay entitled "Skill", which was included in the 1996 expanded Japanese edition of File Under Popular.

== Background ==
File Under Popular was originally intended for publication in 1984 in what was then Czechoslovakia at the instigation of Josef Vlcek of the Prague-based non-profit arts organisation, Jazzová Sekce-Artforum. As the majority of these essays had not been published in English, Cutler decided to publish an English edition in London. The Czech edition was supposed to be published first, but it was delayed and the English edition appeared in 1985. Further delays and problems eventually resulted in the Czech edition being abandoned. File Under Popular was later also published in Polish, German and Japanese.

Cutler placed the following dedicatory in File Under Popular: "Since Jazzová & Josef remain the sine qua non of its publication, it must be to them & to their work, that this book is respectfully dedicated."

== Editions ==
- United Kingdom
  - First edition, November Books, 1985
  - Second edition, November Books, 1989
  - Revised second edition, November Books, 1992
- United States
  - Revised second edition, Autonomedia, 1992
- Germany, published as Texte zur populären Musik, translated by Kersten Glandien
  - First edition, Michael Schwinn, 1985
  - Revised second edition, Michael Schwinn, 1994
- Poland, published as O Muzyce Popularnej, translated by Ireneusz Socha
  - First edition, Zielona Sowa, 1985
  - Revised and expanded second edition, Zielona Sowa, 1999
- Japan, published as ファイル・アンダー・ポピュラー―ポピュラー音楽を巡る文化研究
  - First edition, Suisei Sha, 1985
  - Revised and expanded second edition, Suisei Sha, 1996

=== Edition notes ===
- The expanded second edition published in Poland contains an extra essay, "Plunderphonia".
- The expanded second edition published in Japan contains two extra essays, "Plunderphonia" and "Skill".
- "Plunderphonia" was first published in MusicWorks 60 in 1994.
- "Skill" was derived from two articles, "Skill, Part 1: The Negative Case For Some New Music Technology" and "Skill, Part 2: Heavy Metal, Punk and the New Wave", published in the RēR Quarterly sound-magazine, Volume 1 Number 3 (1986) and Volume 2 Number 2 (1987), respectively.

== Works cited ==
- Cutler, Chris (1985). File Under Popular: Theoretical and Critical Writings on Music. November Books. ISBN 0-946423-01-6.
