= P53 (album) =

p53

Live album by p53
- Released: 1996
- Recorded: 16 September 1994
- Venues: 25th Frankfurt Jazz Festival, Germany
- Genres: Experimental; free improvisation
- Length: 44:08
- Label: Recommended (UK)
- Producers: Chris Cutler, Lutz Glandien

p53 is a 1996 live album by experimental music group p53. It was their debut album and was recorded at the 25th Frankfurt Jazz Festival in Germany on 16 September 1994. It was released in 1996 in the United Kingdom by Recommended Records.

p53 was a musical improvisational project that involved two classical grand pianists, a percussionist, a homemade guitarist and turntablist, and a real-time sampler/processor.

== Music ==
The instrumentation of the p53 project consisted of two grand pianos, amplified turntables, a homemade electric guitar, percussion, electronics and real time processing. Cutler's interest in sampling and turntablism began when it became possible to "play" them as instruments, and not just "run them in". This led to the idea of "real-time montaging", which formed the basis of p53.

Cutler established p53 as a free improvisation project within a predetermined structure to investigate the notion of making "improvisation a compositional endeavour". Cutler wanted it to question the nature of music and how listening to music has changed. He wanted to "pit acoustic sounds and the classical music tradition", two grand pianos, against "electronic timbres and the contemporary sound world", amplified turntables, electric guitar, computer generated sounds and real-time processing. He also wanted to contrast the difference between "early 20th century concert listening and the channel-hopping aesthetic of the fin de siecle '90's".

The pianists were instructed to play "a few small sections from the classical repertoire", in any way and at any tempo, while the other musicians were free to, according to Rick Anderson of AllMusic, "romp around them wreaking gleeful havoc". Glandien periodically played back amplified and distorted live samples of the pianists, making them, in effect, human samplers, providing raw material for him to manipulate.

== Reception ==
Professional ratings
Review scores
Source	Rating
AllMusic	4/5 stars
Wired	favourable

Peter L. Herb of Wired magazine described p53 as a "surrealist adventure that must have been stunning to witness". He added that "the disc's transitions from sonic tranquillity to chaos and back are unpredictable and delightfully abrupt. It's comforting that someone somewhere is still ignoring musical orthodoxy." Rick Anderson of AllMusic said while p53 is not the "stuff for everyone", "for those with ears to hear, [it] is one of the most enjoyable albums to come from the avant-garde scene in years."

== Track listing ==
1. "p53" (Cutler, Goyette, Krauze, Glandien, Yoshihide) – 44:08

== Personnel ==
- Chris Cutler – drums, objects, low grade electronics
- Marie Goyette – grand piano
- Zygmunt Krauze – grand piano
- Otomo Yoshihide – turntables, homebuilt guitar
- Lutz Glandien – computer, samples, real-time processing

=== Production and artwork ===
- Recorded at the 25th Frankfurt Jazz Festival, Germany on 16 September 1994
- Edited by Chris Cutler and Dominique Brethes at Wolf Studios, London
- Mastered by Chris Cutler and Lutz Glandien at Elsenstudio, Berlin
- Cover artwork by Peter Blegvad
- Graphic design by Jonathan Crossland
- Liner notes by Chris Cutler
