= Live in Prague and Washington =

Album by Fred Frith and Chris Cutler

Live album by Chris Cutler and Fred Frith
- Released: 1983
- Recorded: Prague, 25 May 1979; Washington, D.C., 20 December 1979
- Genres: Experimental music, free improvisation
- Length: 72:46 (CD release)
- Label: Recommended (UK)

Chris Cutler and Fred Frith chronology
| Live in Prague and Washington (1983) | Live in Trondheim, Berlin & Limoges, Vol. 2 (1994) |

Fred Frith chronology
| Cheap at Half the Price (1983) | Live in Prague and Washington (1983) | French Gigs (1983) |

Live in Prague and Washington (Live in Moscow, Prague & Washington on CD releases) is a live album of improvised experimental music by Chris Cutler and Fred Frith. It was recorded at the 8th Prague "Jazz Days" Festival in Prague in former Czechoslovakia on 25 May 1979, and at the DC Space in Washington, D.C., on 20 December 1979. The album was released by Recommended Records in 1983 on a 45 rpm 12" LP. It was Frith and Cutler's first collaborative duo album.

Subscribers to the Live in Prague and Washington LP received a limited edition 7-inch single of a 1979 Cutler and Frith concert recorded in Limoges, France. This recording was added to their next collaborative album, Live in Trondheim, Berlin & Limoges, Vol. 2 (1994).

In 1990 Recommended Records re-issued Live in Prague and Washington on CD with a Cuttler and Frith Moscow concert added, and retitled Live in Moscow, Prague & Washington. The new recording was made at the Culture Palace S.P.Gorbunov in Moscow on 31 May 1989.

== Reception ==
Professional ratings
Review scores
| Source | Rating |
|---|---|
| AllMusic | 3/5 stars |
| Babyblaue Seiten | 12/15 stars |
| Cadence | favourable |

In a review of the CD release of the album in the improvised jazz and blues magazine Cadence, Carl Baugher wrote that this type of music "truly defies categorization", and that while it has elements of free jazz and classical music structures, "Frith and Cutler demand to be evaluated on their own terms". Baugher said that "Moscow" has moments that are "riveting" and others that are "distracted impersonal textures". He called "Prague" the album's "most interesting composition" in terms of structure and improvisation, adding that "tonality is hinted at but ... seldom used". Baugher described "Washington" as "strangely controlled and peaceful" compared to the other pieces. Baugher declared Live in Moscow, Prague & Washington "an unqualified success", and stated that more CDs like this would "make the world of improvised music a more interesting place".

In her 1990 book, Sonic Transports: New Frontiers in Our Music, Nicole V. Gagné wrote that the Prague concert credit "4500 Czechs: ambiance and opinions" is "no joke", as the audience contributes to the music. She said, "The murmuring undercurrent of voices, the whistling, clapping, and crying out, all affected the musicians and prompted several of the things they did."

== Track listing ==
All music by Chris Cutler and Fred Frith.

=== 1983 LP release: Live in Prague and Washington ===
Side I
| No. | Title | Length |
|---|---|---|
| 1. | "Live in Prague (part 1)" |

Side II
| No. | Title | Length |
|---|---|---|
| 2. | "Live in Prague (cont.)" |
| 3. | "Washington" |

=== 1990 CD release: Live in Moscow, Prague & Washington ===
| No. | Title | Length |
|---|---|---|
| 1. | "Moscow" | 42:41 |
| 2. | "Prague" | 27:14 |
| 3. | "Washington" | 2:48 |

Sources: AllMusic, Liner notes, Discogs, Fred Frith discography.

== Personnel ==
- Chris Cutler – drums, electrified drums, contact mics, telephone mouthpieces, jetsam
- Fred Frith – guitars, Vox Organ guitar, table guitars, adapted guitars, bass guitar, six-string bass guitar, violin, voice, flotsam
- 4500 Czechs (Prague concert) – ambiance, opinions (Note: At the Prague concert, microphones where placed in the auditorium which recorded audience reaction to the music.)

Sources: Liner notes, Discogs, Fred Frith discography.

=== Sound and artwork ===
- Moscow concert analogue mastering by Bill Sharp
- Prague concert recorded by Jiri Munzar, with live mix by E. M. Thomas
- Washington concert recorded by John Page
- Photography by Jiří Kučera, E. M. Thomas
- Cover design by E. M. Thomas

Sources: Liner notes, Discogs.
