= Art Bears =

English avant-rock group

- Art Bears in 1978 (from left: Chris Cutler, Fred Frith, Dagmar Krause)

Background information
- Origin: England
- Genre: Avant-rock
- Years active: 1978–1981
- Labels: Recommended, Ralph
- Spinoffs: News from Babel
- Spinoff of: Henry Cow
- Past members: Chris Cutler; Fred Frith; Dagmar Krause

Art Bears were an English avant-rock group formed during the disbandment of Henry Cow in 1978 by three of its members, Chris Cutler (percussion, texts), Fred Frith (guitar, bass guitar, violin, keyboards) and Dagmar Krause (vocals; also formerly of Slapp Happy). The group released three studio albums between 1978 and 1981 – Hopes and Fears, Winter Songs and The World as It Is Today – and toured Europe in 1979. The band disbanded following the release of The World as It Is Today. Cutler, Frith and Krause would continue working together after the band's disbandment, and Cutler and Frith performed as Art Bears Songbook, an Art Bears "review" project, for two festival performances in 2008 and 2010.

== Biography ==
Art Bears were formed during the recording of Henry Cow's fifth album in January 1978. Disagreements had arisen over the album's content: Frith, Cutler and Krause favoured song-oriented material, while the rest of the band preferred instrumental compositions. As a compromise, Frith, Cutler and Krause agreed to release the songs already recorded on their own album, Hopes and Fears, under the name Art Bears, with the rest of Henry Cow credited as guests. The instrumental material appeared later on the final Henry Cow album, Western Culture (1979).

Hopes and Fears (1978) thus consisted of Henry Cow songs with the addition of new Art Bears material recorded later by Frith, Cutler and Krause. Towards the end of 1978, Art Bears returned to the studio to record their first "true" album, Winter Songs (1979). It comprised fourteen short songs composed by Frith around texts by Cutler inspired by carvings on the stylobate of Amiens Cathedral.

In December 1978, Art Bears joined Rock in Opposition (RIO), and toured Europe in April and May 1979. For the tour, they were joined by Peter Blegvad (ex-Slapp Happy, guitar, bass guitar, voice) and Marc Hollander (of Aksak Maboul, keyboards, clarinet). They rehearsed at the Cold Storage Recording Studios in Brixton, before leaving for Italy in late April. They performed in Italy, France, Belgium and Czechoslovakia, including an RIO festival on 1 May in Milan. Some of the songs recorded during the tour were later added to the CD release of Hopes and Fears and The Art Box (2004), a box set of Art Bears material.

The band returned to the studio in 1980 to make one final album, The World as It Is Today (1981), before splitting up. In October 1983 Frith, Cutler and Krause reunited again when they joined Duck and Cover, a commission from the Berlin Jazz Festival, for a performance of the "Berlin Programme" in West Berlin, followed by another in February 1984 in East Berlin, and one at the ICA in London the following August. The "Berlin Programme" included fragments of three Art Bears songs.

In 1993 Frith, Cutler and Krause worked together again on a song project, Domestic Stories (1993) by Chris Cutler and Lutz Glandien, with saxophonist Alfred Harth. While similar to Art Bears, the addition of Glandien's electronic music made Domestic Stories a distinctly different album.

=== Art Bears Songbook ===
An Art Bears "review" took place in May 2008 at the world premiere of the Art Bears Songbook at the 25th Festival International de Musique Actuelle de Victoriaville in Quebec. It was performed by Cutler (drums), Frith (guitar, bass guitar, violin, piano), Jewlia Eisenberg (voice), Carla Kihlstedt (violin, voice), Zeena Parkins (keyboards, accordion), Kristin Slipp (voice) and The Norman Conquest (sound manipulation). Krause was unable to participate, so Frith and Cutler decided to rework the trio's repertoire for an expanded group, with the voices of Eisenberg, Slipp and Kihlstedt replacing Krause's "eccentric and idiomatic delivery". The project was so-named because Frith and Cutler did not want it to be seen as an Art Bears reunion. According to All About Jazz the Art Bears Songbook was "not just a highlight, but the highlight of the [five-day] festival."

Another performance of the Art Bears Songbook took place at the third edition of the French Rock in Opposition event in Carmaux in September 2010. The line-up was the same as before, except that Krause, who had agreed to come out of retirement, replaced Eisenberg, who was ill.

== Music ==
Art Bears's music was often deeply political in content (reflecting the band's socialist leanings) and frequently avant-garde and experimental. They were more "song oriented" than Henry Cow, although much of the material on their debut album was actually written with the intention of being performed by the latter band.

Their music was "very dark in concept and in atmosphere". Reviewing The Art Box, BBC Music described it as: "Carefully wrought dissonances, angular folk tunes, sudden shifts in dynamics, dense layers of spectral drones, slabs of noise, topped off with Dagmar's strange, elastic Sprechstimme."

Krause's voice contributed significantly to the mood and character of the songs. Cutler said:

I don't write simple or obvious words, [...] they are not easy to sing. Dagmar had the amazing ability to make them make sense, to make them sound obvious. She sings from the inside and her accent helps to lift words out of their slots and give them a slightly resonant displacement. No one else could have done what Dagmar did on those LPs. I'm still amazed by her.

In "progressive" circles, the Art Bears were generally well received. AllMusic wrote: "Their life was fleeting, but the Art Bears wrote and recorded bold, challenging, idiosyncratic music that, despite its occasional difficulty, is ultimately very rewarding."

== Name ==
Art Bears took their name from a sentence in Jane Ellen Harrison's book Ancient Art and Ritual (1913): "Even to-day, when individualism is rampant, art bears traces of its collective, social origin". Chris Cutler explains that it was a deliberate out-of-context quote, but that "not too much should be read into this; it just sounds intriguing, has an animal in it, plays with ambiguity and is mildly ridiculous".

== Members ==
Former members

- Chris Cutler – drums, percussion, noise (1978–1980)
- Fred Frith – guitars, violin, viola, harmonium, xylophone, keyboards, bass guitar (1978–1980)
- Dagmar Krause – voice (1978–1980)

Touring members

- Peter Blegvad – bass guitar, guitar, voice (1979)
- Marc Hollander – keyboards, clarinet (1979)

== Discography ==
=== Studio albums ===
- Hopes and Fears, 1978
- Winter Songs, 1979
- The World as It Is Today, 1981

=== Compilations ===
- The Art Box, 2004 (6-CD box-set of all Art Bears releases, with live and unreleased tracks, plus remixes by other musicians)
- Art Bears Revisited, 2004 (2-CD of Art Bears tracks, remixed by other musicians – discs 4 and 5 of The Art Box)

=== 7" singles and EPs ===
- "Rats & Monkeys" / "Collapse", 1979
- "Coda to Man and Boy", 1981 (single-sided screened 7") – given free to subscribers of The World as It Is Today (1981)
- "All Hail", 1982 (flexi-7")

== See also ==
- Romantic Warriors II: A Progressive Music Saga About Rock in Opposition
