= Clearing (Fred Frith album) =

Studio album by Fred Frith
- Released: 2001
- Recorded: 1996, 2000
- Studio: Jankowski Studio, Stuttgart, Germany
- Genre: Experimental rock
- Length: 54:05
- Label: Tzadik (US)
- Producer: Fred Frith

Fred Frith chronology
2 Gentlemen in Verona (2000)	Clearing (2001)	Freedom in Fragments (2002)

Clearing is a guitar solo album by English guitarist, composer and improvisor Fred Frith. It was Frith's first solo guitar recording since Live in Japan (1982) and his first solo guitar studio recording since his landmark 1974 album Guitar Solos.

Clearing comprises eleven tracks of unaccompanied and improvised music played on prepared guitars by Frith. Ten of the tracks were recorded in Stuttgart, Germany in 1996 and 2000, and one was recorded live at the Konstrukcja w Procesie Festival VII in Bydgoszcz, Poland in 2000.

== Background ==
In 2000, John Zorn commissioned Frith to make a guitar solo album for Tzadik Records as a follow-up to his 1974 album, Guitar Solos. Using prepared guitars, Frith recorded Clearing in Stuttgart, Germany in July 2000 in a similar vein as Guitar Solos, revisiting areas explored on that album but not developed further at the time. He also included two additional tracks, "Gaifu Kaisei" and "This Earth is a Flower" that had been recorded earlier.

Frith used a variety of found objects when recording the album. On "Chains", Frith placed a lozenger tin on the guitar strings and dropped a chain into the tin. An acoustic sound was achieved on "Blue" by placing microphones close to the electric guitar strings. Chopsticks were jammed between the guitar strings on "Gaifu Kaisei". "Minimalism" was performed entirely by striking the guitar strings with drumsticks.

Frith dedicated four of the tracks on the album to:

- Bill Frisell – United States guitarist for the band Naked City, in which Frith played bass guitar;
- Andy Goldsworthy – British landscape sculptor and subject of the documentary film, Rivers and Tides (2001) for which Frith made the soundtrack, Rivers and Tides (2002);
- Akira Iijima – Japanese guitarist that appeared on Frith's Guitar Solos 3;
- Tomoko Itani – Japanese guitarist that appeared on a compilation of Japanese music, Welcome to Dreamland (1986) that Frith had produced.

== Reception ==
Professional ratings
Review scores
Source	Rating
AllMusic	4.5/5 stars
Tom Hull – on the Web	B+

AllMusic said this of the album:

For longtime Frith fans, Clearing is a no-brainer pickup, certainly the most thoroughly enjoyable of the albums spotlighting his guitar playing in many a year. But it's also a fine introduction to the work of one of the more outstanding and influential experimental guitarists of the last 30 years and an accessible entryway for newcomers. Recommended.

Derk Richardson, writing for CT Insider, commented: "Some tracks are delicate and fragile, some are dense thickets of sonic thistles, some tiptoe with elegance and grace, some bully their way through time. However abstract or heady, none achieve anything less than absorbing grandeur."

== Track listing ==
1. "White (for Andy Goldsworthy)" (Frith) – 9:28
2. "Open Ocean" (Frith) – 5:12
3. "Chains" (Frith) – 2:00
4. "The Bow Moon" (Frith) – 4:00
5. "Minimalism (for Tomoko Itani)" (Frith) – 5:07
6. "Not With Love But With Fear" (Frith) – 6:03
7. "Theatre" (Frith) – 10:09
8. "Gaifu Kaisei (in memory of Akira Iijima)" (Frith) – 2:50
9. "Road Movie" (Frith) – 2:12
10. "This Earth is a Flower" (Frith) – 3:52
11. "Blue (for Bill Frisell)" (Frith) – 3:12

== Personnel ==
- Fred Frith – prepared guitars

=== Sound and artwork ===
- Tracks 1-7,9,11 recorded by Peter Hardt at Jankowski Studio, Stuttgart, Germany, July 2000
- Track 8 recorded by Peter Hardt at Jankowski Studio, Stuttgart, Germany, January 1996
- Track 10 recorded live to DAT by Grzegorz Kazimierczak at the Konstrukcja w Procesie Festival VII, Bydgoszcz, Poland in association with Mózg and the International Artists' Museum, June 2000
- Sequenced and pre-mastered by Myles Boisen at Headless Buddha Mastering Lab, Oakland, California, December 2000
- Mastered by Allan Tucker at Foothill Digital, New York City
- Cover photo by Fred Frith.
