= French Gigs =

Live album by Lol Coxhill and Fred Frith
- Released: 1983
- Recorded: 1978; 1981
- Venues: • Musiques de Traverses festival, Maison de la Culture André Malraux, Reims, France; • M.J.C. Aliénor D'Aquitaine, Limoges, France; • Sainte Croix auditorium, Poitiers, France
- Genres: Experimental music; free improvisation
- Length: 48:32
- Label: AAA (France)

Fred Frith chronology
| Live in Prague and Washington (1983) | French Gigs (1983) | Who Needs Enemies? (1983) |

French Gigs is a 1983 live collaborative album of improvised experimental music by Lol Coxhill and Fred Frith. It was recorded live in France in Limoges and Poitiers in October 1978, and in Reims in 1981. The album was released on LP by AAA in 1983, on CD by AYAA in 1991, and again on CD by Klanggalerie in 2020. The 1991 release includes a new track recorded via correspondence in 1991–92 by Coxhill in London and Frith in Munich, while the 2020 release includes the extra 1991 track, plus another new track recorded in Aubervilliers, France in 1999, the last performance by Coxhill and Frith. The 2020 release was re-mastered by Myles Boison.

== Background ==
Fred Frith began playing with Lol Coxhill in the early 1970s, which introduced Frith to the London improvised music scene. Coxhill went on to perform as a guest with Henry Cow, a group Frith was a member of at the time, on several occasions between 1972 and 1977. In 1974 Frith also played with Coxhill in Welfare State, a British performance art group. Bill Smith and Dan Lander stated in their book Music Is Rapid Transportation that Coxhill's improvisation technique had a "lasting impact" on Frith.

In October 1978, shortly after Henry Cow split up in August that year, Frith and Coxhill undertook a short tour in France, playing in Limoges and Poitiers. Several years later in 1981, they participated in an unscheduled performance at a concert in Reims. The material on French Gigs was taken from the 1978 tour and the 1981 concert.

== Reception ==
Professional ratings
Review scores
| Source | Rating |
|---|---|
| AllMusic | 4/5 stars |
| The Wire | Favorable |

In a review of the LP release of French Gigs at AllMusic, Eugene Chadbourne compared the tone of Coxhill's soprano saxophone to that of Sidney Bechet, but added that Coxhill often explores contexts beyond that of traditional jazz. Chadbourne said Frith's tabletop guitars add "a magnificent sort of orchestral accompaniment" to Coxhill, and praised Frith's production for avoiding the trap of reducing the collection to "meaningless highlights". Chadbourne looked forward to a CD release of the album where he hoped that additional material would be added.

Reviewing the album in The Wire, Richard Scott said Coxhill and Frith cover a wide range of musical styles, making generic categorisation impossible. He described the recording as "sometimes expansive, beautiful, lush, sometimes dry, scratchy and obscure". He said the duo "pace around each other, provide contexts for each other, listen and respond in ways that rarely amount to any particular style or approach." Coxhill's saxophone at times sounds like bagpipes, and Frith's guitar like an orchestra, and "[a]s such there is not a lot to go on, and no particular reason why it should work as well as it does". Scott concluded: "It's great: one of the few recordings of improvisation that continues to beguile and seduce after several listens."

== Track listing ==
All tracks composed by Lol Coxhill and Fred Frith.

=== 1983 LP release ===
Side A
| No. | Title | Venue / date | Length |
|---|---|---|---|
| 1. | "Reims" | Musiques de Traverses festival, Maison de la Culture André Malraux, Reims, France / 1981 | 25:59 |

Side B
| No. | Title | Venue / date | Length |
|---|---|---|---|
| 1. | "Limoges 1" | M.J.C. Aliénor D'Aquitaine, Limoges, France / 26 October 1978 | 9:13 |
| 2. | "Poitiers" | Sainte Croix auditorium, Poitiers, France / 25 October 1978 | 9:52 |
| 3. | "Limoges 2" | M.J.C. Aliénor D'Aquitaine, Limoges, France / 26 October 1978 | 3:28 |

Sources: Liner notes, Discogs.

=== 1991 CD release ===
| No. | Title | Venue / date | Length |
|---|---|---|---|
| 1. | "Reims" | Musiques de Traverses festival, Maison de la Culture André Malraux, Reims, France / 1981 | 25:59 |
| 2. | "Limoges 1" | M.J.C. Aliénor D'Aquitaine, Limoges, France / 26 October 1978 | 9:13 |
| 3. | "Poitiers" | Sainte Croix auditorium, Poitiers, France / 25 October 1978 | 9:52 |
| 4. | "Limoges 2" | M.J.C. Aliénor D'Aquitaine, Limoges, France / 26 October 1978 | 3:28 |
| 5. | "München/London" | London (Coxhill) and Munich (Frith) / 1991–92 | 11:38 |

Sources: Liner notes, Discogs.

=== 2020 CD release ===
| No. | Title | Venue / date | Length |
|---|---|---|---|
| 1. | "Reims" | Musiques de Traverses festival, Maison de la Culture André Malraux, Reims, France / 1981 | 25:59 |
| 2. | "Limoges 1" | M.J.C. Aliénor D'Aquitaine, Limoges, France / 26 October 1978 | 9:13 |
| 3. | "Poitiers" | Sainte Croix auditorium, Poitiers, France / 25 October 1978 | 9:52 |
| 4. | "Limoges 2" | M.J.C. Aliénor D'Aquitaine, Limoges, France / 26 October 1978 | 3:28 |
| 5. | "München/London" | London (Coxhill) and Munich (Frith) / 1991–92 | 11:38 |
| 6. | "Aubervilliers" | Aubervilliers, France / 1999 | 7:04 |

Sources: Liner notes, Discogs.

== Personnel ==
- Lol Coxhill – soprano saxophone
- Fred Frith – guitar

Sources: Liner notes, Discogs.

=== Sound and artwork ===
- 1983 LP release
  - Track A1 – recorded by Dominique Diebold
  - Tracks B1, B3 – recorded by Jean Claude "James" Dupron; edited and mixed by Fred Frith
  - Track B2 – recorded by Michel Demily; edited and mixed by Fred Frith
- 1991 CD release
  - Tracks 1 to 4 – as for the 1983 LP release
  - Track 5 – soprano saxophone recorded by Lol Coxhill; guitar recorded by Benedykt Grodon; mixed by Jean-Maurice Rossel
- 2020 CD release
  - Tracks 1 to 5 – as for the 1991 CD release
  - Tracks 1 to 6 – re-mastered by Myles Boison
- Design – Benoît Proust, William Théry
- Photography – Lol Coxhill by Philippe Taillefer; Fred Frith by Gérard Richard

Sources: Liner notes, Discogs.

== Works cited ==
- Smith, Bill; Lander, Dan (2010). Music Is Rapid Transportation: ... From the Beatles to Xenakis. Charivari Press. ISBN 978-1-895166-04-0.
