= 2 Gentlemen in Verona =

Album by Fred Frith and Chris Cutler

Live album by Chris Cutler and Fred Frith
- Released: 4 April 2000
- Recorded: 16 April 1999
- Venue: Interzona, Verona, Italy
- Genre: Experimental music, free improvisation
- Length: 50:02
- Label: Recommended (UK)

Chris Cutler and Fred Frith chronology
Live in Trondheim, Berlin & Limoges, Vol. 2 (1994)	2 Gentlemen in Verona (2000)	The Stone: Issue Two (2007)

Fred Frith chronology
Traffic Continues (2000)	2 Gentlemen in Verona (2000)	Clearing (2001)

2 Gentlemen in Verona is a 2000 live album of improvised experimental music by Chris Cutler and Fred Frith. It was recorded Verona, Italy on 16 April 1999 and released by Recommended Records in April 2000. It was Frith and Cutler's third collaborative album.

The album title was derived from Shakespeare's play The Two Gentlemen of Verona, and the track names were taken from the play's act and scene titles. (Note: The following acts and scenes in the play were not used for the album's track names: Act 2, Scene V and VII, Act 3, Scene II, and Act 4, Scenes II–IV.)

== Reception ==
Professional ratings
Review scores
Source	Rating
All About Jazz	4.5/5 stars
AllMusic	4.5/5 stars

In a review of 2 Gentlemen in Verona at AllMusic, Thom Jurek described Cutler and Frith's performance as "a joyously brash and boisterous cacophony", and labelled the album "one of the greatest live duet improv recordings ever". Writing in All About Jazz, Glenn Astarita called Cutler and Frith's set in Verona a "fascinating live exhibition" of "multi-textured pastiches ... abstract rhythms, otherworldly effects and mind-bending dialogue". Astarita rated the album "Highly recommended".

Reviewing the album in The Wire, Philip Clark described 2 Gentlemen in Verona as a "feral modern classic". He said Frith's "massed sonorities and simple singsong patterns" are accompanied by the "noisy, byzantine complexity" of Cutler's drums that from time to time settle down to "stretchy rock beats and rigid marching patterns".

In The Washington Post Mike Joyce described the album as a "curious and quixotic excursion into freely improvised music", adding that despite the "odd sounds and surprising tangents", the duo remains on a "common wavelength, anticipating each other's moods and moves with quick speed and wit". Joyce wrote that anyone who has followed the career of Cutler and Frith will welcome this recording, but warned that the uninitiated may find it "unendurably indulgent".

David Ashcraft was more critical of the album. In a review in Exposé he wrote that this recording is "strictly for the hardcore fan of improvised exploration". He said that while it "showcases the improvisational talents" of Cutler and Frith, it is not without "hits and misses". Ashcraft felt that between "sublime moments of melody and emotion", there is "plenty of meandering and some dissonant sounds".

== Track listing ==
All music by Chris Cutler and Fred Frith.

No.	Title	Length
1.	"Act 1, Scene I: Enter Valentine and Proteus – Gavest Thou My Letter to Julia?"	2:45
2.	"Act 1, Scene II: Enter Julia and Lucetta – And Yet Methinks I Do Not Like This Tune (The Mean Is Drowned By Your Unruly Bass)"	2:13
3.	"Act 1, Scene III: Enter Antonio and Panthino – This Month I Have Been Hammering"	3:55
4.	"Act 2, Scene I: Enter Valentine and Speed – And Yet, I Was Last Chidden For Being Too Slow"	1:18
5.	"Act 2, Scene II: Enter Proteus and Julia – Have Patience, Gentle Julia"	2:59
6.	"Act 2, Scene III: Enter Launce (With His Dog Crab) – As Light as a Lilly and as Small as a Wand"	3:55
7.	"Act 2, Scene IV: Enter Valentine, Silvia, Thurio and Speed – We Have Conversed, and Spent Our Hours Together"	2:56
8.	"Act 2, Scene VI: Enter Proteus Solus – This Night He Meaneth With a Coded Ladder ..."	3:36
9.	"Act 3, Scene I: Enter Duke, Thurio and Proteus – Fostered, Illumin'd. Cherish'd, Kept Alive"	3:03
10.	"Act 4, Scene I: Enter Certain Outlaws – Fellows, Stand Fast: I See a Passenger"	2:31
11.	"Act 5, Scene I: Enter Eglamour – Fear Not, the Forest Is Not Three Leagues Off"	3:00
12.	"Act 5, Scene II: Enter Thurio, Proteus and Julia – But Well, When I Discourse of Love and Peace"	3:18
13.	"Act 5, Scene III: Enter Silvia and Outlaws – Come, Come, Be Patient"	2:56
14.	"Act 5, Scene IV: Enter Valentine – Forgive Them What They Have Committed Here"	3:41
15.	"Exeunt"	1:23
16.	"Encore"	6:33

Sources: Liner notes, Discogs, Fred Frith discography.

== Personnel ==
- Chris Cutler – drums, electrified drums, flotsam
- Fred Frith – electrified guitars, voice, jetsam

Sources: Liner notes, Discogs, Fred Frith discography.

=== Sound and artwork ===
- Concert recorded and photographed by Sergio Amadori
- Edited and mastered by Chris Cutler at Wolf Studios, London, and Studio Midi-Pyrénées, La Borde Basse, Caudeval, France
- Engineered by Dominique Brethes at Wolf Studios
- Engineered by Bob Drake at Studio Midi-Pyrénées
- CD cover and booklet design by Gregg Skerman

Sources: Liner notes, Discogs, Fred Frith discography.
