= Lutz Glandien =

German musician and composer

- Born: 1954 (age 71–72); Oebisfelde, German Democratic Republic
- Genres: Contemporary classical music, Electroacoustic music, Avant-rock
- Occupations: Composer, Musician
- Instruments: Keyboards, Samplers, Computers
- Years active: 1980s–present
- Label: Recommended
- Website: www.lutzglandien.com

Lutz Glandien (born 1954) is a German avant garde composer and musician based in Berlin. He has composed a number of classical and electroacoustic pieces, released four solo albums, and collaborated with English percussionist Chris Cutler to record two acclaimed avant-rock albums, Domestic Stories (1992) and p53 (1996).

Glandien has received several scholarships and awards, including the Voya Toncitch Prize at the International Piano Composition Contest in Paris in 1987 for his work entitled 365. He was described as "a major talent" by Facelift Magazine in 1994.

== Biography ==
Lutz Glandien was born in the small town of Oebisfelde in the former German Democratic Republic. At the age of nine years he started taking piano lessons, but abandoned them after a few years when he became more interested in rock music. While at school he founded a rock band, and his interest in music grew. After school he moved to Dresden to study economics at the Dresden University of Technology, where he also became a songwriter and pianist with a local music group. His interest in composition later led to him to study classical contemporary composition at the "Hanns Eisler" Music Academy in East Berlin. After graduating in 1987 he wrote a number of classical pieces for solo instruments, chamber ensemble and symphony orchestra.

Glandien's interest in experimentation, however, soon resulted in him deviating from conventional musical formats. "I was particularly annoyed by the artificial arrogance of [contemporary classical music], which had a paralysing effect on my creativity." He began building his own musical instruments for his compositions and produced numerous electroacoustic musical works, including Scenes From No Marriage, later released on CD in 1994. He also set up his own studio and created soundtracks for over 60 radiophonic pieces, documentary films, video performances, exhibitions and sound installations.

Glandien's exposure to avant-rock began in the early 1980s when he met English percussionist Chris Cutler from Henry Cow when Cutler performed at the Festival des Politischen Liedes (Festival of Political Song) in East Berlin. In 1989 and 1990 Cutler included several of Glandien's compositions in Recommended Records's RēR Quarterly sound-magazine. In 1991 Glandien wrote a piece for tape and percussion called Strange Drums, and asked Cutler to perform it at the International Festival of Electroacoustic Music in Berlin. This was followed by Trompose for tape, percussion and trombone which Cutler performed with trombonist Connie Bauer, and Turbo Mortale for triple tuba, percussion and electronics performed by Cutler and Berlin Philharmonic tuba player Michael Vogt at the Berlin Inventionen in 1992.

In 1991 Glandien and Cutler began working on a song cycle called Domestic Stories with music by Glandien and texts by Cutler that dealt with power relationships in marriage. Domestic Stories was recorded with Dagmar Krause (voice), Fred Frith (guitar and bass guitar) and Alfred Harth (saxophone and clarinet) and was Glandien and Cutler's first collaborative CD. In 1994 Glandien joined Cutler, pianists, Marie Goyette and Zygmunt Krauze, and turntablist Otomo Yoshihide in a project called p53 that was performed twice at the 25th Frankfurt Jazz Festival in Frankfurt, and again three years later at the Angelica Festival in Bologna, Italy.

Glandien continued with classical composition in the mid- to late-1990s with a number of his works being premiered across Germany. Some of these performance were collected on his solo CD, Lutz Glandien (1995). In the early 2000s Glandien recorded two CDs of "Virtualectric Stories", The 5th Elephant (2002) and Lost in Rooms (2003). They were both composed on computer, the former using fragments of drum and tuba tracks recorded in 1997 by Cutler and Vogt, and the latter incorporating speech fragments.

Glandien developed the concept of "Composing by Ear" and has been studying the tonal center in primate voices. He has also experimented with "virtual" and "recycled" music.

== Selected discography ==
For a more complete list, see the Lutz Glandien discography.

=== Solo ===
- Scenes From No Marriage (1994, CD, Recommended Records, UK)
- Lutz Glandien (1995, CD, Recommended Records, UK)
- The 5th Elephant (2002, CD, Recommended Records, UK)
- Lost in Rooms (2003, CD, Recommended Records, UK)
- Kyomei (2008, CD, Recommended Records, UK)

=== Collaborations and projects ===
Lutz Glandien and Chris Cutler

- Domestic Stories (1992, CD, Recommended Records, UK)

p53

- p53 (1996, CD, Recommended Records, UK)
