= Winter Songs (Art Bears album) =

Studio album by Art Bears
- Released: 1979
- Recorded: November–December 1978
- Studios: Sunrise, Kirchberg, Switzerland
- Genres: Avant-rock, post-punk
- Length: 38:07
- Label: Recommended (UK)
- Producers: Art Bears, Etienne Conod

Art Bears chronology
Hopes and Fears (1978)	Winter Songs (1979)	The World as It Is Today (1981)

Singles from Winter Songs
- 1. "Rats & Monkeys" b/w "Collapse" Released: 1979, Ralph Records

Alternative cover

Three Wheels sample
An audio sample from "Three Wheels"

Professional ratings
Review scores
Source	Rating
AllMusic	4/5 stars
Christgau's Record Guide	B+

Winter Songs is the second album by the English avant-rock group Art Bears. It was recorded at Sunrise Studio in Kirchberg, Switzerland between 22 November and 5 December 1978, and was released in 1979. It was Art Bears' first album to be recorded on their own, the bulk of their first album, Hopes and Fears having been recorded as Henry Cow. It was released by Ralph Records in the United States.

== Recording ==
Winter Songs comprises fourteen short songs composed by Fred Frith around texts by Chris Cutler that were based on carvings on the dado of the west facade of Amiens Cathedral in France. The whole album was recorded and mixed simultaneously, taking 14 days from start to finish. The group adopted an approach of creating the sound first and committing it to tape immediately, instead of leaving the sound detail to post-production mixing. This method used the studio as a compositional instrument, and Etienne Conod, the studio engineer at Sunrise Studio, played an important part in this process, becoming an indispensable member of the group.

== Track listing ==
All tracks are written by Fred Frith and Chris Cutler.

Side 1
No.	Title	Length
1.	"The Bath of Stars"	1:45
2.	"First Things First"	2:50
3.	"Gold"	1:41
4.	"The Summer Wheel"	2:47
5.	"The Slave"	3:38
6.	"The Hermit"	2:59
7.	"Rats and Monkeys"	3:24

Side 2
No.	Title	Length
1.	"The Skeleton"	3:11
2.	"The Winter Wheel"	3:06
3.	"Man and Boy"	3:21
4.	"Winter/War"	3:05
5.	"Force"	0:54
6.	"Three Figures"	1:51
7.	"Three Wheels"	3:35

== Personnel ==
- Fred Frith – guitars, keyboards, viola, violin, xylophone
- Chris Cutler – drums, percussion, noise
- Dagmar Krause – voice

Sound and art work

- Engineered and mixed by Etienne Conod
- Produced by Art Bears and Etienne Conod
- Cover art by "Art Bear IV"

== CD reissues ==
- Winter Songs and Art Bears' next album, The World as It Is Today were reissued on a single CD in 1988, entitled 25 Songs.
- The album was also reissued in 2004 in The Art Box, a 6xCD box set of all Art Bears releases with live and unreleased tracks, plus remixes by other musicians.
