= The World as It Is Today =

Studio album by Art Bears
- Released: 1981
- Recorded: August–September 1980
- Studios: Sunrise, Kirchberg, Switzerland
- Genres: Avant-rock, post-punk
- Length: 32:11
- Label: Recommended
- Producers: Art Bears, Etienne Conod

Art Bears chronology
Winter Songs (1979)	The World as It Is Today (1981)	The Art Box (2004)

Professional ratings
Review scores
Source	Rating
AllMusic	4.5/5 stars

The World as It Is Today is the third and last album by English avant-rock group Art Bears. It was recorded at Sunrise Studio in Kirchberg, Switzerland between 24 August and 7 September 1980, and was first released in 1981.

For technical reasons, the original release of this album on LP vinyl record was pressed on a 12" disc at 45-rpm, and not the usual 33⅓ rpm.

== Contents ==
The World as It Is Today comprises 11 songs, all composed by Fred Frith with texts by Chris Cutler. The last song, "Albion, Awake!" was recorded as an instrumental because Dagmar Krause objected strongly to the violent nature of the lyrics. The lyrics for "Albion, Awake!", however, still appear in the booklet accompanying the album. In 2013 the lyrics were set to music for Áine O'Dwyer's album Anything Bright or Startling?

== Track listing ==
All tracks are written by Fred Frith and Chris Cutler.

Side one
No.	Title	Length
1.	"The Song of Investment Capital Overseas"	2:38
2.	"Truth"	2:56
3.	"Freedom"	3:25
4.	"(Armed) Peace"	2:30
5.	"Civilisation"	4:52

Side two
No.	Title	Length
1.	"Democracy"	2:22
2.	"The Song of the Martyrs"	4:09
3.	"Law"	0:51
4.	"The Song of the Monopolists"	1:48
5.	"The Song of the Dignity of Labour Under Capital"	2:27
6.	"Albion, Awake!"	4:08

== Personnel ==
- Fred Frith – guitars, keyboards, viola, violin, xylophone
- Chris Cutler – drums, electric drums, noise
- Dagmar Krause – vocals

Sound and art work

- Produced by Art Bears and Etienne Conod
- Cover art by Art Bear IV

== CD reissues ==
- In 1988 The World as It Is Today and Art Bears' previous album Winter Songs were re-issued together on a single CD entitled 25 Songs.
- The album was also re-issued in 2004 as part of The Art Box a boxed set of six CDs, which included all the material released by the band, together with live and unreleased tracks, plus remixes by other musicians.
