= Chris Cutler =

English percussionist, composer, lyricist and music theorist (born 1947)

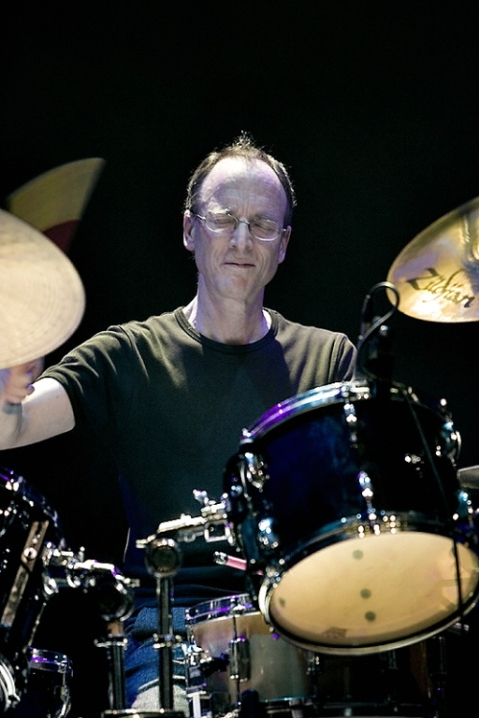
- Cutler with the Peter Blegvad Trio performing at a RIO Festival in Southern France, April 2007

Background information
- Born: Chris Cutler; 4 January 1947 (age 79); Washington, D.C., United States
- Genres: Avant-rock, experimental, free improvisation, contemporary classical
- Occupations: Musician, lyricist, Music theorist, Record company executive
- Instruments: Drums, percussion
- Years active: 1960s–present
- Label: Recommended
- Website: www.ccutler.co.uk

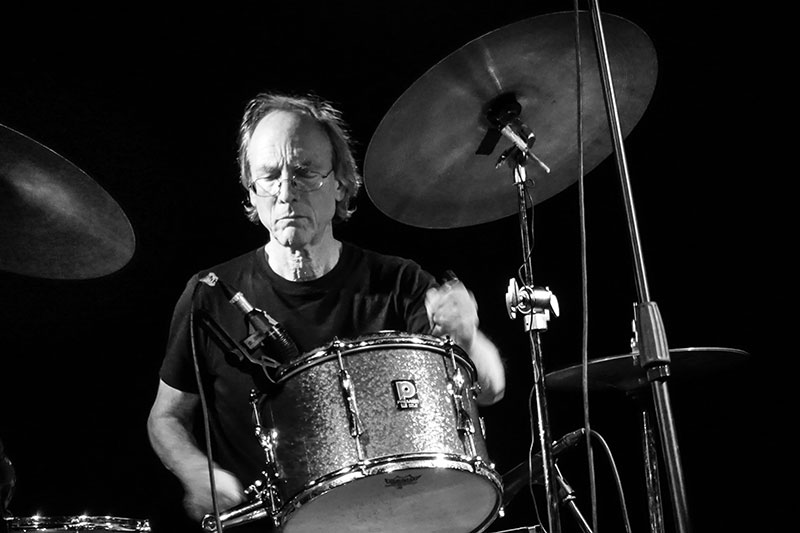
Cutler in Aarhus, Denmark, February 2017

Chris Cutler (born 4 January 1947) is an English percussionist, composer, lyricist and music theorist. Best known for his work with English avant-rock group Henry Cow, Cutler was also a member and drummer of other bands, including Art Bears, News from Babel, Pere Ubu and (briefly) Gong/Mothergong. He has collaborated with many musicians and groups, including Fred Frith, Lindsay Cooper, Zeena Parkins, Peter Blegvad, Telectu, and The Residents, and has appeared on over 100 recordings. Cutler's career spans over four decades and he still performs actively throughout the world.

Cutler created and runs the British independent record label Recommended Records and is the editor of its sound-magazine, RēR Quarterly. He has given a number of public lectures on music, published numerous articles and papers, and written a book on the political theory of contemporary music, File Under Popular (1984). Cutler also assembled and released The 40th Anniversary Henry Cow Box Set (2009), a collection of over 10 hours of previously unreleased recordings by the band.

== Biography ==
Chris Cutler was born on 4 January 1947 in Washington, D.C., United States to a British intelligence officer and his Austrian wife. In 1948 the family moved to England, where Cutler was brought up. He never studied music but tried his hand at banjo, guitar, trumpet and flute while at school. He finally settled for drums "because I wanted to be in a band and drummers were scarcest." Cutler formed his first band in 1963, playing Shadows and Ventures instrumental covers, then played in several R&B and soul bands. In 1966 he joined a band called Louise, with Tony Durant (later of Fuchsia), which performed on the London psychedelic club circuit for three years before breaking up. Looking for work, Cutler placed a series of advertisements in Melody Maker over a period of nine months in 1970. This put him in touch with a number of musicians which led to Cutler and keyboardist Dave Stewart of Egg forming The Ottawa Music Company, a 26 piece rock composer's orchestra, in 1971. Soon afterwards, Henry Cow, looking to replace the drummer who had just left them, responded to one of Cutler's adverts and invited him to a rehearsal.

=== Henry Cow ===
Henry Cow had been formed in 1968 by Cambridge University students Fred Frith (guitar) and Tim Hodgkinson (woodwind and keyboards). By 1971 the band had gone through a number of personnel changes and it was only when Cutler joined them in September 1971 that the group stabilised. Frith, Hodgkinson and Cutler became Henry Cow's permanent core until the band split up in 1978.

Henry Cow's prominence in progressive rock circles launched the careers of many of its members, including Cutler's. Their music was uncompromising and this eventually put them at odds with the mainstream music business, forcing the band to do everything themselves: from recording, manufacturing and releasing their own albums, to organising their own tours and being their own management and agency. All this proved invaluable experience for Cutler that would assist him greatly in his future endeavours. The group spent most of its last three years touring Europe and many of Cutler's future collaborations resulted from contact made with musicians on these tours. In Henry Cow's last few months they initiated Rock in Opposition (RIO), a collective of like-minded bands they had encountered through Europe that were united in their opposition to the music industry. (Note: See Rock in Opposition.)

=== Recommended Records ===
After Henry Cow disbanded in 1978, Cutler created Recommended Records in London, an independent label and distribution network for RIO artists. The record label quickly filled the gap left by commercial labels and soon began to also release non-RIO bands and musicians. Recommended Records's aim was to produce records of high technical and musical quality, placing the musicians' interests first and profits second. This strategy, however, led to the label experiencing financial difficulties from time to time, but it stuck to its principles and has survived for over 25 years. There are a number of musicians whose work would never have seen the light of day had it not been for Cutler's label.

Cutler also founded November Books in 1982, the publishing wing of Recommended Records.

=== Other bands and projects ===
Cutler's first post-Henry Cow project was Art Bears (1978–1981), a group formed by Cutler, and fellow Henry Cow members, Fred Frith (guitar and keyboards) and Dagmar Krause (vocals), six months before Henry Cow split up. Art Bears were a song-oriented group that recorded three studio albums. Cutler's main contributions were the songs' texts and (with Frith) the album productions. Art Bears (in the wake of Henry Cow) were well received by critics which further boosted Cutler's reputation in "progressive" circles.

In 1982, Cutler co-founded the Anglo-German group Cassiber (1982–1992) with German musicians Heiner Goebbels, Alfred Harth and Christoph Anders. Over the next ten years Cassiber produced five albums and toured Europe, Asia, South and North America. Their music was very experimental and often involved spontaneously improvising pre-existing structured and arranged material.

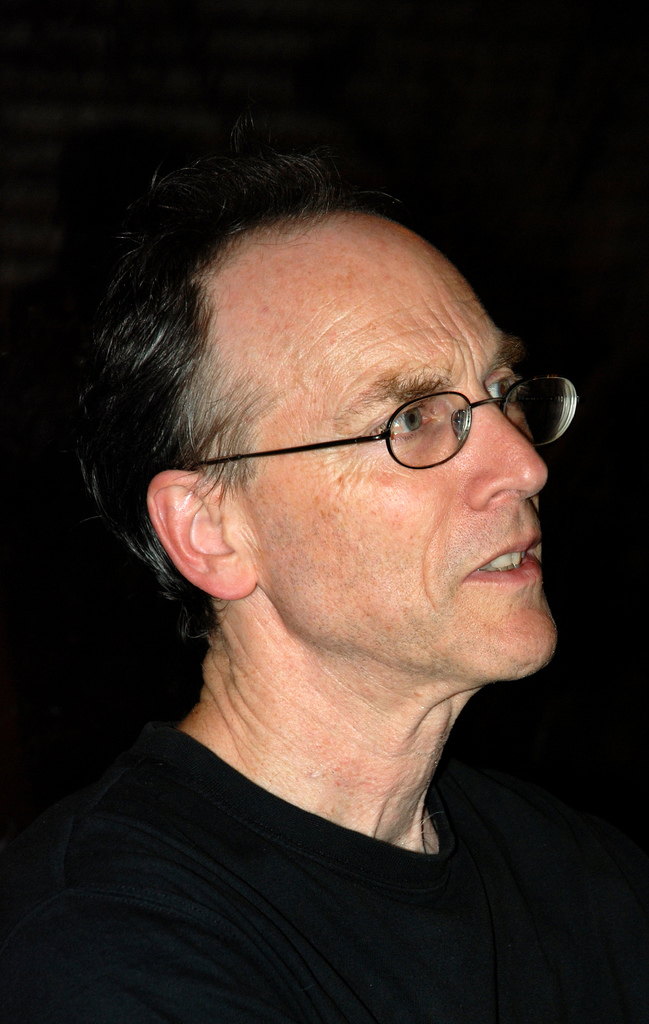
Chris Cutler at the Hyperion Ensemble Spectrum XXI festival in Paris, 3 November 2007.

In 1983, Cutler formed News from Babel (1983–1986), another song-orientated group with core members Cutler, Lindsay Cooper (from Henry Cow), Zeena Parkins (a United States harpist) and Dagmar Krause. With guest musicians (including Robert Wyatt and Sally Potter) they made two critically acclaimed studio albums, but did not perform live.

Cutler was a member of the United States experimental rock band Pere Ubu between 1987 and 1989. He had first encountered them in Washington DC in 1978 while exploring the possibility of Henry Cow touring America (which never materialised as Henry Cow disbanded soon after). Cutler kept in touch with Pere Ubu until they split in the early 1980s and their singer, David Thomas began a solo career. Cutler and Lindsay Cooper joined Thomas in 1982 to form David Thomas and the Pedestrians, and for the next three years they toured Europe and North America and made two albums. Over the next few years, some of the ex-Pere Ubu members began joining Thomas's Pedestrians. Cooper left in 1985 and by 1987 the group (now called David Thomas and the Wooden Birds) was effectively Pere Ubu again. As Pere Ubu, the band (with Cutler) made two albums. Cutler left in 1989, but was credited as a co-writer on the band's 1991 album World in Collision for several songs written during his tenure.

In 1991, Cutler and German composer Lutz Glandien recorded the critically acclaimed song project Domestic Stories. Cutler wrote the song texts and played drums, while Glandien composed and performed the music with samplers and computers. The supporting musicians were Dagmar Krause (vocals), Fred Frith (bass and guitar) and Alfred Harth (saxophone and clarinet). Cutler collaborated with Glandien again in 1994 to record Scenes from no Marriage and to participate in p53, a commission for the 25th Frankfurt Jazz Festival with Zygmunt Krauze, Marie Goyette, Otomo Yoshihide.

The (ec) Nudes were a band Cutler, Wädi Gysi (guitar) and Amy Denio (vocals, bass, saxophone, accordion) formed in 1993. The trio recorded Vanishing Point, a CD of songs with texts by Cutler and music by Gysi and Denio, and toured all over Europe and visited Brasil. Bob Drake later joined the group on bass and as a quartet they toured all over Europe, Canada and Brazil, but did not record. Cutler left the group in 1994.

Cutler and Yugoslav keyboardist and composer Stevan Tickmayer formed The Science Group in 1997 to record A Mere Coincidence (1999), an album of songs on science topics, including quantum mechanics. Cutler wrote the texts, Tickmayer composed the music, and the rest of the group comprised Bob Drake (bass guitar, vocals) and Claudio Puntin (bass clarinet), with guests Amy Denio (vocals) and Fred Frith (guitar). In 2003 Cutler and Tickmayer reconstituted The Science Group as a quartet with Bob Drake (bass guitar) and Mike Johnson (guitars), and released an instrumental album, Spoors. In 1998, he joined John Wolf Brennan's sextet "HeXtet" to record a series of poetry settings, from Edgar Allan Poe to contemporary Irish poets like Theo Dorgan and Paula Meehan, together with legendary singer Julie Tippetts, saxophonist Evan Parker, trombonist Paul Rutherford, and clarinetist Peter Whyman.

=== Other collaborations ===
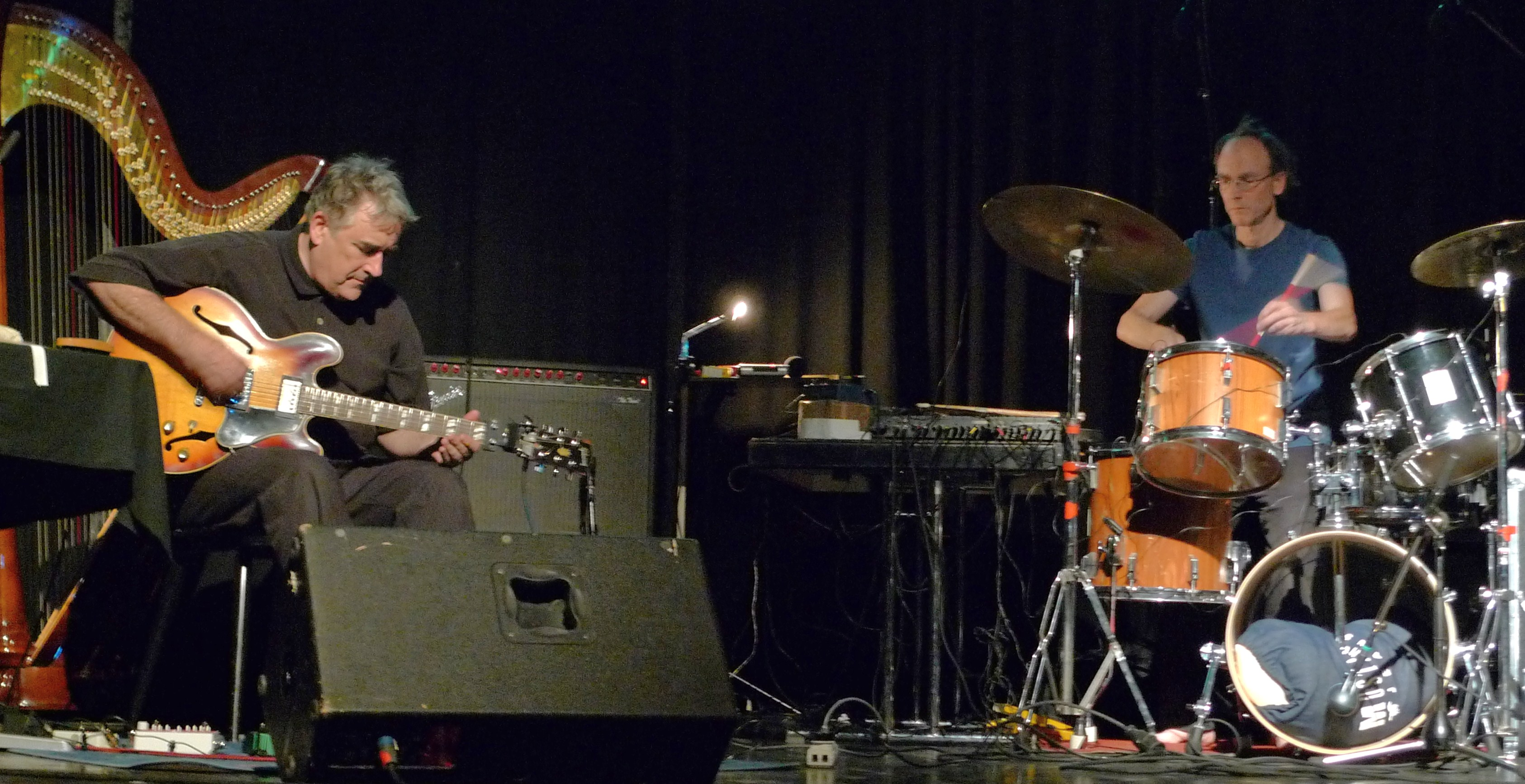
Fred Frith (left) and Cutler performing in Austria, November 2009.

The ex-Henry Cow members have always maintained close contact with each other and Cutler still collaborates with many of them. Cutler and Fred Frith have been touring Europe, Asia and the Americas since 1978 and have given over 100 duo performances. Four albums from some of these concerts have been released. In December 2006, Cutler, Frith and Tim Hodgkinson performed together at The Stone in New York City, only their second concert performance since Henry Cow's demise in 1978. Cutler, John Greaves, and Geoff Leigh formed The Artaud Beats with Yumi Hara. Cutler and Hara also work together in Half the Sky, a band formed in 2015 to play the music of former Henry Cow member Lindsay Cooper, principally pieces she wrote for News from Babel and Henry Cow. The band have performed in Japan, France, the UK and Germany.

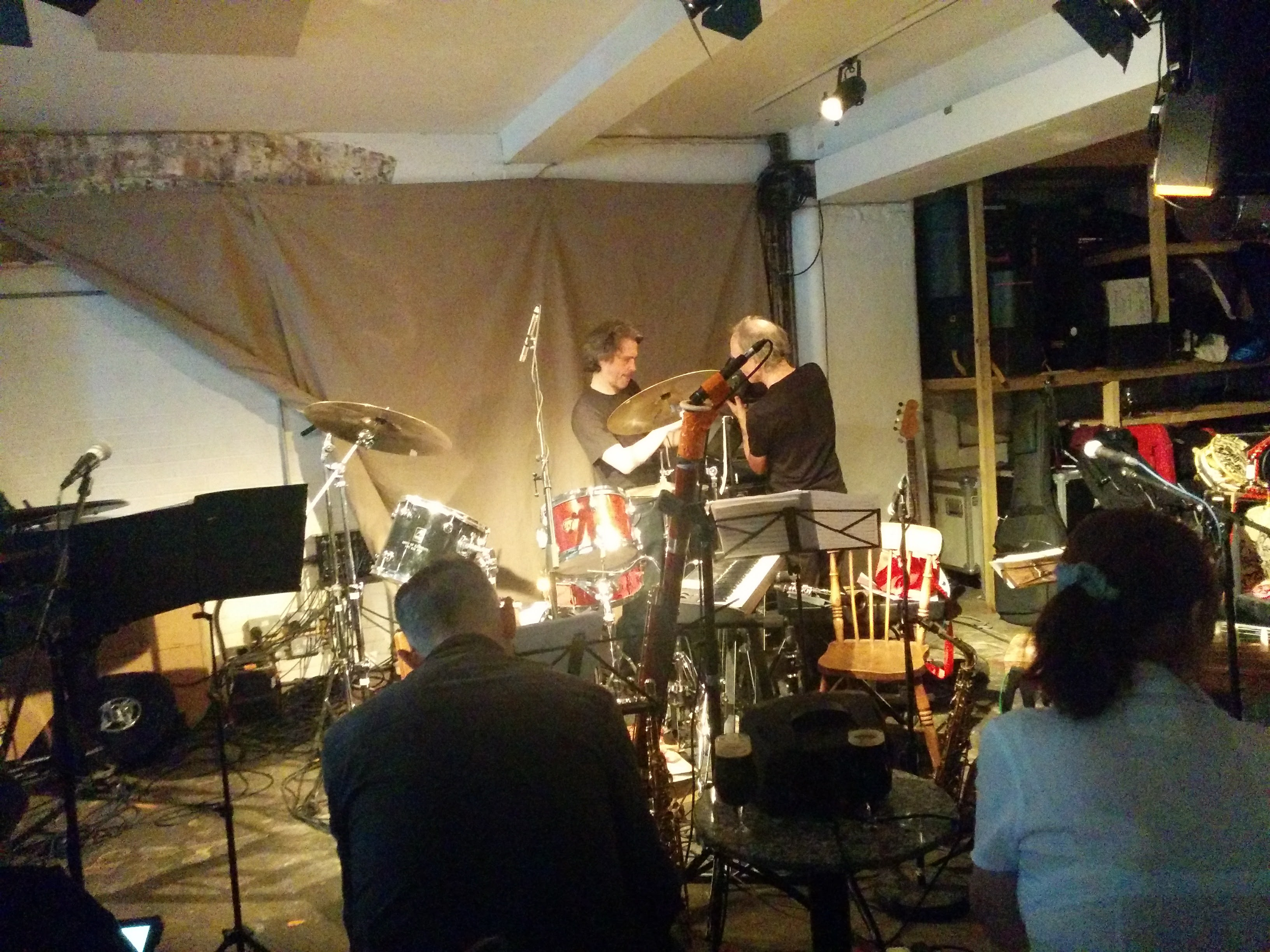
Cutler setting up before a live performance by the band Half the Sky, in London, June 2017

On 4 November 2006 Cutler, Jon Rose (violin) and Zeena Parkins (harp) performed with the BBC Scottish Symphony Orchestra conducted by Ilan Volkov, at the Glasgow City Halls in Glasgow, Scotland. The concert was recorded and later broadcast by BBC Radio 3 on 24 March 2007.

Other musicians and bands Cutler has performed and recorded with over the years include Tim Hodgkinson, Lindsay Cooper, Peter Blegvad, John Greaves, René Lussier, Jean Derome, Tom Cora, Aksak Maboul, The Residents, The Work, Duck and Cover, Les 4 Guitaristes de l'Apocalypso-Bar, Kalahari Surfers, Hail, Biota, and Brainville 3.

In 2009, Cutler toured North America with avant-garde Czech violinist Iva Bittová. In 2015 he collaborated with Alfred Harth founding a group Hope, a commission for the 46th Frankfurt Jazz Festival with Kazuhisa Uchihashi, Mitsuru Nasuno.

=== Solo performances ===
Since the late 1990s, Cutler began giving solo electrified percussion performances to audiences across the world. His first was in Tokyo in June 1998, which was recorded in a documentary film, At the Edge of Chaos (also known as 12 June 1998), by award-winning film director Shinji Aoyama. The first part of the film is equipment set-up and sound-checks, plus interviews with Cutler, while the second part is the improvised concert itself.

In 2001 Cutler released Solo: A Descent Into the Maelstrom, an album of solos on his electrified drum kit taken from live performances in Europe and the United States between August 2000 and May 2001. In 2005 he released Twice Around the World, an album of real-time recordings made from all over the world between 23.30 and midnight GMT. The material was taken from a daily half-hour radio programme Cutler ran for Resonance FM: Out of the Blue Radio between July 2001 and July 2002. A companion album, There and Back Again, comprising 44 environmental recordings, was released by Cutler in 2006.

== Electrified drum kit ==
Cutler never studied music and taught himself drumming on makeshift drum kits assembled with whatever was on hand. He slowly developed a technique using a "top-down" approach as opposed to the traditional "bottom-up" approach used by schooled drummers. Drummers are first taught basic patterns which are later combined into more complex patterns. Cutler learned the opposite way, hearing or imagining a sound and then disciplining his hands and feet to reproduce it. This "top-down" approach resulted in a unique style of drumming that pervades all of Cutler's performances and recordings.

By the time Cutler was drumming for Henry Cow in 1971, he had become a perfectly competent, albeit unconventional, drummer. The nature of Henry Cow was to experiment and explore and it was here that Cutler developed and refined his drumming techniques. It was also here that he started to electrify his drum kit. He began by attaching old telephone mouthpieces to drums and cymbals, and connecting them to an amplifier and a reverb unit. He later added a small mixer for four independent inputs. The effect was very basic: a few low-grade inputs with only equalisation and reverberation to manipulate.

By 1982, Cutler had added another small mixer, a pitch shifter and a delay unit. He had also begun using cheap guitar transducers and a table full of additional wired objects (pans, metal trays, small tambours and egg-slicers).

Cutler experimented briefly with drum pads triggered to play sampled or synthesized sounds, but quickly dismissed this option because he found them unresponsive and inflexible. They reduced a drum to nothing more than a switch: hit it and a pre-programmed sound is emitted, irrespective of how hard or in what manner the drum is struck. Cutler preferred real-time processing: amplifying and modifying actual sounds produced by the drum, making it a kind of an electroacoustic instrument, immediate and responsive, and retaining all the qualities of an acoustic drum kit.

Cutler went on to wire his entire drum kit, using a 16 channel mixer with multi-effect processors, a "Space pedal", a "Whammy pedal", a PDS 8000 and an old Boss pitch shifter/delay unit. In addition to transducers, he also attached miniature microphones to some of the drums and sticks. Cutler introduced feedback into the mix by placing a monitor speaker near the kit.

The electrified drum kit continues to evolve and to Cutler it is "satisfyingly unpredictable", prompting him to give solo performances because it tested his skill at playing an instrument had to change with.

== Writings and talks ==
=== Talks ===
In the early 1980s, Chris Cutler became active in the International Association for the Study of Popular Music (IASPM) and started giving talks and participating in symposia throughout the world. Some of the talks he has given are:

- "Composing with Other People's Music – Creativity or Theft?", British Council, Belgrade.
- "Electrification and Experimentation, the Development of New Musical Resources in the Popular Field", Union of Composers, Moscow.
- "Improvisation: Motives and Methods", IASPM, University of Leeds.
- "Rock in Opposition, a case study". Academy of Science, Berlin.
- "Studio Composition and Visualisation" – a case study IASPM, University, Montreal
- "Sonic and Structural Convergence at the fringes of Musical Genres". The Royal College of Art, London.
- "On The Impact of Recording Technology on Popular music." Pomeriggi Musicali do Milano.
- "Plunderphonics and Postmodernism", Dissonanten, Rotterdam.
- "Sampling and Plunderphonics", Museum School, Boston.
- "The Recording Studio as a Compositional Instrument", The Royal College of Art, London.

=== Essays ===
Cutler has written and published a number of essays on music, including:

- "Necessity and Choice in Musical Forms: Concerning Musical and Technical Means and Political Needs" (1990) – an essay on the evolution of recorded music, published in The Cassette Mythos.
- "Plunderphonia" (1994) – an essay on plunderphonics, published in Musicworks 60.
- "Scale" (1997) – an essay on the scale of sounds in music, published in The Gramophone Special Edition "Perspectives on Contemporary Music".
- "Thoughts on Music and the Avant Garde" (2005) – an essay commissioned for a book dedicated to Professor Gunther Mayer, published in Perfect Sound Forever.
- "Locality" (2006) – published in Resonance Magazine.
- "The Road to Plunderphonia" (2011) – published by Quaderns d'àudio/Ràdio Web MACBA.

=== Radio broadcasts ===
From 2012, Cutler has been producing a series of podcasts/lectures entitled "Probes" that examine the history of music from the invention of sound recording to the present day. The series was commissioned by the Museum of Modern Art, Barcelona, and published and broadcast by "Quaderns d'àudio"/Ràdio Web MACBA.

=== Books ===
Cutler has also published three books:

- The Henry Cow Book (co-authored with Tim Hodgkinson) (1981) – a collection of documents and information about the band.
- File Under Popular (1984) – a collection of theoretical and critical writings on music, also published in Polish, German and Japanese.
- Not as We Choose (2020) – a further collection of theoretical and critical writings on music, illustrated by Peter Blegvad.

== Discography ==
Here is a selection of albums Chris Cutler has performed on, showing the year they were first released:

=== Bands and projects ===
With Henry Cow

- Legend (1973, LP, Virgin Records, UK)
- Unrest (1974, LP, Virgin, UK)
- Concerts (1976, 2xLP, Caroline Records, UK)
- Western Culture (1979, LP, Broadcast, UK)
- The Virgin Years – Souvenir Box (1991, 3xCD, East Side Digital Records, US)
- Henry Cow Box (2006, 7xCD, Recommended Records, UK)
- Stockholm & Göteborg (2008, CD, Recommended Records, UK)
- The 40th Anniversary Henry Cow Box Set (2009, 9xCD+DVD, Recommended Records, UK)
- The Henry Cow Box Redux: The Complete Henry Cow (2019, 17xCD+DVD, Recommended Records, UK)

With Henry Cow/Slapp Happy

- Desperate Straights (1975, LP, Virgin Records, UK)
- In Praise of Learning (1975, LP, Virgin Records, UK)

With Art Bears

- Hopes and Fears (1978, LP, Recommended Records, UK)
- Winter Songs (1979, LP, Recommended Records, UK)
- The World as It Is Today (1981, LP, Recommended Records, UK)
- The Art Box (2004, 6xCD, Recommended Records, UK)

With The Residents

- Eskimo (1979, LP, Ralph Records, USA)
- Commercial Album (1980, LP, Ralph Records, USA)

With Aksak Maboul

- Un Peu de l'Âme des Bandits (1980, LP, Crammed Discs, Belgium)

With Cassiber

- Man or Monkey? (1982, 2xLP, Riskant, Germany)
- Beauty and the Beast (1984, LP, Recommended Records, UK)
- Perfect Worlds (1986, LP, Recommended Records, UK)
- A Face We All Know (1990, CD, Recommended Records, UK)
- Live in Tokyo (1998, 2xCD, Recommended Records, UK)

With The Work

- Live in Japan (1982, LP, Recommended Records, Japan)

With Fred Frith

- Live in Prague and Washington, (1983, LP, Recommended Records, UK) – 1990 CD release retitled Live in Moscow, Prague & Washington
- Live in Trondheim, Berlin & Limoges, Vol. 2 (1994, CD, Recommended Records, UK)
- 2 Gentlemen in Verona (2000, CD, Recommended Records, UK)
- The Stone: Issue Two (2007, CD, Tzadik Records, US)

With Lindsay Cooper, Bill Gilonis, Tim Hodgkinson and Robert Wyatt

- The Last Nightingale (1984, LP, Recommended Records, UK)

With News from Babel

- Work Resumed on the Tower (1984, LP, Recommended Records, UK)
- Letters Home (1986, LP, Recommended Records, UK)

With David Thomas and the Pedestrians

- Winter Comes Home (1983, LP, Recommended Records, UK)
- Variations on a Theme (1983, LP, Rough Trade Records, UK)
- More Places Forever (1985, LP, Rough Trade Records, UK)

With Duck and Cover

- Re Records Quarterly Vol.1 No.2 (1985, LP, Recommended Records UK)

Les 4 Guitaristes de l'Apocalypso-Bar

- Tournée Mondiale/Été '89 (1987, LP, Ambiances Magnétiques, Canada)
- Fin de Siècle (1989, LP, Ambiances Magnétiques, Canada)

With Peter Blegvad

- Downtime (1988, LP, Recommended Records, UK)
- Just Woke Up (1995, LP, Recommended Records, UK)
- Hangman's Hill (1998, LP, Recommended Records, UK)
- Go Figure (2017, CD, Recommended Records, UK)

With Pere Ubu

- The Tenement Year (1988, LP, Fontana Records)
- Cloudland (1989, LP, Fontana Records)
- Worlds in Collision (1991, Fontanta; does not perform but credited as co-writer on three songs)

With Hail

- Kirk (1992, CD, Recommended Records, UK)

With Lutz Glandien

- Domestic Stories (1993, CD, Recommended Records, UK)
- Scenes From No Marriage (1994, CD, Recommended Records, UK)

With The (ec) Nudes

- Vanishing Point (1994, LP, Recommended Records, UK)

With p53

- p53 (1996, CD, Recommended Records, UK)

With Biota

- Object Holder (1995, CD, Recommended Records, UK)

With Zeena Parkins

- Shark! (1996, CD, Recommended Records, UK)

With René Lussier and Jean Derome

- Three Suite Piece (1996, CD, Recommended Records, UK)

With John Wolf Brennan

- HeXtet: Through the Ear of a Raindrop (1998, CD, Leo Records, UK)

With Thomas Dimuzio

- Quake (1999, CD, Recommended Records, UK)

With The Science Group

- A Mere Coincidence (1999, CD, Recommended Records, UK)
- Spoors (2003, CD, Recommended Records, UK)

With Roberto Musci, Jon Rose and Claudio Gabbiani

- Steel Water Light (2001, CD, Recommended Records, UK)

With Vril

- Effigies in Cork (2003, CD, Recommended Records, UK)
- The Fatal Duckpond (2009, CD, Recommended Records, UK)

With The Orckestra

- "Unreleased Orckestra Extract" (3" CD single, 2006, Recommended Records, UK)

With Brainville 3

- Trial by Headline (2008, CD, Recommended Records, UK)

With Thomas Dimuzio and Fred Frith

- Golden State (2010, LP, Recommended Records, UK) (Note: Golden State is an LP-only release; "a CD just wouldn't be the same, sonically, visually or ontologically." – Chris Cutler.)

With Fred Frith and Tom Cora

- Live in Tel Aviv and Aubervilliers (2021, CD, Fred Records, UK) (Note: A limited edition bonus CD included in the Fred Records Story box set.)

With Yumi Hara

- Groove Study (2023, CD, UK)

=== Solo ===
- Solo: A Descent Into the Maelstrom (2001, CD, Recommended Records)
- Twice Around the Earth (2005, CD, Recommended Records)
- There and Back Again (2006, CD, Recommended Records)
- Compositions and Collaborations 1972-2022 (2023, box set, Recommended Records)

== Bibliography ==
- Cutler, Chris; Hodgkinson, Tim (1981). The Henry Cow Book. Third Step Printworks. ISBN 0-9508870-0-5.
- Cutler, Chris (1984). File Under Popular: Theoretical and Critical Writings on Music. November Books. ISBN 0-946423-01-6.
- Cutler, Chris, ed. (2009). The Road: Volumes 1–5 (book from The 40th Anniversary Henry Cow Box Set). Recommended Records.
- Cutler, Chris, ed. (2009). The Road: Volumes 6–10 (book from The 40th Anniversary Henry Cow Box Set). Recommended Records.
- Cutler, Chris (2011). The Road to Plunderphonia. Quaderns d'àudio/Ràdio Web MACBA. ISSN 2013-4681.
- Cutler, Chris (2020). Not as We Choose: Music, Memory and Technology.

== Films ==
- At the Edge of Chaos (2001, DVD) – 65 minute documentary (also known as 12 June 1998) by Shinji Aoyama on a Chris Cutler solo percussion concert in Tokyo, June 1998.
- Roulette TV Volume 8 (2003, DVD, Roulette) – live TV recording back-to-back with Shelley Hirsch, March 2001.

== See also ==
- Romantic Warriors II: A Progressive Music Saga About Rock in Opposition
- Romantic Warriors II: Special Features DVD

== Works cited ==
- Jones, Andrew (1995). "Chris Cutler". In Jones, Andrew (ed.). Plunderphonics, 'pataphysics & pop mechanics: an introduction to musique actuelle. SAF Publishing Ltd. pp. 14–27. ISBN 0-946719-15-2.
- Piekut, Benjamin (2019). Henry Cow: The World Is a Problem. Duke University Press. ISBN 978-1-47800-405-9.
