= Zygmunt Krauze =

Polish composer, educator, and pianist

Zygmunt Krauze (born September 19, 1938) is a Polish composer of contemporary classical music, educator, and pianist.

== Biography ==
Zygmunt Krauze is an important artist of his generation: a respected composer, valued pianist, educator, organiser of musical events and a judge in many international competitions. His artistic achievements and efforts in the promotion of music have been recognised with many awards and distinctions, including the French National Order of the Legion of Honour (2007) and the Chevalier dans l’Ordre des Arts et des Lettres (1984). In 1987 he was appointed President of the International Society for Contemporary Music and has been an honorary member of the organization since 1999. In 2011, Krauze became an honorary member of the Polish Composers' Union and a year later he was awarded the title of Coryphaeus of Polish Music in the category of Personality of the Year.

=== Composer ===
Krauze’s compositions include ten operas: "The Star" (1981), "Balthazar" (2001), "Yvonne, Princess of Burgundy" (2004), "Polyeucte" (2010), "The Trap" (2011) and "Olympia of Gdansk" (2015), "Yemaya - Queen of the Seas" (2019), "Night of the Ravens" (2022), "The Marriage" (2024) and "Bona Sforza" (2024). They were staged in such theatres as the National Theater in Mannheim, Theatre National de la Colline in Paris, Staatsoper Theater in Hamburg, Teatr Wielki National Opera in Warsaw, Opera Wrocławska, Warszawska Opera Kameralna, Opera Krakowska and Théâtre du Capitole in Toulouse. In 2012 a staging of the opera „Polyeucte” received the award of the French Syndicat de la critique Théâtre, Musique et Danse as the best musical creation of the year. The instrumental forms employed by Krauze vary from miniatures to symphonic works engaging hundreds of musicians.

In his compositions, piano is the instrument given the highest priority. As an actively performing pianist, Krauze not only composes for this instrument, but also performs his own compositions. This applies both to his early work, such as "Six Folk Melodies" (1958), through compositions resulting from experimentation with musical notation ("Five Unitary Piano Pieces" 1963, "Triptych" 1964), later experiments with the sound of the piano ("Stone Music" 1972, "Arabesque" 1983, "Adieu" 2001), theatrical games ("Gloves Music" 1972, "One Piano Eight Hands" 1973) and piano concertos (1976, 1996) where virtuosity is combined with a strong emotional charge. Other important instrumental works include: "Tableau Vivant" (1982) for chamber orchestra, "Blanc-rouge / Paysage d'un Pays" (1985) for a wind orchestra, a mandolin orchestra, an accordion orchestra and 6 percussions, "Quatuor Pour La Naissance" (1985), "Piano Quintet" (1993), "Canzona" for a chamber orchestra (2011) and "Memories of the East" (2012) for 85 Chinese instruments.

Unitary music is exceptionally important in the list of Krauze’s work. As he says: „The sound is individual enough to make it possible to distinguish it from the chaos of other music and other sounds. The performed composition has the ability to put time in order. (...) The beginning of each composition immediately exposes the entire range of sounds and during the piece nothing new is introduced. There will be no surprises. (...) This music creates the space for a different way of being perceived. A perfect situation would occur if the music were continually present, the listener came at the time that he or she felt convenient and left when the right moment right to do so was found.” The theoretical base of unitary art comes from the paintings of Władysław Strzemiński. Examples of Krauze’s unitary music are "Polychromy" (1968), "Pieces for Orchestra No. 1" (1969), "String Quartet No. 2" (1970) and "String Quartet No. 3" (1982).

Music for theatre is also present among Krauze’s compositions. He has been collaborating with Jorge Lavelli, an Argentinian director living in France, for over three decades. From this collaboration grew musical illustrations to plays staged in the Comédie-Française and in the Theatre National de la Colline in Paris, including "Polyeucte" by Pierre Corneille (1987), "Opérette" by Witold Gombrowicz (1988), "Macbeth" by Eugene Ionesco (1992), "Merlin" by Tankred Dorst (2005), "Oedipus Rex" by Sophocles (2008) and "El Avaro" by Moliere.

The last, however, not least important, group of works are choral pieces and songs. The most notable among them are compositions from recent years: "Ball In The Opera" (2006) for chamber choir and 12 instruments based on Julian Tuwim's text, and "Voyage de Chopin" (2010) for a chamber choir a capella, or with an ensemble of folk instruments, based on Chopin's letters. Five Songs for Baritone and Piano (2010) is influenced by the poetry of Tadeusz Różewicz (2010) and "La Terre" (1995) for soprano, piano and orchestra, illustrates Yves Bonnefoy’s poems.

Krauze is often invited to cooperate with foreign cultural institutions. Nearly all of his compositions are commissioned. His most important partners are: the Ministries of Culture of Poland and France, Austrian Radio, Westdeutscher Rundfunk in Cologne, Südwestrundfunk Radio in Baden-Baden, the Gulbenkian Foundation in Lisbon, Suntory Limited in Tokyo, the National Theater in Mannheim, Radio France and Polskie Radio. Zygmunt Krauze's compositions have been performed at numerous music festivals both in Poland and abroad, as well as in renowned concert halls, such as Wiener Konzerthaus, Concertgebouw in Amsterdam, Bellas Artes in Mexico City, Palais de Festival in Cannes and Beethovenshalle in Bonn. Many of his compositions have been recorded and released on records of Polskie Nagrania, DUX, ORF, Nonesuch, Thesis, Musical Observations (CP2), Collins Classics, Warner Classics, Recommended Records and EMI.

=== Educator ===
Krauze’s composition studies were completed under the supervision of Kazimierz Sikorski and his piano studies were supervised by Maria Wiłkomirska at the PWSM (Higher State School of Music) in Warsaw. He obtained a French governmental scholarship and worked under the supervision of Nadia Boulanger. Soon after, he began sharing his knowledge with young students of composition and has done so until today. Since 1965 he has been conducting seminars and composition courses in Darmstadt, Basel, Paris, Tokyo, Stockholm, Jerusalem, Beijing, Hong Kong and at universities in the USA: Indiana University Bloomington and the University of California, Santa Barbara. During 1973-1974 he worked in Berlin as an artist-in-residence invited by the Deutscher Akademischer Austauschdienst. In 1981, he was a visiting professor at Yale University in New Haven and in 1996 he received the title of Eminent Corresponding Professor in Keimyung University in Daegu, South Korea. In 2002, he was appointed as a Professor of Composition at the Academy of Music in Łódź and from 2006 he has been lecturing at the Fryderyk Chopin University of Music in Warsaw. Krauze was awarded the degree of Doctor honoris causa of National Music University in Bucharest (2013) and the Academy of Music in Łódź (2015).

=== Performer ===
In 1966 Zygmunt Krauze received First Prize at the Gaudeamus International Interpreters Competition (in the Netherlands) for performers of contemporary music. Since then he has performed at many of the most important stages of the world. He has been working with such conductors as Gary Bertini, Jan Krenz, Leif Segerstam, Kazimierz Kord, Kazuyoshi Akiyama, Ernest Bour, Hans Zender, Péter Eötvös, Antoni Wit and Luca Pfaff. In 1967, he founded his ensemble Warsztat Muzyczny (Music Workshop), which he directed for 25 years. The ensemble commissioned over 100 compositions that were created by renowned composers from around the world, including: Louis Andriessen, Morton Feldman, Michael Nyman, Per Nørgård, Mauricio Kagel, Henryk Górecki, Wojciech Kilar, Kazimierz Serocki and Witold Szalonek. Krauze was one of the first composers in Poland to employ new performance forms, for example, musical space compositions (installations). He collaborated with architects: Teresa Kelm in the Contemporary Gallery in Warsaw (1968, 1970), with Wiesław Nowak and Jan Muniak in Metz (1987) and in the Museum of Contemporary Art in Łódź, as well as in the natural setting of the Eggenberg Castle in Graz (1974) and the Rohan Palace in Strasburg.

=== Organizer ===
Krauze's activity as an organiser of musical events began in 1970 when he became a member of the Repertoire Committee of the Warsaw Autumn Festival. He held this position for 11 years. In 1980, his efforts led to the revival of the Polish Society for Contemporary Music and he was its president for the next two decades. At the invitation of Pierre Boulez in 1982, he became an artistic advisor at the Institut de Recherche de Coordination Acoustique/Musique (IRCAM). In 1983-84 he hosted weekly music programs at Radio France Musique. The Polish musical community honoured Krauze with an award of the Polish Composers' Union (1998), twice he received the award of the Ministry of Culture (1989, 2005) and a "Gloria Artis" golden medal. He was one of the founding members of the Witold Lutosławski Society and for one term held the position of its president. For 13 years he has been the artistic director of the Music Gardens Foundation, which every year organises a monthlong Music Gardens Summer Festival at the Royal Castle in Warsaw. He is regularly invited to be a judge in international composition competitions throughout the world.

== Works ==
=== Symphonic ===
- Children's Requiem (2025) for soprano, baritone, children's choir, mixed choir and orchestra
- De arte, de homine (2025)
- Piano Concerto No. 4 (2023)
- Exordium (2020)
- Piano Concerto No. 3 (2019)
- Concerto for Accordion and Orchestra (2016)
- Rivière Souterraine No. 2 (2013) for electronic sound and symphonic orchestra
- The Letters (2010) for four pianos and orchestra / for two pianos, four pianists and orchestra
- Hymn for Tolerance (2007) for orchestra
- Adieu (2001) for upright piano and orchestra
- Emille Bell (2000) for String Orchestra
- Serenade (1998) for orchestra
- Piano Concerto No. 2 (1996) for piano and orchestra
- Rhapsod (1995) for string orchestra
- Terra incognita (1994) for 10 strings and piano
- Marcia (1991) for orchestra
- Symphonie parisienne (1986) for orchestra
- Blanc-rouge / Paysage d'un pays (1985) for two orchestral masses: wind orchestras, mandolin orchestra, accordion orchestra and 6 percussions (300 musicians)
- Arabesque (1983) for piano (with amplification) and chamber orchestra
- Piece for Orchestra No. 3 (1982)
- Tableau vivant (1982) for chamber orchestra
- Violin Concerto (1980) for violin and orchestra
- Suite de dances et de chansons (1977) for harpsichord and orchestra
- Piano Concerto No. 1 (1976) for piano and orchestra
- Fete galante et pastorale (1975 concert version of spatial work) for 4 soloists playing on folk instruments (4 hurdy-gurdies, 4 bagpipes, 4 folk violins, 4 fifes) and orchestra
- Aus aller Welt Stammende (1973) for 10 strings (5 violins, 3 violas, 2 cellos)
- Folk Music (1972) for Orchestra
- Voices (1972) for 15 optional instruments
- Piece for Orchestra No. 2 (1970)
- Piece for Orchestra No. 1 (1969)

=== Chamber ===
- String Trio (2024)
- 11 Preludes (2012) Chopin's Preludes arranged for chamber ensemble with 9 interludes
- Fields and Hills - silence (2009)
- Pour El (2008) for harpsichord
- Voices for Ljubljana (2007) for seven instruments: viola, cello, flute, clarinet, trombone, piano and percussion
- Fanfare (2007) for four trumpets
- Ode (2004) for flute, ocarina, 2 trumpets in C, guitar and 3 tom-toms
- Divertissement Silesienne (1998) for string quartet
- Pastorale (1995) for flute, oboe, clarinet, French horn, bassoon
- P - 53 (1994) for any player(s)
- Piano Quintet (1993) for string quartet and piano
- For Alfred Schlee with admiration (1991) for string quartet
- The Underground River (1987) Concert version for 7 players (clarinet, trombone, percussion, guitar, piano, accordion, cello) and 7 tapes
- Je prefere qu'il chante (1985) For bassoon
- Quatuor pour la naissance (1984) For clarinet, violin, cello and piano
- String Quartet No. 3 (1982)
- Commencement (1982) For harpsichord solo
- Dyptychos (1981) For organ
- Automatophone (1976) Concert version for 3 or more mandolins, 3 or more guitars, 3 or more music boxes
- Soundscape (1975) For 4 soloists playing 4 zithers, 4 melodicas, 8 recorders, 8 sheep bells, 8 glasses, 4 mouth harmonicas; with amplification and tape
- Idyll (1974) For 4 soloists playing folk instruments (4 hurdy-gurdies, 4 bag pipes, 4 folk violins, 4 fifes, 16 bells) and tape
- Song (1974) For 4 - 6 optional melodic instruments
- One Piano Eight Hands (1973) For 4 musicians playing one upright piano out of tune
- String Quartet No. 2 (1970)
- Polychromy (1968)
- For clarinet, trombone, piano and cello
- String Quartet No. 1 (1965)
- Prime numbers (1961) For two violins
- Wind Trio (1958) For oboe, clarinet and bassoon

=== Piano ===
- La naissance et le deroulement d'un reve (2005)
- Refrain (1993)
- Blue Jay Way (1990)
- La chanson du mal-aimé (1990)
- Nightmare Tango (1987)
- From Keyboard to Score (1987)
- Ballade (1978)
- Music Box Waltz (1977)
- Gloves Music (1972)
- Stone Music (1972)
- Fallingwater (1971)
- Esquisse (1967)
- Triptych (1964)
- Five Unitary Piano Pieces (1963)
- Ohne Kontraste (1960)
- Monody and fugue (1959)
- Four dances (1959)
- Two inventions (1958)
- Seven interludes (1958)
- Prelude, intermezzo, postlude (1958)
- Five Piano Pieces (1958)
- Three etudes (1958)
- Theme with variations (1958)
- Six folk melodies (1958)
- Sonatina (1958)
- Three Preludes (1956)

=== Vocal ===
- Children's Requiem (2025) for soprano, baritone, children's choir, mixed choir and orchestra
- Podróż Chopina / Chopin's journey (2010) For chamber choir a capella or with folk instruments ensemble
- Ball In The Opera (2006) For chamber choir and 12 instruments Based on Julian Tuwim's text
- 5 Songs (2000) For baritone and piano For the poetry of Tadeusz Różewicz
- Trois chansons (1997) For mixed choir (16 singers) on poems by Claude Lefebvre
- La Terre (1995) For soprano, piano and orchestra Poems by Yves Bonnefoy
- Postcard from the Mountains (1988) For soprano and 8 instruments (flute, oboe, clarinet, vibraphone, violin, viola, cello and double-bass)
- Malay Pantuns (1961) For three flutes and alto voice (or mezzo-soprano)

=== Opera ===
- Bona Sforza ("Bona Sforza", 2024) opera in two acts. Libretto: Vincenzo de Vivo.
- Ślub ("The Marriage", 2024) opera in three acts. Libretto: Krzysztof Cicheński after Witold Gombrowicz.
- Noc kruków ("Night of the Ravens", 2022) for soloists, orchestra and choir. Libretto: Małgorzata Sikorska-Miszczuk after Adam Mickiewicz. Premiered on 2 July 2022 at the Polish Royal Opera in Warsaw, opening the company's fifth festival.
- Yemaya - Królowa Mórz ("Yemaya - Queen of the Seas", 2019), family opera for soloists, mixed choir, boys choir and orchestra. Libretto: Małgorzata Sikorska – Miszczuk.
- Olimpia z Gdańska ("Olympia of Gdansk", 2015) an opera in nine scenes for soloists, symphony ocherstra and choir. Libretto: Blaise de Obaldia, Krystyna de Obaldia.
- Pułapka ("The Trap", 2011) an opera in one act for soloists, symphony orchestra and choir. Libretto: Grzegorz Jarzyna after Tadeusz Różewicz's drama.
- Polieukt ("Polyeucte", 2010) an opera in five acts. Libretto: Alicja Choińska and Jorge Lavelli after Pierre Corneille's drama Polyeucte for soloists, chamber choir and orchestra.
- Iwona, księżniczka Burgunda "Yvonne, Princess of Burgundy," (2004) an opera in four acts for soloists, chamber choir and orchestra. Libretto by Grzegorz Jarzyna and the composer after Witold Gombrowicz's theater play.
- Baltazar ("Balthasar," 2001) an opera in two acts Libretto: Ryszard Peryt after Stanisław Wyspiański's theater play Daniel.
- Gwiazda ("The Star") an opera in one act. First version (1981) for 2 sopranos, 2 mezzo-sopranos, alto voice; tenor saxophone, trumpet, percussion, accordion, electric guitar, violin and double-bass. Second version (1994) for soprano, mezzo-soprano, orchestra, choir and ballet. Third version (2006) for soprano, computer and two camera-men. Libretto: Helmut Kajzar.

=== Music for Theatre ===
- Moliere: El Avaro (2010)
- Sophocles: Oedipus Rex (2008)
- Tankret Dorst: Merlin (2005) For string orchestra, three voices, harp, flute, percussion
- Eugène Ionesco: Macbett (1992) For mixed choir (16 singers), clarinet, trombone, percussion, synthesizer, piano, upright piano out of tune, violin, cello and double-bass
- Witold Gombrowicz: Opérette (1988) For clarinet, trumpet, trombone, piano, percussion, violin, double-bass
- François Billetdoux: Réveille-toi, Philadelphie! (1988) For clarinet, trombone, harp, accordion, guitar, piano, percussion, violin, double-bass and tape
- Federico Garcia Lorca: Le Public (1988) For clarinet, trumpet, trombone, electric guitar, percussion, violin, double-bass
- Pierre Corneille: Polyeucte (1987) For flute, Arabian flute (ney), French horn, piano, percussion, bells, harp, double-bass and tape

=== Musical Space Compositions ===
- Aria (2007) Unlimited duration 21 sound sources (63 loudspeakers) in an exhibition hall
- The Underground River (1987) Collaboration with Jan Muniak and Wieslaw Nowak - architects For 7 tapes
- Fête galante et pastorale (1974) First version: Spatial composition for 6 groups of instruments and 13 tapes
- Fête galante et pastorale (1984) Second version: Spatial composition for 13 group of instruments, 5 voices and 13 tapes
- Automatophone (1974) Spatial Composition for 15 music boxes and 15 plucked instruments with amplification
- Spatial Composition No. 2 (1970) Collaboration with Teresa Kelm - architect For 2 tapes
- Spatial Composition No. 1 (1968) Collaboration with Teresa Kelm - architect and Henryk Morel - sculptor For 6 tapes

== See also ==
- Tomasz Sikorski

== Sources ==
- Krystyna Tarnawska-Kaczorowska: Zygmunt Krauze - między intelektem, fantazją, powinnością i zabawą (Zygmunt Krauze – between intellect, fantasy, obligation and amusement), Wydawnictwo Naukowe PWN, Warsaw 2001, ISBN 83-01-13426-7
