= War (Henry Cow song) =

1975 song written by Anthony Moore and Peter Blegvad for Slapp Happy

Song by Slapp Happy with Henry Cow

from the album In Praise of Learning
- Released: 9 May 1975
- Recorded: November 1974
- Studio: The Manor, Oxfordshire, England
- Genre: Experimental rock
- Length: 2:23
- Label: Virgin
- Composer: Anthony Moore
- Lyricist: Peter Blegvad
- Producers: Slapp Happy, Henry Cow, Simon Heyworth

"War" (originally entitled "War (Is Energy Enslaved)") is a 1975 song composed by Anthony Moore with lyrics by Peter Blegvad for the German-English avant-pop group Slapp Happy. It was recorded in November 1974 by Slapp Happy with the English experimental rock band Henry Cow for their collaborative album Desperate Straights, but released the following May as the opening track on Henry Cow's In Praise of Learning.

Moore later rearranged "War" for his 1979 solo album, Flying Doesn't Help, crediting himself as Anthony More. The song was also covered by the Fall on their 1994 album, Middle Class Revolt, and Sol Invictus used Blegvad's lyrics for their version of "War" on their 2014 album, Once Upon A Time. A jazz interpretation of "War" was recorded by the Michel Edelin Quintet with spoken texts by John Greaves and released on their 2019 album, Echoes of Henry Cow.

== Development ==
After recording their first album for Virgin Records, Slapp Happy (also known as Casablanca Moon) in early 1974, Slapp Happy returned to the studio in May that year, and using session musicians, they recorded two new compositions Moore and Blegvad had written, "Europa" and "War (Is Energy Enslaved)". Virgin had requested a single that was "radio friendly", but upon hearing the songs they rejected them, stating that they felt they were better suited for an album. Blegvad and Moore set to work producing more music, but soon realised that the material they had written was beyond what they could handle on their own. This led to Slapp Happy asking Henry Cow to be their backing band on their second album for Virgin. After discussions between the two bands, they collaborated in November 1974 to record Desperate Straights as "Slapp Happy/Henry Cow".

"Europa" and "War (Is Energy Enslaved)" were re-recorded for Desperate Straights, but only "Europa" was used. "War", with its contracted title, was released on their second collaborative album, In Praise of Learning (1975), as it was felt that the song, with its Brechtian themes and Krause's "Mother Courage performance", seemed better suited for the latter album. "War" was always planned for Desperate Straights, and the third track of the album, "A Worm Is at Work" includes the line "a pissy myth about birth of War", which refers to the song "War". When it became clear that "War" was not going to be included on Desperate Straights, a footnote was added to the "A Worm Is at Work" lyrics in the album's liner notes stating: "The reference is to 'War (Energy Enslaved)', a Moore/Blegvad composition still in the throes of release."

"War", and the next track on In Praise of Learning, "Living in the Heart of the Beast", were later remixed by Fred Frith, Tim Hodgkinson and Martin Bisi, and were released by East Side Digital Records on the 1991 CD reissue of the album. The original mixes of "War" and "Living in the Heart of the Beast" were used on all subsequent reissues of the album.

== Title ==
The original title of the song, "War (Is Energy Enslaved)" was taken from the line "For war is energy enslaved, but thy religion" in the poem, Vala, or The Four Zoas – Night the Ninth by William Blake. Blegvad said the song's refrain, "violence completes the partial mind" is a quote from W. B. Yeats.

== Composition ==
Even though "War" was recorded during the Desperate Straights sessions, it is very different from the other songs on that album. Trond Einar Garmo wrote in Henry Cow: An Analysis of Avant-Garde Rock that "distorted guitars and noise" are used in the song, and Krause "sings with a very broken accent and a distorted sprechstimme". Garmo noted that the song's lyrics are Blegvad's "surrealistic explanation" of the origins of war.

In his 2019 book Henry Cow: The World Is a Problem, musicologist Benjamin Piekut noted "a tightly controlled accompaniment" that Moore wrote to Blegvad's lyrics. It has a fixed eighth-note pulse with "bars of uneven meters" and a "vocal melody that hovers around the fifth scale degree" which ends each alternate line with the tonic. The chorus ("Upon her spoon this motto ...") changes briefly to lines of 4/4. Piekut said Blegvad's poetry in "War" consists of "tight rhyming couplets (AA)", which change to (ABAB) in the last four lines to emphasize the closing message. His text is also full of imagery: war starts as a fetus, which becomes a "hateful baby banging its spoon against its plate", and then a woman "lead[ing] pilgrims on a destructive march in the name of peace and fame".

Writing in Beyond and Before: Progressive Rock Since the 1960s, Paul Hegarty and Martin Halliwell suggest that war in the song is created by an unnamed goddess and becomes "a necessity" in "the struggle for existence against oppression".

== Reception ==
In a 1975 review of In Praise of Learning in New Musical Express, music critic Ian MacDonald described "War" as "a cauldron of boiling sound" that "heaves and thrashes like an octopus caught in a ship's propellor [sic]". He said Krause skillfully negotiates the "ragged obstacle course of downbeat mythologising and exploding musique concrete". In another 1975 review, Dave Laing wrote in Let It Rock that Krause's vocals on War have the same "brittle style" that American singer and songwriter Judy Collins used in her version of Kurt Weill's "Pirate Jenny" and the play Marat/Sade.

A reviewer at AllMusic described the Moore and Blegvad song as "enormous [in] proportion and power" that would not have succeeded in the hands of the "relatively quiet" Slapp Happy. The Trouser Press Record Guide said Blegvad's lyrics on "War" are "mythologizing", and the music "worthy of Kurt Weill".

Piekut called "War" a "little two-minute epic", and Krause the "star" of the show with her "clipped, almost sneering" delivery. He said the non-stop barrage of rhyming couplets leave one breathless, making the two instrumental interludes a welcome relief. Piekut equated Krause's performance on the song with that of Mother Courage in Brecht's 1939 play Mother Courage and Her Children.

== Personnel ==
Henry Cow/Slapp Happy

- Dagmar Krause (credited as "Dagmar") – voice
- Peter Blegvad – voice, clarinet
- Anthony Moore – piano, electronics and tapework
- Fred Frith – guitar
- John Greaves – bass guitar
- Chris Cutler – drums, radio

Additional musicians

- Geoff Leigh – soprano saxophone
- Mongezi Feza – trumpet

== Works cited ==
- Cutler, Chris, ed. (2019). "Book 1 | The Studio: Official Releases". The Henry Cow Box Redux: The Complete Henry Cow (box set booklet). Henry Cow. London: Recommended Records.
- Garmo, Trond Einar (2020). Henry Cow: An Analysis of Avant Garde Rock. London: ReR Megacorp / November Books. ISBN 978-0-95601-84-4-1.
- Hegarty, Paul; Halliwell, Martin (2011). Beyond and Before: Progressive Rock Since the 1960s. London: Bloomsbury Publishing. ISBN 978-1-4411-1480-8.
- Piekut, Benjamin (2019). Henry Cow: The World Is a Problem. Duke University Press. ISBN 978-1-47800-405-9.
