= Live in Japan (Slapp Happy album) =

Live album by Slapp Happy
- Released: 2001
- Recorded: May 2000
- Venue: Tokyo, Sapporo, Kyoto
- Genre: Avant-rock; avant-pop
- Length: 55:21
- Label: FMN (Japan)
- Producer: Anthony Moore

Slapp Happy chronology
Ça Va (1998)	Live in Japan (2001)

Professional ratings
Review scores
Source	Rating
AllMusic	4/5 stars

Live in Japan is a 2001 live album by German-British avant-pop group Slapp Happy, recorded in Tokyo, Sapporo and Kyoto, Japan in May 2000. They performed without any backing musicians and played all the instruments themselves. Material for this album was drawn from four of their studio albums, Sort Of, Slapp Happy/Acnalbasac Noom, Desperate Straights and Ça Va.

A free bonus single "Coralie" was given to subscribers of the album.

== Track listing ==
No.	Title	Writer(s)	Length
1.	"King of Straw"	Blegvad/Gregson	3:17
2.	"Slow Moon's Rose"	Moore	3:52
3.	"Michelangelo"	Blegvad/Moore	2:47
4.	"Riding Tigers"	Blegvad	2:00
5.	"Small Hands of Stone"	Blegvad/Moore	3:23
6.	"Haiku"	Blegvad/Moore	3:58
7.	"Is it You?"	Krause/Moore	5:26
8.	"Casablanca Moon"	Blegvad/Moore	3:05
9.	"Moon Lovers"	Krause/Latham	2:51
10.	"Strayed"	Blegvad	2:13
11.	"A Little Something"	Blegvad	3:51
12.	"I'm All Alone"	Moore	3:49
13.	"The Unborn Byron"	Blegvad/Moore	2:50
14.	"Scarred for Life"	Blegvad	3:37
15.	"Who's Gonna Help Me Now?"	Blegvad/Moore	3:16
16.	"Let's Travel Light"	Blegvad	4:54

== Personnel ==
- Anthony Moore – keyboards, guitar, vocals, harmonica, shaker
- Peter Blegvad – guitar, vocals, percussion, harmonica
- Dagmar Krause – vocals, percussion, keyboards, harmonica

=== Production ===
Recorded live in May 2000 at Star Pine's Cafe in Tokyo, at Bessie Hall in Sapporo, and at Seibu Auditorium in Kyoto.

- Anthony Moore – edited, mixed and mastered
- Peter Blegvad – art direction and lettering on the disk
- Kazuhiro Nishiwaki – illustration and lettering on the cover
- Toshi Ota – photography
