= Slap happy =

Slap happy may refer to:

- Slap-Happy, an album by American rock band L7
- Slap Happy Cartoons, a Canadian animation company
- Slap Happy, a pornographic film series
- Slaphappy: Pride, Prejudice, and Professional Wrestling, a nonfiction book by Thomas Hackett
- Slapp Happy, a German rock band
  - Slapp Happy (album), the band's second album

== See also ==
- Slap Happy Lion
- Slap Happy Pappy
- Slaphappy Sleuths
- Happy slapping
