= The Artaud Beats =

British progressive rock group

- Origin: United Kingdom
- Genres: Progressive rock
- Years active: 2009–present
- Spinoff of: Henry Cow
- Members: John Greaves; Chris Cutler; Geoff Leigh; Yumi Hara Cawkwell
- Website: www.facebook.com/theartaudbeats

The Artaud Beats is a progressive rock band consisting of John Greaves (bass, vocals), Chris Cutler (drums) and Geoff Leigh (soprano sax, flute, vocals, electronics), all formerly members of Henry Cow, and Yumi Hara Cawkwell (piano, vocals).

== History ==
Cawkwell and Leigh had released an album together, Upstream, and were booked to play the Avantgarde Festival (Schiphorst, Germany) in 2009 having previously toured Japan. Cutler and Greaves were both attending the same festival to play with the Peter Blegvad Trio and Dagmar Krause. However, the four decided to play an improvised set together in Cawkwell and Leigh's slot as a partial Henry Cow reunion, under the name Not Henry Cow.

Adopting the name The Artaud Beats, they performed at the Nødutgang Festivalen in 2011 and played a ten-date Japanese tour in June 2012. They returned to Japan in 2013 for fourteen concerts; in 2014 they performed at the first Rock in Opposition Festival in Tokyo, and the Fort Process experimental music festival in Newhaven, near Brighton, UK. The CD Logos was released in 2015 – they played a presentation concert in Paris.

== Discography ==
- Logos, 2015, Bonobo's Ark Records: BAR004
