= Flying Doesn't Help =

Studio album by Anthony Moore
- Released: 1979
- Recorded: The Workhouse Studios, Old Kent Road, London
- Genre: Progressive rock, experimental rock, post-punk
- Length: 37:11
- Label: Quango; Voiceprint
- Producer: Laurie Latham; Anthony Moore

Anthony Moore chronology
Out (1976)	Flying Doesn't Help (1979)	World Service (1981)

Flying Doesn't Help is a solo album by Anthony Moore (credited on the album sleeve as 'A. More'), released by Quango in 1979. The album was remastered and re-released on CD by the Voiceprint label in 1994.

The Moore/Blegvad song, "War" was originally recorded in 1974 by Henry Cow and Slapp Happy, and released on their 1975 album, In Praise of Learning.

== Track listing ==
All tracks are written by Anthony Moore, except where noted.

Side one
No.	Title	Length
1.	"Judy Get Down"	2:58
2.	"Ready Ready"	3:09
3.	"Useless Moments"	2:48
4.	"Lucia"	4:38
5.	"Caught Being in Love"	4:57

Side two
No.	Title	Length
1.	"Timeless Strange"	3:44
2.	"Girl It's Your Time"	3:19
3.	"War" (Moore, Blegvad)	4:23
4.	"Just Us"	4:14
5.	"Twilight (Uxbridge Rd.)"	2:22

1994 CD reissue
No.	Title	Length
1.	"Judy Get Down"	2:58
2.	"Ready Ready"	3:09
3.	"Useless Moments"	2:48
4.	"Lucia"	4:38
5.	"Caught Being in Love"	4:57
6.	Untitled	0:35
7.	"Timeless Strange"	3:44
8.	"Girl It's Your Time"	3:19
9.	"War" (Moore, Blegvad)	4:23
10.	"Just Us"	4:14
11.	"Twilight, Uxbridge Rd."	2:22

== Personnel ==
- Anthony Moore – vocals, guitars, keyboards, electronics, backing vocals
- Bob Shilling, Chris Slade, Robert Vogel, Charles Hayward – drums
- Festus, Sam Harley, Matt Irving – bass
- Bernie Clark – keyboards
- Laurie Latham – saxophone, mouth harp, backing vocals
- Edwin Cross – backing vocals

Produced by Anthony Moore and Laurie Latham
Engineered by Laurie Latham and Edwin Cross
Remastered for CD by Tony Arnold

== Reviews ==
Professional ratings
Review scores
Source	Rating
AllMusic	4.5/5 stars

"Building dense sonic forests filled with jagged splinters and dry, incongruously delicate vocals, the results fall somewhere between Peter Gabriel, John Cale, David Bowie and Kevin Ayers. An extraordinary record that reveals itself a little further each time it's played." – Trouser Press

"While much of Moore's earlier work is pleasant, yet dispensable, Flying Doesn't Help falls into a different class altogether. Elaborate yet accessible, the effects of More's (now minus one "o") masterwork can be felt on a number of levels." – All Music

== Variations ==
The album was released with at least four different colored covers—Red (as shown above), Silver, Purple and Yellow.
