= BHB =

BHB may refer to:

- Ballas Hough Band, a band formed by dancers Mark Ballas and Derek Hough
  - BHB (album), the debut album by the Ballas Hough Band
- β-Hydroxybutyric acid, also known as β-hydroxybutyrate
- British Horseracing Board, former governing board for horse racing in Great Britain
- Hancock County–Bar Harbor Airport, airport near Bar Harbor, Maine with IATA code BHB
- a weapon system described in the book, Endgame: The Blueprint for Victory in the War on Terror
- New People's Army (Filipino: Bagong Hukbong Bayan)
- Bobby Hammer Band, a band formed by Austrian musician Robert Haumer
