= Geoff Leigh =

English musician (born 1945)

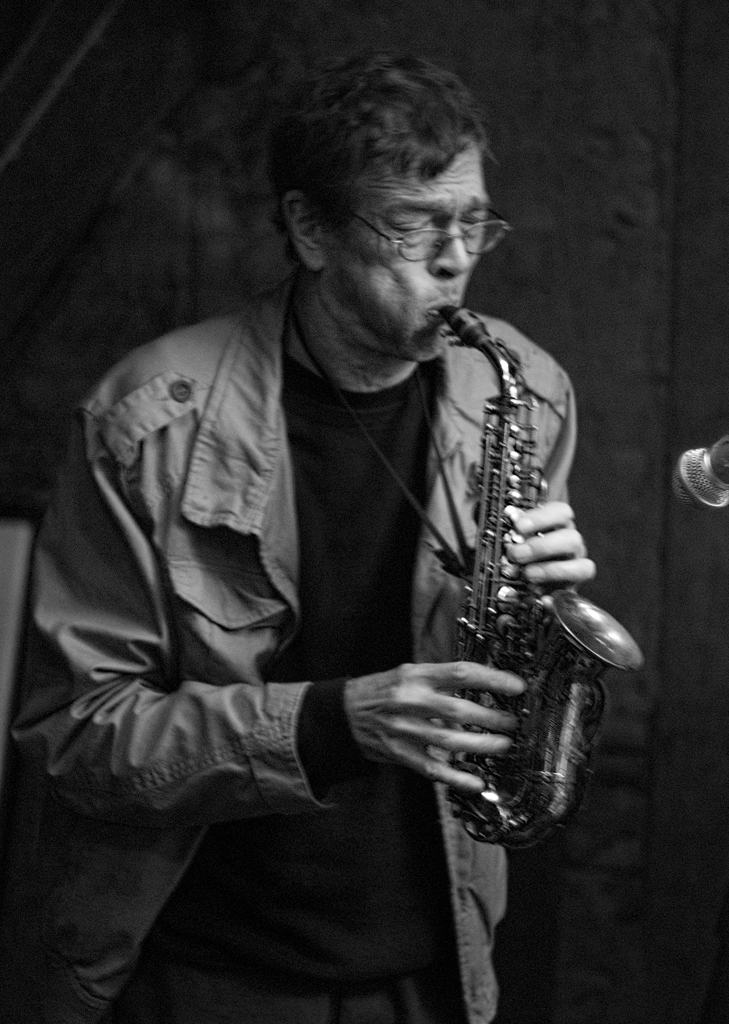
- Leigh performing in Schiphorst, Germany, 30 August 2009

Background information
- Born: Geoff Leigh; 5 October 1945 (age 80); Manchester, England
- Genres: Jazz fusion, world, progressive rock, electroacoustic, experimental
- Occupation: Musician
- Instruments: Saxophones, flutes, voice, keyboards, electronics, laptop processing
- Years active: 1968–present

Geoff Leigh (born 5 October 1945) is an English jazz and progressive rock musician, playing primarily soprano saxophone and flute. He was a member of the English avant-rock group Henry Cow and founded several bands himself, including Red Balune, Random Bob, Black Sheep, Mirage, and Ex-Wise Heads.

== History ==
=== Early career ===
Geoff Leigh's first gigs were with soul music bands in Manchester in 1965, (the beginnings of the Northern soul scene), in clubs such as the Twisted Wheel. His professional career began in 1968, touring the United Kingdom and Europe with various jazz-rock-progressive rock groups, mainly Crazy Mabel. In 1969 he joined G. F. Fitzgerald's band Mouseproof, which introduced Leigh to the budding Canterbury scene and musicians like Daevid Allen, Kevin Ayers, and Robert Wyatt.

=== Henry Cow ===
In the early 1970s Leigh performed with Henry Cow on several occasions; he had known the band's drummer Chris Cutler from school. Leigh accepted Henry Cow's invitation to join the band in 1972, and he played on their first album Legend (1973). After a tour of the Netherlands at the end of 1973 he left the band, as he preferred playing composed over improvised music. The band's timeline of its history in the 1991 CD of Legend stated that Leigh left because he was "apparently unhappy with [the] increasingly total & scheduled group life."

As Henry Cow were signed to Virgin Records at the time, Leigh took advantage of Virgin's network of artists and performed and recorded with a number of their musicians and groups, including Slapp Happy and Hatfield and the North. In November 1973, Leigh participated in a live-in-the-studio performance of Mike Oldfield's Tubular Bells for the BBC, with Mick Taylor, Steve Hillage and members of Henry Cow, Gong and Soft Machine. It was released on Oldfield's Elements DVD. He also guested on Henry Cow's album In Praise of Learning (1975).

=== Radar Favourites ===
In 1974, Leigh formed Radar Favourites, with Gerry Fitzgerald (vocals, guitar), Cathy Williams (keyboards, vocals), Jack Monck (bass guitar) and Charles Hayward (drums). After only a few months, musical differences led to Monck and Fitgerald leaving, to be replaced by Charles Bullen (guitar), and Alan Möller (bass). The group disbanded the following year after unsuccessful negotiations with Virgin Records – Hayward and Bullen went on to form This Heat. Leigh and Cathy Williams embarked on a long musical relationship – their first project was a duo, Rag Doll, followed by Red Balune, a music theatre collective they formed in 1976. Red Balune grew over the next few years and attracted a number of musicians, including Colin McClure (bass), Robin Musgrove (drums), Henk Weltevreden (keyboards), Aloijsius van Saus (industrial sounds and performance), and Anne-Marie Roeloffs (trombone).

In December 1977, Red Balune toured the Netherlands and returned to England in January 1978 to begin recording an album. The album was never finished, but they did release a single, "Spider in Love" c/w "Capitalist Kid", in 1978, on their own MCCB record label, which became a "seminal underground classic". In April 1978 the band relocated to the Netherlands, recording the EP Maximum Penalty in early 1979, which featured guest appearances by ex-Henry Cow members Fred Frith (guitar, violin), Tim Hodgkinson (keyboards, alto saxophone, clarinet), Chris Cutler (piano scrapes and general burning ideas), and Aksak Maboul founder Marc Hollander (bass clarinet).

=== Univers Zero and the 1980s ===
By then Leigh was spending more time in Brussels, playing with experimental bands Aksak Maboul and Univers Zéro, and after the release of his solo EP Chemical Bank in 1979, played solo performances for almost eighteen months, mainly in Belgium and France. In 1981 Leigh moved back to Rotterdam and formed the Kontakt Mikrofoon Orkest, featuring Colin McClure, Aloijsius van Saus (vocals, guitar, alto sax, keyboards, electronics), Gert van Seters (drums), and Jos Valster (saxophones and clarinets). This short-lived group recorded one single on the MCCB label, "Living in Rotterdam"/"Do the Residue", before splitting in late 1981. But the seeds of Black Sheep were sown with Colin McLure and Aloijsius van Saus. In 1981 they released a 12-inch maxi single, "Animal Sounds", and contributed "Strangelove" (on which Zeena Parkins made her recording debut, as backing vocalist) to a Recommended Records compilation disc. They toured extensively in the Netherlands, Belgium, France, Switzerland, Sweden, and Yugoslavia.

After leaving the Black Sheep in 1982, Leigh formed several bands which owed more to world music than any of his previous work, the most long-standing being Random Bob, featuring Colin McClure, Henk Weltevreden, and percussionist Asad Oberoi, later replaced by drummer/percussionist Coen Aalberts.

In 1986, Leigh headed back to Brussels, where he became even more closely involved in the world music scene, performing with Algerian singer Hamsy Boubaker, and Moroccan oud players Hassan Erragi and Abid. With Abid he co-composed and performed the music for a one-woman theatre production with Tunisian-Belgian actress Sabra Ben Arfa, produced by Moroccan actor-producer Amid Chakir, a close associate of Belgian film maker Chantal Akerman. The play was performed many times in Belgium, Tunisia, and Egypt. Around this time Leigh also had a long-term musical partnership with Moroccan guimbri player, vocalist, and percussionist Jalil El Afra.

Leigh continued working with Rotterdam-based percussionist Asad Oberoi, composing and performing music for several dance productions. Via his contacts in Brussels he worked with film maker Alain de Halleux on many TV and movie ads, including a trilogy of ads for Perrier. Several short-lived duos and one-off projects from this period included musicians John van Rymenant (saxophones, electronics, programming), Peter Beyls (self-designed software, controllers, interfaces, electronics), Claude Janssens (alto saxophone, trombone, programming). Leigh played with Pierre Jacob (keyboards, flutes, percussion, vocals) in the fusion group Sables from 1988 until 1992, and in 1988 formed the Morton Fork Gang with British saxophonist Joe Higham – the band included Daniel Denis (drums) and Guy Segers (bass guitar) from Univers Zéro, cellist Jan Kuijken, and saxophonists Mark Bogaerts and Daniel Stokart.

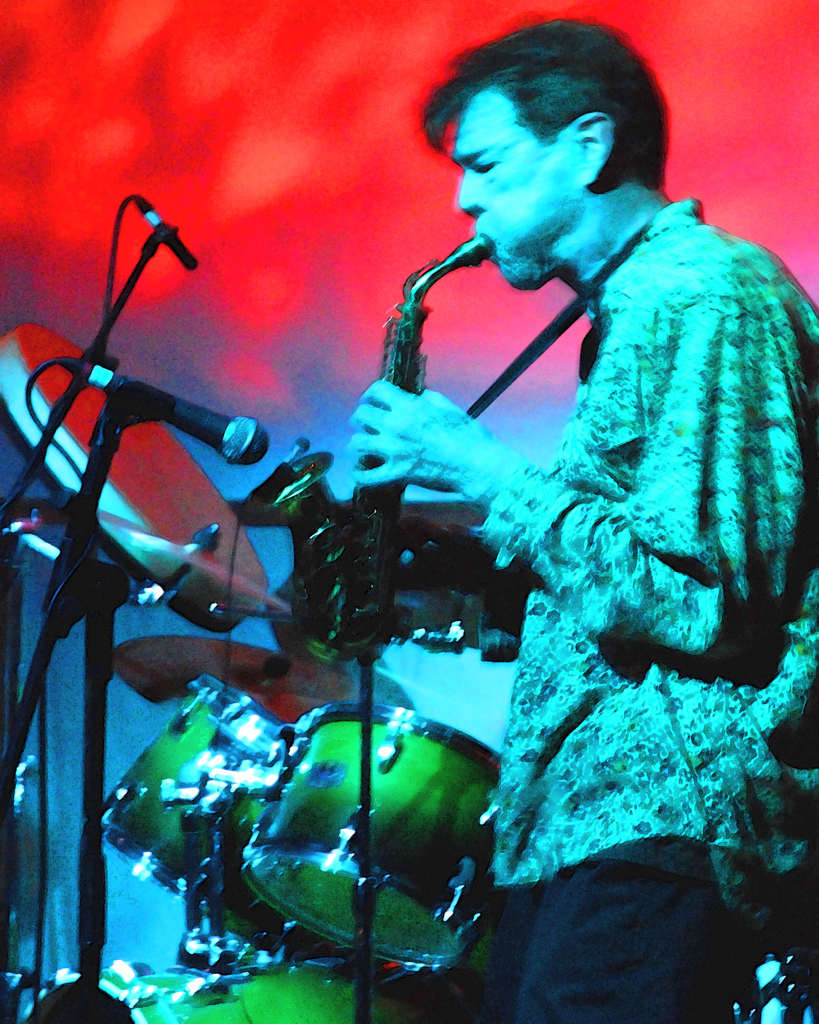
Leigh performing in 2008

=== Illness and semi-retirement ===
In 1992 Leigh was diagnosed with dystonia, an incurable neurological condition, contracted after a badly performed dental operation some two years earlier, which affected his performing capabilities to such an extent that he eventually stopped playing altogether. He managed to fulfil some concert obligations with Morton Fork and Sables in Brussels in early 1993, and after returning permanently to the UK, rehearsed and performed in small venues with original Radar Favourites bassist Jack Monck and Moroccan percussionist Lahcen Lahbib, as the Highly Irregulars.

=== Back to work ===
In 1999 he formed the ethno-fusion band Ex-Wise Heads with bass-guimbri player Colin Edwin from progressive rock band Porcupine Tree. A chance meeting in 2002 with Berliner Tom Zunk (waterphone and Indonesian percussion) led to the formation of the duo Men Working Overhead, which performed several concerts in Germany and London between 2002 and 2004, often augmented by dancer-video artist Elke Postler.

Since the re-release in 2005 of the entire MCCB back catalogue on Ad Hoc Records, a subsidiary of Recommended Records, the Black Sheep recorded the album Out of Quarantine, featuring both previously unreleased material from 1981 to 1982 and recordings from 2005. As a result of renewed interest in the MCCB release, Leigh and Cathy Williams formed the band Mirage. They released their second album, Child's Play, in 2007, augmenting the group with Sam Christie (percussion), and Gem McSweeney (mandolin and various strings, flutes, and percussion).

In July 2005 Leigh played a one-off concert in London with Faust founder members Jean-Hervé Péron and Werner "Zappi" Diermaier, then played with Lucianne Lassalle (voice, electronics) as Henrico Reed & Lulu at the Faust Avant Garde Festival near Hamburg in September 2005. The duo performed again on the 2006 festival, and also contributed to the Faust UK tour in October/November 2005. A box set, Faust....in Autumn was released on Dirter Records in December 2006, featuring the band and both Leigh and Lassalle. Leigh performed solo at the 2008 Faust festival.

== Other projects ==
In 2009, Leigh was involved in several projects, including solo performances, a duo with Simon Crab (laptop processing, ex– Bourbonese Qualk), and several on–line collaborations. He also has several archive releases in the pipeline, including a Radar Favourites album release, and possibly an album from the Morton Fork Gang. An album with Japanese pianist–vocalist–composer Yumi Hara Cawkwell was released in June. He has become something of a regular at Hastings Electric Palace Cinema, recently voted one of The Guardian's Top Ten UK arthouse cinemas, contributing live improvised soundscapes to short experimental movies.

Other activities in 2009 included a solo performance at the Kraak Festival in Brussels in March, five concerts and two workshops in Japan with Yumi Hara, plus a guest appearance with Japanese psychedelic rock band Acid Mothers Temple. Leigh and Yumi Hara were joined by Japanese drummer Tatsuya Yoshida for a concert in Tokyo. Saxophonist Ryoko Ono also guested on one concert. In August, Leigh performed at the annual Avant Garde Festival in Schiphorst, Germany, with Yumi Hara and ex–Henry Cow members Chris Cutler (drums) and John Greaves (bass and vocals), which led to them forming The Artaud Beats. He was also invited to perform with Nurse With Wound. In late October 2009, Leigh played solo at the Nodutgang Festival in Bodo, Norway, and several concerts in Sweden with Magnus Alexanderson (guitar and electronics).

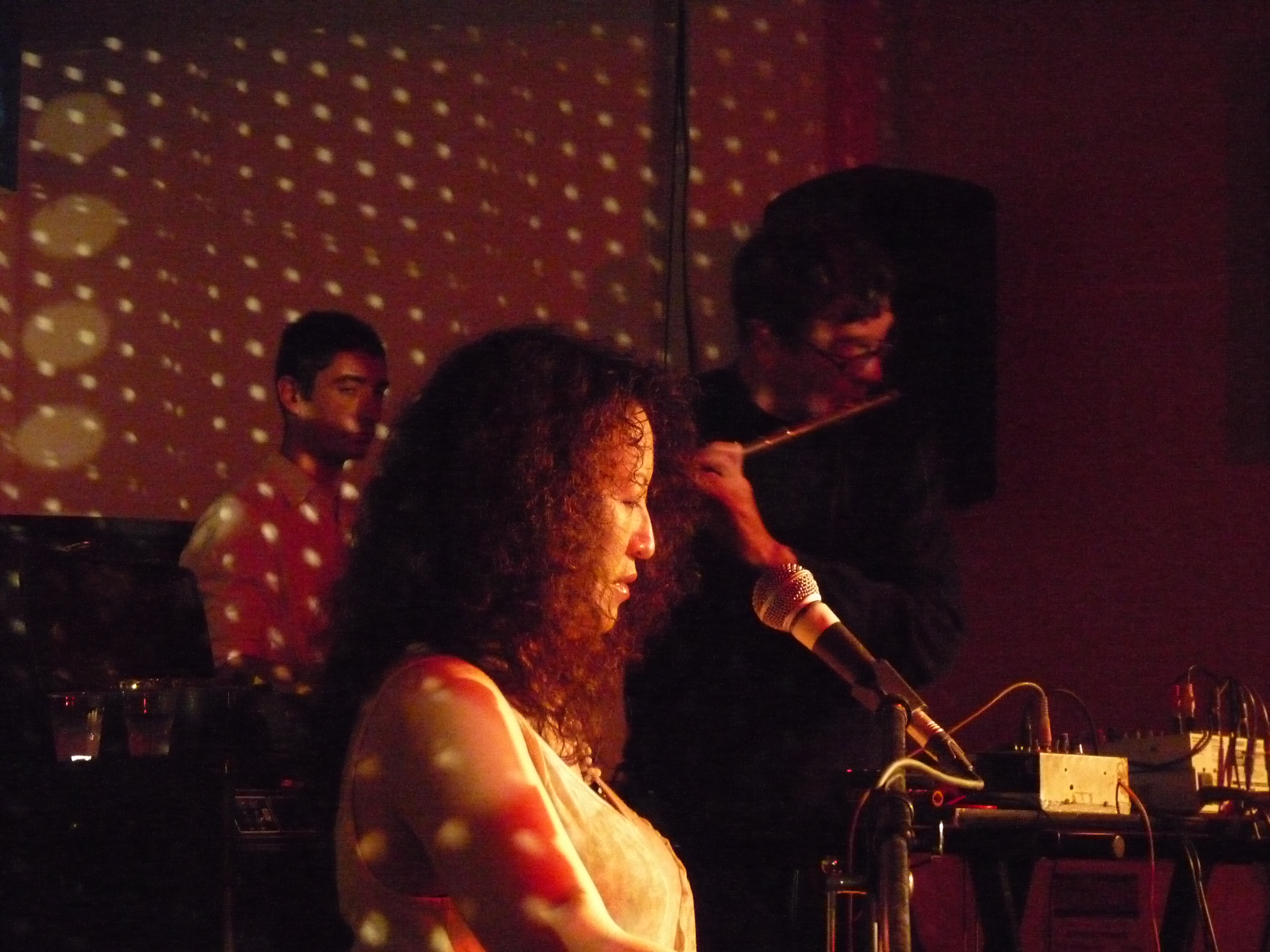
Leigh (rightmost) performing with Yumi Hara in London, 15 May 2009

In 2010, after playing a short tour of Italy in February with guitarist Adriano Lanzi, Leigh decided to take a break from live performances due to ongoing dental problems, which had obliged him to temporarily stop playing saxophone. However the year saw a handful of local performances, including two appearances at Brighton's Spirit of Gravity, one with the Warrior Squares, the second with cellist Bela Emerson. Three new albums were released: Radar Favourites, Ex Wise Heads, and Uwe Bastiansen's Stadtfischflex, featuring Leigh alongside Jean–Herve Peron and Zappi Diermaier (Faust), and Tim Hodgkinson (Henry Cow).

2011 – Three concerts in Italy and three in France with Stadtfischflex; various ensembles at the Schiphorst Festival; a solo performance in St. Petersburg. The Artaud Beats play in Norway.

2012 – Ex Wise Heads play in Ukraine, Estonia, and Holland; The Artaud Beats play ten concerts in Japan; Leigh plays in various ensembles at the Schiphorst Festival.

2013 – The Artaud Beats play fourteen concerts in Japan. Leigh records material with guitarist Mark Hewins.

2014 – The Artaud Beats play the Fort Process festival (their UK debut), and two concerts in Japan, including the first Rock in Opposition Festival in Tokyo; Leigh plays seven other concerts there, with various line–ups including guitarist Makoto Kawabata (Acid Mothers Temple), Max Manac'h (Faust), Rie Miyazaki, Morhide Sawada, Shizuku Aosaki, and Yumiko Yoshimoto. A new project, Jump for Joy, with Leigh, Jean–Herve Peron, Zappi Diermaier, Chris Cutler, and Yumi Hara headlines the Schiphorst Festival.

2015 – Concert/radio broadcast in Rome (Italy) with K–Mundi Trio (Adriano Lanzi, Filippo Okapi, and Marco Ariano); The Artaud Beats present their new album Logos at Le Triton in Paris; Leigh plays a festival in Lille (France) with Max Manach, Valentin Carette, and Ciro Martin as "Haricot Massacre". Concerts in London include a trio with Max Manac'h and Jean–Herve Peron, and various combinations with Yumi Hara, Guy Harries, Chris Cutler, and Tim Hodgkinson. Jump For Joy (2014 lineup plus Geraldine Swayne) play in Gothenburg, Sweden. The concert was recorded for Swedish Radio and subsequently released on vinyl and CD as "Bat Pullover".

2016 – The Artaud Beats play the Copenhagen Jazz Festival. Leigh plays eight concerts in Japan with Makoto Kawabata, and other concerts with Tatsuya Yoshida, Kazuto Shimizu, Mitsuru Tabata, and Darren Moore. Jump For Joy play the Rock in Opposition Festival in France. The Warrior Squares continue playing in Hastings, Brighton, and London. Leigh and Kawabata release their first CD "Spatial Roots". Leigh appeared with the Murmurists at Cafe OTO in London.

2017 – Leigh and Makoto Kawabata tour in UK and Western Europe. Warrior Squares continue to play regular gigs. Leigh plays concerts and records two albums for release in 2018 with Haricot Massacre and VI!VI!VI!, both based in Lille, France. Jump For Joy release "Keeping Score", a live recording of their 2016 concert at the Rock in Opposition Festival in France. Leigh performs with Faust in UK.

2018 – Warrior Squares perform their own set and as members of ex-Can vocalist Damo Suzuki's "Sound Carriers" in Hastings. Leigh and Kawabata tour UK, Netherlands, and Belgium, and Leigh plays several UK concerts with AMT.

2019 – Some recording activities and a handful of concerts.

2020 – COVID-19.

== Discography ==
- 1970 Mouseproof: Mouseproof ##
- 1970 Mary-Anne Paterson: Me ##
- 1971 Valérie Lagrange: I love you so (Credited as Jeoff Leigh)
- 1971 Zakarrias: Zakarrias
- 1971 Crazy Mabel: Crazy Mabel
- 1973 Henry Cow: Legend
- 1974 Henry Cow: Greasy Truckers Live at Dingwalls Dance Hall (side 2)
- 1974 Slapp Happy: Slapp Happy
- 1974 Hatfield and the North: Hatfield and the North
- 1975 Slapp Happy/Henry Cow: Desperate Straights
- 1975 Henry Cow/Slapp Happy: In Praise of Learning
- 1978 Red Balune: Spider in Love / Capitalist Kid #
- 1979 Red Balune: Maximum Penalty #
- 1979 Geoff Leigh: Chemical Bank #
- 1979 Pierre Vassiliu: Vassiliu (Credited as Jeff Leigh)
- 1981 Kontakt Mikrofoon Orkest: Living in Rotterdam / Do the Residue #
- 1981 Black Sheep: Animal Sounds #
- 1981 Black Sheep: Strangelove (ReR compilation) #
- 1981 Pierre Vassiliu: Le Cadeau
- 1982 Pierre Vassiliu: Presentement (Credited as Jeff Leigh)
- 1987 Hamsy Boubaker: ?
- 1988 Geoff Leigh and Frank Wuyts: From Here to Drums
- 1988 Geoff Leigh: The Russians are Coming
- 1989 9T2: Why Politicize?
- 1989 Pierre Jacob: Sables
- 1990 Bassline Boys: Baby B
- 1994 Robert Wyatt: Flotsam Jetsam (One track with Slapp Happy & guests)
- 1999 Ex-Wise Heads: Everything is Hear
- 2001 Steven Wilson: I.E.M. Have Come for Your Children
- 2000 Ex-Wise Heads: No Grey Matter
- 2003 Ex-Wise Heads: Time and Emotion Study
- 2005 MCCB Compilation: Things from the Past (CD + digital download)
- 2006 Uli Trepte: Multiphonic Music
- 2006 Ex-Wise Heads: Holding Up the Sky
- 2006 Mirage: Mirage
- 2006 Faust: Faust...In Autumn
- 2007 Ex-Wise Heads: Grounded (exclusive download from Burning Shed)
- 2007 Ex-Wise Heads: Liquid Assets
- 2007 Mirage: Child's Play
- 2008 Ex-Wise Heads: Celestial Disclosure (limited vinyl release)
- 2008 Geoff Leigh / Simon Crab: Track on Antibothis Compilation CD
- 2009 Henry Cow: The 40th Anniversary Henry Cow Box Set
- 2009 Geoff Leigh / Yumi Hara: Upstream
- 2009 Geoff Leigh / Yumi Hara: Riverhead (Limited Edition CD-R)
- 2010 Radar Favourites: Radar Favourites
- 2010 Ex-Wise Heads: Celestial Disclosure (CD version re-release plus bonus track)
- 2010 Stadtfisch: Stadtfischflex
- 2010 X Black Sheep: Out of Quarantine (Digital release)
- 2013 Geoff Leigh / Mark Hewins: Co-Lab (CD-R + digital release)
- 2015 The Artaud Beats: Logos
- 2015 Warrior Squares: Vol.1 (CD-R + digital release)
- 2015 Simon Crab: After America (Guest appearance)
- 2016 Geoff Leigh / Makoto Kawabata: Spatial Roots (CD + digital release)
- 2016 Kontakt Mikrofoon Orkest: KMO Live in Paris 1981 (Digital release)
- 2016 Jump for Joy: Bat Pullover (CD + vinyl)
- 2016 Geoff Leigh + Friends: USA (Digital release of demo from 1991, originally released on cassette)
- 2016 Filippo Paolini aka Økapi: Pardonne-moi Olivier. 16 oiseaux pour Olivier Messiaen (CD + digital release)
- 2017 Geoff Leigh / Makoto Kawabata: Into The Fire (Digital Release)
- 2017 Jump For Joy: Keeping Score (CD)
- 2017 Geoff Leigh / Frank Wuyts: Concert For Two Flies and a Mouse (Digital Release)
- 2018 Geoff Leigh / Makoto Kawabata: Villa K (CD-R + Digital Release)
- 2018 Geoff Leigh / Makoto Kawabata / Aogu Tanimoto: Live at Delsol Cafe (CD + Digital Release)
- 2019 Geoff Leigh – Solo: Sleeping For England (Digital release)
- 2019 Henry Cow: The Henry Cow Box Redux: The Complete Henry Cow
- 2020 Acid Mothers Temple: Chosen Star Child's Confession (Vinyl, CD, Digital Release)
- 2020 Geoff Leigh: RIO Festival, Reims, 1980 (Digital Release)
- 2020 Acid Mothers Temple: Zero Diver or Puroto Guru (Vinyl + Digital Release)
- 2020: Acid Mothers Temple: Reverse Of Rebirth Reprise (Vinyl, Nod and Smile records)
- # Re-released 2005 on MCCB Compilation CD (Ad Hoc Records)
- ## Re-released 2006
