= In Praise of Learning =

Studio album by Henry Cow with Slapp Happy
- Released: 9 May 1975
- Recorded: February–March 1975
- Studios: The Manor, Oxfordshire, England
- Genres: Experimental rock; progressive rock
- Length: 37:28
- Label: Virgin (UK)
- Producers: Henry Cow, Slapp Happy, Phil Becque

Henry Cow chronology
Desperate Straights (1975)	In Praise of Learning (1975)	Concerts (1976)

Slapp Happy chronology
Desperate Straights (1975)	In Praise of Learning (1975)	Acnalbasac Noom (1980)

In Praise of Learning is a studio album by the British avant-rock group Henry Cow, recorded at Virgin Records' Manor studios in February and March 1975, and released in May 1975. On this album, Henry Cow had expanded to include members of Slapp Happy, who had merged with the group after the two collaborated on Desperate Straights in 1974. The merger ended after recording In Praise of Learning, when Peter Blegvad and Anthony Moore of Slapp Happy left the group.

== Content ==
In Praise of Learning was Henry Cow's most overtly political album. Printed on the back of the album cover is filmmaker John Grierson's quote "Art is not a mirror – it is a hammer", and the Tim Hodgkinson composition "Living in the Heart of the Beast" made explicit the band's left-wing political leanings, with Dagmar Krause's powerful voice adding a new dimension to their music. The Moore/Blegvad song "War" was first recorded as "War (Is Energy Enslaved)" (Note: The title of "War (Is Energy Enslaved)" was taken from the line "For war is energy enslaved, but thy religion" in the poem, Vala, or The Four Zoas – Night the Ninth by William Blake.) by Slapp Happy with session musicians in May 1974, but was not released. It was re-recorded during the making of the first Slapp Happy/Henry Cow collaborative album, Desperate Straights, but was held back for release on In Praise of Learning. Moore later rearranged the song for his 1979 solo album, Flying Doesn't Help. "War" was also covered by The Fall on their 1994 album Middle Class Revolt.

"Living in the Heart of the Beast" began as an unfinished instrumental that Hodgkinson presented to the group, which was cut up and performed live in 1974 with improvisational sections added. One such performance, Halsteren, was recorded in Halsteren in September 1974, and appears in Volume 2: 1974–5 of The 40th Anniversary Henry Cow Box Set (2009). After the merger with Slapp Happy, Hodgkinson commissioned Blegvad to write lyrics for the piece for Krause to sing. But after several attempts, Blegvad admitted that he was "out of [his] depth", and Hodgkinson wrote the lyrics himself.

Chris Cutler's lyrics on "Beautiful as the Moon – Terrible as an Army with Banners" were the first he had written; the song was the first product of the partnership between him and Fred Frith that later grew into Art Bears with Krause. The song also became the longest lasting "building block" the band used in subsequent live performances.

== Album and track titles ==
The album's title was taken from "In Praise of Learning", a poem by Bertolt Brecht, which is one of several "In Praise of ..." poems he wrote. (Note: Other poems in this series include, "In Praise of Communism", "In Praise of Doubt", "In Praise of Illegal Work", "In Praise of Study" and "In Praise of the Work of the Party".)

The title of the track "Beautiful as the Moon – Terrible as an Army with Banners" comes from a line in the Bible's Song of Solomon: "Who is she that looketh forth as the morning, fair as the moon, clear as the sun, and terrible as an army with banners?" Writing in Beyond and Before: Progressive Rock Since the 1960s, Paul Hegarty and Martin Halliwell posit that the track titles "Beginning: The Long March" and "Morning Star" refer to Mao Zedong's Long March and the Communist Party of Great Britain newspaper Morning Star respectively.

== Cover art ==
The cover art by artist Ray Smith was the third of three of his "paint socks" to feature on Henry Cow's albums, the first being on Legend (1973).

Smith was not credited on the original LP release of the album. He was not happy with the text on the cover and asked that it be omitted, as was done on Legend's cover. But his request was denied. When he asked to be credited under a pseudonym, that was also denied and his name was left off the credits. He was later credited on the CD releases of the album.

Hegarty and Halliwel suggest that Smith's red sock is "an antidote" to the "extravagant" album cover art work of commercial progressive rock bands.

== Remixes and reissues ==
The album was remixed in 1985 for a vinyl reissue on the band's own Broadcast label. This remix was used in the 1991 East Side Digital Records CD issue, with one extra track, "Lovers of Gold" (an alternate version of "Beginning: The Long March" by Chris Cutler). "Lovers of Gold" includes texts by Cutler and sung by Krause near the beginning; they are printed in the CD liner notes.

In 2000 Recommended Records and East Side Digital issued a remastered version of In Praise of Learning on CD with the original 1975 mix and without the bonus track. The "Lovers of Gold" bonus track would later reappear on the Cow Cabinet of Curiosities disc in The 40th Anniversary Henry Cow Box Set (2009).

== Reception ==
Professional ratings
Review scores
Source	Rating
AllMusic	3.5/5 stars
Christgau's Record Guide	B

A review at AllMusic called In Praise of Learning, the result of Henry Cow and Slapp Happy's brief merger, "stunning" and "bracing", and said "No one has ever, before or since, sounded like this incarnation of Henry Cow". The reviewer described the Moore/Blegvad composition "War" as "enormous [in] proportion and power" that would not have succeeded in the hands of the "relatively quiet trio". Music journalist Robert Christgau described the album's lyrics as "literary if not pompous in print", but said Krause's "abrasively arty, Weill-derived" singing "manage[s] to find a context for [the] words". Christgau complimented Frith's atonal piano, but felt that the musique concrète on side two of the LP was "less than winning".

In another review of the album in Let It Rock, Dave Laing said that Krause's vocals have the same "brittle style" that American singer and songwriter Judy Collins used on Weill's "Pirate Jenny" and the play Marat/Sade. He was impressed with Hodgkinson's "Living in the Heart of the Beast", its "long controlled lyric" and its "determined fermenting movement to its climax". Laing noted, however, that the political themes of the album are damped a little by Blegvad and Moore's "War", which he felt is "musically limp and politically liberal", and by the presence of the two "experimental" instrumentals. But Laing concluded that it is still "an unexpectedly fine album, pointing a way forward for both avant-garde and 'committed' music in Britain".

Reviewing the album in Melody Maker, Steve Lake called In Praise of Learning "the album of the year". He said it is "revolutionary" in the sense that it is both "innovatory" and promoting "a revolution in government". With quotes from Mao Zedong, "no punches [are] pulled ... all the cards are on the table", although Lake did feel that Henry Cow tend to be "over-scholarly" at times. He described the music on the album as "nothing less than staggering", and called "Living in the Heart of the Beast" the LP's "threatening and propulsive" "tour-de-force". Finally, Lake described the instrumental "Beginning: The Long March" as "the finest use made by any rock band of electronics and free form."

Music critic Ian MacDonald wrote in New Musical Express that In Praise of Learning "manages to be simultaneously the group's most extreme and most accessible album so far". He called it "a demonstrative, theatrical, and didactic record" that blends ideology with art. MacDonald described "War" as "downbeat mythologising and exploding musique concrete" that "heaves and thrashes like an octopus caught in a ship's propellor [sic]". "Beautiful as the Moon – Terrible as an Army with Banners" starts off well, but is let down later by pretentious lyrics. "Living in the Heart of the Beast" also begins well, but despite "a remarkable instrumental interlude", it "sinks awkwardly to earth beneath the would-be climactic exhortations of the finale". MacDonald said "In Praise of Learning is, like all efforts by compulsive perfectionists, imperfect – but aimed high". He praised the group for their "risk-taking" and added that "we should be thankful for the ... commitment that leads a group like Henry Cow to pursue so single-mindedly the limits of the feasible in our music".

== Track listing ==
Side one
No.	Title	Writer(s)	Length
1.	"War"	Anthony Moore, Peter Blegvad	2:25
2.	"Living in the Heart of the Beast"	Tim Hodgkinson	15:30

Side two
No.	Title	Writer(s)	Length
3.	"Beginning: The Long March"	Henry Cow, Slapp Happy	6:26
4.	"Beautiful as the Moon – Terrible as an Army with Banners"	Fred Frith, Chris Cutler	7:02
5.	"Morning Star"	Henry Cow, Slapp Happy	6:05

1991 CD re-issue bonus tracks
No.	Title	Writer(s)	Length
6.	"Lovers of Gold"	Henry Cow, Slapp Happy, Cutler	6:28

== Personnel ==
Henry Cow

- Tim Hodgkinson – Farfisa organ, clarinet, piano
- Fred Frith – guitar, violin, xylophone, piano
- John Greaves – bass guitar, piano
- Lindsay Cooper – bassoon, oboe
- Chris Cutler – drums, radio

Slapp Happy

- Dagmar Krause (credited as "Dagmar") – vocals
- Peter Blegvad – guitar (track 2, 3), vocals (track 1), clarinet (track 1)
- Anthony Moore – piano (tracks 1, 2), electronics, "tapework"

Additional musicians

- Geoff Leigh – soprano saxophone (track 1)
- Mongezi Feza – trumpet (track 1)
- Phil Becque – oscillator (track 4)

Production

- Simon Heyworth – engineer (track 1)
- Henry Cow – producer
- Slapp Happy – producer
- Phil Becque – producer
- Ray Smith – cover art
- Matt Murman – remastered 2000 CD reissue

== See also ==
- The Virgin Years – Souvenir Box (1991)
- Henry Cow Box (2006)

== Works cited ==
- Cutler, Chris, ed. (2009). "The Road: Volumes 1–5". The 40th Anniversary Henry Cow Box Set (box set booklet). Henry Cow. London: Recommended Records.
- Cutler, Chris, ed. (2019). "Book 1 | The Studio: Official Releases". The Henry Cow Box Redux: The Complete Henry Cow (box set booklet). Henry Cow. London: Recommended Records.
- Hegarty, Paul; Halliwell, Martin (2011). Beyond and Before: Progressive Rock Since the 1960s. London: Bloomsbury Publishing. ISBN 978-1-4411-1480-8.
- Piekut, Benjamin (2019). Henry Cow: The World Is a Problem. Duke University Press. ISBN 978-1-47800-405-9.
