= Ça Va =

Studio album by Slapp Happy
- Released: April 1998
- Recorded: June–August 1997
- Studio: Helicon Mountain, Westcombe Park, London
- Genre: Avant-rock; avant-pop
- Length: 47:07
- Label: V2 (UK)
- Producer: Laurie Latham

Slapp Happy chronology
Acnalbasac Noom (1980)	Ça Va (1998)	Live in Japan (2001)

Ça Va (/sɑː vɑː/; French for "okay", literally "that goes") is a studio album by German/British avant-pop trio Slapp Happy, featuring Anthony Moore, Peter Blegvad and Dagmar Krause. It was recorded in London in 1997 and released by V2 Records in April 1998. The Japanese release of the album included a bonus track, "Hello Dagi". It was Slapp Happy's first album in 23 years.

== Background ==
Blegvad said Geoff Travis of Rough Trade Records had been trying to pursued Slapp Happy to reform. He asked Blegvad what it would cost to make another album, and Blegvad gave him a figure of £20,000. When Travis produced the money, work on the album began. Unlike the trio's previous albums, which were recorded with backing groups Faust and Henry Cow, on Ça Va they played all the instruments themselves, and used a digital studio to produce a layered sound on many of the tracks.

Blegvad remarked that making Ça Va "was a great experience". He said that unlike their previous albums, here "we emphasized the pop element of the music". But Blegvad added that, as on their earlier albums, the songs still have "some kind of twist in the tail ... That's always been our way".

== Reception ==
Professional ratings
Review scores
Source	Rating
AllMusic	4.5/5 stars

In a review at AllMusic, Dave Lynch wrote that in contrast to Slapp Happy's 1970s "twisted" British folk-pop, avant cabaret and art rock (with Henry Cow), on Ça Va they play "a more commercial blend of pop music sounds". But he added that this "does not detract from the album's artistry", and the trio "has rarely sounded better". Lynch stated that the album "is a fine example of pop songcraft – intelligent, literate, and wry", with hints of psychedelic pop, but "always employed as a bit of sonic flavor and never overindulgent".

British music journalist Chris Nickson wrote in CMJ New Music Monthly that Ça Va is "sweet subversion". He said it is deceptively "lush and friendly", but underneath "the lyrics are little razor blades, just waiting to cut you". Nickson described the album as "pure, sophisticated pop for intelligent people." Reviewing the album in The Village Voice, American film and music critic Glenn Kenny called Ça Va a "wonderful album filled with moving, insinuating, and genuinely beautiful songs". He remarked that while the songs are not quite the "eccentric" Moore/Blegvad compositions from their earlier work, and Blegvad and Moore are not collaborating as much as they used to, "the way they play together makes this a 'real' Slapp Happy record". Kenny said the sound is "deceptively slick", and "it's the 'subdued' Krause who defines, or scars, these varied pop songs".

== Track listing ==
No.	Title	Writer(s)	Length
1.	"Scarred for Life"	Blegvad	3:19
2.	"Moon Lovers"	Krause/Latham	3:00
3.	"Child Then"	Blegvad/Partridge	4:18
4.	"Is it You?"	Krause/Moore	5:06
5.	"King of Straw"	Blegvad/Gregson	3:14
6.	"Powerful Stuff"	Blegvad/Moore	4:14
7.	"A Different Lie"	Moore	4:06
8.	"Coralie"	Moore	3:53
9.	"Silent the Voice"	Krause/Moore	4:05
10.	"Working at the Ministry"	Moore	4:54
11.	"The Unborn Byron"	Blegvad/Moore	3:17
12.	"Let's Travel Light"	Blegvad	3:41

Bonus track on 1998 V2 Japan release
No.	Title	Writer(s)	Length
13.	"Hello Dagi"	Blegvad/Moore	4:51

== Personnel ==
- Anthony Moore – keyboards, programming, guitars, saz (bağlama), toy theremin, percussion, melodica, vocals (lead on "Coralie")
- Peter Blegvad – guitars, bass, percussion, vocals (lead on "Powerful Stuff")
- Dagmar Krause – vocals, piano ("Is it You?")

=== Sound and art work ===
- Laurie Latham – producer
- Peter Blegvad – cover art work
