= Acnalbasac Noom =

Studio album by Slapp Happy
- Released: 1980
- Recorded: 1973, Wümme, Bremen, Germany
- Genre: Art rock・art pop
- Length: 34:57
- Language: English
- Label: Recommended (UK)
- Producer: Uwe Nettelbeck

Slapp Happy chronology
In Praise of Learning (1975)	Acnalbasac Noom (1980)	Ça Va (1998)

Professional ratings
Review scores
Source	Rating
AllMusic	4/5 stars

Acnalbasac Noom (also known as Slapp Happy or Slapphappy) is a studio album by German-British avant-pop group Slapp Happy, recorded in Wümme, Bremen, Germany in 1973 with Faust as their backing band. It had a working title of Casablanca Moon but was never released at the time because it had been rejected by their record label, Polydor. Slapp Happy later re-recorded the album in 1974 for Virgin Records, who released it in 1974 as Slapp Happy. The original 1973 recording of Casablanca Moon, was released as Slapp Happy or Slapphappy by Recommended Records in 1980, and reissued as Acnalbasac Noom in 1982. The title Acnalbasac Noom appears in the lyrics of the song "Casablanca Moon", and is Casablanca Moon with the words written backwards.

The track titles on Acnalbasac Noom are identical to those on Slapp Happy, except for the track sequence, and that "Haiku" on Slapp Happy is replaced by "Charlie 'n Charlie" on Acnalbasac Noom. An instrumental version of "Charlie 'n Charlie" had been released as the title tune of Slapp Happy's first album, Sort Of. Musically, Acnalbasac Noom is arranged quite differently from Slapp Happy: it has a raw and unsophisticated "rock" feel about it, whereas Slapp Happy tends to be more sentimental and "dreamy" with complex arrangements, including a string orchestra. While the unsophisticated feel of Acnalbasac Noom still appeals to many fans, it was the sentimental sound on Slapp Happy that the band became best known for.

== Track listing ==
All music composed by Anthony Moore and Peter Blegvad, except where noted.

Side one
No.	Title	Writer(s)	Length
1.	"Casablanca Moon"		2:57
2.	"Me and Parvati"		3:25
3.	"Mr. Rainbow"	Blegvad	3:45
4.	"Michelangelo"		2:34
5.	"The Drum"		3:45
6.	"A Little Something"	Blegvad	3:15

Side two
No.	Title	Writer(s)	Length
7.	"The Secret"		3:20
8.	"Dawn"		3:30
9.	"Half-Way There"	Blegvad	3:02
10.	"Charlie 'n Charlie"		2:18
11.	"Slow Moon's Rose"	Moore	3:06

== Personnel ==
- Anthony Moore – keyboards, guitar
- Peter Blegvad – guitar, vocals
- Dagmar Krause – vocals

=== Guests (Faust) ===
- Jean-Hervé Péron – bass guitar
- Werner "Zappi" Diermaier – drums
- Gunther Wüsthoff – saxophone

=== Sound and art work ===
- Uwe Nettelbeck – producer
- Kurt Graupner – engineer
- Peter Blegvad – cover art work

== CD reissues ==
In 1990 Recommended Records reissued Acnalbasac Noom on CD with four extra tracks:

- "Everybody's Slimmin' (Even Men and Women)" (Moore/Blegvad) – 4:07
- "Blue Eyed William (demo)" (Blegvad) – 3:32
- "Karen (demo)" (Blegvad) – 3:16
- "Messages" (Krause) – 2:07

In 2000 Recommended Records issued a remastered (by Bob Drake) edition with the same artwork and tracks. The same remaster was also issued as a Japanese mini-LP sleeve with the original LP artwork.
