= Alain de Halleux =

Belgian film director, producer, photographer and screenwriter

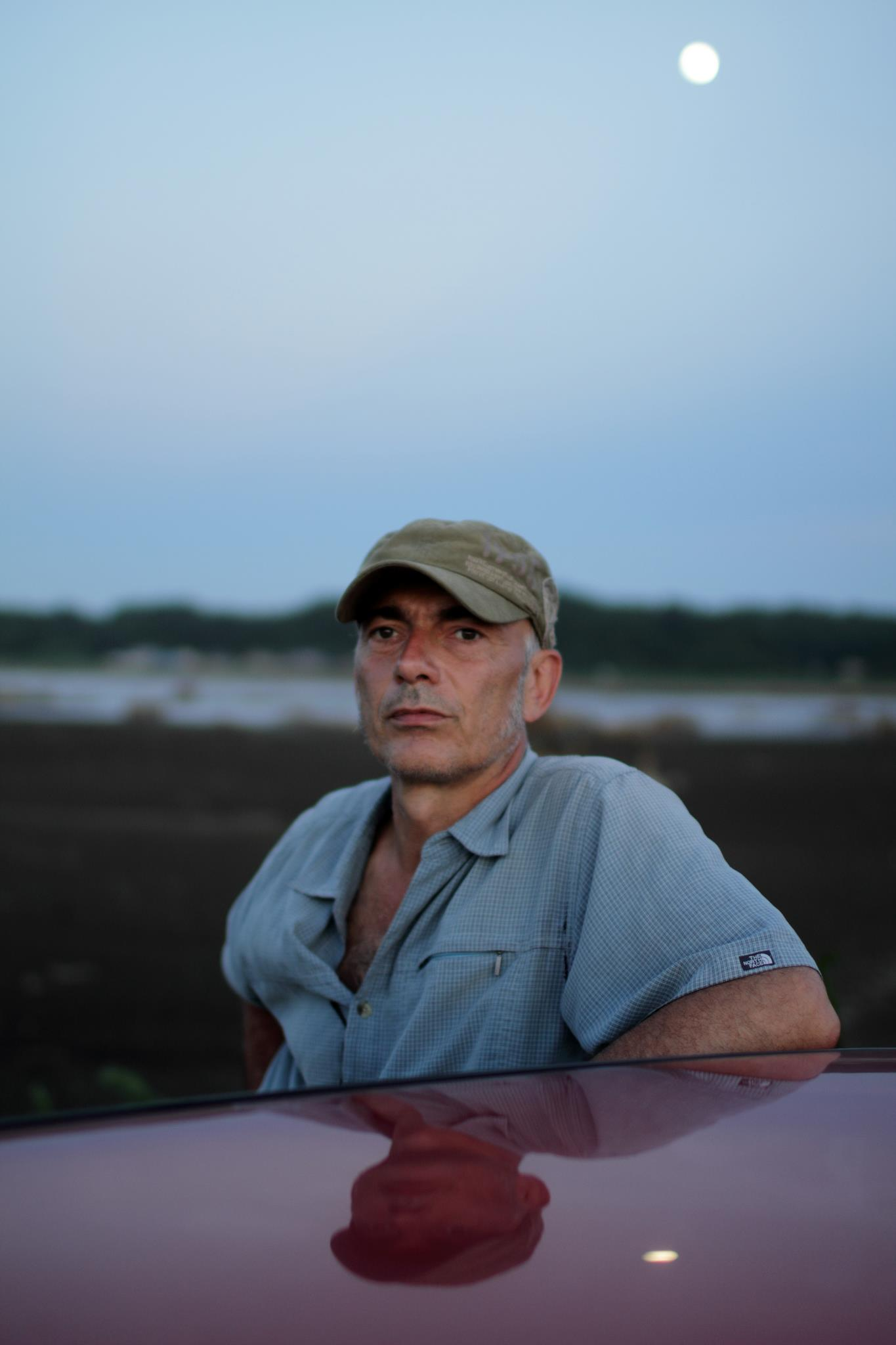
- Born: 21 October 1957 (age 69); Brussels, Belgium
- Education: UCLouvain (BSc) INSAS – Institut national supérieur des arts du spectacle et des techniques de diffusion (BA)
- Occupations: Film director, screenwriter, film producer, author
- Years active: 1991–present
- Website: alaindehalleux.com

Alain de Halleux (born 21 October 1957) is a Belgian film director, producer, photographer and screenwriter. His films predominantly focus on the topics of environmental, social, financial, economic and political issues such as Brexit.

== Early life and career ==
Alain de Halleux was born on October 21, 1957, in Brussels, Belgium. He received a bachelor's degree in Chemical Sciences (Nuclear) at Université catholique de Louvain in 1978. During his studies at UCLouvain he viewed Andrei Arsenyevich Tarkovsky ’s Mirror, which inspired him to study cinema. de Halleux went on to study cinema at l’INSAS, Institut National Supérieur des Arts du Spectacle et des Techniques de Diffusion. During his time there he studied the work of Kurosawa such as Dreams and Seven Samurai. After obtaining an INSAS qualification in film directing de Halleux created his film production company Indian Production, choosing the name to honor indigenous peoples’ respect for nature and the Earth.

de Halleux has worked in photojournalism and on his return to Paris from a work related trip he met documentary filmmaker Raymond Depardon. He has cited this meeting as having a great impact on his work.

== Filmmaking ==
Alain de Halleux started his film career working on fiction, later choosing to focus on documentary filmmaking. His 2000 film Pleure pas Germaine (Don't Cry Germaine), a feature-length film about a family of Spanish migrants returning to their country, screened at the Festroia International Film Festival.

=== Documentary films ===
de Halleux's documentary film work predominantly focuses on environmental, social, financial, economic and political issues. His 2008 film, R.A.S nucléaire rien à signaler, looked at the effects of outsourcing nuclear plant maintenance on our safety since the privatisation of the electricity markets and was the first in a series of documentaries about nuclear power. Initially released to little fanfare, the film received wider attention when it screened on the Franco-German network Arte.

He went on to direct Chernobyl 4 ever in 2011, in response to his realisation that the post-nuclear disaster situation was far more complex than it appeared. During a screening of the film at the European Parliament de Halleux met a young Japanese researcher who was struggling to save his hometown after the Fukushima Daiichi nuclear disaster. His entreaty for de Halleux to make a documentary film led to the creation of the short film Les Recits de Fukushima (Stories from Fukushima), which released in October 2011. de Halleux continued filming and completed an expanded version in March 2013, Welcome to Fukushima. It premiered at the European Parliament on the second anniversary of the Fukushima nuclear disaster. During the making of Welcome to Fukushima, de Halleux met Tarō Yamamoto, a former actor and surfer turned politician. de Halleux would go on to follow Yamamoto from 2013 until 2018, forming the 2018 documentary Beyond the Waves. The film focuses on Yamamoto's experiences as a member of the House of Councillors as well as Contemporary Politics, nationalism, xenophobia and rearmament in Japan.

de Halleux went on to release La Faute A Personne (No One to Blame) in 2016, a documentary film about the various significant events that led to the collapse of DEXIA bank after the financial crisis. In 2019, de Halleux released The Clock Is Ticking. The film follows Michel Barnier, the chief EU negotiator of Brexit, tracing the various stages of the discussions that led to the agreement, still awaiting ratification, on the withdrawal of the UK from the European Union.

== Filmography ==
Year	Film	Producers
2023	Vers l’Europe, loin de Moscou (90')	(Vimeo)
2021	Bienvenue chez les SOCCS (80')	(ARTE, RTBF)
2021	Le grain de sable dans la machine (90')	(ARTE, RTBF)
2019	The Clock Is Ticking (90')	(ARTE, RTBF, VRT, NHK and many others TV channels)
2018	Beyond the Waves (60')	(RTBF, VRT, various cinema in Japan)
2016	La Faute A Personne (52')	(France 5, RTBF)
2013	Welcome to Fukushima (60')	(RTBF, VRT)
2011	Les Recits de Fukushima (8x8')	(Arte)
2010	Chernobyl 4 ever (60')	(ARTE, RTBF, VRT, NHK...)
2008	R.A.S (60')	(ARTE, RTBF, VRT)
2006	Ou tu vas DOCUMENTAIRE DE (40')	(ULB)
2004	Anishnabe (26’)	DOCU POUR (ARTE)
2003	Barrieres (6')	(RTBF)
2000	Pleure pas Germaine (96')	(Oberón Cinematográfica, RTBF, Stupid Studio, Tchin Tchin Productions, YC Alligator Film)
1998	La trace (60’)	DOCUMENTAIRE RTBF/VRT
1995	Fanny se fait un sang d' encre (90’)	FEATURE RTBF/FR2°
1991	Ces droles de belges avec leurs droles de films (52’)	
