= Anthony Moore =

British musician (born 1948)

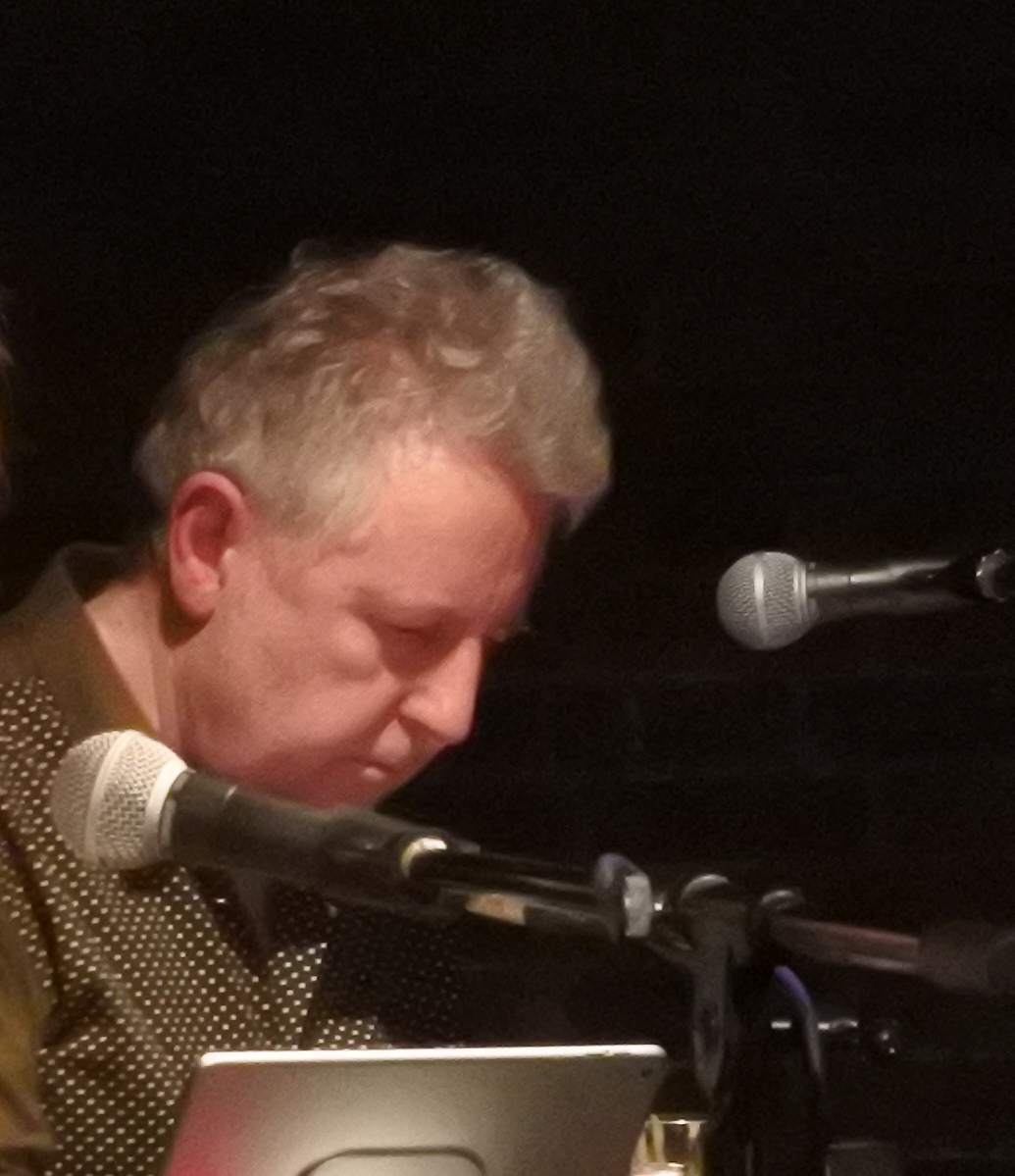
- Moore performing in 2017

Background information
- Also known as: Anthony More; A. More
- Born: 13 August 1948 (age 78); London, England
- Genres: Progressive rock; experimental music
- Occupations: Musician; composer
- Instruments: Guitar; keyboards; synthesizer; sequencer; vocals
- Years active: 1970–present
- Labels: Polydor; Virgin; Parlophone; Table of the Elements
- Website: reflectionsonsound.com halfcatmusic.com

Anthony Moore (also known as Anthony More (Note: Anthony Moore credited himself as "Anthony More" on all his solo albums from Flying Doesn't Help (1979) onwards.)) (born 13 August 1948) is a British experimental music composer, performer and producer. He was a founding member of the band Slapp Happy, worked with Henry Cow and has made a number of solo albums, including Flying Doesn't Help (1979) and World Service (1981).

As a lyricist, Moore has collaborated with Pink Floyd on two of their albums: A Momentary Lapse of Reason (1987) and The Division Bell (1994), and contributed music to the instrumental "Calling" from The Endless River (2014). He contributed lyrics to Richard Wright's Broken China (1996), worked with Kevin Ayers on various projects and also contributed lyrics to Trevor Rabin's Can't Look Away (1989) and Julian Lennon's Help Yourself (1991).

For a fuller list of works and more recent activity since 2010 to date see halfcatmusic.com

== Biography ==
Anthony Moore's musical career began when he met Peter Blegvad, while both were students at St Christopher School, Letchworth. They played in various bands, including Slapp Happy (the name was a reference to Blegvad's then-girlfriend) and the Dum-Dums. After school Moore studied Indian classical music with Viram Jasani in 1969, and went on to compose his first film soundtrack for David Larcher's Mare's Tale.

In 1971 Moore moved to Hamburg, Germany and worked in Hamburg's experimental music scene, recording two minimalist albums for Polydor Germany. In 1972 Blegvad visited Moore in Hamburg and, along with Moore's girlfriend (and soon to be wife) Dagmar Krause, Moore (guitar, keyboards), Blegvad (guitar) and Krause (vocals) formed the avant-pop trio, Slapp Happy. Moore and Blegvad composed the band's music.

Slapp Happy recorded two albums for Polydor Germany with krautrock group Faust as their backing band. Polydor released the first, Sort Of in 1972, but rejected the second, Casablanca Moon. This rejection prompted Slapp Happy to relocate to London where they signed up with Virgin Records and re-recorded Casablanca Moon, released in 1974 by Virgin as Slapp Happy. (The original Casablanca Moon was later released by Recommended Records as Acnalbasac Noom in 1980.) In 1974 Slapp Happy merged briefly with avant-rock group Henry Cow, recording two albums in 1975, Desperate Straights and In Praise of Learning. However soon after recording the second album, first Moore, then Blegvad left the amalgamation on account of incompatibilities with the group. Blegvad remarked that the "chords and the time signatures were too complicated." But Krause elected to remain with Henry Cow and that spelt the end of Slapp Happy.

Moore and Blegvad parted company at this point, but participated in brief Slapp Happy reunions in 1982, 1997, 2000 and 2016–2017. Moore, Blegvad and Krause also collaborated in 1991 on the specially commissioned opera 'Camera', which was made by the production company After Image and was broadcast two years later on Channel 4 in the United Kingdom.

After leaving Henry Cow/Slapp Happy, Moore relaunched his solo career in 1977 by releasing Out on Virgin Records, with backing by Kevin Ayers and Andy Summers. Out, however, was not commercial enough for Virgin, and they cancelled Moore's contract. In 1979 and 1981 Moore recorded Flying Doesn't Help and World Service, respectively on independent labels. Both albums were well received. The song "World Service", inspired by the BBC World Service, was released as a single and combines shortwave radio with heavy dance beats.

Moore has worked in various European locations as a freelance composer, writing songs and film scores. He produced a number of albums, including This Heat's debut album, Angel Station by Manfred Mann's Earth Band (in conjunction with Mann who later covered his song "World Service"). Moore also collaborated with Pink Floyd on three of their albums.

In 1996 Moore was appointed professor for research into sound and music in the context of new media at the Academy of Media Arts in Cologne, Germany. From 2000 to 2004 he was the principal of the Academy of Media Arts. Moore has also travelled to many European locations, presenting lectures on sound and music.

In 2002 Moore formed a music trio with Jörg Lindenmaier and Peter C. Simon called LMS, named after the first letters of their surnames. They performed in France and Germany between 2002 and 2003.

Krause, Moore and Blegvad reformed Slapp Happy in November 2016 to perform with Faust at the Week-End festival in Cologne, Germany. The two groups also played together on 10–11 February 2017 at Cafe Oto in London. On 24 February 2017 Slapp Happy, without Faust, performed at Mt. Rainier Hall, Shibuya in Tokyo.

== Discography ==
=== Bands and projects ===
With Slapp Happy

- Sort Of (1972, LP, Polydor Records)
- Slapp Happy (also known as Casablanca Moon) (1974, LP, Virgin Records)
- Slapp Happy or Slapphappy (1980, LP, Recommended Records)
- Ça Va (1998, CD, V2 Records)
- Live in Japan (2001, CD, FMN Records)

With Slapp Happy and Henry Cow

- Desperate Straights (1974, LP, Virgin Records)
- In Praise of Learning (1975, LP, Virgin Records)
- The 40th Anniversary Henry Cow Box Set (2009, 9xCD+DVD, Recommended Records, UK)
- The Henry Cow Box Redux: The Complete Henry Cow (2019, 17xCD+DVD, Recommended Records, UK)

With Peter Blegvad and Dagmar Krause

- Camera (2000, CD, Blueprint Records)

=== Solo ===
Albums

- Pieces from the Cloudland Ballroom (1971, LP, Polydor Records)
- Reed Whistle and Sticks (1972, LP, Polydor Records)
- Secrets of the Blue Bag (1972, LP, Polydor Records)
- Out (1976, LP, Virgin Records)
- Flying Doesn't Help (1979, LP, Quango)
- World Service (1981, LP, Do It Records)
- The Only Choice (1984, LP, Parlophone)
- Arithmetic in the Dark (2019, Download LP, Touch Music)

Singles

- "Johnny's Dead" / "Mr.Rainbow" (1975, 7", Virgin Records)
- "Catch a Falling Star" / "Back to the Top" (1976, 7", Virgin Records)
- "World Service" / "Diving Girl" (1981, 7", Do It Records, DUN 16)
