= Robert Haumer =

Austrian musician (1949–2021)

- Also known as: Bobby Hammer
- Born: 12 May 1949; Vienna, Austria
- Died: 25 June 2021 (aged 72); Austria
- Genres: Prog rock, new wave
- Instrument(s): Bass, guitar
- Formerly of: Zakarrias

Robert Haumer (12 May 1949 – 25 June 2021) was an Austrian musician, who was briefly the leader of early prog rock band Zakarrias, and was sometimes known professionally as Bobby Hammer.

== Life and career ==
Haumer was born in Vienna, and in the late 1960s played bass in local psychedelic rock band Expiration, who released a single, "It Wasn't Right", on the VRC label. He then moved to Munich, where he met English drummer John Lingwood and, through him, guitarist Huw Lloyd-Langton who had recently left Hawkwind. Together they formed the band Salt, and were managed by Israeli poet and singer Samy Birnbach. The band rehearsed together for several months in Munich, performing songs co-written by Haumer and Birnbach, before moving to London where they recorded an album of demos at Olympic Studios. However, they could not gain a record deal as neither Haumer nor Birnbach had work permits.

After Lloyd-Langton and Lingwood left, Haumer met producer Roger Watson, and succeeded in winning a solo recording deal with Deram Records. He re-recorded his material under the name Zakarrias, with a hastily formed band comprising Peter Robinson (keyboards, formerly of Quatermass), Geoff Leigh (saxophone, flute), and Martin Harrison (drums). The album was recorded with Watson at Decca Studios, with some arrangements by Don Gould, formerly of The Applejacks. The LP, Zakarrias, was issued by Deram in October 1971 and featured a sleeve photo by Daniel Volpeliere-Pièrrot. However, it was commercially unsuccessful, and relatively few copies were made, resulting in the album later becoming a collector's item.

Remaining unable to obtain a work permit and so promote the record, Haumer and his wife returned to live in Switzerland. He later formed the Bobby Hammer Band (BHB), who recorded new wave material in Vienna in the early 1980s, and as a solo performer released a version of "Papa Was a Rolling Stone" in 1987. The album Zakarrias was later issued on CD on several occasions.

Haumer died in Austria in 2021, aged 72.
