= The Manor Studio =

Recording studio in Oxfordshire, England

Coordinates: 51°50′44″N 1°18′18″W

The Manor Studio (a.k.a. the Manor) was a recording studio in the outbuildings of the manor house in the village of Shipton-on-Cherwell in Oxfordshire, England, north of the city of Oxford. Established in 1971 by Virgin Records founder Richard Branson, the Manor was the second residential recording studio in the United Kingdom, the first being Rockfield Studios in Monmouthshire, Wales, established in 1964. The studio served as the location for numerous notable recordings in the 1970s and 80s by artists including Mike Oldfield, Tangerine Dream, Black Sabbath, Public Image Ltd, and XTC.

== Shipton Manor background ==
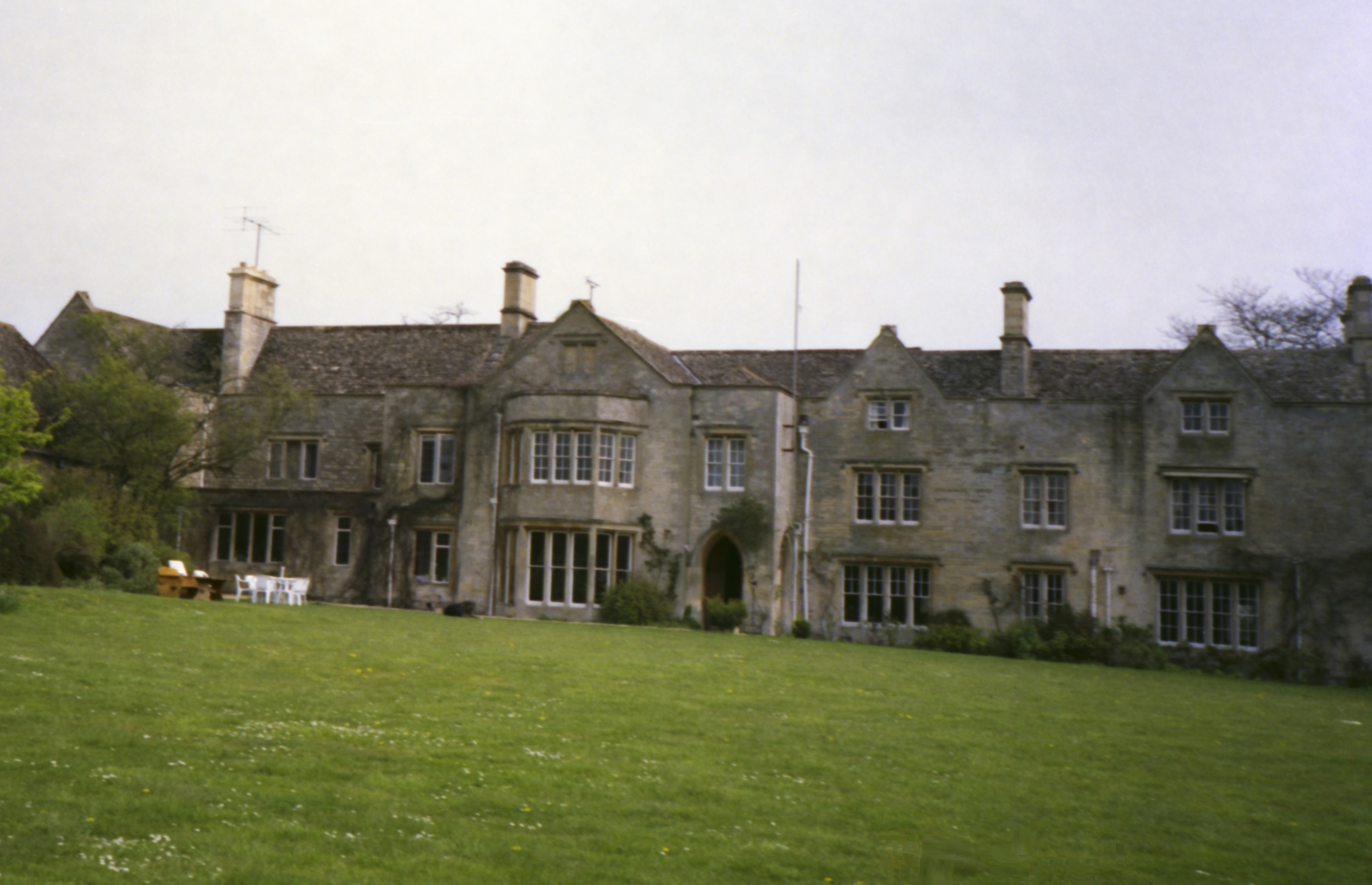
Manor house, April 1990

The manor house that would eventually house the recording studio was built by the Standard family in the 1700s. In 1804, watercolorist William Turner bought the property, remodeling and extending the house and creating a park around it around 1830. In 1867, the manor and park were purchased by the Blenheim estate, and sold to Frank Gray in 1920, who extended the kitchen wing and used the manor for the rehabilitation of young tramps. In 1951, the Manor and its outbuildings were listed as Grade II on the National Heritage List for England. In 1971, Richard Branson purchased the 35-acre estate and renovated the manor.

== Recording studio ==
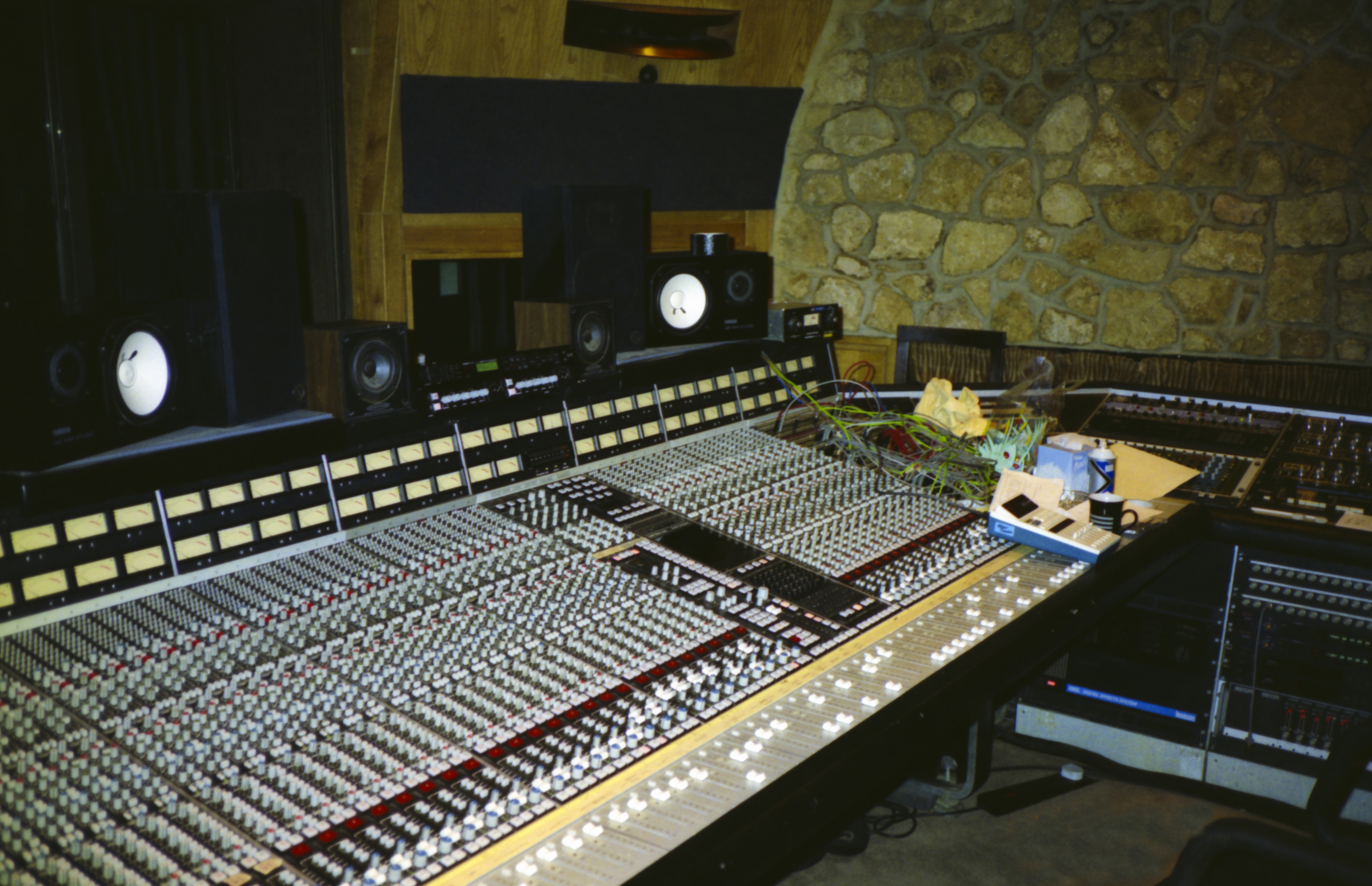
The Manor Studios control room in 1990

An outbuilding on the property that was originally a coach house and later a squash court was converted into a recording studio, with Tom Newman and Simon Heyworth assisting in its construction. The first officially released album to be recorded there, while the studio was still being given its finishing touches in late 1971, was Let's Make Up And Be Friendly, a farewell reunion album by members of the Bonzo Dog Band. Around the same time, Mike Oldfield attended recording sessions at the studio as a bassist for the Arthur Lois Band. Newman and Heyworth heard some of Oldfield's demos and took them to Branson and Simon Draper, who eventually gave Oldfield one week of recording time at The Manor.

In November 1972 Oldfield recorded "Tubular Bells, Part One" at the studio. Approving of the finished product, Branson and Draper gave Oldfield permission to continue recording at the studio to complete the project, and Oldfield recorded "Tubular Bells, Part Two" between February and April 1973. Vivian Stanshall, formerly of the Bonzo Dog Band, was recording his first solo album there immediately afterwards, which led to his guest role as Master of Ceremonies on Tubular Bells. Branson and Draper chose to form their own label, Virgin Records, and use Tubular Bells as the label's first release.

The Manor was a residential studio, providing living accommodations for clients. A 1973 advertisement boasted such amenities as day and night recording, resident cooks, free food and beds, and room for producers, musician's partners, and roadies. The studio featured a 16-track Ampex recorder, 20-channel mixing console, equalization, Dolby noise reduction, quadrophonic monitoring, phasing and echo facilities, a grand piano, and room for up to 40 musicians.

Recording engineer Mick Glossop began working at the studio in 1973. Other artists recording at the Manor in its early years included Sandy Denny, John Cale, Tangerine Dream, and the Strawbs. In 1975 the studio underwent a year-long refurbishment by Tom Hidley and Eastlake Audio, which expanded its capabilities to 24 tracks (to match the Manor Mobile remote recording truck), and included the construction of a new control room and the installation of a quad-ready 32-input Helios mixing console with Allison automation. That year, Queen began recording A Day at the Races at the studio. Other artists recording at the Manor in the 1970s included Van Morrison, XTC, Split Enz, and Public Image Ltd.

In late 1981 the Helios console was replaced by a Solid State Logic SL 4000 E Series. Artists recording at the Manor in the 1980s included Japan, Big Country, INXS, Rush, The Cult, Gene Loves Jezebel.

In April 1995, after the takeover of Virgin Records by EMI, the Manor Studio was closed and the property sold for £750,000 to the Marquess of Headfort as a country home. In 2010, the property was listed for sale for £5.75 million.

== Partial list of albums recorded at the Manor ==
- Dancing Shoes by B.B. Seaton, recorded with Skin, Flesh and Bones band and Soul Syndicate at Joseph Hoo Kim's Channel One Studios then overdubbed at The Manor Studio and Chalk Farm Studios.
- Let's Make Up and Be Friendly (1971–72) – The Bonzo Dog Band – the first band to use the studio, in November 1971
- Rock On (December 1971) – The Bunch featuring Sandy Denny, Richard Thompson, Trevor Lucas and others.
- Sandy (1972) – Sandy Denny
- Trouble at Mill (March 1972) – King Earl Boogie Band
- Two Weeks Last Summer (April 1972) – Dave Cousins
- The Academy in Peril (1972) – John Cale
- Mekanïk Destruktïw Kommandöh (1972–73) – Magma
- Flying Teapot (1972–73) – Gong
- Tubular Bells (September 1972 – March 1973) – Mike Oldfield
- Men Opening Umbrellas Ahead (1973) – Vivian Stanshall
- Double Diamond (1973) – If
- Legend (May 1973) – Henry Cow
- Castle in Spain (June 1973) – CCC Inc.
- Faust IV (June 1973) – Faust
- Spring Suite (July 1973) – McKendree Spring
- October (1973) – Claire Hamill
- Phaedra (December 1973) – Tangerine Dream
- Dandruff (1974) – Ivor Cutler
- You (1974) – Gong
- Unrest (February–March 1974) – Henry Cow
- Blame It on the Night (1974) – Kevin Coyne
- Ghosts (July–September 1974) – Strawbs
- Slapp Happy (1974) – Slapp Happy
- Desperate Straights (1975) – Slapp Happy/Henry Cow
- In Praise of Learning (1975) – Henry Cow/Slapp Happy
- Fine Old Tom (1975) – Tom Newman
- Ommadawn (1975) – Mike Oldfield, sessions with Jabula
- Local Lads Make Good (1975) – Supercharge
- Rubycon (1975) – Tangerine Dream
- Ricochet (1975) – Tangerine Dream
- Deep Cuts (spring–summer 1976) – Strawbs
- Bloodletting (1976) – Boxer
- A Day at the Races (1976) – Queen – backing tracks
- A Period of Transition (1976) – Van Morrison
- White Music (October 1977) – XTC
- Wavelength (1978) – Van Morrison
- Manorisms (1978) – Wet Willie
- Gene Simmons (April 1978) – Gene Simmons
- Una donna per amico (1978) - Lucio Battisti
- Frenzy (November–December 1978) – Split Enz
- Metal Box (March 1979, two tracks) – Public Image Ltd
- Present Tense (July–August 1979) – Shoes
- Metro Music (August 1979) – Martha and the Muffins
- Black Sea (July 1980) – XTC
- The Flowers of Romance (October 1980) – Public Image Ltd
- Strada facendo (1980–81) – Claudio Baglioni
- Architecture & Morality (1980–81) – Orchestral Manoeuvres in the Dark
- The Nature of the Beast (1981) – April Wine
- Tin Drum - Japan
- La Folie (July–September 1981) – The Stranglers
- English Settlement (October–November 1981) – XTC
- All Fall Down (March 1982) – The Sound
- Mummer (September–December 1982) – XTC
- Pounding System -- Ambience in Dub ( 1982) - Dub Syndicate
- Staggering Heights ( 1983 ) - Singers and Players
- The Crossing (1983) – Big Country
- Head First (January–March 1983) – Uriah Heep
- Born Again (mid-1983) – Black Sabbath
- All the Rage – General Public
- The Swing (1984) – INXS
- La vita è adesso (1985) – Claudio Baglioni
- Power Windows (1985) – Rush
- Peace (Summer 1986) – The Cult
- Gone to Earth (September 1986) – David Sylvian
- Wild in the Streets (1987) – Helix
- Hold Your Fire (1987) – Rush
- The House of Dolls (1987) - Gene Loves Jezebel
- The Mission (Autumn 1987) – The Mission UK
- All About Eve (Summer 1987) – All About Eve
- Once Around the World (1987) – It Bites
- Thunder and Consolation (1988) – New Model Army
- Trash the Planet (1989) – Spy vs Spy
- Wish (September 1991 – February 1992) – The Cure
- The Ethereal Mirror (1993) – Cathedral
- Gold Against the Soul (1993) – Manic Street Preachers
- Wild Wood (1993) – Paul Weller
- Grand Prix (September–October 1994) – Teenage Fanclub
- Carnival of Light (1994) – Ride
- No Need to Argue (1994) – The Cranberries
- The Bends (1995) – Radiohead
- Stanley Road (1995) – Paul Weller
- All Change (1995) – Cast – the last band to record at the studio

== The Manor Mobile ==
In 1973, former Pye Studios engineer Philip Newell was working at the Manor and wanted to build a mobile recording truck. Branson offered to build a state-of-the-art 24-track mobile recording truck. The Manor Mobile went into operation on 30 July, and found immediate success with bookings from Virgin Records artists, other record labels, and the BBC.
