= Slaphappy: Pride, Prejudice, and Professional Wrestling =

2006 book by Thomas C. Hackett

- Author: Thomas Hackett
- Language: English
- Genre: Non-fiction
- Publisher: HarperCollins
- Publication date: 2006
- Publication place: United States
- ISBN: 0-06-019829-X
- OCLC: 61178232
- Dewey Decimal: 796.812 22
- LC Class: GV1195 .H23 2006

Slaphappy: Pride, Prejudice, and Professional Wrestling is a book written by reporter Thomas Hackett that describes, with a sociological and philosophical bent, the industry of professional wrestling.

== Reception ==
The New York Times gave the book a mediocre review. Kirkus Reviews said the book is a "punch-drunk saga of showbiz ugliness". Publishers Weekly called the title a "fascinating study".

== Sources ==
- Hackett, Thomas. Slaphappy: Pride, Prejudice, and Professional wrestling. Harper Collins. New York, NY. 2006.
