= Desperate Straights =

Studio album by Slapp Happy with Henry Cow
- Released: 21 February 1975
- Recorded: 11–26 November 1974
- Studios: The Manor, Oxfordshire, England: Nova Sound Studios, London
- Genres: Avant-rock, art pop, cabaret
- Length: 36:02
- Label: Virgin (UK)
- Producers: Slapp Happy, Henry Cow, Simon Heyworth

Slapp Happy chronology
Slapp Happy (1974)	Desperate Straights (1975)	In Praise of Learning (1975)

Henry Cow chronology
Unrest (1974)	Desperate Straights (1975)	In Praise of Learning (1975)

Desperate Straights is a collaborative studio album by British avant-rock groups Slapp Happy and Henry Cow. It was recorded at Virgin Records' Manor Studio and Nova Sound Studios in November 1974, and released in February 1975. It was Slapp Happy's second album for Virgin, and they had invited Henry Cow to record with them.

== Content ==
The album is a blend of Henry Cow's avant-garde music and Slapp Happy's nostalgic pop, and the success of this collaboration led to the two bands merging and recording In Praise of Learning in 1975. "Europa" and "War (Is Energy Enslaved)" were recorded for a single by Slapp Happy with session musicians in May 1974, but it was not released. The two songs were re-recorded with Henry Cow for this album. "War" was released later on Slapp Happy and Henry Cow's second collaborative album In Praise of Learning. The lyrics of the song "A Worm Is at Work" refers to the song "War", and the lyrics of "Europa" relates to William Blake's Europe a Prophecy (1794).

The songs "Extract from the Messiah" and "A Worm Is at Work" appear on the Virgin Records sampler album V, with "Extract from the Messiah" credited to Slapp Happy and "A Worm Is at Work" credited to Henry Cow.

== CD reissues ==
- In 1993 Virgin Records reissued Desperate Straights together with Slapp Happy's Casablanca Moon on a single CD.
- In 2004 Recommended Records issued a remastered version of Desperate Straights on CD by itself. This edition improves the audio considerably, but includes much longer gaps between the songs, adding about forty seconds of silence.

== Reception ==
Professional ratings
Review scores
Source	Rating
AllMusic	4.5/5 stars
Pitchfork	8.2/10

In a review of Desperate Straights at AllMusic, Ted Mills described the album as "surprisingly melodic", given the musicians behind it. He said it is "light on the art-school angst and heavy on the playfulness". "Some Questions About Hats" reminded Mills of Kurt Weill, while Blegvad's "Strayed" sounded like Kevin Ayers art rock.

Reviewing the album at Pitchfork, Dominique Leone felt that even though Henry Cow features prominently in the recording's baroque sound, it is Moore and Blegvad's songs that "steal the show". They use "delicate" instruments – "soft" piano, brushed cymbals, violin, clarinet – and are closer to Weill and art song than contemporary pop music. Leone recommended Desperate Straights to "anyone into pushing the chamber-pop envelope".

Pete Erskine wrote in New Musical Express in April 1975 that "Desperate Straights cannot be recommended too highly". He described the album as "an extended lament intended to awaken the wearers of rose-tinted spectacles". Erskine stated that the music is "jagged, angular and at time (deliberately) grotesque – not the kind of thing you have humming softly in the background whilst doing the ironing."

== Track listing ==
Side one
No.	Title	Writer(s)	Length
1.	"Some Questions About Hats"	Anthony Moore, Peter Blegvad	1:49
2.	"The Owl"	Moore	2:14
3.	"A Worm Is at Work"	Moore, Blegvad	1:52
4.	"Bad Alchemy"	John Greaves, Blegvad	3:06
5.	"Europa"	Moore, Blegvad	2:48
6.	"Desperate Straights"	Moore	4:14
7.	"Riding Tigers"	Blegvad	1:43

Side two
No.	Title	Writer(s)	Length
8.	"Apes in Capes"	Moore	2:14
9.	"Strayed"	Blegvad	1:53
10.	"Giants"	Moore, Blegvad	1:57
11.	"Excerpt from The Messiah"	George Frideric Handel, arr. Blegvad	1:48
12.	"In the Sickbay"	Dagmar Krause, Blegvad	2:08
13.	"Caucasian Lullaby"	Chris Cutler, Moore	8:20

== Personnel ==
Slapp Happy

- Dagmar Krause (credited as "Dagmar") – voice, Wurlitzer ("In the Sickbay")
- Peter Blegvad – guitar, voice
- Anthony Moore – piano

Henry Cow

- Tim Hodgkinson – clarinet, piano ("Caucasian Lullaby")
- Fred Frith – guitar, violin
- John Greaves – bass guitar, piano ("Bad Alchemy")
- Chris Cutler – drums, etc.

Additional musicians

- Geoff Leigh – flute
- Pierre Moerlen – percussion ("Europa")
- Mont Campbell – French horn
- Mongezi Feza – trumpet
- Nick Evans – trombone
- Lindsay Cooper – bassoon, oboe

Production

- Slapp Happy – producer
- Henry Cow – producer
- Simon Heyworth – producer
- Peter Blegvad – cover art
- Bob Drake – remastered 2004 CD reissue

== Works cited ==
- Garmo, Trond Einar (2020). Henry Cow: An Analysis of Avant Garde Rock. London: ReR Megacorp / November Books. ISBN 978-0-95601-84-4-1.
- Piekut, Benjamin (2019). Henry Cow: The World Is a Problem. Duke University Press. ISBN 978-1-47800-405-9.
