= Sort Of =

Studio album by Slapp Happy
- Released: 1972
- Recorded: May–June 1972
- Studio: Wümme, Bremen, Germany
- Genre: Avant-rock
- Length: 41:42
- Label: Polydor
- Producer: Uwe Nettelbeck

Slapp Happy chronology
Sort Of (1972)	Slapp Happy (1974)

Singles from Sort Of
- 1. "Just a Conversation" b/w "Jumpin' Jonah" Released: 1972, Polydor Records

Professional ratings
Review scores
Source	Rating
AllMusic	2/5 stars

Sort Of is the debut studio album by the avant-rock band Slapp Happy. It was recorded in Wümme, Bremen, Germany in May and June 1972 with Faust as their backing band, and released on LP by Polydor Records in 1972. In 1980 Recommended Records released a limited edition of Sort Of on vinyl, and the album was reissued on CD by Blueprint Records in 1999 with one bonus track. The album was produced by Uwe Nettelbeck.

== Track listing ==
All titles written by Peter Blegvad and Anthony Moore.

Side 1
No.	Title	Length
1.	"Just a Conversation"	4:02
2.	"Paradise Express"	2:40
3.	"I Got Evil"	2:30
4.	"Little Girl's World"	3:25
5.	"Tutankhamun"	2:17
6.	"Mono Plane"	6:50

Side 2
No.	Title	Length
7.	"Blue Flower"	5:10
8.	"I'm All Alone"	2:30
9.	"Who's Gonna Help Me Now?"	2:25
10.	"Small Hands of Stone"	4:38
11.	"Sort Of"	2:15
12.	"Heading for Kyoto"	3:00

CD re-issue bonus tracks
No.	Title	Length
13.	"Jumping Jonah"	3:03

== Personnel ==
- Peter Blegvad – guitar, saxophone, vocals
- Dagmar Krause (credited as "Daggi") – vocals, tambourine, piano, woodblock
- Anthony Moore – guitar, keyboards, vocals
- Gunther Wüsthoff – saxophone on "Paradise Express" and "I'm All Alone"
- Werner "Zappi" Diermaier – drums
- Jean-Hervé Péron – bass guitar
- Engineered by Kurt Graupner
- Album design and cover by David Larcher

=== Notes ===
- Gunther, Zappi and Jean recorded through courtesy of Faust

== CD releases ==
Sort Of was released on CD by Blueprint Records in 1999 with an extra track (from the B-side of their single "Just a Conversation"):

- "Jumpin' Jonah'" (Moore/Blegvad) – the CD was mastered from a vinyl copy as the master tapes had been lost

The same master was also issued in Japan with an additional 3" CD single:

- "Alcohol" (Blegvad)
