= Slapp Happy =

German/English avant-pop group

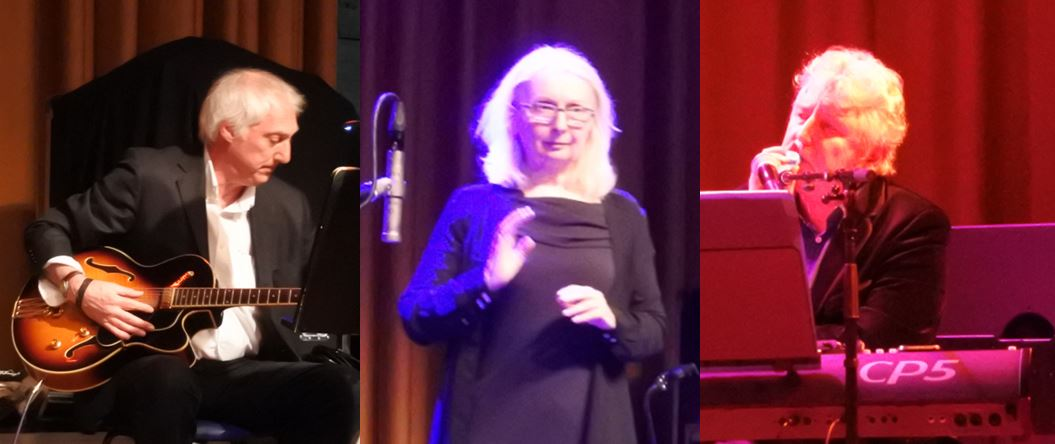
- Slapp Happy, November 2016 l to r: Peter Blegvad, Dagmar Krause, Anthony Moore

Background information
- Origin: Germany; United Kingdom
- Genres: Experimental pop; experimental rock; avant-pop; psychedelic pop; psychedelic rock; experimental
- Years active: 1972–1975; Reunions: 1982; 1997; 2000; 2016–2017
- Labels: Polydor, Virgin, V2, Recommended, EMN
- Past members: Peter Blegvad; Dagmar Krause; Anthony Moore

Slapp Happy was a German/English avant-pop group, formed in Germany in 1972. Their lineup consisted of Anthony Moore (keyboards), Peter Blegvad (guitar) and Dagmar Krause (vocals). The band members moved to England in 1974 where they merged with Henry Cow, but the merger ended soon afterwards and Slapp Happy split up. Slapp Happy's sound was characterised by Dagmar Krause's unique vocal style. From 1982 there have been brief reunions to create an opera called Camera, record the album Ça Va in 1998, and perform shows around the world.

== History ==
=== Germany ===
Slapp Happy was formed in 1972 in Hamburg, Germany, by British experimental composer Anthony Moore. Moore had recorded two avant-garde/experimental solo LPs at Faust's studio in Wümme, Bremen, Germany for Polydor Records. When he presented them with a third album, they rejected it, stating that they wanted something more commercial. Moore obliged and asked his American friend, Peter Blegvad to come to Hamburg and help him write some pop songs. Blegvad recalls responding, "Pop songs. Three-chord stuff. How hard can that be ...?" For them it was a joke. They said, "we'll take the piss out of pop."

Calling themselves Slapp Happy, Moore and Blegvad wrote the song "Just a Conversation" in 20 minutes. They recorded it in Faust's studio with Faust's rhythm section backing them. But when the pair found their singing was not working, they asked Moore's girlfriend (and future wife), Dagmar Krause to sing. She had sung previously on stage and in several groups, but wanted to stop. Reluctantly, however, she agreed to sing, and transformed Slapp Happy from a joke into something unexpected. American music academic Benjamin Piekut said "Krause's voice possessed a levity and grace that was shot through with world-weary Lenyiana." Now a trio, Slapp Happy presented Polydor with "Just a Conversation", and were surprised when the label released it as a single in 1972, backed by "Jumping Jonah", another pop ditty they had recorded. Polydor also gave them a record deal.

Moore and Blegvad continued writing "naive rock", as Blegvad described it, and when they had enough songs, the trio returned to Wümme in May 1972 to record Sort Of, their debut album. Once again, Faust were their backing band. The LP was released later in 1972, but did not sell well, primarily because Slapp Happy refused to perform live. In late 1972 Slapp Happy began recording their second album, Casablanca Moon with Faust. The songs here were more sophisticated and artful than those on Sort Of. Moore's music was harmonically richer, and Blegvad's lyrics more serious and poetic. Blegvad said, "We were snobs about pop music ... Anthony was more interested in making modern classical music." But they acknowledged that their attempts at commercial music were naïve and called their approach "the Douanier Rousseau sound", after the self-taught French artist. But Polydor did not like the direction Slapp Happy were taking and rejected the album.

=== England ===
In early 1973, Slapp Happy left Germany for England. Henry Cow, who had recently signed a record deal with the then emerging Virgin Records, heard a cassette tape of the trio's rejected second album, and were impressed and recommended that Virgin sign them. The record label, however, was concerned about how receptive English audiences would be to Krause's German accent. But after several other musicians and critics advocated them, including Robert Wyatt and Ian MacDonald in New Musical Express, Virgin added Slapp Happy to their roster later in 1973.

Soon after signing, Slapp Happy went to Virgin's Manor Studios in Oxfordshire in early 1974 to re-record Casablanca Moon. Blegvad said Virgin felt that their unreleased second album was "a good demo, but too crude for radio, so we re-recorded the same songs with swisher production". Session musicians were used, under the direction of violinist Graham Preskett, with new arrangements of the songs by Roger Wootton of Comus. Virgin released the album as Slapp Happy in May 1974. The new recording attracted the attention of the press, particularly after Wyatt endorsed it. But Henry Cow were not so complimentary. Blegvad remembers them saying, "Well, it's OK, the songs aren't bad, but it's really a missed opportunity. You made a conventional pop record and you could have done something more."

It was not until 1980 that Recommended Records released the original Casablanca Moon (with Faust) as Acnalbasac Noom (the words of the original title written backwards). Comparison of the two releases revealed two very different musical arrangements. Acnalbasac Noom had a raw and unsophisticated feel about it, whereas Slapp Happy tended to be more sentimental with more complex arrangements, including a string orchestra.

In June 1974, there were plans for a joint appearance by Slapp Happy and Virgin label mates Henry Cow and Wyatt at a free concert in Hyde Park in London, but this was cancelled at the last minute. However, on 25 June Slapp Happy recorded a Top Gear session for the BBC, enlisting the help of former and current Cow members Geoff Leigh, Fred Frith and Lindsay Cooper, plus Wyatt, who contributed guest vocals and percussion to a version of Blegvad's "A Little Something" from Casablanca Moon. Credited as "Slapp Happy & Friends", this was later released in 1994 on Wyatt's compilation album, Flotsam Jetsam.

Slapp Happy returned to the studio in May 1974 to record two new compositions with session musicians, "Europa" and "War (Is Energy Enslaved)". Virgin had requested a single that was "radio friendly", but upon hearing the songs they rejected them, stating that they felt they were better suited for an album. This caused Blegvad and Moore to rethink their songwriting strategy, and they began producing more serious and challenging music. Moore said they had written material "which had to be executed using a musical vocabulary greater than Peter or I could handle." This led to Slapp Happy asking Henry Cow to be their backing band on their second album for Virgin. After discussions between the two bands, they collaborated in November 1974 and recorded Desperate Straights. "Europa" and "War" were re-recorded, and the album was later released under the name "Slapp Happy/Henry Cow".

The success of this collaboration surprised everyone, considering how dissimilar the two bands were. The music often had a Berlin Cabaret feel about it with a taste of avant-garde jazz. Slapp Happy and Henry Cow decided to merge and returned to the studio in early 1975 to record Henry Cow's In Praise of Learning. The only real contribution from Slapp Happy (besides Dagmar's singing) was the Moore/Blegvad song "War", which blended in well with the album's political aggression. But differences in approach between the two groups had come to a head in April 1975 and Moore and Blegvad quit, suggesting that Henry Cow's music was too serious (and political) for their liking. Krause, however, elected to remain with Henry Cow, who needed a vocalist. This effectively meant the end of Slapp Happy as a band. They did, however, record one more single, "Johnny's Dead", without Krause, which was released in July 1975. It was credited to "Slapp Happy featuring Anthony Moore", and was the beginning of Moore's solo career, in which he spelt his name "More".

=== Reunions ===
Moore and Blegvad then both embarked on separate solo careers. In 1982 the trio reunited briefly to record a Slapp Happy single, "Everybody's Slimmin' (Even Men and Women)" on their own private label, Half-Cat Records. Here Krause sings rap-style to a rhythm box sound. They also performed live (for the first time ever) during the "Dial M For Music" festival, held at London's Institute of Contemporary Arts on 10 September 1982.

The three collaborated again in 1991 on a specially commissioned television opera "Camera", produced by After Image for Channel 4, based on an original idea by Krause, with words by Blegvad and music by Moore. Krause played the lead character "Melusina" and the opera was broadcast two years later on Channel 4 in the United Kingdom. The soundtrack Camera was released on CD in 2000, although under the names "Dagmar Krause, Anthony Moore and Peter Blegvad" and not "Slapp Happy".

In 1997, Slapp Happy reunited again to record a new studio album Ça Va on Richard Branson's new V2 label. It was Slapp Happy's first album since 1975 and the music picked up from where it had left off with literate and quirky pop songs. A departure from the past, however, was that they made the music themselves, playing all the instruments and using looped samples to produce a layered sound on many of the tracks.

Slapp Happy was popular in Japan and toured there in 2000, playing on stage without any backing musicians. A CD, Live in Japan, was released in 2001 in Japan only.

Krause, Moore and Blegvad reformed Slapp Happy again in November 2016 to perform with Faust at the Week-End festival in Cologne, Germany. The two groups also played together on 10–11 February 2017 at Cafe Oto in London. On 24 February 2017 Slapp Happy, without Faust, performed at Mt. Rainier Hall, Shibuya in Tokyo. In September 2017, Slapp Happy and Faust played at the 10th Rock in Opposition festival in Carmaux, France. They made a final appearance in November 2017 in Brussels, Belgium.

== Music ==
Slapp Happy's music was eccentric pop with an "avant-garde" twist to it. It drew on a variety of musical idioms, including waltzes, bossa novas, French chansons and tangos. The songs' lyrics were literate and playful while the mood varied from "dreamy" to sinister. However, it was Dagmar Krause's unusual and eerie high-pitched voice that was the group's most arresting feature. Her German-inflected vocals ranged from a sweet melodious croon to the "love-it-or-hate-it" Armageddon style typified on In Praise of Learning.

== Members ==
- Anthony Moore – keyboards, guitar, percussion, programming, tape manipulation, toy theremin, melodica, harmonica, vocals
- Peter Blegvad – guitar, bass guitar, saxophone, clarinet, percussion, harmonica, vocals
- Dagmar Krause – vocals, piano, percussion, harmonica

Note: Dagmar Krause was credited as "Daggi" on Slapp Happy's first album, Sort Of (1972). On the next three albums, Slapp Happy (1974), Desperate Straights (1975) and In Praise of Learning (1975), she was credited as "Dagmar". From Acnalbasac Noom (1980) onwards Krause was credited with her full name.

== Discography ==
The year below indicates the release date (not the recording date).

=== Albums ===
- Sort Of (1972, LP, Polydor Records, Germany)
- Slapp Happy (also known as Casablanca Moon) (1974, LP, Virgin Records, UK)
- Desperate Straights (with Henry Cow) (1975, LP, Virgin Records, UK)
- In Praise of Learning (with Henry Cow) (1975, LP, Virgin Records, UK)
- Acnalbasac Noom (1980, LP, Recommended Records, UK)
- Ça Va (1998, CD, V2 Records, UK)
- Camera (as "Dagmar Krause/Anthony Moore/Peter Blegvad") (2000, CD, Blueprint Records, UK)
- Live in Japan (2001, CD, FMN Records, Japan)

=== Singles ===
- "Just a Conversation" / "Jumpin' Jonah" (1972, 7", Polydor Records, Germany)
- "Casablanca Moon" / "Slow Moon's Rose" (1974, 7", Virgin Records, UK)
- "Johnny's Dead" / "Mr. Rainbow" (1975, 7", Virgin Records, UK) – credited to "Slapp Happy featuring Anthony Moore"
- "Alcohol" (1981, 7", Recommended Records, UK) – one-sided bonus single issued with RēR re-issue of Sort Of
- "Everybody's Slimmin' (Even Men and Women)" / "Blue-Eyed William" (1983, 7", Half-Cat Records, UK)

== Works cited ==
- Cutler, Chris, ed. (2009). "The Road: Volumes 1–5". The 40th Anniversary Henry Cow Box Set (box set booklet). Henry Cow. London: Recommended Records.
- Cutler, Chris, ed. (2019). "Book 1 | The Studio: Official Releases". The Henry Cow Box Redux: The Complete Henry Cow (box set booklet). Henry Cow. London: Recommended Records.
- Piekut, Benjamin (2019). Henry Cow: The World Is a Problem. Duke University Press. ISBN 978-1-47800-405-9.
