= Dagmar Krause =

German singer (born 1950)

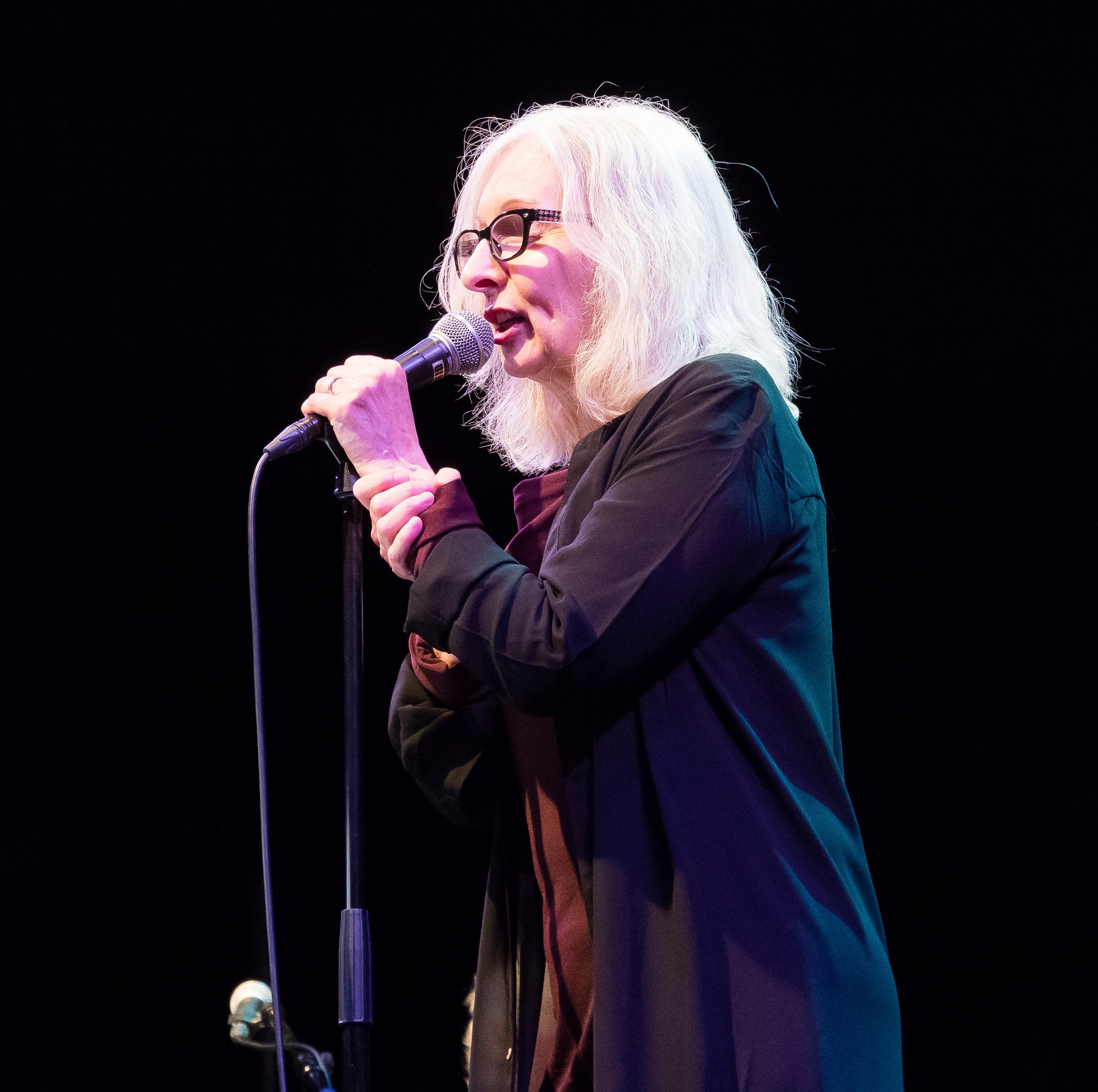
- Krause performing in 2017

Background information
- Born: 4 June 1950 (age 76); Hamburg, West Germany
- Genres: Avant-rock, experimental, cabaret, classical
- Occupation: Musician
- Instruments: Vocals, piano
- Years active: 1968–present
- Labels: Hannibal, Island, Voiceprint

Dagmar Krause (born 4 June 1950) is a German singer, best known for her work with avant-rock groups including Slapp Happy, Henry Cow, and Art Bears. She is also noted for her coverage of songs by Bertolt Brecht, Kurt Weill and Hanns Eisler.

== Biography ==
=== Bands and projects ===
Dagmar Krause was born in Hamburg, West Germany on 4 June 1950. She began her professional career at the age of 14 as a singer in Hamburg clubs on the Reeperbahn. In 1968 she was invited to join the City Preachers, a contemporary folk/protest group she once half-jokingly described as a German version of The Mamas & the Papas. She contributed vocals to their 1968 album Der Kürbis, das Transportproblem und die Traumtänzer (The Pumpkin, the Problem of Transport and the Dream-dancers), a spin-off from a German TV show. The City Preachers broke up in 1969, but their lead singer Inga Rumpf and Krause reunited in 1970 to record I.D. Company, the name of a studio project where each vocalist sung lead on and determined the direction of one side of the LP (Krause's side indicated her future direction with its avant-garde slant).

Hamburg had a thriving avant-garde scene that attracted numerous European musicians interested in pursuing aesthetic freedom and experimental music. It was here that Krause met, and later married, British experimental composer Anthony Moore. In 1972, Moore, Krause, and Moore's visiting American friend, singer-songwriter Peter Blegvad, formed Slapp Happy, a self-described "naive rock" group which mixed simple pop structures with obfuscatory lyrics drawing equally from semiotic and symbolist traditions. Slapp Happy was the beginning of Krause's international musical career. They recorded two albums in Germany for Polydor with Faust as their backing band, Sort Of (1972) and what subsequently became known as Acnalbasac Noom (not released at the time). Then they moved to London where they recorded a new arrangement of Acnalbasac Noom for Virgin Records, released as Slapp Happy, also known as Casablanca Moon (1974). The original Acnalbasac Noom only saw the light of day in 1980 when it was released by Recommended Records.

In 1974, Slapp Happy merged with Virgin label-mates Henry Cow, a politically oriented avant-rock group, and they made two albums, Desperate Straights (1974) and In Praise of Learning (1975). But differences in approach caused Moore and Blegvad to withdraw Slapp Happy from the merger. Krause, however, elected to remain with Henry Cow, which led to the end of Slapp Happy.

Krause's singing added a new dimension to Henry Cow's repertoire and their tricky time signatures enhanced her vocal powers. Henry Cow toured Europe for two years, during which time they released a live album Concerts (1976) which included Krause singing duos with Robert Wyatt. But in May 1976 she was forced to withdraw from Henry Cow's hectic tour schedule due to ill health and returned to Hamburg. In October 1977, still unable to tour she left Henry Cow, but agreed to sing on their next studio album Hopes and Fears.

Hopes and Fears began in 1978 as a Henry Cow album but differences of opinion in the group about its content resulted in it being credited to Art Bears, a new band consisting of Krause, Chris Cutler and Fred Frith. Art Bears went on to make two more albums of songs, Winter Songs (1979) and The World as It Is Today (1981).

Kevin Coyne worked with her on the 1979 album Babble, with Virgin Records. At the stage presentation, Coyne suggested that the lovers' destructive relationship could have echoed The Moors Murderers. Negative publicity in The Sun and The Evening Standard resulted in short-notice cancellation of two performances at the Theatre Royal Stratford East by Newham Council. The show was put on at Oval House in Kennington for four nights. Reviewing the show for the NME, Paul Du Noyer wrote:

Babble is a particularly thorough, painstaking exploration of the reality of one relationship, stripped of romance and artifice. The format employed is correspondingly stark. Against a stage-set of light-bulb, table and chairs Coyne and his partner Dagmar Krause stand at either side; the only accompaniment comes from Bob Ward and Brian Godding, playing electric and acoustic guitar in the gloom behind.

In 1983, Krause joined a new band News from Babel, featuring core members Krause, Chris Cutler, Lindsay Cooper and Zeena Parkins. They recorded two albums Work Resumed on the Tower (1984) and Letters Home (1985). After News from Babel, Krause was involved in a number of projects and collaborations. She performed on the Michael Nyman/Paul Richards art song, "The Kiss" with Omar Ebrahim on the Michael Nyman Band album The Kiss and Other Movements (1985). She also featured on Music for Other Occasions (1986) with Lindsay Cooper, Domestic Stories (1992) with Chris Cutler and Lutz Glandien, Each in Our Own Thoughts (1994) with Tim Hodgkinson, and A Scientific Dream and a French Kiss (1998) with Marie Goyette.

In 1984, Krause sang backing vocals on "Here & There" by The Stranglers. The song appeared on the b-side of their single, "Skin Deep". It was subsequently added to the 2001 remastered edition of the parent album, Aural Sculpture.

In 1991, Krause, Moore and Blegvad reunited to work on a "Camera" (Italian for "Room") a specially written television opera, made by the UK production company After Image and commissioned by Channel 4 Television. It was based on an original idea by Krause, with words by Blegvad and music by Moore. Krause played the lead character "Melusina" and the opera was broadcast two years later on Channel 4. Slapp Happy reformed briefly in 1997 to record Ça Va and they toured Japan in 2000.

In 2010, Krause joined Comicoperando, a tribute to the music of Robert Wyatt whose line-up has included Richard Sinclair, Annie Whitehead, Gilad Atzmon, Alex Maguire, Chris Cutler, John Edwards, Michel Delville, Karen Mantler and Cristiano Calcagnile.

Krause, Moore and Blegvad reformed Slapp Happy again in November 2016 to perform with Faust at the Week-End festival in Cologne, Germany. The two groups also played together on 10–11 February 2017 at Cafe Oto in London. On 24 February 2017 Slapp Happy, without Faust, performed at Mt. Rainier Hall, Shibuya in Tokyo.

Krause contributed vocals to two albums by Matthew Edwards and the Unfortunates Folklore (2017) and The Birmingham Poets (2019).

=== Solo work ===
Krause's fascination with Weimar-era cabaret and her love for the work of playwright Bertolt Brecht and his musical collaborators Kurt Weill and Hanns Eisler produced some of her most satisfying work. In 1978 she starred in a London art-theatre production of the Brecht and Weill play Rise and Fall of the City of Mahagonny, and in 1985 she sang Brecht and Weill's "Surabaya Johnny" on the Hal Willner-produced Lost in the Stars: The Music of Kurt Weill. John Dougan wrote at AllMusic that Krause's "elegant alto was perfectly suited to the emotionally and politically charged music of Brecht and Weill".

In 1986, Krause made two solo albums: Supply and Demand: Songs by Brecht/Weill and Eisler and Tank Battles: The Songs of Hanns Eisler. These albums were also sung in German and released as Angebot und Nachfrage and Panzerschlacht: Die Lieder von Hanns Eisler. Lyrically they continued the trend of earlier songs of social conscience Krause had performed, for example on Henry Cow's "Living in the Heart of the Beast". Supply and Demand and Tank Battles are seen by many as Krause's best work, while the latter is considered to be one of the finest interpretations of Eisler's work. She performed selections from these albums live at various venues, most notably the Edinburgh Festival, which was documented on Voiceprint Radio Sessions (1993).

=== Singing style ===
As a vocalist, Krause has been described by critics as an acquired taste. Her "husky, vibrato-laden alto" voice can range from a sweet melodious croon in the Slapp Happy discography, to the dramatic and intense style typified on albums like Henry Cow's In Praise of Learning. Part of the intrigue of Krause's singing are her German-inflected vocals, "... but whether she sings in German or English (which she often does on the same record), she retains her impeccable phrasing and ability to inject the most oft-heard lyric with almost palpable emotion."

In a review of The 40th Anniversary Henry Cow Box Set (2009), critic John Kelman wrote for All About Jazz that "the kinds of intervallic leaps and harmonic sophistication required of a singer [in Henry Cow] make Krause an undervalued and underrated singer in this history of modern music."

== Discography ==
This is a selection of albums Krause has performed on, showing the year they were recorded.

=== Bands and projects ===
With The City Preachers

- Der Kürbis, das Transportproblem und die Traumtänzer (1968, LP, Decca Records)
- Back to the City (1971, LP, Hörzu)

With I.D. Company

- I.D. Company (1970, LP, Hörzu, Electrola)

With Slapp Happy

- Sort Of (1972, LP, Polydor Records)
- Acnalbasac Noom (1973, LP, Recommended Records)
- Slapp Happy (also known as Casablanca Moon) (1974, LP, Virgin Records)
- Ça Va (1997, CD, V2 Records)
- Live in Japan (2000, CD, FMN Records)

With Slapp Happy/Henry Cow

- Desperate Straights (1974, LP, Virgin Records)
- In Praise of Learning (1975, LP, Virgin Records)

With Henry Cow

- Concerts (1976, 2xLP, Caroline Records, UK)
- The Virgin Years – Souvenir Box (1991, 3xCD, East Side Digital Records, US)
- Henry Cow Box (2006, 7xCD, Recommended Records, UK)
- Stockholm & Göteborg (2008, CD, Recommended Records, UK)
- The 40th Anniversary Henry Cow Box Set (2009, 9xCD+DVD, Recommended Records, UK)
- The Henry Cow Box Redux: The Complete Henry Cow (2019, 17xCD+DVD, Recommended Records, UK)

With Art Bears

- Hopes and Fears (1978, LP, Recommended Records)
- Winter Songs (1979, LP, Recommended Records)
- The World as It Is Today (1981, LP, Recommended Records)
- The Art Box (2004, 6xCD, Recommended Records, UK)

With Kevin Coyne

- Babble (1979, LP, Virgin Records)

With Commuters

- Commuters (1983, EP, Amphibious Records)

With News from Babel

- Work Resumed on the Tower (1984, LP, Recommended Records)
- Letters Home (1985, LP, Recommended Records)

With Michael Nyman Band

- The Kiss and Other Movements (1985, LP, E.G. Records)

With Duck and Cover

- Re Records Quarterly Vol.1 No.2 (1985, LP, Recommended Records)

With Lindsay Cooper

- Music for Other Occasions (1986, LP, No Man's Land)

With Anthony Moore and Peter Blegvad

- Camera (1991, CD, Blueprint Records)

With Chris Cutler and Lutz Glandien

- Domestic Stories (1992, CD, Recommended Records)

With Tim Hodgkinson

- Each in Our Own Thoughts (1994, CD, Woof Records)

With Marie Goyette

- A Scientific Dream and a French Kiss (1998, CD, Resurgence)

With The Orckestra

- "Unreleased Orckestra Extract" (3" CD single, 2006, Recommended Records, UK)

=== Solo ===
- Supply and Demand: Songs by Brecht/Weill and Eisler (1986, LP, Hannibal Records)
  - Angebot und Nachfrage (1986, LP, Hannibal Records) – The above in the original German
- Tank Battles: The Songs of Hanns Eisler (1988, LP, Island Records)
  - Panzerschlacht: Die Lieder von Hanns Eisler (1988, LP, Island Records) – The above in the original German
- Voiceprint Radio Sessions (1993, CD, Voiceprint Records)

=== Other contributions ===
- The Grid: 456 (1992, LP, Virgin Records) – Krause sings on one track
