= Peter Blegvad =

American singer-songwriter (born 1951)

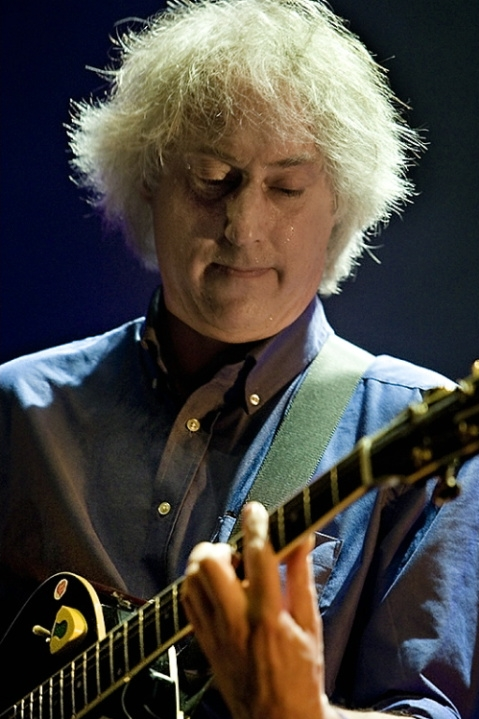
- Blegvad with the Peter Blegvad Trio at a RIO Festival in Southern France, April 2007

Background information
- Born: August 14, 1951 (age 74); New York City, US
- Origin: Letchworth, Hertfordshire, England
- Genres: Avant-rock, experimental
- Occupations: Musician, lyricist, cartoonist, illustrator
- Instruments: Guitar, vocals
- Years active: 1960s–present
- Labels: Virgin, Recommended

Peter Blegvad (born August 14, 1951) is an American musician, singer-songwriter, writer, and cartoonist. He was a founding member of German/English avant-pop band Slapp Happy, which later merged briefly with Henry Cow, and has released many solo and collaborative albums. He is the son of Lenore and Erik Blegvad, who were respectively, a children's book author and illustrator.

== Biography ==
=== Early years ===
Peter Blegvad's life began in America – he was born in New York City and originally raised in Connecticut. When he was 14, the Blegvad family moved to England in 1965, unhappy with the social climate of America following the assassination of John F. Kennedy and the threat posed by the Vietnam draft to Peter and his younger brother Kristoffer. Blegvad was educated at St Christopher School, Letchworth, a boarding school where he met his musical collaborator Anthony Moore. Moore and Blegvad played in various bands during their schooldays, alongside fellow musicians such as Neil Murray (then a drummer, later a well-known hard rock bass guitarist).

=== Slapp Happy and Henry Cow ===
In 1972, Blegvad followed the itinerant Moore to Hamburg, Germany, where the two formed the avant-pop trio Slapp Happy with Dagmar Krause. Slapp Happy recorded two albums for Polydor Germany with krautrock group Faust as their backing band. Polydor released the first, Sort Of in 1972, but rejected the second, Casablanca Moon.

Blegvad had got to know Faust due to playing with them at their base in Wümme, and would subsequently go on tour with them in the UK, playing guitar as a live band member. This in turn put him in contact with Faust's tourmates, the avant-rock group Henry Cow, with whom he was "soon making all sorts of plans". The rejection of Casablanca Moon prompted Slapp Happy to relocate to London where they signed up with Virgin Records and re-recorded Casablanca Moon, released in 1974 by Virgin as Slapp Happy. (The original Casablanca Moon was later released by Recommended Records as Acnalbasac Noom in 1980.)

In 1974, Slapp Happy merged briefly with Henry Cow, recording two albums in 1975, Desperate Straights and In Praise of Learning. Shortly after recording In Praise of Learning, first Moore and then Blegvad left Henry Cow due to incompatibilities with the other musicians in the group. Blegvad has confessed that the technical demands of Henry Cow's music were beyond him ("It was discovered – not to my surprise – that I actually couldn't play Henry Cow music. The chords and the time signatures were too complicated. And... just generally, Anthony and I felt kinda lost...") but it was also clear that there were crucial differences in artistic approach. Blegvad would later reveal (in an interview for the Hearsay fanzine) that "the piece that got me kicked out was "Living in the Heart of the Beast". I was assigned the task for the collective to come up with suitable verbals, and I wrote two verses about a woman throwing raisins at a pile of bones. Tim Hodgkinson just said, I'm sorry, this is not at all what we want. And he wrote reams of this political tirade. I admired his passion and application but it left me cold. I am to my bones a flippant individual, I don't know why I was created thus or what I'm trying to deny, but it clashed with the extreme seriousness. People who take themselves very seriously make me giggle, unless they're pointing a weapon at me or my loved ones".

Due to Krause's decision to remain with Henry Cow, Slapp Happy dissolved and the three members went their separate ways. Despite the simultaneous foundering of Blegvad's involvement with both groups, it was not the end of his working relationships with the various members. Many of Blegvad's future solo albums and projects would feature former members of Slapp Happy and Henry Cow; and Slapp Happy themselves would periodically reunite in 1982, 1991, 1997, 2000 and 2016–17.

=== Solo work and collaborative projects ===
In the meantime, Blegvad returned to New York to work as a cartoonist, but maintained his interest in music. In 1977 he reunited with Henry Cow bass player John Greaves to collaborate on the album Kew. Rhone. – an unusual cross-genre release combining elements of minimalism, avant-garde jazz and progressive rock. The album was also notable for its personnel, which included celebrated New York jazz musicians Carla Bley, Michael Mantler, and Andrew Cyrille among the performers. As a musical document Kew. Rhone. remains both ambitious and unclassifiable; Blegvad's literate and playful lyrics are well-matched by Greaves' complex song structures. Blegvad would later continue his collaboration with Greaves in 1995 on Unearthed, a collection of spoken word pieces set to Greaves' music.

In 1978, Blegvad reunited with more of his onetime Slapp Happy/Henry Cow colleagues (Chris Cutler, Dagmar Krause and Fred Frith) when he joined the live band for the only tour made by Art Bears.

In the 1980s, Blegvad released a number of albums on the Virgin Records label, including The Naked Shakespeare and Knights Like This. Although these were commercially unsuccessful, one of Blegvad's songs from this period, "How Beautiful You Are", was covered by Leo Sayer on the Have You Ever Been in Love album. By contrast, Downtime, an independent release in the late 1980s produced by Chris Cutler, features mainly very simple demos (often recorded cheaply in professional studios' "downtime"). King Strut and Other Stories (Silvertone, 1990) is a collection of short stories set to simply arranged, professionally produced music played in many cases by noted session musicians. The album features XTC's Andy Partridge while Orpheus – The Lowdown (2003) is a whole album in collaboration with Partridge.

Krause, Moore and Blegvad reformed Slapp Happy in November 2016 to perform with Faust at the Week-End festival in Cologne, Germany. The two groups also played together on February 10–11, 2017 at Cafe Oto in London. On February 24, 2017 Slapp Happy, without Faust, performed at Mt. Rainier Hall, Shibuya in Tokyo.

In 2007, his song “Daughter” was covered by Loudon Wainwright III for the end credits of Judd Apatow’s comedy, Knocked Up.

=== Work as cartoonist, educator, radio dramatist, etc. ===
From 1992 to 1999, The Independent ran Blegvad's strangely surreal comic strip, Leviathan, which received much critical praise for blending some of the most interesting elements of Krazy Kat with a coming-of-age-esque story akin to Calvin and Hobbes. Some of the strips have been collected in the 2001 volume The Book of Leviathan. In 2013 the book was published as Le livre de Leviathan in French and received the "Prix Révélation" at the 41st Angoulême International Comics Festival in 2014. Other comics and illustrations by Blegvad have appeared in The Ganzfeld and Ben Katchor's Picture Story 2.

He has also conducted two- and three-week writing courses at Warwick University, England, in association with the National Academy for Gifted and Talented Youth (NAGTY), and the new University of Warwick venture for gifted and creative children, International Gateway for Gifted Youth (IGGY).

In 2011, Atlas Publishing (trading as "The London Institute of 'Pataphysics") published Blegvad's The Bleaching Stream, described as an "interview format biography."

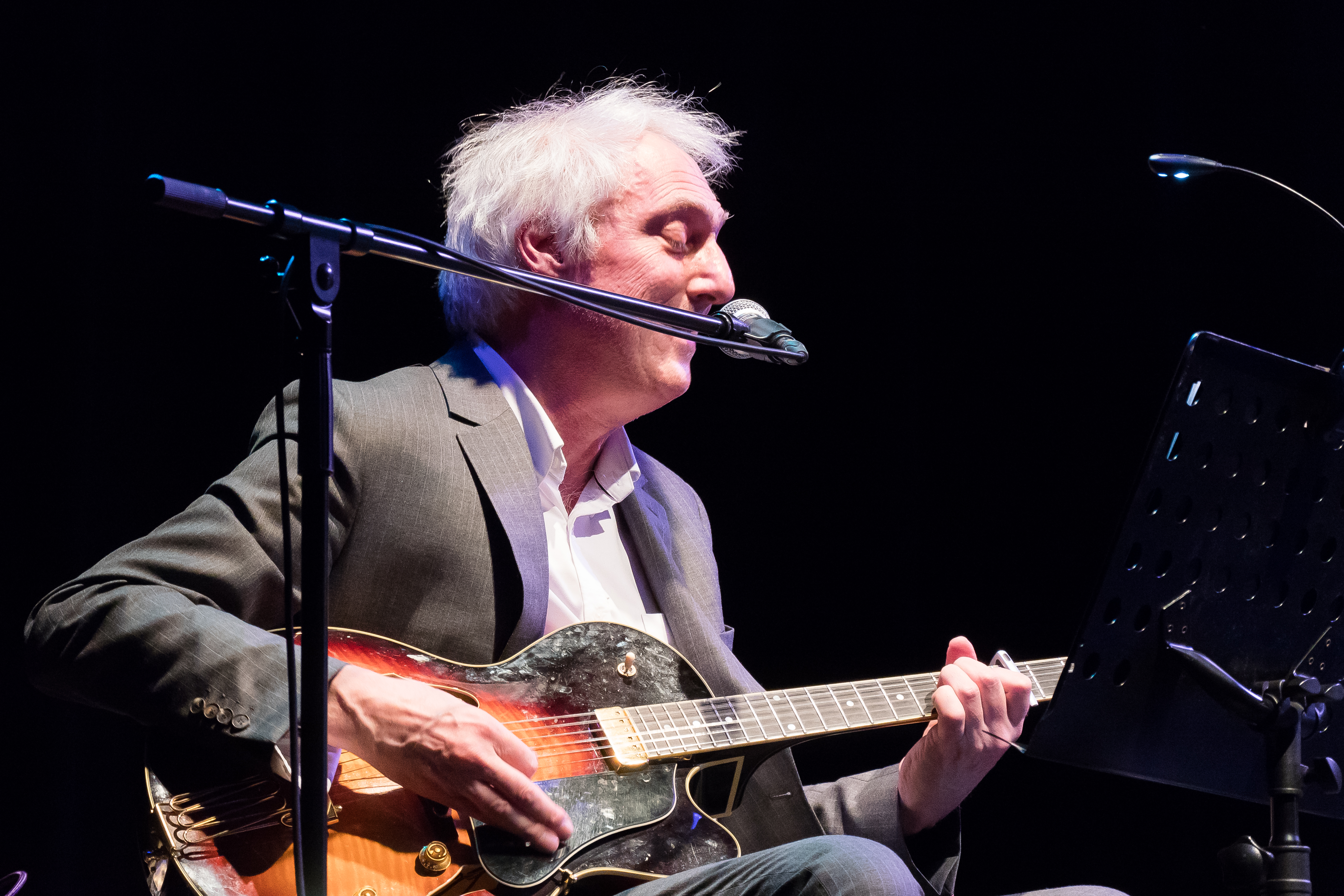
Blegvad performing with Slapp Happy in Tokyo, February 24, 2017

Blegvad's work for BBC Radio 3 includes numerous "eartoons" for the weekly poetry strand The Verb, and a number of radiophonic dramas with Langham Research Centre and with Iain Chambers. These include guest+host=ghost, featuring Nick Cave; Use It Or Lose It which won a Radio Academy Award in 2012; Chinoiserie; Eschatology, starring Harriet Walter and Guy Paul; and The Impossible Book (2016).

His 2015 drama with Iain Chambers for Radio Australia, The Eternal Moment starring John Ramm and Emma Powell, was shortlisted for the 2015 Prix Europa.

== Discography ==
=== Solo ===
- The Naked Shakespeare (1983, LP, Virgin Records)
- Knights Like This (1985, LP, Virgin Records)
- Downtime (1988, LP, Recommended Records)
- King Strut & Other Stories (1990, LP/CT/CD, Silvertone Records)
- Just Woke Up (1995, CD, East Side Digital)
- Hangman's Hill (1998, CD, Recommended Records)
- Choices Under Pressure (2001, CD, Voiceprint Records)
- Go Figure (2017, CD, Recommended Records)
- The Peter Blegvad Bandbox (2018, 6xCD boxed set, Recommended Records)
- Go Figure (2019, Recommended Records) (Peter Blegvad Quintet)

=== Bands and projects ===
With Slapp Happy

- Sort Of (1972, LP, Polydor Records)
- Slapp Happy (also known as Casablanca Moon) (1974, LP, Virgin Records)
- Slapp Happy or Slapphappy (1980, LP, Recommended Records)
- Ça Va (1998, CD, V2 Records)
- Live in Japan (2001, CD, F.M.N. Sound Factory)

With Slapp Happy and Henry Cow

- Desperate Straights (1974, LP, Virgin Records)
- In Praise of Learning (1975, LP, Virgin Records)
- The 40th Anniversary Henry Cow Box Set (2009, 9xCD+DVD, Recommended Records, UK)
- The Henry Cow Box Redux: The Complete Henry Cow (2019, 17xCD+DVD, Recommended Records, UK)

With John Greaves and Lisa Herman

- Kew. Rhone. (1977, LP, Virgin Records)

With National Health

- Of Queues and Cures (1978, LP, Charly Records) (recitation on "Squarer For Maud")

With John Zorn

- Locus Solus (1983, LP, Rift Records)

With The Golden Palominos

- Blast of Silence (Axed My Baby for a Nickel) (1986, LP, Celluloid Records)

With The Lodge

- Smell of a Friend (1988, LP, Island Records)

With Dr. Huelsenbecks Mentale Heilmethode

- Dada (1992, LP, Rough Trade Records)

With John Greaves

- Unearthed (1995, CD, Sub Rosa)

With Anthony Moore and Dagmar Krause

- Camera (2000, CD, Blueprint Records)

With Andy Partridge

- Orpheus – The Lowdown (2003, CD, Ape House)
- Gonwards (2012, CD, Ape House)

== Bibliography (as writer / illustrator) ==
=== Radio dramas ===
- guest+host=ghost (2005, BBC Radio 3)
- Use It or Lose It (2011, BBC Radio 3)
- Chinoiserie (2014, BBC Radio 3)
- Eschatology (2014, BBC Radio 3)
- The Eternal Moment (2015, Radio Australia)
- The Right to Write (2016, BBC Radio 3)

=== Other ===
- The Book of Leviathan (2001, Overlook)
- Headcheese (1994, Atlas Press)
- The Bleaching Stream (2011, London Institute of 'Pataphysics)
- Kew. Rhone. (2014, Uniformbooks)
- Selected Songs by Slapp Happy (2016, Amateur Enterprises) (illustrator)
- Imagine, Observe, Remember (2020, Uniformbooks)
- Milk: Through a Glass Darkly (2023, Uniformbooks)
