= Slapp Happy (album) =

Studio album by Slapp Happy
- Released: May 1974
- Recorded: 1974
- Studio: The Manor, Oxfordshire, England
- Genre: Art pop・baroque pop
- Length: 36:26
- Label: Virgin (UK)
- Producer: Slapp Happy, Steve Morse

Slapp Happy chronology
| Sort Of (1972) | Slapp Happy (1974) | Desperate Straights (1975) |

Singles from Slapp Happy
- 1. "Casablanca Moon" b/w "Slow Moon's Rose" Released: 1974, Virgin Records

Slapp Happy (also known as Casablanca Moon) is a studio album by German/British avant-pop group Slapp Happy, recorded at Virgin Records' Manor Studio in 1974.

This album was originally recorded in 1973 in Germany under a working title of Casablanca Moon with Faust as Slapp Happy's backing band, but Polydor Records in Germany rejected it. After moving to London and signing with Virgin Records, Slapp Happy re-recorded the album (at Virgin's request) with session musicians under the direction of violinist Graham Preskett, and with new arrangements of the songs by Roger Wootton of Comus. Virgin released the album in 1974 as Slapp Happy. A second UK pressing of the album used the title Casablanca Moon on the label (though not on the cover). Later CD reissues officially used the title Casablanca Moon.

In 1980 Recommended Records released the original recording (with Faust) as Acnalbasac Noom (Casablanca Moon with the words written backwards).

== Reception ==
Professional ratings
Review scores
| Source | Rating |
|---|---|
| AllMusic | 4/5 stars |

Reviewing the album at AllMusic, Richie Unterberger wrote that Slapp Happy's songwriting here is better than on their first album, Sort Of. It has "witty and oddball" lyrics that are not "pretentious", and are showcased by Krause's German-inflected singing. Unterberger compared some of the tracks on the album to Yoko Ono's 1970s songs, but felt that "Krause's vocals are much better than Ono's, while just as distinctive." Writing in The Rough Guide to Rock, Mark Ellingham noted: "Slapp Happy found themselves at Virgin's Manor studios, recording the album with a virtual chamber orchestra of musicians."

In a 1974 review in Audio, Carl Anthony said Slapp Happy has "[s]ome of the most extraordinary lyrics I've heard in a long time", and when they are sung by Krause in her "[h]aunting" voice, the deceptively "normal" music is transformed into "something surreal and distant", "alien but strangely inviting". He described the recording of the album as "clean and open" with "clear and well projected" vocals. Anthony added that Slapp Happy "is no ordinary group" and opined that they are "going to be big – no question of it".

== Track listing ==
All music composed by Anthony Moore and Peter Blegvad, except where noted.

Side one
| No. | Title | Writer(s) | Length |
|---|---|---|---|
| 1. | "Casablanca Moon" | | 2:45 |
| 2. | "Me and Parvati" | | 3:22 |
| 3. | "Half Way There" | Blegvad | 3:14 |
| 4. | "Michelangelo" | | 2:33 |
| 5. | "Dawn" | | 3:17 |
| 6. | "Mr. Rainbow" | Blegvad | 3:49 |

Side two
| No. | Title | Writer(s) | Length |
|---|---|---|---|
| 7. | "The Secret" | | 3:28 |
| 8. | "A Little Something" | Blegvad | 4:30 |
| 9. | "The Drum" | | 3:34 |
| 10. | "Haiku" | | 3:01 |
| 11. | "Slow Moon's Rose" | Moore | 2:53 |

== Personnel ==
Sources: Peter Blegvad, Discogs

- Dagmar Krause (credited as "Dagmar") – lead vocals
- Peter Blegvad – second vocals, guitar (uncredited)
- Anthony Moore – keyboards

=== Guests ===
- Marc Singer – drums
- Dave Wintour – bass guitar
- Graham Preskett – violin, mandolin
- Roger Wootton – backing vocals
- Eddie Sparrow – drums, congas, whistles, etc.
- Jean Hervé Peron – bass guitar
- Clare Deniz – cello
- Nick Worters – double bass
- Jeremy Baines – sausage bassoon
- Andy Leggett – jugs
- Clem Cattini – drums
- Henry Lowther – trumpet
- Geoff Leigh – saxophones
- Keshave Sathe – tablas, tamboura

=== Sound and art work ===
- Slapp Happy – producers
- Steve Morse – producer
- Simon Heyworth – mixer, engineer
- Steve Taylor – mixer, engineer
- David Larcher – cover photograph
- Carol Aitken – cover design

== CD reissues ==
In 1993 Virgin Records reissued Slapp Happy as Casablanca Moon together with Slapp Happy's Desperate Straights on CD.

== Works cited ==
- Piekut, Benjamin (2019). Henry Cow: The World Is a Problem. Duke University Press. ISBN 978-1-47800-405-9.
