= Gravity (Fred Frith album) =

Studio album by Fred Frith
- Released: 1980
- Recorded: August 1979, Sweden and Switzerland; November 1979, United States; January 1980, Switzerland
- Genres: Experimental rock; avant-garde; world
- Length: 46:24
- Label: Ralph (US)
- Producers: Fred Frith and Etienne Conod

Fred Frith chronology
With Friends Like These (1979)	Gravity (1980)	Speechless (1981)

Singles from Gravity
- 1. "Dancing in the Street" b/w "What a Dilemma" Released: 1980

"Dancing in the Street"

Gravity is a 1980 solo album by the English guitarist and composer Fred Frith. It was Frith's second solo album, and his first since Henry Cow disbanded in 1978. It was originally released in the United States on the Residents' Ralph Records, as the first of three solo albums Frith would record for the label. Gravity has been described as an avant-garde "dance" record that draws on rhythm and dance from folk music across the world.

Gravity was recorded in Sweden, the United States and Switzerland, and featured Frith backed by Swedish Rock in Opposition group Samla Mammas Manna on the first side of the LP and by American progressive rock group the Muffins on the second side. Additional musicians included Marc Hollander of Aksak Maboul and Frith's former Henry Cow bandmate Chris Cutler.

== Background ==
Frith was a classically-trained violinist who turned to playing blues guitar while at school. In 1967 he went to Cambridge University, where he and fellow student Tim Hodgkinson formed Henry Cow. Frith and Hodgkinson remained with various incarnations of the band until it disbanded in 1978. After the release of Henry Cow's Unrest in May 1974, Frith recorded his debut solo album, Guitar Solos, which featured unaccompanied improvisations on prepared guitars. Guitar Solos was well received by music critics, and was voted one of the best albums of 1974 by NME.

During the recording of Henry Cow's Western Culture in January 1978, musical differences arose within the group over the prevalence of song-oriented material on the album. Some wanted purely instrumental compositions, while others, including Frith, favoured songs. As a compromise, Frith and drummer Chris Cutler released the songs on the album Hopes and Fears as Art Bears, while the instrumental tracks became Western Culture. Art Bears went on to make two more albums.

Frith moved to New York City in 1979, where he became involved with a number of musical projects, including a new solo album. To make a more "immediate" record after the intensities of Henry Cow and Art Bears, Frith turned his attention to world folk and dance music. In Hopes and Fears he had "rediscovered the joys of song-form", and it was the song "The Dance" that Frith and Cutler wrote for that album that inspired the making of Gravity. Frith said in a BBC interview:

Working on Chris’ words for "The Dance" made me think a lot about dance music and how different it was in different cultures, and how rigid and standardised disco was in comparison, and I just started exploring and mixing stuff together.

Frith said he researched Gravity on and off for about two years. He had been listening to music from other cultures, particularly Eastern Europe since the mid-1970s. He made no attempt to notate what he heard, but absorbed it and let it find its way later into his own music. On Gravity Frith incorporated elements of this music into his songs, in particular "that contradiction between a kind of seriousness ... and a sense of celebration." He stated, "I didn't ever try to reproduce the ethnic music of anywhere; that would be a singularly pointless exercise ... My intention was to draw on ethnic music and other sources to try to revitalize my approach, to explore new forms."

Frith noted that people used to joke about Henry Cow's music, that you could not dance to it. He found it amusing that with Gravity he had created an album of "dance music", although not the traditional Western dance music in 4/4 with an "enormous beat".

== Recording ==
Gravity was the first of a series of projects Frith would record for the Residents' label Ralph Records. He had recorded with the Residents in the late 1970s and early 1980s, and appeared on several of their albums.

Frith used two backing bands for Gravity, Swedish Rock in Opposition group Samla Mammas Manna and American progressive rock group the Muffins. He recorded side one of the LP record with Samla Mammas Manna at Norrgården Nyvla in Uppsala, Sweden, with additional recording at Sunrise Studios in Kirchberg, Switzerland in August 1979. Side two of the LP was recorded with the Muffins at Catch-a-Buzz Studio in Rockville, Maryland, in November 1979, with additional recording at Sunrise in January 1980. Frith recorded two additional tracks with the Muffins, "Vanity, Vanity" and "Dancing in Sunrise, Switzerland", but they were omitted from the album due to space constraints. They appeared later on the Muffins's 1985 album Open City.

Many of the tracks on Gravity consist of melodic lines woven into complex rhythmic structures taken from different folk music cultures. The time signatures are not the standard 3/4 or 4/4, but more complex signatures like 15/8. Frith described in an interview how he arrived in Uppsala with his carefully written music sheets, only to find that Samla Mammas Manna could not read music. But when he played the music to them, he was "stunned by their ability to hear the details, especially the rhythmic details, that I had written."

In 1980 Ralph Records also released a single from the album, "Dancing in the Street" b/w "What a Dilemma".

== Title ==
"[Dance is] the victory over gravity, over all that weighs down and oppresses, the change of body into spirit, the elevation of creature into creator, the merging with the infinite, the divine."

— Musicologist Curt Sachs, 1937.

The title of the album came from a 1937 quote by Curt Sachs (printed on the back of the album sleeve) in which he described dance as "the victory over gravity".

In his 2019 book Henry Cow: The World Is a Problem, Benjamin Piekut called the title "brilliant". He wrote that after Frith's experiences with Henry Cow's restrictive way of conducting themselves, which Piekut called, "clumsy, slow, inefficient, and inconclusive", the title Gravity refers to the "carefree music therein as well as the ponderous concerns of [Frith's former band] reflected in its rearview mirror."

== Music ==
Frith called Gravity a "dance album", not in the disco/funk sense of its day, but a collection of "dance music" drawn from cultures around the world. The album features an array of rock, folk and jazz instruments, plus field recordings, clapping and "whirling", and has been described as a "musical hybridization" of "Latin percussion, calypso festivity, eastern-tinged percussion [and] Klezmer-like celebration".

"The Boy Beats the Rams" opens Gravity with a burst of laughter followed by some tap dancing, "random" percussion and Frith's "distinctive keening" violin. On "Spring Any Day Now" Frith mixes a bossa nova rhythm with a North African melody. "Don't Cry for Me" features Greek mandolin with heavy metal guitar. "Hands of the Juggler" draws on Middle Eastern folk dance, "Slap Dance" is a Serbian "folk romp", and "Career in Real Estate" is in the tradition of a Scottish fiddle tune.

"Don't Cry for Me"
30 second sample of "Don't Cry for Me"

Frith explained that "Don't Cry for Me" is a hybrid of Greek music, Latin American rhythms and a Caribbean beat. He said, "It has a very strong dancing rhythm, and then every five-and-a-half bars or so the beat changes, leaving you wrong-footed, as it were. You have to readjust, and by the time you've readjusted you have to readjust again. It goes around in a circle like that, all the way through. Fun to watch in discos, not that it'll ever be played in them!"

"Dancing in the Street" is a "de/reconstruction" of Martha and the Vandellas's 1964 hit that includes a "bizarrely harmonised guitar" playing the song's melody over a "boiling mass of feedback" and tape manipulation. According to the album's sleeve notes, this track also includes a recording of "Iranian demonstrators celebrating the capture of American hostages".

"Crack in the Concrete" features an e-bowed guitar over "edgy, dissonant chords" and a "massed kazoo choir of horns" that presages Frith's experimental rock band Massacre he formed in New York City in February 1980. "Norrgården Nyvla" flows into "Year of the Monkey" which ends with a brief sample of the 13th Puerto Rico Summertime Band, "ten seconds of the real thing" according to the LP liner notes.

== Critical reception ==
=== Contemporary reviews ===
In a 1980 review in Sounds magazine, John Gill described Gravity as an album of "wonderfully stateless music", a blend of jazz, rock'n'roll, chamber, European ethnic, and New York City soul and Hispanic. With a reference to Frith's former bands, Henry Cow and Art Bears, Gill added "[a]nd this time, folks, you can dance to it!"^{[italics in the source]} John Diliberto called Gravity "a whirlwind flight across a cultural landscape where features run into each other with a rush". Writing in a 1981 review in Audio magazine, Diliberto said the album's mood and tempo changes constantly: "a quaint bar mitzvah [becomes] a Middle Eastern waltz"; a climax of "fuzzed" guitars switches to a "light-hearted horse and buggy romp". Diliberto stated that with Henry Cow and Art Bears, Frith's guitar work was "barely traditional", but on his solo albums, it was "totally anarchic", and Gravity was no exception. Bill Milkowski wrote in the January 1983 edition of DownBeat magazine that in contrast to Art Bears's "bleak attitude", Frith's Gravity is a "truly joyous solo LP ... an extremely warm, almost whimsical album".

=== Retrospective assessments ===
Professional ratings
Review scores
Source	Rating
AllMusic	4/5 stars

Thomas Schulte at AllMusic described Gravity as an "entertaining and multicultural pocket folk festival" and said it was "one of the most important guitar-based, experimental guitar titles from the avant-guitarist". In a BBC Online review of Gravity, Peter Marsh called it "absolutely essential", adding that it "manages to be wildly eclectic yet avoids incoherence". Brandon Wu of Ground and Sky said that despite his "relative indifference" to the album, one of Gravity's great strengths is that it is both accessible and avant-garde.

Nicole V. Gagné wrote in her 1990 book, Sonic Transports: New Frontiers in Our Music that Frith's laughter at the beginning of Gravity permeates the rest of the album. She said the dance music from around the world has "the delight and discovery and fun and energy which dancing releases". Gagné described Frith's cover of "Dancing in the Street" as "a loving stab at American pop", adding that what makes it "uniquely wild" is the way the blend of rock music and tape noise "taps into the charm and exuberance of the song". Gagné called the climax in "The Hands of the Juggler" "one of the high moments of the entire album" that "goes beyond any cultural allusion; it's a celebration of a spirit, a release into the Folk."

== Influence ==
Gravity inspired a 2003 album Spring Any Day Now by David Greenberg and David McGuinness with the Concerto Caledonia. Subtitled "Music of 18th century Scotland and elsewhere", the album includes covers of two tracks from Gravity, "Spring Any Day Now" and "Norrgården Nyvla", plus a track from Frank Zappa's Roxy & Elsewhere (1974), "Echidna's Arf (of You)".

Frith continued his exploration of folk and dance music on his next album for Ralph Records, Speechless (1981). As with Gravity, he recorded Speechless with two bands, French Rock in Opposition group Etron Fou Leloublan on one side of the LP, and Frith's New York City group Massacre on the other. The album included extensive tape manipulation, which was an ongoing passion of Frith's at the time.

== Live performances ==
In August 2012 Frith led a performance of Gravity in San Francisco, California entitled "Fred Frith and Friends play Gravity". The performers were Frith, Dominique Leone, Jon Leidecker (Wobbly), Aaron Novik, Ava Mendoza, Jordan Glenn, Kasey Knudsen, Lisa Mezzacappa and Marië Abe. Frith led two more performances of Gravity at Roulette in Brooklyn, New York City on 19 and 20 September 2013, featuring Frith (guitar/electric bass), Leone (keyboards), Leidecker (sampling), Novik (clarinet/bass clarinet), Mendoza (guitar), Abe (accordion), Glenn (drums), Knudsen (alto saxophone), Mezzacappa (bass), Kaethe Hostetter (violin), and William Winant (percussion).

Frith formed the Gravity Band in 2014, comprising Frith (conductor/guitar/bass), Hostetter (violin), Knudsen (saxophone), Novik (clarinet), Abe (accordion), Leidecker (samples), Leone (keyboards), Mendoza (guitar), Mezzacappa (bass), Glenn (drums), Winant (percussion), and Myles Boisen (sound). They performed the album live at the 30th Festival International de Musique Actuelle de Victoriaville in Canada in May 2014, at the Music Meeting in Nijmegen, Netherlands in June 2014, and at the Moers Festival in Germany, also in June 2014.

== Track listing ==
All tracks composed by Fred Frith except where noted.

=== Original 1980 release ===
Side one
No.	Title	Length
1.	"The Boy Beats the Rams (Kluk Tluce Berany)"	4:54
2.	"Spring Any Day Now"	3:04
3.	"Don't Cry for Me"	3:28
4.	"The Hands of the Juggler"	5:31
5.	"Norrgården Nyvla"	2:54
6.	"Year of the Monkey"	4:11

Side two
No.	Title	Length
7.	"What a Dilemma"	3:11
8.	"Crack in the Concrete"	1:24
9.	"Come Across"	2:47
10.	"Dancing in the Street" (Gaye, Stevenson, Hunter)	3:20
11.	"My Enemy Is a Bad Man"	1:22
12.	"Slap Dance"	2:32
13.	"A Career in Real Estate"	4:42
14.	"Dancing in Rockville Maryland"	3:04

=== 1990 CD re-issue bonus tracks ===
No.	Title	Length
15.	"Waking Against Sleep"	2:08
16.	"Terrain"	3:50
17.	"Moeris Dancing"	5:03
18.	"Geistige Nacht"	5:18
19.	"Life at the Top"	1:40
20.	"Oh Wie Schon Ist Panama!"	5:02

== Personnel ==
=== Side one ===
- Fred Frith – guitar, bass guitar, violin, percussion
- Samla Mammas Manna:
  - Lars Hollmer – piano, organ, accordion
  - Hans Bruniusson – drums
  - Eino Haapala – guitar, mandolin
- Marc Hollander – alto saxophone, clarinet

==== Guests ====
- Olivia Bruynhooghe – tap dancing, clapping
- Chris Cutler – snare drum and maracas (track 3), clapping
- Tina Curran – whirling, clapping
- Catherine Jauniaux – whirling, clapping
- Frank Wuyts – recorders (track 6), whirling, clapping
- Michel Berckmans – clapping
- Etienne Conod – clapping
- Denis van Hecke – clapping
- Veronique Vincent – clapping

==== Recording and production ====
Recorded at Norrgården Nyvla in Uppsala, Sweden and at Sunrise Studios, Kirchberg, Switzerland in August 1979.

- Gabriel Rosen – engineer (Sweden)
- Etienne Conod – engineer (Switzerland)

=== Side two ===
- Fred Frith – guitar, bass guitar, violin, keyboards, drums (tracks 7, 11, 13)
- The Muffins:
  - Dave Newhouse – alto saxophone, organ (track 10)
  - Thomas Scott – soprano saxophone (track 12)
  - Paul Sears – drums (tracks 7, 8, 10, 12, 14)
  - Billy Swann – bass guitar (tracks 8, 10, 12, 14)
- Marc Hollander – alto saxophone, bass clarinet

==== Guests ====
- Hans Bruniusson – drums (track 10)
- Tina Curran – bass guitar (track 7)
- Frank Wuyts – drums (track 9)

==== Recording and production ====
Recorded at Catch-a-Buzz Studio, Rockville, Maryland, United States in November 1979 and at Sunrise Studios, Kirchberg, Switzerland in January 1980.

- Thomas Scott and Colleen Scott – engineers (USA)
- Etienne Conod – engineer (Switzerland)

=== Bonus tracks on 1990 CD re-issue ===
- Fred Frith – bass guitar, guitar, violin, keyboards, drums, percussion
- Marc Hollander – soprano saxophone (track 18)
- Chris Cutler – drums (tracks 15–18)
- Frank Wuyts – synthesiser (track 18)
- Michel Berckmans – oboe, bassoon (track 18)
- Denis van Hecke – cello (track 18)
- Lindsay Cooper – bassoon, oboe (tracks 15, 16)
- Tim Hodgkinson – alto saxophone (track 15)
- Annemarie Roelofs – trombone (track 15)
- Dagmar Krause – vocals (track 17)
- Tom Cora – bass guitar, percussion (track 19)

==== Recording ====
- Track 15 recorded at Sunrise Studios, Kirchberg, Switzerland in July–August 1978, previously unreleased (an outtake from the Henry Cow Western Culture recording sessions)
- Track 16 recorded at Kaleidophon, London in March 1978, originally released on Hopes and Fears (1978) by Art Bears, credited here to Henry Cow
- Track 17 recorded at Sunrise Studios, Kirchberg, Switzerland in January 1978, originally released on Hopes and Fears (1978) by Art Bears, credited here to Henry Cow
- Track 18 recorded at Sunrise Studios, Kirchberg, Switzerland in January 1979, originally released on Un Peu de l'Âme des Bandits (1980) by Aksak Maboul
- Track 19 recorded at Sunrise Studios, Kirchberg, Switzerland in January 1984, originally released on Learn to Talk (1984) by Skeleton Crew
- Track 20 recorded at Noise, New York City in September 1988, previously unreleased

=== Artwork ===
- Alfreda Benge – cover artwork

== CD reissues ==
In 1990 East Side Digital Records and RecRec Music re-issued Gravity on CD with six bonus tracks. In 2002 Fred Records issued a remastered version of the original Gravity with no bonus tracks.

== Works cited ==
- Diliberto, John (September 1981). "Record Reviews". Audio. Vol. 65, no. 9. CBS Publications. pp. 76, 78. ISSN 0004-752X.
- Gagné, Nicole V. (1990). Sonic Transports: New Frontiers in Our Music. De Falco Books. ISBN 978-0-9625145-0-0.
- Milkowski, Bill (1983). "The Frith Factor: Exploration in Sound". DownBeat. Vol. 50, no. 1. Maher Publications. pp. 22–25, 61. ISSN 0012-5768.
- Piekut, Benjamin (2019). Henry Cow: The World Is a Problem. Duke University Press. ISBN 978-1-47800-405-9.
