= Hallelujah, Anyway – Remembering Tom Cora =

Compilation album by various artists
- Released: May 1999
- Recorded: 1981–1998
- Genre: Avant-garde jazz, experimental music, free improvisation
- Length: 144:27
- Label: Tzadik
- Producer: Fred Frith and Peter Hardt

Hallelujah, Anyway – Remembering Tom Cora is a 1999 double-CD compilation album by various artists dedicated to United States cellist and composer Tom Cora, who had died on April 9, 1998. It includes material composed in Cora's memory, songs he had written for other musicians and groups, and a selection of music he had performed and participated in. It was released in May 1999 by John Zorn's Tzadik Records.

One of the tracks, "Talking to the Tree", was performed at Cora's Memorial Concert in May 1998 by Cora's widow, Catherine Jauniaux, and one of his frequent collaborators, Fred Frith.

== Reception ==
Professional ratings
Review scores
Source	Rating
AllMusic	5/5 stars

Writing in a review at AllMusic, Joslyn Layne described this retrospective compilation as "[u]pbeat, eclectic, eccentric, beautiful". She called Tom Cora "a significant improviser and extraordinary cellist", and said this release was important because it highlighted Cora's "undervalued brilliance". Layne called the album "a worthy eulogy" and "[h]ighly recommended for all with open ears".

Andrew Bartlett said in a review of Hallelujah, Anyway in the Seattle Weekly that it is an "eminently memorable" collection of tributes to Cora, who he said had taken his cello to "untold new places". Bartlett said "[y]ou won't find a better collection of post-1970s avant-garde guiding lights collected anywhere".

== Track listing ==
Disc 1
No.	Title	Writer(s)	Performer	Length
1.	"Cuimhnean Phiobair"	Seán Potts	Lesli Dalaba	1:47
2.	"The Gospel of Gone"	Tom Cora	Kazutoki Umezu & band	3:21
3.	"Halts"	Roof, Paul Haines	Roof	5:11
4.	"Talking to the Tree"	Fred Frith, Catherine Jauniaux	Fred Frith / Catherine Jauniaux	2:58
5.	"Saint Dog"	Cora	Curlew	6:55
6.	"Seafaring"	Amy Denio, Jeroen Visser	Amy Denio / Jeroen Visser	4:50
7.	"Two-Day 'Til Tomorrow"	Cora	Tom Cora	1:14
8.	"In Memory Of"	Haruna Ito, Samm Bennett	Gonogonogo	4:36
9.	"Jim"	Cora	The Ululating Mummies	3:48
10.	"Just a Dream"	John Edwards, Caroline Kraabel	Shock Exchange	3:23
11.	"Today"	George Cartwright	Chris Cochrane / Zeena Parkins	2:16
12.	"Marseille Shout"	Oriental Fusion	Oriental Fusion	4:02
13.	"Love, Love, Love"	Wayne Horvitz	Wayne Horvitz	2:16
14.	"Casey R."	Cora, Frith, John Zorn	Tom Cora / Fred Frith / John Zorn	3:29
15.	"Weaklings"	Third Person	Third Person	3:53
16.	"Der Glater Bulgar"	Dave Tarras	A-Musik	5:06
17.	"The President of the United States"	Cora, Wadada Leo Smith, Richard Teitelbaum, Carlos Zingaro	Tom Cora / Wadada Leo Smith / Richard Teitelbaum / Carlos Zingaro	3:16
18.	"Light Sentence"	Cora	Curlew	2:35
19.	"The Week Tom Died"	Thierry Azam	Thierry Azam	5:00
20.	"There Will Be a Happy Meeting"	Traditional	Tom Cora	2:53

Disc 2
No.	Title	Writer(s)	Performer	Length
21.	"The Flute's Tale"	The Ex, Cora	The Ex	4:38
22.	"Burning Hoop"	Cora	Tom Cora	3:01
23.	"Pitter Patter Panther"	The Chadbournes	The Chadbournes	2:16
24.	"Tomcat"	Miya Masaoka, Larry Ochs, Bob Ostertag	Miya Masaoka / Larry Ochs / Bob Ostertag	5:08
25.	"Tom Wood"	Gerry Hemingway	Gerry Hemingway	4:42
26.	"Mr. TC"	Elliott Sharp / Frances-Marie Uitti	Elliott Sharp / Frances-Marie Uitti	5:24
27.	"Jelly Roll Stomp"	Jelly Roll Morton	Skeleton Crew	3:12
28.	"Fence"	Zeena Parkins	Zeena Parkins	1:54
29.	"Vepiranka"	Cora, Iva Bittová	Tom Cora / Iva Bittová	3:24
30.	"Intenda"	Cora	Nimal	5:00
31.	"Tromba Marina a Cora"	Nicolas Collins	Nicolas Collins	2:10
32.	"Hoppas Att Det Går / Total Preparation"	Lars Hollmer, Cora, Pidgin Combo	Pidgin Combo	5:09
33.	"Yellow Smile"	Hahn Rowe	Hahn Rowe	3:12
34.	"Two Days 'Til Tomorrow"	Cora	Tom Cora / Wolfgang Mitterer	5:09
35.	"Jesus Speak to Me"	Traditional	Tyson Rogers	1:27
36.	"Radiotraces"	Cora, Thomas Dimuzio	Thomas Dimuzio	5:12
37.	"One More Time"	Cora, Chris Cutler, Frith	Tom Cora / Chris Cutler / Fred Frith	3:12
38.	"Tom's Lament"	Kramer	Kramer & Tess	4:24
39.	"Zach's Flag"	Cora	Skeleton Crew	3:04

Sources: AllMusic, Discogs, Tom Cora discography.

== Personnel ==
- Tom Cora (3,5,7,12,14,15,17,18,20–23,27,29,30,32,34,37,39) – cello, accordions, home-made instruments, voice
- Lesli Dalaba (1) – trumpet
- Kazutoki Umezu (2) – alto saxophone
- Nakao Kanji (2) – soprano saxophone
- Hayashi Eiichi (2) – alto saxophone
- Tada Yoko (2) – alto saxophone
- Katayama Hiroaki (2) – tenor saxophone
- Nomoto Kazuhiro (2) – baritone saxophone
- Shimizu Kazuto (2) – bass clarinet
- Ohara Yutaka (2) – trombone
- Sekijima Takerou (2) – tuba
- Kondo Tatsuo (2) – accordion
- Keichi (2) – percussion
- Phil Minton (3) – voice
- Luc Ex (3,21) – bass guitar
- Michael Vatcher (3) – drums
- Fred Frith (4,14,18,27,37,39) – guitar, home-made instruments, bass guitar
- Catherine Jauniaux (4) – voice
- Pippin Barnett (5,9) – drums
- George Cartwright (5,18) – saxophones
- Ann Rupel (5) – bass guitar
- Davey Williams (5) – guitar
- Amy Denio (6) – voice, percussion, guitar, alto, piano innards, text
- Jeroen Visser (6) – collage, mastering
- Samm Bennett (8,15) – drums, samples
- Ito Haruna (8)
- Barry Bless (9) – accordion
- Danny Finny (9) – tenor saxophone
- Robbie Kinter (9) – percussion, keyboard
- George Lowe (9) – bass clarinet
- Dave Yohe (9) – bass guitar
- Caroline Kraabel (10) – saxophone
- John Edwards (10) – bass guitar
- Chris Cochrane (11) – voice
- Zeena Parkins (11,27,28) – piano
- Hakim Hamadouche (12) – lute, voice
- Edmond Hosdikian (12) – alto saxophone
- Barre Phillips (12) – bass guitar
- Ahmed Compaore (12) – drums
- Wayne Horvitz (13) – piano
- John Zorn (14,23) – alto saxophone, game calls, mouthpieces, soprano saxophone, clarinet
- Marc Ribot (15) – guitar
- Takeda Kenichi (16) – taishokoto
- Okuma Wataru (16,32) – clarinet, chorus, piano
- Iwate Hiroshi (16) – saxophone
- Chino Shuichi (16) – keyboard
- Koyama Tetsuto (16) – bass guitar
- Nakao Kanji (16) – drums
- Kasuga Hirobumi (16) – guitar
- Leo Smith (17) – trumpet, small instruments
- Richard Teitelbaum (17) – synthesizer
- Carlos Zingaro (17) – violin
- Mark Howell (18) – guitar
- Rick Brown (18) – drums
- Thierry Azam (19) – all instruments
- Terrie Ex (21) – guitar
- Andy Ex (21) – guitar
- Katrin Ex (21) – drums
- G.W. Sok (21) – vocals
- Eugene Chadbourne (23) – guitar, voice, tape effects
- David Licht (23) – drums
- Kramer (23,38) – cheap organ, voice, all instruments (on (38))
- Miya Masaoka (24) – koto
- Larry Ochs (24) – tenor saxophone
- Bob Ostertag (24) – samples
- Gerry Hemingway (25) – percussion
- Elliott Sharp (26) – guitar
- Frances-Marie Uitti (26) – cello
- Sara Parkins (28) – violin
- Margaret Parkins (28) – cello
- Iva Bittová (29) – violin, voice
- Momo Rossel (30) – guitar
- Bratko Bibič (30) – accordion
- Jean-Vin Huguenin (30) – bass guitar
- Nicolas Collins (31) – backwards electric guitar
- Rorie (32) – chorus, marimba
- Kimura Shinya (32) – drums
- Shinoda Masami (32) – baritone saxophone
- Nishimura Takuya (32) – bass guitar
- Hahn Rowe (33) – all instruments
- Wolfgang Mitterer (34) – piano, prepared piano
- Tyson Rogers (35) – piano
- Thomas Dimuzio (36) – digital editing and processing
- Chris Cutler (37) – drums, processing
- Tess (38) – voice
- Rebby Sharp (39) – fiddle

Sources: Discogs, Tom Cora discography.

== Recording notes ==
- (1) recorded at the corner church, June 1998
- (2) recorded on the street in Tokyo, September 1998
- (3) recorded at Lagerhaus, Bremen, June 1997
- (4) recorded at the Tom Cora Memorial Concert, May 1998
- (5) recorded at Water Music, Hoboken, November 1990
- (6) recorded at Fish Made Studio, Zürich and Bendy Thing & Spaciouser Spoot Studios, Seattle
- (7,18) recorded at Bisi Studio, Brooklyn, Summer 1983
- (8) recorded at Mescaluna, Nishinomiya & Polarity, Tokyo, November 1998
- (9) recorded at Sound of Music Studios, Richmond (VA)
- (11) recorded at Noise, New York, 1987
- (12) recorded at Studio Cactus, Marseille, September 1997
- (13) recorded at Ironwood Studios, Seattle, November 1998
- (14) recorded at WKCR-FM, New York, April 1983
- (15) recorded live at the Knitting Factory, New York City, 1990
- (16) recorded at G.O.K. Sound, Tokyo, Summer 1995
- (17) recorded live at Bard College, May 1993
- (19) recorded at Thierry Azam's home, April 1998
- (20,22) recorded at Harold Dessau Studio, New York, 1990
- (21) recorded live on VPRO Radio 3, La Stampa, August 1991
- (23) recorded live in Ohio, c. 1981
- (24) recorded at Division Studio, San Francisco, September 1998
- (25) recorded at Roulette, New York City, November 1998
- (26) recorded live in Amsterdam, 1998
- (27) recorded at CBGB's, New York City, April 1985
- (28) recorded at 6/8 Studios, New York, February 1997
- (29) recorded at Studio V-Zlin, May 1997
- (30) recorded at Studio CCAM, Vand'Oeuvre-les-Nancy, 1989
- (32) recorded at Manda-la 2, Tokyo, March 1989
- (33) recorded 1998
- (34) recorded 1996–1998
- (35) recorded June 1998
- (37) recorded live at Laboratoires d'Aubervilliers, March 1998
- (38) recorded at Virginia's, 1998
- (39) recorded at Sunrise, Switzerland, Christmas 1983

Sources: Discogs, Tom Cora discography.
