= Learn to Talk / Country of Blinds =

Compilation album by Skeleton Crew
- Released: 1990
- Recorded: Studio tracks: Switzerland, December 1983 – January 1984; December 1985 – January 1986
- Genre: Avant-rock; experimental
- Length: 75:11
- Label: RecRec Music (Switzerland)
- Producer: Skeleton Crew; Robert Vogel; Tim Hodgkinson

Skeleton Crew chronology
The Country of Blinds (1986)	Learn to Talk / Country of Blinds (1990)	Etymology (1997)

Professional ratings
Review scores
Source	Rating
Dusted	favourable

Learn to Talk / Country of Blinds is a CD compilation album by American experimental rock and jazz band Skeleton Crew. It was released by RecRec Music in 1990 and comprises the band's two studio albums, Learn to Talk and The Country of Blinds, with two tracks omitted from the former album, and one track omitted from the latter.

In 2005 Fred Records reissued the compilation on a double CD, omitting only one track from The Country of Blinds, and adding ten live tracks taken from the band's North American and European tours, nine of which were previously unreleased. This reissue was dedicated by Fred Frith to Tom Cora, who died in 1998: "Dedicated to the memory of Tom Cora – dear friend, master musician and enthusiastic co-conspirator."

== Track listing ==
=== RecRec Music single-CD (1990) ===
No.	Title	Writer(s)	Length
1.	"Que Viva"	Cora, Frith	3:40
2.	"Onwards and Upwards"	Cora, Frith	3:39
3.	"The Way Things Fall (Back Apart)"	Cora, Frith, Rebby Sharp	2:35
4.	"Not My Shoes"	Cora, Frith	2:14
5.	"The Washington Post"	Sousa, arr. Skeleton Crew	1:28
6.	"We're Still Free"	Cora, Frith	4:16
7.	"Victoryville"	Cora, Frith	2:43
8.	"Learn to Talk"	Cora, Frith	3:40
9.	"Factory Song"	Cora, Frith	5:13
10.	"It's Fine"	Cora, Frith	4:22
11.	"Zach's Flag"	Cora	3:10
12.	"The Country of Blinds"	Skeleton Crew, Cora	4:10
13.	"The Border"	Skeleton Crew, Anne Hemenway	3:28
14.	"The Hand that Bites"	Skeleton Crew, Frith	5:32
15.	"Dead Sheep"	Skeleton Crew, Cora, Frith	3:22
16.	"Bingo"	Skeleton Crew, Frith	3:34
17.	"Man or Monkey"	Skeleton Crew, Cutler	2:37
18.	"Foot in Hole"	Skeleton Crew	3:08
19.	"Hot Field"	Skeleton Crew	2:36
20.	"The Birds of Japan"	Skeleton Crew, Frith	4:00
21.	"You May Find a Bed"	Skeleton Crew, Frith, Sharp	6:10

- Tracks 1–11 are from the original Learn to Talk album
- Tracks 12–21 are from the original The Country of Blinds album

=== Fred Records double-CD (2005) ===
Disc 1: Learn to Talk
No.	Title	Writer(s)	Length
1.	"Que Viva"	Cora, Frith	3:40
2.	"Onwards and Upwards"	Cora, Frith	3:39
3.	"The Way Things Fall (Back Apart)"	Cora, Frith, Rebby Sharp	2:35
4.	"Not My Shoes"	Cora, Frith	2:14
5.	"The Washington Post"	Sousa, arr. Skeleton Crew	1:28
6.	"We're Still Free"	Cora, Frith	4:16
7.	"Victoryville"	Cora, Frith	2:43
8.	"Los Colitos"	trad. Ecuador, Cora, Frith	2:53
9.	"Life at the Top"	Frith	1:44
10.	"Learn to Talk"	Cora, Frith	3:40
11.	"Factory Song"	Cora, Frith	5:13
12.	"It's Fine"	Cora, Frith	4:22
13.	"Zach's Flag"	Cora	3:10
14.	"Sick as a Parrot"	Cora, Frith	2:57
15.	"Automatic Pilot"	Cora, Frith	1:28
16.	"Hook"	Frith	2:14
17.	"Killing Time"	Frith/Lasswell/Maher	2:27

- Tracks 1–13 are from the original Learn to Talk album
- Track 17 was previously released on Passed Normal Vol. 4 (1991) by various artists

Disc 2: The Country of Blinds
No.	Title	Writer(s)	Length
1.	"The Country of Blinds"	Skeleton Crew, Cora	4:10
2.	"The Border"	Skeleton Crew, Anne Hemenway	3:28
3.	"The Hand that Bites"	Skeleton Crew, Frith	5:32
4.	"Dead Sheep"	Skeleton Crew, Cora, Frith	3:22
5.	"Bingo"	Skeleton Crew, Frith	3:34
6.	"Man or Monkey"	Skeleton Crew, Cutler	2:37
7.	"Foot in Hole"	Skeleton Crew	3:08
8.	"Hot Field"	Skeleton Crew	2:36
9.	"The Birds of Japan"	Skeleton Crew, Frith	4:00
10.	"You May Find a Bed"	Skeleton Crew, Frith, Rebby Sharp	6:10
11.	"Sparrow Song"	Frith	1:29
12.	"Safety in Numbers"	Skeleton Crew	3:18
13.	"Howdywhoola Too"	Cora	2:47
14.	"Second Rate"	Skeleton Crew	5:32
15.	"New Orleans Stomp"	Morton, arr. Skeleton Crew	3:14
16.	"Hasta la Victoria"	Skeleton Crew	3:24

- Tracks 1–10 are from the original The Country of Blinds album
- Track 12 was previously released on A Classic Guide to No Man's Land (1988) by various artists

=== Track notes ===
- "Victoryville" was recorded live in December 1983 at the 1st Festival International de Musique Actuelle de Victoriaville in Victoriaville, Quebec, Canada (additional material from a malfunctioning tape-recorder which played both sides of the tape at once).
- Part of "Learn to Talk" recorded by CKRL in Quebec City.
- "Sick as a Parrot" and "Automatic Pilot" were recorded live in Lyon, France, 1984
- "Hook" was recorded live in Paris, France, 1982, and included Dave Newhouse on alto saxophone and percussion
- "Killing Time" (originally recorded by Massacre in 1981) was recorded live at Illinois State University, Normal, Illinois, November 4, 1984
- "Hot Field" and the last section of "You May Find a Bed" were recorded live in Reykjavík, Iceland, November 4, 1985.
- "Sparrow Song", "Safety in Numbers", "Howdywhoola Too" (cello, sampler and percussion solo by Tom Cora) and "Second Rate" were recorded live on their 1985 European tour
- "New Orleans Stomp" was recorded live at CBGB, New York City, April 1985
- "Hasta la Victoria" was recorded live in Toronto, 1985

== Personnel ==
- Tom Cora – cello, bass guitar, Casio, accordion, drums, contraptions, singing
- Fred Frith – guitar, 6-string bass guitar, violin, Casio, home-mades, drums, singing
- Zeena Parkins – organ, electric harp, accordion, drums, singing
- Dave Newhouse – alto saxophone and percussion on "Hook"

=== Guests ===
- Röbl, Lu and Katrin – voices on "Los Colitos"

=== Sound and production ===
Learn to Talk

- Engineered by Robert Vogel and Fred Frith
- Produced by Robert Vogel and Skeleton Crew

The Country of Blinds

- Engineered by Tim Hodgkinson and Katrina Brändli
- Produced by Tim Hodgkinson

Additional live tracks on Fred Records release

- Archival transfers from cassette to CD by Vance Galloway and Jon Leidecker, September 2000
- Compiled and mastered by Fred Frith and Myles Boisen, January and May 2005
