= Jerry King =

Jerry King may refer to:

- Jerry King (cartoonist)
- Jerry King (musician)
