= Etymology (album) =

Studio album by Skeleton Crew
- Released: 1997
- Recorded: 1995
- Studios: Koeinverhuurbdrijf Studio, Purmerland, The Netherlands
- Genres: Experimental music, free improvisation
- Length: 51:30
- Label: Rarefaction (US)
- Producer: Thomas Dimuzio

Skeleton Crew chronology
Learn to Talk / Country of Blinds (1990)	Etymology (1997)	Free Dirt (Live) (2021)

Etymology is an audio source library recorded in 1995 by Skeleton Crew. It was released by Rarefaction in 1997 in the United States on audio CD and CD-ROM for Macintosh and Windows 95 PCs. The sound files (16-bit AIFF stereo, sampled at 44.1 kHz) are royalty free, and Rarefaction stated that they are free for use in "musical or multimedia project[s]".

== Background ==
Skeleton Crew was an American experimental rock and jazz group formed in 1982. They originally consisted of English guitarist Fred Frith and American cellist Tom Cora, with American harpist and keyboardist Zeena Parkins joining later. Although the group disbanded in 1986, Frith and Cora collaborated again in The Netherlands in 1995 as Skeleton Crew to record Etymology.

Frith later used Cora's cello samples on Etymology in "Traffic Continues II: Gusto", an extended piece Frith composed for Ensemble Modern on their 2000 album, Traffic Continues. Cora had died in 1998, and Frith dedicated "Traffic Continues II: Gusto" to Cora.

== Track listing ==
1. "0dB Test Tone A440" (Frith) – 0:32
2. "Actions (9 samples)" (Frith) – 0:23
3. "Gestures (11 samples)" (Frith) – 1:53
4. "Swells (3 samples)" (Frith) – 1:15
5. "Boiler (3 samples)" (Frith) – 0:42
6. "Caste Rhythm" (Frith) – 0:08
7. "Caste Rhythm Loops (5 samples)" (Frith) – 0:11
8. "Gliss Rhythm" (Frith) – 0:08
9. "Gliss Rhythm Loops (2 samples)" (Frith) – 0:09
10. "Hand Tambour" (Frith) – 0:16
11. "Hand Tambour Loops (9 samples)" (Frith) – 0:24
12. "Livid Gaze" (Frith) – 0:13
13. "Livid Gaze Loops (7 samples)" (Frith) – 0:19
14. "Percolatte" (Frith) – 0:17
15. "Percolatte Loops (7 samples)" (Frith) – 0:23
16. "Pluck Taps" (Frith) – 0:11
17. "Pluck Tap Loops (2 samples)" (Frith) – 0:11
18. "Pouncers (2 samples)" (Frith) – 0:16
19. "Scride" (Frith) – 0:11
20. "Scride Loops (4 samples) " (Frith) – 0:14
21. "Slackedback" (Frith) – 0:17
22. "Slackedback Loops (9 samples)" (Frith) – 0:24
23. "Stap" (Frith) – 0:23
24. "Stap Loops (11 samples)" (Frith) – 0:29
25. "Brush" (Frith) – 0:12
26. "Brush Loops (5 samples) " (Frith) – 0:16
27. "Random (3 samples)" (Frith) – 0:52
28. "Vignettes (6 samples)" (Frith) – 1:55
29. "Armageddon" (Frith) – 0:28
30. "Armageddon Cuts (11 samples)" (Frith) – 0:37
31. "Noxoous" (Frith) – 0:52
32. "Noxous Loops (9 samples)" (Frith) – 0:56
33. "Steamleak" (Frith) – 0:16
34. "Steamleak Loops (13 samples)" (Frith) – 0:28
35. "Tandrum" (Frith) – 0:48
36. "Tandrum Loops (6 samples)" (Frith) – 0:51
37. "4 Questions" (Skeleton Crew) – 0:08
38. "4 Questions Loops (4 samples)" (Skeleton Crew) – 0:11
39. "Complete Sentence" (Skeleton Crew) – 0:15
40. "Phrase Loops (7 samples) " (Skeleton Crew) – 0:23
41. "Data Trash Shuffle" (Skeleton Crew) – 1:26
42. "Data Trash Loops (21 samples)" (Skeleton Crew) – 1:39
43. "Lexical Tantrum" (Skeleton Crew) – 0:18
44. "Lexical Tantrum Loops (8 samples)" (Skeleton Crew) – 0:25
45. "Line and Shine" (Skeleton Crew) – 0:21
46. "Line and Shine Loops (7 samples)" (Skeleton Crew) – 0:26
47. "Parsing Reel" (Skeleton Crew) – 0:33
48. "Parsing Reel Loops (9 samples)" (Skeleton Crew) – 0:41
49. "Phonology" (Skeleton Crew) – 0:18
50. "Phonology Loops (2 samples)" (Skeleton Crew) – 0:18
51. "Whistler's Other" (Skeleton Crew) – 0:49
52. "Whistler's Other Loops (5 samples)" (Skeleton Crew) – 0:53
53. "X-Bar Theory" (Skeleton Crew) – 0:33
54. "X-Bar Theory Loops (11 samples)" (Skeleton Crew) – 0:35
55. "Actions (4 samples)" (Cora) – 0:24
56. "Axons (10 samples)" (Cora) – 0:29
57. "Diphtongs (8 samples)" (Cora) – 0:40
58. "Gyri (4 samples)" (Cora) – 0:32
59. "Neural Chumps (7 samples)" (Cora) – 0:27
60. "Scritch (5 samples)" (Cora) – 0:20
61. "Snattre (5 samples)" (Cora) – 0:21
62. "Adage A" (Cora) – 0:52
63. "Adage A Cuts (9 samples)" (Cora) – 1:00
64. "Adage B" (Cora) – 0:28
65. "Adage B Cuts (6 samples)" (Cora) – 0:33
66. "Adage C" (Cora) – 0:36
67. "Adage C Cuts (12 samples)" (Cora) – 0:47
68. "Adage Coda" (Cora) – 0:25
69. "Adage Coda Cuts (13 samples)" (Cora) – 0:37
70. "Adage D" (Cora) – 0:22
71. "Adage D Cuts (7 samples)" (Cora) – 0:28
72. "Laryngio (5 samples)" (Cora) – 0:27
73. "Patterns (8 samples)" (Cora) – 0:38
74. "Statements (4 samples)" (Cora) – 0:41
75. "Quarter Loner (2 samples)" (Cora) – 0:56
76. "Bassis (10 samples)" (Cora) – 0:53
77. "The Bends 1 (10 samples)" (Cora) – 0:38
78. "The Bends 2 (11 samples)" (Cora) – 0:47
79. "Crackles & Rips (11 samples)" (Cora) – 0:26
80. "Creaks (4 samples)" (Cora) – 0:09
81. "Friction (10 samples)" (Cora) – 0:31
82. "Industrial (3 samples)" (Cora) – 0:14
83. "Scrapes (4 samples)" (Cora) – 0:24
84. "Scrawls/Scratches (13 samples)" (Cora) – 0:43
85. "Percussive (14 samples)" (Cora) – 0:24
86. "Bounces (4 samples)" (Cora) – 0:20
87. "Chordal (9 samples)" (Cora) – 0:28
88. "Flutterance (10 samples)" (Cora) – 0:37
89. "Tonal (21 samples)" (Cora) – 1:16
90. "Vox-like (10 samples)" (Cora) – 0:22
91. "Dissonance (7 samples)" (Cora) – 0:25
92. "High (4 samples)" (Cora) – 0:18
93. "Metallic (12 samples)" (Cora) – 0:39
94. "Rosin Haw (12 samples)" (Cora) – 0:36
95. "Overtones (12 samples)" (Cora) – 0:40

Source: Etymology liner notes, Fred Frith discography.

== Personnel ==
- Fred Frith (tracks 1–54) – guitar, electromagnetic translations
- Tom Cora (tracks 37–95) – cello, cello resonated objects

Source: Discogs, Fred Frith discography.

== Sound and artwork ==
Recorded at Koeinverhuurbdrijf Studio, Purmerland, The Netherlands in 1995

- Dolph – recording engineer
- Thomas Dimuzio – producer (cutting, looping and editing)
- Peter Baeder – cover artist

Source: Etymology liner notes, Fred Frith discography.
