= No Man's Land (record label) =

No Man's Land was a German record label based in Würzburg, Germany. Formed in 1984, it ceased trading in 1997. The label was run by its proprietors in combination with the music publishing and record label Review Records and the distribution company Recommended No Man's Land. The latter was part of the network of distributors associated with the British record label and distributor, Recommended Records. No Man's Land specialised in releases by experimental jazz and avant-garde artists.

== Discography ==
- nml 8401 The Romans – You Only Live Once
- nml 8502 Doctor Nerve – Out to Bomb Fresh Kings
- nml 8503 Lindsay Cooper – Music for Other Occasions
- nml 8505 :zoviet-france: – [GRIS]
- nml 8506 Jad Fair – Best Wishes
- nml 8506b Jad Fair – Best Wishes Booklet
- nml 8604 Meltable Snaps It – Points Blank
- nml 8608 Orthotonics – Luminous Bipeds
- nml 8609 Skeleton Crew – The Country of Blinds
- nml 8707D various artists Island of Sanity: New Music from New York City
- nml 8710 Tom Cora – Live at the Western Front
- nml 8712 Zeena Parkins – Something Out There
- nml 8811 Geoff Leigh / Frank Wuyts – From Here to Drums
- nml 8813 various artists – A Classic Guide to No Man's Land
- nml 8814 Non Credo – Reluctant Hosts
- nml 8815 Half Japanese – Charmed Life
- nml 8816 Christian Marclay – More Encores
- nml 8917 Half Japanese – The Band That Would Be King
- nml 9319 François Ribac / Eva Schwabe – Opéra
- nml 9420 Sugarconnection – Plays Alien Cakes
- nml 9825 Dawn – Dusk
- nml/D 873 Kinothek Percussion Ensemble – Industry!
- nml/GRRR 2012 Un Drame Musical Instantané – Urgent Meeting
