= Emmanuelle Vo-Dinh =

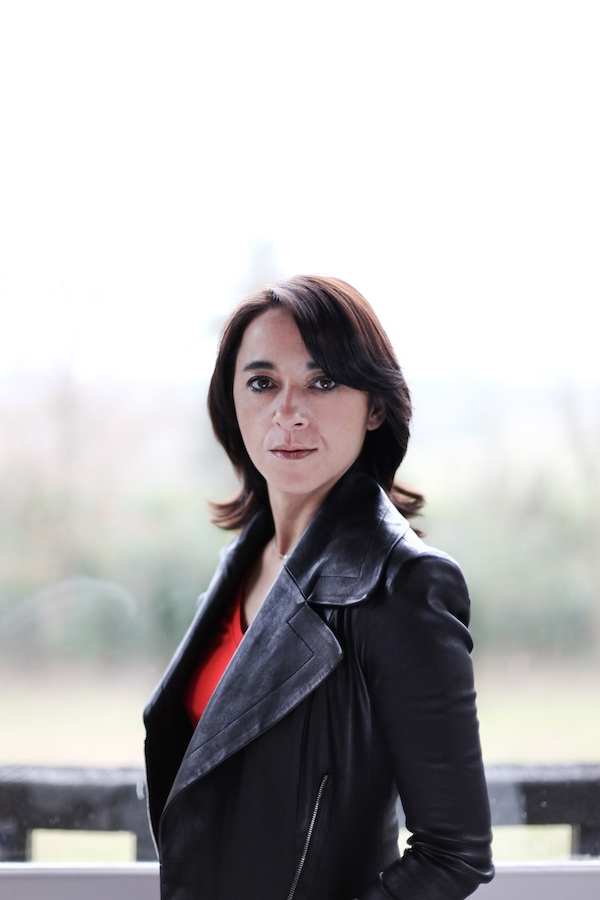
Emmanuelle Vo-Dinh

Emmanuelle Vo-Dinh is a choreographer and director of Le Phare, Centre Chorégraphique National du Havre Haute-Normandie.

== Biography ==
After training to be a ballet dancer and also exploring the American dance tradition, Vo-Dinh expanded her learning experience at the Merce Cunningham School in New York. Back in France, she danced with François Raffinot from 1991 to 1996. In 1997, she founded the Sui Generis company. She was noticed early on for her distinctive style.

In 1999, she was awarded a Villa Medicis Hors-les murs grant for her research in creating Texture/Composite, for which she was awarded the Prix d’Auteur at the Rencontres chorégraphiques internationales de Bagnolet in 2000. The piece was subsequently presented at Danspace Project in New York in 2002. Since then her productions have been presented on a regular basis both in France and abroad. In January 2012, Vo-Dinh became the director of Le Phare, Centre Chorégraphique National du Havre Haute-Normandie, ushering in a new artistic vision that has reached out to a diversity of choreographic styles.

Vo-Dinh's wide-ranging choreography has been shaped through the process of creating new work. While she initially focused on choreographing in a more formal way, her methodology gradually evolved toward an open-ended process affording a prominent role to improvisation in the studio. Surrounded by close collaborators, Vo-Dinh works with her performers on a long-term basis.

Several pieces have been deeply rooted in scientific and anthropological research on human beings, romantic relationships, absence, the lack of emotion and schizophrenia. The art world has also informed her work: between figurative and abstract in the visual arts, as well as in the relationship between bodies in motion and the music of Beethoven, Dusapin, Zeena Parkins or Gérard Grisey. Although the choreographic structure often draws on minimalism to the point of repeating and transforming a single motif, Vo-Dinh has mainly focused on time, how it is perceived and its relationship to memory and memories. After a long absence, fragmented narration has surfaced in her latest pieces – a new approach to time and point of view, as well as to the body and how it relates to others.

Vo-Dinh readily accepts invitations, including Rainbow, her piece for amateur dancers in collaboration with David Monceau, and her work with the writer Jérôme Mauche for Concordanse. Beginning with Histoires Exquises in 2011, she has invited choreographers to create solos from oral testimonies, the starting point for opening up the creative process to audiences. That willingness to share and her curiosity about other approaches to dance were to be the leitmotif in her vision for the CCN du Havre. Since 2012, Vo-Dinh has endeavored to make Le Phare a platform for many different kinds of choreography – during key moments such as the Pharenheit festival, as well as throughout the year, bringing the CCN to life in order to showcase dance in all it vibrancy.

Since 2014, she has been the president of the Association des Centres Chorégraphiques Nationaux, a network comprising nineteen national choreographic centers in France. Vo-Dinh was awarded the insignia of Chevalier de l’ordre des Arts et des Lettres in July 2014.

== Emmanuelle Vo-Dinh's pieces ==
- 1998 : Anthume ou le Membre fantôme
- 1999 : Texture/Composite
- 2001 : Sagen
- 2003 : Décompositions
- 2004 : Croisées
- 2005 : White Light
- 2006 : ici/Per.For
- 2007 : Aboli Bibelot... Rebondi
- 2007 : Eaux fortes
- 2008 : 5'24
- 2008 : Rainbow en collaboration avec David Monceau (reprise en 2010)
- 2009 : Ad astra
- 2009 : Fractale
- 2010 : -transire-
- 2011 : Vortex
- 2013 : -insight-
- 2013 : Sprint
- 2013 : Eaux-fortes (re-création)
- 2015 : Tombouctou déjà-vu
