= Traffic Continues =

Studio album by Fred Frith and the Ensemble Modern
- Released: 14 March 2000
- Recorded: 14–17 December 1998; Das TAT, Bockenheimer Depot, Frankfurt
- Genre: Contemporary classical music, Jazz
- Length: 64:00
- Label: Winter & Winter 910 044
- Producer: Stefan Winter

Fred Frith chronology
Stone, Brick, Glass, Wood, Wire (1999)	Traffic Continues (2000)	2 Gentlemen in Verona (2000)

Traffic Continues is an album by composer and guitarist Fred Frith featuring the Ensemble Modern, Zeena Parkins and Ikue Mori, which was released on the Winter & Winter label. The album features a suite dedicated to cellist Tom Cora built around samples of his playing from Etymology (Rarefaction, 1997).

== Reception ==
Professional ratings
Review scores
Source	Rating
AllMusic	4.5/5 stars
All About Jazz	4.5/5 stars

In his review for AllMusic, Dave Lynch called the album "one of the strongest statements of Frith's career, a finely balanced work that contains concert hall and street sensibilities in equal measure". PopMatters observed "this is adventurous and often heady music that is not for all tastes. But then, it’s not really meant to be either since this is music that sets out to challenge what is accepted as much as what is acceptable". The All About Jazz review noted "Traffic Continues is a fine and noteworthy edition to Fred Frith’s extensive catalog and ongoing legacy. Besides possessing a remarkably individualistic voice as a powerful and quite influential technician, Frith’s perceptive intellect shines forth on this multifaceted and curiously interesting recording".

== Track listing ==
All compositions by Fred Frith

Traffic Continues

1. "Inadvertent Introduction" – 0:53
2. "First Riddle" – 2:30
3. "Traffic II" – 4:25
4. "Third Riddle" – 2:13
5. "Lourdement Gai" – 1:06
6. "Traffic III/Traffic I" – 2:17
7. "Freeway/Shadow of a Tree on Sand" – 5:28
8. "Fragile Finale" – 9:55

Traffic Continues II: Gusto (For Tom Cora)

9. "Introduction/Limbo" – 1:55
10. Adage A/At Your Earliest" – 4:45
11. "Gyrate/Adage B" – 3:25
12. "Not If I See You First" – 1:17
13. "Any Other World" – 1:27
14. "A Good Top Tongue" – 0:16
15. "Nose at Nose" – 0:56
16. "Will Cast Some Light On" – 1:32
17. "Adage D/Neither Fire Nor Place" – 0:45
18. "Monkey Lens Dipthong String" – 3:33
19. "Howdywhoola" – 0:17
20. "No Convenient Time" – 3:30
21. "One Never Knows Do One?/Adage Coda/Long Fade" – 11:34

== Personnel ==
- Fred Frith – guitar, musical director
- Zeena Parkins – harp (tracks 9–21)
- Ikue Mori – drum machines (tracks 9–21)

Ensemble Modern

- Uwe Dierksen – trombone
- Roland Diry – clarinet
- Thomas Fichter – double bass, electric bass
- Heinz Huber – accordion (tracks 9–21)
- Michael M. Kasper – cello
- Freya Kirby, Hilary Sturt – violin
- Susan Knight – viola
- Hermann Kretzschmar – piano, sampler
- Catherine Milliken – oboe, bass oboe, English horn
- Bruce Nockles – trumpet
- Rumi Ogawa-Helferich – percussion, cymbalom
- Franck Ollu – horn, conductor
- Rainer Roemer – percussion
- Noriko Shimada – bassoon, contrabassoon
- Wolfgang Styri – saxophone, contrabass clarinet
- Dietmar Wiesner – flute, bass flute, piccolo
