= Third Person (band) =

1990s musical trio formed in New York City

Third Person was an improvising trio formed in 1990 in New York City, led by cellist Tom Cora and drummer Samm Bennett. Each performance featured an invited guest: A third person. Guests included guitarist Marc Ribot, harpist Zeena Parkins, clarinet player Don Byron and saxophone players George Cartwright and Kazutoki Umezu and many others.

The trio's music was entirely improvised, but typically quite melodic, and even funky.

With Cora's death in 1998, Third Person effectively dissolved.

== Discography ==
- Bends [live] (1990, Knitting Factory)
- Trick Moon (1991, Tsuki no Uso)
- Lucky Water (1995, Knitting Factory)
