= Etymology (disambiguation) =

Etymology is the study of the history of words.

Etymology or etymologies may also refer to:

- Etymologiae, a 7th-century encyclopedia compiled by Isidore of Seville
- The Etymologies (Tolkien), a 1987 Elvish dictionary by J. R. R. Tolkien
- Etymology (album), a 1997 audio library by Skeleton Crew
