= Dave Newhouse =

American musician and composer (born 1953)

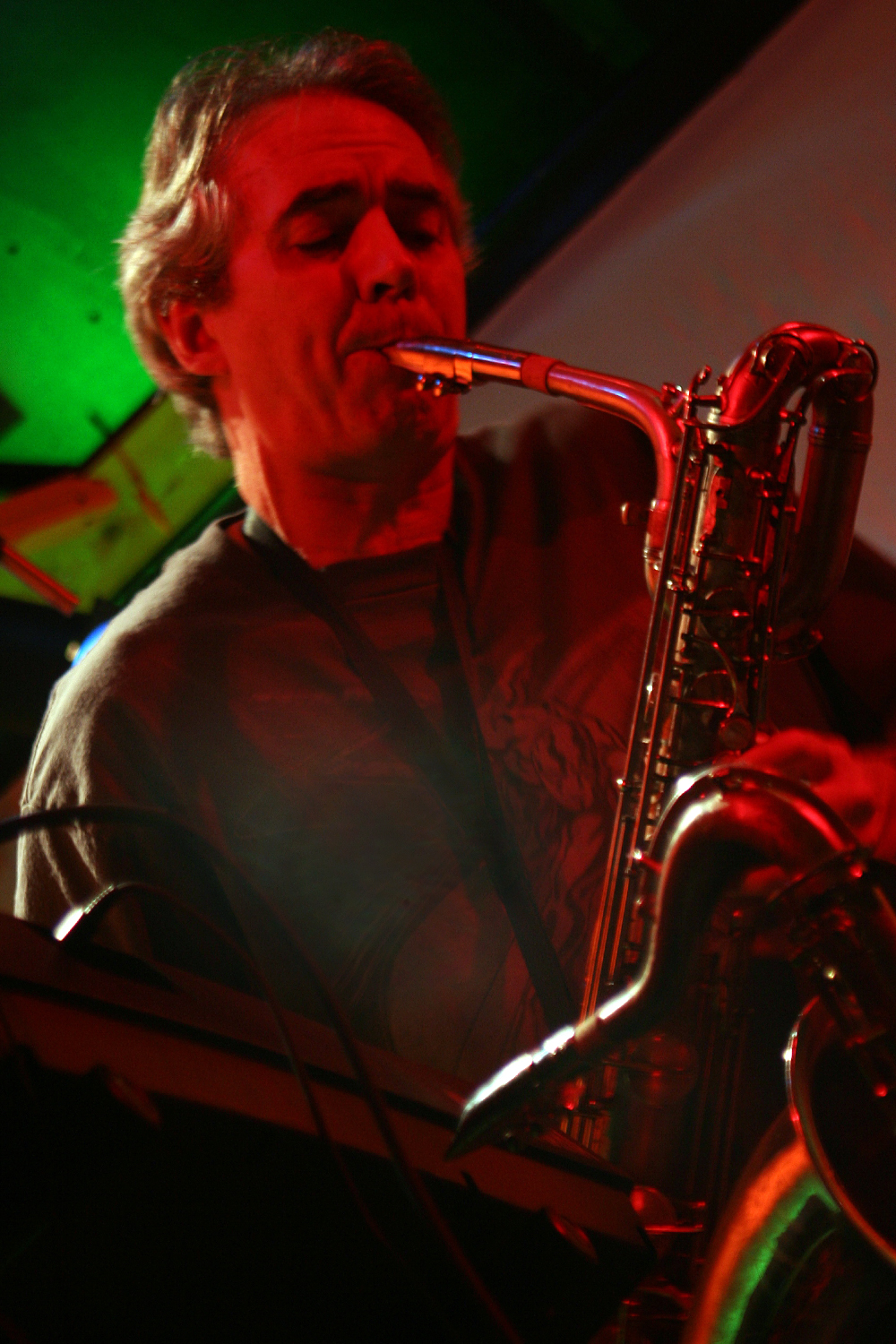
- Newhouse with Thee Maximalists at Orion Sound Studios in Baltimore, Maryland, 2007

Background information
- Born: David Newhouse; 1953 (age 72–73); Hawaii, United States
- Genres: Progressive rock; avant-garde jazz
- Occupations: Musician, composer
- Instruments: Saxophone, keyboards
- Years active: 1977–present
- Formerly of: The Muffins

David Newhouse (born 1953) is an American progressive rock and avant-garde jazz multi-instrumentalist and composer. He was one on the founding members of the Maryland-based progressive rock/avant-jazz band, the Muffins, and has recorded nine solo albums, five of them as Manna/Mirage, a solo project he created in 2015.

== Biography ==
Newhouse was born in Hawaii in 1953, but moved with his family to Maryland the same year. He began playing clarinet at school when he was nine years old, then took up tenor saxophone in junior high school. His father had played alto saxophone in his own high school band. Newhouse taught himself keyboards on his parents' upright piano. Newhouse played in two bands, Sledge and Tunc before forming the Muffins in Maryland with guitarist Michael Zentner and bassist Billy Swann in 1973. Saxophonist Thomas Scott and drummer Paul Sears joined the Muffins a few years later.

The Muffins recorded their first album, Manna/Mirage in 1978, which attracted the attention of Fred Frith and Chris Cutler of the English experimental rock group, Henry Cow. When Henry Cow disbanded later in 1978, Frith moved to New York City and performed with the Muffins in Washington, D.C. He also played on and produced their second album, 185 in September 1980. Frith recorded his own 1980 solo album, Gravity at Scott's Rockville, Maryland studio, and used the Muffins as his backing band.

In 1981, the Muffins split up, and Newhouse continued to work with Frith. He joined Frith and Tom Cora's new group, Skeleton Crew for their first concert tour in Europe in 1982, (Note: Extracts of Skeleton Crew's 1982 concerts with Newhouse surfaced 40 years later on the group's first live album, Free Dirt (Live).) but left the band after the tour. Newhouse recalled later that while it had been "a pleasant experience ... it was not a profitable one". He explained that he had met his wife-to-be and "was ready to start a life with her and a career (a real job) where I finally made some money." Back in America, Newhouse and his wife moved to Albuquerque, New Mexico where he acquired a degree in education and began a new career as a school teacher.

In the early 1990s the couple returned to the East Coast, where Newhouse reunited with the former members of the Muffins. He learnt of the continued interest being shown in the band's music, and it was decided to reform the Muffins with Newhouse. The band performed live at several music festivals locally and in Italy and France, and recorded several new albums. In 2016 the Muffins broke up one final time.

Newhouse also pursued a solo career, which included releasing four albums, and the creation of a solo project, Manna/Mirage, which was inspired by the Muffins' original music. (Note: Newhouse said that he named his Manna/Mirage solo project after title of the Muffins' first album to highlight the Muffins connection.) The Manna/Mirage project went on to make five albums. Newhouse also became involved in several collaborations, including Paul Sear's Thee Maximalists, Moon X with Jerry King and Newhouse's son George Newhouse on drums, and Bluehouzer with Chester Hawkins and Gary Rouzer.

== Discography ==
Solo

- Soldier's Book (1989)
- The Round Window (1991)
- Natura Morta (2024)
- Soli (2025)

As Manna/Mirage

- Blue Dogs (2015)
- Rest of the World (2018)
- Face (2020)
- Man Out of Time (2021)
- Autobiographie (2023)
