= Jerry King (musician) =

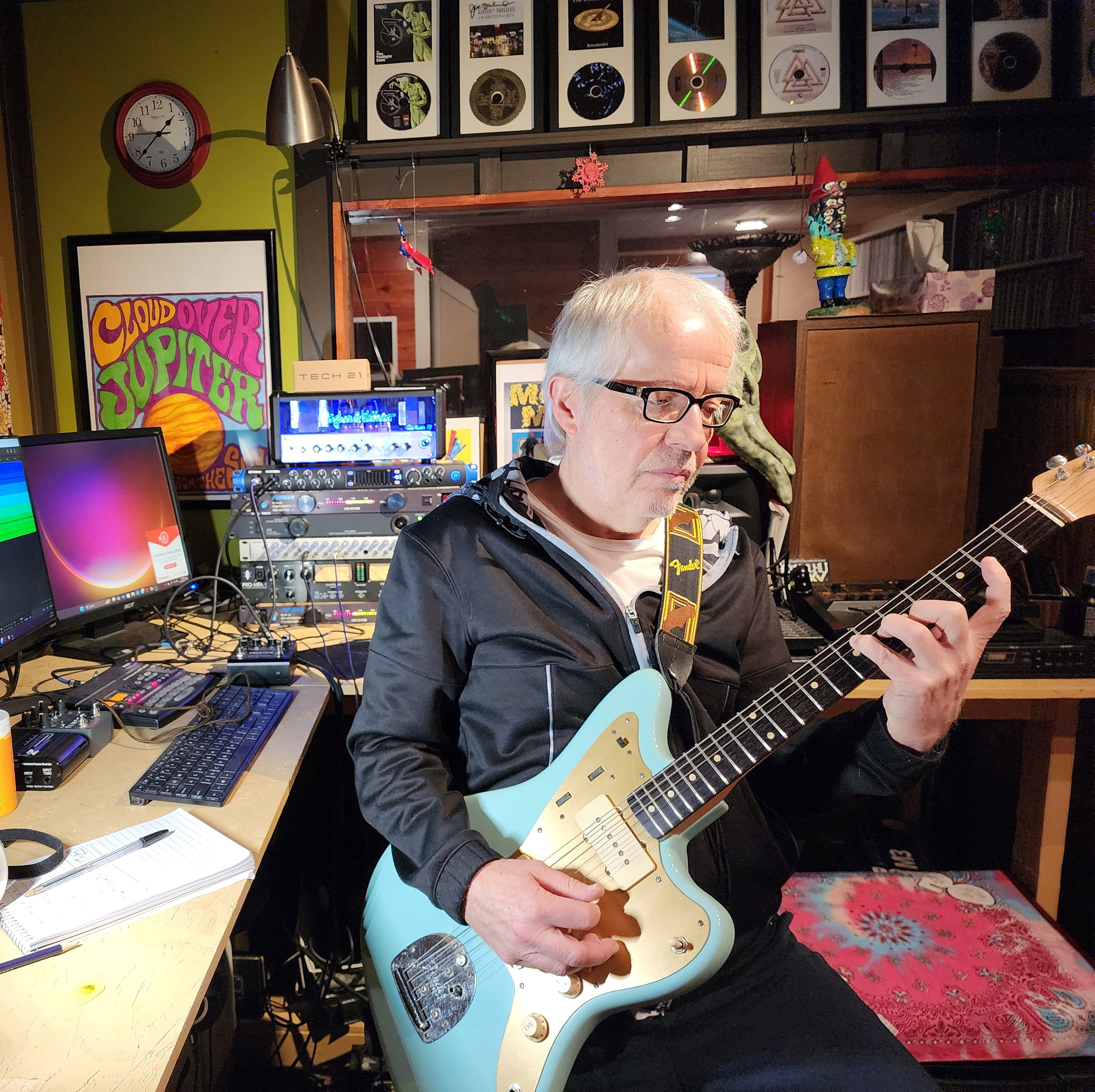
Cloud Over Jupiter guitarist Jerry King in his studio

Jerry King (born 1956) is a Wisconsin-based composer and multi-instrumentalist primarily known as the founder, guitarist, and bassist for progressive rock band Cloud Over Jupiter.

== History ==
King first formed the Central Wisconsin rock group called Zany Starblaster in 1977. The band played rock stages all about the U.S. Midwest through 1980 when the band tired of the road work and dissolved. Studio and live recordings of the group surfaced later and King released the best of the tracks in 2019.

For influences, King told It's Psychedelic Baby! Magazine that he grew up listening to rock music, including funk rock and early progressive rock.

== Recordings ==
He traveled around the US for the next decade until he finally settled again in Wisconsin, where he formed several bands which performed regularly. In 2013 he built his studio and proceeded to work on all new original material that later was released under his band name, Cloud Over Jupiter.

== Projects ==
Cloud Over Jupiter is King's main outlet for his compositions and he continues to release new albums regularly. His wife, Michele King, (vocals, piano and clarinet) has been a consistent band member. King was interviewed and featured in Issue #74 of Progression Magazine (Summer, 2018 issue)

Moon Men was formed in 2017 by Bret H. Hart and The Muffin's founder and multi-instrumentalist Dave Newhouse. Drummer Bill Jungwirth, and bassist/guitarist Jerry King were invited to join the group as rhythm section. Moon Men recorded five albums of all original music until the band folded in 2021.

Newhouse and King continued as a trio with Newhouse's son, George, on drums, calling themselves Moon X. Three albums have been released to date since 2022. In 2018 King collaborated with horror and fantasy writer, John Shirley, on one album of music. Since then they have collaborated on several other releases including the Cloud Over Jupiter album, Short Stories For Tall Aliens.

In December of 2022, King, along with Dave Newhouse, produced a compilation of new experimental music titled "ZZAJ: Jazz From the 23rd Century". The compilation included tracks by 34 different artists from around the world, including Martin Archer, Anthony Coleman, Henry Kaiser, Elliott Sharp, and others. The album was reviewed in the March 2023 issue of BBC Music Magazine.

In 2024, the album "Atomic Jupiter" was released on the Melodic Revolution Records label, and included appearances by drummer Ric Parnell (RIP), Blue Oyster Cult guitarist Richie Castellano, guitarist Nick Didkovsky, The Muffins drummer Paul Sears, guitarist Pete Prown, and others.

In 2026, King started releasing his music under his own record label, Jupiter Works Music.

== Partial discography ==
=== Cloud Over Jupiter ===
- 5th Mass From the Sun (2015)
- Short Stories For Tall Aliens (with John Shirley) (2019)
- They're Here With Us...Not For Us (2021)
- Atomic Jupiter (2024)

=== Moon Men ===
- Amazing Science-Fiction Stories (2017)
- Uncomfortable Space Probe (2018)
- 3 (2019)
- 3.5 The EP (2019)
- Tales of the Space Pirates (2020)

=== John Shirley ===
- Spaceship Landing in a Cemetery (2018)
- Escape From Gravity (2022)

=== Moon X ===
- Zap! (2022)
- The New Prometheus (2023)
- Rocket To the Moon (2025)

=== With others ===
- The Dukes of 1987 - Retroderelict (2016)
- Jamie Bruhn - Cigarettes and Lies (2017)
- A View From a Hill, Linear Obsessional (compilation with various artists)(2017)
- Diratz – Diratz (2017)
- Frets of Yore – A Collection of Guitart Pieces for the Immediate Past (compilation with various artists) (2017)
- Greg Segal With Friends - Invisible Ground of Sympathy (compilation)(2017)
- Manna Mirage – Rest of the World (2018)
- Bret Hart - Dubble Thud (2018)
- Greg Segal With Friends - Visible (compilation)(2018)
- Walter Whitney and Bret Hart - Creepy Clown Ice Cream Truck (2018)
- Oval Planet – Trench Poems (2019)
- Bret Hart and Tom Furgas - I Borrowed Your Axe (2019)
- Zany Starblaster – The Lost Tapes (2019)
- Bret Hart - Tipped A Mule (2019)
- Manna Mirage – Face (2020)
- Bret Hart - Four Artists V1 (2020)
- Bret Hart - Four Artists Series V5 (2020)
- Bret Hart - Four Artists Series V6 (2020)
- Nick Prol and the Proletarians - Present...An Erstwisle Alphabestiary: Book One (2020)
- Gates of Oktober – "Guilty Man" and “Malathion” (2020) [singles]
- Icy Drinks - Teardrop (2020)(single)
- Michael Kinney and the Wild Saints - Leaving the Chaos (2021)
- Jerry King and Bret Hart – Oblique Observations (2021)
- There Is No Time – self titled album (2021)
- Reverse Trio - Jeff Gordon, Jerry King, Pete Prown (2021)
- Manna Mirage – Man Out of Time (2021)
- Pete Prown and Friends – The Fusion Tapes (2021)
- Gordon * Prown * King - Moorish Code (2021)
- Refestramus – Decoupage (2021)
- The Lizardz - Memoria (2022)
- ZZAJ: Jazz From the 23rd Century (compilation)(2022)
- Manna Mirage - Autobiographie (2023)
- The Church of Noisy Goat - 23 Enigma (compilation)(2023)
- Refestramus - Intourist (2024)
- Dave Newhouse - Natura Morta (2024)
- Amanda Chaudhary and Meow Meow Band - January Suborbital Denomination (2024)
- Greg Segal - I Used To Work Here (2024)
- Dave Newhouse - Improvika I (2025)
- Refestramus - Morri's Rock Boutique (2026)
- Bret Hart - The Ukraine 4: 4 Solitary Meditations For a War's End (compilation)(2026)
- Dave Newhouse - Automatic Writing (2026)
