= Free Dirt (Live) =

Live album by Skeleton Crew
- Released: December 31, 2021
- Recorded: 1982–1986
- Venue: Switzerland, France, Germany, United States, Canada
- Genre: Avant-rock; experimental
- Length: 124:17
- Label: Klanggalerie (Austria)
- Producer: Fred Frith

Skeleton Crew chronology
Etymology (1997)	Free Dirt (Live) (2021)

Free Dirt (Live) is a live double-CD album by American experimental rock and jazz band Skeleton Crew. It is their first live album and was released posthumously in December 2021 by Austrian record label, Klanggalerie. It comprises live material by the group recorded at eight venues in Europe, Canada and the United States between 1982 and 1986. Both CDs feature Fred Frith and Tom Cora, with Dave Newhouse on eight tracks on the first CD, and Zeena Parkins on thirteen tracks on the second CD.

== Background ==
When compiling Free Dirt, Frith's intention was to recreate the atmosphere of a Skeleton Crew concert. He wanted to convey the spontaneous nature of their performances, when planning was often left to the last minute and things did not always go according to plan. Frith assembled the album from mostly 35+-year-old cassette tape recordings of varying quality from concerts around the world. He edited and "sonically enhanced" the recordings to create an almost seamless stream of music. (Note: Frith said in an interview that this process took place during COVID-19 when things slowed down and people found themselves with plenty of free time. This album "would never have happened except through lockdown!") Frith stated in the album's liner notes:

"Listening to our sorta kinda demented anti-industry and even anti-music angle of view, I'm still delighted at how loose we were with the material, how the same pieces changed so radically from night to night ... I re-discovered pieces that I'd completely forgotten about – can't even remember the titles – and listening to the tapes took on the feeling of being there on that breathless runaway train ... I hope I managed to get that across."

== Reception ==
A review of Free Dirt (Live) at Vital Weekly described the album as "a two-hour wild ride of music". It said it is full of diverse styles, ranging from rock music to folk tunes to "pikey punkiness", plus plenty of enthusiastic improvisation. The inclusion of prerecorded voices adds "a dramatic radio quality to the music." The reviewer enjoyed the way it "bounc[ed] around the place" and found the album "fascinat[ing]". In a review of the album at salt peanuts*, Eyal Hareuveni called Free Dirt (Live) "a work of love for an era and for music-making that is almost impossible today". Hareuveni said "it captures beautifully the amazing creative spirit and post-punk energy" that Skeleton Crew possessed, and "radiat[es] an uplifting power", while emphasizing just how well Frith, Cora, Newhouse and Parkins connected. Rick Anderson wrote at CD Hotlist that melodies on Free Dirt often degenerate into "scratches and caterwauls", while improvised noise sometimes morphs into folk tunes. Anderson said:

"One of the wonderful things about Fred Frith is that even when he's making horrible noise, he does it with such obvious delight and with such a well-communicated sense of warmth and invitation that you find yourself just going with it and having a wonderful time."

Reviewing Free Dirt in the Italian magazine Ondarock, Alessandro Di Tizio said this album is an important chronicle of Skeleton Crew's music. The two studio albums they released are mere snapshots of their work, whereas Free Dirt shows how their music evolved from the beginning, how songs materialized from improvisation, and how songs changed shape with each performance. Di Tizio explained that this album demonstrates how they used improvisation to explore new ideas, and reveals the group's creative and compositional process. He stated that despite the varying quality of the tapes used to create the album, it flows smoothly, giving the impression that it is a recording of a single performance. Di Tizio called their composed material "always beautiful, complex and highly creative" (brani sempre belli, complessi e altamente creativi), and added that the new songs on the second CD give a glimpse of the direction Skeleton Crew may have taken had they not disbanded in early 1986.

== Track listing ==
All tracks composed by Skeleton Crew, unless otherwise stated. All tracks performed by Fred Frith and Tom Cora, plus Dave Newhouse or Zeena Parkins where noted.

CD 1: Skeleton Crew 1982–83
No.	Title	Writer(s)	Recorded	Length
1.	"The Introduction/The Way Things Fall"		May 23, 1983	4:18
2.	"Almost Free I"		May 24, 1983	1:32
3.	"Disporting Themselves at Improper Moments"		May 24, 1983	3:12
4.	"Not My Shoes"		October 9, 1982 (with Dave Newhouse)	2:39
5.	"Select Short Stories I"		May 23, 1983	3:26
6.	"Factory Song"		May 23, 1983	6:18
7.	"Onwards and Upwards"		October 30, 1982 (with Newhouse)	5:40
8.	"Automatic Pilot"		May 23, 1983	2:07
9.	"Hook"		October 9, 1982 (with Newhouse)	4:33
10.	"Selected Short Stories II"		May 23, 1983	4:03
11.	"Life at the Top"	Fred Frith	May 23, 1983	2:16
12.	"Almost Free II"		May 23, 1983	2:20
13.	"Yer Elegy"		October 22, 1982 (with Newhouse)	1:17
14.	"Dere Geliyor"	trad. Turkish	October 22, 1982 (with Newhouse)	3:18
15.	"Listening In"		October 30, 1982 (with Newhouse)	0:44
16.	"Los Colitos"		October 30, 1982 (with Newhouse)	4:01
17.	"Zach's Flag"	Tom Cora	October 22, 1982 (with Newhouse)	3:45
18.	"Half-Remembered Yesterdays"		May 23, 1983	2:20
Total length:				57:49

CD 2: Skeleton Crew 1984–86
No.	Title	Writer(s)	Recorded	Length
1.	"Just the Beginning"		September 13, 1986 (with Zeena Parkins)	1:38
2.	"The Hand that Bites"		September 13, 1986 (with Parkins)	6:17
3.	"Selected Short Stories III"		July 14/15, 1985 (with Parkins)	1:30
4.	"Safety in Numbers"		July 14/15, 1985 (with Parkins)	3:24
5.	"Bingo"		September 13, 1986 (with Parkins)	3:35
6.	"Dead Sheep Coda"		November 15, 1984	1:44
7.	"Factory Song (More or Less Instrumental Version)"		November 15, 1984	3:51
8.	"It's Fine"		November 15, 1984	6:42
9.	"Spanner in the Works"		September 13, 1986 (with Parkins)	5:01
10.	"The Folk Tune"	traditional	November 15, 1984	2:52
11.	"Sparrow Song"		September 13, 1986 (with Parkins)	1:24
12.	"Selected Short Stories IV"	Zeena Parkins	July 14/15, 1985 (with Parkins)	0:38
13.	"Begin Again"		September 13, 1986 (with Parkins)	2:54
14.	"Second Rate"		September 13, 1986 (with Parkins)	5:22
15.	"New Orleans Stomp"	Jelly Roll Morton, arr. Skeleton Crew	November 15, 1984	2:33
16.	"Selected Short Stories V"		November 15, 1984	2:42
17.	"Birds of Japan"		September 13, 1986 (with Parkins)	4:05
18.	"Selected Short Stories VI"		July 14/15, 1985 (with Parkins)	2:41
19.	"You May Find a Bed"	Cora, Frith, Parkins, Rebby Sharp	September 13, 1986 (with Parkins)	7:32
Total length:				66:28

Source: Liner notes

== Track notes ==
CD 1

- Tracks 4 and 9 were recorded at the Musik Ausser Kontrol Festival, Rote Fabrik, Zürich, Switzerland on October 9, 1982
- Tracks 13, 14 and 17 were recorded at 28 Rue Dunois, Paris on October 22, 1982
- Tracks 7, 15 and 16 were recorded at Würzburg, Germany on October 30, 1982
- Tracks 1, 5, 6, 8, 10–12 and 18 were recorded at Salle Rameau, Lyon, France on May 23, 1983
- Tracks 2 and 3 were recorded at Hall Gatty, Saint-Étienne, France on May 24, 1983

CD 2

- Tracks 6–8, 10, 15 and 16 were recorded at Trito's Uptown (misspelled as Triton Uptown in the liner notes), Champaign, Illinois on November 15, 1984
- Tracks 3, 4, 12 and 18 were recorded at The lsabella, Toronto on July 14/15, 1985
- Tracks 1, 2, 5, 9, 11, 13, 14, 17 and 19 were recorded by David Bryant at CBGB, New York City on September 13, 1986

Source: Liner notes

== Personnel ==
CD 1

- Fred Frith – guitar, 6-string bass guitar, violin, slap-thwacker, (Note: Frith explained that a "slap-thwacker" is "a home-made one-string bass instrument that allowed me to play bass and drums at the same time".) Casio, cassette player, snare drum, bass drum, voice
- Tom Cora – cello, bass guitar, samples, bass drum, woodblocks, hi-hat, cymbal, voice
- Dave Newhouse (tracks 4, 7, 9, 13–17) – bass clarinet, alto saxophone, keyboards, miscellaneous percussion

CD 2

- Fred Frith – guitar, bass guitar, violin, snare drum, bass drum, voice
- Tom Cora – cello, bass guitar, accordion, bass drum, woodblocks, hi-hat, cymbal, voice
- Zeena Parkins (tracks 1–5, 9, 11–14, 17–19) – electric harp, keyboards, accordion, toms, voice

Sound and production

- Compiled, edited and sonically enhanced from mostly 35+-year-old cassette tapes by Fred Frith
- Mastered by Myles Boisen at Headless Buddha, Oakland, California in August 2021
- Layout by Lisa Robotka
- Liner notes by Fred Frith

Source: Liner notes
