= The Country of Blinds =

Studio album by Skeleton Crew
- Released: 1986
- Recorded: December 1985 to January 1986
- Studio: Kirchberg, Switzerland
- Genre: Avant-rock; experimental
- Length: 39:25
- Label: Rift (US)
- Producer: Tim Hodgkinson

Skeleton Crew chronology
Learn to Talk (1984)	The Country of Blinds (1986)	Learn to Talk / Country of Blinds (1990)

Professional ratings
Review scores
Source	Rating
AllMusic	3/5 stars

The Country of Blinds is a studio album by American experimental rock and jazz band Skeleton Crew, recorded at Sunrise Studio, Kirchberg, Switzerland, December 1985 and January 1986. It was their second and final album and was released in 1986.

Skeleton Crew had become the trio of Fred Frith, Tom Cora and Zeena Parkins when this album was made. The music here is richer, more rhythmic and fuller-sounding and the songs more developed than on their first album; this ultimately led to the band's break-up. Frith explained that "we actually started to sound like a normal rock and roll band so it seemed kind of pointless to go on at that point."

== Track listing ==
Side A
No.	Title	Writer(s)	Length
1.	"The Country of Blinds"	Skeleton Crew, Cora	4:10
2.	"Money Crack"	Skeleton Crew	0:58
3.	"The Border"	Skeleton Crew, Anne Hemenway	3:28
4.	"The Hand that Bites"	Skeleton Crew, Frith	5:32
5.	"Dead Sheep"	Skeleton Crew, Cora, Frith	3:22
6.	"Bingo"	Skeleton Crew, Frith	3:34

Side B
No.	Title	Writer(s)	Length
7.	"Man or Monkey"	Skeleton Crew, Cutler	2:37
8.	"Foot in Hole"	Skeleton Crew	3:08
9.	"Hot Field"	Skeleton Crew	2:36
10.	"The Birds of Japan"	Skeleton Crew, Frith	4:00
11.	"You May Find a Bed"	Skeleton Crew, Frith, Sharp	6:10

=== Track notes ===
- "Money Crack", "Hot Field" and the last section of "You May Find a Bed" were recorded live in Reykjavík, Iceland, November 4, 1985.

== Personnel ==
- Tom Cora – cello, bass, accordion, drums, contraptions, singing
- Fred Frith – guitar, 6-string bass, violin, home-mades, drums, singing
- Zeena Parkins – organ, electric harp, accordion, drums, singing

=== Sound and art work ===
- Tim Hodgkinson – engineer, producer
- Katrina Brändli – assistant engineer
- Fred Frith – cover art work

== CD reissues ==
In 1990 RecRec Music re-issued The Country of Blinds together with Skeleton Crew's previous album Learn to Talk on a single compilation CD, Learn to Talk / Country of Blinds, omitting "Money Crack" from The Country of Blinds, and "Los Colitos" and "Life At The Top" from Learn to Talk.

In 2005 Fred Records re-issued Learn to Talk / Country of Blinds on a double compilation CD, omitting only "Money Crack" from The Country of Blinds, and adding ten extra tracks.
