= Stone, Brick, Glass, Wood, Wire =

Live album by Fred Frith
- Released: 1999
- Recorded: 1992–1995
- Venue: Belgium, Canada, Italy, the Netherlands, Germany
- Genre: Experimental rock; improvisation
- Length: 94:36
- Label: I Dischi di Angelica (Italy)
- Producer: Fred Frith; Massimo Simonini

Fred Frith chronology
Friends & Enemies (1999)	Stone, Brick, Glass, Wood, Wire (1999)	Traffic Continues (2000)

Professional ratings
Review scores
Source	Rating
AllMusic	4/5 stars

Stone, Brick, Glass, Wood, Wire (Graphic Scores 1986–96) is a double live album by English guitarist, composer and improvisor Fred Frith. It comprises a series of graphic scores Frith composed in 1992 "for any number of players". It was performed live by Frith, Ikue Mori, Zeena Parkins and the International Occasional Ensemble at five concerts in Canada (October 1992), Italy (May 1992), Belgium (May 1994), Netherlands (October 1994) and Germany (October 1995). Frith also conducted and directed the performances.

== Background ==
The graphic scores used for the performances were a set of photographs taken by Frith of a variety of inanimate objects, including stone pavings, brick walls, windows, stacks of logs and high-tension wires. Each photograph had instructions explaining to the musicians how to interpret the patterns in the image. For example, "Skylight IV" was a photograph of skylights in a large building and was annotated as follows:

Three duos and a solo, accumulative and staggered. A - drums/harp. B - baritone sax/piano. C - drum machines/bass clarinet. D - trumpet. Black vertical lines = silence. Time left to right. First duo plays first line. After 30 seconds, second duo starts second line. First duo re-enters at white dotted line, repeating first line as exactly as possible. Process continues in the same way. Note that black 'blocks' within the playing frame represent silence also. Duration: 4:00. Conducted.

Frith chose the pictures for the patterns and repetitions they contained. Breaks in the patterns (for example, paint smudges, leaves on sand) guided soloists and defined instrumental groupings. Generally time was read from left to right and pitch vertically. Under the direction of Frith, with wide latitude given to each individual musician's interpretation of the proceedings, the resulting music was a form of structured improvisation. Dave Lynch at AllMusic wrote: "At its best, structured improvisation can provide a guiding context that enhances, rather than limits, the impact of the improvisations themselves. Such is the case with Stone, Brick, Glass, Wood, Wire, some of the best photographs you ever heard."

== Track listing ==
All tracks composed by Fred Frith.

Disc 1
No.	Title	Length
1.	"Untitled": "Goongerah"; "Tokyo"; "Firewood"	13:19 4:20 2:15 6:42
2.	"Untitled": "Screen"; "Dry Stone I"; "Dry Stone II"	11:17 3:38 4:59 2:39
3.	"Untitled": "Bricks for Six"; "Vlissingen"	8:43 4:10 4:33
4.	"Skylight"	3:27
5.	"Dry Stone II"	4:17
6.	"Bricks for Six"	1:48
7.	"Untitled": "Dry Stone I"; "Dry Stone II"	4:12 2:03 2:09
8.	"Untitled": "Skylight (extract)"; "High Tension (extract)"	1:38 0:31 1:07
9.	"Roof"	1:28
10.	"Untitled": "Screen"; "High Tension"; "Zurich"	5:59 3:40 1:33 0:46
11.	"Athens"	3:39
12.	"Firewood"	1:49

Disc 2
No.	Title	Length
1.	"Untitled": "Green"; "Dry Stone II"; "Improvisation"; "Roof"; "Improvisation"; "Reykjavik"; "Vlissingen"; "Improvisation"; "Skylight V (extract)"	33:39 5:54 6:50 1:34 1:54 1:45 4:02 5:15 1:17 5:18
2.	"Untitled": "Improvisation"; "Tokyo (extract)"	6:35 5:28 1:06
3.	"Screen"	5:49
4.	"Jahresringe"	4:34
5.	"Firewood"	6:23

=== Venues ===
- Disc 1, tracks 1–2 recorded live at the Time Festival, Ghent, Belgium, May 1994
- Disc 1, tracks 3–5 recorded live at the 10th Festival International de Musique Actuelle de Victoriaville, Victoriaville, Quebec, Canada, October 1992
- Disc 1, tracks 6–8 recorded live at the Angelica Festival Internazionale di Musica, Bologna, Italy, May 1992
- Disc 1, tracks 9–12 recorded live at the Jazz Marathon, Groningen, the Netherlands, October 1994
- Disc 2, tracks 1–5 recorded live at the Kulturzentrum Dieselstrasse, Esslingen, Germany, October 1995

== Personnel ==
- Fred Frith – violin, guitar, direction
- Ikue Mori (all but disc 1, tracks 6–8) – drum computers
- Zeena Parkins (all but disc 1, tracks 6–8) – harp, electric harp, accordion
- Olivia Bignardi (disc 1, tracks 6–8) – clarinet, bass clarinet
- Daniela Cattivelli (disc 1, tracks 6–8) – alto saxophone
- Jean Derome (disc 1, tracks 3–5) – alto saxophone, baritone saxophone, flutes
- Hans Koch (disc 2, tracks 1–5) – saxophones, clarinets
- Roberto Paci Dalo (disc 1, tracks 6–8) – clarinet, bass clarinet
- Mariette Rouppe van der Voort (disc 1, tracks 9–12; disc 2, tracks 1–5) – soprano saxophone, flute, alto flute
- Co Streiff (disc 1, tracks 9–12; disc 2, tracks 1–5) – tenor saxophone, baritone saxophone
- Raymund van Santen (disc 1, tracks 1–2,9–12) – alto saxophone
- Peter Vermeersch (disc 1, tracks 1–2) – tenor saxophone, clarinet
- Takashi Yamane (disc 1, tracks 1–2) – bass clarinet
- Stefano Zorzanello (disc 1, tracks 6–8) – soprano saxophone, flute
- Lesli Dalaba (disc 1, tracks 3–5) – trumpet
- Ferdinando d'Andria (disc 1, tracks 6–8) – trumpet, violin
- Bart Maris (disc 1, tracks 1–2,9–12; disc 2, tracks 1–5) – trumpet
- Salvatore Panu (disc 1, tracks 6–8) – trombone
- Giorgio Simbola (disc 1, tracks 6–8) – bombardino
- Paolo Angeli (disc 1, tracks 6–8) – guitar
- Claudio Lanteri (disc 1, tracks 6–8) – guitar
- René Lussier (disc 1, tracks 1–5) – guitar, daxophone
- Jean-Marc Montera (disc 1, tracks 9–12) – guitar
- Silvia Fanti (disc 1, tracks 6–8) – accordion
- Guy Klucevsek (disc 1, tracks 3–5) – accordion
- Filomena Forleo (disc 1, tracks 6–8) – piano
- Myra Melford (disc 1, tracks 3–5) – piano
- Daan van der Walle (disc 1, tracks 1–2,9–12) – piano
- Christine Wodraszka (disc 2, tracks 1–5) – piano
- Pierangelo Galantino (disc 1, tracks 6–8) – violin, double bass
- Lelio Giannetto (disc 1, tracks 6–8) – double bass
- Han Bennink (disc 1, tracks 1–5) – drums
- Chris Cutler (disc 1, tracks 9–12) – drums
- Ahmed Compaore (disc 2, tracks 1–5) – drums
- Andrea Martignoni (disc 1, tracks 6–8; disc 2, tracks 1–5) – percussion
- Mario Martignoni (disc 1, tracks 6–8) – percussion
- Pino Urso (disc 1, tracks 6–8) – percussion
- Nicola Zonca (disc 1, tracks 6–8) – marimba
- Marco Dalpane (disc 1, tracks 6–8) – keyboards
- Fred Giuliani (disc 1, tracks 9–12) – samples
- Margareth Kammerer (disc 1, tracks 6–8) – voice
- Didier Roth (disc 1, tracks 1–5) – bricolage
- Massimo Simonini (disc 1, tracks 6–8) – records, CDs, Casio SK1
