= Jérôme Faucheur =

French organist and teacher

Jérôme Faucheur (born in 1953) is a French organist, improviser and Professor of Organ in the schools of Bondues, Comines and Hazebrouck as well as in the Institute of Sacred Music in Lille. He is titular of the organs in Bondues and Wambrechies.

== Biography ==
Jérôme Faucheur was born in 1953 in Lille, France. He won the gold medal for organ and improvisation in 1974 at the Conservatory of Lille, the first Prize in the Tournois du Royaume de la Musique, and holds the ‘Diplome Superieur d'Orgue’ from the Sacred Music Institute of Rouen. He is former student of Rolande Falcinelli.

He played almost 400 organ recitals in the America, Europe and Australia.
