= Learn to Talk =

Studio album by Skeleton Crew
- Released: 1984
- Recorded: December 1983 to January 1984
- Studio: Kirchberg, Switzerland
- Genre: Avant-rock; experimental
- Length: 41:37
- Label: Rift (US)
- Producer: Robert Vogel, Skeleton Crew

Skeleton Crew chronology
Learn to Talk (1984)	The Country of Blinds (1986)

Professional ratings
Review scores
Source	Rating
AllMusic	4/5 stars
Robert Christgau	B+

Learn to Talk is a studio album by American experimental rock band Skeleton Crew, recorded at Sunrise Studio, Kirchberg, Switzerland, between Christmas and New Year 1983/1984. It was their debut album and was released in 1984.

The album was recorded when Skeleton Crew was the duo of Fred Frith and Tom Cora. The band was best known for their improvised live performances, during which they played various instruments simultaneously. While the recordings are not live (except for two tracks), they do to a large extent convey the dynamics of the live act. The music is both sparse and raw, consisting of songs interspaced with cello, guitar and violin instrumental fragments. Tape cut-ups also feature throughout the album, including a Ronald Reagan speech, Sousa's "Washington Post" and TV ad clips.

The songs were composed or arranged by Frith and Cora, except for "The Way Things Fall (Back Apart)" which included lyrics by Rebby Sharp, who Frith had worked with in Orthotonics.

== Track listing ==
Side Free
No.	Title	Writer(s)	Length
1.	"Que Viva"	Cora, Frith	3:40
2.	"Onwards and Upwards"	Cora, Frith	3:39
3.	"The Way Things Fall (Back Apart)"	Cora, Frith, Sharp	2:35
4.	"Not My Shoes"	Cora, Frith	2:14
5.	"The Washington Post"	Sousa, arr. Skeleton Crew	1:28
6.	"We're Still Free"	Cora, Frith	4:16
7.	"Victoryville"	Cora, Frith	2:43

Side Dirt
No.	Title	Writer(s)	Length
8.	"Los Colitos"	trad. Ecuador, Cora, Frith	2:53
9.	"Life at the Top"	Frith	1:44
10.	"Learn to Talk"	Cora, Frith	3:40
11.	"Factory Song"	Cora, Frith	5:13
12.	"It's Fine"	Cora, Frith	4:22
13.	"Zach's Flag"	Cora	3:10

=== Track notes ===
- "Victoryville" was recorded live in December 1983 at the 1st Festival International de Musique Actuelle de Victoriaville in Victoriaville, Quebec, Canada (additional material from a malfunctioning tape-recorder which played both sides of the tape at once).
- Part of "Learn to Talk" recorded by CKRL in Quebec City.

== Personnel ==
- Tom Cora – cello, bass guitar, casio, drums, home-made drums and contraptions, singing
- Fred Frith – guitar, six-string bass, violin, casio, home-made bass, piano, drums, singing

=== Guests ===
- Röbl, Lu and Katrin – voices on "Los Colitos"

=== Sound and art work ===
- Robert Vogel – engineer, producer
- Fred Frith – engineer
- Skeleton Crew – producer
- Thomas Newbolt – cover art work

== CD reissues ==
In 1990 RecRec Music re-issued Learn to Talk together with Skeleton Crew's next album The Country of Blinds on a single compilation CD, Learn to Talk / Country of Blinds, omitting "Los Colitos" and "Life At The Top" from Learn to Talk, and "Money Crack" from The Country of Blinds.

In 2005 Fred Records re-issued Learn to Talk / Country of Blinds on a double compilation CD, omitting only "Money Crack" from The Country of Blinds, and adding ten extra tracks.
