= The Muffins =

American progressive rock/avant-jazz group

- Origin: United States
- Genres: Progressive rock, avant-garde jazz, free improvisation
- Years active: 1973–1981; 1998–2016
- Labels: Random Radar, Cuneiform
- Past members: Dave Newhouse; Billy Swann; Thomas Scott; Paul Sears; Michael Zentner; Stuart Abramowitz
- Website: www.themuffinsband.com

The Muffins were an American Maryland-based progressive rock/avant-jazz group. They were formed in Washington, DC in the early 1970s and recorded four albums before disbanding in 1981. In 1998 the group reformed and recorded a further five albums and a DVD. The Muffins played at Symphony Space on Broadway in NYC with Marion Brown in 1979, and also performed at a number of festivals, starting with the ZU Manifestival in New York City in 1978, The Villa Celimontana festival in Rome, Italy in 2000, two appearances at Progday in 2001 and 2002, NEARfest in 2005, and the "Rock in Opposition" festival in France in 2009. In 2010, the Muffins headlined at Progday, making a third appearance at this long running festival.

The Muffins are largely an instrumental band inspired and influenced by avant-garde jazz, progressive rock, 20th-century music, and the English Canterbury scene. They work in an "underground genre" Perfect Sound Forever called "the avant-garde side of latter-day US progressive jazz-rock", and place "the joy of creation over commercial concerns". The Rolling Stone Record Guide called them the "spiritual American cousins of Henry Cow and Soft Machine", and AllMusic described their music as a "unique blend of Canterbury progressive, fusion, improvisation and much more."

== History ==
In 1973, keyboardist and saxophonist Dave Newhouse, guitarist Michael Zentner and bassist Billy Swann, disillusioned with the state of American rock music at the time, decided to form their own group. They moved into a large farmhouse in Gaithersburg, Maryland they called the Buba Flirf house, (Note: When they moved into their house in Gaithersburg, Maryland they found some large marquee letters, and one of the few things they could spell with them was "Buba Flirf". Billy Swann nailed them to the front of the house and "Buba Flirf" became its name.) and turned for inspiration to a new "Canterbury" style of music (Soft Machine, Caravan and others) that was coming out of England at the time. In 1974, saxophonist Thomas Scott joined the group. Although Scott came from a classical and big-band jazz background, he also had an affinity for Soft Machine and other British progressive rock groups like Gentle Giant. After a succession of drummers, Stuart Abramowitz joined on drums in 1975, but left in July 1976, along with guitarist Zentner. The remaining trio decided to continue without a guitarist and drummer, and started exploring improvisation. In late 1976 they found an "adventurous" drummer Paul Sears, who not only relieved the other members from shared percussion duties, but also, according to Scott, "open[ed] the Muffins up."

With its membership now stable, the Muffins as a quartet began exploring "a unique sound in an instrumental setting", mixing improvisation with composed pieces. They drew on several styles, including the Canterbury scene and the experimental sound of the English avant-rock group Henry Cow. Henry Cow had a big impact on the band – Newhouse said that "Living in the Heart of the Beast" from their album In Praise of Learning "had a tremendous influence on me." During late 1975 and early 1976 the Muffins made a number of studio and home demos, but did not release them. Many, however, were later released on an album Chronometers by Cuneiform Records in 1993.

But the price for putting "the joy of creation over commercial concerns" made it difficult for the band to fit into the local Maryland/Virginia/D.C. music scene. Reaction to their performances was often indifferent, but they did slowly start to build up a "small-but-rabid cult following". In 1977 the Muffins moved to a new house in Rockville, Maryland, which they converted into a recording studio. They also established their own independent record label, Random Radar Records to release their own music and that of other "like-minded locals". In 1978 the Muffins released their first official album, Manna/Mirage, which received college radio airplay and generally "positive press". The New Gibraltar Encyclopedia of Progressive Rock called the album an American approach to the style of Henry Cow, and Chris Cutler and Fred Frith of Henry Cow apparently "liked it a lot". After Henry Cow disbanded in August 1978, Frith moved to New York City and later performed with the Muffins in Washington, D.C. In November 1979 Frith recorded with them as his backing band in Tom Scott's Rockville studio for his 1980 solo album, Gravity. He also produced and played on their next album, 185 in September 1980, which, Scott said, "[gave] us some new and interesting sounds, [and] a bit of credibility and international recognition that we were missing."

But after the lukewarm reaction 185 received, the Muffins decided to split up and go their own ways. Swann went on to play with the D.C.-based new wave band Urban Verbs, and Sears formed a progressive rock band, Chainsaw Jazz. Newhouse went on a European tour with Frith's new band Skeleton Crew as well as begin a second career as a school teacher, and Scott ran a recording studio.

=== Reunion ===
In the early 1990s the Muffins got back together briefly to play at a private party, and a recorded extract from their performance appeared on a 1995 Cuneiform Records compilation, Unsettled Scores. In 1998, realising that there was still a demand for their music, Newhouse, Swann, Scott and Sears decided to officially reform the Muffins. Cuneiform Records had already re-issued all their old albums on CDs, and released a collection of unreleased tracks on Open City, and their early studio and home demos on Chronometers. The band assembled at Sears's house and jammed and recorded a track for a new Cuneiform Records sampler, Unsettled Scores, where Cuneiform artists performed each other's music. Newhouse said "The chemistry was unbelievable. It was as if we had never stopped playing." They went on to record a new album, Bandwidth, followed two years later by another album, Double Negative. In 2002 the Muffins played at a progressive rock showcase at Orion Sound Studios in Baltimore, and the event was filmed and later released by the band on DVD as Live at Orion in 2003.

The Muffins also returned to performing live, including at the Villa Celimontana Jazz Festival in Rome in 2000, the Knitting Factory in New York City in 2001, Progday in North Carolina in 2001, and 2002 (introduced by legendary music impresario Giorgio Gomelsky), NEARfest in Pennsylvania in 2005, and the "Rock in Opposition" festival in France in 2009.

=== 2016 Break up ===
In April 2016, Sears announced that "the Muffins are no more", having played their final performance at Orion Sound Studios in mid-May 2015, for the filming of the Romantic Warriors III: Canterbury Tales documentary. However, he indicated that the four members will continue to work in various duo and trio combos for the foreseeable future. Additionally he stated that both recent and archival material will continue to see release by the quartet.

== Name ==
In 1973, soon after the band, at the time unnamed, had moved into the large farmhouse in Gaithersburg, Maryland, a friend arrived with a tray of blueberry muffins as a housewarming gift and shouted "The muffins are here!" Sounding like they were being introduced, the band adopted the name "the Muffins".

== Members ==
- Dave Newhouse – piano, organ, baritone and tenor saxophone, bass clarinet, percussion (1973–)
- Billy Swann – electric bass guitar, guitar, percussion, vocals (1973–)
- Michael Zentner – guitar, violin (1973–1976)
- Thomas Scott – keyboards, alto and soprano saxophone, alto and soprano clarinet, oboe, bassoon, cantor, trumpet, flute, percussion (1974–)
- Mike Apparetti – drums (1974)
- Michael Bass – drums, tuned percussion (1975)
- Stuart Abramowitz – drums (1975–1976)
- Paul Sears – drums, percussion, guitar, trombone (1976–)

== Discography ==
=== Albums ===
- Manna/Mirage (1978, LP, Random Radar Records, CD Cuneiform Records, US)
- Air Fiction (1979, LP) – live and home studio recordings of improvisations (Note: Air Friction was a limited edition LP of 1,000 copies sold exclusively to fans on the Muffins's mailing list at the time. Because the band was unhappy with this "hastily recorded and assembled" album, it was never reissued.)
- 185 (1981, LP, Random Radar Records, CD Cuneiform Records, US)
- Open City (1985, LP, CD Cuneiform Records, US) – a collection of unreleased tracks
- Secret Signals 1 (1989, privately distributed cassette of recordings 1974–1981)
- Secret Signals 2 (1992, privately distributed cassette)
- Chronometers (1993, CD, Cuneiform Records, US) – studio and home demos recorded in 1975 and 1976
- Secret Signals 3 (1996, privately distributed cassette)
- Loveletter #1 (2001, CD, Contorted Records, US) – outtakes and live performances (1999–2001) (Note: Loveletter #1 was a self-released CD prepared for and released at a ProgDay festival in North Carolina the Muffins performed at in 2001. Later a Japanese progressive label, Marquee purchased licensing to distribute the CD overseas.)
- Bandwidth (2002, CD, Cuneiform Records, US)
- Air Live (2002, CD)
- Double Negative (2004, CD, Cuneiform Records, US)
- Loveletter #2 (2005, CD, Hobart Films & Records, US) – outtakes and live performances
- Palindrome (2010, CD, Musea Records, France)
- Mother Tongue (2012, CD, Hobart Films & Records, US)
- Baker's Dozen (2022, CD, Cuneiform Records, US) – 12 CDs + DVD, all previously unreleased

=== Videos ===
- Live at Orion (2003, DVD)

=== Appears on ===
- Various artists: A Random Sampler (1977, LP, Random Radar Records, United States) – includes one Muffins track, "Leopards, Peacocks and Glass" later released on Chronometers
- Fred Frith: Gravity (1980, LP Ralph Records, United States) – the Muffins feature on side two of the LP
- Various artists: Recommended Records Sampler (1982, 2xLP, Recommended Records) – includes two extracts from Chronometers
- Various artists: Unsettled Scores (1995, CD, Cuneiform Records, United States) – includes one Muffins track
- Various artists: Cuneiform Progressive II (2002, CD Cuneiform Records, United States) – includes one Muffins track

== Filmography ==
- 2015: Romantic Warriors III: Canterbury Tales (DVD)
