= Jerry King (cartoonist) =

Cartoonist

Jerry King is a cartoonist. He was educated at The Ohio State University where he received a degree in English.

He has received the National Cartoonists Society Magazine Gag Cartoon Award for 2001 and was nominated for their Gag Cartoon Award and Magazine Gag Cartoon Award for 2002.

Jerry King has drawn cartoons for Playboy, USA Today Co., Inc owned The Independent and other publications and websites worldwide.
