= Skeleton Crew (band) =

American experimental rock and jazz group

- Skeleton Crew, 1982; Left to right: Tom Cora, Dave Newhouse, Fred Frith

Background information
- Origin: New York City, United States
- Genres: Avant-rock, experimental, free improvisation
- Years active: 1982–1986
- Label: Rift Records
- Spinoffs: Duck and Cover
- Past members: Tom Cora; Fred Frith; Dave Newhouse; Zeena Parkins

Skeleton Crew was an American experimental rock and jazz group from 1982 to 1986, comprising core members Fred Frith and Tom Cora, with Zeena Parkins joining later. Best known for their live improvisation performances where they played various instruments simultaneously, they also recorded two studio albums Learn to Talk (1984) and The Country of Blinds (1986). The group drew on music and themes from a number of sources, including world music, left-wing politics and pre-recorded tapes.

Writing in the Santa Cruz Sentinel, Lee Sherman described Skeleton Crew's sound as "unique and eclectic". In her 1990 book, Sonic Transports: New Frontiers in Our Music, Nicole V. Gagné called the group "one of the hottest and imaginative rock acts I've ever heard." In 2021, Frith said Skeleton Crew's stance was "sorta kinda demented anti-industry and even anti-music".

== Biography ==
After English guitarist Fred Frith's New York City band, Massacre disbanded in mid-1981, Frith and American cellist Tom Cora decided to form a quartet with ex-Massacre drummer Fred Maher and American guitarist Tim Schellenbaum. But before their first performance, Maher and Schellenbaum both suffered collapsed lungs within two weeks of each other, leaving Frith and Cora with the choice of continuing on their own or abandoning the project. They chose to continue, agreeing to play all the instruments themselves during live performances. Frith played guitar, violin, keyboards, bass drum and hi-hat, while Cora played cello, bass guitar, homemade drums and other contraptions enabling him to play instruments with his feet.

Performing like this was a challenge for them and made the resulting music unpredictable, but as an improvising duo, this pleased them. It gave rise to a rhythmic tension not present in a group with just one drummer. Frith said in a 1983 interview, "rhythmically, it throws up ways of playing that one person behind the drums just wouldn't be able to do, just in terms of coordination." He told DownBeat magazine in 1982: "It's all just on the edge of breaking down all the time, which is a quality that I've always liked. I don't like things to be too easy." One critic wrote that Skeleton Crew's performances were like a slowly sinking ship that somehow manages to return to port.

Gagné wrote that to make their live performances more challenging, Skeleton Crew played their roughly 50-minute sets with very few breaks, running most of their songs into one another. Gagné remarked that their sets were a blend of "folk music, fake music, noise, political songs, taped events", and they "kept the audience on its toes" wondering what was coming next. But she added that what really had the crowds cheering was for the band's "amazing technique", and that they could go on for so long. Even when things occasionally went wrong for the duo, equipment malfunctions, missed cues, falling out-of-step with each other, Gagné said the audiences still enthusiastically spurred the band on.

Skeleton Crew's first concert was at the M.A.K. Festival in Zürich in May 1982, but Frith and Cora asked Dave Newhouse of the Muffins to join them. Frith said "we lost our nerve" about whether we would be able to pull off our act as a duo, and we performed as a trio on our first tour. Newhouse left after the tour, but its success gave Frith and Cora the confidence to continue as a duo, and they performed over one hundred concerts in Europe, North America and Japan over the next eighteen months. In October 1983 they joined Duck and Cover, a commission from the Berlin Jazz Festival, for a performance in West Berlin, followed by another in February 1984 in East Berlin. In December 1983 Skeleton Crew performed at the 1st Festival International de Musique Actuelle de Victoriaville in Victoriaville, Quebec, Canada.

Later in 1984, Skeleton Crew began work on their first studio album Learn to Talk in Switzerland. The LP (with sides named "Side Free" and "Side Dirt") featured music that was both sparse and raw and consisted of cynical and humorous "songs" interspaced with cello, guitar and violin instrumental fragments. It conveyed the energy of their live performances. Tapes also featured throughout the album: Ronald Reagan saying "We're still free in America", cut-ups of Sousa's "Washington Post" and TV ad clips. Tapes had also become a part of their live act.

By now, Skeleton Crew had become "quite competent" with their two one-man-band act. Later in 1984, Zeena Parkins, playing electric harp, keyboards and percussion, joined the band and remained until the end. As a trio, they made their second studio album The Country of Blinds in 1986 (again in Switzerland and produced by ex-Henry Cow member Tim Hodgkinson). Here the music was richer and more rhythmical than their first album. The songs were more developed but the cynical edge of the first album remained. Soon after the recording sessions the group decided to split up. Frith explained why:

"We actually started to sound like a normal rock and roll band so it seemed kind of pointless to go on at that point."

Frith and Cora re-united again as Skeleton Crew in 1995 in the Netherlands at the Koeinverhuurbdrijf Studio, Purmerland to record a CD-ROM Etymology, a sound sample library of sonic sounds and wire manipulations. In 2021, Frith assembled Skeleton Crew's first live album, Free Dirt (Live), a double-CD of material taken from concerts recorded in Europe and North America between 1982 and 1986. It was released by Austrian record label, Klanggalerie in December 2021.

== Members ==
- Tom Cora – cello, bass guitar, Casio, accordion, drums, contraptions, singing (1982–1986)
- Fred Frith – guitar, 6-string bass guitar, violin, Casio, home-mades, drums, singing (1982–1986)
- Dave Newhouse – alto saxophone, percussion (1982)
- Zeena Parkins – organ, electric harp, accordion, drums, singing (1984–1986)

== Discography ==
=== Studio albums ===
- Learn to Talk (1984, LP, Rift Records, US)
- The Country of Blinds (1986, LP, Rift Records, US)

=== Live albums ===
- Free Dirt (Live) (2021, 2xCD, Klanggalerie, Austria)

=== Compilations ===
- Learn to Talk / Country of Blinds (1990, CD, RecRec Music, Switzerland)

=== CD-ROMs ===
- Etymology (1997, CD-ROM, Rarefaction Records, US) – audio source library

=== Other album appearances ===
- Various artists: Passed Normal, Vol.1 (1987, LP, FOT Records, US) – includes six Skeleton Crew tracks recorded live at Illinois State University, Normal on November 4, 1984.
- Various artists: Festival Mimi 86 (1987, LP, Oblique Musique, France) – includes one Skeleton Crew track recorded live at Saint-Rémy-de-Provence, France in July 1986.
- Fred Frith: Step Across the Border (1990, 2xLP, RecRec Music, Switzerland) – includes two Skeleton Crew tracks.
- Various artists: Hallelujah, Anyway – Remembering Tom Cora (1999, 2xCD, Tzadik Records, US) – includes two Skeleton Crew tracks.

== Works cited ==
- Gagné, Nicole V. (1990). Sonic Transports: New Frontiers in Our Music. De Falco Books. ISBN 978-0-9625145-0-0.
