= Ensemble Modern =

Contemporary music ensemble in Germany

- Ensemble for contemporary music
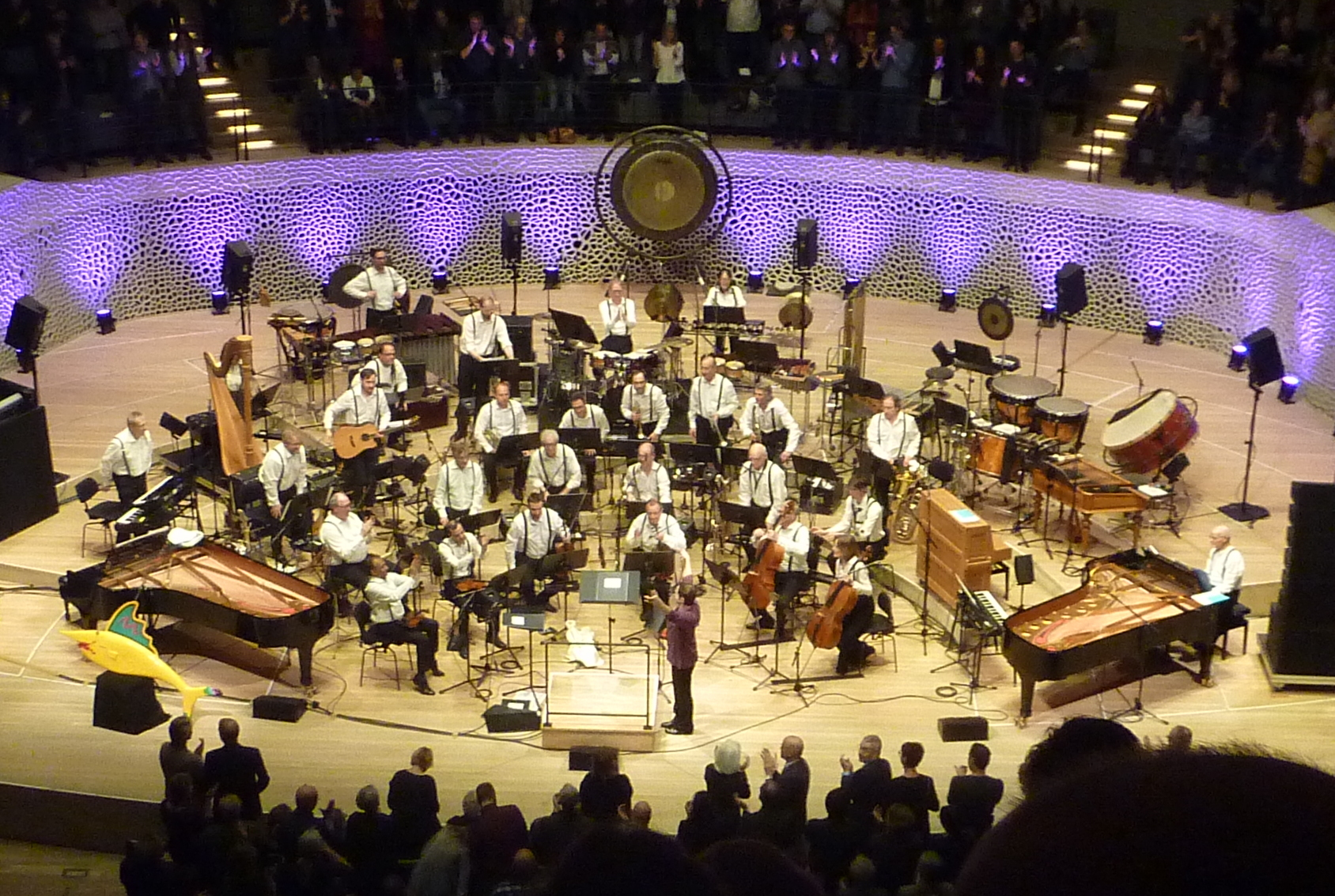
- Ensemble Modern in Hamburg, 2010
- Founded: 1980
- Location: Frankfurt, Hesse, Germany
- Website: www.ensemblemodern.com

Ensemble Modern is an international ensemble dedicated to performing and promoting the music of contemporary composers. Formed in 1980, the group is based in Frankfurt, Germany, and made up variously of about twenty members from numerous countries.

== History ==
Ensemble Modern was founded in 1980 by members of the Junge Deutsche Philharmonie. From the beginning, the ensemble chose to organize itself democratically. There is no artistic director or chief conductor; instead, all projects, productions and financial matters are decided and supported by the musicians directly. Currently, the ensemble combines 18 soloists from different backgrounds: Belgium, Bulgaria, Germany, Greece, India, Japan, Switzerland, and the United States.

Since 1985, Ensemble Modern has been based in Frankfurt am Main, Germany. They offer a subscription series at the Alte Oper Frankfurt, host regular opera productions in cooperation with the Oper Frankfurt. Since 1993, the Opera has held the "Happy New Ears" workshop series in which composers are invited to present and discuss their works. The programmatic scope of the ensemble includes music theatre, chamber music, orchestral music, as well as dance and video projects. Over the years, Ensemble Modern has had significant collaborations with many composers, including John Adams, George Benjamin, Hans Zender, Péter Eötvös, Heiner Goebbels, Friedrich Goldmann, Hans Werner Henze, Mauricio Kagel, Helmut Lachenmann, György Kurtág, György Ligeti, Steve Reich, Ryuichi Sakamoto, Karlheinz Stockhausen, and Frank Zappa.

Each year, Ensemble Modern gives approximately 100 concerts and an average of 70 new works, including about 20 premieres. The ensemble was declared a "Leuchtturm" or "Beacon" of contemporary culture in Germany by the German Federal Cultural Foundation in 2003. Various tours have taken the group to Africa, Australia, China, India, Japan, South Korea, South America, Taiwan, Russia and the United States. It is regularly represented at major festivals, including inter alia, the Salzburg Festival, Klangspuren in Schwaz, the Berliner Festspiele, the Lucerne Festival, the Festival d'Automne à Paris and the Festival Ars Musica in Brussels.

In 2003, the International Ensemble Modern Academy (IEMA) was founded. The Academy, in conjunction with the Frankfurt University of Music and Performing Arts (HfMDK), offers a one-year master's degree to composers, conductors, instrumentalists, and sound engineers. Additionally, IEMA provides scholarships, master classes, and various outreach programs.

== Members ==
Members of the Ensemble Modern are:

- Eva Böcker (cello)
- Jaan Bossier (clarinet)
- Paul Cannon (double bass)
- Uwe Dierksen (trombone)
- David Haller (percussion)
- Christian Hommel (oboe)
- Annie Jacobs-Perkins (cello)
- Megumi Kasakawa (viola)
- Hermann Kretzschmar (piano)
- Jagdish Mistry (violin)
- Thomas Adrian Mittler (horn)
- Norbert Ommer (sound director)
- Giorgos Panagiotidis (violin)
- Rainer Römer (percussion)
- Johannes Schwarz (bassoon)
- Sava Stoianov (trumpet)
- Dietmar Wiesner (flute)
- Ueli Wiget (piano)

Their current chief manager is Christian Fausch.

Former members include Ingo Metzmacher (piano), Peter Rundel (violin) and Franck Ollu (horn), now prominent conductors.

== Discography ==
Ensemble Modern is credited on over 170 recordings. Notable examples include:

- 1989: Anthony Braxton: 2 Compositions (Ensemble) 1989/1991 (hatART CD 6086)
- 1993: Frank Zappa: The Yellow Shark (Barking Pumpkin Records 21160572)
- 1993: Mauricio Kagel: Exotica (MusiKado AUL 66099)
- 1993: Conlon Nancarrow: Studies (RCA/BMG 09026 61180 2)
- 1995: Hans Zender: Schuberts Winterreise (RCA/BMG 09026 68067 2)
- 1996: Mark-Anthony Turnage: Blood on the Floor (DVD) (Arthaus Musik 100 430)
- 1997: John Cage: The Piano Concerts (mode 57)
- 1998: Steve Reich: Music For 18 Musicians (RCM/BMG 09026 68672 2)
- 1998: Hanns Eisler: Roaring Eisler (RCA/BMG 74321 56882 2)
- 1999: Charles Ives: Fourth Symphony (EM Medien EMCD-001)
- 1999: Kurt Weill, Bertolt Brecht: Die Dreigroschenoper (RCA/BMG 74321 6464 2)
- 2000: George Benjamin: Sudden Time/Three Inventions/Viola, Viola (Nimbus Records NI 5732)
- 2000: Fred Frith: Traffic Continues (Winter & Winter 910 044-2)
- 2001: Ludwig van Beethoven: Sinfonie Nr. 5 (BMC Records BMC CD 063)
- 2001: Emmanuel Nunes: Quodlibet (Montaigne 782055)
- 2002: Heiner Goebbels: Eislermaterial (ECM Records 1779 461 648-2)
- 2002: Helmut Lachenmann: Schwankungen am Rand (ECM Records 1798 461949-2)
- 2002: Steve Reich: City Life/New York Counterpoint/Eight Lines/Violin Phase (RCA/BMG 74321 66459 2)
- 2003: Frank Zappa: Greggery Peccary & Other Persuasions (RCA Records 82876 56061 2 RCA Red Seal)
- 2006: Morton Feldman: For Samuel Beckett (HatHutRecords hat[now]ART 142)
- 2006: György Kurtág: Complete Choral Works (Hänssler Klassik CD 93.174)
- 2007: Helmut Lachenmann: NUN (EM Medien EMCD-004)
- 2007: Helmut Lachenmann: Concertini/Kontrakadenz (EM Medien EMSACD-001)
- 2007: Steve Reich: City Life (DVD) (WMG B000O17184)
- 2008: Heiner Goebbels: Schwarz auf Weiß (DVD) (WERGO NZ71)
- 2008: George Benjamin: Into the Little Hill (Nimbus Records NI5828)
- 2009: Alva Noto + Ryuichi Sakamoto: utp_ (DVD) (Raster Noton r-n096)
- 2011: Ensemble Modern – Ernest Bour (EM Medien EMCD-017)
- 2012: Péter Eötvös and Patricia Kopatchinskaja: Bartók / Eötvös / Ligeti (Naïve V 5285)
- 2013: Hans Zender: 33 Veränderungen über 33 Veränderungen (EM Medien EMCD-020)
- 2019: Frederic D'Haene: Music with silent aitake's by Ensemble Modern and Reigakusha gagaku Ensemble (Parma Recordings)
- 2020: Beschenkt: 40 Miniaturen zum Jubiläum (EM Medien EMCD-048/49)

== Awards ==
Awards for the Ensemble Modern include:

- 1985: Prize of the French foreign minister on the occasion of the European Year of Music
- 1987: Prize of the Critics of "Verband der Komponisten und Musikwissenschaftler der DDR" for excellent interpretation during the Music Biennale in Berlin
- 1987: The German Record Critics' Award, Quarterly Critics' Choice 4/1987: Wolfgang Rihm – "umsungen", Peter Ruzicka – "...der die Gesänge zerschlug" (Dietrich Fischer-Dieskau, baritone; Ernest Bour, conductor)
- 1987: Schneider-Schott Music Prize Mainz
- 1989: Berlin Prize of the Critics of the "Verband deutscher Kritiker" in the category of music, awards ceremony at the Academy of the Arts
- 1992: "Hessischer Kulturpreis" 1992 from the state of Hesse in the category "cultural mediation" for the interpretation of modern music
- 1993: The German Record Critics' Award, Quarterly Critics' Choice 4/1993: György Kurtág – Song Cycles (Ensemble Modern/Peter Eötvös)
- 1993: Grammy nomination. The National Academy of Recording Arts and Sciences nominates the CD "Ives: A Portrait of Charles Ives" of the Ensemble Modern and Ingo Metzmacher as the best orchestral recording
- 1994: "Kunstpreis Berlin" – Jubiläumsstiftung 1848/1948
- 1994: Förderpreis Musik, awards ceremony at the Academy of the Arts in Berlin
- 1995: Stern der Woche, Abendzeitung, for the week 19–26 May 1995, Ensemble Modern under the direction of Peter Eötvös in the course of Dance 95 (Muffathalle, Munich)
- 1996: 1st "Binding Culture Prize"
- 1997: Grammy Nomination (National Academy of Recording Arts & Sciences) for best small ensemble performance for: "John Adams: Chamber Symphony/Shaker Loops/Phrygian Gates" (Sian Edwards, conductor)
- 1997: ECHO: German Record Award. Ensemble of the year with the recording "Fighting the waves" of George Antheil under the direction of HK Gruber
- 1998: Prize of the Spanish theatre critics "best foreign production" 1998 for ›Black on White‹ by Heiner Goebbels
- 2000: The German Record Critics' Award – Quarterly Critics' Choice 1/2000: Threepenny Opera by Kurt Weill conducted by HK Gruber
- 2000: 3rd prize of ›Scala‹ magazine in the category ›crossover vocal work‹
- 2004: ECHO Klassik: German Record Award, in the category "best ensemble / orchestra" and "best recording of chamber music" for the CD Ensemble Modern plays Frank Zappa Greggery Peccary & Other Persuasions
- 2006: Awarded "Artist of the Year" at Beijing Music Festival
- 2007: Winner of the Landmarks in the Land of Ideas, Germany, 2007.
- 2009: The Internationale Ensemble Modern Akademie receives the Praetorius Music Prize Lower Saxony in the category "music innovation"
- 2009: The Siemens AG awarded the ›Kulturförderpreis 2009‹ for "into…", a project of Ensemble Modern and Siemens Arts Program in collaboration with the Goethe-Institut
- 2014: Grammy nomination (National Academy of Recording Arts & Sciences) for best classical instrumental solo for "Bartók, Eötvös & Ligeti" with Patricia Kopatchinskaja, violin; Peter Eötvös, conductor (Ensemble Modern & Frankfurt Radio Symphony Orchestra)
- 2021: Opus Klassik: German music prize. "Ensemble / Orchestra of the Year" for the double-CD Beschenkt: 40 Miniaturen zum Jubiläum.
- 2024: Venice Biennale: Silver Lion for music

== In film ==
- Leidenschaft Neue Musik. Über Vielfalt und Freiheiten im Ensemble Modern. (Passion for New Music. On Diversity and Freedom in Ensemble Modern.) Documentary, Germany, 2011, 27:40 Min., Direction: Joachim Meißner und Marion Morawek, Production: Hessischer Rundfunk, Series: wissen und mehr, Premiere: 20 March 2012 on hr-Fernsehen, Contents from ARD, online-Video available until 10 March 2016.
- Wenn die Bühne brennt ... Ein Porträt des Ensemble Modern. (When the Stage is on Fire... A Portrait of Ensemble Modern.) Documentary, Germany, 2011, 53:20 Min., Direction: Manfred Scheyko, Production: Hessischer Rundfunk, arte, Premiere: 5 December 2011 on arte, Contents from Musik Heute.
- Ensemble Modern - Why We Play. Documentary, Germany, 2026, 90 Min. Direction: Thorsten Schütte.
