= Kazutoki Umezu =

Kazutoki Umezu 梅津和時
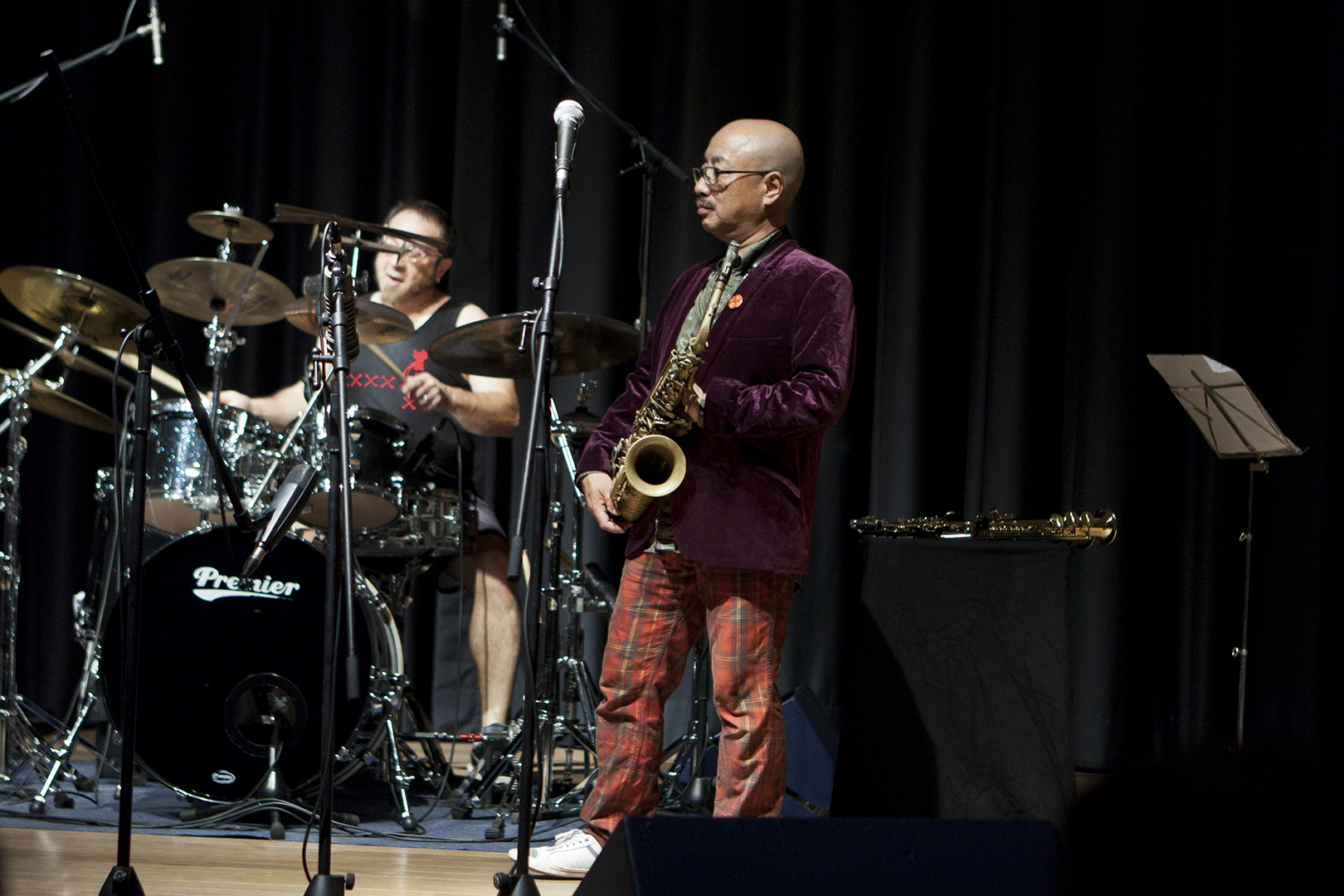
- Kazutoki Umezu at Cologne, September 2012

Background information
- Born: October 17, 1949 (age 76)
- Origin: Sendai, Miyagi, Japan
- Genres: Jazz, Free jazz, Klezmer
- Occupations: Musician, Composer
- Instruments: Alto Saxophone, Soprano saxophone, Bass clarinet
- Website: site u-shi

Kazutoki Umezu (梅津和時, Umezu Kazutoki; born October 17, 1949 in Sendai, Miyagi Prefecture) is a Japanese jazz saxophonist.

He has performed with Tom Cora, Samm Bennett, Ruins, Michiyo Yagi and Susumu Hirasawa.
