= Zeena Parkins =

American musician

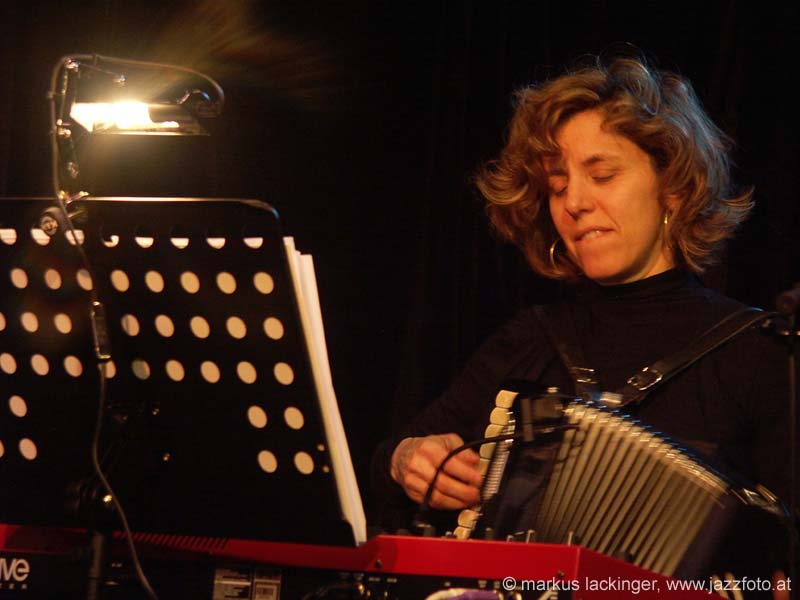
- Parkins on April 5, 2008

Background information
- Born: 1956 (age 69–70); Detroit, Michigan, U.S.
- Genres: Experimental; free improvisation; avant-garde
- Occupations: Musician; composer
- Instruments: Harp; accordion; keyboards; omnichord
- Years active: 1980s–present
- Labels: Tzadik; Good Child Music; Relative Pitch; Table of the Elements; Case Study Records
- Website: www.zeenaparkins.com

Zeena Parkins (born 1956) is an American composer and multi-instrumentalist active in experimental, free improvised, contemporary classical, and avant-jazz music; she is known for having "reinvented the harp". Parkins performs on standard harps, several custom electric harps, piano, and accordion. She was a 2019 Guggenheim Fellow and professor in the Music Department at Mills College.

== Life and career ==
Born in 1956 in Detroit, Michigan, Parkins studied at Bard College and moved to New York City in 1984. Her work ranges from solo performance to large ensembles. Besides standard and electric harps, her work also incorporates Foley, field recordings, analog synthesizers, samplers, oscillators and homemade instruments.

She has recorded six solo harp records and recorded and performed with Björk, Matmos, Ikue Mori, Fred Frith, Tom Cora, Christian Marclay, Yoko Ono, John Zorn (including in Cobra performances), Chris Cutler, Pauline Oliveros, Nels Cline, Elliott Sharp, Lee Ranaldo, Butch Morris, Tin Hat Trio, William Winant, Anthony Braxton, Bobby Previte, Courtney Love's band Hole, and others. She has also been a member of a number of experimental rock bands, including No Safety, News from Babel, and Skeleton Crew.

Parkins worked with dance companies and choreographers, including the John Jasperse Company, Jennifer Monson, Neil Greenberg, and Emmanuelle Vo-Dinh, and has won three Bessie Awards for her achievement in composition for dance.

She provided scores for filmmakers including Abigail Child, Isabella Rossellini, and Cynthia Madansky.

Parkins received a 1997 Foundation for Contemporary Arts Grants to Artists Award.

== Discography ==
=== As leader ===
Release year	Title	Label	Additional personnel
1987	Something Out There	No Man's Land	Sam Bennett, Cora, Wayne Horvitz, Christian Marclay, Jim Mineses, Ikue Mori, James Staley
1992	Ursa's Door	Les Disques Victo	Mori, Chris Cochrane, Sara Parkins, Maggie Parkins
1993	Nightmare Alley	Table of the Elements	
1995	Isabelle	Avant	S. Parkins, M. Parkins, Lisa Crowder
1996	Mouth=Maul=Betrayer	Tzadik	S. Parkins, M. Parkins, Mark Stewart, Jim Pugliese ft. Carsten Dane, Mattthias Breitenbach, Andy Hass
1998	No Way Back	Atavistic	
1999	The Opium War: A Radio Play	Einstein Records	Text by Ana María Simo; ft. M. Parkins, Ikue Mori, Joe Trump, Cochrane, David Shea, DJ Olive, DD Dorvillier, Jonathan Bepler, Tenko
1999	Pan-Acousticon	Tzadik	S. Parkins, M. Parkins, Stewart, Pugliese, ft. Trump
2004	Devotion	Table of the Elements	
2006	Necklace	Tzadik	Doug Henderson, Eclipse Quartet: S. Parkins, Sara Thorblade, Joanna Hood, M. Parkins
2010	Between the Whiles	Table of the Elements	luciana achugar, Levi Gonzalez, Eleanor Hullihan, S. Parkins, Pugliese
2012	Double Dupe Down	Tzadik	Mori, Marclay, Shelley Hirsch, Okkyung Lee, S. Parkins, M. Parkins, Staley, Matthew Welch, David Watson, William Winant, Pugliese
2013	The Adorables	Crytogramophone	Parkins, Shayna Dunkelman, Preshish Moments, ft. Deep Singh, Dave Sharma, Kristin Slipp, Danny Blume
2016	Three Harps, Tuning Forks & Electronics	Good Child Music	Nuiko Wadden, Kristen Theriault, Megan Conley ft. Mori
2018	Captiva	Good Child Music	Matthew Ostrowski

=== Collaborations ===
with News from Babel

- Work Resumed on the Tower (Recommended, 1984); Parkins, Chris Cutler, Lindsay Cooper, Dagmar Krause
- Letters Home (Recommended, 1986); Parkins, Cutler, Cooper, Krause ft. Robert Wyatt, Dagmar Krause, Sally Potter, Phil Minton

with Ikue Mori

- Parkins & Mori, Phantom Orchard (Mego, 2004)
- Phantom Orchard, Orra (Tzadik, 2008); ft. Cyro Baptista, Makigami Koichi, Josh Quillen, Maja Solveig Kjelstrup Ratkje
- Phantom Orchard Orchestra, Trouble In Paradise (Tzadik, 2012); ft. Sara Parkins, Shayna Dunkelman, Ratkje, Maggie Parkins, Hild Sofie Tafjord
- Phantom Orchard Ensemble, Through the Looking Glass (Tzadik, 2014); ft. Sylvie Courvoisier, S. Parkins, Ratkje, M. Parkins

with No Safety

- This Lost Leg (RecRec Music, 1989); Parkins, Chris Cochrane, Doug Seidel, Ann Rupel, Pippin Branett
- Spill (Knitting Factory Works, 1992); Parkins, Cochrane, Seidel, Rupel, Tim Spelios
- Live at the Knitting Factory (Knitting Factory Works, 1993); Parkins, Cochrane, Seidel, Rupel, Spelios
- Live in Italy (Cuneiform Records, 2021)

with Elliott Sharp

- Elliott Sharp / Zeena Parkins, Psycho–Acoustic (Victo, 1994)
- Psycho-Acoustic, Blackburst (Victo, 1996)

with Skeleton Crew

- The Country of Blinds (Rift, 1986); Parkins, Fred Frith, Tom Cora
- Free Dirt (Live) (Klanggalerie, 2021); Parkins, Frith, Cora

Other collaborations

- OWT (Parkins & David Linton), Good As Gold (Homestead Records, 1989)
- Joane Hétu / Diane Labrosse / Parkins / Danielle P. Roger / Tenko, La Légende De La Pluie (Ambiances Magnétiques, 1992)
- William Hooker / Lee Ranaldo / Parkins, The Gift Of Tongues (Knitting Factory Works, 1995)
- Chris Cutler / Parkins, Shark! (Megacorp, 1999)
- Parkins / Nels Cline / Thurston Moore, Live At Easthampton Town Hall (JMZ, 2001)
- Weightless Animals (Parkins, Kaffe Matthews, Mandy McIntosh), Weightless Animals (Annette Works, 2004)
- Parkins, Frederic Rzewski, James Tenney, Music for String Quartet & Percussion (New World Records, 2013); with Eclipse Quartet (S. Parkins, Sarah Thornblade, Alma Lisa Fernandez, M. Parkins) and William Winant
- Parkins / Pauline Oliveros, Presença Series #01 (Lucky Kitchen / Fundação de Serralves, 2015)
- MZM (Myra Melford, Parkins, Miya Masaoka), MZM (Infrequent Seams, 2017)
- Green Dome (Parkins, Ryan Sawyer, Ryan Ross Smith), Thinking in Stitches (Case Study Records, 2019)
- Parkins / Brian Chase, Live at San Damiano Mission (Chaikin Records / Case Study Records, 2019)
- Parkins / Wobbly, Triplicates (Relative Pitch Records, 2019)
- Parkins / Jeff Kolar, SCALE (Two Rooms, 2019)
- Parkins / Mette Rasmussen / Ryan Sawyer, Glass Triangle (Relative Pitch, 2021)

=== As instrumentalist ===
Parkins performing in Knoxville, TN, 2025

With Björk

- Vespertine (One Little Indian, 2001)
- Drawing Restraint 9 (One Little Indian, 2005)
- Biophilia (One Little Indian, 2011)

With Alex Cline

- For People in Sorrow (Cryptogramophone, 2013)

With Nels Cline

- The Inkling (Cryptogramophone, 2000)
- Destroy All Nels Cline (Atavistic, 2001)
- Macroscope (Mack Avenue, 2014)
- Lovers (Blue Note, 2016)

With Fred Frith

- The Country of Blinds (Rift, 1986) as Skeleton Crew
- Step Across the Border (RecRec, 1990)
- That House We Lived In (Fred, 1991 [2003])
- Stone, Brick, Glass, Wood, Wire (I Dischi di Angelica, 1999)
- Traffic Continues (Winter & Winter, 2000) with Ensemble Modern
- Ragged Atlas (Intakt, 2010) as Cosa Brava
- The Letter (Intakt, 2012) as Cosa Brava
- Z Sides (Klanggalerie, 2024) as Cosa Brava

With Maybe Monday

- Unsquare (Intakt, 2008)

With Yoko Ono

- Blueprint for a Sunrise (Capitol, 2001)

With Marc Ribot

- Requiem for What's His Name (Les Disques du Crépuscule, 1992)

With John Zorn

- Cobra (Hat Hut, 1987)
- John Zorn's Cobra: Live at the Knitting Factory (Knitting Factory, 1997)
- The Bribe (Tzadik, 1998)

With Tin Hat Trio

- Book of Silk (Ropeadope/Rykodisc, 2004)

With Bobby Previte

- Terminals (Cantaloupe, 2014)
