= Tom Cora =

American cellist and composer

- Cora at the Moers Jazz Festival, 1997

Background information
- Born: Thomas Henry Corra; September 14, 1953; Yancey Mills, Virginia, U.S.
- Died: April 9, 1998 (aged 44) Draguignan, France
- Genres: Jazz, avant-rock, experimental, free improvisation
- Occupations: Musician, composer
- Instrument: Cello
- Years active: 1979–1998
- Labels: No Man's Land, Sound Aspects
- Formerly of: Skeleton Crew, The Ex, Curlew, Third Person, Roof

Thomas Henry Corra (September 14, 1953 – April 9, 1998), better known as Tom Cora, was an American cellist and composer, best known for his improvisational performances in the field of experimental jazz and rock. He recorded with John Zorn, Butch Morris, and the Ex, and was a member of Curlew, Third Person and Skeleton Crew.

== Biography ==
Tom Cora was born in Yancey Mills, Virginia, United States. He made his musical debut as drummer on a local television program and in the mid-1970s he played guitar for a Washington, D.C. jazz club house band. He took up the cello while an undergraduate at the University of Virginia and studied with cellist Pablo Casals' student Luis Garcia-Renart and later with vibraphonist Karl Berger. During this time he formed his own group, the Moose Skowron Tuned Metal Ensemble and began constructing instruments for it.

In 1979 Cora moved to New York City, where he worked with Shockabilly guitarist Eugene Chadbourne, introducing the cello to the honky tonk circuits of North America. He performed at improvising clubs and venues in New York with John Zorn, Fred Frith, Andrea Centazzo, Butch Morris, Wayne Horvitz, David Moss, Toshinori Kondo and others. Cora also collaborated with George Cartwright and Bill Laswell which led to the formation of the art rock band Curlew in 1979. Cora remained with Curlew for over ten years and appeared on five of their albums.

In 1982 Tom Cora and Fred Frith formed Skeleton Crew, an improvising rock and jazz band best known for their live performances where they played various instruments simultaneously. Cora and Frith were each one-man bands on stage and for their act, Cora constructed musical contraptions he could play with his feet. The band existed for five years during which time they toured Europe, North America and Japan extensively. They made two studio albums, Learn to Talk (1984) and The Country of Blinds (1986), the latter with Zeena Parkins who had joined the band in 1984. In October 1983 Skeleton Crew joined Duck and Cover, a commission from the Berlin Jazz Festival, for a performance in West Berlin, followed by another in February 1984 in East Berlin.

Cora was also a member of the improvising trio Third Person, formed in 1990 as a live collaboration with percussionist Samm Bennett and a "third person" who changed from concert to concert. Two CDs of some of their performances were released, The Bends in 1991 (with "third persons" Don Byron, George Cartwright, Chris Cochrane, Nic Collins, Catherine Jauniaux, Myra Melford, Zeena Parkins, and Marc Ribot) and Luck Water in 1995 (with "third person" Kazutoki Umezu).

Cora performing with the Ex.

Cora performed with a number of other bands, including Nimal with Momo Rossel and post-rock quartet Roof. In 1990, he played two concerts with Dutch anarcho-punk band, the Ex, and the success of this collaboration resulted in Cora performing hundreds of concerts with the Ex and appearing on two of their albums. In 1995 in The Netherlands, Cora and Frith collaborated, as Skeleton Crew, on Etymology, a CD-ROM sound sample library of sonic sounds and wire manipulations.

Tom Cora died of melanoma at the age of 44 in a hospital in the south of France, where he lived with his wife, singer Catherine Jauniaux, and their son, Elia Corra.

A month after Cora's death, a benefit concert in aid of his family was held at the Knitting Factory with appearances by Catherine Jauniaux, Fred Frith, George Cartwright, Zeena Parkins and others. A CD of this concert, It's a Brand New Day – Live at the Knitting Factory, produced by John Zorn, was released on Knitting Factory Records in 2000. But the good intentions of all concerned were never realised when Knitting Factory Records was bought out and Jauniaux received no royalties from the sale of the CD.

John Zorn also compiled Hallelujah, Anyway – Remembering Tom Cora, a two-CD set featuring a selection of recordings by Cora and some of the groups he recorded with, plus new recordings of Cora's compositions.

Cora appeared in Nicolas Humbert and Werner Penzel's 1990 documentary film on Fred Frith, Step Across the Border, in which Cora and Frith are filmed rehearsing at The Kitchen, New York City in February 1989.

=== Solo work ===
In addition to performing with other bands and musicians, Cora began a solo concert career in 1986. The prospect of managing a concert-length performance single-handedly was a challenge with risks, but he learned to balance risk with intention and the results were solo performances across North America, Europe and Japan. Two live albums from some of these performances were released in 1987 and 1991.

While in The Netherlands, Cora spent two months at STEIM, the electro-acoustic research centre in Amsterdam, where he tailored a live sampling and triggering system to be played with his feet. He unveiled the system in a 25 concert solo tour in 1992. Unfortunately, the unique tailor-made instrument constructed at STEIM was later lost, forgotten on a train from Neuchâtel to La Chaux-de-Fonds while touring Switzerland.

Besides performing, Cora composed music for the National Film Board of Canada, choreographer Donna Uchizono (for which he received a New York Dance and Performance Award in 1990), and a solo cello film score for Dziga Vertov's, Man with the Movie Camera, commissioned by the American Museum of the Moving Image. In 1994 Cora was awarded a Meet the Composer Commissioning Grant to compose an ensemble score for Man with the Movie Camera. It was performed at several North American venues and in Europe in 1996.

=== Technique ===
Tom Cora's cello was prepared, electronically modified and highly amplified. He developed the style of playing sawed chords and percussive riffs as if his cello was an electric guitar. He banged, scraped and twisted it and did whatever else was necessary to produce the sounds he wanted.

Cora explored non-idiomatic improvising and studied Turkish and Eastern European folk music. The influence of this folk music is evident in much of his work. Skeleton Crew once devoted an entire concert to playing only Eastern European folk tunes.

On the stage, his presence was striking. Ed Baxter noted in his biography of Tom Cora:

With his saturnine good looks and gaunt demeanour, he brought a hint of American Gothic to the ever-shifting cartoon soundtrack of the downtown scene. Poised over his instrument and more often than not with all four limbs busy playing something, his was a compelling stage presence.

== Discography ==
Solo

- Live at the Western Front (1987, No Man's Land)
- Gumption in Limbo (1991, Sound Aspects)

Curlew

- Curlew (1981, Landslide)
- North America (1985, Moers)
- Live in Berlin (1988, Cuneiform)
- Bee (1991, Cuneiform)
- A Beautiful Western Saddle (1993, Cuneiform)

Skeleton Crew

- Learn to Talk (1984, Rift)
- The Country of Blinds (1986, Rift)
- Learn to Talk / Country of Blinds (1990, RecRec)
- Etymology (1997, Rarefaction)
- Free Dirt (Live) (2021, Klanggalerie)

The Ex

- Scrabbling at the Lock (1991, RecRec)
- And the Weathermen Shrug Their Shoulders (1993, RecRec)

Roof

- The Untraceable Cigar (1996, Red Note)
- Trace (1999, Red Note)

Third Person

- The Bends (1991, Knitting Factory)
- Lucky Water (1995, Knitting Factory)

With others

- Andrea Centazzo: Environment for Sextet (1979, Ictus)
- Eugene Chadbourne: 2000 Statues and the English Channel (1979, Parachute)
- John Zorn: Archery (1982, Parachute)
- Tom Cora and David Moss: Cargo Cult Revival (1983, Rift)
- Ferdinand Richard: En Avant (1983, RecRec)
- Duck and Cover: Re Records Quarterly Vol.1 No.2 (1985, Recommended)
- Tom Cora and Hans Reichel: Angel Carver: Live in Milwaukee and Chicago (1989, FMP)
- Rene Lussier: Le tresor de la langue (1989, Ambiances Magnétiques)
- Nimal: Voix de Surface (1990, RecRec)
- The Hat Shoes: Differently Desperate (1991, RecRec)
- Tetsuhiro Daiku: Yunta & Jiraba (1993, Disc Akabana)
- Richard Teitelbaum: Cyberband (1994, Moers)
- Kazutoki Umezu: First Deserter (1995, Off Note)
- Fred Frith: Allies (Music for Dance volume 2) (1996, RecRec)
- Butch Morris: Testament: A Conduction Collection (1996, New World)
- Tom Cora and various artists: Hallelujah, Anyway – Remembering Tom Cora (1999, Tzadik)
- Tom Cora, Chris Cutler and Fred Frith: Live in Tel Aviv and Aubervilliers (2021, Fred Records) (Note: A limited edition bonus CD included in the Fred Records Story box set.)
- Buga Up (band with Tom Cora, Guigou Chenevier and Chris Cohade): A Quick Morsel of Energy (Live à Vandoeuvre 1987) (2021, Thödol Records)
