= Duo Goebbels/Harth =

- From the left: Heiner Goebbels, Alfred Harth

Background information
- Origin: Frankfurt, Germany
- Years active: 1975–1988
- Labels: FMP, Recommended Records, Riskant
- Members: Heiner Goebbels, Alfred 23 Harth

The Duo Goebbels/Harth (1975–1988)—combining German composer, music-theatre director and keyboardist Heiner Goebbels and German composer, multi-media artist and saxophonist Alfred 23 Harth—became famous for its adaptation of and departure from European composers, especially Hanns Eisler, implemented in a provocatively fresh manner into structured free improvisations and deploying content from areas beyond music. The duo was nicknamed the “Eisler brothers” by music critic W. Liefland. They later also experimented with different genres and sound collages, including electronic devices. The duo played in many international festivals and concerts in cities as diverse as Tel Aviv, Zagreb, West and East Berlin and South America.

== History and music ==
Before the duo started, Heiner Goebbels especially admired the capabilities of Don Cherry, with whom about 15 years later he engaged in his project Der Mann im Fahrstuhl, adapted from Heiner Müller. In 1972, Goebbels moved from Landau to Frankfurt/Main to study sociology and complete a work on the German/Austrian composer Hanns Eisler. Meanwhile, Alfred 23 Harth was finishing his degree as an art teacher at the university in Frankfurt/Main, as well as his conscientious objector's civilian service in 1973–4, and in 1975 returned after three months of activity playing with the loft jazz scene in New York City (with Jay Clayton, John Fischer and Perry Robinson). Previously, he had formed the groups Just Music (1967–72) and E.M.T. (1972–74). He was then searching new musical companionship in the local Frankfurt music scene and joined a jazz-rock band comprising Goebbels on keyboards and drummer Uwe Schmitt, later in Gestalt et Jive, that shortly after broke apart while leaving some previously booked concerts open. Harth encouraged Goebbels to play one of the remaining concerts, freely improvising in a duo with him. They exchanged information, and during a rehearsal Harth played the melody of some Eisler songs on saxophone, which Goebbels accompanied on the piano. They continued improvising freely, thematically deconstructing Eisler's music just to have it emerge again in a twisted manner. They also extended the range of their instruments.

A first Duo Goebbels/Harth concert took place in 1975 at a special event for artist friends in Frankfurt/Main. Goebbels and Harth played their fresh repertoire of music at the "1.Ersatzausstellung" by Vollrad Kutscher and Stephan Keller, from which photographs found their way to covers of the later LPs and CDs of the duo Goebbels/Harth. Christoph Anders, a later member of the wind band Sogenanntes Linksradikales Blasorchester and Cassiber, was in the audience and since then became a friend to the two musicians. The enthusiastic reaction of the audience to their humorous and skilled diversity led to more concerts for the newly formed duo Goebbels/Harth. Soon they contacted Jost Gebers from FMP, whom Harth knew from his LP production with E.M.T., and arranged a live recording session at the "Flöz" in 1976 in West Berlin, which emerged as the LP Vier Fäuste für Hanns Eisler, which boosted the duo's recognition. The same year, Goebbels started formal music studies at the Hochschule für Musik und Darstellende Kunst Frankfurt am Main.

In 1978 the duo played at the Deutsches Jazzfestival Frankfurt and started to work on a second LP, Vom Sprengen des Gartens, for SAJ/FMP (1979), where they also worked in a manner removed from their European heritage by implementing ideas from German composers, such as Bach and Schumann, in their free improvisations. Joachim-Ernst Berendt called this LP "one of the most important German jazz LPs in the 1970s." Around 1978–79, Goebbels and Harth started to compose for the theatre as well as film music for German director Helke Sander.

In 1981, Berendt and the duo produced the LP Zeit wird knapp by including love poems and ballads from Bertolt Brecht, for which they recruited vocalists Dagmar Krause and Ernst Stötzner. The duo then artistically shaped the German new wave music/Neue Deutsche Welle in their style with their LPs Indianer Für Morgn and Frankfurt/Peking by also using synthesizer, electronic devices, and extended instruments. They made a short adaption of the Revolutionary opera Pekinese, which in 1996 led Japanese avant-garde musician Otomo Yoshihide to incorporate samples of it into a project with his group Ground Zero. The duo then carried out two tours to South America with the help of the Goethe Institute.

Around 1983–84, the creative spirit of the pair diminished. In 1987, Harth had been playing reeds and brass instruments in Goebbels’ performance Der Mann im Fahrstuhl at the Festival International de Musique Actuelle de Victoriaville in Victoriaville, Quebec, Canada (together with Arto Lindsay and Heiner Müller). At the same festival, a final significant Goebbels/Harth event took place through a live recording, which became a kind of synopsis of the duo's entire repertoire over its long history. After a few more duo events and the unreleased last recordings “Duos für Fritz,” Harth disbanded the duo in 1988.

In 1991 together with Akashi Masanori (evva), Harth produced the best-of CD Goebbels Heart, for which he had asked artist and writer friend Wolf Pehlke to put his image from the book of art works, "Goebbels Heart" (1986), on the CD cover to symbolize that the duo's work had been definitively concluded.

In 2007 Harth and Chris Cutler produced the CD reissue of the two first duo LPs. In 2020 the duo's Revolutionary opera Pekinese together with Otomo Yoshihide's group Ground Zero was released on vinyl in France.

== Other activities ==
- So-Called Left-Radical Brass Band / "Sogenanntes Linksradikales Blasorchester" (SLB) (1976–1981)

In 1976 Goebbels and Harth put an orchestra together that was designed to play mainly in the streets during the then political demonstrations of the left-radical German student movement to add colour to their activities.

- Film music for Der subjective Faktor and Der Beginn aller Schrecken ist Liebe by Helke Sander (1980–81)
- The music theatre "Abrazzo Oper" in 1981 with actor Peter Franke, Goebbels, Harth, Johannes Krämer from Just Music, Rolf Riehm (SLB), Annemarie Roelofs (from Harth's LP project Es herrscht Uhu im Land in 1980) and Uwe Schmitt, for which the duo composed together with Riehm
- The avant-rock group Cassiber with Christoph Anders, Chris Cutler, Goebbels, Harth
- The avant-rock group Cassix in cooperation with Stormy Six (Rock in Opposition), 1983
- The avant-rock septet Duck and Cover in 1983
- Theatre music for Kiebich und Dutz and Die Reise nach Aschenfeld with F.K. Waechter. Die Reise nach Aschenfeld had been performed 25 times live by the duo at the Residenztheater in Munich in 1984-85

== Discography (selection) ==
- Vier Fäuste für Hanns Eisler, FMP, Germany, 1976 + Recommended Records, U.K., 2007
- Vom Sprengen des Gartens, FMP, Germany, 1979 + Recommended Records, U.K., 2007
- Der Durchdrungene Mensch / Indianer Für Morgen, Riskant, Germany, 1981, Deutscher Schallplattenpreis
- Zeit wird knapp, Riskant, Germany, 1981
- Frankfurt - Peking, Riskant, Germany, 1984
- Live in Victoriaville, victo, Canada. 1987
- Goebbels Heart, evva, Japan, 1992
- Musik in Deutschland 1950-2000 a) Musik für Schauspiel, BMG, Germany, 2001
