= Vladimir Estragon =

German rock group

- Origin: Germany
- Genres: Avant-rock
- Years active: 1988–1989
- Labels: Enja/TipToe
- Past members: FM Einheit; Ulrike Haage; Alfred Harth; Phil Minton

Vladimir Estragon were an avant-rock group founded in West Germany in 1988 by German composer and reed player Alfred Harth with FM Einheit, Ulrike Haage, and Phil Minton (UK). In 1980 Harth produced the LP Es herrscht Uhu im Land on JAPO/ECM with the idea of integrating punk rock, free jazz and classical music and followed this design throughout the 80s in the groups Cassiber, Duck and Cover, Gestalt et Jive and Vladimir Estragon.Vladimir Estragon were using electronic arrangements whose preset-derived poetry was poisoned by oblique complexities and sudden animations entering the picture when less expected.

Vladimir Estragon performed their postmodern program during the years 1988–1989 as well as on the Berlin Jazz Festival and the Jazzfestival Münster. Despite having invitations for upcoming tours to Australia and the United States the group stopped too early when Haage left to join the pop group Rainbirds.

== Name ==
The group's name referred to the characters in Waiting for Godot by Samuel Beckett. The group's album title was taken from a phrase in James Joyce's Finnegans Wake. Both names were chosen by Harth who had favored Samuel Beckett as a writer from around 1968 on. Harth interpreted the two characters Wladimir and Estragon in Waiting for Godot as West Germany and East Germany during the Cold War who are waiting for unification. Surprisingly to everybody the Iron Curtain collapsed some months after the foundation of the music group Vladimir Estragon.

== Members ==
- FM Einheit – percussion works, drums, stones
- Alfred Harth - composition, tenor saxophone, alto saxophone, clarinet, bass clarinet
- Ulrike Haage – composition programming, piano, synth
- Phil Minton – vocals, trumpet

== Discography ==
Three Quarks For Muster Mark (LP+CD, Enja Records/Tip Toe, 1989)

== Sources ==
- Jürgen Schwab: Der Frankfurt-Sound. Eine Stadt und ihre Jazzgeschichte(n). Frankfurt/Main: Societäts-Verlag, 2005, with 2 CDs,ISBN 3-7973-0888-4
- Christoph Wagner: Brüche und Kontinuität.In “Neue Zeitschrift für Musik” 6/2007
- FM Einheit in the www : Webpräsenz von FM Einheit
- Massimo Ricci's review
