= Lark (band) =

South African band

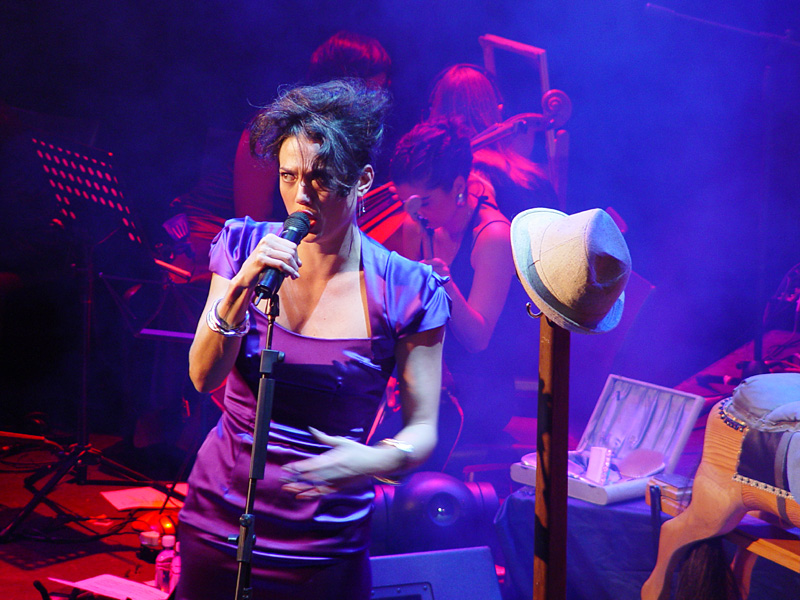

Background information
- Origin: Cape Town, South Africa
- Genres: Electronica; avant-garde; glitch
- Years active: 2003–2009, 2011–present
- Labels: Just Music; Onion Records; Next Music; Universal
- Members: Inge Beckmann; Paul Ressel; Simon "Fuzzy" Ratcliffe; Sean Ou Tim
- Website: Lark on Facebook

Lark (sometimes stylised as LARK) are a South African glitch electronica band from Cape Town. Formed in 2003, the group consists of Inge Beckmann (vocals), Paul Ressel (sequencers and analog systems), Simon "Fuzzy" Ratcliffe (bass guitar and woodwinds), and Sean Ou Tim (drums and percussion). They are often cited as "groundbreaking musicians", who were the key contributors to establishing experimental and intelligent dance music in South Africa. Their name has become synonymous with musical experimentalism, and are one of the country's best loved acts. Lark has released 3 studio albums, and won a SAMA for their debut album, Razbliuto!. Their music videos have been consistently met with admiration for their technically ability, and have received two MK Awards.

== History ==
=== Formation and Mouth of Me (2003–06) ===
"When we perform with just the two of us, it’s basically up to me to do all the instrumentation. So unfortunately some of the stuff does have to be backing tracks—basslines and such."

— Paul Ressel, on performing.

The band formed in Cape Town, during April 2003. At the time Inge Beckmann, a classically trained jazz and opera singer, was performing with the hip-hop group Spindle Sect. She desired to create a solo electronica project with a producer “that was a team player”. Paul Ressel, performing as the Humazier, felt he needed a female vocalist to further explore his musical style. One evening, Beckmann heard some Humanizer tracks, and "instantly" realised this was the producer she wanted. A mutual friend, Dominique Gawlowski, introduced her to Ressel and, a month later, the duo named themselves Lark. They later asked Gawlowski to manage their live shows.

The duo spent time writing, in Ressel's apartment, and performing at small venues. Beckmann described this song writing process as a form of “musical exorcism”. After eight months, they went into the Sound & Motion studio in Cape Town to record their South Africa-only extended play (EP), Mouth of Me. The studio was owned by Simon Ratcliffe, a session bassist, who he engineered the recording, but did not play during the session. Produced by Ressel, the EP titled was inspired by a phrase used by Beckmann's ex-boyfriend. The EP was launched on 1 March 2005 at SOBIET in Cape Town. Ratcliffe played electric bass at the launch, and in the small crowd at the launch was, future drummer, Sean Ou Tim.

"Tricksy"
"Tricksy" defines glitch opera, with sounds jutting into the mix at unexpected angles.

After the launch the duo toured extensively, and created a solid grassroots following in South Africa, England and Germany. Ressel described their music as a blend of "organic and mechanical" sounds, and coined the term "glitch opera". It failed to chart a single, yet critics cite the EP as changing electronica in South Africa. The song "Tricksy" became a firm favourite amongst their loyal fans. It was later used on the soundtrack for Lauren Beukes' acclaimed novel Zoo City. In 2006, the duo were involved with three MTV Staying Alive television campaign, about aids awareness. They became involved after emailing the CEO of MTV Europe print campaign design. The campaigns starred Beckmann and Ressel reading poetry over dream-like imagery, backed with a glitch soundtrack produced by Ressel. It became successful for its emotive words and eerie soundtrack. It was around this time, Ratcliffe joined the band full-time as their bassist.

=== Razbliuto! and mainstream success (2006–07) ===
In April 2006, the band released their first music video, "Moonlight", directed by Greg Rom and Anthony Dart. It tells the story of futuristic corporate espionage, betrayal, and revenge. The production was rumoured to have cost R1 million (equivalent to US$67,629), with 24 people involved. The video is praised for "technologically and narratively" breaking new ground for South African music videos. Even though abstract and unusual for the country, at the time, the video received high rotation on the popular South African music channel, MK. The music video is often cited as one of South Africa's best music videos of all time, and its popularity caused the band's EP to sell out four months later. This nationwide exposure catapulted Lark into the mainstream, and shortly after they were signed by Just Music.

"What is exciting about the local scene is that there is so much potential ... People are so hungry for something that is not straightforward middle-of-the-road."

— Inge Beckmann, on the local music scene.

The band's debut album, Razbliuto!, was released in September 2006 on Just Music. Produced by Ressel, at Sound & Motion, it received praise from critics. The album's maturity and lyrical playfulness created something that was experimentally ambitious, yet accessible as noted by critics. During the recording, the band was introduced to Ou Tim, a session musician and multi-instrumentalist. After recording the album, he joined the band as their on-stage drummer and percussionist. The album won the Best Alternative Album at the 13th South African Music Awards in 2007, beating established favourite Chris Chameleon. After the release, Lark focused on securing tour dates in Europe, as the album failed to attract airplay on national radio stations. As one critic noted, "this country may be a little too small for an album this grand".

By popular demand, the band re-released their EP as a second album, Mouth of Me, in June 2007. It included the original six tracks, re-worked with new vocals and live drums, three remixes, and new two tracks. The Cape Town album launch was recorded live at the BMW Pavilion in the Victoria & Alfred Waterfront. The concert included guest performances from Johnny de Ridder (guitarist of Fokofpolisiekar), Kyla Rose Smith (violist of Freshlyground), a four-piece string section, and VJ Grrrl on visuals. The stage was dressed by Beckmann, and represented a "twisted playroom". Their performance of the album's single, "Heroin Mary", was released as their second official music video. The lyrics chronicle a woman battling her most inner insecurities, that eventually taunt her in the final verse. It has been described as "an iron fist in a velvet glove".

=== My Coke Fest snub and sabbatical (2007–09) ===
"It's not like not getting one gig meant we decided to stop the band, but it was really the one thing that made it clear: after all that we've done, and this is where we get to. What's the point?"

— Paul Ressel, on the sabbatical.

Following the launch, Lark began an extensive tour with notable performances at Oppikoppi, and the Sakifo Festival in Réunion. The band announced their intention to start recording a follow-up, to their Mouth of Me release, in September. This was postponed with an announcement, on 21 February 2008, that Lark would be put on sabbatical after Ressel had been signed as a producer to London-based agency Z Management. Beckman explained she would use the time to concentrate on her acting career. The break-up was described as "complicated", with the band citing the lack of financial incentive and audience, and expressing that there was "no future for them in South Africa, musically".

It was later revealed the "final straw", as Paul Ressel described it, was the snub from the organisers of South Africa's largest stadium music festival, My Coke Fest. The event - sponsored by Coca-Cola - included local acts sharing the stage with international bands in Johannesburg and Cape Town. The 2008 tour was headlined by alternative acts, Muse, Kaiser Chiefs, and Korn. The festival was regarded as the stage for "international exposure", yet Lark was not billed or considered for one the ten local slots available. Shortly after, South Africa's premier rock festival, RAMFest announced Lark would have their final performance at the festival. The band stated they remain "best friends", quashing rumours of internal strife.

A year after their last performance, RAMFest announced that Lark would headline their 2009 festival. Many of the acts cited Lark as their most-anticipated performance to watch at the festival. Inge Beckmann later revealed that RAMFest had agreed to pay for Paul Ressel's flights from the UK, and that there would be a five show tour, named after their new single, "Brave". At the RAMFest performance the band released a live DVD, of their 2007 album launch in Cape Town, A Dagger and a Feather. The DVD was described as the band's "most extravagant" performance to date. Lark made brief appearances at RAMFest 2010, with the release of their V EP, and Rocking the Daises 2011 with the release of their remix Brave EP on the Italian-label Onion Records. The EP was a collection of remixes of "Brave", by Haezer and four other European DJs. A year later, their third music video was released for the remix of "Brave" by Haezer. The dystopian animation of a robot universe won Best Animated Video at the MK Awards in 2013.

=== Return as Lark (Electro), and Gong is Struck (2011–present) ===
"The Lark songwriting team has always consisted of Inge Beckmann and Paul Rez – there is no Lark without Paul. There is no Lark without Inge."

— Inge Beckmann, on songwriting.

In August 2011, Paul Ressel and Inge Beckmann performed as Oppikoppi as a duo under the name Lark (Electro). The duo showcased new material, as well as songs from their back-catalogue. Inge Beckmann described Lark (Electro) as a two-person performance, while Lark remains the original four-piece band. The performance was followed by an announcement that the entire band would be recording new material, in August. It was revealed that Inge Beckmann and Paul Ressel had been writing new material over Skype and e-mail over a year, since early 2010. Inge Beckmann had visited Paul Ressel twice in London, and explained the writing was "out of pure creative frustration and Lark lovelorn". In October 2011, Lark (Electro) performed at the Bestival in the Isle of Wright on the new band stage. Although on stage during an established act's main stage performance, Lark (Electro) received high-praise from sound engineers and fellow acts as "something new".

At the Assembly in Cape Town, in late-February 2012, Lark released their fourth music video. It was for their new single, Stole the Moon, and was directed by Dave Meinert. The music video was originally for another artist, with Beckmann as a character. Once Meinert heard some of their new demos, he re-scripted the video for Lark. The video depicts Beckmann walking through the 300 year-old tunnels of Cape Town, and concludes with an ariel shot 24 kilometres above the earth. The band released their third studio album, Gong is Struck, on Next Music in July 2012. The album is a departure from previous albums, with a more tribal and theatrical edge. Inspired by mythology, Inge Beckmann's lyrics are more structured and decisive, while the music strikes "vivd context". Lark went on a national tour, where they were voted, by the audience, as Best Live Act at Splashy Fen 2012.

"We are Growing"
"We are Growing" is a cover song that complements the album’s theme.

The album achieved moderate success amongst the fans, it received a lukewarm response from critics. A critic at the Mail & Guardian noted the band's "failure to stake a claim for continuing relevance in the South African music scene." The album's second single, a cover of "We Are Growing" originally by Margaret Singana, received high rotation on university radio stations and peaked at number two on UCT radio. Beckmann claims she wanted to create a "twisted version" of the pop song. After the tour, Beckmann joined the South African rock supergroup BEAST as lead vocalist. Ressel still resides in London, teaching at the Point Blank Music College, and has since worked with Lana Del Rey and Faithless. Lark continues to make brief appearances at music festivals, either as Lark or Lark (Electro).

== Musical style ==
=== Instrumentation ===
Their resulting sound is eclectic, drawing on the rock, Western classical, electronic, and world vernaculars - everything from electric guitar to harpsichord to snare rushes to Ratcliffe's duduk.

=== Influences ===
In the early days, the band cited Radiohead, Massive Attack, and Portishead, because of the combination of electronic sequencers with live instrumentation, sample manipulation, and female lead vocals. Lark is often compared to Diamanda Galas, Beth Orton, Portishead, Pram, and Bjork. Recently, the band prefers not compare themselves. As Inge Beckmann has expressed that she does not have a single artist in mind, when creating a Lark track. Although she has spoken about being by inspired by Ella Fitzgerald, Freddie Mercury, Diana Ross, David Bowie, and Stevie Wonder. Paul Ressel has mentioned influences like The Books, Aphex Twin, Square Pusher, and, being heavily inspired by, Amon Tobin.

== Legacy ==
Lark's efforts are recognised for introducing alternative genres to mainstream South African audiences. Their sound paved the way for numerous electronic artists like Sibot, Spoek Mathambo, Tshe-Tsha Boys, Motel Mari, DJ Mujava, Dirty Paraffin and Die Antwoord; who all garnered local support during their sabbatical. In an interview, Beckmann described the growth on the local scene as "very positive".

== Members ==
- Inge Beckmann — vocals (2003–present)
- Paul Ressel — sequencers, analog systems and laptop (2003–present)
- Simon "Fuzzy" Ratcliffe — upright bass, electric bass and woodwinds (2005–present)
- Sean Ou Tim — drums and percussion (2006–present)

== Discography ==
=== Studio albums ===
- Razbliuto! (2006)
- Mouth of Me (2007)
- Gong Is Struck (2012)

=== Extended plays ===
- Mouth of Me (2005)
- V (2010)
- Brave (2011)

=== Videography ===
- "Moonlight" on YouTube (2006)
- "Herion Mary" on YouTube (2007)
- A Dagger and a Feather (2008)
- "Brave" on YouTube (2012)
- "Stole The Moon" on YouTube (2012)
