= Razbliuto =

Razbliuto!

Studio album by Lark
- Released: August 2006
- Recorded: May – June 2006
- Studio: Sound & Motion Studios, Cape Town
- Genre: Glitch; electronica; experimental
- Length: 41:59
- Label: Just Music
- Producer: Paul Ressel

Lark chronology
Mouth Of Me (EP) (2005)	Razbliuto! (2006)	Mouth of Me (2007)

Razbliuto! is the debut album of South African glitch-electronica band Lark. It was produced by Paul Ressel, and released in August 2006 on Just Music. The album art was designed by Nigel Moore, with sleeve photography by Natasja Fourie.

== Reception ==
The album received much praise from critics, and won Best Alternative Album at the 13th South African Music Awards in 2007. The music critic, Marcus Louw, remarked that the album's strength "lies in the way in which Lark manage to be quite adventurous and experimental while still remaining accessible". In the Cape Argus, Evan Milton described the album as "densely layered and delectably dark" The American podcast, Nonstuff, proclaimed that "Lark’s presence in Cape Town is certain to make us take notice".

== Track listing ==
All tracks are written by Lark.

No.	Title	Music	Additional	Length
1.	"Razbliuto"	Paula Masterson		0:47
2.	"..."			0:33
3.	"Russian Dolls"		David Shapiro (mandola), Andre Jansen van Rensberg (accordion)	3:48
4.	"Spider's Eye"		Lara Block (cello)	3:27
5.	"Bionic Mind"		Micky Wiswedel (synth)	3:29
6.	"Mouth of Me"			2:07
7.	"Yuralastine De Biao"			3:54
8.	"Half Eaten"			4:43
9.	"It's Not It"			2:56
10.	"Cradle Of Cable"		Paula Masterson (clarinet)	3:27
11.	"Clown Mayonnaise"			3:46
12.	"Thoughts"		Kyla-Rose Smith (violin), Rayelle Goodman (violin), Paula Masterson (clarinet)	4:18
13.	"Reflections"			4:43
Total length:				41:59

== Personnel ==
Band members

- Inge Beckmann - vocals, vocal FX
- Paul Ressel - sequencing, synth, piano, guitar and harpsichord
- Simon Ratcliffe - electric bass, double bass and duduk
- Sean Ou Tim - drums, percussion

Session musicians

- Paula Masterson - clarinet, string arrangements
- David Shapiro - mandola
- Micky Wiswedel - synth
- Lara Block - cello
- Andre Jansen van Rensberg - accordion
- Kyla-Rose Smith - violin
- Rayelle Goodman - violin

== Album name ==
The album's name is a reference to a long-running hoax of a Russian word, that purportedly cannot be translated into the English language. In reality this word does not exist in the Russian language.
