= 1982–1992 (Cassiber album) =

- Box sleeve

Box set by Cassiber
- Released: 2013
- Recorded: 1982–1992
- Language: German and English
- Label: Recommended Records
- Producer: re-mastered by Bob Drake

1982–1992 (also known as The Cassiber Box) is a 2013 box set compilation album on Recommended Records commemorating the German new wave group Cassiber founded by Heiner Goebbels, Alfred Harth, Christoph Anders and Chris Cutler.

The period "1982–1992" is the defining period of activity for the band. The box comprises the 4 original Cassiber albums on three discs, remastered by the American recording engineer Bob Drake, 2 further remastered discs with the band's Cassix, Duck and Cover and Ground Zero projects, a sixth disc of unreleased studio and live material. The box also includes a 2-hour long DVD of live and studio footage, including a documentary made during the recording of the album A Face We All Know (1990), and a book.
