= 1982–1992 =

1982–1992 may refer to:

- 1982–1992 (Europe album), a music compilation album
- 1982–1992 (Cassiber album), a music compilation album
