= Mouth of Me =

Studio album by Lark
- Released: 2007
- Genre: Electronica; experimental
- Label: Just Music, UMG

Lark chronology
Razbliuto! (2006)	Mouth of Me (2007)	V (2010)

Singles from Mouth of Me
- 1. "Moonlight"

Professional ratings
Review scores
Source	Rating
eMusic	4.0/5 stars
News24	4.0/5 stars

Mouth of Me is the second studio album by South African electronica band Lark. It is a reworking of their first EP of the same name, with remixes and two new tracks.

== Track listing ==
All tracks are written by Lark (Simon Ratcliffe, Sean Ou Tim, Paul Ressel and Inge Beckmann)

No.	Title	Length
1.	"Black Swan"	3:41
2.	"Heroin Mary"	3:05
3.	"Moonlight"	4:51
4.	"Grey Evenings" (Mr Sakitumi Larkonepsi Remix)	3:56
5.	"Pearly Silver"	3:15
6.	"Weights"	2:56
7.	"Around Swings"	3:28
8.	"Half Eaten" (Jacob Israel Vancomycin Remix)	4:47
9.	"Creature"	4:20
10.	"Tricksy"	3:05
11.	"Grey Evenings"	4:12
12.	"Moonlight" (Fuzzy Mondo Surround Mix)	2:54
Total length:		44:30
