= Ulrike Haage =

German musician

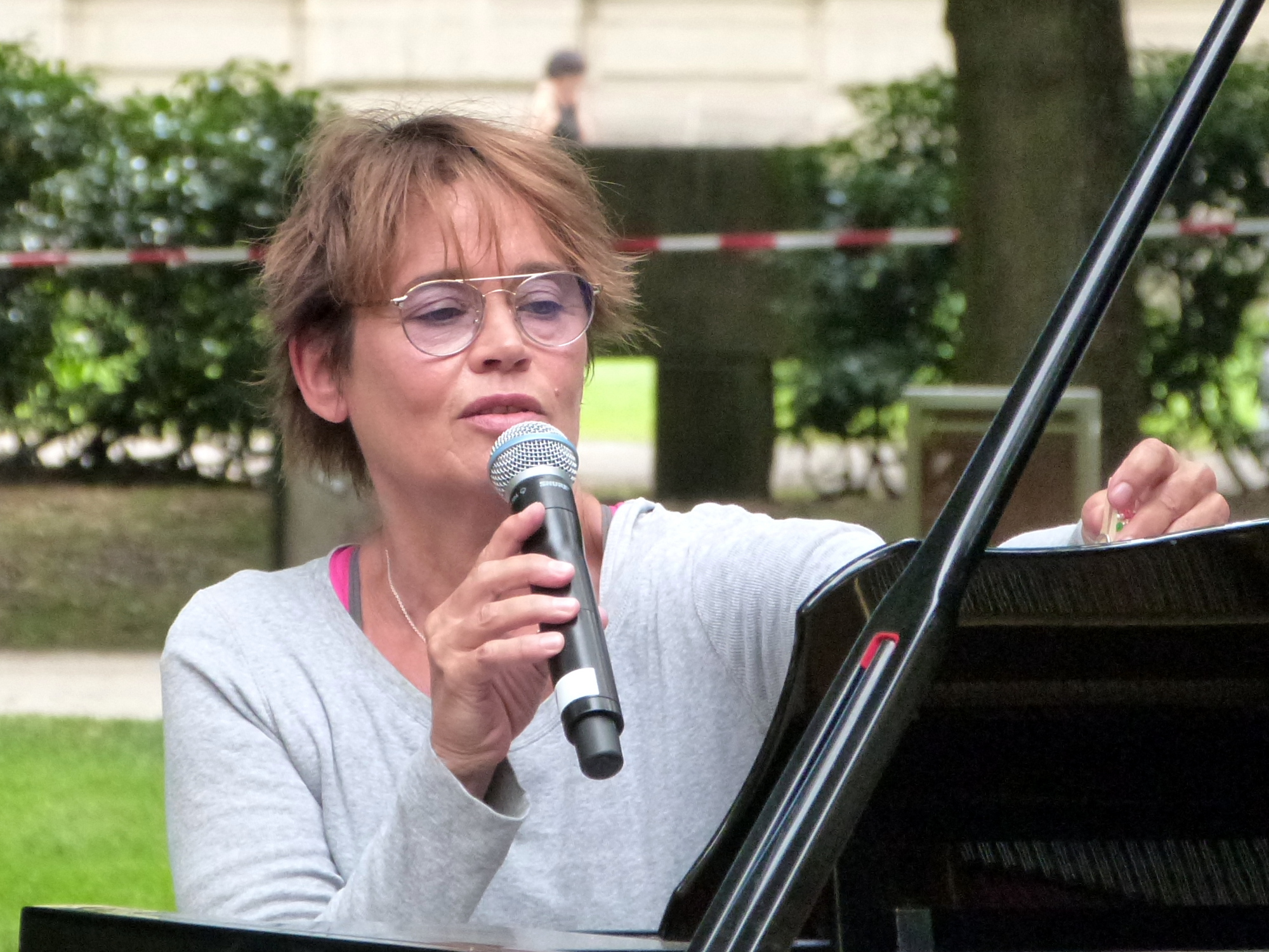
- Haage performing in Erlangen in 2016

Background information
- Born: 1957 (age 68–69)
- Origin: Kassel, Germany
- Years active: 1980s–present
- Website: www.ulrikehaage.com

Ulrike Haage (born 1957) is a German pianist and composer, producer for radio plays and a sound artist.

== Biography ==
=== The jazz years ===
Haage spent her childhood in Ruhr. She grew up listening to the jazz record collection of her parents and trained to play piano listening to masters as Bill Evans and Thelonious Monk, improvising. As a teenager she started singing and playing guitar in a garage-band.

After studying music and music therapy at Musikhochschule Hamburg, she stayed on and taught improvisation and orchestra direction from 1985 to 1989. During this time she began to compose and started playing piano for the first German Female Jazz band: Reichlich Weiblich. While working with Peter Zadek on the theatre play Andi, she met FM Einheit. With him, Alfred 23 Harth and Phil Minton, the group Vladimir Estragon was founded, where Haage began to introduce electronic music. A year later, because of the departure of Alfred Harth, the quartet became the trio GOTO, with the vocal acrobatics of Phil Minton.

=== Pop and theatre years ===
In 1990, Haage joined Katharina Franck in the pop group Rainbirds, which is already facing recognition (their first album Rainbirds attained gold record). They release Two faces and In A Different Light .

Between tours and recordings for the Rainbirds and the theatre music group Stein (Katharina Franck, FM Einheit) she worked at theaters in Zurich (Uwe Eric Laufenberg), Düsseldorf (Kazuko Watanabe.) and Berlin (e.g. The Ballade of Narayama with Kazuko Watanabe) In 1999 a collaboration with the actress Meret Becker begins. In addition she becomes the music director of the concert’s program Nachtmahr and records the CD Fragiles. With the translator and publisher Sylvia de Hollanda (Pociao's Books), she founds Sans Soleil, a publishing house for books and radio plays.

=== German jazz award: Alfred Mangelsdorff Preis ===
In 2003 Haage became the first and up to then the youngest woman to win the German Jazz Award. Markus Müller, presenting the award, paid tribute "to her outstanding and versatile life-work that reinvents itself ». He emphasized her artistic way through pop, art and avant-garde.

=== The solo period, not so solo ===
Sélavy, her first instrumental solo album was released in 2004. In the next two years, the Goethe Institut of Moscow invited her to tour the cities along the Wolga and Siberia, playing concerts and giving workshops.

In 2006, she recorded her second solo album Weißes Land.

Since then, she participated among other projects in the Ring with choreographer Felix Ruckert and musician Christian Meyer, where she played simultaneously to the choreography happening in front of her in interaction with the dancers.

In 2007 Haage she became an artist-in-residence at the Hartung-Bergman foundation, composing a "dialogue", a music piece for chamber vibraphone, marimbaphone and electronics (Nunatak), in correspondence to the paintings of Anna-Eva Bergman and produced more and more radio plays for the German public radio. For example, Alles aber Anders (2009), a radio play for the Bavarian Radio, Bayerischer Rundfunk, after the diary of the sculptor Eva Hesse. For the celebration of the 90th Anniversary of the Bauhaus, she performed her radio play Der Kreis ist rot, after the diary of Oskar Schlemmer.

The opera radio play Amnesie der Ozeane in collaboration with Stephan Krass, was produced in 2010, as is the music for the sound-book Heimsuchung (novel by Jenny Erpenbeck). Between concerts and conferences her third solo album In:finitum was in the making and released in 2011.

In 2012 Haage spent three months at the artist-residence Villa Kamagowa in Kyoto, Japan. Here the idea for the composition of For all my walking took root. Another artist-in-residence program, this time at the Leuphana Universität Lüneburg, was where she produces an audio-visual piece between sound and silence, which deals with the subject of public space as a sound space.

2015 saw the release (September 4) of her fourth solo album Maelstrom. The same year the production of two radio plays Lockbuch and Geld were finished and the composition of the soundtrack to the new Doris Dörrie film Grüße aus Fukushima, which was running at the 66th Berlinale International Film Festival, was recorded. Also showing at the 2016 Berlinale was the film Landstück by German filmmaker Volker Koepp featuring music by Haage.

== Style and influences ==
Haage's music is influenced by various styles, including jazz. This influence is clear in some of her compositions, which leave a big part to improvisation; her partitions may only contain an indication of chord on which she will improvise during the concert. Haage's thorough classic training of music shows in her instrumental acuity, and the repetitions of more or less long terms, according to the tradition of the ostinato.

Haage also uses language as a part of her works. A lot of these play-on-words have an artist´s words for inspiration. Alles aber Anders, from Eva Hesse's journal, is a particularly interesting example; she repeats certain words according to a particular rhythm, replaced by a sound, until exhaustion. Just like these visual artists (Eva Hesse, Louise Bourgeois), whose words she puts into music, we can hear breaks, "flat areas", as if she were drawing musical landscapes with big streaks of colors.

Haage herself is an influence to new artists such as Nepomuk, who remixed "Magic Waters".

== Discography ==
- Grüße aus Fukushima (2016), BPM, soundtrack
- Maelstrom (solo album, 2015), BPM
- Erzählung des Gleichgewichts 4:W (2015) Blue Pearls (Indigo)
- Das verschwundene M (2014) soundtrack
- For all my walking (2014), Sans Soleil
- Meret Oppenheim: Eine Surrealistin auf eigenen Wegen (2013) DVD
- Flügel und Katze. Musik für Kinder (2012)
- Ema. Akte auf der Treppe (2011) soundtrack
- Ana:mnesis (2011), BPM
- In:finitum (solo album, 2011), BPM
- Goldrausch (2011), BPM, soundtrack
- Zwiebelfische (2010) DVD, soundtrack
- Edition Filmmusik - Komponiert in Deutschland #13: Ulrike Haage (2010), NORMAL Records
- Le Pianoscope (2007) Edition UBM/Universal Publishing Production Music GmbH
- Weißes Land (solo album, 2006), content records
- Sélavy (solo album, 2004) content records

Reichlich Weiblich - Live in Moers (1987)

Vladimir Estragon (mit Alfred Harth, FM Einheit, Phil Minton) - Three Quarks for Muster Mark (1989)

Rainbirds - 3000.live (1999), Forever (1997), Making Memory (1996), The Mercury Years (1995), In a Different Light (1993), Two Faces (1991)

Gruppe Stein (Katharina Franck und FM Einheit) - König Zucker (1994), Steinzeit (1992)

Goto - Goto, Phil Minton, FM Einheit, Haage (1995)

== Filmography ==
- Landstück (Vineta Film & RBB, D 2016) directed by Volker Koepp, music by Ulrike Haage
- Grüße aus Fukushima (OLGA FILM, D 2016) directed by Doris Dörrie, music by Ulrike Haage
- Snapshot Mon Amour. Haiku-short film (thede filmproduktion, D 2015) a film by Christian Bau, music by Ulrike Haage
- Das verschwundene M (thede filmproduktion, D 2014) directed by Maria Hemmleb, music by Ulrike Haage
- Meret Oppenheim: Eine Surrealistin auf eigenen Wegen (Kobalt Productions, D 2013) directed by Daniela Schmidt-Langels, music by Ulrike Haage
- Ema. Akt auf Treppe (zero one film, SWR & ARTE, D 2012) directed by Corinna Belz, music byUlrike Haage
- Goldrausch (zero one film, SWR, NDR & MDR, D 2012) produced by Thomas Kufus, music by Ulrike Haage
- Zwiebelfische (thede filmproduktion, D 2010) a film by Christian Bau & Artur Dickhoff, music by Ulrike Haage

== Radio Plays ==
- Geld (DKultur, 2015) text: Gertrude Stein, direction and composition: Ulrike Haage
- Lockbuch (NDR2, 2015) text: Nora Gomringer und Annemarie Bostroem, direction and composition: Ulrike Haage
- The Moon Tapes (SWR, 2014), Stephan Krass, Ulrike Haage, composition for the SWR vocal ensemble und 3 narrators
- Der Kreis ist rot (WDR3, 2014) feature about the Bauhausmeister Oskar Schlemmer
- Die magische Pfeilspitze (WDR5, KiRaKa, 2013) for children
- Orlando (BR, 2013), Random House
- Alle Vögel fliegen hoch (BR2,^{[6]} 2012) after the stories by the painter Leonora Carrington
- Erzählung des Gleichgewichts 4:W (DKultur, 2012) text: Jean Daive, composition: Ulrike Haage
- Nichts. Was im Leben wichtig ist (SWR2, 2011) Janne Teller, Ulrike Haage
- Wenn ich vier Dromedare hätte (WDR3, 2011) feature about the film essayist Chris Marker
- Heimsuchung (BR2, 2009) novel by Jenny Erpenbeck
- Amnesie der Ozeane (SWR2, 2009)
- Alles aber anders (BR, 2009), from the diaries by Eva Hesse, Sans Soleil
- Der Wind in der Weiden (WDR, 2008), after the text by Kenneth Grahame
- Die Stille hinter den Worten (BR, 2008)
- Pikdame. Pamphletes and letters by Nancy Cunard (BR, 2006)
- Exakte Vision (BR, 2004), Ulrike Vosswinkel, Ulrike Haage, Sans Soleil
- Ding fest machen (BR, 2003), after the writings by Louise Bourgeois, Sans Soleil
- Bombsong (HR, 2002), Thea Dorn, Ulrike Haage (commission for Frankfurter Positionen), Sans Soleil
- Reise, Toter (BR, 2001) Durs Grünbein, Ulrike Haage, Sans Soleil
- Last Words : Qui Vivre Verra (BR, 2001), W. S. Burroughs, Ulrike Haage, Barbara Schäfer, Sans Soleil
- Die Wüste Lop Nor (BR, 2000), Raoul Schrott, Musik von Ulrike Haage, HÖR Verlag, 2000
- Bei unserer Lebensweise ist es sehr angenehm, lange im voraus zu einer Party eingeladen zu werden (BR, 1999), Jane Bowles, Katharina Franck, Ulrike Haage), Sans Soleil
- Odysseus 7 (BR, 1998), Ammer, Einheit, Haage; FM 4.5.1
- 7 Dances Of The Holy Ghost (BR, 1998), Ammer, Haage, Sans Soleil
- Apokalypse live (BR, 1994), Ammer, Einheit, Haage, Hörspielpreis der Kriegsblinden, Special Prize for Fiction des Prix Italia 1995, Verlag: FM 4.5.1

Other projects

- Schlachtplatte, 1998 with the Stein group, German operette from the Ring, produced by the Marstall Theater München.
- Imaginary Landscapes, podcasts cklab.

=== Collaborations ===
- Fragiles (2001), Meret Becker, Buddy Sacher, Ulrike Haage
- Music for the bonus of the DVD Requiem by Hans-Christian Schmid, 2007

== Sources ==
This article is based on translation of article on the German Wikipedia and the French one Ulrike Haage, as from her internet site myspace.

The biography extracted from Creative Europe was consulted also this one hardscore.de.
