= Sogenanntes Linksradikales Blasorchester =

Former wind band, based in Frankfurt

- Wind band
- Founded: 1976
- Disbanded: 1981
- Location: Frankfurt, Hesse, Germany

The Sogenanntes Linksradikales Blasorchester (So-called Radical Left Wind Band) was a wind band founded in 1976 in Frankfurt, Hesse, Germany, with a political program. It performed at protest demonstrations, Rock gegen Rechts, and the Russell Tribunal, among others. The professionals Heiner Goebbels, Alfred Harth, and Rolf Riehm were founders and regular players of the band, which made two recordings that were re-released in 1999. The group disbanded in 1981.

== History ==
The Sogenanntes Linksradikales Blasorchester was a wind band founded in 1976 in Frankfurt. Two players, Heiner Goebbels and Alfred Harth, were the core of the formation of about 20 members. Both were also soloists, and, in addition, they collaborated as the Duo Goebbels/Harth. Other players included Rolf Riehm and Thomas Jahn. Among the members there were only a few professionals. They recorded with the actor Ernst Stötzner and the publicist Cora Stephan, who learned to play the flute to be able to participate in the orchestra. The band was close to student protests for political and social improvements, with topics such as civil disobedience, protest against nuclear power and offenses against human rights. They played at events of the Frankfurt Sponti scene, trying to add music with a political message. They were inspired by Hanns Eisler's music, with a communicative dimension ("kommunikative Dimension"). Their repertory included his songs, including his "Solidaritätslied" on a text by Brecht, compositions by Goebbels, Harth and Riehm, arrangements of works by Frank Zappa and Nino Rota, new instrumentation of classical pieces such as a Bach prelude from the Das Wohltemperierte Klavier, and arrangements of folk music from Chile. Texts were related to political events, setting political literature by Erich Fried and Peter-Paul Zahl to music.

They performed at demonstrations against the Brokdorf Nuclear Power Plant and the Gorleben Nuclear Waste Repository, at Rock gegen Rechts, concerts against far-right politics, and the Russell Tribunal. Their activities have been described as applied politics by means of music ("angewandte Politik mit den Mitteln der Musik"). The band also played at the 1980 JazzFest Berlin at the Berliner Philharmonie. They disbanded in 1981.

== Members ==
Band members featured on recordings were:

Thomas Jahn, Gudrun Stocker, Cora Stephan	flute
Volker Haas, Reinhard Bussmann, Herwig Heise, Walter Ybema	clarinet
Klaus Becker, Johannes Eisenberg, Gunther Lohr	trumpet
Barbara Müller-Rendtorff, Rolf Riehm, Henning Wiese	alto saxophone
Christoph Anders, Heiner Goebbels, Alfred Harth	tenor saxophone
Michael Hoehler, Peter Lieser	trombone
Uwe Schriefer, Jörn Stückrath	tuba
Ernst Stötzner	vocal

== Recordings ==
- Hört, Hört (1977, LP, Trikont, released again as La Cosiddetta Banda (1980, LP, L'Orchestra)
- Mit gelben Birnen (1980, LP, Trikont)

A review of the 1980 LP noted that the cover shows protests in Gorleben. The music is described as a varied and surprising selection ("vielfältig und überraschend"), and in manifold styles and instrumentations. The LPs were combined in the compilation 1976–1981, released on CD in 1999.
