= Carl Stone (composer) =

American composer

- Born: Carl Joseph Stone; February 10, 1953 (age 73); Los Angeles, California, US
- Genres: Electroacoustic; sound collage; minimalism

Carl Stone (born Carl Joseph Stone, February 10, 1953) is an American composer, primarily working in the field of live electronic music. His works have been performed in the United States, Canada, Europe, Asia, Australia, South America, and the Near East.

== Biography ==
From 1966 to 1969 he formed a band with Z'EV and James Stewart, performing jazz rock. After auditioning for Frank Zappa's Bizarre Records, the band ceased activities. Stone studied composition at the California Institute of the Arts with Morton Subotnick and James Tenney, and has composed electroacoustic music almost exclusively since 1972.

Stone utilizes a laptop computer as his primary instrument. His works often feature very slowly developing manipulations of samples of acoustic music, speech, or other sounds. Previously, he created a number of electronic and collage works utilizing various electronic equipment as well as turntables. Prominent works from this period include Dong Il Jang (1982) and Shibucho (1984), both of which subjected a wide variety of appropriated musical materials to fragmentation and looping. In this period, he began naming many of his works after his favorite restaurants.

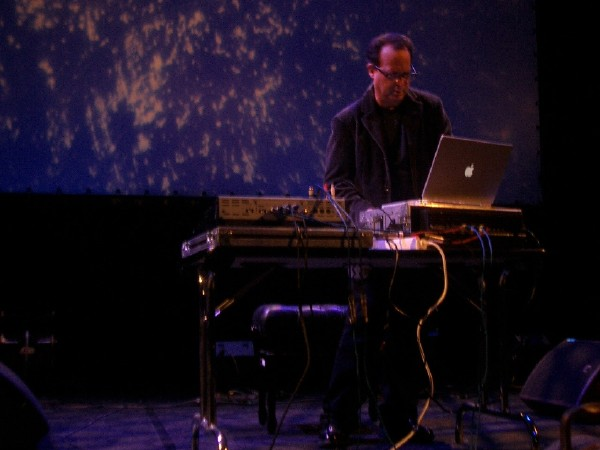
Carl Stone performing at Cité de la Musique, Paris, November 1, 2003

His first residency in Japan, sponsored by the Asian Cultural Council, was from November 1988 to April 1989. While living in Tokyo, he collected more than 50 hours of recordings of the city's urban soundscape, which he later used as the basis for his radio composition Kamiya Bar, sponsored by Tokyo FM radio, and released on a CD of the same name by the Italian label NewTone/Robi Droli.

Stone has collaborated frequently with Asian performers, including traditional instrumentalists such as Min Xiao-Fen (pipa), Yumiko Tanaka (shamisen), Kazue Sawai (koto), Michiko Akao (ryuteki), and those working with modern instruments, such as Otomo Yoshihide (turntables, guitar), Kazuhisa Uchihashi (guitar, daxophone), Yuji Takahashi (computer, piano), and vocalists such as Reisu Saki and Haco. He has also collaborated on an album with Hirohito Ihara's Radicalfashion with Alfred Harth and Miki Yui.

Beginning in the early years of the 21st century, Stone began to compose more frequently for acoustic instruments and ensembles, completing a new work for the San Francisco Bay Area-based American Baroque.

Stone served as president of the American Music Center from 1992 to 1995, and was director of Meet the Composer/California from 1981 to 1997. He also served as music director of KPFK-FM in Los Angeles from 1978 to 1981.

For many years, Stone has divided his time between California and Japan.

Stone received a 1999 Foundation for Contemporary Arts Grants to Artists Award.

== Works ==
=== Solo recordings ===
- Wat Dong Moon Lek (May 2022)
- Namidabashi (2021) - digital only release, part of the Displacing series, on Touch
- Stolen Car (2020)
- Himalaya (2017)
- Al Noor (2007) – Explorations into the dismantling and re-composition of global song and melody
- Nak Won (2002) – Real-time music for laptop computer
- Resonator (2002) – Soundtrack for the works of sculptor Seiji Kunishima
- Exusiai (1998, released 1999) – Music for contemporary dancer Akira Kasai
- em:t 1196 (1996) – The musical part of a three-way collaboration between the composer, dancer Kuniko Kisanuki and sculptor Satoru Shoji
- Kamiya Bar (1995) – Excerpts from a sound collage assembled in 1992 from TV commercials and field recordings made in Tokyo in the late 1980s
- Mom's (1992)
- Four Pieces (1989) – Playful explorations and transformations for Macintosh computer
- Wave-Heat (1983) – Piece for digital delay/harmonizer and an LP record; released on audio cassette
- Woo Lae Oak (1981, released 1983; re-issued 2008 as a single continuous track) – A concrete symphony for the tremolo of a rubbed string and the tone of a blown bottle

=== Some unreleased recordings ===
- Torung (1983) – Piece for Synclavier
- Maneeya (1973) – Piece for tape
- Plastics (1972) – Film soundtrack

=== Other released collaborations ===
Realistic Monk, (2015–present) collaboration with sound artist Miki Yui

Pict.soul (2000–2001) – Long-distance collaboration with Tetsu Inoue
Monogatari: Amino Argot (1994) – Long-distance collaboration with Otomo Yoshihide
Over-Ring-Under (1992) – Soundtrack to a videogame CD-ROM, with visual artist Teckon

=== Other commissioned works ===
- Luong Hai Ky Mi Gia (2001) – DVD-Audio/Video piece for 5.1 surround sound system; commissioned by Starkland
- Sa Rit Gol (1997) – Piece for disklavier and pianist; commissioned by Bay Area Pianists and Cal Performances, as part of the Henry Cowell Centennial Celebration at UC Berkeley
- The Noh Project (1996) – A collaboration with choreographer June Watanabe and Noh master Anshin Uchida
- Yam Vun Sen (1995) – Network duel piece for the internet; commissioned by NTT as part of IC95 Festival, Tokyo
- Sudi Mampir (1995) – Contribution to compilation album "em:t 5595"
- Banh Mi So (1994) – Piece for ondes martenot and piano; commissioned by Takashi Harada and Aki Takahashi
- Mae Ploy (1994) – Piece for String Quartet and computer accompanist; commissioned by the Strings Plus Festival, Kobe, for the Smith Quartet
- Lumpinee (1993) – Installation for computer-operated MIDI system; commissioned by the Museum of Contemporary Art, Los Angeles for the exhibition "John Cage: Rolywholyover: A Circus"
- Du Pars (1993) – Soundtrack for interactive laserdisk "L.A. Journal", produced by Voyager
- Ruen Pair (1993) – Piece for electronic chamber ensemble; commissioned by the Paul Dresher Ensemble
- Rezukuja (1991) – Piece for bass marimba and electronics; commissioned by Sumire Yoshihara
- She Gol Jib (1991) – Piece for ryuteki (flute) and electronics; commissioned by Michiko Akao
- Recurring Cosmos (1991) – Piece for High Definition video and electronics, including Banteay Srey; commissioned by Sony PCL
- Made in Hollywood (1990) – Soundtrack music; commissioned by ZDF Television, Germany
- Thonburi (1989) – Part of the radio series "Territory of Art"
- Spalding Gray's Map of L.A. (1987) – Soundtrack for videotape produced and directed by Bruce and Norman Yonemoto
- Vault (1984) – Soundtrack for videotape produced and directed by Bruce and Norman Yonemoto
- Mae Yao (1984) – Piece for live electronics, multiple bagpipes and pipe organ; commissioned by The Art of Spectacle Festival
- Se Jong (1983) – Piece for tape; commissioned by the 1984 Olympic Arts Festival as part of the radio series "Sounds In Motion"

== Reviews ==
- The Wire Top Ten 2020, Stolen Car
- Artforum, Best of 2019, Himalaya
- Bandcamp, Best Experimental Albums of 2019, Himalaya and Baroo
- Pitchfork, Best Experimental Albums of 2019, Baroo
- The Wire Best of 2019, Himalaya
- The Wire Best of 2019, Baroo
- The Wire full review Himalaya

== Listening ==
- surround sound recording of Luong Hai Ky Mi Gia, commissioned by Starkland
- Excerpt from 2002 sound. at the Schindler House performance on YouTube at SASSAS
