= Beast (South African band) =

South African garage rock band

BEAST
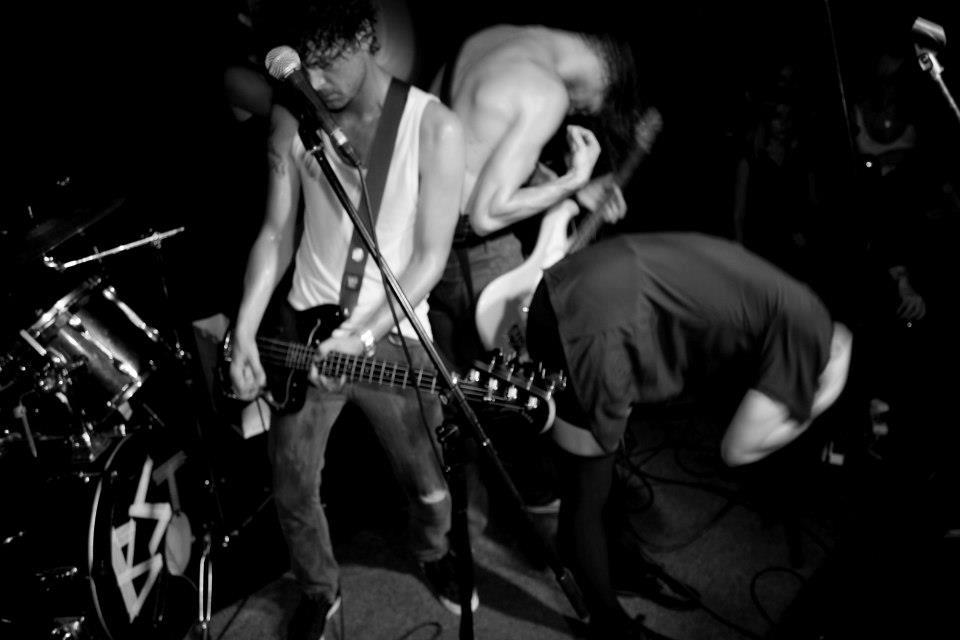

Background information
- Origin: Cape Town, South Africa
- Genres: Garage rock; alternative rock; hard rock
- Years active: 2012–present
- Label: Sheer Music
- Members: Inge Beckmann; Rian Zietsman; Louis Nel; Werner von Waltsleben
- Past members: Sasha Righini
- Website: BEAST on Facebook

Beast (often stylised as BEAST) is a garage rock supergroup from Cape Town. Formed in 2012, the band consists of Inge Beckmann (vocals) of Lark, Louis Nel (bass guitar) and Rian Zietsman (bass guitar) of Taxi Violence, and Werner von Waltsleben (drums) of Kobus!. BEAST's sound has been self-described as "psychological rock and roll" and a "four-nippled aberration".

They have become known for their energetic live performances. Their self-released debut album, Smoke Swig Swear, was met with local critical acclaim.

== History ==
=== Formation and Smoke Swig Swear (2011-13) ===
In late 2011, with a mutual desire to learn bass, Rian Zietsman and Louis Nel (guitarist and drummer of Taxi Violence, respectively) purchased two bass guitars and began practising in the basement of a house they shared. Rian described these early sessions as experiment, because "no one had tried [the two-bass set-up] before". Early into the experiment, the duo approached Sasha Righini (drummer of The Plastics) to join them and, later, he became a full member of the group. Soon afterwards, they booked their first performance under the band name "Kombass". This early name is a word play on the Afrikaans word "kombuis", which translates to kitchen.

"I think we're definitely filling a hole in the market. We're sick of fucking indie and electro and soft cock rock. We're making music that we want to listen to and that we want to watch live."

— Inge Beckmann, on joining BEAST

After recording their first session at Kill City Blues Studios, Rian and Louis set out to find a female vocalist. Inge Beckmann (vocalist of Lark) was in touch with Rian and Louis during the experimentation phase, but only wanted to invite her when "the sound was right". It was after announcing Lark's "semi-permanent" hiatus, Inge joined the band for their first live performance. She originally wanted to change the band name to "Bow Beast", as she enjoyed the " interesting visual effect in [her] mind". The band eventually settled on the name BEAST.

"Fill The Hole"
"Fill The Hole" is the "most abrasive track" on their debut album, featuring their twin-bass setup.

BEAST recorded its debut album, Smoke Swig Swear, over four days in September 2012 at Sound and Motion Studios in Cape Town. It was self-released as a free download to widespread local critical acclaim. The album had its official launch at The Assembly in Cape Town on 23 February 2013. Two weeks after the launch, the band released a short experimental documentary on Vimeo. It chronicles their rehearsals, recording session and live performances to create an "authentic look at the personalities behind the music". Before and after the success of their album launch, the band toured South Africa extensively. Their notable performance on the main stage at Oppikoppi, Up The Creek, Rocking The Daises, and Splashy Fen.

=== Line-up change, crowdfunding, and Bardo (2013-present) ===
In mid-2013, Sasha left the band to pursue his own music. The band invited Werner von Waltsleben (drummer of Kobus!) to join the band. In an interview, he spoke about his fantism for both Taxi Violence and Lark, explaining it "was like a dream come true" to play "the music [he] wanted too".

"In the end, the crowdfunding thing was very telling. I’m not sure if the general SA music fan is ready for it yet. But we most certainly learned exactly who our biggest and most loyal fans are."

— Louis Nel, on crowdfunding

On 13 August 2014, the band announced on their Facebook fan page, the start of their crowdfunding on Indiegogo to raise money for their second album. The band had not signed to any major label, as their original bands had done. On their Indiegogo page, the band wrote about the importance of artistic and creative freedom, but noted that "the kind of quality album [they] want is going to be difficult" without a major label monetary support. The campaign was unsuccessful, they raised US$1,739 of their US$8,000 goal.

"Black Hole"
"Black Hole" features a bass exchange reminiscent of RAGE with Inge using her "method singing".

After falling short of their goal, the band was approached by a private investor who "helped tremendously". The band recorded their album in October 2014 at Heritage Sound in Cape Town, with producer Brendyn Rossouw. The second album, Bardo, was launched at The Assembly in Cape Town on 27 February 2015. The album's theme focuses on the Tibetan Buddhism state of Bardo, between life and death. Inge was inspired by reading Charlie Morley's book Dreams of Awakening. The album received critical acclaim for its "professionalism", with one critic describing it as "[transcending] the point of being a mere piece of music".

== Musical style ==
=== Instrumentation ===
The twin-bass setup is fairly unusual to the South African music scene. Zietsman plays in lower key as the rhythm, akin to a normal bassist. Nel employs a higher chord-based approach as the lead, akin to a lead guitar. They perform with a bass and normal guitar amp to create a rawer, harder, and more low-fi sound.

== Members ==
Principal members

- Inge Beckmann – vocals (2012–present)
- Rian Zietsman – bass guitar (2011–present)
- Louis Nel – bass guitar (2011–present)
- Werner von Waltsleben – drums (2013–present)

Past members

- Sasha Righini – drums (2011–2013)

== Discography ==
Studio albums

- Smoke Swig Swear (2012)
- Bardo (Beast album)|Bardo (2015)

Videography

- "Fill The Hole" on Vimeo (2012)
- "BEAST Documentary" on Vimeo (2013)
- "Smoke Swig Swear" on Vimeo (2013)
- "Wrong Side" on YouTube (2014)
