= Heiner Goebbels =

German composer and theatre director (born 1952)

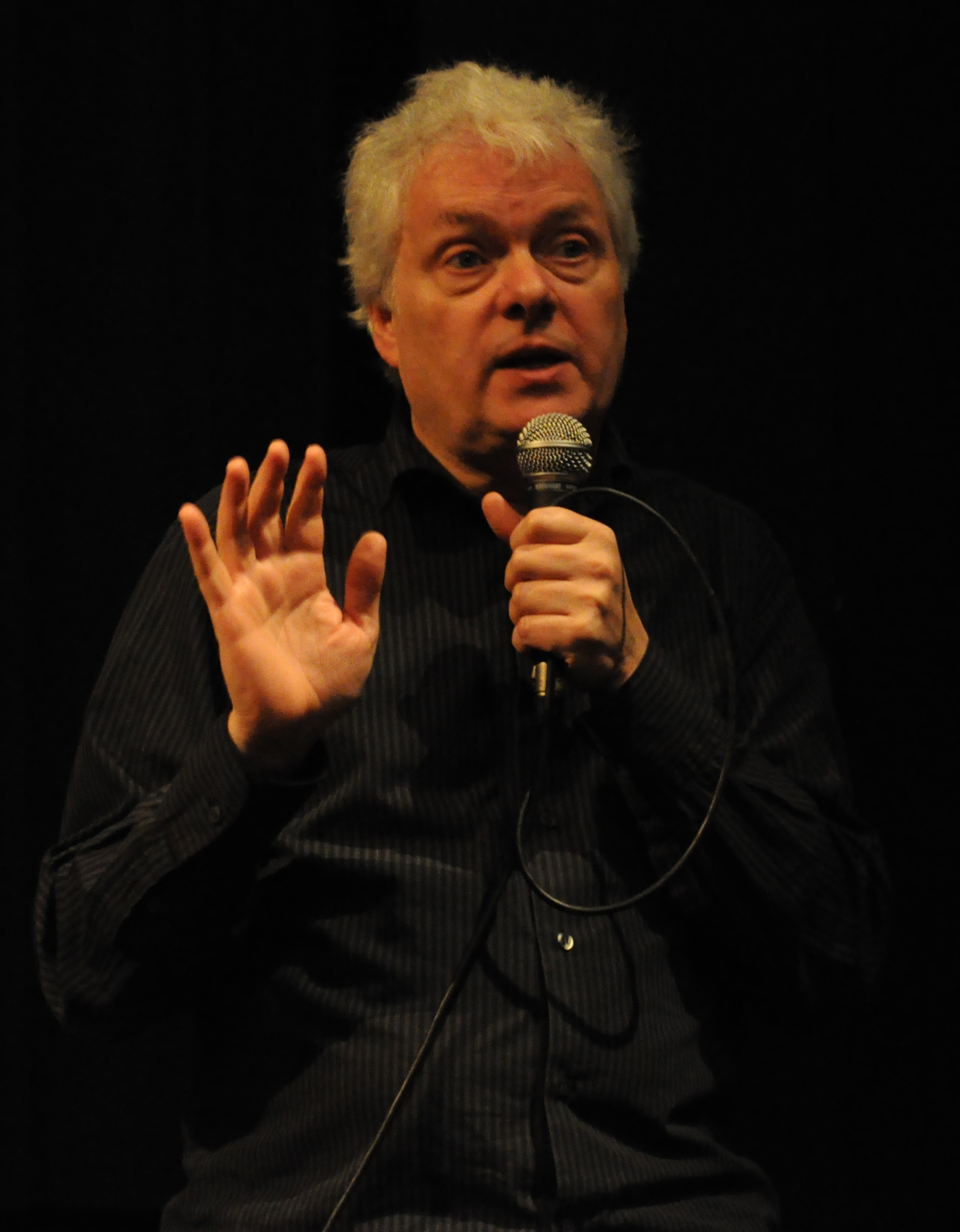

Heiner Goebbels (born 17 August 1952) is a German composer, conductor and professor at Justus-Liebig-University in Gießen and artistic director of the International Festival of the Arts Ruhrtriennale 2012–14. His composition Stifters Dinge (2007) received five votes in a 2017 Classic Voice poll of the greatest works of art music since 2000, and writers for The Guardian ranked his composition Hashirigaki (2000) the ninth greatest classical composition of the same period.

== Biography ==
Goebbels was born in Neustadt an der Weinstraße. He studied sociology and music in Frankfurt am Main, and has composed for ensemble and for large orchestra. He has created several prize-winning radio plays, staged concerts, and, since the early 1990s, music theatre works, which have been invited to the most important theatre and music festivals worldwide.

Goebbels and Alfred Harth were musical partners in the Duo Goebbels/Harth (1975–1988) who co-founded the wind band Sogenanntes Linksradikales Blasorchester (1976–1981) and the avant-rock group Cassiber (1982–1992) with Alfred Harth, Chris Cutler and Christoph Anders. They toured extensively across Europe, Asia and North America, and made five albums. In October 1983 Cassiber (minus Anders) joined Duck and Cover, commissioned for the 1983 Moers Festival at the request of festival director Burkhard Hennen to Alfred Harth, followed by a performance at the Berlin Jazz Festival in West Berlin, and by another in February 1984 in East Berlin.

Some of his better-known work originated from his close collaboration with the East German writer Heiner Müller, resulting in stage compositions as well as shorter pieces (concerts as well as audio plays) based on Müller texts, such as Verkommenes Ufer (Waste Shore, 1984), Die Befreiung des Prometheus (The Liberation of Prometheus, 1985), or Wolokolamsker Chaussee (Volokolamsk Highway, 1989). Goebbels' attempts to fill the space between theatre and opera has led to projects such as "Ou bien le débarquement désastreux" (Paris 1993), Schwarz auf Weiss (Black on White, 1996) and Die Wiederholung (The Repetition, 1995). The political nature of his work is often referred to by critics. His interest in Heiner Müller can partly be explained by the political character of Müller's texts, as may be the case with his interest in Bertolt Brecht and Hanns Eisler, works by the latter he used in composing his staged concert Eislermaterial (1998). 1998 he also created the music theatre play "Max Black" with words by Paul Valéry and others, in 2000 "Hashirigaki" after Gertrude Stein, 2002 his first opera "Landscape with distant relatives", 2004 the prize winning "Eraritjaritjaka" with words by Elias Canetti, followed 2007 by the performative installation "Stifters Dinge" which has been performed more than 300 times in four continents. 2007 followed the staged concert "Songs of Wars I have seen" with words by Gertrude Stein – a commission by the London Sinfonietta and the Orchestra of the Age of Enlightenment, 2008 "I went to the House but did not enter" with the Hilliard Ensemble and words by Maurice Blanchot, Samuel Beckett a.o. In 2012 he created "When the Mountain changed its clothing" with the Choir Carmina Slovenica, and staged John Cage's "Europeras 1&2" in 2012, Harry Partch's Delusion of the Fury in 2013 and Louis Andriessen's De Materie for the Ruhrtriennale International Festival of the Arts.

Goebbels' work is being increasingly acknowledged as he is being played and staged around the world and as his recordings are being published. He collaborated with the finest ensembles and orchestras – Ensemble Modern, Ensemble InterContemporain, Ensemble musikFabrik, Asko/Schönberg, Berg Orchestra, Berlin Philharmonic, Bochumer Symphoniker, Junge Deutsche Philharmonie, Brooklyn Philharmonic and many others and worked with conductors like Sir Simon Rattle, Péter Eötvös, Lothar Zagrosek, Peter Rundel, Steven Sloane and many others. In 2000 he collaborated with Piano Circus and composer Richard Harris to produce Scutigeras, which received a live BBC radio premiere in the UK. His Surrogate Cities, a work for big orchestra dating from 1994 and featuring texts from Paul Auster, Heiner Müller, and Hugo Hamilton, has been performed widely in Europe, the US and Australia and was nominated for a Grammy in the category Best Classical Contemporary Composition at the 43rd Grammy Awards in 2001. His Eislermaterial won him another Grammy nomination at the 46th Grammy Awards in 2004, this time in the category Best Small Ensemble Performance (with or without conductor).

His installative artwork "Stifters Dinge – the Unguided Tour" has been presented by Artangel in London (2012) and at the Ruhrtriennale in Duisburg (2013), "Genko-An" in Berlin (2008), Darmstadt Artists' Colony/Mathildenhöhe (2012), Musée d'art contemporain de Lyon (2014) and Moscow's NEW SPACE (2017). For the Centre Pompidou Paris he created the sound installations "Fin de Soleil" and "Timée"(2000) which was also exhibited at the ZKM Karlsruhe, the MACBA Barcelona, in Brugge and in Palazzo delle Esposizioni/Rome. He also closely collaborated on several video installations with visual artist Michal Rovner. 1982, 1987 and 1997 he participated with concerts, installative works and performing arts at the documenta in Kassel

Goebbels was a professor at Justus-Liebig-University in Gießen, Institute for Applied Theater Studies from 1999 until 2018, and teaches the European Graduate School in Saas-Fee, Switzerland. From 2006 until 2018 he was President of the Theater Academy of Hesse. In recent years Goebbels enjoyed the privilege of several guest professorships and nominations for composer-in-residence., he is member of several academies of arts (Berlin, Bensheim, Düsseldorf, Mainz, Munich), Fellow of the Institute of Advanced Studies in Berlin, Honorable Fellow at the Dartington College of the Arts and the Central School of Speech and Drama, London. In 2012 he was awarded an honorary doctorate by Birmingham City University, in 2018 by the National Academy for Theatre and Film Arts in Sofia (Bulgaria).

He received numerous awards and honours, such as Prix Italia, Europe Prize Theatrical Realities, and in 2012 the International Ibsen Award, one of the world's most prestigious theatre awards, for bringing "new artistic dimensions to the world of drama or theatre.".

In September 2010, it was announced that Goebbels was the artistic director designate for the 2012–14 seasons of the Ruhrtriennale.

As artistic director of this Festival Heiner Goebbels curated, produced and presented several new works by the artists Robert Wilson, Romeo Castellucci, Michal Rovner, Boris Charmatz, Robert Lepage, Jan Lauwers, Ryoji Ikeda, Douglas Gordon, William Forsythe, Lemi Ponifasio, Mathilde Monnier, Saburo Teshigawara, Anne Teresa De Keersmaeker, Rimini Protokoll, Tim Etchells, Gregor Schneider and many others.

His latest work, Everything that happened and would happen, was performed for the first time in October 2018 at Mayfield Depot in Manchester. It explores the history of Europe since World War I and combines live music, performance and film.

== Europe Theatre Prize ==
In 2001, he was awarded the Europe Prize Theatrical Realities, in Taormina, with the following motivation:

Beginning in the mid-80s, Heiner Goebbels has managed to reinvent musical theatre. Composer, director, musical arranger and playwright all wrapped up into one, Goebbels has worked with actors, singers, musicians, writers, artists and set designers from all over the world. His Konzeptionelles Komponieren, constructed using Heiner Muller's dialectic, Gertrude Stein's audacious linguistic constructions, pop music and philosophical tracts, allow the spectator to see the music, hear the space and experience the text with polished simplicity. Acoustic and visual elements are not merely juxtaposed in their on-stage associations but linked together by a multiplicity of inter-relationships. To accomplish this, the divining rod of a sense of humor serves as a necessary tool in his search for their very essence. Goebbels is one of the most important representatives of international music and avant-garde theatre, with an evocative aesthetic that is simultaneously unmistakable and inexhaustible.

== Works (selection) ==
=== Stage works ===
- When the Mountain Changed Its Clothing (2012) Music theatre for a girl's choir. Text: Jean Jacques Rousseau, Gertrude Stein, Adalbert Stifter, Alain Robbe-Grillet and others
- I went to the house but did not enter (2008) Scenic concert in three pictures for four male voices. Text: T.S. Eliot, Maurice Blanchot, Samuel Beckett, Franz Kafka. First performed at the Edinburgh Festival 2008 by the Hilliard Ensemble
- Stifters Dinge (2007) Installative Performance
- Eraritjaritjaka – musée de Phrases (2007) music theatre for actor and string quartett, words by Elias Canetti
- Landschaft mit entfernten Verwandten (2002) Opera for ensemble, choir and soloists. Texts and motifs by Giordano Bruno, Arthur Chapman/Estelle Philleo, T.S. Eliot, Francois Fénelon, Michel Foucault and others
- Hashirigaki (2000) music theatre with words by Getrude Stein
- ...meme soir (2000) music theatre
- Eislermaterial (1998) staged concert for Ensemble with music by Hanns Eisler
- Max Black (1998) music theatre with words by Georg Christooh Lichtenberg, Paul Valery, Ludwig Wittgenstein and Max Black
- Schwarz auf Weiss (1996) Music theatre for eighteen musicians. Text: Edgar Allan Poe, John Webster, T.S. Eliot, Maurice Blanchot
- Die Wiederholung / La Reprise / The Repetition (1995) music theatre with words by Sören Kierkegaard, Alain Robbe-Grillet and Prince
- Ou bien le débarquement désastreux (1993) music theatre with words by Joseph Conrad, Heiner Müller and Francis Ponge

=== Orchestra works ===
- Ou bien Sunyatta (2004) for kora, voice and orchestra
- Notiz einer Fanfare (2003) for big orchestra
- Aus einem Tagebuch (2002/03) Short diary entries for orchestra
- Walden (1998) for extended orchestra and speaker. Text: H. D. Thoreau
- Industry and Idleness (1998) for orchestra
- Surrogate Cities (1993/94) for mezzo-soprano, voice, sampler and big orchestra. Text: Heiner Müller, Hugo Hamilton, Paul Auster

=== Ensemble works ===
- Songs of Wars I Have Seen (2007) staged concert for ensemble with words by Gertrude Stein
- Schlachtenbeschreibung (2002) for baritone and ensemble with words by Leonardo da Vinci
- Samplersuite from Surrogate Cities (1994) for ensemble
- Herakles 2 (1992) for five brass players, drums and sampler
- La Jalousie (1991) Noises from a novel for speaker and ensemble. Text: Alain Robbe-Grillet
- SHADOW / Landscape with Argonauts (1990) with words by Edgar Allan Poe and Heiner Müller
- Befreiung (Liberation) (1989) Text: Rainald Goetz
- Red Run (1988/91) Nine Songs for Eleven Instruments
- Der Mann im Fahrstuhl/The Man in the Elevator (1988) with author Heiner Müller

=== Chamber music ===
- The Lovesong of J. Alfred Prufrock (T.S.Eliot), "The Excursion into the Mountains" (Franz Kafla), "Worstward Ho"(Samuel Beckett) (2008) for four voices
- Bagatellen (1986–2006) for violin and sampler and clarinet ad lib
- And We Said Good Bye (2002) from Landschaft mit entfernten Verwandten for flute, clarinet and playback-CD
- Harrypatari (1995/96) from Schwarz auf Weiß for zither, marimba, cimbalom, clavichord and e-bass
- In the Basement (1995/96) for oboe, clarinet, bassoon and electronic feed
- Toccata for Tea pot and Piccolo (1995/96) from Schwarz auf Weiß for Piccolo and tea pot

=== Installative works ===
- Maelstromsüdpol site specific installation with Heiner Müller, Erich Wonder 1987 (documenta Kassel), 1988 (ars electronica Linz and Berlin)
- Timée 2000 soundinstallation with words by Plato
- Fin du Soleil2000 soundinstallation
- Genko An 2008 (Berlin), 2012 (Darmstadt), 2014 (Lyon), 2017 (Moscow) site specific visual and sound-installation
- Stifters Dinge – The Unguided Tour 2012
