= Cassiber =

German avant-rock group

- From the left: Heiner Goebbels, Christoph Anders, Chris Cutler, Alfred Harth

Background information
- Origin: Germany
- Genre: Avant-rock
- Years active: 1982–1992
- Label: Recommended
- Past members: Christoph Anders; Chris Cutler; Heiner Goebbels; Alfred Harth

Cassiber were a German avant-rock group founded in 1982 by German composer and saxophonist Alfred Harth, German composer, music-theatre director and keyboardist Heiner Goebbels, English drummer Chris Cutler from Henry Cow and German guitarist Christoph Anders. They recorded five albums, toured extensively across Europe, Asia and North America, and disbanded in 1992.

Cassiber's music was a blend of speed-punk, free jazz and sampling which incorporated found sounds and news broadcasts. They were best known for the "frantic intensity" of their live performances. A Time Out critic wrote, "Cassiber play as if they only have a minute left to live." They were also noted for their style of playing, which was to "improvise 'completed pieces'".

== History ==
Chris Cutler first met Heiner Goebbels, Alfred Harth and Christoph Anders in 1977 through the So-Called Left-Radical Brass Band. In 1979 Anders and Harth had a punk band in Frankfurt am Main. Leading from this experience, in 1980 Harth produced the LP Es herrscht Uhu im Land on JAPO Records/ECM that included Anders and Goebbels and others with the idea of integrating punk rock, free jazz and classical music. This work triggered the wish within the Duo Goebbels/Harth to form a smaller group with a similar concept. Harth asked Anders and Cutler to join the Duo Goebbels/Harth and gave that new group the name "Kassiber", which was later changed by Anders to "Cassiber". In 1982, Cutler, Goebbels, Harth and Anders met at Etienne Conod's Sunrise Studio in Switzerland to record an album. Their approach was to "improvise 'completed pieces'", that is "to attempt spontaneously to produce already structured and arranged material". The result was a double LP Man or Monkey, which was well received in Germany and led to an invitation to perform at the 1982 Frankfurt Jazz Festival.

For the next ten years Cassiber toured Asia and North America and appeared at almost every major festival in Europe. Their live performances generally consisted of new pieces invented in real time, plus pieces from their albums played spontaneously without having learnt or rehearsed them. In May 1983 Cassiber (minus Anders) joined Duck and Cover, a group that Burkhard Hennen had asked Harth to put together for the Moers Festival as well as a later commission from the Berlin Jazz Festival, for a performance in West Berlin in October 1983, followed by another in February 1984 in East Berlin. In July 1983 Cassiber (again minus Anders) joined half of Italian progressive rock and Rock in Opposition band, Stormy Six to form Cassix (Cassiber/Stormy Six) for a public workshop and recording project in Italy. Harth left Cassiber in 1985 to found the avant-rock groups Gestalt et Jive and Vladimir Estragon; Cassiber continued as a trio. In October 1986 Cassiber performed at the 4th Festival International de Musique Actuelle de Victoriaville in Victoriaville, Quebec, Canada. In their last year they invited guests to perform with them, including Hannes Bauer and Dietmar Diesner.

As a quartet, Cassiber recorded two albums, Man or Monkey (1982) and Beauty and the Beast (1984). After Harth left they recorded two more albums, Perfect Worlds (1986) and A Face We All Know (1990), the latter dealing with issues surrounding the collapse of the Berlin Wall and incorporating texts from Thomas Pynchon's 1973 novel Gravity's Rainbow. A 1992 concert recorded in Tokyo with guest saxophonist Masami Shinoda was released in 1998 on one disc of a double CD, Live in Tokyo. The other disc comprised 1998 re-workings of the concert material by turntablist Otomo Yoshihide, who had been in the audience for the original concerts. The album recorded Shinoda's last performance (he died soon after Cassiber left Japan) and Cassiber's penultimate performance as a group. The material by Yoshihide was Ground Zero's valedictory project.

Cassiber's last concert was on 13 December 1992 at the Calouste Gulbenkian Foundation in Lisbon.

=== Name ===
According to Chris Cutler, Cassiber took their name from a Slavic slang word for a note or message smuggled out of prison. "Like 'The Beatles', we spelled it differently and it wasn't intended to 'mean' anything."

== Members ==
- Christoph Anders – vocals, synthesizer, organ, electric guitar, tenor saxophone, samples, violin
- Chris Cutler – acoustic and electric drums, noise, vocals
- Heiner Goebbels – piano, synthesizer, organ, violin, electric and acoustic guitar, bass guitar, samples, vocals
- Alfred Harth – alto, tenor and baritone saxophone, trumpet, trombone, clarinet, bass clarinet, cello, jaw harp, vocals

== Discography ==
=== Albums ===
- Man or Monkey? (1982, 2xLP, Riskant, Germany + CD Recommended Records, UK)
- Beauty and the Beast (1984, LP, Riskant, Germany + LP and CD Recommended Records, UK)
- Perfect Worlds (1986, LP, Recommended Records, UK)
- A Face We All Know (1988, CD, Recommended Records, UK)
- Live in Tokyo (1998, 2xCD, Recommended Records, UK)
- The Way It Was (2012, CD, Recommended Records, UK)

=== Singles ===
- "Time Running Out" (1984, one-sided 7", Recommended Records, UK) – issued with the subscription edition of the LP Beauty and the Beast

=== Compilations ===
- 1982–1992 (2013, 6 CDs + DVD, Recommended Records, UK) – also known as The Cassiber Box
