= Gestalt et Jive =

Gestalt et Jive were a multinational avant-rock group founded in West Germany in 1984 by multi-instrumentalist Alfred Harth, comprising Steve Beresford (UK), Anton Fier (US), Alfred Harth (FRG), Peter Hollinger (FRG), Ferdinand Richard (F) and Uwe Schmitt (FRG).

In 1980 Harth produced the LP Es herrscht Uhu im Land on JAPO/ECM with the idea of integrating punk rock, free jazz and classical music and followed this design throughout the 1980s in the groups Cassiber, Duck and Cover, Gestalt et Jive and Vladimir Estragon. During the years 1984 – 1988 Gestalt et Jive performed on many festivals including the Moers Festival, Jazz nad Odrą, Musique Action festival in Vendouvre-les Nancy and Festival International de Musique Actuelle de Victoriaville in Canada. After Beresford, Fier and Schmitt had left the group in 1985 Gestalt et Jive continued to work in trio with Harth, Hollinger and Richard.

== Name ==
Gestalt et Jive 's name refers to the group concept of intensively improvise song forms and using postmodern strategies. It also refers to the group's multinational origin.

Gestalt et Jive in 1986 F.l.t.r.:Alfred Harth, Peter Hollinger, Ferdinand Richard

== Members ==
- Steve Beresford – piano, farfisa organ, synth, guitar, vocals, trumpet, trombone
- Anton Fier – drums, Simmons Drums
- Alfred Harth - tenor saxophone, alto saxophone, clarinet, bass clarinet, trumpet, trombone, mouthpieces, vocals
- Peter Hollinger – drums, objects
- Ferdinand Richard - bass guitar, six string alto guitar
- Uwe Schmitt – drums

== Discography ==
- Nouvelle Cuisine with Steve Beresford, Anton Fier, Alfred Harth, Ferdinand Richard, Uwe Schmitt (LP, Moers Music, 1985)
- Gestalt et Jive with Alfred Harth, Ferdinand Richard, Peter Hollinger (LP, Creative Works Records, 1986)
- Neowise with Alfred Harth, Ferdinand Richard, Peter Hollinger, Steve Beresford, Al Maslakh, Lebanon 2020
- Live in Rhein-Main.For Holli with Alfred 23 Harth, Ferdinand Richard, Peter Hollinger, (2CD ADN, Italy 2025)
