= E.M.T. (band) =

Former experimental music group

- Origin: Germany, Sweden, Belgium
- Genres: Experimental, avant-garde, free improvisation
- Years active: 1972–1975
- Label: FMP
- Past members: Alfred Harth; Sven-Åke Johansson; Nicole van den Plas

E.M.T. (1972–1975) were an international experimental and free improvising music group with German multi-instrumentalist Alfred Harth, Swedish drummer and composer Sven-Åke Johansson, Belgian keyboarder and artist Nicole van den Plas and guests.

== History ==
In 1971, in search for a new artistic terrain, Alfred Harth moved from Frankfurt/Main to live nearby Antwerp in Belgium playing with pianist and artist Nicole Van den Plas in duo with guests as her brother cellist Jean Van den Plas and later in 1972 with German bassist Peter Kowald and drummer Paul Lovens a.o. in Bruges and Antwerp a.o.. In 1971 Harth together with Van den Plas stayed for three months at the Action Center in München where they played with Just Music cellist Thomas Stoewsand who had started to work for the label ECM and bass player Manfred Eicher.Harth was trying to persuade Just Music drummer Thomas Cremer to move to München and continue to work together. After having finished the group Just Music after a last tour in Poland in 1972 but keeping in regular touch with the Belgian free improvisation scene Harth and Van den Plas moved to live in Frankfurt/Main together with Cremer in Harth's apartment where musicians and artists regularly visited and where the idea came up to found a small music circus.

In 1968 Harth had performed with drummer Sven-Åke Johansson (Music is Happening) at the Zodiak Free Arts Lab in Berlin where they had sawed the stage as part of their music. Harth called up Johansson in 1972 and founded the trio E.M.T. with him and keyboarder Nicole Van den Plas who started to study art at the Städel art academy in Frankfurt/Main at that time. E.M.T. recorded for the label SAJ which had been founded by Sven-Åke Johansson and merged with the label FMP. E.M.T. extended gradually their musical language, included guests from time to time and played many concerts in venues as the Fabrik Hamburg, Quasimodo Berlin, Festival Antwerp. Johansson lived in Hamburg at that time and sent cassettes containing spoken ideas and musical samples as working letters to Harth and Van den Plas in Frankfurt.

In 1974, together with Jean Van den Plas, E.M.T. created a subformation Heidnische Klänge for a concert in Frankfurt/Main. In 1973/4, Harth was also a short time member in Gunter Hampel’s Galaxie Dreamband where he met loft jazz clarinet player Perry Robinson.
In 1975 E.M.T. had a last concert August 14th at Club King Kong in Antwerp after Harth went for three months to work with the loft jazz scene in New York City.

In 1979, Harth founded a punk jazz group with vocalist Christoph Anders, from the later group Cassiber, and asked Nicole Van den Plas to play the electric organ. In 2014, Nicole Van den Plas and Harth worked together for a CD Five Eyes, as well in 2016 for a CD Malcha.

== Music ==
E.M.T. started focusing on ecstatically free improvisation in an explosive and expressive manner. Over the years E.M.T. gradually extended their musical language by incorporating dada like spoken words and improvised recitations inspired by Schönberg (Pierrot Lunaire), noise, improvised structures and composition fragments from European composers like Grieg, Schumann (the song Ich grolle nicht) a.o. Harth extended his instruments to electric zither, contact mics, gongs, violin, accordion and percussion. Van den Plas played as well electric organ and Johansson integrated bowed cymbals and other concrete materials like playing on his drum cases or foam gum into his Slingerland called way of playing with dynamic vibrations. In long passages the music of EMT had been also silent, electronical sounding and minimalistic.

== Name ==
E.M.T. :

- Energy / Movement / Totale
- European Music Tradition
- Ecstasy / Mystic / Transcendence
- Elastic Music Theatre
- Extreme Music Troop – "Troop" in a sense like the German expression "Zirkus Truppe"

The name was given by Alfred Harth.

== Discography ==
- Canadian Cup of Coffee, FMP, 1974,
- E.M.T. vol.1 and vol.2, Laubhuette Production M12 a+b, 2008
- E.M.T. 1973, SAJ-CD 24, 2012
