= Alfred 23 Harth =

German artist, band leader, musician, and composer

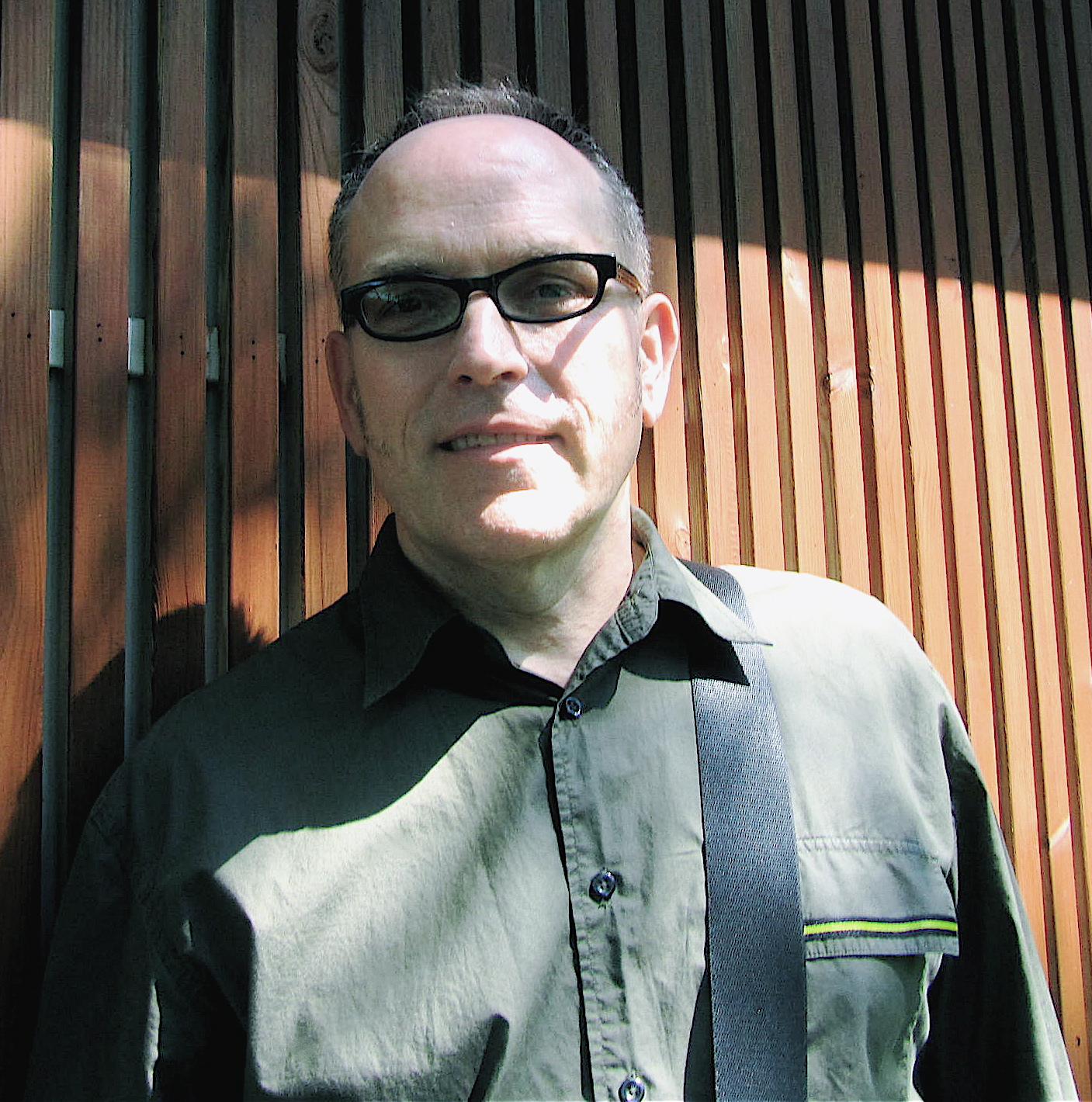
Alfred 23 Harth in 2012

Alfred Harth, now known as Alfred 23 Harth or A23H, is a German multimedia artist, band leader, multi-instrumentalist musician, and composer who creatively mixes genres.

== Career ==
Harth founded a free improvisation band, Just Music (1967 to 1972), which in 1969 was recording number 1002 on the Munich based label ECM. In 1967 he opened the platform centrum freier cunst in Frankfurt/Main — a meeting point for live free music, art exhibitions, experimental poetry, action, and happening events. He formed the group E.M.T. (1972 to 1975) with artist and pianist Nicole Van den Plas from Belgium and Sven-Åke Johansson from Sweden. E.M.T. implemented Dada elements, integrating European Music Tradition by using fragments of composers (Edvard Grieg, Schumann). In 1975 he had just returned from three months in New York City, playing there with some greats of the Loft scene: Perry Robinson, John Fischer, Jay Clayton, a.o. and met Heiner Goebbels in Frankfurt/Main with whom in 1976 he recorded a first LP Vier Fäuste für Hanns Eisler (FMP/SAJ 08), including works from Hanns Eisler as Duo Goebbels/Harth (1975 to 1988). Meanwhile, also having established the Sogenanntes Linksradikales Blasorchester to bring political music to the streets within student's protest actions, they played a lot of concerts and festivals all over Europe.

Harth's activities became more & more diversified: In 1980 he recorded a meeting of mixed styles from jazz, punk and classical music for the label JAPO/ECM. He invited Christoph Anders, Goebbels, Paul Lovens, composer Rolf Riehm, and Annemarie Roelofs for this project-LP, Es herrscht Uhu im Land using words by Kurt Schwitters a.o.. This record's musical program led to more focused work in the group Cassiber (with Anders, Chris Cutler, Goebbels and Harth) from 1982 on. The Duo Goebbels/Harth had become a highly creative nucleus for many enterprises. In 1983 Burkhard Hennen asked Harth to form an "all star" combination for the Moers Festival. This group became Duck and Cover for which he conceived a main structural composition idea in relation to contemporary politics. In 1984 the Duo Goebbels/Harth created a musical theatre piece, Nach Aschenfeld together with the author and director FK Waechter and actors Heinz Werner Kraehkamp and Michael Altmann. This was mounted at the Residenztheater in Munich where they played live within the stage scenery on a huge number of instruments, some partially self made, a kind of role model for Heiner Goebbels's Musik Theater in his later years. The same year Harth made an LP Melchior with his theatre composition for Frank Wedekind's play Spring Awakening at National Theatre Mannheim played by Bob Degen and himself and Cassiber put out its second CD, Beauty and the Beast, released in Germany and Great Britain.

In 1987 the Duo Goebbels/Harth had been recorded live at the Festival International de Musique Actuelle de Victoriaville in Canada and came to an end in 1988. In 1992 Harth managed to put out a best-of album in Japan, Goebbels Heart, and in 2007 a double CD of the duo's first two LPs, in Great Britain.

Parallel to the collaboration with Heiner Goebbels, Harth founded several groups during the 1980s, including a two time working project (LP This Earth! on ECM 1264 in 1983) with Paul Bley, Trilok Gurtu, Maggie Nicols, Barre Phillips and himself, then Notes On Planet Shikasta (1987, without Gurtu, additive Phil Minton) using fragmented words by Doris Lessing, and an international group Gestalt et Jive (1984 to 1988).

In 1984 Harth co-organized the Marry the World By Conference Call at the gallery ‘waschSalon’ which he maintained during the years 1984 to 1991, and where he also had invited William S. Burroughs for an exhibition of his Paintings On Paper. In 1985 Harth adapted the number 23 in his name and short name A23H. In 1986 A23H cooperated at the first under water concert organized by Micky Remann in a pool in Frankfurt (Guinness Book of Records).

Harth had a duo with John Zorn, and a trio with Peter Brötzmann and Sonny Sharrock in 1986/7.

In 1989 Harth created the performance Wenn Gott tot ist, dann ist er im Himmel with a sound collage of original interviews with Jean Baudrillard, Villem Flusser, Friedrich Kittler a.o., and composed the CD Sweet Paris in 1990 which implements recorded German texts read by foreign language speaking street pedestrians in Paris.

During the transition phase of the opening of the East Harth was a member of Lindsay Cooper's group Oh Moscow (1987 to 1993, words by singer and film director Sally Potter), he had founded a postmodern group Vladimir Estragon (1988/89, comprising Einstürzende Neubauten drummer FM Einheit) referring in its titles to Samuel Beckett and James Joyce, a Trio Trabant a Roma (1990/1, Lindsay Cooper, Phil Minton, himself), a duo Parcours Bleu a Deux with Heinz Sauer (1990 to 1992), and a QuasarQuartet (1992/3, Simon Nabatov, Vitold Rek/Mark Dresser, Vladimir Tarasov, himself). 1993 to 1995 Harth worked out his art project Gedankenhotel that had no audiences, but just events with 10 "guests" that had been documented in 10 maps. Also in 1993 he formed the FIM (1993 to 2001, Frankfurts Indeterminables Musiqwesen) a platform for many local avantgarde music activities including the group Imperial Hoot (1998 to 2000).

In 1995 Harth created a first dedication to Korea in a Deutsches Jazz Festival Frankfurt event Han Guk – Land des unerfüllten Wunsches together with Dougie Bowne, Fred Hopkins, David Murray and himself. In 1996 he produced a re-mix CD album Pollock using out-of-print Alfred Harth LPs, and triggered an internet label recout. In 1997-8 he re-arranged, conducted, and performed the West Side Story at the main theatre in Frankfurt.

In 2000 Harth formed the Trio Viriditas (2000 to 2002) in New York together with Wilber Morris and Kevin Norton. Harth and his wife, the Korean artist Yi Soonjoo, wanted to relocate to New York where they both had a grant at OMI/New York, but then in 2001 to 2002 they had a grant at Ssamzie Space in Seoul and loved to stay on where Harth created the LaubhuetteStudio Seoul. There in the years 2003 to 2006, he produced a Mother of Pearl-CD series of five editions including a DVD containing animated sequences of his drawings. Each disc devoted to a specific Korean theme, inviting also many Korean musicians to contribute their sound sources to this project.

In 2004 Harth became a member in Otomo Yoshihide's Japanese formations for almost five years. He composed for Korean ballet and on a recent solo disc micro saxo-phone, edition III (2011, released in the US on KSE), he had been experimenting with rudimentary "doublespeak" texts besides using contact microphones to "electrify" his saxophones by the means of electric devices as the Kaoss Pad a.o. Also he even bows the contrabass clarinet and saxophone bodies, as well amplifying the keys, the saliva and needle springs to extend once more the saxophone's language since he began to "electrify" his saxophone on the LP Plan Eden (Creative Works Records) in 1986.

In 2007 Harth created the European quartet 7k Oaks together with Massimo Pupillo (Zu), Fabrizio Spera and Luca Venitucci in Rome. In 2008 he had a premiere on a tour in Switzerland with the trio Taste Tribes together with Guenter Mueller and Hans Joachim Irmler from the legendary group Faust. In 2009 Harth formed the duo Gift Fig together with composer Carl Stone by the premiere of Adler_Kino 1166 – 1215 in Frankfurt/Main. In 2013 Torsten Müller (musician) and A23H toured in North West America including a performance at the Vancouver International Jazz Festival. Harth took part in the exhibitions The Name Is Burroughs - Expanded Media 2012 at ZKM Karlsruhe, Real DMZ 2013 at Artsonje Center/Seoul and Universal Studios, 2014 at Seoul Museum of Art, 2016 sound art cooperation with the Korean artist Sora Kim at National Museum of Modern and Contemporary Art (MMCA), Korea.

To play Lindsay Cooper's music Harth took part in Henry Cow, Music for Films, News from Babel and Oh Moscow at the Barbican Centre, London on 21 November as part of the EFG London Jazz Festival; at the Lawrence Batley Theatre, Huddersfield on 22 November as part of the Huddersfield Contemporary Music Festival and at the Teatro Diego Fabbri in Forlì, Italy on 23 November 2014. In 2015 he collaborated with Chris Cutler founding a group Hope, a commission for the 46th Deutsches Jazzfestival with Kazuhisa Uchihashi, Mitsuru Nasuno. In 2018 Harth toured with his group Revolver 23 by an invitation by the Jazz in Autumn Festival in Moscow. In 2019 he was invited to show his art work at the Seongbuk Documenta 6 at the Choi Manlin Museum in Seoul, in 2020 he participated at the JazzKorea Festival Alive!. Alfred Harth is an Honorary Citizen of Seoul.

A23H founded many other bands, composes for film, TV, theatre, ballet, radio plays, and has exhibitions of his art works. Since 2011 A23H extends his Far East radius by also touring in China with the Shanghai Quintet and working in Hong Kong/Macao.

== Group formations and discography (selection) ==
Just Music – A23H/Thomas Cremer/Dieter Herrmann/Johannes Krämer/Thomas Stoewsand/Witold Teplitz/ Peter Stock/Franz Volhard :

- Just Music ECM1002, Germany, 1969
- 4.Januar 1970 - A23H/Nicole Van den Plas/Thomas Cremer/Peter Stock/Franz Volhard, 1970
- Born Free CBS, 1970

E.M.T. – A23H/Sven-Åke Johansson/Nicole van den Plas :

- Canadian Cup of Coffee FMP, 1974
- E.M.T. live at Fabrik Hamburg in 1973, SAJ-CD, 2012

Duo Goebbels/Harth:

- Vier Faeuste fuer Hanns Eisler FMP, 1976 +Recommended Records, 2007
- Vom Sprengen des Gartens FMP, 1978+Recommended Records, 2007
- Indianer fuer Morgn Riskant, 1981
- Zeit wird knapp Riskant, 1981
- Frankfurt/Peking Riskant, 1984
- Live in Victoriaville victo, LP + CD, 1987
- Goebbels Heart evva, 1992

Sogenanntes Linksradikales Blasorchester ("So-called left-radical brass band"):

- Mit Gelben Birnen Trikont, 1977/80 + DoubleCD in 1999

Cassiber – A23H/Christoph Anders/Chris Cutler/Heiner Goebbels :

- Man or Monkey? (2xLP Riskant, Germany + CD Recommended Records, UK)), 1982
- Beauty and the Beast (LP Riskant, Germany + LP and CD Recommended Records, UK), 1984
- The Cassiber Box, 6 CDs + DVD Recommended Records, UK, 2013

Duck and Cover – A23H/Tom Cora/Chris Cutler/Fred Frith/Heiner Goebbels/Dagmar Krause/George E. Lewis :

- Rē Records Quarterly Vol.1 No.2 Recommended Records, 1986

Gestalt et Jive – A23H/Steve Beresford/Anton Fier/Peter Hollinger/Ferdinand Richard/Uwe Schmitt :

- Nouvelle Cuisine Moers Music, Germany 1985
- Gestalt et Jive Trio Creative Works Records, Switzerland 1986
- Neowise, Al Maslakh, Lebanon 2020
- Live in Rhein-Main.For Holli (2CD ADN, Italy 2025)

Duo Alfred 23 Harth/John Zorn :

- Anything Goes Creative Works Records, 1986
- Plan Eden Creative Works Records, 1987

Duo Brötzmann/23 Harth :

- Go-No-Go FMP, 1987

Lindsay Cooper's OH MOSCOW – A23H/Lindsay Cooper/Hugh Hopper/Marilyn Mazur/ Phil Minton/Elvira Plenar/Sally Potter :

- Oh Moscow (victo, Canada, 1989)

Vladimir Estragon – A23H/FM Einheit/Ulrike Haage/Phil Minton :

- Three Quarks For Muster Mark enja/tiptoe, LP + CD 1989

Domestic Stories – A23H/Chris Cutler/Fred Frith/Lutz Glandien/Dagmar Krause :

- Domestic Stories Recommended Records, UK 1991

QuasarQuartet – A23H/Simon Nabatov/Vladimir Tarasov/Vitold Rek)

- POPendingEYE free flow music, 1992

Trio Trabant a Roma – A23H/Lindsay Cooper/Phil Minton :

- State Of Volgograd FMP, 1994

Imperial Hoot – A23H/Guenter Bozem/Marcel Daemgen/Christoph Korn :

- Secrets of Development Blue Noises, 1999

Trio Viriditas – A23H/Wilber Morris/Kevin Norton)

- waxwebwind@ebroadway Clean Feed Records, Portugal, 2002
- Live at Vision Festival VI Clean Feed Records, 2008

Otomo Yoshihide New Jazz Orchestra (ONJO) – A23H/Otomo Yoshihide/ Sachiko M/Axel Dörner/Mats Gustafsson/Toshimaru Nakamura/Cor Fuhler/Tsugami Kenta/Aoki Taisei/Okura Masahiko/Ishikawa Ko/Unami Taku/Takara Kumiko/Kahimi Karie/Mizutani Hiroaki/Yoshigaki Yasuhiro)

- ONJO Doubtmusic, Japan, 2005
- Out to Lunch Doubtmusic, 2005
- ONJO live Vol.1 series circuit Doubtmusic, 2007
- ONJO live Vol.2 parallel circuit Doubtmusic, 2007

Otomo Yoshihide's Invisible Songs – A23H/Otomo Yoshihide/Yoshigaki Yasuhiro/Kahimi Karie/Leonid Soybelman/Kondo Tatsuo/Nasuno Mitsuru/Kawai Shinobu/ Yamamoto Seiichi/ Jim O'Rourke

- Sora East Works Entertainment, Japan, 2007

7k Oaks – A23H/Luca Venitucci/Massimo Pupillo/Fabrizio Spera

- 7000 Oaks Die Schachtel, Italy, 2007
- Entelechy Die Schachtel, 2011

Taste Tribes – A23H/Guenter Mueller/Hans Joachim Irmler/samples by Eruption & Kawabata Makoto

- Taste Tribes For4ears, Switzerland, 2008
- Nischen Moloko Plus Records, 2023

Duo Gift Fig – A23H/Carl Stone

- Gift Fig, KSE, USA, 2012

Revolver 23 – A23H/Nicola L. Hein/Marcel Daemgen/Joerg Fischer

- Kirschblüten mit verstecktem Sprengstoff, Moloko Plus, Germany, 2019

== Discography of special projects (selection) ==
- "Es herrscht Uhu im Land" JAPO/ECM – A23H/Christoph Anders/Heiner Goebbels/Paul Lovens/Rolf Riehm/Annemarie Roelofs, 1981
- "This Earth!" ECM1264 – A23H/Paul Bley/Trilok Gurtu/Maggie Nicols/Barre Phillips, 1983
- "Sweet Paris" free flow music, 1991
- "Pollock" Orkestrion Schallfolien, – A23H/Peter Fey/Frank Rothkamm/Elliott Sharp, 1996
- print-on-demand internet-label "recout.de" : 1996–2000
- cottage industry label LaubhuetteStudio, since 2002

MOTHER-OF-PEARL-SERIES (1.-5., made in Korea), 2003–2006 :

- 1. "eShip sum" /
- 2. "nu:clear re:actor"
- 3. DVD "T_error" / CD "kr ./. jp" /
- 4. "Seoul Milk"
- 5. "NUN"

Expedition (New York) – A23H/Chris Dahlgren/Jay Rosen/Hans Tammen

- Expedition ESP-Disk, USA 2006

Homura Trio (Seoul) – A23H/Yoriyuki Harada/Choi Sun Bae

- Homura off note, Japan 2007

Dead Country (Istanbul) – Şevket Akinci/Umut Çağlar/Murat Çopur/Kerem Öktem/A23H

- Gestalt et Death Al Maslakh, 2012

The Expats (Tokyo) - Samm Bennett/Carl Stone/Kazuhisa Uchihashi/A23H

- The Expats, KSE, USA 2013

concept recordings

- micro-saxo-phone series, vol.II on Laubhuette Productions, 2008, vol.III + IV on KSE, USA 2011 + 2013
- As Yves Drew A Line.Estate, Re Records Hong Kong, 2013
- Five Eyes, Moloko Plus, 2014 - A23H/ Nicole Van den Plas/Wolfgang Seidel, Germany
- Malcha, Moloko Plus, 2016 - A23H/ Nicole Van den Plas/Wolfgang Seidel/Fabrizio Spera
- Campanula, Moloko Plus, 2017 - A23H/John Bell
- Zisch! Split-LP w/Jonathan Meese/Mama Baer&Kommissar Hjuler, Germany, 2017
- Laubhuette Productions, Moloko Plus, 2020
- Sweet Paris Reloaded, Moloko Plus, 2022
