= Katharina Franck =

German singer-songwriter

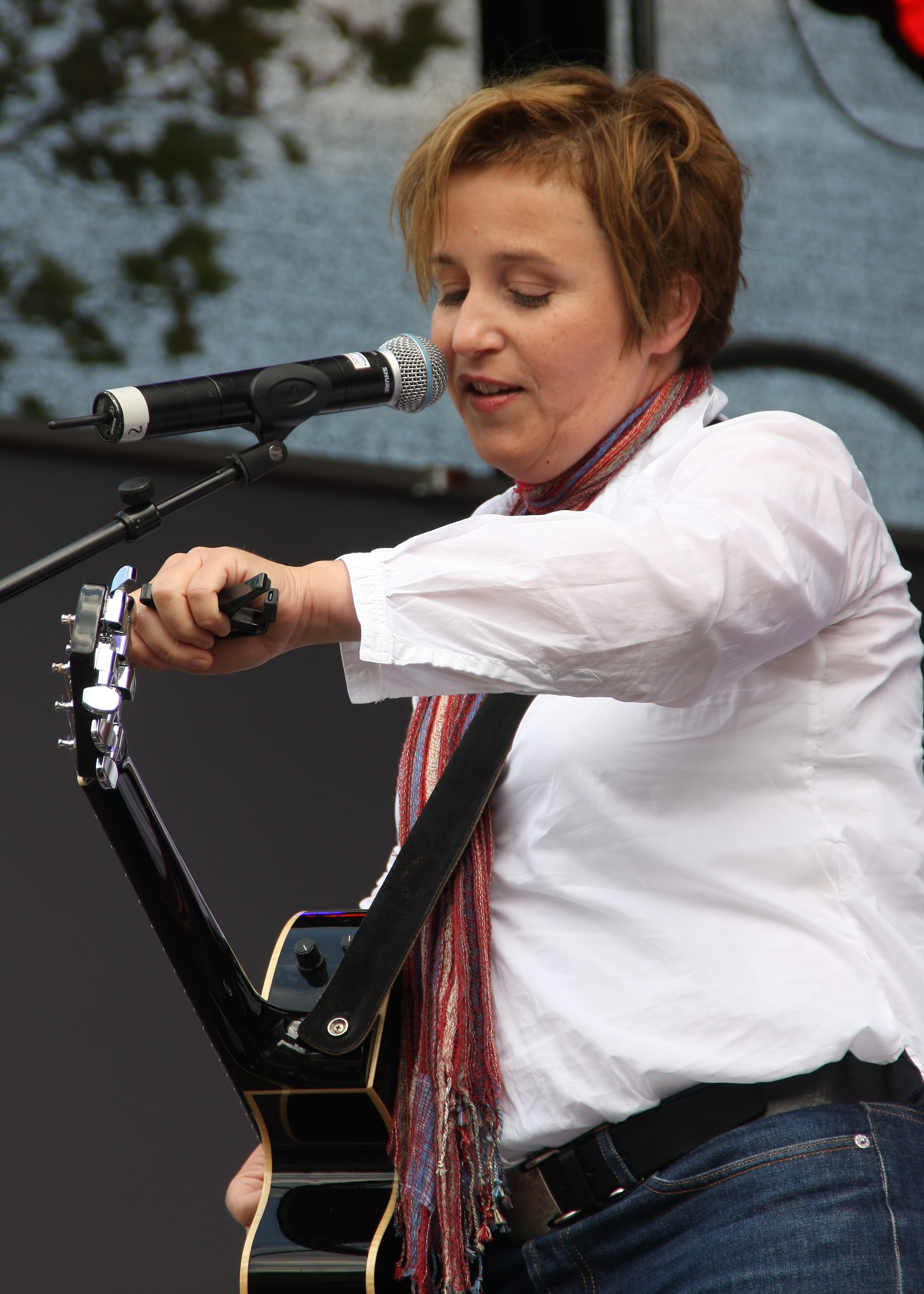
- Franck at Cologne Pride, 2009

Background information
- Born: July 28, 1963 (age 63)
- Origin: Düsseldorf, West Germany
- Genres: Pop rock
- Occupations: Singer; songwriter; musician
- Years active: 1980s–present
- Labels: Sans Soleil; Mute; Skycap; Premium Records
- Website: katharinafranck.de

Katharina Franck (born July 28, 1963) is a West Germany / Germany singer, songwriter, and musician. She first achieved fame as singer, songwriter, and guitarist of pop rock band the Rainbirds in the late 1980s. Besides her work with Rainbirds, she was also a member of the band Stein, and has released several solo albums.

== Biography ==
Katharina Franck was born in Düsseldorf, West Germany, but spent her childhood in Estado Novo (Portugal) because her father worked there as a Thyssen AG representative. From 1974 to 1977 she lived in São Paulo, Military dictatorship in Brazil, where she first started playing guitar and writing songs in English. She then moved back to Portugal, and formed her first band, having both her first stage and studio experiences.

In 1981, at the age of 18, she moved to Cologne, West Germany. Her first attempts at the cut-up technique, poetry and prose in German followed. At the pop course at the Hamburg University of Music and Drama she took her first singing lessons. In 1983 she moved to West Berlin and initially kept herself afloat with part-time jobs. In 1985 she became a member of the band Les Black Carnations, where she operated under the name Justine Time.

In the spring of 1986 she founded the band Rainbirds, with which she won the Berlin Senate Rock Competition and was then offered a recording contract by the record label Mercury. The single "Blueprint" became a European hit in 1988. They went through various line-ups over the years, and have released a total of six studio albums. Yonder their latest album was released in 2014.

From 1990 to 1994, while still with Rainbirds, she was also a member of the band Stein (which included her Rainbirds band member, Ulrike Haage), with which she released three albums.

With Haage, she has worked on two radio plays focusing on the life and work of Jane Bowles, 1999's "Bei unserer Lebensweise ist es sehr angenehm, lange im voraus zu einer Party eingeladen zu werden" ("Living the Way We Do, It Is Delightful to Be Invited to a Party a Long Way Off") and 2005's "Ich war fischen" ("I Was Fishing").

Franck has also released several solo albums: "Hunger" ("spoken pop songs" set to music by Haage) (in English and in German) in 1997; "Zeitlupenkino" (2002) (in German); "First Take Second Skin" (2006) (in English); and "On the Verge of an Autobiography" (2008) (in English).

== Personal life ==
Franck has been living in Neuruppin since 2012, and her partner lives in Neukölln, Berlin. Her mother lives in Portugal.

== Discography ==
=== Rainbirds ===
- Rainbirds (1987)
- Call Me Easy, Say I'm Strong, Love Me My Way, It Ain't Wrong (1989)
- Two Faces (1991)
- In a Different Light (1993)
- The Mercury Years (1995)
- Making Memory(1996)
- Forever (1997)
- 3000.live(1999)
- Yonder (2014)

=== Katharina Franck (solo) ===
- Hunger (1997)
- Zeitlupenkino (2002), Mute Records
- First Take Second Skin (2006)
- On the Verge of an Autobiography (2008)
- Musik! Musik! (2018)

=== Franck & Haage ===
- Bei unserer Lebensweise ist es sehr angenehm, lange im voraus zu einer Party eingeladen zu werden (1999)

=== Stein ===
- Stein (1990)
- Steinzeit (1992)
- König Zucker (1994)

=== Special appearances ===
- Members of the Ocean Club (1996/2004)
- Seven Dances of the Holy Ghost (1998)
- Coisário (1999)
- Edgar Allan Poe - Visonen (2006)
