= Deutsches Jazzfestival =

Jazz festival in Frankfurt, Germany

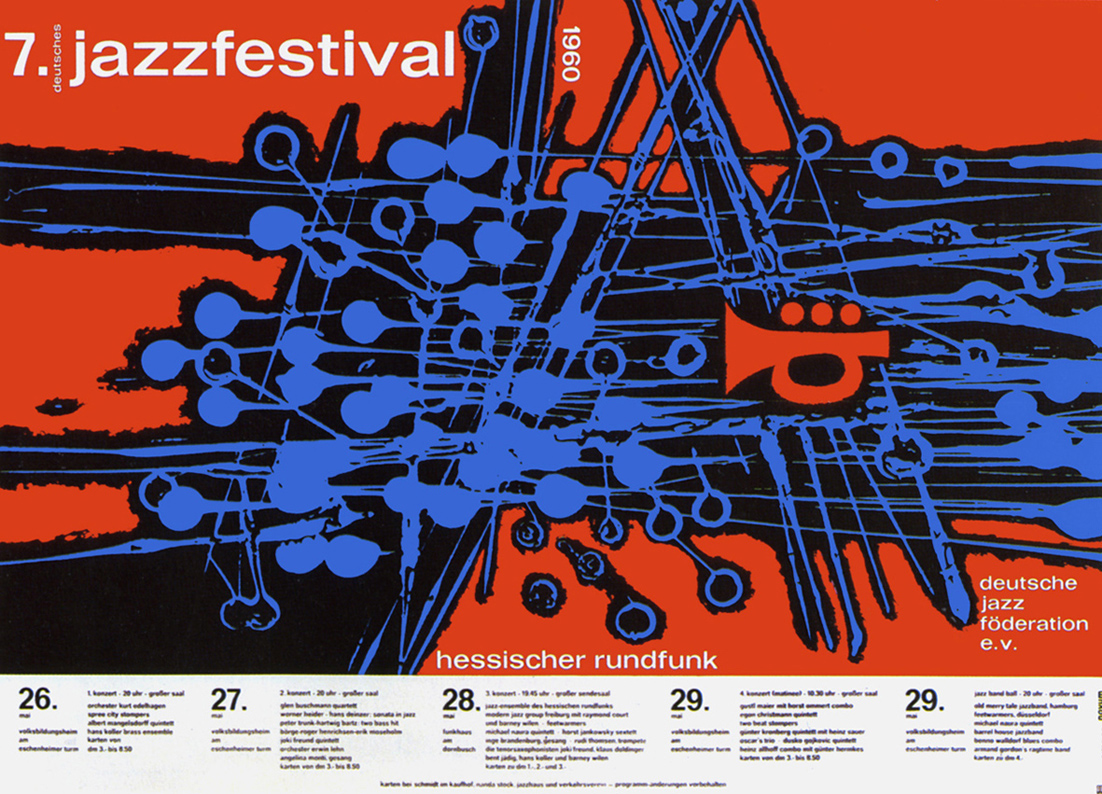
Poster for the 1960 Jazz Festival

The Deutsches Jazzfestival (German Jazz Festival) is an annual jazz festival in Frankfurt, Germany. Staged since 1953 in Frankfurt-am-Main, it is the oldest German Jazz Festival and it is the oldest continually held jazz festival in the world.

== History ==
The festival was first organised by the German Jazz Federation as an exhibition aiming to showcase the best that Germany had to offer in jazz, as explained by Olaf Hudtwalcker at the opening of the first festival (3 May 1953). In fact, there was no significant German musician that has not played at the Frankfurt Festival. The festival was in the 1950s the annual jazz event in West-Germany and provided the main impetus for German jazz.

With the advent of other festivals in the 1960s, the festival had to take more into account the international scene. Most significant German musicians, however, were away from the everyday routine, collaborating with prominent jazz musicians from Europe and non-European countries, especially in North America. The festival allowed the meeting of Volker Kriegel with Alan Skidmore (1972), Heinz Sauer with George Adams (1978), Peter Giger with Archie Shepp (1980), Alfred Harth with David Murray (1995) and Eberhard Weber with Pharoah Sanders (1997). Caterina Valente, Theo Jörgensmann, Markus Stockhausen, Lauren Newton, Christof Lauer, Michael Sagmeister, Torsten de Winkel and Christopher Dell all started out at the festival as "newcomers".

In the course of its existence, the central organization of the festival has changed: The German Jazz Federation no longer belongs to the organizers; unlike its first decades it is no longer organised by Lippmann and Rau. 1984 saw the local broadcaster Hessischer Rundfunk becoming the organizer of the festival, and since 1990 the City of Frankfurt itself has acted as a solid partner. The festival is now fully broadcast on the radio.

Between the 1960s and the 1980s, the event was held every two years. Since the early 1990s, it is again being held annually, just as it was in the first decade of its existence.

== Sources ==
- Jürgen Schwab: Der Frankfurt-Sound. Eine Stadt und ihre Jazzgeschichte(n). Societäts-Verlag, Frankfurt a. M. 2005, ISBN 3-7973-0888-4
- Bernhard Koßmann/Hessischer Rundfunk (Hrsg.): Bestandsverzeichnis 11 - Deutsches Jazz-Festival 1953-1992, Frankfurt a. M. 1994.
