= Rainbirds =

German pop rock band

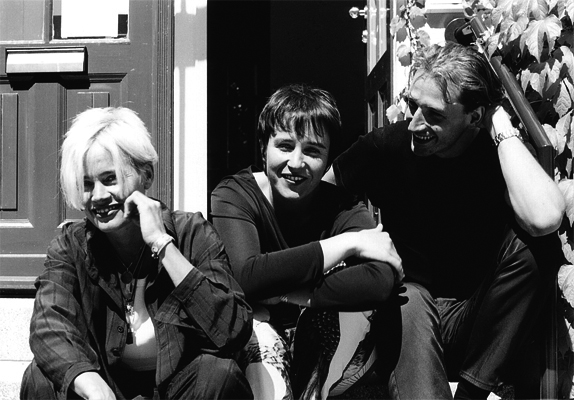
- From left to right: Haage, Franck, Lorenz

Background information
- Origin: Berlin, Germany
- Genre: Pop rock
- Years active: 1986–1999; 2013–present
- Label: Mercury
- Members: Katharina Franck; Bela Brauckmann; Gunter Papperitz
- Past members: Ulrike Haage; Tim Lorenz; Rodrigo González; Michael Beckmann; Wolfgang Glum
- Website: rainbirds.com

The Rainbirds are a German pop rock band established in 1986 around singer Katharina Franck. Their greatest hit is the song "Blueprint".

== History ==
The band formed in 1986 and named themselves after an instrumental track by Tom Waits. When they won the Rock competition of the Senate of Berlin, they were contracted by Mercury Records. Their first album Rainbirds was produced in the Audio Studios of Berlin and became a success, the single "Blueprint" enjoyed attention across Europe in 1988. The band's first line-up included Katharina Franck (guitar, vocals), Michael Beckmann (bass), and Wolfgang Glum (drums). Due to a concert tour, guitarist Rodrigo González became a member of the Rainbirds. Later he joined Die Ärzte and Abwärts.

In the spring of 1989, the second album Call Me Easy, Say I'm Strong, Love Me My Way, It Ain't Wrong was released, with a video clip by director and photographer Anton Corbijn. Corbijn who was known for his photographs of bands like Depeche Mode and U2 became the Rainbird's favourite photographer in the following years.

After this album, the band separated and Katharina Franck reformed the Rainbirds as a duo with piano player Ulrike Haage. They released two albums in this line-up: Two Faces (1991) and In a Different Light (1993). Drummer Tim Lorenz joined them in 1994 as a third member. In the following years the band published two studio albums, Making Memory (1996) and Forever (1997), as well as a live album rainbirds3000.live (1999), their last release.

=== Solo careers ===
Katharina Franck continued a solo career that had already begun in 1997 with a spoken word album Hunger and published a second solo album Zeitlupenkino (lit. slow motion cinema) on Mute Records in 2002.

Also Ulrike Haage, after recording numerous audio plays and composing theatre music, presented a solo album Sélavy in 2004. Drummer Tim Lorenz operates a recording studio in Berlin.

=== Reformation ===
In 2013, the Rainbirds reformed with a new line-up. Prior to the re-release of their remastered debut album Rainbirds, it was announced in September 2013 that a new album had been recorded with Katharina Franck as singer, drummer Bela Brauckmann, and electronic musician Gunter Papperitz. This new album, Yonder, was released in May 2014.

== Discography ==
=== Albums ===
Year	Title	Peak positions		
Year	Title	AUT	GER	SWI
1987	Rainbirds	–	2	21
1989	Call Me Easy, Say I'm Strong, Love Me My Way, It Ain't Wrong	28	4	18
1991	Two Faces	–	–	–
1993	In a Different Light	–	89	–
1995	The Mercury Years	–	–	–
1996	Making Memory	–	–	–
1997	Forever	–	–	–
1999	rainbirds3000.live	–	–	–
2014	Yonder	–	–	–

=== Singles ===
Year	Title	Peak positions			Album
Year	Title	AUS	GER	SWI	Album
1987	"Blueprint"	149	7	–	Rainbirds
1988	"Boy on the Beach"	–	57	–	Rainbirds
1989	"Sea of Time"	–	39	–	Call Me Easy, Say I'm Strong, Love Me My Way, It Ain't Wrong
1989	"Not Exactly"	–	58	–	Call Me Easy, Say I'm Strong, Love Me My Way, It Ain't Wrong
1989	"Love Is a Better Word (White City of Light)"	–	–	–	Call Me Easy, Say I'm Strong, Love Me My Way, It Ain't Wrong
1991	"Two Faces"	–	–	–	Two Faces
1993	"Devil's Dance"	–	–	–	In a Different Light
1993	"Jamais Jamais"	–	–	–	In a Different Light
1995	"Blueprint" (new mix)	–	–	–	The Mercury Years
1996	"Absolutely Free"	–	–	–	Making Memory
1996	"Give Me a Kiss"	–	–	–	Making Memory
1997	"Don't Cry a River for Me (Be Cool)"	–	–	–	Forever
1997	"Shoot from the Hip"	–	–	–	Forever
