= Tatsuo Kondō =

Japanese photographer

Tatsuo Kondō (近藤 龍夫, Kondō Tatsuo; 1916–1992) was a Japanese photographer.
