= Duck and Cover (German band) =

Multinational avant-rock group

- Duck and Cover performing at the Berliner Ensemble in East Berlin on 16 February 1984.

Background information
- Origin: Germany
- Genres: Avant-rock, free improvisation
- Years active: 1983–1984
- Label: Recommended
- Past members: Tom Cora; Chris Cutler; Fred Frith; Heiner Goebbels; Alfred Harth; Dagmar Krause; George Lewis

Duck and Cover were a multinational avant-rock septet founded in West Germany in 1983, comprising Chris Cutler (UK), Heiner Goebbels (GER), and Alfred Harth (GER) from Cassiber; Tom Cora (US) and Fred Frith (UK) from Skeleton Crew; Dagmar Krause (GER) from Art Bears; and George Lewis (US) from the ICP Orchestra. The ensemble was initially commissioned for the 1983 Moers Festival at the request of festival director Burkhard Hennen to Alfred Harth.

Duck and Cover performed a 45-minute musical piece entitled "Berlin Programme" at the Berlin Jazz Festival in October 1983 in West Berlin, and again at the Festival of Political Songs in East Berlin in February 1984. Both performances were recorded and broadcast nationally. An edited version of the East Berlin broadcast was released in September 1985 on one side of the Rē Records Quarterly Vol.1 No.2 LP record.

== Name ==
Duck and Cover's name was taken from the duck and cover drill taught to school children in the United States between the late 1940s and the 1980s in the event of a nuclear attack. The escalation of Cold War hostilities between the United States and the Soviet Union in the early 1980s and the Europe-wide protests in 1983 at the deployment of Cruise, Pershing II and SS-20 missiles were the motivation behind the formation of this ensemble and its music. Before the second performance of the "Berlin Programme" in East Berlin, Heiner Goebbels made the following statement:

The idea for this programme came up in Autumn 83 when millions of people all over Europe and America were demonstrating against the installation of Cruise Missiles, Pershings, and SS 20's. In Germany there were several symbolic blockades of the sites planned for the emplacement of these missiles. Günther Anders, an 84-year-old German philosopher, said about these blockades (on the occasion of accepting the Adorno prize in Frankfurt): "Symbole mögen tief sein. Hören wir auf mit Tiefe, seien wir effektiv" (Symbols can be deep, but let's stop being deep, let's be effective). To be effective was hard for us, as musicians, especially at a Jazz Festival (in West Berlin) – and now at this Festival of Political Songs, after the weapons have been stationed. What we could do – and have done is to abandon the safety of our normal programme, and open it up to the expression of the unsafeness of these times.

== "Berlin Programme" ==
The "Berlin Programme" performance was based on a structure which had been designed by Alfred Harth and written by Heiner Goebbels using fragments of compositions by Heiner Goebbels/Alfred Harth (Duo Goebbels/Harth), Cutler/Frith (Art Bears) and Bertolt Brecht/Hanns Eisler plus improvisation by all members of the ensemble.

The first performance was at the Berlin Jazz Festival in West Berlin on 29 October 1983. The 45-minute show was recorded by West Berlin Radio (RIAS) and broadcast on 28 August 1984. The songs used were:

- "Rats and Monkeys" (Cutler/Frith)
- "The Song of Investment Capital Overseas" (Cutler/Frith)
- "Kein Kriegsspielzeug Für Jonathan" (Duo Goebbels/Harth)
- "Easter Day 1935" (Brecht/Eisler)
- "Dunkle Wolk" (Duo Goebbels/Harth)
- "Und Ich Werde Nicht Mehr Sehen" (Brecht/Eisler)
- "Freedom" (Cutler/Frith)

The second performance took place at the Berliner Ensemble in East Berlin on 16 February 1984, and was recorded and mixed by radio engineers from Rundfunk der DDR directly onto ¼" master tape. This 40-minute performance was broadcast across East Germany later in February 1984, and contained the following pieces:

- "3000 Explosions"
- "Dark Cloud" (Duo Goebbels/Harth)
- "Walls are Loosening" (Cutler/Frith)
- "Rats and Monkeys" (Cutler/Frith)
- "Pause"
- "Easter Day 1935" (Brecht/Eisler)
- "Kein Kriegspielzeug Für Jonathan" (Duo Goebbels/Harth)
- "The Song of Investment Capital Overseas" (Cutler/Frith)
- "The Address"
- "Fragments"
- "On Suicide" (Brecht/Eisler)
- "Und Ich Werde Nicht Mehr Sehen" (Brecht/Eisler)

To prepare the "Berlin Programme" for the Rē Records Quarterly LP release, Cutler and Goebbels edited the East Berlin radio recording with "repeated listening in mind". They were unable to alter the mixes but shortened the recording to 28-minutes, omitting the closing Art Bears song, "Freedom". Cutler remarked that notwithstanding the edits, the LP version "... does, I think, still convey that contradiction we tried to express at the concert: between the distracting and draining pressure of contemporary life ..."

== Members ==
- Tom Cora – cello, bass guitar, cassettes, electrics
- Chris Cutler – drums, electrics
- Fred Frith – guitar, bass guitar, cassettes
- Heiner Goebbels – piano, synthesizer, guitar, cassettes
- Alfred Harth – tenor saxophone, bass clarinet, trumpet, trombone, mouthpieces
- Dagmar Krause – vocals
- George Lewis – trombone, mouthpieces

== Discography ==
- Rē Records Quarterly Vol.1 No.2 (LP, Recommended Rē 0102, UK, 1985)
  - Side 1: "Berlin Programme" (Brecht/Eisler, Cutler/Frith, Duo Goebbels/Harth, Cora, Krause, Lewis) – 27:44

This is the original edit of Duck and Cover's live performance of the "Berlin Programme" at the Berliner Ensemble in East Berlin on 16 February 1984.

=== Re-issues ===
- RēR Quarterly Selections from Vol.1 (CD, Recommended RēR QCD1, UK, 1991)
  - Track 2: "Berlin Programme" (Brecht/Eisler, Cutler/Frith, Duo Goebbels/Harth, Cora, Krause, Lewis) – 27:41

This is a minor edit of the original "Berlin Programme" release on Rē Records Quarterly Vol.1 No.2.

- The Art Box (6xCD, Recommended RēR ABox, UK, 2004)
  - Disc 6, track 2: "The Song of Investment Capital Overseas" (Cutler/Frith) – 3:42

This is an extract from the "Berlin Programme" of the Art Bears song.

== See also ==
- History of Berlin
