= Just Music =

- Origin: Frankfurt/Main, West Germany
- Genres: Experimental, free improvisation
- Years active: 1967–1972
- Labels: ECM, CBS, self production
- Past members: Alfred Harth; Dieter Herrmann; Johannes Krämer; Thomas Stoewsand; Franz Volhard; Peter Stock; Thomas Cremer

Just Music were a German avant-garde music ensemble, an interchangeable collective of classically trained instrumentalists founded at the centrum freier cunst, Frankfurt/Main in 1967 by multi-instrumentalist Alfred Harth. An inherent anti-commercial bias kept them at arm's length from the mainstream music business, enabling them to experiment at will. Just Music changed their name several times depending on the context.

Other names of theirs are New Thing Orchestra, Free Jazz Orkestra Frankfurt, Panta Rei and urKult.

== History ==
Alfred Harth had founded the club H in 1965 and then the meeting point and platform centrum freier cunst in Frankfurt/Main starting with his essay "On Synaesthetics" in 1967 and the vision of synthesizing avant-garde art, avant-garde music and avant-garde literature. It became an open exchange and performance place for young experimental artists, poets and musicians in the Frankfurt area with the Just Music ensemble as a main creative pool. American clarinetist Tony Scott played there with Just Music and also in the following years Harth and Just Music kept open to perform with many others as the German musicians trumpetist and composer Michael Sell (with the Free Jazz Group Wiesbaden), saxophonist Peter Brötzmann and tuba and bassplayer Peter Kowald, Czech flutist Jiri Stivin, members of the AACM, Polish violinist Zbigniew Seifert, American saxophonist Anthony Braxton a.o. In 1969, Just Music recorded the 2nd LP (1002) for Manfred Eicher's label ECM and Thomas Cremer, Harth and Thomas Stöwsand made a joint performance with the Nicole Van den Plas Trio from Belgium at the San Sebastian Jazz Festival in Spain. From then on Just Music also worked in cooperation with members of the Nicole Van den Plas Trio. In 1971 Harth and Van den Plas started to focus on duo works and in 1972 with guests as Peter Kowald and drummer Paul Lovens a.o. in Belgium which later in the same year lead to the foundation of the group E.M.T. when Just Music had performed their last concerts with partly exchanged members in Poland.

== Music ==
Just Music's repertoire included written scores and graphic notation by Alfred Harth in the very beginning and then free improvisation. It incorporated elements of jazz, classical music, fluxus, dada, happening and the avant-garde. Their music was mostly experimental, making classification all but impossible and contained an extreme variety of timbres and dynamics at the basis of a spontaneous expression. Process was more important than a result. Just Music partly incorporated their audiences.

== Concept ==
Since the mid-1960s Alfred Harth was open to all creative horizons influenced by the Stuttgarter Schule around Max Bense, zen and the fluxus events in nearby Wiesbaden. He treated breaking glass, thunder and rain, fireworks or everyday tool's noises as equal synaesthetic manifestations. Harth co-created a toneless wind instrument concept during a studio production at the Hessischer Rundfunk, experimented muting his saxophones with all kinds of stuff even from outside the keys by covering the saxophone with clothes and implemented backward recorded accordion live on cassette. Johannes Krämer was using a wide variety of unorthodox guitar tunings, and preparing guitars with objects like drumsticks and screwdrivers to alter the instruments' timbre. On the other hand, Just Music had formed the political fraction urKult who demonstrated against the "unilateral presentation and consumption of New Music without political implications" before or even during other relevant concert events and by this provoked the ivory tower of the nearby Darmstädter Ferienkurse events as well as music businesses "as instruments of the establishment".

== Name ==
Just Music is almost a German expression. The name was chosen by Alfred Harth to express that there shall be no pressure for anything. Just Music strictly avoided titles for their works and even several times changed their group name.

== Performances (selection) ==
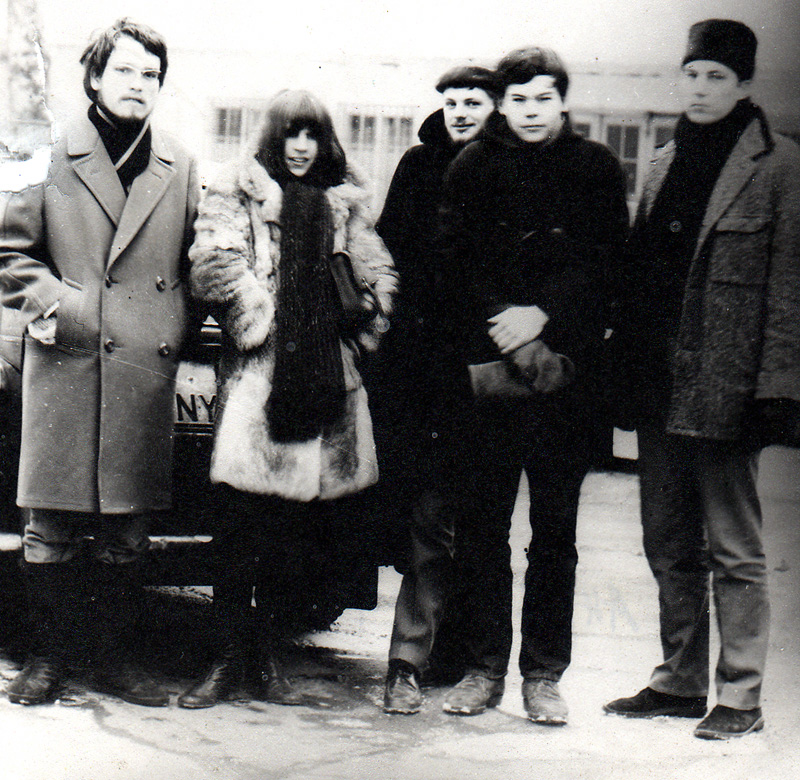
From left to right: Alfred Harth, Nicole Van den Plas, Thomas Cremer, Franz Volhard, Peter Stock in 1970

1967

- at centrum freier cunst in Frankfurt/Main
- at composer Dieter Schnebel's concert series for atonal music in Frankfurt/Main

1968

- at the main cathedral, Dom, in Frankfurt/Main
- TV-Feature with concrete poet Franz Mon in Mainz
- at the Liederhalle, Mozartsaal, Stuttgart, radio recorded by Süddeutscher Rundfunk (SDR)
- concert managed by Siegfried Schmidt-Joos in Düsseldorf
- performs Christian Wolff's "Play" from the Prose Collection at the Theater am Turm, Frankfurt/Main
- studio production at the Frankfurt radio, Hessischer Rundfunk, plus interview with Alfred Harth

1969

- at the Rational Theater in Munich (first concert together with Thomas Stoewsand who then moved to Frankfurt and stayed member until the last concerts in Poland)
- at the Action Center in Munich
- at the Jazzfestival San Sebastian, Spain, in cooperation with the Nicole Van den Plas Trio from Belgium
- at the Stadttheater Bremerhaven

1970

- radio play Alles wie zuvor in cooperation with composer Aleida Montijn produced at the radio Frankfurt/Main, Hessischer Rundfunk
- at the 12th German Jazzfestival in Frankfurt/Main
- at the 12th German Jazzfestival with the European Free Jazz Orchestra (A.Harth, P.Stock) conducted by members of the AACM
- at the Jazzfestival Přerov (with N. Van den Plas, A.De Tiege) and with Jiri Stivin in Prague, Czechoslovakia
- live at the radio Prague, Czechoslovakia
- one month daily at the Theatre Lucernaire, Paris, France (with Eugene Broeckhoven)
- two weeks daily at the theatre festival, Théâtre de la Recherche, in Avignon, France, (with J.Van den Plas)
- at the Jazzfestival Bilzen (Cremer, Harth, Stoewsand), Belgium
- studio production at the Frankfurt radio, Hessischer Rundfunk, with Peter Kowald, Heinz Sauer, Michael Sell, N. Van den Plas a.o.

1971

- in Breda, Netherlands
- at the Belgian Radio, BRT
- at the Jazzfestival Ghent as Panta Rei (with N. and J. Van den Plas), Belgium
- at the Action Center, Munich, session with Anthony Braxton, Cremer, Harth, Stoewsand
- concert in München with Cremer, Manfred Eicher (bass), Harth, Stoewsand, N. Van den Plas
- studio production at the Frankfurt radio, Hessischer Rundfunk, with Peter Brötzmann, N. Van den Plas a.o.
- at the Festival Jazz nad Odra, Wrocław, Poland
- in Kraków with violinist Zbigniew Seifert and at the university Warsaw, Poland, (with Herwig Pöschl)

1972

- at the Palais des Beaux-Arts (Cremer, Harth, N. Van den Plas, Volhard), Brussels, Belgium, recorded for a radio program curated by Fred Van Hove

2009

- revival at the festival ROT in Frankfurt/Main - Just Music skips to ROT from 1969 with Alfred Harth, Johannes Krämer, Nicole Van den Plas, Peter Stock, Witold Teplitz, Franz Volhard, radio recorded by the Hessischer Rundfunk

== Personnel ==
From the left: Nicole Van den Plas, Thomas Cremer, Thomas Stoewsand, Alfred Harth in 1971

- Eugene Broeckhoven (Belgium) - drums
- Thomas Cremer – drums, clarinet, voice
- Andre De Tiege (Belgium) - bass
- Ronnie Dusoir (Belgium) - dr
- Alfred Harth – tenor sax, clarinet, bass clarinet, trumpet, voice, misc.
- Dieter Herrmann – trombone
- Johannes Krämer – guitar, voice
- Herwig Pöschl (Austria) – drums
- Hans Schwindt - clarinet, altosax
- Peter Stock – bass
- Thomas Stoewsand – cello, flutes, voice
- Witold Teplitz – violin, clarinet
- Franz Volhard – cello
- Jean Van den Plas (Belgium) – cello, bass
- Nicole Van den Plas (Belgium) - piano
- Edmond Van Lierde (Belgium) - altosax

== Discography ==
- Just Music (1969) - self-produced LP, 300 items
- Just Music (1969), ECM (cover art)
- Born Free (1970), Scout
- 4.Januar 1970 (1970) - self-produced LP, 300 items
- Four CDRs with archive material from 1968 to 1971 (2009), Just Music, Laubhuette Productions
