= JazzFest Berlin =

Music festival in Germany

Berlin Jazz Festival
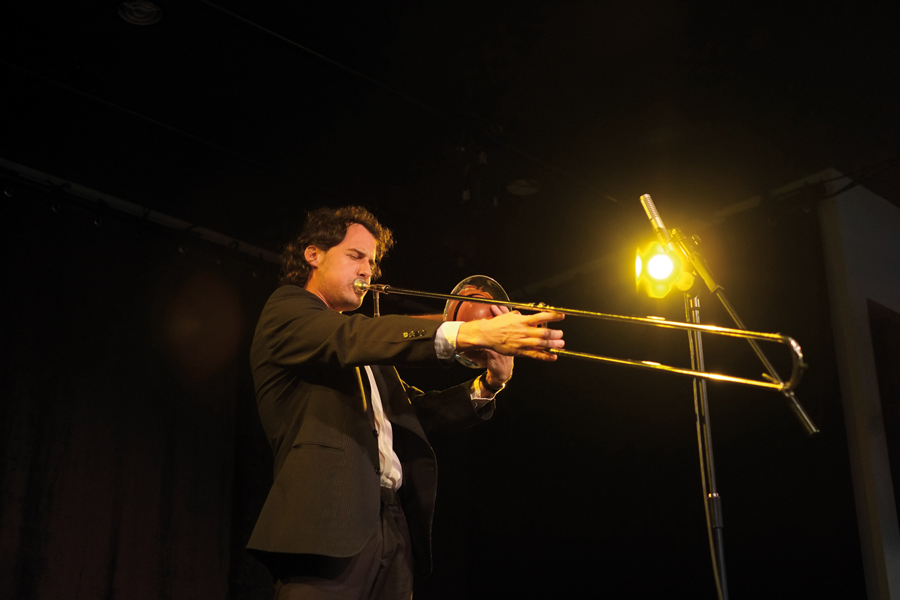
- Nils Wogram, Albert Mangelsdorff Preis winner, 2013
- Genre: Jazz
- Locations: Berlin, Germany
- Coordinates: 52°31′00″N 13°23′20″E
- Years active: 1964–present
- Founders: Berliner Festspiele
- Website: Official site

JazzFest Berlin (also known as the Berlin Jazz Festival) is a jazz festival in Berlin, Germany. Originally called the "Berliner Jazztage" (Berlin Jazz Days), it was founded in 1964 in West Berlin by the Berliner Festspiele. Venues included Berliner Philharmonie, Haus der Kulturen der Welt, Volksbühne, Haus der Berliner Festspiele and the Jazzclubs Quasimodo and A-Trane.

The festival's mission has been "to document, support, and validate trends in jazz, and to mirror the diversity of creative musical activity.

== See also ==
- List of music festivals
- List of jazz festivals
