= Rarities Volumes 1 & 2 =

Compilation album by Lindsay Cooper
- Released: 2014
- Recorded: 1979–1992
- Genre: Avant-garde jazz; experimental music; free improvisation
- Length: 122:34
- Label: RēR Megacorp

Lindsay Cooper chronology
A View from the Bridge (1998)	Rarities Volumes 1 & 2 (2014)

Rarities Volumes 1 & 2 is a 2014 posthumous double-CD compilation album of various pieces by English experimental musician and composer Lindsay Cooper. It was recorded between 1979 and 1992, and released in the UK and US by RēR Megacorp in 2014. The compilation was also released by ReR Megacorp in Japan in 2015.

Rarities was compiled by Udi Koomran and Chris Cutler in Cooper's honour. It comprises unreleased material, and tracks that had previously appeared only on limited edition releases and compilations.

== Background ==
Cooper died of multiple sclerosis in 2013. She had been diagnosed in 1987, but did not reveal her illness until the late-1990s. Three memorial concerts took place for Cooper in November 2014 in London, West Yorkshire, and Forlì, Italy.

== Content ==
The double-CD compilation booklet includes background information by Chris Cutler, and memorials written by Sally Potter, Tim Hodgkinson, David Thomas and Kate Westbrook.

== Reception ==
In a review of Rarities in Musicworks, René van Peer wrote that the compilation "is a fitting memorial to a creative life that was cruelly cut short by a horrific disease." He said the album highlights Cooper's main interests, the empowerment of women, her opposition to the establishment, and "an irrepressible urge to play, to be heard ... with dedication and focus, and with [a] zest for life." A review of the album at Avant Music News described it as "full of treasures". It stated that while Cooper's work with Henry Cow and News from Babel is well documented, much of her other work is generally not that well known. The reviewer said that this compilation fills those holes, and called it "an excellent introduction to the varied career of the sadly missed Cooper."

Writing in the Czech cultural magazine kulturní magazín UNI, Petr Slabý said that the collection of thirty brief pieces on the first disc illustrates Cooper's ability to exploit the short format. He stated that the second disc highlight is the Trio Trabant's Strasbourg concert in which Cooper excels, and called her piano solo on "Piano Roulette", with its variations in tempo and mood, an "unreleased rarity". Overall Slabý was impressed with the compilation, but added that he would have liked to have seen samples of the Feminist Improvising Group and Cooper's collaborative work with Alex Švamberk and Laurie Amat.

In a review in the French webzine, Rythmes Croisés, Stéphane Fougere said that Rarities reveals Cooper's lesser known work, and fills the gaps in her discography. He was particularly impressed by the previously unreleased Trio Trabant concert and Cooper's solo "Piano Roulette", but also would have like to have seen something from the Feminist Improvising Group. Fougere stated that while the material on this compilation is quite diversified, and will appeal to diverse audiences, it should not be seen as a retrospective collection, nor used as an introduction to Cooper's music. He suggested that newcomers start with her solo albums like Rags and The Golddiggers, the Oh Moscow concert, and the two News from Babel albums.

== Tracks ==
All tracks composed by Lindsay Cooper, unless otherwise stated.

=== Disc 1 ===
I. Outtakes for Other Occasions
No.	Title	Writer(s)	Length
1.	"Tsar's Band"		0:44
2.	"The Assassination"		1:33
3.	"The Evening Before"		1:51
4.	"Give Us a Smile: film score"		3:05
5.	"Washing Line"		0:35
6.	"Against the Current: film score"		3:08
7.	"The Time of Their Lives: curtain music"		1:22
8.	"Trih's Song"		1:16

II. The Small Screen: Music for Television
No.	Title	Writer(s)	Length
9.	"The Song of the Goose and the Common"	traditional	1:33
10.	"Off the Fence"	Lindsay Cooper, Lis Rhodes	1:20
11.	"Fair Exchange"	Cooper, Rhodes	1:58
12.	"Windscale"	Cooper, Rhodes	0:46
13.	"The Number 8 Bus"	Cooper, Rhodes	1:23
14.	"Belfast"		2:07
15.	"Fanfare"		0:38
16.	"Flute Tune"	traditional	1:16
17.	"Priesthill"		0:48
18.	"Domestic Bliss: end credits"		2:37
19.	"Court Entry"		0:57
20.	"Lord Wilberforce"		1:01
21.	"Home Movie 1"		1:12
22.	"Open Letters"		2:30
23.	"Linda B"		1:04
24.	"Home Movie 2"		2:50
25.	"Three Heads"		1:14
26.	"Julia: end credits"		3:16

III. Lindsay Cooper and orchestra
No.	Title	Writer(s)	Length
27.	"Extract from Concerto per Sax Sopranino e Archi "		5:07

IV. A Classic Guide to Nomansland
No.	Title	Writer(s)	Length
28.	"In the Archive"		0:40
29.	"Mainz"		1:55
30.	"Paulskirche"		2:22

=== Disc 2 ===
Trio Trabant
No.	Title	Writer(s)	Length
1.	"Le Detroit"	Cooper, Alfred 23 Harth, Phil Minton	6:48
2.	"De Breede en de Smalle Weg"	Cooper, Harth, Minton	4:41
3.	"Le Cadran Bleu 3"	Cooper, Harth, Minton	5:38
4.	"State of Retrograd"	Cooper, Harth, Minton	4:42
5.	"Vigilanz"	Cooper, Harth, Minton	3:46
6.	"Le Cadran Bleu 5"	Cooper, Harth, Minton	8:02

Lindsay Cooper
No.	Title	Writer(s)	Length
7.	"Pictures from the Great Exhibition" "Fingers Weary and Worn" "Canal Towpath" "Musical Box" "Regent Street" "Women's Wrongs" "Cholera Morbus" "The Housewife's Nightmare" "Spitalfields"	Cooper, James Tulley Cooper, Tulley; Cooper, Herold Cooper, Minton; Cooper, Herold Cooper, Tulley	8:06

Cooper/Cutler/Gilonis/Wyatt
No.	Title	Writer(s)	Length
8.	"In the Dark Year"	Cooper, Chris Cutler	3:47

Lindsay Cooper (solo piano)
No.	Title	Writer(s)	Length
9.	"Piano Roulette"		11:25

David Thomas and the Pedestrians
No.	Title	Writer(s)	Length
10.	"Petrified"	Cooper, Cutler, David Thomas	9:49

Bauer/Cooper/Cutler/Gilonis/Potter
No.	Title	Writer(s)	Length
11.	"Education"	Cooper, Cutler	3:41

Source: CD liner notes

== Track notes and personnel ==
=== Disc 1 ===
Assembled and pre-mastered by Udi Koomran at Ginger's Studio, Tel Aviv, Israel.

==== I. Outtakes for Other Occasions ====
- Tracks 1–3 from the 1982 play, The Execution by Melissa Murray
- Track 4 from the 1983 film Give Us a Smile by the Leeds Animation Workshop
- Tracks 5–8 from the 1983 Channel 4 television documentary, Green Flutes, directed by Nancy Scheisari

Originally released as a limited edition cassette to subscribers to Cooper's Music for Other Occasions (1986)

Recorded in London between 1979 and 1984

- Lindsay Cooper – piano, bassoon
- Chris Cutler – drums
- Maggie Nicols – voice
- Irita Kutchmy – flute, saxophone
- Vicky Aspinall – violin
- Georgie Born – cello on "Trih's Song"
- Fred Frith – guitar

==== II. The Small Screen: Music for Television ====
- Tracks 9–13 from Four Corners, for Channel 4
- Tracks 14–17 from the 1983 Channel 4 television documentary, Green Flutes, directed by Nancy Scheisari
- Track 18 from Domestic Bliss, a comedy drama directed by Joey Chamberlain for Channel 4
- Tracks 19–26 from With Our Children, a film about lesbian mothers directed by Melanie Chait for Channel 4

Originally released as a limited subscription cassette in 1984

Recorded in March 1983 (Green Flutes), March and August 1984 (Four Corners), June 1984 (Domestic Bliss), September 1984 (With Our Children). All engineered by Charles Gray.

- Lindsay Cooper – piano, Casio, bassoon, oboe, sopranino and alto saxophones, bass guitar on "Off the Fence" and "Domestic Bliss"
- Georgie Born – guitar and bass guitar on "Green Flutes" and "Domestic Bliss"
- Chris Cutler – drums on "Green Flutes" and "Domestic Bliss"
- Celia Gore Booth – singing saw on "With Our Children"
- Dagmar Krause – singing on "Windscale" and "The Number 8 Bus"
- Irita Kutchmy – piccolo on "Green Flutes"
- Maggie Nicols – singing on "With Our Children"
- Kate Westbrook – singing on "The Song of the Goose and the Common", "Off the Fence" and "Fair Exchange"; tenor horn on "Off the Fence", "Fair Exchange" and "With Our Children"

==== III. Lindsay Cooper and orchestra ====
Originally released on Angelica 1992 (1993), a compilation by Pierrot Lunaire

Recorded at the Angelica festival, Bologna, Italy in May/June 1992

- Lindsay Cooper – soprano saxophone
- Orchestra Del Teatro Comunale Di Bologna
- Franco Sebastiani – conductor

==== IV. A Classic Guide to Nomansland ====
Originally released on the No Man's Land compilation sampler, A Classic Guide To No Man's Land (1988)

Recorded and engineered by Walter Brussow in Frankfurt, Germany, March 1987

Tracks originally written for the films Das Nächste Jahrhundert Wird Unseres Sein and Wir Wollen Lieber Fliegen als Kriechen, directed by Claudia von Allemann for Hessischer Rundfunk television

- Elvira Plenar – synthesizer, piano
- Lindsay Cooper – sopranino and soprano saxophones
- Alfred Harth – bass clarinet
- Ann-Marie Roelofs – violin, trombone

=== Disc 2 ===
Compiled by Chris Cutler and remastered by Bob Drake at Studio Midi-Pyrenees, France.

==== Trio Trabant ====
Previously unreleased recordings by the trio of Lindsay Cooper, Alfred 23 Harth, Phil Minton

Recorded at Festival Musica in Strasbourg, Germany on 4 October 1991; mastered by Harth at Laubhuette Studio, Moonsun, Korea

- Lindsay Cooper – bassoon, sopranino saxophone, electronics
- Alfred 23 Harth – alto and tenor saxophones, clarinet, bass clarinet, trumpet, trombone, piano, synthesizer, Farfisa organ, melodika
- Phil Minton – voice

==== Lindsay Cooper ====
Originally released as a limited edition not-for-sale subscription item with Cooper's LP Rags

Recorded at Kaleidophon Studios, London in April 1979 for the film Song of the Shirt

- Georgie Born – cello, bass guitar
- Phil Minton – trumpet, voice
- Lindsay Cooper – bassoon, saxophone

==== Cooper/Cutler/Gilonis/Wyatt ====
Originally released on The Last Nightingale (1984), released to raise money for the British miners during the 1984–1985 UK miners' strike

Recorded and engineered at Cold Storage in Brixton, London by Gilonis and Tim Hodgkinson, 29–31 October 1984

- Lindsay Cooper – piano, electric piano, sopranino saxophone, bassoon
- Robert Wyatt – voice
- Chris Cutler – drums
- Bill Gilonis – guitar, bass

==== Lindsay Cooper (solo piano) ====
Previously unreleased

Recorded live at Roulette, New York, 13 November 1985

- Lindsay Cooper – piano

==== David Thomas and the Pedestrians ====
Originally released on Winter Comes Home (1983)

Recorded live at the Hirschwirt restaurant in Erding, Germany on 11 December 1982; concert mix by EM Thomas

- David Thomas – voice
- Lindsay Cooper – bassoon, sopranino saxophone
- Chris Cutler – drums

==== Bauer/Cooper/Cutler/Gilonis/Potter ====
Originally released on Volume 1 No. 1 of the RēR Quarterly magazine (1985)

Recorded at Cold Storage in Brixton, London by Gilonis, April 1984

- Lindsay Cooper – piano, alto and soprano saxophone
- Sally Potter – voice
- Chris Cutler – drums
- Connie Bauer – trombone
- Bill Gilonis – guitar, bass

Source: CD liner notes
