= Complete (News from Babel album) =

Box set by News from Babel
- Released: 2006
- Recorded: 1983–1986
- Genre: Avant-rock
- Length: 73:05
- Label: Recommended (UK)
- Producer: News from Babel

News from Babel chronology
Letters Home (1986)	Complete (2006)

Complete is a three-CD box set by the English avant-rock band News from Babel. It contains remastered and repackaged releases of the two News from Babel albums, Work Resumed on the Tower (1984) and Letters Home (1986), plus an illustrated CD of their 7" single, "Contraries" (1984). The first album comprises the two song-suites Sirens and Silences and Work Resumed on the Tower, while the second album contains the Letters Home song-suite. The box set also contains a book of song texts and artwork.

== Disc 1: Work Resumed on the Tower ==
Contains all the tracks from the News from Babel LP, Work Resumed on the Tower (1984).

=== Track list ===
All music is composed by Chris Cutler and Lindsay Cooper

Sirens and Silences
No.	Title	Length
1.	"Odysseus"	2:56
2.	"Auschwitz/Babel"	4:07
3.	"Klein's Bottle"	3:17
4.	"Black Gold"	3:09
5.	"Devils"	1:16
6.	"Dry Leaf"	2:51

Work Resumed on the Tower
No.	Title	Length
1.	"Arcades (of Glass)"	7:44
2.	"Victory"	5:19
3.	"Anno Mirabilis"	4:08

=== Personnel ===
- Lindsay Cooper – bassoon, sopranino and alto saxophone, piano, other keyboards
- Chris Cutler – drums, electrics, percussion
- Zeena Parkins – harp, prepared and electric harps, accordion
- Dagmar Krause – singing

=== Guests ===
- Phil Minton – trumpet ("Victory", "Anno Mirabilis"), singing ("Anno Mirabilis")
- Georgie Born – bass guitar ("Black Gold")

== Disc 2: Letters Home ==
Contains all the tracks from the News from Babel LP, Letters Home (1986).

=== Track list ===
All music is composed by Chris Cutler and Lindsay Cooper

No.	Title	Length
1.	"Who Will Accuse?"	2:38
2.	"Heart of Stone (Megalopolis)"	3:04
3.	"Banknote"	3:19
4.	"Moss"	3:58
5.	"Dragon at the Core"	4:39
6.	"Dark Matter"	4:20
7.	"Waited/Justice"	5:09
8.	"Fast Food"	3:13
9.	"Late Evening"	4:58

=== Personnel ===
- Lindsay Cooper – bassoon, sopranino and alto saxophone, piano, other keyboards
- Chris Cutler – drums, electrics, percussion
- Zeena Parkins – harp, prepared and electric harps, accordion, ebo guitar

=== Guests ===
- Bill Gilonis – bass guitar, guitar
- Robert Wyatt – singing ("Who Will Accuse?", "Heart of Stone", "Moss", "Waited/Justice", "Late Evening")
- Dagmar Krause – singing ("Fast Food", "Late Evening")
- Sally Potter – singing ("Banknote", "Dark Matter")
- Phil Minton – singing ("Dragon at the Core")

== Disc 3: "Contraries" ==
Contains the News from Babel 7" single, "Contraries" (1984).

=== Track list ===
All music is composed by Chris Cutler and Zeena Parkins

No.	Title	Length
1.	"Contraries"	3:00

=== Personnel ===
- Lindsay Cooper – bassoon, piano, horns, marimba
- Chris Cutler – marimba
- Zeena Parkins – harp, accordion
- Dagmar Krause – singing
