= Work Resumed on the Tower =

Studio album by News from Babel
- Released: 1984
- Recorded: 10–19 October 1983, 2–3 November 1983
- Studio: Cold Storage Recording Studios, Brixton, London
- Genre: Avant-rock
- Length: 34:47
- Label: Recommended (UK)
- Producer: News from Babel

News from Babel chronology
Work Resumed on the Tower (1984)	Letters Home (1986)

Professional ratings
Review scores
Source	Rating
AllMusic	3/5 stars

Work Resumed on the Tower (also known as Sirens and Silences/Work Resumed on the Tower) is a 1984 studio album by English avant-rock group News from Babel. It was recorded at Tim Hodgkinson's Cold Storage Recording Studios in Brixton, London, in October and November 1983, and released in 1984. It was their debut album and included guest vocalist Phil Minton. The music on the album was composed by Lindsay Cooper and the song texts were written by Chris Cutler.

The album comprises two song-suites Sirens and Silences and Work Resumed on the Tower, each on one side of the original LP release. The CD releases of the album were entitled Sirens and Silences/Work Resumed on the Tower. For technical reasons, the LP release was pressed on a 12" disc at 45 rpm, and not the standard 33⅓ rpm.

== Background ==
The formation of News from Babel and the creation of this album was inspired by literary critic George Steiner's 1975 book on language and translation, After Babel. Commenting on the group, Chris Cutler said: "I liked the idea of a record as a letter or a newscast from a doomed but hopeful place." The album's title referred to the Tower of Babel. In the booklet accompanying the original LP release, Cutler wrote:

Our first task must be to start work once more on the Tower. If we cannot speak, then we must work in silence – to drawing and diagrams. Where is it to lead? That is what we must discover.

== CD reissues ==
- In 1990 Recommended Records re-issued Work Resumed on the Tower and News from Babel's next album, Letters Home on a single CD.
- In 2006 Recommended Records issued a remastered version of Work Resumed on the Tower on CD.
- In 2006 Recommended Records released a News from Babel box set, Complete comprising remastered versions of Work Resumed on the Tower, Letters Home and the band's only single, "Contraries".

== Track listing ==
All music is composed by Chris Cutler and Lindsay Cooper

Side one – Sirens and Silences
No.	Title	Length
1.	"Odysseus"	2:56
2.	"Auschwitz/Babel"	4:07
3.	"Klein's Bottle"	3:17
4.	"Black Gold"	3:09
5.	"Devils"	1:16
6.	"Dry Leaf"	2:51

Side two – Work Resumed on the Tower
No.	Title	Length
1.	"Arcades (of Glass)"	7:44
2.	"Victory"	5:19
3.	"Anno Mirabilis"	4:08

== Personnel ==
News from Babel

- Lindsay Cooper – bassoon, sopranino and alto saxophone, piano, other keyboards
- Chris Cutler – drums, electrics, percussion
- Zeena Parkins – harp, prepared and electric harps, accordion
- Dagmar Krause – singing

Additional musicians

- Phil Minton – trumpet ("Victory", "Anno Mirabilis"), singing ("Anno Mirabilis")
- Georgie Born – bass guitar ("Black Gold")
