= The Goose and the Common =

18th century social commentary

- by Anonymous
- Written: late 18th century
- Country: England
- Form: quatrain
- Rhyme scheme: AABB
- Publisher: Tickler Magazine.
- Publication date: 1821
- Lines: 16

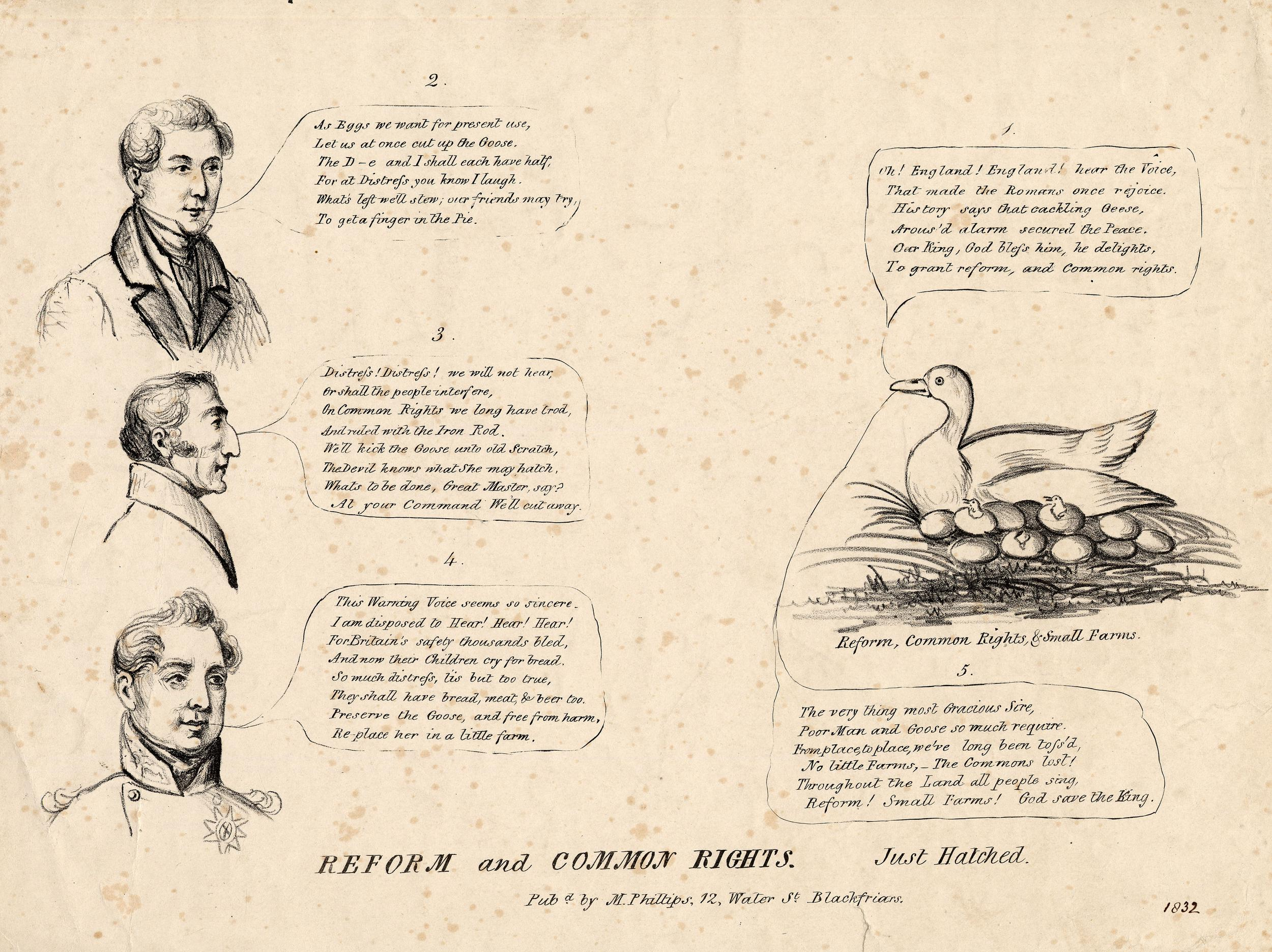
Satirical print from 1830 depicting a goose lamenting the loss of the Commons to Prime Minister Sir Robert Peel, 1st Baronet, a Duke and King William IV.

"The Goose and the Common" (Note: Also referred to as "Stealing the Common from the Goose") is an anonymous English poem which comments on the social injustice caused by the privatization of common land during the enclosures in England.

As an orally transmitted folk poem, it is found in various forms and variations. It is estimated to have been composed in the mid to late 18th century. It is found recorded in magazines as early as 1810, with its first recorded attestation in a 4 stanza form in 1821.

The poem has had an enduring presence in English oral tradition, being often quoted or referenced in discussions and debates around inclosure, including on more than one occasion in the houses of parliament. Today, the poem is often referenced in connection to the privatization of common resources, not just land, such as seed genetics, the human genome and publicly funded research.

The poem consists of pairs of rhyming couplets, sometimes only one stanza.

== Text ==
The 4 stanza version most often quoted:

The law locks up the man or woman
Who steals the goose from off the common
But leaves the greater villain loose
Who steals the common from the goose.

The law demands that we atone
When we take things we do not own
But leaves the lords and ladies fine
Who take things that are yours and mine.

The poor and wretched don’t escape
If they conspire the law to break;
This must be so but they endure
Those who conspire to make the law.

The law locks up the man or woman
Who steals the goose from off the common
And geese will still a common lack
Till they go and steal it back

— Anonymous, "The Goose and the Common"

=== Variations ===
The poem is also often found in a shorter forms, often one stanza only, such as:

A sin it is in man or woman
To steal a goose from off a common;
But he doth sin without excuse
Who steals the common from the goose

Another, which similarly focuses on the comparative morality of the act, rather than degree of punishment:

The crime is great, in man or woman,
Who steals a goose from off a common;
But surely ’tis a worse abuse.
To steal the common from the goose

— found in a letter to the London Express, 1848

One of the earliest recorded attestations in any form, found in The Monthly Magazine, 1810:

A HINT
to the promoters of enclosures.

THE fault is great in man or woman,
Who steals a goose from off a common;
But who can plead that man's excuse,
Who steals the common from the goose?

== Derivative works ==
The posthumously released 2014 compilation album Rarities Volumes 1 & 2 by experimental musician Lindsay Cooper features "The Song of the Goose and the Common" which features lyrics adapted from the poem.

In the 2019 album Enclosure by The Askew Sisters, the poem is sung accompanied by cello and triangle in the track "Goose and Common".

The 2020 music video, "The Goose and the Common", a collaboration between Shadab Shayegan (director, animation) and Heaven Sent Cat (music), has the poem fully included within the lyrics.

In 2023, Helen Bell set the poem to a newly composed melody and added her own new chorus lyric ("Who remembers when...?"), releasing a video in which it is sung by two voices, accompanied by two violas.

The 2025 novel Sunrise on the Reaping by Suzanne Collins, part of The Hunger Games series, sees the character Lenore Dove put the poem to music as she sings about her corrupt and greedy government.

== See also ==
- Omnia sunt communia
- Critical criminology
- Zemiology
