= Live at Taktlos =

Live album by Irène Schweizer
- Released: 1986
- Recorded: February 4 and 5, 1984
- Venue: Taktlos-Festival at Rote Fabrik, Zürich (1988)
- Genre: Jazz
- Label: Intakt Records; 001

Live at Taktlos is a live album by pianist Irène Schweizer. It was recorded in February 1984 during a three-day improvisation meeting, and was released by Intakt Records on LP in 1986, and on CD in 2005. On the album, Schweizer is joined by vocalist Maggie Nicols, trombonist George Lewis, pianist Lindsay Cooper, bassist Joëlle Léandre, and drummers Paul Lovens and Günter Sommer. The album marks the first release by Intakt.

== Reception ==
Professional ratings
Review scores
Source	Rating
The Penguin Guide to Jazz	4/4 stars
Tom Hull – on the Web	B+

The authors of the Penguin Guide to Jazz Recordings awarded the album 4 stars, stating: "As an introduction to [Schweizer's] work, it is hard to beat," and commenting: "Schweizer works brilliantly with drummers... and with Sommer and Lovens... she is at her very best. The association with Maggie Nicols yields a rare mixture of fun and abstract interest and Léandre has also been a very important associate."

Writing for All About Jazz, Derek Taylor remarked: "Attaching a play-by-play to all the delirious, irreverent action and reaction ends up a pointless pursuit within mere minutes. A marker for various partnerships that have since made good on their promises tenfold, this music still packs an enjoyable jolt on par with its initial release."

In an article for Paris Transatlantic, Dan Warburton wrote: "These days, now that the molten lava of free improv has cooled to form a number of well-charted islands, it's even more refreshing to rediscover a music that moves effortlessly between high octane free, Darmstadt pointillism, Cathy Berberian theatrics and even stride and boogie woogie. It's also a timely reminder of how awesome these performers were."

Kurt Gottschalk, writing for Signal to Noise, commented: "Two decades later, it's easy to see this album as a statement of what was then a new form of creative improvising."

== Track listing ==
1. "First Meeting" - 26:10
2. "Lungs And Legs Willing?" - 12:04
3. "Trutznachtigall" - 20:30
4. "Every Now And Then" - 1:21
- Recorded February 4 and 5, 1984 at the Taktlos-Festival, Rote Fabrik, Zürich

== Personnel ==
- Irène Schweizer – piano (tracks 1–3)
- Maggie Nicols – vocals (tracks 2, 4)
- George Lewis – trombone (track 1)
- Lindsay Cooper – piano (track 4)
- Joëlle Léandre – bass (track 3)
- Paul Lovens – drums (track 3)
- Günter Sommer – drums (track 2)

== Production ==
- Peter Pfister – engineer
