= Letters Home (News from Babel album) =

Studio album by News from Babel
- Released: 1986
- Recorded: 1985–1986
- Studio: Cold Storage Recording Studios, Brixton, London
- Genre: Avant-rock
- Length: 35:18
- Label: Recommended (UK)
- Producer: News from Babel

News from Babel chronology
Work Resumed on the Tower (1984)	Letters Home (1986)	Complete (2006)

Professional ratings
Review scores
Source	Rating
AllMusic	4/5 stars

Letters Home is a 1986 studio album by English avant-rock group News from Babel. It was recorded at Tim Hodgkinson's Cold Storage Recording Studios in Brixton, London, in 1985 and 1986, and was released in 1986. It was their second album and included guest vocalists Robert Wyatt, Dagmar Krause, Sally Potter and Phil Minton. Krause (no longer a member of the group) was listed here as a guest and only sang on two songs.

Picking up where Work Resumed on the Tower left off, Letters Home continues News from Babel's exploration of "Marxist politics and personal alienation" set to a blend of rock, jazz and cabaret. The music on the album was composed by Lindsay Cooper and the song texts were written by Chris Cutler. The album's title was named after Letters Home, a collection of letters written by Sylvia Plath.

For technical reasons, the original LP release of this album was pressed on a 12" disc at 45 rpm, and not the standard 33⅓ rpm.

== Track listing ==
All music is composed by Chris Cutler and Lindsay Cooper

Side one
No.	Title	Length
1.	"Who Will Accuse?"	2:38
2.	"Heart of Stone (Megalopolis)"	3:04
3.	"Banknote"	3:19
4.	"Moss"	3:58
5.	"Dragon at the Core"	4:39

Side two
No.	Title	Length
1.	"Dark Matter"	4:20
2.	"Waited/Justice"	5:09
3.	"Fast Food"	3:13
4.	"Late Evening"	4:58

== Personnel ==
- Lindsay Cooper – bassoon, sopranino and alto saxophone, piano, other keyboards
- Chris Cutler – drums, electrics, percussion
- Zeena Parkins – harp, prepared and electric harps, accordion, e-bow guitar

=== Guests ===
- Bill Gilonis – bass guitar, guitar
- Robert Wyatt – singing ("Who Will Accuse?", "Heart of Stone", "Moss", "Waited/Justice", "Late Evening")
- Dagmar Krause – singing ("Fast Food", "Late Evening")
- Sally Potter – singing ("Banknote", "Dark Matter")
- Phil Minton – singing ("Dragon at the Core")

== CD reissues ==
- In 1990 Recommended Records re-issued Letters Home and News from Babel's previous album, Work Resumed on the Tower on a single CD.
- In 2006 Recommended Records issued a remastered version of Letters Home on CD.
- In 2006 Recommended Records released a News from Babel box set, Complete comprising remastered versions of Work Resumed on the Tower, Letters Home and the band's only single, "Contraries".
