= List of songs about the Cold War =

This is a list of songs about the Cold War.

Songs about the Cold War
Title	By	Notes
"1999"	Prince	"Yeah, everybody's got a bomb, We could all die any day", referring to nuclear proliferation
"2 Minutes to Midnight"	Iron Maiden	Refers to the Doomsday Clock, the symbolic clock used by the Bulletin of the Atomic Scientists. In September 1953 the clock reached 23:58, the closest the clock ever got to midnight when the song was written. This occurred when the United States and Soviet Union tested H-bombs within nine months of one another.
"99 Luftballons"	Nena	The song imagines a world where the release of 99 balloons triggers governments to scramble fighter jets to intercept them, ultimately leading to total nuclear annihilation.
"Advice to Joe"	Roy Acuff	A pro-US song, mocking Stalin and bringing up the German invasion of the Soviet Union
"Amerika"	Herbert Grönemeyer	About the influence of the US and its conflict with Russia on German culture during the 1980s.
"Back in the USSR"	the Beatles	Expresses the singer's great happiness on returning home to the USSR from the United States; political observers saw it as pro-Soviet
"Ball of Confusion"	The Temptations	Vietnam protest song, later covered by various artists including Love and Rockets. The cover by Love and Rockets could be interpreted as being in response to the hostilities between the US and USSR during the eighties.
"Balls to the Wall"	Accept	About human rights
"Bay of Pigs"	Civil War	About the Bay of Pigs Invasion.
"Be Not Always"	The Jacksons	1984 song from their Victory LP
"Bonzo Goes to Bitburg"	Ramones	Written in reaction to the visit paid by U.S. president Ronald Reagan to a military cemetery in Bitburg, West Germany, on May 5, 1985
"Born in the USA"	Bruce Springsteen	About the Vietnam War and the mistreatment of Vietnam veterans
"Breathing"	Kate Bush	About a foetus aware of what is going on outside the womb and frightened by nuclear fallout, which implies that the song is set either during a nuclear war scare or a post-apocalyptic birth
"Bullet the Blue Sky"	U2	Originally written about the United States' military intervention during the 1980s in the Salvadoran Civil War
"Burning Heart"	Survivor	Mentions the East versus West conflict, which is reflected by the fight in the boxing ring between Rocky and Ivan Drago in the movie Rocky IV.
"Button Pusher"	The Dubliners	A song about USAF "Missilemen" in underground ICBM bases, who would initiate the actual launch
"Cambodia"	Kim Wilde	main theme is criticism about the US bombing campaign (Operation Menu) on Eastern Cambodia during the Vietnam War.
"Christmas at Ground Zero"	"Weird Al" Yankovic	About the celebration of Christmas in a post-apocalyptic world.
"Crazy Train"	Ozzy Osbourne	The main theme of the song is criticism of the Cold War.
"Cruise Missiles"	Fischer-Z	About cruise missiles being put up in places close to where people live.
"Cult of Personality"	Living Colour	
"Dancing with Tears in My Eyes"	Ultravox	About a couple dancing for the final time, as a nuclear bomb is about to be dropped.
"De Bom"	Doe Maar	Dutch-language song about the threat of nuclear annihilation, as well as about modern day-to-day life.
"Defcon"	Impakt (Dunk Yer Funk Records)	
"Defcon One"	Pop Will Eat Itself	
"Der Blaue Planet"	Karat	About the world being on the brink of nuclear destruction.
"Distant Early Warning"	Rush	
"Dominion/Mother Russia"	The Sisters of Mercy	
"Eighties"	Killing Joke	The song and its music video refer to then-current political leaders.
"Epitaph"	King Crimson	
"Eve of Destruction"	Barry McGuire	The song references then-current social issues, including the Vietnam War, the threat of nuclear war and the American space program.
"Everybody Wants to Rule the World"	Tears for Fears	The song is about the desire humans have for control and power, which was a current topic during the Cold War.
"Everyday Is Like Sunday"	Morrissey	
"Fireworks"	The Tragically Hip	Set in 1972 in Canada and Russia, it references the Canada–USSR hockey series, "crisis in the Kremlin," nationalism, and the "fake Cold War."
"The Fletcher Memorial Home"	Pink Floyd	
"Forever Young"	Alphaville	Refers to the then-current possibility of nuclear annihilation ("Hoping for the best but expecting the worst / are you gonna drop the bomb or not?")
"Fortunate Son"	Creedence Clearwater Revival	Discusses the sons of "fortunate" men in America who avoided the draft to Vietnam thanks to their family's wealth or prestige
"Frühling in Berlin"	Rainhard Fendrich	Mentions barbed wire, minefields, and soldiers enforcing the separation between East and West, while expressing the human yearning across Berlin’s wall.
"Games Without Frontiers"	Peter Gabriel	The song's lyrics are interpreted as a commentary on war and international diplomacy being like children's games.
"God, Country and My Baby"	Johnny Burnette	
"Goodnight Saigon"	Billy Joel	About a soldier reflecting on his time serving in the Vietnam War.
"Good Technology"	Red Guitars	"We've got missiles, can tear the world apart", referring to nuclear weapons
"Great Atomic Power"	Charlie Louvin	Using the fear that nuclear bombs could wipe out the world to invoke repentance
"A Great Day for Freedom"	Pink Floyd	
"A Hard Rain's a-Gonna Fall"	Bob Dylan	The song is widely interpreted as a reference to the Cuban Missile Crisis, even though it was written before that date
"Hello Vietnam"	Johnnie Wright	
"Heresy"	Rush	
"Heroes"	David Bowie	A love song depicting lovers kissing "by the wall"; many songs from Bowie's "Berlin Trilogy" albums invoke themes of the Cold War, as they were recorded in West Berlin.
"Hiroshima"	Wishful Thinking	About the bombing of Hiroshima.
"Holidays in the Sun"	Sex Pistols	
"I Melt with You"	Modern English	About a couple making love during nuclear annihilation.
"I Won't Let the Sun Go Down on Me"	Nik Kershaw	Mentions Cold War-era politicians and politics, especially in regard to nuclear annihilation: "old men in stripey trousers, rule the world with plastic smiles", and: "forefinger on the button, is he blue or is he red?".
"It's a Mistake"	Men at Work	Anti-war song deeming Cold War-era politics 'a mistake'.
"Killer of Giants"	Ozzy Osbourne	
"Land of Confusion"	Genesis	The song satirizes and criticises Cold War-era politics. Its music video contains puppets from Spitting Image satirizing then-current political figures.
"Lawyers, Guns and Money"	Warren Zevon	
"Leningrad"	Billy Joel	About the lives of Billy Joel and a Russian man named Victor, how they both grew up during the Cold War and how they eventually met each other in Leningrad.
"Listen to the Radio (Atmospherics)"	Tom Robinson	An autobiographic song, in which Robinson recalls his life in East Berlin.
"London Calling"	The Clash	Lyrics reflect concern at contemporary world events and the potential for a nuclear apocalypse: "The ice age is coming, the sun's zoomin' in/ Engines stop running, the wheat is growin' thin/ A nuclear error, but I have no fear"
"Morning Dew"	Bonnie Dobson	The song is presented as a dialogue between the last two survivors of a nuclear holocaust.
"Mutually Assured Destruction"	Gillan	
"New Frontier"	Donald Fagen	A young boy falling in love and dreaming of their future, planning "In case the reds decide to push the button down" ignorant of what that really entails.
"New Year's Day"	U2	Lyrics were inspired by the Polish Solidarity movement.
"Nikita"	Elton John	A love song set against the East German border: the singer describes his crush on a beautiful border guard whom he cannot meet because he is not allowed into the country.
"(No More) Fear of Flying"	Gary Brooker	
"Nuku pommiin"	Kojo	The Finnish entry for the 1982 Eurovision Song Contest, which is about the threat of nuclear bombs.
"Oh Moscow"	Lindsay Cooper	
"Ordinary People"	The Box	Canadian pop rock song (1987), drawing contrasts between life in the US and USSR
"Over de muur"	Klein Orkest	Dutch-language song about the differences and parallels between the divided East and West Berlin.
"Party at Ground Zero"	Fishbone	
"Radio Free Europe"	R.E.M.	
"Ready or Not"	Bananarama	About escaping over the Berlin Wall to reunite with a lover
"Red Skies"	The Fixx	
"Red Star Falling"	Saxon	
"Remember Russia"	Fischer-Z	
"Renegade"	Steppenwolf	
"Right Here, Right Now"	Jesus Jones	
"Ronnie – Talk To Russia!"		cover says "Featuring Ronald Reagan and Mikhail Gorbachev"
"Russians"	Sting	about hoping the "Russians love their children too" because that could be the only thing to save them from destruction if the East and West keep provoking each other
"Seconds"	U2	
"Since Yesterday"	Strawberry Switchblade	
"So Long Mom (A Song For World War III)"	Tom Lehrer	
"Sonderzug nach Pankow"	Udo Lindenberg	Protest song to the tune of Chattanooga Choo Choo, about how Lindenberg was denied access to the GDR. In the song, Lindenberg depicts Erich Honecker, then-current leader of the GDR, as someone who secretly enjoys Western music.
"Soviet Snow"	Shona Laing	
"Stand Or Fall"	The Fixx	
"State of the Nation"	Industry	
"Strange Frontier"	Roger Taylor	On the Strange Frontier album; the song was included on the Greenpeace Non-Toxic Video Hits VHS and Laserdisc compilation
"Subterraneans"	David Bowie	
"Talking Cuban Crisis"	Phil Ochs	
"This Cold War With You"	Floyd Tillman	
"The Tide Is Turning"	Roger Waters	
"The "Fish" Cheer/I-Feel-Like-I'm-Fixin'-to-Die Rag"	Country Joe and the Fish	A protest song about the Vietnam War.
"Them and Us"	Don Henley	
"This is Welfare"	The Dutch	About how welfare has led to World War 2 and possibly a nuclear Armageddon in the near future.
"Two Minute Warning"	Depeche Mode	
"Two Suns in the Sunset"	Pink Floyd	
"Two Tribes"	Frankie Goes to Hollywood	The titular 'two tribes' going to war are the West and the East. The music video even depicts a wrestling match between Ronald Reagan and Konstantin Chernenko.
"Vamos a la playa"	Righeira	About a visit to the beach after a nuclear explosion has taken place.
"Viel die maar"	Toontje Lager	Dutch-language song bout a man wishing the nuclear bomb would fall, so his own personal problems would be over as well.
"The Visitors"	ABBA	A protest song against the persecution of political dissidents in the Soviet Union at the time.
"Walking In Your Footsteps"	The Police	A song which compares the extinction of the dinosaurs to that of mankind in the face of a looming nuclear apocalypse.
"The Wall"	Steppenwolf	Celebrates the Fall of the Berlin Wall.
"Washington Bullets"	The Clash	From the Sandinista! album (a reference to the communist rebel group in Nicaragua), the song condemns American anti-communist military activity in Latin America, ending with criticism of other major superpowers during the era.
"War"	The Temptations	A protest song on the futility of war, written in response to the Vietnam War. Later also covered by Edwin Starr and Bruce Springsteen.
"We Didn't Start the Fire"	Billy Joel	A cleverly structured list of historical events of the Cold War period from the 1950s–1980s.
"Weeping Wall"	David Bowie	Described by Bowie as intending to evoke the misery of the Berlin Wall (see the description of "Heroes" above)
"Welterusten meneer de president"	Boudewijn de Groot	Dutch-language protest song about the Vietnam War and Lyndon B. Johnson.
"West of the Wall"	Toni Fisher	About two lovers being separated by the Berlin Wall.
"What are we making weapons for? (Let us begin)"	John Denver and Alexander Gradsky	This song protests against government expenditure in weapons instead of in their citizens. It was the first time an artist from the USSR got together with an artist from the US to sing about this matter.
"When the Wind Blows"	David Bowie	Soundtrack to the film of the same name, about an elderly couple trying to survive after an atomic bomb has been dropped.
"White Train"	Bananarama	About the train that carried nuclear missiles across the US
"Wind of Change"	Scorpions	About the reunification of East and West after the Cold War.
"With God on Our Side"	Bob Dylan	"I've learned to hate the Russians, All through my whole life, If another war comes, It's them we must fight"
"Wooden Ships"	Crosby, Stills, and Nash	Describes two survivors of a nuclear holocaust, one from each side and wondering "Who won?"
"World Destruction"	Time Zone	
"HeavyWeight"	Lesego Rampolokeng & the Kalahari Surfers	OST from the movie: Nelson Mandela:Son of Africa, Father of a Nation. Mango/Island Records.1996.
"Wozu sind Kriege da"	Udo Lindenberg	
"Go West"	Pet Shop Boys	

== See also ==
- List of songs about the Vietnam War
- List of songs about nuclear war
- List of anti-war songs
