= News from Babel =

English avant-rock group

- From left to right: Lindsay Cooper, Dagmar Krause, Chris Cutler (absent Zeena Parkins)

Background information
- Origin: England
- Genres: Experimental rock, avant-prog
- Years active: 1983–1986
- Label: Recommended
- Spinoff of: Henry Cow; Art Bears
- Past members: Lindsay Cooper; Chris Cutler; Dagmar Krause; Zeena Parkins

News from Babel were an English experimental rock band founded in 1983 by Chris Cutler, Lindsay Cooper, Zeena Parkins and Dagmar Krause. They made two studio albums with several guest musicians (including Robert Wyatt) and disbanded in 1986.

== History ==
In the wake of English avant-rock group Henry Cow (1968–1978), Art Bears (1978–1981), a song-oriented group, was formed by three of Henry Cow's members, drummer Chris Cutler, multi-instrumentalist Fred Frith and singer Dagmar Krause. In Art Bears' wake, News from Babel emerged in 1983, comprising Cutler, Krause, Henry Cow woodwind player Lindsay Cooper, and United States harpist Zeena Parkins. It was Parkins's first "rock group" and the first time she had recorded with her harp. This new group followed the song-oriented approach of Art Bears, but with a different musical emphasis. Cooper composed the music and Cutler wrote the song texts.

News from Babel were purely a studio group, and its formation, name and first album were inspired by literary critic George Steiner's 1975 book on language and translation, After Babel. Commenting on the group, Cutler said: "I liked the idea of a record as a letter or a newscast from a doomed but hopeful place." In 1983 they recorded Work Resumed on the Tower, the title referring to the Tower of Babel, with guest vocalist Phil Minton. At the same time they also recorded "Contraries", a Parkins/Cutler composition released as a single with Work Resumed on the Tower subscription editions. In 1986 they made Letters Home, named after the title of one of Sylvia Plath's books. By this stage, Krause had left the group, but she still guested on the album, which also featured guest vocalists Robert Wyatt, Sally Potter and Phil Minton, plus guitarist Bill Gilonis from The Work, who also produced the album.

Cooper's music on both albums is a blend of rock, jazz and cabaret, while Cutler's lyrics are literate, exploring Marxist themes and personal alienation. The group disbanded in 1986 after recording their second album.

The music of News from Babel was played live first time by former members Cutler, Krause and Parkins with Minton and others in A Celebration of Lindsay Cooper November 2014 in two concerts in England and one in Italy.

== Personnel ==
- Lindsay Cooper – keyboards, bassoon, sopranino and alto saxophones, horns, marimba, all musical compositions (except "Contraries")
- Chris Cutler – drums, electrics, percussion, all song texts
- Zeena Parkins – harp, prepared and electric harp, accordion, composer on "Contraries"
- Dagmar Krause – voice (1983–1984)

=== Guest musicians ===
- On Work Resumed on the Tower
  - Phil Minton – trumpet, voice
  - Georgie Born – bass guitar
- On Letters Home
  - Robert Wyatt – voice
  - Dagmar Krause – voice
  - Sally Potter – voice
  - Phil Minton – voice
  - Bill Gilonis – guitar, bass guitar

== Discography ==
=== Albums ===
- Work Resumed on the Tower (1984, LP, Recommended Records, UK)
- Letters Home (1986, LP, Recommended Records, UK)

For technical reasons, the original LP releases of both albums were pressed on 12" discs at 45 rpm, and not the standard 33⅓ rpm.

In 1990, Recommended Records re-issued Work Resumed on the Tower and Letters Home on a single CD. In 2006, Recommended Records issued re-mastered and repackaged editions of Work Resumed on the Tower and Letters Home, each on their own CD.

=== Singles ===
- "Contraries" (1984, single-sided 7", Recommended Records, UK)

"Contraries" was originally only issued with the subscription edition of the LP Work Resumed on the Tower; later it was sold separately.

=== Boxed sets ===
- Complete (2006, 3×CD, Recommended Records, UK)

Complete comprises the re-mastered and repackaged editions of Work Resumed on the Tower and Letters Home on two CDs, and an illustrated CD of the 7” single "Contraries".
