= Western Culture (album) =

Studio album by Henry Cow
- Released: September 1979
- Recorded: January; 27 July – 8 August 1978
- Studios: Sunrise, Kirchberg, Switzerland
- Genre: Avant-prog
- Length: 36:27
- Labels: Broadcast (UK); Celluloid (France)
- Producers: Henry Cow, Etienne Conod

Henry Cow chronology
Concerts (1976)	Western Culture (1979)	The Virgin Years – Souvenir Box (1991)

Western Culture is a studio album by English avant-rock group Henry Cow, recorded at Sunrise Studios in Kirchberg, Switzerland in January and July–August 1978. It was their last album and was released on Henry Cow's own private label, Broadcast, in September 1979. Later editions appeared on Interzone in the US and Celluloid in France. Only the UK Broadcast pressing used the custom label artwork design.

== Background ==
Western Culture is an instrumental album which came about as a result of disagreements in the band as to what the composition of their next album should be. Recording had already begun at Sunrise Studios in January 1978 and some members were not happy about the predominance of song-oriented material. As a compromise it was agreed that two albums would be made: one of "songs" (released soon after as Hopes and Fears under the name of a new group Art Bears) and one of purely instrumental compositions. The group returned to Sunrise Studios in July that year to record the instrumental pieces for Western Culture, except "½ the Sky", which had been recorded during the January sessions.

Henry Cow split up shortly after recording this album.

== Recording ==
The Lindsay Cooper composition "½ the Sky" was named for Chairman Mao's dictum "Women hold up half the sky". "Viva Pa Ubu" (an outtake from the January recording sessions) was written by Tim Hodgkinson as the start of a musical production of Alfred Jarry's play Ubu Roi (Pa Ubu being a character in the play). "Viva Pa Ubu" includes singing by the whole group, making the CD reissue no longer an instrumental. "Viva Pa Ubu" and "Slice" (an outtake from the July–August recording sessions) had been previously released on the Recommended Records Sampler (1982).

During the recording sessions in July and August 1978, Henry Cow also recorded "Waking Against Sleep", a Fred Frith composition. This 2-minute piece had previously been performed live by the band under the title "The Herring People", and appeared in Volume 9: Late of The 40th Anniversary Henry Cow Box Set (2009). It was later recorded by Curlew under the title "Time and a Half", and appeared on their album, North America (1985), which was produced by Frith. "Waking Against Sleep" was never released by Henry Cow, but appeared on the 1990 CD re-issue of Frith's solo album, Gravity.

== Cover art ==
The album cover art work was done by Chris Cutler. Henry Cow had originally asked cartoonist Don Martin to produce a cover, but he declined. Martin, best known for his work for MAD magazine, had designed several album covers, including The Art Farmer Septet and Sonny Stitt/Bud Powell/J. J. Johnson. Ray Smith, whose painted socks featured on three of Henry Cow's albums, also designed a cover for Western Culture illustrating an industrial city viewed from above with the text "Henry Cow" appearing in its streets. Smith's cover was not used.

== Critical reception ==
Professional ratings
Review scores
Source	Rating
AllMusic	4/5 stars
Christgau's Record Guide	A−
Pitchfork	8.0/10
Spin Alternative Record Guide	9/10
Tom Hull – on the Web	B+

The Valley Advocate praised the "astounding, singular brilliance of Chris Cutler's polyrhythmic crosscurrents and Frith's guitar (and bass) stylings."

== CD reissues ==
Western Culture was reissued on CD by Broadcast in 1988 and East Side Digital Records in 1995. It was reissued again on Recommended Records in 2001 and East Side Digital in 2002 with three bonus tracks, "Viva Pa Ubu", "Slice" and "Look Back (alt)", new liner notes and photographs. The bonus tracks are listed in the wrong order in the booklet. "Viva Pa Ubu", "Slice" and "Look Back (alt)" were later reissued on the 2019 Henry Cow Box Redux: The Complete Henry Cow bonus CD, Ex Box – Collected Fragments 1971–1978.

== Track listing ==
Recorded at Sunrise Studio, Kirchberg, Switzerland on the dates indicated.

Side one – History and Prospects
No.	Title	Writer(s)	Recorded	Length
1.	"Industry"	Tim Hodgkinson	26 July – 8 August 1978	6:58
2.	"The Decay of Cities"	Hodgkinson	26 July – 8 August 1978	6:55
3.	"On the Raft"	Hodgkinson	26 July – 8 August 1978	4:01

Side two – Day by Day
No.	Title	Writer(s)	Recorded	Length
4.	"Falling Away"	Lindsay Cooper	26 July – 8 August 1978	7:38
5.	"Gretels Tale"	Cooper	26 July – 8 August 1978	3:58
6.	"Look Back"	Cooper	26 July – 8 August 1978	1:19
7.	"½ the Sky"	Cooper, Hodgkinson	15–29 January 1978	5:14

2001 and 2002 CD re-issue bonus tracks
No.	Title	Writer(s)	Recorded	Length
8.	Untitled (silence only)			1:29
9.	"Viva Pa Ubu"	Hodgkinson	15–29 January 1978	4:28
10.	"Look Back (alt)"	Cooper	26 July – 8 August 1978	1:21
11.	"Slice"	Cooper	26 July – 8 August 1978	0:36

== Personnel ==
Henry Cow

- Tim Hodgkinson – Farfisa organ, clarinet, alto saxophone, Hawaiian guitar, piano (“On the Raft”), vocals ("Viva Pa Ubu")
- Lindsay Cooper – bassoon, oboe, soprano saxophone, sopranino recorders, vocals ("Viva Pa Ubu")
- Fred Frith – electric & acoustic guitars, bass guitar, soprano saxophone (background "On the Raft"), vocals ("Viva Pa Ubu")
- Chris Cutler – drums, electric drums, noise, piano (“Falling Away”), trumpet (background "On the Raft"), vocals ("Viva Pa Ubu")

Additional musicians

- Annemarie Roelofs (July–August 1978 sessions only) – trombone, violin
- Irène Schweizer – piano ("Gretels Tale")
- Georgie Born – bass guitar ("½ the Sky", "Viva Pa Ubu"), vocals ("Viva Pa Ubu")
- Dagmar Krause – vocals ("Viva Pa Ubu")

Production

- Henry Cow – producers
- Etienne Conod – producer
- Chris Cutler – cover art

== See also ==
- Henry Cow Box (2006)

== Works cited ==
- Cutler, Chris, ed. (2009). "The Road: Volumes 6–10". The 40th Anniversary Henry Cow Box Set (box set booklet). Henry Cow. London: Recommended Records.
- Piekut, Benjamin (2019). Henry Cow: The World Is a Problem. Duke University Press. ISBN 978-1-47800-405-9.
