= Tank Battles =

Studio album by Dagmar Krause
- Released: 1988
- Genre: Cabaret, jazz, avant-garde
- Length: 58:20
- Label: Antilles New Directions
- Producer: Greg Cohen

Dagmar Krause chronology
Supply and Demand (1986)	Tank Battles (1988)	Voiceprint Radio Sessions (1993)

Tank Battles: The Songs of Hanns Eisler is a solo album by German singer Dagmar Krause released by Antilles New Directions on LP and CD in 1988. It is a collection of 22 songs (LP release) and 26 songs (CD release) by German composer Hanns Eisler and sung by Krause in English. She also sang the songs in the original German which were simultaneously released by Antilles on a companion album, Panzerschlacht: Die Lieder von Hanns Eisler on LP and CD.

Tank Battles was reissued by Voiceprint Records in 1994 with all its original tracks from Tank Battles, plus ten bonus tracks taken from the German edition, Panzerschlacht.

== Reception ==
Professional ratings
Review scores
Source	Rating
AllMusic	4/5 stars

In a review of Tank Battles at AllMusic, John Dougan called it "[a] worthy follow up" to Krause's previous album, Supply and Demand. He said her vocals here are "stunning" and the instrumental backing is "impeccable".

Writing in The Wire, Philip Clark called Tank Battles a "laudable attempt" by Krause to present a modern interpretation of songs by Eisler-Brecht. He said producer Greg Cohen's "sensitive arrangements" of the album's material "winningly evokes 1920s Berlin". Clark stated that Krause's "vocal production, the shaping of her melodic contours and the brittle, staccato phrasing" all owes itself to Eisler's work.

== Legacy ==
The album was included in the book 1001 Albums You Must Hear Before You Die.

== Track listing ==
=== Tank Battles: The Songs Of Hanns Eisler (Antilles, LP, 1988) ===
All titles composed by Hanns Eisler. All texts written by Bertolt Brecht, except where stated.

Side A
No.	Title	Writer(s)	Translator(s)	Length
1.	"Song of the Whitewash"		N. Gould-Verschoyle	1:58
2.	"(I Read About) Tank Battles"		John Willett	1:24
3.	"You Have to Pay"	Walter Mehring	Jim Woodland, Malcolm Green	1:37
4.	"Chanson Allemande"	Berthold Viertel	Andrew Dodge	1:13
5.	"Ballad of the Sackslingers"	Julian Arendt	Dagmar Krause, Woodland	3:16
6.	"Mother Beimlein"		Lesley Lendrum	1:11
7.	"The Perhaps Song"		Bettina Jonic, Katherine Helm	1:44
8.	"The Rat Men – Nightmare"	Hanns Eisler		1:11
9.	"Mankind"	Eisler	Krause, Woodland	0:54
10.	"Bettellied"			1:21
11.	"Song of a German Mother"		Eric Bentley	2:26
12.	"Change the World – It Needs It"		Bentley	1:59

Side B
No.	Title	Writer(s)	Translator(s)	Length
1.	"Bankenlied"	Siegmar Mehring		2:52
2.	"Failure in Loving"	Heinrich Heine	Bentley	1:02
3.	"Und Endlich Stirbt"	Peter Altenberg		1:07
4.	"Ballad of (Bourgeois) Welfare"	Kurt Tucholsky	Woodland	2:45
5.	"Mother's Hands"	Tucholsky	Green	1:55
6.	"Berlin 1919"	Anonymous	Bentley	2:24
7.	"Genevieve: Ostern Ist ein Ball Sur Seine"			1:00
8.	"The Homecoming"		Bentley	1:26
9.	"The Trenches"	Tucholsky		3:33
10.	"To a Little Radio"			1:00

Bonus tracks on 1988 CD release
No.	Title	Writer(s)	Translator{s}	Length
1.	"Ballade von der Belebenden Wirkung des Geldes"			4:22
2.	"Legende von der Entstehung des Buches Taoteking"			6:31
3.	"And I Shall Never See Again"		Bentley	1:48
4.	"The Wise Woman and the Soldier"		Bentley	3:33

=== Panzerschlacht: Die Lieder von Hanns Eisler (Antilles, LP, 1988) ===
All titles composed by Hanns Eisler. All texts written by Bertolt Brecht, except where stated.

Side A
No.	Title	Writer(s)	Translator(s)	Length
1.	"Lied von der Tünche"			1:58
2.	"Panzerschlacht"			1:24
3.	"Zahlen Müsst Ihr"	Mehring		1:37
4.	"Chanson Allemande"	Viertel		1:13
5.	"Ballade von den Säckeschmeißern"	Arendt		3:16
6.	"Mutter Beimlein"			1:11
7.	"Das 'Vielleicht' Lied"			1:44
8.	"The Rat Men – Nightmare"	Eisler		1:11
9.	"Der Mensch"	Eisler		0:54
10.	"Bettellied"			1:21
11.	"Lied Einer Deutschen Mutter"			2:26
12.	"Ändere die Welt – Sie Braucht Es"			1:59

Side B
No.	Title	Writer(s)	Translator(s)	Length
1.	"Bankenlied"	Mehring		2:52
2.	"Verfehlte Liebe"	Heine		1:02
3.	"Und Endlich Stirbt"	Altenberg		1:07
4.	"(Ballade von der) Wohltätigkeit"	Tucholsky		2:45
5.	"Mutterns Hände"	Tucholsky		1:55
6.	"Spartakus 1919"	Anonymous		2:24
7.	"Geneviève: Ostern Ist ein Ball Sur Seine"			1:00
8.	"Die Heimkehr"			1:26
9.	"Der Graben"	Tucholsky		3:33
10.	"An den Kleinen Radioapparat"			1:00

Bonus tracks on 1988 CD release
No.	Title	Writer(s)	Translator(s)	Length
1.	"Lied von der Belebenden Wirkung des Geldes"			4:22
2.	"Legende von der Entstehung des Buches Taoteking"			6:31
3.	"Und Ich Werde Nicht Mehr Sehen"			1:48
4.	"Ballade von Weib Und dem Soldaten"			3:33

=== Tank Battles: The Songs Of Hanns Eisler (Voiceprint, CD, 1994) ===
All titles composed by Hanns Eisler. All texts written by Bertolt Brecht, except where stated.

No.	Title	Writer(s)	Translator(s)	Length
1.	"Song of the Whitewash"		Gould-Verschoyle	2:07
2.	"(I Read About) Tank Battles"		Willett	1:30
3.	"You Have to Pay"	Mehring	Woodland, Green	1:43
4.	"Chanson Allemande"	Viertel	Dodge	1:20
5.	"Ballad of the Sackslingers"	Arendt	Krause, Woodland	3:24
6.	"Mother Beimlein"		Lendrum	1:16
7.	"The Perhaps Song"		Jonic, Helm	1:50
8.	"Lied von der Belebenden Wirkung des Geldes"			4:32
9.	"Mankind"	Eisler	Krause, Woodland	0:59
10.	"Bettellied"			1:27
11.	"Song of a German Mother"		Bentley	2:31
12.	"Change the World – It Needs It"		Bentley	2:07
13.	"Bankenlied – Banking Song"	Mehring		2:59
14.	"Legende von der Entstehung des Buches Taoteking"			6:43
15.	"Ballad of (Bourgeois) Welfare"	Tucholsky	Woodland	2:53
16.	"Mother's Hands"	Tucholsky	Green	2:02
17.	"Berlin 1919"	Anonymous	Bentley	2:30
18.	"And I Shall Never See Again"		Bentley	1:52
19.	"Genevieve: Ostern Ist ein Ball Sur Seine"			1:05
20.	"The Wise Woman and the Soldier"		Bentley	3:43
21.	"Failure in Loving"	Heine	Bentley	1:04
22.	"Und Endlich Stirbt"	Altenberg		1:11
23.	"The Rat Men – Nightmare"	Eisler		1:18
24.	"The Homecoming"		Bentley	1:34
25.	"The Trenches"	Tucholsky		3:44
26.	"To a Little Radio"			1:05
27.	"Panzerschlacht"			1:33
28.	"Das 'Vielleicht' Lied"			1:51
29.	"Der Mensch"	Eisler		0:55
30.	"Lied von der Deutschen Mutter"			2:32
31.	"Mutterns Hände"	Tucholsky		2:03
32.	"Spartakus 1919"	Anonymous		2:31
33.	"Und Ich Werde Nicht Mehr Sehen"			1:53
34.	"Die Heimkehr"			1:35
35.	"Der Graben"	Tucholsky		3:43
36.	"An den Kleinen Radioapparat"			1:06

== Personnel ==
- Dagmar Krause – vocals
- Alexander Bălănescu – viola
- Steve Berry – double bass
- Michael Blair – percussion
- Lindsay Cooper – bassoon
- Andrew Dodge – keyboards
- Phil Edwards – saxophone
- John Harle – saxophone
- Sarah Homer – clarinet
- John Leonard – bassoon
- Ian Mitchell – clarinet
- Bruce Nockles – trumpet
- Ashley Slater – tuba
- Steve Sterling – horns
- Graeme Taylor – guitar, banjo
- Gertrude Thoma – vocals
- Danny Thompson – double bass
- John Tilbury – keyboards
