= Supply and Demand (Dagmar Krause album) =

Studio album by Dagmar Krause
- Released: 1986
- Recorded: West 3 and Livingston Studios, London, England
- Genres: Cabaret, jazz, avant-garde
- Length: 42:32
- Label: Hannibal
- Producer: Joe Boyd

Dagmar Krause chronology
Supply and Demand (1986)	Tank Battles (1988)

Supply and Demand: Songs by Brecht / Weill & Eisler is the first solo album by German singer Dagmar Krause released by Hannibal Records in 1986. It is a collection of 16 songs by German composers Kurt Weill and Hanns Eisler, with lyrics by Bertolt Brecht and sung by Krause in English. She also sang the songs in the original German which were released by Hannibal at the same time on a companion album, Angebot & Nachfrage: Lieder von Brecht / Weill & Eisler.

Supply and Demand was reissued by Voiceprint Records in 1999 with track selections from both the English and German editions.

== Reception ==
Professional ratings
Review scores
Source	Rating
AllMusic	4.5/5 stars

In a review of Supply and Demand at AllMusic, John Dougan described the album as an "amazing solo recording". He said it is "approachable, accessible ... beautifully sung ... and very, very moving." Dougan added that "the stunning vocal ability of Dagmar Krause will transport you."

== Track listings ==
=== Supply and Demand ===
1. "Supply & Demand (The Trader's Song)" (Brecht, Eisler) – 2:57
2. "Epitaph 1919" (Brecht, Weill) – 1:59
3. "German Miserere" (Brecht, Eisler) – 1:39
4. "O Falladah, Die du Hangest!" (Brecht, Eisler) – 2:41
5. "Alabama Song" (Brecht, Weill) – 2:51
6. "Hollywood Elegies" (Brecht, Eisler) – 2:55
  - "This City Has Made Me Realise"
  - "You Find Gold"
  - "I Saw Many Friends"
7. "Surabaya Johnny" (Brecht, Weill) – 3:59
8. "Moritat (Ballade von Mackie Messer)" (Brecht, Weill) – 2:39
9. "Matrosen-Tango" (Brecht, Weill) – 3:57
10. "Lily of Hell" (Brecht, Weill) – 2:25
11. "Song of the Moldau" (Brecht, Eisler) – 1:40
12. "Pavel's Prison Song" (Brecht, Eisler) – 3:00
13. "Easter Sunday 1935" (Brecht, Eisler) – 1:24
14. "At Potsdam 'Unter den Eichen'" (Brecht, Weill) – 2:22
15. "Der Song von Mandelay" (Brecht, Weill) – 2:12
16. "Benares Song" (Brecht, Weill) – 3:52

=== Angebot & Nachfrage ===
1. "Angebot & Nachfrage (Song von der Ware)" (Brecht, Eisler) – 2:57
2. "Grabrede 1919" (Brecht, Weill) – 1:59
3. "Deutsche Miserere" (Brecht, Eisler) – 1:39
4. "O Falladah, Die du Hangest!" (Brecht, Eisler) – 2:41
5. "Alabama-Song" (Brecht, Weill) – 2:51
6. "Hollywood-Elegien" (Brecht, Eisler) – 2:55
7. "Surabaya Johnny" (Brecht, Weill) – 3:59
8. "Moritat (Ballade von Mackie Messer)" (Brecht, Weill) – 2:39
9. "Matrosen-Tango" (Brecht, Weill) – 3:57
10. "Die Ballade von der Höllenlili" (Brecht, Weill) – 2:25
11. "Das Lied von der Moldau" (Brecht, Eisler) – 1:40
12. "Im Gefängnis Zu Singen" (Brecht, Eisler) – 3:00
13. "Ostersonntag 1935" (Brecht, Eisler) – 1:24
14. "Zu Potsdam Unter den Eichen" (Brecht, Weill) – 2:22
15. "Der Song Von Mandelay" (Brecht, Weill) – 2:12
16. "Benares Song" (Brecht, Weill) – 3:52

=== Supply and Demand (reissue) ===
1. "Song von der Ware (Supply & Demand)" (Brecht, Eisler) – 2:57
2. "Grabrede 1919 (Epitaph 1919)" (Brecht, Weill) – 1:59
3. "Deutsche Miserere (German Miserere)" (Brecht, Eisler) – 1:39
4. "O Faladah, Die du Hangest!" (Brecht, Eisler) – 2:41
5. "Alabama Song" (Brecht, Weill) – 2:51
6. "Hollywood Elegies" (Brecht, Eisler) – 2:56
  - "This City Has Made Me Realise"
  - "You Find Gold"
  - "I Saw Many Friends"
7. "Surabaya Johnny" (Brecht, Weill) – 3:59
8. "Moritat (Ballade Von Mackie Messer)" (Brecht, Weill) – 2:39
9. "Barbara Song" (Brecht, Weill) – 4:02
10. "Kannonensong (Cannon Song)" (Brecht, Weill) – 2:15
11. "Matrosen-Tango" (Brecht, Weill) – 3:57
12. "Die Ballade von der Höllenlili (Lily of Hell)" (Brecht, Weill) – 2:25
13. "Das Lied von der Moldau (Song of the Moldau)" (Brecht, Eisler) – 1:40
14. "Im Gefängnis Zu Singen" (Brecht, Eisler) – 3:00
15. "Ostersonntag 1935 (Easter Sunday 1935)" (Brecht, Eisler) – 1:24
16. "Zu Potsdam Unter den Eichen (At Potsdam 'Unter den Eichen')" (Brecht, Weill) – 2:22
17. "Der Song von Mandelay (Mandelay Song)" (Brecht, Weill) – 2:12
18. "Benares-Song" (Brecht, Weill) – 3:52
19. "Supply & Demand" (Brecht, Eisler) – 2:57
20. "Epitaph 1919" (Brecht, Weill) – 1:59
21. "German Miserere" (Brecht, Eisler) – 1:39
22. "Surabaya Johnny" (Brecht, Weill) – 3:59
23. "The Song of the Moldau" (Brecht, Eisler) – 1:40
24. "Pavel's Prison Song" (Brecht, Eisler) – 3:00
25. "Easter Sunday 1935" (Brecht, Eisler) – 1:24
26. "At Potsdam 'Unter den Eichen'" (Brecht, Weill) – 2:22

== Personnel ==
- Dagmar Krause – vocals
- Jack Emblow – accordion
- Richard Thompson – acoustic guitar, guitar, banjo
- Danny Thompson – bass guitar
- David Newby – cello
- Joe Gallivan – percussion
- Jason Osborn – piano
- John Harle – alto and soprano saxophone, clarinet, bass clarinet
- Andy Findon – alto, tenor and soprano saxophone, clarinet
- Paul 'Wix' Wickens – synthesizer
- Roger Williams – trombone, tuba
- Howard Evans – trumpet
- Adrian Levine – violin
