= A Doughnut in Both Hands =

Live album by Phil Minton
- Released: 1981
- Recorded: 1975–1982
- Venue: various
- Genre: Free improvisation
- Labels: Rift; 3 Emanem; 4025

A Doughnut in Both Hands is a live album by British vocalist Phil Minton. His first solo album, it was recorded during 1975–1982 at various locations, and was initially released on LP in 1981 by Rift Records. In 1998, Emanem Records reissued the album on CD with six extra tracks.

A Doughnut in Both Hands is the first in a group of four albums the titles of which refer to doughnuts. A Doughnut in One Hand was released in 1998, and was followed by No Doughnuts in Hand (2008) and A Doughnut's End (2015). According to vocalist and writer Chris Tonelli, "the importance of this series cannot be overstated, for these four records, by confusing and complicating entrenched notions of what vocal sounds are ugly and what are beautiful, challenge a pervasive order of the valuable and valueless."

When asked about the emotional content of his music, Minton replied: "there are so many sort of subjective associations with vocal sounds... I've just got to listen to them in an abstract way... I'm just hearing it just as sound and music, actually. I have to disassociate myself from any of the emotional associations."

== Reception ==
Professional ratings
Review scores
Source	Rating
AllMusic	3/5 stars
The Penguin Guide to Jazz	3.5/4 stars

The authors of The Penguin Guide to Jazz Recordings described Minton as "a stunning vocal improvisor, with a tonal and timbral range that seems quite uncanny," and wrote: "'Cenotaph' and 'Wreath' are only three quarters of a minute apiece, but overflowing with pain and pride, anger and redemption," while "'Notes on Avarice' and 'Blasphemy' demand frequent recourse to the repeat button."

Writing for All About Jazz, Glenn Astarita stated: "A Doughnut in Both Hands is not for everyone and will rarely enjoy any long-term exposure via radio airplay; however, the conceptual approach is unique and perhaps revolutionary... You will hear traces of operatic librettos, yodeling, garbled speech, screeching, folksy humor and just about anything he can envision supplemented by an astonishing set of vocal chords. Phil Minton documents the history of anything and everything that can be produced by the human voice." In a separate AAJ review, Robert Spencer commented: "Some of it is wrenching to hear; it sounds like a man in pain. Some of it is funny. There is no denying Minton's audacity or inventiveness. How lasting all this will be remains to be seen, but he is certainly exploring territory that will be further explored by others. A jarring, unique disc."

In a review for AllMusic, François Couture noted that the album "was one of the most influential contributions to free singing or, as Paul Dutton calls it, sound singing."

Richard Cochrane of Metropolis wrote: "Minton's techniques are too many and various to categorise. There's everything here from overtone singing of the most exotic kinds right through yodelling to childish or animalistic noises... Some of these effects are funny, some frightening, but all are very musical."

Musician David Moss stated that his first exposure to Minton's music was via A Doughnut in Both Hands. He recalled thinking "this guy can do things I've just barely been scratching at and didn't know how deep and far you could go." He reflected: "It was shocking. Almost too shocking."

== Track listing ==
All music by Phil Minton. Text on tracks 20 and 21 by Lou Glandfield.

1. "Orders for the Pals" – 4:40
2. "I Fought" – 1:53
3. "Wreath" – 0:48
4. "Cenotaph" – 0:45
5. "The Two Lies" – 2:09
6. "Notes on Avarice" – 5:38
7. "Burnt Memoirs" – 2:22
8. "Wood Song One" – 2:34
9. "Wood Song Two" – 2:57
10. "Wood Song Three" – 2:41
11. "Wood Song Four" – 2:12
12. "Too Many Doughnuts Make You Ill" – 1:37
13. "True Story" – 4:05
14. "Wood Song Five" – 1:55
15. "To Emma Goldman" – 0:44

== Additional tracks on 1998 CD reissue ==
16. "Extra" – 1:21
17. "Blasphemy" – 3:21
18. "Well" – 1:52
19. "A Good Song" – 2:00
20. "Psalm of Evolution 1" – 4:47
21. "Psalm of Evolution 2" – 4:18
- Tracks 1–7 and 18, 20–21 were recorded in 1980 in London. Tracks 8–16 were recorded in Bracknell on August 15, 1975. Track 17 was recorded on November 22, 1981, in Bresse sur Gromes. Track 19 was recorded in 1982 in London.

== Personnel ==
- Phil Minton – voice
