= Annemarie Roelofs =

Dutch musician and academic (born 1955)

- Born: 1955 (age 70–71); Amstelveen, Netherlands
- Genres: Jazz, experimental
- Occupation: Musician
- Instruments: Trombone, violin, tuba

Annemarie Roelofs (born 1955) is a Dutch trombone player, violinist, and professor at the Frankfurt University of Music and Performing Arts. She was a member of Henry Cow and the Feminist Improvising Group.

== Biography ==
Roelofs studied violin at the Amsterdam Conservatory, and played trombone as a secondary instrument. She also enrolled in a course on free improvisation at the Conservatory and began improvising on trombone in salsa bands. In December 1977 Roelofs, unplanned and unannounced, played her trombone with Henry Cow at a concert at a club in Amsterdam. (Note: Roelofs had gone to the Melkweg club to meet a friend, unaware that Henry Cow would be performing, and when some of the horn players in the band began playing from the audience, Roelofs joined in with her trombone. Henry Cow invited her play with them on stage.) Impressed with her improvising, they invited her to join the band. She toured with them briefly, but only became a member in July 1978 because of her studies at the Conservatory. Roelofs featured on Henry Cow's last album, Western Culture, recorded in July and August 1978.

Roelofs played in the Feminist Improvising Group and the United Women's Orchestra, performed with Guus Janssen and Maggie Nicols, and began working in German theatre in 1979. She has also worked in projects with Cooper, Heiner Goebbels and Alfred Harth. Roelofs is a member of the cabaret-duo Niemann and Roelofs with Cornelia Niemann, the duo Plenar/Roelofs with pianist Elvira Plenar, and the Triple A trombone trio with Annie Whitehead and Abbie Conant. She leads the Waste Watchers with Johannes Krämer and Dirk Marwedel, which released Music From the Land of Milk & Honey in 1997.

== Discography ==
- Henry Cow, Western Culture (1979)
- Duo Roelofs/Plenar, Duo Roelofs/Plenar (1991)
- Duo Roelofs/Plenar, Pas de Deux (1998)
- The Waste Watchers, Music from the Land of Milk & Honey (1997)
- United Women's Orchestra, Blue One (1999)
- United Women's Orchestra, Virgo Supercluster (2002)

== Works cited ==
- Cutler, Chris, ed. (2009). "The Road: Volumes 6–10". The 40th Anniversary Henry Cow Box Set (box set booklet). Henry Cow. London: Recommended Records.
- Piekut, Benjamin (2019). Henry Cow: The World Is a Problem. Duke University Press. ISBN 978-1-47800-405-9.
