= Oh Moscow =

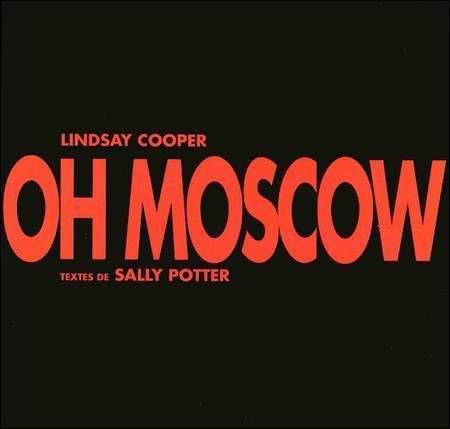

Live album by Lindsay Cooper
- Released: 1991
- Recorded: 8 October 1989
- Venue: 7th Victoriaville Festival, Quebec, Canada
- Genre: Avant-garde jazz; experimental music; free improvisation
- Length: 59:27
- Label: Victo

Lindsay Cooper chronology
Music for Other Occasions (1986)	Oh Moscow (1991)	An Angel on the Bridge (1991)

Oh Moscow is a 1991 live album by English experimental musician and composer Lindsay Cooper. It is a recording of a song cycle of the same name performed at the 7th Victoriaville Festival in Quebec, Canada on 8 October 1989. The work was composed in 1987 by Cooper with lyrics written by English film director and screenwriter Sally Potter. The song cycle reflects on the Cold War that divided Europe at the time.

== Background ==
Oh Moscow was composed in 1987 by Lindsay Cooper, an English experimental musician from Henry Cow and the Feminist Improvising Group. The song texts were written by English film director, screenwriter and singer Sally Potter. Cooper had worked previously with Potter in the Feminist Improvising Group, and composed music for some of Potter's films, including The Gold Diggers (1983). After Potter had been to the Soviet Union several times on filming projects, Cooper and Potter began discussing ideas for a composition about the effects of the Cold War. When organizers of the annual Zurich Jazz Festival in Switzerland contacted Cooper in 1987 and enquired whether she had something new to perform, she decided to write Oh Moscow for the festival.

Cooper scored the work for a multi-national group comprising English, German, Czech and Danish musicians, and she cites her collaborations with jazz pianist and composer Mike Westbrook as an influence in her approach to writing Oh Moscow. Andrew Jones wrote in his book Plunderphonics, 'Pataphysics & Pop Mechanics: An Introduction to Musique Actuelle, that Oh Moscow "virtually defects and demands stylistic asylum". He said that the music includes "cool '50s jazz", a "vaudeville showstopper", with touches of Soft Machine, flamenco and gypsy music.

Oh Moscow's first performance was at the Zurich Jazz Festival on 31 October 1987, which was followed by successful performances in Europe, North America and Russia between 1988 and 1993, making it Cooper's best known work. This album is an unedited recording of the group's performance at the 7th Victoriaville Festival in Quebec, Canada on 8 October 1989. At the Victoriaville concert Cooper introduced Oh Moscow to the audience with these words: "The songs tonight are about the cold war, a silent war that cuts deep." Little over a month later the Berlin Wall was pulled down and the Cold War came to an end.

== Performances ==
The multi-national group Lindsay Cooper assembled to perform Oh Moscow consisted of Cooper (England; bassoon, alto saxophone), Sally Potter (England; vocals), Elvira Plenar (Croatia/Germany; piano, synthesizer), Alfred Harth (Germany; tenor saxophone, clarinet), Phil Minton (England; trumpet, vocals), Hugh Hopper (England; bass guitar) and Marilyn Mazur (Denmark; drums). Charles Hayward later took over on drums, followed by Peter Fairclough and Chris Cutler, although Mazur drummed again on the North American tour in October 1989.

- 1987
  - 31 October: Zurich, Switzerland (Marilyn Mazur on drums) – Oh Moscow's debut performance
- 1988
  - 11 March: Basel, Switzerland (Marilyn Mazur on drums)
  - 12 March: Bern, Switzerland (Marilyn Mazur on drums)
  - 13 March: Frankfurt, Germany (Marilyn Mazur on drums)
  - 10 June: Mainz, Germany (Charles Hayward on drums)
  - 11 June: Cologne, Germany (Charles Hayward on drums)
  - 12 June: Frankfurt, Germany (Charles Hayward on drums)
  - 20 October: Leverkusen, Germany (Charles Hayward on drums)
- 1989
  - 10 February: Amsterdam, Netherlands (Charles Hayward on drums)
  - 12 February: Williamsburg, Germany (Charles Hayward on drums)
  - 13 February: Hildesheim, Germany (Charles Hayward on drums)
  - 15–16 February: East Berlin, Germany (Charles Hayward on drums)
  - 18 February: West Berlin, Germany (Charles Hayward on drums)
  - 15 July: Nickelsdorf, Germany (Charles Hayward on drums)
  - 9 September: Karlsruhe, Germany (Charles Hayward on drums)
  - 4 October: Toronto, Canada (Marilyn Mazur on drums)
  - 5 October: Boston, MA, United States (Marilyn Mazur on drums)
  - 6 October: Hartford, CT, United States (Marilyn Mazur on drums)
  - 8 October: Victoriaville, QC, Canada (Marilyn Mazur on drums) – recorded and released on the Oh Moscow album
- 1990
  - 17 July: Imola, Italy (Charles Hayward on drums)
  - 3 November: Tampere, Finland (Peter Fairclough on drums)
- 1991
  - 25 September: Moscow, Russia (Chris Cutler on drums)
  - 28 September: Volgograd, Russia (Chris Cutler on drums)
- 1993
  - 22 May: London, England (Chris Cutler on drums)

Source: Hugh Hopper Chronology.

In 1999 an orchestral arrangement of Oh Moscow by Veryan Weston was performed at the Bologna Opera House in Italy. In November 2014 half of the songs from the song cycle was performed live by Harth, Minton and Potter with Cutler, Weston and others in A Celebration of Lindsay Cooper concerts, two in England and one in Italy.

== Reception ==
Professional ratings
Review scores
Source	Rating
AllMusic	4.5/5 stars

AllMusic reviewer Michael G. Nastos wrote that Oh Moscow is "a defiant musical challenge to Europe, the United States, and other politically charged climes". He said that the lyrics are "provocative" and the balance of composition and improvisation makes the work "captivating". Nastos described the album as "the ultimate in urban landscape sound sculpture", and said that "[h]istorically and musically it deserves to be judged with the highest reverence".

== Track listing ==
All tracks composed by Lindsay Cooper; song texts written by Sally Potter.

No.	Title	Length
1.	"England Descending"	7:46
2.	"The Allies"	5:30
3.	"Lovers"	4:10
4.	"Oh the Passing of Time, Europe"	4:12
5.	"Liberty Bonds"	6:38
6.	"On German Soil"	7:20
7.	"Curtain Descending"	3:10
8.	"Prayer"	9:57
9.	"Forgotten Fruit"	4:23
10.	"Oh Moscow"	6:21

Source: AllMusic, Discogs.

== Personnel ==
- Lindsay Cooper – composer, bassoon, alto saxophone
- Sally Potter – lyricist, vocals
- Elvira Plenar – piano, synthesizer
- Alfred Harth – tenor saxophone, clarinet
- Phil Minton – trumpet, vocals
- Hugh Hopper – electric bass guitar
- Marilyn Mazur – drums

Source: AllMusic, Discogs.

== See also ==
- List of songs about the Cold War

== Cited works ==
- LeFanu, Nicola (1994). Reclaiming the Muse. Harwood Academic Publishers. p. 71. ISBN 978-3-7186-5528-1.
- Jones, Andrew (1995). "Lindsay Cooper". Plunderphonics, 'Pataphysics & Pop Mechanics: An Introduction to Musique Actuelle. SAF Publishing Ltd. pp. 104–111. ISBN 978-0-946719-15-0.
