= Georgina Born =

British musician, academic, anthropologist

Georgina Born OBE FBA
- Born: Georgina Emma Mary Born; Wheatley, Oxfordshire, England
- Other name: Georgie Born
- Education: University College London
- Occupations: academic, anthropologist, musicologist, musician
- Known for: Leading exponent of the use of ethnography to study cultural production, particularly music, television and information technologies
- Father: Gustav Born
- Relatives: Max Born (grandfather); Olivia Newton-John (cousin)
- Musical career
- Genres: Avant-rock; free jazz
- Instruments: Cello; bass; piano
- Formerly of: Henry Cow; Michael Nyman Band; National Health
- Website: UCL webpage

Georgina Emma Mary Born, OBE is a British academic, anthropologist, musicologist and musician. As a musician she is known as Georgie Born and for her work in Henry Cow and with Lindsay Cooper.

== Background ==
Born was born in Wheatley, Oxfordshire, the granddaughter of the physicist and Nobel laureate Max Born, daughter of the pharmacologist Gustav Born, and cousin of the pop singer Olivia Newton-John. Born attended Godolphin and Latymer School then Purcell School in London and Dartington Hall School in Devon.

== Music ==
Born studied the cello and piano at the Royal College of Music in London, and performed classical and modern music including stints with the Michael Nyman Band, the Penguin Cafe Orchestra and the Flying Lizards. She also studied for a year at the Chelsea School of Art.

In June 1976, she joined the English avant-rock group Henry Cow as bass guitarist and cellist, following the departure of John Greaves. Henry Cow was in a period of intensive touring and Born toured Europe with the group for two years.

After Henry Cow, Born performed and recorded with a number of groups and musicians, including fellow Henry Cow member Lindsay Cooper, National Health, Bruford, and Mike Westbrook, particularly as a cellist in the Mike Westbrook Orchestra. Her playing is prominent on Westbrook's album, The Cortege. Late in 1977, Born, Cooper, Sally Potter and Maggie Nichols founded the Feminist Improvising Group. She also recorded with The Raincoats, and played improvised music with Lol Coxhill, Steve Beresford, David Toop and others as a member of the London Musicians' Collective.

During the 1980s, Born was an occasional member of Derek Bailey's Company, and played cello and bass guitar on numerous soundtracks for television and film for composers Lindsay Cooper and Mike Westbrook, as well as the soundtrack for the Stephen Poliakoff play Caught on a Train (1980). She had a walk-on part in Sally Potter's film The Gold Diggers (1983).

== Academia ==
Born studied completed an anthropology degree and then PhD at University College London. Her first academic job was at Brunel University, where she assisted Roger Silverstone in setting up the degree in Communication and Information Studies. Born moved to a lectureship in the Department of Media and Communications at Goldsmiths' College for 8 years.

Born obtained a lectureship in the Faculty of Social and Political Sciences at the University of Cambridge. She was a professor at Cambridge from 2006-10.

In 2010 Born was awarded an Advanced Grant by the European Research Council for a major programme of research on the transformation of music by digital media. Subsequently, she moved to become Professor of Music and Anthropology at the University of Oxford. Since 2012, she was also a Fellow of Mansfield College, Oxford. In 2014, she was elected a Fellow of the British Academy, the United Kingdom's national academy for the humanities and social sciences.

Born returned to UCL, where she edited and co-wrote Music and Digital Media: A Planetary Anthropology (UCL Press, 2022). She was awarded the International Musicological Society's Guido Adler Prize in 2024.

== Notable academic achievements ==
Born uses ethnography to study cultural production, particularly music, television and information technologies, and is a leading exponent both of institutional ethnography and of anthropology's application to the critical study of Western modernity. In relation to music, television and IT her work has ranged from studies of cultural production and cultural politics, to intellectual property, authorship and subjectivity, to materiality, technology and mediation. She is an international authority on computer music and musical modernism in the twentieth century, and also on contemporary media policy, the BBC and public service broadcasting in the United Kingdom and Europe.

Born's earlier research involved anthropological and sociological studies of art and popular musics. Her first book, Rationalising Culture: IRCAM, Boulez, and the Institutionalisation of the Musical Avant-Garde (1995), combined ethnography with cultural history in an analysis of the crisis in twentieth-century art music through the example of IRCAM, the computer music research institute founded by Pierre Boulez. The book (edited with David Hesmondhalgh) Western Music and Its Others: Difference, Representation and Appropriation in Music (2000) integrates approaches from musicology, anthropology and post-colonial theory to address how music can be employed to represent social identities and cultural differences, and the techniques whereby both art and popular musics appropriate other musics.

Born's second ethnography, Uncertain Vision: Birt, Dyke and the Reinvention of the BBC (Secker and Warburg, 2004; Vintage, 2005), analyses the transformation of the BBC in the preceding decade. It describes the effects on the corporation of Director General John Birt's implementation of the 'new public management': marketisation and market research, audit and accountability procedures – all intended to boost efficiency and increase the BBC's democratic functioning by effecting greater responsiveness to its audiences. The study therefore represents one of the most detailed accounts of the impact of commercial management techniques on Britain's public sector. Derived from fieldwork in the mid-1990s and the early 2000s mainly conducted within the corporation's Drama, Documentary, News and Current Affairs departments, the book adds substance to claims that the BBC has moved towards a market orientation to the detriment of its public service remit. Born argues that this resulted from a combination of the imposition of neo-liberal policies and wider changes in the British and international broadcasting ecology.

In 2001–02 Born made a study of the digital strategies of the BBC and Channel Four, Britain's main public service broadcasters, which showed that Channel Four was being driven primarily by commercialism and had drifted seriously from its public service remit for innovation and diversity. She has subsequently written both policy interventions and normative essays on the changing nature of public service broadcasting with the advent of digital media. Born was invited in 2005 to give written and oral evidence to the House of Lords Select Committee on BBC Charter Review, and has lectured to public service broadcasters in Europe and Australia as well as to broadcasting and journalist trade unions in Britain and Europe.

Between 2004 and 2006 Born was involved in research (with Marilyn Strathern and Andrew Barry) on interdisciplinarity in knowledge and cultural production, in which she carried out case studies of the use of ethnography by the IT industry, and on art-science and new media art. Born has developed an interdisciplinary approach – using anthropology, sociology, musicology and the arts – to theorising cultural and media production that builds on and extends the work of Pierre Bourdieu, one that integrates aesthetics and history with social scientific perspectives. She has published a number of papers in scientific journals, including Social Anthropology, Cultural Anthropology, American Anthropologist, Journal of Material Culture, Screen, Cultural Values, Javnost, The Political Quarterly, Media, Culture and Society, New Formations and Twentieth Century Music. She is on the editorial boards of Anthropological Theory, Cultural Sociology, New Media and Society, and Cambridge Forum on Al: Culture and Society. Born has also been on the editorial boards of Popular Music, Free Associations and Journal of the Royal Musical Society.

In 2010 Born and Ben Walton (a University lecturer in the faculty of music at Cambridge) piloted a Mellon-funded interdisciplinary graduate seminar series on 'Music and Society' at Cambridge University's Centre for Research on Arts, Social Sciences and Humanities. This series was open to both graduates in sociology and graduates in musicology and attempted to provide interdisciplinary discussion covering 'a range of subjects that explore music's place and functions within diverse social environments'.

Born was appointed Officer of the Order of the British Empire (OBE) in the 2016 Birthday Honours for services to musicology, anthropology, and higher education.

== Publications ==
- Born, Georgina (1995). Rationalizing Culture: IRCAM, Boulez, and the Institutionalization of the Musical Avant-Garde. University of California Press. ISBN 0-520-20216-3.
- Born, Georgina; Hesmondhalgh, David (2000). Western Music and Its Others: Difference, Representation, and Appropriation in Music. University of California Press. ISBN 0-520-22084-6.
- Born, Georgina (2004). Uncertain Vision: Birt, Dyke and the Reinvention of the BBC. Secker & Warburg. ISBN 0-436-20562-9.
- Born, Georgina; Barry, Andrew (2013). Interdisciplinarity: Reconfigurations of the Social and Natural Sciences. Routledge. ISBN 978-1-138-84334-9.
- Born, Georgina (2013). Music, Sound and Space: Transformations of Public and Private Experience. Cambridge University Press. ISBN 978-0-511-67585-0.
- Born, Georgina; Lewis, Eric; Straw, Will (2017). Improvisation and Social Aesthetics. Duke University Press. ISBN 978-0-8223-6194-7.
- Born, Georgina (2022). Music and Digital Media: A planetary anthropology. UCL Press. ISBN 978-1-80008-243-4.

== Discography ==
With Art Bears

- Hopes and Fears (1978)

With National Health

- Of Queues and Cures (1978)

With Henry Cow

- Western Culture (1979)
- The 40th Anniversary Henry Cow Box Set (2009, 9xCD+DVD, Recommended Records, UK)
- The Henry Cow Box Redux: The Complete Henry Cow (2019, 17xCD+DVD, Recommended Records, UK)

With Feminist Improvising Group

- Feminist Improvising Group (1979, Cassette, UK)

With Bruford

- Gradually Going Tornado (1980)

With Stormy Six

- Macchina Maccheronica (1980)

With Mike Westbrook

- Bright as Fire (1980)
- The Cortege (1982)
- On Duke's Birthday (HatART, 1985)

With Lindsay Cooper

- Rags (1981)
- The Golddiggers – original soundtrack to the film The Gold Diggers by Sally Potter (1983)
- Music for Other Occasions (1986)

With The Raincoats

- Odyshape (1981)

With Peter Blegvad

- The Naked Shakespeare (1983)

With News from Babel

- Work Resumed on the Tower (1984)

With The Orckestra

- "Unreleased Orckestra Extract" (3" CD single, 2006, Recommended Records, UK)
