= After Babel =

1975 book by George Steiner

- Cover of the first edition
- Author: George Steiner
- Cover artist: The (Little) Tower of Babel by Pieter Bruegel the Elder, 1563
- Language: English
- Subjects: Language, translation
- Publisher: Oxford University Press
- Publication date: 1975
- Publication place: United Kingdom
- Media type: Print (hardcover and paperback)
- Pages: 520 (first edition)
- ISBN: 0-19-212196-0
- OCLC: 1193209
- Dewey Decimal: 418/.02
- LC Class: P306 .S66

After Babel: Aspects of Language and Translation (1975; second edition 1992; third edition 1998) is a linguistics book by literary critic George Steiner, in which the author deals with the "Babel problem" of multiple languages.

After Babel is a comprehensive study of the subject of language and translation. It is both a controversial and seminal work that covers a great deal of new ground and has remained the most thorough book on this topic since its publication. Director Peter Bush of the British Centre for Literary Translation at the University of East Anglia described the book as a "pioneering work which revealed all communication as a form of translation, and how central translation is to relations between cultures." Daniel Hahn at ContemporaryWriters.com wrote that "It is extraordinary in making a real contribution to translation studies, while remaining fairly self-contained and accessible to people who have never before given the matter a second thought."

After Babel was adapted for television in 1977 as The Tongues of Men, and was the inspiration behind the creation in 1983 of the English experimental rock group News from Babel. After Babel also inspired work by cultural psychiatrist Vincenzo Di Nicola on intercultural communication and cultural family therapy, adopting "beyond Babel" as a metaphor.

== Synopsis ==
In After Babel Steiner states "To understand is to decipher. To hear significance is to translate." He challenges conventional theories of translation by maintaining that all human communication within and between languages is translation. He argues that deception was the reason for the development of different languages: it was humanity's deep desire for privacy and territory that saw the creation of thousands of languages, each designed to maintain secrecy and cultural isolation. Real translation between languages is impossible because the original meaning is always lost: the translated text is tainted by the translator's own cultural beliefs, knowledge and attitudes.

Steiner states that the reason for the lack of new developments in translation theory is that translation is a hermeneutical task, "not a science, but an exact art." This is problematic for machine translation. He then presents a new translation model that combines philosophical hermeneutics with existing translation studies to form a "systematic hermeneutic translation theory". The new model comprises four "movements": trust, aggression, incorporation, and restitution. "Trust" and "restitution" honour the source text and its author's intentions, while "aggression" and "incorporation" benefits the translator.

== Criticism ==
Despite the significance of After Babel as a central work in the philosophy of translation, the book has been criticized by many authors. In a substantial rereading of the "hermeneutic motion", Kharmandar, among other things, questions even the authenticity of the "hermeneutics" in Steiner's theorizing, stating, "Th[is] investigation, quite contrary to popular belief, reveals that Steiner’s reading only partially relies on hermeneutics, and that at many levels it is counter-productive to hermeneutic research."

== Publication history ==
After Babel was first published in January 1975 by Oxford University Press in the United Kingdom. In 1992 a second edition was published by Oxford University Press with major revisions by Steiner, including a new preface, and new and expanded notes and references. A third edition, with minor revisions by Steiner, was published by Oxford University Press in 1998.

== Works cited ==
- Steiner, George (1975). After Babel. Oxford, England: Oxford University Press. ISBN 0-19-212196-0.
