= Feminist Improvising Group =

English experimental music group

- The Feminist Improvising Group, October 1977; L–R: Corinne Liensol, Maggie Nicols, Georgie Born, Lindsay Cooper, Cathy Williams

Background information
- Origin: London, England
- Genres: Avant-garde jazz, free improvisation, experimental music
- Years active: 1977–1982
- Spinoffs: European Women's Improvising Group; Les Diaboliques
- Spinoff of: Henry Cow
- Past members: Maggie Nicols; Lindsay Cooper; Georgie Born; Corinne Liensol; Cathy Williams; Irène Schweizer; Sally Potter; Annemarie Roelofs; Frankie Armstrong; Angèle Veltmeijer; Françoise Dupety

The Feminist Improvising Group (FIG) were a five- to eight-piece international free improvising avant-garde jazz and experimental music ensemble formed in London in 1977 by Scottish vocalist Maggie Nicols and English bassoonist/composer Lindsay Cooper. Their debut performance was at a "Music for Socialism" festival at the Almost Free Theatre in London in October 1977, and they toured Europe several times in the late 1970s and early 1980s.

FIG were the first publicly performing women-only group of improvisers and challenged the hitherto male-dominated musical improvisation community. The group consisted of women from different backgrounds with different levels of musicianship, and their concerts were a combination of music and theatre that dealt with everyday women's issues. FIG also integrated "lesbian sexuality" into their performances that Canadian academic Julie Dawn Smith said, "queered" the improvisational space and "demanded queer listening".

FIG were generally not well received by male improvisers, who Nicols said criticised their technical ability and their "irreverent approach to technique and tradition". Smith noted that FIG's performances were also criticised by some feminists for being "too virtuosic and abstract", but they generally received positive reactions from both women and men at concerts. A review in the improvised music magazine Musics said that FIG's debut performance "was a welcome contrast to the previous performances [of the evening] which had been singularly humourless."

In 1983, FIG evolved into the European Women's Improvising Group (EWIG), bowing to pressure to tone down their name. FIG were influential on the second-generation improvisation scene and spawned a number of women-only improvising groups and events. FIG were also educational in that they exposed new audiences to improvisation and feminism.

== History ==
The Feminist Improvising Group (FIG) was founded in London in 1977 by Scottish vocalist Maggie Nicols from Centipede and English bassoonist/composer Lindsay Cooper from Henry Cow. Nicols and Cooper first discussed the idea of an all-women improvising group at a musician's union meeting. Cooper said, "we agreed that improvisation had become very important and no women were doing it. And suddenly we thought, well let's do it! Let's get women together and do it ourselves!" While Nicols and Cooper had both performed frequently with men, they had little experience performing with other women. Their involvement in class politics as well as feminist and lesbian activism prompted them to pursue this project. An opportunity presented itself in mid-1977, when organisers of the "Music for Socialism" festival approached Nicols and asked if she could arrange some female performers for the next concert as so few had featured in previous events. Nicols and Cooper put together a five-piece ensemble with themselves, plus cellist/bassist Georgie Born, also from Henry Cow, vocalist/pianist Cathy Williams from the British duo Rag Doll (with ex Henry Cow member Geoff Leigh), and trumpeter Corinne Liensol from British feminist rock band Jam Today.

FIG's debut performance was at the next "Music for Socialism" festival at the Almost Free Theatre in London on 30 October 1977. They had originally intended calling themselves the "Women's Improvising Group", but discovered that the organisers had billed them as the "Feminist Improvising Group". Nicols said that the "political statement of the band's name never even came from us! But we just thought, 'OK, they've called us feminist, we'll work with that'". FIG's act at the event was a combination of music and comedy, and focused on "women's experience" and "mundane daily things". Nicols described it as "quite anarchic. It had elements of theatre; we had props, we were chopping onions, I was rushing around with perfume, it was completely improvised."

FIG became the first publicly performing women-only improvising group, and they challenged the established improvising community with performances that were theatrical, with politics and farce supplementing their music. They staged parodies around the role of women in society and incorporated domestic "found objects" in their performances, including "vacuum cleaners, brooms, dustpans, pots and pans, and egg slicers". Their performances often had some of the women cleaning the stage, while the others huddled in a group to "explore the sonic possibilities of household items." They also parodied rock and jazz groups and the roles of female singers as "chicks and divas" and women as "backing musicians". FIG broke down the barriers that traditionally existed between the performer and the audience by engaging in "antiphonal exchange[s]" with them, and promoting the notion that "anyone can do it". They redefined free improvisation by introducing "social virtuosity", the ability to communicate with the other musicians and the audience.

In the late 1970s and early 1980s, FIG toured Europe several times, where they played at festivals at various venues, including Paris, Berlin, Rome, Copenhagen, Stockholm and Reykjavík. When Cooper and Born were performing with Henry Cow in Zürich in early 1978, Cooper invited Swiss pianist Irène Schweizer to join FIG. English filmmaker Sally Potter, who played saxophone and sang, joined the group in April 1978. Dutch trombonist Annemarie Roelofs, English singer Frankie Armstrong, Dutch woodwind player Angèle Veltmeijer, and French saxophonist and guitarist Françoise Dupety also played intermittently with the group. Some of FIG's performances consisted of up to eight women.

Nicols left FIG in 1980 to form another all-women group called Contradictions. In 1983, under the helm of Schweizer, FIG evolved into The European Women's Improvising Group (EWIG), bowing to pressure that their name was "too political". EWIG included Schweizer, Cooper, Roelofs, French double bassist Joëlle Léandre, and French singer Annick Nozati.

== Analysis ==
In the 1970s there was a view that the free improvisation music space was largely the domain of male heterosexuals, and that women were marginalized. Canadian academic Julie Dawn Smith wrote in her 2004 essay, "Playing Like a Girl: The Queer Laughter of the Feminist Improvising Group", that "The opportunity for freedom in relation to sexual difference, gender, and sexuality for women improvisers was strangely absent from the discourses and practices of free jazz and free improvisation". Born said "we found ourselves in situations implicitly saturated with gender dynamics ... in which our musical 'voice' was rendered somehow inappropriate, or was overwhelmed and could not emerge or be heard". When the Feminist Improvising Group appeared in 1977, they challenged the established male-dominated musical improvising community. FIG were a mixture of white, black, lesbian, straight, working- and middle-class women. Nicols wanted the group to be open to all women of different backgrounds and different levels of musicianship, even those who had not improvised before. She saw these differing abilities, which gave rise to unexpected results, as a strength and not a weakness. According to critic Dana Reason Myers, "The result was a music that had to be taken on its own terms, as music that decidedly and consciously included the politics of being women, musicians, improvisers, and members of a society."

"[T]he spectacle of the Feminist Improvising Group was a queer sounding that demanded queer listening, an antiphonal and erotic playing by ear that heard pleasure and desire in the strange resonances and sonic exchanges of women's embodied, lived experience."

— Julie Dawn Smith, "Playing Like a Girl: The Queer Laughter of the Feminist Improvising Group" (2004)

While some of the members lacked conventional musical skills, they were "politically very right" and quickly adapted to improvising. Because of the nature of free improvisation, the women were able to perform together without concerns about competency. Born said that FIG functioned very differently from a mixed group: "when you are playing with men, there is an element of competition; they tend to feel that there is a threat from women. In an all-women band we are released from that kind of pressure." Born added that without men, women are more honest and open with each other, and are more receptive to what each member of the group is doing.

FIG integrated "lesbian sexuality" in their improvised performances: their stage acts often included "fights" and "hugs" that Smith described as "violating taboos of musical propriety and masculinist competition that prohibited musicians from touching one another". According to Smith, "refus[ing] to 'pass' as straight opened possibilities for the improvisation of female sexuality. In effect FIG queered space of improvisational practice."

Smith wrote that male heterosexual improvisers typically dismissed women in audiences as not important, seeing them as "either wives, girlfriends, or groupies". She said FIG seized this opportunity to change the relationship between improvisers and female audiences. Using their "skills of social and technical virtuosity", FIG improvised around issues important to women, and thereby "drew women into their music who might not otherwise be concerned with the concept of free improvisation." Smith explained that even women not familiar with the technicalities of free improvisation still related to a group of women on stage "foreground[ing] their bodies and their sounds for the pleasure of other woman". (Note: Born wrote in 2017 that this statement by Smith is "a misinterpretation" of what was happening at the time, and is the result of retrospectively labelling the group as having "a 'queer perspective' emanating from 'queer women'". Born said political tensions over feminist and lesbian issues existed in the group. There was political lesbianism, "lifelong" lesbianism and socialist feminism with no lesbian identities, and as a result, their so-called "queer" performances were "far from ... smooth or consensual".)^{[italics in the source]}

Writing in The Guardian, Nicolas Soames described FIG's music as often comprising "hard trombone chords, angular bursts, and restless scurryings made by every imaginable sound-producing object"; it sometimes drifts into "blues-like dirge[s]" or tangos, but is different from the "unrelieved adventures into the abstract to be heard from some male improvising groups." American academic David G. Pier said FIG used free jazz's "extreme timbres" to enhance their live performances, which he described as "in-your-face queer sexuality and feminist shock politics."

Smith characterised performances by FIG as a "sonic negotiation of eroticism, resistance, liberation, joy, pleasure, power, and agency, a multilayered call and response between individual improvisers and a community of listeners". She added that FIG were "instrumental in encouraging listeners/interpreters to negotiate the work from a queer perspective, opening a space for the listener who responds to the laughter of women with her own improvised laughter."

== Reception ==
Roelofs recalled that critics of the Feminist Improvising Group were always either very positive, or very negative; there was never any middle-ground. Nicols and Roelofs said they received little support from male improvisers, who criticised their technical ability and referred to them as women, not musicians. FIG's message that "anyone can do it" antagonised many who value "technical virtuosity" and "improvisational competence". Nicols said they also complained about FIG's "irreverent approach to technique and tradition", while Smith suggested that they may have felt threatened by the "spectacle of so many unsupervised and unpredictable women on the stage". Schweizer recalled that FIG were invited to perform at the Total Music Meeting in Berlin in November 1979 because she had played at the festival before (in all-men groups). But after seeing FIG perform, the organiser asked Schweizer "how come you brought such a group, they can't play, and they are not good enough." Nicols said that avant-garde musician Alexander von Schlippenbach also complained about FIG being there, saying that "we couldn't play our instruments" and that he could have found "loads of men that would have played a lot better".

Recalling FIG's appearance at the Total Music Meeting, guitarist Eugene Chadbourne said "The lack of support for FIG must obviously extend beyond the boundaries of that group into the entire area of women musicians ... I am sure the lack of men on stage made some men feel excluded." Schweizer believed that many male improvisers felt threatened by FIG because of their use of humour, "We were not that serious, like men, ... they take [improvising] so seriously". Born described FIG's humour as "very iconoclastic and very surreal, or very silly. There were no big boys there standing judging." On the issue of FIG being a women-only group, Nicols remarked, "It's amazing the number of men that were saying, 'Why are there no men?' And yet nobody had ever dreamed to think of asking why there were men only [groups]."

Some feminist audiences were also critical of FIG, saying that they were "too virtuosic and abstract". At a Women's Festival at The Drill Hall in London, many women in the audience were unfamiliar with "free music" and accused FIG of being "elitist" and "inaccessible". This was frustrating for the members of the group who expected support from such quarters.

But FIG also received positive reactions from both men and women at concerts. Nicols recalled the "dykes" in the audience who had come to see them at FIG's first performance: they were into disco and soul and sat patiently through the other improvisers, but when FIG came on, "They laughed their heads off." A review in the improvised music magazine Musics said that FIG's set "was a welcome contrast to the previous performances [of the evening] which had been singularly humourless." Cooper recalled a comment made to her by a female artist working in film: "I don't know what on earth you're doing but I like it."

== Influence ==
The Feminist Improvising Group, and its successor, The European Women's Improvising Group, spawned a number of women-only improvising groups and events. In 1980 Contradictions was formed by Nicols, who modelled it on FIG. The founding members included Nicols, Jackie Lansley and Sylvia Hallett, with Schweizer and Joëlle Léandre participating in their first concert. Contradictions went on to become a women's workshop run by Nicols in which "anyone could participate". Schweizer was one of the organisers of the Canaille festivals that staged the first International Women's Jazz Festival for Improvised Music in 1986 in Frankfurt. In the early 1990s, Nicols, Schweizer and Léandre formed the "highly theatrical and often satirical" improvising trio, Les Diaboliques, who released three albums between 1994 and 1998.

Nicols said that FIG were "tremendously influential" on the second-generation improvisation scene that developed in its wake. Léandre, after seeing FIG for the first time performing in Paris, said she had been "shocked ... to see only women onstage". FIG were also educational in that they exposed free improvisation to women unfamiliar with the genre, and acquainted men with feminism.

== Discography ==
=== Live albums ===
- Feminist Improvising Group (1979, CT)
  - Extracts from live performances in Copenhagen (29 April 1978), Stockholm (20 August 1978) and Reykjavík (18–19 November 1978)

=== Compilations ===
- Various artists: Bara Brudar (1978, LP)
  - Includes one track by FIG recorded live at the Musik Från Kvinnofestivalen in Stockholm (18–20 August 1978)
- Various artists: Another Evening at Logos, 1974/79/81 (2015, 2xLP)
  - Includes one track by FIG recorded live at the IXth International Multi Media Festival in Ghent, Belgium (22 February 1979)

== Members ==
- Maggie Nicols – vocals
- Lindsay Cooper – bassoon, oboe, sopranino saxophone, piano
- Georgie Born – cello, bass guitar
- Corinne Liensol – trumpet
- Cathy Williams – keyboards, vocals
- Irène Schweizer – piano, drums
- Sally Potter – vocals, alto saxophone
- Annemarie Roelofs – trombone, violin
- Frankie Armstrong – vocals
- Angèle Veltmeijer – flute, tenor saxophone, soprano saxophone
- Françoise Dupety – alto saxophone, guitar

== See also ==
- List of free improvising musicians and groups
