= Maggie Nicols =

Scottish vocalist and dancer (born 1948)

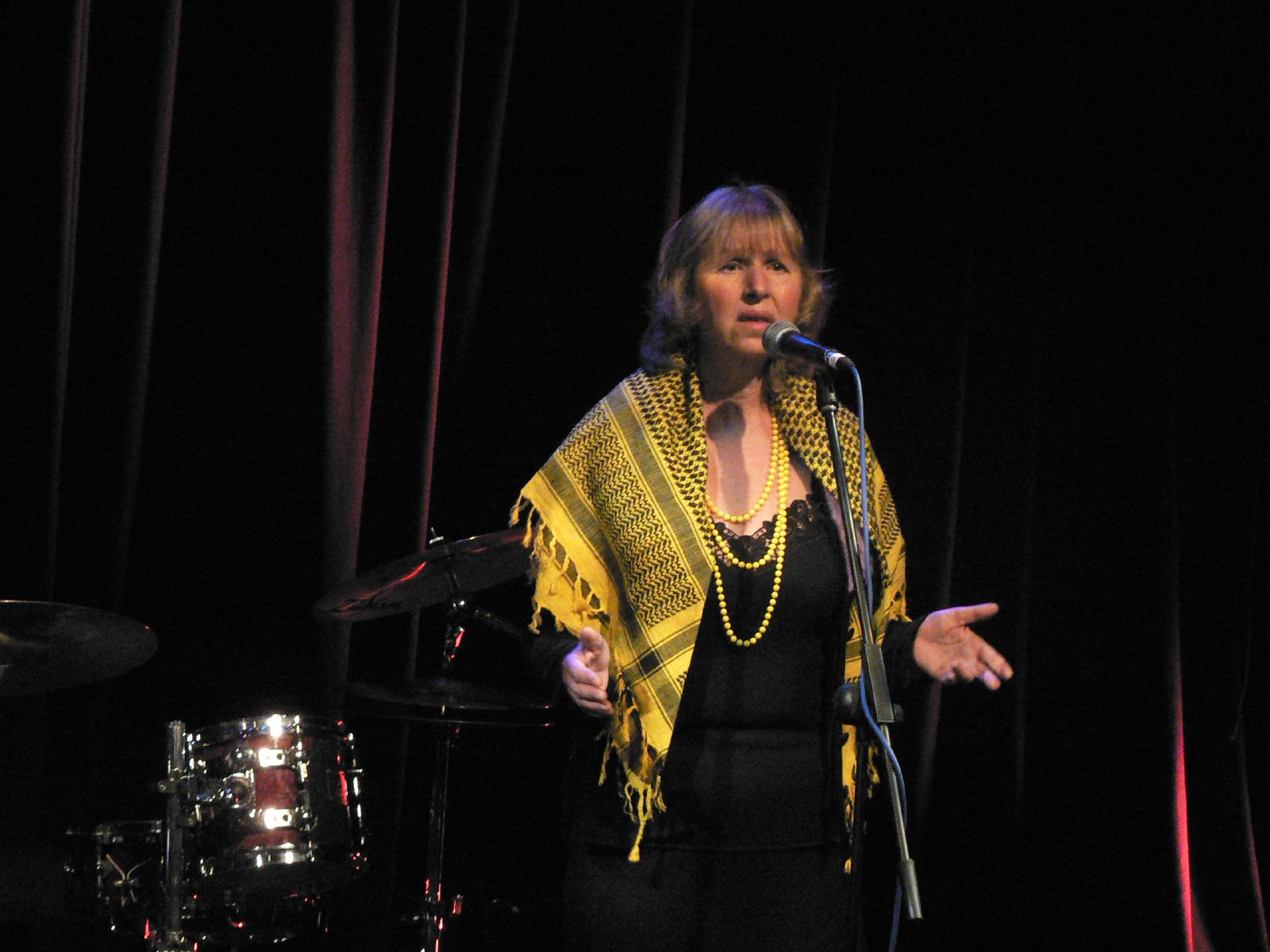
- Born: Margaret Nicolson; 24 February 1948 (age 78); Edinburgh, Scotland
- Occupations: Vocalist, dancer, performer

Maggie Nicols (or Nichols, as she originally spelled her name as a performer) (born 24 February 1948), is a Scottish free-jazz and improvising vocalist, dancer, and performer.

== Early life and career ==
Nicols was born in Edinburgh, Scotland, as Margaret Nicolson. Her father was from the Isle of Skye, and her mother was half-French, half-Berber, from North Africa. In her mid-teens she left school and started to work as a dancer at the Windmill Theatre. Her first singing engagement was in a strip club in Manchester in 1965. At about that time she became obsessed with jazz, and sang with bebop pianist Dennis Rose. From then on she sang in pubs, clubs, hotels, and in dance bands with some of the finest jazz musicians around. In the midst of all this she worked abroad for a year as a dancer (including a six-month stint at the Moulin Rouge in Paris).

In 1968, she went to London and joined (as Maggie Nichols) an early improvisational group, the Spontaneous Music Ensemble, with John Stevens, Trevor Watts, and Johnny Dyani, and the group performed that year at Berlin's then new avant-garde festival, Total Music Meeting. In the early 1970s she began running voice workshops at the Oval House Theatre, using free improvisational techniques that Stevens had introduced her to. She both acted in some of the productions and rehearsed regularly with a local rock band. Shortly afterwards she became part of Keith Tippett's fifty-piece British jazz/progressive rock big band Centipede, which included Julie Tippetts, Phil Minton, Robert Wyatt, Dudu Pukwana, and Alan Skidmore. She formed her own group Okuren, and later joined Tippetts, Minton, and Brian Eley to form the vocal group Voice. Around the same time she began collaborating with the Scottish percussionist Ken Hyder (who had recently moved to London) and his band Talisker. In 1978 Nicols recorded an album with the vocalist Julie Tippetts called Sweet and S'Ours on the FMP label.

By the late 1970s, Nicols had become an active feminist, and co-founded the Feminist Improvising Group, which performed across Europe, with Lindsay Cooper. She also organised Contradictions, a women's workshop performance group that began in 1980 and dealt with improvisation and other modes of performance in a variety of media including music and dance. Over the years, Nicols has collaborated with other women's groups, such as the Changing Women Theatre Group, and wrote music for a prime-time television series, Women in Sport. She also composed the music for a production by Common Stock Youth Theatre of Brecht's The Caucasian Chalk Circle.

== Later career ==
Nicols has also collaborated regularly over the years with Swiss pianist Irene Schweizer and French bassist Joelle Leandre, including tours and three recordings as the trio "Les Diaboliques". In 1991 she began a weekly free improvisational meeting in London, which became known as The Gathering, a taste of which was captured on the album The Gathering: For John Stevens. In 2015, Maggie Nicols performed at the Long Arms Festival in Moscow and at the Marina and Anastasia Tsvetaeva Literary and Art Museum in the city of Alexandrov. In 2020, she released her debut solo album entitled Creative Contradiction: Poetry, Story, Song & Sound on Cafe Oto's Takuroku label.

Nicols plays a Townley woman in the 2025 film The Testament of Ann Lee, also singing in the soundtrack alongside Phil Minton, Shelley Hirsch, Josephine Foster, Alan Sparhawk, and others.

== Discography ==
- Sweet and S'ours with Julie Tippetts (FMP, 1982)
- Live at the Bastille with Joelle Leandre, Lindsay Cooper (Sync Pulse, 1982)
- Nicols 'n' Nu with Peter Nu (Leo, 1985)
- Don't Assume with Peter Nu (Leo, 1987)
- Loverly Play World Wide Music with Loverly (ITM Records 1987)
- Live at Taktlos with Irene Schweizer (Intakt, 1986)
- The Storming of the Winter Palace with Irene Schweizer (Intakt, 1988)
- Sequences 72 & 73 with Paul Rutherford and Iskra 1912 (Emanem, 1997)
- Transitions with Caroline Kraabel, Charlotte Hug (Emanem, 2002)
- Human with Phil Hargreaves (Whi Music, 2012)
- Other Worlds with Peter Urpeth (FMR, 2017)
- Energy Being with the Glasgow Improvisers Orchestra (FMR, 2019)
- Creative Contradiction: Poetry, Story, Song & Sound (Takuroku, 2020)
- Are You Ready? (Otoroku, 2022)

=== With Les Diaboliques (Irène Schweizer, Nicols, Joëlle Léandre) ===
- Les Diaboliques (Intakt, 1994)
- Splitting Image (Intakt, 1997)
- Live at the Rhinefalls (Intakt, 2000)
- Jubilee Concert (DVD) (Intakt, 2009)

== Sources ==
- Maggie Nicols at AllMusic.
