= Lindsay Cooper =

English bassoon, oboe player and composer (1951–2013)

- With the Mike Westbrook Orchestra for The Cortège (1982)

Background information
- Born: 3 March 1951; Hornsey, North London, England
- Died: 18 September 2013 (aged 62) London, England
- Genres: Avant-rock; experimental; free improvisation; contemporary classical
- Occupations: Musician, composer
- Instruments: Bassoon, oboe
- Years active: 1971–1998
- Labels: Recommended, Victo
- Formerly of: Henry Cow, Comus, Feminist Improvising Group, News from Babel

Lindsay Cooper (3 March 1951 – 18 September 2013) was an English bassoon and oboe player and composer. Best known for her work with the band Henry Cow, she was also a member of Comus, National Health, News from Babel and David Thomas and the Pedestrians. She collaborated with a number of musicians, including Chris Cutler and Sally Potter, and co-founded the Feminist Improvising Group. She wrote scores for film and TV and a song cycle Oh Moscow which was performed live around the world in 1987. She also recorded a number of solo albums, including Rags (1980), The Gold Diggers (1983), and Music For Other Occasions (1986).

Cooper was diagnosed with multiple sclerosis in the late 1970s, but did not disclose it to the musical community until the late 1990s when her illness prevented her from performing live. In September 2013, Cooper died from the illness, in London, at the age of 62.

== Biography ==
=== Early life ===
Lindsay Cooper was born in Hornsey, North London. She began piano lessons at the age of 11, but switched to bassoon a few years later. Between 1965 and 1968, she studied classical music and bassoon at the Dartington College of Arts with Helen Glatz and at the Royal College of Music. She played in the National Youth Orchestra of Great Britain and became a member of the Royal Academy of Music in London. Towards the end of the 1960s, she lived in New York City for a year, during which time she became involved in music projects outside classical music.

When Cooper returned to the United Kingdom in 1971, she left classical music and became a part of the Canterbury scene. She joined the progressive rock band Comus, and although she only remained with the band for a year, it changed her whole approach to music. She added oboe and flute to her instrument repertoire, and started doing session work for other musicians, including Mike Oldfield on his album Hergest Ridge (1974). While working on a theatre project, Cooper encountered Henry Cow, an avant-rock group that would later launch her musical career on the world stage.

=== Henry Cow ===
In late 1973, Henry Cow asked Cooper to join them as a replacement for Geoff Leigh (tenor sax and flute) who had recently left. Her classical training interested the group as they were continually looking for new musical directions. In spite of having just had all four wisdom teeth extracted, she immediately joined the band in the studio to record their second album Unrest (1974). However, following their European tour supporting Captain Beefheart, the group reorganized themselves and asked Cooper to leave, performing as a quartet on their Scandinavian tour of September 1974. But she still continued to guest on their albums and by February 1975 she rejoined the group again and remained a permanent member until they split up in 1978.

In 1977, Cooper became one of Henry Cow's principal composers and contributed a number of compositions to their repertoire, including half of their final album, Western Culture (1978). The nature of the group enabled her to expand her musical horizons and experiment with new ideas. She also started playing soprano saxophone and piano during this period and began exploring improvisation techniques. Henry Cow toured Europe extensively, exposing Cooper to a variety of musical styles and musicians, all contributing to the development of her musical career.

=== Other projects ===
Cooper's work with Henry Cow attracted the attention of musicians from around the world and she had no shortage of performance and recording opportunities. Late in 1977, during Henry Cow's last years, Cooper co-founded the Feminist Improvising Group with Sally Potter, Maggie Nichols, Georgie Born (from Henry Cow) and Irène Schweizer. An international group of women improvisers, they toured Europe on and off between 1977 and 1982. She also kept a foot in the Canterbury scene by re-uniting briefly with Comus and playing on their second album, recording with Steve Hillage, and contributing to Hatfield and the North's The Rotters' Club (1975) album.

After Henry Cow, Cooper joined National Health (whom she had already sat in with), but left soon after when Dave Stewart departed. In 1980 she recorded her first solo album Rags, a song-cycle about sweatshops in Victorian England, with Chris Cutler, Fred Frith and Georgie Born (all from Henry Cow) and Phil Minton and Sally Potter. In 1982 Cooper formed her own group, The Lindsay Cooper Film Music Orchestra, in which she wrote and performed film and TV scores, including the soundtrack to Sally Potter's debut feature film, The Gold Diggers (1983), starring Julie Christie.

During the 1980s, she toured the United States with David Thomas and played in various bands in England led by jazz composer Mike Westbrook. In 1983 Cooper collaborated with Chris Cutler and formed the English avant-rock group News from Babel, composing all the music for their two albums, Work Resumed on the Tower (1984) and Letters Home (1986).

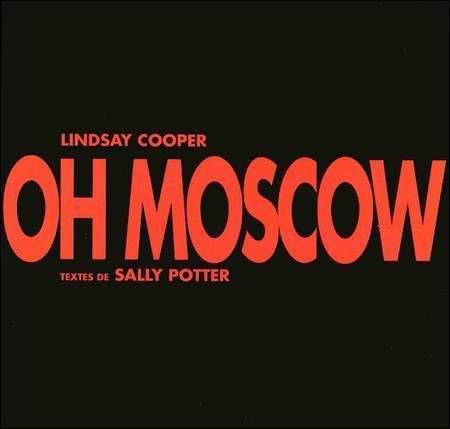
Oh Moscow CD cover (1991)

Cooper's best known work is her 1987 song-cycle Oh Moscow. It was another collaboration with Sally Potter, with Cooper composing the music and Potter the song texts. It premiered at the Zurich Jazz Festival that year and was subsequently performed in Europe, North America and Moscow. The songs dealt with issues facing a divided Europe during the Cold War. Ironically, the Berlin Wall came down 39 days after the work was first performed. Oh Moscow was recorded in October 1989 with Potter, Phil Minton, Hugh Hopper, Marilyn Mazur, Alfred Harth and Elvira Plenar at the 7th Festival International de Musique Actuelle de Victoriaville in Victoriaville, Quebec, Canada, and released on a CD in 1991.

In 1990, Cooper spent a few months in Australia where she gave solo performances on bassoon, saxophone and electronics. She also collaborated with Australian singer, writer and theatre director Robyn Archer, arranging and composing the music for Archer's play Cafe Fledermaus, and Sahara Dust, a large scale jazz vocal piece with lyrics by Archer. Sahara Dust was released on CD in 1993 with the voice of Phil Minton, and reflected on the 1990–91 Gulf War and its impact on the world at large. Later that year, she worked in John Wolf Brennan's "Creative Works Orchestra" and performed at the Willisau Jazz Festival. She returned to Switzerland in 1991 performing in Brennan's "SinFONietta" at the Lucerne Festival.

Cooper released two collections of her contemporary dance pieces Schrödinger's Cat and An Angel on the Bridge in 1991 and performed her own composition "Concerto for Sopranino Saxophone and Strings" at the British Conservatory in London in 1992, a piece commissioned by the European Women's Orchestra. She also wrote and performed "Songs for Bassoon and Orchestra" with the Bologna Opera House Orchestra in Italy in 1992, and composed "Face in a Crowd" and "Can of Worms" for the San Francisco-based Rova Saxophone Quartet.

=== Illness and death ===
Cooper became aware that she had multiple sclerosis in the "late days" of Henry Cow, but did not disclose this fact to the musical community and continued performing right up until the late 1990s when the illness forced her to retire. In spite of this, Cooper remained a highly respected and influential figure in the musical world. Her works are regularly performed and even taught throughout the world. Cooper died from the illness on 18 September 2013, aged 62. A statement from Chris Cutler said that Cooper had contracted pneumonia.

=== Legacy ===
In June 2014, it was announced that Henry Cow, Music for Films, News from Babel and Oh Moscow would all be reforming to play Lindsay Cooper's music at two concerts: one at the Barbican Centre, London on 21 November 2014 as part of the EFG London Jazz Festival; and the other at the Lawrence Batley Theatre, Huddersfield on 22 November 2014 as part of the Huddersfield Contemporary Music Festival (hcmf// 2014). A third remembrance concert for Cooper featuring the same line-up above was held in Forlì, Italy on 23 November 2014. In a review of the Barbican concert on 21 November, Dom Lawson called it "a fitting salute to Cooper's life", adding "what tonight's experience never becomes is self‑indulgent: there's a sharpness to the intricate arrangements as very obvious waves of passion and commitment from everyone on stage flow and spread across the auditorium."

In November 2014, ReR Megacorp released a double CD Lindsay Cooper: Rarities | Volumes 1 & 2, a collection of unreleased and limited released tracks.

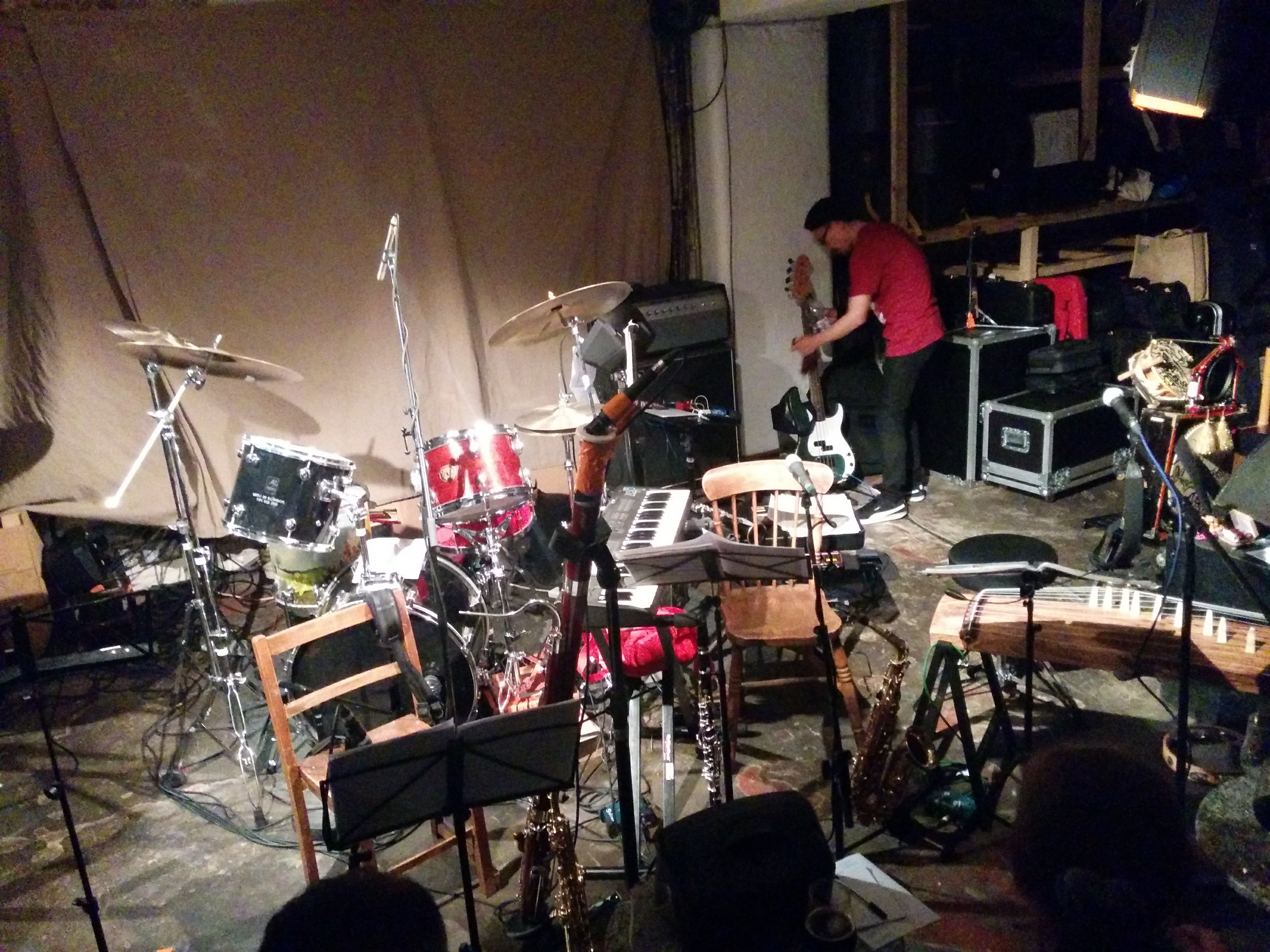
Bassist Nasuno Mitsuru preparing before the second set of a live performance by the band Half the Sky on 22 June 2017 in London.

In 2015, Half the Sky, a band formed by Yumi Hara and Cooper's former Henry Cow bandmate Chris Cutler to play her music, principally pieces for News from Babel and Henry Cow. The band has performed in Japan, France, the UK and Germany.

== Discography ==
=== Solo albums ===
- Rags (1981, LP, Arc Records, UK)
- The Golddiggers (1983, LP, Recommended Records, UK) – original soundtrack to the film The Gold Diggers by Sally Potter
- Music for Other Occasions (1986, LP, No Man's Land, Germany)
- Oh Moscow (1991, CD, Victo Records, Canada)
- An Angel on the Bridge (1991, CD, Phonogram/Australian Broadcasting Corporation, Australia)
- Schroedinger's Cat (1991, CD, Line/Femme Music, Germany)
- Sahara Dust (1993, CD, Intakt Records, Switzerland)
- A View from the Bridge (1998, 2xCD, Impetus Records, UK)

==== Compilation albums ====
- Rags / The Golddiggers (1991, CD, ReR Megacorp, UK) – includes Rags and most of The Golddiggers
- Rarities Volumes 1 & 2 (2014, 2xCD, Recommended Records, UK) – posthumous compilation of previously released rarities and previously unreleased material

=== Band and collaborative albums ===
With Mike Oldfield

- Hergest Ridge (1974, LP, Virgin Records, UK)

With Egg

- The Civil Surface (1974, LP, Caroline Records, UK)

With Henry Cow

- Unrest (1974, LP, Virgin Records, UK)
- Concerts (1976, 2xLP, Caroline Records, UK)
- Western Culture (1979, LP, Broadcast, UK)
- The Virgin Years – Souvenir Box (1991, 3xCD, East Side Digital Records, US)
- Henry Cow Box (2006, 7xCD, Recommended Records, UK)
- Stockholm & Göteborg (2008, CD, Recommended Records, UK)
- The 40th Anniversary Henry Cow Box Set (2009, 9xCD+DVD, Recommended Records, UK)
- The Henry Cow Box Redux: The Complete Henry Cow (2019, 17xCD+DVD, Recommended Records, UK)

With Slapp Happy/Henry Cow

- Desperate Straights (1975, LP, Virgin Records, UK)
- In Praise of Learning (1975, LP, Virgin Records, UK)

With Comus

- To Keep from Crying (1974, LP, Virgin Records, UK) – recorded after Cooper left the group, with her appearing as a guest
- Out of the Coma (2012, CD, Coptic Cat, UK) – featuring Cooper's earliest known recording, a live performance from 1972

With Steve Hillage

- Fish Rising (1975, LP, Virgin Records, UK)

With Hatfield and the North

- The Rotters' Club (1975, LP, Virgin Records, UK)

With Art Bears

- Hopes and Fears (1978, LP, Recommended Records, UK)

With Feminist Improvising Group

- Feminist Improvising Group (1979, Cassette, UK)

With Mike Westbrook

- The Cortège (Original Records, 1982)
- Westbrook-Rossini (hat ART, 1987)
- Westbrook-Rossini, Zürich Live 1986 (hat ART, 1986 [1994])

With Chris Cutler, Bill Gilonis, Tim Hodgkinson and Robert Wyatt

- The Last Nightingale (1984, LP, Recommended Records, UK)

With News from Babel

- Work Resumed on the Tower (1984, LP, Recommended Records, UK)
- Letters Home (1986, LP, Recommended Records, UK)

With David Thomas and the Pedestrians

- Winter Comes Home (1983, LP, Recommended Records, UK)
- Variations on a Theme (1983, LP, Rough Trade Records, UK)
- More Places Forever (1985, LP, Rough Trade Records, UK)

With Maggie Nicols and Joëlle Léandre

- Live at the Bastille (1982) (1984, LP, Recommended Records, UK)

With Catherine Jauniaux and Tim Hodgkinson

- Fluvial (1984, LP, Woof Records, UK)

With Dagmar Krause

- Tank Battles: The Songs of Hanns Eisler (1988, LP, Island Records, UK)
- Panzerschlacht: Die Lieder von Hanns Eisler (1988, LP, Island Records, UK)

With Anthony Phillips and Harry Williamson

- Tarka (1988, CD, Baillemont Records, France)

With John Wolf Brennan

- Creative Works Orchestra: Live in Willisau & More (1991, CD, Creative Works Records, Switzerland)
- I.N.I.T.I.A.L.S.: Sources Along the Songlines (2005, CD, Creative Works Records, Switzerland)

With David Motion and Sally Potter

- Orlando (1993, CD, Varèse Sarabande, US) – original soundtrack to the film Orlando by Sally Potter

With Trio Trabant a Roma

- State of Volgograd (1994, CD, Free Music Production, Germany)

With Tim Hodgkinson

- Each in Our Own Thoughts (1994, CD, Woof Records, UK)

With Charles Gray

- Pia Mater (1997, CD, Resurgence, UK)

With Rova Saxophone Quartet

- Bingo (1998, CD, Victo Records, Canada) – composer

With The Orckestra

- "Unreleased Orckestra Extract" (3" CD single, 2006, Recommended Records, UK)

With Fred Frith, Lars Hollmer and Gianni Gebbia

- Angels on the Edge of Time (2015, CD, I Dischi di Angelica, Italy) – recorded at the 1992 Angelica Festival
