= Phil Minton =

British avant-garde jazz/free-improvising vocalist and trumpeter (born 1940)

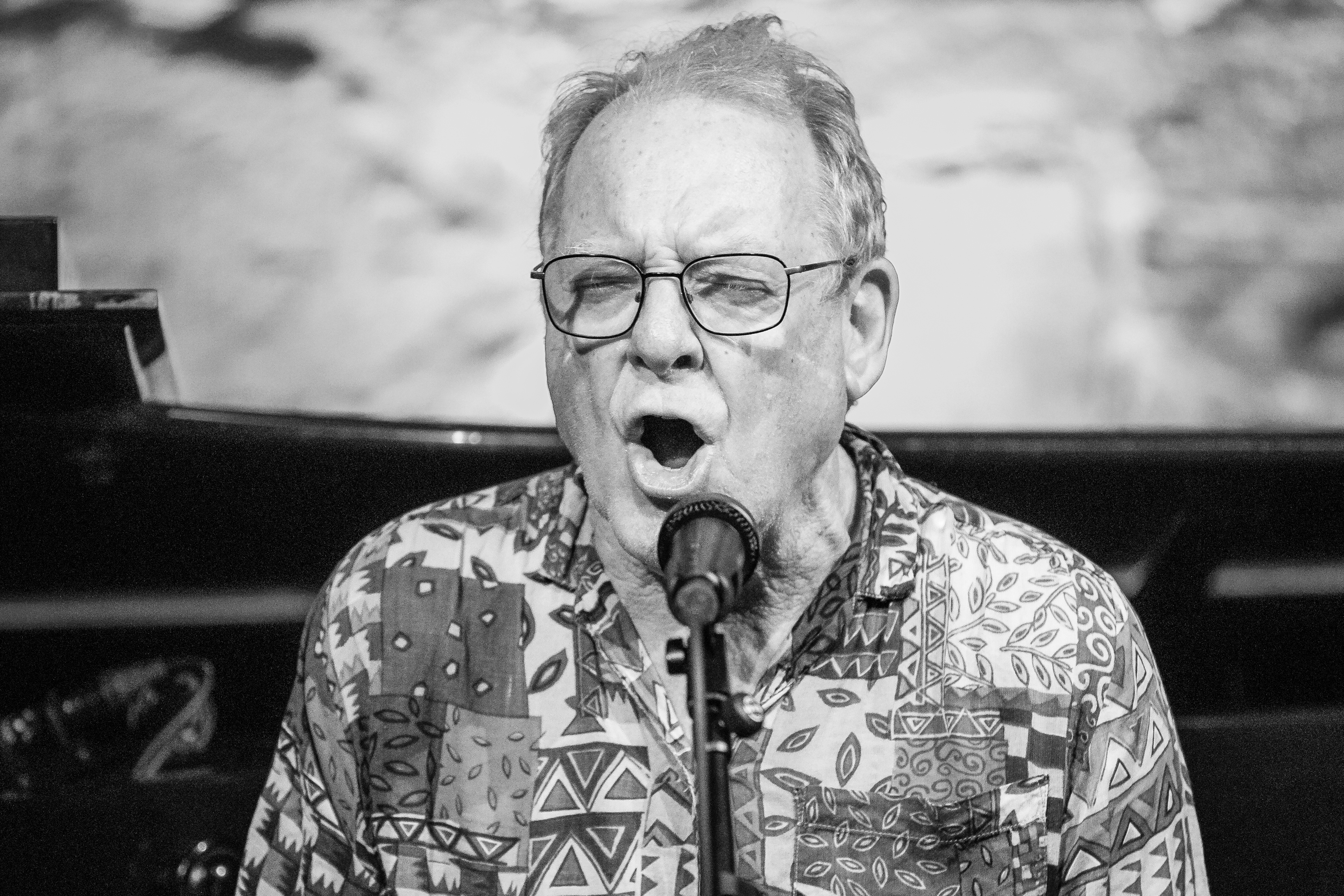
- Minton performing at the Kongsberg Jazzfestival, 2024

Background information
- Born: 2 November 1940 (age 85); Torquay, England
- Genres: Free improvisation, avant-garde jazz
- Occupation: Musician
- Instruments: Vocals, trumpet
- Years active: 1969–present
- Labels: Emanem, FMP
- Website: philminton.co.uk

Phil Minton (born 2 November 1940) is a British avant-garde jazz/free-improvising vocalist and trumpeter.

Minton is a highly dramatic baritone who tends to specialize in literary texts: he has sung lyrics by William Blake with Mike Westbrook's group, Daniil Kharms and Joseph Brodsky with Simon Nabatov, and extracts from James Joyce's Finnegans Wake with his own ensemble. He sings on a Jimi Hendrix tribute album, belting out the lyrics in over-the-top fashion. Between 1987 and 1993 Minton toured Europe, North America, and Russia with Lindsay Cooper's Oh Moscow ensemble.

He is perhaps best known, however, for his completely free-form work, which involves "extended techniques" that can be as unsettling as they can be mesmerising. His vocals often include the sounds of retching, burping, screaming, and gasping, as well as childlike muttering, whining, crying and humming; he also has an ability to distort his vocal cords to produce two notes at once. As the DJ/poet Kenneth Goldsmith has described it,

Minton's range on this disc (A Doughnut in One Hand) runs from the sounds of a man choking on his own vomit to the sounds that grandpa makes when you finally decide to pull the plug on his respirator. Minton's like a little kid who's contact-miked himself playing yo-yo with his saliva; he's a baby drooling through his cries; he's mastered the art of the multiple burp; he's perfected the craft of goobering all over his finger and then running it over his lips while moaning. I'd hate to see what his mic looked like after he was done with it. ... Minton ... forces us to ponder the musical qualities of noises that we'd rather not deal with and for that fact alone, makes this an important recording.

Minton has worked with most of the improvising musicians in the European scene, but his most frequent improvising companions are the pianist Veryan Weston and the percussionist Roger Turner; Minton and Turner perform as a duo in the 1993 opera Agamemnon.

Minton also sang in the soundtrack to the 2025 film The Testament of Ann Lee, alongside Josephine Foster, Shelley Hirsch, Maggie Nicols, Alan Sparhawk, and others.

== Discography ==
- A Doughnut in Both Hands (Rift, 1981)
- Voice of America with Fred Frith, Bob Ostertag (Rift, 1982)
- Ways with Veryan Weston (ITM, 1987)
- The Berlin Station (FMP, 1988)
- Mouthful of Ecstasy (Les Disques Victo, 1996)
- My Chelsea with Noel Akchote, Lol Coxhill (Rectangle, 1997)
- Two Concerts (FMP, 1998)
- A Doughnut in One Hand (FMP, 1998)
- Apples of Gomorrah with John Butcher (GROB, 2002)
- Mopomoso Solos 2002 with Chris Burn, Lol Coxhill (Emanem, 2004)
- Five Men Singing (Les Disques Victo, 2004)
- Constant Comments with Fred Van Hove (FMR, 2005)
- The Enigma Carols (Recorded, 2005)
- Scatter with Pat Thomas (FMR, 2007)
- Tasting with Sophie Agnel (Another Timbre, 2007)
- Slur (Emanem, 2007)
- No Doughnuts in Hand (Emanem, 2008)
- Midhopestones with Michel Doneda (Another Timbre, 2009)
- Fragments of the Cadastre with Michel Doneda (Another Timbre, 2010)
- Anicca (Dancing Wayang, 2011)
- The Knowledge of Its Own Making with Simon Fell (Huddersfield Contemporary, 2014)
- A Doughnut's End (Fataka, 2015)
- Leandre – Minton (Fou, 2017)
- Say Yes. Till No. (Neos, 2018)
- Ductus Pneumaticus with Torsten Muller (WhirrbooM! 2018)
- Blasphemious Fragments (Rastascan, 2019)

With the Tony Oxley Celebration Orchestra

- The Enchanted Messenger (Soul Note, 1995)

With Mike Westbrook

- Plays for the Record (Transatlantic, 1976)
- Goose Sauce (Original, 1978)
- Mama Chicago (RCA, 1979)
- Bright as Fire (Original, 1980)
- The Paris Album (Polydor, 1981)
- The Cortège (Original, 1982)
- On Duke's Birthday (hat Art, 1985)
- Off Abbey Road (Enja, 1990)
