= Henry Cow discography =

- Henry Cow performing in 1975
- Studio albums: 5
- Live albums: 2
- Box sets: 4
- Other albums: 5

The Henry Cow discography is a list of officially released recordings by English avant-rock group Henry Cow. (Note: Over ten bootleg recordings of Henry Cow music have been released. Later, many of these recordings were cleaned up and released on The 40th Anniversary Henry Cow Box Set.) During their period of activity from 1968 to 1978, they released six albums, including two with German/English avant-pop trio Slapp Happy, and one double live album.

The album Hopes and Fears (1978) was credited to the Art Bears but has been described as "the lost Henry Cow album". Hopes and Fears was originally recorded as a Henry Cow album, but when some of the band members were unhappy about the predominance of song-oriented material over instrumentals, it was released under the Art Bears name.

In 2006 Recommended Records, founded by Henry Cow drummer Chris Cutler. released a 7-CD box set, the Henry Cow Box comprising CD remasters of the original six albums. In 2009, to mark the anniversary of the formation of Henry Cow, Recommended Records released a 9-CD plus one DVD box set, The 40th Anniversary Henry Cow Box Set that contained previously unreleased recordings made between 1972 and 1978. The DVD, a 75-minute video of Henry Cow performing in Vevey, Switzerland in August 1976, is the only known video recording of the band.

In 2019, to mark Henry Cow's 50th anniversary, Recommended Records released The Henry Cow Box Redux: The Complete Henry Cow, an 17-CD plus one DVD box set containing all officially released recordings of the band.

| * | Indicates the six albums Henry Cow made during their existence. |

== Studio albums ==
| Year | Title | Format | Label | Released | Notes |
|---|---|---|---|---|---|
| 1973 | Legend * (Note: Legend is also known as The Henry Cow Legend and Leg End.) | LP | Virgin (UK) | September 1973 | |
| 1974 | Unrest * | LP | Virgin (UK) | May 1974 | |
| 1975 | Desperate Straights * | LP | Virgin (UK) | March 1975 | Collaborative album with Slapp Happy. |
| 1975 | In Praise of Learning * | LP | Virgin (UK) | May 1975 | Collaborative album with Slapp Happy. |
| 1979 | Western Culture * | LP | Broadcast (UK) | 1979 | |

== Live albums ==
| Year | Title | Format | Label | Released | Notes |
|---|---|---|---|---|---|
| 1976 | Concerts * | 2xLP | Compendium (Norway) | 1976 | |
| 2008 | Stockholm & Göteborg | CD | Recommended (UK) | September 2008 | Part of The 40th Anniversary Henry Cow Box Set, released separately in advance of the box set's release. |

== Box sets ==
| Year | Title | Format | Label | Released | Notes |
|---|---|---|---|---|---|
| 1991 | The Virgin Years – Souvenir Box: Legend; Unrest; In Praise of Learning | 3xCD | East Side Digital (US) | 1991 | Contains re-mixed versions of Henry Cow's three albums released on Virgin Records, including four previously unreleased bonus tracks, a 24 page booklet and a Henry Cow fold-out family tree. |
| 2006 | Henry Cow Box: Leg End; Unrest; Desperate Straights; In Praise of Learning; Concerts (2xCD); Western Culture; Bonus 3" CD-single: "Unreleased Orckestra Extract" | 7xCD | Recommended (UK) | December 2006 | Contains the six original Henry Cow albums released between 1973 and 1979; Concerts includes Henry Cow's Greasy Truckers Live at Dingwalls Dance Hall set; bonus mini CD by the Orckestra given to advance subscribers of the box set. |
| 2009 | The 40th Anniversary Henry Cow Box Set: The Road: Volumes 1–5; Vol. 1: Beginnings; Vol. 2: 1974–5; Vol. 3: Hamburg; Vol. 4–5: Trondheim (2xCD); The Road: Volumes 6–10; Vol. 6: Stockholm & Göteborg; Vol. 7: Later and Post-Virgin; Vol. 8: Bremen; Vol. 9: Late; Vol. 10: Vevey 1976 (DVD); Bonus CD: A Cow Cabinet of Curiosities | 10xCD + 1xDVD | Recommended (UK) | January 2009 | Contains previously unreleased and mostly live recordings made between 1972 and 1978; bonus CD given to advance subscribers of the box set. In March 2017 Volumes 1 to 5 and 7 to 10, and the bonus CD released by Recommended as freestanding albums; Volume 6 previously released separately in September 2008. |
| 2019 | The Henry Cow Box Redux: The Complete Henry Cow: Vol. 1: Leg End; Vol. 2: Unrest; Vol. 3: Desperate Straights; Vol. 4: In Praise of Learning; Vol. 5: Western Culture; Vol. 6–7: Concerts (2xCD); Vol. 8: Beginnings; Vol. 9: 1974–5; Vol. 10: Hamburg; Vol. 11–12: Trondheim (2xCD); Vol. 13: Stockholm & Goteborg; Vol. 14: Later and Post-Virgin; Vol. 15: Bremen; Vol. 16: Late; Vol. 17: Vevey 1976 (DVD); Vol. 18: A Cow Cabinet of Curiosities; Bonus CD: Ex Box – Collected Fragments 1971–1978; Vol. 20: Glastonbury and Elsewhere ^{*} | 19xCD + 1xDVD | Recommended (UK) | October 2019 | Contains the contents of the 2006 and 2009 box sets (excluding the 2006 bonus CD-single: "Unreleased Orckestra Extract", and including the 2009 bonus CD: A Cow Cabinet of Curiosities), plus an extra bonus CD: Ex Box – Collected Fragments 1971–1978, comprising newly recovered and previously unreleased recordings given to advance subscribers of the 2019 box set. The 2006 bonus CD-single: "Unreleased Orckestra Extract" appears as two tracks ("Untitled" and "Would You Prefer Us To Lie") on the 2019 bonus CD: Ex Box – Collected Fragments 1971–1978.^{*} Vol. 20 was released in December 2022 and is a supplement to The Henry Cow Box Redux; it contains additional unreleased material uncovered after the release of the box set in 2019. |

== Other albums ==
Albums with, or by, other artists containing previously unreleased Henry Cow tracks.

| Year | Title | Format | Label | Released | Notes |
|---|---|---|---|---|---|
| 1973 | Various artists: Greasy Truckers Live at Dingwalls Dance Hall | 2xLP | Caroline (UK) | 1973 | Four tracks by Henry Cow; later released on the CD reissues of Concerts. |
| 1978 | Art Bears: Hopes and Fears | LP | Recommended (UK) | May 1978 | Nine tracks by Henry Cow; originally intended to be a Henry Cow album, but released under the name of Art Bears. |
| 1982 | Various artists: Recommended Records Sampler | 2xLP | Recommended (UK) | May 1982 | Two tracks by Henry Cow: "Slice" (a Western Culture outtake) and "Viva Pa Ubu" (a Hopes and Fears outtake); later released as bonus tracks on the 2001 CD reissue of Western Culture. |
| 1984 | Various artists: The Last Nightingale | LP | Recommended (UK) | November 1984 | One track by Henry Cow: "Bittern Storm Revisited" (a remix of "Bittern Storm over Ülm" from Unrest). |
| 1990 | Fred Frith: Gravity | CD | RecRec Music (Switzerland) | 1990 | One track by Henry Cow: "Waking Against Sleep" (a Western Culture outtake); not released anywhere else. (Note: It has been reported that "Waking Against Sleep" on this reissue of Gravity may be the same recording as "The Herring People" on The 40th Anniversary Henry Cow Box Set. See the song notes and this talk page.) |
