= Henry Cow Box =

Box set by Henry Cow
- Released: December 2006
- Recorded: 1973–1978
- Genre: Avant-rock
- Length: 329:47
- Label: Recommended (UK)
- Producer: Henry Cow and others

Henry Cow chronology
The Virgin Years – Souvenir Box (1991)	Henry Cow Box (2006)	Stockholm & Göteborg (2008)

Henry Cow Box is a seven-CD limited edition (Note: 200 copies, box set liner notes.) box set by English avant-rock group Henry Cow. It was released in December 2006 by Recommended Records and comprises the six original albums Henry Cow released between 1973 and 1979, including those recorded with Slapp Happy. A bonus 3" CD-single was given to advance subscribers of the box set which contains previously unreleased material taken from live performances in Europe by the Orckestra, a merger of Henry Cow, the Mike Westbrook Brass Band and folk singer Frankie Armstrong in 1977. The two bonus CD Orckestra tracks were later reissued on the 2019 Henry Cow Box Redux: The Complete Henry Cow bonus CD, Ex Box – Collected Fragments 1971–1978.

The CDs featured here are the 1998 to 2006 reissues by Recommended Records and contain the original LP mixes. (Remixed versions of Legend and In Praise of Learning were issued in 1991 by East Side Digital Records.) Concerts and Western Culture include the bonus tracks present on their respective CD reissues. The box set's album covers are CD-sized cardboard replicas of the original LP covers.

== Cover art ==
The album cover art work was by artist Ray Smith and was originally used on Henry Cow's debut album, Legend (1973).

== Track listings ==
=== Disc 1: Legend ===
Contains all the tracks (the US/Japanese vinyl mixes) from the Henry Cow LP Legend (1973).

No.	Title	Writer(s)	Length
1.	"Nirvana for Mice"	Fred Frith	4:53
2.	"Amygdala"	Tim Hodgkinson	6:47
3.	"Teenbeat Introduction"	Henry Cow	4:32
4.	"Teenbeat"	Frith, John Greaves	6:57
5.	"Extract from 'With the Yellow Half-Moon and Blue Star'"	Frith	3:37
6.	"Teenbeat Reprise"	Frith	5:07
7.	"The Tenth Chaffinch"	Henry Cow	6:06
8.	"Nine Funerals of the Citizen King"	Hodgkinson	5:34

=== Disc 2: Unrest ===
Contains all the tracks from the Henry Cow LP Unrest (1974).

No.	Title	Writer(s)	Length
1.	"Bittern Storm over Ulm"	Fred Frith	2:44
2.	"Half Asleep; Half Awake"	John Greaves	7:39
3.	"Ruins"	Frith	12:00
4.	"Solemn Music"	Frith	1:09
5.	"Linguaphonie"	Henry Cow	5:58
6.	"Upon Entering the Hotel Adlon"	Henry Cow	2:56
7.	"Arcades"	Henry Cow	1:50
8.	"Deluge"	Henry Cow	5:52

=== Disc 3: Desperate Straights ===
Contains all the tracks from the Slapp Happy/Henry Cow LP Desperate Straights (1975).

No.	Title	Writer(s)	Length
1.	"Some Questions about Hats"	Anthony Moore, Peter Blegvad	1:49
2.	"The Owl"	Moore	2:14
3.	"A Worm Is at Work"	Moore, Blegvad	1:52
4.	"Bad Alchemy"	John Greaves, Blegvad	3:06
5.	"Europa"	Moore, Blegvad	2:48
6.	"Desperate Straights"	Moore	4:14
7.	"Riding Tigers"	Blegvad	1:43
8.	"Apes in Capes"	Moore	2:14
9.	"Strayed"	Blegvad	1:53
10.	"Giants"	Moore, Blegvad	1:57
11.	"Excerpt from The Messiah"	George Frideric Handel, arr. Blegvad	1:48
12.	"In the Sickbay"	Dagmar Krause, Blegvad	2:08
13.	"Caucasian Lullaby"	Chris Cutler, Moore	8:20

=== Disc 4: In Praise of Learning ===
Contains all the tracks (the original mixes) from the Henry Cow/Slapp Happy LP In Praise of Learning (1975).

No.	Title	Writer(s)	Length
1.	"War"	Anthony Moore, Peter Blegvad	2:25
2.	"Living in the Heart of the Beast"	Tim Hodgkinson	15:30
3.	"Beginning: The Long March"	Henry Cow, Slapp Happy	6:26
4.	"Beautiful as the Moon – Terrible as an Army with Banners"	Fred Frith, Chris Cutler	7:02
5.	"Morning Star"	Henry Cow, Slapp Happy	6:05

=== Discs 5 and 6: Concerts ===
Contains all the tracks from the Henry Cow double LP (with Robert Wyatt) Concerts (1976), plus the Henry Cow tracks on the double LP Greasy Truckers Live at Dingwalls Dance Hall (1973).

Disc 5
No.	Title	Writer(s)	Length
1.	"Beautiful as the Moon – Terrible as an Army with Banners"	Fred Frith, Chris Cutler	5:41
2.	"Nirvana for Mice"	Frith	5:30
3.	"Ottawa Song"	Frith, Cutler	4:16
4.	"Gloria Gloom"	Robert Wyatt, Bill MacCormick	4:14
5.	"Beautiful as the Moon (Reprise)"	Frith, Cutler	3:11
6.	"Bad Alchemy"	John Greaves, Peter Blegvad	2:55
7.	"Little Red Riding Hood Hits the Road"	Wyatt	5:50
8.	"Ruins"	Frith	16:29
9.	"Groningen"	Tim Hodgkinson, Henry Cow	8:54
10.	"Groningen Again"	Henry Cow	7:27

Disk 6
No.	Title	Writer(s)	Length
1.	"Oslo": 1. "Part 1"; 2. "Part 2"; 3. "Part 3"; 4. "Part 4"; 5. "Part 5"; 6. "Part 6"; 7. "Part 7"; 8. "Part 8"	Henry Cow	29:00 5:38 3:16 3:24 3:01 3:00 1:45 4:55 4:01
9.	"Off the Map": "Solo Piano"; "Trio"	Hodgkinson, Cutler, Frith Hodgkinson Hodgkinson, Cutler, Frith	8:23
10.	"Café Royal" (solo guitar)	Frith	3:20
11.	"Keeping Warm in Winter"	Frith, Greaves	1:00
12.	"Sweet Heart of Mine"	Henry Cow	8:58
13.	"Udine"	Henry Cow	9:39

=== Disc 7: Western Culture ===
Contains all the tracks from the Henry Cow LP Western Culture (1979).

History and Prospects
No.	Title	Writer(s)	Recorded	Length
1.	"Industry"	Tim Hodgkinson	26 July – 8 August 1978	6:58
2.	"The Decay of Cities"	Hodgkinson	26 July – 8 August 1978	6:55
3.	"On the Raft"	Hodgkinson	26 July – 8 August 1978	4:01

Day by Day
No.	Title	Writer(s)	Recorded	Length
4.	"Falling Away"	Lindsay Cooper	26 July – 8 August 1978	7:38
5.	"Gretels Tale"	Cooper	26 July – 8 August 1978	3:58
6.	"Look Back"	Cooper	26 July – 8 August 1978	1:19
7.	"½ the Sky"	Cooper, Hodgkinson	15–29 January 1978	5:14

Bonus tracks
No.	Title	Writer(s)	Recorded	Length
8.	Untitled (silence only)			1:29
9.	"Viva Pa Ubu"	Hodgkinson	15–29 January 1978	4:28
10.	"Look Back (alt)"	Cooper	26 July – 8 August 1978	1:21
11.	"Slice"	Cooper	26 July – 8 August 1978	0:36

=== Bonus 3" CD-single: "Unreleased Orckestra Extract" ===
Contains previously unreleased material taken from live performances in Europe by the Orckestra in March–May 1978. Given to advance subscribers of the box set.

No.	Title	Writer(s)	Length
1.	Untitled	Fred Frith	3:40
2.	"Would You Prefer Us to Lie?"	Chris Cutler, John Greaves	8:03

== Personnel ==
=== Henry Cow ===
- Fred Frith – guitars, violin, viola, xylophone, piano, voice
- Tim Hodgkinson – organ, piano, alto saxophone, clarinet, Hawaiian guitar, voice
- John Greaves – bass guitar, piano, voice
- Chris Cutler – drums, piano, voice
- Geoff Leigh – saxophones, flute, clarinet, recorder, voice
- Lindsay Cooper – bassoon, flute, oboe, soprano saxophone, sopranino recorder, piano, voice
- Dagmar Krause – voice, piano
- Georgie Born – bass guitar

=== Slapp Happy ===
- Dagmar Krause – voice
- Peter Blegvad – guitar, voice, clarinet
- Anthony Moore – piano, electronics and tapework

=== The Orckestra ===
- Henry Cow
  - Fred Frith – guitar
  - Tim Hodgkinson – organ, alto saxophone
  - Chris Cutler – drums
  - Lindsay Cooper – bassoon
  - Dagmar Krause – vocals
  - Georgie Born – bass guitar
- Mike Westbrook Brass Band
  - Mike Westbrook – piano
  - Kate Westbrook – euphonium
  - Dave Chambers – soprano saxophone
  - Paul Rutherford – trombone
  - Phil Minton – vocals, trumpet
- Frankie Armstrong – vocals

== See also ==
- The 40th Anniversary Henry Cow Box Set (2009)
