= The Virgin Years – Souvenir Box =

Box set by Henry Cow
- Released: 1991
- Recorded: 1973–1975, 1990
- Genre: Avant-rock
- Length: 142:19
- Label: Recommended (UK); East Side Digital (US)
- Producer: Henry Cow and others

Henry Cow chronology
Western Culture (1979)	The Virgin Years – Souvenir Box (1991)	Henry Cow Box (2006)

The Virgin Years – Souvenir Box is a three-CD limited-edition box set by English avant-rock group Henry Cow. It was released in 1991 by Recommended Records and East Side Digital Records, and contains three albums Henry Cow made for Virgin Records between 1973 and 1975: Legend, Unrest and In Praise of Learning. Included in the box set is a 24-page souvenir booklet and a Henry Cow fold-out family tree.

== Track listings ==
The CDs in this box set are as released by East Side Digital Records in 1991, which include bonus tracks and remixed versions of Legend and In Praise of Learning.

=== Disc 1: Legend ===
No.	Title	Writer(s)	Length
1.	"Nirvana for Mice"	Fred Frith	4:53
2.	"Amygdala"	Tim Hodgkinson	6:47
3.	"Teenbeat Introduction"	Henry Cow	4:32
4.	"Teenbeat"	Frith, John Greaves	6:57
5.	"Nirvana for Mice (Reprise)"	Frith	1:11
6.	"Extract from 'With the Yellow Half-Moon and Blue Star'"	Frith	5:07
7.	"Teenbeat Reprise"	Frith	2:26
8.	"The Tenth Chaffinch"	Henry Cow	6:06
9.	"Nine Funerals of the Citizen King"	Hodgkinson	5:34
10.	"Bellycan"	Henry Cow	3:19

=== Disc 2: Unrest ===
No.	Title	Writer(s)	Length
1.	"Bittern Storm over Ulm"	Fred Frith	2:44
2.	"Half Asleep; Half Awake"	John Greaves	7:39
3.	"Ruins"	Frith	12:00
4.	"Solemn Music"	Frith	1:09
5.	"Linguaphonie"	Henry Cow	5:58
6.	"Upon Entering the Hotel Adlon"	Henry Cow	2:56
7.	"Arcades"	Henry Cow	1:50
8.	"Deluge"	Henry Cow	5:52
9.	"The Glove"	Henry Cow	6:35
10.	"Torch Fire"	Henry Cow	4:48

=== Disc 3: In Praise of Learning ===
No.	Title	Writer(s)	Length
1.	"War"	Anthony Moore, Peter Blegvad	2:25
2.	"Living in the Heart of the Beast"	Tim Hodgkinson	15:30
3.	"Beginning: The Long March"	Henry Cow, Slapp Happy	6:26
4.	"Beautiful as the Moon – Terrible as an Army with Banners"	Fred Frith, Chris Cutler	7:02
5.	"Morning Star"	Henry Cow, Slapp Happy	6:05
6.	"Lovers of Gold"	Henry Cow, Slapp Happy, Cutler	6:28

== Personnel ==
- Fred Frith – guitars, violin, viola, xylophone, piano, voice
- Tim Hodgkinson – organ, piano, alto saxophone, clarinet, voice
- John Greaves – bass guitar, piano, voice
- Chris Cutler – drums, piano, voice
- Geoff Leigh – saxophones, flute, clarinet, recorder, voice
- Lindsay Cooper – bassoon, oboe, recorder, voice
- Dagmar Krause – voice
- Peter Blegvad – guitar, voice, clarinet
- Anthony Moore – piano, electronics and tapework

== Remixes ==
Disc 1 is a remixed version of Legend by Tim Hodgkinson and Fred Frith at Cold Storage and Red Shop Studios in May/August 1990. The bonus track "Bellycan" is an outtake from Henry Cow's Greasy Truckers Live at Dingwalls Dance Hall recording session in November 1973.

Disc 2 was not remixed. The bonus tracks "Torchfire" and "The Glove" were derived from raw material recorded during the Unrest sessions, and were mixed by Hodgkinson at Cold Storage Studios in 1984. A remixed version of "Bittern Storm over Ulm" appears on limited-edition EP The Last Nightingale.

Disc 3 is a remixed version of In Praise of Learning by Frith, Hodgkinson and Martin Bisi at BC studios, New York in April 1985, and at Cold Storage studios by Hodgkinson. The bonus track "Lovers of Gold" is an alternate version of "Beginning: The Long March" created by Chris Cutler. It includes texts by Cutler and sung by Krause near the beginning.

== See also ==
- Henry Cow Box (2006)
- The 40th Anniversary Henry Cow Box Set (2009)
