= Concerts (Henry Cow album) =

Live album by Henry Cow
- Released: 1976
- Recorded: September 1974 – October 1975
- Venue: London, Italy, Netherlands, Norway
- Genre: Avant-rock; free improvisation
- Length: 103:43
- Label: Compendium (Norway); Caroline (UK)
- Producer: Henry Cow

Henry Cow chronology
In Praise of Learning (1975)	Concerts (1976)	Western Culture (1979)

Professional ratings
Review scores
Source	Rating
AllMusic	3.5/5 stars
All About Jazz	5/5 stars

Concerts is a live double album by English avant-rock group Henry Cow, recorded at concerts in London, Italy, the Netherlands and Norway between September 1974 and October 1975. Sides one and two of the LP record consist of composed material while sides three and four contain improvised pieces.

The album includes Henry Cow's last John Peel Session, recorded in August 1975, and extracts from a concert with Robert Wyatt at the New London Theatre in May 1975. "Groningen" (recorded in September 1974) is part of an instrumental suite where the band improvised around fragments of an early version of Tim Hodgkinson's "Living in the Heart of the Beast" from In Praise of Learning (1975). Another performance of this suite (in full) later appeared in Halsteren on Volume 2: 1974–5 of The 40th Anniversary Henry Cow Box Set (2009).

The album cover art was done by Henry Cow roadie and sound mixer Maggie Thomas. She created it from a collage she made out of a cut-up Henry Cow poster she had designed a few months earlier.

CD reissues of the album include Henry Cow's tracks on Greasy Truckers Live at Dingwalls Dance Hall (1973), a double LP of an October 1973 Dingwalls concert, featuring Camel, Henry Cow, Global Village Trucking Company and Gong.

== Concert venues and dates ==
- "Beautiful as the Moon – Terrible as an Army with Banners", "Nirvana for Mice", "Ottawa Song", "Gloria Gloom", "Beautiful as the Moon (Reprise)": Peel Session, BBC Maida Vale Studio 4, 5 August 1975; recorded and mixed by Bob Conduct and Tony Wilson; broadcast by the BBC, 18 August 1975.
- "Bad Alchemy", "Little Red Riding Hood Hits the Road": New London Theatre (with Robert Wyatt), 21 May 1975, mixed by Sarah Greaves.
- "Ruins", "Udine": Palamostre Auditorium, Udine, Italy, 13 October 1975, mixed by Neil Sandford, recorded by Sandro Pascolo.
- "Oslo": Høvikodden Arts Centre, Oslo, Norway, 25 July 1975, record and mixed by Jack Balchin and Harold Clark.
- "Groningen", "Groningen Again": Vera Club, Groningen, the Netherlands, 28 September 1974, mixed by Sarah Greaves.
- "Off the Map", "Cafe Royal", "Keeping Warm in Winter", "Sweet Heart of Mine": Greasy Truckers Live at Dingwalls Dance Hall, recorded at The Manor, 4 November 1973 by Henry Cow and Tom Newman (CD releases only).

== Composed material ==
The composed material (with the exception of "Ottawa Song") originally appeared on the following albums:

- Matching Mole: Matching Mole's Little Red Record (1972) – "Gloria Gloom"
- Henry Cow: Legend (1973) – "Nirvana for Mice"
- Henry Cow: Unrest (1974) – "Ruins"
- Robert Wyatt: Rock Bottom (1974) – "Little Red Riding Hood Hit the Road"
- Slapp Happy/Henry Cow: Desperate Straights (1975) – "Bad Alchemy"
- Henry Cow/Slapp Happy: In Praise of Learning (1975) – "Beautiful as the Moon – Terrible as an Army with Banners"

== CD reissues ==
In 1995, East Side Digital Records reissued Concerts as a double CD with four extra tracks. The extra tracks came from Greasy Truckers Live at Dingwalls Dance Hall (1973), a double LP of an October 1973 concert performed by Camel, Henry Cow, Global Village Trucking Company and Gong, each band contributing to one side of the double album. Henry Cow's contribution, however, was actually recorded a week later at The Manor Studios because a power failure at the event had delayed the start of the concert and a 2 am curfew reduced Henry Cow's set (billed last) to ten minutes. At the Manor, Henry Cow improvised their Greasy Truckers set to tape and mixed the tracks in a single session. An outtake from this recording session, "Bellycan" was released on the 1991 CD-release of Legend.

In October 2006, Recommended Records released a remastered version of Concerts, which included the Greasy Truckers set, on a double CD. The original dynamics of "Oslo" were restored, which had been compromised to fit it onto side three of the double LP. The remastering was done by Bob Drake in March 2006. An accompanying booklet included a 1977 interview with Henry Cow in Sweden, and a seven-day extract from the "November/December 1977 Road Diary" by Chris Cutler.

== Track listing ==
=== Original LP release ===
Side one
No.	Title	Writer(s)	Length
1.	"Beautiful as the Moon – Terrible as an Army with Banners"	Fred Frith, Chris Cutler
2.	"Nirvana for Mice"	Frith
3.	"Ottawa Song"	Frith, Cutler
4.	"Gloria Gloom"	Robert Wyatt, Bill MacCormick
5.	"Beautiful as the Moon (Reprise)"	Frith, Cutler
Total length:			22:50

Side two
No.	Title	Writer(s)	Length
6.	"Bad Alchemy"	John Greaves, Peter Blegvad
7.	"Little Red Riding Hood Hits the Road"	Wyatt
8.	"Ruins"	Frith
Total length:			25:36

Side three
No.	Title	Writer(s)	Length
9.	"Oslo"	Henry Cow
Total length:			29:02

Side four
No.	Title	Writer(s)	Length
10.	"Groningen"	Tim Hodgkinson, Henry Cow
11.	"Udine"	Henry Cow
12.	"Groningen Again"	Henry Cow
Total length:			26:15

=== 2006 double CD release ===
CD one
No.	Title	Writer(s)	Length
1.	"Beautiful as the Moon – Terrible as an Army with Banners"	Fred Frith, Chris Cutler	5:41
2.	"Nirvana for Mice"	Frith	5:30
3.	"Ottawa Song"	Frith, Cutler	4:16
4.	"Gloria Gloom"	Robert Wyatt, Bill MacCormick	4:14
5.	"Beautiful as the Moon (Reprise)"	Frith, Cutler	3:11
6.	"Bad Alchemy"	John Greaves, Peter Blegvad	2:55
7.	"Little Red Riding Hood Hits the Road"	Wyatt	5:50
8.	"Ruins"	Frith	16:29
9.	"Groningen"	Tim Hodgkinson, Henry Cow	8:54
10.	"Groningen Again"	Henry Cow	7:27
Total length:			64:27

CD two
No.	Title	Writer(s)	Length
1.	"Oslo": 1. "Part 1"; 2. "Part 2"; 3. "Part 3"; 4. "Part 4"; 5. "Part 5"; 6. "Part 6"; 7. "Part 7"; 8. "Part 8"	Henry Cow	29:00 5:38 3:16 3:24 3:01 3:00 1:45 4:55 4:01
9.	"Off the Map": "Solo Piano"; "Trio"	Hodgkinson, Cutler, Frith Hodgkinson Hodgkinson, Cutler, Frith	8:23
10.	"Café Royal" (solo guitar)	Frith	3:20
11.	"Keeping Warm in Winter"	Frith, Greaves	1:00
12.	"Sweet Heart of Mine"	Henry Cow	8:58
13.	"Udine"	Henry Cow	9:39
Total length:			60:19

2006 double CD release notes

- "Off the Map", "Café Royal", "Keeping Warm in Winter" and "Sweet Heart of Mine" are bonus tracks from Henry Cow's set on Greasy Truckers Live at Dingwalls Dance Hall (1973).

== Singles ==
- "In Concerto" (1977, 33⅓ rpm 7" single, Gong, Italy) – included with issue 4/4 of the Italian magazine, Gong
  1. "Beautiful as the Moon – Terrible as an Army with Banners" (Frith, Cutler)
  2. "Udine" (Henry Cow)

== Personnel ==
Henry Cow

- Lindsay Cooper (except Greasy Truckers set, CD release) – bassoon, flute, oboe, recorder, piano
- Chris Cutler – drums, piano
- Dagmar Krause – voice, piano
- Fred Frith – guitar, piano, violin, xylophone
- John Greaves – bass guitar, voice, celeste, piano
- Tim Hodgkinson – organ, clarinet, alto saxophone, piano (Greasy Truckers set, CD release only)
- Geoff Leigh (Greasy Truckers set, CD release only) – tenor and soprano saxophone, recorder, flute, clarinet

Guest musician

- Robert Wyatt – vocals ("Bad Alchemy" and "Little Red Riding Hood Hits the Road")

Production

- Henry Cow – producers
- Maggie Thomas – cover art
- David Vorhaus – original LP mastering (Kaleidophon, London)
- Bob Drake – CD remastering (Studio Midi Pyrenees, France)

== See also ==
- Henry Cow Box (2006)

== Works cited ==
- Cutler, Chris, ed. (2006). Concerts (CD booklet). Henry Cow. London: Recommended Records.
- Cutler, Chris, ed. (2019). "Book 1 | The Studio: Official Releases". The Henry Cow Box Redux: The Complete Henry Cow (box set booklet). Henry Cow. London: Recommended Records.
