= Legend (Henry Cow album) =

Studio album by Henry Cow
- Released: August 31, 1973
- Recorded: 12–17 May; 10–14 June 1973
- Studio: The Manor, Oxfordshire, England
- Genre: Experimental rock; progressive rock; avant-garde jazz
- Length: 43:33
- Label: Virgin (UK)
- Producer: Henry Cow

Henry Cow chronology
Legend (1973)	Unrest (1974)

The Henry Cow Legend (often referred to as Legend or Leg End (Note: The original LP release was entitled The Henry Cow Legend, with the name appearing only on the spine of the album cover. The 1991 CD edition was retitled Legend, and the 1998 original mix remastered CD edition was retitled Leg End.)) is the debut album of British avant-rock group Henry Cow. It was recorded at Virgin Records' Manor studios over three weeks in May and June 1973, mixed in July 1973, and released in September 1973.

== Content ==
With the exception of "Nine Funerals of the Citizen King", which the whole group sings, and background voices on "Nirvana for Mice" ("Sweet mystery of life I will remember"), "Teenbeat" and "The Tenth Chaffinch", this is an instrumental album. The jazzy Canterbury sound on some of the pieces shows Henry Cow's beginnings, although they quickly moved on to establish their own unique sound.

With the Yellow Half-Moon and Blue Star is a Fred Frith composition that was commissioned by the Cambridge Contemporary Dance Group under Liebe Klug, and was named after a painting by Paul Klee ("Avec la demi-lune jaune et l'étoile bleue"). Only an extract appears on this album, but the full 16-minute version of the suite is included in The 40th Anniversary Henry Cow Box Set (2009). Parts of "Teenbeat" began in With the Yellow Half-Moon and Blue Star and parts of it were later incorporated into "Ruins" on Unrest (1974). "Nirvana for Mice" was originally called "Nirvana for Moles" during Legend rehearsals, and later became "Nirvana for Rabbits" when performed live in Hamburg in March 1976.

Frith said that he used "chance methods" to compose "Nirvana for Mice" after reading works by American composer John Cage. King Crimson guitarist/vocalist Jakko Jakszyk remarked that in "Nirvana":

... there's a whole section in the middle where it goes into 21/8 and stays there. [Henry Cow] keep messing around with the bottom measure. They keep flipping from 5/8 and 5/4. But, it doesn't sound like the fusion stuff that was starting to happen ... This music sounded terribly organic. And when you stripped it back that was when you'd realize how complicated it was.

== Cover art ==
The album cover art work was by artist Ray Smith and was the first of three of his "paint socks" to feature on Henry Cow's albums. Smith had appeared with the band at several of their early 1970s concerts, performing a variety of activities, including ironing, reading text and miming with glove puppets. He suggested a woven sock on Legend's front cover, and insisted that the band's name should not appear there. Chris Cutler said in a 2011 interview that Smith continued the theme on Henry Cow's next two albums, with the sock changing "to suit the temper of the music".

In his book Prog Rock FAQ, Will Romano wrote that Legend "might [have] the most unusual and slightly amusing cover featuring a sock." Smith created it with a pastry bag that he used to squeeze out long strips of acrylic paint, which, once dry, he wove together to produce the sock. He explained that the sock has no connection to the music, "It's an independent object". Smith described the picture of the sock on the album cover as "clear, fresh and optimistic" which "suggest[s] something electrical".

The other two Henry Cow album covers to feature Smith's "socks" are Unrest (1974) and In Praise of Learning (1975). Legend's "sock" also features on the 2006 Henry Cow Box cover. Smith produced a cover for Henry Cow's final album, Western Culture, but it was not used. The design illustrated an industrial city viewed from above with the text "Henry Cow" appearing in its streets.

== CD reissues ==
In 1991 East Side Digital Records issued a remixed version (by Tim Hodgkinson, May/August 1990) of Legend on CD. Fred Frith collaborated with Hodgkinson on the remixes of "Nirvana for Mice" and "Teenbeat." The CD included a bonus track, "Bellycan", which was an outtake from Henry Cow's Greasy Truckers Live at Dingwalls Dance Hall recording session in November 1973. On the remix of "Amygdala", Lindsay Cooper, who was not yet a member of the group at the time of the LP recording, played bassoon (recorded August 1990) and replaced Geoff Leigh's saxophone, which Hodgkinson felt was "too jazzy". In addition to this, there were other radical mix changes (for instance, the closing vocals of "Nirvana for Mice" were mixed prominently in the original vinyl mix but are barely audible on the CD). The remixed versions of "Amygdala" and "Nine Funerals of the Citizen King" were later reissued on the 2019 Henry Cow Box Redux: The Complete Henry Cow bonus CD, Ex Box – Collected Fragments 1971–1978.

In 1998 Recommended Records and East Side Digital reissued Legend on CD with the original mixing restored and the bonus track omitted. With the original master tape having been lost, this CD edition was transferred from a mint condition Japanese vinyl copy.

== Reception ==
Professional ratings
Review scores
Source	Rating
AllMusic	4/5 stars
Christgau's Record Guide	B
Tom Hull – on the Web	B+

In a review at AllMusic, Mike DeGagne called Leg End a "busy musical trip" that produces some complicated yet interesting progressive rock. He said that while the "eclectic, avant garde-styled jazz movements" appear directionless, closer listening reveals some "first-rate instrumental fusion", although, DeGagne added, "a little too abstract at times".

Music journalist Robert Christgau said the music on The Henry Cow Legend is composed to stimulate improvisation, and is "more flexible" than King Crimson's, and "more stringently conceived" than Soft Machine's. He added that as often happens with this approach, "not everything works", but "you can listen to what few lyrics there are without getting sick".

== Track listing ==
=== Original 1973 release ===
Side one
No.	Title	Writer(s)	Length
1.	"Nirvana for Mice"	Fred Frith	4:53
2.	"Amygdala"	Tim Hodgkinson	6:47
3.	"Teenbeat Introduction"	Henry Cow	4:32
4.	"Teenbeat"	Frith, John Greaves	6:57

Side two
No.	Title	Writer(s)	Length
5.	"Extract from 'With the Yellow Half-Moon and Blue Star'"	Frith	3:37
6.	"Teenbeat Reprise"	Frith	5:07
7.	"The Tenth Chaffinch"	Henry Cow	6:06
8.	"Nine Funerals of the Citizen King"	Hodgkinson	5:34

=== 1991 CD release ===
No.	Title	Writer(s)	Length
1.	"Nirvana for Mice"	Frith	4:53
2.	"Amygdala"	Hodgkinson	6:47
3.	"Teenbeat Introduction"	H.Cow	4:32
4.	"Teenbeat"	Frith/Greaves	6:57
5.	"Nirvana Reprise"	Frith	1:11
6.	"Extract from 'With the Yellow Half-Moon and Blue Star'"	Frith	2:26
7.	"Teenbeat Reprise"	Frith	5:07
8.	"The Tenth Chaffinch"	H.Cow	6:06
9.	"Nine Funerals of the Citizen King"	Hodgkinson	5:34
10.	"Bellycan"	H.Cow	3:19

1991 CD release notes

- "Nirvana Reprise" is included in "Extract from 'With the Yellow Half-Moon and Blue Star'" on the LP and 1998 CD releases and not listed separately.
- "Bellycan" is a bonus track, and is an extract from Henry Cow's set on Greasy Truckers Live at Dingwalls Dance Hall (1973).

== Personnel ==
Henry Cow

- Geoff Leigh – saxophones, flute, clarinet, recorder, voice
- Tim Hodgkinson – Farfisa organ, piano, alto saxophone, clarinet, little bells, voice
- Fred Frith – guitars, violin, viola, piano, voice
- John Greaves – bass guitar, piano, whistle, voice
- Chris Cutler – drums, toys, piano, whistle, voice

Additional musicians

- Jeremy Baines – pixiphone on "Yellow Half-Moon"
- Sarah Greaves, Maggie Thomas and Cathy Williams – chorus on "Teenbeat"
- Lindsay Cooper – bassoon on remixed version of "Amygdala" (1991 CD re-issue only)

Production

- Tom Newman – recording engineer
- Mike Oldfield – recording engineer (first part of "Nirvana for Mice") (Note: When Henry Cow arrived at The Manor for their first recording session, the recording engineer, Tom Newman was "drunk under the console" after celebrating the completion of Mike Oldfield's Tubular Bells; Oldfield undertook the recording duties for the first session.)
- Henry Cow – producer
- Ray Smith – cover art

== See also ==
- The Virgin Years – Souvenir Box (1991)
- Henry Cow Box (2006)

== Works cited ==
- Cutler, Chris, ed. (2009). "The Road: Volumes 1–5". The 40th Anniversary Henry Cow Box Set (box set booklet). Henry Cow. London: Recommended Records.
- Piekut, Benjamin (2019). Henry Cow: The World Is a Problem. Duke University Press. ISBN 978-1-47800-405-9.
- Romano, Will (2014). Prog Rock FAQ: All That's Left To Know About Rock's Most Progressive Music (e-book ed.). Milwaukee, Wisconsin: Backbeat Books. ISBN 978-1-61713-587-3.
