= Teen Beat (disambiguation) =

Teen Beat was an American magazine for teenager readers, published from 1967 – c. 2007.

Teen Beat may also refer to:

- "Teen Beat" (song), a 1959 instrumental piece by Sandy Nelson
- "Teen Beat", a song by Fleetwood Mac from the box set 25 Years – The Chain
- "Teenbeat" (instrumental), a 1973 Henry Cow instrumental
- TeenBeat Records, an American independent record label
