= Teenbeat (instrumental) =

1973 instrumental written by Fred Frith and John Greaves for Henry Cow

"Teenbeat Introduction", "Teenbeat", "Teenbeat Reprise"

Instrumental by Henry Cow

from the album Legend
- Released: September 1973
- Recorded: May–June 1973
- Studio: The Manor, Oxfordshire, England
- Genre: Avant-rock
- Length: 4:32; 6:57; 5:07
- Label: Virgin
- Composers: "Teenbeat Introduction"; Henry Cow "Teenbeat"; Fred Frith, John Greaves "Teenbeat Reprise"; Fred Frith
- Producer: Henry Cow

"Teenbeat" is a 1973 suite of three instrumentals, "Teenbeat Introduction", "Teenbeat" and "Teenbeat Reprise", by the English avant-rock group Henry Cow. The three pieces were composed by Henry Cow, Fred Frith and John Greaves, and Fred Frith respectively. They were recorded in May and June 1973, and released on Henry Cow's debut album, Legend by Virgin Records in September 1973.

== Development ==
In 1970 Frith and Greaves began developing a piece that grew out of instrumental fragments and ideas the two had been working on. Henry Cow then experimented with these ideas to create "Teenbeat". Some of these fragments took on a life of their own and evolved into free-standing compositions. One of them was Frith's "With the Yellow Half-Moon and Blue Star", an extract of which appears on Legend; (Note: A performance of the complete "With the Yellow Half-Moon and Blue Star" was recorded on the John Peel Show on 17 October 1972, and appears on Volume 1: Beginnings in The 40th Anniversary Henry Cow Box Set.) the other was Frith's "Ruins", which was later released on Henry Cow's second album, Unrest. Glenn Kenny opined in Trouser Press that "Teenbeat"'s title, and the title of Frith's "Nirvana for Mice" (also from Legend), reflected Henry Cow's humour at the time.

Henry Cow began playing "Teenbeat" in 1971. Initial performances of the piece exploited its fragmented nature: elements were shuffled around and often interspaced with spells of open improvisation. On the John Peel Show in February 1972 an extended guitar solo by Frith and several free improvisation segments were added. Frith said the band "continued to mess with ['Teenbeat'] for years", and he called the piece "a beautiful living and breathing beast that was always fun to play and had all kinds of hidden subtleties."

Recordings of early versions of "Teenbeat" before its release on Legend appear on Volume 1: Beginnings in The 40th Anniversary Henry Cow Box Set. They are two undated rehearsals of the piece, and a 10-minute performance on the John Peel Show in February 1972.

The "Teenbeat" suite was recorded at The Manor in Oxfordshire, England in May–June 1973, and released on Henry Cow's first album, Legend in September 1973. It was later remixed by Tim Hodgkinson and Frith at Cold Storage Studios in London in May and August 1980, and released by East Side Digital Records on the first CD release of Legend in 1991. All subsequent CD releases of Legend by East Side Digital and Recommended Records restored the original mix.

== Composition and structure ==
The "Teenbeat" suit begins with "Teenbeat Introduction", a saxophone improvisation duet played by Hodgkinson and Geoff Leigh that leads on from Hodgkinson's "Amygdala" on Legend. About halfway through the track, the rest of the band joins in and it continues until the main "Teenbeat" piece begins. The music increases in intensity, augmented by a wordless chorus of Maggie Thomas, Sarah Greaves and Cathy Williams (three of Henry Cow's road crew), and culminates in "Teenbeat"'s opening tune.

Henry Cow use different metres simultaneously in "Teenbeat". 5/4 counterpoint sometimes features a 15/8 bassline. Benjamin Piekut wrote that "metrically ... [the piece] skitters all over the place" He described the composition's "winking 'dance' theme", which Frith, tongue-in-cheek, called "the inner core of the piece", as follows:

The snippet has the guitar and saxophone playing a melodic phrase of 10 beats, subdivided into 3 + 3 + 4; they sound this swinging tune three times, with the third extended via Cutler's drum fill into a full 12 beats before launching into the next section of the piece. Meanwhile, the bass plays a walking line in four straight 8-beat phrases that cycle independently from what's happening on top; on drums, Cutler accentuates this 4 + 4 feel rather than the 3 + 3 + 4 division in the melody. Taken together, these two parts traverse the same 32-beat interval of time, but segment it into smaller cycles in two different ways.

"Teenbeat" also features a number of fragments from other Frith and Greaves compositions. These include Frith's "With the Yellow Half-Moon and Blue Star" and "Came to See You", (Note: A performance of "Came to See You" was recorded on the John Peel Show on 28 February 1972, and appears on Volume 1: Beginnings in The 40th Anniversary Henry Cow Box Set.) plus tunes from Greaves's "Would You Prefer Us to Lie?" (Note: A performance of "Would You Prefer Us to Lie" was recorded in London on 13 February 1977, and appears on Volume 7: Later and Post-Virgin in The 40th Anniversary Henry Cow Box Set.) (played on the organ by Hodgkinson) and a piece that would later become "Kew. Rhone." (Note: The song "Kew. Rhone." was later recorded by Greaves and Peter Blegvad and released on their 1977 album, Kew. Rhone..) (played by Frith on guitar).

"Teenbeat Reprise" follows Frith's "Extract from 'With the Yellow Half-Moon and Blue Star'" on Legend. It begins with variations of themes used in "Teenbeat", then an extended guitar solo by Frith, which Udo Gerhards said brings to mind Robert Fripp's guitar work in King Crimson. Once again Henry Cow mixes their metres: for example, guitar chords playing at 1/4 are accompanied by the bass at 3/8. Towards the end of the track, the guitar solo winds down and is replaced by the "Teenbeat" tune on Frith's violin, after which, Piekut wrote, "the song wraps up quickly with a bounding bridge to nowhere."

== Reception and analysis ==
In a review of Legend in The Wire, Philip Clark wrote that the fanfare in "Teenbeat Introduction" "arrive[s] like a bucket of icy water". He said "Teenbeat" follows with "pointillistic splashes of sound" that become "a harmonically secure chorale", reaching a crescendo before "dissolv[ing] into a collage of rapidly looming jump-cuts". Sean Kitching referred to "Teenbeat" in The Quietus, as "uplifting and epic".

Bradley Smith wrote in The Billboard Guide to Progressive Rock that "Teenbeat", with its "ominous" drums and chorale that open the piece, and "Teenbeat Reprise", with its "raging" guitar solo, are some of the highlights of Legend. In a review of the album in the Anderson Herald in 1974, Michael Graham Main commented that "Teenbeat" and "Amygdala" give the album "a unique jazz-rock blend". He said Henry Cow "explodes with electrical energy" on "Teenbeat Reprise", and called it "the album's most developed number".

Paul Stump stated in The Music's All that Matters: A History of Progressive Rock that the placing of the organ and guitars in the stereo mix in the opening of "Teenbeat" is a good example of the "pointillist effect" Henry Cow achieved in many of their recordings. He suggested that Frith's "blistering and initially conventional-sounding" guitar solo in "Teenbeat Reprise" illustrates the band's incorporation of techniques they learnt from exploring their instruments while improvising. Stump added that the "irregular downbeats" of "Teenbeat Reprise"'s rhythm section "encourage[s] a harmonic elasticity".

== Live performances ==
"Teenbeat" was performed live by Henry Cow a number of times between 1971 and 1978, including:

- 28 February 1972 on the John Peel Show in London, broadcast by the BBC on 14 March 1972
  - Released in Volume 1: Beginnings of The 40th Anniversary Henry Cow Box Set
- 21 October 1973 at the Rainbow Theatre in London with a number of guests
- 9 June 1974 at the Theatre Royal in Sheffield, England while on tour with Captain Beefheart
  - Released on Ex Box – Collected Fragments 1971–1978, a bonus CD in The Henry Cow Box Redux: The Complete Henry Cow
- 13 February 1977 at the Wandsworth Town Hall, London
  - Released in Volume 7: Later and Post-Virgin in The 40th Anniversary Henry Cow Box Set
- May and June 1977 in Sweden and Southend-on-Sea, England
- 17 September 1977 with the Orckestra at Festival Nazionale dell’Unità in Modena, Italy
- 9 November 1977 in Bourges, France
- 16 December 1977 at Melkweg, Amsterdam
  - Released in Volume 7: Later and Post-Virgin in The 40th Anniversary Henry Cow Box Set
- 10 January 1978 in Geneva, Switzerland

== Works cited ==
- Cutler, Chris, ed. (2009). "The Road: Volumes 1–5". The 40th Anniversary Henry Cow Box Set (box set booklet). Henry Cow. London: Recommended Records.
- Piekut, Benjamin (2019). Henry Cow: The World Is a Problem. Duke University Press. ISBN 978-1-47800-405-9.
- Smith, Bradley (1997). The Billboard Guide to Progressive Music. New York: Billboard Books. ISBN 978-08-2307-665-9.
- Stump, Paul (2010). The Music's All that Matters: A History of Progressive Rock. Chelmsford, England: Harbour Books. ISBN 978-1-905128-10-5.
