= Living in the Heart of the Beast =

1975 avant-rock song written by Tim Hodgkinson for Henry Cow

Song by Henry Cow with Slapp Happy

from the album In Praise of Learning
- Released: 9 May 1975
- Recorded: February–March 1975
- Studio: The Manor, Oxfordshire, England
- Genre: Experimental rock; progressive rock
- Length: 16:18; 15:30 (remix)
- Label: Virgin
- Songwriter: Tim Hodgkinson
- Producers: Henry Cow, Slapp Happy, Phil Becque

"Living in the Heart of the Beast" is a 1975 song written by Tim Hodgkinson for the English avant-rock group Henry Cow. It was recorded in 1975 by Henry Cow with Slapp Happy, who had recently merged with Henry Cow after the two groups had recorded a collaborative album, Desperate Straights the previous year. The song was released on In Praise of Learning in May 1975 by Virgin Records. The song's title is a quote from the nineteenth-century Cuban poet and liberation fighter José Martí. "Living in the Heart of the Beast" was the first of two "epic" compositions Hodgkinson wrote for Henry Cow, the second being "Erk Gah" (1976), later known as "Hold to the Zero Burn, Imagine".

In 1986 "Living in the Heart of the Beast" inspired the title of the Kalahari Surfers' second album, Living in the Heart of the Beast. Former Henry Cow members Chris Cutler and Hodgkinson had toured with the South African band across Europe in the mid-1980s and Cutler's Recommended Records had released several of their albums. A jazz interpretation of "Living in the Heart of the Beast" was recorded by the Michel Edelin Quintet with spoken texts by John Greaves and released on their 2019 album, Echoes of Henry Cow.

== Development ==
Hodgkinson began writing "Living in the Heart of the Beast" in mid-1974 and presented it a few months later to Henry Cow as an unfinished and untitled instrumental. The group cut the piece up into fragments, interspaced them with improvisational sections, and performed it live. One such performance, Halsteren was recorded in Halsteren in the Netherlands on 26 September 1974, and appears in Volume 2: 1974–5 of The 40th Anniversary Henry Cow Box Set (2009). This instrumental suite was also performed in Groningen two days later, and part of it was released as "Groningen" on Concerts (1976). In early 1975, after a successful collaborative album, Desperate Straights with Slapp Happy, the two groups decided to merge, and Henry Cow, for the first time, acquired a vocalist, Dagmar Krause of Slapp Happy.

There were initially no plans to add lyrics to "Living in the Heart of the Beast", which Hodgkinson had developed as an instrumental before Krause joined. The addition of a singer opened up new possibilities for the piece, and Hodgkinson commissioned Slapp Happy's Peter Blegvad to write lyrics for Krause to sing. However, after several attempts, Blegvad (who was soon to be asked to leave the band) admitted that he was "out of [his] depth", and Hodgkinson wrote the lyrics himself. Blegvad presented a different interpretation of this situation in a 1996 interview with Hearsay magazine:

The piece that got me kicked out [of Henry Cow] was "Living in the Heart of the Beast". I was assigned the task for the collective to come up with suitable verbals, and I wrote two verses about a woman throwing raisins at a pile of bones ... Tim Hodgkinson said, "I'm sorry, this is not at all what we want", and he wrote reams of this political tirade. I admired his passion and application but it left me cold. I am to my bones a flippant individual. I don't know why I was created thus or what I'm trying to deny, but it clashed with the extreme seriousness.

"Living in the Heart of the Beast" was recorded in February and March 1975 and released on In Praise of Learning in May of that year. The piece was recorded in sections which were edited together because the group had yet to master playing it. In his book Rocking the Classics: English Progressive Rock and the Counterculture, Edward Macan described the song as a 15-minute piece that opens with an "atonal, highly distorted electric guitar solo" and closes with a "stately modal march".

After recording the album, the Henry Cow/Slapp Happy merger ended, but Krause elected to remain with Henry Cow. The final version of "Living in the Heart of the Beast" was performed live by Henry Cow between 1975 and 1977. In a concert with Robert Wyatt at the Théâtre des Champs-Élysées in Paris on 8 May 1975, Wyatt joined Krause in singing the closing verses.

"Living in the Heart of the Beast" was later remixed and slightly shortened by Fred Frith, Hodgkinson and Martin Bisi, and was released by East Side Digital Records on the 1991 CD reissue of In Praise of Learning. It also appeared on Henry Cow's The Virgin Years – Souvenir Box (1991). The original mix of the song was used on all subsequent reissues of this album.

== Composition and structure ==
In his 2019 book Henry Cow: The World Is a Problem, Benjamin Piekut wrote that themes in Hodgkinson's lyrics for "Living in the Heart of the Beast" include "Marxist humanism, linguistics and situationism". Quotes from Mao Zedong also feature in Hodgkinson's texts. Piekut said the song begins in the first-person (the "subjective 'I'") and tells the story of someone discovering that they are oppressed by huge corporations which distort history and corrupt the truth. As the song progresses, this individual unites with like-minded comrades who question their situation, and the "I" becomes "the communist 'we' of the collective revolution". Aware now of their plight and armed with "a historical consciousness", the song culminates with the call to rise up and seize their destiny. Piekut said the song's "abstract poetics" in the early sections, "give way [in the final section] to a more direct style impelling action".

In Beyond and Before: Progressive Rock Since the 1960s, Paul Hegarty and Martin Halliwell wrote that the song's opening verses chart the decline of revolt, from "rebellion to helpless loathing" to "wallow[ing] in the hopelessness of capitalist society". They suggested that the variations in the instrumental sections are "purposeful, illustrating the dormant hope of devising ways towards a new society." These sections become longer with "atonal interruptions" and "short group crescendo moments", which give way to a "long developmental section" that culminates in the closing verses. Here the rift between labour and consumption is exposed and calls to "overturn the existing order" are made. Hegarty and Halliwell stated that the instrumentation in these final sections stabilises "to illustrate that a desired outcome must be established instead of deferred".

Piekut said that Hodgkinson developed the musical structure for "Living in the Heart of the Beast" from concepts he had read in Rudolph Reti's book, The Thematic Process in Music. Hodgkinson created a set of musical cells which he combined in various permutations to build the piece's major movements. Sequences of cells were repeated using different transpositions in sections of the piece in a way that each successive movement was longer than its predecessor. These sequences were never intended to specify precise rhythm, dynamics and melody, but rather to serve as a "roadmap". Piekut said Hodgkinson did, however, deviate from the resulting structure from time to time when he found the "musical logic of growing consciousness [did not] match the radical transformation communicated in the lyrics".

== Reception ==
Reviewing In Praise of Learning in Let It Rock, Dave Laing wrote that he was impressed with Hodgkinson's "Living in the Heart of the Beast", noting its "long controlled lyric" and its "determined fermenting movement to its climax". Writing in The Wire, Philip Clark suggested that "Living in the Heart of the Beast" is "perhaps the archetypal Cow statement" (italics in the original text), and the prototype of the soon-to-be Rock in Opposition movement.

In a review of the album in Melody Maker, Steve Lake called "Living in the Heart of the Beast" "the album's tour-de-force". He described the music as "threatening and propulsive", and said Krause's "very flexible voice" becomes "increasingly harsher" as the song advances to its "nobly powerful finish". Lake wrote that the "almost majestic theme" that fades-out at the end of the song "echoes through the brain long after the album's finished." He saw this "echo" as symbolic, stating that "[t]he struggle for freedom is, after all far from finished."

In another review of the album in New Musical Express, music critic Ian MacDonald wrote that "Living in the Heart of the Beast" begins well, but despite "a remarkable instrumental interlude", it "run[s] out of cool" towards the end with some pretentious lyrics and "sinks awkwardly to earth beneath the would-be climactic exhortations of the finale". MacDonald added, however, that Henry Cow's use of a wide range of instruments gives the song a "genuinely orchestral sound" evoking shades of Stravinsky, Varèse, Messiaen and Weill. MacDonald concluded that "Living in the Heart of the Beast" demonstrates that Henry Cow "could be said to be the only genuine rock/classical fusion since [Frank Zappa's] Uncle Meat".

== Personnel ==
- Tim Hodgkinson – Farfisa organ, piano
- Fred Frith – guitar, violin, xylophone
- John Greaves – bass guitar
- Chris Cutler – drums
- Dagmar Krause (credited as "Dagmar") – vocals
- Peter Blegvad – guitar
- Anthony Moore – piano, electronics, "tapework"

== Live performances ==
"Living in the Heart of the Beast" was performed by Henry Cow at a number of their concerts between 1975 and 1977, including:

- 8 May 1975 with Robert Wyatt at the Théâtre des Champs-Élysées in Paris, France
  - Released in Volume 2: 1974–5 of The 40th Anniversary Henry Cow Box Set
- May and June 1975 with Robert Wyatt in London, England and Rome, Italy
- 25 August 1976 in Vevey, Switzerland for the Swiss TV program, Kaleidospop
  - Released on DVD in Volume 10: Vevey of The 40th Anniversary Henry Cow Box Set, the only known video recording of Henry Cow
- January 1976 in London, England
- September and November 1976 in Italy and France
- May 1977 in Sweden
- June 1977 in Southend-on-Sea, England

== Works cited ==
- Cutler, Chris, ed. (2009). "The Road: Volumes 1–5". The 40th Anniversary Henry Cow Box Set (box set booklet). Henry Cow. London: Recommended Records.
- Hegarty, Paul; Halliwell, Martin (2011). Beyond and Before: Progressive Rock Since the 1960s. London: Bloomsbury Publishing. ISBN 978-1-4411-1480-8.
- Piekut, Benjamin (2019). Henry Cow: The World Is a Problem. Duke University Press. ISBN 978-1-47800-405-9.
