= Ray Smith (artist) =

English sculptor, painter, illustrator, and writer (1949–2018)

- Born: 1949; Harrow, London, England
- Died: 2018 (aged 68–69)
- Education: Trinity Hall, Cambridge
- Alma mater: University of Cambridge
- Known for: Sculpture, painting, illustrations
- Notable work: On the Crest of a Wave (1996), Red Wave (1990)
- Spouse: Catriona (née Hermon) (m. 1971)
- Children: Emily, Henry and Camilla
- Parents: Geoff Smith (father); Pat Smith (née Pearce) (mother)
- Awards: Arts Council of Great Britain, Royal Society of Arts
- Website: raysmithartist.com

Ray Smith (1949–2018) was an English sculptor, painter, illustrator and writer. He exhibited his work widely, and received a number of awards, including an award by the Arts Council of Great Britain in 1973, and the Royal Society of Arts Architecture Award in 1993. Smith also wrote several books on art for the publisher Dorling Kindersley and designed a selection of album covers.

In an obituary in The Guardian, Ghislaine Kenyon described Smith as "the complete artist", and despite having had no formal art training, "he expressed himself playfully in words, music and visual arts, using myriad techniques and media."

== Biography ==
Smith was born in 1949 in Harrow, London to Geoff Smith and Pat Smith (née Pearce). He attended Southend High School for Boys in Essex and studied English at Trinity Hall, Cambridge. Smith graduated in 1971, and in the 1970s and 1980s, he freelanced in London, where he taught English at the Cambridge School of English and lectured at the Chelsea School of Art.

During this period, Smith also designed and illustrated album covers for several bands and musicians, including experimental rock group Henry Cow, and new wave band Heaven 17. Smith had met some of the members of Henry Cow at Cambridge, and joined the group at concerts as a performance artist in the early 1970s, miming with glove puppets, ironing, and reading "short passages of discontinuous text" during breaks in the music. He then went on to produce his distinctive "paint sock" cover art work for Henry Cow's first three albums. Smith created them with a pastry bag that he used to squeeze out long strips of acrylic paint, which, once dry, he wove together to produce the socks.

In 1971, Smith married Catriona Hermon, a fellow student at Cambridge. He illustrated two of her children's books, The Long Slide (1977) and The Long Dive (1978), and won two awards in 1978 for his work in The Long Slide. Kenyon said the illustrations "are lovely early examples of Ray's precise, whimsical style." Smith went on to write and illustrate a children's book of his own, Jacko's Play (1980), followed by a series of DK art books between 1984 and 1995. One of them, The Artist's Handbook (1987) had its fourth edition published in 2008. Smith also served as consulting editor for DK's Art School series.

Smith explored several art forms, including sculpture, painting and portrait photography, and he exhibited his work widely. He was self-employed and much of his output was commissioned. Among Smith's many commissions were a ceramic tile painting spanning three floors at St. Mary's Hospital on the Isle of Wight, two stone and steel sculptures for the Leeds Development Agency at Quarry Hill, Leeds in 1994, and a portrait of archaeologist Colin Renfrew in 2000.

Smith created a number of painted steel sculptures, including Hind in 2001, a 5m high sculpture at the Boston Manor House in Brentford, commissioned by the Green Corridor Partnership, and Chain Reaction in 1992, a 12m sculpture for the New Towns Campbell Park, Milton Keynes. Smith's Red Army (1990), a painted steel sculpture of 1,000 pieces was commissioned by, and featured at, the 1990 Gateshead National Garden Festival; it has since been relocated to Frank Lloyd Wright's Kentuck Knob home in Pennsylvania in the United States.

Smith's first solo exhibition was at the School of Architecture at Cambridge in 1970, and he hosted many more during his career, including at the Spacex Gallery in Exeter in 1987, and at the Winchester Gallery in Winchester in 1990. He has also shown his work at numerous group exhibitions in Britain and elsewhere, including at the British Art Show in 1983–84, and the 2nd International Drawings Triennale in Nuremberg, Germany.

Smith received many awards during his career, including the John Moores Liverpool Exhibition in 1989, and the 1993 Royal Society of Arts: Art for Architecture Award. On the Crest of a Wave (1996), a Portland stone and green Kirkstone sculpture commissioned by the Dover Public Art Commission, won Smith the 1996 Rouse Kent Public Art Award. He also won a number of competitions for his sculptures, including Face to Face (1992) for the Birmingham City Council, and Eights Tree (2001) for Sustrans and the RC Sherriff Trust. Smith consulted on several art projects, including serving as lead artist for the construction of the Bristol Royal Hospital for Children from 1997 to 2001.

Between 1978 and 1981, Smith was a fine arts fellow at Southampton University, and a visiting scholar at a number of art colleges and universities, including the University of Plymouth from 1986 to 1995, and the Hull College of Higher Education in 1981. He also sat on the National Curriculum's working group for arts in 1990, and lectured at the National Gallery, and the Exeter School of Art.

Smith died in 2018 from dementia at the age of 69.

== Gallery ==
Selection of Smith's painted steel sculptures

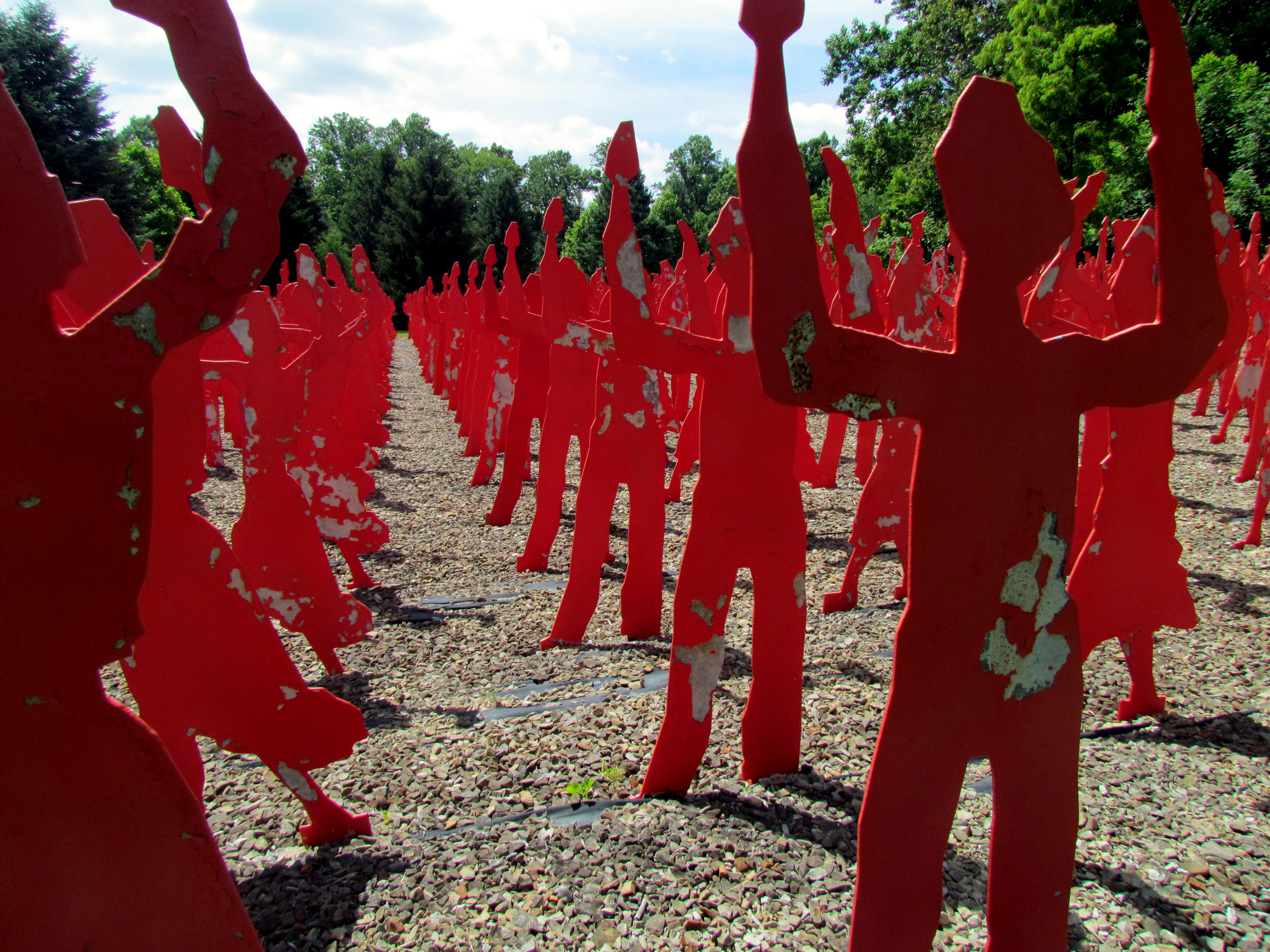
Red Army (1990)
Frank Lloyd Wright's Kentuck Knob home in Pennsylvania

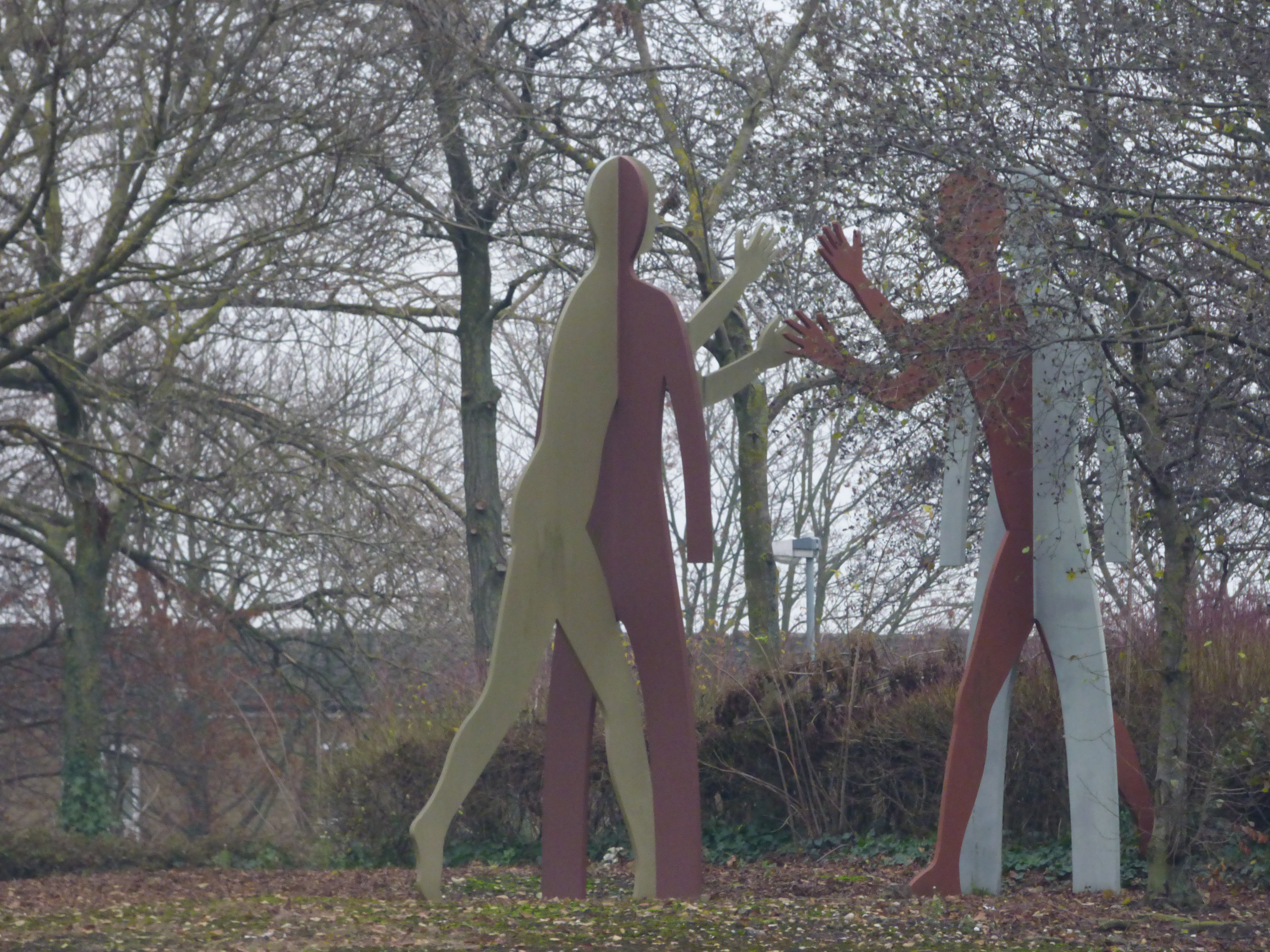
Face to Face (1992)
Waterlinks Boulevard, Aston, Birmingham

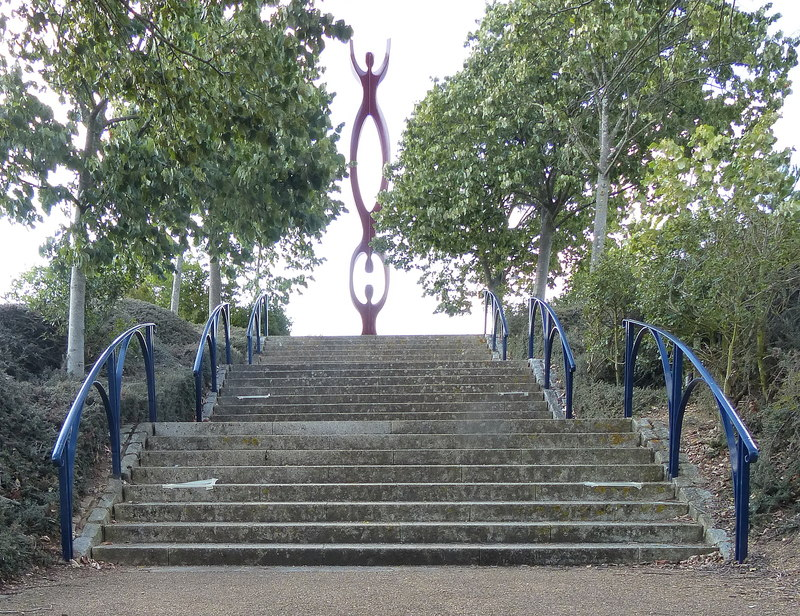
Chain Reaction (1992)
Campbell Park, Milton Keynes

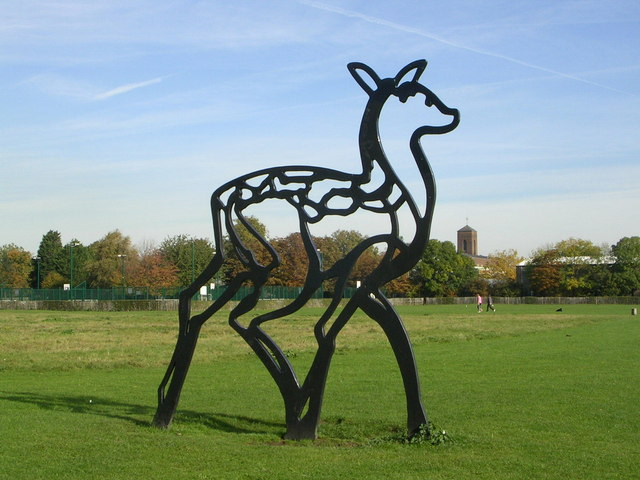
Hind (2001)
Elthorne Rough, Hanwell

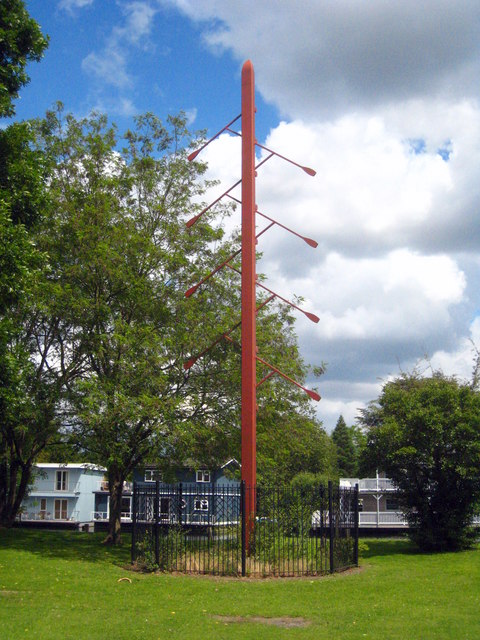
Eights Tree (2001)
River Thames, East Molesey, Surrey

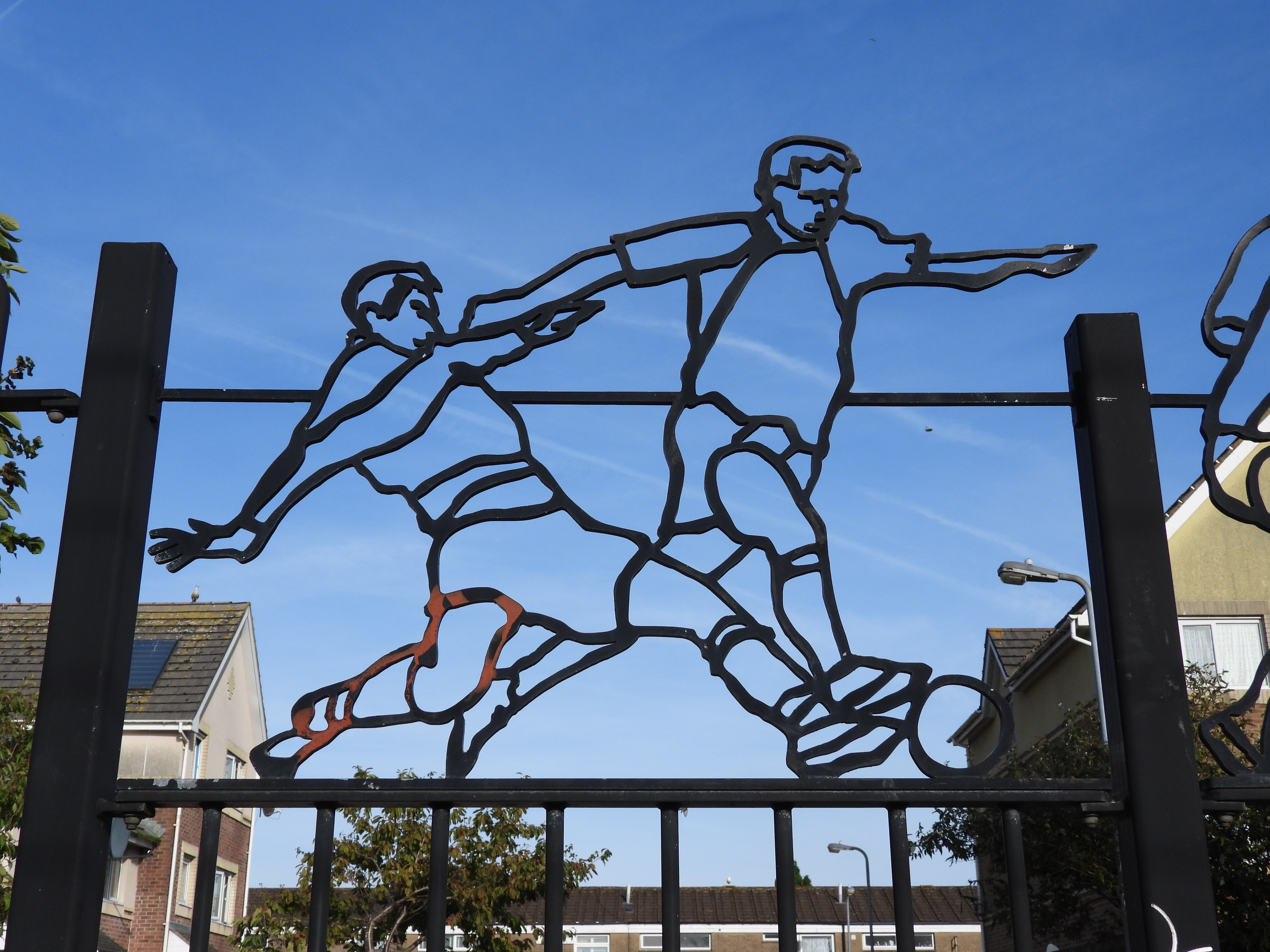
Angelina Street (2004)
Angelina Street, Cardiff, Wales

== Awards ==
- 1973 – Arts Council of Great Britain
- 1977 – Linbury Trust Artists Award
- 1978 – Deutscher Jugendliteraturpreis
- 1978 – National Book League Design Award
- 1982 – Sainsbury's "Images for Today" Award
- 1982 – Prizewinner at the 2nd International Drawings Triennale, Nuremberg, Germany
- 1985 – Major Award at the 7th Cleveland International Drawing Biennale
- 1989 – Prizewinner at the John Moores Liverpool Exhibition
- 1993 – Royal Society of Arts: Art for Architecture Award
- 1996 – Rouse Kent Public Art Award

== Selected bibliography ==
- 1980 – Jacko's Play, Macmillan Children's Books
- 1984 – How to Draw and Paint What You See, Dorling Kindersley
- 1987 – The Artist's Handbook, Dorling Kindersley
- 1993 – DK Art School: Introduction to Watercolour, Dorling Kindersley.
- 1993 – DK Art School: Watercolour – Colour, Dorling Kindersley.
- 1993 – DK Art School: Watercolour – Landscape (consultant editor), Dorling Kindersley
- 1993 – DK Art School: Introduction to Oil Painting, Dorling Kindersley
- 1993 – DK Art School: Introduction to Acrylic Painting, Dorling Kindersley
- 1994 – DK Art School: Oil Painting Portraits, Dorling Kindersley
- 1994 – DK Art School: Drawing Figures, Dorling Kindersley
- 1995 – DK Art School: Introduction to Perspective, Dorling Kindersley

== Selected album cover designs ==
- 1973 – Legend, Henry Cow
- 1974 – Unrest, Henry Cow
- 1974 – Guitar Solos, Fred Frith
- 1975 – In Praise of Learning, Henry Cow
- 1975 – Matching Head and Feet, Kevin Coyne
- 1981 – Joy, Skids
- 1981 – Penthouse and Pavement, Heaven 17
- 1983 – The Luxury Gap, Heaven 17
- 1984 – How Men Are, Heaven 17
- 1996 – Bigger Than America, Heaven 17

== See also ==
- Legend – Smith's work with Henry Cow as performer and album cover artist

== Works cited ==
- Buckman, David (2006). Artists in Britain since 1945: Volume 2 (M to Z) (2nd ed.). Art Dictionaries Limited. pp. 1476–1477. ISBN 9780953260959.
- Piekut, Benjamin (2019). Henry Cow: The World Is a Problem. Duke University Press. ISBN 978-1-47800-405-9.
- Romano, Will (2014). Prog Rock FAQ: All That's Left To Know About Rock's Most Progressive Music (e-book ed.). Milwaukee, Wisconsin: Backbeat Books. ISBN 978-1-61713-587-3.
