= The 40th Anniversary Henry Cow Box Set =

Box set by Henry Cow
- Released: January 2009
- Recorded: 1972–1978
- Genres: Avant-rock; free improvisation
- Length: 596:28 (excluding bonus CD)
- Label: Recommended (UK)
- Producer: Henry Cow

Henry Cow chronology
Stockholm & Göteborg (2008)	The 40th Anniversary Henry Cow Box Set (2009)	The Henry Cow Box Redux: The Complete Henry Cow (2019)

The 40th Anniversary Henry Cow Box Set (also known as The Road) is a nine-CD plus one-DVD limited edition box set by English avant-rock group Henry Cow, and was released by RēR Megacorp in January 2009. It consists of almost 10 hours of previously unreleased recordings made between 1972 and 1978 from concerts, radio broadcasts, one-off projects, events and the studio. Included are new compositions, over four hours of free improvisation, and live performances of some of Henry Cow's original LP repertoire.

Chris Cutler, of Henry Cow and RēR Megacorp, planned and coordinated the whole project. Assembly of the recordings began in the mid-1990s and were edited by Cutler. He also prepared and edited two books that are included in the box set. Bob Drake remastered and, where possible, non-invasively remixed the original recordings at Studio Midi-Pyrenees in France between 2004 and 2008.

The box set was expected to be ready before the end of 2008 to coincide with the 40th anniversary of the formation of Henry Cow, but the discovery of additional material delayed its release. Volume 6 of the box set, Stockholm & Göteborg was released separately by RēR Megacorp in September 2008 in advance of the box set's release. A limited edition bonus CD, A Cow Cabinet of Curiosities was given to subscribers of the box set.

In March 2017 Volumes 1 to 5 and 7 to 10 of the box set, plus the bonus CD were each released by RēR Megacorp as separate albums.

== Reception ==
Professional ratings
Review scores
Source	Rating
All About Jazz	5/5 stars
AllMusic	3.5/5 stars

"[This is] one of the best collections ever released about a group that most people have never heard."

— John Kelman at All About Jazz.

In a review of The 40th Anniversary Henry Cow Box Set, John Kelman at All About Jazz said that it "offers, for the first time, a comprehensive account of Henry Cow's breadth and depth." He went on to say that "If ever there were a group with a wrong to be righted, it would have to be Henry Cow. With a wellspring of unreleased material, an impressive editing and mastering job that's made even audience cassette recordings sound crystal clear ... [this] is the set die-hard fans have been waiting for." This review was listed third in All About Jazz's "Top 50 Most Recommended CD Reviews" for 2009.

François Couture at AllMusic described the box set as a "monument" and a "treasure trove". He said that it "present[s] for the first time a complete picture of Henry Cow, from the rehearsal-intensive compositions to the ever-important improvisations, through all incarnations of the band and including both highs and lows." A reviewer at Dusted Magazine stated that the compilation "fills in many missing historical and compositional links" and that it is a "fitting monument to one of the most interesting and eclectic groups to come out of the 1970s."

Reviewing the box set in Exposé, K. Leimer wrote that this demonstrates just how important and influential Henry Cow still are. He found it interesting that the anthology tracks the development of some of the band's composed pieces, from early demos to studio recordings to subsequent live performances. But Leimer added, "unlike those more typical historical recoveries, the earliest incarnations of Henry Cow’s work arrive with a completeness and presence that does not diminish in comparison to later live or studio manifestations of the 'same' piece". Many of these pieces are "flexible environments" rather than static compositions. He called Bremen and Stockholm & Göteborg "benchmark performances", and the Vevey DVD "an appropriate enough summa: hearing and seeing". Finally, Leimer complimented the box set's booklets, saying that "[t]he writing is articulate, honest, insightful and above all gives listeners something they rarely get with such candor and intelligence".

== Content ==
The box set is split into two boxes:

- Box 1: The Road: Volumes 1–5 consists of five CDs and a 60-page book, and covers the period 1972 to 1976. Included is the March 1976 Hamburg radio show that was John Greaves's last concert with the band, and the Trondheim concert that followed in May where Henry Cow improvised as a quartet in the dark.
- Box 2: The Road: Volumes 6–10 consists of four CDs, a DVD and a 60-page book, and covers the period 1976 to 1978. Included is the March 1978 Bremen radio broadcast and the May 1977 Swedish Radio broadcast. The DVD is a 75-minute video of Henry Cow (with Georgie Born and Dagmar Krause) performing in Switzerland in 1976.

Subscribers to this box set received a limited edition bonus CD, plus a third, empty box entitled The Studio: Volumes 1–5 to hold the five Henry Cow studio recordings re-issued on CD by Recommended Records in the Henry Cow Box in 2006. Space was left in The Road: Volumes 1–5 box for the CD re-issue of Concerts (also included in the Henry Cow Box). Combining the Henry Cow Box and The 40th Anniversary Henry Cow Box Set gives the complete works of Henry Cow.

== Box 1: The Road: Volumes 1–5 ==
A 60-page book accompanies this box and contains the following:

- Volumes 1–5 track notes
- Memoirs by John Greaves, Chris Cutler, Geoff Leigh, Lindsay Cooper, (Note: Lindsay Cooper's contribution was taken from a collection of memoirs she had dictated to a friend between 1999 and 2001 when she could no longer use her hands due to multiple sclerosis. The notes were for a book she was working on at the time, The Road is Wider Than Long: Travels with MS. Chris Cutler said that while this box set was being prepared, "communication [with her] had become almost impossible." Cooper died on 18 September 2013.) Peter Blegvad and Dagmar Krause
- Henry Cow concert list, May 1968 to August 1978 (Note: Compiled by Aymeric Leroy, and Chris Cutler.)

=== Volume 1: Beginnings ===
Extracts from rehearsal and other tapes from before Legend (1973).

"Pre-Teenbeat I/II" are fragments later incorporated into "Teenbeat". Track 6 is an extended version of "Teenbeat" with a lengthy guitar solo from Fred Frith and an embedded free improvisation section. "Citizen King" became "Nine Funerals of the Citizen King", and "Nirvana for Moles" became "Nirvana for Mice" on Legend. "Rapt in a Blanket" and "Came to See You" are two songs composed and sung by Frith around arrangements by Henry Cow. Frith had presented the songs to the group as just chords and a tune and in need of elaboration, which forced the band to adjust their approach from only working on longish instrumentals. At the time Chris Cutler had been rehearsing part-time with Henry Cow, and he has stated that it was this new challenge which prompted him to join the group permanently.

With the Yellow Half-Moon and Blue Star is a Frith composition that was commissioned by the Cambridge Contemporary Dance Group under Liebe Klug, and was named after a painting by Paul Klee (Avec la demi-lune jaune et l'étoile bleue). Only an extract of it appeared on Legend, whereas it is featured here for the first time in its entirety. Guider Tells of Silent Airborne Machine is a suite with three parts, "Olwyn Grainger" and "Betty McGowan" by the group and "Lottie Hare" ("a neo-classical miniature") by John Greaves. Its inspiration came from a news item that appeared on 23 August 1971 in The Times about a group of Girl Guide leaders, Olwyn Grainger, Lottie Hare and Betty McGowan who had reported witnessing a UFO.

==== Track list ====
No.	Title	Writer(s)	Length
1.	"Pre-Teenbeat I"	Fred Frith	1:44
2.	"Pre-Teenbeat II"	Frith	1:28
3.	"Rapt in a Blanket"	Frith	5:06
4.	"Came to See You"	Frith	6:43
5.	"Amygdala extract (pre-Legend demo)"	Tim Hodgkinson	3:35
6.	"Teenbeat"	Frith	10:19
7.	"Citizen King"	Hodgkinson	5:21
8.	"Nirvana for Moles"	Frith	4:09

With the Yellow Half-Moon and Blue Star
No.	Title	Writer(s)	Length
9.	"Introduction"	Frith	0:46
10.	"Invocation"	Frith	2:08
11.	"Demi-Lune Jaune"	Frith	2:10
12.	"Three Little Steps"	Frith	2:13
13.	"Red Riff"	Frith	1:50
14.	"Chorale Flautando"	Frith	1:51
15.	"Cycling over the Cliff"	Frith	4:08
16.	"First Light"	Frith	0:51

Guider Tells of Silent Airborne Machine
No.	Title	Writer(s)	Length
17.	"Olwyn Grainger"	Chris Cutler, Frith, John Greaves, Hodgkinson	2:24
18.	"Betty McGowan"	Cutler, Frith, Greaves, Hodgkinson, Geoff Leigh	6:12
19.	"Lottie Hare"	Greaves	1:24
Total length:			64:26

==== Personnel ====
- Chris Cutler – drums, piano (start of track 18)
- Fred Frith – guitar, violin, voice (tracks 3,4)
- John Greaves – bass guitar, piano (end of tracks 18,19), voice (tracks 7,18)
- Tim Hodgkinson – organ, alto saxophone, melodica, clarinet, voice (track 7)
- Geoff Leigh – tenor saxophone (tracks 1,2,5–19), flute (tracks 1,2,5–19), voice (tracks 7,9,16)

===== Guests =====
- Amanda Parsons – conversation (track 6)
- Ann Rosenthal – conversation (track 6)
- D.J. Perry – spoken passage (tracks 9,16)
- Dave Stewart – celeste (track 6), conversation (track 6)

==== Track notes ====
- Tracks 1,2,5 are from rehearsal tapes, recorded by Jack Balchin before Legend
- Tracks 3,4,6 were recorded on the John Peel Show in London, 28 February 1972; broadcast by the BBC on 14 March 1972 (Note: This is a correction of what appears in the CD liner notes.)
- Tracks 7,8,17–19 were recorded on the John Peel Show in London, 24 April 1973; broadcast by the BBC on 8 May 1973
- Tracks 9–16 were recorded on the John Peel Show in London, 17 October 1972; broadcast by the BBC on 14 November 1972

=== Volume 2: 1974–5 ===
A collection of live performances from 1974 and 1975.

Halsteren is an instrumental suite that incorporates an early version of Tim Hodgkinson's "Living in the Heart of the Beast" from In Praise of Learning (1975). Recorded in Halsteren in September 1974 when Henry Cow was a quartet of Cutler, Frith, Greaves and Hodgkinson, Hodgkinson's unfinished instrumental is performed here in sections interspaced with improvisations by the group. Part of another performance of this suite also features in "Groningen" on Concerts (1976). Halsteren concert organiser Jan Smagge recounts in the box set booklets an anecdote where the band were approached by several people during an interval and asked whether they could play any songs by Mud, a contemporary mainstream pop act. Halsteren is followed here by "Living in the Heart of the Beast" from a Paris concert with Robert Wyatt in May 1975. It is the first live recording of the completed vocal version of the composition, and is sung by Dagmar Krause, her first public appearance with the band, with Wyatt accompanying her in the closing verses.

==== Track list ====
No.	Title	Writer(s)	Length
1.	"Introduction"	Lindsay Cooper	1:52
2.	"Ruins I"	Fred Frith	6:35
3.	"Half Asleep, Half Awake"	John Greaves	4:11
4.	"Ruins II"	Frith	0:59
5.	"Heron Shower over Hamburg"	Frith	2:29
6.	"Nix"		0:06

Halsteren (Hodgkinson, Frith, Greaves, Cutler)
No.	Title	Writer(s)	Length
7.	"Halsteren 1"		1:08
8.	"Solo 1"	Tim Hodgkinson	1:08
9.	"Solo Extension 1"		2:21
10.	"Halsteren 2"		1:24
11.	"Extension 1"		0:17
12.	"Halsteren 3"		0:52
13.	"First Suspension"		4:28
14.	"Extension 2"		2:58
15.	"Extension 3"		1:19
16.	"Solo 2"	Frith	1:20
17.	"Solo Extension 2"		2:32
18.	"Halsteren 4"		0:17
19.	"Second Suspension"		2:34
20.	"Extension 4"		1:58
21.	"Solo 3"		0:49
22.	"Solo Extension 3"	Greaves	3:17
23.	"Halsteren 5"		1:21

No.	Title	Writer(s)	Length
24.	"Living in the Heart of the Beast": 24. "Part 1"; 25. "Part 2"; 26. "Part 3"; 27. "Part 4"; 28. "Part 5"; 29. "Part 6"; 30. "Part 7"; 31. "Part 8"; 32. "Part 9"	Hodgkinson	13:46
Total length:			60:21

==== Personnel ====
- Lindsay Cooper – oboe (tracks 1–5,24–32), bassoon (tracks 1–5,24–32), piano (tracks 24–32)
- Chris Cutler – drums, glass bowls and clatter (tracks 7–23)
- Fred Frith – guitar (tracks 1–5,24–32), viola (tracks 1–5,24–32), piano (track 1,2), electric and acoustic guitars (tracks 7–23), prism (tracks 7–23), xylophone (tracks 24–32)
- John Greaves – bass guitar, piano (track 3), clothes pegs (tracks 7–23)
- Tim Hodgkinson – organ, alto saxophone, clarinet (tracks 7–23)
- Dagmar Krause – voice (tracks 24–32)

===== Guests =====
- Robert Wyatt – voice (tracks 29,32)

==== Track notes ====
- Tracks 1–5 were recorded on the John Peel Show in London, 25 April 1974; broadcast by the BBC on 9 May 1974
- Tracks 7–23 are from a concert at the Verenigingsgebouw in Halsteren, 26 September 1974, recorded by Jan Smagge on a stereo reel-to-reel
- Tracks 24–32 are from a concert at the Théâtre des Champs-Élysées, Paris, 8 May 1975, with live mix by Sarah Greaves

=== Volume 3: Hamburg ===
Recordings from Henry Cow's March 1976 NDR Jazz Workshop in Hamburg, Germany, plus two songs with Robert Wyatt from concerts in Paris and Rome in May and June 1975, respectively.

"Fair as the Moon", followed later by "Terrible as an Army with Banners" are based on "Beautiful as the Moon – Terrible as an Army with Banners" from In Praise of Learning (1975), and became the longest lasting "building block" the band used in live performances. "Nirvana for Rabbits" is a rework of the Frith composition "Nirvana for Mice" from Legend (1973), while "Ottawa Song" is part of a longer suite Frith composed for the Ottawa Company, the rest of which never survived, except for fragments that appeared in "Muddy Mouse" and "Muddy Mouth" on Wyatt's solo album, Ruth Is Stranger Than Richard (1975). This performance of "Ottawa Song" also appears (by accident) on Volume 6: Stockholm & Göteborg, but without the introductory bassoon solo. "Gloria Gloom" is from Matching Mole's second album, Matching Mole's Little Red Record (1972). "Hamburg 1–5", "Red Noise 10" and "A Heart" are improvisations by the band, the last two titled at the request of NDR. (Note: While Henry Cow generally left their improvisations untitled and referred to them by the venue they were performed at, some radio broadcasters requested that they be given titles.) "Hamburg 2" includes a fragment from Slapp Happy's song, "A Little Something".

Wyatt sings on "Little Red Riding Hood Hit the Road" from his solo album, Rock Bottom (1974), and on "We Did It Again", a "surprising and wackily absurdist" cover of the Soft Machine song from their debut album, The Soft Machine (1968). The version of "We Did It Again" that appears on this CD is a combination of two different recordings of the same performance, one from an audience cassette recording with "a lot of audience reaction, a lot of guitar, thin-sounding drums and bass, and only a faint echo of the vocals", and one from the mixing desk with "almost no guitar, but plenty of drums, bass, and vocals".

==== Track list ====
No.	Title	Writer(s)	Length
1.	"Fair as the Moon"	Chris Cutler, Fred Frith	6:01
2.	"Nirvana for Rabbits"	Frith	4:48
3.	"Ottawa Song"	Cutler, Frith	3:41
4.	"Twilight Bridge"	Lindsay Cooper, Cutler, Frith, John Greaves, Tim Hodgkinson, Dagmar Krause	2:04
5.	"Gloria Gloom"	Robert Wyatt, Bill MacCormick	2:17
6.	"Hamburg 1"	Cooper, Cutler, Frith, Greaves, Hodgkinson, Krause	4:15
7.	"Hamburg 2"	Cooper, Cutler, Frith, Greaves, Hodgkinson, Krause	3:27
8.	"Red Noise 10"	Cooper, Cutler, Frith, Greaves, Hodgkinson, Krause	3:16
9.	"Hamburg 3"	Cooper, Cutler, Frith, Greaves, Hodgkinson, Krause	5:30
10.	"Hamburg 4"	Cooper, Cutler, Frith, Greaves, Hodgkinson, Krause	2:40
11.	"Hamburg 5"	Cooper, Cutler, Frith, Greaves, Hodgkinson, Krause	5:25
12.	"Terrible as an Army with Banners"	Cutler, Frith	3:34
13.	"A Heart"	Cooper, Cutler, Frith, Greaves, Hodgkinson, Krause	9:03
14.	"Little Red Riding Hood Hit the Road"	Wyatt	5:12
15.	"We Did It Again"	Kevin Ayers	6:31
Total length:			67:51

==== Personnel ====
- Chris Cutler – drums
- Lindsay Cooper – oboe, bassoon, flute, piano (tracks 7–11)
- Fred Frith – guitar, piano (tracks 1,4,12,13)
- John Greaves – bass guitar, voice (track 3)
- Tim Hodgkinson – organ, alto saxophone
- Dagmar Krause – voice

===== Guests =====
- Robert Wyatt – voice (tracks 14,15)

==== Track notes ====
- Tracks 1–13 are from a public concert recorded for the NDR Jazz Workshop, Hamburg, 26 March 1976
- Track 14 are from a concert at the Piazza Navona, Rome, 27 June 1975, mixed by Sarah Greaves
- Track 15 are from a concert at the Théâtre des Champs-Élysées, Paris, 8 May 1975, with live mix by Sarah Greaves

=== Volume 4–5: Trondheim ===
A double CD of a complete concert recorded in Trondheim, Norway on 26 May 1976, later broadcast on the Sveriges Radio radio program, Tonkraft on 14 July 1976.

When Henry Cow prepared to embark on their May 1976 tour of Scandinavia, they were two members short: John Greaves had left the band after the March 1976 Hamburg concert, and Dagmar Krause had remained behind in Hamburg due to ill-health. As they were committed to the tour, Henry Cow, as a quartet of Cutler, Frith, Hodgkinson and Cooper, abandoned their familiar set lists and decided to improvise all the concerts on the tour in the dark. They were also accompanied by "shadows that were not us", which were two-hour tapes that Cooper, Hodgkinson and Frith had each prepared. The subject of the tapes were: Cooper – youth to old age; Hodgkinson – history of language; and Frith – history of Henry Cow. The tapes ran continuously and inaudibly throughout the duration of the show, but were made audible by their creators from time to time with a foot pedal, without knowing what part of the tape would be heard. Chris Cutler explained that it was an "attempt to inhabit a dramaturgy anchored in narratives of origins, evolution, history and ritual". They also decided to disguise and "primitivise" themselves and their equipment, and hence the darkness.

Another recording from this Scandinavian tour where Henry Cow performed in the dark was released as "Sundsvall, or Helsinki" on "Ex Box – Collected Fragments 1971–1978", a bonus CD given to subscribers of the 2019 Henry Cow Box Redux: The Complete Henry Cow.

François Couture at AllMusic called Trondheim the "crown jewel" of the box set, saying it was "some of [Henry Cow's] darkest and most thrilling music". John Kelman at All About Jazz described Trondheim as "about as unapproachable as Henry Cow ever got, and yet amongst the densities and at times harsh realms are moments of profound beauty. The 80-minute improvisation ... demonstrates the kind of intuitive push-and-pull that could only come from musicians not just spending a great deal of time playing together, but also living together, with a potent ability to sometimes shift ambience and color at the drop of a dime."

==== Track list ====
Disk 1
No.	Title	Writer(s)	Length
1.	"Trondheim I": 1. "Part 1"; 2. "Part 2"; 3. "Part 3"; 4. "Part 4"; 5. "Part 5"; 6. "Part 6"; 7. "Part 7"; 8. "Part 8"; 9. "Part 9"; 10. "Part 10"	Lindsay Cooper, Chris Cutler, Fred Frith, Tim Hodgkinson	48:25
Total length:			48:25

Disk 2
No.	Title	Writer(s)	Length
1.	"Trondheim II": 1. "Part 1"; 2. "Part 2"; 3. "Part 3"; 4. "Part 4"; 5. "Part 5"; 6. "Part 6"	Cooper, Cutler, Frith, Hodgkinson	31:54
7.	"The March"	Frith arr. Henry Cow	6:25
Total length:			38:19

==== Personnel ====
- Lindsay Cooper – oboe, bassoon, tapes, voice, flute (CD 1), recorder (CD 1), piano (CD 1, tracks 7–9), jaw harp (CD 2)
- Chris Cutler – drums, telephone mouthpieces, amplification, flotsam (CD 1), voice (CD 1), jetsam (CD 2), piano (CD 2)
- Fred Frith – guitar, 6-string bass guitar, xylophone, tapes, violin (CD 1), tubular bells (CD 1),
- Tim Hodgkinson – organ, clarinet, voice, tapes, alto saxophone (CD 2), mbira (CD 2)

==== Track notes ====
- All tracks from a cassette recording made by Henry Cow at the mixing desk at a concert at Studentersamfundet, Trondheim, 26 May 1976, mixed by Joel Schwartz

== Box 2: The Road: Volumes 6–10 ==
A 60-page book accompanies this box and contains the following:

- Volumes 6–10 track notes
- Memoirs by Nick Hobbs, Franco Fabbri, Georgina Born, Fred Frith, Chris Wangro and Tim Hodgkinson
- Post Henry Cow collaborations
- A summary economic history of Henry Cow
- Appendix 1: Equipment – PA system, studio, vehicles (Note: Taken from documents written by Nick Hobbs that were included with Henry Cow's application for support from the Arts Council.)
- Appendix 2: 1977 Henry Cow accounts
- Appendix 3: Extract from the Henry Cow Weekly Meeting Minute Book, 13 December 1976, Trappes

=== Volume 6: Stockholm & Göteborg ===
Swedish Radio recordings of concerts performed in May 1976 in Gothenburg and May 1977 in Stockholm. This CD was released separately from the box set by RēR Megacorp in September 2008.

==== Track list ====
No.	Title	Writer(s)	Length
1.	"Stockholm 1"	Georgina Born, Lindsay Cooper, Chris Cutler, Fred Frith, Tim Hodgkinson	6:38
2.	"Erk Gah": 2. "Part 1"; 3. "Part 2"; 4. "Part 3"; 5. "Part 4"; 6. "Part 5"	Hodgkinson	17:06 3:28 2:55 2:27 6:17 1:59
7.	"A Bridge to Ruins"	Hodgkinson	5:08
8.	"Ottawa Song"	Cutler, Frith	3:27
9.	"Göteborg 1": 9. "Part 1"; 10. "Part 2"; 11. "Part 3"	Cooper, Cutler, Frith, John Greaves, Hodgkinson	16:53 6:06 8:20 2:27
12.	"No More Songs"	Phil Ochs arr. Frith	3:35
13.	"Stockholm 2"	Born, Cooper, Cutler, Frith, Hodgkinson, Dagmar Krause	6:13
14.	"March"	Frith	4:15
Total length:			63:23

==== Personnel ====
- Georgie Born – bass guitar, cello (tracks 1–7,12–14)
- Lindsay Cooper – bassoon, flute, recorder, piano (tracks 1–2), tapes (tracks 9–11)
- Chris Cutler – drums, electrification, piano (track 10)
- Fred Frith – guitar, xylophone, tapes (tracks 9–11), piano (tracks 13–14)
- Tim Hodgkinson – organ, alto saxophone, clarinet, voice (tracks 9–11), tapes (tracks 9–11)
- Dagmar Krause – singing (tracks 1–7,12–14)
- John Greaves – bass guitar (track 8), voice (track 8)

==== Track notes ====
- Tracks 1–7 and 12–14 were recorded for Tonkraft by Sveriges Radio at a concert in Stockholm on 9 May 1977 and broadcast on 8 June and 11 June 1977; the programme producer was S. Vermalin
- Track 8 was recorded for the NDR Jazz Workshop in Hamburg on 26 March 1976; its inclusion in this volume was unintentional and later acknowledged (see Stockholm & Göteborg)
- Tracks 9-11 were recorded for Tonkraft by Sveriges Radio at a concert in Gothenburg on 28 May 1976 and broadcast on 14 July and 17 July 1976; the programme producer was Christer Eklund

=== Volume 7: Later and Post-Virgin ===
A collection of live performances from late 1976 and 1977.

"Joan" and "On Suicide", traditionally associated with Art Bears and Hopes and Fears (1978), feature here and show that they were Henry Cow songs long before Art Bears came into being. "On Suicide" is longer than the Art Bears version and ends with a cello solo by Georgie Born; the Brecht/Eisler song, arranged by Fred Frith, had been suggested to the group by Anthony Moore. The Art Bears version of "Joan" also differs from the live recording here in that it is shorter (several sections are "telescoped" into one), and the lyrics are not the same. Chris Cutler wrote the original lyrics for "Joan" and Tim Hodgkinson's "The Pirate Song", but the group were unhappy with them, and the songs were withdrawn from Henry Cow's repertoire. "Joan" was only performed a few times, and "The Pirate Song" not at all. Prior to Henry Cow's recording session at Sunrise in Switzerland in January 1978, Cutler rewrote the lyrics of the two songs, but once again there were objections from factions within the group. Dagmar Krause, however, supported the new lyrics and both songs were recorded by Henry Cow with the revised texts, only to be released later by Art Bears on Hopes and Fears as a result of further disagreements with the group.

"Untitled Piece" was a work-in-progress by Lindsay Cooper that was only performed a few times by Henry Cow, and foreshadowed some of her work that appeared later on her 1998 solo album A View From the Bridge. "Chaumont 1", "Chaumont 2" and "March" are from a Paris concert featuring an improvisation by the group, a bassoon and saxophone duet by Cooper and Hodgkinson, and Frith's familiar "March" to close the set. Also included are new renditions of "Teenbeat" and "Bittern Storm over Ulm". According to All About Jazz, "Teenbeat 2" features "some of Frith's most searing guitar playing of the box", and "Teenbeat 3" has "Hodgkinson's saxophone at its most visceral."

"Post-Teen Auditorium Invasion" and "Bucket Waltz" are from a concert in Amsterdam that feature guests Annemarie Roelofs and ex-Henry Cow member Geoff Leigh. Roelofs, who was attending the concert, began playing trombone from the audience and was invited to join Henry Cow on stage. She ended up touring with the band the following year and playing on Western Culture. Leigh, whose band Red Balune was playing at the same concert, was invited by his former band to guest with them.

==== Track list ====
No.	Title	Writer(s)	Length
1.	"Joan"	Chris Cutler, Fred Frith	5:26
2.	"Teenbeat 2"	Frith	8:05
3.	"Would You Prefer Us to Lie?"	Cutler, John Greaves	4:28
4.	"Untitled Piece"	Lindsay Cooper	11:31
5.	"Chaumont 1"	Georgina Born, Cooper, Cutler, Frith, Tim Hodgkinson	9:01
6.	"Chaumont 2"	Cooper, Hodgkinson	2:14
7.	"March"	Frith	7:00
8.	"Brain Storm over Barnsley"	Frith	3:23
9.	"Teenbeat 3"	Frith	6:45
10.	"Post-Teen Auditorium Invasion"	Cooper, Hodgkinson, Geoff Leigh, Annemarie Roelofs	3:56
11.	"Bucket Waltz"	Born, Cooper, Cutler, Frith, Hodgkinson, Leigh, Roelofs	4:26
12.	"On Suicide"	Bertolt Brecht, Hanns Eisler	3:42
Total length:			74:04

==== Personnel ====
- Tim Hodgkinson – organ, alto saxophone, clarinet (track 12), voice (track 5), tapes
- Fred Frith – guitar, xylophone, tubular bells, violin, piano (track 7)
- Lindsay Cooper – bassoon, oboe, jaw harp, flute, piano (tracks 3–5), accordion (track 5)
- Georgie Born – bass guitar, cello
- Dagmar Krause – voice (track 1,3,7,12)
- Chris Cutler – drums, contact microphone amplification (tracks 5–7)

===== Guests =====
- Geoff Leigh – tenor saxophone (tracks 10–11)
- Annemarie Roelofs – trombone (tracks 10–11)

==== Track notes ====
- Tracks 1–3 were recorded on cassette from the audience at Wandsworth Town Hall, London, 13 February 1977, live mix by Jack Balchin
- Track 4 was recorded on cassette from the audience at De Plek, Vlissingen, 22 May 1977, live mix by Jack Balchin
- Tracks 5–7 were recorded on cassette from the audience at Salle des Fetes, Chaumont, 25 November 1976, live mix by Jack Balchin
- Tracks 8–11 were recorded on cassette from the audience at Melkweg, Amsterdam, 16 December 1977, live mix by Jack Balchin
- Track 12 was from an unidentified cassette recording, probably May/June 1977

=== Volume 8: Bremen ===
Extracts from a live radio broadcast on Radio Bremen for New Jazz Live on 22 March 1978.

Henry Cow perform here as a quintet of Hodgkinson/Frith/Cooper/Born/Cutler; Dagmar Krause had left the band the previous November due to ill health. "Armed Maniac/Things We Forgot" is a titled improvisation with references "in ambience" to contemporary classical composers Krzysztof Penderecki and György Ligeti. New Suite is a Fred Frith composition that includes "Van Fleet", a pun on Don Van Vliet, and an instrumental version of Tim Hodgkinson's "Viva Pa Ubu". "Viva Pa Ubu" is a song that had been recorded, with the whole group singing, during (what became) the Hopes and Fears recording sessions in January 1978, and was the start of a musical production by Hodgkinson of Alfred Jarry's play Ubu Roi (Pa Ubu being a character in the play). It was later released on the Recommended Records Sampler and re-released as a bonus track on the CD reissue of Western Culture. Die Kunst Der Orgel is a 34-minute improvisation that ends with an instrumental version of Tim Hodgkinson's "Erk Gah".

==== Track list ====
No.	Title	Writer(s)	Length
1.	"Armed Maniac/Things We Forgot"	Georgina Born, Lindsay Cooper, Chris Cutler, Fred Frith, Tim Hodgkinson	11:55

New Suite
No.	Title	Writer(s)	Length
2.	"Van Fleet"	Frith	1:49
3.	"Viva Pa Ubu instrumental extract"	Hodgkinson	4:35
4.	"The Big Tune Begins"	Frith	0:45
5.	"The Big Tune Continues"	Frith	2:11
6.	"The Big Tune Ends"	Frith	1:30
7.	"March"	Frith	3:46

Die Kunst Der Orgel
No.	Title	Writer(s)	Length
8.	"Bremen": 8. "Part 1"; 9. "Part 2"; 10. "Part 3"; 11. "Part 4"; 12. "Part 5"	Born, Cooper, Cutler, Frith, Hodgkinson	34:25
13.	"Erk Gah instrumental extract": 13. "Part 1"; 14. "Part 2"	Hodgkinson	13:04
Total length:			74:07

==== Personnel ====
- Tim Hodgkinson – organ, alto saxophone, clarinet, mbira, voice (track 9)
- Fred Frith – guitar, tubular bells, marimba (track 8), xylophone (track 14), violin, piano (track 7)
- Lindsay Cooper – bassoon, oboe, sopranino saxophone, recorder, piano (tracks 9–11,14), accordion, egg-slicer
- Georgie Born – bass guitar, cello
- Chris Cutler – drums, marimba (tracks 9–10), piano (tracks 1,14)

==== Track notes ====
- Recorded for New Jazz Live at a public concert at Sendesall, Studio F, Radio Bremen, 22 March 1978, produced by Bernd Meier, concert mix by Jack Balchin

=== Volume 9: Late ===
A collection of performances from June and July 1978, plus Henry Cow's set at the inaugural Rock in Opposition Festival in March 1978.

"Joy of Sax" is a saxophone trio of Lindsay Cooper, Tim Hodgkinson and David Chambers from the Orckestra, which was a merger of Henry Cow, the Mike Westbrook Brass Band and folk singer Frankie Armstrong that took place in 1977. "Jackie-ing", also featuring Chambers, is a Westbrook arrangement of a Thelonious Monk composition that the Orckestra had performed. "The Herring People" is a Fred Frith instrumental he wrote to "counterbalance" the increasingly complex Hodgkinson and Cooper compositions. It was later recorded by Henry Cow during the July and August 1978 Western Culture sessions, but was only released for the first time, as "Waking Against Sleep", on the 1990 CD re-issue of Frith's solo album, Gravity (1980). It was also recorded by Curlew under the title "Time and a Half", and appeared on their album, North America (1985), which was produced by Frith.

The improvisation "RIO" and Cooper's "Half the Sky" was Henry Cow's set at the inaugural Rock in Opposition (RIO) festival that took place on 12 March 1978 at the New London Theatre. RIO was a collective of "progressive" bands that were united in their opposition to the music industry. Henry Cow initiated the movement and the other inaugural members, who also performed at the concert, were Stormy Six (Italy), Samla Mammas Manna (Sweden), Univers Zero (Belgium) and Etron Fou Leloublan (France). Dusted Magazine described Henry Cow's "RIO" improvisation at this event as "one of their most cacophonous and cataclysmic".

Cooper's "Half the Sky", which had been recorded in January 1978 at Sunrise in Switzerland and was later released on Western Culture, was named for Chairman Mao's dictum "Women hold up half the sky". "Virgins of Illinois" is another piece from the Brass Band's repertoire, and is a medley of several English folk songs that becomes a "broad dance in three". Piekut noted that the recording of "Virgins of Illinois" on this disc is not the complete piece as it was performed live – it stops before the song's main tune begins.

==== Track list ====
No.	Title	Writer(s)	Length
1.	"Joy of Sax"		3:50
2.	"Jackie-ing"	Thelonious Monk arr. Mike Westbrook	1:15
3.	"Untitled 2"	Lindsay Cooper	1:32
4.	"The Herring People"	Fred Frith	2:07
5.	"RIO": 5. "Part 1"; 6. "Part 2"; 7. "Part 3"; 8. "Part 4"	Georgina Born, Cooper, Chris Cutler, Frith, Tim Hodgkinson	17:09
9.	"Half the Sky"	Cooper	5:05
10.	"Virgins of Illinois"	trad.	2:13
11.	"Viva Pa Ubu"	Hodgkinson	2:18
Total length:			35:33

==== Personnel ====
- Tim Hodgkinson – organ, alto saxophone, clarinet, voice (track 7)
- Fred Frith – guitar, violin, xylophone
- Lindsay Cooper – bassoon, oboe, recorder, sopranino saxophone
- Georgie Born – bass guitar, cello
- Chris Cutler – drums

===== Guests =====
- Annemarie Roelofs – trombone (tracks 4,10)
- Dave Chambers – saxophone (tracks 1,2)

==== Track notes ====
- Tracks 1–4,10 are from an audience recording commonly believed to be from the Festa del PdUP (Partito di Unità Proletaria) in Monza, Italy, 9 July 1978, though this is disputed by Chris Cutler; live concert mix by E. M. Thomas; also 'disputable' is track 4, "The Herring People", which is believed to be an alternate mix (less reverb) of the recording "Waking Against Sleep" on the CD reissue Fred Frith's Gravity (cd ESD 1990), credited as a studio recording from the Western Culture sessions (see this talk page)
- Tracks 5–9 are from the Rock in Opposition Festival at New London Theatre, Drury Lane, London, 12 March 1978, recorded by Hasse Bruniusson of Samla Mammas Manna, live concert mix by Jack Balchin
- Track 11 was recorded on cassette from the audience at Cervia, 23 July 1978, live concert mix by E. M. Thomas

=== Volume 10: Vevey (DVD) ===
A 75-minute video of Henry Cow performing in Vevey, Switzerland in August 1976, recorded for the Swiss TV program, Kaleidospop. This is the only known video recording of Henry Cow.

The DVD features the group live outdoors on the grass and playing a set that was representative from the time. It includes Tim Hodgkinson's two "epic" compositions, "Living in the Heart of the Beast" and "Erk Gah", and two improvisations, "Vevey 1" and "Vevey 2". "Beautiful As ...", followed later by "Terrible As ..." are based on "Beautiful as the Moon – Terrible as an Army with Banners" from In Praise of Learning (1975).

François Couture at AllMusic described the multi-camera work on the DVD as "pretty good" and the editing "dated", but added that "seeing the band in action, both navigating through its most complex material and engaging in collective improvisation, is quite an experience." Frith said in a 2008 interview that after watching the video he was "blown away by how complicated the music was, and how assured and tight the band sounded. You can only do that by working and working and working".

==== Track list ====
No.	Title	Writer(s)	Length
1.	"Beautiful As ..."	Chris Cutler, Fred Frith	6:50
2.	"Vevey 1"	Georgina Born, Lindsay Cooper, Cutler, Frith, Tim Hodgkinson, Dagmar Krause	8:49
3.	"Terrible As ..."	Cutler, Frith	2:19
4.	Untitled (Tim speaks)		1:04
5.	"No More Songs"	Phil Ochs arr. Frith	3:48
6.	"LITHOTB"	Hodgkinson	16:57
7.	"Vevey 2"	Born, Cooper, Cutler, Frith, Hodgkinson, Krause	13:51
8.	"March"	Frith	2:42
9.	"Erk Gah"	Hodgkinson	18:28
Total length:			75:16

==== Personnel ====
- Georgie Born – bass guitar, cello
- Lindsay Cooper – bassoon, oboe, recorder, sopranino saxophone, piccolo, piano
- Chris Cutler – drums
- Fred Frith – guitar, violin, xylophone, piano, tubular bells
- Tim Hodgkinson – organ, alto saxophone, clarinet
- Dagmar Krause – voice

==== Track notes ====
- Recorded 25 August 1976, Vevey, Switzerland, concert mixed by Joel Schwartz

== Bonus CD ==
=== A Cow Cabinet of Curiosities ===
A limited edition CD given to subscribers of the box set. The title alludes to the name of Bob Drake's band, Cabinet of Curiosities.

"Pre Virgin Demo 1/2" include fragments that were later incorporated into tracks on Legend. "Lovers of Gold" is an alternate version of "Beginning: The Long March" from In Praise of Learning that was created by Chris Cutler. "The Glove" is derived from raw material recorded during the Unrest sessions.

==== Track list ====
No.	Title	Writer(s)	Length
1.	"Pre Virgin Demo 1"	mostly Fred Frith	3.55
2.	"Pre Virgin Demo 2"	mostly Tim Hodgkinson	1:02
3.	"Unidentified Improvisation 1"	Lindsay Cooper, Chris Cutler, Frith, John Greaves, Hodgkinson	1:30
4.	"Unidentified Improvisation 2"	Cooper, Cutler, Frith, Greaves, Hodgkinson, Dagmar Krause	5:37
5.	"Unidentified late composition"	probably Cooper	2:04
6.	"Exploded Amygdala/Teen Introduction"	Cutler, Frith, Greaves, Hodgkinson, Geoff Leigh	3:37
7.	"Lovers of Gold"	Cooper, Cutler, Frith, Greaves, Hodgkinson, Krause	6:29
8.	"Hamburg 6"	Cooper, Cutler, Frith, Greaves, Hodgkinson, Krause	5:33
9.	"Ruins extract"	Cooper, Cutler, Frith, Greaves, Hodgkinson, Krause	8:24
10.	"Hamburg 7"	Cooper, Cutler, Frith, Greaves, Hodgkinson, Krause	9:44
11.	"Half the Sky"	Cooper	5:03
12.	"Extract from The Glove"	Cooper, Cutler, Frith, Greaves, Hodgkinson	2:19
Total length:			56:15

==== Personnel ====
- Chris Cutler – all tracks, piano (track 10), voice (track 12)
- Fred Frith – all tracks, voice (track 12)
- Tim Hodgkinson – all tracks, voice (track 12)
- John Greaves – tracks 1–10,12, voice (track 12)
- Geoff Leigh – tracks 1,2,6, voice (track 1)
- Lindsay Cooper – tracks 3–5,7–12, voice (track 12)
- Dagmar Krause – tracks 4,7–10
- Peter Blegvad – clarinet (track 7)
- Anthony Moore – mounted and amplified tuning forks (track 7)

==== Track notes ====
- Tracks 1,2 were recorded in Henry Cow's rehearsal space by Jack Balchin, probably 1972
- Tracks 3–6 were extracted from a forgotten tape from 1975 to 1977 which surfaced while this box set was being compiled
- Track 7 is an out-take from In Praise of Learning mixed by Tim Hodgkinson at Cold Storage in 1984; previously issued on the 1991 CD (remixed) edition of In Praise of Learning
- Tracks 8–10 were recorded at a public concert for NDR Jazz Workshop, Hamburg, 26 March 1976
- Track 11 recorded at a public concert at Sendesaal, Studio F, Radio Bremen, 22 March 1978, produced by Bernd Meier
- Track 12 is an extract from an Unrest out-take mixed by Tim Hodgkinson at Cold Storage in 1984; previously issued in full (6:35) on the 1991 CD edition of Unrest

== Works cited ==
- Cutler, Chris, ed. (2009a). "The Road: Volumes 1–5". The 40th Anniversary Henry Cow Box Set (box set booklet). Henry Cow. London: Recommended Records.
- Cutler, Chris, ed. (2009b). "The Road: Volumes 6–10". The 40th Anniversary Henry Cow Box Set (box set booklet). Henry Cow. London: Recommended Records.
- Piekut, Benjamin (2019). Henry Cow: The World Is a Problem. Duke University Press. ISBN 978-1-47800-405-9.
