= Unrest (Henry Cow album) =

Studio album by Henry Cow
- Released: May 27, 1974
- Recorded: 14–28 February; 23 March – 2 April 1974
- Studios: The Manor (Shipton-on-Cherwell, England)
- Genres: Avant-rock, avant-garde jazz
- Length: 40:08
- Label: Virgin (UK)
- Producer: Henry Cow

Henry Cow chronology
Legend (1973)	Unrest (1974)	Desperate Straights (1975)

Unrest is an album by British avant-rock group Henry Cow, recorded at Virgin Records' Manor studios in February and March 1974. It was their second album and was released in May 1974. It was their first album including oboe and bassoon player Lindsay Cooper, who replaced saxophonist Geoff Leigh. American critic Glenn Kenny said Cooper's presence on the album grounded the band in European art music.

Unrest was dedicated to Robert Wyatt and Uli Trepte.

== Content ==
When Henry Cow began recording Unrest, they found they did not have enough composed material to fill the LP. Because of studio time constraints, they were forced to "improvise" and developed a "studio composition" process that involved improvising to tape, tape manipulation, loops, layering and overdubbing. The balance of the LP (tracks 2 to 5 on side 2) were "composed" in this manner. On parts of "Ruins" and "Linguaphonie", the bassoon, alto saxophone, drums and voice were recorded at half or double speed.

For "Ruins", Fred Frith used Fibonacci numbers to establish beat and harmony, after reading about Hungarian composer Béla Bartók's use of the Fibonacci series. Frith said to make "Ruins" "somewhat classical-sounding" he included violin, bassoon and xylophone, but later regretted having played violin "so badly" on the track. Frith remarked, "it would be interesting to have another shot at it with [violinist] Carla Kihlstedt", but added "I doubt if I'll ever have the energy or motivation to go that far".

Frith said that his composition "Bittern Storm over Ulm" was a "perversion" of one of his favourite Yardbirds songs, "Got to Hurry" (1965), into which he added bars, beats and half-beats. Live performances of this piece were released on Henry Cow's "Road" box set under different names ("Heron Shower over Hamburg" in London in April 1974, and "Brain Storm over Barnsley" in Amsterdam in December 1977). "Solemn Music" was from Henry Cow's music for John Chadwick's production of Shakespeare's The Tempest, and is the only piece from that suite to be released. "Upon Entering the Hotel Adlon" refers to the Hotel Adlon in Berlin and the German "high society" who frequented it in the mid-1930s. The vocal/piano piece at the end of "Deluge" is sung and played by John Greaves, and is an extract from his song "Don't Disturb Me", which Henry Cow had performed in 1972.

== Cover art ==
The album cover art work was by artist Ray Smith and was the second of three of his "paint socks" to feature on Henry Cow's albums, the first being on Legend (1973). Unrest's "sock" was also used on the cover of Benjamin Piekut's 2019 book, Henry Cow: The World Is a Problem.

== CD reissues ==
In 1991 East Side Digital Records issued the album on CD with poor sound quality and two bonus tracks, "The Glove" and "Torchfire" (derived from raw material recorded during the Unrest sessions). A remixed version of "Bittern Storm over Ulm" appeared as "Bittern Storm Revisited" on The Last Nightingale EP in 1984. An excerpt of "The Glove" was later reissued on the 2009 40th Anniversary Henry Cow Box Set bonus CD, A Cow Cabinet of Curiosities, and "Torchfire" on the 2019 Henry Cow Box Redux: The Complete Henry Cow bonus CD, Ex Box – Collected Fragments 1971–1978.

In 1999 Recommended Records and East Side Digital issued a remastered version of Unrest on CD with the bonus tracks omitted.

== LP reissues ==
In 2010 Recommended Records released a 180g vinyl, limited (1000 copies) edition (RERVHC2LP) of Unrest, mastered from the 1999 CD edition.

== Reception ==
Professional ratings
Review scores
Source	Rating
AllMusic	4.5/5 stars
Christgau's Record Guide	A−
Music Story	4/5 stars
The Rolling Stone Album Guide	3/5 stars
Spin Alternative Record Guide	9/10
Sputnikmusic	5/5 stars

=== Initial ===
Reviewing the album in Melody Maker in June 1974, Steve Lake called it "a great record" and "more unified and coherent" than Legend. He described Unrest as "a kind of mood cycle" that starts with "optimism, working through arid wastes that suggest hopelessness and dejection ... and ending on a note of hope with the sound of an orchestra tuning up". Lake said the LP's second side is "neither spontaneous improvisation nor 'straight' music" and "defies classification". He saw Henry Cow's "unsuppressable ... humour" on "Linguaphonie" as "cock[ing] a snook at Stockhausen". Lake stated that Unrest is "a unique statement" that "owes allegiance to nobody", and concluded: "I love this music. Approach it open-minded and you can too". Robert Christgau, who was notably unfavorable to most progressive rock, gave the album a very positive review, writing: "this demanding music shows up such superstar "progressives" as Yes for the weak-minded reactionaries they are." He noted that on "Bittern Storm Over Ulm", which was based on the Yardbirds' "Got to Hurry", "they break the piece down, almost like beboppers" instead of "quoting sixteen bars with two or three instruments, thus insuring their listeners another lazy identification". Despite criticizing the "second-rate" saxophone and some flirtations with "cheap swing", he concludes that the band "is worthy of its classical correlatives—Bartok, Stockhausen, and Varese rather than Tchaikovsky and predigested Bach."

=== Retrospective ===
In a review for AllMusic, Rick Anderson described Unrest as "one of Henry Cow's better efforts". He called "Bittern Storm Over Ulm" a "brilliant demolition" of "Got to Hurry" by the Yardbirds, and liked the "stately" "Solemn Music" with its "atonal but pretty counterpoint between Frith and Cooper". Anderson felt that the improvised material is "more spotty", but was impressed by "Deluge" and the way it demonstrated how well the group could negotiate the "fine ... line ... between bracing free atonality and mindless cacophony". A staff reviewer on Sputnikmusic gave the album a perfect score, writing that it "consistently progresses through unexpected levels of musicianship and creativity but never gets lost in its own mire. It's one of those albums that'll start off a track with a jazz ballad, then take five or so minutes to transform it into some sort of warped rock tune (think '60s and '70s rock music, deconstructed then thrown together so the pieces don't quite fit snugly) then, by the end, will make you wonder not only where you are but also how you got there." "Overall," he concludes, "Unrest is a hidden gem, one that transcends and earns all its grating moments because they're all in service of bizarrely beautiful ones."

American critic Glenn Kenny wrote in Trouser Press that side one of Unrest comprises "some of the most full-bodied music Cow ever put on record." He added, that "while not entirely worthless", the group's experiments in musique concrète on the album's second side are not "nearly as compelling as the three superior compositions" on the first side.

In 1996, Rolling Stone critic Neil Strauss included the album on his list of the "100 Most Influential Alternative Albums" of all time. In 2014, Fact ranked it the 15th best album of the 1970s, writing:

Unrest's compositions are knotty, labyrinthine and sometimes extremely noisy. But Unrest's magic lies in its grace and softness. These are tricksy compositions painted in soft autumnal shades – dancing oboes on 'Half Asleep / Half Awake', lowing horns on 'Ruins (Part 2)’, Fred Frith’s birdsong impressions on 'Torch Fire'. With some seriously top-drawer players (Tim Hodgkinson, Chris Cutler, the unimpeachable Fred Frith), it’s a pamphlet’s width away from muso territory, but always stays just on the right side of indulgent. Not the most immediate album here, for sure, but let Unrest work on you, and you’ll be rewarded many times over.

== Track listing ==
All music is composed by Henry Cow except where noted.

Side one
No.	Title	Writer(s)	Length
1.	"Bittern Storm over Ulm"	Fred Frith	2:44
2.	"Half Asleep; Half Awake"	John Greaves	7:39
3.	"Ruins"	Frith	12:00

Side two
No.	Title	Writer(s)	Length
4.	"Solemn Music"	Frith	1:09
5.	"Linguaphonie"		5:58
6.	"Upon Entering the Hotel Adlon"		2:56
7.	"Arcades"		1:50
8.	"Deluge"		5:52

1991 CD re-issue bonus tracks
No.	Title	Length
9.	"The Glove"	6:35
10.	"Torchfire"	4:48

== Personnel ==
Henry Cow

- Tim Hodgkinson – Farfisa organ, piano, alto saxophone, clarinet
- Fred Frith – stereo guitar, violin, xylophone, piano
- John Greaves – bass guitar, piano, voice
- Chris Cutler – drums
- Lindsay Cooper – bassoon, oboe, recorder, voice

Production

- Phil Becque – recording engineer, mixing engineer (side 1)
- Andy Morris – recording engineer
- Mike Oldfield – recording engineer (part of "Ruins")
- Henry Cow – mixing engineers (side 2), producers
- Ray Smith – cover art
- Matt Murman – remastered 1999 CD reissue

== See also ==
- The Virgin Years – Souvenir Box (1991)
- Henry Cow Box (2006)

== Works cited ==
- Cutler, Chris, ed. (2009). "The Road: Volumes 1–5". The 40th Anniversary Henry Cow Box Set (box set booklet). Henry Cow. London: Recommended Records.
- Piekut, Benjamin (2019). Henry Cow: The World Is a Problem. Duke University Press. ISBN 978-1-47800-405-9.
- Romano, Will (2014). Prog Rock FAQ: All That's Left To Know About Rock's Most Progressive Music (e-book ed.). Milwaukee, Wisconsin: Backbeat Books. ISBN 978-1-61713-587-3.
