= Ruins (instrumental) =

1974 instrumental written by Fred Frith for Henry Cow

Instrumental by Henry Cow

from the album Unrest
- Released: May 1974
- Recorded: February–March 1974
- Studio: The Manor, Oxfordshire, England
- Genre: Avant-rock; progressive rock
- Length: 12:00
- Label: Virgin
- Composer: Fred Frith
- Producer: Henry Cow

"Ruins" is a 1974 instrumental composed by Fred Frith for the English avant-rock group Henry Cow. It was recorded in February and March 1974 by Henry Cow, and released on their May 1974 album, Unrest by Virgin Records.

A jazz interpretation of "Ruins" was recorded by the Michel Edelin Quintet with spoken texts by John Greaves and released on their 2019 album, Echoes of Henry Cow.

== Development ==
In 1970 Frith and John Greaves began developing a piece they later called "Teenbeat". It became a collection of instrumental fragments and ideas the two had been working on. Some of these fragments took on a life of their own and evolved into free-standing compositions. One of them was Frith's "With the Yellow Half-Moon and Blue Star"; the other was "Ruins". On "Ruins" Frith used Fibonacci numbers to establish beat and harmony. He had been reading about Hungarian composer Béla Bartók's use of the Fibonacci series and its 55-beat sequence to structure compositions. Fibonacci numbers are related to the golden ratio found in some patterns in nature; the numbers are also sometimes used in art and architecture. Frith said the idea of the palindromic structure of rhythmic patterns in the middle of the piece came from French composer Olivier Messiaen.

Frith scored "Ruins" for violin, bassoon and xylophone to make it "somewhat classical-sounding", but later regretted having played violin "so badly" on the track. He wrote that "[n]either my violin nor my xylophone skills were remotely good enough to get it close to where it should have been." But he added that the "obvious deficiencies in the writing" were overcome by group's "energetic conviction" which revealed "unexpected qualities" in the work. Frith remarked, "it would be interesting to have another shot at it with [violinist] Carla Kihlstedt", but added "I doubt if I'll ever have the energy or motivation to go that far".

The recording of "Ruins" took place in stages because at the time the group had yet to familiarize themselves with the piece. Chris Cutler later commented, "We should have delayed [Unrest]. But we were sure the challenge would 'bring out the best' in us." Benjamin Piekut wrote in his 2019 book Henry Cow: The World Is a Problem, "To this day, the Cows wince when they hear the flubs sprinkled throughout ['Ruins']." Part of the end of "Ruins", played at half-speed, also appears in "Deluge", the final track on Unrest; the drums and bass have been removed and it fades in slowly, loops several times, then fades out again.

"Ruins" was later remixed by Tim Hodgkinson at Cold Storage Studios in London in 1984, and was released by East Side Digital Records on the first CD release of Unrest in 1991. All subsequent CD releases of Unrest by East Side Digital and Recommended Records restored the original mix.

"Ruins" featured in many of Henry Cow's live sets. In early performances, for example in the 25 April 1974 John Peel Show, (Note: The 25 April 1974 John Peel set appears in Volume 2: 1974–5 of The 40th Anniversary Henry Cow Box Set.) they often split the piece in two, playing the first part, jumping to Greaves' "Half Asleep; Half Awake", then returning to the last part of "Ruins". This was generally followed by Frith's "Bittern Storm over Ulm". The setlist of the Peel session is given as "Pidgeons:[sic] Ruins/Half Awake Half Asleep/Bittern Storm Over Ulm". In a paper in Representations, Piekut states that it is unclear whether "Pigeons" is the name of a suite of songs, "Ruins", "Half Asleep; Half Awake" and "Bittern Storm over Ulm", or an introduction to "Ruins" that does not appear on Unrest. (Note: See the track "Introduction" in Volume 2: 1974–5 of The 40th Anniversary Henry Cow Box Set.) Piekut concluded that "Pigeons" may be neither of those two, but simply the working title of several song fragments the band had been working on at the time.

== Composition and structure ==
Frith wrote "Ruins" shortly before, and during, the recording of Unrest. It comprises seven sections:

1. Introduction – organ drone with clarinets in close harmony and periodic bursts of piano and percussion.
2. Counterpoint – bass guitar, percussion, organ, piano, xylophone and bassoon in a theme taken from parts of Frith's "Teenbeat" and "With the Yellow Half-Moon and Blue Star".
3. "Ruins" cycle – organ solo for seven 55-beat cycles over a two-chord pattern (E-11-13 and D-11-13) by piano, bass guitar and percussion alternating six times according to 6–4, 5–3, 3–2, 7–3, 7–3 and 4–8.
4. Chamber music – a series of movements by violin and bass-bassoon, bassoon and violin-bass, xylophone-bass-drums and bassoon-violin, all interspaced with a 55-beat cycle fanfare of wind instruments, followed by a stereo guitar solo over the fanfare.
5. Violin melody – 55-beat cantus firmus by violin with counterpoint by oboe, piano and bass guitar, oboe again, drums.
6. Guitar melody – distorted and sustained guitar with counterpart by clarinet, bass guitar and percussion, organ.
7. Coda – guitar drone with clarinets in close harmony.

The composition is symmetrical, in that the second half of the piece mirrors the first. In the middle of the fourth section the composition "flips ... and the structure goes into reverse", repeating the "Ruins" cycle with a guitar solo, followed by a new melody and finishing with a guitar drone, in contrast with the organ drone that opens the piece.

Garmo said "Ruins" is polyrhythmic with varying metres, including 1/16, 1/8 and 1/4. It also comprises themes that are revisited throughout the piece. Piekut described "Ruins" as "sprawled" but "intuitive" having "two solos around a chamber music core" with "the whole thing bracketed by rock intro and outro". Piekut said Hodgkinson used a fuzzbox with a fuzz control on his H&H amplifier during his organ solo in the "Ruins" cycle. He also made use of a noise gate to create the "sputtering kind of broken sustain". Frith's stereo guitar configuration was the same he had used during Henry Cow's Greasy Truckers Live at Dingwalls Dance Hall recording.

Hodgkinson has stated that "Ruins" was the only composition Frith wrote for Henry Cow that was recorded unchanged. Generally all compositions presented to Henry Cow by its members were modified by the group.

== Reception ==
In a review of Unrest in Exposé, Peter Thelen called "Ruins" "[t]he album's gem". He described it as "a brilliant 'chamber' piece" that leaves the listener wondering "is it composed or improvised?" John Kelman called "Ruins" "epic". Reviewing The 40th Anniversary Henry Cow Box Set at All About Jazz, Kelman said the piece's tone is different in Volume 2: 1974–5 when performed with "Half Asleep; Half Awake" embedded. But he complimented Frith on his guitar playing, particularly on prepared guitar, which he maintained places him "alongside Derek Bailey for sheer audacity and textural unpredictability."

Writing in The Music's All that Matters: A History of Progressive Rock, Paul Stump described Henry Cow's "emotional range" on "Ruins" as "symphonic":

At the serene heart of the long and funereal [instrumental], the horns gravely soliloquise while the viola contributes its own sorry narrative in the misty chromatic landscape. Percussion tickles and goads the two instruments. Frith's gentle violin and viola work further dispels notions that Cow music was exclusively abrasive and discursive; there is languour here, too.

== Live performances ==
"Ruins" was performed live by Henry Cow a number of times between 1974 and 1978, including:

- 25 April 1974 on the John Peel Show in London; broadcast by the BBC on 9 May 1974
  - Released in Volume 2: 1974–5 of The 40th Anniversary Henry Cow Box Set
- May 1975 during three European concerts
- 13 October 1975 in Udine, Italy
  - Released in Concerts
- 26 March 1976 at the NDR Jazz Workshop in Hamburg, Germany
  - Released on A Cow Cabinet of Curiosities in The 40th Anniversary Henry Cow Box Set
- September and November 1976 in Italy and France
- May and June 1977 in Sweden and Southend-on-Sea, England
- September, November and December 1977 in Italy, France and the Netherlands
- June and July 1978 in France and Italy

== Works cited ==
- Cutler, Chris, ed. (2009). "The Road: Volumes 1–5". The 40th Anniversary Henry Cow Box Set (box set booklet). Henry Cow. London: Recommended Records.
- Garmo, Trond Einar (2020). Henry Cow: An Analysis of Avant Garde Rock. London: ReR Megacorp / November Books. ISBN 978-0-95601-84-4-1.
- Romano, Will (2014). Prog Rock FAQ: All That's Left To Know About Rock's Most Progressive Music (e-book ed.). Milwaukee, Wisconsin: Backbeat Books. ISBN 978-1-61713-587-3.
- Piekut, Benjamin (Fall 2015). "Pigeons". Representations. 132 (1). University of California Press: 112–120. doi:10.1525/rep.2015.132.1.112. ISSN 0734-6018. JSTOR 10.1525/rep.2015.132.1.112.
- Piekut, Benjamin (2019). Henry Cow: The World Is a Problem. Duke University Press. ISBN 978-1-47800-405-9.
- Stump, Paul (2010). The Music's All that Matters: A History of Progressive Rock. Chelmsford, England: Harbour Books. ISBN 978-1-905128-10-5.
