= Henry Cow: The World Is a Problem =

2019 book by Benjamin Piekut

- First edition book cover
- Author: Benjamin Piekut
- Cover artist: Ray Smith
- Language: English
- Subject: Henry Cow
- Genre: Biography, music criticism
- Publisher: Duke University Press
- Publication date: September 27, 2019
- Publication place: United States
- Media type: Print (hardcover and softcover)
- Pages: 512
- ISBN: 978-1-4780-0405-9 (hardcover)
- Dewey Decimal: 781.66092/2—dc23
- LC Class: ML3916 .P53 2019

Henry Cow: The World Is a Problem is a 2019 book by American academic Benjamin Piekut. It is a biography and analysis of the English experimental rock group Henry Cow and their turbulent existence between 1968 and 1978. The book is Piekut's second and was published in September 2019 in the United States by Duke University Press in both hard- and soft-cover.

Piekut analyses Henry Cow's music, their political stance and how they functioned as a collective. He sourced material for the book from interviews with members of the band and their notebooks and diaries, from magazine and newspaper articles, and from journal papers and books. The World Is a Problem was generally well received by reviewers, although one found sections of the book "heavy going", and another felt it should have addressed issues like "why Henry Cow thought their awkward and somewhat mannered music could ever be popular with audiences".

== Background ==
Piekut is a historian of experimental music and an associate professor of music at Cornell University in Ithaca, New York. He had previously written Experimentalism Otherwise: The New York Avant-Garde and Its Limits (2011), had edited Tomorrow Is the Question: New Directions in Experimental Music Studies (2014), and co-edited with George E. Lewis Oxford Handbook of Critical Improvisation Studies (2016). Piekut has also published several papers on Henry Cow, including "Music for Socialism, London 1977" (2019), and "Another Version of Ourselves: The Enigmas of Improvised Subjectivity" (2018).

Piekut sourced the content of The World Is a Problem from interviews (published and unpublished), notebooks and diaries, magazine and newspaper articles, journal papers, and books. He conducted his own interviews between 2011 and 2016 with all living members of Henry Cow and those associated with the band, and was granted access to personal archives of several players, including Fred Frith, Tim Hodgkinson, Chris Cutler, Lindsay Cooper and Peter Blegvad. Piekut wrote in the book's Preface that where written records and memories disagreed, "only by reading many of them together and against one another has it been possible to determine what actually happened with any accuracy." (Note: Cutler remarked that where Piekut had to interpret different people's accounts of events, it is likely that not everyone in the band will concur with his analysis. Cutler said that "subjectivities are profoundly complex", and attempts to "unearth things that were already hidden when they were current" will be "guided by [personal] biases and interests".) (Note: Frith said "I learned a lot about memory" while working with Piekut, "how we each remembered things differently ... not emotions or atmospheres, but facts!" Frith complimented Piekut on the book's "meticulously martialled and researched 'facts'", but added that "something is missing – it doesn’t feel like us, a lot of the humor is missing, the surreal escapades, the extraordinary generosity of folks who remain close friends to this day.")

The sock painting on the book's cover is by artist Ray Smith and was originally used on the cover of Henry Cow's second album, Unrest (1974). Piekut took the book's subtitle, "The World Is a Problem" from a statement Hodgkinson made in one of his notebooks, paraphrasing Paulo Freire in Pedagogy of the Oppressed, that Henry Cow wants to "transform the world; the world is a problem, not a given".

== Synopsis ==
The World Is a Problem chronicles the history of Henry Cow and their exploration of music and activism, from their inception in 1968 to their break-up in 1978. It explains how Henry Cow were at odds with the status quo, the music industry and the world at large. They were politically outspoken and embraced Marxism and Maoism. They were not content to settle and continually experimented with new ideas. The brief merger with Slapp Happy in 1975, the formation of the Orckestra with the Mike Westbrook Brass Band and folk singer Frankie Armstrong in 1977, and the establishment of the Rock in Opposition movement in 1978, were some of several ventures they initiated.

Henry Cow's approach to composing, including collective composition, is discussed. The musical structure and lyrics (where present) of many of their more prominent works, including Frith's "Ruins" and Hodgkinson's "Living in the Heart of the Beast", are also analysed in detail. The band improvised much of their music, particularly during live performances, and this style of playing included free improvisation, studio improvisation to tape (for example on their 1974 album, Unrest), and open improvisation. (Note: Piekut distinguishes between open and free improvisation; he defines the former as "improvisation without a plan or necessary telos", and the latter as "a narrower genre marker referring to John Stevens, Derek Bailey, and their European confreres".)

The book analyses of the nature of the band and the way they functioned. They were a collective with a strict work-ethic that demanded total commitment from its members. They held regular meetings where all aspects of the group, its music and activities were debated. This tended to suppress individualism, making the band more important than its members, which strained relationships within the group, and with partners on the outside.

To describe Henry Cow's internal conflict, Piekut coined the term "contraviviality", which he defines as "the adversarial relations" that result from "an improvisational stance of living that matched the musical form of [the group]'s modus operandi". Interactions between group members were functional, but cold and impersonal. Domestic matters were not discussed – the group was not the place to raise personal problems. Disagreements and disputes frequently surfaced in meetings, but were often left unresolved. Discord reached a head in early 1978 after the Sunrise recording sessions in Switzerland, which led to the band breaking up six months later.

The author noted that Georgie Born, one of the last members to join the group, described Henry Cow's collectivism as "a kind of distributed autism ... in which the enormous intellectual and human potential of the individuals ... were not matched by the quality of the encompassing everyday relationships across the ... totality of the group". Piekut asserted that Henry Cow "held themselves together in an ongoing state of tension", and that they believed that "struggle, hardship, and contention" were necessary for "aesthetic success".

== Reception ==
Reviewing Henry Cow: The World Is a Problem in the British progressive rock magazine, Prog, Sid Smith called it an "impressively detailed account [that] chronicle[s] [Henry Cow's] triumphs and camaraderie". He added that through their "often-turbulent existence", the band's struggle "against the prevailing tides of commerciality and popular culture ... has a heroic quality about it". Smith wrote that if the success of a music biography is measured by the desire to revisit the group's albums, then this book is "enormously successful". He said Piekut's "forensic examination" of Henry Cow's recordings adds another dimension to their music. Smith concluded that the book "is a fitting tribute to Henry Cow's importance and legacy in a notable but marginalised movement of 20th-century music."

Phil Howitt wrote in the Canterbury scene magazine, FaceLift that while Henry Cow may not have been part of the Canterbury scene, Piekut's book can be read as "almost a parallel narrative to that of the Canterbury scene", given the number of musicians from that "genre" who either played in, or were associated with, the band. Howitt described The World Is a Problem as a "definitive biography" that is "meticulously researched" leaving few stones unturned. He said that just as Henry Cow were "an intensely serious band", this is an "intensely serious book" that requires "considerable powers of concentration and assiduousness". Howitt found the analyses of their different types of improvisation and their political alignments "heavy going". He also felt that the in-depth descriptions of some of the band's compositions were "somewhat unnecessary" as they would only benefit a limited audience. What was also missing, Howett felt, was a timeline of events covering Henry Cow's history. But overall Howett called The World Is a Problem "a remarkable project" that is "compelling [and] unique".

In a review of the book in The Free Jazz Collective, Phil Stringer wrote that Piekut has written a "fascinating and immensely readable account" of Henry Cow and the "remarkable music" they created in response to the world they found themselves in. He noted how Piekut highlights the contradictions that result from a collective attempting to balance the pursuit of an ideal and the practicalities of daily living. Stringer felt that the book could do with a chronology and a discography, but added that revisiting the band's music was rewarding and felt that it "remains as relevant [today] as it did in the 1970s". Stringer concluded that Piekut's The World Is a Problem made him think of Nietzsche's statement in Thus Spoke Zarathustra: "One must still have chaos in oneself to give birth to a dancing star", and stated that Henry Cow's experiments in collective music "gave birth to many dancing stars".

Rupert Loydell was a little more critical of the book. In a review published in Punk & Post-Punk, he described Piekut as "an interesting critic" who "doesn’t do much more than arrange and re-present information ... in a highly readable manner". Loydell said the book is "a coherent and engaging history of one of the strangest and off-the-wall bands of the late twentieth century", but added that it "doesn't ... show the band in a good light". It reveals how Henry Cow were inclined to "take themselves ... way-to-seriously" and were unable to "empathize with each other" or "understand opposing points-of-view". Personal issues were "anathema" to them and they felt no qualms about sacrificing individuals "for the communal good". Loydell stated that Henry Cow "were political in the extreme", which pervaded their music and the way they conducted themselves, but felt that, "[i]n the end they would pretty much implode from their political ambition and discourse, along with their personal social ineptitudes". Loydell added that the book's afterword "feels like an aside" and does not address issues like "why Henry Cow thought their awkward and somewhat mannered music could ever be popular with audiences".

Reviewing the book in Jazz Journal, Nic Jones called Piekut's analysis of Henry Cow, "borderline forensic", and his "attention to detail ... exemplary", but felt that the author focuses too much on their music and the "rigours of the road", and neglects the "human" side of the band, for example their "dogged determination" to keep going. Jones said Henry Cow's music was always difficult to categorize. They "stretched the rock form" beyond many progressive rock bands of the day, many of whom relied and capitalized on "received virtuosity". Jones concluded that one of the book's "lasting impression[s]" is that Henry Cow's "very existence was a strong and deep-running spur", and that the "cult followings" its members continue to receive shows that "'difficult' music has and probably always will be the stuff of cults."

== Works cited ==
- Loydell, Rupert (February 2020). "Book Reviews – Henry Cow: The World Is a Problem, Benjamin Piekut (2019)". Punk & Post-Punk. 9 (1). Intellect: 127–152. doi:10.1386/punk_00024_5. ISSN 2044-1983. S2CID 242410327 – via EBSCO's Academic Search Ultimate.
- Piekut, Benjamin (2019a). Henry Cow: The World Is a Problem. Duke University Press. ISBN 978-1-47800-405-9.
