= East Side Digital Records =

American record label

East Side Digital
- Parent company: NorthSide
- Founded: 1981
- Founder: Rob Simonds
- Distributor: Alternative Distribution Alliance
- Genre: Rock; Experimental; Alternative country
- Country of origin: U.S.
- Location: Minneapolis, Minnesota

East Side Digital is a record label and distributor based in Minneapolis, Minnesota.

== History ==
ESD was started and curated by Rob Simonds (who also created Rykodisc) in 1981 to import and distribute vinyl records on Japanese labels to record stores and other retailers.

In 1982, ESD became one of the first U.S. distributors of compact discs, soon releasing records by rock and experimental performers on the ESD label.

Subsequently, Ryko Distribution Partners took over ESD's distribution duties, allowing ESD to primarily be a record label.

ESD is now a sub-label of NorthSide Records, a label Simonds created that specializes in Nordic roots music.

Due to the advent of streaming and downloads of digital music, ESD has reduced operations to only offering music by local band Halloween, Alaska.

== Artists ==
This section contains a partial list of artists who released records on the ESD label.

=== A–F ===
- Eric Ambel
- Terry Anderson
- Laurie Anderson
- Marc Anderson
- The Barracudas
- The Beacon Hill Billies
- Peter Blegvad
- Blood Oranges
- The Bottle Rockets
- William S. Burroughs
- Dirk Campbell
- Wendy Carlos
- Bruce Cockburn
- Eller Lynch
- Fred Frith

=== G–N ===
- Go to Blazes
- John Giorno
- David Greenberger
- Halloween, Alaska
- Happy the Man
- Henry Cow
- Suzi Katz
- Kit & Coco
- Kevin Kling
- Cheri Knight
- The Liquor Giants
- Bill Lloyd
- Scott McCaughey
- The Minus 5
- Dirk Mont Campbell
- The Morells
- National Health

=== P–Z ===
- The Pandoras
- Glenn Phillips
- Plan 9
- The Residents
- Schramms
- Shakin' Apostles
- Jane Siberry
- The Skeletons
- Snakefinger
- Sneakers
- Spanic Boys
- Speed the Plough
- Chris Stamey
- They Might Be Giants
- Kit Watkins
- Barrence Whitfield with Tom Russell
- Wooden Leg
- The Young Fresh Fellows

== See also ==
- List of record labels
