= Erk Gah =

2008 avant-rock song written by Tim Hodgkinson for Henry Cow

Song by Henry Cow

from the album The 40th Anniversary Henry Cow Box Set
- Released: September 2008; January 2009
- Recorded: 25 August 1976, Vevey, Switzerland; 9 May 1977, Stockholm, Sweden; 22 March 1978, Bremen, West Germany
- Genre: Experimental rock; progressive rock
- Length: 18:28 (Vevey); 16:46 (Stockholm); 13:04 (Bremen)
- Label: Recommended
- Songwriter(s): Tim Hodgkinson
- Producer(s): Henry Cow

"Hold to the Zero Burn, Imagine"

Song by Tim Hodgkinson

from the album Each in Our Own Thoughts
- Released: 1994
- Recorded: 1993
- Studio: Wolf Studios, London
- Genre: Experimental rock; progressive rock
- Length: 16:43
- Label: Woof
- Songwriter(s): Tim Hodgkinson
- Producer(s): Tim Hodgkinson

"Erk Gah" (later retitled "Hold to the Zero Burn, Imagine") is a song written by Tim Hodgkinson for the English experimental rock group Henry Cow. "Erk Gah" was performed live by the band between 1976 and 1978, but was never recorded in the studio; three live performances of the song would later be released on the live album Stockholm & Göteborg in 2008 and the compilation The 40th Anniversary Henry Cow Box Set in 2009. In 1993, fifteen years after Henry Cow disbanded, Hodgkinson recorded the composition under the title "Hold to the Zero Burn, Imagine" for his solo album Each in Our Own Thoughts (1994), featuring former Henry Cow members Chris Cutler, Lindsay Cooper, and Dagmar Krause.

"Erk Gah" was the second of two "epic" compositions that Hodgkinson wrote for Henry Cow, the first being "Living in the Heart of the Beast" from In Praise of Learning (1975).

== Development ==
Hodgkinson wrote the lyrics and music for "Erk Gah" in mid-1976. It is a seventeen-minute, "12-tone, atonal" extended song that he described as "dry, astringent, angular, with no compromise to rock music". Known for his "complicated" compositions for Henry Cow (such as "Amygdala" from Legend and "Living in the Heart of the Beast" from In Praise of Learning), "Erk Gah" was initially a challenge for the group to learn, but by the end of 1976 they had performed it live several times. Hodgkinson's initial set of lyrics takes the form of a soliloquy by a character awaiting execution.

In December 1976 Hodgkinson requested that "Erk Gah" be withdrawn from the band's repertoire until he could rewrite the lyrics. The rest of the group, however, felt that it should remain on their set list while awaiting the new lyrics, and they continued to perform it live. In July 1977 the group, already having made anti-capitalist statements in their music, wanted to make an anti-fascist statement to "critique the rightist elements" in the burgeoning punk rock movement; it was suggested that "Erk Gah"'s new lyrics should reflect this stance. In January 1978, as Henry Cow prepared to depart for Switzerland to record their next album, Hodgkinson presented his revised lyrics to the group. The rest of the group rejected the new lyrics, and asked drummer Chris Cutler to write a third set of lyrics. Cutler was unable to do so in the short period of time left before the recording sessions were due to begin, and "Erk Gah" was not recorded.

Henry Cow continued to perform "Erk Gah" live several times in 1978, though rearranged as an instrumental due to vocalist Dagmar Krause's departure from the group. They returned to the studio in July 1978 to record their final album, Western Culture, but "Erk Gah" was again not recorded. Henry Cow disbanded soon after the recording sessions.

In 1993 Hodgkinson – along with Krause, Cutler, and former Henry Cow woodwind player Lindsay Cooper – recorded "Erk Gah" with his original lyrics as "Hold to the Zero Burn, Imagine" for his solo album Each in Our Own Thoughts. However, in 2008 he would state that "in retrospect I far prefer the Cow version to the later studio version."

== Title ==
When Henry Cow guitarist Fred Frith first saw the sheet music for the then-untitled piece, he exclaimed "Erk Gah", a nonsense expression used by Don Martin in his cartoons for Mad magazine. "Erk Gah" thus became the composition's provisional title, and had not been changed by the time the group disbanded in 1978. Hodgkinson retitled it "Hold to the Zero Burn, Imagine" for its recording in 1993.

== Composition and structure ==
"Erk Gah" is a fully notated, eighteen-minute twelve-tone serialist work comprising five large movements linked to five sections of text. In his 2019 book Henry Cow: The World Is a Problem, musicologist Benjamin Piekut wrote that Hodgkinson built the piece around the vocal melody, unlike his earlier long-form piece "Living in the Heart of the Beast" which had its lyrics and vocal melody added last. Hodgkinson described the piece as "a wild, shifting, fluid chaos of transient forms"; Piekut states that "tonal, textural, and rhythmic elements mutate often throughout the work".

The first movement of the piece summarizes musical styles and motifs that appear in the subsequent movements. Piekut notes that here Hodgkinson presents "an oscillating figure that marks the entire piece; often appearing in the voice, this figure has Krause rocking back and forth between two pitches". Also present is "a rhythmic figure in which successive beats are divided into an increasing or decreasing number of attacks", or "acceleration or deceleration [that] takes place inside a steady tempo". The second movement begins with the trial of the song's protagonist and narrator. Here the timbre and texture of the work changes, which now features "contrapuntal relations among the various instruments". Cello, flute, saxophone, organ, and guitar are heard in "a twelve-tone pitch space that refuses any tonal center".

In the third movement, the narrator reflects on the optimism of the past, and the music "re-centers around E, a tritone up from the B-flat tonal center" that the piece began with. Krause sings "long melodies in a pitch sequence from the first movement" that soon begins oscillating between C and B♭. Piekut stated that Hodgkinson "modulates the meter and tempo such that Krause's voice remains un-disturbed while the rhythms shift erratically underneath". In the next movement the narrator experiences "loss and nothingness", and this is the only movement that does not start with singing. Piekut described this section as having a "chamber music feel, with many instruments offering atomistic and brittle gestures that cohere at times into unison lines". In this movement Hodgkinson "introduces a new rhythmic motive shared by all but heard frequently in the bass with an oscillating tritone". The final movement, in which the narrator expresses "fury", brings the work to a close with "long tones in the bass that support counterpoint between organ and voice".

Piekut concludes that "Erk Gah" "holds little converse with rock convention" and "sounds more like modernist chamber music scored mainly for amplified instruments". He adds that "[t]here is very little repetition and no single drumbeat to speak of" in the piece, although there are recurrent "eruptive squeals" suggestive of free jazz.

== Reception ==
In a review of the archival Henry Cow live album Stockholm & Göteborg in Clouds and Clocks, Beppe Colli felt that "Erk Gah" was too similar to "Living in the Heart of the Beast", and found Krause's vocals "bordering on kitsch in [their] emphasis", but praised the piece's final instrumental movement. François Couture of AllMusic considered the Stockholm & Göteborg recording "a tour de force of complex avant-garde rock" in his review of the album.

== Live performances ==
Henry Cow never recorded "Erk Gah" in the studio, but did perform it live between 1976 and 1978:

- 25 August 1976 in Vevey, Switzerland for the Swiss TV program Kaleidospop (the only known video recording of Henry Cow)
  - Released on DVD in Volume 10: Vevey of The 40th Anniversary Henry Cow Box Set
- September and November 1976 in Italy and France
- 9 May 1977 in Stockholm, Sweden for the Sveriges Radio program, Tonkraft, broadcast on 8 June and 11 June 1977
  - Released on Volume 6: Stockholm & Göteborg of The 40th Anniversary Henry Cow Box Set; also released on a separate CD in September 2008 in advance of the box set release, making it the first officially Henry Cow recording of "Erk Gah"
- May and June 1977 in Sweden and Southend-on-Sea, England
- November and December 1977 in France and the Netherlands
- January 1978 in Switzerland
- 22 March 1978 in Bremen, West Germany for Radio Bremen (instrumental version)
  - Released on Volume 8: Bremen of The 40th Anniversary Henry Cow Box Set

== Personnel ==
=== "Hold to the Zero Burn, Imagine" (1994) ===
- Tim Hodgkinson – keyboards, alto saxophone, clarinet
- Dagmar Krause – lead vocals
- Chris Cutler – drums
- Bill Gilonis – electric guitar
- Lindsay Cooper – bassoon
- Richard Bolton – cello
- Guy Segers – bass guitar
- Dominic Weeks – xylophone
- Nancy Ruffer, Clarissa Melville – flute
- Jonathan Impett – trumpet

== Works cited ==
- Cutler, Chris, ed. (2009a). "The Road: Volumes 1–5". The 40th Anniversary Henry Cow Box Set (box set booklet). Henry Cow. London: Recommended Records.
- Cutler, Chris, ed. (2009b). "The Road: Volumes 6–10". The 40th Anniversary Henry Cow Box Set (box set booklet). Henry Cow. London: Recommended Records.
- Piekut, Benjamin (2019). Henry Cow: The World Is a Problem. Duke University Press. ISBN 978-1-47800-405-9.
