= Pragma (album) =

Studio album by Tim Hodgkinson
- Released: 1998
- Recorded: 1996–1998
- Genres: Experimental music; contemporary classical music; electronic music
- Length: 58:44
- Label: Recommended (UK)
- Producer: Tim Hodgkinson

Tim Hodgkinson chronology
Each in Our Own Thoughts (1994)	Pragma (1998)	Sang (2000)

Pragma: New Works is a 1998 solo album by English experimental music composer and performer Tim Hodgkinson. It is his third solo album, after Each in Our Own Thoughts (1994), and comprises six pieces composed by Hodgkinson and recorded between 1996 and 1998. The album was released on CD in 1998 by Recommended Records in the United Kingdom.

== Reception ==
Professional ratings
Review scores
Source	Rating
AllMusic	3/5 stars

In a review of the album in The Wire, Julian Cowley wrote that while Pragma sounds very different to the "acerbic rock" Hodgkinson played in the Work, it is "a sustained anatomisation of [his] musical taste, an illumination of how he plays and ... hears.^{[italics in the source]} He said the six compositions can be compared to the works of established composers, for example Morton Subotnick on "Interferogram". Cowley noted that, as on his previous solo album, Each in Our Own Thoughts (1994), Pragma shows Hodgkinson "pushing back the limits of his identity as a composer, in a post-classical sense". He added that Hodgkinson's musical explorations here are characterised "by the kind of vitality and intelligence that always preclude descent to the merely derivative."

François Couture wrote in a review of the album at AllMusic that while the compositions on Pragma have "impetus" and "ardor", they are not "memorable". "For Looking Inside" has some "interesting textures", and "Mala; Elated" has "good idea[s] that takes on cataclysmic proportions", but Couture felt that overall they are "not enough to salvage the album from its self-sufficient aura".

Reviewing Pragma in Exposé, Jeff Melton called the album's music "difficult" because he felt that "the listener must have the discipline to hear the 'big picture' and not get caught in a scattering of perceived dissonant ideas." Melton said the voices on "SHHH" create "a disturbing, almost ghostly mood", and described "For Looking Inside" as "controlled mayhem" that is "definitely not for the faint of heart". Melton stated that he is waiting for the horror film industry to discover the potential in Hodgkinson's music, but added it is more likely he "will still languish with others who only appeal to a small, but educated audience."

== Track listing ==
All music is composed by Tim Hodgkinson.

No.	Title	Length
1.	"Repulsion" (for clarinet, electric guitar, brass instruments, percussion; 1997)	10:23
2.	"SHHH" (for taped voices; 1996–1997)	7:19
3.	"For Looking Inside" (for 3 prepared violas; 1997)	10:32
4.	"Interferogram" (for instrumental ensemble; 1997)	10:09
5.	"Mala; Elated" (for clarinet, harpsichord, organ, metal plates, cymbals; 1997)	8:23
6.	"Black Death and Errors in Construction" (for bass clarinet, prepared piano, electric guitar, 2 cellos, 2 violas, percussion, tape; 1998)	11:58

== Track notes ==
- "SHHH" includes extracts from Ana-Maria Avram's Archae, plus random voices recorded on location in public spaces. The track is dedicated to Kay Rala Xanana Gusmao.
- Samples of Marion Coutts' trumpet were used in some of the tracks.

== Personnel ==
- Tim Hodgkinson – clarinet, guitar, percussion, viola, harpsicord, organ, piano, cello, tape, samples
- Charles Mutter – violin ("Interferogram")
- Albert Markos – cello ("Black Death and Errors in Construction")

=== Production ===
- Tim Hodgkinson – producer, liner notes
- Tom Lubbock – liner notes
- Spartak Chernish – cover photography
