= Slow Crimes =

Studio album by The Work
- Released: April 1982
- Recorded: September 1981 – January 1982
- Studio: Cold Storage Studios, London; Surrey Sound Studios, Leatherhead, London; Sunrise Studios, Kirchberg, Switzerland; 50 Rue De Rittweger, Brussels, Belgium
- Genre: Post-punk; avant-prog; art rock; experimental music
- Length: 39:30
- Label: Woof (UK)
- Producer: The Work

The Work chronology
Slow Crimes (1982)	Live in Japan (1982)

Slow Crimes is a 1982 studio album by English post-punk rock group the Work. It is their debut album and was recorded between September 1981 – January 1982 in London, Switzerland and Belgium. It was released on LP in April 1982 by Woof Records in the United Kingdom, and follows on from "I Hate America" / "Fingers & Toes" / "Duty", their first single recorded and released in 1981.

Slow Crimes was reissued in 1992 on CD by Megaphone Records in the United States with four extra tracks: the three tracks from the band's first single, plus "Houdini", originally released in 1982 on the Recommended Records Sampler.

== Reception ==
Professional ratings
Review scores
Source	Rating
All About Jazz	favourable
AllMusic	3/5 stars
Record Collector	2/5 stars

In a review in AllMusic, Rick Anderson described Slow Crimes as avant-garde in a "very distinctively British way". He said Tim Hodgkinson's "warbly, watery, unsteady" vocals define the album's mood, while Catherine Jauniaux's voice is "good, squeaky fun". Anderson liked "Balance" with its "frenetic polka-like punkiness", and called "Brickyard"'s "exploration of multi-layered percussion and guitar sounds" the best track. Anderson was critical of some of the other tracks, calling "Flies" and "State Room" "rather boring [and] aimless". He also felt that what the Work did here had already been done, and better, by Hodgkinson's former band Henry Cow.

In a more positive review in All About Jazz, Nic Jones noted punk rock's influence on the album. He complimented the "[s]onic extremism and genetically modified funk" on "State Room" and "Do It", stating that "rarely have [they] been brought together so effectively". Jones added that "Le Travail" evokes the atmosphere of Henry Cow's Western Culture, and "Pop" suggests "some kind of interface" between the Work and British post-punk band the Slits.

Reviewing Slow Crimes in Record Collector, Tim Peacock wrote that just as Henry Cow operated outside the confines of rock music, the Work have done the same on this album, making it "a punishing listening experience". He felt that while the "prowling, angular" "Cain & Abel" and the "atmospheric" "Le Travail" "rise above the morass", the rest of the album suffers from the group's "ill-disciplined art-pop leanings".

== Track listing ==
=== 1982 LP release ===
All tracks composed by the Work.

Side A
No.	Title	Length
1.	"Nearly Empty"	2:55
2.	"Balance"	2:10
3.	"Pop"	4:42
4.	"Flies"	2:22
5.	"Like This"	2:53
6.	"Knives"	3:27

Side B
No.	Title	Length
7.	"Cain & Abel"	4:11
8.	"State Room"	3:24
9.	"Brickyard"	4:37
10.	"Do It"	2:18
11.	"Le Travail"	3:34
12.	"Maggot Song"	2:57

Sources: Liner notes, Discogs.

=== 1992 CD release bonus tracks ===
All tracks composed by the Work.

Side B
No.	Title	Length
13.	"I Hate America"	5:50
14.	"Fingers & Toes"	2:50
15.	"Duty"	1:00
16.	"Houdini"	3:55

Sources: Liner notes, Discogs.

== Personnel ==
- Bill Gilonis – guitar, bass guitar, euphonium, Jew's harp, vocals
- Mick Hobbs – bass guitar, guitar, drums, recorder, ukulele, vocals
- Tim Hodgkinson – Hawaiian guitar, saxophone, keyboards, vocals
- Rick Wilson – bass guitar, drums, vocals

=== Guests ===
- Catherine Jauniaux – vocals (tracks 3,7,11,12)

Sources: Liner notes, Discogs.

=== Sound and artwork ===
- Tracks 1, 4, 6, 10–12 recorded and mixed at Cold Storage Studios, London
  - Engineer – Peter Bullen
  - Additional engineering – Charles Bullen
- Tracks 3, 7–9 recorded and mixed at Surrey Sound Studios, Leatherhead, London
  - Engineer – Chris Gray
- Tracks 2, 5, 16 recorded and mixed at Sunrise Studios, Kirchberg, Switzerland
  - Engineer – Etienne Conod
  - Additional engineering – Bubu Steiner
- Track 3 (first part) recorded and mixed at 50 Rue De Rittweger, Brussels, Belgium
  - Engineer – Maggie Thomas
- Tracks 13–15 recorded and mixed at Rossiter Rd, London
  - Engineer – The Work
- Production – The Work
- Cover art – Mick Hobbs

Sources: Liner notes, Discogs.
