= Live in Japan (The Work album) =

Live album by The Work
- Released: 1982
- Recorded: 29 June 1982
- Venue: Okasa Koseinenkin Kaikan Middle Hall, Osaka, Japan
- Genre: Post-punk; art rock; experimental music; free improvisation
- Length: 35:25
- Label: Recommended (Japan)

The Work chronology
Slow Crimes (1982)	Live in Japan (1982)	The Worst of Everywhere (1983)

Live in Japan is a 1982 live album by English post-punk rock group the Work. It is their second album and was recorded in Osaka, Japan on 29 June 1982. It was released on LP later in 1982 by Recommended Records in Japan, and follows on from their debut album, Slow Crimes, released earlier in 1982 by Woof Records in the United Kingdom. Live in Japan was reissued in 2006 on CD by Ad Hoc Records in the United States with one extra track: "I Hate America", taken from the band's first single in 1981.

After the Work recorded Slow Crimes in early 1982, Mick Hobbs and Rick Wilson left the quartet, and the remaining members, Tim Hodgkinson and Bill Gilonis formed a touring version of the Work with Amos (Jim Welton) and Chris Cutler to fulfil concert commitments in Japan. They performed three shows in Tokyo and one in Osaka in June 1982, performing material mostly from Slow Crimes. The concert in Osaka was the only one recorded, and this was done using a cassette recorder half-way down the hall; the tape was later remastered using a graphic equaliser and a DBX expander. After the Japanese tour the Work split up.

== Reception ==
Professional ratings
Review scores
Source	Rating
AllMusic	Favourable
Maelstrom	8/10 stars

A review of Live in Japan in AllMusic noted how the Work used the instruments at their disposal to "explore (and in some cases dismantle)" pieces from their earlier records. It described the improvisations on their set as "stunning in both … spontaneity and … aggression".

Reviewing the 2006 CD release of the album in Maelstrom, Avi Shaked said this re-issue gives the respect this "adventurous but rather poorly documented band" deserves. He felt that the less-than-perfect sound quality of the recording emphases the "underground, experimental and punchy" nature of the band. Shaked found Live in Japan, with its "fuzzy bass lines, bizarre guitar lines … and half-frantic, half-delusional vocals", a "bent experience" reminiscent of Gong. He added that while it can be a little "exhaust[ing]", it still "challenge[d] the underground scene's nonconformist".

Philip Clark wrote in The Wire that the Work introduced "unheralded level[s] of rhythmic complexity to punk". In a review of Live in Japan, he said "[t]he music feels infinitely malleable as the fragmented rhythmic flow concertinas and hits accumulative climaxes like the best free jazz". He added that Hodgkinson's singing "has a controlled, snarling mania". Clark was amused by the concert's "hilariously buttoned-up" audience who sounded like they were at a Franz Schubert piano recital.

== Track listing ==
All tracks composed by Tim Hodgkinson, Bill Gilonis, Mick Hobbs and Rick Wilson, unless otherwise stated.

=== 1982 LP release ===
Side A
No.	Title	Length
1.	"State Room"	3:40
2.	"Like This"	3:01
3.	"Fingers & Toes"	3:02
4.	"Pop"	4:40
5.	"Crabs" (Hodgkinson)	4:29

Side B
No.	Title	Length
6.	"Duty"	2:10
7.	"Cain & Abel"	3:50
8.	"Do It"	2:16
9.	"Putting a New String on the Hawaiian Guitar" (Chis Gray, Hodgkinson)	0:43
10.	"Flies" (Hodgkinson)	0:58
11.	"Benidorm" (Gilonis)	1:42
12.	"Night by the Sea" (Hodgkinson, Gilonis)	4:54

Sources: Liner notes, Discogs.

=== 2006 CD release bonus tracks ===
Side B
No.	Title	Length
13.	"I Hate America"	5:10

Sources: Liner notes, Discogs.

== Personnel ==
- Bill Gilonis – guitar, backing vocals, tenor saxophone (track 13)
- Tim Hodgkinson – Hawaiian guitar, saxophone, organ, lead vocals
- Chris Cutler – drums, electric drums
- Amos (Jim Welton) – bass guitar, background voices, announcements

Sources: Liner notes, Discogs.

=== Sound and artwork ===
- Tracks 1–12 recorded at the Okasa Koseinenkin Kaikan Middle Hall in Osaka, Japan
  - Recorded with a cassette recorder by Masae Nishimura half-way down the hall
  - Live mixed by Chris Gray
  - Remastered by the Work using a graphic equaliser and a DBX expander at Hanamoto Studio in Tokyo, Japan
  - CD release remastered by Udi Koomran at Ginger Studio, Tel Aviv
- Track 13 recorded and mixed at Rossiter Rd, London
  - Engineered by the Work
- Liner notes – Chris Cutler
- Cover art – Chris Cutler

Sources: Liner notes, Discogs.
