= Each in Our Own Thoughts =

Studio album by Tim Hodgkinson
- Released: 1994
- Recorded: 1993
- Genres: Avant-rock; electronic music; contemporary classical music
- Length: 52:50
- Labels: Woof (UK), Megaphone (US)
- Producer: Tim Hodgkinson

Tim Hodgkinson chronology
Splutter (1985)	Each in Our Own Thoughts (1994)	Pragma (1998)

Each in Our Own Thoughts is a 1994 solo album by English experimental music composer and performer Tim Hodgkinson. It is his second solo album, after Splutter (1985), and comprises six unreleased pieces composed by Hodgkinson between 1976 and 1993. They were recorded in 1993 and co-released in 1994 on CD by Woof Records in the United Kingdom and Megaphone Records in the United States.

== Content ==
Each in Our Own Thoughts consists of three instrumental pieces and three songs. The music varies from contemporary classical music to avant-rock: there is a string quartet ("String Quartet 1"), two works for small ensembles ("A Hollow Miracle" and "Palimpsest"), a piece for samples and multiple horns ("From Descartes' Dreams"), a piece for MIDI-instruments ("Numinous Pools for Mental Orchestra"), and an unrecorded Henry Cow number from 1976 ("Hold to the Zero Burn, Imagine"). Hodgkinson composed the music for all the tracks and wrote the lyrics for "Hold to the Zero Burn, Imagine"; Chris Cutler wrote the song texts for "A Hollow Miracle" and "Palimpsest". Hodgkinson does not perform on "String Quartet 1".

"Hold to the Zero Burn, Imagine" was originally composed by Hodgkinson for Henry Cow as "Erk Gah" in 1976 and was performed regularly by the band between 1976 and 1978. It was scheduled to be recorded in Switzerland in early 1978 for their next album, but objections from some of the band members over its revised lyrics resulted in it being shelved. Henry Cow broke up in mid-1978 and "Erk Gah" was never recorded in the studio. Three live recordings of "Erk Gah" appear in The 40th Anniversary Henry Cow Box Set (2009).

The recording of "Hold to the Zero Burn, Imagine" in 1993 (with the original "Erk Gah" lyrics) was a Henry Cow reunion of sorts in that four of the musicians that played on this track were from the original band: Tim Hodgkinson, Chris Cutler, Lindsay Cooper and Dagmar Krause.

== Reception ==
Professional ratings
Review scores
Source	Rating
Babyblaue Seiten	12/15 stars
Exposé	favourable

In a review in Exposé, Mike Borella called Each in Our Own Thoughts "an important and invigorating release" that is a "high-water mark for RIO alumni". He said that despite its mix of "avant-garde, post-classical [and] structurally complex music", it remains "cohesive in itself", and "is a must" for Henry Cow fans. Borella felt that although the "synergy of group composition" is lacking, he gave the album his "[h]ighest recommendation".

== Track listing ==
1. "A Hollow Miracle" (Hodgkinson, Cutler) – 4:18
2. "String Quartet 1" (Hodgkinson) – 11:09
3. "From Descartes' Dreams" (Hodgkinson) – 6:32
4. "Hold to the Zero Burn, Imagine" (Hodgkinson) – 16:43
5. "Palimpsest" (Hodgkinson, Cutler) – 4:13
6. "Numinous Pools for Mental Orchestra" (Hodgkinson) – 9:55

Source: Liner notes.

=== Track notes and personnel ===
1. Composed in 1993 around texts by Chris Cutler.
  - Dagmar Krause – voice
  - Tim Hodgkinson – piano, viola, bass guitar, sampling, sequencing
2. The first of four pieces for strings composed in Grenoble, France in 1993.
  - Charles Mutter – violin
  - Chris Brierley – violin
  - Helen Kamminga – viola
  - Robert Woollard – cello
3. An oratorio derived from "Three Dreams of Descartes", a larger work composed in 1991 in which a philosopher's rational self confronts personal demons.
  - Tim Hodgkinson – bass clarinet, clarinet, alto saxophone, sampling, sequencing
4. Composed for Henry Cow in 1976 as "Erk Gah" and performed in concerts by the band in 1976–1978, but never recorded in studio.
  - Dagmar Krause – voice
  - Chris Cutler – drums
  - Bill Gilonis – guitar
  - Lindsay Cooper – bassoon
  - Richard Bolton – cello
  - Guy Segers – bass guitar
  - Dominic Weeks – xylophone
  - Nancy Ruffer – flute
  - Clarissa Melville – flute
  - Jonathan Impett – trumpet
  - Tim Hodgkinson – keyboards, alto saxophone, clarinet
5. Composed in 1992 around texts by Chris Cutler.
  - Dagmar Krause – voice
  - Nancy Ruffer – flute
  - John Impett – trumpet
  - Raúl Díaz – French horn
  - Guy Segers – bass guitar
  - Tim Hodgkinson – piano, percussion
  - Rick Wilson – percussion
6. Composed in 1986 for a real orchestra and later recorded on a computer and revised for MIDI-instrumentation.
  - Tim Hodgkinson – sequencing

Source: Liner notes.

== Production ==
- Tracks 1, 3, 4 and 5 recorded and mixed by Dominique Brethes at Wolf Studios, London
- Track 2 recorded live at Bottolph Clayden by Tim Hodgkinson
- Track 6 recorded direct to DAT from MIDI-instruments by Tim Hodgkinson
