= Henry Now =

English avant-rock group

- Origin: United Kingdom
- Genres: Experimental music; free improvisation
- Years active: 2022–present
- Spinoff of: Henry Cow
- Members: Fred Frith; Tim Hodgkinson; Chris Cutler; John Greaves

Henry Now are an experimental music and free improvising group based in the United Kingdom, and comprises some of the former members of Henry Cow, namely Fred Frith, Tim Hodgkinson, Chris Cutler, John Greaves and Annemarie Roelofs. They have performed in several European countries, including Italy, the Czech Republic and Spain, and featured guest musician Annie Barbazza in their first concert.

== History ==
Since the demise of Henry Cow in 1978, the members have kept in touch and performed together from time to time. In 2006, Frith, Hodgkinson and Cutler played at The Stone in New York City (stressing that "This is not Henry Cow"), and in 2014, Henry Cow reunited to perform three concerts in memory of their bassoonist, Lindsay Cooper who had died earlier that year.

In 2022, Greaves proposed to Frith, Hodgkinson and Cutler that they play at a concert Italian musician and producer Max Marchini had organised for his birthday party in Piacenza, Italy. The promoter suggested that they use the name "Henry Now", which Frith, Hodgkinson and Greaves agreed to, although Cutler said he did not like it. In an article in The Wire Clive Bell wrote that "the key is in the name, serving as a reminder that this [Henry Now] is not a nostalgia project". Frith stated that there will be "[n]o old songs, no new material, it will be improvised", but added "the point of Henry Now, is that it could develop into whatever we feel like and with whomever is available."

Henry Now's first concert in Piacenza in November 2022 was followed by another in Palermo, Italy the next day, then two in the Czech Republic in November 2023, and in Barcelona, Spain in January 2024. Their first concert featured guest musician Annie Barbazza, an Italian singer and pianist with whom Greaves had previously collaborated, while the group's 2024 Barcelona concert included Annemarie Roelofs, Henry Cow's violinist and trombonist. Greaves did not play in the Barcelona concert. Despite Frith saying there would be "no old songs" in Henry Now, their first concert did feature several songs sung by Barbazza, including Slapp Happy's "Casablanca Moon", and Robert Wyatt's "Little Red Riding Hood Hit the Road".

On 18 November 2025, Marchini's Italian avantgarde label Dark Companion released Then Again, an album of extracts from Henry Now's live performances at Piacenza and Palermo in November 2022. The material was edited and mixed by Frith and Hodgkinson, and two different versions were released, one on LP, and the other on CD.

== Concerts ==
Henry Now have performed live at the following concerts:

Date	Venue	Henry Now	Guests	Refs
18 November 2022	Teatro President, Piacenza, Italy	Fred Frith, Tim Hodgkinson, Chris Cutler, John Greaves	Annie Barbazza	
19 November 2022	Sala Michele Perriera, Palermo, Italy	Frith, Hodgkinson, Cutler, Greaves		
6 November 2023	Národní dům, Trutnov, Czech Republic	Frith, Hodgkinson, Cutler, Greaves		
7 November 2023	Palác Akropolis, Prague, Czech Republic	Frith, Hodgkinson, Cutler, Greaves		
12 January 2024	L'Auditori, Barcelona, Spain	Frith, Hodgkinson, Cutler, Annemarie Roelofs		

== Reception ==
In a review of Henry Now's Prague concert on 7 November 2023 in the Czech cultural magazine, kulturní magazín UNI, Alex Švamberk wrote that their hour-long improvisation was rich and varied, with rhythms that were sometimes in harmony, and other times in counterpoint. He said it sounded "perhaps more classical" (možná klasičtěji) than Henry Cow's older recordings. After the concert, he asked what the piece's title was, and Frith jokingly suggested that Švamberk name it himself. The promoters had billed this concert as a "unique return of the most important figures of avant-garde rock", and Švamberk stated that this was not an exaggeration, "it was even better" (bylo to ještě lepší).

Reviewing the same concert in kulturní magazín UNI, Joseph Rauwolf said the group's improvised performance showed how far Frith, Hodgkinson, Cutler and Greaves have come since their days in Henry Cow. Rauwolf described Henry Now's music as "abstract" (abstraktní), and not unlike a soundtrack. He said it changed constantly with new ideas regularly surfacing, illustrating the musician's "tremendous qualities" (ohromné kvality). But Rauwolf felt that what was absent from their music were climaxes, which would have given it more structure. Rauwolf stated that while Henry Now is "an exceptional formation of great musicians" (výjimečnou formací skvělých muzikantů), they are not as relevant today as they were in the 1970s when they were continually expanding the boundaries of music.

Reviewing the 12 January 2024 Barcelona concert in the Spanish music magazine, Rockdelux, Quim Casas wrote that by changing just one of the letters in Henry Cow's name, Henry Now have stated that they are a new band that have evolved from the old one. Casas said their concert was short, but focused, and demonstrated that they are just as relevant today as they were five decades ago. The hour-long improvisation was never static and full of surprises, and the four musicians did not have to look at each other to understand what each of them was doing. Casas noted that while they appeared "cold" (fríos) during their set, the humour from their time in Henry Cow was still there, the way they played their instruments and used them to communicate with the audience.

== Members ==
- Fred Frith – guitars, violin, electronics (2022–2024)
- Tim Hodgkinson – keyboards, saxophone, lap steel guitar, electronics (2022–2024)
- Chris Cutler – drums, percussion (2022–2024)
- John Greaves – bass guitar, vocals (2022–2023)
- Annemarie Roelofs – violin, trombone (2024)

Guests

- Annie Barbazza – vocals, piano (2022)

== Discography ==
- Then Again (2025, LP & CD, Dark Companion Records, Italy) – extracts from Henry Now's live performances at Piacenza and Palermo in November 2022; the editing and mixing is different on the LP and CD releases
