= Attwooll =

Attwooll is a surname. Notable people with the surname include:

- David Attwooll (1949–2016), British poet and publisher
- Elspeth Attwooll (born 1943), Scottish politician
