= Then Again (Henry Now album) =

Live album by Henry Now
- Released: 29 December 2025
- Recorded: 18 and 19 November 2022
- Venue: Teatro President, Piacenza, Italy; Sala Michele Perriera, Palermo, Italy
- Genre: Avant-rock; free improvisation
- Language: English
- Label: Dark Companion
- Producer: Henry Now

Then Again is a 2025 live album by experimental music and free improvising group Henry Now. It comprises extracts taken from recordings of two of the group's concert performances in Italy at Teatro President, Piacenza on 18 November 2022, and at Sala Michele Perriera, Palermo on 19 November 2022. The album was released on CD and LP in December 2025 by Italian musician and producer Max Marchini's record label, Dark Companion.

== Background ==
Henry Now was formed in 2022 by four of the former members of Henry Cow, namely Chris Cutler, Fred Frith, John Greaves and Tim Hodgkinson, to perform at Teatro President, Piacenza, Italy during the Musiche Nuove a Piacenza Festival on 18 November 2022. The occasion was to celebrate Italian musician and producer Max Marchini's 60th birthday. Then Again was derived from recordings made at this concert and their next live performance at the second Solo per Lelio (Only for Lelio) festival in Sala Michele Perriera, Palermo on 19 November 2022.

The editing and mixing of the CD and LP releases of Then Again are slightly different. The CD release has seven tracks, whereas the LP release has only six.

== Album cover ==
The CD and LP album cover art work is by Chris Cutler, which he described in the CD booklet:

In April 1649, Gerrard Winstanley, William Everard and some 30 or 40 men and women, Diggers and Levellers, began to cultivate crown land at St. George's Hill, Surrey with the intention of growing and distributing food without charge to all who joined them – and to encourage others to do the same around the country. Today St. George's Hill is a gated community of billionaires, oligarchs and shadowy entities registered in tax heavens.

== Reception ==
In a review of Then Again in Exposé, Peter Thelen found the album largely "quite interesting and engaging", with moments, as is often the case with free improvisation, when the group "struggles to get off the ground". Thelen stated that, "depending on your like or dislike of free improvisation, this could be an interesting diversion into unexpected musical worlds, or a quick trip through hell and back."

Reviewing the album in the Italian music magazine, Rockol, Franco Zanetti stated that Henry Now is not a Henry Cow reunion, and that on Then Again the four ex-Henry Cow members do not "recreate the past" (ricreare il loro passato), but drawing on fifty years of experience, "improvise the present" (improvvisare il presente). Zanetti added that Then Again "is proof that the old fire still burns" (prova che il vecchio fuoco arde ancora), and that it offers listeners unfamiliar with Henry Cow an introduction to one of the most important experimental music groups.

In the Colombian music magazine Rockaxis, Héctor Aravena Appelt wrote that the material on Then Again is new and improvised, and not Henry Cow nostalgia. He said Frith stated that Henry Now's purpose is to evolve into whatever way they want, and with anyone available. Appelt described the album's music as an "unpredictable musical continuum" (continuum musical impredecible). He said it is challenging, and without the comfort and security of repeated passages; often the music appears aimless, melodies come and go, and structures are created and dismantled. Appelt explained that the only thing that guides the four musicians is "instinct and sound exploration" (instinto y la exploración sonora).

== Track listings ==
All tracks composed by Cutler, Frith, Greaves and Hodgkinson.
All track titles as they appear in the CD and LP liner notes.

=== CD release ===
1. "Now Then Part I (cd version)"
2. "Now Then Part II (cd version)"
3. "Now Then Part III (cd version)"
4. "Now Then Part IV (cd version)"
5. "Now Then Part V (cd version)"
6. "Now Then Part VI (cd version)"
7. "Now Then Part VII (cd version)"

Source: CD liner notes

=== LP release ===
Side A

1. "Now Then (lp version) – Part I

Side B

1. "Now Then (lp version) – Part II
2. "Now Then (lp version) – Part III
3. "Now Then (lp version) – Part IV
4. "Now Then (lp version) – Part V
5. "Now Then (lp version) – Part VI

Source: LP liner notes

== Personnel ==
- Chris Cutler – drums, percussion
- Fred Frith – guitar, piano
- John Greaves – bass guitar, voice (spoken texts)
- Tim Hodgkinson – clarinet, lap steel guitar

=== Production and artwork ===
- Recorded live at Teatro President, Piacenza, Italy on 18 November 2022
  - Engineered by Alberto Callegari and Luca Frigo
- Recorded live at Sala Michele Perriera, Palermo, Italy on 19 November 2022
  - Engineered by Simone Sfameli
- Mixed and edited in July 2025 at Casa Pancio, Richmond, California by Fred Frith with Tim Hodgkinson
- Produced by Henry Now
- Executive production by Max Marchini and Massimo Orlandini
- Liner notes by Max Marchini and Chris Cutler
- Photography by Francesco Renne and Franz Soprani
- Cover art by Chris Cutler
- Spoken texts by Chris Cutler and Emily Dickinson (Note: Spoken texts in order of appearance, all by Chris Cutler, except "I Gained It So" by Emily Dickinson: "I Gained It So"; "The Song of the Monopolists"; "The Song of the Martyrs"; extract from "Alceste"; "Democracy"; "Law")
- Graphics by Max Marchini

Source: CD and LP liner notes
