= The Last Nightingale =

Studio album by various artists
- Released: November 1984
- Recorded: October 1984
- Genre: Avant-rock; spoken word
- Length: 15:12
- Label: Recommended (UK)

The Last Nightingale is an album by various artists recorded and released in 1984 to raise money for striking coal miners in the 1984–1985 UK miners' strike. It features Chris Cutler, Tim Hodgkinson and Lindsay Cooper from the English avant-rock group Henry Cow, singer and musician Robert Wyatt, and poet Adrian Mitchell. The cover artwork was done by British cartoonist and caricaturist Ralph Steadman.

All monies raised from the sale of the record, less the manufacturing costs, were given to the Miners Strike Fund. The artists, studio, record company and distributors waived their fees.

== Background ==
The project was initiated by Chris Cutler from Henry Cow, who enlisted the services of ex-band members Tim Hodgkinson and Lindsay Cooper. Also included was Robert Wyatt, who had performed with Henry Cow on several occasions, and Bill Gilonis who was from Hodgkinson's current band at the time, the Work.

The album, a 12-inch EP, was recorded at Hodgkinson's Cold Storage studios in Brixton, London, and was released on Cutler's own Recommended Records independent record label.

== Recording ==
"Moments of Delight" and "In the Dark Year" are two songs composed for this album by Tim Hodgkinson and Lindsay Cooper respectively, with texts by Chris Cutler. They were performed by Cooper, Hodgkinson, Cutler and Bill Gilonis, with Robert Wyatt singing, and were recorded on 29–31 October 1984 at Cold Storage.

"Back in the Playground Blues" and "On the Beach at Cambridge" are two poems by Adrian Mitchell from his book, On the Beach at Cambridge: New Poems (1984). Mitchell recites the poems, which were recorded on 21 October 1984 at Cold Storage.

"Bittern Storm Revisited" is a remix of Henry Cow's "Bittern Storm over Ülm" from their 1974 album, Unrest. It was remixed in 1984 at Cold Storage.

== Reception ==
Professional ratings
Review scores
Source	Rating
AllMusic	2.5/5 stars

Eugene Chadbourne in a review of the album at AllMusic called it an "expertly produced release". He said that it will appeal to fans of Henry Cow, who might also complain of the EP's brevity. Chadbourne remarked that it "all goes by very quickly", and likened it to "a greeting card with some inspired verse scribbled on it".

== Track listing ==
Side one
No.	Title	Artist	Length
1.	"Moments of Delight" (Cutler, Hodgkinson)	Cooper, Cutler, Gilonis, Hodgkinson, Wyatt	3:01
2.	"In the Dark Year" (Cutler, Cooper)	Cooper, Cutler, Gilonis, Hodgkinson, Wyatt	3:44

Side two
No.	Title	Artist	Length
3.	"Back in the Playground Blues" (Mitchell)	Poem recited by Mitchell	1:49
4.	"Bittern Storm Revisited" (Frith)	Henry Cow	2:16
5.	"On the Beach at Cambridge" (Mitchell)	Poem recited by Mitchell	4:22

== Personnel ==
- Chris Cutler (tracks 1,2,4) – drums
- Bill Gilonis (tracks 1,2) – guitar, bass guitar
- Lindsay Cooper (tracks 1,2,4) – piano, electric piano, sopranino saxophone, bassoon
- Tim Hodgkinson (tracks 1,2,4) – piano, electric piano, Moog synthesizer, baritone and alto saxophone
- John Greaves (track 4) – bass guitar
- Fred Frith (track 4) – guitar
- Robert Wyatt (tracks 1,2) – vocals
- Adrian Mitchell (tracks 3,5) – spoken voice

=== Sound and art work ===
- Tim Hodgkinson – engineer
- Bill Gilonis – engineer
- Ralph Steadman – front cover
- Graham Keatley – back cover
- Peter Blegvad – EP labels
