= Catherine Jauniaux =

Belgian avant-garde singer

- Born: Catherine Jauniaux
- Genres: Avant-garde, experimental
- Occupation: Musician
- Instrument: Singing
- Years active: 1977–present

Catherine Jauniaux is a Belgian avant-garde singer. She has been described as a "one-woman-orchestra", a "human sampler", and "one of the best kept secrets in the world of improvised music". Her solo album, Fluvial (1983) is regarded as one of her most accomplished works. She was married to the late American experimental cellist and composer Tom Cora.

== Biography ==
Catherine Jauniaux began her career as an actress in Belgium at the age of 15. During the late 1970s and early 1980s, she sang with several experimental rock groups, including Aksak Maboul and The Work. In 1983 she teamed up with The Work's Tim Hodgkinson (ex-Henry Cow) in London to record her first solo album, Fluvial. Jauniaux and Hodgkinson wrote most of the tracks for the album, which are "imagined folk songs" that include elements of "contemporary art song, African singing, Native American legends, and alien nursery rhymes". The album centres on Jauniaux's voice with additional instrumentation by Hodgkinson, Bill Gilonis (The Work), Lindsay Cooper (ex-Henry Cow) and Georgie Born (ex-Henry Cow). AllMusic rated the album as "highly recommended, especially to fans of unusual female vocal art."

In the early 1990s, Jauniaux moved to New York City, where she became part of the Downtown music scene, performing with a number of musicians, including Fred Frith, Tom Cora, Marc Ribot, Zeena Parkins, Butch Morris and Ikue Mori. Jauniaux founded the duo Vibraslaps with Ikue Mori and later married Tom Cora. In 1995 Jauniaux and Cora moved to Southern France where she continued performing with various European musicians, including Louis Sclavis, Heiner Goebbels, Otomo Yoshihide and Christian Marclay. Cora died in 1998.

Jauniaux works regularly with artists in the field of dance and film, and sang in Heiner Goebbels's opera, Roemische Hunde in Frankfurt in 1991. She is inspired by traditional music, both real and imagined, and her performances mix seriousness and humour. She explores sound, emotion, melody and abstraction, and her vocal improvisations range from "traditional French chansons to breathy folk to Dadaistic glossolalia".

== Discography ==
=== Bands and projects ===
Aksak Maboul

- Onze Danses Pour Combattre la Migraine (1977, LP, Kamikaze Records, 1980 Crammed Discs)
- Un Peu de l'Âme des Bandits (1980, LP, Crammed Discs)

Des Airs

- Lunga Notte (1982, LP, Crammed Discs)

The Work

- Slow Crimes (1982, LP, Woof Records, UK)
- The Worst of Everywhere (1983, CT, Woof Records, UK)

The Hat Shoes

- Differently Desperate (1991, CD, RecRec Music)
- Home (2002, CD, RecRec Music)

Vibraslaps (duo with Ikue Mori)

- Vibraslaps (1992, CD, RecRec Music)

Andy Bole

- Ramshackle Pier (2004, CD, Ad Hoc Records 05)

The Lowest Note

- WOOF 7 Inches (2004, CD, Ad Hoc Records 04)

Catherine Jauniaux / eRikm

- Mal Des Ardents / Pantoneon (2013, CD, Mikroton Recordings)

=== Solo ===
- Fluvial (1983, LP, Woof Records)
