= Stockholm & Göteborg =

Live album by Henry Cow
- Released: September 2008
- Recorded: March 1976, Hamburg (Note: This is a correction of what appeared in the original CD liner notes. See Errors in CD liner notes.); May 1976, Gothenburg; May 1977, Stockholm
- Genre: Avant-rock; free improvisation
- Length: 63:23
- Label: Recommended (UK)
- Producer: Henry Cow

Henry Cow chronology
Henry Cow Box (2006)	Stockholm & Göteborg (2008)	The 40th Anniversary Henry Cow Box Set (2009)

Volume 6: Stockholm & Göteborg is a live album by English avant-rock group Henry Cow, and is disc 6 of the 10-disc 40th Anniversary Henry Cow Box Set. It was released in September 2008 by RēR Megacorp as a free-standing album in advance of the box set release in January 2009.

Stockholm & Göteborg consists of previously unreleased recordings made by Sveriges Radio (Swedish Radio) of concerts performed by the group in May 1976 in Gothenburg and May 1977 in Stockholm. The concerts were later broadcast by Sveriges Radio in July 1976 and June 1977 respectively. Also included on the CD is a song from a concert in Hamburg in March 1976. The original 8 track and stereo 2 track master tapes were used and non-invasively remixed and remastered for this album by Bob Drake.

This was Henry Cow's first new release in 30 years and the first to include Georgie Born, the band's bassist and celloist from 1976 to 1978. It was also the first official release of the band performing "Erk Gah".

In September 2023 RēR Megacorp reissued Stockholm & Göteborg on a double-LP.

== Content ==
The album consists of three improvised pieces, "Stockholm 1", "Stockholm 2" and "Göteborg 1", and five composed pieces.

Featured on the album is "Erk Gah", a never before released Tim Hodgkinson composition that was performed live regularly by the band between 1976 and 1978, but never recorded in the studio. (Hodgkinson later recorded it in 1993 as "Hold to the Zero Burn, Imagine" on his 1994 solo album, Each in Our Own Thoughts with some of the former Henry Cow members and others.) Also featured for the first time is a never before released Fred Frith composition, "March" which the band used to end many of their concerts, and a cover of Phil Ochs's "No More Songs", arranged by Frith and the band's requiem to Ochs who had committed suicide in 1976. "Ottawa Song" is from an earlier concert in Hamburg with Dagmar Krause and John Greaves sharing the vocals, and was included on this CD by accident after having gotten mixed up with the Stockholm and Göteborg tapes. It is the same performance of "Ottawa Song" that appears on Volume 3: Hamburg, except for the introductory bassoon solo, which has been stripped off here.

Henry Cow performed the Gothenburg concert as the same quartet of Lindsay Cooper, Chris Cutler, Frith and Hodgkinson that had played at Trondheim two days previously (featured on Volume 4–5 of the 40th Anniversary Box Set). Greaves had left the group two months previously, Georgie Born had not yet joined, and Krause had withdrawn from the tour due to ill health. Without a dedicated bass guitarist and vocalist, the group improvised the set in the dark, as they had done at Trondheim, and used the same tapes they had prepared beforehand.

== Reception ==
Professional ratings
Review scores
Source	Rating
Clouds and Clocks	Mixed

In a review of Stockholm & Göteborg in Clouds and Clocks, Beppe Colli wrote that he was impressed by Cutler's drumming and Cooper's piano on "Stockholm 1", and called "Stockholm 2" a "good improvisation". He described "Goteborg 1" as "[s]trangely modal-sounding", with some of "the most interesting and beautiful moments on the album". Colli noted that the melody in Frith's "March" shows that his "affinity for certain climates pre-dated Gravity."

Colli was a little more critical of "No More Songs", opining that when Henry Cow played rock music, they tended to be too "rigid and stiff, absolutely out of their depth, like classical musicians doing their best." He also complained that Hodgkinson's "Erk Gah" sounds a little too similar to his "Living in the Heart of the Beast", and found Krause's singing "quite heavy" and "bordering on kitsch in its emphasis". But Colli liked the instrumental section in "Erk Gah"'s last movement, which he described as "very beautiful", and said the mixing "has worked wonders in presenting at their best all the compositional elements according to their role in the whole."

== Track listing ==
=== Original CD release ===
Note: track numbers as per the CD liner notes.

No.	Title	Writer(s)	Length
1.	"Stockholm 1"	Georgina Born, Lindsay Cooper, Chris Cutler, Fred Frith, Tim Hodgkinson	6:38
2.	"Erk Gah": 2. "Part 1"; 3. "Part 2"; 4. "Part 3"; 5. "Part 4"; 6. "Part 5"	Hodgkinson	17:06 3:28 2:55 2:27 6:17 1:59
7.	"A Bridge to Ruins"	Hodgkinson	5:08
8.	"Ottawa Song"	Cutler, Frith	3:27
9.	"Göteborg 1": 9. "Part 1"; 10. "Part 2"; 11. "Part 3"	Cooper, Cutler, Frith, John Greaves, Hodgkinson	16:53 6:06 8:20 2:27
12.	"No More Songs"	Phil Ochs arr. Frith	3:35
13.	"Stockholm 2"	Born, Cooper, Cutler, Frith, Hodgkinson, Dagmar Krause	6:13
14.	"March"	Frith	4:15

=== 2023 Double-LP release ===
Note: track numbers as per the LP liner notes.

Side one
No.	Title	Writer(s)	Length
1.	"Stockholm 1"	Georgina Born, Lindsay Cooper, Chris Cutler, Fred Frith, Tim Hodgkinson	6:38
2.	"Erk Gah"	Hodgkinson	17:06

Side two
No.	Title	Writer(s)	Length
1.	"Göteborg"	Cooper, Cutler, Frith, John Greaves, Hodgkinson	16:53

Side three
No.	Title	Writer(s)	Length
1.	"A Bridge to Ruins"	Hodgkinson	5:08
2.	"Ottawa Song"	Cutler, Frith	3:27
3.	"No More Songs"	Phil Ochs arr. Frith	3:35

Side four
No.	Title	Writer(s)	Length
1.	"Stockholm 2"	Born, Cooper, Cutler, Frith, Hodgkinson, Dagmar Krause	6:13
2.	"March"	Frith	4:15

=== Recording and broadcast dates ===
Note: track numbers refer to the CD release.

- Tracks 1–7 and 12–14 were recorded for Tonkraft by Sveriges Radio at a concert in Stockholm on 9 May 1977 and broadcast on 8 June and 11 June 1977; the programme producer was S. Vermalin.
- Track 8 was recorded for the NDR Jazz Workshop in Hamburg on 26 March 1976.
- Tracks 9-11 were recorded for Tonkraft by Sveriges Radio at a concert in Gothenburg on 28 May 1976 and broadcast on 14 July and 17 July 1976; the programme producer was Christer Eklund.

== Personnel ==
Note: track numbers refer to the CD release.

- Georgie Born – bass guitar, cello (tracks 1–7, 12–14)
- Lindsay Cooper – bassoon, flute, recorder, piano (tracks 1–2), tapes (tracks 9–11)
- Chris Cutler – drums, electrification, piano (track 10)
- Fred Frith – guitar, xylophone, piano (tracks 13–14), tapes (tracks 9–11)
- Tim Hodgkinson – organ, alto saxophone, clarinet, voice (tracks 9–11), tapes (tracks 9–11)
- Dagmar Krause – singing (tracks 1–7, 12–14)
- John Greaves – bass guitar (track 8), voice (track 8)

=== Production ===
- All recordings were edited by Chris Cutler.
- Tracks 1, 2, 5, 7 and 12–14 were remixed from the original 8-track recording.
- Tracks 3, 4 and 8–11 were remastered from the original stereo radio tape.
- All remixing and remastering was done by Bob Drake at Studio Midi-Pyrenees, 2007/2008.

== Errors in CD liner notes ==
After the release of this CD, errors in the liner notes surfaced.

- "Ottawa Song" was incorrectly listed as being part of the Gothenburg concert. It was from a concert in Hamburg on 26 March 1976 and included John Greaves on bass guitar and singing.
- The Gothenburg concert was incorrectly dated as May 1975 with John Greaves credited as having participated. The concert took place in May 1976, after Greaves had left the band (in March 1976) and before Georgie Born had joined (in June 1976). "Göteborg 1" was performed without a dedicated bass guitarist.
- Lindsay Cooper, Fred Frith and Tim Hodgkinson were incorrectly credited with using tapes on "Stockholm 2". Tapes were not used on "Stockholm 2", they were used on "Göteborg 1".

A new CD inlay with revised and corrected liner notes was supplied with The 40th Anniversary Henry Cow Box Set that was released in January 2009. However the new liner notes still incorrectly credited John Greaves as co-composer on "Göteborg 1".

== See also ==
- The 40th Anniversary Henry Cow Box Set (2009)

== Works cited ==
- Cutler, Chris, ed. (2009a). "The Road: Volumes 1–5". The 40th Anniversary Henry Cow Box Set (box set booklet). Henry Cow. London: Recommended Records.
- Cutler, Chris, ed. (2009b). "The Road: Volumes 6–10". The 40th Anniversary Henry Cow Box Set (box set booklet). Henry Cow. London: Recommended Records.
