= Tim Hodgkinson =

English experimental musician (born 1949)

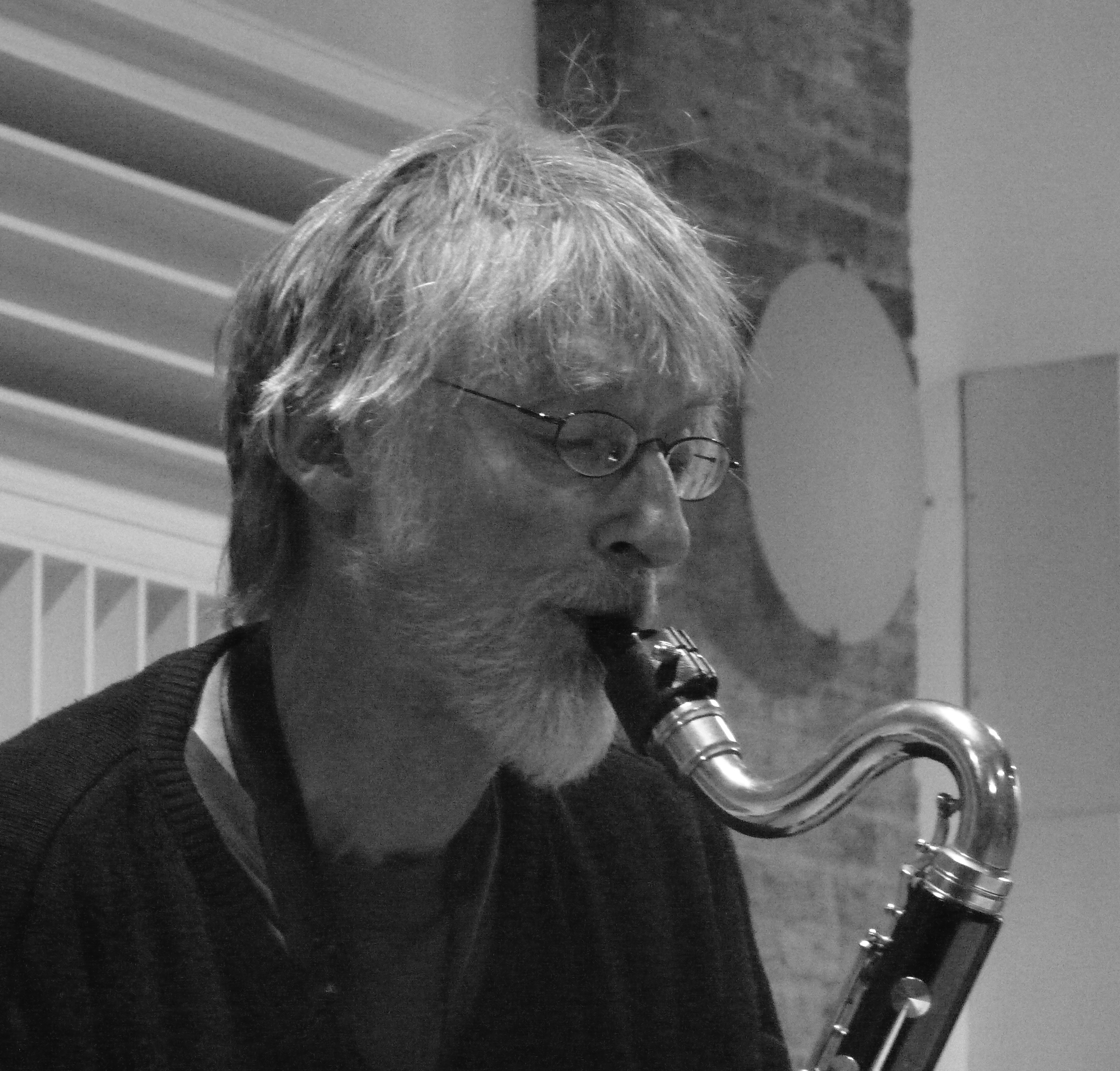
- Tim Hodgkinson playing a bass clarinet, October 2009

Background information
- Born: Timothy George Hodgkinson; 1 May 1949 (age 76); Salisbury, Wiltshire, England
- Genres: Avant-rock, post-punk, experimental, free improvisation, electronic, industrial, contemporary classical
- Occupations: Musician, composer
- Instruments: Saxophone, clarinet, keyboards, lap steel guitar, MIDI
- Years active: 1968–present
- Labels: Recommended, Woof, Mode, Setola di Maiale
- Website: www.timhodgkinson.co.uk

Timothy George Hodgkinson (born 1 May 1949) is an English experimental music composer and performer, principally on reeds, lap steel guitar, and keyboards. He first became known as one of the core members of the British avant-rock group Henry Cow, which he formed with Fred Frith in 1968. After the demise of Henry Cow, he participated in numerous bands and projects, eventually concentrating on composing contemporary music and performing as an improviser.

== Biography ==
Hodgkinson was born in Salisbury, Wiltshire in England on 1 May 1949, and was educated at Winchester College and Trinity College, Cambridge. He graduated in social anthropology from Cambridge in 1971, but chose to pursue a musical career instead. His interest in anthropology, however, remained and he drew on it later during a series of study trips to Siberia.

=== Henry Cow ===
While still at university, Hodgkinson and fellow student Fred Frith formed the seminal avant-rock group Henry Cow in 1968. Hodgkinson remained with Henry Cow as one of the band's core members until their demise in 1978 and composed a number of their musical pieces, most notably, "Living in the Heart of the Beast" (recorded on their 1975 album, In Praise of Learning), and "Erk Gah" (never formally recorded, but live versions appearing in The 40th Anniversary Henry Cow Box Set). Henry Cow was the foundation of Hodgkinson's musical education, and it was an opportunity for him to work closely with other instrumentalists and develop new musical landscapes. After Henry Cow split, Hodgkinson and fellow band member Chris Cutler compiled The Henry Cow Book, a collection of documents and information about the band, published in 1981.

In November 1973, Hodgkinson (and other members of Henry Cow) participated in a live-in-the-studio performance of Mike Oldfield's Tubular Bells for the BBC. It is available on Oldfield's Elements DVD.

=== Other projects ===
In 1980 Hodgkinson formed The Work, a post-punk band with guitarist-composer Bill Gilonis, bassist Mick Hobbs and drummer Rick Wilson. At the same time Hodgkinson and Gilonis formed the independent record label, Woof Records. Over the next few years, The Work toured Europe. After performing at a Rock in Opposition festival in Bonn with vocalist Catherine Jauniaux in 1982, the band and Jauniaux recorded Slow Crimes (1982) for the Woof label. Later that year, with a slightly altered line-up of Hodgkinson, Gilonis, Amos and Chris Cutler, they performed in Japan. A concert in Osaka in June 1982 was recorded with a cassette recorder halfway down the hall and was later cleaned up and released on an LP Live in Japan (1982). After the Japanese tour, The Work disbanded but reformed again in 1989 with the original line-up to record two industrial/noise albums, Rubber Cage (1989) and See (1992). In February 1987 Hodgkinson toured with South African band Kalahari Surfers, playing at the "Rote Lieder DDR" Festival of Political Songs.

In 1990 Hodgkinson and Ken Hyder, a Scottish percussionist and improviser, who had been performing together since 1978 (and used to be called Shams), toured Siberia, Soviet Far East and the heart of USSR (Moscow, Leningrad) as a duo under the banner "Friendly British Invasion™: In Search for the Soviet Sham(an)s" – probably the longest tour produced at the time independently from major Soviet concert officials (by distant Far-Eastern member of the Soviet Jazz Federation and due to the latter's assistance).

Later on, they made many other trips to Russia and study trips to Siberia particularly to make contact with local musicians and ritual specialists. It was during these times that they met shamanic musician Gendos Chamzyryn from Tuva and as a trio, they toured Altay villages in the summer of 1998. Chamzyryn played a variety of traditional Tuvan instruments and used the deep-vocal Kargiraa style of overtone-singing.

The success of this "shaman" project resulted in the formation of K-Space, a band comprising Hodgkinson, Hyder and Chamzyryn. K-Space's name came from Kozyrev-Space, a space/time warp named after Russian astrophysicist Nicolai Kozyrev using a device called Kozyrev's Mirrors. Their music was "sham beat", which incorporated elements of shamanic culture and jazz. From 1999 they began touring Asia and Europe and have released four CDs since 2002.

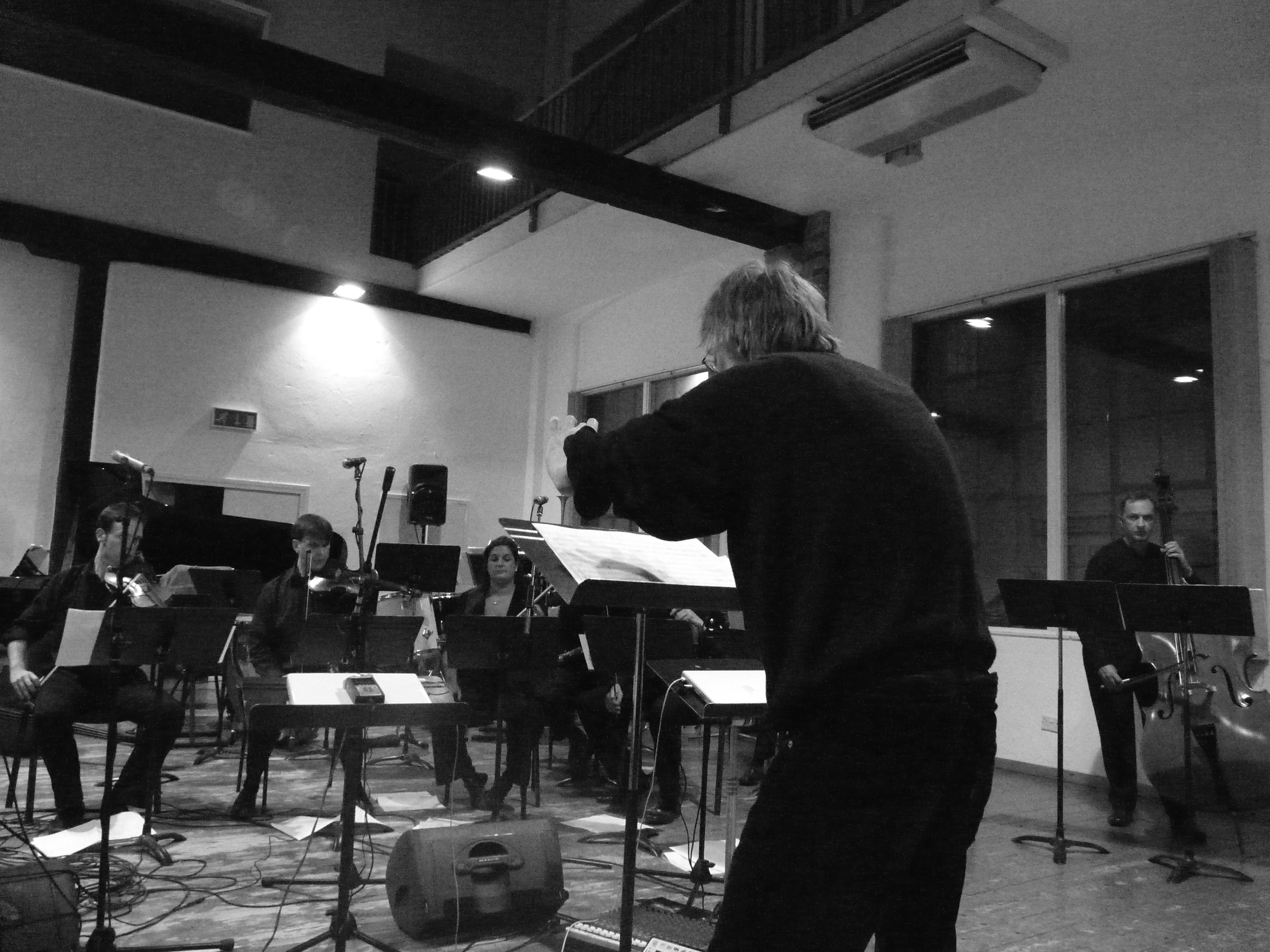
Hodgkinson conducting the Talea Ensemble in 2009

A free improvisation band Hodgkinson is deeply involved with is Konk Pack. Formed at the Szuenetjel Festival in Budapest in 1997 with Thomas Lehn from Cologne on synthesizer, Roger Turner from London on percussion and Hodgkinson on reeds and prepared guitar, the trio performs a blend of psychedelia, free jazz and electroacoustic improvisation. In 1999 they released a CD of live recordings The Big Deep and made further CDs in 2001, 2005, 2010 and 2013. In 2005 Konk Pack toured the United Kingdom with Lol Coxhill replacing Thomas Lehn. In 2007 they toured The Netherlands, Belgium and Germany with the original line-up.

As an improviser, Hodgkinson performed with many musicians over the years, including Lol Coxhill, Fred Frith, Chris Cutler, Tom Cora, Lindsay Cooper, John Zorn, Evan Parker, Catherine Jauniaux and Charles Hayward. In December 2006, Cutler, Frith and Hodgkinson performed together at The Stone in New York City, their first concert performance since Henry Cow's demise in 1978.

From 1983 to 1985 Hodgkinson managed the Cold Storage Recording Studios in Brixton, London, producing records for Fred Frith's Skeleton Crew, Peter Blegvad and others. He has written a book on the anthropology of music and contributed to periodicals such as Contemporary Music Review, Musicworks, Musica/Realta, and Resonance on music and technology, ethnomusicology, improvisation and other topics. In 2016 his book Music and the Myth of Wholeness – Toward a New Aesthetic Paradigm was published by MIT Press.

Hodgkinson appeared in Nicolas Humbert and Werner Penzel's 1990 documentary film on Fred Frith, Step Across the Border, rehearsing with Frith at Hodgkinson's home in Brixton, London in December 1988.

Hodgkinson's first solo album was Splutter in 1986, consisting of improvisations on alto and baritone saxophones and clarinet, sometimes accompanied by electronics, sometimes multi-tracked. He followed it up with KLARNT in 2008, an album of eleven solo clarinet improvisations.

=== Composition ===
Beginning in the early 1990s Hodgkinson again applied himself to composition, initially returning to the approach developed in his Henry Cow period.

In 1994 he released Each in Our Own Thoughts, a collection of pieces including his first string quartet, and a piece written for Henry Cow in 1976 ("Hold to the Zero Burn, Imagine"), which was performed at the time (as "Erk Gah") but never recorded in the studio. When finally recorded in 1993 he brought in three other members of the original band: Chris Cutler, Lindsay Cooper and Dagmar Krause. A further piece "Numinous Pools For Mental Orchestra" was realised entirely with MIDI-instruments.

However his work as an improviser by now made him far more aware of the limitations of his current way of writing. An encounter with Iancu Dumitrescu and the Romanian Spectralist school provided a turning point, after which he began to find new ways of developing musical structures out of the behaviours of sounds and unstable acoustic systems. This became evident with the release of the CD Pragma in 1998, on which the pieces are realised on a computer using a mix of live instruments and samples.

In 2000 Hodgkinson made Sang, a collection of new compositions. The first and third pieces were performed by Hodgkinson alone, playing viola, piano, alto saxophone, percussion and MIDI instruments; the second piece GUSHe, which he has often performed live, is for clarinet with electronic accompaniment, while the last, MÀ was performed by Federica Santoro (singing) with a montage made from recordings of other pieces of Hodgkinson's (a rehearsal with Banda Municipal de Barcelona and fragments of his second String Quartet).

Hodgkinson then released Sketch of Now on the Mode label in 2006. It comprises three compositions for the Romanian Hyperion Ensemble, of which Hodgkinson conducted two and played on one (conducted by Iancu Dumitrescu); two compositions performed by Hodgkinson: one for bass clarinet and tape, one for computer-modified cello and electric guitar; one piece for two clarinets, one doubling on bass, and piano, performed by Isabelle Duthoit, Jacques Di Donato and Pascale Berthelot. The track, "Fragor" appears in the 2010 film Shutter Island, but was not featured on the soundtrack CD.

This was followed up in 2014 with Onsets, a second CD for the Mode label. Five of the six pieces are performed by the Hyperion Ensemble, and one piece by the New York based ensemble Ne(x)tworks. Hodgkinson conducts all the pieces and also plays bass clarinet on “Ulaaraar.”

In 2015, he released CUTS on the Freeform Association label, which groups together three compositions having a mathematical approach in their structure. “Hard without I” is performed by the composer on solo bass clarinet. “On Earth” is Hodgkinson's second piece to be performed by Ne(x)tworks, this time with Joan La Barbara. “Ananké” is performed by the Hyperion Ensemble. The latter two pieces are conducted by the composer.

== Music ==
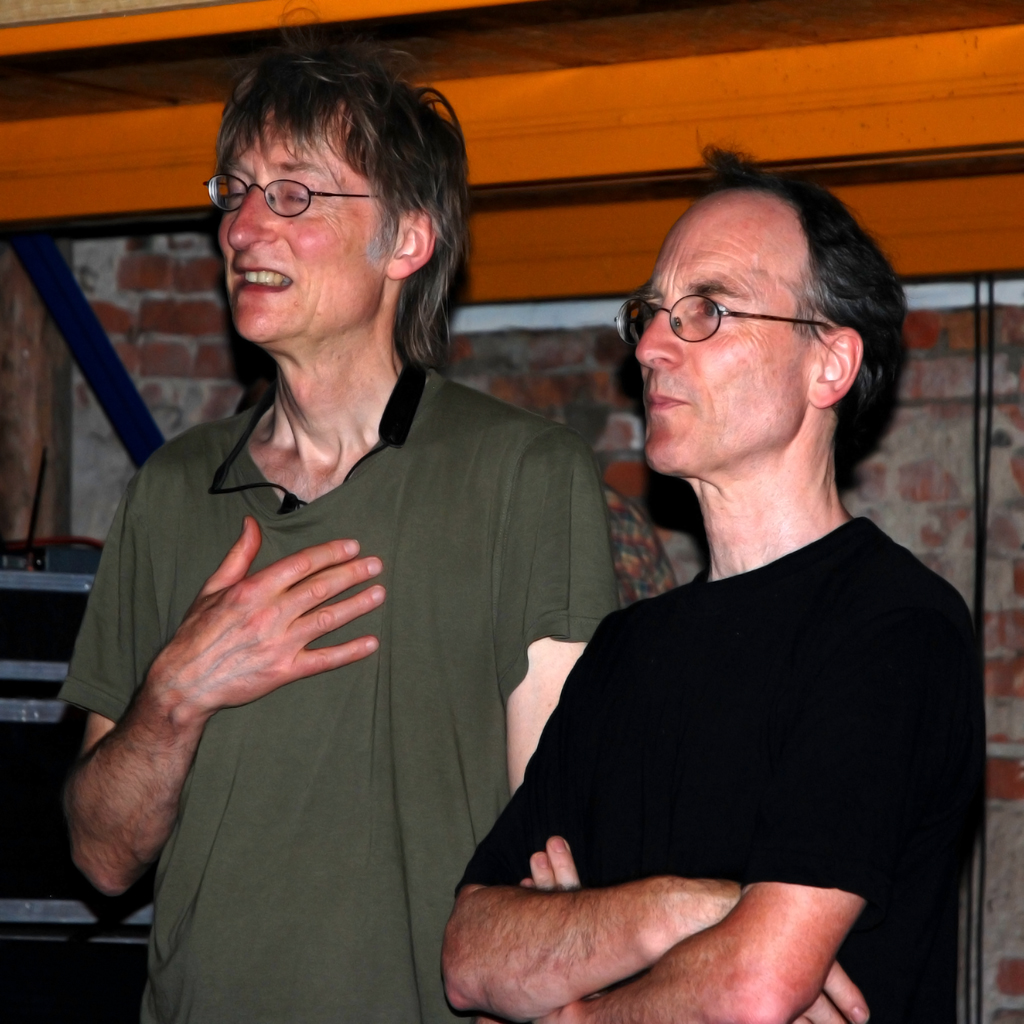
Hodgkinson (left) and Chris Cutler in Schiphorst, Germany, 6 July 2008.

Hodgkinson's music displays many personalities: from the serious and complex musical structures of Henry Cow to the angry post-punk crash of guitars in The Work; from free-wheeling improvisations with Konk Pack to the contemporary classical music of his recordings for the Mode label.

The instruments he plays are principally reeds (clarinet, bass clarinet, and alto saxophone), but with Henry Cow he mostly played keyboards, and with The Work, K-Space and Konk Pack he played and plays lap steel guitar. He also sang in The Work. For his solo recordings he added viola, percussion, sampling, sequencing and MIDI.

Hodgkinson is a self-taught musician. He started formal piano and clarinet lessons as a child, but quickly abandoned them. He then began writing down music, initially using a keyboard but soon switched to writing the sounds in his head directly onto paper. To assist with this process, he studied sight-singing with Andras Ranki at Morley College, London in 1983.

== Works ==
- Repulsion (1997) – for clarinet, electric guitar, trombone, percussion. c 10'
- SHHH (1996–97) – for taped voices. c 7'
- For Looking Inside (1997) – for 3 prepared violas. c 10'30"
- Interferogram (1997) – for large ensemble. c 10'
- Mala; Elated (1997) – for clarinet, harpsichord, organ, metal plates, cymbals. c 8'
- Black Death and Errors in Construction (1998) – for bass clarinet, prepared piano, electric guitar, 2 cellos, 2 violas, percussion, tape. c 12'
- The Road to Erzin (1999) – for viola, piano, alto saxophone, percussion (2 players) & live electronic sound-processing. c 15'
- Crackle of Forests (1999) – for many instruments. c 23'
- Gushe (1999) – solo clarinet and tape. c 13'
- Ma (1999) – montage. c 20'
- Apophasis (2001) – concrète sound-art piece with David Connearn. c 22'
- Fighting/Breathing (2001) – for bass clarinet and taped percussion. c 7'40"
- String Quartet 3 (2000–1)
- Vers Kongsu (2002) – for clarinet and percussion. c 15'
- Fragor (2003) – computer-assisted music for arco electric guitar and cello. c 7'
- Vers Kongsu II (2003) – revised version of Vers Kongsu for clarinet and ensemble.
- De Yoknapatawpha (2003–04) – 2 clarinets (one doubling bass) + piano. c 12'
- Watching into a Hard Stone (2004) – tape music using sounds of clarinet, ringmodulator, prepared piano, pitch shifter. c 9'
- Aici Schiteaza Pe Acumul (2004) – for tape and instrumental ensemble (3 vln/vla, 2 celli, 2 cb, oboe, 2 flt, clar, bass-clar, bassoon, sax, trom, 2 percuss, piano). c 9'
- Further into Hard Stone (2004) – arranged for flute (+ pic), oboe, 2 clars, bassoon, fr horn, saxes, strings, piano, percussion. c 9'
- Piece for Harp and Cello (2004–05) – c 9'
- Nameless Tower (2005) – for Vln, 2 alto, cello, flute, clar, bass clar, trombone, piano, 2 percussion.
- Thrown (2005) – for bass clarinet doubling clarinet, harp, piano, double bass, percussion and live sound treatment and projection. c 9'
- Ulaaraar (2005) – for bass clarinet, string ensemble (min 2 altos, 2 cellos) and small gong. c 10'
- Untitled for solo Bb clarinet (2005–06)
- Carillon for Amplified Harpsichord and four pre-recorded Electric Guitars (2006) – for harpsichord and tape. c 4'45"
- Hearken (2006) – for bass clarinet and tape. c 12'
- Against Time (2006) – for 14 woodwind & brass instruments, percussion, keyboard. c 19'45"
- Amhas / Niritti (2006) – for tape and ensemble. c 14'
- Nomos-Yozu (2007) – for ensemble. c 13' Huddersfield Contemporary Music Festival Commission.
- the hum of destruction whirrs through the national cackle of love and produce (2007) – for (bass) flute, acoustic guitar, electronics. c 17'
- Tmesis (2007) – for tape, solo cello, 2 clarinets, 2 percussion, horn, trombone. c 10'30"
- Chasma (2008) – for Ensemble: flute, oboe, clarinet, trumpet, horn, trombone doubling cb. trom, piano, harp, 2 vlns, 2 vlas, 2 cellos, 2 basses. c23'
- ZUD (2008) – graphic score for elec guitar, piano, cello, bass, percussion. c 9'20"
- Ich Horig (2008) – graphic score for tape, clarinet, piano, cello, bass, percussion. c 7'
- Ici-bas (2009) – for flute, 2 clarinets, bassoon, 2 trombones, piano, 3 violins, 3 altos, 2 cellos, 2 basses. For Spectrum XXI 2009. c 14"
- Attaot (2009) – for flute, clarinet, bassoon, 2 trombones, 2 percussion, violin, alto, cello, 2 basses & tape. For Spectrum XXI 2009. 8'30"
- Jo-Ha-Qui (2010) – for string quartet, harp, trombone, synthesiser and bowed glass. c 16"
- The Glow and Zigzag (2011) – for French horn solo. London Sinfonietta commission. c 6"
- Tree Leaf Talk (2011) – for voice, violin, cello, trombone, harp, piano, live and pre-recorded electronic sound. Commissioned by Ne(X)tworks Ensemble, NYC. c 35"
- Hail and Flummox (2011) – flute, clarinet, horn, violin, cello. London Sinfonietta commission. 7"
- Ananké (2011) – flute, clarinet, violin, 2 cellos, double bass, piano, percussion, electric guitar, no-input mixer, and pre-recorded computer-modulated sound. For Spectrum XXI 2011. c 16"
- Landscape Theory of Mind (2012) – violin solo. Commissioned by Cornelius Dufallo.c 7"
- Ricochet (2013) – for strings, piano, electric guitar & tape. For Spectrum XXI 2013.

== Discography ==
=== Bands and projects ===
With Henry Cow

- Legend (1973, LP, Virgin Records, UK)
- Unrest (1974, LP, Virgin, UK)
- Concerts (1976, 2xLP, Caroline Records, UK)
- Western Culture (1979, LP, Broadcast, UK)
- The Virgin Years – Souvenir Box (1991, 3xCD, East Side Digital Records, US)
- Henry Cow Box (2006, 7xCD, Recommended Records, UK)
- Stockholm & Göteborg (2008, CD, Recommended Records, UK)
- The 40th Anniversary Henry Cow Box Set (2009, 9xCD+DVD, Recommended Records, UK)
- The Henry Cow Box Redux: The Complete Henry Cow (2019, 17xCD+DVD, Recommended, UK)

With Henry Cow/Slapp Happy

- Desperate Straights (1975, LP, Virgin Records, UK)
- In Praise of Learning (1975, LP, Virgin Records, UK)

With Art Bears

- Hopes and Fears (1978, LP, Recommended Records, UK)

With The Work

- Slow Crimes (1982, LP, Woof Records, UK)
- Live in Japan (1982, LP, Recommended Records, Japan)
- The Worst of Everywhere (1983, cassette, Woof Records, UK)
- Rubber Cage (1989, LP, Woof Records, UK)
- See (1992, CD, Woof Records, UK)
- The 4th World (2010, CD, Ad Hoc Records, US)

With Catherine Jauniaux

- Fluvial (1983, LP, Woof Records, UK)

With Lindsay Cooper, Chris Cutler, Bill Gilonis and Robert Wyatt

- The Last Nightingale (1984, LP, Recommended Records, UK)

With The Momes

- Spiralling (1989, Woof Records)

With God

- Loco (1991, CD, Pathological Records, UK)
- Possession (1992, CD, Caroline Records, UK)
- Consumed (1993, CD, Sentrax Records, UK)
- The Anatomy of Addiction (1994, CD, Big Cat, UK)

With Fred Frith

- Live Improvisations (1992, CD, Woof Records, UK)

With Valentina Ponomareva & Ken Hyder

- The Goose (1992, CD, Megaphone Records US, Woof Records UK)

With Konk Pack

- Big Deep (1999, CD, Grob, Germany)
- Warp Out (2001, CD, Grob, Germany)
- Off Leash (2005, CD, Grob, Germany)
- The Black Hills (2010, CD, Grob, Germany)
- Doing the Splash (2013, CD, Megaphone, US)

With Black Paintings (Nikolai Galen / Hodgkinson / Ken Hyder)

- Screams and Silence (2008, CD, Voice of Shade, Turkey)

With K-Space

- Bear Bones (2002, CD, Slam Records, UK)
- Going Up (2004, CD, Ad Hoc, US)
- Infinity (2008, CD-ROM, Ad Hoc, US)
- Black Sky (2013, CD, Setola di Maiale Records, Italy)

With The Orckestra

- "Unreleased Orckestra Extract" (3" CD single, 2006, Recommended, UK)

With RAZ3 (Lu Edmonds / Ken Hyder / Hodgkinson)

- RAZ3 (2008, CD, ??, UK)

With Yumi Hara

- Groove Study (2023, CD, UK)

=== Solo ===
- Splutter (1985, LP, Woof Records, UK)
- Each in Our Own Thoughts (1994, CD, Woof Records, UK)
- Pragma (1998, CD, Recommended Records, UK)
- Sang (2000, CD, Recommended Records, UK)
- Sketch of Now (2006, CD, Mode, US)
- Klarnt (2010, CD Recommended Records, UK)
- Onsets (2014, CD, Mode, US)
- Cuts (2015, CD, Freeform Association, Poland)
- Under the Void (2019, CD, Recommended Records, UK)

== Bibliography ==
- Cutler, Chris; Hodgkinson, Tim (1981). The Henry Cow Book. Third Step Printworks. ISBN 0-9508870-0-5.
- Hodgkinson, Tim (February 2016). Music and the Myth of Wholeness – Toward a New Aesthetic Paradigm. MIT Press. ISBN 9780262034067.
