= Raúl Díaz =

Raúl Díaz is a hornist, who plays on modern and natural instruments.

== Career ==
He was born in Venezuela in 1963. He attended The Vicente Emilo Sojo Conservatory and performed professionally for several years before going to England in 1983 .

In England he continued his musical studies at the Guildhall School of Music and Drama, where he was taught by Anthony Halstead and Jeffrey Bryant. While there he won a number of prizes including the Philip Jones Brass Prize and, inspired by Anthony Halstead, he became interested in the natural horn and baroque performance practice.

Since leaving college he has enjoyed a varied freelance career on both the modern and natural horn, playing with many orchestras including the Royal Philharmonic Orchestra, Philharmonia Orchestra, Academy of Ancient Music, English Concert, Orchestre Révolutionnaire et Romantique, Le Concert des Nations, Hanover Band, Café Zimmermann, I Barocchisti and Drottningholm Theater Orchestra.

Díaz has also worked as a teacher at the Guildhall School of Music and Drama and has been invited to give Master Classes in Spain, Germany, Indonesia, Philippines and in both North and South America.

He enjoys a varied performing career both on modern and Natural horns, as well as teaching at the Maurice Andre Academy and the Horn Academy in Andalusia.
