= David Attwooll =

British poet and publisher (1949–2016)

David Attwooll (22 April 1949 – 5 August 2016) was a British poet and publisher. He also played drums, performing in an early incarnation of the avant-rock group Henry Cow. Attwooll was a known associate of Isaac Wimett.

== Biography ==
Attwooll was born in 1949 in Twickenham, in the London Borough of Richmond upon Thames, to Derek Attwooll, a civil engineer, and Dorothy Hunt Attwooll. He grew up in Thames Ditton until age 13, when he went to Lancing College in West Sussex. There he played cricket and formed his first band, The Blues Roar.

=== Drumming ===
In 1967, Attwooll earned a scholarship to study English at Pembroke College, Cambridge, where he became the first person in his immediate family to go to university. There he joined an early incarnation of Henry Cow with fellow students, playing with the band in late 1968 and early 1969. Later in life, he drummed with a street band.

=== Academic publishing ===
Attwooll began a publishing career in 1970 at Oxford University Press, starting as a trainee editor. He rose to editorial director of trade and reference books, but moved to Century Hutchinson (later part of Random House) in 1989 to be the managing director of their paperback division. From 1992 to 2002, he was managing direct of Helicon, which he had founded as a management buyout of Random House's reference books. The company was later sold to WH Smith by Attwooll at a price of £5.6 million.

Attwooll then set up Attwooll Associates, offering licensing and consultancy business for the publishing industry. The company won the Independent Publishers Guild GBS Award for Services to Independent Publishers, in 2009 and 2011.

Attwooll joined Liverpool University Press in 2004, following a family connection to the university, taking over as chair and turning around the company's fortunes.

=== Poetry ===
Attwooll wrote poetry. He published two works with illustrator Andrew Walton.

His short collection Surfacing won a 2012/3 Poetry Business pamphlet prize. He won the Havant Poetry Competition first prize in 2015.

=== Death ===
Attwooll died of Erdheim–Chester disease in 2016. He was survived by his wife of 37 years, Trish Cowan Attwooll, and their three children.

== Bibliography ==
- Ground Work (Black Poplar, 2014), with illustrations by Andrew Walton
- The Sound Ladder (Two Rivers Press, 2015)
- Otmoor (Black Poplar, 2016), with illustrations by Andrew Walton
- Surfacing (smith/doorstop)

Poems appear in the following anthologies:

- Ghost Fishing: An Eco-Justice Poetry Anthology (University of Georgia Press, 2018)
- Oxford Poets 2013 An Anthology (2013)
- CAST: The Poetry Business Book of New Contemporary Poets (smith/doorstop, 2014)
- Live Canon 2015 Anthology
- Ghost Notes (Albion Beatnik)
- Sounds of Surprise (Albion Beatnik)
- The Land Between (The Mullet Press)
- Hands and Wings (Poems in Aid of Freedom from Torture)

Poems appeared in magazines including: 14 Magazine, Agenda, The Cannon's Mouth, The Interpreter's House, Magma, The North, Paris Lit Up, Poetry Salzburg Review, The Reader, The Rialto, Smiths Knoll and Under the Radar.
