= Ana-Maria Avram =

Romanian composer, pianist, conductor, and musicologist

Ana-Maria Avram (12 September 1961– 1 August 2017) was a Romanian composer, pianist, conductor and musicologist. Avram was the co-conductor of the Hyperion Ensemble and co-founder and artistic director of the Spectrum XXI festival, which was designed to showcase innovative Romanian music.

== Biography ==
Avram was born in 1961 in Bucharest, Romania. She attended the National University of Music Bucharest from 1980 to 1985, after which she studied aesthetics at Sorbonne, Paris. She was also the co-director of Hyperion Ensemble with her husband Iancu Dumitrescu, who founded the ensemble in 1976. The ensemble toured in Romania, France, and the UK. Avram also took on an administrative role by creating Spectrum XXI festival, which was designed to showcase innovative Romanian music. Avram was an early member of the Romanian community of electronic and computer music. Avram composed commissions for ensembles such as the Kronos Quartet, 20 Jahrhundert from Vienna, and orchestras including Bucharest Philharmonic Orchestra, the Romanian National Orchestra, the Romanian Radio Chamber Orchestra, and Radio-France.

Avram died suddenly on 1 August 2017 at the age of fifty-five. She continues to have performances of her works after her death, like Issue Projects Room's "Tombeau for Ana-Maria Avram" concert.

== Musical style ==
Avram's music synthesized contemporary classical, improvisation, electro-acoustic- and electronic music. Her music tended to move between improvisation and notation and often used electronics to augment her sonic palette. Avram was a proponent of spectral music, and argued that spectralism is "a specific attitude towards sound" which encompasses "many different viewpoints". She composed around 130 pieces, and released 25 collaborative albums with her husband.
