= Iancu Dumitrescu =

Romanian avant-garde composer

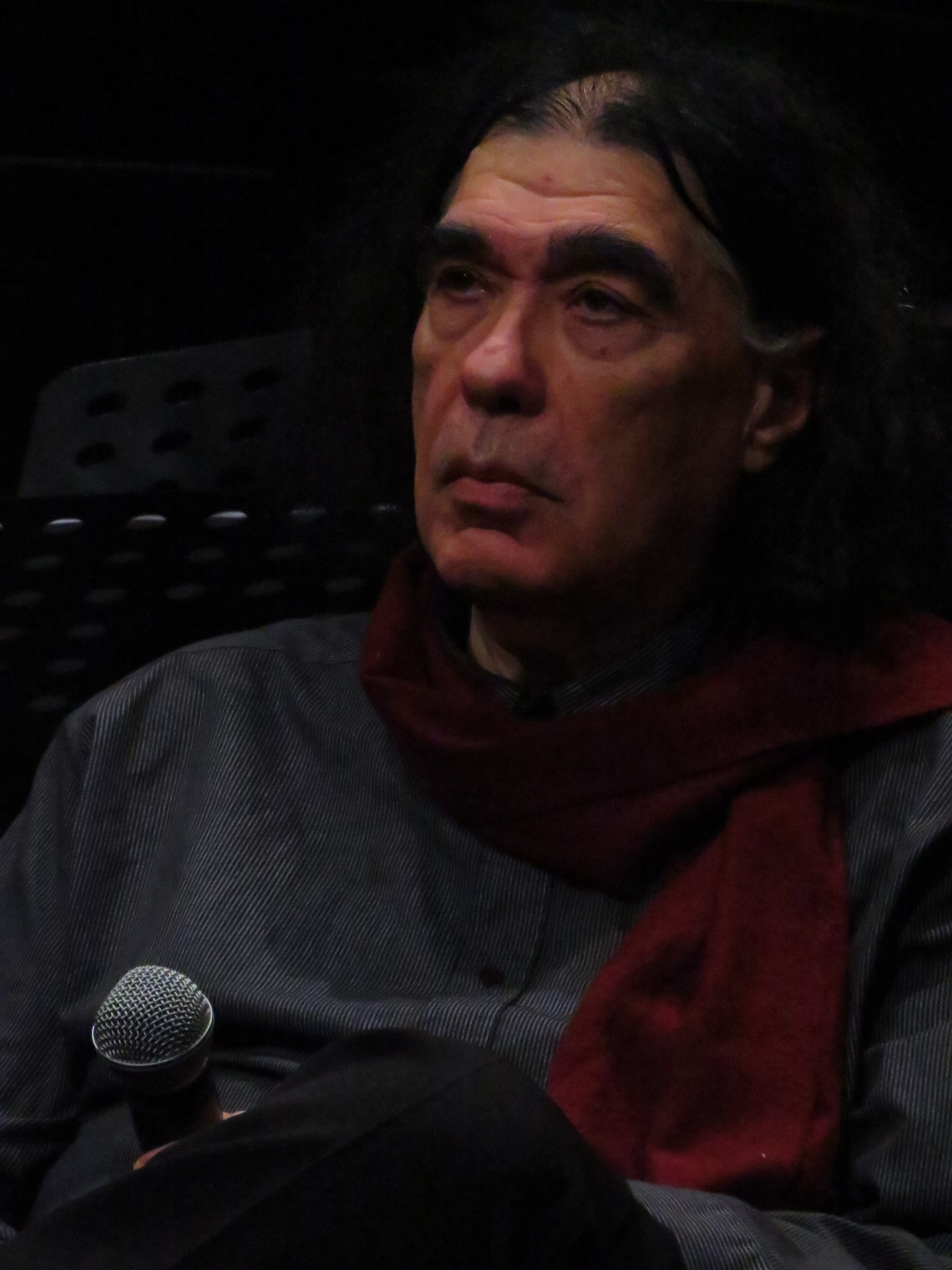
Iancu Dumitrescu

Iancu Dumitrescu (born 15 July 1944) is a Romanian avant-garde composer.

== Life and works ==
Dumitrescu was born in Sibiu, Romania. He received a master's degree in composition in Bucharest, where his teachers included Alfred Mendelsohn. Later, he studied conducting and philosophy with Sergiu Celibidache, who led Dumitrescu to engage with the philosophy of Edmund Husserl and apply the principles of phenomenology to music.

He began composing his mature works in the early 1970s. In 1976 he founded the Hyperion Ensemble, which he describes as "a multimedia group dedicated to experimental music". Several of Dumitrescu's early works for solo contrabass were recorded by the noted avant-garde bassist Fernando Grillo.

Dumitrescu has composed a large body of works for acoustic instruments and ensembles as well as works combining acoustic and electronic sounds and works composed entirely using tape or computer. In its emphasis on long tones that undergo transformations of timbre, Dumitrescu's music can be loosely grouped with that of Italian composer Giacinto Scelsi and with the spectral music of fellow Romanian Horațiu Rădulescu and the French composers of the spectral school.

Dumitrescu describes his music as "acousmatic" but disclaims a relationship with the acousmatic music of French musique concrète pioneer Pierre Schaeffer. He accepts the "spectralist" label, though he distinguishes his work from some others in the spectral school in that it is not serial. Dumitrescu has said that "I think of myself as a spectralist, but in completely different way from the French".

Dumitrescu was married to fellow composer Ana-Maria Avram (1961–2017); they have more than 20 joint CD releases on their Edition Modern label. Recordings of Dumitrescu's works have also been released by Edition RZ, ReR Megacorp, Generations Unlimited, and other record labels. He is represented by Editions Salabert.
