= The Work (band) =

English rock group

- From left to right: Tim Hodgkinson, Rick Wilson, Mick Hobbs, Bill Gilonis

Background information
- Origin: England
- Genres: Avant-rock, post-punk, industrial music
- Years active: 1980–1982, 1989–1994
- Label: Woof Records
- Past members: Tim Hodgkinson; Bill Gilonis; Mick Hobbs; Rick Wilson

The Work were an English post-punk group, founded in 1980 by multi-instrumentalist/composer Tim Hodgkinson and guitarist/composer Bill Gilonis, with bass guitarist Mick Hobbs and drummer Rick Wilson. The band toured Europe in 1981 and 1982, and recorded their first album, Slow Crimes in 1982. After a tour of Japan later that year and releasing Live in Japan, the band split up. In 1989, the Work reformed to record Rubber Cage and performed throughout Europe between 1989 and 1994, releasing another album, See in 1992. A live album, The 4th World, recorded in Germany in 1994, was released in 2010.

== History ==
Ex-Henry Cow co-founder Tim Hodgkinson began recording with Bill Gilonis in 1979. They experimented with tape collages which led to the creation of an independent record label, Woof Records and a band. Enlisting the services of Mick Hobbs and Rick Wilson they formed the Work, a post-punk rock group.

In 1981, the Work made their first recording, an EP "I Hate America", released on the Woof label. They then embarked on a tour of Europe, performing in the Netherlands, Belgium, Switzerland, Sweden, Finland, Norway, Germany, France, Italy and Yugoslavia. Extracts from these live performances were later released on a cassette tape album, The Worst of Everywhere (1983). In 1982, the band played at a Rock in Opposition Festival in Bonn with vocalist Catherine Jauniaux, after which they recorded their first album Slow Crimes on the Woof label with Jauniaux as guest musician. Slow Crimes took punk rock to new heights by introducing elements of avant-rock. Philip Clark wrote in The Wire in 2008 that the Work introduced "unheralded level[s] of rhythmic complexity to punk".

The band's next commitment was a tour of Japan in June 1982, but before the tour began, Wilson left to study chenda temple drumming in Kerala, South India, and Hobbs followed soon after over disagreements about the band's musical direction. Committed to the tour, Hodgkinson and Gilonis asked ex-Henry Cow drummer Chris Cutler and bassist Jim "Amos" Welton to join them in Japan. With this altered line-up, the group played three concerts in Tokyo and one in Osaka. The Osaka concert was recorded with a cassette recorder halfway down the hall, which was later cleaned up and released by Recommended Records Japan on an LP Live in Japan. At the end of the tour, the group split up.

In 1989, the Work reformed with its original members and recorded an industrial/noise album Rubber Cage, after which they returned to touring Europe, performing in France, Germany, Austria, Czechoslovakia, Switzerland and Italy over the next two years. In 1992, they made their last album, See, which they played live on their ongoing European tour. In 1993, the band played at the St. Petersburg Open Music Festival in Russia. The Work's last performances were in 1994 in Italy, Switzerland, Germany, Slovenia and the Czech Republic, where they had begun drawing on Hopi Indian mythology for their sets.

The 4th World, a live album recorded in Freiburg im Breisgau, Germany in 1994, was released by Ad Hoc Records in 2010. The original mono recordings were reprocessed into stereo by Udi Koomran.

Mick Hobbs died on 3 January 2025, at the age of 69.

== Personnel ==
- Tim Hodgkinson – saxophones, bass clarinet, keyboards, lap steel guitar, lead vocals
- Bill Gilonis – guitar, euphonium, sampling, vocals
- Mick Hobbs – guitar, bass guitar, drums, ukulele, recorder, midi-horn, vocals (died 2025)
- Rick Wilson – drums, bass guitar, vocals

== Discography ==
=== Albums ===
- Slow Crimes (1982, LP, Woof Records, UK)
- Live in Japan (1982, LP, Recommended Records, Japan)
- The Worst of Everywhere (1983, CT, Woof Records, UK)
- Rubber Cage (1989, LP, Woof Records, UK)
- See (1992, CD, Woof Records, UK)
- The 4th World (2010, CD, Ad Hoc Records, US)

=== Extended plays ===
- "I Hate America" / "Fingers & Toes" / "Duty" (1981, EP, Woof Records, UK)

=== Singles ===
- "I Hate America" (1982, 7", Eastern Works, UK)
- "Slowly Crimes" (1982, 7", Eastern Works, UK)

=== Compilations ===
- The Work (2018, LP, Jelodanti Records, France)

=== Other album appearances ===
- Various artists: Miniatures: A Sequence of Fifty-One Tiny Masterpieces (1980, LP, Pipe, UK) – includes one track, "With Wings Pressed Back" by the Work
- Various artists: Recommended Records Sampler (1982, 2xLP, Recommended Records, UK) – includes one track, "Houdini" by the Work
- Various artists: Masse Mensch (1982, LP, Selektion, Germany) – includes two tracks, "Anxious (About Meaning)" and "One Swallow" by the Work
- Various artists: Unsere Jungs (1980's, LP, D&S Recording, Germany) – includes one track, "Such A Little Rushness" by the Work
- Various artists: Hardis Bruts (Hommage À L'Art Brut) (1992, CD, In-Poly-Sons, France) – includes one track, "Screem Circle" by the Work
- The Lowest Note, The Work, Gilonis / Hodgkinson: WOOF 7 Inches (2004, CD, Ad Hoc Records, US) – includes six tracks by the Work
- Various artists: With Love, Jelodanti. (2020, 2xLP, Jelodanti Records, France) – includes one track, "Auspice / Live In Brussels, 10 May 1980" by the Work
