= Live Improvisations =

Live album by Fred Frith and Tim Hodgkinson
- Released: 1992 (Note: This album appears to have been released in 1992, even though the liner notes say "All music copyright Hodgkinson/Frith 1990", and several sources list the release date as 1990.)
- Recorded: May 1990
- Venues: London, Sheffield, Leeds Bridge End
- Genres: Experimental music, free improvisation
- Length: 52:48
- Labels: Woof (UK); Megaphone (US)
- Producers: Fred Frith and Tim Hodgkinson

Fred Frith chronology
Dropera (1991)	Live Improvisations (1992)	Helter Skelter (1992)

Live Improvisations is a 1992 collaborative live album of improvised music by English experimental musicians Fred Frith and Tim Hodgkinson. It was recorded in May 1990 in England and was released on Woof Records in the United Kingdom and Megaphone Records in the United States.

== Reception ==
Professional ratings
Review scores
Source	Rating
AllMusic	4.5/5 stars

Writing in a review at AllMusic, Rick Anderson described the improvisations of Frith and Hodgkinson on this album as "cacophonic", but added that "none of it is ugly; in fact, much of it is downright lovely". Anderson rated the album as "[h]ighly recommended".

== Track listing ==
All tracks are untitled, composed by Fred Frith and Tim Hodgkinson, and performed in England.

Track	Venue	Date	Length
1.	Club Integral, Conway Hall, London	12 May 1990	33:20
2.	Purcell Room, London	13 May 1990	2:08
3.	Purcell Room, London	13 May 1990	1:17
4.	Purcell Room, London	13 May 1990	3:13
5.	George IV, Infirmary Road, Sheffield	10 May 1990	8:23
6.	Termite Club, The Adelphi, Leeds Bridge End	11 May 1990	4:27

Source: Discogs, Fred Frith discography.

== Personnel ==
- Fred Frith – guitar, violin, vocals
- Tim Hodgkinson – keyboards, alto saxophone, clarinet

Source: Discogs, Fred Frith discography.

== Recording notes ==
All tracks recorded by Michael Gerzon.

- Track 1 recorded on a 4-track
- Tracks 2, 3 and 4 recorded on a DAT
- Tracks 5 and 6 recorded on a Sony Professional

Source: Discogs.
