= Hyperion Ensemble =

Hyperion Ensemble is a Romanian chamber music ensemble based in Bucharest. It was founded in 1976 by composer Iancu Dumitrescu and specializes in the performance of contemporary classical music. In particular, it is the main proponent of spectral music in Romania. The Ensemble's performances have been described as hyper-spectralist, transformational and acousmatic.

Hyperion has performed all over the world, and premiered the major works of Iancu Dumitrescu and Ana-Maria Avram. The group has featured on many radio broadcasts, LPs and CDs, most notably a 24-CD series of Dumitrescu and Avram's music.
