= Woof (label) =

British independent record label

Woof Records is a British independent record label founded by English musicians Tim Hodgkinson and Bill Gilonis in London in 1980.

== Background ==
Tim Hodgkinson and Bill Gilonis began experimenting with tape collages in 1979 and recorded I Do – I Do – I Don't – I Don't, an 18-minute collection of songs. Hodgkinson and Gilonis then created Woof Records to release the title on a 7-inch EP in 1980. They continued to release titles on the label, subject to the restriction that at least one of them had to play on, engineer, or produce each record. Between 1980 and 1994, 15 titles were released on the label.

== Releases ==
- WOOF 001, Bill Gilonis, Tim Hodgkinson, I Do – I Do – I Don't – I Don't, (7", EP), 1980
- WOOF 002, The Work, "I Hate America", (7", Single, Cle), 1981
- WOOF 003, The Work, Slow Crimes, (LP), 1982
- WOOF 005, The Work, The Worst of Everywhere, (Cass, Album, C-9), 1982
- WOOF 006, The Lowest Note on the Organ, The Lowest Note on the Organ, (7", Maxi), 1983
- WOOF 007, Catherine Jauniaux, Tim Hodgkinson, Fluvial, (LP), 1983
- WOOF 008, The Lowest Note on the Organ, "Piggy Bank", (7"), 1984
- WOOF 009, Het, Let's Het, (LP), 1984
- WOOF 010, Tim Hodgkinson, Splutter, (LP), 1985
- WOOF 011, The Momes, Spiralling, (LP), 1989
- WOOF 012, The Work, Rubber Cage, (LP, Album), 1989
- WOOF 013, Fred Frith, Tim Hodgkinson, Live Improvisations, (CD), 1992
- WOOF 014, Valentina Ponomareva, Ken Hyder / Tim Hodgkinson, The Goose, (CD, Album) 1992
- WOOF 015, The Work, See, (CD), 1992
- WOOF 016, Tim Hodgkinson, Each in Our Own Thoughts, (CD, Album), 1994
