= Bill Gilonis =

British musician

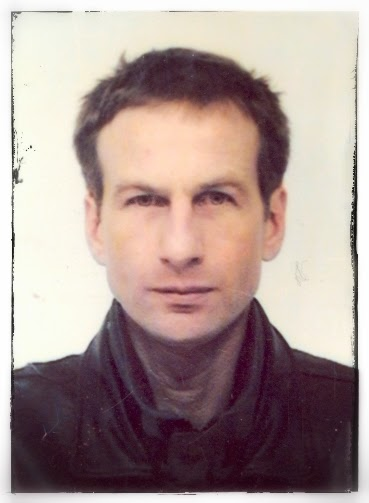

Background information
- Born: William Gilonis; 3 July 1958 (age 68); London, England
- Genres: Avant-rock, post-punk, experimental
- Occupations: Musician, Translator
- Instrument: Guitar
- Years active: 1979–present
- Labels: Recommended, Woof, Ad Hoc Records
- Website: www.gilonis.ch

Bill Gilonis (born 3 July 1958) is an English guitarist and composer. He co-founded the gritty experimental rock group The Work in 1980 with Tim Hodgkinson. The group was active intermittently until 1993, recording four albums and touring extensively, including in Russia, Japan Finland, Yugoslavia and Switzerland.

Gilonis has also worked as a producer, sound engineer and/or musician with (among others): Robert Wyatt, News from Babel (Chris Cutler, Lindsay Cooper, Zeena Parkins, Dagmar Krause), David Thomas, Peter Blegvad, Ut, Lindsay Cooper Film Music Group, Hail and The Hat Shoes (with Catherine Jauniaux, Tom Cora, Charles Hayward, and others). Other projects include: writing and recording the music for Frida Béraud's one-woman theatre piece, "Aus den Haaren gezogen"; a collaboration with Anja Burse on Wild Thing, an audio-visual installation piece; and a multi-media piece for the Val de Travers exhibition about Absinthe in Neuchatel, Switzerland (with Luigi Archetti, Jeroen Visser and Julien Baillod). He has been living in Zürich since 1993 where he has mixed and/or produced CDs by Swiss bands such as No Secrets in the Family, The Jellyfish Kiss and Lödig. His most recent recordings have been Zürich-Bamberg (Ad Hoc, 2008), a CD of electroacoustic compositions (together with Canadian composer Chantale Laplante); Calvary Greetings by the Anglo-Dutch-American band Stepmother (with Lukas Simonis, Jeroen Visser and Dave Kerman) - "a reunion of an 80s band that never existed but should have"; and Paragraphs and Principles by Officer! and around 30 guests.

In 2009, together with Alex Julyan, he published Lost in Translation, on Lost & Found Publishing. He currently plays with the six-piece brass and woodwind ensemble Blasnost, which is based in Zurich, and the GONG Improvisation Orchestra under the direction of Ruedi Debrunner.

== Selected discography ==
=== Albums ===
The Work

- Slow Crimes (1982, LP, Woof Records, UK)
- Live in Japan (1982, LP, Recommended Records, Japan)
- Rubber Cage (1989, LP/CD, Woof Records, UK)
- See (1992, CD, Woof Records, UK)
- The 4th World (2010, CD, Ad Hoc Records, USA)

Lindsay Cooper, Chris Cutler, Bill Gilonis, Tim Hodgkinson and Robert Wyatt

- The Last Nightingale (1984, LP, Recommended Records, UK)

News from Babel

- Letters Home (1985, LP/CD, Recommended Records, UK)

The Hat Shoes

- Differently Desperate (1992, LP/CD, RecRec, Switzerland)
- Home (2002, CD, RecRec, Switzerland)

Bill Gilonis & Chantale Laplante

- Zürich-Bamberg (2008, CD, Ad Hoc Records, USA)

Stepmother, (Lukas Simonis, Bill Gilonis, Jeroen Visser and Dave Kerman)

- Calvary Greetings (2014/2015), CD/LP, Megaphone / Knock'em Dead Records, USA)

Officer!, (Mick Hobbs, Felix Fiedorowicz, Bill Gilonis and 30 guests)

- Paragraphs and Principles (2021/2022), CD/LP, Klanggalerie, Austria / Jelodanti Records, France)

Compilation (The Lowest Note + The Work + Bill Gilonis/Tim Hodgkinson)

- WOOF 7 inches (2004, CD, Ad Hoc Records, USA)
