= RēR Quarterly =

English sound-magazine

Rē Records Quarterly Vol.1 No.1 LP and magazine.

The RēR Quarterly (also known as Rē Records Quarterly and RēR Records Quarterly) was an English "quarterly" sound-magazine comprising an LP record and a magazine. It was published at irregular intervals between 1985 and 1997 by Recommended Records and November Books, and edited by English percussionist, lyricist and music theorist Chris Cutler. It was sold internationally by Recommended Records via mail order and in specialist record shops.

A total of thirteen issues were published (four volumes of four, four, three and two issues respectively) plus two "collection" issues featuring music selections from volumes 1 and 2. From volume 4 the LP was replaced by a CD and the CD and the magazine (now entitled unFILEd: The RēR Sourcebook) were sold separately or together as a set.

== Background ==
The idea for RēR Quarterly began in 1982 when Recommended Records released the Recommended Records Sampler, a sampler double album by various artists that contained newly recorded and previously unreleased work by musicians and groups on the Recommended Records catalogue at the time.

The record in each issue of RēR Quarterly contained previously unreleased music by artists from across the world, including commissioned pieces, projects and live recordings. The A4 magazine (varying from 42 to 112 pages per issue) included artwork and theoretical and practical articles on music, often by the composers and performers featured on the record. In keeping with the goals of Recommended Records and its prime mover, Rock in Opposition, a number of new musicians and groups appeared on the records, many having their music published internationally for the first time.

Editor Chris Cutler described the RēR Quarterly as:

... firstly a sound magazine – not a sampler or a compilation, but a window on what was happening, essays in the possibilities of sound, introduction to new people. And secondly a printed magazine without the usual interviews and reviews, avoiding the language and outlook of the vapid music press ...

=== Distribution ===
RēR Quarterly was distributed primarily to international subscribers by Recommended Records in London. Individual issues were also sold by the record label and other specialist record stores. Subscribers received special Subscription Editions that were numbered and signed, and included "something extra". For example, issue 1/1 included additional artwork by Peter Blegvad from his and John Greaves's 1977 album, Kew. Rhone., and issue 1/2 contained a cassette tape of Soviet pop songs from the early 1980s (at that time musicians in the former Soviet Union had little to no exposure in the West).

=== Name ===
When the RēR Quarterly was first published in 1985, it was entitled The Rē Records Quarterly, "Rē" being the label Cutler had set up for his own projects in 1978 alongside Recommended Records which served for distribution, mailorder and as a label for outside projects. In 1988 the name changed to The RēR Records Quarterly since the distinction between the two operations no longer needed to be marked. In 1994 the magazine title was reduced to The RēR Quarterly, which remained until it mutated again into the Sourcebook series.

=== Frequency ===
While RēR Quarterly was intended to be a quarterly sound-magazine, the gaps between issues varied from four months to four years. Cutler remarked that "It was always hard to get sufficient material of quality for the Quarterly, and so it always took a long time to prepare each issue." Most of the pieces featured on the disc and magazine were commissioned, and as the magazine's circulation was small and it received no subsidy (each issue generally ran at a loss), the contributors received very little for their work. In addition, Cutler was not a full-time editor of the magazine and preparing each issue had to be squeezed into his schedule of recording, touring and running Recommended Records.

== Reception ==
Paul Oldfield wrote in the English music newspaper Melody Maker in 1985: "[RēR Quarterly] is the pursuit of unimaginable, packed in artwork of giddy luminescence."

In a review of Vol. 4 No. 1 at AllMusic, François Couture wrote that the music on the CD covers a broad range of styles, and that "[i]t takes wide ears and a solid stomach to switch from Cornelius Cardew's sweet-and-sour orchestral music to N.O.R.M.A.'s street band exuberance". He praised the tracks by Thinking Plague, Tom Nunn, Al Margolis and N.O.R.M.A., and said the album is "important" because pieces by Les Sales Combles, Diledadafish and Koongoortoog are the only recorded works left by these "occulted projects". Couture described this CD as "an accurate snapshot" of avant-garde music at the time, and gave it 3 stars out of 5.

Tom Schulte gave the Vol. 4 No. 2 CD 3 stars out of 5 in a review at AllMusic. He wrote that the album highlights include "[w]ave-like shapes of ambient noise" in "Feu Brilliant" by Keith Rowe and Alaid De Phillips, and extracts from a live radio performance in "After Hours" / "The Colour of Blood" by Shelley Hirsch, Jon Rose and Chris Cutler. Schulte called the latter a "very interesting listen" and described it as a "collage of conversation and instrumentation" that sounds like a "bizarre radio play".

== Issues ==
=== Volume 1 ===
All tracks written by the artist, except where noted.

Rē Records Quarterly Vol.1 No.1 (LP, Recommended Records Rē 0101, May 1985)
No.	Title	Artist	Length
1.	"The Threshold of Liberty"	Steve Moore	9:25
2.	"Experiment"	Lars Hollmer	1:19
3.	"Education"	Chris Cutler and Lindsay Cooper	3:45
4.	"Compromisation" (Dave Kerman)	5uu's	3:00
5.	"Dans les Yeux Bleues"	Joseph Racaille	1:10
6.	"Naiwabi"	The Lowest Note	2:35
7.	"Sorry 'bout That"	Adrian Mitchell	1:50
8.	"Prayer for Civilisation" (Warrick Sony)	Kalahari Surfers	5:02
9.	"Indefinite"	Mission Impossible	2:58
10.	"Pensa un Numero"	Stefano Delu	2:13
11.	"Song in Space"	Adrian Mitchell	0:35
12.	"A Walk Around the Brewery"	Mikoláš Chadima	6:06
13.	"Saw It in the Paper"	Adrian Mitchell	3:40

- Source Discogs

Rē Records Quarterly Vol.1 No.2 (LP, Recommended Records Rē 0102, September 1985)
No.	Title	Artist	Length
1.	"Berlin Programme" (Brecht, Eisler, Cutler, Frith, Goebbels, Harth, Cora, Krause, Lewis)	Duck and Cover	27:44
2.	"Mystery Tapes 1"	John Oswald	6:04
3.	"Märzfeber"	Conrad Bauer	6:44
4.	"Fluent" (Andrzej Karpiński)	Reportaż	3:13
5.	"Battle-painter's Song" (Karpiński)	Reportaż	2:11
6.	"The Day When Truth Was not Existed" (Karpiński)	Reportaż	2:58
7.	"Stufferation"	Adrian Mitchell	1:42

- Source Discogs

Rē Records Quarterly Vol.1 No.3 (LP, Recommended Records Rē 0103, January 1986)
No.	Title	Artist	Length
1.	"Card to Bernard" (Peter Blegvad)	The Big Guns	2:42
2.	"Early Rest Home" (Whitlow, Wilson, Piersel, Scholbe, Katsimpalis, Sharp)	Biota	9:40
3.	"Pigs"	Robert Wyatt	2:40
4.	"Sprung from Traps"	Roger Turner	5:05
5.	"Little Red Bombadier"	Kontroll Csoport	4:13
6.	"Woman of Water"	Adrian Mitchell	1:16
7.	"Coste"	Cassix	1:52
8.	"Criota"	Cassix	2:42
9.	"Religion"	Cassix	2:30
10.	"The Stanislavsky Method"	Cassix	1:07
11.	"Tempo di Pace, Bari"	Cassix	3:52
12.	"Copy Machine"	Cassix	1:46
13.	"Finta di Nulla"	Cassix	1:54
14.	"Nadja"	Nazca	4:21

- Source Discogs

Rē Records Quarterly Vol.1 No.4 (LP, Recommended Records Rē 0104, May 1986)
No.	Title	Artist	Length
1.	"After Dinner"	After Dinner	2:55
2.	"A Walnut"	After Dinner	3:05
3.	"RE" (Tadahiko Yokogawa)	After Dinner	4:29
4.	"A Man of Marble"	After Dinner	2:56
5.	"Glass Tube"	After Dinner	4:34
6.	"L'heure des Louves" (Joane Hétu, Diane Labrosse)	Wondeur Brass	5:15
7.	"Раз, Два (1, 2)"	Strange Games	4:31
8.	"Hermetic Discourse"	Steve Moore	6:32
9.	"C'est Bon la Viande!"	Art Moulu Tréfin	4:54
10.	"The Murder of the Poet Michael Smith by Three Men in Kingston, Jamaica"	Adrian Mitchell	0:40
11.	"Power"	The Black Sheep	4:18
12.	"Cantate 159" (Bach, arr. Duchesne)	André Duchesne	5:13
13.	"Staying Awake"	Adrian Mitchell	1:31

- Source Discogs

=== Volume 2 ===
All tracks written by the artist, except where noted.

Rē Records Quarterly Vol.2 No.1 (LP, Recommended Records Rē 0201, May 1987)
No.	Title	Artist	Length
1.	"Puptent"	Blitzoids	3:45
2.	"Imperialism of the Future"	Ůr	4:38
3.	"The Same Thing" (Willie Dixon)	Henry Kaiser, Michael Maxymenko and Bill Frisell	5:50
4.	"Wedding" (Iva Bittová, Pavel Fajt, Karel David)	Iva Bittová and Pavel Fajt	4:52
5.	"Plains of Hungary"	Anthony Moore	11:00
6.	"Parade"	John Oswald	11:10
7.	"Pégase" (Joseph Racaille, arr. Christophe Baillot)	Joseph Racaille	1:14
8.	"Nivelles"	This Heat	5:48
9.	"The Egg & I" (Anton Fier, David Thomas)	David Thomas & The Accordion Club	3:31
10.	"It Happened to Me" (Thomas)	David Thomas & The Accordion Club	2:33

- Source Discogs

Rē Records Quarterly Vol.2 No.2 (LP, Recommended Records Rē 0202, Autumn 1987)
No.	Title	Artist	Length
1.	"In Life's Hand" (Dave Kerman)	5uu's	4:35
2.	"Chairman Mao" (Charlie Haden, Robert Wyatt)	Robert Wyatt	6:19
3.	"Yeah Mom"	John French	3:47
4.	"From Suite 'Koradi'"	Arturo Meza	12:22
5.	"Suite (Resume 84–86)" (Stevan Tickmayer)	Intellectual Cabare	11:48
6.	"Christi Crucifixi Ultima Verba"	Jocelyn Robert	5:28
7.	"Dance"	Hunk Ai!	5:22
8.	"The Barking Dogs Versus the Minimalists"	Henry Kaiser	3:42

- Source Discogs

RēR Records Quarterly Vol.2 No.3 (LP, Recommended Records RēR 0203, 1988)
No.	Title	Artist	Length
1.	"Klangfarbenprobes (Episodes Excerpt)"	John Oswald	2:02
2.	"Warsong (For Lovers Only)"	Roberto Musci and Giovanni Venosta	3:03
3.	"Redens" / "Orbiston Parva"	Luciano Margorani	3:06
4.	"Brave It" (Amy Denio)	Tone Dogs	4:35
5.	"Engine of Myth"	David Myers	2:44
6.	"Warheads"	James Grigsby	4:28
7.	"Under Xmas Tree" (Lars Pedersen)	When	3:48
8.	"Tango"	Kampec Dolores	3:43
9.	"Tra le due Inghilterre"	La 1919	3:35
10.	"Pageant for Blinking Signal" (James Grigsby)	James Grigsby and Brad Laner	1:44
11.	"Flaubears Dancing"	J. Lachan	4:48
12.	"Moyen-âge"	Miriodor	9:00

- Source Discogs

RēR Records Quarterly Vol.2 No.4 (LP, Recommended Records RēR 0204, 1989)
No.	Title	Artist	Length
1.	"Todesanzeige"	Expander Des Fortschritts	5:40
2.	"Cairo: Khan Al Khaki"	Werner Kodytek	8:50
3.	"Picasso's Last Stand" (Jim Meneses)	Increase the Angle	4:15
4.	"All Thumbs"	Bill Gilonis	4:06
5.	"Os Monomakhos"	Dimosiypalliliko Retire	4:12
6.	"Cut"	Lutz Glandien	11:45
7.	"Organism"	Thinking Plague	8:37
8.	"USA/Intolerance"	Jean Derome	1:33
9.	"Italy/Resistance"	Jean Derome	2:14
10.	"Ghana/Hope"	Jean Derome	3:35

- Source Discogs

=== Volume 3 ===
All tracks written by the artist, except where noted.

RēR Records Quarterly Vol.3 No.1 (LP, Recommended Records RēR 0301, 1989)
No.	Title	Artist	Length
1.	"Iranian Rock"	Steve Moore	7:01
2.	"Bakerloo Boogaloo" (Will Menter)	Overflow	7:33
3.	"Bells"	Don Wherry	11:40
4.	"War is Deception" (Christoph Anders)	State of War	3:45
5.	"Vox-5"	Trevor Wishart	5:37
6.	"Anything's Possible"	ZGA	2:15
7.	"Duchesne Téléphone"	René Lussier	2:14
8.	"Christmas Message"	René Lussier	2:46
9.	"Extrait du Manifeste du 'Front de libération du Québec'"	René Lussier	3:29
10.	"Government of Love"	Bing Selfish & The Ideals	4:29
11.	"Working Stiff"	Murphy Working Stiffs	2:32

- Source Discogs

RēR Records Quarterly Vol.3 No.2 (LP, Recommended Records RēR 0302, 1990)
No.	Title	Artist	Length
1.	"Pressure Inversion Ratios"	David Myers and Alex Ross
2.	"Es Lebe"	Lutz Glandien
3.	"Stone Music"	Zygmunt Krauze
4.	"Music from 'The Bacchae'"	Rasmus Lunding
5.	"Dedicated to Marina D."	Ne Zhdali
6.	"Release"	Charles Southern
7.	"The Old Pianola" (Pierre Bastien)	Mecanium

- Source Discogs

RēR Records Quarterly Vol.3 No.3 (LP, Recommended Records RēR 0303, 1991)
No.	Title	Artist	Length
1.	"Chiaroscuro"	Steve Moore	7:00
2.	"Photo Project 1"	Jocelyn Robert	2:22
3.	"Bell" (Lars Pedersen)	When	6:25
4.	"Tombo"	Tom Djll	5:05
5.	"Racer Hero" (Susanne Lewis)	Hail	3:33
6.	"Microclimats" (Marc Pira, Pierre Chuchana)	Illegal Function	9:19
7.	"Carousel of Progress" (Dave Kerman, Sanjay Kumar)	5uu's	5:22
8.	"Intense Grace" (Dave Fox)	Abdo Men	3:16
9.	"Diary XI-XV"	Erik Hug	7:30

- Source Discogs

=== Volume 4 ===
All tracks written by the artist, except where noted.

RēR Quarterly Vol.4 No.1 (CD, Recommended Records RēR 0401, 1994)
No.	Title	Artist	Length
1.	Untitled	Koongoortoog	4:00
2.	"Ostrich Wheel" (Django Bates)	The Adenoid Quartet	7:20
3.	"Z"	John Oswald	0:18
4.	"TP2" (Doug Carroll)	Tom Nunn	7:24
5.	"What's the Point?"	Diledadafish	2:09
6.	"The Desk" (Warrick Sony)	Lesego Rampolokeng with the Kalahari Surfers	3:41
7.	"Vietnam's Victory"	Cornelius Cardew	6:26
8.	"Death in 40 Pictures"	Peter Machajdík	2:27
9.	"Circus Music" (Tiziano Popoli)	Tiziano Popoli and N.O.R.M.A.	8:59
10.	"Sonnet 2"	Al Margolis	2:39
11.	"The Unknown (No. 4)"	David Lee Myers	2:43
12.	"How to Clean Squid"	Thinking Plague	5:41
13.	"Lost Title"	ZGA	3:19
14.	"Walk Aside"	Biota	4:14
15.	"The Cross and the Circle"	Martin Burlas	5:41
16.	"Chair"	Blitzoids	3:36
17.	"Les cons ont Dansé" / "Lait Condensé" (Yves Chichillos Hausermann)	Les Sales Combles	3:42
18.	"Encore"	Chris Cutler and Fred Frith	1:16

- Source Discogs

RēR Quarterly Vol.4 No.2 (CD, Recommended Records RēR 0402, 1997)
No.	Title	Artist	Length
1.	"Sacrifice to Isis"	Q.R. Ghazala	2:22
2.	"Three Cold Floors"	Mike Hovancsek and Paul Guerguerian	3:59
3.	"Inception"	Tom Dimuzio	4:10
4.	"Short-Cuts: Brahms"	Marie Goyette	4:25
5.	"Danseuse"	Ken Ando	5:06
6.	"Congo"	Robert Iolini	1:40
7.	"Zimbabwe"	Robert Iolini	2:27
8.	"From 'Le Ombre di Otello'"	Giovanni Venosta	3:28
9.	"Feu Brilliant"	Keith Rowe and Alain De Filippis	5:18
10.	"Shenandoah" / "Innsbruck"	Brian Woodbury's Variety Orchestra	5:30
11.	"The Unthinkable"	Richard Barrett	6:27
12.	"Heterophony"	Stevan Tickmayer	7:02
13.	"Des Objets de la Plus Grande Importance" (Gigou Chenevier)	Volapük	3:26
14.	"Interludium: Two Drums"	Boris Kovač	2:46
15.	"Virgo Ramayana"	Philip Perkins	6:00
16.	"After Hours" / "The Colour of Blood"	Shelley Hirsch, Jon Rose and Chris Cutler	4:40

- Source Discogs

=== Selections ===
All tracks written by the artist, except where noted.

RēR Quarterly Selections from Vol.1 (CD, Recommended Records RēR QCD1, 1991)
No.	Title	Artist	Length
1.	"Mystery Tapes"	John Oswald	6:07
2.	"Berlin Programme" (Brecht, Eisler, Cutler, Frith, Goebbels, Harth, Cora, Krause, Lewis)	Duck and Cover	27:41
3.	"Hermetic Discourse"	Steve Moore	6:45
4.	"Religion"	Cassix	2:32
5.	"The Stanislavsky Method"	Cassix	1:11
6.	"Tempo di Pace, Bari"	Cassix	3:56
7.	"Copy Machine"	Cassix	1:49
8.	"Finta di Nulla"	Cassix	1:59
9.	"The Birth of Compomisation" (Dave Kerman)	5uu's	2:53
10.	"The Threshold of Liberty"	Steve Moore	9:32
11.	"Early Rest Home" (Whitlow, Wilson, Piersel, Scholbe, Katsimpalis, Sharp)	Biota	9:43

- Source Discogs

RēR Quarterly Selections from Vol.2 (CD, Recommended Records RēR QCD2, 1991)
No.	Title	Artist	Length
1.	"Chairman Mao" (Charlie Haden, Robert Wyatt)	Robert Wyatt	6:15
2.	"Wedding" (Iva Bittová, Pavel Fajt, Karel David)	Iva Bittová and Pavel Fajt	4:52
3.	"Tra le due Inghilterre"	La 1919	3:33
4.	"Christi Crucifixi Ultima Verba"	Jocelyn Robert	5:29
5.	"Pageant for Blinking Signal" (James Grigsby)	James Grigsby and Brad Laner	1:42
6.	"Flaubears Dancing"	J. Lachan	4:47
7.	"The Barking Dogs Versus the Minimalists"	Henry Kaiser	3:39
8.	"Picasso's Last Stand" (Jim Meneses)	Increase the Angle	4:15
9.	"All Thumbs"	Bill Gilonis	4:07
10.	"The Egg & I" (Anton Fier, David Thomas)	David Thomas & The Accordion Club	3:28
11.	"Pégase" (Joseph Racaille, arr. Christophe Baillot)	Joseph Racaille	1:14
12.	"Klangfarbenprobe"	John Oswald	2:00
13.	"Warsong"	Roberto Musci and Giovanni Venosta	2:46
14.	""Redens" / "Orbiston Parva""	Luciano Margorani	3:07
15.	"In Life's Hand" (Dave Kerman)	5uu's	4:36
16.	"Warheads"	James Grigsby	4:30
17.	"Under Xmas Tree" (Lars Pedersen)	When	3:48
18.	"USA Intolerance"	Jean Derome	1:33
19.	"Italy Resistance"	Jean Derome	2:14
20.	"Ghana Hope"	Jean Derome	3:54

- Source Discogs
