= Half a True Day =

Studio album by Biota
- Released: November 26, 2007
- Recorded: Fall 2002 – Summer 2007
- Studio: Dys Studios (Bellvue, CO)
- Genre: Experimental music, electroacoustic music, musique concrète
- Length: 69:31
- Label: ReR
- Producer: Biota

Biota chronology
Invisible Map (2001)	Half a True Day (2007)	Cape Flyaway (2012)

Professional ratings
Review scores
Source	Rating
Allmusic	2.5/5 stars

Half a True Day is the thirteenth studio album by experimental music ensemble Biota, released on November 26, 2007 by ReR Megacorp.

== Track listing ==
All music is composed by Biota.

No.	Title	Length
1.	"Figure Question"	1:45
2.	"Pack-and-Penny Day"	1:35
3.	"Hidden Compartment"	1:32
4.	"Angle of Doubt"	2:54
5.	"Proven Within Half; Half a True Day"	8:19
6.	"Accidental Photograph"	2:44
7.	"Winding Nth"	10:30
8.	"Moth Across"	2:56
9.	"Silent Grove"	2:41
10.	"Just Now Maybe"	2:21
11.	"Another Name"	3:53
12.	"Turn the Moon"	3:11
13.	"Globemallow, Left Untold"	3:02
14.	"Cloud Chamber"	2:37
15.	"Where No One Knows"	2:28
16.	"Antimagnet"	2:26
17.	"Passerine"	14:37

== Personnel ==
Adapted from the Half a True Day liner notes.

Biota

- Steve Emmons – electronics
- Kristianne Gale – guitar, spoken word
- James Gardner – flugelhorn
- Rolf Goranson – tape, electronics, spoken word
- Tom Katsimpalis – guitar, bass guitar, clavioline, tape, ektara, mixing
- Andy Kredt – guitar
- Randy Miotke – Rhodes piano, engineering, mastering
- Mark Piersel – guitar
- Steve Scholbe – guitar, bass guitar, rubab
- William Sharp – tape, electronics, engineering, mixing, design
- C.W. Vrtacek – piano
- Gordon H. Whitlow – accordion, Rhodes piano, autoharp, khene
- Larry Wilson – drums, congas, mbira, tabla, percussion, mixing, design
- Randy Yeates – Micromoog, keyboards
- David Zekman – violin, mandolin

Production and additional personnel

- Biota – production, mixing, arrangements
- Jerry Schneyer – engineering

== Release history ==
Region	Date	Label	Format	Catalog
United States	2007	ReR	CD	RēRBCD6
