= Invisible Map =

Studio album by Biota
- Released: June 5, 2001
- Recorded: Spring 1996 – Summer 2000
- Studio: Dys Studios (Bellvue, CO)
- Genre: Avant-prog, experimental music
- Length: 76:08
- Label: ReR
- Producer: Biota

Biota chronology
Object Holder (1995)	Invisible Map (2001)	Half a True Day (2007)

Professional ratings
Review scores
Source	Rating
Allmusic	4.5/5 stars

Invisible Map is the twelfth studio album by experimental music ensemble Biota, released on June 5, 2001 by ReR Megacorp.

== Reception ==
AllMusic.com states, "With its wide range covering delicate post-folkish pop songs to ambient soundscapes, Invisible Map may be the collective's most accomplished and accessible release to date. All music styles (folk, jazz, blues, rock, musique concrète, free improv, etc.) coalesce to be filtered through the dreamer's ears — background vocals are slightly treated, soloing instruments are heard from a distance, rhythm tracks are deliberately just a bit out of sync. This way, the simple tunes never really come into focus, giving the whole album an aura of mystery."

== Track listing ==
All music is composed by Biota.

No.	Title	Length
1.	"Moment"	0:44
2.	"The Rapid Color"	3:46
3.	"Port"	2:59
4.	"Call"	2:36
5.	"Landless"	2:39
6.	"Air on Water"	0:29
7.	"Mineral"	3:19
8.	"Common Broom"	2:12
9.	"Birthday"	3:29
10.	"Dustman"	0:52
11.	"Sleeping Car"	2:25
12.	"Snake Out"	3:21
13.	"Occurrence"	1:36
14.	"Top Ray Done"	1:58
15.	"Glass Lizard"	2:08
16.	"Telegraph Plant"	0:56
17.	"Spoonbender's Visit"	0:54
18.	"Remodel a Whisper"	0:32
19.	"Measured Not Found"	3:22
20.	"The Slow Forest"	4:30
21.	"Canopy"	0:46
22.	"Red's Big Day"	1:32
23.	"Lampblack"	1:33
24.	"There Is Probably Something"	0:37
25.	"Worry Hill"	1:28
26.	"Olive Drab Marionette"	1:15
27.	"Invisible Gap"	1:19
28.	"Yarn"	3:18
29.	"Words Disappear"	1:22
30.	"Ballad Of"	2:05
31.	"Soil & Token"	1:37
32.	"Glazed Paper"	3:21
33.	"Paste"	3:08
34.	"Truth Table"	0:56
35.	"Dual"	3:23
36.	"Flicker"	2:38
37.	"Presto the Human"	1:03

== Personnel ==
Adapted from the Invisible Map liner notes.

Biota

- James Gardner – Rhodes piano, flugelhorn, trumpet, flute, Irish tin whistle, percussion
- Geneviève Heistek – lead vocals, backing vocals, violin
- Tom Katsimpalis – guitar, bass guitar, mandolin, balalaika, clavioline, pump organ, ocarina, backing vocals
- Steve Scholbe – bass clarinet, alto saxophone, clarinet, guitar, bass guitar, zither, rubab, Hawaiian tremoloa, hurdy-gurdy, Marxophone
- William Sharp – tape, hurdy-gurdy, engineering, mixing
- C.W. Vrtacek – piano
- Gordon H. Whitlow – accordion, Rhodes piano, Estey pump organ, clavioline, backing vocals
- Larry Wilson – drums, bongos, congas, Madal, percussion
- Randy Yeates – keyboards

Additional musicians

- Andy Kredt – guitar (2, 35, 36)
- Mark Piersel – guitar (6, 21, 22, 24)

Production and additional personnel

- Biota – production, mixing, arrangements
- Randy Miotke – engineering

== Release history ==
Region	Date	Label	Format	Catalog
United States	2001	ReR	CD	RēRBCD4
