= Object Holder =

Studio album by Biota
- Released: 1995
- Recorded: 1992–1994
- Studio: Dys Studios (Fort Collins, CO)
- Genre: Avant-prog, Experimental music
- Length: 70:11
- Label: ReR

Biota chronology
Almost Never (1992)	Object Holder (1995)	Invisible Map (2001)

Professional ratings
Review scores
Source	Rating
All About Jazz	4.5/5 stars
Allmusic	3/5 stars

Object Holder is the eleventh studio album by the experimental music ensemble Biota, released in 1995 by ReR Megacorp.

== Track listing ==
All music is composed by Biota.

No.	Title	Length
1.	"Bumpreader"	7:52
2.	"Spillway"	4:15
3.	"Eavesdrop"	1:46
4.	"Blind Corner"	2:21
5.	"Under the Hat"	1:33
6.	"Flatwheel"	2:08
7.	"Reckoning Falls"	2:40
8.	"Swallow"	0:39
9.	"Move"	1:14
10.	"Steam Trader"	2:49
11.	"Understander"	2:43
12.	"Private Wire"	3:03
13.	"Cinder"	1:25
14.	"Distraction"	5:41
15.	"Signal"	3:33
16.	"This Ridge"	0:44
17.	"Idea for a Wagon"	3:21
18.	"More Silence"	4:02
19.	"Coat"	1:58
20.	"Gate Climbing"	5:31
21.	"Protector"	3:03
22.	"Visible Gap"	1:38
23.	"The Trunk"	4:03
24.	Untitled	2:09

== Personnel ==
Adapted from the Object Holder liner notes.

Biota

- James Gardner – piano, flugelhorn, nae แน (hextuple reed instrument)
- Tom Katsimpalis – guitar, clavioline, pump organ
- Susanne Lewis – lead vocals, backing vocals
- Steve Scholbe – bass clarinet, alto saxophone, clarinet, guitar, zither, rubab, Hawaiian tremoloa, hurdy-gurdy
- William Sharp – hurdy-gurdy, tape, engineering
- C.W. Vrtacek – piano
- Gordon H. Whitlow – Rhodes piano, Estey pump organ, accordion, xylophone, guitar, mandolin, whistle
- Larry Wilson – drums, bongos, congas, Madal, Tar, percussion

Additional musicians

- Chris Cutler – electronics and percussion (4, 14, 20, 23)
- Andy Kredt – guitar (12, 19, 23)
- Randy Yeates – keyboards (2, 13, 18), mbira (1)

Production and additional personnel

- Aric Johnson – engineering
- Joan McAninch – engineering
- Randy Miotke – engineering
- Dirk Vallons – design

== Release history ==
Region	Date	Label	Format	Catalog
United States	1995	ReR	CD	RēRBCD4
