= Tumble (album) =

Studio album by Biota
- Released: 1989
- Recorded: Autumn 1988 – Spring 1989
- Studio: Dys Studios (Fort Collins, CO)
- Genre: Avant-prog, Experimental music
- Length: 73:50
- Label: ReR
- Producer: Tom Katsimpalis, Mark Piersel, Steve Scholbe, William Sharp, Gordon H. Whitlow, Larry Wilson, Randy Yeates

Biota chronology
Awry (1988)	Tumble (1989)	Almost Never (1992)

Professional ratings
Review scores
Source	Rating
Allmusic	2.5/5 stars

Tumble is the ninth studio album by the experimental electronic music ensemble Biota, released in 1989 by ReR Megacorp.

== Background ==
The album was commissioned by the ReR label for the purposes of "using the maximum available parameters offered" by the nascent compact disc recording medium.

== Track listing ==
All music is composed by Biota, except "Shadows Appear to Do" by Deborah Fuller and "...Buffalo Come Back" by C.W. Vrtacek.

No.	Title	Length
1.	"New Lookout"	2:58
2.	"One Eye Open"	3:17
3.	"Things Seem Like Just Happen"	5:16
4.	"Wire Talker"	6:32
5.	"Shadows Appear to Do"	7:05
6.	"Picture by Accident"	7:21
7.	"House of Suitcase"	4:58
8.	"Finder"	1:22
9.	"...Buffalo Come Back"	5:44
10.	"Operator for Cataract"	6:39
11.	"When They Know"	5:55
12.	"The Less Said"	7:14
13.	"blank track"	0:14
14.	"Ghost Shirt"	9:15

== Personnel ==
Adapted from the Tumble liner notes.

Biota

- Tom Katsimpalis – organ, guitar, bass guitar, banjo, harmonica, flute, cover art, design
- Mark Piersel – trumpet, guitar, bass guitar, banjo, sheng, psaltery, ukulele, recorder, balafon, organ, tape, engineering
- Steve Scholbe – alto saxophone, bass clarinet, flute, guitar, organ, autoharp, bells
- William Sharp – tape, engineering, design
- Gordon H. Whitlow – bass guitar, guitar, piano, organ, accordion, engineering
- Larry Wilson – drums, bongos, bodhrán, bells
- Randy Yeates – concertina

Additional musicians

- Deborah Fuller – violin (5)
- C.W. Vrtacek – piano and ukulele (9)

Production and additional personnel

- Biota – production, mixing, arrangements
- Mark Derbyshire – engineering
- Dick Kezlan – photography
- Richard Pena – engineering
- Bill Tindall – engineering

== Release history ==
Region	Date	Label	Format	Catalog
United States	1989	ReR	CD	RēRBCD
