= Horde (album) =

Album by Biota

Studio album by Mnemonists
- Released: 1981
- Recorded: June 1980 – May 1981
- Studio: Pendragon (Fort Collins, CO)
- Genre: Drone, sound collage
- Length: 38:22
- Label: Dys
- Producer: Mark Derbyshire, Steve Scholbe, William Sharp

Biota chronology
Some Attributes of a Living System (1980)	Horde (1981)	Roto-Limbs (1981)

Professional ratings
Review scores
Source	Rating
AllMusic	3/5 stars

Horde is the third studio album by the free improvisation ensemble Mnemonist Orchestra, released in 1981 by Dys Records.

== Track listing ==
Side one
No.	Title	Music	Length
1.	"Puncture/Throng"	Mark Derbyshire, William Sharp	3:09
2.	"Digesting War (In Two Portions)"	Mark Derbyshire, Steve Scholbe, William Sharp	3:43
3.	"The Undergrowth"	Sara Thompson	1:28
4.	"Resurgence"	Mark Derbyshire, Steve Scholbe, William Sharp, Sara Thompson	2:24
5.	"Crucible"	Mark Derbyshire, William Sharp	2:38
6.	"The Horde"	Mark Derbyshire, Steve Scholbe, William Sharp, Sara Thompson	5:01

Side two
No.	Title	Music	Length
1.	"Limbs"	Mark Derbyshire, William Sharp	3:43
2.	"Torpor (The Back of a Brain)"	Mark Derbyshire, Steve Scholbe, William Sharp	3:04
3.	"A Lingering History"	Mark Derbyshire, William Sharp	3:50
4.	"Triptych"	Mark Derbyshire, William Sharp	9:22

== Personnel ==
Adapted from the Horde liner notes.

Mnemonists

- Mark Derbyshire – cello, crumhorn, sampler, tape, production, engineering
- Steve Scholbe – alto saxophone, clarinet, electric guitar, production
- William Sharp – piano, tape, clarinet, spoken word, production
- Sara Thompson – double bass, piano

Additional musicians

- Amy Derbyshire – viola and crumhorn (A4), recorder (A6)
- Crystal Goldberg – bass guitar (B1)
- Mark Heglund – bass guitar (A2)
- Torger Hougen – spoken word, illustrations
- Tom Katsimpalis – spoken word, illustrations
- Ken Lark – drums (A2, B4)
- Randy Yeates – spoken word, illustrations

Production and additional personnel

- James Dixon – cover art, illustrations

== Release history ==
Region	Date	Label	Format	Catalog
United States	1981	Dys	LP	DYS 03
United Kingdom	1984	Recommended	LP	RR C21
United Kingdom	1998	ReR Megacorp	CD	RéR MN1
