= Tinct =

Studio album by Biota
- Released: 1988
- Recorded: Summer 1986 – Spring 1987
- Studio: Bughouse and Dys Studios (Loveland and Fort Collins, CO)
- Genre: Experimental music, electroacoustic music, musique concrète
- Length: 29:41
- Label: Recommended
- Producer: Tom Katsimpalis, Mark Piersel, Steve Scholbe, William Sharp, Jim Steinborn, Gordon H. Whitlow, Larry Wilson, Randy Yeates

Biota chronology
| Bellowing Room (1987) | Tinct (1988) | Awry (1988) |

Tinct is the eighth studio album by the American experimental electronic music ensemble Biota, released in 1988 by Recommended Records.

== Track listing ==
All music is composed by Tom Katsimpalis, Mark Piersel, Steve Scholbe, William Sharp, Jim Steinborn, Gordon H. Whitlow, Larry Wilson, and Randy Yeates.

Side one
| No. | Title | Length |
|---|---|---|
| 1. | "Tottery" | 4:03 |
| 2. | "Motives" | 4:09 |
| 3. | "Riddled" | 6:57 |

Side two
| No. | Title | Length |
|---|---|---|
| 1. | "Astray" | 7:10 |
| 2. | "Lapse" | 7:18 |

== Personnel ==
Adapted from the Tinct liner notes.

Biota

- Tom Katsimpalis – organ, guitar, bass guitar, autoharp, harmonica, recorder, bells, spoken word, production, mixing
- Mark Piersel – trumpet, guitar, banjo, sheng, psaltery, ukulele, organ, percussion, spoken word, production, engineering, mixing
- Steve Scholbe – alto saxophone, bass clarinet, flute, guitar, sheng, bells, percussion, production, mixing
- William Sharp – tape, organ, bass clarinet, percussion, spoken word, production, engineering, mixing
- Jim Steinborn – pipe organ, production, mixing
- Gordon H. Whitlow – bass guitar, guitar, piano, accordion, production, mixing
- Larry Wilson – drums, congas, bongos, bodhrán, production, mixing
- Randy Yeates – mbira, piano, production, mixing

Production and additional personnel

- Ken DeVries – cover art
- Roger Seibel – mastering

== Release history ==
| Region | Date | Label | Format | Catalog |
|---|---|---|---|---|
| United States | 1988 | Recommended | LP | RR C31 |
