= Biota =

A Biota is the assemblage of living organisms in a specific place and time:

- Biota (ecology), or biome, the plant and animal life of a region

It may also mean:

- Biota (plant), or Platycladus orientalis, a coniferous tree
- Biota!, a proposed aquarium in London
- Biota, Cinco Villas, a municipality in Aragon, Spain
- Biota (band), an American experimental electronic music ensemble
  - Biota (album), a 1982 album by the Mnemonist Orchestra, which later became Biota
