= Bellowing Room =

Studio album by Biota
- Released: 1987
- Recorded: Autumn 1985 – Spring 1986
- Studio: Bughouse and Dys Studios (Fort Collins, Colorado)
- Genre: Experimental music, electroacoustic music, musique concrète
- Length: 47:20
- Label: Recommended
- Producer: Tom Katsimpalis, Mark Piersel, Steve Scholbe, William Sharp, Gordon H. Whitlow, Larry Wilson

Biota chronology
Rackabones (1985)	Bellowing Room (1987)	Tinct (1988)

Bellowing Room is the seventh studio album by experimental electronic music ensemble Biota, released in 1987 by Recommended Records.

== Track listing ==
All music is composed by Tom Katsimpalis, Mark Piersel, Steve Scholbe, William Sharp, Gordon H. Whitlow, and Larry Wilson.

Side one
No.	Title	Length
1.	"A"	23:30

Side two
No.	Title	Length
1.	"B"	23:50

== Personnel ==
Adapted from the Bellowing Room liner notes.

Biota

- Tom Katsimpalis – instruments, illustrations, production, mixing
- Mark Piersel – instruments, production, engineering, mixing
- Steve Scholbe – instruments, production, mixing
- William Sharp – instruments, production, engineering, mixing
- Gordon H. Whitlow – instruments, production, mixing
- Larry Wilson – instruments, production, mixing

Production and additional personnel

- Ti Birchrose – illustrations
- Heidi Eversley – illustrations
- Jean Michel Papillon – illustrations
- Dana Sharp – illustrations
- Mareye Yeates – illustrations

== Release history ==
Region	Date	Label	Format	Catalog
United States	1987	Recommended	LP	RR C27
