= Awry =

EP by Biota
- Released: 1988
- Recorded: Autumn 1987 – 1988
- Studio: Dys Studios (Fort Collins, CO)
- Genre: Experimental music
- Label: Bad Alchemy

Biota chronology
Tinct (1988)	Awry (1988)	Tumble (1989)

Awry is a 10" vinyl EP by the American experimental electronic music ensemble Biota, released in 1988 by Bad Alchemy.

== Track listing ==
All music is composed by Tom Katsimpalis, Mark Piersel, Steve Scholbe, William Sharp, Gordon H. Whitlow, Larry Wilson, and Randy Yeates.

Side one
No.	Title	Length
1.	"Sfumato"
2.	"Rail"
3.	"Moom"
4.	"Away"

Side two
No.	Title	Length
1.	"Tinge"
2.	"Hums"
3.	"Reveal"
4.	"Repairs"
5.	"Watch"

== Personnel ==
Adapted from the Awry liner notes.

Biota

- Tom Katsimpalis – organ, guitar, bass guitar, banjo, harmonica, tape, percussion
- Mark Piersel – trumpet, guitar, bass guitar, psaltery, electronics, bells, percussion, engineering
- Steve Scholbe – alto saxophone, bass clarinet, flute, guitar, bells, percussion
- William Sharp – tape, electronics, soprano clarinet, engineering
- Gordon H. Whitlow – bass guitar, guitar, piano, organ, accordion, percussion
- Larry Wilson – drums, bongos
- Randy Yeates – mbira, concertina

Additional musicians

- C.W. Vrtacek – piano (B5)

Production and additional personnel

- Bill Tindall – engineering

== Release history ==
Region	Date	Label	Format	Catalog
United States	1988	Bad Alchemy	LP	BAAL 333
