= Gyromancy (album) =

Studio album by Mnemonists
- Released: 1984
- Recorded: Summer 1983
- Studio: Pendragon (Fort Collins, CO)
- Genre: Drone, ambient
- Length: 38:51
- Label: Dys
- Producer: Mnemonists

Biota chronology
Biota (1982)	Gyromancy (1984)	Rackabones (1985)

Professional ratings
Review scores
Source	Rating
Allmusic	4/5 stars

Gyromancy is the fifth studio album by the free improvisation ensemble Mnemonist Orchestra, released in 1984 by Dys Records.

== Track listing ==
All music is composed by Mnemonists.

Side one
No.	Title	Length
1.	"A"	19:48

Side two
No.	Title	Length
1.	"B"	19:03

CD issue bonus tracks
No.	Title	Length
3.	"Nailed"	4:21
4.	"Tic"	4:15

== Personnel ==
Adapted from the Horde liner notes.

Mnemonists

- Amy Derbyshire – instruments
- Mark Derbyshire – instruments, engineering
- Karen Nakai – instruments
- Mark Piersel – instruments
- Steve Scholbe – instruments
- William Sharp – instruments

Production and additional personnel

- Thomas Beckwith – photography
- Richard Donaldson – mastering

== Release history ==
Region	Date	Label	Format	Catalog
United States	1984	Dys	LP	DYS 10
United Kingdom	2004	ReR Megacorp	CD	RéR MN2
