= Almost Never =

Almost Never may refer to:

- Almost Never (album), a 1992 album by Biota
- Almost Never (TV series), a British musical dramedy series
- Almost never, a term of probability theory
