= Days of Grace =

Days of Grace may refer to:

- Days of Grace (album), compilation album by C.W. Vrtacek
- Days of Grace, album by Greg Long
- Days of Grace (film), 2011 Mexican film
- Days of Grace (book), 1993 autobiography by tennis player Arthur Ashe

== See also ==
- Grace period
