= Biocoenosis =

Interacting organisms living together in a habitat

A freshwater aquatic and terrestrial food web

A biocenosis (UK English, biocoenosis, also biocenose, biocoenose, biotic community, biological community, ecological community, life assemblage), coined by Karl Möbius in 1877, describes the interacting organisms living together in a habitat (biotope). The use of this term has declined in the 21st сentury.

In the palaeontological literature, the term distinguishes "life assemblages", which reflect the original living community, living together at one place and time. In other words, it is an assemblage of fossils or a community of specific time, which is different from "death assemblages" (thanatocoenoses). No palaeontological assemblage will ever completely represent the original biological community (i.e. the biocoenosis, in the sense used by an ecologist); the term thus has somewhat different meanings in a palaeontological and an ecological context.

Based on the concept of biocenosis, ecological communities can take various forms:

- Zoocenosis for the faunal community,
- Phytocenosis for the flora community,
- Microbiocenosis for the microbial community.

The geographical extent of a biocoenosis is limited by the requirement of a more or less uniform species composition.

== Ecosystems ==
An ecosystem, originally defined by Tansley (1935), is a biotic community (or biocenosis) along with its physical environment (or biotope). In ecological studies, biocenosis is the emphasis on relationships between species in an area. These relationships are an additional consideration to the interaction of each species with the physical environment.

== Biotic communities ==
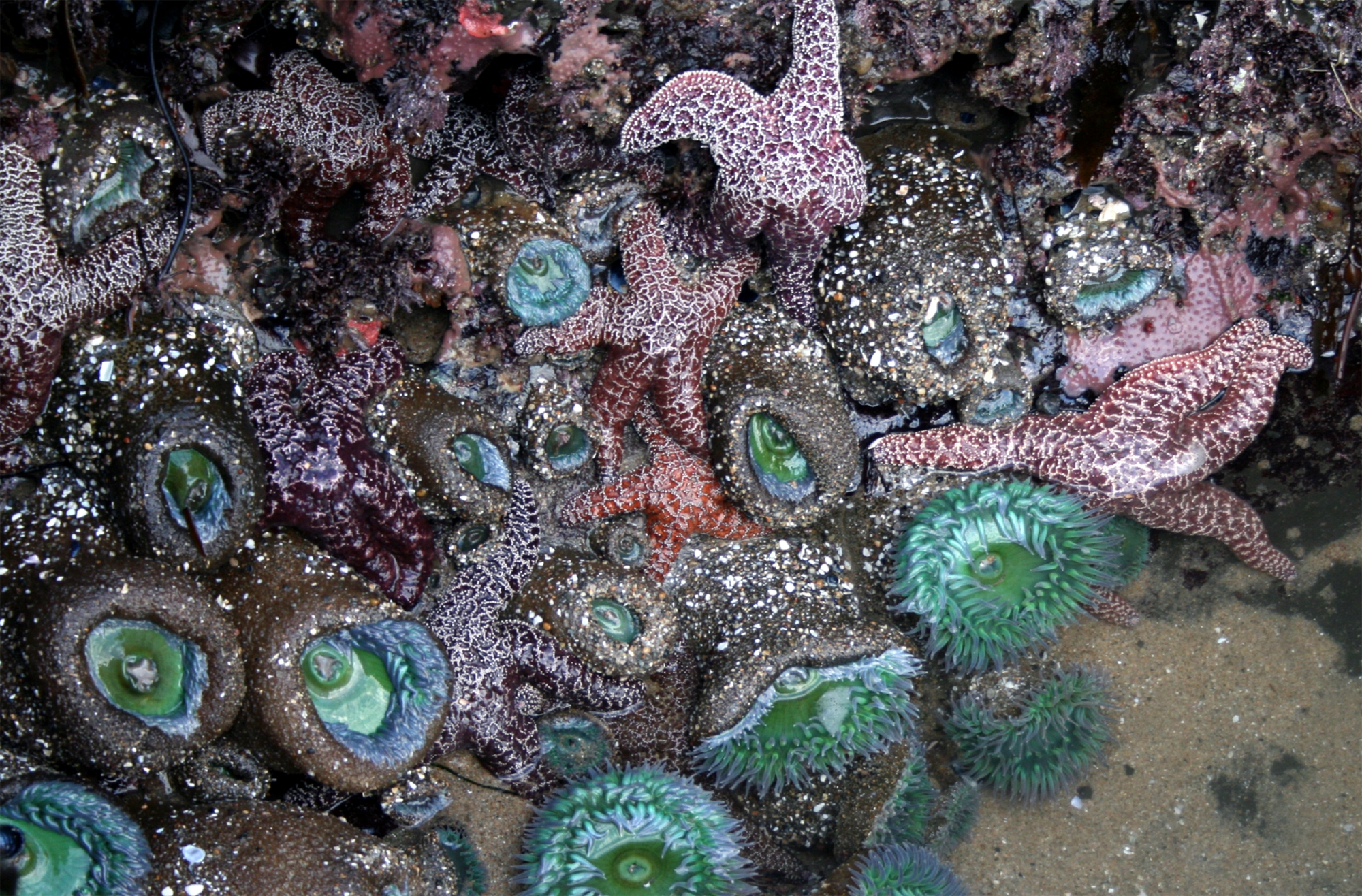
The side of a tide pool showing sea stars (Dermasterias), sea anemones (Anthopleura) and sea sponges in Santa Cruz, California

Biotic communities vary in size, and larger ones may contain smaller ones. Species interactions are evident in food or feeding relationships. A method of delineating biotic communities is to map the food network to identify which species feed upon which others and then determine the system boundary as the one that can be drawn through the fewest consumption links relative to the number of species within the boundary.

Mapping biotic communities is important identifying sites needing environmental protection, such as the British Site of Special Scientific Interest (SSSIs). The Australian Department of the Environment and Heritage maintains a register of Threatened Species and Threatened Ecological Communities under the Environment Protection and Biodiversity Conservation Act 1999 (EPBC Act).

== See also ==
- Biosphere
- Biota
- Community (ecology)
- Hylozoism
- Population biology
