= Light Coorporation =

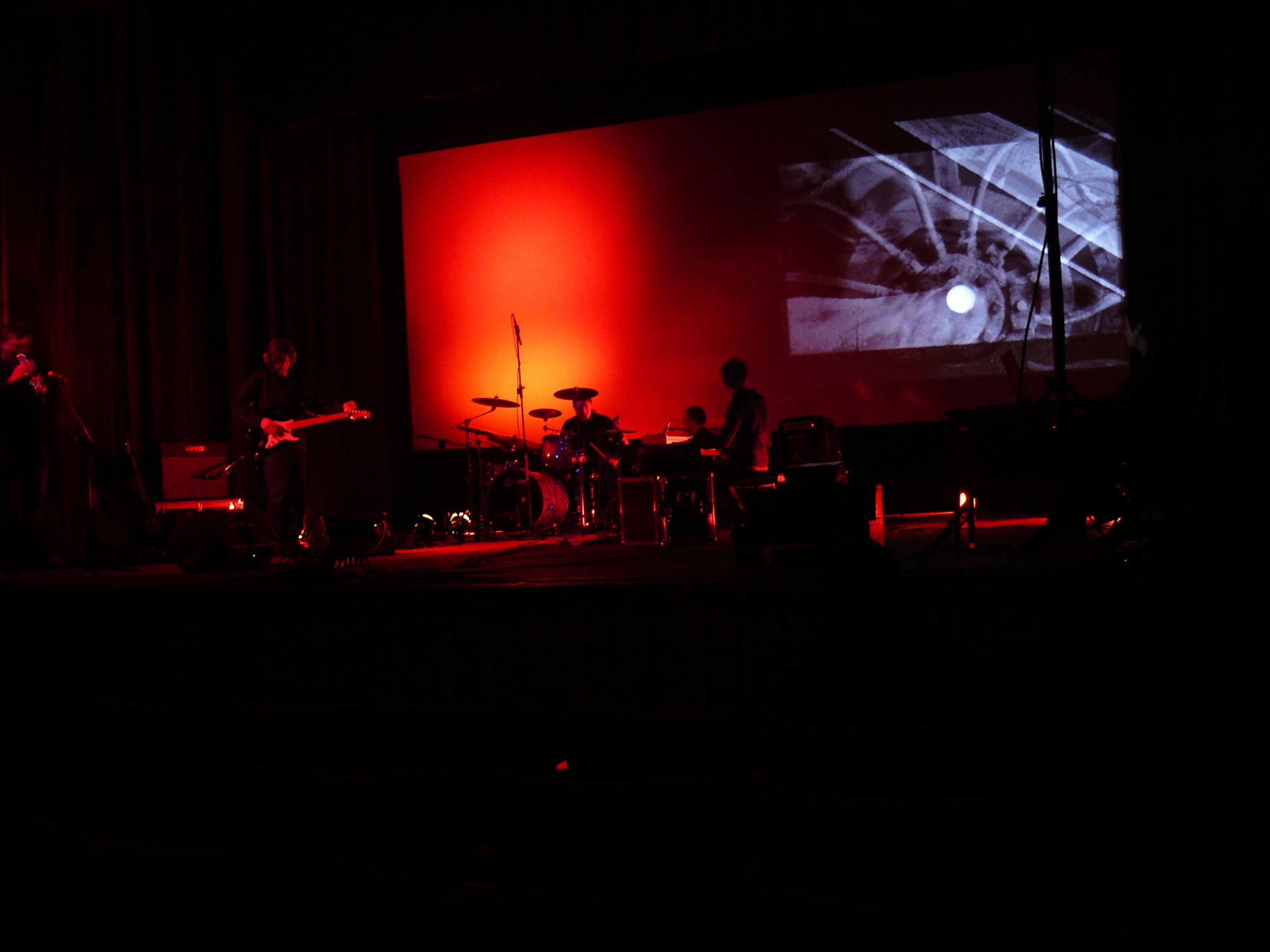
- Light Coorporation in 2008

Background information
- Origin: UK
- Genres: jazz-rock, avant-garde rock, progressive rock, psychedelic rock
- Years active: 2007–present
- Label: Recommended Records
- Website: www.lightcoorporation.com

Light Coorporation are an avant-garde and progressive rock band formed in 2007. Their influences include jazz, fusion and psychedelic rock. The band's music also draws heavily from the legacy of the Canterbury scene artists and the Rock in Opposition movement.

== History ==
=== Band formation and the first recordings (2007–2010) ===
Light Coorporation was formed in 2007 by Mariusz Sobański (Sobanski Music Laboratory), a composer and record producer, who specializes in progressive rock, jazz-rock and avant-garde music. That same year, the band independently produced a studio EP called Back Up Session (2007) in preparation for their upcoming concerts in the UK. The design was done by Tom Lietzau, who continued to cooperate with the band over the next couple of years. The next year saw the release of the first audiovisual publication by Light Coorporation, Beyond a Shadow of a Doubt (2008). It contained concert multimedia and special features like videotape recordings prepared and set to the band's music.

=== Rare Dialect (2011) ===
On 10 August 2011 the band presented its debut album, Rare Dialect, to the accolades of music critics in across the world. Apart from Sobański, musicians featured on the recording were Robert Bielak (violin), Miłosz Krauz (drums), Michał Pijewski (tenor saxophone), Tomasz Struk (fretless bass) and Marcin Szczęsny (synthesizer, Rhodes piano).

Rare Dialect was released by the prestigious London label RēR Megacorp, that is Recommended Records founded by Chris Cutler (other artists taken on by RēR include Henry Cow, Cassiber, Pere Ubu, The Residents and others). Light Coorporation approached the label through Henryk Palczewski, owner of an independent Polish distribution and production company "ARS"2. The cooperation with Recommended Records was a big success for the group. Up till then, the only Polish music group who had recorded an album for Cutler's label was a band called Reportaż, back in the 80s.

Rare Dialect was recorded at Szymon Swoboda's Vintage Records studio. The band used analog preamplifiers, compressors, amplifiers, and a Studer A807 tape recorder that used to belong to Polskie Radio (Polish Radio). The musicians wanted to achieve the feeling of LPs from the 1960s and 1970s; they wanted the recording to sound authentic and natural. Because of that, they decided not to edit out various little noises, hums, and rattles that occurred unexpectedly during the sessions. This meticulous care for the best possible sound quality would also mark their future albums. The band would continue with their tradition of using older recording equipment, as well.

=== Aliens from Planet Earth (2012) ===
On 20 June 2012, roughly a year after releasing Rare Dialect, Light Coorporation presented their second studio album, Aliens from Planet Earth, also released by Recommended Records. Musicians featured on the album were Mariusz Sobański (electric guitar, baritone cello), Robert Bielak (violin), Miłosz Krauz (drums, percussion instruments), Paweł Rogoża (tenor sax, kaossilator pro, which allows for real-time reworking of instrument sounds), and Krzysztof Waśkiewicz (bass guitar, reel-to-reel tape recorder). Music on the album was recorded in concert held at the Konin water tower (CKiS Gallery "Wieża Ciśnień" (Water Tower) in Konin). The unique venue enabled for the clarity and the open space feel that mark the album pieces. The music itself became more leisurely and improvisational; it eased on its concrete framework and acquired a more picturesque, psychedelic feeling in comparison to the debut album.

The same year, the band released their second audiovisual publication in the DVD format, also under the title Aliens from Planet Earth. Just like Beyond a Shadow of a Doubt, the DVD showed that Light Coorporation concerts merge music with film projection. Works presented during their concerts remain in the convention of the independent cinema, stylistically approaching video art; they sometimes mimic black-and-white documentaries. In concert, the visual materials are mixed live; they include fragments of films, vintage videotapes and photographs, all mirroring the contemporary world. In effect, the visual element enters into dialogue with the music. By using the visual as well as auditory stimuli, and building the atmosphere by guitar riffs and silence, the band encourages listeners to arrive at their own, individual interpretation of the entire performance.

=== about (2013) ===
The third studio album by Light Coorporation, entitled about, was released on 30 May 2013. Just as in the case of the two previous albums, its label was once again Recommended Records. This time, as many as twelve artists took part in the recording, which allowed for a greater sound diversification. The band kept the musicians who appeared in the two previous albums, using Mariusz Sobański (guitars, Rhodes piano), Szczęsny (synthesizer, Rhodes piano), Struk (bass), Rogoża (tenor sax), Pijewski (tenor sax), Krauz (drums) and Bielak (violin); apart from them, the musicians in the studio were Kuba Jankowiak (trumpet), Barbara Kucharska (flute), Piotr Oses (double bass), and Daniel Pabierowski (tenor sax). The pieces composed by Sobański were once again written in the spirit of vintage, and the album returned to the concreteness and conciseness of the debut. Just like the debut album, about received positive reviews around the world.

=== Chapter IV Before the Murmur of Silence (2014) ===
On 6 October 2014 Light Coorporation announced that their fourth album will be called Chapter IV - Before the Murmur of Silence. The same year, on 4 December, the album was released (like the three previous ones) by RēR Megacorp. Instrumentalists who created the music were: Sobański (guitars, baritone cello), Rogoża (tenor sax), Jankowiak (trumpet), Oses (double bass), Waśkiewicz (bass), Krauz (drums) and Witold Oleszak (piano).

=== Light Coorporation: 64:38 Radio Full Liv(F)E (2016) ===
On 6 October 2016 Light Coorporation announced that their fifth album will be called 64:38 Radio Full Liv(f)e ..again for Chris Cutler's label RéR Recommended Records London. On 27 April 2013, a world-renowned jazzman and a film score composer Krzysztof Trzciński-Komeda would have been 82. This commemoration has served as an excuse to christen the studio of Radio Merkury Poznań, Poland, where years ago the Krzysztof Komeda Sextet had their first rehearsals and recordings. It is worth mentioning that it was indeed Komeda who was hugely influential in shaping the international jazz scene, and particularly the 70s avantgarde jazz.

== Musicians ==
Rare Dialect:

- Mariusz Sobański – guitars
- Robert Bielak – violin
- Michał Pijewski – tenor saxophone
- Marcin Szczęsny – synthesizers, Fender Rhodes
- Tomasz Struk – fretless bass
- Miłosz Krauz – drums

Aliens from Planet Earth:

- Mariusz Sobański - guitars, cello
- Paweł Rogoża – tenor saxophone
- Robert Bielak – violin
- Krzysztof Waśkiewicz – bass guitar
- Miłosz Krauz – drums

about:

- Mariusz Sobański – guitars, Fender Rhodes
- Paweł Rogoża – tenor saxophone
- Robert Bielak – violin
- Michał Pijewski – tenor saxophone
- Daniel Pabierowski – tenor saxophone
- Jakub Jankowiak – trumpet
- Barbara Kucharska – flute
- Marcin Szczęsny – synthesizers, Fender Rhodes
- Piotr Oses – double bass
- Tomasz Struk – fretless bass
- Miłosz Krauz - drums

Chapter IV – Before the Murmur of Silence:

- Mariusz Sobański - guitars, cello
- Paweł Rogoża – tenor saxophone
- Kuba Jankowiak - trumpet
- Witold Oleszak – piano
- Piotr Oses – double bass
- Krzysztof Waśkiewicz – bass guitar
- Miłosz Krauz - drums, percussion

== Discography ==
Studio albums

- Rare Dialect (Recommended Records 2011)
- Aliens from Planet Earth (Recommended Records 2012)
- about (Recommended Records 2013)
- Chapter IV - Before the Murmur of Silence (Recommended Records 2014)
- 64:38 Radio Full Liv(F)E (Recommended Records 2016)

Extended plays

- Back Up Session (European Improvisation Scene 2007)

== Videography ==
Video albums

- Beyond a Shadow of a Doubt
- Aliens from Planet Earth DVD

== Music videos ==
Year	Title	Production
2007	"Warm Red (Test of Personality)"	Blurfilm
2011	"Tokyo Streets Symphony"	szpulka.com
2012	"Time (Everything is Chasing After the Wind)"	szpulka.com
2012	"World of Cobweb Fabric"	szpulka.com
2013	"about"	Jacek Jabłoński
2014	"Three Headed Monster Sight Unsee"	Poznańska Inicjatywa Filmowa
2014	"Basements of Heaven"	Poznańska Inicjatywa Filmowa
2014	"Sealing Wind into Bottles"	Poznańska Inicjatywa Filmowa
