= $100 Guitar Project =

2013 album by various artists

The $100 Guitar Project was started on October 20, 2010, when Nick Didkovsky and Chuck O'Meara bought a $100 electric guitar from Elderly Instruments. In 2 years and 30,000 miles of travel throughout the US and Europe, the guitar passed through the hands of over 65 players, each of whom recorded a piece with it, signed it and then passed it on to the next player. The result was a 2-CD album released on Bridge Records, Inc. in January 2013 (BRIDGE 9381A/B). 50% (about $14.75) of the album proceeds go to CARE, an organization fighting global poverty.

The guitar has been identified as a FujiGen Gakki EJ-2 (with a missing neck pickup). These guitars were made in Japan from 1962 to 1965. The time limit ranged from a few seconds to three minutes.

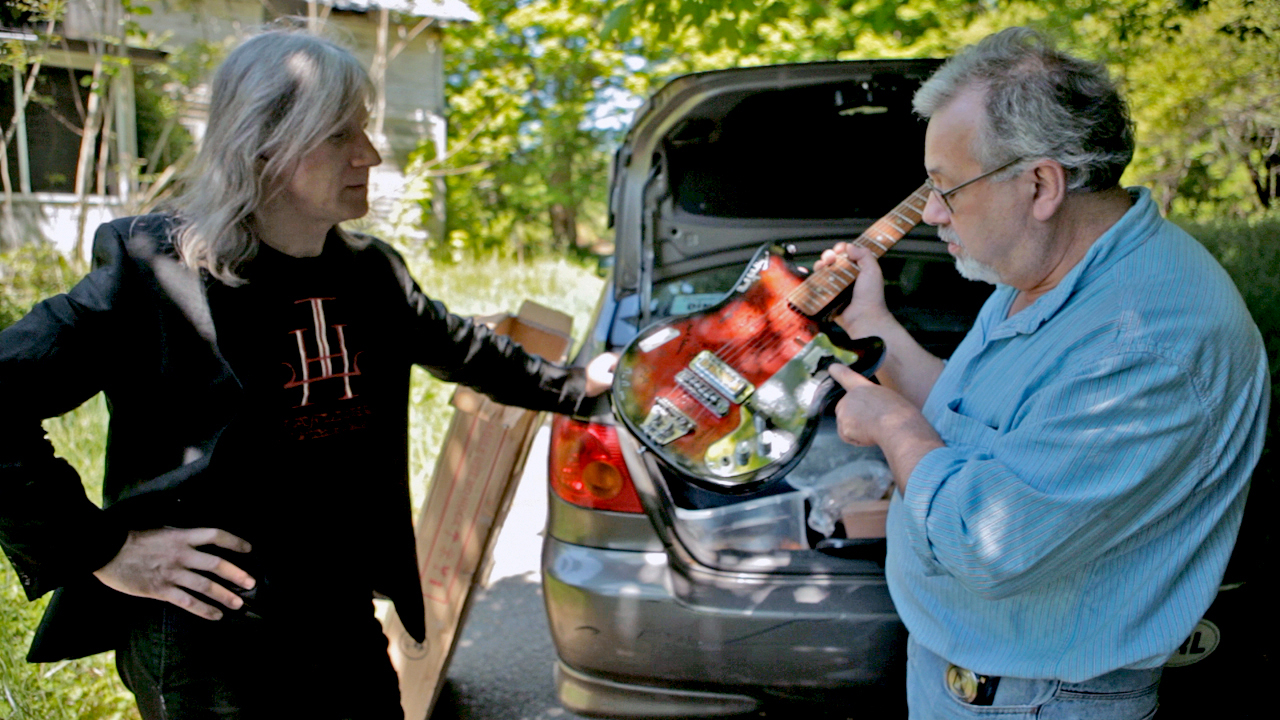
Nick Didkovsky & Chuck O'Meara, founders of the $100 Guitar Project

== Guitarists ==
Alex Skolnick, David Starobin, Elliott Sharp, Mike Keneally, Barry Cleveland, Fred Frith, Henry Kaiser, Mark Hitt, Keith Rowe, Nels Cline, Andy Aledort, Hillary Fielding, John Shiurba, Karl Evangelista, Phil Burk, Ray Kallas, Janet Feder, Thomas Dimuzio, Julia Miller, Chris Murphy, Chuck O'Meara, Marty Carlson, Shawn Persinger, Kai Niggemann, Steve MacLean, Ken Field, Roger Miller, Michael Bierylo, Bill Brovold, Larry Polansky, Biota Bill Sharp, Ava Mendoza, Amy Denio, Bruce Eisenbeil, Caroline Feldmeier, Colin Marston, David Linaburg, Hans Tammen, James Moore, Jesse Krakow, Jesse Kranzler, Joe Bouchard, Jon Diaz, Josh Lopes, Kobe Van Cauwenberghe, Marco Cappelli, Marco Oppedisano, Joe Berger, Mark Solomon, Mark Stewart, Mike Lerner, Nick Didkovsky, Rhys Chatham, Ron Anderson, Taylor Levine, Tom Marsan, Greg Anderson, Han-earl Park, Del Rey, Teisco Del Rey, Matt Wilson, Bruce Zeines, Toon Callier/Zwerm, Juan Parra Cancino, and Wiek Hijmans.
