= Reed Ghazala =

American musician

- Born: Qubais Reed Ghazala; Cincinnati, Ohio, U.S.
- Occupations: Author; photographer; musician; composer; instrument builder
- Years active: 1960s–present

Qubais Reed Ghazala is an American author, photographer, musician, composer, and experimental instrument builder. He was described by Motherboard as the "father of circuit bending".

Ghazala, who is from Cincinnati, Ohio, has built experimental instruments and/or consulted for many prominent musicians including Tom Waits, Peter Gabriel, King Crimson, and the Rolling Stones. Ghazala's work has been covered globally in the press including the New York Times's declaration of circuit-bending as part of the fine arts movement.

Ghazala's work is held in various galleries internationally including the permanent collections of New York City's Museum of Modern Art, the Guggenheim and the Whitney Museum of American Art as part of the Fusion Arts compendium.

Ghazala's influence upon creative electronic design is global, having originated the planet's first "grassroots electronic art movement" (while Ghazala has noted that he was not the lone, or first, experimenter in the field, it should be recognized that his contemporaries' work, regardless of date, did not spawn an international and specific art movement replete with original terminology, processes and an ever-increasing fellowship).

Ghazala's practice with chance art (the root of circuit-bending) also involves studies in dye migration materials and Japanese suminagashi, as well as liquid, gel and smoke chambers, mobiles and pyrotechnics.

== History ==
Ghazala accidentally discovered the technique of circuit bending in the 1960s when a toy amplifier in his desk drawer began to make "very strange oscillating sweeping sounds". The amplifier's casing had been opened, exposing its inner circuitry and allowing it to short circuit against another metal object. Ghazala's work in the field progressed with the introduction of the Speak & Spell toy in 1978.

Ghazala has built many instruments during his career, mostly consisting of electronic toys modified with the circuit bending technique and customized until they barely resemble the original product. He has produced numerous audio compositions with these instruments which have been featured on many albums. He has also written a series of works relating to and teaching the circuit bending process, including his book, published by Wiley & Sons, titled Circuit-Bending: Build Your Own Alien Instruments.

Ghazala coined the term "immediate canvas" in his work with circuit bending, which is the concept that through circuit bending the hurdles of electronic design are avoided. Anyone can step up to an open circuit and create, without needing to know electronic theory or daunting equations. Another term coined by Ghazala is BEAsape which means BioElectronicAudiosapien. When body contacts are used, the body of the performer is used as a variable resistor – there is a fusion between man and machine into one purpose which Ghazala says is something new zoologically and musically.

== Bibliography ==
- Circuit-Bending : Build Your Own Alien Instruments. Wiley. 2005. ISBN 978-0-7645-8887-7.

== Discography ==
- A Watch in the Sea, Sound Theater (Cassette) 1982
- Sound Theater One: Music and Event, Sound Theater (Cassette) 1982
- Mind Over Matter, Sound Theater (Cassette) 1983
- Sound Theater Two: Visions, Sound Theater (Cassette) 1983
- Bring Your Room, Sound Theater (Cassette) 1985
- The Dreams that Insects Dream, Sound Theater (Cassette) 1985
- Requiem for a Radio, Sound Theater (Cassette) 1985
- The Sound Theater Radio Special Sound Theater (Cassette) 1985
- Suite for a Radio and Turntable: Outdoor Operations, Sound Theater (Cassette) 1985
- Posters in the Underground, Sound Theater and Sound of Pig (Cassette) 1986
- Vinegar versus Cats, Sound Theater (Cassette) 1986
- Go Mad Xmas, Sound Theater (Cassette) 1987
- Natural Science, Sound Theater (Cassette) 1987
- Spzz Tapes, Sound Theater (Cassette) 1987
- Artifacts, Sound Theater (Cassette) 1988
- Behind the Emotional Mask, Sound Theater (Cassette) 1989
- Cassette Mythos: Feast of Hearing, CM (Cassette) 1989
- Schematic, Pointless Music (cassette) 199?
- Three Rings on the Ground, Pointless Music (Cassette) 199?
- Clones and Friends, EJAZ (Cassette) 199?
- Assemblage 1990, Realization Records (Cassette) 1990
- Anti White Bastards, PBK-USA (Cassette) 1991
- Cassette Mythos: Audio Alchemy, What's Next? Records (Cassette, CD) 1991
- Electricity, Pointless Music (Cassette) 1992
- From the pages of EMI, No. 7, Experimental Musical Instruments (Cassette) 1992
- 4 X 4, Ladd/Frith (CD) 1993
- Burning Suns of Shadow Worlds, Ladd/Frith (Cassette) 1993
- Drum, Spilling Audio (Cassette) 1993
- Gawk: Lore of the Ox Owl, Sacrifice (Cassette) 1993
- A Darker Solvent/EnTerres, Edicion, Spain (LP) 1993
- Postal Sound Surgery, Pointless Music (Cassette) 1993
- There is a Secret Garden, Sound Theater (Cassette) 1993
- From the pages of EMI, No. 8, Experimental Musical Instruments (Cassette) 1993
- Blacklight Braille: Sleep Not Yet, Vetco (CD) 1994
- Gawk: Marc Sloan, Reed Ghazala, Askance (Cassette) 1994
- No Dub, Spilling Audio (Cassette) 1994
- Objekt 5.5, Ladd/Frith (Cassette) 1994
- Objekt 5, Ladd/Frith (CD) 1994
- Objekt 666 (double cassette), Ladd/Frith (Cassette) 1994
- Redrum, Spilling Audio (Cassette) 1994
- Smells like 7, Spilling Audio (Cassette) 1994
- State of the Union, MR (CD) 1994
- The Little Fiddles in the Grass, Epitapes (Cassette) 1994
- From the pages of EMI, No. 9, Experimental Musical Instruments (Cassette) 1994
- Blacklight Braille: Songs for the Longhaired Son, Vetco (CD) 1995
- Better Things are Electric. M&M 1995
- Gawk-Gawd, Askance (CD) 1995
- Requiem for a Radio, Realization Records (CD) 1995
- Threnody to the New Victims of Hiroshima. Realization Records (CD) 1995
- From the pages of EMI, No. 10, Experimental Musical Instruments (Cassette) 199?
- Gravikords Whirlies and Pyrophones, Ellipsis Arts (CD/Book) 1996
- Blacklight Braille: Songs from Moonlight Snow (CD) 1996
- State of the Union, Atavistic (CD) 1996
- From the pages of EMI, No.11, Experimental Musical Instruments (Cassette) 1996
- Blacklight Braille: Into the world of the Gods, Vetco (CD) 1997
- The ReR Quarterly; v.4 #2; ReR (CD) 1997
- From the pages of EMI, No. 12, Experimental Musical Instruments (Cassette) 1997
- Blacklight Braille: Black Moon Selection, Vetco (CD) 1998
- Mad Art River; Askance (CD) 1998
- HOPE; Audio Research Editions (CD) 1998
- Blacklight Braille: Dietles Tavern; Vetco; (CD) 1999.
- Blacklight Braille: Sailing Away; Razzle 1999
- Blacklight Braille: Old Bones and Sacred Stones; Razzle; (CD) 1999
- Blacklight Braille; The castle of the Northern Crown; Razzle; (CD) 1999
