= Mike Hovancsek =

American musician

Mike Hovancsek (born c. 1967) is an American multi-instrumentalist, visual artist, and writer. He collaborated with Egyptian composer Halim El-Dabh since the late 1980s (performing and recording with him, and restoring his early electronic music), and is a former member of the multicultural experimental group, Pointless Orchestra. He plays the guzheng, koto, guitar, waterphone, and percussion, among other instruments.

In the late 1980s he founded the Pointless Music label, which was devoted to experimental music releases. In his solo work, and with Pointless Orchestra, he recorded and/or performed with such musicians as Jin Hi Kim, Z'EV, Amy Denio, Anna Homler, Illusion of Safety, Reed Ghazala, John Hajeski, and Barry Chabala.

Mike Hovancsek's current output, which he describes as "multicultural chamber music," includes solo recordings, solo performances, and collaborations with many notable members of the world music community. His music often combines instruments from several different cultures in unique ways. For example, on "Hybrids" (from his Temporal Angels CD) he combines the Chinese guzheng, cello, violin, and Middle Eastern dumbek. On "Somniloquy" (also from Temporal Angels) he combines koto, english horn, and choir. Reviewer Anastasia Pantsios of Cleveland Scene describes his work as "elegant, textured music that sounds spare and understated yet is quite complex."

Mike Hovancsek is a graduate of Kent State University, where he majored in psychology and later earned a master's degree in counseling. While there he studied Chinese music with Chia-chun Chu and Japanese koto with Anne Prescott.

== Discography ==
=== As leader ===
- 2003 - Temporal Angels (SRCA)
- 2010 - Turbulent Calm (Infinite Number of Sounds)
- 2011 - Ascend (Infinite Number of Sounds)
- 2015 - Samadhi (Bandcamp)
- 2015 - Outlier Protocols (Bandcamp)
- 2016 - Gayatri (Bandcamp)

=== With Pointless Orchestra ===
- 1994 Endless 1 (Manifold)
- 1997 - Lives: A Pointless Night Out (Without Fear)
- 1998 - Approaching Totality (Without Fear)
- 1999 - Enhanced Gravity (CD-ROM, Yucca Tree Records)

=== With Halim El-Dabh ===
- 1991 - Xango Ka O (cassette, Pointless Music)

=== With John M. Bennett ===
- Autophagia (Luna Bisonte)

=== Compilations ===
- 1991 - A Pointless Compilation (Pointless Music)
- 1991 - (Y)earbook, v. 2 (Rastascan Records)
- 1992 - Postal Sound Surgery (cassette, Pointless Music/audiofile Tapes)
- 1993 - Magnetic Conversations (cassette, Pointless Music)
- 1993 - Point of Yucca, v. 1 (Yucca Tree Records/Pointless Music)
- c. 1994 - The Avant World Jazz Noise Project: An Experimental Music Compilation (cassette, Pointless Music)
- c. 1994 - Electricity: An Electronic Music Compilation (cassette, Pointless Music)
- 1994 - Spheral Tone Theory (cassette, Pointless Music)
- 1997 - RēR Quarterly, v. 4, no. 2 (Recommended Records RēR 0402)
- 2002 - Paradoxes of Enlargement (CD accompanying Bananafish 16)

=== As engineer ===
- 1992 - Halim El-Dabh: Crossing Into the Electric Magnetic (cassette, Pointless Music)
- 2000 - Halim El-Dabh: Crossing Into the Electric Magnetic (Without Fear)

== Articles about music, written by Mike Hovancsek ==
Swords into Plowshares
