= Some Attributes of a Living System =

Studio album by Mnemonists
- Released: 1980
- Recorded: October 1979 – February 1980
- Studio: Pendragon (Fort Collins, CO)
- Genre: Free improvisation, drone
- Length: 43:07
- Label: Dys
- Producer: William Sharp

Biota chronology
Mnemonist Orchestra (1979)	Some Attributes of a Living System (1980)	Horde (1981)

Some Attributes of a Living System is the second studio album by the free improvisation ensemble Mnemonist Orchestra, released in 1980 by Dys Records.

== Track listing ==
Side one
No.	Title	Length
1.	"Fragment 1"
2.	"Fragment 2"
3.	"Fragment 3"
4.	"Fragment 4"
5.	"Fragment 5"
6.	"Fragment 6"
7.	"Fragment 7"
8.	"Fragment 8"
9.	"Fragment 9"
10.	"Fragment 10"
11.	"Fragment 11"
12.	"Fragment 12"
13.	"Fragment 13"

Side two
No.	Title	Length
1.	"Fragment 14"
2.	"Fragment 15"
3.	"Fragment 16"
4.	"Fragment 17"
5.	"Fragment 18"
6.	"Fragment 19"
7.	"Fragment 20"
8.	"Fragment 21"
9.	"Fragment 22"

== Personnel ==
Adapted from the Some Attributes of a Living System liner notes.

Mnemonists

- Mark Derbyshire – tape, electronics, engineering
- John Herdt – electric guitar, spoken word
- Torger Hougen – spoken word, percussion
- Hugh Ragin – trumpet, trombone, piccolo, percussion
- Steve Scholbe – alto saxophone, electric guitar, percussion, spoken word, arrangements (A10)
- William Sharp – piano, tape, electronics, percussion, spoken word, production, arrangements (A1, A2, A4, A5, A7, A10, A12, A13, B2, B3, B5–B9)
- Sara Thompson – double bass
- Randy Yeates – spoken word, percussion

Additional musicians

- Steve Bennett – acoustic guitar and electric guitar (A10, A13, B5)
- Renais Goddard – spoken word (B8)
- Kent Hotchkiss – spoken word (A2)
- Ruth Hougen – harp (B7)
- Melissa Katsimpalis – spoken word (A9, B8)
- Tom Katsimpalis – percussion, acoustic guitar (A1), spoken word (A9)
- Ken Lark – percussion, spoken word, drums (A4, A5)
- Mark Schulz – bass guitar (A4, A5, B7)

== Release history ==
Region	Date	Label	Format	Catalog
United States	1980	Dys	LP	DYS 02
