= When Heaven Comes to Town =

Studio album by C.W. Vrtacek
- Released: 1988
- Recorded: 1988 at Vrtacek's household
- Genre: Electronic
- Length: 42:52
- Label: RēR
- Producer: C.W. Vrtacek

C.W. Vrtacek chronology
Learning to Be Silent (1986)	When Heaven Comes to Town (1988)	Days of Grace (1992)

Professional ratings
Review scores
Source	Rating
Allmusic	3/5 stars

When Heaven Comes to Town is the fourth album by composer C.W. Vrtacek, released in 1988 through RēR Megacorp. Despite never being individually issued on CD, the album can be found in its entirety on the anthology Silent Heaven.

== Track listing ==
All music is composed by C.W. Vrtacek.

Side one
No.	Title	Length
1.	"Minus My Friend"	1:33
2.	"History of the Heart, Mystery of the Mind"	1:35
3.	"Part of Me Here, Part of Me With You, Always"	1:20
4.	"Stone Steps"	1:17
5.	"Preparing the Bridge (For Heaven)"	5:09
6.	"Saying Goodbye to the Beauty and Complexity of Life on Earth"	5:42

Side two
No.	Title	Length
1.	"When Heaven Comes to Town"	26:16

== Personnel ==
- Myles Davis – mixing
- Michael Gellatly – illustrations, design
- Maria Meleschnig – photography
- C.W. Vrtacek – Ensoniq Mirage, ukulele, tape, piano, production, engineering, mixing
- Tim Young – mastering
