= Rackabones =

Studio album by Biota
- Released: 1985
- Recorded: Spring 1984 – Winter 1985
- Studio: Pendragon (Fort Collins, CO)
- Genre: Free improvisation
- Length: 88:44
- Label: Dys
- Producer: Carol Heineman, Tom Katsimpalis, Mark Piersel, Steve Scholbe, William Sharp, Randy Yeates

Biota chronology
Gyromancy (1984)	Rackabones (1985)	Bellowing Room (1987)

Rackabones is the sixth studio album by the free improvisation ensemble Biota, released in 1985 by Dys Records. The album marked the official beginning of Biota as an ensemble separate from the Mnemonists name. (The name Mnemonists has continued to be retained for the group's visual output.)

== Track listing ==
All music is composed by Carol Heineman, Tom Katsimpalis, Mark Piersel, Steve Scholbe, William Sharp and Randy Yeates.

Side one
No.	Title	Length
1.	"Vagabones A"	26:31

Side two
No.	Title	Length
1.	"Vagabones B"	26:26

Side three
No.	Title	Length
1.	"Rackabones A"	18:01

Side four
No.	Title	Length
1.	"Rackabones B"	17:46

== Personnel ==
Adapted from the Rackabones liner notes.

Biota

- Carol Heineman – instruments, production
- Tom Katsimpalis – instruments, production, illustrations
- Mark Piersel – instruments, production, mixing
- Steve Scholbe – instruments, production, mixing
- William Sharp – instruments, production, mixing
- Randy Yeates – instruments, production

Production and additional personnel

- George Harms – photography
- Carol Heineman – design
- Tom Katsimpalis – illustrations
- Bruce Leek – engineering

== Release history ==
Region	Date	Label	Format	Catalog
United States	1985	Dys	LP	DYS 12&13
