= Learning to Be Silent =

Studio album by C. W. Vrtacek
- Released: 1986
- Recorded: August 1985 – January 1986 at Vrtacek's household
- Genre: Electronic
- Length: 36:48
- Label: Cordelia
- Producer: C. W. Vrtacek

C. W. Vrtacek chronology
Days and Days (1982)	Learning to Be Silent (1986)	When Heaven Comes to Town (1988)

Professional ratings
Review scores
Source	Rating
Allmusic	2.5/5 stars

Learning to Be Silent is the third album by composer C. W. Vrtacek, released in 1986 through Cordelia Records. Despite never being individually issued on CD, the album can be found with only the last track, "Crooked Heart," missing, as well as the entire 1988 album "When Heaven Comes to Town" on the 1996 anthology Silent Heaven.

== Track listing ==
All music is composed by C.W. Vrtacek.

Side one
No.	Title	Length
1.	"Poison"	1:20
2.	"War"	1:05
3.	"Tumbling"	3:30
4.	"Inside"	1:11
5.	"Revenge"	2:13
6.	"Song for Marcel"	1:59
7.	"Rain"	2:07
8.	"Emily, Are You Happy?"	3:21
9.	"Breathing"	1:01

Side two
No.	Title	Length
1.	"Silence"	0:24
2.	"When"	1:42
3.	"Thinking"	3:16
4.	"Fly/Wave"	6:01
5.	"Picture in an Empty Frame"	5:05
6.	"Crooked Heart"	1:33

== Personnel ==
- Myles Davis – mixing
- Kim Gellatly – xylophone on "Emily, Are You Happy?"
- Michael Gellatly – illustrations
- Marc Sichel – bass guitar on "Crooked Heart"
- C.W. Vrtacek – synthesizer, acoustic guitar, guitar, piano, xylophone, ukulele, production, mixing, recording
- James Woodruff – narration on "Fly/Wave"
