= Silent Heaven =

Compilation album by C.W. Vrtacek
- Released: March 12, 1996
- Recorded: 1985 – 1988 at Vrtacek's household
- Genre: Electronic
- Length: 77:09
- Label: Cuneiform
- Producer: C.W. Vrtacek

C.W. Vrtacek chronology
| Days of Grace (1992) | Silent Heaven (1996) | Fifteen Mnemonic Devices (1999) |

Silent Heaven is a compilation album by composer C.W. Vrtacek, released on March 12, 1996 through Cuneiform Records. It comprises two of Vrtacek's out-of-print records, Learning to Be Silent and When Heaven Comes to Town.

== Release and reception ==
Professional ratings
Review scores
| Source | Rating |
|---|---|
| Allmusic | 3/5 stars |

Allmusic critic François Couture found Vrtacek's work to be "very aerial" and that "one can't help but think of Steve Hackett's Bay of Kings: simple songs with beautiful melodies." He gave Silent Heaven three out of five stars, noting that "some will perceive it as lacking sustenance, but it is refreshing to hear Vrtacek away from the surf guitar licks."

== Track listing ==
All music is composed by C.W. Vrtacek.

| No. | Title | Length |
|---|---|---|
| 1. | "Poison" | 1:20 |
| 2. | "War" | 1:05 |
| 3. | "Tumbling" | 3:30 |
| 4. | "Inside" | 1:11 |
| 5. | "Revenge" | 2:13 |
| 6. | "Song for Marcel" | 1:59 |
| 7. | "Rain" | 2:07 |
| 8. | "Emily, Are You Happy?" | 3:21 |
| 9. | "Breathing" | 1:01 |
| 10. | "Silence" | 0:24 |
| 11. | "When" | 1:42 |
| 12. | "Thinking" | 3:16 |
| 13. | "Fly/Wave" | 6:01 |
| 14. | "Picture in an Empty Frame" | 5:05 |
| 15. | "Minus My Friend" | 1:33 |
| 16. | "History of the Heart, Mystery of the Mind" | 1:35 |
| 17. | "Part of Me Here, Part of Me With You, Always" | 1:20 |
| 18. | "Stone Steps" | 1:17 |
| 19. | "Preparing the Bridge (For Heaven)" | 5:09 |
| 20. | "Saying Goodbye to the Beauty and Complexity of Life on Earth" | 5:42 |
| 21. | "When Heaven Comes to Town" | 26:16 |

== Personnel ==
- Myles Davis – mixing
- Steven Feigenbaum – production
- Paula Millet – design
- Lucinda Wilde Pinchot – photography
- C.W. Vrtacek – synthesizer, acoustic guitar, guitar, piano, xylophone, ukulele, tape, production, engineering, mixing, recording
