= Sea Life London Aquarium =

Aquarium in London, England

- Interactive map of Sea Life London Aquarium
- 51°30′7″N 0°7′8″W
- Date opened: 28 March 1997; 29 years ago
- Location: South Bank, London, England
- No. of species: 284
- Total volume of tanks: More than 2,000,000 litres (440,000 imp gal; 530,000 US gal)
- Annual visitors: Over 1 million
- Memberships: British and Irish Association of Zoos and Aquariums
- Owner: Merlin Entertainments
- Public transit: Waterloo; Westminster
- Website: www.visitsealife.com/london/

Sea Life London Aquarium is a public aquarium in London, England, located in County Hall on the South Bank of the River Thames. Opened in 1997, it has been part of the Sea Life chain since 2009 and is operated by Merlin Entertainments. It forms part of a cluster of attractions, including the London Eye, London Dungeon, and DreamWorks Tours: Shrek’s Adventure! As of 2025, the aquarium receives more than one million visitors annually.

== History ==
In 2005, the aquarium displayed three robot fish created by the computer science department at the University of Essex. The fish were designed to be autonomous, swimming around and avoiding obstacles like real fish. Their creator claimed that he was trying to combine "the speed of tuna, acceleration of a pike, and the navigating skills of an eel."

In April 2008, the aquarium was purchased by Merlin Entertainments for an undisclosed sum. The facility was closed for a £5 million refurbishment, and reopened as part of the Sea Life chain in April 2009. The additions included a new underwater tunnel, Shark Walk, a revamped Pacific Ocean tank, and a complete rerouting of the exhibit, all of which were carried out under the supervision of architect Kay Elliott.

In May 2011, the aquarium opened a new penguin exhibit, with 10 gentoo penguins transferred from the Edinburgh Zoo. In 2015, the aquarium was moved to a different location in County Hall due to the opening of Shrek's Adventure, London. However, following a sustained two-year campaign, it was announced in 2026 that the penguin exhibit would be moved to a new location at the National Sea Life Centre in Birmingham.

== Conservation and education ==
The aquarium includes two classrooms themed around the conservation campaigns which the zoo supports, which host up to 40,000 school children each year and are open to the public when not in use by the education programme. It is involved in several breeding programmes including the Cuban crocodile, seahorses, butterfly goodeids, and jellyfish, and works with many conservation organisations including Whale and Dolphin Conservation Society and Shark Trust.

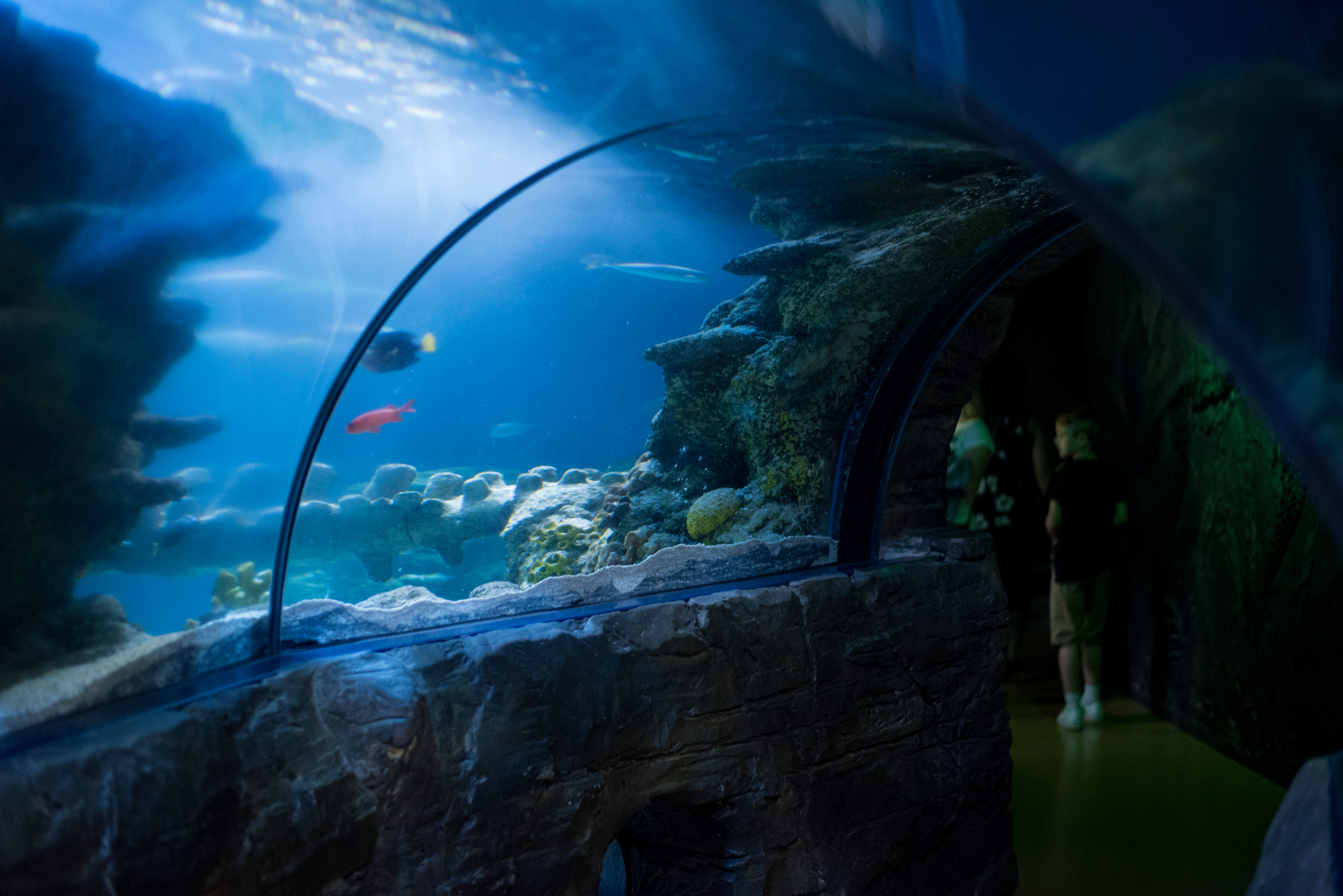
The underwater tunnel.

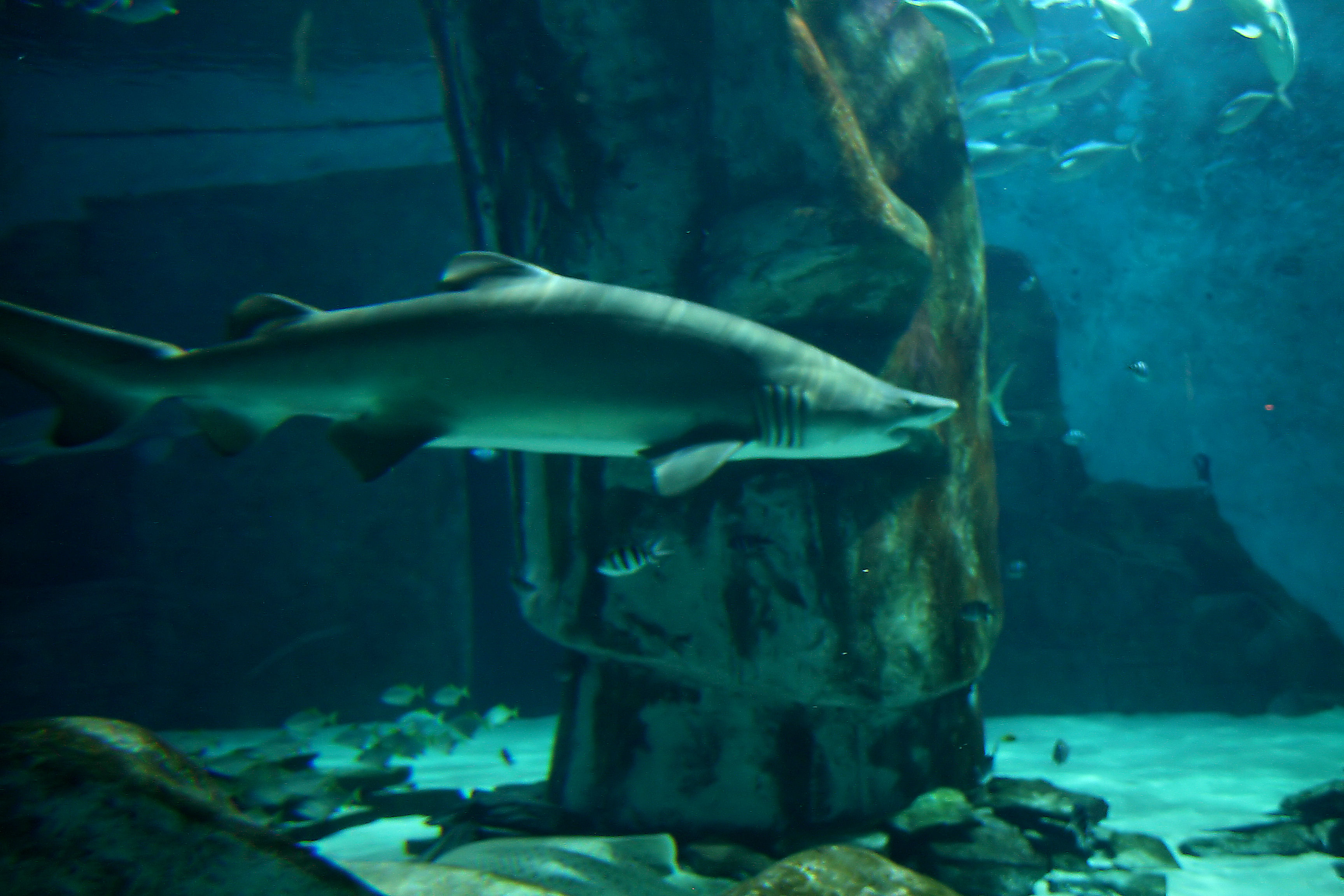
The shark walk.

== Controversies ==
In February 2024, Freedom for Animals launched a campaign criticising the lack of fresh air and daylight in the gentoo penguin enclosure. The movement included animal rights organisations and high-profile celebrities including the Born Free Foundation and Chris Packham. The British newspaper The Daily Express also took part in the campaign. In December 2025, following increased visibility due to protests held outside the aquarium, a cross-party group of 75 MPs signed an open letter calling for the relocation of the fifteen "trapped" penguins to an appropriate facility. Following sustained pressure during 2026, Merlin Entertainments announced that the penguins would be relocated to a new habitat in the National Sea Life Centre, Birmingham, in 2028. The company also announced its intention to end the breeding of gentoo penguins at its UK facilities.

== See also ==
- London Zoo
- Royal Aquarium
- Biota!, a proposed but since cancelled aquarium in London
