= Mnemonist Orchestra (album) =

Studio album by Mnemonist Orchestra
- Released: 1979
- Recorded: March 1979
- Studio: Pendragon (Fort Collins, CO)
- Genre: Free improvisation, free jazz
- Length: 50:38
- Label: Dys
- Producer: William Sharp

Biota chronology
Mnemonist Orchestra (1979)	Some Attributes of a Living System (1980)

Mnemonist Orchestra is the eponymously titled debut studio album of the free improvisation ensemble Mnemonist Orchestra, released in 1979 by Dys Records.

== Background ==
The album was recorded in March 1979 by a group of friends and collaborators coming from diverse backgrounds, including musicians, visual artists, and scientists. Interested in the possibilities of spontaneous interaction among a diverse group, they intended the album to be an exploration of the effects of technological saturation on society, particularly upon children. The music drew heavily from musique concrète and film music, both of which would continue to influence the ensemble's future works.

== Track listing ==
Side one
No.	Title	Length
1.	"Input"	12:00
2.	"Vulnerable, Than Functional"	11:38

Side two
No.	Title	Length
1.	"Corrosive on Contact"	11:20
2.	"Stasis"	15:40

== Personnel ==
Adapted from the Mnemonist Orchestra liner notes.

Mnemonist Orchestra

- Steve Chaffey – drums, percussion
- John Herdt – electric guitar, percussion (A2, B2)
- Torger Hougen – spoken word, illustrations
- Bruce McGregor – tape, conducting, photography, illustrations
- Dave Mowers – trombone, percussion
- Hugh Ragin – trumpet, percussion
- Steve Scholbe – alto saxophone
- William Sharp – tape, conducting, arrangements, production, cover art, design, piano (A2), 5-string electric guitar (B1)
- Randy Yeates – spoken word, illustrations

Additional musicians

- Dave Calvin – bass guitar (B1, B2)
- Dave Marsh – bass guitar (A1, A2)
- Nicki Relic – piano (A1, B1, B2), spoken word (A1)

Production and additional personnel

- Mark Derbyshire – engineering

== Release history ==
Region	Date	Label	Format	Catalog
United States	1979	Dys	LP	DYS 01
