= Almost Never (album) =

Studio album by Biota
- Released: 1992
- Recorded: Summer 1989 – Winter 1992
- Studio: Dys Studios (Fort Collins, CO)
- Genre: Experimental music, electroacoustic music, musique concrète
- Length: 52:06
- Label: ReR
- Producer: Tom Katsimpalis, Mark Piersel, Steve Scholbe, William Sharp, Gordon H. Whitlow, Larry Wilson, Randy Yeates

Biota chronology
Tumble (1989)	Almost Never (1992)	Object Holder (1995)

Professional ratings
Review scores
Source	Rating
Allmusic	3.5/5 stars

Almost Never is the tenth studio album by experimental music ensemble Biota, released in 1992 by ReR Megacorp. The album focuses compositionally upon three electroacoustic suites for winds, strings, and processed acoustic/ethnic/antique instrumentation ("Burn Daylight" – "Circling These" – "Old Reason Road").

== Track listing ==
All music is composed by Biota.

No.	Title	Length
1.	"Burn Daylight" (1)	4:01
2.	"Burn Daylight" (2)	3:24
3.	"Burn Daylight" (3)	3:07
4.	"Burn Daylight" (4)	2:31
5.	"Burn Daylight" (5)	2:06
6.	"Burn Daylight" (6)	1:18
7.	"Circling These" (1)	0:45
8.	"Circling These" (2)	3:50
9.	"Circling These" (3)	3:09
10.	"Circling These" (4)	2:20
11.	"Circling These" (5)	3:43
12.	"Circling These" (6)	1:31
13.	"Circling These" (7)	0:41
14.	"Circling These" (8)	2:08
15.	"Old Reason Road" (1)	2:08
16.	"Old Reason Road" (2)	0:40
17.	"Old Reason Road" (3)	4:09
18.	"Old Reason Road" (4)	5:37
19.	"Old Reason Road" (5)	3:30
20.	"Old Reason Road" (6)	1:27

== Personnel ==
Adapted from the Almost Never liner notes.

Biota

- James Gardner – Rhodes piano, tape, flugelhorn
- Tom Katsimpalis – guitar, bass guitar, banjo, ukulele, harmonica, Rhodes piano, pump organ, percussion, cover art, design
- Steve Scholbe – bass clarinet, alto saxophone, guitar, banjo, ukulele, zither, recorder, harmonica, percussion
- William Sharp – hurdy-gurdy, tape, engineering
- Gordon H. Whitlow – harp, Rhodes piano, Estey pump organ, concert (low) whistle
- Larry Wilson – drums

Additional musicians

- Randy Yeates – mbira and steel drums (13)

Production and additional personnel

- Biota – production, mixing, arrangements
- Joan McAninch – mastering
- Richard Pena – recording
- Dirk Vallons – design

== Release history ==
Region	Date	Label	Format	Catalog
United States	1992	ReR	CD	RēRBCD3
