= Roto-Limbs =

Studio album by Mnemonists
- Released: 1981
- Recorded: Pendragon (Fort Collins, CO)
- Genre: Drone, industrial
- Length: 80:49
- Label: Dys

Biota chronology
Horde (1981)	Roto-Limbs (1981)	Biota (1982)

Roto-Limbs is a studio album by the free improvisation ensemble Mnemonist Orchestra, issued as a limited edition, cassette-only release in 1981 by Dys Records.

== Track listing ==
Side one
No.	Title	Length
1.	"Brittle-Legs (Prehistory)"	19:32
2.	"Extinct Chitinous Species"	10:04
3.	"Primate Alerts"	16:35

Side two
No.	Title	Length
1.	"Beast Rites"	4:30
2.	"Insecta Alarms"	16:47
3.	"Horde Maintenance Noise"	13:22

== Personnel ==
Adapted from the Roto-Limbs liner notes.

Mnemonists

- Mark Derbyshire – instruments
- Steve Emmons – instruments
- Rolf Goranson – instruments
- Steve Scholbe – instruments
- William Sharp – instruments

== Release history ==
Region	Date	Label	Format	Catalog
United States	1981	Dys	Cassette	DYS 06
