= Robert Iolini =

Australian born composer, artist, filmmaker and radio producer

Robert John Iolini (born 1960) is an Australian-born composer, artist, filmmaker and radio producer.

== Early life and education ==
Iolini completed a Master of Arts degree in Advanced Composition under the supervision of Professor Richard Vella in 1998. The title of the thesis was Simultaneity in Music.

== Career ==
=== Chamber music, operas & sonic essays ===
Robert (Roberto) Iolini began his professional artistic career as a classical contemporary composer in 1994. His concert debut came on 27 August 1994 with the premiere performance of his compositions "Carne Bianca" and "Lingo Babel", written for violin, piano, bass clarinet and saxophone. These two compositions were commissioned and performed by Australian new music ensemble austraLYSIS at the Sydney Conservatorium of Music, Australia.

The following year on 29 October 1995 Australian ensemble Synergy Percussion performed his compositions "Whyitiso", "Lingo Babel", "Congo" and "Zimbabwe" at the Enmore Theatre in Sydney, Australia. In 1999, Iolini was commissioned by Danish duo Musica Mirabilis to compose The Cavern of I. The piece is scored for violin, piano and electronics. It had its world premiere at the Copenhagen Radio Hall in Copenhagen, Denmark, on 9 May 1999. Another Danish group called Ensemble Nordlys, performed the world premiere of Iolini's composition for violin and piano entitled "Anyong Arrirang" at Toldkammere in Elsinore, Denmark on 19 May 1999. At the same concert, Ensemble Nordlys gave the Danish premiere of Iolini's compositions, "Lingo Babel", "Whyitiso", "Congo" and "Zimbabwe". The following year Ensemble Nordlys commissioned and performed the world premiere of Iolini's composition "Okinawa".

Iolini is also known as a composer of electroacoustic music. Characteristic features of his electro-acoustic compositions are spoken and sung vocals and themes that explore social justice and contemporary culture. The form and style of these works, ostensibly for radio, vary greatly. Iolini often crafts field recordings, archival material, musical samples, scripted dialogues, original songs and instrumentals, into finely detailed narrative compositions that blur the boundaries between drama, documentary and experimental music.

The first example of this style is his radio opera Vanunu – which tells the story leading up to the arrest and imprisonment of Israeli nuclear whistle-blower Mordechai Vanunu, co-written with David Nerlich. It was commissioned and broadcast on 25 July 1994 by the Australian Broadcasting Corporation (ABC).

Iolini's first solo composition for radio was in 1996. Another large scale musical work entitled Impermanence, which he describes as "a musical meditation on the impermanence of life and love". Impermanence was the ABC's entry in the Music category of the 1996 Prix Italia, Naples.

With the continued support of the ABC's radio arts program The Listening Room on ABC Classic FM, Iolini went on to create many experimental works for radio, such as Hong Kong: City in Between (1997), The Edwin Armstrong Overture (1997), Silent Motion (1998), Marking Time (1999) and Goddesses and Rabbits (2003). Hong Kong: City in Between was a prize-winner in the Soundscapes (be)for(e) 2000 festival in Amsterdam and Marking Time was nominated for the Karl Sczuka Prize (2000). Excerpts and complete versions of some of these works, although ostensibly for radio, appear on Iolini's two solo albums Iolini (2001) and Songs From Hurt (2005), both released on Chris Culter's ReR (Recommended) label. Both albums received favourable reviews.

In 2003, with support from the Australia Council for the Arts New Media Board, Iolini was New Media Artist in residence at The Listening Room, where he created the 45-minute radio artwork, The Sound of Forgetting. In this work, Iolini crafts "lost sounds from Sydney's past, media archives and scripted dialogues" into a sonic essay on the loss of identity as a result of disappearing buildings and architecture. The Sound of Forgetting was nominated for the 2005 Karl Sczuka Prize.

Iolini is a fully represented composer at the Australian Music Centre.

=== Socially engaged art ===
Between 1998 and 2006 Iolini worked as a musical director and composer with multi-award-winning Australian arts and social-justice company Big hART. He collaborated on numerous large-scale multi-media projects with Big hArt. For each project Iolini would often travel to remote areas in Australia to work with marginalised groups or communities. Supported by a team of arts and community professionals Iolini would conduct workshops with members of the community to generate sonic content, such as environmental sounds, words and musical performances. He would go on to organise these disparate sonic materials into musical works that would be incorporated into multimedia theatrical performances under to overall direction of Scott Rankin. During his years with Big hArt, Iolini would work closely with artistic director Rankin on projects which covered a wide range of locations and social issues – from juvenile justice in Australia's Northern Territory to the plight of shack dwellers in the remote North West of Tasmania.

Iolini would often extend these ostensibly theatrical projects into the radio medium by reworking field recordings and music he had composed for each project. He produced a total of eight feature length radio pieces for the ABC adapted from Big hArt theatre projects.

=== Film and multimedia ===
In 2003 Iolini began experimenting with filmmaking. His contribution to the medium is to approach the images of his subjects from the perspective of sound and music. One technique he uses, is to edit footage to an existing musical composition, as in his short existential drama film, The Holographic Ear (2006), and his humorous take on humanoid robots, Geminoid Tear (2010). Another technique he uses in many of his films is to work directly and simultaneously with sound, text and image sources without reliance on a script, treating the editing process as a musical composition. Examples of this process are his short films, Ghosts of the Tsunami (2014), Black Sheep (2005), Forat de La Vergonya (2004). All of Iolini's films have been screened at international festivals or art events.

Between 2007 and 2008, Iolini created The Hong Kong Agent, a cross-media multi-platform art project about Hong Kong. The project was premiered at the Hong Kong Arts Centre's 30th Anniversary Exhibition between 3–29 August 2008. In this iteration, the project was exhibited as a multi-art form installation which included a three channel video and a locative media component using mobile phones and bluetooth technology.

As part of the Hong Kong Agent project Iolini created 18 short films, comprising a total of 80 minutes. The video series incorporates elements and styles from cinema, video art, and documentary. These films continue to be exhibited in various contexts and countries. 4A Centre for Contemporary Asian Art described The Hong Kong Agent as "an intimate and poetic exploration of contemporary Hong Kong culture... an edgy work which replicates the vitality and innovation of an ultra future/retro megapolis". The Hong Kong Agent also exists as a 90-minute radio feature.

In 2009 Iolini began focusing on Japanese society. He has produced a number of film and sound works which explore various aspects of Japanese contemporary culture. Film works include Dream City (2009), The Masked Woman of Kyoto (2009), Geminoid Tear (2010) and Ghosts of the Tsunami (2014). Experimental sound works commissioned by the ABC include Sonic Kyoto (2011) and Post Human (2011). In 2015 Iolini established Studio Syncandi [sɪn ˈkændi], an independent artist studio based in Kyoto, Japan, to produce and distribute his graphic novel and music project Syncandi.

== Discography ==
- QUARTERLY, ReR: Vol 4 No. 2 CD (1997, Recommended Records)
- Double exposure / The Listening Room (1997, ABC Music)
- Soundscapes Be)for(e 2000 (2000, SSC)
- iolini (2001, Recommended Records)
- Songs from Hurt (2005, Recommended Records)
