= Biota (album) =

Studio album by Mnemonists
- Released: 1982
- Recorded: Summer 1980 – Summer 1982
- Studio: Pendragon (Fort Collins, CO)
- Genre: Drone, ambient
- Length: 40:25
- Label: Dys
- Producer: Steve Scholbe, William Sharp

Biota chronology
Roto-Limbs (1981)	Biota (1982)	Gyromancy (1984)

Biota is the fourth studio album by the free improvisation ensemble Mnemonist Orchestra, released in 1982 by Dys Records.

== Track listing ==
Side one
No.	Title	Music	Length
1.	"Biota"	Steve Scholbe, William Sharp	13:00
2.	"Biohazards"	Mark Derbyshire, Steve Scholbe, William Sharp	7:19

Side two
No.	Title	Music	Length
1.	"Marshland"	Steve Scholbe, William Sharp	6:18
2.	"Loop-Dance"	Steve Scholbe, William Sharp	2:47
3.	"Beasts"	Steve Scholbe, William Sharp	4:28
4.	"The Magi"	Steve Emmons, Rolf Goranson	2:32
5.	"Insect Dialogue"	Steve Scholbe, William Sharp	0:40
6.	"Cavernicoles"	Steve Scholbe, William Sharp	1:37
7.	"Chamer"	Steve Scholbe, William Sharp	0:38
8.	"Krill"	Steve Scholbe, William Sharp	1:10

== Personnel ==
Adapted from the Horde liner notes.

Mnemonists

- Mark Derbyshire – recorder, electronics, mastering
- Steve Emmons – tape, percussion, spoken word
- Rolf Goranson – bass guitar, tape, spoken word
- Steve Scholbe – alto saxophone, electric guitar, organ, electronics, tape, production
- William Sharp – tape, clarinet, percussion, electronic, production, mastering

Additional musicians

- Bill Burgess – percussion
- Karen Nakai – bass guitar

Production and additional personnel

- James Dixon – cover art, illustrations
- Richard Donaldson – mastering
- Tom Katsimpalis – illustrations, design

== Release history ==
Region	Date	Label	Format	Catalog
United States	1982	Dys	LP	DYS 07
