= Boris Kovač =

Serbian music composer

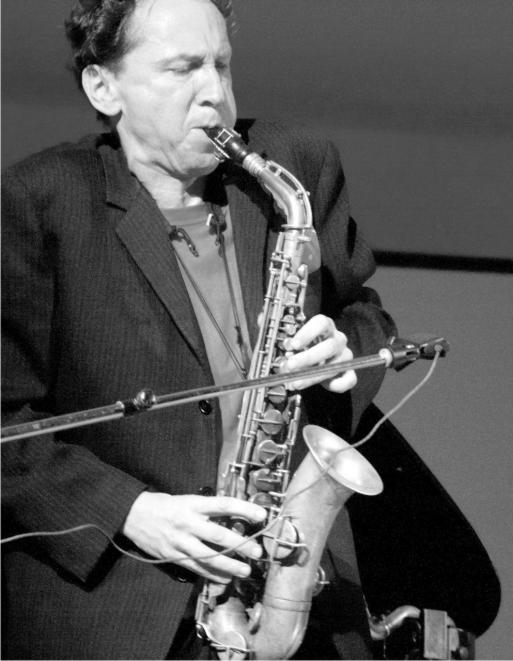
Jazzist Boris Kovač, photo by Želimir Gvojić

Boris Kovač (Serbian: Борис Ковач, Boris Kovač; born 1955) is a Serbian composer and multi-instrumentalist.

== Biography ==
Kovač was born in Novi Sad, Vojvodina region of Serbia, then part of Yugoslavia. He studied on the accordion as a child and later received one year of instruction on saxophone, but is self-taught on a wide array of instruments.

In 1977 he formed Meta Sekcija, a jazz group. In 1982 he created Ritual Nova, an ensemble of musicians, visual artists, dancers and performers, and served as its composer and director. Kovač released his first album, Ritual Nova, in 1986 in Yugoslavia, and Recommended Records of the United Kingdom released its 1989 follow-up, Ritual Nova 2, as part of its eastern European music series, Points East. In 1989, Kovač established Ogledalo, a chamber music theater group in Novi Sad.

From 1991 to 1996, Kovač lived in Italy, Slovenia and Austria to escape the Yugoslav wars, but he returned to Serbia following the cessation of fighting. Inspired by the 1999 NATO bombing of Yugoslavia in the Kosovo War, he formed La Danza Apocalyptica Balcanica, shortened to LaDaABa Orchest, in 2001. The group played ballroom dance music "to exorcise the madness of war." In 2001 he released The Last Balkan Tango with the Ladaaba Orchestra.

In 2002, Kovač founded Kachara Records (from the Serbian качар kačar) named for his family house in Bukovac (part of the Petrovaradin municipality in the city of Novi Sad) in Vojvodina, where wine was produced from 1868 to 1941. In August 2005 he released the album World after history as Boris Kovač and La Campanella. He received a Sterija's Award, the biggest Serbian theatre award, for music in the year 2007 for the play “Nahod Simeon”.

In 2008 his DVD collection Before and after Apocalypse received the prize of the German Critics Association. In 2009 Boris composed the music for White, white World, a fiction film directed by Oleg Novković .

== Music ==
Kovač's music draws on folklore traditions – not only Serbian ones, but also Hungarian and Romanian, since they all factor in the musical culture of multi-ethnic Vojvodina. In his Last Balkan Tango, he combines these traditions with the styles of Argentine tango. His musical output falls into three categories: the deeply spiritual cycles he writes for his ensemble Ritual Nova, the more formal contemporary chamber music for dance and theater, and the dance music of his LaDaABa Orchest.

"Our advantage is that people from 20 different nationalities live together in the Pannonian Plains. So today no one can say which folklore my music stems from exactly."

== Discography ==
- Ritual Nova (1986). Symposion Records, Yugoslavia.
- Ritual Nova 2 (1989). Recommended Records, United Kingdom.
- Ritual Nova Collection (1993). Recommended Records, United Kingdom.
- Play on String (string quartet) (1996). More Music, Italy.
- Anamnesis — Ecumenical Mysteries (1996). Victo, Canada.
- The Mask (1997). Interzone/Ikarus, Yugoslavia/Austria.
- East OFF Europe (1998). Victo, Canada.
- Mirror of the Voice (CD and book) (1999). Radio 021, Yugoslavia.
- Last Balkan Tango: An Apocalyptic Dance Party (2001). Piranha, Germany.
- Ballads at the End of Time (2003). Piranha, Germany.
- Profana Liturgija, ADN, Milan, 1991 (2004). Kachara, Yugoslavia.
- Damari (2004). Kachara, Yugoslavia.
- World after History (2005). Piranha, Germany.
- Songs From The Garden Of Loves & Graves (2007). Serbian National Theatre. Limited edition of 300 copies.
- Before and After ... Apocalypse (2008) (DVD) Piranha, Germany.
- Chamber Music (2010). B92.
- Catalogue Of Memories (2012). Kachara
- Fly By... (2012). Multimedia Music
- On Eastern Way: Boris Kovač & David Yengibarian (2012). Interzone Production
- Someone Killed the Swan (Laments On South-Eastern Europe): Ultima Armonia (2014). Leo Records
- Times Of Day (2015). ReR Megacorp
- The Path: Boris Kovač, New Ritual Group (2016). ReR Megacorp
- Muzika Za Vere I Zavere (2016). Multimedia Music
- Mosaic of Time: Boris Kovač, New Ritual Group (2020). Kachara
- Late October Lights: Ultima Armonia (2020). Kachara
- White World - Music for Dance And...: Boris Kovač, New Ritual Quartet (2020). Kachara
