= Biota! =

Proposed aquarium in Docklands, London

- Architect's image of Biota!
- Interactive map of Biota!
- 51°30′11″N 0°1′55.2″E
- Location: Silvertown Quays, Docklands, London
- Floor space: 14,500 square metres (156,000 sq ft)
- No. of species: 550 (planned)
- Major exhibits: Amazon, British Isles, Atlantic & Indo-Pacific biomes

Biota! was a proposed aquarium in the Silvertown Quays redevelopment, on the site of Millennium Mills adjacent to the Royal Victoria Dock, part of the wider Thames Gateway regeneration project for East London. The £80 million building by Terry Farrell & Partners architects was given outline planning permission in March 2005 and was initially expected to be completed in 2008, but the project was cancelled in 2009.

== Plan ==
Biota! was to be operated by the Zoological Society of London and would have been the world's first aquarium entirely based on the principles of conservation. The design for the aquarium incorporated four biomes, each representing an entire ecosystem including trees, other plants, invertebrates, amphibians, reptiles, mammals and birds as well as fish.

"The aquarium at Silvertown Quays will be an international visitor attraction worthy of Europe's world class city. The Zoological Society of London, which will operate the aquarium is well known worldwide for its research and conservation efforts."

— Ken Livingstone, former Mayor of London

The planned completion date slipped as the Silvertown Quays development struggled to secure funding. In June 2008, Building magazine announced that the aquarium was "under review because of the credit crunch", citing the 2008 financial crisis as the reason for the lack of progress on the project. This placed the rest of the development in jeopardy because the planning obligations required the aquarium to be built before the rest of the scheme. In September 2009, the landowner London Development Agency withdrew from the agreement, effectively ending the project.

Biota! would have formed one of the main public attractions of the 60-acre (24 ha), £1.5 billion development, along with Silvertown Venture Xtreme, an extreme sports and surf centre.

== See also ==
- Sea Life London Aquarium, an existing aquarium in central London
