= Biota (band) =

American experimental electronic band

- Also known as: Biota-Mnemonists, Mnemonists, Mnemonist Orchestra
- Origin: Fort Collins, Colorado, United States
- Genres: Experimental music, electroacoustic music, musique concrète, free improvisation
- Years active: 1979–present
- Labels: Recommended Records (RēR) (1986-present), Dys (1979-1985), Bad Alchemy, Anomalous Records, No Man's Land
- Members: William Sharp; Tom Katsimpalis; Larry Wilson; Steve Scholbe; Randy Yeates; Mark Piersel; James Gardner; Randy Miotke; Gordon H. Whitlow; Kristianne Gale; Mark Rosoff; Karl J. Palouček
- Past members: Charles O'Meara; David Zekman; Mark Derbyshire; Amy Derbyshire; Chris Cutler; Susanne Lewis; Andy Kredt; Genevieve Heistek; Rolf Goranson; Steve Emmons; Carol Heineman; Karen Nakai
- Website: biotamusic.com

Biota is an American experimental electronic music ensemble active since the late 1970s.

== Musical career ==
Against the fertile creative backdrop of late 1970s Fort Collins, Colorado, the American ensemble Biota's first recorded projects were produced under the name Mnemonist Orchestra (shortened soon after to Mnemonists). Founded by fellow scientists and community radio engineers Mark Derbyshire and William Sharp, the Mnemonists collective of fine artists, musicians, and college-town bohemians released five self-styled albums between 1978 and 1984 on the group's Dys label. Horde (1981, Dys), a seminal album of electronically processed music, garnered particular interest for its groundbreaking use of unconventional sound manipulation, musique concrète techniques, and early period instrumentation — including from the Recommended Records/RēR label, who rereleased the LP on its imprint in 1984. Following the release of Gyromancy in 1984, the ensemble split into two collaborative factions: a visual-arts group, which retained the name Mnemonists, and the musical group, Biota.

Since the mid-1980s, Biota has released numerous idiosyncratic titles, mostly on the RēR label. These include Rackabones (1985, Dys) and Bellowing Room (1987), successive albums focusing on themes of displacement, solitude, and the consequences of long-term institutionalization; Tinct (1988); the Awry 10" (1988, Bad Alchemy); and Tumble (1989), a commissioned work for RēR. Almost Never (1992, RēR) features three voluminous suites for winds, strings, and processed acoustic/ethnic/antique instrumentation. Recordings and production for these and other Biota albums primarily took place during this period at Bughouse Studio in Loveland, Colorado, and Dys studios in Fort Collins and Bellvue, Colorado.

Object Holder (1995, RēR) witnessed the group expanding beyond its immediate geographic boundaries to include U.K. drummer Chris Cutler (Henry Cow, News From Babel), New York-based vocalist Susanne Lewis (Hail), Denver prog-guitar virtuoso Andy Kredt (d. 2006), and East Coast multi-instrumentalist/composer Charles O'Meara (a.k.a. C.W. Vrtacek of Forever Einstein, d. 2018), who subsequently joined the group as a regular member, contributing numerous classically-based piano compositions over the course of several albums. Object Holder was the first Biota album to feature "songs", with lyrics written by the group's Tom Katsimpalis, as well as by guest artist Cutler, performed by Lewis.

For Invisible Map (2001, RēR), the group welcomed guest artist Genevieve Heistek (Set Fire to Flames, HṚṢṬA) on vocals and violin. AllMusic.com states, "With its wide range covering delicate post-folkish pop songs to ambient soundscapes, Invisible Map may be the collective's most accomplished and accessible release to date. All music styles (folk, jazz, blues, rock, musique concrète, free improv, etc.) coalesce to be filtered through the dreamer's ears — background vocals are slightly treated, soloing instruments are heard from a distance, rhythm tracks are deliberately just a bit out of sync. This way, the simple tunes never really come into focus, giving the whole album an aura of mystery."

The group reemerged in 2007 with its next release, Half a True Day (RēR), an album of increased nuance and subtlety, introducing folk guitarist and vocalist Kristianne Gale. On Cape Flyaway (2012, RēR), traditional folk ballads, sung by Gale, are interspersed amid original Biota compositions. 2014's Funnel to a Thread (RēR) yields at times a more understated take on some of the same instrumental/vocal elements and themes contained within the previous two CDs, only now influenced perhaps more deeply by the aesthetics of Morton Feldman, Hector Zazou, Mark Hollis, and other masters of electroacoustic sound exploration, minimalism, and Americana.

Biota celebrated its 40th year of existence in 2019 with the release of Fragment for Balance on RēR:

BIOTA: Fragment for Balance—After 4 years of work on their 11th release for ReR, this extraordinary, reclusive, and highly individual audio-visual collective continues to evolve through the painstaking accumulation and disposition of a seemingly incompatible range of both exotic and familiar musical languages, instruments, techniques and studio manipulations - into one of the few genuinely original bands at work today. It took a long time to refine their unique process of composition to this level of ambiguity and depth, and newcomers will wonder how they strayed so far from orthodoxy and yet managed to retain a lucidity and transparency that is quite rare in contemporary music. Timeless, almost weightless - yet teeming with life, motion and complexity - this is a music that suggests an untroubled world in which nostalgia, tragedy and agon, while rudely present, remain subservient to deeper, calmer currents. 'Sic transit gloria mundi.' More plainly, these are not conventional compositions, nor are they collective improvisations; but are made of simultaneities, conspiracies, accidents, careful planning and a guiding aesthetic that is both exacting and empirical. Classic.

The Biota Box is a 6-CD set that highlights music from four decades of the group's recorded output (including music released as Mnemonists). It includes Counterbalance, a 2019 companion CD to Fragment for Balance of previously unreleased Biota recordings/compositions. The inner booklet contained in Counterbalance features a detailed history of the group, with commentary by co-founders Sharp and Derbyshire. Measured Not Found was released on RēR in 2025, the group's first full-length album in 6 years.

Biota's lineup, as appears on 2025's Measured Not Found, features Kristianne Gale (vocals, strumstick), James Gardner (symphonic & chamber compositions, arrangement), Tom Katsimpalis (electric, nylon, and 12-string guitars, Clavioline, harmonica, ektara, prepared music boxes), Randy Miotke (Rhodes, trumpet, synthesizers, percussion, mix, editing, engineering), Charles O'Meara (piano, composition), Karl J. Palouček (pianos, French horns, metal pipe), Mark Piersel (acoustic guitars, electric bass, mix, editing, processing), Mark Rosoff (flutes), Steve Scholbe (acoustic archtop guitar, rubab), Bill Sharp (production, engineering, mix, editing, electronic processing, and arrangement), Gordon Whitlow (Hammond organs, Estey pump organ, Weltmeister accordion), Larry Wilson (kit drums, tablas, dumbek, tar drum, engineering), Randy Yeates (Biomellodrone keyboard), and David Zekman (violin and processed bowed strings).

As with all Biota releases, extensive visual works are provided by the Mnemonists visual-arts contingent (featuring through the years Larry Wilson, Randy Yeates, Ken DeVries, Tom Katsimpalis, James Dixon, Bill Ellsworth, Dana Sharp, Heidi Eversley, Joy Froding, Dirk Vallons, Ann Stretton, E.M. Thomas, Stan Starbuck, Simon Abbate, Et al.).

== Working methods ==
Biota adheres to an unpredictable method of organizing sounds that ideally invites listeners to imbue proceedings with their own individualized interpretations and experiences (much like interpreting a work of abstract visual art), thereby allowing for an element of "listener composition". Such a concept is in keeping with notions of community collaboration and song evolution inherent in many forms of traditional folk music.

== Performance ==
Biota-Mnemonists has taken to the stage for live performance only twice — in 1981, at the Colorado State University art school in Fort Collins, Colorado, and in November 1990 at the then-annual New Music America festival, held that year in Montreal, Quebec. Under the festival banner "Musiques Actuelles", the group premiered a suite of original works composed specifically for the occasion, featuring live (real-time) production and projected animation created by Mnemonists artist Heidi Eversley. The entire musical program of the New Music America performance was eventually released on CD as Musique Actuelle 1990 (2004), on Anomalous.

== Discography ==
=== As Mnemonist Orchestra ===
- Mnemonist Orchestra (LP, 1979, DYS 01, Dys Records)

=== As Mnemonists ===
- Some Attributes of a Living System (LP, 1980, DYS 02, Dys Records)
- Horde (LP, 1981, DYS 03, Dys Records; LP rerelease, 1984, Recommended Records))
- Roto-Limbs (cassette, 1981, DYS 06, Dys Records)
- Biota (LP, 1982, DYS 07, Dys Records)
- Gyromancy (LP, 1984, DYS 10, Dys Records; CD rerelease, 2004, RēR)
- "Nailed/Tic" (7", 1984, Recommended Records)

=== As Biota ===
- Rackabones (2xLP, 1985, DYS 12, Dys Records)
- Bellowing Room (LP, 1987, Recommended Records)
- Tinct (LP, 1988, Recommended Records)
  - Bellowing Room/Tinct (CD rerelease, 1990, RēR)
- Awry (10", 1988, Bad Alchemy)
- Tumble (CD, 1989, RēR)
- Almost Never (CD, 1992, RēR)
- Object Holder (CD, 1995, RēR)
- Invisible Map (CD, 2001, RēR)
- Half a True Day (CD, 2007, RēR)
- Cape Flyaway (CD, 2012, RēR)
- Funnel to a Thread (CD, 2014, RēR)
- Fragment for Balance (CD, 2019, RēR)
- The Biota Box (6-CD anthology; includes Counterbalance, a CD of previously unreleased material, 2019, RēR)
- Measured Not Found (CD, 2025, RēR)

=== As Biota-Mnemonists ===
- Musique Actuelle 1990 (live) (CD, 2004, Anomalous Records)

=== Guest appearances ===
- "Fakeloo" on Bad Alchemy, Nr. 5 (cassette, Bad Alchemy, 1986)
- "Early Rest Home" on Rē Records Quarterly Vol.1 No.3 (LP, RēR 0103, 1986)
  - also released on Rē Records Quarterly Selections from Vol. 1 (CD, RēR, 1991)
- "Hidden Aboard" on A Classic Guide to No Man's Land (CD, No Man's Land, 1988)
- "Walk Aside" on Rē Records Quarterly Vol.4 No.1 (CD, RēR 0401, 1994)
- Art Bears, The Art Box (2004, remixes, RēR)
- "Watch and Watch" on $100 Guitar Project (CD, Bridge Records, 2013)

=== Related projects ===
- Mark Piersel, Distant Lives (cassette, Dys, 1983)
