= Days of Grace (album) =

Compilation album by C.W. Vrtacek
- Released: 1992
- Recorded: 1980 – 1982
- Genre: Electronic
- Length: 65:45
- Label: Dom America
- Producer: Jon Carlson

C.W. Vrtacek chronology
When Heaven Comes to Town (1988)	Days of Grace (1992)	Silent Heaven (1996)

Days of Grace is a compilation album by composer C.W. Vrtacek, released on March 12, 1992 through Dom America. It comprises two of Vrtacek's out-of-print records, Victory Through Grace and Days and Days.

== Release and reception ==
Professional ratings
Review scores
Source	Rating
Allmusic	3/5 stars

Allmusic critic John Bush stated that concerning Vrtacek, Days of Grace "displays his gift of incorporating many genres (including jazz, electronic, ambient) within the frame of rock."

== Track listing ==
All music is composed by C.W. Vrtacek, except "Nearly Temporary" by Mel Lovrin.

No.	Title	Length
1.	"Wirephoto"	0:33
2.	"To Hold Walls Together"	2:04
3.	"A Foreign Gun"	5:35
4.	"Muscles to Mousetraps"	2:46
5.	"What Men Want Most"	1:38
6.	"Sink"	0:23
7.	"Sink"	0:27
8.	"The Waters"	3:29
9.	"How They Spoke to the Deaf"	5:58
10.	"Transport"	3:58
11.	"Pontos"	4:15
12.	"Wirephoto"	0:34
13.	"Waving Hand"	0:39
14.	"Nearly Temporary"	1:58
15.	"Include Me Out"	0:40
16.	"Picture This"	5:57
17.	"The Season on the Line"	2:32
18.	"Sitting by the Window Looking Out"	1:06
19.	"Cast No Shadow When You Leave"	2:58
20.	"The Day the Sun Burned Out"	1:35
21.	"Flags"	4:28
22.	"An Infinite Number"	7:30
23.	"Days and Days"	3:42

== Personnel ==
- Jon Carlson – production
- Nick Didkovsky – mixing
- Leslie Elias – voice on "Flags"
- Jim Flora – photography
- Nick Jacobs – voice on "Flags"
- Mel Lovrin – voice on "A Foreign Gun", keyboards on "Nearly Temporary"
- Peter Nuhn – illustration
- Roger Seibel – mastering
- C.W. Vrtacek – guitar, synthesizer, tape, clarinet, drums, percussion, violin, mandolin, voice, keyboards, engineering, mixing
