= C. W. Vrtacek =

American musical artist (1953–2018)

- Born: Charles O'Meara; March 13, 1953; Old Saybrook, Connecticut, US
- Died: October 20, 2018 (aged 65) Madison, Connecticut, US
- Genres: Electronic
- Occupations: Musician, composer
- Years active: 1980–2018
- Formerly of: Biota; Forever Einstein

Charles O'Meara (March 13, 1953 – October 20, 2018) better known as C. W. Vrtacek, was an American multi-instrumentalist and composer. He was a founding member of Forever Einstein and group member with Biota.

== Career ==
Vrtacek took up guitar at the age of 11, and played in the band Dancing Lessons before starting Forever Einstein with Dancing Lessons drummer John Roulat.

Vrtacek claimed to be influenced by anything from rock, folk, jazz, blues, ska, punk, avant garde, classical, to Irish music. He also cited unorthodox things such as church hymns, cartoon music, and the sounds made by pinball machines as being inspirational. His solo music drew equally from the dissonances of Stockhausen and Varese as well as the melodies of French impressionists such as Erik Satie and Maurice Ravel, and also used tape loops.

In 2013, Vrtacek, along with Nick Didkovsky of Doctor Nerve, conceived and released the "$100 Guitar Project", a recorded project based upon the "journey" of a guitar purchased from a secondhand music shop for $100 that passed through the hands of over 65 players, each of whom recorded a piece with it and then signed it, in turn passing it along to the next player to do the same. The two-CD set, released on Bridge Records, features performances by such noted guitarists and musicians as Alex Skolnick, Fred Frith, Nels Cline, and many others.

== Discography ==
Solo

Year	Name	Ref
1981	Victory Through Grace	
1982	Days and Days	
1986	Learning to Be Silent	
1988	When Heaven Comes to Town	
1992	Days of Grace	
1996	Silent Heaven	
1999	Fifteen Mnemonic Devices	
2008	By Chance	

Forever Einstein

Year	Name	Ref
1990	Artificial Horizon	
1992	Opportunity Crosses the Bridge	
1998	One Thing After Another	
2000	Down With Gravity	
2005	Racket Science	

with Biota

Year	Name	Ref
1995	Object Holder	
2001	Invisible Map	
2007	Half a True Day	
2012	Cape Flyaway	
2014	Funnel to a Thread	
2018	Fragment for Balance	

Collaboration

Year	Name	Artist	Ref
1984	Monkey on a Hard Roll	w/ Dancing Lessons	
1999	Preacher in Naked Chase Guilty	w/ Chris Cutler & Thomas Dimuzio	
2013	The $100 Guitar Project	w/ various solo artists	
