= Recommended Records =

British independent record label

- Founded: March 1978
- Founder: Chris Cutler
- Distributors: RēR Megacorp (UK); RēR USA (US); Locus Solus (Japan)
- Genre: Rock in Opposition, avant-rock, experimental music
- Country of origin: England
- Location: Thornton Heath, London
- Official website: www.rermegacorp.com

Recommended Records (RēR) is a British independent record label and distribution network founded by Chris Cutler with Nick Hobbes in March 1978. RēR features largely "Rock in Opposition" and related music, but it also distributes selected music released on other independent labels.

In 1982 Cutler established November Books, the publishing wing of Recommended Records, and between 1985 and 1997, Recommended Records and November Books published RēR Quarterly, a "quarterly" sound-magazine edited by Cutler.

In 1989 Recommended Records became known as RēR Megacorp with a turnover of £180,000 in 1994.

== History ==
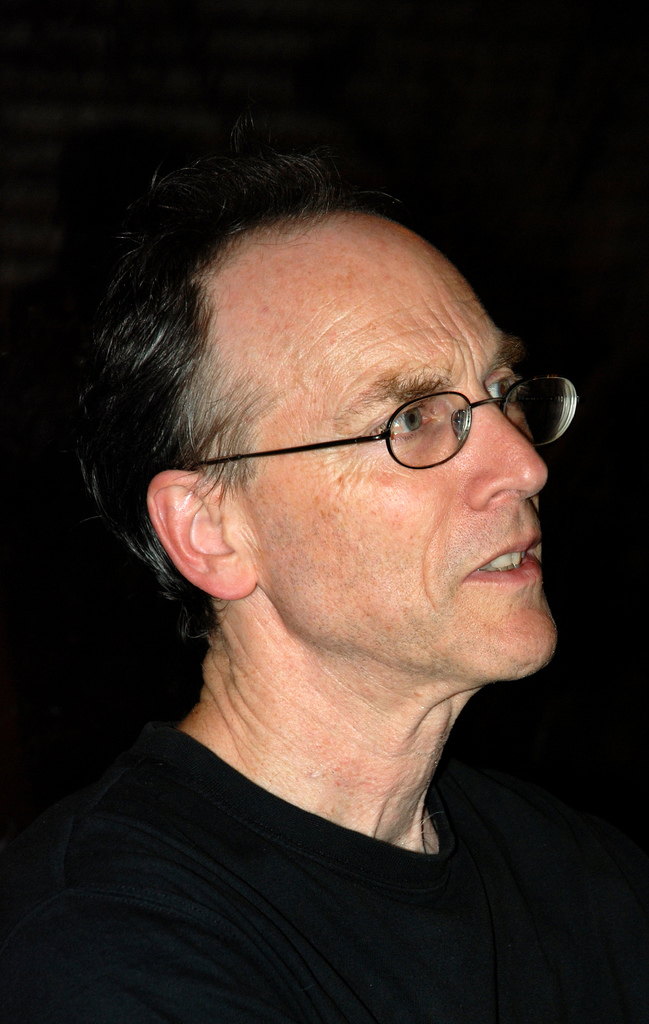
RēR founder, Chris Cutler, November 2007.

When English avant-rock group Henry Cow toured Europe between 1975 and 1977 they encountered many bands in a similar situation to their own: they were forced to operate outside the music industry that refused to recognise their music. In 1978 these groups got together and formed Rock in Opposition (RIO). To provide a record label and distribution network for these artists, Chris Cutler of Henry Cow and Nick Hobbes, Henry Cow's manager at the time, established Recommended Records (RēR) as a model for a non-profit music company. When RIO folded as an organisation in late 1979, RēR continued RIO's work by representing and promoting marginalised musicians and groups. RēR became a "virtual RIO", and "part of the continuing legacy of RIO".

Recommended Records grew from "Ré", a private record label in 1978 to "RēR Megacorp" in 1989, an independent record company with distributors worldwide. According to Chris Cutler, the label has consistently introduced new artists from around the world, many of whom might not otherwise have been able to release records, and has always put the artist first and commercial viability second.

=== Evolution of the name ===
When Henry Cow split up in 1978, Chris Cutler created a record label called Ré for his own projects with a distribution arm called Recommended Distribution, so called because he personally "recommended" the titles they distributed. The intention was to import and distribute new, interesting and experimental music from all over the world to the United Kingdom.

RéR Recommended logo, 1998.

In 1979, Cutler established the Recommended label for releases other than his own. In 1987, he combined the Ré and Recommended labels to form RēR, and at the same time Recommended Distribution became a worker's cooperative enabling Cutler to concentrate on running the RéR label and writing RēR's mail order catalogue. This arrangement worked for a few years, but in 1989, due to enormous unpaid debts from Recommended Distribution, Cutler was forced to restart his own distribution system again, and RēR became RēR/Recommended. Recommended Distribution went on to become These Records, an affiliated label. RēR/Recommended became known as RēR Megacorp with a website and online shopping facilities.

Just as Recommended Records's name evolved over the years, so did its logo.

== Imprints ==
Recommended Records has the following imprints:

- Points East – established to release experimental music from Central Europe
- Freedonia – established to release records by Půlnoc, formerly The Plastic People of the Universe
- Political Underground – established to release records by Unrest Work and Play
- Fred Records – dedicated to re-releasing the back catalogue of Fred Frith recordings plus previously unreleased material
- This is! – set up by Charles Hayward and Charles Bullen to re-release This Heat's back catalogue

== Affiliated labels ==
A distribution network of affiliated labels exists throughout the world to promote experimental, unusual and innovative music. While many of these labels are distinct operations, they share a common musical ethic. Some of these affiliated labels are:

- Ad Hoc Records – RēR USA label
- Locus Solus – Recommended Records Japan
- These Records – independent UK label and mail-order shop
- RecRec Music – RēR Switzerland, an independent Swiss label (no longer active)
- Review Records – ReRe Germany, an independent German label
- No Man's Land – an imprint of Review (ReRe) Records
- AYAA – Recommended France, an independent French label (no longer active)
- Cuneiform Records – US distributor of RēR, an independent US label

== Artists ==
These are some of the artists that have had music released or re-released on the Recommended Records label.

- 5uu's
- After Dinner
- AMM
- Paolo Angeli
- Arcane Device
- Art Bears
- Biota/Mnemonists
- Peter Blegvad
- Brainville 3
- Cassiber
- Lindsay Cooper
- Chris Cutler
- Peter Cusack
- Tod Dockstader
- Bob Drake
- Faust
- Janet Feder
- Fred Frith
- Lutz Glandien
- Light Coorporation
- Ground Zero
- Haco
- Hail
- Alfred Harth
- Henry Cow
- Tim Hodgkinson
- The Homosexuals
- Robert Iolini
- Kalahari Surfers
- Keep the Dog
- Boris Kovač
- Les 4 Guitaristes de l'Apocalypso-Bar
- Albert Marcoeur
- Elio Martusciello
- Massacre
- R. Stevie Moore
- The Necks
- News from Babel
- John Oswald
- P53
- Zeena Parkins
- Lesego Rampolokeng
- Jon Rose
- The Science Group
- Skeleton Crew
- Slapp Happy
- Sun Ra
- Richard Aaker Trythall
- Thinking Plague
- This Heat
- Jack Vees
- Charles Vrtacek
- When

== RēR compilations ==
- Various artists: Recommended Records Sampler (1982, 2xLP, Recommended Records)
- Various artists: Recommended Records Sampler (1982, EP, Recommended Records)
- Various artists: RēR Quarterly (1985–1997, LP/CD + magazine, Recommended Records)

== See also ==
- List of independent UK record labels
