= Nine Funerals of the Citizen King =

1973 avant-rock song written by Tim Hodgkinson for Henry Cow

Song by Henry Cow

from the album Legend
- Released: September 1973
- Recorded: May–June 1973
- Studio: The Manor, Oxfordshire, England
- Genre: Avant-rock
- Length: 5:34
- Label: Virgin
- Songwriter: Tim Hodgkinson
- Producer: Henry Cow

"Nine Funerals of the Citizen King" is a 1973 song written by Tim Hodgkinson for the English avant-rock group Henry Cow. It was recorded in May and June 1973 by Henry Cow, and released in September 1973 on their debut album, Legend by Virgin Records.

"Nine Funerals of the Citizen King" was Henry Cow's first political statement.

== Development ==
Hodgkinson wrote "Nine Funerals of the Citizen King" in early 1972. He said he composed the piece on a keyboard while he sang. He drew on several sources for the song texts, including Guy Debord's The Society of the Spectacle ("Down beneath the spectacle of free"), Gertrude Stein's "Rose is a rose is a rose is a rose" from her poem Sacred Emily, and Lewis Carroll's nonsense verse, The Hunting of the Snark ("That the Snark was a Boojum all can tell"). Hodgkinson had been reading material on situationism at the time, including works by Debord, Raoul Vaneigem and issues of the journal, Internationale Situationniste.

When Hodgkinson presented the composition to Henry Cow, all he had were lyrics and a vocal melody, accompanied by a keyboard. The band added harmony and counterpoints to complete the song. "Nine Funerals of the Citizen King" became part of group's live repertoire in 1972–1973, including featuring on the John Peel Show on 24 April 1973. The song was recorded at The Manor in Oxfordshire, England in May–June 1973, and released on Henry Cow's first album, Legend in September 1973.

"Nine Funerals of the Citizen King" was later remixed by Hodgkinson at Cold Storage Studios in London in 1990, and was released by East Side Digital Records on the first CD release of Legend in 1991. All subsequent CD releases of Legend by East Side Digital and Recommended Records restored the original mix. The remixed version of "Nine Funerals of the Citizen King" was also released in 2019 on Ex Box – Collected Fragments 1971–1978, a bonus CD given to subscribers of The Henry Cow Box Redux: The Complete Henry Cow.

== Composition and structure ==
Benjamin Piekut wrote in Henry Cow: The World Is a Problem that in contrast to Hodgkinson's previous compositions, the song-structure of "Nine Funerals of the Citizen King" introduces repetition, which prevents the music from "wandering without aim". Piekut said the song's texture is well defined: vocals accompanied by "simple chords" on an organ, with the addition later of violin, bass guitar, saxophone and drums.

Piekut described "Nine Funerals of the Citizen King" as a blend of Béla Bartók and Richard Wagner, and felt that the eight-measure "chorus", the "But a rose is a rose is a rose" refrain, has "some of the sweetest harmonic writing in the Henry Cow repertoire":

Hodgkinson casts a strange spell here by descending from B in the melody while simultaneously ascending from E in the bass with what should be the same pitches. On the third "rose" they cross at G-sharp with a surprising pentatonic chord that is reinforced by the top vocal line ... but sings on D-sharp above the C-sharp written in the middle voice. After the bass and melody intersect, however, the bass moves up to A instead of the A-sharp that had previously taken the melody down to the crossroads. This unadorned A permits a pivot to a simple D—E9—F-sharp progression that feels like a resolution because of the F-sharp suspension that had been hanging over the entire phrase from the beginning.

== Reception and interpretations ==
Matthew Martens wrote in Perfect Sound Forever that "Nine Funerals of the Citizen King" was Henry Cow's first political statement, and they sing "dourly (and cryptically) of the gulf separating democracy's pomp and spectacle from the real-life horrors of consumer capitalism." Piekut stated that Hodgkinson's "lyrical reference to Gertrude Stein in the arresting 'chorus' section" was a turning point in Henry Cow's approach when they moved from "a zany fascination with the historical avant-garde of Dada and surrealism" to "a more sober, Marxist analysis of contemporary society and a Brechtian relationship to artistic production." Paul Stump suggested in The Music's All that Matters: A History of Progressive Rock that Dadaism is still at the heart of the song: "Down beneath the spectacle of free" refers to Debord, and "Said the Mama of Dada as long ago as 1919" alludes to the year the movement was born in Zürich.

In The Billboard Guide to Progressive Music, Bradley Smith said Henry Cow delivers the song's "impossibly off-the-wall didactic lyrics" with "deadpan vocals". Paul Hegarty and Martin Halliwell wrote in Beyond and Before: Progressive Rock Since the 1960s that the manner in which the band performed the song "functioned as a critical take on 'the spectacle' of consumer society". They stated that song's texts draw on "Marx's critique of the commodity" and Debord's notion that "the then new phase of capitalism as that of the spectacle".

Commenting on the song some 36 years after he wrote it, Hodgkinson said, "the idea of 'the society of the spectacle' expressed ... a playful, theatrical, surrealist dimension which suggested montage and word games. This was no call to arms but a sort of basking in the childishness of alienated states."

== Personnel ==
- Tim Hodgkinson – voice, Farfisa organ, clarinet
- Fred Frith – voice, violin, acoustic guitar
- Geoff Leigh – saxophone, flute
- John Greaves – voice, bass guitar, fuzz bass
- Chris Cutler – voice, drums, tambourine

== Live performances ==
The only documented live performances of "Nine Funerals of the Citizen King" by Henry Cow are:

- July 1972 at the Traverse Theatre in Edinburgh.
- 24 April 1973 on the John Peel Show in London, a month before the song was recorded for Legend; broadcast by the BBC on 8 May 1973.
  - Released as "Citizen King" in Volume 1: Beginnings of The 40th Anniversary Henry Cow Box Set.

== Works cited ==
- Cutler, Chris, ed. (2009). "The Road: Volumes 1–5". The 40th Anniversary Henry Cow Box Set (box set booklet). Henry Cow. London: Recommended Records.
- Hegarty, Paul; Halliwell, Martin (2011). Beyond and Before: Progressive Rock Since the 1960s. London: Bloomsbury Publishing. ISBN 978-1-4411-1480-8.
- Piekut, Benjamin (2019). Henry Cow: The World Is a Problem. Duke University Press. ISBN 978-1-47800-405-9.
