= Pierre-Yves Plat =

French pianist (born 1980)

Pierre-Yves Plat (born 1980 in Paris) is a French pianist who reinterprets classical masterpieces into jazz, ragtime, boogie, salsa and disco.

== Biography ==
Pierre-Yves Plat started learning classical piano at the age of five with Marie-Claude Legrand. His personality and his innate sense of rhythm led him towards boogie-woogie, ragtime and stride, and then onto improvisation. He learnt with artists as diverse as Édouard Ferlet (Berklee Jazz Performance Award - 1992) and Fabrice Eulry, 'the Chopin of boogie'. It was at the instigation of Eulry that he recorded his first disk of ragtime and began to perform in concert.

He has since played in many venues in Paris (L'Archipel, salle Cortot, etc.), Versailles (Bagheera Piano Bar, the Montansier theatre) and throughout France, regularly participating in Jazz and Blues festivals (the 'Petit Journal' of St. Michel and Montparnasse, Lattitude Jazz Club, etc.). He was also involved in the musical animation of the famous Hotel George V, Paris. He now performs internationally, invited to play across Europe, from London to Albania.

His style is between classical and jazz, fusing the two with his reimaginings of the classics of Bach, Chopin and Mozart. His experimentations with the two forms came together in his first album, Pourquoi pas? ('Why not?'), in 2005. This album showcased the young musician's virtuosity, allying classical structures with rhythmic breakaways towards other musical styles. His talent for reinventing the classical form appealed to a wide audience, proving accessible to music lovers of all tastes as he merged different eras of music.

His second album, Récréations (2007), was a continuation of his unique style. With it came further success and recognition with appearances on M6 (TV channel), France's national television channel ('1945' and '100% Mag', February 2010). He has also provided the compositions and music arrangement for short films by Méliès (Fechner Production).
