= Beautiful as the Moon – Terrible as an Army with Banners =

1975 song written by Fred Frith and Chris Cutler for Henry Cow

Song by Henry Cow and Slapp Happy

from the album In Praise of Learning
- Released: 9 May 1975
- Recorded: February–March 1975
- Studio: The Manor, Oxfordshire, England
- Genre: Avant-rock
- Length: 7:02
- Label: Virgin
- Composer: Fred Frith
- Lyricist: Chris Cutler
- Producers: Henry Cow, Slapp Happy, Phil Becque

Official audio
- "Beautiful as the Moon; Terrible as an Army with Banners" on YouTube

"Beautiful as the Moon – Terrible as an Army with Banners" is a 1975 song composed by Fred Frith with lyrics by Chris Cutler for the English avant-rock group Henry Cow. It was recorded in February and March 1975 by Henry Cow and Slapp Happy, and released in May 1975 on their collaborative album, In Praise of Learning by Virgin Records.

A live version of the song, recorded for a Peel Session, at BBC Maida Vale Studio 4, on 5 August 1975, appears on the band's 1976 live album Concerts.

A jazz interpretation of "Beautiful as the Moon" was recorded by the Michel Edelin Quintet with spoken texts by John Greaves and released on their 2019 album, Echoes of Henry Cow.

== Development ==
"Beautiful as the Moon – Terrible as an Army with Banners" began as a composition by Frith after Henry Cow and Slapp Happy started collaborating in 1974. While Henry Cow were touring with Captain Beefheart in May–June 1974, Frith toyed with the "distinctive rhythmic profile" of the phrase "No Sun No Birds". (Note: Frith took the phrase "No Birds" from the last line of a poem by Beefheart, "One Nest Rolls After Another", which was printed on the back of the LP sleeve of his 1971 album, Mirror Man. Frith also used "No Birds" as the title of the last track on his 1974 solo album, Guitar Solos.) He completed the composition on a piano near the end of the Beefheart tour in the Netherlands; included in the piece was a vamp of Frith's that Henry Cow had played in their Rainbow Theatre concert in October 1973. Frith asked Cutler if he could write lyrics for his composition and turn it into a song; Cutler produced verse that matched the themes of In Praise of Learning's two other songs. Cutler said those were the first song texts he had written, and the piece was the first writing collaboration between Frith and Cutler, which later became Art Bears.

"Beautiful as the Moon" became the longest lasting "building block" Henry Cow used in subsequent live performances. Piekut said, along with Tim Hodgkinson's "Living in the Heart of the Beast", they were "big cornerstones of [their] live set" at the time. In concert Henry Cow often interrupted the song during its instrumental section and played Frith's "Nirvana for Mice" followed by other pieces before returning to the song's final section later in the set. The band also performed the middle and final sections of the song with The Orckestra in 1977.

The title of "Beautiful as the Moon – Terrible as an Army with Banners" comes from a line in the Bible's Song of Solomon: "Who is she that looketh forth as the morning, fair as the moon, clear as the sun, and terrible as an army with banners?" One of Henry Cow's live performances of this song was released in The 40th Anniversary Henry Cow Box Set as "Fair as the Moon" / "Terrible as an Army with Banners", matching the Song of Solomon's text.

== Composition and structure ==
Frith scored "Beautiful as the Moon – Terrible as an Army with Banners" for piano, bass guitar and percussion. Piekut writes, in his 2019 book Henry Cow: The World Is a Problem, that the piece differs from Frith's other compositions for Henry Cow in that the metre changes less frequently and he does not deploy counterpoint. Instead he uses a melody with long note values and a "clear and unified texture" to emphasise Dagmar Krause's voice. Frith's piano line meanders, but has a fixed eighth-note pulse, accompanied by John Greaves' bass guitar and Cutler's percussion, which is mostly cymbals and bass drum signalling bass note changes, rather than a steady beat.

Piekut described the first three verses of the song, which includes the "No Sun No Birds" vamp, as having a "distinctive rhythmic profile", characterised by the bass guitar's E and B notes. In the next section, the two verses beginning "Last days ...", Frith deploys a "lyrical, diatonic vocal melody" which, Piekut says, "could have been written by Weill in an alternate universe". What follows is an instrumental break that begins with a vamp of "chordal pattern that mixes major and minor modes and reestablishes intensity through repetition". This slowly fades and is replaced by an open improvisation passage of overdubbed pianos. (Note: During live performances of the song, the piano improvisation was replaced by an organ and oboe melody Frith wrote for Hodgkinson and Lindsay Cooper, which was accompanied by Frith on improvised guitar.) The song then concludes with a final verse, returning to the "Rose Dawn" theme at the end of the first section with variations on the text.

Piekut writes that Cutler's lyrics in the song are "[e]xtremely dense with mythological figures and poetic turns of phrase". Cutler draws on the Christian apocalypse and its parallels to communist revolution. He uses images of death and ghosts "to portray a haunted world of lies" and "the crimes of economic exploitation and linguistic reification". The song concludes with turning talk into action ("Time solves words—by deeds"), and ending the old order and beginning the new ("Let Ends Begin"). Paul Hegarty and Martin Halliwell write, in Beyond and Before: Progressive Rock Since the 1960s, that the lyrics avoid "populist demagoguery" by emphasising the road to revolution and the need for "the oppressed" to recognise society's flaws. They state that Krause's "note-shifting vocals complete the song's Brechtian didactic model".

== Personnel ==
- Dagmar Krause (credited as "Dagmar") – voice
- Fred Frith – piano, guitar
- Tim Hodgkinson – Farfisa organ
- John Greaves – bass guitar
- Chris Cutler – drums
- Phil Becque – noises (oscillator)

== Reception ==
Writing in Perfect Sound Forever, Matthew Martens called "Beautiful as the Moon – Terrible as an Army with Banners" as "epic", while Roger Trenwith, in a review of The Henry Cow Box Redux: The Complete Henry Cow, described the song, along with Hodgkinson's "Living in the Heart of the Beast", as "artworks of consummate skill" that are "probably the apogee of [Henry Cow]".

In a review of In Praise of Learning in New Musical Express, music critic Ian MacDonald called "Beautiful as the Moon" a "disassociated marching-song" that "works desolately well", but was critical of Cutler's "excess[ive]" lyrics. Glenn Kenny wrote in Trouser Press that the song would be "excellent" if it were not for the lyrics. Kenny felt that "concepts this cerebral defy the anthemic spirit the band so clearly wants to evoke." In a review of Henry Cow's live album Concerts in All About Jazz, Brad Glanden described Krause's voice on "Beautiful as the Moon" as "majestic", "terrifying" and "so engaging" that the song's "cringeworthy lyrics ... can be forgiven".

Philip Clark wrote in The Wire that the song's "stripped back instrumental texture" and its emphasis on the lyrics "planted seeds that grew into The Art Bears". Greaves later described "Beautiful as the Moon – Terrible as an Army with Banners" as "a vocal piece which was neither opera, nor rock, nor song, nor anything else ... It was fabulous. It was fresh and new, and nobody had ever done it."

== Live performances ==
"Beautiful as the Moon – Terrible as an Army with Banners" was performed live by Henry Cow a number of times between 1975 and 1977, including:

- May 1975 during their European tour with Robert Wyatt
- 5 August 1975 on the John Peel Show in London; broadcast by the BBC on 18 August 1975
  - Released as two tracks, "Beautiful as the Moon – Terrible as an Army with Banners" and "Beautiful as the Moon (Reprise)" on Concerts
- 26 March 1976 at the NDR Jazz Workshop in Hamburg, Germany
  - Released as two tracks, "Fair as the Moon" and "Terrible as an Army with Banners" in Volume 3: Hamburg of The 40th Anniversary Henry Cow Box Set
- 25 August 1976 in Vevey, Switzerland for the Swiss TV program, Kaleidospop
  - Released as two tracks, "Beautiful As ..." and "Terrible As ..." on DVD in Volume 10: Vevey of The 40th Anniversary Henry Cow Box Set, the only known video recording of Henry Cow
- 18 November 1976 in Nancy, France
- 13 March 1977 in London with the Orckestra

== Works cited ==
- Cutler, Chris, ed. (2009). "The Road: Volumes 1–5". The 40th Anniversary Henry Cow Box Set (box set booklet). Henry Cow. London: Recommended Records.
- Hegarty, Paul; Halliwell, Martin (2011). Beyond and Before: Progressive Rock Since the 1960s. London: Bloomsbury Publishing. ISBN 978-1-4411-1480-8.
- Piekut, Benjamin (2019). Henry Cow: The World Is a Problem. Duke University Press. ISBN 978-1-47800-405-9.
