= Kew. Rhone. =

Studio album by John Greaves and Peter Blegvad
- Released: March 1977
- Recorded: October 1976
- Studio: Grog Kill Studio, Woodstock, New York
- Genre: Progressive rock; jazz fusion; Canterbury sound; art rock
- Length: 36:43
- Label: Virgin (UK); Europa (US); Voiceprint Records; Le Chant du Monde

John Greaves and Peter Blegvad chronology
Kew. Rhone. (1977)	Unearthed (1995)

Kew. Rhone. (Note: The album title includes a full stop after each word.) is a concept album by British bass guitarist and composer John Greaves, and American singer-songwriter and guitarist Peter Blegvad. It is a song cycle composed by Greaves with lyrics by Blegvad, and was performed by Greaves and Blegvad with vocalist Lisa Herman and others. The album was recorded in Woodstock, New York in October 1976, and was released in the UK in March 1977 by Virgin Records, credited on the front cover to "John Greaves, Peter Blegvad and Lisa Herman", but on the record label as "John Greaves and Peter Blegvad". It was issued in the US in 1978 by Europa Records.

Blegvad's lyrics on Kew. Rhone. are filled with "anagrams, palindromes and other verbal games".

An enhanced CD version of Kew. Rhone., issued by Voiceprint Records in 1998, included an interactive multimedia track entitled "Kew. Rom.". The album was a critical success, but failed commercially; AllMusic called it "an unfortunately neglected masterpiece of '70s progressive rock."

== Background ==
John Greaves, from the English avant-rock group Henry Cow, and Peter Blegvad, from the German/English avant-pop trio Slapp Happy, first worked together during the merger of the two groups in England in 1974. Slapp Happy and Henry Cow recorded their first collaboration album, Desperate Straights in late 1974, and the song "Bad Alchemy" from the album was Greaves and Blegvad's first collaborative songwriting effort. After the two groups recorded their second album, In Praise of Learning in early 1975, the merger ended and Blegvad moved to New York City. There Blegvad spent the rest of the year earning a living as an illustrator, which included drawing backgrounds for Peanuts animated films. In March 1976 Greaves left Henry Cow and joined Blegvad in New York City to start work on Kew. Rhone. Virgin Records, Henry Cow and Slapp Happy's record label at the time, funded the project. Greaves had begun composing fragments of the song suite in 1974 while still with Henry Cow. The song "Kew. Rhone." evolved from a piece Greaves wrote called "York" that was performed by Henry Cow in the early 1970s, but never recorded.

Greaves and Blegvad spent three months working on Greaves's compositions. Blegvad wrote "surreal" lyrics that were filled with "anagrams, palindromes and other verbal games", and illustrated them with explanatory pictures and diagrams that later appeared on the album's record sleeve, "to be used in conjunction with the words". Some of the songs on the album are not fully comprehensible without reference to these pictures. At the time Blegvad had begun experimenting with cartooning, an activity that later led to him doing a weekly comic strip for The Independent on Sunday called Leviathan, and he was fascinated with the relationship between text and image.

Blegvad said that he and Greaves deliberately created a gap between the words and the music to make the album more interesting. "To [understand] the words you almost have to stop the record and read them, referring to the illustrations on the sleeve." Blegvad also said in an interview that he created experimental and confusing lyrics as a way of coming to terms with Greaves's complicated music, which he found difficult to play.

When Kew. Rhone. was ready to record, jazz musicians Michael Mantler and Carla Bley offered the use of their Grog Kill Studio in Woodstock, New York. Mantler and Bley also played on the album, along with avant-garde jazz drummer Andrew Cyrille, vocalist Lisa Herman and others. Virgin Records released "Kew. Rhone." in the UK in March 1977.

Greaves and Blegvad next worked together on each other's solo albums, Greaves' Accident (1982) and Blegvad's The Naked Shakespeare (1983), but did not record an album under their names again until Unearthed in 1995. They also participated in several bands together, including The Lodge (1987–1989) and The Peter Blegvad Trio (with Chris Cutler).

== Kew. Rhone. ==
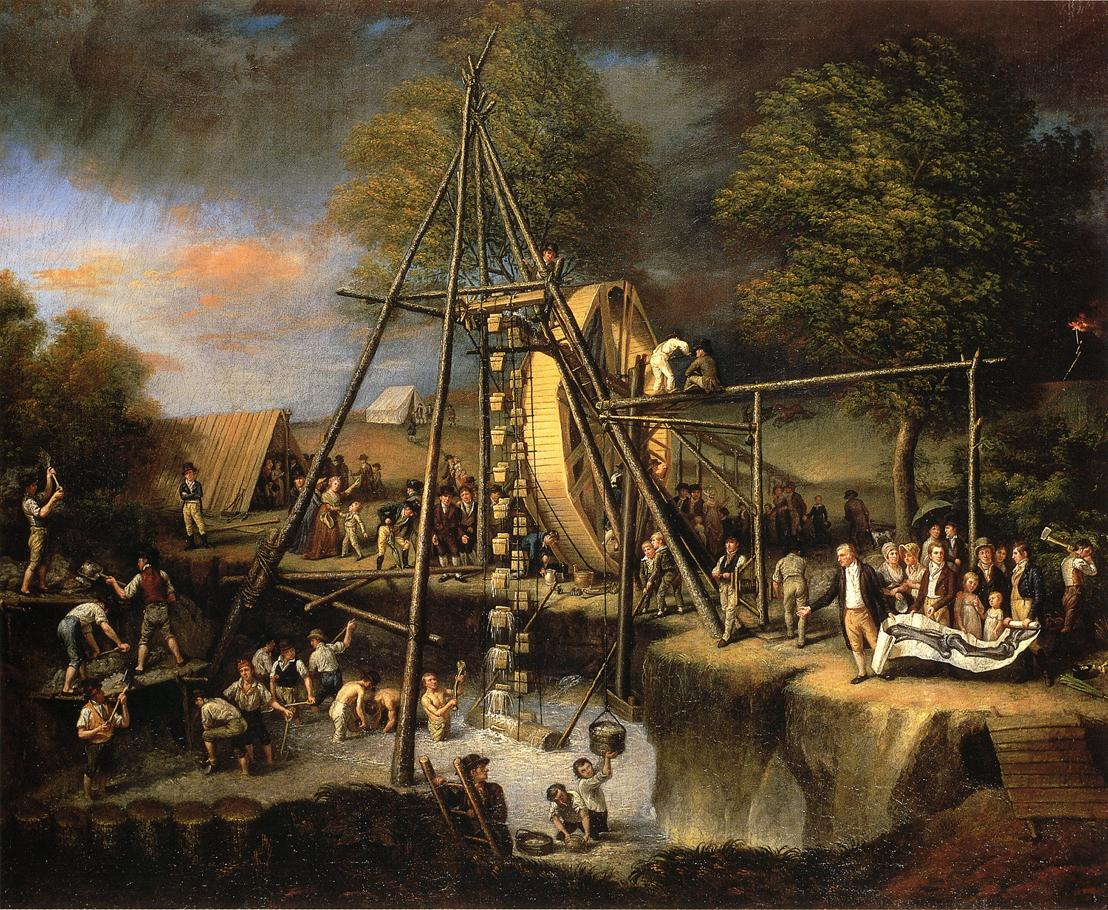
Charles Willson Peale's painting, Exhuming the First American Mastodon (1806), used on the album cover and the subject of the track "Seven Scenes ...".

The album cover is a reproduction of a painting by Charles Willson Peale entitled Exhuming the First American Mastodon (1806–1808). The song it illustrates, "Seven Scenes from the Painting 'Exhuming the First American Mastodon' by C. W. Peale" interprets the painting with, according to Peter Blegvad, "a brazen disregard for the painter's original intent." It is a song about "the perils of being named or defined" and describes a world in which "definition is acquired as liberty is lost". This "naming" is referred to again in the Romanian proverb, "Names are not the pledge for things, but the things for names" that appears in the song "Twenty-Two Proverbs".

The title track, "Kew. Rhone." is divided into two parts: the first is composed entirely of anagrams of the title, while the second builds up to a palindrome, "Peel's foe, not a set animal, laminates a tone of sleep." "Peel" is C. W. Peale and the "foe" is the mastodon. The animal is not "set" because it is enjoying the attention of its excavators, and it is probably "the tusker's finest hour".

In "Pipeline", set to a bossa nova, a lady and two gentlemen pondering the implications of a dug-up pipeline. The first three "verses" of the lyrics are:

Figure A.
Here are two gentlemen and a lady contemplating a length of dug-up pipeline.

"Pipeline"
The first 30 seconds of "Pipeline" illustrating Peter Blegvad's "surreal" lyrics.

Figure B. illustrates the assertion —
"ambiguity can't be measured like a change of temperature"

Figure C. consists of a list of assorted equipage.
A gentleman imagines how the items on the list would look if only part exhumed (he thinks they wouldn't look unlike a length of pipe).

== Amateur's Pamphlet on Kew. Rhone. ==
Almost eight years after the release of the album Peter Blegvad wrote a pamphlet on Kew. Rhone. under the moniker "the editors of Amateur". It was published in the May 1985 issue of RēR Quarterly. Amateur is an online "publication" edited by Blegvad, and is a collection of his writing and art.

In the pamphlet Blegvad provides additional information on Kew. Rhone. and the song texts. It includes the lyrics to the songs, the record sleeve artwork, plus additional artwork and diagrams related to the songs. The pamphlet also includes the lyrics of "Frenzy", an outtake from the Kew. Rhone. recording sessions that did not appear on the album. The song, which describes Peale's painting, is analysed here by Blegvad. "Frenzy" was released in May 1982 by Recommended Records on their Sampler EP.

== Reception and influences ==
Professional ratings
Review scores
Source	Rating
AllMusic	4.5/5 stars
Babyblaue Seiten	11/15

Kew. Rhone. was a critical success, but failed commercially because of the "anti-intellectual zeitgeist of late 70s England", and the fact that it was released on the same day, and on the same label, as the Sex Pistols's Never Mind the Bollocks, Here's the Sex Pistols.

Music critic Stewart Mason of AllMusic called Kew. Rhone. "an unfortunately neglected masterpiece of '70s progressive rock." He described the album as "a brilliant amalgam of Slapp Happy's skewed pop sense, the collective improvisation approach of Henry Cow, the sly wit of the Canterbury prog rock scene" and said it is "a challenging but surprisingly accessible album that rewards as much attention as the listener offers it."

In a review on BBC Online, Peter Marsh called the album "one of the great lost albums of the seventies", saying that it is "surreal, infuriating, complex and silly in just about equal parts." English musician Robert Wyatt reportedly liked it so much that he bought two copies of the LP "just in case the first got worn out!"

John Greaves later recorded two songs from the album, "Kew. Rhone." (with Robert Wyatt singing) and "Gegenstand" for his 1994 solo album, Songs. In May 2008 Kew. Rhone. was performed live in its entirety for the first time in 31 years since its original release at Les Abattoirs in Bourgoin-Jallieu, France. The full line-up was: John Greaves (piano, vocals), Peter Blegvad (vocals, computer), Lisa Herman (vocals), Jef Morin (guitar), David Lewis (trumpet, flugelhorn), Daniel Yvinec (bass), Simon Goubert (drums) and Cecile Bohler (additional vocals).

== Kew. Rhone. book ==
In 2014, Uniformbooks published a book about the album, written by Blegvad and edited and designed in collaboration with publisher Colin Sackett. It includes contributions by Amy Beal, Carla Bley, Franklin Bruno, Sheridan Coakley, Jonathan Coe, Jane Colling, Andrew Cyrille, François Ducat, John Greaves, Doug Harvey, Lisa Herman, Jeff Hoke, Dana Johnson, Andrew Joron, Glenn Kenny, Frank Key, Simon Lucas, Karen Mantler, Harry Mathews, Tanya Peixoto, Benjamin Piekut, Margit Rosen, Philip Tagney, Robert Wyatt, Rafi Zabor and Siegfried Zielinski.

"...its authors and some of its connoisseurs have broken silence to discuss the record and to reflect upon the times in which it and they themselves were forged. Peter Blegvad, Kew. Rhone.’s lyricist and illustrator, excavates each song in turn, uncovering themes and sources. In the second part of the book, a consortium of writers and artists respond to the album in various ways, illuminating without dispelling the mystery of a work designed to resist interpretation even as it invites it." In February 2015 Blegvad was interviewed by Marcus O'Dair about the book.

== Track listing ==
All tracks composed by John Greaves with lyrics by Peter Blegvad.

=== Side one ===
1. "Good Evening" – 0:33
2. "Twenty-Two Proverbs" – 4:06
3. "Seven Scenes from the Painting 'Exhuming the First American Mastodon' by C. W. Peale" – 3:32
4. "Kew. Rhone." – 3:04
5. "Pipeline" – 3:39
6. "Catalogue of Fifteen Objects and Their Titles" – 3:35

=== Side two ===
1. "One Footnote (to Kew. Rhone.)" – 1:29
2. "Three Tenses Onanism" – 4:06
3. "Nine Mineral Emblems" – 5:51
4. "Apricot" – 3:04
5. "Gegenstand" – 3:44

=== Bonus track on 1998 enhanced CD ===
1. "Kew. Rom." (interactive multimedia track)

=== Bonus tracks on 2004 CD re-issue ===
1. "Lisa, Peter & John practice 'Bad Alchemy'... (demo)"
2. "...and almost get it right (demo)"

== Personnel ==
- John Greaves – piano, organ, bass guitar, vocals, percussion ("One Footnote")
- Peter Blegvad – vocals, guitars, tenor saxophone ("Pipeline")
- Lisa Herman – vocals

=== Guests ===
- Andrew Cyrille – drum, percussion
- Michael Mantler – trumpet, trombone
- Carla Bley – vocals, tenor saxophone ("One Footnote", "Good Evening")
- Michael A. Levine – violin, viola, vocals ("Nine Mineral Emblems")
- Vito Rendace – alto and tenor saxophones, flute
- April Lang – vocals ("Pipeline", "Three Tenses Onanism")
- Dana Johnson – vocals ("Twenty Two Proverbs")
- Boris Kinberg – claves ("Pipeline")

=== Production ===
- Engineering by Michael Mantler
- Interactive multimedia track "Kew. Rom." produced by Les Corsaires and Voiceprint
- Coordination and concept by François Ducat
- Programming by Denis Thiriar
- Image manipulations by Serge G.
- Artistic contributions from Peter Blegvad

== CD re-issues ==
- In 1991 Virgin Records re-issued Kew. Rhone. on CD.
- In 1998 Voiceprint Records issued an enhanced CD version of Kew. Rhone. with an added interactive multimedia track, "Kew. Rom." that includes background information, interviews with people who made the album, alternate versions of two of the songs and an unreleased track.
- In 2004 Le Chant du Monde re-issued Kew. Rhone. with two bonus (demo) tracks.

== Works cited ==
- Blegvad, Peter (1 May 1985). "Amateur's Pamphlet on Kew. Rhone.". RēR Quarterly. Vol. 1, no. 1. London: November Books. pp. 18–30..
- Piekut, Benjamin (2019). Henry Cow: The World Is a Problem. Duke University Press. ISBN 978-1-47800-405-9.
