= Leviathan (comics) =

Leviathan, in comics, may refer to:

- Leviathan, an alias used by Legion of Super-Heroes member Gim Allon
- Leviathan (Marvel Comics), a fictional Soviet-based terrorist organization
- Leviathan (DC Comics), a criminal organization run by Batman villain Talia al Ghul in Batman Inc. and Batman Incorporated
- Leviathan (2000 AD), a story from 2000 AD
- Leviathan (comic strip), a British comic strip from the Independent on Sunday
- Leviathan, the original alias of Marvel Comics character Edward Cobert, better known as Gargantua
- Leviathan, a Marvel Comics character who appeared in Nick Fury, Agent of S.H.I.E.L.D.
