= Echoes of Henry Cow =

2019 studio album by Michel Edelin Quintet with John Greaves

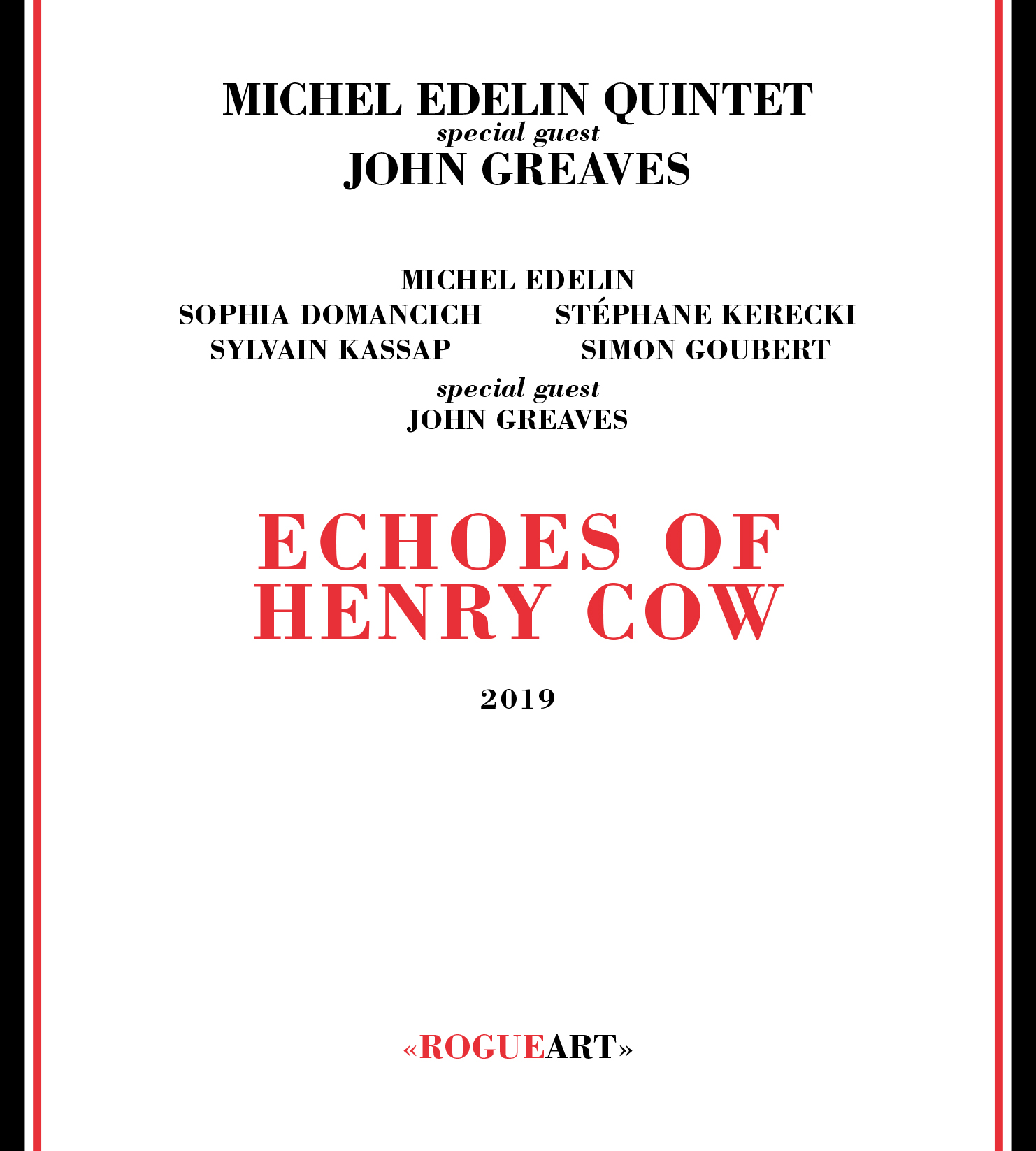

Studio album by Michel Edelin Quintet with John Greaves
- Released: 10 May 2019
- Recorded: 17 and 18 September 2018
- Studio: Studio Sextan, La Fonderie, Malakoff, France
- Genre: Avant-garde jazz
- Length: 57:24
- Language: English
- Label: RogueArt
- Producer: Michel Dorbon

Echoes of Henry Cow is a 2019 studio album by French jazz group, the Michel Edelin Quintet, with narration by English musician John Greaves. It comprises variations on Henry Cow compositions and other music, including by Art Bears and Edelin. The album was released by French record label RogueArt on 10 May 2019.

Aymeric Leroy of Calyx, The Canterbury Music Website wrote in the album's liner notes that it should not be seen as a Henry Cow tribute album, but rather "echoes (much transformed during its long journey through time, space, memory and the mysterious twists and turns of the creative process) in [Edelin's] own musical inner world".

== Background ==
Henry Cow was a 1968–1978 English experimental rock group, and Art Bears, formed in early 1978, was its successor. Greaves was Henry Cow's bass guitarist from 1969 to 1976. Edelin's quintet includes two musicians with progressive rock backgrounds, namely Simon Goubert from the French progressive rock group Magma, and Sophia Domancich with Canterbury scene connections.

Edelin and Henry Cow first crossed paths when they shared the same bill at the Nancy Jazz Pulsations festival in Nancy, France in 1975. Edelin is said to have been "impressed" by Henry Cow's performance.

After the release of Echoes of Henry Cow, the Michel Edelin Quintet promoted the album at several jazz festivals. These included performances at Like a Jazz Machine in Dudelange in Luxembourg on 18 May 2019, at Jazz À Cours Et À Jardin in Oullins in France on 15 June 2019, and at Nancy Jazz Pulsations on 18 October 2019.

== Reception ==
In a review of Echoes of Henry Cow at Citizen Jazz, Denis Desassis wrote that Edelin's quintet makes no attempt to reproduce Henry Cow's music, but rather revives it 40 years after its creation using their own language of contemporary jazz. In addition to drawing on the works of Henry Cow and Art Bears, the album also contains two Edelin compositions, illustrating the impact their music had on him. Desassis said that only after repeated listening does it become clear how well the quintet handled Henry Cow's unclassifiable music.

A reviewer at Avant Music News noted the influence Henry Cow had on Edelin's music and said the album reflects this. Rather than being a tribute album, it is "a reimagining of sorts"; Henry Cow's "crushing avant-rock with its dense compositions and free-formed improv" is replaced by Edelin's "more relaxed yet technical challenging ... modern creative jazz." But just as Henry Cow's music is "stubbornly independent", Echoes also follows a similar path. The reviewer stated that it took him "nearly six months ... to finally realize and fully appreciate the beauty and appropriateness of Edelin’s approach."

== Track listing ==
All texts by Chris Cutler, except "War" by Peter Blegvad; all arrangements by Michel Edelin.

No.	Title	Writer(s)	Length
1.	"Half the Sky"	Lindsay Cooper, Tim Hodgkinson	6:25
2.	"Living in the Heart of the Beast"	Hodgkinson	8:01
3.	"War"	Anthony Moore, Peter Blegvad	4:32
4.	"After the Flood"	Michel Edelin	2:42
5.	"Nursery"	Edelin	4:12
6.	"Ruins"	Fred Frith	10:11
7.	"Beautiful as the Moon"	Frith, Chris Cutler	8:08
8.	"The Bath of Stars"	Frith, Cutler	2:33
9.	"Civilisation"	Frith, Cutler	8:27
10.	"On Suicide"	Bertolt Brecht, Hanns Eisler adapted by Frith, Cutler	1:34
Total length:			57:24

Source: CD liner notes, Discogs.

== Personnel ==
- Michel Edelin Quintet
  - Michel Edelin – flute, alto flute, bass flute
  - Sophia Domancich – piano, Fender Rhodes
  - Sylvain Kassap – clarinet, bass clarinet
  - Stéphane Kerecki – double bass
  - Simon Goubert – drums
- Guest
  - John Greaves – spoken words

=== Production and artwork ===
- Recorded and mixed at Studio Sextan, La Fonderie, Malakoff, France by Vincent Mahey
- Mastered at L’Autre Studio, Vaires-sur-Marne, France by Jean-Pierre Bouquet
- Aymeric Leroy – liner notes
- RogueArt – photographs
- Max Schoendorff – cover design
- David Bourguignon – cover realization
- Michel Dorbon – executive producer

Source: CD liner notes, Discogs.
