= The Orckestra =

English avant-garde jazz and rock group

Background information
- Origin: London, England
- Genres: Avant-garde jazz, avant-rock, experimental music
- Years active: 1977–1978
- Label: Recommended
- Spinoff of: Henry Cow; Mike Westbrook Brass Band
- Past members: Fred Frith; Tim Hodgkinson; Chris Cutler; Lindsay Cooper; Dagmar Krause; Georgie Born; Mike Westbrook; Kate Westbrook; Dave Chambers; Paul Rutherford; Phil Minton; Frankie Armstrong

The Orckestra were a 12-piece English avant-garde jazz and avant-rock ensemble formed in March 1977 with the merger of avant-rock group Henry Cow, the Mike Westbrook Brass Band and folk singer Frankie Armstrong. (Note: At their debut performance the ensemble were presented as "Henry Cow/Mike Westbrook Occasional Orchestra and Big Band, Featuring Frankie Armstrong"; they later shortened their name to "The Orckestra".) They gave two performances in London in March and June 1977, and then embarked on two tours of Europe between September 1977 and May 1978, where they performed in Italy, France and Sweden.

== History ==
Henry Cow and the Mike Westbrook Brass Band crossed paths several times before they merged in 1977. Westbrook was one of the guests at Henry Cow's Rainbow Theatre concert with Faust in London in October 1973, and the Brass Band played for the audience in the foyer of the auditorium before the concert began. At the November 1975 Sigma Festival in Bordeaux, France, Henry Cow and the Brass Band performed in different parts of the same building, and at the end of Henry Cow's set, the Brass Band played a New Orleans funeral march from the audience while the members of Henry Cow danced together on stage. Then in October 1976, Henry Cow, the Mike Westbrook Brass Band and folk singer Frankie Armstrong performed different sets on the same bill at Goldsmith College in New Cross, London.

When they appeared on the same bill again on 13 March 1977, this time at the Moving Left Revue at The Roundhouse in London, Henry Cow, the Brass Band and Armstrong decided to merge and gave their debut performance. The Moving Left Revue was a Communist Party benefit concert that the Brass Band's Paul Rutherford had helped to organise. Steve Lake of the British music newspaper, Melody Maker described the three-hour concert as "a great success", and said that this merger was the "most exciting" of Henry Cow's succession of projects. Their drummer, Chris Cutler said that they had always wanted the explore the potential of an orchestra, and their "ideological common ground" made a cooperative venture inevitable.

On 26 June 1977 the Orckestra performed at the Open Air Theatre in Regent's Park. Reviewing the event in The Guardian, Ronald Atkins wrote that he was impressed by how wide-ranging the ensemble's music was, which, he said, "could hardly be equalled by any other group". In September 1977 they embarked on a three-month tour of Europe where they played at Milan and Modena in Italy, and at Nancy and Paris in France. In March 1978 the Orckestra returned to Europe where they played in Stockholm, Norrköping and Gothenburg in Sweden, Oslo in Norway, and Paris, Nancy, Longlaville, Loos-en-Gohelle, Poitiers, Orléans and Bordeaux in France.

While Henry Cow enjoyed playing in the Orckestra, the merger was not without its problems. The Brass Band had difficulty coming to terms with Henry Cow's irregular rhythms. Westbrook said, "In jazz, because of its origins in dance, we always have a pulse to relate to", but Henry Cow's approach "is totally alien to our way of writing and thinking about music." As a result, the ensemble's concerts tended to be dominated by Brass Band material, with a few selected Henry Cow pieces the group could perform. Atkins wrote that at the Regent's Park event, "the group sounded rather like the Westbrook band augmented by a rhythm section." The lack of rehearsal time also affected the ensemble's performances, and there was never enough time for the Brass Band to learn Henry Cow's work. No new material was written for the group, although Henry Cow and Rutherford did collaborate on some arrangements for it to perform. The Orckestra's last concert was on 24 May 1978 in Bordeaux, France, after which they decided to disband. Georgie Born and Lindsay Cooper from Henry Cow, however, continued to collaborate with Westbrook for several more years.

== Music ==
The Orckestra did not generate any new material, and generally performed pieces that the Mike Westbrook Brass Band, Henry Cow and Frankie Armstrong performed individually. At their debut performance at the Roundhouse, their set list was:

- "Wheel of Fortune"
- "Beautiful as the Moon..."
- "Django"
- "God Bless the Child"
- "Naima"
- "Mourn not the Dead"
- "Anthem"
- "Jackie-ing"
- "On Suicide"
- "Lady Howard's Coach"
- "Kanonensong"
- "Santiago, You are Suffering"
- "Let the Slave"
- "Serpent Maigre"
- "Bartlemy Fair"
- "The Saucy Sailor"
- "Little Duke Arthur's Nurse"
- "Sovay, Sovay"
- "Jack the Lad"
- "Holy Thursday"
- "I See Thy Form"
- "Alabama Song"

Henry Cow later incorporated some of the Brass Band pieces into their own sets, for example, "Jackie-ing" which appears on Volume 9: Late in The 40th Anniversary Henry Cow Box Set (2009).

== Recordings ==
No recordings of the Orckestra were released during their lifetime. A live album of extracts from their 20 November 1977 Paris concert at the Fête du Nouveau Populaire in the Hippodrome was planned, but was abandoned when it was discovered that the recording was sub-standard and that it had been premixed. A bootleg recording of this concert was released in 2003, but its sound quality has been reported as being poor.

The first officially released recording of the Orckestra appeared in 2006 when a 12-minute 3" CD single, "Unreleased Orckestra Extract" was given to subscribers of the Henry Cow Box. It contained an untitled piece by Fred Frith and "Would You Prefer Us to Lie?" by Chris Cutler and John Greaves, both taken from some of the Orckestra's live performances in Europe in March–May 1978. The two pieces were later reissued on Ex Box – Collected Fragments 1971–1978, a bonus CD given to subscribers of The Henry Cow Box Redux: The Complete Henry Cow (2019).

== Members ==
- Henry Cow
  - Fred Frith – guitar
  - Tim Hodgkinson – organ, alto saxophone, clarinet
  - Chris Cutler – drums
  - Lindsay Cooper – bassoon, flute, oboe
  - Dagmar Krause – vocals
  - Georgie Born – bass guitar, cello
- Mike Westbrook Brass Band
  - Mike Westbrook – piano, euphonium
  - Kate Westbrook – piccolo, tenor horn
  - Dave Chambers – soprano and tenor saxophone
  - Paul Rutherford – trombone, euphonium
  - Phil Minton – vocals, trumpet
- Frankie Armstrong – vocals

== Discography ==
=== Singles ===
- "Unreleased Orckestra Extract" (3" CD single, 2006, Recommended Records, UK) – a bonus CD given to subscribers of the Henry Cow Box (2006).

=== Bootlegs ===
- Live in Paris, November 20, 1977 (2xCD, 2003, Hickory, Japan)

== Works cited ==
- Cutler, Chris (2006). Concerts (CD booklet). Henry Cow. London: Recommended Records.
- Piekut, Benjamin (2019). Henry Cow: The World Is a Problem. Duke University Press. ISBN 978-1-47800-405-9.
