= The Lodge (band) =

- Origin: New York City, United States
- Genre: Art rock
- Instruments: Keyboards, Drums, Bass, Guitars, Vocals, Brass, Piano
- Years active: 1987–1989
- Labels: Island Records, Resurgence
- Past members: Peter Blegvad; John Greaves; Jakko Jakszyk; Anton Fier; Kristoffer Blegvad; Lisa Herman

The Lodge were a 1980s British/Welsh/American art rock band based in New York City, but performing mainly in Europe, which briefly united members of Henry Cow, Slapp Happy, Art Bears and Golden Palominos (among others). It was centred primarily around Peter Blegvad and John Greaves, and drew strongly on their previous collaborations and projects (most notably the Kew. Rhone. album).

== Roots (Henry Cow, Kew. Rhone. etc) ==
Following his ejection from Henry Cow in 1975, Blegvad had returned to New York City to work in cartoons (most notably as a background scene artist for Peanuts). Soon after this, he renewed his musical association with Henry Cow bass player John Greaves, and the pair linked up with singer/pianist Lisa Herman. The result was the Kew. Rhone. album, released on Island Records in 1977 and credited to John Greaves/Peter Blegvad/Lisa Herman. This was a dense and detailed song cycle with music by Greaves, lyrics by Blegvad and contributions by Woodstock jazz musicians Carla Bley, Andrew Cyrille and Michael Mantler. Described as "a brilliant amalgam of Slapp Happy's skewed pop sense, the collective improvisation approach of Henry Cow, the sly wit of the Canterbury prog rock scene, and (most fruitfully) Carla Bley's inimitably skewed progressive jazz", Kew. Rhone. was very well received by critics and musicians alike. (Robert Wyatt reportedly bought two copies in case he wore out his original copy with enthusiastic replaying.) However, it was not followed up by an immediate sequel, although the participants stayed in touch.

Returning to England in 1982, Blegvad cut the albums The Naked Shakespeare and Knights Like These, both of which featured ex-64 Spoons guitarist Jakko Jakszyk. Greaves co-wrote three songs on The Naked Shakespeare and Blegvad returned the favour by writing lyrics for eight of the songs on Greaves’ Accidents album (also released in 1982).

However, Blegvad's attempts at a British solo career suffered due to record company politics and the effects of 1980s production styles. Pushed by producers into an over-complex and technological sound, he himself favoured the sparser and rawer sound of his small live band which included his brother Kristoffer on guitar and backing vocals. Disillusioned, Peter Blegvad returned to New York in 1986 and began collaborating with The Golden Palominos, the art rock band led by ex-Pere Ubu drummer Anton Fier.

== Formation ==
By 1988, these various connections had eventually coalesced into The Lodge, a project which had explicitly been intended as a follow-up to Kew. Rhone. but which had taken a long time to emerge. Blegvad has reflected “We lacked discipline in those days, or something, I don't know... John and I retired to a Vermont farmhouse one hot summer with the idea of writing an album... and I think I wrote one line in two months!"

The songs for The Lodge had been written over a period of about seven years dating from Blegvad's 1982 return to England. As with Kew. Rhone., Blegvad wrote all of the lyrics and Greaves the music. Initially just a duo of Blegvad (guitar, vocals) and Greaves (keyboards, bass, vocals), with Lisa Herman joining them as guest vocalist, The Lodge ultimately transformed into a New York-based band by adding Jakko Jakszyk (guitar, flute and vocals), Anton Fier (drums) and Kristoffer Blegvad (vocals).

== Smell of a Friend ==
The group's only album - Smell of a Friend - was recorded in New York in 1988 (with overdubs added in Cambridge, UK). It was released by Island Records the same year. Kristoffer Blegvad handled most of the lead vocals, although those on the title track were split with Jakszyk. (Elsewhere, Greaves recited the words on "Old Man’s Mood", and Lisa Herman briefly joined the ensemble to contribute lead vocals and piano to "Swelling Valley" as well as backing vocals elsewhere on the album.) Additional musical backing was provided by Gary Windo (tenor saxophone), David Hofstra (double bass), percussionist Michael Blair, future smooth jazz star Chris Botti (trumpet), and backing singers Deborah Berg (Eye To Eye) and Jane Edwards.

Influenced by the time of its recording (and perhaps by Jakszyk's more direct approach as a performer), the music of The Lodge was much more compact and straightforward than that of Henry Cow or Kew. Rhone., with a stronger emphasis on rock guitar riffs. Some pieces, such as “The Little Match Girl” were effectively straight-ahead rock songs (albeit with typically Blegvad-ian lyrical twists and word-games). Others, such as “Not All Fathers” and “Old Man’s Mood”, showed elements of tone poetry mixed in with African and art rock rhythms, piano balladry, chants and chamber chorales. The Lisa Herman showcase, “Swelling Valley”, was a romantic piano-and-solo-voice performance which had more in common with an Aaron Copland American landscape piece than with the muscular art rock songs elsewhere on the record.

The album's most experimental aspect was in its approach to words. Several songs dealt with the topic of milk, explored from a symbolic or ritualistic perspective and in a manner which Blegvad referred to as a pursuit of its “occult subtext”. The title track and the songs “Solitary” and “Milk” used cut-up texts sourced from writings about milk by various writers (including philosopher Gaston Bachelard, dramatists Jacques Audiberti and Antonin Artaud), and classical scholar/mythologist Jane Ellen Harrison) which were arranged into “what seemed to be a congruent order” and then edited into lyrics. Blegvad also employed three “word chords” (multiple different words spoken simultaneously) to close “Old Man’s Mood”. He described these as “meta-phonemes, in which a story is told vertically instead of horizontally.”

== Live performances ==
The Lodge's initial live performances were in May 1987 as a duo/trio of Greaves and Peter Blegvad with Lisa Herman guesting on some songs. These concerts took place in small venues in Greenwich Village, New York – one of them as part of a series of “Pretentious Music” nights.

In 1988 the album line-up of The Lodge performed a concert at the Bataclan in Paris minus Herman and Fier, with Gavin Harrison taking over on drums and Lyndon Connah (64 Spoons) as live keyboard player. A second concert was played at the ICA, London in 1989 (again minus Herman and Fier) with Steve Franklin (In Cahoots) replacing Connah and Nic France (Nucleus, Loose Tubes) replacing Harrison.

== The Lodge disbanded ==
Following the European concerts, the band – always loosely connected - drifted apart. Both Greaves and Blegvad resumed solo careers – in Blegvad's case, far more happily than before (his next album, 1990's King Strut and Other Stories, gained excellent reviews and he returned to a UK-based career). Jakszyk went on to work with Tom Robinson, Dizrhythmia, Level 42 and 21st Century Schizoid Band as well as pursuing a solo career (often accompanied by Gavin Harrison). Fier concentrated on the Golden Palominos, in which he was sometimes joined by Herman. Kristoffer Blegvad moved to Rome but continued to contribute to his brother's recordings and live concerts.

In typical Henry Cow/Rock in Opposition fashion The Lodge's participants worked together again in various combinations, but The Lodge itself was over. Due mostly to the band's short life, the project has tended to be obscured by its members’ individual and collective projects both beforehand and afterwards. Enough interest in The Lodge remained to ensure that Smell of a Friend was reissued on the Voiceprint label in 1996.

Two songs from Smell of a Friend ("Swelling Valley" and "The Song") were later to reappear on John Greaves' 1996 album Songs, the former sung by Kristoffer Blegvad and S'Ange and the latter by Robert Wyatt (who also contributed a reinterpretation of two Kew. Rhone. songs - the title track and Gegenstand).

== Kew. Rhone. live, 2008 ==
As a long-delayed postscript, Kew. Rhone. was finally performed live in its entirety at Les Abattoirs, Bourgoin-Jallieu in May 2008 (thirty-one years after its original release and nineteen years after the demise of The Lodge). The live band was John Greaves (piano, vocals), Peter Blegvad (vocals, computer), Lisa Herman (vocals), Jef Morin (guitar), David Lewis (trumpet, flugelhorn), Daniel Yvinec (bass), Simon Goubert (drums) and Cecile Bohler (additional vocals) with live video mix by Eric Petrotto.

== Discography ==
- Smell of a Friend (Antilles/New Directions (Island), 1988 – reissued Resurgence (Voiceprint), 1996)
