= The Henry Cow Box Redux: The Complete Henry Cow =

Box set by Henry Cow
- Released: 24 November 2019
- Recorded: 1971–1978
- Genre: Avant-rock; free improvisation
- Length: 975:40 (excluding bonus CD)
- Label: Recommended (UK)
- Producer: Henry Cow

Henry Cow chronology
The 40th Anniversary Henry Cow Box Set (2009)	The Henry Cow Box Redux: The Complete Henry Cow (2019)

The Henry Cow Box Redux: The Complete Henry Cow (subtitled 50th Anniversary Box) is a seventeen-CD plus one-DVD box set by English avant-rock group Henry Cow; it was released by RēR Megacorp in November 2019. The box set comprises the previously released 2006 Henry Cow Box (excluding the bonus CD-single: "Unreleased Orckestra Extract") and the 2009 40th Anniversary Henry Cow Box Set (including the bonus CD: A Cow Cabinet of Curiosities), totalling over sixteen hours. A bonus CD: Ex Box – Collected Fragments 1971–1978 was given to advance subscribers of the 2019 Box Redux, and contains newly recovered and previously unreleased recordings, plus the contents of the 2006 box set bonus CD-single: "Unreleased Orckestra Extract". The 2019 Box Redux plus the Ex Box bonus CD contains all the officially released studio and live recordings of Henry Cow, excluding "Bellycan" as released on the 1991 East Side Digital version of Legend, (Note: "Bellycan" is an extract from Henry Cow's set on Greasy Truckers Live at Dingwalls Dance Hall (1973); the full Greasy Truckers set is included in Volume 6 and 7: Concerts of the Redux box set.) and the complete version of "The Glove" from the 1991 East Side Digital version of Unrest.

The Henry Cow Box Redux was released to coincide with the 50th anniversary of the formation of Henry Cow. Included in the box set are three 60-page booklets: Book 1: The Studio Volumes 1–7; Book 2: The Road Volumes 8–12; and Book 3: The Road Volumes 13–17. All the studio CDs were remastered by Bob Drake. RēR Megacorp also released the Ex Box bonus CD as a free-standing album.

In December 2022, a supplemental CD was released, Volume 20: Glastonbury and Elsewhere containing unreleased material uncovered after the release of the Redux box set in 2019.

== Reception ==
A review of The Henry Cow Box Redux: The Complete Henry Cow in Moors Magazine called Henry Cow "one of the most fascinating and best British bands ever". It described their music as having "the mentality of free jazz and the discipline of the intelligent rock of Zappa". It was always "exciting" and "surprising" music and just as relevant today as it was 50 years ago. The reviewer concluded that "[t]his box is an absolute must for lovers of intelligent jazz rock."

Reviewing the box set in the British progressive rock magazine, Prog, Mike Barnes called Henry Cow "one of the most exploratory groups of the 70s". He praised their studio albums in the box, from the "dazzling" Canterbury-influenced debut, Legend, to the "concise, chamber ensemble feel" of Western Culture. The remainder of the collection, their live recordings, completes the Henry Cow story. He said the band's improvisations were "rare in progressive rock", but felt that while much of their music was "extraordinary", not all of it worked. For example, Barnes described the Trondheim concert as "desultory instrumental conversations", and Tim Hodgkinson's "severe, serialist 16-minute" "Erk Gah" on the DVD in Verey "a very tough nut to crack". But Barnes complemented the performance in Bremen of Fred Frith's "New Suite", and the concert in Halsteren where the band played with themes from Hodgkinson's "Living in the Heart of the Beast".

Roger Trenwith wrote in The Progressive Aspect that this box set "messes with your preconceptions of compositional construction and recording techniques". He said Henry Cow's music "is not ... easy listening", but it is "hugely imaginative, often intentionally humorous, more than occasionally terrifying, and always interesting". He complimented Bob Drake on his remastering of the band's studio albums, adding that their "clarity ... is stunning". Trenwith stated that Henry Cow's studio work illustrates how varied their music was and how it progressed from one album to the next. He called In Praise of Learning "frighteningly good", but felt that Western Culture was "an academic exercise [that] is quite satisfying, but ... lack[ing] something". Of the live recordings, Trenwith listed the Bremen CD as the highlight, with its "thrilling display of quality chamber rock" in "New Suite", and the "Der Kunst Der Orgel" improvisation that he felt is "less ethereal, and ... more involving" than the Trondheim set. Trenwith concluded that the three booklets are full of interesting material and "are worthy of a review themselves".

== Contents ==
Source: Box set and Bonus CD liner notes.

=== Volume 1: Leg End ===
==== Track list ====
No.	Title	Writer(s)	Length
1.	"Nirvana for Mice"	Fred Frith	4:56
2.	"Amygdala"	Tim Hodgkinson	6:57
3.	"Teenbeat Introduction"	Henry Cow	4:32
4.	"Teenbeat"	Frith, John Greaves	6:47
5.	"silence – end of side 1"		0:15
6.	"Extract from 'With the Yellow Half-Moon and Blue Star'"	Frith	3:37
7.	"Teenbeat Reprise"	Frith	5:04
8.	"The Tenth Chaffinch"	Henry Cow	6:04
9.	"Nine Funerals of the Citizen King"	Hodgkinson	5:34
Total length:			43:53

==== Track notes ====
- Leg End was originally released on LP in 1973 as The Henry Cow Legend
- In the box set liner notes, "Teenbeat" is incorrectly credited to Henry Cow
- In the box set liner notes, "Extract from 'With the Yellow Half-Moon and Blue Star'" is incorrectly credited to Frith and Greaves
- The bonus track "Bellycan" that appears on the 1991 East Side Digital CD release of Legend is an extract/out-take from Henry Cow's 1973 set on Greasy Truckers Live at Dingwalls Dance Hall, which is included in Volume 6–7: Concerts

=== Volume 2: Unrest ===
==== Track list ====
No.	Title	Writer(s)	Length
1.	"Bittern Storm over Ulm"	Fred Frith	2:19
2.	"Half Asleep; Half Awake"	John Greaves	7:59
3.	"Ruins"	Frith	12:11
4.	"silence – end of side 1"		0:15
5.	"Solemn Music"	Frith	1:11
6.	"Linguaphonie"	Henry Cow	5:31
7.	"Upon Entering the Hotel Adlon"	Henry Cow	3:04
8.	"Arcades"	Henry Cow	1:58
9.	"Deluge"	Henry Cow	5:25
Total length:			37:57

==== Track notes ====
- The bonus tracks "The Glove" and "Torch Fire" that appear on the 1991 East Side Digital CD release of Unrest are included on the Cow Cabinet of Curiosities and Ex Box – Collected Fragments 1971–1978 bonus CDs respectively, although only an excerpted version of "The Glove" is included.

=== Volume 3: Desperate Straights ===
==== Track list ====
No.	Title	Writer(s)	Length
1.	"Some Questions about Hats"	Anthony Moore, Peter Blegvad	1:51
2.	"The Owl"	Moore	2:17
3.	"A Worm Is at Work"	Moore, Blegvad	1:52
4.	"Bad Alchemy"	John Greaves, Blegvad	3:06
5.	"Europa"	Moore, Blegvad	2:48
6.	"Desperate Straights"	Moore	4:14
7.	"Riding Tigers"	Blegvad	1:43
8.	"silence – end of side 1"		0:15
9.	"Apes in Capes"	Moore	2:16
10.	"Strayed"	Blegvad	1:54
11.	"Giants"	Moore, Blegvad	1:57
12.	"Excerpt from The Messiah"	George Frideric Handel, arr. Blegvad	1:49
13.	"In the Sickbay"	Dagmar Krause, Blegvad	2:09
14.	"Caucasian Lullaby"	Chris Cutler, Moore	8:25
Total length:			36:43

==== Track notes ====
- In the box set liner notes "Excerpt from The Messiah" is credited to Handel and Blegvad

=== Volume 4: In Praise of Learning ===
==== Track list ====
No.	Title	Writer(s)	Length
1.	"War"	Anthony Moore, Peter Blegvad	2:31
2.	"Living in the Heart of the Beast"	Tim Hodgkinson	16:12
3.	"silence – end of side 1"		0:15
4.	"Beginning: The Long March"	Henry Cow	6:00
5.	"Beautiful as the Moon; Terrible as an Army with Banners"	Chris Cutler, Fred Frith	7:02
6.	"Morning Star"	Henry Cow	6:03
Total length:			38:06

==== Track notes ====
- On the LP and CD releases of In Praise of Learning, "Beginning: The Long March" and "Morning Star" are credited to Henry Cow and Slapp Happy
- The bonus track "Lovers of Gold" that appears on the 1991 East Side Digital CD release of In Praise of Learning is included on the Cow Cabinet of Curiosities bonus CD

=== Volume 5: Western Culture ===
==== Track list ====
History & Prospects
No.	Title	Writer(s)	Length
1.	"Industry"	Tim Hodgkinson	6:51
2.	"The Decay of Cities"	Hodgkinson	6:49
3.	"On the Raft"	Hodgkinson	3:58
4.	"silence – end of side 1"		0:15

Day by Day
No.	Title	Writer(s)	Length
5.	"Falling Away"	Lindsay Cooper	7:30
6.	"Gretel's Tale"	Cooper	3:52
7.	"Look Back"	Cooper	1:13
8.	"Half the Sky"	Cooper, Hodgkinson	6:37
Total length:			36:14

==== Track notes ====
- The bonus tracks "Viva Pa Ubu", "Look Back (alt)" and "Slice" that appear on the CD releases of Western Culture are included on the Ex Box – Collected Fragments 1971–1978 bonus CD

=== Volume 6 and 7: Concerts ===
==== Track list ====
Concerts 1
No.	Title	Writer(s)	Length
1.	"Beautiful as the Moon, Terrible as an Army with Banners"	Chris Cutler, Fred Frith	5:40
2.	"Nirvana for Mice"	Frith	5:30
3.	"The Ottawa Song"	Cutler, Frith	4:15
4.	"Gloria Gloom"	Robert Wyatt, Bill MacCormick	4:13
5.	"Beautiful as the Moon (Reprise)"	Cutler, Frith	3:03
6.	"Bad Alchemy"	John Greaves, Peter Blegvad	2:54
7.	"Little Red Riding Hood Hits the Road"	Wyatt	5:47
8.	"Ruins"	Frith	16:24
9.	"Groningen"	Tim Hodgkinson, Henry Cow	8:53
10.	"Groningen Again"	Henry Cow	7:26
Total length:			64:27

Concerts 2
No.	Title	Writer(s)	Length
1.	"Oslo 1"	Henry Cow	5:37
2.	"Oslo 2"	Henry Cow	3:15
3.	"Oslo 3"	Henry Cow	3:23
4.	"Oslo 4"	Henry Cow	3:00
5.	"Oslo 5"	Henry Cow	3:00
6.	"Oslo 6"	Henry Cow	1:44
7.	"Oslo 7"	Henry Cow	5:54
8.	"Oslo 8"	Henry Cow	3:55
9.	"Off the Map": "Solo Piano"; "Trio"	Hodgkinson, Cutler, Frith Hodgkinson Hodgkinson, Cutler, Frith	8:22
10.	"Café Royal" (solo guitar)	Frith	3:20
11.	"Keeping Warm in Winter" / "Sweet Heart of Mine"	Frith, Greaves / Henry Cow	9:56
12.	"Udine"	Henry Cow	9:39
Total length:			60:20

=== Volume 8: Beginnings ===
==== Track list ====
No.	Title	Writer(s)	Length
1.	"Pre-Teenbeat I"	Fred Frith	1:44
2.	"Pre-Teenbeat II"	Frith	1:28
3.	"Rapt in a Blanket"	Frith	5:06
4.	"Came to See You"	Frith	6:43
5.	"Amygdala extract (pre-Legend demo)"	Tim Hodgkinson	3:35
6.	"Teenbeat"	Frith	10:19
7.	"Citizen King"	Hodgkinson	5:21
8.	"Nirvana for Moles"	Frith	4:09

With the Yellow Half-Moon and Blue Star
No.	Title	Writer(s)	Length
9.	"Introduction"	Frith	0:46
10.	"Invocation"	Frith	2:08
11.	"Demi-Lune Jaune"	Frith	2:10
12.	"Three Little Steps"	Frith	2:13
13.	"Red Riff"	Frith	1:50
14.	"Chorale Flautando"	Frith	1:51
15.	"Cycling over the Cliff"	Frith	4:08
16.	"First Light"	Frith	0:51

Guider Tells of Silent Airborne Machine
No.	Title	Writer(s)	Length
17.	"Olwyn Grainger"	Chris Cutler, Frith, John Greaves, Hodgkinson	2:24
18.	"Betty McGowan"	Cutler, Frith, Greaves, Hodgkinson, Geoff Leigh	6:12
19.	"Lottie Hare"	Greaves	1:24
Total length:			64:26

=== Volume 9: 1974–5 ===
==== Track list ====
No.	Title	Writer(s)	Length
1.	"Introduction"	Lindsay Cooper	1:52
2.	"Ruins I"	Fred Frith	6:35
3.	"Half Asleep, Half Awake"	John Greaves	4:11
4.	"Ruins II"	Frith	0:59
5.	"Heron Shower over Hamburg"	Frith	2:29
6.	"Nix"		0:06

Halsteren (Hodgkinson, Frith, Greaves, Cutler)
No.	Title	Writer(s)	Length
7.	"Halsteren 1"		1:08
8.	"Solo 1"	Tim Hodgkinson	1:08
9.	"Solo Extension 1"		2:21
10.	"Halsteren 2"		1:24
11.	"Extension 1"		0:17
12.	"Halsteren 3"		0:52
13.	"First Suspension"		4:28
14.	"Extension 2"		2:58
15.	"Extension 3"		1:19
16.	"Solo 2"	Frith	1:20
17.	"Solo Extension 2"		2:32
18.	"Halsteren 4"		0:17
19.	"Second Suspension"		2:34
20.	"Extension 4"		1:58
21.	"Solo 3"		0:49
22.	"Solo Extension 3"	Greaves	3:17
23.	"Halsteren 5"		1:21

Living in the Heart of the Beast
No.	Title	Writer(s)	Length
24.	"Living in the Heart of the Beast": 24. "Part 1"; 25. "Part 2"; 26. "Part 3"; 27. "Part 4"; 28. "Part 5"; 29. "Part 6"; 30. "Part 7"; 31. "Part 8"; 32. "Part 9"	Hodgkinson	13:46
Total length:			60:21

=== Volume 10: Hamburg ===
==== Track list ====
No.	Title	Writer(s)	Length
1.	"Fair as the Moon"	Chris Cutler, Fred Frith	6:01
2.	"Nirvana for Rabbits"	Frith	4:48
3.	"Ottawa Song"	Cutler, Frith	3:41
4.	"Twilight Bridge"	Lindsay Cooper, Cutler, Frith, John Greaves, Tim Hodgkinson, Dagmar Krause	2:04
5.	"Gloria Gloom"	Robert Wyatt, Bill MacCormick	2:17
6.	"Hamburg 1"	Cooper, Cutler, Frith, Greaves, Hodgkinson, Krause	4:15
7.	"Hamburg 2"	Cooper, Cutler, Frith, Greaves, Hodgkinson, Krause	3:27
8.	"Red Noise 10"	Cooper, Cutler, Frith, Greaves, Hodgkinson, Krause	3:16
9.	"Hamburg 3"	Cooper, Cutler, Frith, Greaves, Hodgkinson, Krause	5:30
10.	"Hamburg 4"	Cooper, Cutler, Frith, Greaves, Hodgkinson, Krause	2:40
11.	"Hamburg 5"	Cooper, Cutler, Frith, Greaves, Hodgkinson, Krause	5:25
12.	"Terrible as an Army with Banners"	Cutler, Frith	3:34
13.	"A Heart"	Cooper, Cutler, Frith, Greaves, Hodgkinson, Krause	9:03
14.	"Little Red Riding Hood Hit the Road"	Wyatt	5:12
15.	"We Did It Again"	Kevin Ayers	6:31
Total length:			67:51

=== Volume 11–12: Trondheim ===
==== Track list ====
Trondheim 1
No.	Title	Writer(s)	Length
1.	"Trondheim I": 1. "Part 1"; 2. "Part 2"; 3. "Part 3"; 4. "Part 4"; 5. "Part 5"; 6. "Part 6"; 7. "Part 7"; 8. "Part 8"; 9. "Part 9"; 10. "Part 10"	Lindsay Cooper, Chris Cutler, Fred Frith, Tim Hodgkinson	48:25
Total length:			48:25

Trondheim 2
No.	Title	Writer(s)	Length
1.	"Trondheim II": 1. "Part 1"; 2. "Part 2"; 3. "Part 3"; 4. "Part 4"; 5. "Part 5"; 6. "Part 6"	Cooper, Cutler, Frith, Hodgkinson	31:54
7.	"The March"	Frith arr. Henry Cow	6:25
Total length:			38:19

=== Volume 13: Stockholm & Göteborg ===
==== Track list ====
No.	Title	Writer(s)	Length
1.	"Stockholm 1"	Georgina Born, Lindsay Cooper, Chris Cutler, Fred Frith, Tim Hodgkinson	6:38
2.	"Erk Gah": 2. "Part 1"; 3. "Part 2"; 4. "Part 3"; 5. "Part 4"; 6. "Part 5"	Hodgkinson	16:46
7.	"A Bridge to Ruins"	Hodgkinson	5:08
8.	"Ottawa Song"	Cutler, Frith	3:27
9.	"Göteborg 1": 9. "Part 1"; 10. "Part 2"; 11. "Part 3"	Cooper, Cutler, Frith, John Greaves, Hodgkinson	16:53
12.	"No More Songs"	Phil Ochs arr. Frith	3:35
13.	"Stockholm 2"	Born, Cooper, Cutler, Frith, Hodgkinson, Dagmar Krause	6:13
14.	"March"	Frith	4:15
Total length:			63:23

==== Track notes ====
- The CD track listing incorrectly credits Greaves as appearing on "Göteborg 1"; this error is noted in the liner notes (see Stockholm & Göteborg for details)

=== Volume 14: Later and Post-Virgin ===
==== Track list ====
No.	Title	Writer(s)	Length
1.	"Joan"	Chris Cutler, Fred Frith	5:26
2.	"Teenbeat 2"	Frith	8:05
3.	"Would You Prefer Us to Lie?"	Cutler, John Greaves	4:28
4.	"Untitled Piece"	Lindsay Cooper	11:31
5.	"Chaumont 1"	Georgina Born, Cooper, Cutler, Frith, Tim Hodgkinson	9:01
6.	"Chaumont 2"	Cooper, Hodgkinson	2:14
7.	"March"	Frith	7:00
8.	"Brain Storm over Barnsley"	Frith	3:23
9.	"Teenbeat 3"	Frith	6:45
10.	"Post-Teen Auditorium Invasion"	Cooper, Hodgkinson, Geoff Leigh, Annemarie Roelofs	3:56
11.	"Bucket Waltz"	Born, Cooper, Cutler, Frith, Hodgkinson, Leigh, Roelofs	4:26
12.	"On Suicide"	Bertolt Brecht, Hanns Eisler	3:42
Total length:			74:04

=== Volume 15: Bremen ===
==== Track list ====
No.	Title	Writer(s)	Length
1.	"Armed Maniac/Things We Forgot"	Georgina Born, Lindsay Cooper, Chris Cutler, Fred Frith, Tim Hodgkinson	11:55

New Suite
No.	Title	Writer(s)	Length
2.	"Van Fleet"	Frith	1:49
3.	"Viva Pa Ubu instrumental extract"	Hodgkinson	4:35
4.	"The Big Tune Begins"	Frith	0:45
5.	"The Big Tune Continues"	Frith	2:11
6.	"The Big Tune Ends"	Frith	1:30
7.	"March"	Frith	3:46

Die Kunst Der Orgel
No.	Title	Writer(s)	Length
8.	"Bremen": 8. "Part 1"; 9. "Part 2"; 10. "Part 3"; 11. "Part 4"; 12. "Part 5"	Born, Cooper, Cutler, Frith, Hodgkinson	34:25
13.	"Erk Gah instrumental extract" 13 "Part 1" 14 "Part 2"	Hodgkinson	13:04
Total length:			74:07

=== Volume 16: Late ===
==== Track list ====
No.	Title	Writer(s)	Length
1.	"Joy of Sax"		3:50
2.	"Jackie-ing"	Thelonious Monk arr. Mike Westbrook	1:15
3.	"Untitled 2"	Lindsay Cooper	1:32
4.	"The Herring People"	Fred Frith	2:07
5.	"RIO": 5. "Part 1"; 6. "Part 2"; 7. "Part 3"; 8. "Part 4"	Georgina Born, Cooper, Chris Cutler, Frith, Tim Hodgkinson	17:09
9.	"Half the Sky"	Cooper	5:05
10.	"Virgins of Illinois"	trad.	2:13
11.	"Viva Pa Ubu"	Hodgkinson	2:18
Total length:			35:33

=== Volume 17: Vevey (DVD) ===
==== Track list ====
No.	Title	Writer(s)	Length
1.	"Beautiful As ..."	Chris Cutler, Fred Frith	6:50
2.	"Vevey 1"	Georgina Born, Lindsay Cooper, Cutler, Frith, Tim Hodgkinson, Dagmar Krause	8:49
3.	"Terrible As ..."	Cutler, Frith	2:19
4.	Untitled (Tim speaks)		1:04
5.	"No More Songs"	Phil Ochs arr. Frith	3:48
6.	"LITHOTB"	Hodgkinson	16:57
7.	"Vevey 2"	Born, Cooper, Cutler, Frith, Hodgkinson, Krause	13:51
8.	"March"	Frith	2:42
9.	"Erk Gah"	Hodgkinson	18:28
Total length:			75:16

=== Volume 18: A Cow Cabinet of Curiosities ===
==== Track list ====
No.	Title	Writer(s)	Length
1.	"Pre Virgin Demo 1"	mostly Fred Frith	3.55
2.	"Pre Virgin Demo 2"	mostly Tim Hodgkinson	1:02
3.	"Unidentified Improvisation 1"	Lindsay Cooper, Chris Cutler, Frith, John Greaves, Hodgkinson	1:30
4.	"Unidentified Improvisation 2"	Cooper, Cutler, Frith, Greaves, Hodgkinson, Dagmar Krause	5:37
5.	"Unidentified late composition"	probably Cooper	2:04
6.	"Exploded Amygdala/Teen Introduction"	Cutler, Frith, Greaves, Hodgkinson, Geoff Leigh	3:37
7.	"Lovers of Gold"	Cooper, Cutler, Frith, Greaves, Hodgkinson, Krause	6:29
8.	"Hamburg 6"	Cooper, Cutler, Frith, Greaves, Hodgkinson, Krause	5:33
9.	"Ruins extract"	Cooper, Cutler, Frith, Greaves, Hodgkinson, Krause	8:24
10.	"Hamburg 7"	Cooper, Cutler, Frith, Greaves, Hodgkinson, Krause	9:44
11.	"Half the Sky"	Cooper	5:03
12.	"Extract from The Glove"	Cooper, Cutler, Frith, Greaves, Hodgkinson	2:19
Total length:			56:15

=== Bonus CD: Ex Box – Collected Fragments 1971–1978 ===
This is a 250-copy limited edition CD given to subscribers of the Box Redux, although RēR Megacorp also sold the disk as a free-standing album. The CD was compiled by Chris Cutler and mastered by Bob Drake at Studio Midi-Pyrenees in France in October 2019. It comprises previously unreleased recordings, bonus tracks that appeared on reissues of some of Henry Cow's studio albums, plus the two tracks by the Orckestra that were released on the bonus CD-single, "Unreleased Orckestra Extract" that was given to subscribers of the 2006 Henry Cow Box.

==== Track list ====
No.	Title	Writer(s)	Length
1.	"Poglith Drives a Vauxhall Viva"	Tim Hodgkinson	11.05
2.	"Amygdala"	Hodgkinson	6:55
3.	"9 Funerals of the Citizen King"	Hodgkinson	5:26
4.	"Nirvana for Mice"	Fred Frith	3:06
5.	"Free"	Lindsay Cooper, Chris Cutler, Frith, John Greaves, Hodgkinson	3:22
6.	"Fugue"	Frith	2:15
7.	"Teenbeat Extract"	Frith, Greaves	3:41
8.	"Sundsvall, or Helsinki"	Cooper, Cutler, Frith, Hodgkinson	6:15
9.	"Torchfire"	Cooper, Cutler, Frith, Greaves, Hodgkinson	4:48
10.	Untitled	Frith	3:39
11.	"Would You Prefer Us to Lie"	Cutler, Greaves	7:58
12.	"Viva Pa Ubu"	Hodgkinson	4:21
13.	"Slice"	Cooper	0:36
14.	"Look Back, Alt. Version"	Cooper	1:18
15.	"Erk Gah Extract (Instrumental Version)"	Hodgkinson	3:34
16.	"Drones"	Henry Cow	2:32
17.	"Living in the Heart of the Beast (Instrumental Version) Extract"	Hodgkinson	6:13
Total length:			77:04

==== Personnel ====
- Georgie Born – bass guitar (tracks 10–17), cello (tracks 14, 16)
- Lindsay Cooper – bassoon, sopranino saxophone (tracks 2, 4–17), piano (tracks 8–9), voice (track 12)
- Chris Cutler – drums, flageolet, electrification (tracks 2–17), xylophone (track 9)
- Sean Jenkins – drums (track 1) (Note: The demo recording of "Poglith Drives a Vauxhall Viva" did not feature Martin Ditcham on drums as the "Ex Box" liner notes state, but Henry Cow's previous drummer, Sean Jenkins.)
- Fred Frith – electric and acoustic guitar (all tracks), viola (track 17), voice (tracks 3, 12)
- John Greaves – bass guitar (tracks 1–7), voice (track 3)
- Tim Hodgkinson – alto saxophone, organ (all tracks), voice (tracks 3, 8, 12)
- Dagmar Krause – voice (tracks 11–12)
- Geoff Leigh – tenor saxophone (tracks 2–3), flute, voice (track 3)
- Kate Westbrook – euphonium (tracks 10–11)
- Mike Westbrook – piano (tracks 10–11)
- Dave Chambers – soprano saxophone (tracks 10–11)
- Paul Rutherford – trombone (tracks 10–11)
- Phil Minton – voice, trumpet (tracks 10–11)
- Frankie Armstrong – voice (tracks 10–11)

===== Production =====
- Chris Cutler – compilation
- Bob Drake – mastering
- Tim Schwartz – design

==== Track notes ====
Source: Bonus CD liner notes.

- Track 1: A demo recorded in 1971 in Cambridge and features Henry Cow's second drummer, Sean Jenkins; it was sent to John Peel's Rockertunity Knocks competition, which resulted in the composition being performed by Henry Cow on the John Peel Show on 4 May 1971 in London.
- Tracks 2–3: Remixed versions of "Amygdala" (with Cooper playing bassoon) and "Nine Funerals of the Citizen King" from Henry Cow's first album, Legend by Hodgkinson at Cold Storage Studios in London in 1990; previously released in 1991 on the East Side Digital CD reissue of Legend.
- Tracks 4–7: Taken from a cassette recording of a concert at the Theatre Royal in Sheffield on 9 June 1974 while on tour with Captain Beefheart; "Free" is a bridge, while "Fugue" is an extract from Frith's "With the Yellow Half-Moon and Blue Star".
- Track 8: Taken from a cassette recording made during Henry Cow's May 1976 tour of Scandinavia where as a quartet of Cooper, Cutler, Frith and Hodgkinson they improvised their performance in the dark; another recording from the tour in Trondheim was released in The 40th Anniversary Henry Cow Box Set#Volume 4–5: Trondheim.
- Track 9: An outtake from recordings for side two of Unrest; previously released as a bonus track in 1991 on the East Side Digital's CD reissue of Unrest.
- Tracks 10–11: Taken from a cassette recording of an Orckestra concert in Europe in March–May 1978; previously released on a bonus mini-CD, "Unreleased Orckestra Extract" that was given to subscribers of the 2006 Henry Cow Box.
- Tracks 12–14: Outtakes from Henry Cow's recordings at Sunrise Studios in Kirchberg, Switzerland in January 1978 ("Viva Pa Ubu") and July–August 1978 ("Slice", "Look Back, Alt Version"); (Note: The "Ex Box" liner notes incorrectly state that "Slice" and "Look Back, Alt Version" were recorded at Sunrise Studios in January 1978. They were recorded at Sunrise Studios in July–August 1978.) previously released in 2001 and 2002 on the Recommend and East Side Digital CD reissues of Western Culture respectively.
- Tracks 15–17: Taken from a cassette recording of a concert at the Teatro Olimpico in Parma, Italy on 20 February 1977.

=== Volume 20: Glastonbury and Elsewhere ===
Released in December 2022 as a supplement to The Henry Cow Box Redux, it contains additional unreleased material uncovered after the release of the box set in 2019. Cutler stated in the liner notes that these recordings "are not hi fidelity", but in some instances are the only surviving recordings to feature these Henry Cow lineups".

Glastonbury and Elsewhere was released in two forms, as a standalone digipak, and in a sleeve designed to fit into the Redux box.

Lindsay Cooper is credited playing on "Half Asleep, Half Awake" but as the song was recorded at the Manor in November 1973 during Greasy Truckers Live at Dingwalls Dance Hall recordings Geoff Leigh was still playing with the band instead.

==== Track list ====
No.	Title	Writer(s)	Length
1.	"Poglith Drives a Vauxhall Viva"	Tim Hodgkinson	16.56
2.	"Half Asleep, Half Awake"	John Greaves	1:50
3.	"The Road to Ruins"	Georgina Born, Lindsay Cooper, Chris Cutler, Fred Frith, Tim Hodgkinson	11:00
4.	"The Lions of Desire, with Phil Minton"	Frith, Chaplin, traditional, Mike Westbrook	17:44
5.	Untitled	Frith, Thelonious Monk	13:03
Total length:			60:47

==== Personnel ====
Source: Box set liner notes.

- Tim Hodgkinson – saxophone (track 1), alto saxophone (tracks 2–5), organ (tracks 1–3, 5), tapes (tracks 3, 5)
- Fred Frith – electric guitar (tracks 1–5), bass guitar (track 4), tapes (tracks 3, 5), viola (track 4), xylophone (track 4)
- Georgie Born – bass guitar (tracks 3, 5), cello (track 5)
- John Greaves – bass guitar (tracks 1–2)
- Lindsay Cooper – bassoon (tracks 3, 5), recorder (tracks 3, 5), oboe (track 2), tapes (tracks 3, 5)
- Chris Cutler – drums (tracks 2–5), liner notes
- Martin Ditcham – drums (track 1)
- Phil Minton – voice (track 4), trumpet (track 4)

==== Track notes ====
Source: Box set liner notes.

- Track 1: Recorded live by John Lundsten at the Glastonbury Fayre in June 1971; (Note: "Poglith Drives a Vauxhall Viva" was recorded in June 1971, not 1972 as the Glastonbury and Elsewhere liner notes state; Martin Ditcham (on drums) was only with Henry Cow between May and September 1971.) the earliest and only known live recording of the Henry Cow lineup at the time (Martin Ditcham, Fred Frith, John Greaves and Tim Hodgkinson)
- Track 2: Recorded at The Manor, Oxfordshire in November 1973; extract of a studio session recorded by a film crew
- Track 3: Recorded live at Chaumont, Salles de Fetes, France in November 1976; additional extracts from the Chaumont concert (see Volume 14: Later and Post-Virgin); this improvisation runs into Frith's "Ruins"
- Track 4: Recorded live somewhere in France in April 1978 with Phil Minton; (Note: "The Lions of Desire, with Phil Minton" was recorded in April 1978, not 1977 as the Glastonbury and Elsewhere liner notes state.) Minton (from the Mike Westbrook Brass Band) had joined Frith, Hodgkinson and Cutler (all that remained of Henry Cow at the time), and calling themselves "The Lions of Desire", they performed in Spain and France in April 1978; includes extracts from Frith's "Ruins" and Westbrook's "Mourn not the Dead", "Lady Howard's Coach" and "Virgin of Illinois"; this is the only known recording from this lineup
- Track 5: Recorded live in Bilbao, Teatro S. Vincente, Spain in November 1977; includes extracts from Frith's "Teenbeat", two untitled Frith compositions, and Thelonious Monk's "Jackie-ing"

== Box artwork ==
- Graphic design – Tim Schwartz
- Bus photo – Sula Goschen
- "Henry Cow" lettering – derived from the "Henry Cow" lettering used in a 1973 newspaper advert created by Ray Smith for Legend

== Works cited ==
- Cutler, Chris, ed. (2019a). "Book 1: The Studio – Official Releases". The Henry Cow Box Redux: The Complete Henry Cow (box set booklet). Henry Cow. London: Recommended Records.
- Piekut, Benjamin (2019). Henry Cow: The World Is a Problem. Duke University Press. ISBN 978-1-47800-405-9.
