= Catherine Delaunay =

French jazz clarinet player and composer

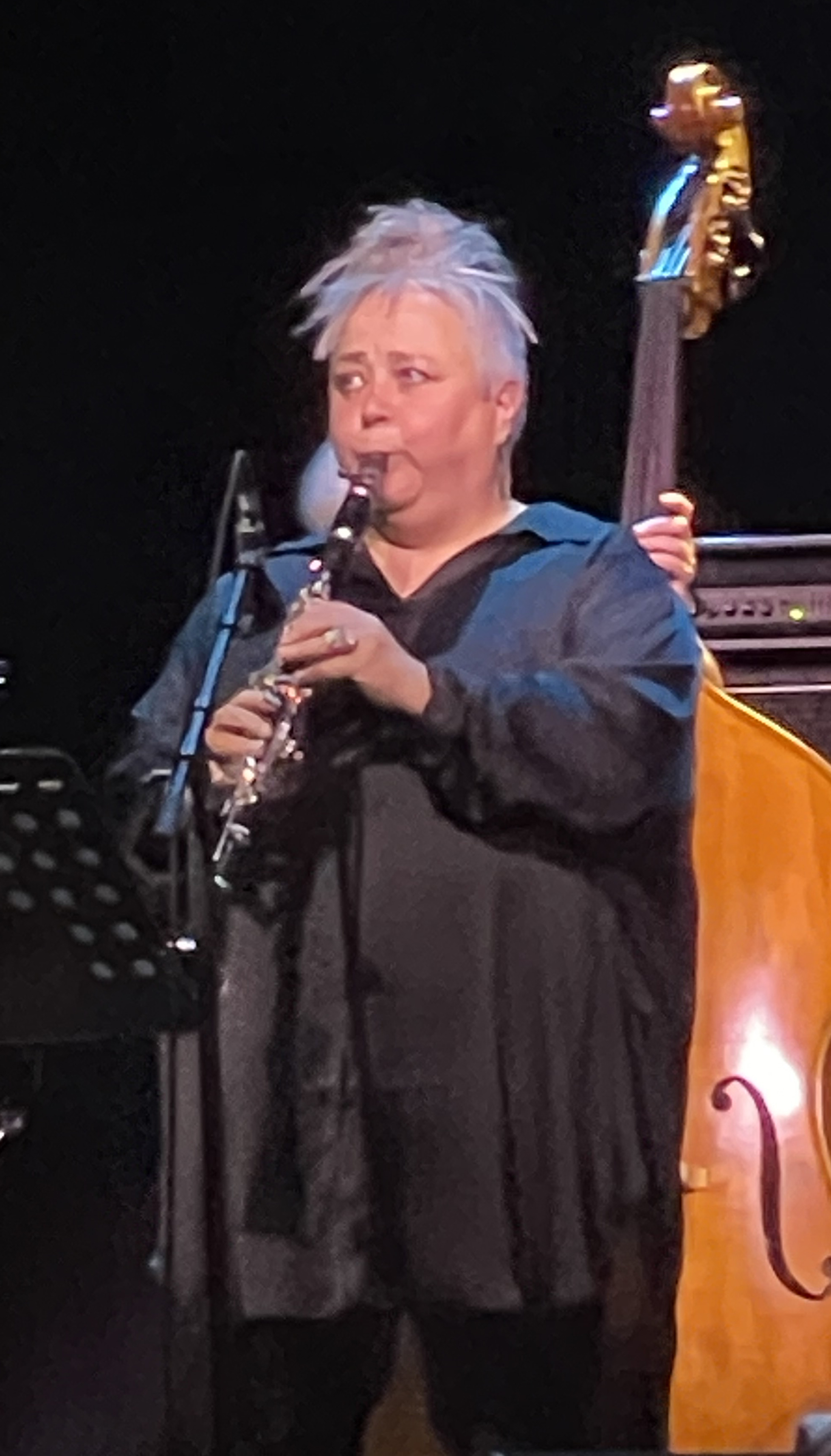
- Catherine Delaunay in 2025

Background information
- Born: 31 October 1969 (age 56); Brittany, France
- Genres: Jazz, Classical music
- Occupations: Musician, Composer, Band leader
- Instruments: Clarinets, Basset-horn, Bass clarinet, soprano saxophone, Diatonic accordion
- Label: Les neuf filles de Zeus
- Website: lesneuffillesdezeus.com

Catherine Delaunay (born 31 October 1969) is a French jazz clarinet player and composer, best known as a leader of Y'en a qui manquent pas d'air. She is also a member of the French Laurent Dehors's big band "Tous Dehors".

== Biography ==
Delaunay grew up in Brittany, France. She started studying the clarinet at the age of six in a local music school. Later on, she studied the piano (1978–1985) and drums (1991 and 1994). She then studied music at the Conservatoire National de Région de Rennes.

From 1989 to 1995, she studied at the Conservatoire National Supérieur de Musique de Lyon (CNSMD). She studied the clarinet with Jacques Di Donato (where she passed the Diplôme National d'Etudes Supérieures Musicales of clarinet in 1993), Chamber Music with Jacques Aboulker (where she passed the Certificat d'Etudes Spécialisées of chamber music in 1993), Contemporary music (where she passed the Certificat d'Etudes Complémentaires Spécialisées "Atelier instrumental du XXème siècle" in 1993), Composition, Musical Analysis and Harmony with Loïc Mallié, and 5 keys clarinet and chalumeau with Jean-Claude Veilhan (where she passed the Certificat d'Etudes Complémentaires Spécialisées de clarinet ancienne et chalumeau in 1995). From 1991 to 1994, she also studied drums with Jean-Louis Mechali.

While studying at the CNSMD, she performed with Marc Perrone, Laurent Dehors, and Alain Blesing.

== Current career ==
Catherine Delaunay leads and composes music for several bands. She has set music to poems by Malcolm Lowry for her new projects Sois patient car le loup, for which Delaunay plays the clarinet and the diatonic accordion, John Greaves sings and plays the ukulele, Isabelle Olivier plays the harp, Thierry Lhiver plays the trombone, and Guillaume Séguron plays the double bass. Since 2000, Catherine Delaunay has been leading and composing music for the French fanfare "Y'en a qui manquent pas d'air", in which she plays with Lionel Martin (saxophone), Daniel Casimir (trombone), Didier Havet (sousaphone), and Tatiana Lejude (drums).

Catherine Delaunay is part of many other projects. She plays in duet with Pascal Van den Heuvel (saxophone), in duet with Tatiana Lejude (drums), and in trio for the group "Trio Plumes" with Edouard Ferlet and Benoît Dunoyer de Segonzac. She also performs regularly with Régis Huby, Laurent Dehors, and Olivier Thomas in the group Tomassenko (with Olivier Thomas singing, Laurent Rousseau on guitar, Michel Massot on tuba and trombone, and Etienne Plumer on drums).

Catherine Delaunay also plays with dancers (Cie Clara Cornil Cie Thierry Thieû Niang), actors (Cie Tomassenko Cie L'oeil du Tigre, "Les Valises", mise en scène Hélène Arnaud, "Le Gris", mise en scène Pietro Pizzuti).

With Pierre Badaroux on double bass, Catherine Delaunay sets to music silent films like Lotte Reiniger's The Adventures of Prince Achmed (Die Abenteuer des Prinzen Achmed, 1926), Dziga Vertov's Man with a Movie Camera (1928), and Vsevolod Pudovkin Chess Fever (La Fièvre des échecs, 1925).

== Others ==
Catherine Delaunay played with many musicians, including Tony Hymas, Nathan Hanson, Donald Washington, Doan Brian Roessler, Simon Goubert, Steve Coleman, Matt Wilson, Daniel Goyone, Claude Tchamitchian, Serge Lazarevitch, Lucia Reccio, Denis Chancerel, Philippe Botta, Archimusic, Dave Burrell, Takayuki Kato, Nobuyoshi Ino, Yuri Kusetsov, Vladimir Volkoff, and Bruno Tocanne.

== Discography ==
- Le chien déguisé en vache (2008) avec Pascal Van den Heuvel
- Simple Sound (2008), sextet de Régis Huby
- Songs from the beginning (2007), Alain Blesing
- Plumes (2006), avec Edouard Ferlet et Benoît Dunoyer de Segonzac
- Coeur de Lune (2002), avec Y'en a qui manquent pas d'air, avec Lionel Martin, Daniel Casimir, Didier Havet, Bruno Tocanne, Tatiana Mladenovitch-Lejude
- Nuit américaine, Lambert Wilson, Maria Laura Baccarini, Stephy Haïk, Régis Huby
- Dans la rue, Dentiste, Tu tousses, Dommage à Glenn, Que tàl Carmen, Happy Birthday, Big band de Laurent Dehors
- Dis bonjour au monsieur, Cinéma mémoire, Marc Perrone
- Tocade'S, avec Bruno Tocanne
- Mozart et l'ami Staedler, le Trio de Bassetto, Jean-Claude Veilhan
- Les Bulles, avec Daniel Hélin
- Aux solitudes, avec Jean-Philippe Goude
- La double vie de Pétrichor, trio Guillaume Séguron, Catherine Delaunay, Davu Seru
- Daisy Tambour, Tomassenko de Belgique
- Need Eden Acoustic Lousadzac, Claude Tchamitchian
- Apaches (2018), with Sébastien Gariniaux and Pascal Van den Heuvel
- Thollot in Extenso (2018), three pieces in duo with Tony Hymas
- L'ogre intact (2019), Pierrick Hardy quartet
- Vol pour Sidney (2020), five pieces with Matt Wilson, Donald Washington, Davu Seru ...

== Recordings of music for films ==
- La première fois que j'ai eu 20 ans, Mes amis mes amours, films de Lorraine Lévy
- Un petit jeu sans conséquence, film de Bernard Rapp
- Le Ciel sur la tête, de Régis Musset
- Un couple épatant, film de Lucas Belvaux
- Ma vie à l'hôtel, documentaire de Valérie Desnel
- La consultation, documentaire de Hélène de Crécy
