= Sophia Domancich =

French pianist & jazz composer (born 1957)

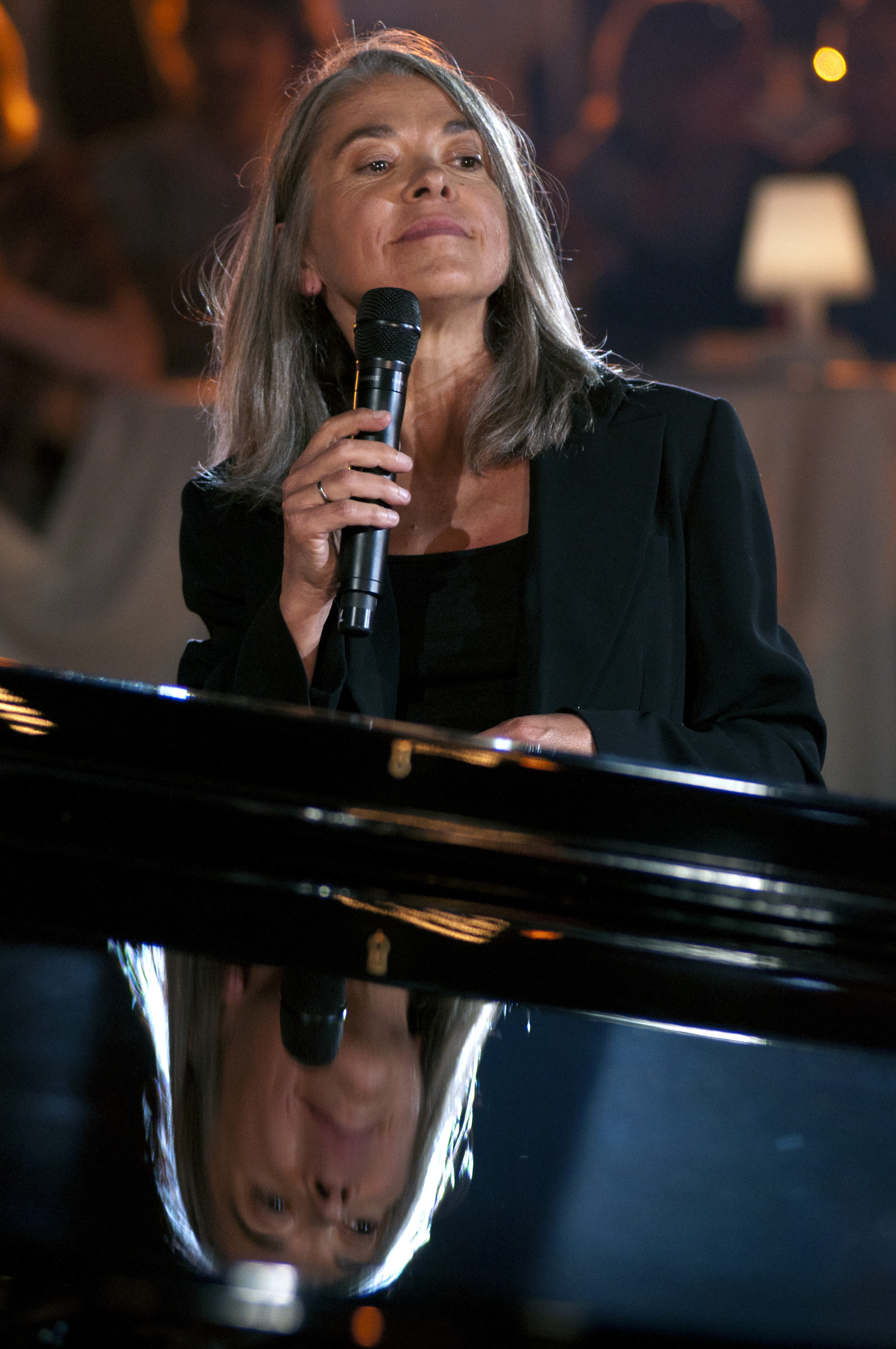

Background information
- Born: 25 January 1957 (age 68); Paris, France
- Genres: Jazz, electroacoustic music
- Instrument: Piano
- Years active: 1979–present
- Website: lesforcesenpresence.com

Sophia Domancich (born 25 January 1957) is a French pianist and jazz composer.

== Life and work ==
Domancich began learning piano at the age of six and attended the Conservatoire de Paris from 1968 to 1975 where she won first prize for piano and chamber music.

She began her career as an accompanist in vocal and dance lessons, such as the Paris Opera and the Théâtre de Caen.

In 1979 she met Steve Lacy, Bernard Lubat and Jean-Louis Chautemps who introduced her to the world of jazz and improvisation.

In 1982 she formed a duet with Laurent Cugny and joined the big band Lumiére (also containing Cugny). She later participated in Quoi D'Neuf Docteur? with Steve Grossman, Glenn Ferris and Jack Walrath.

In 1983 during a brief collaboration with the group Anaïd, she met several English musicians from the Canterbury scene: the former Gong drummer Pip Pyle (with whom she lived with for several years), and in the aftermath the former Soft Machine members Elton Dean (saxophone) and Hugh Hopper (bass). Together they formed the group L'Equip Out in late 1984, which included for a time as fifth member Didier Malherbe on the flute and the tenor saxophone. The group made two recordings and she played with them until 1991.

In 1986, she met Bernard Drouillet (drums) during a studio session, and he invited her to join the Trio Davenport created by Charles Calamel (double bass). She also played in the Quartet Hors-Série.

In 1990, L'Equip Out recorded a second album, Up!, with bassist Paul Rogers. With the latter and drummers Bruno Tocanne and Tony Levin, she formed the Sophia Domancich Trio with which she toured for eight years, including the London club Ronnie Scott's in 1992, and recorded five studio albums (mostly original compositions). Also with Rogers, she creates in 1995 a quartet with the original composition, including two trumpets (Patrick Fabert and Jean-François Canape).

In the 1990s, she also began collaborating with John Greaves (with whom she also recorded in the trio with Vincent Courtois Trouble with Happiness in 2002) and with Simon Goubert. In 1990, she participated in the album Little Bottle of Laundry from John Greaves (former bassist and singer of the experimental rock group Henry Cow). The collaboration continued with Songs (1995), partly sung by Robert Wyatt, and The Trouble With Happiness (2003), in trio with Vincent Courtois (cello).

From 1997 to 2000 she was a pianist under Didier Levallet in the Orchester National de Jazz.

In 1999, she became the first woman to receive the Prix Django Reinhardt from the Jazz Academy as French Musician of the Year

In 2000 she formed the Quintet Pentacle, with Simon Goubert, Jean-Luc Cappozzo, Claude Tchamitchian, Michel Marre, with whom she recorded two albums. In 2006 the Trio DAG (Domancich, Avenel, Goubert) was formed. The Trio DAG created three albums as a Trio and the album "free 4 DAG" with saxophonist Dave Liebman.

The electronic musician Fred Avril asked her in 2002 to remix his piece The Date. She then works with the sound designer Raphael Marc, with whom she composes Lilienmund, a concerto for piano and electronics inspired by a Schumann lieder, and works by Alban Berg, Qigang Chen.

In 2003 she formed the Flowers Trio with Ramón López and Joëlle Léandre.

In 2004 she formed the group Soft Bounds with Simon Goubert and two former colleagues of L'Equipe Out, Elton Dean and Hugh Hopper, a collaboration unfortunately cut short by the deaths of Dean in 2006 and Hopper in 2009.

In 2007, she released a duo album with Simon Goubert (You Do not Know What Love Is), and in 2010, she released an album mostly sung or recited entitled "Snakes & Ladders", including John Greaves and Himiko Paganotti, Robert Wyatt, Napoleon Maddox, Ramón López.

In 2007 the French Ministry of Foreign affairs combined with the Ministry of Culture and created the book 100 Jazz Titles, highlighting French Jazz Music. The book included Sophia's 2002 Pentacle Quintet release.

Her elder sister Lydia Domancich is also a jazz pianist.

== Discography ==
As leader :

- 1991 : Funerals, Sophia Domancich Trio (Gimini Music)
- 1993 : Rêve de singe, Sophia Domancich Trio (Gimini Music)
- 1995 : L'année des treize lunes, Sophia Domancich Trio (Seventh Records)
- 1997 : La part des anges, Sophia Domancich Trio (Gimini Music)
- 1999 : Rêves familiers, Sophia Domancich Solo (Gimini Music)
- 2003 : Pentacle, Quintet Pentacle (Sketch)
- 2007 : Triana Moods, Quintet Pentacle (Cristal Records)
- 2010 : Snakes and ladders, Sophia Domancich (Cristal Records)
- 2016 : Alice's Evidence, Sophia Domancich (Marge)
- 2017 : So, Sophia Domancich (Sans Bruit)

As co-leader :

- 2002 : That Horse Must Be Starving (The Date Remix), with Fred Avril (F Communications)
- 2005 : Avant, with Elton Dean (Hux)
- 2005 : Soft Bounds
- 2006 : DAG, with Jean-Jacques Avenel and Simon Goubert (Effendi)
- 2007 : You Don't Know What Love Is, with Simon Goubert (Cristal Records)
- 2008 : Washed Away, Live At The Sunside, with Hamid Drake and William Parker, Futura Marge
- 2011 : Courtepointe, Live At the Sunside, with Mark Helias and Andrew Cyrille, Futura Marge

As member :

- 1986 : Pip Pyle', Equipe Out (Voiceprint)
- 1988 : Davenport, Trio Davenport
- 1989 : Au-delà des limites, Lydia Domancich (Too Much)
- 1990 : Little Bottle of Laundry, John Greaves (Resurgent/Musea Distribution)
- 1990 : Up!, Equipe Out (United States Of Distribution LTD)
- 1994 : Thank You To Be, Peter Gritz
- 1994 : Songs, John Greaves (Le Chant du Monde)
- 1995 : Odessa, Bruno Tocanne Réunion (Night and Day)
- 1996 : Silent Knowledge, Elton Dean Quintet (Orkhestra)
- 1997 : Time of Brightness I, Paul Rogers Quartet (Rare Music)
- 1997 : ONJ Express, ONJ Didier Levallet
- 1999 : Living Alive, Stefano Maltese / Open Sound Ensemble (Leo Records)
- 1999 : New Shapes, Éric Barret (Charlotte)
- 1999 : Sequences, ONJ Didier Levallet
- 2000 : Deep Feelings, ONJ Didier Levallet (Frémeaux & Associés)
- 2001 : Désormais, Simon Goubert Quintet (Seventh New)
- 2004 : Le Cœur Allant Vers, Stella Vander
- 2005 : Flowers Of Peace, Ramón López / Flowers Trio (Orkhestra)
- 2005 : Et Après, Simon Goubert Quintet (Ex-Tension)
- 2008 : Background, Simon Goubert Sextet (Le Chant du Monde)
