= Leviathan (comic strip) =

- Levi, with Rabbit, discusses his sister's screaming with Cat
- Author: Peter Blegvad
- Launch date: 1992
- End date: 1999
- Publisher: The Independent on Sunday
- Genre: humor

Leviathan is a comic strip by Peter Blegvad, an American musician, singer-songwriter, and cartoonist. Between 1992 and 1999, it appeared in the review section of the British newspaper The Independent on Sunday.

== Plot ==
The title character, whose name is shortened in the strip to Levi, is drawn as a faceless baby who constantly carries a stuffed toy rabbit called either Bunny or Rabbit. A pet cat called Cat is often around to give advice. The strip describes Levi's experiences as he crawls around a surreal and often frightening landscape filled with disjointed words and objects, which perhaps reflect the incomprehensible nature of the world as seen by a baby, but which also raise philosophical questions of interest to adults.

== Collected editions ==
- The Book of Leviathan, Peter Blegvad, Overlook Press, ISBN 0-9535227-2-5
