= John Greaves (musician) =

British musician & composer (born 1950)

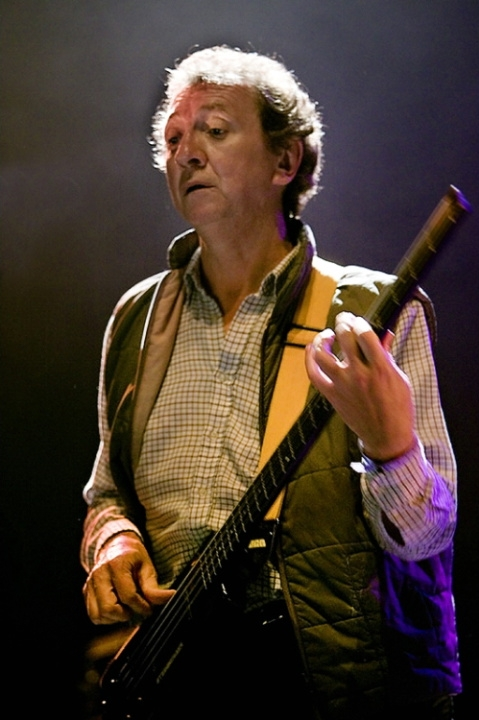
- Greaves with the Peter Blegvad Trio at a RIO Festival in France, 2007

Background information
- Born: 23 February 1950 (age 76); Prestatyn, Wales
- Genres: Progressive rock; experimental; jazz; pop
- Occupations: Musician; composer
- Instruments: Bass; keyboards; vocals
- Years active: 1969–present
- Label: Harmonia Mundi
- Formerly of: Henry Cow; National Health; The Lodge
- Website: johngreaves.org.uk

John Greaves (born 23 February 1950) is a Welsh bass guitarist, pianist and composer who was a member of Henry Cow and has collaborated with Peter Blegvad. He was also a member of progressive rock band National Health and jazz-rock supergroup Soft Heap, and has recorded several solo albums, including Accident (1982), Parrot Fashions (1984), The Caretaker (2001) and Greaves Verlaine (2008).

== Biography ==
Greaves was born in Prestatyn and grew up in Wrexham in northeast Wales. At the age of 12, he was given a bass guitar by his father, a Welsh dancehall bandleader, and within six months, he was playing in his father's orchestra. He continued playing in the orchestra for four years, during which time its varied musical styles gave Greaves valuable musician and arranger skills. He was educated at Grove Park Grammar School in Wrexham from 1961 to 1968.

In 1968 Greaves entered Pembroke College, Cambridge to study English. While at Cambridge, he met members of the burgeoning English avant-rock group Henry Cow in 1969. The band had been established the previous year by fellow Cambridge students Fred Frith and Tim Hodgkinson and had undergone numerous personnel changes up to that point. They were looking for a bassist and after several months of persuading, Greaves joined the band in October 1969. After juggling his time with the band and his studies, Greaves completed his Master of Arts degree in 1971. By the end of 1971, Henry Cow settled into a permanent core of Frith, Hodgkinson, Greaves and Chris Cutler. Greaves remained with the band until March 1976, toured Europe extensively with them (with his wife Sarah doing the sound-mix at many of their concerts), and appeared on five of their albums (including two with Slapp Happy). Greaves also contributed several compositions to the band's repertoire, including "Half Asleep; Half Awake", recorded on their second album, Unrest (1974). In November 1973, Greaves (and other members of Henry Cow) participated in a live-in-the-studio performance of Mike Oldfield's Tubular Bells for the BBC.

Greaves left Henry Cow to work on a project, Kew. Rhone. with Slapp Happy's Peter Blegvad in New York City. Greaves had met and worked with Blegvad during the brief merger of Henry Cow and Slapp Happy between November 1974 and April 1975, their first collaboration, "Bad Alchemy", appearing on the two bands' joint album Desperate Straights. Kew. Rhone. was a song cycle with all the music composed by Greaves and the lyrics written by Blegvad. In addition to bass guitar, Greaves also played keyboards and sang. The album was released in 1977 and credited to Greaves, Blegvad and Lisa Herman, the lead vocalist. It was well received by critics: AllMusic described it as "An unfortunately neglected masterpiece of '70s progressive rock ..."; and Robert Wyatt reportedly liked it so much he bought two copies "just in case the first got worn out!"

After Kew. Rhone. Greaves returned to England to work in theatre as a composer, arranger and actor. In early 1978 he joined National Health and remained with them until the band split up in 1980. He toured with the band, appearing on the album Of Queues and Cures, for which he wrote the instrumental tour-de-force "Squarer for Maud", the later reunion effort DS Al Coda (1982) and the archive release Play Time. During this time (1979–88) he also performed with a free-improvising group, Soft Heap with Elton Dean from Soft Machine, Pip Pyle from National Health, and maverick guitarist Mark Hewins.

In the early 1980s, Greaves began a series of solo projects and collaborations. Having secured a deal with independent French-American label Europa Records, he recorded his first solo album, Accident in Paris in 1981–82. He moved to France permanently in 1984, and formed a touring band with François Ovide (guitar and trombone), Denis van Hecke from Aksak Maboul (cello), Mireille Bauer (formerly of Gong) (stand-up drums and percussion) and Blegvad's brother, Kristoffer Blegvad (backing vocals). This line-up also featured on Greaves's second solo album, Parrot Fashions (1984). During this time he also recorded and/or toured with the Penguin Cafe Orchestra and the Michael Nyman Band. He reunited with Peter Blegvad again on The Lodge project (alongside Kristoffer Blegvad, Jakko Jakszyk and Anton Fier) which produced an album, Smell of a Friend in 1987 (but only ever performed live a couple of times).

For his next album, 1991's La Petite Bouteille de Linge (Little Bottle of Laundry), Greaves retained the services of Ovide on guitar, adding his old mate Pip Pyle on drums and the latter's then-partner, Sophia Domancich on piano. Over the next few years his music took on a more acoustic flavour and Greaves eventually settled on a drum-less line-up comprising Domancich, Ovide (now on acoustic guitar exclusively) and double bass player Paul Rogers (bassist). This resulted in the 1995 album Songs, which consisted largely of acoustic arrangements of songs from his previous efforts, going back to Kew.Rhone. Greaves himself only handled lead vocals on one track, "The Green Fuse" (based on a Dylan Thomas poem), leaving the spotlight to Robert Wyatt, opera singer Susan Belling, Kristoffer Blegvad and French pop singer Caroline Loeb. During the 1990s, Greaves also embarked on one-off collaborations with David Cunningham from The Flying Lizards, on 1991's greaves, cunningham album, and Peter Blegvad on 1995's Unearthed. He also played bass in Blegvad's own trio alongside Chris Cutler on drums, which recorded two studio albums, later expanding into a quintet with Bob Drake on guitar and Karen Mantler on organ.

In the early 2000s Greaves led two contrasting trios, an electric one named Roxongs with François Ovide on guitar (later replaced by Patrice Meyer then Jef Morin) and Manu Denizet on drums, heard on 2001's The Caretaker, and an acoustic one named Jazzsongs, with Sophia Domancich on piano and Vincent Courtois on cello, heard on 2003's The Trouble With Happiness, once again a mixture of old and new songs, but this time with Greaves himself singing all the way through.

Originally intended as a follow-up of sorts to the acclaimed Songs, 2004's Chansons saw Greaves team up with lyricist Christophe Glockner and vocalist Elise Caron for a collection of all-new songs with predominantly acoustic instrumentation, including guest spots by Robert Wyatt and Louis Sclavis.

During the same period, Greaves appeared as the featured vocalist on a number of projects. He contributed lyrics and vocals to two songs on saxophonist Julien Lourau's acclaimed Fire & Forget (2005), to much of Sophia Domancich's Snakes & Ladders (2010) sharing the microphone with Himiko Paganotti and Robert Wyatt, and sang all the vocals on Alain Blésing's Songs From The Beginning project, revisiting 1970s progressive rock classics by King Crimson, Soft Machine, Henry Cow and Hatfield and the North among others, Catherine Delaunay's Sois Patient Car Le Loup (2011), the French clarinettist's settings of texts by Malcolm Lowry, and Post Image's In an English Garden (2012), a special project celebrating the jazz-fusion group's 25th anniversary. Having had two of his songs used by the Daniel Yvinec-led edition of the Orchestre National de Jazz's tribute to Robert Wyatt, Greaves fulfilled a lifelong dream by fronting the ONJ at the legendary Theatre du Chatelet in Paris in January 2011, singing several Billie Holiday songs either solo or alongside Sandra Nkaké.

In 2005, Greaves released an album under the banner Maman with Jef Morin and Morin's partner in Les Recycleurs de Bruits, Nico Mizrahi (machines). Around the same time, he began work on what turned out to be a decade-long series of projects based on the work and life of French poet Paul Verlaine (1844–1896). He made two albums of his own settings of Verlaine poems with a decidedly un-retro aesthetic conceived in cooperation with Les Recycleurs de Bruits : Greaves Verlaine (2008) and Greaves Verlaine 2 (2011). In addition to his Roxongs bandmates, the album featured regular collaborators Jeanne Added (vocals) and Scott Taylor (accordion, trumpet), as well as appearances by Karen Mantler and Dominique Pifarély. Concerts promoting these albums saw Greaves accompanied by line-ups ranging from just Taylor on accordion to a full electric septet.

In 2012, Greaves embarked on yet another Verlaine project, this time composing to an original libretto by Emmanuel Tugny and teaming up with a trio of French vocalists, Elise Caron, Jeanne Added and Thomas de Pourquery. Verlaine Gisant was premiered in December 2012 at Le Triton following a residency at the venue, was subsequently performed at the Orléans Jazz Festival and at Les Sables-d'Olonnes, and a studio album was released in April 2015 on Bruno Letort's Signature label, coinciding with a live broadcast of a performance at the Maison de la Radio.

Following the death of Henry Cow bassoonist/oboist and composer Lindsay Cooper in 2013, Greaves, along with surviving members of the group and other Cooper collaborators, participated in three memorial concerts of her music in England and Italy in late 2014. Subsequently, Greaves took part in some performances by Half The Sky, a smaller ensemble formed by pianist Yumi Hara and featuring other Henry Cow alumni. Greaves has also played fully improvised sets with Fred Frith and Chris Cutler in 2019, and with the addition of Tim Hodgkinson in 2022 the resulting quartet, still performing exclusively improvised sets, adopted the monicker Henry Now, but Greaves has since been replaced by trombonist/bassist Annemarie Roelofs. Another improvising unit including fellow Henry Cow alumni was The Artaud Beats, formed in 2009 and consisting of Greaves, Cutler, Geoff Leigh and Yumi Hara. Greaves is also a special guest in French flautist Michel Edelin's Echoes of Henry Cow project. Greaves recites texts (mostly by Cutler) over variations on Henry Cow and Art Bears music re-interpreted by a jazz quintet which includes former collaborators Sophia Domancich, Sylvain Kassap and Simon Goubert.

In 2015, Greaves began a partnership with Italian producer Max Marchini, founder of the Dark Companion label and in charge of the revived Manticore Records label, and singer Annie Barbazza. A solo performance in May 2015 was released as Piacenza, and in 2018 a new studio album, Life Size, a mixture of new and old songs (including a cover of Matching Mole's "God Song" and an Italian cover of "Rose C'Est La Vie", entitled "In Te") with guests including Zeena Parkins, Jakko Jakszyk, and Annie Barbazza. He has partnered with Barbazza for duo gigs, as documented on the live album Earthly Powers, which includes covers of Bob Dylan and Leonard Cohen and a new song each by the performers. Greaves also appears on Barbazza's solo album Vive (2020).

In early 2020, Greaves celebrated his 70th birthday with a Sunday night residency at La Gare Jazz in Paris, with a rotating line-up of many of his longtime collaborators. More recently, Les Rendez-Vous de Greaves has been the banner for regular gigs at Le Studio L'Accord Parfait, also in Paris.

Greaves has performed (bass and occasional vocals) in Folly Bololey, a reinterpretation of Robert Wyatt's Rock Bottom by the North Sea Radio Orchestra, premiered in 2014 at the Nuits de Fourvière festival, with Annie Barbazza as principal vocalist and other guests including William D. Drake (Cardiacs). A live performance in Piacenza in 2018 was released on Dark Companion in 2019, and other performances followed including a live broadcast at the Maison de la Radio in Paris that December.

Zones, again for Radio France's Signature label, was released in October 2022. In it, Greaves set texts by Guillaume Apollinaire, alongside fellow vocalists Jeanne Added and Himiko Paganotti, with guitarist Olivier Mellano, another regular collaborator, in the co-producer's chair. Greaves has taken part in various projects by Mellano over the past decade, notably Ici-Bas - Les Mélodies de Gabriel Fauré with Mellano's BAUM project and various other vocalists (performed in the Cour d'Honneur at the Avignon Festival in 2018), and H'art Songs, based on Moondog's eponymous 1978 set of songs for dual pianos, percussion and five vocalists.

Greaves, Mellano and drummer Régis Boulard also perform as a rock trio under the name Gloyw, playing both improvised and composed music with texts, with an album due for release in May 2024. Greaves has also formed an acoustic, as yet unnamed trio with himself on piano and vocals, longtime collaborator Laurent Valéro (viola) and Mirabelle Gilis (violin, viola), a collaborator of Hakim Hamadouche (which whom Greaves has also performed) and Miossec. Playing songs from Zones as well as older material, the trio recorded a studio album in 2024.

On August 5th 2023, Greaves and Friends, featuring Jakko Jakszyk and the latter's King Crimson bandmate Mel Collins, along with Barbazza, Valero and Boulard, played a one-off concert in Piacenza. The John Greaves Band, with Annie Whitehead replacing Valero, played further gigs in Italy in 2024. Other releases in 2024 include an instrumental album, Timelines, and an appearance (again with Barbazza) on Michael Mantler's New Songs Ensemble. The ensemble recorded an album for John's Italian Avantgarde label Dark Companion, called "Sempre Notte" and performed with the ensemble in September 2024 in Vienna and January 2025 in Italy (Piacenza, Siena and Rome).

== Private life ==
John Greaves presently lives in Paris with artist Laura Buxton and their two daughters, Ailsa Grace and Millie. He also has a son, Ben, from his first marriage.

== Discography ==
- 1977 – Kew. Rhone. (with Peter Blegvad and Lisa Herman) (Virgin)
- 1982 – Accident (Europa)
- 1984 – Parrot Fashions (Europa)
- 1991 – La Petite Bouteille de Linge (La Lichère)
- 1991 – greaves, cunningham (with David Cunningham) (Eva)
- 1995 – Unearthed (with Peter Blegvad) (Sub Rosa)
- 1995 – Songs (Resurgence)
- 2001 – The Caretaker (Blueprint)
- 2001 – On the Street Where You Live (with Marcel Ballot and Patrice Meyer) (Blueprint)
- 2001 – Loco Solo: Live In Tokyo (live) (Locus Solus)
- 2003 – The Trouble With Happiness (Le Chant du Monde)
- 2004 – Chansons (with Elise Caron) (Le Chant du Monde)
- 2005 – Tambien 1–7 (instrumental) (Resurgence)
- 2008 – Greaves Verlaine (ZigZag Territoires/Harmonia Mundi)
- 2012 – Greaves Verlaine 2 (Cristal/Harmonia Mundi)
- 2015 – Verlaine Gisant (Signature/France Musique)
- 2015 – Piacenza (live) (Dark Companion)
- 2018 – Life Size (Manticore)
- 2020 – Passage Du Nord Ouest (live) (Dark Companion)
- 2022 – Zones (Signature/France Musique)
- 2023 – Earthly Powers (live) (with Annie Barbazza) (Dark Companion)
- 2024 – Timelines (instrumental) (Radiofrance - Signature / Radiophonie)
- 2026 – Chansons D'automne (Dark Companion)

=== Bands ===
With Henry Cow

- 1973 – Legend (Virgin)
- 1974 – Unrest (Virgin)
- 1975 – In Praise of Learning (Virgin)
- 1975 – Desperate Straights (with Slapp Happy) (Virgin)
- 1976 – Concerts (Compendium/Caroline)
- 2009 – The 40th Anniversary Henry Cow Box Set (RéR)
- 2019 – The Henry Cow Box Redux: The Complete Henry Cow (RéR)

With The Lodge

- 1987 – Smell of a Friend (Antilles)

With National Health

- 1978 – Of Queues and Cures (Charly)
- 1982 – D.S. Al Coda (Europa)
- 2001 – Play Time (live 1979) (Cuneiform)

With Pip Pyle and Philippe Marcel Iung

- 2001 – The Pig Part (Blueprint)

With The Artaud Beats

- 2015 – Logos (Bonobo's Ark Records)

With Henry Now

- 2025 - Then Again (Dark Companion)

=== As guest ===
With Peter Blegvad

- 1983 – The Naked Shakespeare (Virgin)
- 1985 – Knights Like This (Virgin)
- 1988 – Downtime (RéR)
- 1995 – Just Woke Up (RéR)
- 1998 – Hangman's Hill (RéR)
- 2017 – Go Figure (with Chris Cutler, Karen Mantler and Bob Drake) (RéR)

With Catherine Delaunay

- 2011 – Sois Patient Car Le Loup (Les Neuf Filles de Zeus)

With Sophia Domancich

- 1991 – Funerals (Gimini Music)
- 2010 – Snakes and Ladders (Cristal/Harmonia Mundi)

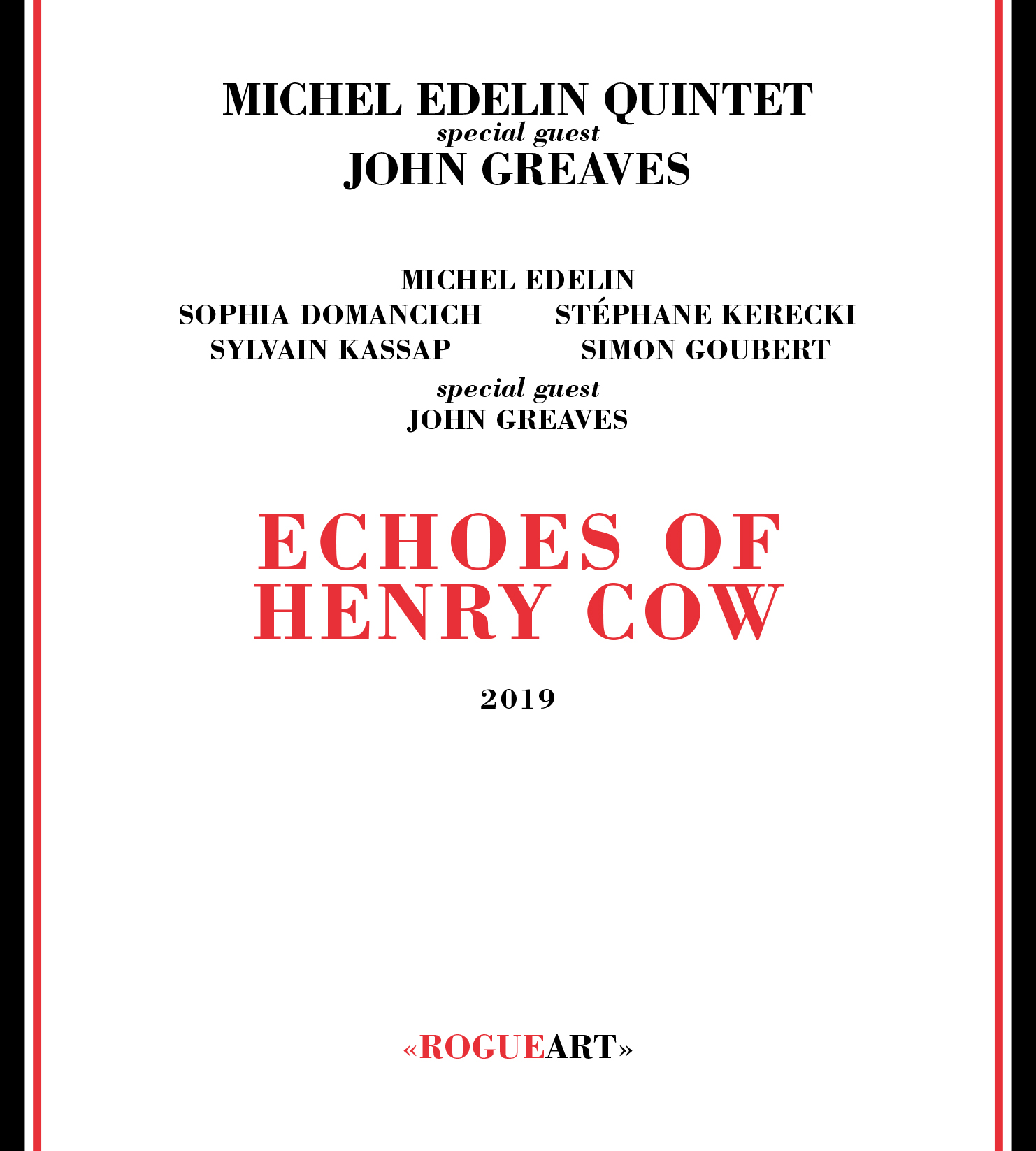
Echoes of Henry Cow by the Michel Edelin Quintet with John Greaves

With Michel Edelin Quintet

- 2019 – Echoes of Henry Cow (RogueArt)

With Julien Lourau

- 2005 – Fire and Forget (Label Bleu)

With Michael Mantler

- 1987 – Live (Watt/ECM)
- 1997 – The School of Understanding (Watt/ECM)
- 2024 – Sempre notte (Dark Companion) with Annie Barbazza

With the North Sea Radio Orchestra

- 2019 – Foley Bolloly (Dark Companion)

With Michael Nyman Band

- 1985 – The Kiss and Other Movements (EG)

With Pip Pyle

- 1998 – Seven Year Itch (Voiceprint)

With Post Image

- 2012 – In an English Garden (Aqui Label Musique)

With Silvain Vanot

- 2009 – Bethesda (Coopérative Music/Pias)

With Robert Wyatt

- 1975 – Ruth Is Stranger Than Richard (Virgin)

With Annie Barbazza

- 2020 – Vive (Dark Companion)
