= Édouard Ferlet =

French jazz pianist

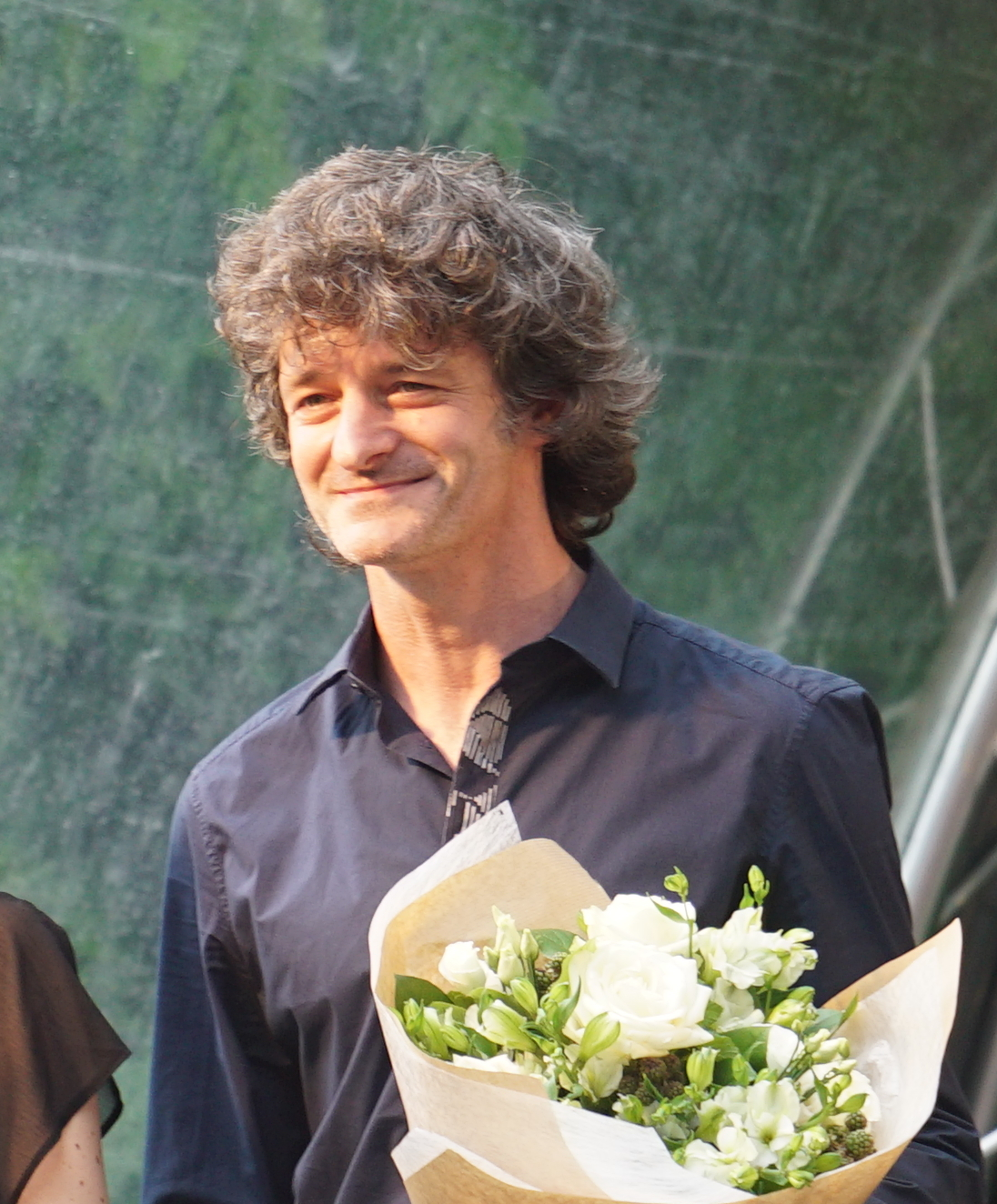
- Ferlet in 2016

Background information
- Born: 1971 (age 54–55)
- Origin: France
- Genres: Jazz, Classical music
- Occupations: Composer, Bandleader, Pianist
- Instrument: Piano
- Years active: 1992 – present
- Label: Melisse
- Website: ferlet.com

Édouard Ferlet is a French jazz pianist.

== Early years ==
Ferlet began playing piano at the age of 7 and studied classical music at l’École Normale de Musique de Paris, and later on at the Conservatoire regional. In the late eighties, he moved to Boston, US, and studied piano under Herb Pomeroy, Hal Crook, Ed Tomassi, Ray Santisi and Ed Bedner. In 1992, he graduated from the Berklee College of Music in Jazz Composition and was awarded the Berklee jazz performance award.

== Career ==
Back in France, he worked as a composer for a variety of TV programs. He recorded two albums under his name: Escale and Zazimut featuring key artists of the new European jazz generation: Médéric Collignon, Christophe Monniot, Simon Spang-Hanssen, Claus Stotter, François Verly, Gary Brunton.

In 2000, he met the bassist Jean-Philippe Viret with whom he recorded three albums in 6 years (Considérations, Étant Donnés and L’Indicible), as well as a DVD and a CD distributed exclusively in Japan. In a few years, this trio, under the label Sketch, was nominated for the Django d'or, les Victoires de la Musique (French Grammy Awards). At the same time, he continued to play with singers from various backgrounds: Mark Murphy in Jazz, Manda Djin in Gospel, Geoffrey Oryema in World Music and Lambert Wilson in cabaret. He conducted the musical direction for Julia Migenes' show Alter Ego, which tour all over the world: China, Canada, Germany, Spain, France. He received praise for his sensitivity and his artistic commitment.

== Melisse ==
In 2006 Édouard Ferlet and Benjamin Gratton founded Melisse, a French contemporary jazz label. The label supports Ferlet's and other innovative jazzmen's works who share the same musical vision, and has produced albums by Issam Krimi, the Jean-Philippe Viret Trio, François Raulin /Stéphan Oliva, as well as Édouard Ferlet himself.

== Discography ==
- Réflections (1996), with Marc Buronfosse
- Escale (1997)
- Zazimut (1999)
- Considérations (2000), with Jean-Philippe Viret and Antoine Banville
- French Cricket (2002), with Brunt'Off (Gary Brunton's band)
- Étant Donnés (2002), with Jean-Philippe Viret and Antoine Banville
- Par Tous Les Temps (2004)
- L'Écharpe d'Iris (2007)
- Think Bach (2012)
- Think Bach Op.2 (2017)
