= Salim Ghazi Saeedi =

Iranian composer and guitarist (born 1981)

Salim Ghazi Saeedi سلیم قاضی‌سعیدی
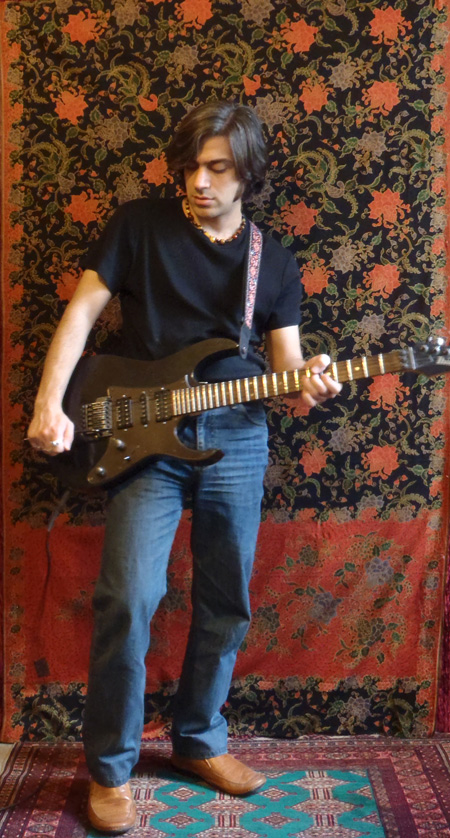
- Saeedi in 2011

Background information
- Born: 19 July 1981 (age 45); Tehran, Iran
- Genres: Progressive rock; Rock in Opposition; jazz fusion; art rock
- Occupations: Composer, guitarist
- Instruments: Guitar, keyboards
- Years active: 2006–present
- Label: Independent
- Member of: Arashk
- Website: salimworld.com

Salim Ghazi Saeedi (Persian: سلیم قاضی‌سعیدی, also Romanized as Salim Ghāzi Saeedi and Salim Ghāzi-Saeedi; born 1981) is an Iranian composer and guitarist who plays a variety of genres ranging from progressive metal, jazz fusion, avant-garde classical chamber, progressive surf, progressive rock, RIO (Rock in Opposition), to art rock with a minimalist approach.

== Biography ==
Saeedi was born in 1981 in Tehran, Iran. He began teaching himself to play guitar in 1999. He has composed three albums with the band Arashk: Abrahadabra (2006), Sovereign (2007), and Ustuqus-al-Uss (2008). He subsequently released the solo albums Iconophobic (2010), Human Encounter (2011), and namoWoman (2012). The albums were entirely self-produced, with Saeedi laying down guitar and keyboards, drum arrangements, and mixing. On namoWoman, he incorporates Persian microtonal music influences.

Some critics have compared his sound to Univers Zero, Art Zoyd, John Zorn, Patrick O'Hearn, Mike Oldfield, Djam Karet, Birdsongs of the Mesozoic, David Bedford, Richard Pinhas, ZNR, Mecano, Present, Aranis, the entire Belgian chamber rock scene, Dick Dale, Anne Dudley, Jaz Coleman, and X-Legged Sally.

Some progressive rock publications have also compared his music to King Crimson and Robert Fripp.

== Discography ==
moW - namoWoman (2012) - Salim Ghazi Saeedi
track "moW", namoWoman album (2012) by Salim Ghazi Saeedi

Solo

- Iconophobic (2010)
- Human Encounter (2011)
- namoWoman (2012)
- United Ubiquity of Flesh (2017)

with Arashk

- Abrahadabra (2006)
- Sovereign (2007)
- Ustuqus-al-Uss (2008)
- Yell (2008)

Collaborations

- "When There Is More Beauty in the Contrary" – Negar Bouban & Salim Ghazi Saeedi (2011)
