= The Red Masque =

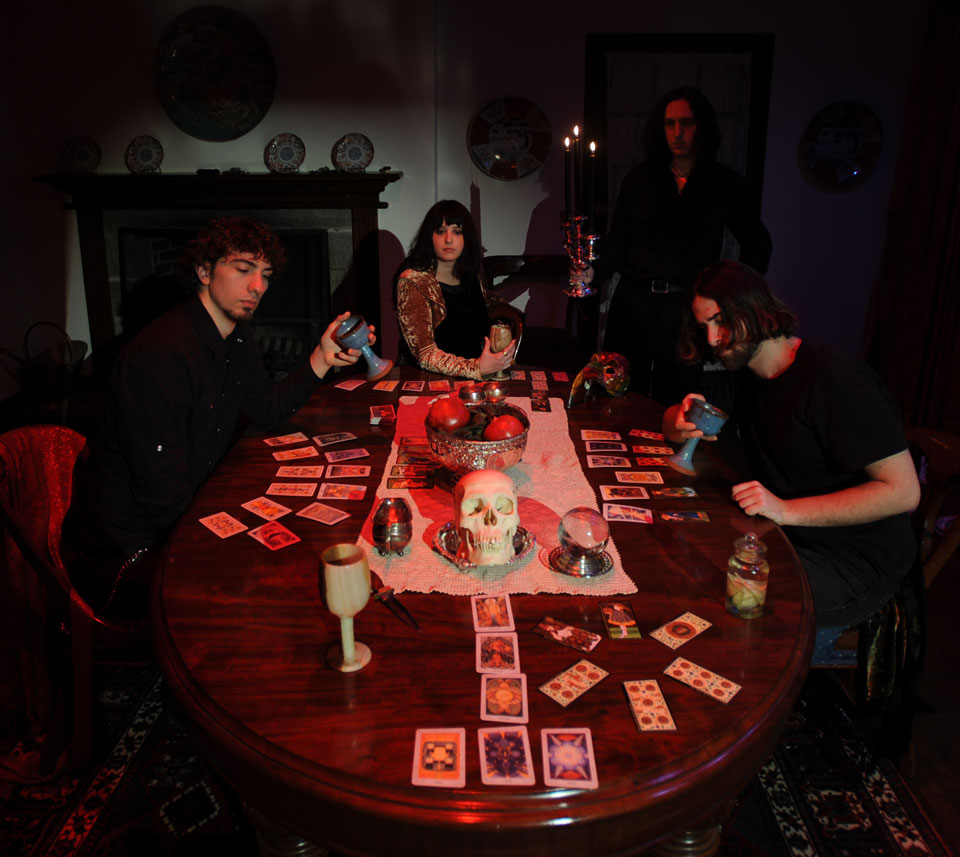

Background information
- Origin: Philadelphia, Pennsylvania, United States
- Genres: Progressive rock Art rock
- Years active: 2001–present
- Labels: ReR USA, Beta-lactam Ring Records
- Members: Brandon Ross; Lynnette Shelley; Jim Harris; Scott Weingarten
- Past members: Steven Blumberg; Brian Van Korn; Andrew Kowal; Nathan-Andrew Dewin; Kiarash Emami; Kevin Kelly; Nicholas Giannetti; Steve Craig; Glenn Kuchenbeiser; James Tunnicliffe; David Carle
- Website: Official website

The Red Masque is an avant-garde rock band from Philadelphia, Pennsylvania.

== Biography ==
The Red Masque was founded by vocalist Lynnette Shelley and bassist Brandon Ross in February 2001, incorporating elements of psychedelia, heavy rock, rock-in-opposition, zeuhl, gothic, and kraut rock. One of the group's first concerts was at the Prelude to the 2001 North East Art Rock Festival (NEARFest); other notable shows have included the 2005 The Rogue Independent Music Festival in Atlanta, the 2001 WorldCon Science Fiction Convention, and the NJ Proghouse concert series.

The Red Masque has opened for notable performers and musicians such as Chris Cutler (Henry Cow, Art Bears), The Muffins, Sleepytime Gorilla Museum, Present, Martin Bisi and Julie Slick. In 2006, Dave Kerman (of Present, 5uus, Thinking Plague, etc.) and Paul Sears (of The Muffins and Thee Maximalists) performed with the band on stage as guest drummers/percussionists at the NJ Proghouse.

The Red Masque has released one EP (Death of the Red Masque in 2001), and four albums (Victoria and the Haruspex in 2002, Feathers for Flesh in 2004, Fossil Eyes in 2008, and Stars Fall On Me in 2009). Feathers for Flesh was released through Big Balloon Music, and has been favorably reviewed in such publications as The Wire (issue no. 248) and Harmonie Magazine (issue no. 52). Fossil Eyes and Stars Fall On Me were both released through ReR USA, while Mythalogue was released through Beta-lactam Ring Records. Their album Fathomless was self-released.

Shelley has performed on other progressive/space rock-oriented albums as a guest vocalist, including Magus (on the album The Garden), Church of Hed (space rock project by Quarkspace founder Paul Williams; Shelley performs on their debut album under the moniker "Sister Mary Haruspex"), and Ethereal (on the album Beyond Neptune; Ethereal is a solo project by former Alien Planetscapes member Richard Orlando). In June 2007, Shelley performed as a guest vocalist with Bob Drake during his set at NEARfest. Shelley is also the lead vocalist in art rock band Green Cathedral, who released their debut album, Winter's Veil, in late 2017. She is also a professional visual artist.

Ross has composed two soundtrack pieces for the website of Karl Welz, inventor of Orgonite and Orgone Radionics.

== Members ==
- Lynnette Shelley – vocals, percussion
- Brandon Ross – bass, keyboards
- Jim Harris – drums
- Scott Weingarten – guitar

=== Former members ===
- David Carle – guitar
- James Tunnicliffe – violin
- Glenn Kuchenbeiser – guitar
- Nicholas Giannetti – guitar
- Steve Craig – drums
- Brian "Vonorn" Van Korn – drums, keyboards, theremin
- Andrew Kowal – guitar, mandolin, violin
- Kevin Kelly – drums
- Steven Blumberg – guitars
- Nathan-Andrew Dewin – keyboards, concert harp, percussion
- Kiarash Emami – guitar, mandolin.

== Discography ==
- Death of the Red Masque EP (2001)
- Victoria and the Haruspex (2002)
- Feathers for Flesh (2004)
- Fossil Eyes (2008)
- Stars Fall On Me (live album) (2009)
- Mythalogue (2013)
- Live at the Kennett Flash (live album) (2018)
- Fathomless (2018)
