= Uzed =

Studio album by Univers Zero
- Released: 1984
- Genre: Rock in Opposition
- Length: 43:04
- Label: Cuneiform
- Producer: Univers Zero and Madrigal

Univers Zero chronology
Crawling Wind (1983)	Uzed (1984)	Heatwave (1986)

Professional ratings
Review scores
Source	Rating
allmusic	3.5/5 stars

Uzed is the fourth album by Belgian RIO band Univers Zero. Due to a packed touring schedule, the band released this work three years after their previous album proper, Ceux du Dehors (although the Crawling Wind EP was released in the interim). This record marked an important stylistic shift for the band. The synthesizers which had been more moderately employed on Ceux du Dehors (and not at all in previous works) became much more prevalent on this release. In fact, the album opens with a synthesizer riff. Along with using more electric sounds, Univers Zero began to take inspiration from Middle Eastern musical themes, especially on the album's opener, "Présage." The new sound was partially attributable to the addition of some new band members. André Mergen's cello work provided some new textures for the ensemble. Michael Delory became the first guitarist employed by the band since the departure of co-founder Roger Trigaux after Heresie. Delory, unlike Trigaux, would play electric guitar with UZ. On Uzed, he plays a notable and unexpected guitar solo at the end of "Célesta (For Chantal)." Jean-Luc Plouvier was the primary keyboardist for this album, and would form a combo within the band with fellow keyboardist Andy Kirk. Kirk would play on and write most of the material for the next UZ album, Heatwave.

The album was recorded and mixed by Didier de Roos at Daylight Studio, Brussels.

== Track listing ==
All tracks are written by Daniel Denis

No.	Title	Length
1.	"Présage"	9:52
2.	"L'Étrange Mixture du Docteur Schwartz"	3:56
3.	"Célesta (For Chantal)"	6:55
4.	"Parade"	6:39
5.	"Emanations"	15:42
Total length:		43:04

== Personnel ==
- Daniel Denis: drums, percussion, synthesizer
- Dirk Descheemaeker: soprano sax, clarinet, bass clarinet
- Christian Genet: bass guitar, balafon, bowed guitar, tapes, whistle
- André Mergen: cello, alto sax, voice
- Jean-Luc Plouvier: electric and acoustic pianos, synthesizers, piano string, percussion

Also with:

- Michael Delory: electric guitar (on "Célesta (For Chantal)")
- Mark Verbist: violin (on "Célesta (For Chantal)")
