= RoqueForte =

Studio album by Aranis
- Released: 21 September 2010
- Recorded: March–April 2010
- Studios: Madam Fortuna, Borgerhout, Antwerp, Belgium
- Genres: Avant-rock, experimental, neo-classical chamber, minimalism
- Length: 58:22
- Label: Home Records

Aranis chronology
Songs from Mirage (2009)	RoqueForte (2010)	Made in Belgium (2012)

RoqueForte is a 2010 studio album by Flemish acoustic avant-rock, experimental and neo-classical chamber music group Aranis, led by composer and contrabass player Joris Vanvinckenroye. It is their fourth album and was released in Belgium by Home Records.

The album includes guest musicians Dave Kerman (drums) from Thinking Plague and Present, and Pierre Chevalier (keyboards) from Univers Zero and Present. The inclusion of a drummer on RoqueForte is a departure from Aranis' previous "signature drummerless acoustic sound".

== Reception ==
Professional ratings
Review scores
Source	Rating
AllMusic	4/5 stars
Babyblaue Seiten	11/15 stars
The Rocktologist	7/10

In a review at AllMusic, Dave Lynch called RoqueForte Aranis' "finest recording thus far", and described the music as their "most varied … to date". He said that Joris Vanvinckenroye's compositions here are "uniquely beautiful and powerful", and complimented rock drummer Dave Kerman's restraint on this "chamberesque – and at times nearly orchestral" album.

Writing at Progressor, Vitaly Menshikov described the album as "truly astonishing", and "highly recommended to all 'serious' progressive music lovers". A reviewer in The Rocktologist magazine was a little more critical of the album, saying that while he has enjoyed Aranis' music, he felt that some of the compositions on RoqueForte tend to be similar in structure to their earlier work, and that the arrangements are often a little "too condensed", leaving "hardly any spaces for the music to take on more atmosphere".

== Track listing ==
All tracks are written by Joris Vanvinckenroye.

No.	Title	Length
1.	"Roque"	5:54
2.	"Ade I"	1:03
3.	"Past"	5:31
4.	"Ade II"	1:33
5.	"Noise"	11:46
6.	"Ade III"	1:17
7.	"Naise"	10:54
8.	"Ade IV"	2:31
9.	"Tissim"	5:54
10.	"Aila"	8:12
11.	"Forte"	3:08
12.	"Ps"	0:56
Total length:		58:22

Source: Liner notes, AllMusic, Discogs.

== Personnel ==
- Joris Vanvinckenroye – composer, double bass
- Jana Arns – flutes
- Liesbeth Lambrecht – violin
- Stefan Wellens – viola
- Marjolein Cools – accordion
- Pierre Chevalier – piano
- Stijn Denys – guitar
- Dave Kerman – drums, percussion

Source: Liner notes, AllMusic, Discogs.

== Recording notes ==
Recorded March–April 2010 at Madam Fortuna, Borgerhout, Antwerp, Belgium

- Pieter Thys – engineer
- Flavio Marredda – mastering, mixing
- Joris En Jana – mastering, mixing
- Liesbeth Lambrecht – layout
- Iris Thissen – photography

Source: Liner notes, AllMusic, Discogs.
