= Arashk (band) =

Iranian hard rock/metal band

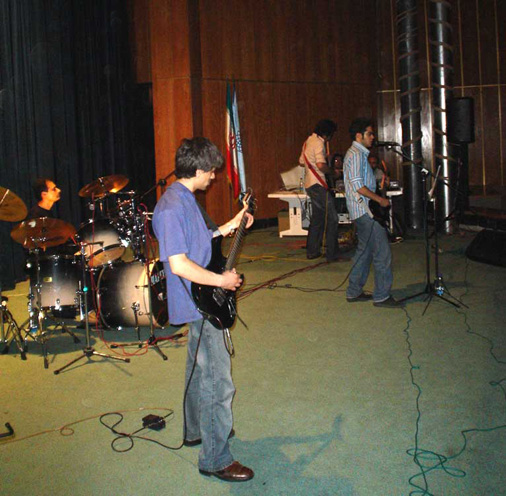

Background information
- Origin: Iran, Tehran
- Genres: Progressive metal, progressive rock, Persian rock
- Years active: 2001–2008
- Labels: Independent
- Members: Pouyan Khajavi; Shahram Khosraviani; Salim Ghazi Saeedi
- Past members: AmirMehdi JahanShahlou
- Website: www.arashkband.com

Arashk was an Iranian hard rock/metal band that were active between 2004-2008 and based in Tehran.

== History ==
Arashk was formed in 2001 by vocalist/guitarist Pouyan Khajavi and drummer Shahram Khosraviani in Tehran, Iran. In 2004, Salim Ghazi Saeedi joined the band. Their live performances consisted of occasional concerts at universities in Iran. The band released a total of four albums: Abrahadabra (2006), Sovereign (2007) and Ustuqus-al-Uss (2008) (which were composed by Salim Ghazi Saeedi), and YELL (2008), which was composed mainly by Pouyan Khajavai and Shahram Khosraviani. Salim Ghazi Saeedi played secondary guitars on YELL, and recorded and mixed the album. The band became inactive after their 2008 release due to limited chances for live performances in Iran. Salim Ghazi Saeedi continued as a one-man-band under his own name.

== Discography ==
- Abrahadabra (2006)
- Sovereign (2007)
- Ustuqus-al-Uss (2008)
- YELL (2008)

== Style ==
The albums Abrahadabra, Sovereign and Ustuqus-al-Uss are instrumental with influences of progressive rock, progressive metal, rock in opposition, acid jazz and has been compared to "progressive phase of Rush", King Crimson, Univers Zero.

Arashk albums also incorporate Arabian and Iranian music influences blended with rock format. Gnosis2000 webzine called Arashk's debut album, Abrahadabra, "the Ultima Thule of instrumental progressive metal".

Their fourth release, YELL is a hard rock album with Persian vocals with poems from Ferdowsi, Masud Sa'd Salman, Mehdi Akhavan-Sales, Saadi.

Arashk Band logo
