= Heatwave (Univers Zero album) =

Studio album by Univers Zero
- Released: 1987
- Genre: Rock in Opposition
- Length: 42:12
- Label: Cuneiform

Univers Zero chronology
Uzed (1984)	Heatwave (1987)	The Hard Quest (1999)

Professional ratings
Review scores
Source	Rating
allmusic	3.5/5 stars

Heatwave is the fifth album by Belgian RIO band Univers Zero. Released in 1987, the album is a continued exploration of the Middle Eastern influences, which first appeared on Uzed. The instrumentation here is more electronic than in their previous works. The album was recorded and mixed by Didier de Roos at Daylight Studio, Brussels.

The album is unusual among Univers Zero albums in that drummer/bandleader Daniel Denis did not write the majority of the material. Keyboardist Andy Kirk takes the compositional lead instead, penning both the title track and "The Funeral Plain." The latter is notable for being the second longest Univers Zero song (Only the track "La Faulx", off the Heresie album, is longer). "The Funeral Plain" is dedicated to "all living hardships that lead into self-awareness." The band would not release their next album, The Hard Quest, until 1999. Denis temporarily broke up the band after the release of Heatwave due to financial difficulties and tension within the group.

== Track listing ==
Side one
No.	Title	Writer(s)	Length
1.	"Heatwave"	Andy Kirk	8:37
2.	"Chinavox"	Daniel Denis	4:53
3.	"Bruit dans les Murs"	Denis	8:27

Side two
No.	Title	Writer(s)	Length
1.	"The Funeral Plain"	Kirk	20:22

== Personnel ==
• Michael Delory: electric guitar
• Daniel Denis: drums, percussion, voice
• Dirk Descheemaeker: clarinet, bass clarinet, soprano sax
• Christian Genet: bass guitar, nailskake
• Patrick Hanappier: violin, viola
• Andy Kirk: piano, synthesizer, voice
• Jean-Luc Plouvier: piano, synthesizer, voice
