= 1313 (album) =

Studio album by Univers Zéro
- Released: 1977
- Recorded: August 2–4, 1977
- Genres: Progressive rock; Rock in Opposition
- Length: 38:04

Univers Zéro chronology
1313 (1977)	Heresie (1979)

Professional ratings
Review scores
Source	Rating
AllMusic	4/5 stars

1313 is the first album by Belgian RIO band Univers Zero, released in 1977. The original vinyl release (and 2008 remix by Didier de Roos, with bonus live track) was simply titled Univers Zero – it acquired the name 1313 because of its original catalog number. The name stuck due to its connection with the later Present release entitled Triskaidekaphobie (fear of the number 13).

== Track listing ==
All tracks are written by Daniel Denis, except where noted.

No.	Title	Length
1.	"Ronde"	15:13
2.	"Carabosse"	3:46
3.	"Docteur Petiot" (Roger Trigaux)	7:45
4.	"Malaise" (Roger Trigaux)	7:58
5.	"Complainte"	3:27

== Personnel ==
- Michel Berckmans: bassoon
- Daniel Denis: percussion
- Patrick Hanappier: violin, viola, pocket cello
- Roger Trigaux: guitar
- Emmanuel Nicaise: harmonium, spinet
- Christian Genet: double bass
- Marcel Dufrane: violin
