= Un biglietto del tram =

Studio album by Stormy Six
- Released: 1975
- Recorded: March 1975
- Studio: Ariston Studios
- Genre: Progressive rock, progressive folk
- Label: L'Orchestra
- Producer: Stormy Six, Massimo Villa

Stormy Six chronology
Guarda giù dalla pianura (1974)	Un biglietto del tram (1975)	Cliché (1976)

Un biglietto del tram is the fourth studio album by the Italian progressive rock band Stormy Six. It was released in 1975.

The climate for the release of this record (among other things, one of the first "independent" outputs) is the years of lead and politicization of every aspect of life. Stormy Six represented the official voice of the student movement in Milan (or what remained of it), by far the groups' most important challenge of 1968. The concept of the work is related to the struggle for liberation from Nazi barbarism; all the songs have descriptions of facts (or considerations) linked to guerrilla warfare. And during this era, there was a "policy" or view the reaffirmation of an identity and a history without which no speech "left" is possible. Thus, there was no chance of "revivalism".

== Track listing ==
Side A

1. "Stalingrado" – 5:25
2. "La fabbrica" – 3:53
3. "Arrivano gli americani" – 5:55
4. "8 settembre" – 4:52

Side B

1. "Nuvole a Vinca" – 4:25
2. "Dante di Nanni" – 4:18
3. "Gianfranco Mattei" – 4:22
4. "La sepoltura dei morti" – 3:53
5. "Un biglietto del tram" – 5:42

== Personnel ==
- Franco Fabbri – guitar, vocals
- Umberto Fiori – guitar, vocals
- Carlo De Martini – saxophone, violin
- Tommaso Leddi – violin, mandolin, balalajka, guitar
- Luca Piscicelli – bass guitar, vocals
- Antonio Zanuso – drums
