= Romantic Warriors II: Special Features DVD =

2013 documentary film

- DVD cover
- Directed by: Adele Schmidt; José Zegarra Holder
- Produced by: Adele Schmidt; José Zegarra Holder
- Starring: Chris Cutler; Christian Vander; Giorgio Gomelsky; Roger Trigaux; Franco Fabbri; Ferdinand Richard; Gérard Hourbette; Marc Hollander; Lars Krantz; Mike Johnson; Joris Vanvinckenroye; Francesco Zago; Carla Kihlstedt; Matthias Bossi; Dave Kerman; Bob Drake
- Cinematography: Adele Schmidt; José Zegarra Holder
- Edited by: Adele Schmidt; Scott Bastedo; Tom Fish
- Music by: Aranis; Yugen; Thinking Plague; Hamster Theatre; Miriodor; Ruins Alone; Stormy Six; Rabbit Rabbit
- Distributed by: Zeitgeist Media
- Release date: January 2013
- Running time: 100 min.
- Country: United States
- Languages: English; French (English subtitles)

Got RIO? Romantic Warriors II: Special Features DVD is a 2013 documentary film and an addendum to the 2012 feature-length documentary Romantic Warriors II: A Progressive Music Saga About Rock in Opposition. The film was written and directed by Adele Schmidt and José Zegarra Holder, and was released in the United States by Zeitgeist Media. It was generally well received by critics, with a reviewer at AllMusic saying that it "is a showcase for tremendous musicianship and a must-have for existing [Rock in Opposition] fans".

The Special Features DVD consists of additional material filmed during the making of, but not used in, the original Romantic Warriors II. Unlike its predecessor, the DVD is not narrated, and features 60 minutes of live performance videos by eight of the bands that appear in the original film, followed by 40 minutes of additional interview clips of people interviewed in the first Romantic Warriors II.

== Reception ==
Professional ratings
Review scores
Source	Rating
AllMusic	4.5/5 stars
Babyblaue Seiten	recommended

Dave Lynch at AllMusic welcomed the one hour's worth of live performance videos on the Special Features DVD, which he said made up for the "short performance snippets" in the original documentary. He was impressed by the music, particularly Yugen's "Becchime", which he called "astounding". Lynch said that the DVD "is a showcase for tremendous musicianship and a must-have for existing [Rock in Opposition] fans", but added that for context "the uninitiated should probably experience the original Romantic Warriors II first".

Achim Breiling wrote in a review at Babyblaue Seiten that the performances on the Special Features DVD shows how Rock in Opposition as a style of music has diversified since the movement was formed in the late 1970s. He said that the DVD is a great and very informative ("großartige und sehr aufschlussreiche") addition to the Romantic Warriors series.

== Video performances ==
1. "Noise" by Aranis (Joris Vanvinckenroye) – 12:00
  - Performed at Madam Fortuna, Antwerp, Belgium in 2011
    - Joris Vanvinckenroye – contrabass
    - Liesbeth Lambrecht – violin
    - Marjolein Cools – accordion
    - Stijn Denys – guitar
    - Jana Arns – transverse flute
    - Dave Kerman – drums, percussion
    - Pierre Chevalier – piano
    - Live sound recording – Pieter Thys
    - Sound mix – Pieter Thys, Joris Vanvinckenroye
2. "Becchime" by Yugen (Francesco Zago) – 12:30
  - Performed at RIO Festival, Carmaux, France in 2011
    - Francesco Zago – guitar
    - Paolo Botta – keyboards
    - Maurizio Fasoli – piano
    - Valerio Cipollone – soprano saxophones, clarinets
    - Michele Salgarello – drums
    - Matteo Lorito – bass guitar
    - Jacopo Costa – marimba, vibraphone
    - Live sound recording – Mike Potter
    - Sound mix – Andrea Rizzardo
3. "Dead Silence" by Thinking Plague (Mike Johnson) – 4:50
  - Performed at Alexander Dawson Arts School, Colorado, US in 2011
    - Mike Johnson – guitars
    - Elaine DiFalco – vocals
    - Dave Willey – bass guitar
    - Mark Harris – saxophones, clarinets
    - Robin Chestnut – drums
    - Live sound recording – Jon Stubbs
    - Sound mix – Jon Stubbs, Mike Johnson
4. "Bug 2: A History of the United States" by Hamster Theatre (Dave Willey/Jon Stubbs) – 4:00
  - Performed at Alexander Dawson Arts School, Colorado, US in 2011
    - Dave Willey – accordion
    - Jon Stubs – keyboards
    - Mike Johnson – guitar
    - Mark Harris – winds, reeds
    - Raoul Rossiter – drums
    - Brian McDougall – bass guitar
    - Live sound recording – Jon Stubbs
    - Sound mix – Jon Stubbs, Dave Willey
5. "Ruins' Medley" by Ruins Alone (Tatsuya Yoshida) – 7:10
  - Performed at RIO Festival, Carmaux, France in 2011
    - Tatsuya Yoshida – drums
    - Live sound recording – Mike Potter
    - Sound mix – Mike Potter
6. "La Roche/Meeting Point" by Miriodor (Bernard Falaise/Pascal Globensky/Rémi Leclerc/Nicolas Masino) – 9:50
  - Performed at Sonic Circuits Festival, Washington, D.C., US in 2010
    - Pascal Globensky – keyboards
    - Pierre Labbé – saxophone, winds
    - Bernard Falaise – guitar
    - Rémi Leclerc – drums
    - Nicolas Masino – bass guitar, keyboards
    - Live sound recording – Mike Potter
    - Sound mix – Mike Potter
7. "Gianfranco Mattei" by Stormy Six (Paolo Fabbri/Franco Fabbri) – 5:30
  - Performed at Sesto San Giovanni, Milan, Italy in 2008
    - Carlo De Martini – violin
    - Tommaso Leddi – mandolin
    - Antonio Zanuso – drums
    - Pino Martini – bass guitar
    - Umberto Fioro – acoustic guitar, vocals
    - Franco Fabbri – electric guitar, vocals
    - Salvatore Garau – drums
    - Giorgio Casani – acoustic guitar, vocals
    - Massimo Villa – bass guitar
    - Sound engineer – Giorgio Albani
8. "Tiny Invasion" by Rabbit Rabbit (Carla Kihlstedt) – 4:31
  - Performed at Orion Sound Studios, Maryland, US in 2011
    - Carla Kihlstedt – violin, voice
    - Matthias Bossi – drums, percussion

== Romantic Warriors series ==
- Romantic Warriors: A Progressive Music Saga (2010)
- Romantic Warriors II: A Progressive Music Saga About Rock in Opposition (2012)
- Romantic Warriors III: Canterbury Tales (2015)
- Romantic Warriors IV: Krautrock (2019, three parts)
