= The Rogue Independent Music Festival =

Atlanta music festival

The Rogue Independent Music Festival, also known as Rogue Fest, was a two-day festival of progressive rock and art rock held annually in Atlanta, GA from 2002 to 2006.

The festival was conceived after the promoters spent much time traveling to other progressive rock and art rock festivals throughout the United States year after year to listen to the music they enjoyed. In 2002, the promoters of Rogue Fest decided to hold a festival in their home town of Atlanta, and so The Rogue Independent Music Festival was born. For the first three years, The Rogue Independent Music Festival was held at The New American Shakespeare Tavern in Atlanta, GA. In 2005, the fourth year of the festival, that location was not available because the date was moved from July to June and Rogue Fest was moved to Jake's Toadhouse. Cobweb Strange is the only band that performed at every Rogue Fest. A live version of their song, "Clarity's Advent," that was recorded at the 2003 Rogue Fest was included on the compilation CD Ghost Notes.

== Festivals and performers ==
Rogue Fest 5 (July 7 & 8, 2006)
Location: Eyedrum in Atlanta, GA

Big Hairy Monster, Capillary Action, Cobweb Strange, Farpoint, Christopher Hunt, Kindness of Strangers, The Lost Boys, Outpost 9, Spaceseed, TouchXTone, Unbounded Sky, Z-Axis

Rogue Fest 4 (June 18 & 19, 2005)
Location: Jake's Toadhouse

Brass Knuckle Surfer, Cobweb Strange, DP3, Farpoint, IZZ, Land of Chocolate, The Lost Boys, Man on Fire, Noise Dot Com, The Red Masque, Unbounded Sky, Z-Axis

Rogue Fest 3 (July 17 & 18, 2004)

Location: The New American Shakespeare Tavern in Atlanta, GA

Belljar, Cobweb Strange, Electric Poem, Farpoint, Hazard Factor, Karma Lingo, Lord Only, Man on Fire, Timothy Pure, Unbounded Sky, Wheatstone Bridge, Z-Axis

Rogue Fest 2 (July 12 & 13, 2003)

Location: The New American Shakespeare Tavern in Atlanta, GA

Cobweb Strange, The Datura Blues, Dead Musicians' Society, Farpoint, Karma Lingo, Lord Only, Man on Fire, Paine's Promise, Solution Science Systems, UT, XL, Z-Axis

Rogue Fest 1 (July 27, 2002)
Location: The New American Shakespeare Tavern in Atlanta, GA

Cobweb Strange, Karma Lingo, KTM, Natural Tension, Paine's Promise, Paracelsus, Trilobite Cafe
