= Ceux du dehors =

Studio album by Univers Zero
- Released: 1981
- Recorded: Various dates between 1980–1981, including March and April 1980
- Studio: Sunrise Studios (tracks 1, 2, 4 and 5), Studio D'Hennuyères tracks 3 and 6), Saint-Jacques Church (Brussels; organ on track 2)
- Genre: Rock in Opposition; avant-rock
- Length: 44:36 (LP); 50:12 (CD)
- Label: Recommended
- Producer: Eric Faes, Univers Zero

Univers Zero chronology
Heresie (1979)	Ceux du dehors (1981)	Crawling Wind (1983)

Ceux du dehors (1981) is the third album by the Belgian RIO band Univers Zero. The title translates as "The Outsiders", which strongly alludes, among other things, to the Dark Fantasy works of HP Lovecraft.

The original LP consisted of six tracks. The CD pressing adds a seventh track, "Triomphe des mouches", previously released as a one-sided single.

Ceux du dehors was the first Univers Zero album without guitarist and founding member Roger Trigaux, who had left to form his own group, Present.

"La musique d'Erich Zann" is a collective group improvisation. The title alludes to the short story of the same name by H. P. Lovecraft; the players read the story in studio, then proceeded to record the piece.

== Track listing ==
1. "Dense" (Daniel Denis) – 12:26
2. "La corne du bois des pendus" (Denis) – 8:42
3. "Bonjour chez vous" (Denis) – 3:52
4. "Combat" (Andy Kirk) – 12:53
5. "La musique d'Erich Zann" (Denis, Kirk, Guy Segers, Michel Berckmans, Jean Debefve, Patrick Hanappier) – 3:29
6. "La tête du corbeau" (Segers) – 3:11
7. "Triomphe des mouches" (Denis, Kirk) – 5:36 (only on CD)

== Personnel ==
=== Univers Zero ===
- Guy Segers – bass guitar, vocals, clarinet
- Andy Kirk – harmonium, organ, piano, Mellotron, vocals
- Michel Berckmans – English horn, bassoon, oboe
- Daniel Denis – drums, percussion, harmonium, vocals
- Patrick Hanappier, Jean-Luc Aimé – violin, viola

=== Additional Personnel ===
- Jean Debefre – hurdy-gurdy
- Thierry Zaboïtzeff – cello
- Ilona Chale – vocals
