= Clivages =

Studio album by Univers Zero
- Released: 2010
- Recorded: 2009
- Genre: Rock in Opposition
- Length: 66:22
- Label: Cuneiform

Univers Zero chronology
Implosion (2004)	Clivages (2010)

Professional ratings
Review scores
Source	Rating
Allmusic	4.5/5 stars

Clivages is the ninth studio album by Belgian RIO band Univers Zero. Only four of the ten tracks were composed by Daniel Denis, who composed a majority of the material on most previous releases . The opening track, Les Kobolds, incorporates Flemish folk music for the first time in a Univers Zero piece.

== Track listing ==
No.	Title	Writer(s)	Length
1.	""Les Kobolds" (Daniel Denis)"	Daniel Denis	4:15
2.	""Warrior" (Andy Kirk)"	Andy Kirk	12:10
3.	""Vacillements" (Michel Berckmans)"	Michel Berckmans	3:35
4.	""Earth Scream" (Daniel Denis)"	Daniel Denis	3:11
5.	""Soubresauts" (Daniel Denis)"	Daniel Denis	7:59
6.	""Apesanteur" (Michel Berckmans)"	Michel Berckmans	3:40
7.	""Three Days" (Kurt Budé)"	Kurt Budé	5:53
8.	""Straight Edge" (Kurt Budé)"	Kurt Budé	13:57
9.	""Retour de Force" (Michel Berckmans)"	Michel Berckmans	7:42
10.	""Les Cercles d'Horus" (Daniel Denis)"	Daniel Denis	3:45
Total length:			66:22

== Personnel ==
- Michel Berckmans: bassoon, English horn, oboe, melodica
- Kurt Budé: clarinet, bass clarinet, alto saxophone
- Pierre Chevalier: keyboards, glockenspiel
- Daniel Denis: drums, percussion, sampler
- Dimitri Evers: electric bass, fretless bass
- Andy Kirk: guitar (tracks 2 and 5); percussion (track 2)
- Martin Lauwers: violin

Also with:

- Nicolas Denis: drums (track 10)
- Philippe Thuriot: accordion (tracks 1 and 10)
- Aurelia Boven: cello (track 10)
