= Miriodor =

Canadian musical group

- Origin: Quebec City, Quebec, Canada
- Genres: Rock in Opposition, jazz, progressive rock
- Years active: 1980–present
- Label: Cuneiform Records
- Members: Pascal Globensky; Rémi Leclerc; Bernard Falaise; Nicolas Lessard
- Past members: François Émond; Sabin Hudon; Marc Petitclerc; Denis Robitaille; Nicolas Masino
- Website: miriodor.com

Miriodor is a Canadian musical group of the Rock in Opposition movement; the band combines jazz, progressive rock and chamber music into a powerful sound reminiscent of artists like Univers Zéro or Art Zoyd.

== History ==
Miriodor was founded by François Émond and Pascal Globensky in 1980. By 1983 the band consisted of Émond (violin, flute, keyboards, clarinet), Globensky (keyboards, acoustic guitar), Rémi Leclerc (percussion), Sabin Hudon (saxophone), Denis Robitaille (guitar, bass, vocals), and Marc Petitclerc (keyboards). In 1986, this line-up independently released the album Rencontres.

In 1984, Émond, Globensky, Leclerc and Hudon moved to Montreal, and began recording. One song, "Middle Ages", appeared in the audio magazine RēR Quarterly. In 1987, they independently released two albums: Tot Ou Tard and Metam Orpho Sis.

Émond left the band in 1987. In 1988, the band was signed by Cuneiform Records and recorded the album Miriodor, which included many of their previously published songs. The album was released worldwide; they played the 1988 Festival International de Musique Actuelle de Victoriaville and, with the help of the l'Agence Québec/Wallonie-Bruxelles pour la jeunesse (the agency for international co-operation between Belgium and Quebec), toured in Belgium and France in March 1989. In 1991, Cuneiform released Miriodor's 3rd Warning. The band played the Festival des musiques de création du Saguenay-Lac-St-Jean and the International Computer Music Conference. Bernard Falaise (electric guitar and bass) joined the band in 1993. The quartet recorded the song "Promenade sous zéro", which appeared on the compilation album Unsettled Scores.

In 1996, Miriodor released the album Elastic Juggling. Sabin Hudon left the band mid-process; he was replaced by Nicolas Masino (bass, keyboards), and they performed at ProgScape '96 in Baltimore, the Montreal International Jazz Festival, and at La Maison du Québec in St-Malo (France). In 1998, Marie-Chantal Leclair (saxophones) joined the band. In 1999, Miriodor recorded the score for the documentary film Almanach, produced by the National Film Board of Canada.

In October 2000, Miriodor played at Chicago's HotHouse, and at Edgefest, an Avant-garde festival in Ann Arbor, Michigan. Their album Mekano, was released in September 2001, now with the addition of violinist Marie-Soleil Bélanger. Miriodor performed at the progressive rock festival NEARfest in Trenton, New Jersey, in 2002 and 2003.

By 2011, Miriodor was back to a trio, of Falaise, Globensky and Leclerc, and they recorded their 2013 album, Cobra Fakir. Nicolas Lessard (bass guitar/keyboards) joined Miriodor, and the band premiered the material live on August 31 at ProgDay 2013 in Chapel Hill, North Carolina. In 2014, they played Seattle's Seaprog festival.

In 2017, the band released the album Signal 9. The album is dedicated to Miriodor co-founder François Émond, who died that year.

In 2022, the band released the album Elements. As of 2024, they were seen as the opening act for the David Cross Band in the province of Québec.

== Discography ==
- Rencontres – 1986, Independent. Re-Issued 1998, Cuneiform Records
- Tôt Ou Tard – 1987, Independent
- Metam Orpho Sis – 1987, Independent
- Miriodor - 1988, Cuneiform Records, Re-Issued 1993
- 3è Avertissement / 3rd Warning – 1991, Cuneiform Records
- Jongleries Élastiques – 1996, Cuneiform Records
- Mekano - 2001, Cuneiform Records
- Parade + Live at NEARfest 2002 – 2005, Cuneiform Records
- Avanti! - 2009, Cuneiform Records
- LIVE 89 - 2009, ProgQuébec (recorded 1989)
- Cobra Fakir - 2013, Cuneiform Records
- Signal 9 - 2017, Cuneiform Records
- Elements - 2022, Cuneiform Records

== Soundtracks ==
- Almanach, 1999, National Film Board of Canada

== Members ==
The current lineup, as of 2013 (and 2017), is composed of:

- Pascal Globensky – keyboards (since album 1)
- Rémi Leclerc – drums (since album 1)
- Bernard Falaise – Guitar (since album 4)
- Nicolas Lessard – bass (since album 9)

Former members :

- Sabin Hudon — sax (albums 1–2–3–4)
- François Émond — flute/violin/keyboards (albums 1–2) (1964–2016)
- Marc Petitclerc — keyboard (album 1)
- Denis Robitaille — bass (album 1)
- Nicolas Masino — bass/keyboards (albums 5–6–7)

Other credited musicians:

- Claude St-Jean — trombone (album 4)
- Stéphanie Simard — violin (album 4)
- James Darling — cello (album 4)
- Jean-Denis Levasseur — flute (album 4)
- Ivanhoe Jolicoeur — trumpet (album 4)
- Stefka Iordanova — voice (album 4)
- Marie-Chantal Leclair — sax (albums 5–6–7)
- Marie-Soleil Bélanger — violin (albums 5–6)
- Némo Venba — trumpet (album 5)
- Lars Hollmer — (album 6)
- Lise Millet — (album 6)
- Pierre Labbé — sax (album 7)
- Maxime St-Pierre — trumpet (album 7)

== See also ==
- Romantic Warriors II: A Progressive Music Saga About Rock in Opposition
- Romantic Warriors II: Special Features DVD
