= Crawling Wind =

EP by Univers Zero
- Released: 1983
- Genre: Rock in Opposition
- Length: 19:34
- Label: Cuneiform

Univers Zero chronology
Ceux du Dehors (1981)	Crawling Wind (1983)	Uzed (1984)

Professional ratings
Review scores
Source	Rating
allmusic	4/5 stars

Crawling Wind is an EP by Univers Zero. It was a 3-song EP when originally released in 1983, but a 2001 reissue of the album included an extra studio track, "Influences" - originally issued on "The Recommended Records Sampler" 2-LP set - as well as two previously unreleased live tracks.

The track "Central Belgium in the Dark" is a live improvisation from March 27th 1982. The bonus track on the Japanese edition is "Up or Down" 4:48, live from the same March 27th show, and is inserted as track #4, raising the number of tracks on the CD to seven total.

== Track listing ==
1. "Toujours Plus à l'Est" (Denis) – 5:34
2. "Before the Heat" (Kirk) – 4:06
3. "Central Belgium in the Dark" (Denis, Descheemaeker, Kirk, Segers & Ward) – 9:54
4. "Influences" (Kirk) – 7:36
5. "Triomphe des Mouches [Live]" (Denis) – 9:55
6. "Complainte [Live]" (Denis) – 5:29

== Personnel ==
Tracks 1–4:

• Daniel Denis: drums, percussion, voice, harmonium, violin, piano
• Dirk Descheemaeker: clarinet, bass clarinet
• Andy Kirk: harmonium, organ, voice, piano, synth, viola, music box, percussion, radio
• Guy Segers: bass, voice, violin, "invisible talk", "flies talk"
• Alan Ward: violin

Track 5:

• Daniel Denis: drums
• Dirk Descheemaeker: clarinet, casto
• Christian Genet: bass
• André Mergenthaler: cello
• Jean-Luc Plouvier: keyboards

Track 6:

• Michel Berckmans: oboe, bassoon
• Daniel Denis: harmonium
• Patrick Hanappier: viola
• Guy Segers: percussion
• Roger Trigaux: guitar
