= Farpoint =

Farpoint may refer to:

- Farpoint Observatory in Wabaunsee County, Kansas, United States
- Farpoint (band), American Progressive Rock band
- "Encounter at Farpoint", first episode of television series Star Trek: The Next Generation
- Far point, a measure of an individual's ability to see distant objects as clear and in focus
- Farpoint (video game), a 2017 video game
