= Aranis =

Flemish avant-rock group

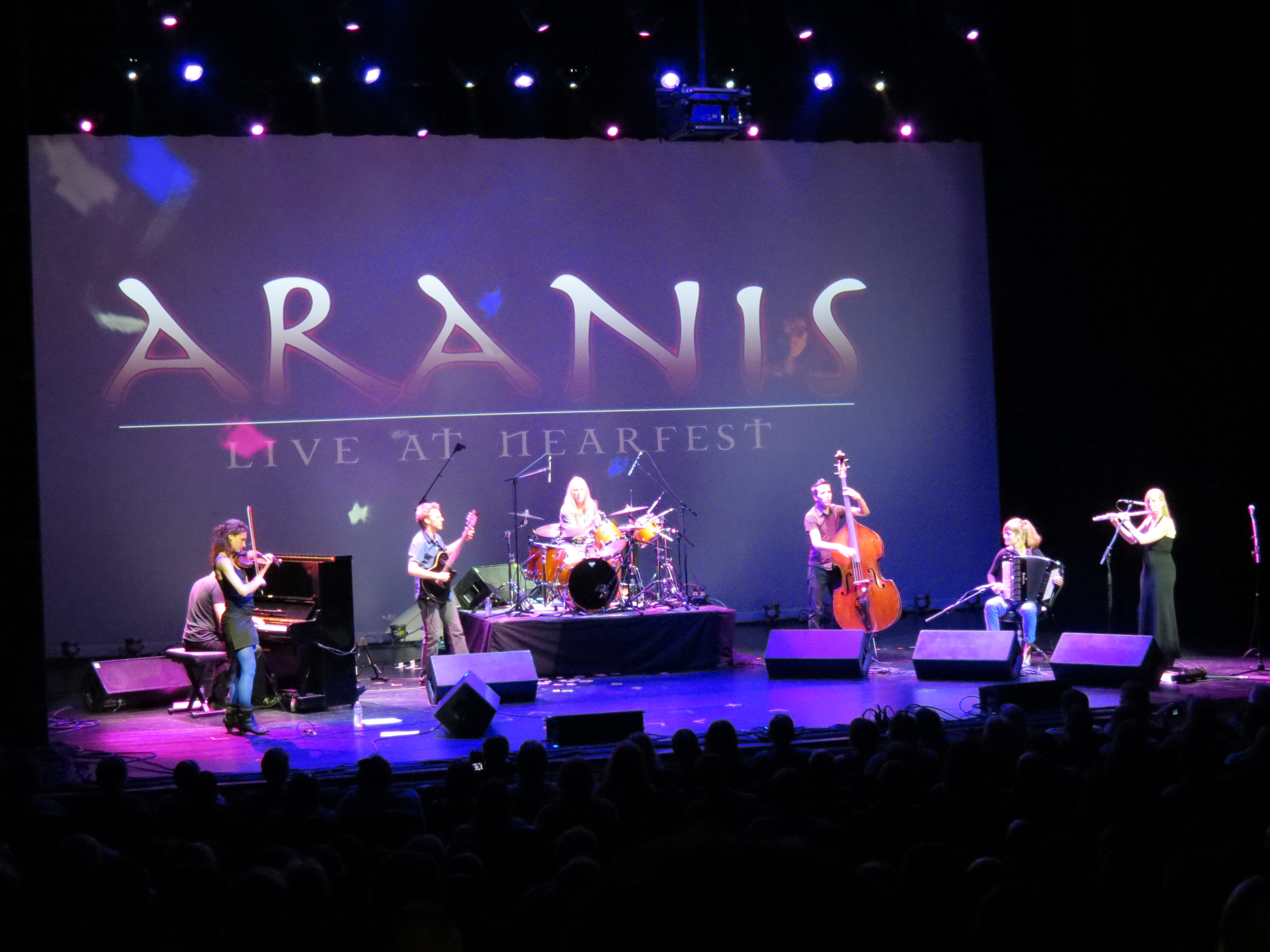
- Aranis performing at NEARfest in June 2012

Background information
- Origin: Belgium
- Genres: Avant-rock, experimental, neo-classical chamber, minimalism
- Years active: 2002–present
- Label: Home Records
- Members: Joris Vanvinckenroye; Liesbeth Lambrecht; Marjolein Cools; Stijn Denys; Jana Arns
- Past members: Linde de Groof; Axelle Kennes; Ward De Vleeschhouwer
- Website: www.aranis.be

Aranis are a Flemish acoustic avant-rock, experimental and neo-classical chamber music group led by composer and contrabass player Joris Vanvinckenroye. Their music has been described as a blend of "chamber classical and rock", "Chamber Music Rock", and "Belgian chamber rock" with elements of East and Southern European folk music. Aranis have recorded six albums, and have performed live at a number of European venues, including the Rock in Opposition festivals in Carmaux, France. They made their American concert debut at NEARfest Apocalypse at Zoellner Arts Center, Bethlehem, Pennsylvania in June 2012.

A biography of the group at All About Jazz said that "[i]n concert, Aranis creates an unforgettable atmosphere. Variation and expressivity hold the audience riveted. Chaotic structures and virtuoso crescendos alternate with serene intervals."

== Biography ==
Aranis are based in Antwerp, Belgium, and their music, composed by Vanvinckenroye, features contrabass, violin, accordion, flute, piano and guitar. Their first live performance was in Heist-op-den-Berg in 2002, and their debut album, Aranis was released in 2005. Aranis' third album, Songs From Mirage was released in 2009 and their sound was augmented by the inclusion of three female vocalists. Also in 2009, Vanvinckenroye created a solo bass project called BASta! and recorded Cycles, an album featuring him on solo multi-tracked double bass. Aranis released RoqueForte in 2010 and included drummer Dave Kerman of the 5uu's and Thinking Plague, departing from their hitherto "signature drummerless acoustic sound".

In 2011 Aranis joined forces with Belgian groups Univers Zero and Present to form a 17-member ensemble called Once Upon a Time in Belgium. They premiered at the fourth edition of the Rock in Opposition festival held in Carmaux, France in September 2011, where they performed "New York Transformations", a work composed by Kurt Budé of Univers Zero. Once Upon a Time in Belgium appears in the documentary film Romantic Warriors II: A Progressive Music Saga About Rock in Opposition (2012); Aranis also features in this film, and the companion Romantic Warriors II: Special Features DVD (2013).

In 2012, as a sextet and without a drummer again, Aranis departed from recording compositions by Vanvinckenroye and released Made in Belgium, an album of interpretations of works by other Belgian composers, including Wim Mertens, Daniel Denis of Univers Zero, and Roger Trigaux of Present. In 2014 Aranis released Made in Belgium II, another album of interpretations of works by Belgian composers, including Peter Vermeersch and Walter Hus.

== Discography ==
Studio albums

- Aranis (2005)
- Aranis II (2007)
- Songs from Mirage (2009)
- RoqueForte (2010)
- Made in Belgium (2012)
- Made in Belgium II (2014)
- Smells like Aranis (2017)

Compilation albums

- Vinylplaat (2008) – contains selections from Aranis and Aranis II

Singles

- "Hidden Soundscapes" (2007) – collaboration with flutist Toon Fret

Source: Aranis homepage

== Film appearances ==
- Romantic Warriors II: A Progressive Music Saga About Rock in Opposition
- Romantic Warriors II: Special Features DVD

== Members ==
- Joris Vanvinckenroye – composer, contrabass
- Linde de Groof – violin
- Liesbeth Lambrecht – violin
- Marjolein Cools – accordion
- Axelle Kennes – piano
- Ward De Vleeschhouwer – piano
- Stijn Denys – guitar
- Jana Arns – flute

Source: Aranis homepage

=== Guest musicians ===
On Songs From Mirage

- Els van Laethem – voice
- Anne Marie Honggokoessoemo – voice
- Herlinde Ghekiere – voice
- Linde de Groof – violin
- Els Vrints – piano

On RoqueForte

- Dave Kerman – percussion
- Stefan Wellens – viola
- Pierre Chevalier – piano

Source: Aranis homepage
