= Joris Vanvinckenroye =

Flemish double bass musician and composer (born 1977)

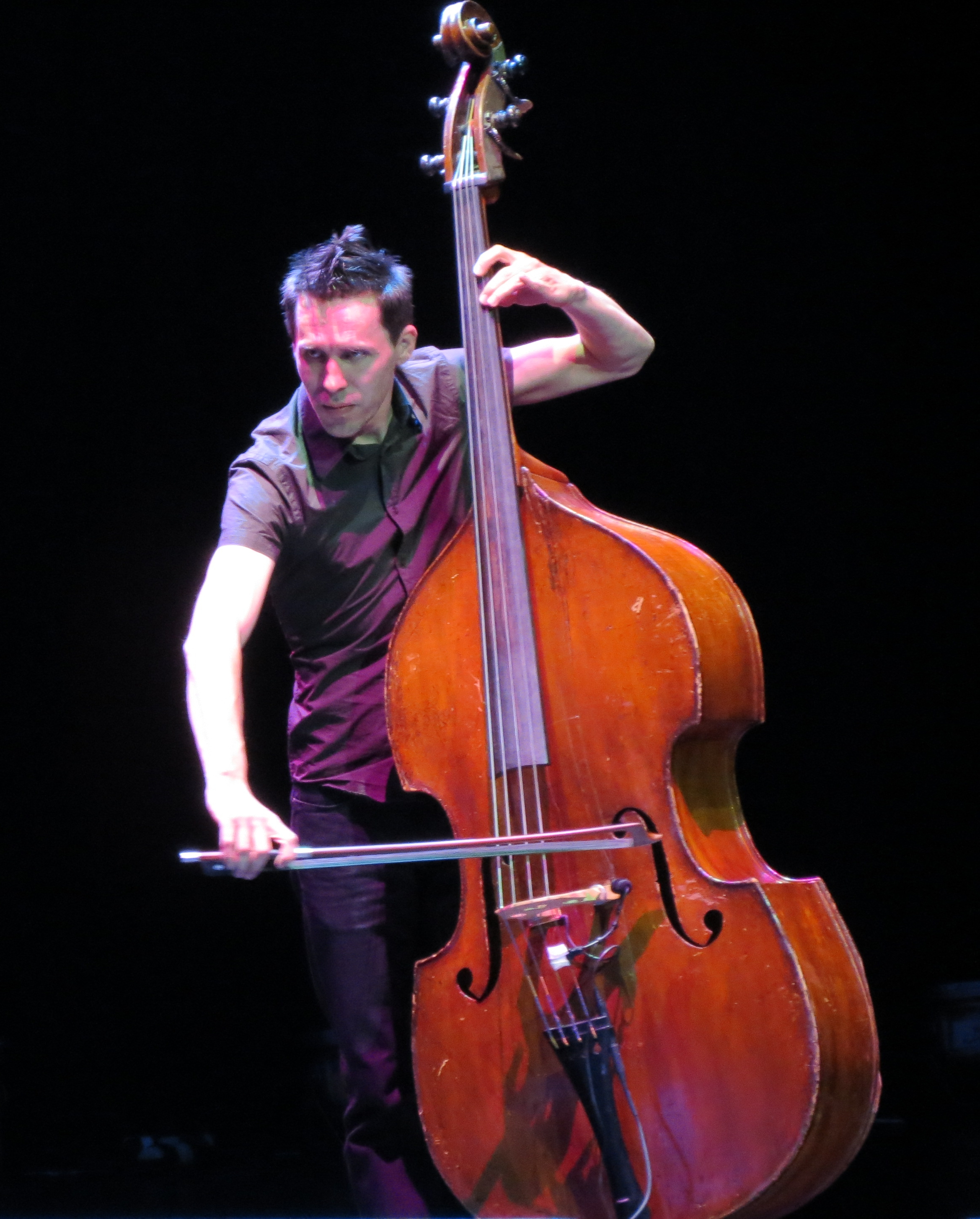
- Joris Vanvinckenroye performing with Aranis at NEARfest in June 2012

Background information
- Also known as: BASta!
- Born: 1977 (age 48–49); Lier, Belgium
- Genres: Avant-rock, experimental, neo-classical, minimalism
- Occupations: Musician, composer
- Instrument: Double bass
- Years active: 1994–present
- Label: Home Records
- Website: bastasolobass.weebly.com

Joris Vanvinckenroye (born 1977), also known by his solo moniker BASta!, is a Flemish avant-rock and experimental double bass musician and composer. He is best known for Aranis, a neo-classical chamber rock group he founded and leads, and for his double bass solo project, BASta!.

Vanvinckenroye has performed in Europe and the United States, and recorded seven albums with Aranis. As BASta!, he released a solo album, Cycles, which a review at AllMusic described as "a fabulous showcase for the talents of Joris Vanvinckenroye".

== Biography ==
Joris Vanvinckenroye began studying contrabass when he was 16 at the Music Academy of Lier in Belgium. He won Belgium's Axion Classics award in 2000, and continued his studies at the Royal Flemish Conservatoire in Antwerp, where he obtained a master's degree in double bass in 2005. Vanvinckenroye also obtained a secondary school teacher diploma in 2000 in physics, geography and mathematics.

In 1994, while still studying, Vanvinckenroye co-founded Troissoeur, an electronic group, who toured Europe into the early 2000s, and released two CDs. In 2002 Vanvinckenroye founded and led Aranis, an acoustic avant-rock, experimental and neo-classical chamber music group. Between 2005 and 2017, Aranis recorded seven albums and performed in Europe, Japan and the United States.

In 2009 Vanvinckenroye created a solo project called BASta! and recorded Cycles, an album featuring him on solo multi-tracked double bass. BASta! concerts feature Vanvinckenroye solo playing double bass with a loop sampler, creating a multi-layered sound. Vanvinckenroye said that Troissoeur's guitarist used a loop station, and after trying loops himself to create a composition for his final double bass exam at the conservatory, he incorporated it into his concerts.

In addition to his group and solo activities, Vanvinckenroye also composes music for dance and theatre. Between 2003 and 2006 he supplied music for Lunfardo, a tango dance group. He has also collaborated with the Retina Dance Company, composing music and performing it live in two of their productions: as BASta! in Antipode in 2009, and with Aranis in Layers of Skin in 2012. Vanvinckenroye has worked with several musicians, including Sandy Dillon, playing double bass on her 2006 album, Pull the Strings. He also periodically teaches musical improvisation and creativity.

== Discography ==
With Troissoeur

- Trah Njim (2000)
- 3S (2004)

With Aranis

- Aranis (2005)
- Aranis II (2007)
- Songs From Mirage (2009)
- RoqueForte (2010)
- Made in Belgium (2012)
- Made in Belgium II (2014)
- Smells Like Aranis (2017)

Solo

- Cycles (2009) – released under the moniker BASta!
- III (2024) – released under the moniker BASta!

== Film appearances ==
- Romantic Warriors II: A Progressive Music Saga About Rock in Opposition
- Romantic Warriors II: Special Features DVD
