= Stormy Six =

Italian band

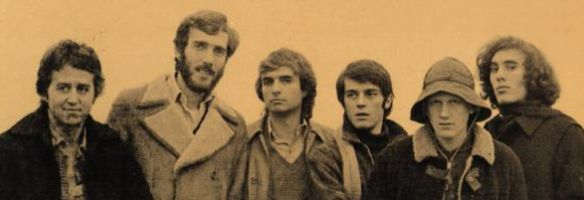

Background information
- Origin: Milan, Italy
- Genres: Progressive rock, folk rock, Rock in Opposition, avant-rock, beat
- Years active: 1966–1983; 1993–2010
- Labels: First, L'Orchestra
- Past members: Giovanni Fabbri; Maurizio Masla; Franco Fabbri; Luca Piscicelli; Fausto Martinetti; Alberto Santagostino; Antonio Zanuso; Claudio Rocchi; Massimo Villa; Umberto Fiori; Carlo De Martini; Tommaso Leddi; Salvatore Garau; Renato Rivolta; Pino Martini; Leonardo Schiavone; Stefano Barbaglia
- Website: www.francofabbri.net

Stormy Six were an Italian progressive and folk rock band founded in Milan in 1966. They performed and recorded until 1983, mostly as a sextet but occasionally as a quartet, a quintet and a septet. Although their line-up changed considerably over the years, founding member Franco Fabbri remained with the group for its entire duration. In May 1993 they performed at a re-union concert in Milan, which was recorded and released on a CD, Un Concerto (1995).

Stormy Six were best known as one of the five original Rock in Opposition (RIO) bands that performed at the first RIO festival in March 1978 in London. They later participated actively in the shaping of RIO as an organisation and performed across Europe with other RIO and related bands.

== History ==
Stormy Six began in 1966 as a pop/psychedelic rock band, opening for The Rolling Stones on their first Italian tour in 1967. After some line-up changes Stormy Six switched to left-wing/protest folk rock and their first three albums, recorded in the late 1960s and early 1970s, reflect this style. In the mid-1970s their music became more complex and they started to experiment, moving into progressive rock.

At the end of 1974 Stormy Six and other musicians in Milan formed a music cooperative called L'Orchestra which was aimed at "promoting all sorts of non-commercial music, and included avantgarde, jazz, political, protest and popular music". It also became an independent record label which the musicians managed themselves and on which Stormy Six released many of their own singles and albums. Stormy Six played a leading role in the affairs of L'Orchestra.

Stormy Six's exposure to and collaboration with foreign artists began in 1975 when English avant-rock group Henry Cow first toured Italy. Stormy Six invited Henry Cow to join L'Orchestra which cemented a relationship between the two bands. Later, in 1978, Henry Cow invited Stormy Six and three other European groups to perform at a Rock in Opposition (RIO) festival in London. As one of the five original RIO members, Stormy Six participated actively in the shaping of RIO as an organisation. In 1979 Stormy Six organised a second RIO festival in Milan where the now seven RIO members performed in a week-long event.

Stormy Six's sixth album, L'Apprendista (1977) was well received in progressive rock circles, and their next album, Macchina Maccheronica (1980) won them a place in the "RIO genre". Henry Cow's Georgie Born guested on Macchina Maccheronica and performed with Stormy Six in several of their concerts at the time.

After recording one more album, Al Volo (1982), Stormy Six broke up in 1983.

In July 1983 three of the former Stormy Six members (Franco Fabbri, Umberto Fiori and Pino Martini) collaborated with German avant-rock group Cassiber (Chris Cutler from Henry Cow, Heiner Goebbels and Alfred Harth) for a public workshop and recording project at the Cantiere Internazionale d'Arte of Montepulciano. The recordings were subsequently broadcast by RAI Radio3, Italian Radio, and seven of the pieces later appeared under the name Cassix (Cassiber/Stormy Six) on the Recommended Records sound-magazine, Rē Records Quarterly Vol.1 No.3 (1986).

On 10 May 1993 a Stormy Six reunion took place for a performance at the Orfeo Theatre in Milan. The concert was recorded and later released on a live album, Un Concerto (1995).

== Members ==
Stormy Six's line-up changed considerably over the years, with founding member Franco Fabbri being the only constant member.

| 1966–1967 | Giovanni Fabbri – rhythm guitar; Maurizio Masla – vocals; Franco Fabbri – guitar, vocals; Luca Piscicelli – guitar, vocals; Fausto Martinetti – keyboards; Alberto Santagostino – bass guitar; Antonio Zanuso – drums |
| 1967–1968 | Maurizio Masla – vocals; Franco Fabbri – guitar, vocals; Luca Piscicelli – guitar, vocals; Fausto Martinetti – keyboards; Alberto Santagostino – bass guitar; Antonio Zanuso – drums |
| 1968–1969 | Franco Fabbri – guitar, vocals; Claudio Rocchi – bass guitar, vocals; Luca Piscicelli – guitar, bass guitar, vocals; Antonio Zanuso – drums |
| 1970–1972 | Franco Fabbri – guitar, vocals; Luca Piscicelli – guitar, bass guitar, vocals; Antonio Zanuso – drums; Massimo Villa – bass guitar |
| 1973–1975 | Franco Fabbri – guitar, vocals; Umberto Fiori – guitar, vocals; Carlo De Martini – saxophone, violin; Tommaso Leddi – violin, mandolin, balalajka, guitar; Luca Piscicelli – bass guitar, vocals; Antonio Zanuso – drums |
| 1976 | Franco Fabbri – guitar, vocals; Umberto Fiori – guitar, vocals; Carlo De Martini – saxophone, violin; Tommaso Leddi – violin, mandolin, balalajka, guitar; Luca Piscicelli – bass guitar, vocals; Salvatore Garau – drums |
| 1978 | Umberto Fiori – vocals; Franco Fabbri – guitar, vibraphone, trombone, vocals; Carlo De Martini – violin; Tommaso Leddi – violin, mandolin, guitar, alto saxophone; Renato Rivolta – soprano saxophone; Pino Martini – bass guitar; Salvatore Garau – drums |
| 1979–1980 | Umberto Fiori – vocals; Franco Fabbri – guitar, vibraphone, trombone, vocals; Tommaso Leddi – violin, mandolin, guitar, alto saxophone; Pino Martini – bass guitar; Salvatore Garau – drums; Leonardo Schiavone – clarinet |
| 1981 | Umberto Fiori – vocals; Franco Fabbri – guitar, vibraphone, trombone, vocals; Tommaso Leddi – violin, mandolin, guitar, alto saxophone; Pino Martini – bass guitar; Salvatore Garau – drums; Stefano Barbaglia – clarinet |
| 1982 | Umberto Fiori – vocals; Franco Fabbri – guitar, synth guitar, vocals; Tommaso Leddi – keyboards, guitar; Pino Martini – bass guitar; Salvatore Garau – drums |
| 1993 re-union | Umberto Fiori – vocals; Franco Fabbri – guitar, synth guitar, vocals; Carlo De Martini – violin; Tommaso Leddi – keyboards, violin, balalajka, guitar; Pino Martini – bass guitar; Salvatore Garau – drums |

== Discography ==
=== Albums ===
- Le Idee di Oggi Per la Musica di Domani (1969, LP, First)
- L'Unitá (1972, LP, First)
- Guarda giù dalla pianura (1974, LP, Ariston)
- Un Biglietto del Tram (1975, LP, L'Orchestra)
- Cliché (1976, LP, L'Orchestra)
- L'Apprendista (1977, LP, L'Orchestra)
- Macchina Maccheronica (1980, LP, L'Orchestra)
- Al Volo (1982, LP, L'Orchestra)
- Un Concerto (1995, CD, Arpa/Sensible)

=== Singles ===
- "Oggi Piango" / "Il Mondo è Pieno di Gente" (1967, 7", Mini)
- "Lui Verrà" / "L'amico e il Fico" (1967, 7", Mini)
- "La Luna è Stanca" / "Lodi" (1970, 7", First)
- "Alice Nel Vento" / "Il Venditore di Fumo" (1970, 7", First)
- "Rossella" / "Leone" (1971, 7", First)
- "Garibaldi" / "Tre Fratelli Contadini di Venosa" (1972, 7", First)
- "Sotto il Bambù" / "Nicola fa il Maestro di Scuola" (1972, 7", First)
- "1789" / "Carmine" (1976, 7", L'Orchestra)
- "Cosa Danno" / "Reparto Novità" (1981, 7", L'Orchestra)

== See also ==
- Romantic Warriors II: A Progressive Music Saga About Rock in Opposition
- Romantic Warriors II: Special Features DVD
