= Sliver of a Sun =

Studio album by IZZ
- Released: 1998
- Recorded: 1998
- Studio: Underground Studios NY
- Genre: Progressive rock
- Length: 58:41
- Label: Doone Records
- Producer: Tom Galgano

IZZ chronology
Sliver of a Sun (1998)	I Move (2002)

Professional ratings
Review scores
Source	Rating
Allmusic	link

Sliver of a Sun is the debut album by IZZ, released in 1998. The tracks range from the progressive rock styles of groups such as Emerson, Lake & Palmer, Genesis, Yes, and King Crimson to Beatles-esque pop to ambient. One interesting aspect of the band is its use of two drummers on most tracks.

The title of the album appears in the lyrics of the song "Razor."

== Track listing ==
1. "Endless Calling" – 5:07
2. "I Get Lost" – 4:41
3. "Lornadoone" – 4:13
4. "She Walked Out the Door" – 2:59
5. "Assurance" – 9:02
6. "Take It Higher" – 3:13
7. "Double Bass" – 2:23
8. "Just a Girl" – 4:16
9. "Meteor" – 5:20
10. "Razor" – 7:00
11. "Where I Belong" – 10:19

== Personnel ==
- Tom Galgano - vocals, piano, synthesizers, acoustic and electric guitars
- John Galgano - electric and acoustic guitars, electric bass, hollering
- Brian Coralian - electronic and acoustic percussion, acoustic drumset, whooping, scream of fear
- Greg DiMiceli - acoustic drumset and percussion, whooping
- Philip Gaita - electric bass, acoustic and electric guitars, piccolo bass, fretless electric bass
- Paul Bremner - nylon string and electric guitars
- Michele Salustri - background vocals, admonishing
- Danielle Altieri - lead and background vocals, flute, complaining
