= List of invisible artworks =

This is a list of invisible artworks; that is, works of art that cannot be seen and, in many cases, touched.

== Invisible artworks ==
Artist	Title	Year	Description
Alphonse Allais	“Premières communions de jeunes filles chlorotiques par un temps de neige” (First Communion of Anaemic Young Girls in the Snow)	1883	This work consisted of a sheet of plain white paper. The joke: the “scene” was entirely invisible, leaving it to the imagination of the viewer. It’s one of the earliest examples of invisible art, predating 20th-century conceptual art.
Yves Klein	"Zone de Sensibilité Picturale Immatérielle" (Zone of Immaterial Pictorial Sensibility)	1959	Consists of the sale of documentation of ownership of empty space; the piece was born in a ritual in which the buyers would burn said documentation. Later, in 2022, an unburned receipt for these ‘works of art’ was sold at auction for £1.2m.
Marinus Boezem	"Show V: Immateriële ruimte" (Immaterial space)	1965	Consists of three "air doors" made from currents of cold and warm air blown into the room.
Michael Asher	"Vertical Column of Accelerated Air"	1966	Drafts of pressurized air.
Art & Language (group)	"Air-Conditioning Show" or "Air Show"	1967	An empty room with two air conditioning units; the artwork is "what is felt and said about it", and not anything tangible.
James Lee Byars	"The Ghost of James Lee Byars"	1969	The artwork itself is the emptiness and darkness of a pitch-black room.
Robert Barry	"Telepathic Piece"	1969	An artwork "the nature of which is a series of thoughts that are not applicable to language or image", which Barry would communicate telepathically to visitors during the exhibit.
Yoko Ono	"One-Woman-Show"	1971	Announcement in the December 2 issue of the Village Voice of non-existent exhibition at MoMA in New York.
Chris Burden	"White Light/White Heat"	1975	A 22-day performance at Ronald Feldman Gallery in which the artist lay on a high platform just below the ceiling, remaining out of sight.
Ed Ruscha	"Rocky II"	c. 1979	Sculpture positioned by the artist at an unknown location in the Mojave Desert, Nevada.
Andy Warhol	"Invisible Sculpture"	1985	Consists of an invisible, intangible sculpture atop a white pedestal.
Gianni Motti	"Magic Ink"	1989	A series of drawings sketched with a special ink that was visible only for a brief instant before vanishing.
Maurizio Cattelan	"Untitled"	1991	Police report of stolen invisible artwork.
Tom Friedman	"Untitled (A Curse)"	1992	Similar to Warhol's sculpture, but a witch was reportedly hired to curse the space immediately above the pedestal.
Martin Creed	"Work No. 227: The lights going on and off"	2000	Empty gallery room in which the lights are switched on and off every five seconds, periodically rendering the space fully dark and empty.
Teresa Margolles	"Aire" (Air)	2003	Similar to Air Show, the artwork consists of a room with air humidified with water used to wash corpses before autopsy.
Jeppe Hein	"Invisible Labyrinth"	2005	A maze with invisible and intangible walls; visitors are given headphones that vibrate when they "touch" a wall.
Roman Ondak	"More Silent Than Ever"	2006	The artwork consists of a covert listening device supposedly hidden somewhere in the (empty) exhibition room: visitors are told they are being eavesdropped. The device itself cannot be seen, and no evidence is given that it really exists.
Salvatore Garau	"Buddha in Contemplazione" (Buddha in Contemplation)	2021	An invisible, intangible sculpture.
Salvatore Garau	"Io Sono" (I am)	2021	Another invisible, intangible sculpture, that occupies a square area with a side of 5 ft (1.5 m).
Ruben Gutierrez	"This Sculpture Makes Me Cry (A Spell)"	2022	An immaterial, invisible sculpture atop a small white pedestal, displayed as part of a bigger exhibit. It is said to represent what the artist cannot see, but which affects him emotionally, making him feel invisible and insignificant.

== See also ==
- Conceptual art
  - Anti-art
- No Show Museum
