= I Move =

Studio album by IZZ
- Released: March 5, 2002
- Genre: Progressive rock
- Length: 73:05
- Label: Doone Records
- Producer: Tom Galgano

IZZ chronology
Sliver of a Sun (1998)	I Move (2002)	Ampersand, Volume 1 (2004)

I Move is the second album by IZZ, released in 2002. Although the music is primarily progressive rock with apparent influences by King Crimson and Yes, the band also incorporates a fair amount of pop and even Celtic rock. There is great variety from song to song, from gentle ballads ("Light From Your Eyes") to wild and complex instrumental workouts ("Star Evil Gnoma Su").

== Track listing ==
1. "Spinnin' Round" – 2:59
2. "I Move" – 5:24
3. "Weak Little Lad" – 3:50
4. "I Already Know" – 3:55
5. "I Wanna Win" – 5:46
6. "All the New" – 1:24
7. "Star Evil Gnoma Su" – 8:37
8. "Another Door" – 4:42
9. "Something True" – 2:37
10. "Believe" – 3:33
11. "Knight of Nights" – 6:37
12. "The Mists of Dalriada" – 2:42
13. "Oh, How It's Great!" – 4:46
14. "Coming Like Light" – 11:40
15. "Light from Your Eyes" – 4:24

== Personnel ==
- Tom Galgano - keyboards, lead and backing vocals
- Paul Bremner - electric and acoustic guitar
- Brian Coralian - electronic and acoustic percussion, drum programming
- Greg DiMiceli - acoustic percussion
- John Galgano - bass, acoustic and electric guitar, backing and lead vocals

with

- Laura Meade - vocals on "Believe"
- Anmarie Byrnes - vocals on "I Wanna Win" and "Something True"
- Paige Rigilano - spoken word on "I Wanna Win"
- Abigail Lombino - spoken word on "Coming Like Light"
- Aaron Lofaro - conductor of string section on "Knight of Nights"
