= Dave Kerman =

American musician, composer and record company executive

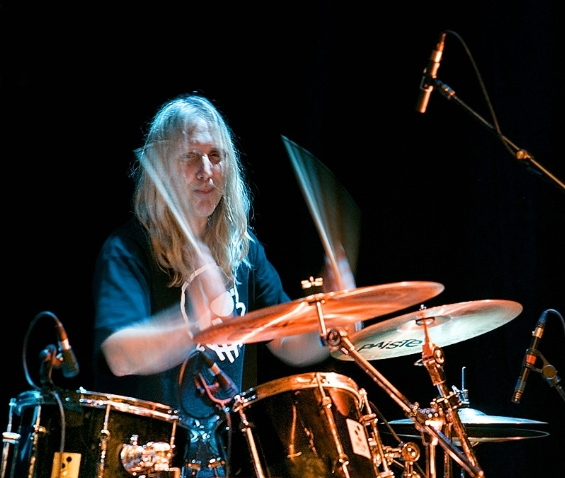
- Dave Kerman with Present Acoustic performing at a RIO Festival in Southern France, April 2007

Background information
- Also known as: Josh
- Born: David Kerman; August 24, 1959 (age 67); California, U.S.
- Genre: Avant-rock
- Occupations: Musician; composer; record company executive
- Instruments: Drums; guitar; keyboards
- Years active: 1976–present
- Labels: Recommended; Cuneiform
- Website: davekerman.net

David Kerman (born August 24, 1959) is an American experimental rock drummer and composer, best known as the founder and member of the Los Angeles avant-rock group 5uu's. He is also a member of the Belgian progressive rock band Present and the Israeli avant-rock band Ahvak. Kerman has been a member of the United States bands U Totem and Thinking Plague, and the Dutch band Blast. He has collaborated with several musicians, including Bob Drake, Chris Cutler and Fred Frith.

Kerman lived in Israel between 2000 and 2003 and holds dual American and Israeli citizenship. He established RēR USA in 2003, the North American distributor of the British independent record label, Recommended Records, and RēR USA's own record label, AD Hoc Records in 2006.

== Biography ==
Dave Kerman was born in Torrance, California, south of Los Angeles. At the age of six he started playing with the drum sticks, and at nine he auditioned for a percussionist in his school band. In spite of failing the audition, Grateful Dead keyboardist Keith Godchaux, family friend and neighbor, recognised potential in Kerman and suggested to Kerman's parents that they buy him a set of drums. Kerman's first public performance was at the age of 10 with a band of his that he had entered in a local talent contest.

In high school, Kerman formed a garage band with guitarist Greg Conway and bassist Jon Beck. They began as a cover band playing a mixture of Deep Purple, King Crimson and Lynyrd Skynyrd songs but soon switched to experimenting with noise music. Kerman also modified his drum kit to extend its capabilities, including adding telescoping metal tubing that changed pitch (made from old fire extinguishers), and stringing the bass drum shell with heavy-gauge strings that produced an un-tuned zither sound. He also started using a variety of objects to strike his drum kit with, including kitchen utensils, golf clubs and Barbie dolls.

In 1976 Kerman's band named themselves "Farmer Fred Genuflects to A-440" and played at a Greenpeace Festival in San Diego, California. While their performance did not go down very well, one concert goer recognised potential and suggested they listen to Henry Cow and Faust. These new influences prompted Kerman to begin exploring new compositional techniques and he started writing experimental songs for his band. Even though Kerman was a drummer, he taught himself guitar and keyboards to compose on.

After finishing school, Kerman attended California State University, Dominguez Hills where he studied electronic and contemporary music under professors Marshall Bialosky and David Champion. At the time he also studied audio engineering at the Sound-Master Institute with Brian Ingoldsby.

=== 5uu's ===
By the early 1980s Kerman's band was playing progressive rock and took on the name 5uu's. They began recording their first album in 1984 and went on to make eight more albums, an EP and a single. 5uu's were also regularly featured on Recommended Records' Quarterly Magazine installments, with specially commissioned pieces, which were available nowhere else. The band toured 25 cities in Western Europe and 14 cities in Eastern Europe during 1995. The 5uu's has been Kerman's principal band, for which he is best known. He composes most of the music for this group.

=== Other bands and projects ===
In 1988 the 5uu's and another Los Angeles band, Motor Totemists Guild merged to form U Totem to play at the Frankfurt Art Rock Festival in Germany. U Totem toured Europe and North America and made two albums, and Kerman remained with the band until its demise in 1994. While in Europe with U Totem in 1993, guitarist/composer Roger Trigaux of the Belgian progressive rock band Present, asked Kerman to replace drummer Daniel Denis, who was leaving. Kerman joined Present and has remained with the band ever since, appearing on their 2009 DVD and on five of their albums. He has also toured Europe and North America with them several times.

In 1989 Bob Drake from the Denver based avant-rock group Thinking Plague left the band and moved to Los Angeles where he met Kerman. Kerman had been interested in Thinking Plague's music and moved to Denver in 1989 to join the band. He remained with Thinking Plague for eleven years, performed live with them at NEARfest 2000 and is featured on three of their albums.

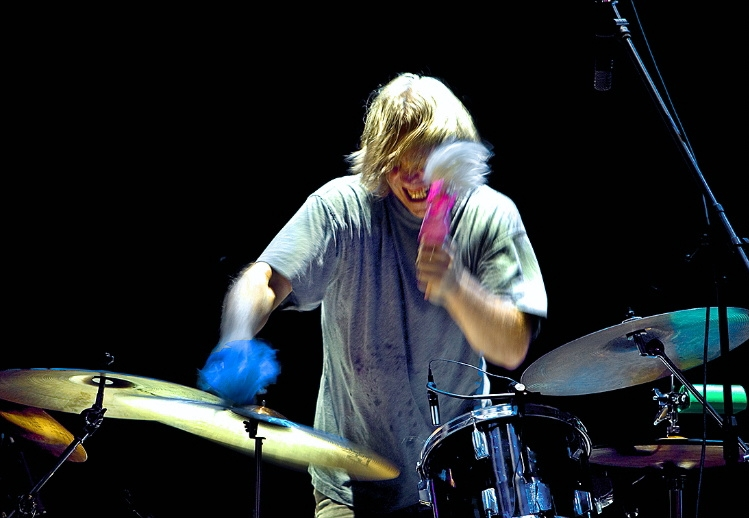
Dave Kerman (with Barbie dolls) performing with Present at NEARFest, July 2005.

When U Totem broke up in 1993, Kerman reformed the 5uu's with Drake and Sanjay Kumar. In 1994 Kerman and Drake moved into an old unoccupied farm house in Caudeval in southern France owned by ex-Henry Cow drummer Chris Cutler and sound engineer EM (Maggie) Thomas. Cutler and Thomas had purchased the farm a few years earlier with a view to using it as a recording studio. Kerman and Drake undertook the task of renovating and converting the farm house, and it was named Studio Midi-Pyrenees, with Drake the resident engineer/producer. In 1996 Kerman joined the Dutch avant-garde band Blast, recorded one album and toured Europe and North America with them.

In 2000 Kerman relocated to Tel Aviv in Israel where he teamed up with engineer/producer Udi Koomran to continue work with the 5uu's. He also spent much of his time working as a composer for the Israeli Batsheva Dance Company. In 2002 Kerman and Koomran started a new band in Israel called Ahvak (Hebrew for "Dust") in a similar vein to U Totem and Thinking Plague. Ahvak played at the Tritonale Festival in Paris in 2004 and released a self-titled album the same year.

In 2002 Kerman wrote a series of editorials on progressive rock for Exposé, a United States quarterly music publication, entitled "Earth to Josh: Prog Is Dead" (Exposé #25, September 2002), "The Further Adventures of Josh" (Exposé #26, February 2003) and "The continuing story of Josh" (Exposé #27, August 2003).

Kerman moved back to Denver in 2003 where he guested on Thinking Plague's A History of Madness (2003). He also established RēR USA in Denver in 2003, the North American distributor of the Chris Cutler's British independent record label, Recommended Records. In 2006 he created RēR USA's own record label, AD Hoc Records.

In 2007 Kerman joined Bob Drake's Cabinet of Curiosities, a live band comprising Drake (guitar, vocals, violin, banjo), David Campbell (guitar, bass, vocals) and Kerman (drums), plus a few guest musicians for each performance. In June 2007 they played at NEARfest in Pennsylvania with guests Olivier Tejedor (keyboards) and Lynnette Shelley (vocals) and then undertook a Midwest/ East Coast tour in Autumn of 2008. By April 2008 Kerman had re-joined Thinking Plague after a seven year absence. During that month the band performed a series of concerts in Paris, Frankfurt, Geneva, Milan and at the Gouveia Festival in Portugal.

In September 2009, Kerman became a member of Aranis, a critically acclaimed, Flemish chamber-rock group, which played frequent concerts in Europe, and at NEARfest in the USA. His tenure with the group ended in October, 2013.

Kerman relocated to Switzerland in 2010. Throughout 2011 and 2012, he toured Europe as part of the Swiss music/art troupe, Les Reines prochaines. Also during this period he produced and played drums and guitars on their studio album, "Blut", which was released in February 2013.

In Summer 2013, Kerman joined the Zürich-based band, Stepmother, which includes Bill Gilonis (The Work, News From Babel), Jeroen Visser (The Nudes, Cedric Vuille) and Lukas Simonis (Vril, Dull Schicksall). He also plays drums for the Basel-based bands, Dave From Hollywood, Aie Ca Gicle, Mrs. Understanding, and Ludwigs Mondlichtkapelle.

== Selected discography ==
With 5uu's

- The Quiet In Your Bones (2022, Digital LP, Cuneiform Records, US)
- Bel Marduk & Tiamat (1986, LP, U:r Records, US)
- Bar Code (1987, 7", Rotary Totem Records, US)
- Elements (with Motor Totemist Guild) (1988, LP, Rotary Totem Records, US)
- Hunger's Teeth (1994, CD, Recommended Records, UK)
- Crisis in Clay (1997, CD, Recommended Records, UK)
- Regarding Purgatories (2000, CD, Cuneiform Records, US)
- Abandonship (2002, CD, Cuneiform Records, US)
- Tel Aviv Construction Events 1–3 (2004, online download-only EP, Recommended Records,
- Live At AKW Würzburg (2023, Digital, Cuneiform Records, US) US)

With Dave From Hollywood

- "Wax A Hot One" (2017, LP, Konkord Records, Austria)

With Les Reines Prochaines

- "Blut" (2013, CD, Un-Records, Germany)

With U Totem

- U Totem (1990, CD, Cuneiform Records, US)
- Strange Attractors (1994, CD, Cuneiform Records, US)

With Bob Drake

- What Day is It? (1994, CD, Crumbling Tombs, US)
- Bob's Drive-In (2011, CD, Recommended Records, UK)

With Present

- Live (1996, CD, Cuneiform Records, US)
- No 6 (1999, CD, Carbon 7, Belgium)
- High Infidelity (2001, CD, Carbon 7, Belgium)
- A Great Inhumane Adventure (2005, CD, Cuneiform Records, US)
- Barbaro (ma non troppo) (2009, CD + DVD, Ad Hoc Records, US)

With Blast

- Stringy Rugs (1997, CD, Cuneiform Records, US)

With Thinking Plague

- In Extremis (1998, CD, Cuneiform Records, US)
- Upon Both Your Houses (live at NEARfest 2000) (2004, CD, NEARfest Records, US)

With Ahvak

- Ahvak (2004, CD, Cuneiform Records, US)

With Aranis

- RoqueForte (2010, CD, altrOck Productions, Italy)

With Stepmother

- Calvary Greetings (2015, LP, CD, Knock'emdead Records, US)

== Other featured recordings ==
- N.I.M.B.Y.: Songs For Adults
- Motor Totemist Guild: Contact With Veils
- Motor Totemist Guild: Shapuno Zoo
- Motor Totemist Guild: Omaggio a Futi
- Motor Totemist Guild: City of Mirrors
- Motor Totemist Guild: All-America City
- Fred Frith: Prints
- Fred Frith: Place of General Happiness
- A.A. Kismet: What's the Use of Crying When the Wolves Have Arrived?
- Noisemaker's Fife: Corpse
- Rascal Reporters: Happy Accidents
- Pox: Borgnine
- Yugen: Iridule
- Yugen: Laborinto d'Aqua
- Thinking Plague: A History of Madness
- IZ: Em
- Hail: Kirk
- Recommended Records Quarterly Magazine: Vol.1 #1
- Recommended Records Quarterly Magazine: Vol.2 #2
- Recommended Records Quarterly Magazine: Vol.3 #3
- Recommended Records Quarterly Magazine: Selections From Vol.1
- Recommended Records Quarterly Magazine: Selections From Vol.2
- 5uu's: Hoketemists – ReR #33 Subscription Item
- 5uu's: Die Ind Austria Report #3
- 5uu's: KXLU Radio Archives
- 5uu's: Bad Alchemy #6
- 5uu's: A Beginner's Guide To COMA
- U Totem: COS Magazine Japan
- U Totem: Eyesores – A Stab At The Residents
- U Totem: Unsettled Scores
- U Totem: Cuneiform Sampler #1
- U Totem: Cuneiform Sampler #2

== Film appearances ==
- Les Reines Prochaines: "Alleine denken ist kriminell" DVD (2014)
- Les Reines Prochaines: "Dings" - live concert footage/ documentary DVD (2015)
- Les Reines Prochaines & Friends: "Gottlieben Revue" DVD (2014)
- Romantic Warriors II: A Progressive Music Saga About Rock in Opposition (2012)
- Romantic Warriors II: Special Features DVD (2013)
- Present: "Barbaro, ma non troppo" – live concert DVD (2008)
- Present: "NEARfest 2005" - live concert DVD (2007)
