= Salvatore Garau =

Italian artist (born 1953)

- Born: 1953 (age 72–73); Santa Giusta, Sardinia, Italy
- Education: Accademia di Belle Arti di Firenze
- Known for: contemporary art

Salvatore Garau (born 1953) is an Italian artist from the Mediterranean island of Sardinia.

== Life ==
Garau was born in Santa Giusta, in the province of Oristano in the Mediterranean island of Sardinia, Italy. He studied at the Accademia di Belle Arti di Firenze, where he graduated in 1974. In 1977 he became the drummer of the progressive rock group Stormy Six. After the group disbanded he became a visual artist.

== Work ==
Garau had his first solo show in 1984. He participated in the 50th Biennale di Venezia in 2003 and showed work at the European Parliament in Strasbourg in the same year.

In 2005 he painted an abstract work on a 200 m^{2} sheet of PVC, which was then hung to cover the scaffolding on a building in Corso Magenta in Milan. For his installation Ichthys Sacro Stagno in Sardinia in 2006, he created large pools on the floors of three churches in towns in the province of Oristano, which he then populated with fish from nearby ponds. In 2009 he had a solo show at the Musée d'art moderne et contemporain of Saint-Etienne, in France.

In 2021 his "immaterial sculpture" – a work consisting of nothing at all, entitled Io sono ("I am") – was sold in Milan for £12,000 net of commission and expenses.

His work is in the collections of several museums including the Museo del Novecento (formerly in the Civico Museo d'Arte Contemporanea), the Museo d'Arte Moderna di Bologna and the Padiglione d'Arte Contemporanea in Milan.

== See also ==
- List of invisible artworks
