= Sounds from the Gathering =

Studio album by Cobweb Strange
- Released: October 1998
- Genre: Progressive rock
- Length: 49:29
- Label: Genterine Records
- Producer: Wade Summerlin

Cobweb Strange chronology
The Temptation of Successive Hours (1996)	Sounds from the Gathering (1998)	Seamless Selections (2002)

Professional ratings
Review scores
Source	Rating
AllMusic	3/5 stars

Sounds from the Gathering is the second full-length studio album by the band Cobweb Strange and was released in October 1998. Unlike their first album The Temptation of Successive Hours, which only had one international single, multiple songs from Sounds from the Gathering received radio airplay internationally.

== Track listing ==
No.	Title	Writer(s)	Length
1.	"Taste of Ash"	Wade Summerlin	2:44
2.	"Sometimes the Shine Just Fades Away"	D. Rinehart, K. Rinehart, Wade Summerlin	10:35
3.	"I'd Give Everything"	Wade Summerlin	4.25
4.	"Thirteen"	D. Rinehart, K. Rinehart, Wade Summerlin	6:45
5.	"The Color of"	Wade Summerlin	6:17
6.	"...As the Sky Crumbles"	Wade Summerlin	3:57
7.	"Solitude & the Hollow Promise"	D. Rinehart, K. Rinehart, Wade Summerlin	7:38
8.	"A Cup to Catch the Silence"	Wade Summerlin	6:57

== Personnel ==
- Wade Summerlin – lead vocals, bass guitar, acoustic guitar
- Derik Rinehart – drums, backing vocals
- Keith Rinehart – lead guitar
- Trevon Broad – cello, keyboards
