= Claudio Rocchi =

Italian composer

Claudio Rocchi (8 January 1951 – 18 June 2013) was an Italian progressive rock singer-songwriter, musician and radio host.

Born in Milan, at young age Rocchi was a bassist in the group Stormy Six, with whom he recorded their first album in 1968, Le idee di oggi per la musica di domani. In 1970, he started a solo career, publishing the album Viaggio. In 1971, he released the album Volo Magico numero 1, with which he became a constant presence in all the meetings and the rock festivals of the time. The album was referred as "one of the definitive albums of the Italian psychedelic music, perhaps the only true classic of the genre ever produced in our country". He retired in the early 1980s, as a result of personal choices, and then came back in the 1990s. His last album was In Alto, published in 2011. He was also a radio host, best known for the musical program Per voi giovani. Rocchi even founded the first free radio of Nepal "The Himalayan Broadcasting Company", of which he was director for three years. He died on 18 June 2013, at the age of 62, of an incurable degenerative disease.
