= IZZ =

American progressive rock band

IZZ is a New York-based progressive rock band. Its music is inspired by such classic progressive groups as Genesis, Yes, King Crimson, Emerson, Lake & Palmer, and Renaissance and is often infused with pop hooks à la The Beatles. The band's name comes from the nickname of baseball relief pitcher Jason Isringhausen, who was once on the New York Mets, a team favored by John Galgano.

The group has performed at American progressive rock festivals RoSfest, NEARfest, The Rogue Independent Music Festival, CalProg, and ProgDay.

IZZ's album Crush of Night, released in May 2012, serves as part 2 of a 3-part series of thematic albums that began with The Darkened Room in 2009. It features a guest appearance by Gary Green of Gentle Giant on "Words and Miracles" (electric guitar, guitar solos and backing vocals) and "The Crush of Night" (guitar solo).

== Current members ==
- Tom Galgano - keyboards, vocals
- John Galgano - bass, guitar, vocals, keyboards
- Paul Bremner - guitars
- Greg DiMiceli - acoustic drums, percussion
- Brian Coralian - acoustic and electronic drums, percussion
- Anmarie Byrnes - vocals
- Laura Meade - vocals

== Discography ==
- Sliver of a Sun. Liquid, 1998.
- I Move. Outburst Records, 2002.
- Ampersand Volume 1. Doone Records, 2004.
- My River Flows. Doone Records, 2005.
- IZZ Live at NEARfest. Doone Records, 2007.
- The Darkened Room. Doone Records, 2009.
- Crush of Night. Doone Records, 2012.
- Everlasting Instant. Doone Records, 2015.
- Ampersand, Volume 2. Doone Records, 2016.
- Don't Panic. Doone Records, 2019.
- Half Life (EP). Doone Records, 2020.
- I Move (Anniversary Edition), 2023.
- Collapse The Wave. Doone Records, 2024.
