= Romantic Warriors II: A Progressive Music Saga About Rock in Opposition =

2012 documentary film

- DVD cover
- Directed by: Adele Schmidt; José Zegarra Holder
- Written by: Adele Schmidt; José Zegarra Holder
- Produced by: Mike Potter
- Starring: Chris Cutler; Bob Drake; Franco Fabbri; Giorgio Gomelsky; Marc Hollander; Mike Johnson; Dave Kerman; Carla Kihlstedt; Marcello Marinone; Ferdinand Richard; Christian Vander; Joris Vanvinckenroye; Dave Willey; Francesco Zago
- Narrated by: Roland Millman
- Cinematography: Adele Schmidt; José Zegarra Holder
- Music by: Aranis; Art Zoyd; Etron Fou Leloublan; Guapo; Hamster Theatre; Henry Cow; Magma; Miriodor; Once Upon a Time in Belgium; Present; Ruins Alone; Samla Mammas Manna; Sleepytime Gorilla Museum; Stormy Six; Thinking Plague; Univers Zero; Yugen
- Distributed by: Zeitgeist Media
- Release date: 2012
- Running time: 98 min.
- Country: United States
- Languages: English; French (English subtitles)

Romantic Warriors II: A Progressive Music Saga About Rock in Opposition is a 2012 feature-length documentary film about the Rock in Opposition movement of the late 1970s, the music genre it spawned, and the influence it has on experimental groups across the world. The film was written and directed by Adele Schmidt and José Zegarra Holder, and was released in the United States by Zeitgeist Media. It premiered in Washington, D.C., on September 28, 2012. The film was generally well received by critics, with a reviewer at AllMusic saying that it "covers all the points an aficionado could possibly want".

Romantic Warriors II is a sequel to Zeitgeist Media's 2010 documentary on progressive rock by Schmidt and Holder, Romantic Warriors: A Progressive Music Saga. In 2013 Zeitgeist also released Romantic Warriors II: Special Features DVD, comprising additional material filmed during the making of Romantic Warriors II. A third installment in the series, Romantic Warriors III: Canterbury Tales was released in April 2015.

== Background ==
Adele Schmidt and José Zegarra Holder are co-founders of Zeitgeist Media LLC, a video production company based in Washington, D.C. Schmidt has produced several films, including a documentary on Albert Schweitzer, Albert Schweitzer: Called to Africa (2006), which won the 2008 Gabriel Award and the 2009 Telly Award.

Romantic Warriors II took two years to make, and was started by Schmidt and Holder soon after the release of its predecessor, Romantic Warriors in 2010.

== Synopsis ==
Romantic Warriors II: A Progressive Music Saga About Rock in Opposition comprises interviews with people involved with or connected to Rock in Opposition (RIO), and archival and contemporary concert footage of RIO and RIO-related bands. RIO was formed in 1978 when English experimental rock group Henry Cow invited four similar bands from Europe to perform at a festival in London, Etron Fou Leloublan (France), Samla Mammas Manna (Sweden), Stormy Six (Italy) and Univers Zero (Belgium). Chris Cutler of Henry Cow explains in an interview that experimental groups of the day had no outlet for their music because they were ignored by the major record labels. The purpose of RIO was to share resources amongst its members and organize concerts for each other across Europe. The film features each of the original RIO groups with archival performance footage and present-day interviews with some of the band members. French progressive rock band Magma is also featured, and while never a member of RIO, the film shows how Magma operated outside the music industry and were a big influence on RIO.

In 1979 three more bands were added to RIO, Aksak Maboul (Belgium), Art Zoyd (France) and Art Bears (England, ex-Henry Cow members). By 1980 RIO had stopped functioning as an organization. Cutler adds that RIO had made its point, but that the support structures it had established continued to operate, and new bands were formed and functioned in the RIO tradition. Independent record labels sprang up to continue the work of RIO by promoting unknown and obscure musicians, including Recommended Records, formed by Cutler in England, Crammed Discs by Marc Hollander of Aksak Maboul in Belgium, and Cuneiform Records by Steve Feigenbaum in the United States.

Giorgio Gomelsky (former manager of The Yardbirds and The Rolling Stones) also features in the film. Gomelsky helped Magma open up a tour circuit in France, and then moved to New York City, where he opened the US market to European bands in much the same way that RIO did in London. Magma, Univers Zero and Etron Fou Leloublan all played at venues created by Gomelsky, and the New York avant-garde music scene that sprang up paved the way for the creation of new experimental bands in North America. Miriodor, Thinking Plague, Hamster Theatre and Sleepytime Gorilla Museum all operated in the spirit of RIO. Dave Kerman and Mike Johnson of Thinking Plague both cite Henry Cow as having an influence on their music, and Carla Kihlstedt of Sleepytime Gorilla Museum explains the effect Fred Frith, Professor of Composition and former Henry Cow member, had on her music at Mills College, California.

Feigenbaum shows how RIO became a music genre that was used to describe bands and musicians directly or indirectly related to the original RIO bands, or influenced by those bands. This "style of music" is often called "avant-prog", and is a subgenre of progressive rock. The film discusses the formation of Present and Aranis in Belgium. Present was started by some of the members of Univers Zero, and Aranis cited Univers Zero as an influence. Kerman later joined Present, and in 2011, Univers Zero, Present and Aranis joined forces to create a 17-member acoustic chamber rock group called Once Upon a Time in Belgium.

An RIO "reunion" festival was held in Carmaux, France in 2007, and has since been held there again in 2009, 2010, 2011, 2012 and 2013. These festivals featured a number of RIO and RIO-related bands, including Magma, Present, Aranis, Guapo, Ruins Alone, Univers Zero, Sleepytime Gorilla Museum, Miriodor and Yugen. The film features performances by some of the bands at the 2011 festival, including the premiere of Once Upon a Time in Belgium.

== Reception ==
Professional ratings
Review scores
Source	Rating
AllMusic	4/5 stars
Babyblaue Seiten	12/15 stars
Educational Media Reviews Online	highly recommended
Prog-Sphere	favorable
The Rocktologist	9/10

Dave Lynch at AllMusic wrote that in this film Zeitgeist does a good job in explaining why interest in Rock in Opposition, and the music associated with it, has persisted to this day since its appearance in the late 1970s. Lynch said that while the documentary is "smartly paced and covers all the points an aficionado could possibly want", he lamented the fact that there was only space for short excerpts of the often complex music.

Vincent J. Novara, Curator and Special Collections in Performing Arts at the University of Maryland, wrote in a review at Educational Media Reviews Online that Romantic Warriors II is "far superior to its predecessor in terms of scope and focus". He said that the "extensive and generous performance footage" gives the viewer a good feel for the music, and makes up for the sometimes "vague and ineffectual" descriptions by the narrator. While Novara felt that the quality of some of the performance footage and interviews where Skype was used are lacking, he said that overall the film "is quite inspiring and informative for those interested in exploring the outer edges of rock music [and] certainly has a place in any library supporting popular music studies".

A review in The Rocktologist magazine said that the film "does an excellent job in explaining the philosophy behind the movement", and that it is "[d]efinitely a must see for any fan of innovative, forward-thinking and challenging music". The Prog-Sphere website called Romantic Warriors II "an outstanding piece of filmmaking", and said that it will appeal to a wider audience than the first film because "[t]he music’s very combination of the arty, the quirky and the academically austere will attract people who appreciate forms of non-mainstream music that do not necessarily fall under the 'progressive rock' umbrella – including modern classical".

== Romantic Warriors series ==
- Romantic Warriors: A Progressive Music Saga (2010)
- Romantic Warriors II: A Progressive Music Saga About Rock in Opposition (2012)
- Romantic Warriors III: Canterbury Tales (2015)
- Romantic Warriors IV: Krautrock (2019, three parts)
