= A Breath of October =

Studio album by Cobweb Strange
- Released: 2002
- Genre: Progressive rock
- Length: 49:50
- Label: Genterine

Cobweb Strange chronology
Seamless Selections (2002)	A Breath of October (2002)

A Breath of October is a studio album by the band Cobweb Strange.

== Track listing ==
Source: Allmusic

No.	Title	Length
1.	"The Drowning Pulse of the Cold Green Sea"	9:02
2.	"Giant"	5:14
3.	"The Empty Shell"	5:08
4.	"Tea for the Sleepless"	6:34
5.	"Pure"	11:50
6.	"Currents of Nightshade"	4:00
7.	"On with the Show"	6:43
8.	"With Evening Falling"	1:17
