= Cobweb Strange =

US musical group

Cobweb Strange is an American progressive rock / goth band based in Atlanta, Georgia.

== History ==
Cobweb Strange released the self-produced Thoughts Under Glass EP in 1995. The release along with the band's live performances generated interest from several independent record labels leading to a relationship with the record company CPR. In 1996, CPR released the band's debut LP, The Temptation of Successive Hours which received little commercial radio airplay in the United States; however, the song Astral Projection from the album did well on the radio in Europe. Despite lack of commercial radio support in the United States, college radio play and favorable articles in progressive rock magazines allowed the band to have success on tour. The band then moved to Genterine Records for their second album, Sounds from the Gathering (1998), which was met with similar favor and led to the band's first television performance on the show DoVidOx as well as several performances at summer festivals including the Rock-a-thon 2000 festival in New Orleans, Louisiana. It was the third release from Cobweb Strange, A Breath of October (2002), that saw the band reach its full potential. The single "Currents of Nightshade" received radio play on both progressive rock and goth radio programs. The video for the song appeared on the Ghost Notes (2004) compilation, which was included with each copy of the Summer 2004 issue of Progression Magazine, the leading magazine for the genre. The song also appeared on the soundtrack for the film She Demons of the Black Sun (2006). In addition to being an important year for the band for the release of A Breath of October, 2002 was also the first year that the band performed at The Rogue Independent Music Festival. They were the only band to perform at the festival every year.

== Personnel ==
- Wade Summerlin - Bass Guitar, Acoustic Guitar, Lead Vocals
- Holly Williams – Guitar
- Brandi Byrum – Keyboards
- Soumen Talukder – Drums

=== Former Members ===
- Derik Rinehart - Drums and Backing Vocals (on The Temptation of Successive Hours and Sounds From the Gathering)
- Keith Rinehart - Electric Guitar (on Sounds From the Gathering)
- Jonathan Burke - Guitar, Vocals (on The Temptation of Successive Hours)
- Rob Dwyer - Guitar (Brief replacement for Jonathan; Performed one show in Atlanta in April 1996)

== Discography ==
Thoughts Under Glass (1995)
The Temptation of Successive Hours (1996)
Sounds from the Gathering (1998)
Seamless Selections (2002)
A Breath of October (2002)

== Sources ==
- sources of information for this Discography include the websites allmusic.com, progarchives.com, progressiveworld.net
- sources of information for this History and Personnel list include the websites allmusic.com, progarchives.com, progressiveworld.net, aural-innovations.com and the print magazine Progression. Member history has been double checked with the member listings on CDs.
