= Franco Fabbri =

Italian musician

Franco Fabbri (born 1949) is a Brazilian-born Italian musician, musicologist and broadcaster.

Born in São Paulo in 1949, from 1965 Fabbri was guitarist, vocalist and composer for Stormy Six, regarded as one of the most interesting Italian progressive bands, and one much admired by the specialist press: in 1980 the group received an award for best rock album of the year from the West German record critics, coming ahead of Police. In addition to making eight albums with Stormy Six, he recorded a number of works of electronic and experimental music.

As musicologist, Fabbri has published on the rapport between music and technology (Elettronica e musica); on music as a 360° phenomenon (Il suono in cui viviamo, recently reprinted in an expanded version by Arcana Editore); on the analysis of popular song (in Fabrizio De André. Accordi eretici and Mina. Una forza incantatrice and in the Einaudi Encyclopedia of music); and on musical genres, published in various books and international journals.

Fabbri has served as chairman of the International Association for the Study of Popular Music (IASPM) and has been involved in the editing of the periodical "Musica/Realtà" and the "Le sfere" series of studies in music. Fabbri currently teaches at University of Turin as well as History of Popular Music at Parma Music Conservatory, and has also taught a course on the economics of the many aspects of music production as part of the Scienze e Tecnologie della Comunicazione Musicale (STCM) degree at the University of Milan. As a broadcaster he became well known as one of the presenters of the RAI Radio3 series Radio Tre Suite. In 2017 he became visiting professor at the University of Huddersfield.

== Bibliography ==
- Elettronica e musica, Fratelli Fabbri, 1984
- Il suono in cui viviamo, Feltrinelli, 1996
- Fabrizio De André. Accordi eretici, Euresis, 1997
- Mina. Una forza incantatrice, Euresis, 1998
- Il suono in cui viviamo, Arcana Editore, 2002 (2nd edition)
- L'ascolto tabù, Milano, il Saggiatore, 2005
- Il Suono in cui viviamo, il Saggiatore, 2008 (3rd Edition)
- Around the Clock, UTET, 2008

== See also ==
- Romantic Warriors II: A Progressive Music Saga About Rock in Opposition
- Romantic Warriors II: Special Features DVD
