= DFA (Italian rock band) =

Progressive rock band from Verona, Italy

- Origin: Verona, Veneto, Italy
- Genres: Progressive rock, jazz-rock, jazz fusion
- Years active: 1991–2009
- Labels: Mellow, MoonJune
- Past members: Alberto De Grandis; Luca Baldassari; Roberto Tommasini; Silvio Minella; Alberto Bonomi

DFA (short for Duty Free Area) was an Italian progressive rock band from Verona, Italy. Their musical style is varied, but has elements of "space rock" bands such as Pink Floyd and jazz-rock fusion bands like Nova or In Cahoots.

== Members ==
=== Past members ===
- Alberto DeGrandis (drums/vocals)
- Luca Baldassari (bass)
- Alberto Bonomi (keyboards/vocals)
- Silvio Minella (guitars)
- Roberto Tommasini (keyboards 1991–1995)

== Discography ==
- Lavori in Corso ("Work in Progress") (Scolopedra, 1997)
- Duty Free Area (Mellow Records, Italy, October 1998)
- Kaleidoscope (Moonjune Records, 2000) First two albums remastered with three new live tracks
- Work in Progress—Live (Moonjune Records, 2001) recorded live on June 21, 2000, at the NEARFest at Lehigh University in Pennsylvania
- 4th (MoonJune Records, 2008)

== Disambiguation ==
The Italian progressive rock band D.F.A. is not related to DFA Records, the Canadian indie-synth rock band Death from Above 1979, Los Angeles metal band Dark Fuckin' Angel or the German electro-punk band D.A.F. (Deutsch Amerikanische Freundschaft).

== References and reviews ==
- http://gnosis2000.net/reviews/dfa.htm
- http://www.reviewcentre.com/reviews140287.html
- https://web.archive.org/web/20080222195242/http://www.progreviews.com/reviews/display.php?rev=dfa-wipl
