= Heresie (album) =

Studio album by Univers Zero
- Released: 1979
- Recorded: March 18–May 24, 1979
- Genre: Rock in Opposition, progressive rock
- Length: 51:43; 63:12 (2010 remaster)
- Label: Cuneiform Records
- Producer: Eric Faes

Univers Zero chronology
1313 (1977)	Heresie (1979)	Ceux du Dehors (1981)

Professional ratings
Review scores
Source	Rating
Allmusic	link

Heresie is the second album by Belgian RIO band Univers Zero released in 1979. (Reissued in 2010 as a remix with bonus track) It features heavy use of dissonance and dark, brooding and extremely complex melodies.

Its title is often written as Hérésie (because in lowercase heresie like a centuries-old version of the word, whereas in another edition of the album, the spelling HERESIE looks it follows a habit of dropping accents when using uppercase, even in today's French).

== Track listing ==
1. "La Faulx" (Daniel Denis) – 25:18
2. "Jack the Ripper" (Daniel Denis, Roger Trigaux) – 13:29
3. "Vous le saurez en temps voulu" (Roger Trigaux) – 12:56
4. "Chaos hermétique" (Roger Trigaux) – 11:52 (bonus track included on the 2010 remaster, recorded in 1975)

"La Faulx" translates as "The Scythe", although it is using an archaic spelling from Middle French; "Vous le saurez en temps voulu" translates as "You'll Know It in Due Course"; "Chaos hermétique" translates as "Hermetic Chaos".

== Personnel ==
- Roger Trigaux: guitar, piano, organ, harmonium
- Guy Segers: bass, voice
- Michel Berckmans: oboe, bassoon
- Patrick Hanappier: violin, viola
- Daniel Denis: drums, percussion

== Production ==
- Produced By Eric Faes
- Engineered By Etienne Conod
- Mixed By Univers Zero & Etienne Conod
- Mastered By Roger Seibel
- Remixed and remastered by Didier de Roos (2010)
