= Farpoint (band) =

- Origin: Dalzell, South Carolina
- Genres: Progressive rock, hard rock, soft rock
- Years active: 1997–2005; 2006-present
- Labels: Starcross Music, 10t Records
- Members: Kevin Jarvis; Rick Walker; Frank Tyson; Dean Hallal; Jennifer Meeks Weich
- Past members: Johnathan Rodriguez; Dana Oxendine; Mike Avins; Clark Boone; Sam Sanders; Abby Thompson; Dave Auerbach
- Website: www.farpointband.com

Farpoint is an American progressive rock band formed in Dalzell, South Carolina in 1997 by Kevin Jarvis and Rick Walker. The band's sound is based on a diversity of influences, ranging from progressive, folk and hard rock to Celtic, classical, new age and bluegrass.

The band has released a total of 7 albums. The first four feature art by visual artist David Frain. The fifth studio album, KINDRED, was released by 10t Records in 2011. Their first live album is Water of Life: Live at the Sumter Opera House, recorded in Sumter, SC in June 2011, released by Starcross Music in July, 2012. Their 6th studio album. PAINT THE DARK, was released by 10t Records in summer of 2014.

== Band members ==
=== Current members ===
Kevin Jarvis - guitars, keys, mandolin, backing vocals (1997–present)
Rick Walker - drums, percussion, backing vocals (1997–2001, 2003–present)
Frank Tyson- bass guitar, backing vocals (1999–present)
Dean Hallal - lead and backing vocals, rhythm guitar (2006–present)
Jennifer Meeks Weich - lead and backing vocals, flute (2006–2011, 2015–present)

=== Past members ===
Johnathan Rodriguez - drums (2001–2003)
Dana Oxendine - vocals, flute (1997–2005)
Mike Avins - lead guitar (2002–2005)
Clark Boone - lead vocals (1999–2005)
Sam Sanders - lead and rhythm guitar (2008–2009)
Abby Thompson - lead and backing vocals, keys (2011–2014)
Dave Auerbach - lead and rhythm guitar (2009–2011, 2015–2016)

Rockin' the Sumter Opera House, June 2011

== Discography ==
=== Studio albums ===
- First Light (2002)
- Grace (2003)
- From Dreaming to Dreaming (2004)
- Cold Star Quiet Star (2008)
- Kindred (2011)
- Paint the Dark (2014)
- The Journey (2022)

=== Live albums ===
- Water of Life: Live at the Sumter Opera House (2012)

=== Compilation albums ===
- Starcrossed (2017)
