= NEARfest =

North East Art Rock Festival held in Pennsylvania, USA, 1999-2012

The North East Art Rock Festival, or NEARfest for short, was a multi-day event celebrating the resurgence of progressive and eclectic music in the United States and around the world. The event was held annually in early summer in Bethlehem, Pennsylvania, approximately one hour north of Philadelphia and less than two hours west of New York City. The festival was founded in the spring of 1998 by Robert LaDuca and Chad Hutchinson, with the first event occurring in 1999. NEARfest quickly grew to become "the most prestigious progressive music festival in the world."

On October 17, 2011, founders Hutchinson and LaDuca, and production manager Kevin Feeley announced that the final edition of the festival, entitled NEARfest Apocalypse, would take place on the weekend of June 22, 23, and 24, 2012 in Bethlehem, Pennsylvania. The lineup for NEARfest Apocalypse was announced live on the long-running Gagliarchives Radio Program on Saturday, October 29, 2011. On May 24, 2012, it was announced that Eloy had to cancel due to medical issues. On May 29, 2012, it was revealed that U.K. would take their place as the Sunday night headliner.

The May 2008 issue of SPIN Magazine listed NEARfest as one of the top 72 festivals in the United States.

NEARfest was operated as a registered 501(c)(3) non-profit organization. The name "NEARfest" is a registered trademark held by co-founder Chad Hutchinson.

== Venues ==
NEARfest was held in Baker Hall, at the Zoellner Arts Center which is located on the campus of Lehigh University in Bethlehem, Pennsylvania (2000–2001, 2004–2012). Baker Hall has a capacity of 1,002 seats in acoustically superior conditions. However, in its inaugural year, NEARfest was held in Foy Hall at Moravian College in Bethlehem, Pennsylvania which has a capacity of 428 seats. In 2002 and 2003, NEARfest was held in Trenton, New Jersey at the Patriots Theater in the Trenton War Memorial, which has a capacity of 1,850 seats. All NEARfests were complete sellouts, outside of the 2011 cancellation.

== Status ==
In 2008, the festival celebrated its 10th anniversary with NEARfest X and marked the last event organized by Hutchinson and LaDuca until 2012. NEARfest and New Jersey ProgHouse veterans Jim Robinson, Ray Loboda and Kevin Feeley were the interim successors.

On March 25, 2011, due to insufficient ticket sales, the management announced that 2011 edition had been cancelled.

On October 13, 2011, Hutchinson and LaDuca returned to the helm and, along with Feeley, announced that NEARfest would return in 2012. Additionally, on October 17, 2011, a subsequent announcement indicated that NEARfest Apocalypse, held the weekend of June 22, 23, and 24th, 2012, would be the final edition of the festival.

== List of all performers by year ==
NEARfest Apocalypse (2012)

Day 0: Aranis, Van der Graaf Generator
Day 1: Helmet of Gnats, Twelfth Night, Änglagård, Renaissance
Day 2: Gösta Berlings Saga, Il Tempio delle Clessidre, Mike Keneally Band, U.K.

NEARfest 2011

(cancelled)

NEARfest 2010

Day 0: Riverside, Steve Hackett
Day 1: Astra, Forgas Band Phenomena, Iona, Three Friends
Day 2: Moraine, Pineapple Thief, The Enid, Eddie Jobson's Ultimate Zero Project

NEARfest 2009

Day 0: Van der Graaf Generator, Steve Hillage Band
Day 1: Cabezas de Cera, Oblivion Sun, D.F.A., Gong
Day 2: Quantum Fantay, Beardfish, Trettioåriga Kriget, PFM

NEARfest X (2008)

Day 0: Synergy, Fish
Day 1: Koenji Hyakkei, Discipline, Peter Hammill, Liquid Tension Experiment
Day 2: Mörglbl, Radio Massacre International, echolyn, Banco del Mutuo Soccorso

NEARfest 2007

Day 1: IZZ, NeBeLNeST, Bob Drake, Magenta, Hawkwind
Day 2: Indukti, La Maschera di Cera, Robert Rich, Pure Reason Revolution, Magma
Progressive Arts Preshow: Allan Holdsworth, Secret Oyster, One Shot

NEARfest 2006

Day 1: KBB, Riverside, Richard Leo Johnson, FM, Ozric Tentacles
Day 2: Guapo, Michael Manring, Ange, Niacin, Keith Emerson
Progressive Arts Preshow: Hatfield and the North, The Tony Levin Band

NEARfest 2005

Day 1: Wobbler, Frogg Cafe, Steve Roach, Present, IQ
Day 2: Knight Area, The Muffins, Matthew Parmenter, Kenso, Le Orme
Progressive Arts Preshow: PFM, Proto-Kaw

NEARfest 2004

Day 1: Yezda Urfa, Pallas, Richard Pinhas, Mike Keneally Band, Univers Zero
Day 2: Hidria Spacefolk, Metamorfosi, Sean Malone, Planet X, Strawbs
Progressive Arts Preshow: The Musical Box

NEARfest 2003

Day 1: High Wheel, Alamaailman Vasarat, Tunnels, The Flower Kings, Magma
Day 2: Sleepytime Gorilla Museum, Glass Hammer, Kraan, Änglagård, Camel
The Laser's Edge/Cuneiform Records Preshow: Miriodor, Woodenhead, IZZ

NEARfest 2002

Day 1: La Torre dell'Alchimista, Miriodor, Isildurs Bane, echolyn, Nektar
Day 2: Spaced Out, Gerard, Enchant, Caravan, Steve Hackett
The Laser's Edge/Cuneiform Records Preshow: McGill/Manring/Stevens, Doctor Nerve, Dysrhythmia

NEARfest 2001

Day 1: Birdsongs of the Mesozoic, Under the Sun, White Willow, Deus Ex Machina, Porcupine Tree
Day 2: The Underground Railroad, Djam Karet, California Guitar Trio with Tony Levin, After Crying, Banco del Mutuo Soccorso
Independent pre-show: Land of Chocolate, The Red Masque, Electric Sheepdog, Wine of Nails

NEARfest 2000

Day 1: North Star, D.F.A., Iluvatar, Anekdoten, Happy the Man
Day 2: Nexus, Thinking Plague, Il Balletto di Bronzo, Pär Lindh Project, Transatlantic
Official pre-show: echolyn, Priam

NEARfest 1999

Day 1: Alaska, Scott McGill's Hand Farm, Larry Fast, Mastermind, IQ
Day 2: Nathan Mahl, Ice Age, Crucible, Solaris, Spock's Beard

(Setlists and personnel can be found on the NEARfest Facebook page.)

== Logo ==
From 2001 to 2008, the ever-changing festival logo was designed by British artist Roger Dean, famous for his work with Yes and Asia. Starting in 2009, Mark Wilkinson (Marillion and Fish album covers) took over the logo duties for the show. For the final edition of the festival in 2012, NEARfest Apocalypse, both Roger Dean and Mark Wilkinson provided artwork. Both artists also attended the show.

Prior to Roger's and Mark's involvement, there were two other logos for the show. The NEARfest 2000 logo was designed by Paul Whitehead, who is known for his album artwork for Van der Graaf Generator, Genesis, and Italian prog-rock band Le Orme. The inaugural NEARfest logo was designed by co-founder Chad Hutchinson in 1999.

In addition to Roger Dean and Mark Wilkinson, Annie Haslam of Renaissance has attended several NEARfests to display her oil paintings. Annie was in attendance at NEARfest 2004, 2005, 2007, 2009 and 2012.

== Recordings ==
NEARfest Records was launched in 2003 to release select live performances from NEARfest. The one and only compilation DVD, "NEARfest 2005: Rising to the Surface," was released on April 10, 2007. Other releases include live CDs of Steve Hackett, Djam Karet, Nathan Mahl, Thinking Plague, Birdsongs of the Mesozoic, Glass Hammer, Steve Roach, Pure Reason Revolution (out of print) and Hidria Spacefolk (out of print). NEARfest Records officially ceased operations in January 2017.

== Live releases ==
A number of artists have officially released their NEARfest performances on CD and/or DVD. Below is a comprehensive list by festival year. Availability may vary.

NEARfest 1999

- Nathan Mahl, "Live at NEARfest 1999" (CD)
- Spock's Beard, "Live at the Whisky and NEARfest" (CD)

NEARfest 2000

- Anekdoten, "Gravity" (2CD) (Japanese version: CD1 is a studio album, CD2 contains three songs from their NEARfest performance)
- D.F.A., "Work in Progress Live" (CD)
- Nexus, "Live at NEARfest 2000" (CD)
- North Star, "Live at NEARfest 2000" (CD)
- Thinking Plague, "Upon Both Your Houses" (CD)

NEARfest 2001

- Birdsongs of the Mesozoic, "2001 Live Birds" (CD)
- Djam Karet, "Live at NEARest 2001" (CD)
- Under the Sun, "Schematism: On Stage with Under The Sun" (CD)

NEARfest 2002

- Caravan, "A Night's Tale: Live in the USA" (DVD)
- Enchant, "Tug of War" (CD) ("Below Zero" live at NEARfest 2002 is a bonus track on the special edition)
- Steve Hackett, "Live Archive: NEARfest" (2CD)
- La Torre Dell'Alchimista, "USA... You know?" (CD)
- Miriodor, "Parade + Live at NEARfest 2002" (2CD) (CD1 is a studio album, CD2 is the NEARfest performance)
- Nektar, "Live" (DVD)
- Nektar, "Greatest Hits Live" (2CD)

NEARfest 2003

- Glass Hammer, "Live at NEARfest" (CD)
- Tunnels, "Art of Living Dangerously" (CD) ("Lilly's Dolphin" and "Wall to Wall Sunshine" are from their NEARfest performance)

NEARfest 2004

- Hidria Spacefolk, "Live 11 a.m." (CD)
- Strawbs, "Live at NEARfest" (CD)
- Yezda Urfa, "Live: NEARFest 2004" (CD)

NEARfest 2005

- IQ, "Stage" (2DVD) (other DVD is a live performance from Montreal)
- Kenso, "Live in USA" (DVD)
- Le Orme, "Live in Pennsylvania" (2CD+DVD)
- Proto-Kaw, "The Wait of Glory" (CD+DVD) (CD is a studio album, DVD includes three songs from their NEARfest performance)
- NEARfest 2005: Rising to the Surface (DVD)
- Steve Roach, "Storm Surge" (CD)
- The Muffins, Baker's Dozen (2022)

NEARfest 2006

- FM, "Live at NEARfest 2006" (CD+DVD)
- Guapo, "History of Visitation" (CD+DVD) (CD is a studio album, DVD is the NEARfest performance)

NEARfest 2007

- IZZ, "Live at NEARfest" (CD)
- IZZ, "Live" (DVD) (includes other live performances)
- Pure Reason Revolution, "Live at NEARfest 2007" (CD)
- Secret Oyster, "Live in the USA 2007" (CD)

NEARfest X (2008)

- Fish, "In Search of the 13th Star: Fish Live in the USA" (DVD)

NEARfest 2009

- Cabezas de Cera, "CDC Live USA: En Vivo en el NEARfest 2009" (CD+DVD)

NEARfest 2010

- Forgas Band Phenomena, "Acte V" (CD+DVD)
- Moraine, "Metamorphic Rock" (CD)

NEARfest Apocalypse (2012)

- Il Tempio delle Clessidre, "Live in Seoul" (DVD) (part of their NEARfest performance is bonus content)
- Renaissance, "Grandine il vento" (CD) (acoustic version of "Carpet of the Sun" is a bonus track on the Japanese version)
