= Univers Zero =

Belgian band

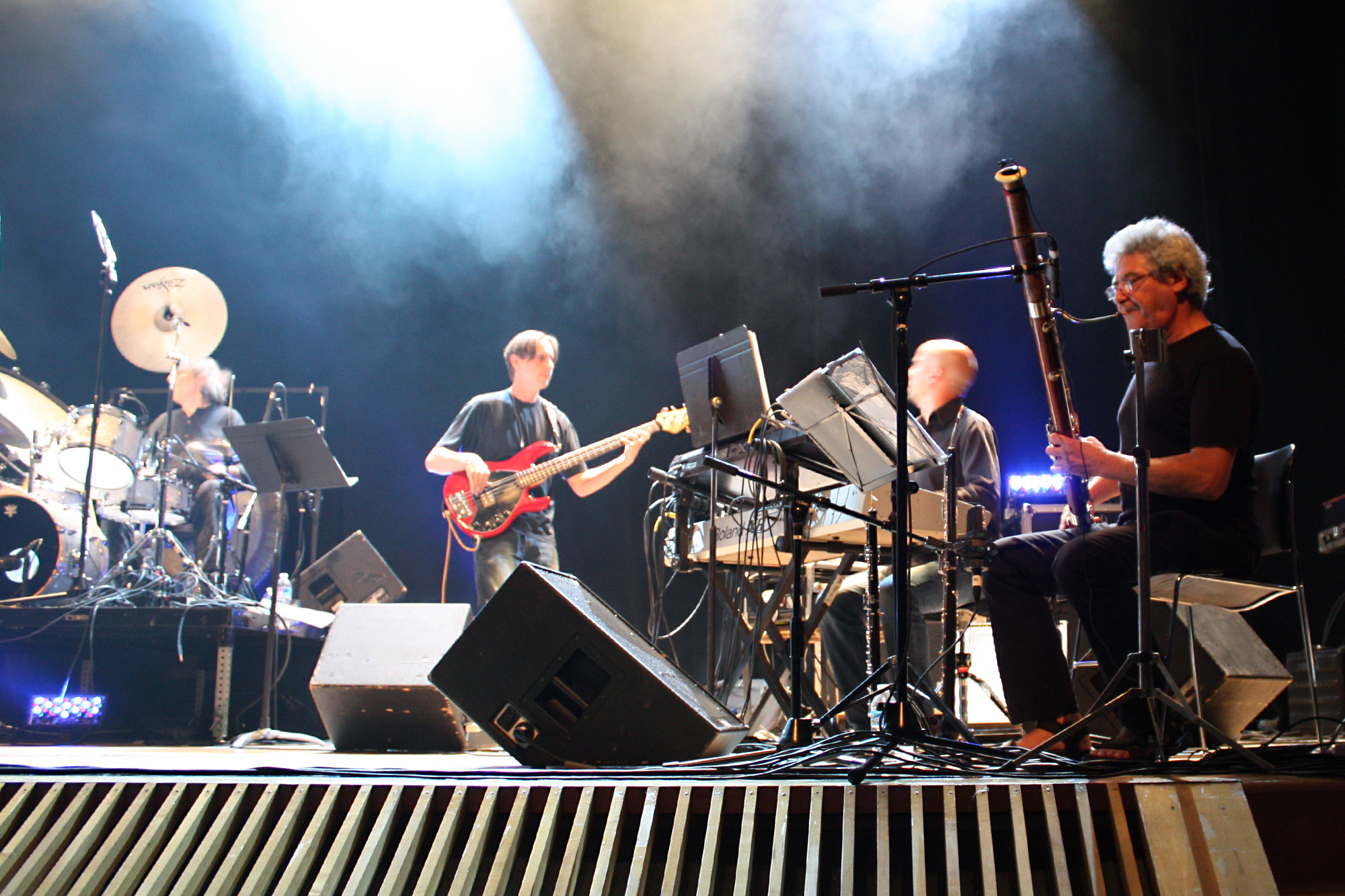
- Univers Zero in 2010 at La Maison Française

Background information
- Origin: Belgium
- Genres: Progressive rock; Rock in Opposition; zeuhl; avant-prog; instrumental; chamber music
- Years active: 1974–1987, 1999–present
- Members: (2013) Daniel Denis (drums, percussions, keyboards and writing) Dimitri Evers (electric bass, writing, arrangements and programming) Kurt Budé (clarinet, saxophone) Antoine Guenet (piano) Nicolas Dechêne (guitar)
- Website: www.univers-zero.com

Univers Zero (also known as Univers Zéro and Univers-Zero) are an instrumental Belgian band formed in 1974 by drummer Daniel Denis. The band is known for its dark style of progressive rock, heavily influenced by 20th-century chamber music.

== History ==
In 1973, Claude Deron and Daniel Denis, both former members of Belgian Zeuhl band Arkham (which had disbanded the previous year), set up a new group, Necronomicon. By that time, apart from Deron (trumpet) and Denis (drums), the group consisted of Roger Trigaux (guitar), Guy Segers (bass guitar), Patrick Hanappier (violin) and John Van Rymenant (sax), and, later, Vincent Motoulle (keyboards). At the time, Guy Denis (percussion) took part in some shows and rehearsals and Jean-Luc Manderlier (keyboards) was present only during rehearsals. Necronomicon was renamed Univers Zero (after a book by Belgian novelist Jacques Sternberg) in 1974.

For a time, Univers Zero were part of a musical movement called Rock in Opposition (RIO), which strove to create dense, challenging music, a direct contrast to the disco and punk music being produced in the late 1970s. Obvious early influences were Béla Bartók and Igor Stravinsky, but the band also cited lesser-known composers such as Albert Huybrechts, who was also Belgian.

Whereas their early albums were almost entirely acoustic, featuring oboes, spinets, harmoniums and Mellotrons, their 1980s albums tended to rely more on synthesizer and electric guitar, sounding much more electric.

In 1977, they released their first eponymous album, Univers Zero, later remixed and renamed 1313. The album shows a heavy rock and roll approach despite the fact that the instrumentation was largely acoustic. This is mostly due to the use of drums and bass guitar. Two years later the album Heresie proved to be even darker. Subsequent albums lightened the sound only slightly but became ever more electric.

Despite these changes, their overall sound remained fairly consistent.

The group disbanded in 1987 but re-formed in 1999. In the interim, drummer Daniel Denis released two solo albums and joined Art Zoyd, a similar band from France. Since 1999, Univers Zéro have released five studio albums.

In 2003, Univers Zéro had retired from live performance with Daniel Denis saying that only something like a festival would make it financially worthwhile. Coincidentally soon after, they were invited to headline the first day of NEARfest in Bethlehem, Pennsylvania in June 2004. In 2011, they joined forces with Belgian groups Present and Aranis to form a 17-member ensemble called Once Upon a Time in Belgium. They premiered at the fourth edition of the Rock in Opposition festival held in Carmaux, France in September 2011, where they performed "New York Transformations", a work composed by Kurt Budé. Once Upon a Time in Belgium and Univers Zéro appear in the documentary film Romantic Warriors II: A Progressive Music Saga About Rock in Opposition.

== Discography ==
- 1977 : 1313 (originally titled Univers Zero)
- 1979 : Heresie
- 1981 : Ceux du dehors
- 1981 : Triomphe des mouches (one-sided 7" single)
- 1983 : Crawling Wind
- 1984 : Uzed
- 1986 : Heatwave
- 1999 : The Hard Quest
- 2002 : Rhythmix
- 2004 : Implosion
- 2006 : Live (live album)
- 2008 : Relaps (Archives 1984/85/86) (live album)
- 2010 : Clivages
- 2014 : Phosphorescent Dreams
- 2023 : Lueur
