= Present (band) =

Belgian progressive rock band

- Origin: Belgium
- Genres: Avant-rock
- Years active: 1979–present
- Members: François Mignot; Dave Kerman; Pierre Chevalier; Keith Macksoud; Pierre Desassis; Matthieu Safatly; Udi Koomran; Liesbeth Lambrecht
- Past members: Alain Rochette; Daniel Denis; Christian Genet; Bruno Bernas; Guy Segers; David Davister; Reginald Trigaux; Roger Trigaux
- Website: Present homepage

Present is a Belgian progressive rock group formed by guitarist Roger Trigaux in 1979.

== Biography ==
Trigaux was a founding member of Univers Zero and participated on the first two albums. After Heresie (1979) he left Univers Zero to concentrate on his own vision and founded Present. The early lineup of Present featured fellow Univers Zero members Daniel Denis and Christian Genet playing drums and bass respectively.

Present's first album, Triskaidekiphobie, was released in 1980, and was followed by Le Poison Qui Rend Fou in 1985. The group toured Europe in support of both albums.

In 1990, Trigaux began working with his son Reginald Trigaux (also a guitarist), as a duo, using the moniker Present C.O.D. Performance. They played a stripped-down and very loud repertoire of the band’s previous compositions, plus new songs written for the duo. An eponymous record was issued early in 1993. By year's end, Denis wished to concentrate on Univers Zero, but agreed to stay with Present until a suitable replacement could be found. The American drummer Dave Kerman from the 5uu's, Thinking Plague, U-Totem, etc. was recruited. This new line-up set out on a twenty-five-date tour of Europe; the last show was recorded and released in 1995 as Present Live by Cuneiform Records in the USA.

In 1996 Present recorded their fifth album, Certitudes. As Kerman was under contract with the Dutch band Blast for the year, Denis returned for the recording. Cuneiform Records released the disc in 1998.

Keyboardist Pierre Chevalier joined the group in 1997. The following year, a New Yorker, Keith Macksoud (the group's former driver and roadie), became the bassist. This new line-up played a five-week, twenty-five-show, ten-thousand-mile tour, zigzagging across America and back during the spring of 1998. Again, the last concert was recorded for a live album, though it would be a few years before being released.

In 1998, Trigaux traveled to Tel Aviv, to play guitar for a soundtrack L.P. by the Israeli band Tractor's Revenge. The recording engineer of the project, Udi Koomran, suggested that Trigaux return to Israel with the entire band, plus percussionist David Davister, for the next recording sessions in the spring of 1999. During their two-week stay, the group recorded over 100 minutes of new music. The finished project was split up over two subsequent albums, No. 6 (1999) and High Infidelity (2000).

In 2000 the French cellist Matthieu Safatly joined Present. The band, joined by two horn players, Fred Becker and Dominic Ntoumos, were the headline act at the Blaye Les Mines Festival in Southern France, for an audience of seven thousand spectators. (Others on the bill included Toots And The Maytals, Gong and Asian Dub Foundation.) The following year, the same group played with Anekdoten and Magma at the Freakshow Festival in Wurzburg Germany and in Gdansk, Poland for a festival performance the next day.

Present's 2001 tour of North America was cancelled because of the September 11th attacks. (The band was scheduled to arrive at New York’s JFK airport late that same evening.)

In 2004, the band convened in Brussels to record the album Barbaro, ma non troppo. That year there were some sporadic concert dates, and Pierre Desassis (alto and soprano saxophones) joined the band.

In 2005, Cuneiform Records released Present’s second live album, A Great Inhumane Adventure, culled from recordings at Orion Studios during the 1998 USA tour. Also in 2005, the band again traveled to the USA, for a tour of the eastern states and Canada, which concluded with a performance at the North East Art Rock Festival (NEARfest). This concert appearance is, in part, featured on the DVD release by Nearfest Records called NEARfest 2005. In 2006 Present traveled to Portugal to perform at the Gouveia Artrock Festival.

In April 2007, the band were the curators of the first Rock In Opposition Festival France event, highlighting two separate performances: The first night was called “Present Acoustic”, as Trigaux's compositions were classically realized for two grand pianos (performed by Chevalier and Ward Devleeschhouwer), while the rest of the group played scored percussion. The following evening, Present was the final band of the festival, playing in their normal, electric rock manner. Both performances were filmed for the Barbaro, ma non troppo DVD.

Present appeared at the second Rock In Opposition Festival France event in 2009. Univers Zero also performed, after which both groups performed together. That same year ReR USA/ Ad Hoc Records released the Barbaro, ma non troppo set (the studio recordings from Brussels, 2004 + the live footage from Gouveia and both the electric and acoustic concerts from Rock In Opposition 2007 + bonus, historical films of the band). Also in 2009, cellist Matthew Safatly left the band to concentrate on a solo career.

At the 2010 installment of the Rock In Opposition Festival France event, Present and Univers Zero again performed together, adding a third Belgian group (Aranis) to the mix, bringing the total number of musicians on stage to seventeen. This large ensemble – which goes by the name Once Upon A Time In Belgium – played compositions by the main composers of each group: Trigaux, Denis, Kurt Bude and Joris Vanvinckenroye. This line-up also performed in Lyon, France the following February. The entourage was also augmented by the crew of Zeitgeist Media, who produced the 2012 feature film documentary Romantic Warriors II: A Progressive Music Saga About Rock in Opposition, of which all three groups were an integral part.

During autumn 2013, Present again convened in Brussels, this time to plan for the following year’s recording schedule, and to learn an almost entirely new concert program in only five days. Shortly afterwards, the group premiered this music at that year’s Rock In Opposition Festival France event, with new horn player Kurt Bude (from Univers Zero), and again at the Freakshow Festival in Wurzburg, Germany.

In 2014 the band performed at the Zappanale Festival in Bad Doberan, Germany, and at the first Rock In Opposition Festival in Japan. In 2015, violinist/violist Liesbeth Lambrecht joined Present. Roger Trigaux died in March, 2021 aged 69.

=== Present Acoustic ===
Present Acoustic is a "classical" variant of the band featuring grand piano, percussion and vocals. It premièred at a Rock in Opposition festival in Southern France in April 2007, where they performed as Present, their regular act, and as Present Acoustic, where they played two grand pianos and "a lot of percussion" and sang.

== Discography ==
- Triskaidekaphobie (1980)
- Le poison qui rend fou (1985)
- C.O.D Performance (1993)
- Live! (1996)
- Certitudes (1998)
- No. 6 (1999)
- High Infidelity (2001)
- A Great Inhumane Adventure (2005)
- Barbaro (ma non troppo) (2009)
- No. 6 - Remastered/ Expanded (Japan, 2014)
- High Infidelity - Remastered/ Expanded (Japan, 2014)
- Barbaro (ma non troppo) - Remastered/ Expanded (Japan, 2014)
- This is NOT the end (2024)
