= Rock in Opposition =

Former musical movement

Flyer for the 1st RIO festival, 12 March 1978, The New London Theatre, London. The ticket below the flyer reads: "FIVE ROCK GROUPS THE RECORD COMPANIES DON'T WANT YOU TO HEAR." (Note: The text of the ticket below the flyer varies depending on source of the picture. On the Stormy Six homepage it clearly says "FIVE ROCK GROUPS THE RECORD COMPANIES DON'T WANT YOU TO HEAR.", whereas at SquidCo the ticket is not legible and a bubble (incorrectly?) says "THE ROCK SHOWS THE RECORD COMPANIES DON'T WANT YOU TO HEAR.")

Rock in Opposition or RIO was a movement representing a collective of progressive rock bands in the late 1970s united in their opposition to the music industry that refused to recognise their music. It was initiated by English avant-prog group Henry Cow in March 1978 when they invited four mainland European groups to come to London and perform in a festival called "Rock in Opposition".

== History ==
Henry Cow spent most of their last five years touring mainland Europe. There they encountered many innovative groups who were virtually unknown outside their own countries. What Henry Cow had in common with these groups was that record companies were not interested in their music. Henry Cow's contract with Virgin Records was cancelled when Virgin realised the band were not profitable.

In early 1978, Nick Hobbs, Henry Cow's manager at the time, decided to expose some of these European groups to British audiences and invited them to tour the United Kingdom with Henry Cow under the banner "Rock in Opposition". With the help of a £1000 grant from the British Arts Council, Hobbs organised a Rock in Opposition festival in London with the slogan: "The music the record companies don't want you to hear". The event took place on 12 March 1978 at the New London Theatre with the following groups performing:

- Henry Cow (England)
- Stormy Six (Italy)
- Samla Mammas Manna (Sweden)
- Univers Zero (Belgium)
- Etron Fou Leloublan (France)

The tour of the UK never materialised, but the festival did generate "a lot of press around the world", and this prompted the five bands to discuss future plans. While "Rock in Opposition" was never intended to be a formal organisation, they met at Sunrise Studio in Kirchberg, Switzerland in December 1978 to reconstitute the movement as a collective. By this time Henry Cow no longer existed as a group, but as RIO's prime mover its former members still actively participated.

RIO's primary aim was to represent and promote its members. It was decided that membership should remain closed and small, although new members would be welcome provided they (i) adhered to "musical excellence" (as evaluated by the collective); (ii) worked actively "outside the music business"; and (iii) had a "social commitment to Rock". Using these criteria, three new members were elected:

- Art Zoyd (France)
- Art Bears (England, made up of former Henry Cow members)
- Aksak Maboul (Belgium)

A second RIO festival, organised by Stormy Six, took place between 26 April and 1 May 1979 at al Teatro dell'Elfo in Milan, Italy where all seven groups performed, the original four (minus Henry Cow) plus the three new groups. During the festival, the RIO members met formally again to discuss the way forward. However, despite some constructive discussion, disagreements arose between the groups regarding RIO's role and matters were left unresolved. Two further RIO festivals took place in Sweden and Belgium, but no new meetings, and by the end of 1979, RIO as an organisation had "quietly slipped away".

=== Recommended Records ===
Poster for the 2nd RIO festival in Milan, Italy, between 26 April and 1 May 1979.

Towards the end of 1978, Chris Cutler from Henry Cow and Art Bears and one of the active participants in RIO, had established Recommended Records (RēR), an independent record label and distribution network for RIO and similar artists. When RIO folded as an organisation, RēR continued RIO's work by representing and promoting marginalised musicians and groups. RēR became a "virtual" RIO, and "... is part of the continuing legacy of RIO".

=== RIO as a genre ===
RIO became a minor category or genre after it ceased being an organisation at the end of 1979. While the term "RIO" was never used to refer to a particular style of music during the organisation's existence (the original RIO bands were quite diverse musically), it became used by listeners, musicians, and distributors as a means of classifying a particular subset of avant-garde artists. Avant-prog (short for avant-garde progressive rock) is a style that appeared in the late 1970s as the extension of two separate prog rock sub-styles: RIO and the Canterbury scene.

== "Reunions" ==
A "reunion" festival took place at the Maison de la Musique de Cap Découverte in Carmaux, France in April 2007. The spirit of the original festival was preserved in that only artists of quality, innovation and the willingness to be "in opposition" to the commercial music industry performed. The festival was organised by French music promoter Michel Besset and Roger Trigaux of Present, who received Chris Cutler's sanction to use the name "Rock in Opposition". The line-up at this event included: Magma, Faust, the Peter Blegvad Trio (including Chris Cutler), Present, Zao, Mats/Morgan, Guapo, NeBeLNeST, Salle Gaveau and GMEA.

A second edition of the France RIO event took place in September 2009 at the same venue as the first, and with the following line-up: Yolk, Aranis, The Muffins, Charles Hayward, Kōenji Hyakkei, Present, Magma, Univers Zero, Combat Astronomy, Electric Epic, Guapo and GMEA. The third "reunion" festival also took place at the same venue in September 2010, and featured Art Bears Songbook (UK, USA), Gong (France, UK), Caspar Brötzmann Massaker (Germany), Sleepytime Gorilla Museum (USA), Rational Diet (Belarus), Jannick Top/Infernal Machina (France), Thierry Zaboitzeff (ex Art Zoyd) "Cross the Bridge" (France, Austria), Full Blast (Germany, Switzerland), Miriodor (Canada), Genevieve Foccroulle (Belgique) and Aquaserge (France).

The fourth edition of the France RIO also took place in September 2011, with a line-up of: Arno, Univers Zero + Present + Aranis ("Once Upon a Time in Belgium"), Alamaailman Vasarat, Vialka, Yugen, Gargantua, Panzerballett, Jack Dupon, Grumpf Quartet, Sax Ruins vs. Ruins Alone vs. Ono Ryoko, and Dispositivoperilanciobliquodiunasferetta. The 2011 event was covered in the 2012 documentary film Romantic Warriors II: A Progressive Music Saga About Rock in Opposition by Adele Schmidt and José Zegarra Holder.

Two RIO festivals took place in 2014, the seventh French event in Carmaux in September, and a Japanese edition of the festival in Tokyo in November. The line-up for the Japanese event was: Aranis (Belgium), The Artaud Beats (UK), Happy Family (Japan), Koenji Hyakkei (Japan), Mats/Morgan Band (Sweden), Picchio dal Pozzo (Italy), Richard Pinhas (France), Present (Belgium), Le Silo (Japan), SOLA / Lars Holmer's Global Home Project (Sweden/Japan). Cutler, who features in The Artaud Beats, said of RIO Japan: "[RIO] is changed of course; back then it was a musician-led exercise in self-sufficiency fighting for new musical forms and independence from the institutions; now it is recast as a celebration of those times and those bands, and of the music they inspired. [...] Which, I suppose, is the way it should be. RIO ceased to be ours long ago; now it's yours. Take care with it."

The 10th Rock in Opposition festival took place in Carmaux, France on 15, 16, 17 September 2017, and featured Aranis (Belgium), Cheer-Accident (US), faUSt (Germany), Le Silo (Japan), Miriodor (Canada), Trans-aeolian Transmission (France), Gong (France), Acid Mothers Temple (Japan), a.P.A.t.T. (England), In Love With (France), Guapo (England) and Slapp Happy (Germany/England).

== Documentaries ==
- Romantic Warriors II: A Progressive Music Saga About Rock in Opposition (2012) – a 98-minute documentary by Adele Schmidt and José Zegarra Holder.

== Works cited ==
- Piekut, Benjamin (2019). Henry Cow: The World Is a Problem. Duke University Press. ISBN 978-1-47800-405-9.
