= Taproot discography =

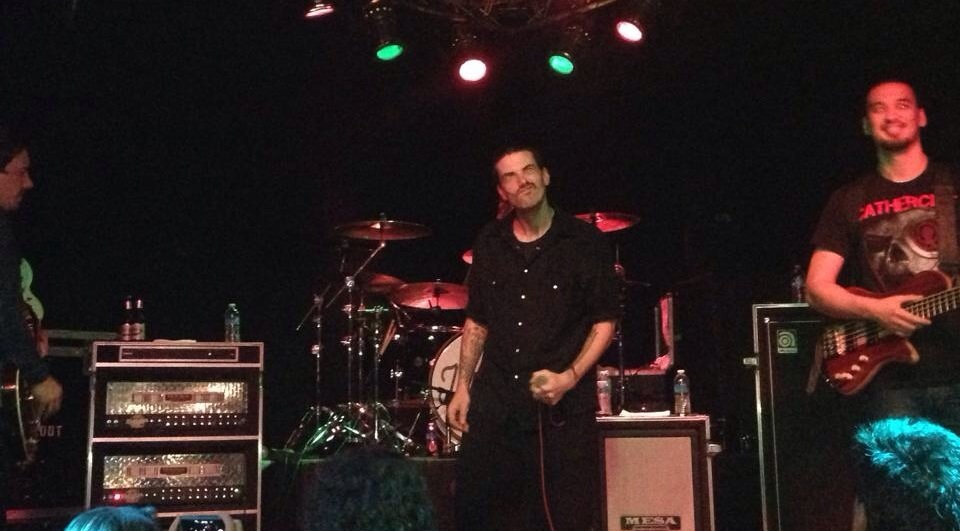
- Taproot in 2013
- Studio albums: 7
- Extended plays: 1
- Demo albums: 2
- Compilation albums: 2
- Singles: 12
- Music videos: 8

The discography of Taproot, an American alternative metal band, consists of seven studio albums, two demo albums, one EP, twelve singles, and eight music videos.

== Albums ==
=== Studio albums ===
List of studio albums, with selected chart positions
Title	Album details	Peak chart positions				
Title	Album details	US	US Hard Rock	US Rock	JPN	UK
Gift	Released: June 27, 2000 (US); Label: Atlantic, Velvet Hammer; Formats: CD, cassette, digital download	160	—	—	—	198
Welcome	Released: October 15, 2002 (US); Label: Atlantic, Velvet Hammer; Formats: CD, digital download	17	—	—	210	104
Blue-Sky Research	Released: August 16, 2005 (US); Label: Atlantic, Velvet Hammer; Formats: CD, digital download	33	—	—	—	186
Our Long Road Home	Released: September 16, 2008 (US); Label: Velvet Hammer; Formats: CD, digital download	65	14	20	—	—
Plead the Fifth	Released: May 11, 2010 (US); Label: Victory; Formats: CD, digital download	107	12	42	—	—
The Episodes	Released: April 10, 2012 (US); Label: Victory; Formats: CD, digital download	156	21	—	—	—
SC\SSRS	Released: September 29, 2023 (US); Label: THC MUSIC/Amplified Distribution; Formats: CD, digital download	—	—	—	—	—
"—" denotes a recording that did not chart or was not released in that territory.

=== Demo albums ===
List of independent releases, with selected chart positions
Title	Album details	Peak chart positions				
Title	Album details	US	US Hard Rock	US Rock	JPN	UK
...Something More Than Nothing	Released: 1998 (US); Label: Pimp Ass; Formats: CD	—	—	—	—	—
Upon Us	Released: 1999 (US); Label: Taproot; Formats: CD	—	—	—	—	—

=== Compilation albums ===
List of compilation albums, with selected chart positions
Title	Album details	Peak chart positions				
Title	Album details	US	US Hard Rock	US Rock	JPN	UK
Besides	Released: 2018; Label: Self-released; Formats: 8xCD	—	—	—	—	—
Best of Besides	Released: 2023; Label: THC Music; Formats: CD	—	—	—	—	—
"—" denotes a recording that did not chart or was not released in that territory.

== Extended plays ==
List of extended plays, with selected chart positions
Title	Album details	Peak chart positions				
Title	Album details	US	US Hard Rock	US Rock	JPN	UK
Mentobe	Released: 1998 (US); Label: Pimp Ass; Formats: CD	—	—	—	—	—
"—" denotes a recording that did not chart or was not released in that territory.

== Singles ==
List of singles, with selected chart positions
Title	Year	Peak chart positions					Album
Title	Year	US Bub.	US Alt.	US Main. Rock	US Rock	UK	Album
"Again & Again"	2000	—	—	39	—	95	Gift
"I"	2001	—	—	34	—	—	Gift
"Poem"	2002	6	10	5	—	92	Welcome
"Mine"	2003	—	26	23	—	92	Welcome
"Calling"	2005	—	23	11	—	—	Blue-Sky Research
"Birthday"	2005	—	—	39	—	—	Blue-Sky Research
"Wherever I Stand"	2008	—	—	34	—	—	Our Long Road Home
"Path Less Taken"	2009	—	—	—	—	—	Our Long Road Home
"Fractured (Everything I Said Was True)"	2010	—	—	18	49	—	Plead the Fifth
"Release Me"	2010	—	—	—	—	—	Plead the Fifth
"No Surrender"	2012	—	—	38	—	—	The Episodes
"The Everlasting"	2012	—	—	—	—	—	The Episodes
"V\CT\M \ PLAY"	2023	—	—	—	—	—	SC\SSRS
"No One Else to Blame"	2023	—	—	—	—	—	SC\SSRS
"Favourite Song"	2023	—	—	—	—	—	SC\SSRS
"—" denotes a recording that did not chart or was not released in that territory.

== Guest appearances ==
List of non-single guest appearances, showing year released and album name
Title	Year	Album
"Day by Day"	2000	Dracula 2000 soundtrack
"Mirror's Reflection" (live)	2001	Ozzfest: Second Stage Live
"P5hng Me A*wy" (Mike Shinoda Reanimation) [feat. Stephen Richards]	2002	Reanimation (Linkin Park album)
"Myself" (live)	2004	Music as a Weapon II
"Sumtimes" (live)	2004	Music as a Weapon II
"Poem" (live)	2004	Music as a Weapon II

== Music videos ==
List of music videos, showing year released, director, and album
Title	Year	Director(s)	Album
"Again & Again"	2000	Shawn Foster	Gift
"Poem"	2002	The Brothers Strause	Welcome
"Mine"	2003	Shavo Odadjian	Welcome
"Calling"	2005	Moh Azima	Blue-Sky Research
"Fractured (Everything I Said Was True)"	2010	Eric Richter	Plead The Fifth
"Release Me"	2010	Eric Richter	Plead The Fifth
"No Surrender"	2012	Eric Richter	The Episodes
"The Everlasting"	2012	Eric Richter	The Episodes
"Favourite Song"	2023	Thom Hazaert	SC/SSRS
