= Plead the Fifth (album) =

Studio album by Taproot
- Released: May 11, 2010
- Studio: The Loft (Saline, Michigan); Tazmania Studios (Ann Arbor, Michigan)
- Genre: Alternative metal; nu metal
- Length: 40:12
- Label: Victory
- Producer: Tim Patalan

Taproot chronology
Our Long Road Home (2008)	Plead the Fifth (2010)	The Episodes (2012)

Singles from Plead the Fifth
- 1. "Fractured (Everything I Said Was True)" Released: February 16, 2010; 2. "Release Me" Released: September 14, 2010

Plead the Fifth is the fifth studio album by American alternative metal band Taproot. Originally planned for an April 13, 2010 release, it was delayed to May 11. The album marks Taproot's first release through Victory Records, having signed in November 2009. "Fractured (Everything I Said Was True)" was released as the lead single, followed by "Release Me". The confirmed track listing was released on the Victory Records website.

Guitarist Mike DeWolf described the album's sound as a return to the heavy nature of Taproot's early material:

"We're definitely making it as heavy as possible and aggressive while still keeping a lot of the beautiful melodies and just the general beauty of things in it. We're using a lot more of our baritone guitars, which was sort of the signature of the Gift and Welcome [2002] years, so that immediately makes things a lot heavier."

The album debuted at number 107 on the Billboard 200 chart, with first week sales of 5,500.

== Critical reception ==
Professional ratings
Review scores
Source	Rating
About.com	2.5/5 stars
AbsolutePunk	(78%)
AllMusic	2.5/5 stars
Thrash Hits	5/6 stars

Tim Grierson of About.com felt the band's return to a more straightforward sound was a misstep that resulted in tracks sounding too alike to each other, despite Stephen Richards remaining a vocal presence behind tracks like "No View Is True" and "Release Me". Corey Hoffy of AbsolutePunk said that despite not coming close to Blue-Sky Research, he commended the band for returning to their heavier roots from their earlier work while maintaining a modicum of melodies, concluding that "Overall, I was impressed with the musical approach and the vocal approach the band took. The downfall (of us all?) though lies in its lack of creativity and typical lyrics. Even with all of its faults though, the band seems to be having more fun than ever, and it's easy to tell that after five studio releases, this band is finally going to go places." AllMusic's Stephen Thomas Erlewine said of the record, "It’s a bunch of twists and turns in search of a song, and if Taproot doesn’t necessarily find melodic through-lines, they nevertheless know how to construct vehicles for their flair, which is darker and heavier than it has been in some time – and that may be enough to please the hardcore who have been dismayed by the band’s ambition of late."

== Track listing ==
All tracks are written by Taproot (Stephen Richards, Mike DeWolf, Phil Lipscomb, and Nick Fredell).

No.	Title	Length
1.	"Now Rise"	3:26
2.	"Game Over"	3:29
3.	"Fractured (Everything I Said Was True)"	3:16
4.	"Release Me"	4:33
5.	"Stolage"	3:38
6.	"911ost"	3:07
7.	"Trophy WiFi"	3:49
8.	"Words Don't Mean a Thing"	3:28
9.	"Left Behind"	3:42
10.	"No View Is True"	3:38
11.	"Stares"	4:11
Total length:		40:12

== Personnel ==
Taproot

- Stephen Richards – vocals, guitar, programming, engineer
- Mike DeWolf – guitar, art direction, layout
- Phil Lipscomb – bass
- Nick Fredell – drums

Additional

- Dick Richards – additional vocals (track 4)
- Tim Patalan – producer, engineer, mixing
- Andy Patalan – mixing, mastering
- Double J – art direction, layout
- Glenn Thomas (We Are Synapse) – cover, design
- Roxanne Hartridge – cover photography
- Mirak Habbiyyieh – band photography

== Charts ==
Singles - Billboard (United States)

Year	Single	Chart	Position
2010	"Fractured (Everything I Said Was True)"	Mainstream Rock Tracks	18
