= Fractured (Everything I Said Was True) =

Single by Taproot

from the album Plead the Fifth
- Released: February 16, 2010
- Recorded: Saline, Michigan
- Genre: Alternative metal; nu metal
- Length: 3:16
- Label: Victory
- Songwriters: Mike DeWolf, Stephen Richards, Phil Lipscomb, Nick Fredell
- Producer: Tim Patalan

Taproot singles chronology
"Path Less Taken" (2009)	"Fractured (Everything I Said Was True)" (2010)	"Release Me" (2010)

Music video
- "Fractured (Everything I Said Was True)" on YouTube

"Fractured (Everything I Said Was True)" is the lead single from Taproot's fifth studio album Plead the Fifth. It is the band's first single released through Victory Records.

This is the band's first song to chart within the top 20 of the Mainstream Rock Tracks chart since 2005's "Calling" from Blue-Sky Research.

== Music video ==
The song's music video was directed by Eric Richter and was released on June 22, 2010.

== Charts ==
Chart (2010)	Peak position
US Mainstream Rock	18
US Rock Songs	49

== Personnel ==
- Stephen Richards – vocals
- Mike DeWolf – guitar
- Phil Lipscomb – bass
- Nick Fredell – drums
