= Broken Toy =

Broken Toy or variants may refer to:

== Film and TV ==
- The Broken Toy, 1915 short with Violet Mersereau
- Broken Toys (1935 film), 1935 Disney animation short by Ben Sharpsteen
- Toote Khilone (Broken Toys), 1954 Indian film directed by Nanabhai Bhatt
- Juguetes rotos (Broken Toys), 1966 Spanish film by Manuel Summers

== Music ==
- Broken Toys!, Orpheum Theatre (Manhattan) 1981
- Broken Toy Records Samantha Ronson
- The Broken Toys (band), David Virgin
- Broken Toys Studios, Brisbane, where Powderfinger (EP) was recorded
- Broken Toys, album by Smoove & Turrell 2014
- "Broken Toy", track by Keane from Under the Iron Sea
- "Broken Toy", song by Floater from Wake
- "Broken Toy", song by SNFU from ...And No One Else Wanted to Play
- "Broken Toy", song by Azalia Snail from Soft Bloom 1999
- "Broken Toy", song by The First Class 1980
- "Broken Toys", Korean song by Epik High from Remapping the Human Soul 2007
- "Broken Toy", song by Sophie Ellis-Bextor from Hana 2023
