= Burnt Sienna =

Burnt Sienna may refer to:

- Burnt sienna, an earth pigment
- Burnt Sienna (album), a 1992 album by Azalia Snail
- "Burnt Sienna" (song), a 1993 song by Margaret Urlich
