= How to Live With a Tiger =

Studio album by Hail/Snail
- Released: 1993
- Recorded: Spring 1993
- Studio: Waterworks (New York City, NY)
- Genre: Psychedelic folk
- Length: 35:48
- Label: Funky Mushroom
- Producer: Susanne Lewis, Azalia Snail

Hail/Snail chronology
Burnt Sienna (1992)	How to Live With a Tiger (1993)	Fumarole Rising (1994)

How to Live With a Tiger is a studio album by Hail/Snail, released in 1993 by Funky Mushroom Records. It is a collaborative effort by musicians Susanne Lewis and Azalia Snail.

== Track listing ==
No.	Title	Writer(s)	Length
1.	"Tigerture"	Robert Arnde	1:04
2.	"Savannah"	Azalia Snail	3:52
3.	"Firewheel"	Susanne Lewis	4:34
4.	"Retribution"	Azalia Snail	2:27
5.	"Shoe/Shoe Missing"	Susanne Lewis	3:16
6.	"Little People in the Forest"	Susanne Lewis	3:50
7.	"Shazam"	Susanne Lewis	2:20
8.	"Hot Ice"	Azalia Snail	3:26
9.	"Dust Gather on Me"	Susanne Lewis	3:42
10.	"Whirly-Bird"	Azalia Snail	3:13
11.	"Frosted Flakes"	Azalia Snail	4:04

== Personnel ==
Adapted from How to Live With a Tiger liner notes.

Musicians

- Susanne Lewis – vocals, guitar, bass guitar, keyboards, violin, drums, cymbals, production
- Azalia Snail – vocals, guitar, slide guitar, harmonica, keyboards, xylophone, cymbals, triangle, production

Additional musicians

- Robert Arnde – spoken word (1)
- Mike Burns – drums (2, 4, 8)
- Herbert Burt – vocals and bass guitar (11)
- Barry Chabala – flute, didgeridoo and piccolo (2, 8, 10)
- Eva Gaborchestra – strings (10)
- Gary Olson – trumpet and bugle (5, 11)
- Greg Talenfeld – keyboards (5)

Production and additional personnel

- Greg Talenfeld – engineering, mixing

== Release history ==
Region	Date	Label	Format	Catalog
United States	1993	Funky Mushroom	CD	FM-025
United States	1998	Sedimental	CD	SEDCD025
