= Birthday (Taproot song) =

Single by Taproot

from the album Blue-Sky Research
- Released: 2005
- Genre: Post-grunge; nu metal
- Length: 4:29
- Label: Atlantic; Velvet Hammer
- Songwriter(s): Jarrod Montague; Mike DeWolf; Philip Lipscomb; Stephen Richards; Bob Marlette
- Producer(s): Toby Wright

Taproot singles chronology
"Calling" (2005)	"Birthday" (2005)	"Wherever I Stand" (2008)

Birthday is the second and final single from Taproot's third album, Blue-Sky Research. The song is the band's last to be released through Atlantic Records following poor album sales. "Birthday" was co-written by music producer Bob Marlette.

== Track listing ==
No.	Title	Length
1.	"Birthday"	4:29
2.	"Birthday" (radio edit)	4:02

The radio edit of the song omits the heavy section of the bridge and the screamed vocals.

== Chart positions ==
Chart (2005)	Peak position
US Mainstream Rock (Billboard)	39

== Personnel ==
- Mike DeWolf – guitar
- Philip Lipscomb – bass
- Jarrod Montague – drums
- Stephen Richards – vocals, guitar
