= Action Ornaments =

Studio album by Trumans Water
- Released: June 1997
- Genre: Indie rock
- Label: Runt

Trumans Water chronology
The Peel Sessions (1995)	Action Ornaments (1997)	Apistogramma (1998)

Professional ratings
Review scores
Source	Rating
San Diego Union-Tribune	3.5/5 stars

Action Ornaments is a 1997 album by Trumans Water, released by the Runt Records label. It features guest appearances by Azalia Snail (on tracks 4 and 8) and Chan Marshall (on track 12).

== Track listing ==
1. "3 Straps Nose to Rear" 3:29
2. "4 Story Friend" 4:15
3. "A Hurting Helping" 2:58
4. "Mood Strain" 1:50
5. "Angels Spit Stars" 1:21
6. "Skeeter Dope" 3:16
7. "Gold Plated Pissin Troff" 4:33
8. "Mutual Blood Tied Force" 3:51
9. "Curl Up to Yer Empty Years" 1:56
10. "Restore Restore and Destroy" 2:58
11. "Flying in a Coin Operated Universe" 4:20
12. "Shoe Lace or Else" 2:19
13. "Care Sliced Lies" 9:08
