= Gina Arnold =

American author, and music critic

- Born: Regina A. Arnold; Palo Alto, CA
- Education: Stanford University; University of California, Berkeley; University of California, Los Angeles
- Occupations: Author; Academic
- Writing career
- Years active: 1981–present
- Subject: Music
- Notable works: 33⅓ Exile in Guyville; Half A Million Strong: Crowds and Power from Woodstock to Coachella
- Notable awards: National Arts Journalism Fellowship (Columbia University/Pew Organization)

Gina Arnold is an American author, music critic, and academic. A lecturer at Stanford University and an adjunct professor at the University of San Francisco, she is the author of four books, including the 33⅓ book on Liz Phair, Exile in Guyville.

Between 1981 and 2003, Arnold contributed to publications including Spin, Entertainment Weekly, the Los Angeles Times, Rolling Stone, and the Village Voice. Additionally, she wrote columns for the East Bay Express, Metro Silicon Valley and the San Jose Metro. Written in the first person, her work was frequently controversial. "In the ten years that Gina Arnold wrote for this paper, no one received more hate mail," the East Bay Express wrote in 2003.

== Early life and education ==
Arnold grew up in Palo Alto, California. She attended the University of California, Berkeley, where she competed as a springboard diver on the university's swim team. She graduated with a degree in communications.

In 2011, Arnold was awarded a Ph.D. in modern thought and literature at Stanford University. Her doctoral dissertation, "Rock Crowds and Power: Race, Space, and Representation," drew on historical archives, literature, and films about counter cultural rock festivals of the 1960s and 1970s in addition to her own experience covering rock festivals in the 1990s.

== Career ==
Arnold began writing about music as a college student. At UCLA she wrote for the Daily Bruin and at Berkeley she wrote for The Daily Californian. Following her graduation, she was hired as a stringer by the Palo Alto Times Tribune and the San Jose Mercury News. She later covered music for the Los Angeles Times, as well as several other daily papers. Arnold wrote regularly on alternative music and indie rock for Spin and Entertainment Weekly.

Her weekly column "Fools Rush In" debuted in the East Bay Express in 1991 and ran through 2001. From 1996 through 2002, she wrote a column for the Metro Silicon Valley named after The Replacements album All Shook Down. With commentary that included the assertions that The Rolling Stones were “ugly, lecherous and old” and that “the Replacements have influenced current music much more than the Stones have,” Arnold's columns often strove to be contentious. In 2000, SF Weekly columnist Dan Strachota wrote that "Arnold's writing usually contains three main items: fuzzy data, oversimplification, and half-assed reasoning," stating that her interest in music ended in 1994, coinciding with Kurt Cobain's suicide."

In 1993, her book Route 666: On the Road to Nirvana was published by Bloomsbury Press; in 1997, St. Martin's Press published Kiss This: Punk In The Present Tense. Both books were controversial, and Kiss This received negative reviews, with Publishers Weekly writing that when her "informal, personal style" was "applied to larger topics about the cultural relevance of punk, for instance, Arnold's careless prose grows tedious. If not for Arnold's access to such famous rockers as Billie Joe Armstrong of Green Day, Eddie Vedder of Pearl Jam and Brett Gurewitz of Bad Religion, her book would be overwhelmed by her incoherent, self-contradictory arguments for and against contemporary punk."

In 1999, Arnold held a journalism fellowship at the Columbia University Graduate School of Journalism. Although she continued to write about music for periodicals through the early 2000s, Arnold subsequently focused on her academic career.

Arnold's Exile in Guyville was published in 2014. It was described as "an engaging and enlightening example of criticism in the post-critical age" by The Rumpus. In The Believer, Greil Marcus wrote: "Arnold is a wonderful writer: fearless, precise, full of doubt, never taking anything for granted." The New York Times described it as "charming and brave and unexpectedly moving."

Half A Million Strong: Crowds and Power from Woodstock to Coachella was published by University of Iowa Press in November 2018. Based on her Stanford dissertation, the book explores the history of large music festivals and examines their impact on American culture.

== In popular culture ==
"Aroma of Gina Arnold" is the opening track of Trumans Water album Spasm Smash XXXOXOX Ox & Ass. Revolver Distribution's 1995 catalog and zine, Gym Teacher, featured a parody of "Fools Rush In", entitled "Cruel's Just In" by "Gianna Arnaud".

== Personal life ==
Arnold is a competitive platform and springboard diver, and placed 7th in the Master's World Championships in 2014. She has one daughter.

== Bibliography ==
- joint ed. with George McKay. The Oxford Handbook of Punk Rock. Oxford University Press. May 6, 2025. doi.org/10.1093/oxfordhb/9780190859565.001.0001
- Half A Million Strong: Crowds and Power from Woodstock to Coachella, University of Iowa Press, November 15, 2018, ISBN 978-1609386085
- Exile In Guyville, Continuum/Bloomsbury Press, May 1, 2014, ISBN 9781441162571
- Kiss This: Punk in the Present Tense, St. Martin's Press, June 1, 1997, ISBN 0312155212
- Route 666: On the Road To Nirvana, St. Martin's Press/Picador UK, September 1, 1993, ISBN 9780312093761
