= Travel On, Rider =

Studio album by Scrawl
- Released: August 20, 1996
- Genre: Rock
- Length: 40:32
- Label: Elektra
- Producer: Steve Albini; Jeff Powell

Scrawl chronology
Velvet Hammer (1993)	Travel On, Rider (1996)	Nature Film (1998)

Travel On, Rider is the fifth studio album by American rock band Scrawl, released on August 20, 1996. It was the band's major-label debut, on Elektra Records. It was produced by Steve Albini and Jeff Powell. As of August 1998, the album has sold 2,115 copies in the United States, according to Nielsen SoundScan.

== Critical reception ==
Professional ratings
Review scores
Source	Rating
AllMusic	3.5/5 stars
The Boston Phoenix	3.5/4 stars
Christgau's Consumer Guide	(1-star Honorable Mention)
The Encyclopedia of Popular Music	3/5 stars
Rolling Stone	3/5 stars

In a favorable review, Gina Arnold wrote that "although Travel On, Rider...is by far the best album of [Scrawl's] career, it is also the band's most difficult." She also described the album as "the Ladies to the [Afghan] Whigs' 1993 tour de force Gentlemen. Andy Kellman of AllMusic wrote, "Without sacrificing the band's rough edges, Steve Albini's and Jeff Powell's recording and engineering give the band it's [sic] most polished sound yet, but it doesn't make their songs -- still bitter, still pessimistic, still sad -- suffer for it."

== Track listing ==
1. "Good Under Pressure" – 3:39
2. "The Garden Path" – 3:11
3. "I'm Not Stuck" – 4:23
4. "From Deep Inside Her" – 2:49
5. "Story Musgrave" – 4:46
6. "Easy on Her Mind" – 2:46
7. "Hunting Me Down" – 2:27
8. "Louis L'Amour" – 3:12
9. "Come Back Then" – 2:49
10. "He Cleaned Up" – 3:09
11. "Story Musgrave (At the Piano)" – 3:39
12. "What Did We Give Away?" – 3:46
