= Fumarole Rising =

Studio album by Azalia Snail
- Released: 1994
- Recorded: Azalia's home and Waterworks (New York City, NY)
- Genre: Psychedelic folk
- Length: 49:10
- Label: Funky Mushroom
- Producer: Azalia Snail

Azalia Snail chronology
| How to Live With a Tiger (1993) | Fumarole Rising (1994) | Escape Maker (1995) |

Professional ratings
Review scores
| Source | Rating |
|---|---|
| Allmusic | 4/5 stars |

Fumarole Rising is the third studio album by Azalia Snail, released in 1994 by Funky Mushroom Records.

== Track listing ==
All tracks are written by Azalia Snail.

| No. | Title | Length |
|---|---|---|
| 1. | "Into Yr. World" | 2:58 |
| 2. | "Cast Away (The Saga of Jeannie Berlin)" | 3:00 |
| 3. | "Please Don't Come (Here)" | 3:54 |
| 4. | "You Belong to You" | 2:48 |
| 5. | "Misfortunately" | 3:36 |
| 6. | "Sour Cherry" | 2:46 |
| 7. | "Hidden Addendum" | 3:42 |
| 8. | "Having an Experience" | 5:06 |
| 9. | "Cuckoo Clock" | 3:38 |
| 10. | "The Deep Fell Need" | 2:19 |
| 11. | "Solace Nemesis" | 3:30 |
| 12. | "Dilema Nation" | 3:40 |
| 13. | "Fumarole/Fumarole Rising" | 3:27 |
| 14. | "Fumarole Rising" | 4:42 |

== Personnel ==
Adapted from Fumarole Rising liner notes.

- Azalia Snail – vocals, guitar, keyboards, percussion, production, recording

Musicians

- John S. Hall – vocals (8)
- Susanne Lewis – violin (13)
- Andrew Nelson – drums, kalimba, percussion
- Nzomo – pocket trumpet and saxophone (1)
- Gary Olson – trumpet (4, 13)

Production and additional personnel

- Mike Burns – recording
- C. Running Sky – design
- Andrew Nelson – photography
- Carrie Schultz – art direction
- Greg Talenfeld – mixing, programming, recording (4), bass guitar (2)

== Release history ==
| Region | Date | Label | Format | Catalog |
|---|---|---|---|---|
| United States | 1994 | Funky Mushroom | CD, LP | FM-032 |
