= Milktrain to Paydirt =

Studio album by Trumans Water
- Released: August 1995
- Label: Homestead

Trumans Water chronology
Godspeed the Vortex (1994)	Milktrain to Paydirt (1995)	The Peel Sessions (1995)

Professional ratings
Review scores
Source	Rating
Allmusic	3/5 stars
Chicago Tribune	3/5 stars

Milktrain to Paydirt is an album by Trumans Water. It was released in August 1995 by Homestead Records. It was their first studio album without Glen Galloway (who had left to form Soul-Junk), and their first album with Kevin Cascell on drums. It was also their last release on the Homestead label. The song "Off-Peak Arson" features Thurston Moore on guitar. Trouser Press described the album: "The herky-jerky rhythms of "Unitraction Bath" and "Mnemonic Elf Lock" pack a particularly potent post-Fall punch, but that's not always enough to offset the self-congratulatory quirkiness that seems so ingrained in the band's approach".

== Track listing ==
1. Mechanical Days Safety System - (3:37)
2. Unitraction Bath - (3:12)
3. Lick Observatory - (5:11)
4. Spectro Helio Scope - (3:47)
5. Stares from New Enemies - (0:53)
6. Vexation Fruits - (0:35)
7. Sour Synapse/St. Job Int'l Gore - (9:38)
8. Concussed - (5:37)
9. American Fat - (2:28)
10. Irly Traitor Consent - (3:15)
11. Mnemonic Elf Lock - (1:04)
12. Siskiyou Armiger - (2:08)
13. Asleep Sneeze - (1:26)
14. Off Peak Arson - (5:36)
15. Wind and Rain Over Wings - (5:55)
