= Celestial Respect =

Studio album by Azalia Snail
- Released: June 28, 2011
- Genre: Psychedelic folk
- Length: 39:51
- Label: Silber
- Producer: Azalia Snail

Azalia Snail chronology
Avec amour (2005)	Celestial Respect (2011)

Professional ratings
Review scores
Source	Rating
Allmusic	4/5 stars

Celestial Respect is the eleven studio album by Azalia Snail, released on June 28, 2011 by Silber Records.

== Track listing ==
All tracks are written by Azalia Snail.

No.	Title	Length
1.	"Solar Riser"	4:02
2.	"Celestial"	0:31
3.	"Space Heater"	5:08
4.	"Extra Celestial"	0:40
5.	"User System"	4:35
6.	"Gtr Godz"	0:59
7.	"Burnt Cookies"	3:14
8.	"Rescue Toy"	2:57
9.	"Star Driver"	0:40
10.	"Loveydove"	3:23
11.	"Fallen Down"	2:12
12.	"Savings Time"	5:36
13.	"Respecter"	0:48
14.	"Death Gets in the Way"	5:06

== Personnel ==
Adapted from Celestial Respect liner notes.

- Azalia Snail – vocals, instruments, production

== Release history ==
Region	Date	Label	Format	Catalog
United States	2011	Silber	CD	silber093
