= SC\SSRS =

Studio album by Taproot
- Released: September 29, 2023
- Recorded: 2017–2023
- Studio: The Loft (Saline, Michigan)
- Genre: Alternative metal; nu metal
- Length: 41:00
- Label: THC; Amplified
- Producer: Stephen Richards

Taproot chronology
Best of Besides (2023)	SC\SSRS (2023)

Singles from SC\SSRS
- 1. "VIP (V\CT\M \ PLAY)" Released: May 7, 2023; 2. "No One Else to Blame" Released: August 8, 2023; 3. "Favourite Song" Released: September 11, 2023

Professional ratings
Review scores
Source	Rating
Blabbermouth.net	8/10
Cryptic Rock	4/5

SC\SSRS is the seventh studio album by American alternative metal band Taproot, released through THC Music and Amplified Distribution on September 29, 2023. It is the band's first studio album in eleven years, since 2012's The Episodes.

Produced and recorded entirely by frontman Stephen Richards, the album was originally planned to be released under the Taproot name, before Richards decided to pursue it as a solo effort. Bandmate Phil Lipscomb convinced Richards to put it out as a Taproot album, and the band decided to reunite. They embarked on a tour in support of the record, recruiting new guitarist Taylor Roberts. The tour also marks the return of original drummer, Jarrod Montague, who last played with Taproot in 2008 (besides occasional guest appearances). In 2023 interviews, Richards stated that his health issues were a reason for the extended period of inactivity for the band, which led to a delayed release of the album. According to Richards, most of the album's songs were written in 2013.

== Track listing ==
All tracks are written by Stephen Richards.

No.	Title	Length
1.	"VIP (V\CT\M \ PLAY)"	4:24
2.	"Favourite Song" (featuring Elias Soriano)	3:35
3.	"We Control Our Destiny"	3:05
4.	"No One Else to Blame"	4:41
5.	"Scared Together"	3:06
6.	"Imagining"	2:59
7.	"2nd Thought"	3:58
8.	"Love Without You" (featuring Audrey Ray)	4:36
9.	"The Best Things in Life"	3:47
10.	"Ma"	4:02
11.	"Hey" (bonus track, unlisted on CD edition)	3:27

== Personnel ==
Recording

- Stephen Richards
- Elias Soriano – guest vocals on "Favourite Song"
- Audrey Ray – guest vocals on "Love Without You"

Production

- Matt LaPlant – mixing
- Tim Patalan – engineering

Live musicians

- Stephen Richards – lead vocals, rhythm guitar
- Taylor Roberts – lead guitar
- Phil Lipscomb – bass, backing vocals
- Jarrod Montague – drums
