= Blue Danube (album) =

Studio album by Azalia Snail
- Released: 1995
- Genre: Psychedelic folk
- Length: 44:35
- Label: Normal
- Producer: Azalia Snail

Azalia Snail chronology
Escape Maker (1995)	Blue Danube (1995)	Deep Motif (1996)

Blue Danube is the fifth studio album by Azalia Snail, released in 1995 by Normal Records.

== Track listing ==
All tracks are written by Azalia Snail.

No.	Title	Length
1.	"Blue Danube"	5:21
2.	"King of Everything"	2:40
3.	"Baby Apricot"	3:00
4.	"Illusory Hangout"	1:48
5.	"Slow Propulsion"	5:21
6.	"Song at Siesta Time"	3:51
7.	"Escape Maker"	3:20
8.	"Vitriolic Feeling"	2:28
9.	"Unaligned Sky"	3:25
10.	"Poison Decree"	3:37
11.	"Persuasion"	5:09
12.	"Evidence"	2:28
13.	"The Adult Sea"	2:07

== Personnel ==
Adapted from Blue Danube liner notes.

- Azalia Snail – vocals, guitar, percussion, production

Musicians

- Matt Chip – bass guitar (10)
- Pall Jenkins – bass guitar (10)
- Gary Olson – trumpet (10)
- Mike Burns – drums and engineering (9)

Production and additional personnel

- Bridget Shields – photography
- Bill Wells – engineering

== Release history ==
Region	Date	Label	Format	Catalog
United States	1995	Normal	CD	NORMAL 197
