= Of Thick Tum =

Studio album by Trumans Water
- Released: 1992
- Genre: Noise rock
- Label: Justice My Eye

Trumans Water chronology
Of Thick Tum (1992)	Spasm Smash XXXOXOX Ox & Ass (1993)

Professional ratings
Review scores
Source	Rating
AllMusic	4/5 stars

Of Thick Tum is the first album by Trumans Water. BBC disc jockey John Peel heard this album and was so impressed by it that he played it in its entirety on his show. The band initially self-released a small pressing (300 copies) of this album on vinyl in 1992, with each copy in a handmade and unique jacket with inserts varying from locks of hair to photographs of their relatives. In his review of the follow-up, Spasm Smash XXXOXOX Ox & Ass in Melody Maker, Everett True stated that his copy had included "a Far Side birthday card, the foreword to a book on setting up private hospital rooms, an advice sheet on insurance, some small intestines, and a cloth sleeve which is too small for the LP to fit inside". The album was re-released in the United States by Homestead Records on CD and LP. Subsequent British and Japanese issues of the album contained considerable (and different) bonus material.

== Track listing ==
Original 1992 US release

1. "Deep Grub Yonder" - 4:27
2. "665" - 2:19
3. "Yakboy=Nurturer" - 9:37
4. "Nick Long Ding Barn" - 1:05
5. "Tooth Ferry" - 3:09
6. "Disindependence" - 3:31
7. "Well Nigh Dusk" - 1:17
8. "Wings Spred Wide I Thot 'Ignition'" - 3:09
9. "Janellopy" 3:27
10. "Spurning of Angel Peg" - 3:15
11. "Sorry About the Blood" - 1:02
12. "Fong" - 3:07
13. "Girler Too" - 5:04

1993 UK Rough Trade re-issue bonus tracks

1. "Secret Bloodthirst" - 14:19
2. "Large Organs" - 3:01
3. "Johnny Pissoff & the Red Angel Meets" (Fugs cover) - 5:00
4. "Yakboy=Enabler (Alternate Mix") - 3:27

Track listing notes: "Yakboy=Enabler" is not an alternate mix of the album version of "Yakboy=Nurturer"; it is an entirely different recording of the first section of the song.

1994 Japanese King Records re-issue bonus tracks

1. "Ordnance (Cont'd)" - 21:09
2. "Apolotix" - 3:32
3. "Mind Yer Altar" - 0:25
4. "Another Movement" - 1:41
5. "Sad Sailor Story" - 5:07

Track listing notes: "Ordnance (Cont'd)" is from (and all of) Side 2 of the vinyl-only LP, Godspeed the Hemorrhage (1993). (Side 1 of this album was included in bonus tracks of the concurrent Japanese re-issue of the Godspeed the Punchline album.) The remaining bonus tracks are from Our Scars Like Badges, the first Trumans Water seven-inch EP (Homestead Records, 1992).
