= Wherever I Stand =

Single by Taproot

from the album Our Long Road Home
- Released: November 17, 2008
- Recorded: 2008 at The Loft in Saline, Michigan
- Genre: Alternative rock; post-grunge
- Length: 3:26
- Label: Velvet Hammer
- Songwriters: Mike DeWolf, Stephen Richards, Phil Lipscomb, Jarrod Montague
- Producer: Tim Palatan

Taproot singles chronology
"Birthday" (2005)	"Wherever I Stand" (2008)	"Path Less Taken" (2009)

Music video
- "Wherever I Stand" on YouTube

"Wherever I Stand" is the first single from Taproot's fourth album Our Long Road Home. This is the band's first single not to be released through Atlantic Records.

== Music video ==
The song's video begins with a man and his girlfriend sitting down on a couch. They start talking, which eventually leads to an argument between the two. The woman changes clothes before leaving her boyfriend's apartment. The man then thinks back to all the good times the two had, such as spending a day at a lake. The man soon heads out after his girlfriend before he finds her standing next to the lake from earlier.

== Track listing ==
1. "Wherever I Stand" – 3:26

== Charts ==
Chart (2008)	Peak position
US Mainstream Rock Tracks	34
