= Fragments of a Lucky Break =

Studio album by Trumans Water
- Released: August 1998
- Recorded: 1997, Herbert House Studios
- Genre: Indie rock
- Label: Emperor Jones
- Producer: Greg Paul

Trumans Water chronology
Apistogramma (1997)	Fragments of a Lucky Break (1998)	Trumans Water (2001)

Professional ratings
Review scores
Source	Rating
AllMusic	3/5 stars
The Encyclopedia of Popular Music	3/5 stars
NME	(favorable)

Fragments of a Lucky Break is a 1998 album by Trumans Water. The CD was released on the Emperor Jones label and the vinyl was released on the Infinite Chug label. It was their first album in several years to include Glen Galloway, who left the band in 1994 to form Soul-Junk.

== Critical reception ==
AllMusic's Stephen Cramer called the album "some of [the band's] most inspired and cohesive work." Portland Mercury deemed it a "modern classic," writing that it approaches "the raw materials of guitar rock with a cubist’s perspective, creating subtly complex structures full of impossible angles and complex formulas that miraculously balance out every time."

== Track listing ==
1. "Obstacle of Habit" - 4:04
2. "Lyrical Nozzle" - 2:39
3. "Strat-As-Fear" - 2:09
4. "Wealth In a Flask" - 5:53
5. "Sky Landslide" - 3:36
6. "Your Courage" - 4:34
7. "Woed World Whirlers" - 2:27
8. "Tiny World With the Jitters" - 4:16
9. "Mall Removal Machine" - 3:39
10. "60 Seconds Over Medium" - 4:58
11. "Worth of Wait" - 2:23
12. "Matter Smasher" - 0:06
13. "Water for a Thirsty City" - 3:54
14. "Someday You'll Be King" (MX-80 Sound cover) - 3:24
15. "All Eye And Movement" - 4:15
