= Godspeed the Punchline =

Studio album by Trumans Water
- Released: January 1994
- Recorded: 1993
- Genre: Indie rock
- Label: Homestead

Trumans Water chronology
Spasm Smash XXXOXOX Ox & Ass (1993)	Godspeed the Punchline (1994)	Godspeed the Static (1994)

Professional ratings
Review scores
Source	Rating
Allmusic	3/5 stars
Washington Post	(favorable)

Godspeed the Punchline is an album by Trumans Water. It was released in January 1994 by Homestead Records in the United States and Elemental Records in the UK. This album was preceded by three other "Godspeed" albums--Godspeed the Static, Godspeed the Vortex and Godspeed the Hemorrhage—all of which featured improvised, lo-fi music. Godspeed the Punchline can probably be considered the proper, studio follow-up to Spasm Smash XXXOXOX Ox & Ass. It is the last studio album recorded with Glen Galloway before he left to form Soul-Junk. The album was described as "eighteen short blasts of negasonic tumult" by David Sprague of Trouser Press, while Mark Jenkins of The Washington Post stated that the songs "can wander aimlessly or suddenly turn on the siren and race straight to their destination".

== Track listing ==
1. "Destroy 1998" - 0:41
2. "Long End of a Firearm" - 4:47
3. "All Wet West of Washington" - 2:29
4. "Hair Junk Fibre" - 1:22
5. "Ungalaxy" - 0:38
6. "Antsmashes Yer Star (Dead Airwaves)" - 3:48
7. "Enflamed" - 3:40
8. "Outpatient Lightspeed" - 2:56
9. "Infinity Times Zero" - 0:13
10. "Sucker Mystique" - 2:10
11. Playboy Stabtone Bloodbath Go" - 2:38
12. "Slander in New Slang" - 2:33
13. "No Big (Wave) Star" - 2:37
14. "Theme of Blast" - 0:34
15. "Fuller Piston Vinegar" - 3:35
16. "22" - 2:33
17. "Horsesense" - 1:54
18. "Spaceship Next Door" - 1:18
