= You Are in the Line of Fire and They Are Shooting at You =

You are in the Line of Fire and they are Shooting at You

Studio album by Trumans Water
- Released: 2003
- Genre: Indie rock
- Label: Homesleep

Trumans Water chronology
| Trumans Water (2001) | You are in the Line of Fire and they are Shooting at You (2003) | The Singles 1992-1997 (2003) |

Professional ratings
Review scores
| Source | Rating |
|---|---|
| Rock Sound | 5/10 stars |
| UNCUT | 3/5 stars |
| The Wire | (favorable) |

You are in the line of fire and they are shooting at you is a 2003 album by Trumans Water, released on the Homesleep label.

== Track listing ==
1. "Rock of Gibraltar" 2:51
2. "Some Things Feel Rough" 1:51
3. "Fire vs. Ice" 2:03
4. "Neither Created Nor Destroyed" 3:02
5. "Say Hi to the Lie Machine" 3:31
6. "Pry Stag Mile" 2:30
7. "Pulverizer Bear" 2:58
8. "The Joys of Resistance" 2:33
9. "Meteorites for Troglodytes" 3:30
10. "Magnetism and Good Credit" 1:47
11. "Pony Dress" [Flesheaters cover] 2:33
12. "Trapeze Sharks" 3:04
13. "Airs Smudgy Blanket" 3:14
14. "The Spirit is a Stomach" 2:42
15. "When Diet and Exercise Fail" 5:55
16. "Cherry Wants Change" 6:27
