= 10 x My Age =

EP by Trumans Water
- Released: 1993
- Genre: Rock
- Length: 17:42
- Label: Elemental Records

Trumans Water chronology
Hey Fish (1993)	10 x My Age (1993)	Skyjacker (1994)

10 x My Age is a 1993 EP by Trumans Water, released by Elemental Records. It was released as a CD and as a 10" record pressed on white vinyl.

== Track listing ==
No.	Title	Length
1.	"Empty Queen II"	3:40
2.	"Second Bass Drum"	2:15
3.	"Enflamed"	2:41
4.	"Paid Squat"	1:33
5.	"Parabolic"	3:31
6.	"Action Sound Deadman"	4:02

Track listing notes: "Action Sound Deadman" ends at 3:14 and, after about four seconds of silence, is followed by an unlisted, 44-second excerpt of a Glen Galloway/Soul-Junk demo. Bandmembers at the time of the release of 10 x My Age stated in interviews that this was a mastering mistake and not a "bonus track".

The versions of "Empty Queen II" and "Enflamed" on this release are the same as those included on "Hey Fish" and "Godspeed the Punchline", respectively.
