= Apistogramma (album) =

Studio album by Trumans Water
- Released: April 1998
- Genre: Indie rock
- Label: Justice My Eye

Trumans Water chronology
Action Ornaments (1997)	Apistogramma (1998)	Fragments of a Lucky Break (1998)

Apistogramma is a 1998 Trumans Water album released by Justice My Eye/Elevated Loin. It features a cover of the Sun Ra song: Rocket #9. Ron Paulos plays sax on #4, #5, and #7.

== Track listing ==
1. I've Been Here Before Though I Don't Remember It (9:50)
2. Skrimshaw Skalps (4:18)
3. Family Style (3:52)
4. Blistered And Soft (6:05)
5. Cy30-Cy308 (3:29)
6. The End Is A Cinch To See Even Behynd Me (4:01)
7. Rocket #9 (2:32)
8. Minus Time Space Plus Soul Time (1:55)
9. Prune The Laggards (3:33)
10. Ballad Of Finn McCool (2:36)
11. Slum Summer (3:43)
