= Mine (Taproot song) =

Single by Taproot

from the album Welcome
- Released: March 3, 2003
- Recorded: November 2001 – May 2002 in Los Angeles, California
- Genre: Nu metal
- Length: 3:49
- Label: Atlantic/Velvet Hammer
- Songwriters: Mike DeWolf, Stephen Richards, Phil Lipscomb, Jarrod Montague
- Producer: Toby Wright

Taproot singles chronology
"Poem" (2002)	"Mine" (2003)	"Calling" (2005)

Music video
- "Mine" on YouTube

"Mine" is the second and final single from Taproot's second studio album Welcome. Along with "Poem", the song is one of the band's most successful singles. A music video was released for the song and was directed by System of a Down bassist Shavo Odadjian.

== Track listing ==
No.	Title	Length
1.	"Mine" (album version)	3:49
2.	"Poem" (live at BBC Radio 1's Maida Vale Studio)	3:01
3.	"Mine" (music video)	3:50

== Charts ==
Chart (2003)	Peak position
UK Singles (OCC)	92
UK Rock & Metal (OCC)	15
US Modern Rock Tracks (Billboard)	26
US Mainstream Rock Tracks (Billboard)	23

== Personnel ==
- Mike DeWolf – guitar
- Phil Lipscomb – bass
- Jarrod Montague – drums
- Stephen Richards – vocals, guitar
