= Avec Amour (Azalia Snail album) =

Avec amour

Studio album by Azalia Snail
- Released: 2005
- Genre: Psychedelic folk
- Length: 51:31
- Label: True Classical
- Producer: Azalia Snail

Azalia Snail chronology
Brazen Arrows (2001)	Avec amour (2005)	Celestial Respect (2011)

Professional ratings
Review scores
Source	Rating
Allmusic	3/5 stars

Avec amour is the tenth studio album by Azalia Snail, released in 2005 by True Classical.

== Track listing ==
All tracks are written by Azalia Snail, except "I Feel Love" by Pete Bellotte, Giorgio Moroder and Donna Summer.

No.	Title	Length
1.	"Honeysuckle"	4:31
2.	"Alcazar"	4:02
3.	"Scenescape"	4:09
4.	"Luxury RD"	3:40
5.	"I Praise You"	6:33
6.	"Casuarina Trees"	3:52
7.	"Sylvan Echoes"	3:34
8.	"Late for the Life"	4:35
9.	"Mint Stallion"	2:35
10.	"Disintegration"	7:17
11.	"I Feel Love"	6:43

== Personnel ==
Adapted from Avec Amour liner notes.

- Azalia Snail – vocals, guitar, keyboards, percussion, illustrations, art direction

Musicians

- Tanya Haden – cello
- Gary Ramon – guitar, bass guitar, drums, percussion, engineering

Production and additional personnel

- Dave Cooley – mastering
- Dan Monick – photography

== Release history ==
Region	Date	Label	Format	Catalog
United States	2005	True Classical	CD	TCCD 027
