= Our Long Road Home =

Studio album by Taproot
- Released: September 16, 2008
- Recorded: 2008
- Studio: The Loft (Saline, Michigan)
- Genre: Post-grunge; alternative metal
- Length: 41:26
- Label: Velvet Hammer
- Producer: Tim Patalan

Taproot chronology
Blue-Sky Research (2005)	Our Long Road Home (2008)	Plead the Fifth (2010)

Singles from Our Long Road Home
- 1. "Wherever I Stand" Released: November 17, 2008; 2. "Path Less Taken" Released: 2009

Our Long Road Home is the fourth studio album by the American alternative metal band Taproot. It was issued on September 16, 2008, and is Taproot's first independent release since 1999's Upon Us. The album was published through Velvet Hammer. It is the band's first collaboration with producer Tim Patalan, after working with Toby Wright on their two previous studio releases. It was the final album to feature original drummer Jarrod Montague, whose departure was announced a week after the record's release. Montague would rejoin the band in 2023. Our Long Road Home's lead single is "Wherever I Stand".

== Production ==
"Budget cuts and political shifts", according to Taproot vocalist Stephen Richards, cost them their label support with Atlantic. This led the band to "try doing something different" and release Our Long Road Home independently. The album was recorded at the Loft, a barn converted into a recording studio in Saline, Michigan. Richards, living ten minutes away from the studio, considered this convenient due to various band members now having families and wanting to stay close to them. He noted, "For the first time, instead of being thousands of miles away and being forced to be creative, we were at home, inspired by the things we know and love."

The band has noted the mixed fan reception toward the progressive sound of Our Long Road Home. In March 2010, when discussing their upcoming album Plead the Fifth, guitarist Mike DeWolf stated:

"I think it threw a lot of fans for a loop. But at the time, we were willing to lose some people to gain some more. In general, I guess ... I don't know. But we're definitely getting back to it. I think a lot of people appreciated the progressive nature of what we were trying to do but at the same time, a lot of people are just fucking meatheads and only want heaviness. I guess some bands are pretty good at sticking to one thing and working that their entire career. Say ... AC/DC. But that wasn't us."

== Critical reception ==
Professional ratings
Review scores
Source	Rating
About.com	3/5 stars
Seattle Post-Intelligencer	(mixed)

Tim Grierson from About.com called the album "a consistently tuneful collection", praising the different styles of 1990s rock the band adopts for songs that contain autobiographical lyrics about their experience with the music industry, which Grierson considered as being "compelling stuff". He concluded that "[A]s its title suggests, Our Long Road Home captures a band that once was lost but is now finding its way at last." A writer for the Seattle Post-Intelligencer felt the record was scattershot, with the track listing going back and forth between "melodic hard rock the band made its bones on and something more akin to boring, sappy Christian rock". The review concludes with: "There are a few strong moments, to be sure ("The Path Less Taken", "Take It" and "You're Not Home Tonight"), but most of the songs offer more of the same old riffs and post-grunge sentiments of failed relationships." Mark Keresman of AllMusic noted how the band took "a more melodic, radio-friendly approach" to their sound while retaining their unique genre style, concluding that "Fans of Taproot's earlier discs may be a little confused, but Our Long Road Home finds them heading towards an identity all their own."

== Track listing ==
No.	Title	Length
1.	"Path Less Taken"	3:55
2.	"Wherever I Stand"	3:23
3.	"Be the 1"	3:21
4.	"Hand That Holds True"	3:41
5.	"Take It"	3:12
6.	"It's Natural" (feat. Kristin von Burthal)	3:39
7.	"As One"	3:50
8.	"You're Not Home Tonight"	2:57
9.	"Stethoscope"	1:43
10.	"Run To"	3:40
11.	"Karmaway"	4:09
12.	"Footprints"	3:51

Bonus tracks
No.	Title	Length
1.	"These Walls" (iTunes release)	2:45
2.	"Wake Up" (Amazon release)	3:59

== Personnel ==
Taproot

- Stephen Richards – vocals, guitar
- Mike DeWolf – guitar, design
- Phil Lipscomb – bass, design
- Jarrod Montague – drums

Additional

- Kristen von Burthal – additional vocals (track 6)
- Tim Patalan – producer, engineer
- Brian Malouf – mixing
- Howie Weinberg – mastering
- Brian Porizek – design
- Lucas Pereira – cover photo
- Chris Casella – back cover

== Charts ==
Singles – Billboard (North America)

Year	Single	Chart	Position
2008	"Wherever I Stand"	Mainstream Rock Tracks	#34
