= Hail (indie band) =

American band

- Origin: United States
- Genres: Indie rock Alternative rock Experimental; Electronica
- Years active: 1980s–present
- Label: Recommended Records
- Members: Susanne Lewis, Bob Drake
- Past members: Bill Gilonis, Dave Kerman, Chris Cutler

Hail are an American indie/punk band with an avant-garde twist consisting of Susanne Lewis (vocals, guitar, main composer and lyricist) and Bob Drake (bass). The band has also had guest appearances from Mike Johnson, Dave Kerman, Chris Cutler and Bill Gilonis.

== Discography ==
Albums include Gypsy Cat & Gypsy Bird (1988), Turn of the Screw (1990) and Kirk (1992). In 2006, Lewis and Drake released a new Hail album, Hello Debris, on Recommended Records.

Lewis also collaborated with Azalia Snail under the name "Hail/Snail" for the album How to Live With a Tiger (1993), and she guested alongside Cutler on Biota's album Object Holder (1995).
