= Breaker Mortar =

Studio album by Azalia Snail
- Released: 1997
- Genre: Psychedelic folk
- Length: 60:16
- Label: Dark Beloved Cloud
- Producer: Azalia Snail

Azalia Snail chronology
Deep Motif (1996)	Breaker Mortar (1997)	Soft Bloom (1999)

Breaker Mortar is the seventh studio album by Azalia Snail, released in 1997 by Dark Beloved Cloud.

== Track listing ==
All tracks are written by Azalia Snail.

No.	Title	Length
1.	"Getting Lei'd"	3:28
2.	"Servant of Smoke"	2:43
3.	"Consult the Map"	3:50
4.	"Savara Veneto"	3:38
5.	"In a Moon Suit"	5:02
6.	"Ginger Ale"	2:45
7.	"Gilt Vatrine"	2:18
8.	"Storm Corff"	2:55
9.	"Statis Que"	2:46
10.	"Gathering Harbingers"	1:22
11.	"Defeo's Death by Rose"	3:53
12.	"I Hold It Close"	3:14
13.	"Are You Going To?"	1:25
14.	"Perhaps"	0:48
15.	"Having an Experiment/I Am Not a Guard"	6:13
16.	"Taking Over"	8:15
17.	"The Snail-Made Man" (Part 1)	2:08
18.	"The Snail-Made Man" (Part 2)	2:04
19.	"The Snail-Made Man" (Part 3)	0:54
20.	"The Snail-Made Man" (Part 4)	0:35

== Personnel ==
Adapted from Breaker Mortar liner notes.

- Azalia Snail – vocals, instruments, production

== Release history ==
Region	Date	Label	Format	Catalog
United States	1997	Dark Beloved Cloud	CD	dbc 209
