= Brazen Arrows =

Studio album by Azalia Snail
- Released: 2001
- Genre: Psychedelic folk
- Length: 69:37
- Label: Dark Beloved Cloud
- Producer: Azalia Snail

Azalia Snail chronology
Soft Bloom (1999)	Brazen Arrows (2001)	Avec Amour (2005)

Brazen Arrows is the ninth studio album by Azalia Snail, released in 2001 by Dark Beloved Cloud.

== Track listing ==
All tracks are written by Azalia Snail.

No.	Title	Length
1.	"Let Me Enslave You"	7:15
2.	"Fall All the Way"	5:11
3.	"If He Wins"	7:44
4.	"Brazen Arrow"	4:45
5.	"Usher My Presume"	5:21
6.	"Making It"	7:07
7.	"A Heavy Leaf Falls Silent"	4:52
8.	"Cushions"	3:14
9.	"The Arraignment"	5:59
10.	"The Sain't Ain't"	13:52
11.	"Gilded Carousel"	0:28
12.	"[untitled]"	3:49

== Personnel ==
Adapted from Brazen Arrows liner notes.

- Azalia Snail – vocals, instruments, production

== Release history ==
Region	Date	Label	Format	Catalog
United States	2001	Dark Beloved Cloud	CD	dbc 231
