= I (Taproot song) =

2001 Taproot song

Single by Taproot

from the album Gift
- Released: 2001
- Genre: Nu metal
- Length: 4:14
- Label: Atlantic/Velvet Hammer
- Songwriters: Mike DeWolf, Stephen Richards, Phil Lipscomb, Jarrod Montague
- Producers: Ulrich Wild, David Benveniste

Taproot singles chronology
"Again & Again" (2000)	"I" (2001)	"Poem" (2002)

"I" is the second and final single from Taproot's album Gift. The song is one of the most melodic tracks from the album. "I" was the most successful single from the album, charting at no. 34 on the Mainstream Rock Chart.

== Track listing ==
No.	Title	Length
1.	"I"	4:14
2.	"I" (radio edit)	3:54

== Chart positions ==
Chart (2001)	Peak position
US Mainstream Rock (Billboard)	34

== Personnel ==
- Stephen Richards – vocals
- Mike DeWolf – guitar
- Phil Lipscomb – bass
- Jarrod Montague – drums
