= Again & Again (Taproot song) =

2000 song by Taproot

Single by Taproot

from the album Gift
- Released: November 30, 2000
- Recorded: January – March 2000
- Studio: Master Control Recording in Burbank, California
- Genre: Nu metal
- Length: 3:58
- Label: Atlantic/Velvet Hammer
- Songwriters: Mike DeWolf, Stephen Richards, Phil Lipscomb, Jarrod Montague
- Producers: Ulrich Wild; David Benveniste

Taproot singles chronology
"Again & Again" (2000)	"I" (2001)

Music video
- "Again & Again" on YouTube

"Again & Again" is the debut single by American alternative metal band Taproot. The song was released from the band's major label debut, Gift, and reached No. 39 on the Mainstream Rock chart.

== Overview ==
A demo version of the song appears on the album Upon Us.

"Again & Again" was a minor success for the band, charting on the US Main. Rock Chart and UK Singles Chart.

The single's b-side, "Day by Day", appeared on the album Dracula 2000: Music from the Motion Picture.

== Music video ==
The song's music video shows the band performing the song in a building, while fans watch the performance on a TV screen.

== Track listing ==
American single
No.	Title	Length
1.	"Again & Again"	3:58
2.	"Mirror's Reflection"	3:11
3.	"Dragged Down"	3:31

European single
No.	Title	Length
1.	"Again & Again" (Clean Album Version)	3:58
2.	"Day by Day" (Non LP Bonus Track)	3:20
3.	"Smile" (Clean Album Version)	3:33

== Chart positions ==
Chart (2000–2001)	Peak position
Scotland (OCC)	84
UK Singles (OCC)	95
UK Rock & Metal (OCC)	6
US Mainstream Rock Tracks (Billboard)	39

== Personnel ==
- Stephen Richards – vocals, programming
- Mike DeWolf – guitar
- Phil Lipscomb – bass
- Jarrod Montague – drums
