= Escape Maker =

Studio album by Azalia Snail
- Released: 1995
- Genre: Psychedelic folk
- Label: Garden of Delights
- Producer: Azalia Snail

Azalia Snail chronology
Fumarole Rising (1994)	Escape Maker (1995)	Blue Danube (1996)

Escape Maker is the fourth studio album by Azalia Snail, released in 1995 by Garden of Delights.

== Track listing ==
All tracks are written by Azalia Snail.

Side one
No.	Title	Length
1.	"Escape Maker"
2.	"Baby Apricot"
3.	"Persuation"
4.	"Fetter Intrigue"
5.	"Briefly"
6.	"Slow Propulsion"

Side two
No.	Title	Length
1.	"Affair at Styles"
2.	"Lost Prize"
3.	"To Last"
4.	"Hit of the Day"
5.	"Go Ahead & Ask"
6.	"Hero Gold"
7.	"Reflect Or Die"

== Personnel ==
Adapted from Escape Maker liner notes.

- Azalia Snail – vocals, guitar, xylophone, production, recording

== Release history ==
Region	Date	Label	Format	Catalog
United Kingdom	1995	Garden of Delights	LP	Garden 5
