= Deep Motif =

Studio album by Azalia Snail
- Released: 1996
- Genre: Psychedelic folk
- Length: 49:40
- Label: Candy Floss
- Producer: Azalia Snail

Azalia Snail chronology
Blue Danube (1995)	Deep Motif (1996)	Breaker Mortar (1997)

Professional ratings
Review scores
Source	Rating
Allmusic	3/5 stars

Deep Motif is the sixth studio album by Azalia Snail, released in 1996 by Candy Floss.

== Track listing ==
All tracks are written by Azalia Snail, except "Satellite of Love" by Lou Reed.

No.	Title	Length
1.	"Aero Sets Me Free"	3:12
2.	"Headstart"	5:18
3.	"Key Witness"	5:21
4.	"Stoked Like a Furnace"	2:13
5.	"Circumspection"	5:45
6.	"Baby Apricot"	3:53
7.	"Lost Prize"	3:15
8.	"To Last"	1:27
9.	"Satellite of Love" (Lou Reed cover)	2:54
10.	"The Supposing Song"	5:44
11.	"Highway Devices"	10:38

== Personnel ==
Adapted from Deep Motif liner notes.

- Azalia Snail – vocals, guitar, production

== Release history ==
Region	Date	Label	Format	Catalog
United States	1996	Candy Floss	CD, LP	CF-013
