= Snailbait (album) =

Studio album by Azalia Snail
- Released: 1990
- Recorded: 1989
- Genre: Psychedelic folk
- Length: 65:42
- Label: Albertine

Azalia Snail chronology
| Snailbait (1990) | Burnt Sienna (1992) |

Professional ratings
Review scores
| Source | Rating |
|---|---|
| Allmusic | 3/5 stars |

Snailbait is the debut album of Azalia Snail, released in 1990 by Albertine Records.

== Track listing ==
All tracks are written by Azalia Snail.

| No. | Title | Length |
|---|---|---|
| 1. | "Azalia Bloom No. 16" | 4:17 |
| 2. | "Another Slave Labour Day" | 3:15 |
| 3. | "Nothing & Everywhere" | 2:39 |
| 4. | "Flight No. 520" | 3:44 |
| 5. | "Lovelessland" | 2:00 |
| 6. | "Your Loss for My Gain" | 3:18 |
| 7. | "Hiss & Crackle (Direktos Sonnenlicht Epilogue)" | 4:37 |
| 8. | "Anywhere Is Here" | 3:22 |
| 9. | "If I Had It All, I'd Give It All to You" | 3:42 |
| 10. | "Driftless" | 4:20 |
| 11. | "Sun in Your Face" | 2:27 |
| 12. | "Baby Brother" | 2:21 |
| 13. | "Far & Away" | 2:42 |
| 14. | "So Much More to Go" | 22:58 |

== Personnel ==
Adapted from Snailbait liner notes.

- Azalia Snail – vocals, guitar, cabasa, kalimba, zither

Musicians

- John S. Hall – vocals (12)
- Richard Hutchins – bells, bongos, chimes, gong, woodblock
- Heather Meredith – flute
- Andy Nelson – kalimba, zither

== Release history ==
| Region | Date | Label | Format | Catalog |
|---|---|---|---|---|
| United States | 1990 | Albertine | CD, CS, LP | ALB 4 |
