= No Surrender (Taproot song) =

Single by Taproot

from the album The Episodes
- Released: April 4, 2012
- Recorded: Saline, Michigan
- Genre: Alternative metal; nu metal; alternative rock
- Length: 4:25
- Label: Victory
- Songwriters: Mike DeWolf, Stephen Richards, Phil Lipscomb, Nick Fredell
- Producer: Tim Patalan

Taproot singles chronology
"Release Me" (2010)	"No Surrender" (2012)	"The Everlasting" (2012)

Music video
- "No Surrender" on YouTube

"No Surrender" is the lead single from Taproot's sixth studio album, The Episodes. It was first released online on March 1, 2012 before being officially released on April 4, 2012 through Victory Records.

== Music video ==
The music video for "No Surrender" was directed by Eric Richter and was filmed in Chicago.

== Charts ==
Chart (2012)	Peak position
US Mainstream Rock (Billboard)	38

== Personnel ==
- Stephen Richards – vocals
- Mike DeWolf – guitar
- Phil Lipscomb – bass
- Nick Fredell – drums
