= Mentobe =

EP by Taproot
- Released: 1998
- Recorded: 1997–1998
- Genre: Nu metal; rap metal
- Length: 20:11
- Label: Pimp Ass

Taproot chronology
...Something More Than Nothing (1998)	Mentobe (1998)	Upon Us (1999)

Mentobe is an EP by American alternative metal band Taproot, released in 1998. Two of the tracks, "Comeback" and "Mirror's Reflection", are included on the band's previous release ...Something More Than Nothing. All of the tracks on Mentobe are included on the band's 1999 album Upon Us. The EP received favorable reviews from the underground community.

Professional ratings
Review scores
Source	Rating
ThePRP	4/5 stars

== Track listing ==
No.	Title	Length
1.	"Shine"	4:05
2.	"Men2b"	4:03
3.	"Flatline"	4:42
4.	"Comeback"	3:59
5.	"Mirror's Reflection"	3:19
Total length:		20:11
