= Scrawl =

American indie rock band

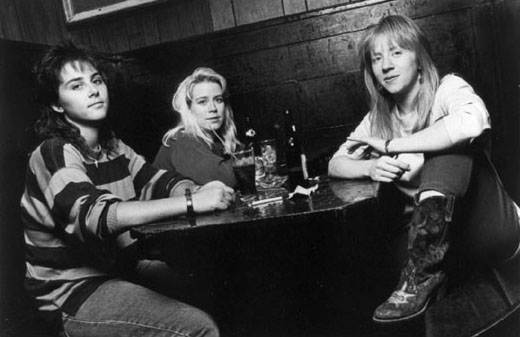
- Scrawl in 1988

Background information
- Also known as: Skull (1985)
- Origin: Columbus, Ohio, U.S.
- Genres: Indie rock; post-punk
- Years active: 1985–present
- Labels: Elektra; Feel Good All Over; No Other; Rough Trade; Simple Machines; Southern
- Members: Marcy Mays; Sue Harshe; Jovan Karcic
- Past members: Carla Sanseri; Carolyn O'Leary; Dana Marshall

Scrawl is an American indie rock band. The band were formed in Columbus, Ohio, in 1985 by guitarist and vocalist Marcy Mays, bassist and backing vocalist Sue Harshe and drummer Carolyn O'Leary, from the ashes of Mays' previous band Skull; they adopted their current name after playing their first show together. The band received consistent critical praise throughout their career but never gained wider commercial success or recognition, largely due to issues with the record labels they signed with.

In 1987, Scrawl released its debut album Plus, Also Too, which earned the band a deal with Rough Trade Records. The band released two albums, He's Drunk (1988) and Smallmouth (1990), before parting ways with the label. O'Leary left the band in 1992 and was replaced by Dana Marshall, who made his recording debut on Velvet Hammer (1993). The band moved to the major label Elektra Records for two albums, Travel On, Rider (1996) and Nature Film (1998), which were both underpromoted. Although they have not released any new material since Nature Film, Scrawl have continued to tour with drummer Jovan Karcic, who joined in 2007.

== History ==
=== Formation and Rough Trade Records (1985–1990) ===
Guitarist and vocalist Marcy Mays met bassist and backing vocalist Sue Harshe in 1984 while Harshe was visiting her boyfriend in Athens, Ohio, and the two quickly became friends. Both members had experience playing in hardcore bands; at the time of the meeting, Mays was in a band called Skull with bassist Jane Young and drummer Carla Sanseri, and Harshe in No Amerika! According to Harshe, they did not contribute to their bands' songwriting as they felt intimidated. When Mays relocated to Columbus in early 1985, she and Harshe both agreed they would write songs and be "masters of [their] own domain". Around this time, Skull were offered an opening slot for the Butthole Surfers by show promoter and School Kids and No Other Records owner Curt Scheiber. Young was not interested, and Harshe subsequently joined the band as her replacement. Before a show opening for the Meat Puppets in August 1985, Skull changed its name to Scrawl and Sanseri was replaced by Carolyn O'Leary. According to Harshe, the band chose Scrawl because they thought that Skull "sound[ed] too heavy metal", and because it rhymed with their former name. The band developed a following, and embarked on its first tour in 1986, performing in the cities of Lexington, Kentucky, Tallahassee and Jackson, Mississippi. Mays said that Scrawl did not expect themselves to be long-lived, telling the Chicago Tribune in 1990; "Everything for the next nine months [after the Meat Puppets show] was, 'Let's just do one more gig'. We never thought we'd be together one more month."

With support from their friends, Scrawl recorded their debut album Plus Also Too in September 1986, for less than $500. The album was released through Scheiber's No Other Records label in May 1987, to positive reviews and media response. After Robert Christgau gave the album a favourable review in his "Consumer Guide" for The Village Voice, Scrawl received offers from Homestead, Twin/Tone and Rough Trade Records. Following a performance for all three labels at CBGB in New York City—which Mays later recalled as "one of the worst" the band played—Scrawl signed to Rough Trade in the spring of 1988. The band then recorded their second album, He's Drunk, at Paisely Park Studios in Minneapolis. Released in October 1988, the album had sold 4,000 copies by 1990. Following its release, Scrawl toured with Firehose; they continued to tour the United States in support of the album until March 1989. After a hiatus due to O'Leary breaking her arm, Scrawl recorded their third album Smallmouth with producer Gary Smith in November 1989. After the album’s release in February 1990, Scrawl went on a month-long U.S. tour, followed by a four-week European tour in May of the same year. In the fall of 1990, Scrawl left Rough Trade following abortive negotiations with the label over their fourth album and the release of a four-song promotional extended play of covers recorded by Steve Albini. The label declared bankruptcy shortly thereafter, taking the band's albums out of print; they were forced to buy back their master tapes at public auction.

=== Simple Machines and Velvet Hammer (1991–1995) ===
In January and April 1991, Scrawl recorded an extended play with Steve Albini, Bloodsucker. The EP's lyrics reflect Scrawl's frustrations with the music industry, particularly after the band spent a year unsuccessfully negotiating a record deal with Sub Pop. Released in October 1991 through Feel Good All Over Records, the EP quickly sold out of its first pressing of 2,000 copies. Although it suffered from poor distribution, Bloodsucker received strong reviews, and was ranked ninth on the 1991 Pazz & Jop poll for extended plays, tying with releases from Dinosaur Jr. and Prisonshake. Around the time of its release, the band played shows with the Afghan Whigs and My Bloody Valentine.

In May 1992, O'Leary left Scrawl. The following month, the band released the 7" single "Misery (Someone Is Winning) / Just Plain Bad", before embarking on the "Foxcore, My Ass" tour as an acoustic duo. By the end of 1992, the band had recruited Dana Marshall as their new drummer and signed with Simple Machines Records and Southern Records (for the UK). Harshe said that the band were no longer worried about working with men again as they felt they had become better songwriters and performers. In January 1993, Scrawl worked with Albini again for the recording of Velvet Hammer, which was released on November 8, 1993. In the fall of 1994, the band embarked on a tour of Europe and performed at the Reading Festival in the United Kingdom.

=== Elektra Records (1996–1999) ===
In 1996, Scrawl were signed to Elektra Records by A&R rep Terry Tolkin. The band released its major label debut, Travel On Rider, in August 1996. The band toured the Northeastern US in October prior to a supporting tour with Wilco. For their sixth album, Nature Film , Scrawl re-recorded six of their Rough Trade-era songs and a cover of Public Image Ltd's "Public Image", alongside six new songs. Harshe said that the band wanted to re-record their old songs as they had changed and "become more fluid live" over the years, and because "the thought of giving [Elektra] 12 new songs seemed depressing to us" due to the label's lacklustre promotion of Travel On, Rider. Mays later said that the band "were basically saying 'fuck em' by not giving [the label] anything new". The album was released in May 1998 and was supported by a tour supporting Mike Watt. Six weeks after its release, Elektra informed Scrawl via fax that they had dropped the band from its roster. In response, Scrawl launched a mailing campaign with its supporters and more than 250 people on its mailing list to send a postcard to label head Sylvia Rhone, featuring a copy of the fax from Elektra on one side and the following message for a sender to tick off and sign on the other:

Elektra has dropped Scrawl. I am: 1) Disgusted; 2) Relieved; 3) Out of the Closet; 4) Other

In a 1998 interview with CMJ New Music Report, Harshe said that they were not surprised about being dropped from Elektra due to the minimal support for both Travel On, Rider and Nature Film, claiming that the label "never sent out anything other than advance CDs" and that both releases had sold less copies than their independent albums, although she did not feel bitter towards them. As of August 1998, the former had sold 2,115 copies, whilst the latter had sold only 956 copies. David Martin of the Cleveland Scene associated Scrawl with the "Columbus Curse" of bands from the city that were "wooed, signed, and tossed aside like chew toys by major labels", including Royal Crescent Mob, the Toll and Watershed. A planned tour of the west coast of the United States with the Spinanes, due to commence in October 1998, was cancelled after Mays broke her collarbone, which also hindered the band's plans to work on new material. The band resumed touring in 1999.

=== Subsequent activities (2000–present) ===
On March 16, 2000, Scrawl performed their final show with Dana Marshall, who moved to Sweden shortly afterward. In early 2001, Scrawl played a few shows as a duo, with Mays and Harshe handling keyboards in the absence of a drummer. In 2007, Scrawl reunited to celebrate the 10th anniversary of the Little Brother club in Columbus, with Jovan Karcic, formerly the guitarist of fellow Columbus band Gaunt, joining as their new drummer. That same year, Harshe formed a new band, Fort Shame. The band has continued to tour and perform since then.

In a 2023 interview with Matter News, Mays shared that Scrawl had started creating new instrumentals together since the summer, with plans to eventually release a new album, though they have set no deadlines.The band performed at the 2024 edition DromFest in Catskill, New York, and at the 2025 edition, with Tsunami's Luther Gray filling in on drums.

== Musical style and influences ==
Scrawl have been described as indie rock and post-punk. The band's first two albums, Plus, Also, Too and He's Drunk, were described as indie pop. Gregory McGovern of Hot Press described the band's style as "minimalist rock ‘n' roll". The band's musical influences include Cheap Trick, Paula Abdul, Head East, Judas Priest, the Meat Puppets, the Roches and Wire. In a 1995 interview with The Michigan Daily, Harshe highlighted Mays' background in country and western music and her own interest in 1970s pop music as elements she thought came through in the band's music.

== Reception and legacy ==
Will Hermes referred to Scrawl as "[o]ne of America's great unsung post-punk bands". Though the band consistently received critical praise throughout their career, they never gained wider commercial success or recognition, largely due to issues with the record labels they signed with. Jill Hamilton of The Ann Arbor News remarked in 1994 that "It's not that people don't like Scrawl. They usually like the band quite a bit—if they ever get a chance to hear them." Despite their limited success, Scrawl retained a passionate fanbase, whom Mays would later credit with preventing them from breaking up in a 1999 interview with Chapel Hill News: "I've never thought about how much weight that carries, but it must be a lot. We wouldn't keep on playing if there weren't people to listen."

Around the time of Velvet Hammer's release, journalists began to hail Scrawl as a precursor to the foxcore and riot grrrl movements. Although the band did not identify with either and were "deeply suspicious" of their associations with riot grrrl by a "trend-obsessed media"—as suggested by their 1992 "Foxcore, My Ass" tour—"many of the musicians involved in [the] movement openly acknowledged their debt to [Scrawl]'s late 80's recordings", according to Colin Larkin of The Encyclopedia of Popular Music. Kathleen Hanna cited Scrawl as an influence on her music, whilst Tsumani guitarist Jenny Toomey called them an "enormous influence on what we did and how we did it."

== Band members ==
Current line-up

- Marcy Mays - vocals, guitar (1985–present)
- Sue Harshe - bass, vocals (1985–present)
- Jovan Karcic - drums (2007–present)
Past members
- Carla Sanseri - drums (1985)
- Carolyn O'Leary - drums (1985–1992)
- Dana Marshall - drums (1992–2000)

Timeline

== Discography ==
=== Studio albums ===
List of studio albums, with selected details
| Title | Album details |
|---|---|
| Plus, Also, Too | Released: May 1987; Label: No Other; Format: LP |
| He's Drunk | Released: October 1988; Label: Rough Trade; Format: CS, LP |
| Smallmouth | Released: February 1990; Label: Rough Trade; Format: CD, CS, LP |
| Velvet Hammer | Released: November 8, 1993; Label: Simple Machines; Format: CD, CS, LP |
| Travel On, Rider | Released: August 20, 1996; Label: Elektra; Format: CD, CS, LP |
| Nature Film | Released: May 19, 1998; Label: Elektra; Format: CD, CS |

=== Compilation albums ===
List of compilation albums, with selected details
| Title | Split details |
|---|---|
| He's Drunk/Plus, Also, Too | Released: 1989; Label: Rough Trade; Format: CD |

=== Extended plays ===
List of extended plays, with selected details
| Title | Split details |
|---|---|
| Bloodsucker | Released: October 1991; Label: Feel Good All Over; Format: CD, CS, LP |

=== Split releases ===
List of split releases, with selected details
| Title | Split details |
|---|---|
| January / Working Holiday (Scrawl and Versus) | Released: March 1993; Label: Simple Machines; Format: 7-inch |
| I'm Going Out Of My Way / Breaker Breaker (Stereolab and Scrawl) | Released: 1994; Label: Radiopaque; Format: 7-inch |

=== Singles ===
List of singles
| Title | Year | Album |
|---|---|---|
| "Misery (Someone is Winning) / Just Plain Bad" | 1992 | Non-album single |
| "Your Mother Wants to Know" | 1993 | Velvet Hammer |
| "Good Under Pressure" | 1995 | Travel On, Rider |
