= Burnt Sienna (album) =

Studio album by Azalia Snail
- Released: 1992
- Recorded: Charles Street Studios (New York City, NY)
- Genre: Psychedelic folk
- Length: 39:49
- Label: Funky Mushroom
- Producer: Mike Burns, Azalia Snail

Azalia Snail chronology
Snailbait (1990)	Burnt Sienna (1992)	How to Live With a Tiger (1993)

Professional ratings
Review scores
Source	Rating
Allmusic	4/5 stars

Burnt Sienna is the second studio album by Azalia Snail, released in 1992 by Funky Mushroom.

== Track listing ==
All tracks are written by Azalia Snail.

No.	Title	Length
1.	"St. Nowhere"	4:31
2.	"Keep Me Warmer"	2:45
3.	"C/O '66"	3:28
4.	"Worldwind Series"	2:27
5.	"The Amulet"	2:58
6.	"Hard to Say"	3:27
7.	"Hit by a Car"	3:32
8.	"The Suspect I"	1:52
9.	"They Are Like the Sea"	3:22
10.	"Farther Away"	2:42
11.	"Armoured Guard"	3:10
12.	"Chinese Horse Torture"	2:09
13.	"Sienna Burning"	3:26

== Personnel ==
Adapted from Burnt Sienna liner notes.

- Azalia Snail – lead vocals, guitar, harmonica, kalimba, percussion, production

Musicians

- Mike Burns – percussion, production, guitar (1, 7)
- Ray D'Africo – guitar (2, 13)
- Andy Nelson – kalimba, percussion
- Dan Oxenberg – guitar (8, 10)

== Release history ==
Region	Date	Label	Format	Catalog
United States	1992	Funky Mushroom	CD, LP	FM-011
