= Calling (Taproot song) =

Single by Taproot

from the album Blue-Sky Research
- Released: June 27, 2005
- Recorded: 2004 Los Angeles, California
- Genre: Post-grunge
- Length: 3:53
- Label: Atlantic; Velvet Hammer
- Songwriters: Stephen Richards, Jarrod Montague, Mike DeWolf, Philip Lipscomb; Jonah Matranga (co-writer)
- Producer: Toby Wright

Taproot singles chronology
"Mine" (2003)	"Calling" (2005)	"Birthday" (2005)

Music video
- "Calling" on YouTube

"Calling" is the first single released from Taproot's third studio album Blue-Sky Research.

== Music video ==
The song's music video was directed by Moh Azima.

== Charts ==
Chart (2005)	Peak position
US Mainstream Rock Tracks	11
US Modern Rock Tracks	23

== Personnel ==
- Stephen Richards – lead vocals, guitar
- Mike DeWolf – guitar
- Phil Lipscomb – bass
- Jarrod Montague – drums

Additional personnel

- Jonah Matranga – backing vocals
