= The Peel Sessions (Trumans Water album) =

Live album by Trumans Water
- Released: 1995
- Recorded: 1993, 1994
- Label: Strange Fruit

Trumans Water chronology
Milktrain to Paydirt (1995)	The Peel Sessions (1995)	Action Ornaments (1997)

The Peel Sessions is a 1995 album by Trumans Water, released on the Strange Fruit label. It collects all of the songs recorded during their three appearances on John Peel's BBC Radio 1 programme.

== Track listing ==
11 May 1993:
1. "All Wet West of Washington" 3:17
2. "Long End of a Firearm" 8:32
3. "Large Organs" 2:57
4. "Seven Holes" 5:08
5. "Hair Junk Fiver" 1:33

Personnel:
Ely Moyal (Drums)
Kevin Branstetter (Bass, Backing vocals)
Glen Galloway (Guitar, Vocals)
Kirk Branstetter (Guitar, Backing vocals)
Will Prentice (Bulgarian pipes on tracks 1 and 2)

26 September 1993:
6. "Death to Dead Things" 2:54
7. "Girler Too" 4:17
8. "Esoterica of Abyssynia" [Sun City Girls cover] 3:28
9. "Kingdom of Heaven" [Nation of Ulysses cover] 1:44
10. "No Naked Lights" 1:28
11. "True Tilt Pinball" 2:14

Personnel:
Glen Galloway (Guitar, Vocals)
Kirk Branstetter (Guitar, Vocals)
Kevin Branstetter (Bass, Vocals)
Mike Mooradian (Drums, Vocals)

10 May 1994:
12. "Lick Observatory" 6:36
13. "Go-Go Dancer Solidified" 2:41
14. "Electro Muerta" 2:25
15. "Talking Hockey with Strangers" 5:04
16. "St. Job (Int'l Gore)" 3:06

Personnel:
Kevin Cascell (Drums, Piano, Vocals, Guitar on track 16)
Kevin Branstetter (Guitar, Piano, Vocals, Drums on track 16)
Kirk Branstetter (Guitar, Piano, Vocals)
Dean Pritchard (Exhaust pipe)
