= Spasm Smash XXXOXOX Ox & Ass =

Studio album by Trumans Water
- Released: March 1993
- Genre: Post-hardcore; Noise rock Experimental rock
- Label: Homestead

Trumans Water chronology
Of Thick Tum (1992)	Spasm Smash XXXOXOX Ox & Ass (1993)	Godspeed the Punchline (1994)

Professional ratings
Review scores
Source	Rating
Allmusic	3/5 stars
Lime Lizard	(favorable)
Melody Maker	(favorable)

Spasm Smash XXXOXOX Ox & Ass is the second album by Trumans Water. It is their first (and only) double-album and was released in 1993 on Homestead Records in the United States and Elemental Records in the UK. There is also a Japanese re-release of the album with a radically different track listing. Everett True, in a 1993 review of the album, described it "Imagine Pavement if they were five Gary Youngs with the songwriting ability of two Steve Malkmuses". Chris Sharp, writing in Lime Lizard stated "there are 20 tracks here, but each one feels like at least three songs grafted together in some bizarre musico-genetic experiment".

== Track listing ==
US and UK standard release

1. "Aroma of Gina Arnold" - 8:17
2. "Speeds Exceeding" - 3:26
3. "Good Blood After Bad" - 2:44
4. "Rations" - 2:21
5. "Death to Dead Things" - 3:07
6. "Sun Go Out" - 2:11
7. "Bludgeon Elites & Stagger" - 3:51
8. "Limbs" - 4:43
9. "Athlete Who Is Suck" - 4:08
10. "Top of Morning" - 4:39
11. "Lo Priest" - 5:03
12. "Soar Ossinaxx at Long Last" - 2:15
13. "Our Doctors Think We're Blind" - 4:09
14. "Finger 6 Steps Ahead of Our Minds" - 1:15
15. "La Jolla My Armpit" - 3:58
16. "K-Song" - 4:45
17. "Mindstab Forklift" - 2:48
18. "To Milktruck" - 4:09
19. "Bladderstomp: Krautrock" - 7:04
20. "The Sad Skinhead" (Faust cover) - 2:20

1995 Japanese King Records version

1. "La Jolla My Armpit" - 3:58
2. "All the Ancients" - 0:48
3. "Rations" - 2:21
4. "It Slew Me" - 1:56
5. "To Milktruck" - 4:09
6. "Old Brockbank" - 2:15
7. "Soar Ossinaxx at Long Last" - 2:15
8. "Tenderfoot" - 1:34
9. "Aroma of Gina Arnold" - 8:17
10. "Spitvalve Opus" - 0:53
11. "Good Blood After Bad" - 2:44
12. "Unicorn the Girl" - 1:16
13. "Our Doctors Think We're Blind" - 4:09
14. "Up the Head" - 0:56
15. "Lo Priest" - 5:03
16. "Bent Time Hand" - 1:53
17. "Death to Dead Things" - 3:07
18. "Vacation Starts Great" - 2:07
19. "Limbs" - 4:43
20. "Hurting Eye Flower" - 2:11
21. "Sun Go Out" - 2:11
22. "One Traditional Wound" - 1:19
23. "Athlete Who Is Suck" - 4:08
24. "Derailleur" - 1:54
25. "K-Song" - 4:45

Track listing notes: This version of the album contains only thirteen of the twenty songs included on the original album (same recordings and mixes as the standard issue of the album); these alternate with twelve new tracks that resemble the improvised music contained on the bands' series of Godspeed albums and on their cassette releases.
