= Trumans Water =

American rock band

- Origin: San Diego, California; Portland, Oregon (since 1994)
- Genres: Indie rock, electronica
- Years active: 1991–present
- Labels: Homestead Records, Drunken Fish
- Members: Kirk Branstetter; Kevin Branstetter; Mike Coumatos; John Schier
- Past members: Glen Galloway; Ely Moyal; Andres Malinao; Kevin Cascell; Mike Lupro; Paul Haines
- Website: trumanswater.com

Trumans Water are an American indie rock band, hailing from San Diego, California. They have released over a dozen albums over their career, on which they collaborated with acts in genre, including Azalia Snail, Chan Marshall and Thurston Moore.

== Background ==
Trumans Water was formed by the brothers Kirk and Kevin Branstetter, and the original drummer Jeff Jones in San Diego in 1991, after they were given a guitar and a bass guitar by a friend's father. They advertised for a "lead singer, brain optional", and recruited Glen Galloway as a result. Other members of the band have included Ely Moyal, Andres Malinao and Kevin Cascell. Captain Beefheart, Wire, The Boredoms, Sun City Girls, Pavement and Sonic Youth have all been identified as influences, and during the course of the band's history Trumans Water has produced experimental indie rock, often with a substantial element of improvisation. Kevin Branstetter described the band's approach in 1993: "The spirit of the thing is what we want to capture, mess things up, like totally skewing everything, destroying everything and still making it totally listenable" and their recording process: "We record everything live, all play at the same time".

The disc jockey John Peel effectively shot the band to indie stardom in the UK when he played their first LP, Of Thick Tum, uninterrupted and in its entirety during an edition of his BBC Radio One show. The band subsequently recorded three sessions for Peel's show.

The Branstetter brothers relocated to Portland, Oregon in 1994 without Galloway and are the only original members still active in the band. Galloway assumed the Glen Galaxy name to record as Soul-Junk, an experimental Christian rock band, before returning to Trumans Water in 1998. Kevin Branstetter subsequently moved to France in 1995. Being on different continents for the last several years has curbed their musical output but by no means stopped it; they have released six albums despite the geographical separation.

Trumans Water has recently added the bass guitar player Mike Coumatos after more than ten years touring and recording as a three piece (two guitars and drums). A new drummer, John Schier, has been added as well.

Trumans Water has been cited as an influence by several bands including The Cribs.

In 2011, Kevin Branstetter moved to France. Worlds Dirtiest Sport is his side project doing solo (or with guests) guitar/bass guitar/loops/noise songs. The project was started as an outlet when one or more other Trumans was unavailable.

== Discography ==
=== Albums ===
- Of Thick Tum (1992, Homestead Records)
- Spasm Smash XXXOXOX Ox & Ass (1993, Homestead Records)
- Godspeed the Punchline (1994, Homestead Records)
- Godspeed the Static (1994, Drunken Fish)
- Godspeed the Hemorrhage (1994, Homestead Records)
- Godspeed the Vortex (1994, Way Out Sound)
- Milktrain to Paydirt (1995, Homestead Records)
- The Peel Sessions (1995, Strange Fruit)
- Action Ornaments (1996, Runt)
- Apistogramma (1997, Justice My Eye / Elevated Loin)
- Fragments of a Lucky Break (1998, Emperor Jones)
- Trumans Water (2001, Emperor Jones)
- You are in the Line of Fire and they are Shooting at You (2003, Homesleep Records)
- The Singles 1992-1997 (2003, No Sides)
- Rosolina Mar meets Trumans Water (2007, Robotradiorecords - split with Rosolina Mar)
- O Zeta Zunis (August 24, 2010, Asthmatic Kitty Records)
- Live In Oslo (2017, Handmade Records)

=== Singles and EPs ===
- Our Scars Like Badges (7-inch EP, 1992, Homestead Records)
- Laugh Light's Lit (7-inch EP, 1992, Drunken Fish)
- Jubileeeee (7-inch EP, 1992, Way Out Sound)
- "Hey Fish" (7-inch, 1993, Drunken Fish)
- 10 x My Age (CD EP/10", 1993, Elemental Records)
- Have You Got It Yet? (Live in London) (7-inch, 1993, Fear & Loathing zine, Dirter Promotions and Elemental Records)
- "Skyjacker" (7-inch, 1994 Sympathy for the Record Industry)
- Spazz Rockdance Inferno (7-inch EP, 1994, Clawfist)
- The First Dead Man of Diluvia (7-inch EP, 1995, Howardian/Wantage)
- The Great Flood (7-inch EP, 1996, Footprint Records)
- "Miss Spaceship"/"Radar 1941" (7-inch, 2000, Sub Pop)

=== Cassettes ===
- Santee Busbill (1993?, Destroy All Music)
- Couch of the Spastics (1994, Chocolate Monk)
- Cough Forth Such Dilemmas (1995, Union Pole)
- No Dead Space (1997, Union Pole)
- Lotions & Creams (2014, Ghoulhouse Records, with Octogrape & Permanent Makeup)
- Chèvre Au Lait (2019, Novitic Industries)
