= Poem (song) =

Single by Taproot

from the album Welcome
- Released: October 14, 2002 (US); December 16, 2003 (UK)
- Recorded: 2001–2002
- Genre: Nu metal; alternative metal
- Length: 3:09
- Label: Atlantic
- Songwriters: Mike DeWolf, Stephen Richards, Phil Lipscomb, Jarrod Montague
- Producer: Toby Wright

Taproot singles chronology
"I" (2001)	"Poem" (2002)	"Mine" (2003)

Music video
- "Poem" on YouTube

"Poem" is a song by American alternative metal band Taproot and the lead single from their second major label album, Welcome. It was released in 2002 and became the most successful Taproot single, reaching #5 on the Billboard Mainstream Rock Tracks. The track, as well as its music video, were heavily played throughout the several months following its release.

== Overview ==
Taproot worked with producer Toby Wright during the making of Welcome. According to frontman Stephen Richards: "We went into the sessions with thirty songs written and ready for pre-production, but Wright pared the thirty down to four. And he had us write fifteen more. But it was actually really great. He saw a lot of similarities between songs that we had written, a lot of one-dimensional writing, and just suggested that we take the best parts of each and cut them down and combine them and make them better. So we took some of the good old stuff and reworked into better songs, and some of the newer stuff is actually the material we're most excited about." "Poem" was one of the songs that was written before production of the album began. Guitarist Mike DeWolf elaborated:

"That's actually the first song we wrote for the album. . . We played it at the 2001 Ozzfest and there was a big reaction. The kids went nuts for it even more than to our other songs that they'd heard a million times before. In production we changed little things here and there to make it stronger, but it's basically the same song."

"Poem" was performed on the December 13, 2002 edition of Last Call with Carson Daly. The band was late due to weather troubles in Chicago but treated the audience to a half-hour set. A live version of the song was included on the Music as a Weapon II album in 2004. "Poem" was also featured on the soundtracks for both MVP Baseball 2003 and True Crime: Streets of L.A.

The popular single begins with a few solo guitar chords before breaking into a heavy introduction. The singing style continuously shifts back and forth between harsh and clean vocals, and its chorus lyrics reference the instructions seen on fire alarms ("In case of fire, break the glass and move on into your own").

== Music video ==
Taproot worked with directing team Brothers Strause, whose other work includes Linkin Park and Godsmack, on the music video for "Poem." Shooting took place on August 8 and 9 in Los Angeles with broadcasts beginning in early September 2002. The "Poem" video has Taproot performing inside a crumbling old house. A young man and woman are seen intensely kissing and groping one another amidst the chaotic destruction of the building. Vocalist Stephen Richards unpleasantly bears witness to the couple as he sings, giving the impression of a bitter history between them. The video cost $225,000 to produce.

== Track listing ==
No.	Title	Length
1.	"Poem (2 Self)"	3:09
2.	"Transparent"	4:23
3.	"Free (Succeed)"	3:23

- The songs "Transparent" and "Free (Succeed)" were recorded during the Welcome sessions but ultimately cut from the album. They were instead included as B-sides to the "Poem" single. "Free (Succeed)"'s lyrics however, still remain on the US pressing of "Welcome."

== Charts ==
Chart (2002–2003)	Peak positions
UK Singles (OCC)	92
UK Rock & Metal (OCC)	8
US Bubbling Under Hot 100 (Billboard)	6
US Mainstream Rock Tracks (Billboard)	5
US Modern Rock Tracks (Billboard)	10

== Personnel ==
- Stephen Richards – vocals
- Mike DeWolf – guitar
- Phil Lipscomb – bass guitar
- Jarrod Montague – drums
- Toby Wright – producer
