= Soft Bloom =

Studio album by Azalia Snail
- Released: June 29, 1999
- Genre: Psychedelic folk
- Length: 44:39
- Label: Dark Beloved Cloud
- Producer: Azalia Snail

Azalia Snail chronology
Breaker Mortar (1997)	Soft Bloom (1999)	Brazen Arrows (2001)

Professional ratings
Review scores
Source	Rating
Allmusic	3/5 stars

Soft Bloom is the eighth studio album by Azalia Snail, released on June 29, 1999 by Dark Beloved Cloud.

== Track listing ==
All tracks are written by Azalia Snail.

No.	Title	Length
1.	"Purr in a Gyre"	4:39
2.	"Layton Hollow"	3:48
3.	"Morrow Bay"	3:11
4.	"Broken Toy"	2:47
5.	"[untitled]"	0:22
6.	"Who Razed the Spy?"	2:41
7.	"Alien Ease"	5:11
8.	"A Low Coast Move"	4:39
9.	"[untitled]"	0:20
10.	"Bathing in Space"	3:57
11.	"How Sublyme the Tyme"	2:33
12.	"It Grows on You"	2:46
13.	"Soul Clap"	1:58
14.	"Savior"	2:56
15.	"Lite Crate"	2:51

== Personnel ==
Adapted from Soft Bloom liner notes.

- Azalia Snail – vocals, instruments, production

== Release history ==
Region	Date	Label	Format	Catalog
United States	1999	Dark Beloved Cloud	CD	dbc 221
