= Azalia Snail =

American singer-songwriter

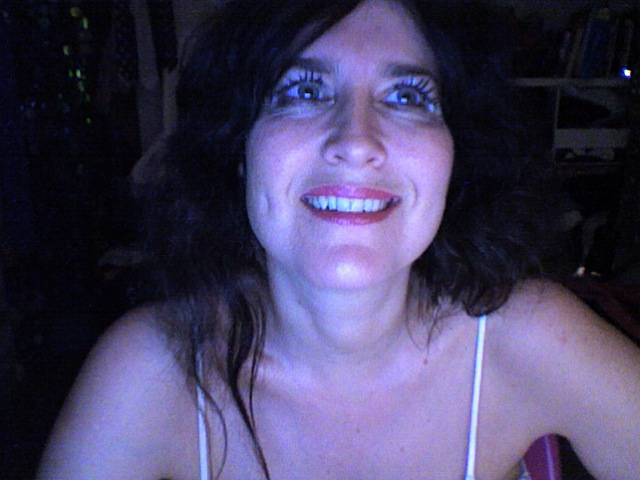

Background information
- Born: Azalia Snail; Philadelphia, United States
- Genres: Neo-psychedelia, psychedelic folk, indie rock, lo-fi
- Occupation: Musician – singer-songwriter – filmmaker
- Instruments: Guitar, keyboards, percussion, vocals
- Years active: 1987–present
- Labels: Funky Mushroom, Dark Beloved Cloud
- Website: facebook.com/AZALiA-SNAiL-15605644956/

Azalia Snail is an American avant-garde singer-songwriter and musician. She is a multi-instrumentalist active in neo-psychedelia, psychedelic folk, and indie rock, played a prominent role in the 1990s lo-fi music scene, and was dubbed the "Queen of Lo-Fi." She is one half of the duo LoveyDove.

Snail recorded 15 solo albums between 1990 and 2024 and has written film scores for several indie features and short films. She has toured the United States, Europe, and Australasia.

In 2000, she won the Los Angeles LA Weekly Music Award for Best New-Genre/Uncategorizable Artist.

== Early life and influences ==
Azalia Snail was born in Philadelphia to hippie parents and was named after the azaleas that grew near their home. At age six, her mother persuaded her to take piano lessons, and while Snail agreed, she was "frustrated by the whole disciplinary process". This prompted her to switch to guitar, giving rise to more lessons and musical discipline. At 15, Snail bought an electric guitar against her parents' wishes, who wanted her to play acoustic instruments. She was forced to return the guitar and, on doing so, told her mother, "That's all I want in my life – this guitar."

Snail cites Lou Reed as her biggest musical influence, in particular his albums Coney Island Baby and Rock and Roll Heart. She also credits Brian Eno, T Rex, Patti Smith, The Kink Kronikles, and The Troggs Tapes as significant influences.

== Career ==
=== Solo albums ===
After graduating high school, Snail moved to New York City and worked as a writer. In 1987, she began jamming with other musicians in bars, including Fly Ashtray in The Bronx and soon branched off on her own to record solo music. In the late 1980s, she sent samples of her material to a radio show called "Lo-Fi" on WFMU in New Jersey. The station's DJ played her songs regularly, and she soon became known as the "Queen of Lo-Fi". Snail later distanced herself from the lo-fi label, saying her music is now recorded professionally. However, the exposure she gained on the radio show prompted her to start performing as a solo artist. During the 1990s, she toured North America and Europe with multiple bands, including Low, Trumans Water and The Grifters.

Snail's music shuns conventional melody and often includes elements of noise. Her unconventional approach to music was influenced, in part, by her experiences with hallucinogens. In the early 1990s, she occasionally used LSD and magic mushrooms to enhance her perceptions. Though she has never used hallucinogens since, she says, "I'm a big believer in Timothy Leary and Aldous Huxley and a lot of important philosophers who have all taken drugs to expand their horizons. I don't think you have to keep doing it throughout your whole life, and I don't believe everybody needs that, but it definitely turns you on to a whole new world and possibilities. I was interested in experiencing some of the things my favorite writers, artists and musicians have. I wanted to feel how they felt."

During the 1990s, Snail wrote and recorded eight solo albums. The albums generally featured several guest musicians, but Snail played most of the instruments herself, including guitars, zithers, keyboards, theremin, and percussion. She also engineered and produced many of the albums.

Snail recorded Brazen Arrows in 2001 and Avec Amour in 2006. The New Zealand-based Powertool record label released Petal Metal, a two-CD retrospective of Snail's work, in 2008. She toured New Zealand in January 2010. I. In Perfect Sound Forever, Khider described Snail as an "adept indie rocker" with a "quirky, creative edge".

In 2011, Snail released the album Celestial Respect. It included Jeff Levitz on guitar and bass, Kevin Litrow on guest vocals, and Taylor Wheeldin on trumpet. Described as "a tribute to the spaciousness and atmosphere of the celestial beyond & within", it featured the tracks Solar Riser, Space Heater, User System, Fallen Down, and Burnt Cookies. Left Hip Magazine's reviewer Michael Byrne described Celestial Respect as "a hopeful space pop melodrama that seeks to reignite human kindness through music that feels and sounds electronic and mechanical, creating an intriguing dichotomy to muse over while listening."

In November 2017, Radio SiriusXM debuted Azalia Snail's cover of Tom Petty's classic track The Wild One, Forever.

In February 2018, Snail released the album Neon Resistance to positive reviews. Daniel Sylvester of Exclaim! said the album "beams with joyousness and youthful vigour." Abstract Analogue said it had "the perfect measure of everything to make it soar and add to the tally of outstanding songs here that will stand the test of time." Raymond Cummings of Splice Today wrote, "At its most beautifully gauzy, Neon Resistance plays like an extended hang-glide over canyons of warm, gooey, dreamy good feeling." In an interview, Snail stated that the album's theme is "Staying true to yourself, your vision, and the ones to whom you surround yourself. The resistance, after all, is irresistible."

Snail recorded her 2024 album POWERLOVER, released on Cloud Recordings, during the COVID-19 pandemic. It was described as her "musical response to a world navigating through uncertain times, offering melodies that promote kindness and redemption" and evoking, as she put it, "an urgent plea for humanity to be kinder." It generated the single and video "Zap You of That Hate." Strange Brew said "In a world often besieged by negativity, Azaila Snail emerges as a beacon of light." It’s Psychedelic Baby Magazine said "Azalia Snail, the trailblazing avant-garde musician renowned for her unique blend of experimental sounds and heartfelt emotion, returns with her new album, ‘Powerlover,’ out on Cloud Recordings." Queen City Sounds and Art said "Azalia Snail Resets Your Brain From the Conditioned Conformity of Modern Life With her Lo-Fi Psychedelic Electronic album."

Azalia’s follow up to Powerlover will be “Gentle Mental” releasing summer 2026 on Cloud Recordings.

=== Collaborations ===
While residing in New York City in the 1990s, Snail first collaborated with filmmaker Sadie Benning to score the music for a video shown on MTV. She then relocated to Los Angeles in December 1999 to work in film, where she wrote film scores for several independent feature films and short films, including the soundtrack to MTV's Ain't Nuthin' But a She Thing. She also scored three feature films for Christopher G. Fieri.

In 2000, Snail and Brad Laner/The Electric Company shared the Los Angeles LA Weekly Music Award for Best New-Genre/Uncategorizable Artist.

Since 2012, she has been one half of the band LoveyDove, along with her husband, the multi-instrumentalist, songwriter, and producer Dan West. LoveyDove's debut album was released in 2014 by LAs Fine. Snail has expressed a love of collaboration, saying, "Collaboration has always been beneficial and appealing to me. I wouldn't have made all this music without the contribution of so many people."

Snail Meets West, released by Union Pole in 2015, is the free jazz duo of indie mainstay Azalia Snail and psychedelic maestro Dan West. Both have a long resume of various pop and roll projects, including LoveyDove. Snail Meets West is a tribute to the late free jazz pioneer Ornette Coleman, who influenced many musicians. Snail plays drums, and West plays piano.

In September 2014, LoveyDove performed four shows with King Missile frontman John S. Hall in Los Angeles. The trio officially took the name King Missile IV, toured New Zealand in February 2015, and recorded a six-song EP, This Fuckin' Guy, released on Powertool Records. In 2019, King Missile IV changed their name to You, Me and This Fuckin’ Guy and recorded their debut LP, Garden Variety Fuckers, released by Dromedary Records on April 17, 2020.

In 2022, Snail directed the video for Low's single "All Night" from their final album Hey What.

=== Collaborations with Dick Van Dyke ===
In 2023, Azalia Snail met entertainer Dick Van Dyke and his wife, Arlene at their grandson Wes Van Dyke's art opening at Malibu City Hall. Since then, Azalia Snail has become the resident DJ at their Vandy Camp events, both at their home in Malibu, and at the Dick and Arlene Van Dyke Theatre and Dreamland in Malibu. West has accompanied Van Dyke and his band The Vantastix on piano at many of these same events.

== Discography ==
Studio albums

- Snailbait (1990, Albertine)
- Burnt Sienna (1992, Funky Mushroom)
- How to Live With a Tiger (with Susanne Lewis as "Hail/Snail") (1993, Funky Mushroom)
- Fumarole Rising (1994, Funky Mushroom)
- Escape Maker (1995, Garden of Delights)
- Blue Danube (1995, Normal)
- Deep Motif (1996, Candy Floss)
- Breaker Mortar (1997, Dark Beloved Cloud)
- Soft Bloom (1999, Dark Beloved Cloud)
- Brazen Arrows (2001, Dark Beloved Cloud)
- Avec Amour (2006, True Classical)
- Celestial Respect (2011, Silber Records)
- LoveyDove (2014, LAs Fine)
- Snail Meets West (2015, Union Pole)
- Neon Resistance (2018, Silber Records/USA & Thokei Tapes/Germany)
- POWERLOVER (2024, Cloud Recordings)
- Gentle Mental (2026, Cloud Recordings)

Compilation albums

- The Teenage Bedroom Tapes 1987–1991 (1992, Union Pole)
- Petal Metal (2008, Powertool)
