= The Episodes =

Studio album by Taproot
- Released: April 10, 2012
- Studio: The Loft (Saline, Michigan)
- Genre: Alternative metal; alternative rock; nu metal
- Length: 41:54
- Label: Victory
- Producer: Tim Patalan

Taproot chronology
Plead the Fifth (2010)	The Episodes (2012)	Besides (2018)

Singles from The Episodes
- 1. "No Surrender" Released: April 4, 2012; 2. "The Everlasting" Released: September 11, 2012

Professional ratings
Review scores
Source	Rating
AllMusic	3/5 stars
Loudwire	4/5 stars

The Episodes is the sixth studio album by American alternative metal band Taproot, released on April 10, 2012, through Victory Records. The album peaked at no. 21 on the Billboard Hard Rock Albums chart with "No Surrender" peaking at No. 38 on the Mainstream Rock chart. This is the last album with drummer Nick Fredell and longtime guitarist Mike DeWolf.

== Track listing ==
All tracks are written by Taproot.

No.	Title	Length
1.	"Good Morning"	4:36
2.	"No Surrender"	4:25
3.	"Lost Boy"	4:21
4.	"Memorial Park"	4:42
5.	"The Everlasting"	3:48
6.	"Around the Bend"	4:01
7.	"A Kiss from the Sky"	3:26
8.	"Strange & Fascinating"	4:10
9.	"A Golden Grey"	4:00
10.	"We Don't Belong Here"	4:27

== Personnel ==
Taproot

- Stephen Richards – vocals, guitar
- Mike DeWolf – guitar, art direction, design, layout
- Phil Lipscomb – bass
- Nick Fredell – drums

Additional

- Tim Patalan – producer, recording
- Andy Patalan – mixing, mastering
- Leah Berman – cover model

== Charts ==
Singles - Billboard (United States)

Year	Single	Chart	Position
April 4, 2012	"No Surrender"	Mainstream Rock Tracks	38
