= Upon Us =

Studio album by Taproot
- Released: May 11, 1999
- Genre: Nu metal; rap metal
- Length: 32:30
- Label: Taproot Sounds
- Producer: Taproot

Taproot chronology
| Mentobe (1998) | Upon Us (1999) | Gift (2000) |

Upon Us is a demo album by American alternative metal band Taproot. It was released on May 11, 1999. This album is notable for featuring highlights of material from their first demo ...Something More Than Nothing and the hard-to-find EP Mentobe.

Upon Us was once released as a "sampler" (titled as Upon Us Sampler) with only "Again & Again", "Believed" and "Fear to See" in a blue cover or a red cover. This was done so fans weren't obligated to buy the full album with the remaining tracks from their EP Mentobe and their first album, ...Something More Than Nothing. Like ...Something More Than Nothing, this album is difficult to find, but often can be found on fan forums, blogs, and torrent sites.

== Track listing ==
| No. | Title | Length |
|---|---|---|
| 1. | "Again & Again" | 3:31 |
| 2. | "Believed" | 4:57 |
| 3. | "Fear to See" | 3:59 |
| 4. | "Shine" | 4:01 |
| 5. | "Mentobe" | 4:03 |
| 6. | "Flatline" | 4:42 |
| 7. | "Comeback" | 3:59 |
| 8. | "Mirror's Reflection" | 3:18 |
| Total length: | | 32:30 |

== Notes ==
- Tracks 1, 2, 5, 7, and 8 were reworked for their major label debut Gift.
- The lyrics to "Fear to See" were used for a remake of the song "Mirror's Reflection".

== Personnel ==
- Stephen Richards – lead vocals
- Mike DeWolf – guitar
- Phil Lipscomb – bass
- Jarrod Montague – drums, backing vocals
