= Welcome (Taproot album) =

Studio album by Taproot
- Released: October 15, 2002
- Recorded: November 2001 – May 2002
- Studio: Cherokee Studios (Los Angeles, California)
- Genres: Alternative metal; nu metal; alternative rock
- Length: 46:44
- Labels: Atlantic; Velvet Hammer
- Producer: Toby Wright

Taproot chronology
Gift (2000)	Welcome (2002)	Blue-Sky Research (2005)

Singles from Welcome
- 1. "Poem" Released: October 14, 2002; 2. "Mine" Released: March 3, 2003

Welcome is the second studio album by American alternative metal band Taproot. It was released on October 15, 2002. "Poem" served as the album's lead single and reached No. 5 on the Mainstream Rock chart, propelling the group to mainstream success. A follow-up single, "Mine," was released and its video was directed by System of a Down bassist Shavo Odadjian. A third single and video was announced for "Art," but Atlantic pulled the plug soon after the announcement, further irking fans who claimed the label was holding Taproot back. Welcome remains Taproot's most successful record, selling over 475,000 copies.

The band performed on the second part of Disturbed's Music as a Weapon Tour in promotion of the album.

== Production ==
During a break in their intense touring schedule in support of their debut album, Gift, Taproot went to Los Angeles to record several demos with Toby Wright. Those tracks were "Poem to Self", "Remain", "Get Me", "When", and "Transparent". Bolstered by their new recordings, the band featured "Poem to Self", "Transparent", and "Get Me" on tour during 2001, with "Poem to Self" soon becoming one of their most popular songs.

During the early development of Welcome, Taproot had given producer Toby Wright roughly 40 complete songs. Wright said that while they were good, the songs were not up to the band's potential, and he forced them to start from scratch. Several earlier tracks were reworked for the album, while the bulk of the material was discarded. Some of the demos include "Can't Believe", "Poem to Self", "Sumtimes", "Remain", "Strive", "Free", "Fort", "Like", "Promise", "When", "Transparent", "Contradiction", "Keep Your Head Up", "Not a Quitter", "Fault", "Get Me", "Can You", "Indecisive", "Myself", and "Dreams". This was initially met with resentment from the band, but they ultimately wrote entirely new songs that they felt show greater maturity. One of the most prominent songs to survive the fresh batch was "Poem," which had seen prior success after being debuted by the band during concerts, such as Ozzfest 2001, and went on to be arguably Taproot's most well known single. Other songs that were refined with Toby Wright from earlier demos include "When", "Fault", "Sumtimes", and "Like". As with many Toby Wright productions, songs throughout Welcome are heavy on multi-tracked vocals and layered guitars.

While many of their early demos were not recorded for this effort, Taproot did re-record "Remain", "Transparent", and "Free" with Toby Wright. Some of these tracks were included on foreign releases of the album as a bonus track as well as the Poem single, and were later posted to the band's official MySpace page. "Remain", however, would remain unreleased until it was included in the band's 2018 boxset Besides.

== Reception ==
Professional ratings
Review scores
Source	Rating
AllMusic	2/5 stars
Blender	2/5 stars
Orlando Sentinel	(favorable)
Q	3/5 stars
Rolling Stone	3/5 stars
Sputnikmusic	2/5 stars

Critical response to Welcome was largely mixed. Various prominent media critics considered the album too mediocre to stand out among current alternative metal and nu metal acts. However, melodic improvements from Taproot's prior effort were also cited. AllMusic's Brian O'Neill also compared the band's stylistic "idolatry" as a shift from Korn to Alice in Chains. Robert Cherry of Rolling Stone cited the "me, me, me" lyrics as evidence of needed maturity but added that Welcome "marks a self-preserving transition from new metal to art metal." The publication also cited Taproot as one of the "Bands to Watch in 2002." CMJ New Music Report described the album as musically being a combination of Korn and Alice in Chains, and they also stated that Stephen Richards "wears vocal inspirations of Mike Patton and Brandon Boyd proudly on his sleeve, reaching high pitches that often toe the line between passionate and whiny."

== Track listing ==
According to the lyric booklet, there are also alternative titles to some of these tracks

No.	Title	Length
1.	"Mine"	3:49
2.	"Poem"	3:09
3.	"Everything"	3:27
4.	"Art"	4:42
5.	"Myself"	3:47
6.	"When"	4:04
7.	"Fault"	3:19
8.	"Sumtimes"	4:29
9.	"Breathe"	4:17
10.	"Like"	4:38
11.	"Dreams"	3:43
12.	"Time"	3:20
Total length:		46:44

The band also recorded three additional songs during the Welcome sessions. Two of them, "Transparent" (4:23) and "Free" (3:23), can both be found on the Poem CD single as B-sides and on the Japanese pressing of Welcome as bonus tracks. The lyrics to "Free" can still be found in the lyric booklet of Welcome The third track, "Remain", would be released with the other two on the 2018 box set Besides.

== Credits ==
Taproot

- Mike DeWolf – guitar
- Phil Lipscomb – bass
- Jarrod Montague – drums
- Stephen Richards – guitar, vocals

Production

- Tom Baker – mastering
- David Benveniste – A&R, executive producer
- Elliott Blakey – engineer
- Steve Sisco – mixing assistant
- Tom Storms – A&R
- Valente Torrez – assistant engineer
- Jeff Turzo – digital programming
- Andy Wallace - mixing
- Toby Wright – engineer, producer

Art direction

- Christina Dittmar
- Taproot

== Charts ==
Album

Chart (2002)	Peak positions
Japanese Albums (Oricon)	210
UK Albums (OCC)	104
UK Rock & Metal Albums (OCC)	11
US Billboard 200	17

Singles - Billboard (North America)

Year	Single	Chart	Peak
2002	"Poem"	Mainstream Rock Tracks	5
2002	"Poem"	Modern Rock Tracks	10
2003	"Mine"	Mainstream Rock Tracks	23
2003	"Mine"	Modern Rock Tracks	26
