= Gift (Taproot album) =

Studio album by Taproot
- Released: June 27, 2000
- Recorded: January–March 2000
- Studio: Master Control Recording in Burbank, Los Angeles, California Larrabee Sound Studios in North Hollywood, California
- Genre: Nu metal
- Length: 43:22
- Label: Atlantic; Velvet Hammer
- Producer: Ulrich Wild; David Benveniste

Taproot chronology
Upon Us (1999)	Gift (2000)	Welcome (2002)

Singles from Gift
- 1. "Again & Again" Released: April 28, 2000; 2. "I" Released: January 20, 2001

Gift is the debut studio album by American alternative metal band Taproot. It was released on June 27, 2000. The singles "Again & Again" and "I" reached No. 39 and No. 34 on the Mainstream Rock chart. The album has sold over 250,000 copies.

== Background, writing and recording ==
Taproot singer Stephen Richards told CMJ New Music Report that the songs on Gift were written in 1997, playing the songs for a few years. He claimed that "Dragged Down" and "Now" were the only songs written specifically for Gift. Taproot spent six weeks working on Gift.

== Music and lyrics ==
Described as a nu metal album, the album's lyrical themes are primarily about topics such as depression and disliking life. Taproot's vocalist Stephen Richards' vocals on the album Gift have been compared to vocalists such as Chino Moreno, Trent Reznor, Jonathan Davis and Mike Patton. The album consists of vocal styles such as singing, rapping, growling and screaming.

== Reception ==
Professional ratings
Review scores
Source	Rating
AllMusic	2.5/5 stars
Alternative Press	3/5 stars
Blabbermouth	8/10
Drowned in Sound	10/10
Kerrang!	5/5 stars
Metal Hammer	6/10
PopMatters	(average)
Rolling Stone	3/5 stars

AllMusic's Brian Musich stated "dropping in a time when rap-rock is all the rage, as it sells albums like mad, garners instant publicity from MTV, and packs stadiums in a new generation of concert festivals, Taproot is guaranteed media exposure and a large built-in fan base." He added, "If they had dropped Gift two years earlier, Taproot would be pioneers. Instead, they are adequate followers." In June 2000, CMJ New Music Monthly called the music "blistering melodic metal" and compared the vocals to Incubus and Faith No More. In her July 2000 review, CMJ New Music Report's Amy Sciarretto wrote that it "sounds like Faith No More engorged with programming or Incubus spiked with more guitar grit." In October 2000, Ben Raynor of Drowned in Sound gave the album a positive review, and praised the vocals of Stephen Richards, writing that, "Taproot are the perfect antidote to rap metal at a time when music needs them."

== Track listing ==
No.	Title	Length
1.	"Smile"	3:34
2.	"Again & Again"	3:55
3.	"Emotional Times"	3:03
4.	"Now"	3:21
5.	"1 Nite Stand"	3:39
6.	"Believed"	4:02
7.	"Mentobe"	3:39
8.	"I"	4:15
9.	"Mirror's Reflection"	3:10
10.	"Dragged Down"	3:30
11.	"Comeback"	4:25
12.	"Impact"	2:49
Total length:		43:22

Japanese edition bonus track
No.	Title	Length
13.	"Day By Day"	3:21
Total length:		46:43

== Notes ==
- Tracks 2, 6, 7, 9 and 11 are re-recordings of early songs the appeared on the demos, "...Something More Than Nothing" and "Upon Us". Both were released in 1998 and 1999.
- A b-side, "Day By Day", can be found on the Dracula 2000 soundtrack, CD single for "Again & Again" and the Japanese release of "Gift". It would later be released as a digital single in 2020 as part of the Warner Bros. Archive series.
- Other b-sides entitled "Thriftwhore", "Strive", and "Get Me" can be found through file-sharing networks. These recordings, along with "Day By Day", would later be officially released on the 2018 boxset Besides.

== Personnel ==
Taproot

- Stephen Richards – vocals, programming
- Mike DeWolf – guitar
- Phil Lipscomb – bass
- Jared Montague – drums

Production

- Tom Baker – digital editing, mastering
- Frank Gryner – assistant mix engineer (1-5, 9, 12)
- Erin Haley – production management
- Scott Humphrey – mixing (1-5, 9, 12)
- Matt Quave – assistant engineer
- Ted Reiger – assistant mix engineer (6-8, 10, 11)
- Edward Smith – photography
- Ulrich Wild – producer, engineer, mixing (6-8, 10, 11)
- Brad Winslow – assistant engineer

== Charts ==
Album

Chart (2000)	Peak position
US Billboard 200	160
US Heatseekers	6

Singles - Billboard (United States)

Year	Single	Chart	Position
2000	"Again & Again"	Mainstream Rock Tracks	39
2001	"I"	Mainstream Rock Tracks	34
