= Susanne Lewis =

German American musician, songwriter and artist

- Born: Susanne Nanett Lewis; Stuttgart, West Germany
- Genres: Indie rock Alternative rock Experimental; Electronica
- Occupations: Composer, guitarist
- Instruments: Guitar, keyboards
- Years active: 1980s–present
- Label: Recommended Records
- Website: susannelewis.com

Susanne Lewis is a German American musician, songwriter and artist. She is a solo artist and a founder or collaborator of a number of bands and music projects. She has a band with Bob Drake called Corpses as Bedmates and Hail, and she also releases music under her own name. She was a member of the band Thinking Plague and has guested on albums by 5uu's (Hunger's Teeth, 1994) and Biota (Object Holder, 1995).

== Discography ==
=== Bands and projects ===
Hail

- 2006 Hello Debris (CD) Recommended Records, U.K.
- 1993 Kirk (CD) Recommended Records, U.K.
- 1991 Turn of the Screw (CD) Recommended Records, U.K.
- 1988 Gypsy Cat & Gypsy Bird (LP) Prolific Records, U.S.
- 1991 RēR Records Quarterly Vol. 3 No.3 (LP) Recommended Records, U.K.

Venus Handcuffs

(Which turned into Hail)

- 1988 Venus Handcuffs Ad Hoc Records CD 2004, U.S.

Thinking Plague

- 2000 Early Plague Years (CD) Cuneiform Records, U.S.
- 1989 In This Life (CD) Recommended Records, U.K.
- 1987 Moonsongs (LP) Dead Man's Curve Records, U.K.
- 1989 RēR Records Quarterly Vol.2 No.4 (LP) Recommended Records, U.K.
- 1994 RēR Quarterly Vol.4 No.1 (CD) Recommended Records, U.K.

Kissyfur

- 1995 Frambuesa (CD) Starlight Furniture Company, U.S.
- 1993 Self-Titled (CD) Funky Mushroom, U.S.

Susanne Lewis

- 2000 Self-Titled (CD) Sedimental, U.S.

Hail/Snail

(a collaboration with Azalia Snail)

- 1994 How to Live with a Tiger (CD) Funky Mushroom, U.S.
- 1993 "Hail/Snail 7" (single) Funky Mushroom, U.S.

Corpses as Bedmates

- 1987 Venus Handcuffs (LP) Dead Man's Curve Records, U.K.

Biota

- 1995 Object Holder (CD) Recommended Records, U.K.

5uu's

- 1994 Hunger's Teeth (CD) Recommended Records, U.K.
