= Taproot (band) =

American metal band

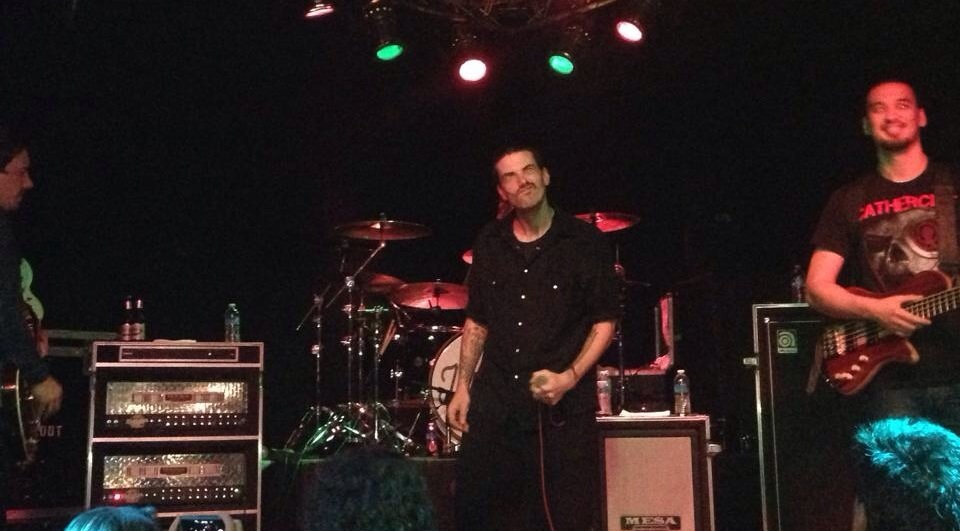
- Taproot in 2013

Background information
- Origin: Ann Arbor, Michigan, U.S.
- Genres: Alternative metal; nu metal; post-grunge; alternative rock
- Works: Taproot discography
- Years active: 1997–present
- Labels: Atlantic; Velvet Hammer/RED Distribution; Victory; THC Music
- Members: Stephen Richards; Phil Lipscomb; Jarrod Montague; Taylor Roberts
- Past members: Dave Coughlin; Nick Fredell; Mike DeWolf; Dave Lizzio

Taproot is an American alternative metal band from Ann Arbor, Michigan, formed in 1997. Its lineup consists of vocalist/guitarist Stephen Richards, bassist Phil Lipscomb, drummer Jarrod Montague, and guitarist Taylor Roberts. They are best known for their hit single "Poem", which peaked at No. 5 on the Mainstream Rock chart in 2002.

Taproot originally consisted of Richards, Lipscomb, Montague, and guitarist Mike DeWolf. After a few independent releases in the late 1990s, they signed to the major label Atlantic Records in 1999. Their debut album on the label, Gift, was released in 2000. Both of the album's singles, "Again & Again" and "I", attained moderate success. Taproot's breakthrough came in 2002 with the album Welcome and its lead single, "Poem", which peaked at No. 5 on the Mainstream Rock chart and No. 10 on the Modern Rock Tracks chart. Welcome sold over 500,000 copies. The release of 2005's Blue-Sky Research produced the single "Calling", which peaked at No. 11 on the Mainstream Rock chart. However, the album did not match its predecessor's success, and Atlantic parted ways with Taproot in 2006.

The band released Our Long Road Home in 2008, which was immediately followed by drummer Montague's departure and the addition of Nick Fredell. Taproot then issued Plead the Fifth in 2010, which featured the moderately successful single "Fractured (Everything I Said Was True)", followed by The Episodes, in 2012. Fredell was replaced on drums by Dave Coughlin in 2013, and guitarist DeWolf was replaced by Dave Lizzio in 2015. The band's seventh album, SC\SSRS, came out in 2023. The record's announcement coincided with the return of Montague on drums and the addition of Roberts on guitar.

== History ==
=== Formation and independent releases (1997–1999) ===
Taproot was formed in 1997 in Ann Arbor, Michigan by vocalist Stephen Richards, guitarist Mike DeWolf, bassist Phil Lipscomb, and drummer Jarrod Montague, and they earned a following with their live performances. They recorded their first demos at Woodshed Studios in Oak Park, Michigan, with Tim Pak. In 1998, Taproot sent their demo to Limp Bizkit frontman, Fred Durst, who offered to get Taproot a contract through Interscope Records. However, Taproot decided to look elsewhere and landed a deal with Atlantic Records. Durst heavily cursed the band on vocalist Richards' answering machine.

"Hey man, you fucked up. You don't ever bite the hand that feeds in this business, bro . . . Took you under my wing, brought you to my house, talked about you on FM radio and press, and you embarrassed me and the Interscope family. Your association with Limp Bizkit doesn't exist. Your manager slings our name around, he's gonna be blackballed and probably be erased, and you will, too. He's a fucking idiot. You're gonna fucking learn from this time right here I hope you let your band know that you just fucked yourself. You need to be associated with somebody in this business, to put you out there and believe in you. Now you got enemies. Don't fucking show up at my shows cause if you do, you're gonna get fucked. You and your fucking punk ass man. You're learning right now exactly how to ruin your career before it gets started. All the luck, brother, fuck you." (The message left by Fred Durst on Stephen Richards' answering machine)

Durst also allegedly blamed System of a Down, who helped Taproot secure the Atlantic deal. It is also alleged that Durst kicked System of a Down off the 1999 Family Values Tour. Overall, Taproot released three independent demos in the late 1990s: ...Something More Than Nothing (1998), the EP Mentobe (1998), and Upon Us (1999).

=== Gift and mainstream success with Welcome (2000–2004) ===
Taproot released their major-label debut album, Gift, on June 27, 2000, through Atlantic Records. The lead single, "Again & Again", gained heavy exposure through MTV2. It was the band's first charting single, peaking at No. 39 on Billboard's Mainstream Rock chart. It also charted at No. 95 on the UK Singles Chart.

With help from Ozzy Osbourne's son Jack, Taproot landed a spot on the second stage of the 2000 and 2001 Ozzfest tours. Gift's second single, "I", reached No. 34 on the Mainstream Rock chart in 2001. Around this time, the band were announced to be contributing a cover of the song "Ricochet" for a Faith No More tribute album, but the project never came to fruition.

After spending seven months in Los Angeles, the band released their second album, Welcome, on October 15, 2002. Considered a more melodic effort, the album debuted at No. 17 on the Billboard 200, selling over 51,000 copies in its first week of release. Much of this was due to the success of the album's first single, "Poem", which shot to No. 5 on the Mainstream Rock chart. "Poem" did not appear on the Billboard Hot 100 but peaked at No. 6 on the Bubbling Under Hot 100 Singles chart. The album's second single, "Mine", followed with moderate success, peaking at No. 23 on the Mainstream Rock chart and at No. 26 on the Alternative Songs chart. Welcome became Taproot's most successful album to date, with over 500,000 copies sold.

After performing across North America on Disturbed's Music as a Weapon Tour as well as in Europe, Taproot took a two-year break from touring.

=== Blue-Sky Research and departure from Atlantic (2005–2006) ===
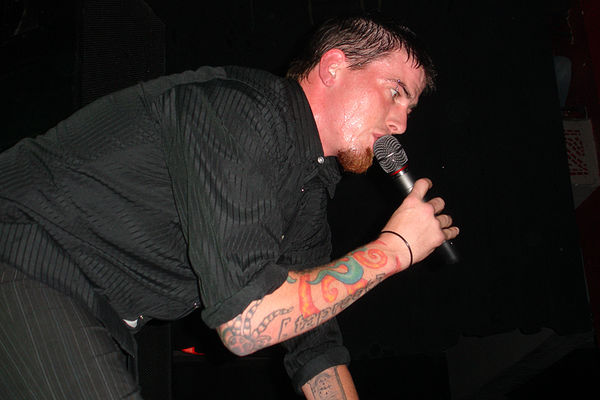
Stephen Richards in 2005

Returning from their hiatus, Taproot released their third major-label studio album, Blue-Sky Research, on August 16, 2005. Billy Corgan of Smashing Pumpkins assisted in songwriting on the album, which was produced by Toby Wright. It debuted at No. 33 on the Billboard 200, with approximately 28,000 first-week sales. The lead single, "Calling", (co-written by Jonah Matranga), was used by WWE as the theme song for the 2005 pay-per-view Unforgiven. It also peaked at No. 11 on the Mainstream Rock chart and at No. 23 on the Alternative Songs chart.

Taproot acted as direct support to Chevelle alongside Thirty Seconds to Mars. The band then headlined a major tour with Evans Blue and From Satellite to promote the album's release. Taproot also participated in the Fall Brawl Tour, which featured Staind and P.O.D. as headliners and was notable for taking the then-unknown Flyleaf along as the opening act for the three bands.

On May 23, 2006, it was reported that Taproot had parted ways with Atlantic Records after disappointing sales of Blue-Sky Research. At the time, the album had sold 112,000 copies since its release.

=== Our Long Road Home and Montague's departure (2007–2009) ===
On March 5, 2007, Taproot confirmed that they were in the process of recording their fourth album, entitled Our Long Road Home, with producer Tim Patalan. On March 2, 2008, the band released the song "You're Not Home Tonight" on their website.

According to the Taproot website, the band decided to forgo signing to a major label. The album would be released independently through their management firm, Velvet Hammer Music, in a 50/50 partnership with the band itself; however, distribution was handled by Sony-owned RED Music. Our Long Road Home was released on September 16, 2008. Just over a week after it was issued, Taproot announced that longtime drummer Montague would be leaving the band, to be replaced by Nick Fredell. They released a statement regarding the change in lineup:

"After 10 years of touring, our drummer and good friend Jarrod will be sitting out this cycle and we will be replacing him with our long time friend Nick Fredell. We'll miss Jarrod's presence out on the road, but Nick has fit in perfectly and we're excited for all of our fans to meet him. Jarrod's still very much a part of our family, so you'll be seeing him in press and the 'Wherever I Stand' video which is out now on Youtube..."

Taproot toured with Sevendust and Dear Enemy around this time. Our Long Road Home's lead single, "Wherever I Stand", ultimately peaked at No. 34 on the Mainstream Rock chart. In the spring of 2009, Taproot went on the road with Dear Enemy and Adakain for the Take It! tour. Later that year, they co-headlined a US tour with Cold.

=== Plead the Fifth and The Episodes (2010–2012) ===
After a brief period without a record label, Taproot signed with Victory Records. On April 1, 2010, the band released the lead single from the then-upcoming album, "Fractured (Everything I Said Was True)". It peaked at No. 18 on the Mainstream Rock chart. A video followed, debuting on the band's YouTube channel on April 16. Soon after, the band released their fifth studio album, Plead the Fifth. Taproot promoted Plead the Fifth with a headlining run in the summer of 2010, with support from Ice Nine Kills and label-mates Destrophy.

In September 2011, Taproot announced they were preparing to record their sixth studio album, working with producer Patalan once again and recording at the Loft Studios in Saline, Michigan. On December 15, the band announced that the album was recorded and should be released in the spring of 2012. On January 8, 2012, Taproot's official website was closed and re-launched as a brand new one on February 7, 2012. In addition to the new site, the band also revealed their sixth album's title, The Episodes. During the following weeks, Taproot offered a video every Tuesday about their upcoming album. On March 2, 2012, they issued the first single, titled "No Surrender". It peaked at No. 38 on the Mainstream Rock chart. The Episodes was then released on April 10, 2012.

In an October 14 interview, Richards spoke candidly about his bout with seizures and how his medical issues had affected touring and onstage performances. Taproot supported The Episodes by gigging with Nonpoint and headlining the Winter Riot Tour (with 12 Stones, Digital Summer, 3 Pill Morning, and Prospect Hill).

=== Anniversary shows, lineup changes, and Besides (2013–2020) ===
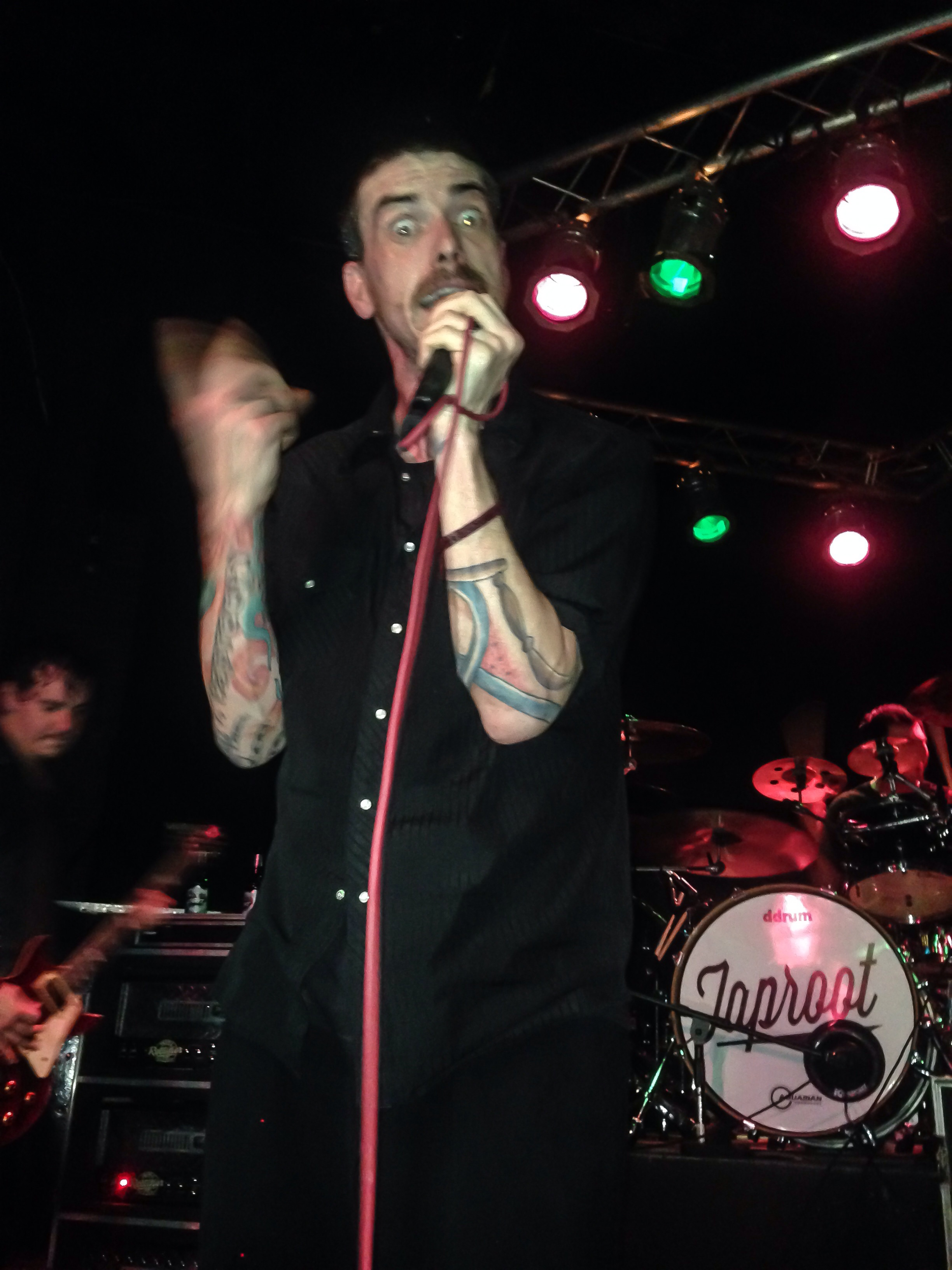
Taproot performing in 2013

The first half of 2013 saw Taproot playing their major label debut album, Gift, in its entirety on tour with Boy Hits Car and Intertwined. On June 16, 2013, drummer Fredell announced on his Twitter account that he had departed the band, citing "some bad blood". He was replaced by Dave Coughlin. The band did not issue an official statement addressing the lineup change.

On July 9, 2015, a statement was released by Lipscomb, stating that DeWolf was not interested in continuing with the band. A replacement on lead guitar was not immediately named.

On August 4, 2015, the Alice in Chains book Alice in Chains: The Untold Story was released, and it mentioned an unfinished collaboration between original frontman Layne Staley and Taproot. Just prior to his death from an overdose, Staley was set to record vocals for a Taproot song that was written for their 2002 album, Welcome. The "spacey-sounding" track, initially named "Kevin Spacey", would ultimately remain instrumental.

On August 8, 2015, Taproot played at Dirt Fest in Birch Run, Michigan, with Dave Lizzio, formerly of Nonpoint, as the band's guitarist. The performance was also notable for its guest appearance of founding member Montague on drums. It was the band's first show since the departure of DeWolf.

On September 6, 2016, Taproot announced that they would be releasing a rarities collection entitled Besides.

On February 27, 2017, they announced on Banana 101.5 that they would play their second album Welcome in its entirety. Original drummer Montague also appeared at the anniversary concert, along with his band WestFall as the opening act. Taproot performed on May 13 and 14, 2017, at the Machine Shop in Flint, Michigan. During the concert, they premiered a new song entitled "No One Else to Blame".

On October 16, 2017, the band announced a twentieth-anniversary show and performed on December 23 at Token Lounge in Westland, Michigan. Montague played drums on older songs, while Coughlin performed more recent material. The compilation Besides was released as an eight-disc, 130-track box set in December 2018.

=== SC\SSRS (2021–present) ===
In 2021, it was reported that Richards was working on new music. A condensed version of Besides, titled Best of Besides, was announced in early 2023, with a release date of April 30, 2023. A double-LP vinyl was also set to come out later that same year. The compilation contained remastered versions of eighteen tracks from the Besides box set.

In February 2023, Taproot announced that they would be releasing a new album, titled SC\SSRS, on September 29. The album ultimately became their first studio release since 2012's The Episodes.

The first single from SC\SSRS, titled "V\CT\M \ PLAY", was released on April 6, 2023. The band stated that Montague had rejoined the lineup, although Coughlin planned on playing sporadic one-off shows in Montague's absence. In addition, it was announced that Taylor Roberts had replaced Lizzio on guitar.

In 2023 interviews, Richards stated that his health issues were a reason for the extended period of inactivity for the band, which led to a delayed release of the new album. On August 9, 2023, Taproot issued the single "No One Else to Blame". Another track, "Favourite Song", came out in September. SC\SSRS was officially released on September 29 via the independent label THC Music, coinciding with a US tour in support of the album. The aforementioned vinyl version of Best of Besides was released on the following day.

== Musical style and influences ==
Taproot's musical style has been described as combining "heavy riffs and lyrics, with an almost hypnotically melodic sound". Associated genres have included nu metal and post-grunge, along with the broader tags of alternative metal and alternative rock. Some of the bands that have influenced Taproot's sound include Pearl Jam, Alice in Chains, Primus, Soundgarden, Sepultura, Faith No More, Pantera, Slayer, Metallica, Mötley Crüe, Duran Duran, Def Leppard, Van Halen, and Rush. Their music has been compared to Deftones, Fugazi, Helmet, Korn, and Tool.

== Band members ==
Current

- Stephen Richards – lead vocals, rhythm guitar (1997–present)
- Phil Lipscomb – bass (1997–present)
- Jarrod Montague – drums, backing vocals (1997–2008, 2023–present) (Note: Live guest appearances in 2013, 2015, and 2017.)
- Taylor Roberts – lead guitar, backing vocals (2023–present)

Past

- Mike DeWolf – lead guitar (1997–2015)
- Nick Fredell – drums (2008–2013)
- Dave Coughlin – drums (2013–2023; touring 2023)
- Dave Lizzio – lead guitar (2015–2023)

Timeline

== Discography ==
- Gift (2000)
- Welcome (2002)
- Blue-Sky Research (2005)
- Our Long Road Home (2008)
- Plead the Fifth (2010)
- The Episodes (2012)
- SC\SSRS (2023)

== See also ==
- List of alternative metal bands
