= Blue-Sky Research =

Studio album by Taproot
- Released: August 16, 2005
- Recorded: October 2004 – January 2005
- Studio: Track Record Studios (North Hollywood, California)
- Genre: Post-grunge; alternative metal; nu metal; hard rock; alternative rock
- Length: 51:35
- Label: Atlantic; Velvet Hammer
- Producer: Toby Wright

Taproot chronology
Welcome (2002)	Blue-Sky Research (2005)	Our Long Road Home (2008)

Singles from Blue-Sky Research
- 1. "Calling" Released: June 27, 2005; 2. "Birthday" Released: 2005

Blue-Sky Research is the third studio album by American alternative metal band Taproot. It was released on August 15, 2005 internationally and a day later in the United States. Smashing Pumpkins frontman Billy Corgan co-wrote three songs on the album. Jonah Matranga from Far and Onelinedrawing co-wrote "Calling". The band wrote over 80 songs for the effort. "Calling" was released as the first single and reached No. 11 on the Mainstream Rock chart, while the second single, "Birthday", reached No. 39. It is Taproot's last album with Atlantic Records, as both parties had decided to part ways. It has a more melodic sound compared to the band's two previous albums, and sold over 150,000 copies in the U.S.

== Critical reception ==
Professional ratings
Review scores
Source	Rating
AbsolutePunk	(86%)
AllMusic	2.5/5 stars
Blender	2/5 stars
Rolling Stone	2/5 stars

Blue-Sky Research garnered mixed reviews from music critics who admired the genre shift and lush production but found it wasted with angst-filled lyrics. Corey Hoffy of AbsolutePunk praised the album for Wright's stellar production, the band's controlled instrumentation and Richards's lyrics approaching close to political territory, concluding that "this remains their most complex and best album to date." Vik Bansal of musicOMH praised the band for taking a melodic approach to the record along with their standard nu-metal formula, concluding that "Depending on your point of view, Blue-Sky Research will either come across as hopelessly unfocused or else one of the more ambitious and versatile rock albums to emerge for quite a while. With the consistent strength of the tunes here, I lean towards the latter." Johnny Loftus of AllMusic found the self-deprecating lyrics formulaic at times but found the contributions of Corgan and Matranga to the record a nice addition to the band's improved musicianship, saying that "even without the hired guns Blue-Sky Research is the most dynamic Taproot album yet (the self-penned "So Eager" proves that), and the album's heightened textures and less predictable turns successfully updates the band's sound." Rolling Stone's Christian Hoard said that despite the band adding elements of modern rock and electronica to its brand of nu-metal, the album's songs get "dragged down by melodrama and the kind of adenoidal choruses that Incubus do much better." Mikael Wood, writing for Blender, felt that the band was starting to become a relic of its given genre, saying that "On their third album, their lean Everydude grind—processed guitars stacked atop booming arena-rock drums—probes their feelings of insignificance in an all-too-workmanlike fashion."

== Track listing ==
All tracks are written by Jarrod Montague, Mike DeWolf, Philip Lipscomb and Stephen Richards. Cowriters are noted.

No.	Title	Length
1.	"I Will Not Fall for You"	3:01
2.	"Violent Seas" (B. Corgan)	3:45
3.	"Birthday" (B. Marlette)	4:29
4.	"Facepeeler"	4:49
5.	"Calling" (J. Matranga)	3:53
6.	"Forever Endeavor" (B. Marlette)	4:04
7.	"April Suits"	3:27
8.	"Lost in the Woods" (B. Corgan)	4:14
9.	"So Eager"	4:00
10.	"She" (B. Marlette)	3:25
11.	"Promise" (B. Corgan)	3:35
12.	"Nightmare"	4:02
13.	"Blue-Sky Research/What's Left"	4:42
Total length:		51:35

Japanese Bonus Track
No.	Title	Length
14.	"Stay Away"	3:19

== Notes ==
- "Calling" was released in late 2005. It was used by the WWE as the theme song for their Unforgiven pay-per-view event in 2005.
  - Received radio airplay on June 27, 2005.
  - Music video premiered on MTV.com.
- Another song titled "Who's to Say" was recorded during the Blue-Sky Research sessions but was not included because of record politics. Stephen Richards was hoping for it to be a single, but was disappointed that it did not make the final cut. The song was, however, available for download on the band's official MySpace page for a limited time, and would later be included on the band's boxset Besides in 2018.
- "Facepeeler" was supposed to be the band's third single, but because of record politics and poor album sales, it did not make it as a single. However, the band did have a contest for fans to create a music video.

== Credits ==
Credits for Blue-Sky Research adapted from AllMusic.

Taproot

- Mike DeWolf - Art conception, composer, design direction, guitar
- Philip Lipscomb - Bass, composer
- Jarrod Montague - Composer, drums
- Stephen Richards - Composer, guitar, vocals

Production

- Keith Armstrong - Assistant engineer
- Elliott Blakey - Engineer
- Trevor Cole - Guitar technician
- Lanre Gaba - Artist coordination
- Eric Hackett - Drum technician
- Dmitar Krnjaic - Assistant engineer
- Chris Lord-Alge - Mixing
- Vlado Meller - Mastering
- Craig Rosen - Artist coordination
- Mindy Ryu - Layout design
- Mark Santangelo - Assistant
- Tom Storms - A&R
- Nitin Vadukul - Photography
- Mark Wakefield - A&R
- Toby Wright - Engineer, producer

== Charts ==
Album - Billboard (North America)

Year	Chart	Position
2005	The Billboard 200	#33

Singles - Billboard (North America)

Year	Single	Chart	Position
2005	"Calling"	Mainstream Rock Tracks	#11
2005	"Calling"	Modern Rock Tracks	#23
2005	"Birthday"	Mainstream Rock Tracks	#39
