= Velvet Hammer =

Studio album by Scrawl
- Released: November 8, 1993
- Length: 37:11
- Label: Simple Machines
- Producer: Steve Albini

Scrawl chronology
Smallmouth (1990)	Velvet Hammer (1993)	Travel On, Rider (1996)

Velvet Hammer is a studio album by the American band Scrawl, released in November 1993 by Simple Machines.

== Critical reception ==
Professional ratings
Review scores
Source	Rating
AllMusic	4.5/5 stars
The Encyclopedia of Popular Music	3/5 stars
Entertainment Weekly	A−
Hot Press	11/12
Kerrang!	3/5 stars
NME	7/10
Sputnikmusic	4.5/5

The New York Times wrote: "The music is sparse but strong; Marcy Mays's guitar and Sue Harshe's bass sometimes stand apart, sometimes mesh for buzzing riffs."

== Track listing ==
All lyrics are written by Marcy Mays, except where noted; all music is composed by Scrawl, except where noted.

No.	Title	Lyrics	Music	Length
1.	"Your Mother Wants to Know"		Marcy Mays	3:20
2.	"Take a Swing"	Mays; Sue Harshe		3:54
3.	"Disappear Without a Trace"		Mays	6:10
4.	"See"	Harshe	Harshe	3:17
5.	"Face Down"	Mays; Harshe		4:00
6.	"Tell Me Now, Boy"		Mays	3:07
7.	"Drunken Fool"			3:45
8.	"Prize"	Mays; Harshe		2:41
9.	"Blue Green Sea"		Mays	2:50
10.	"Remember That Day"			3:59

== Personnel ==
Personnel per liner notes.

Scrawl

- Marcy Mays – guitar, vocals
- Sue Harshe – bass, vocals
- Dana Marshall – drums

Additional musicians

- Steve Albini – additional guitars

Technical

- Steve Albini – production
- Scrawl – engineer
