= Dave Willey =

American experimental musician and composer (born 1963)

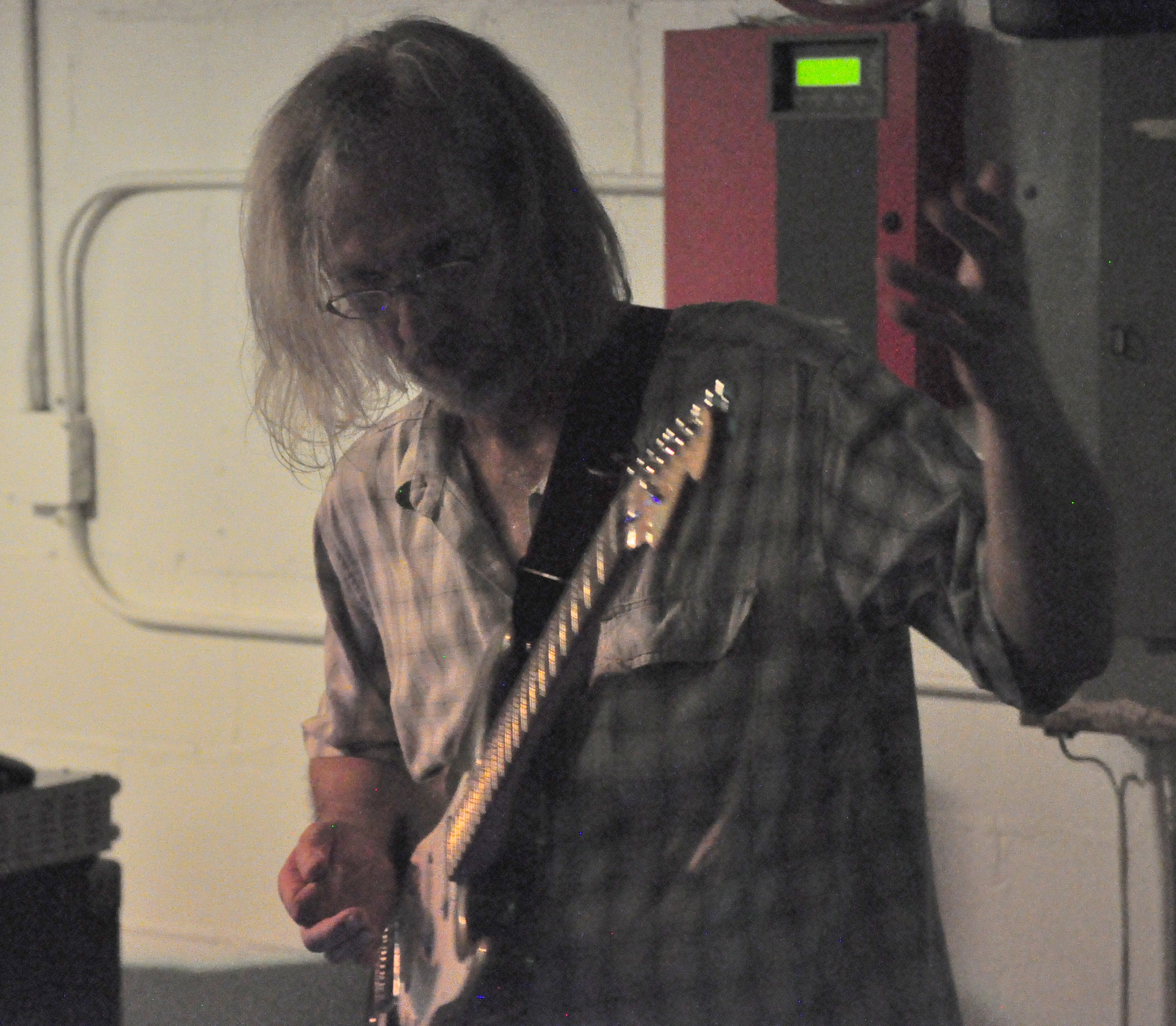
- Willey with Thinking Plague at the 19th Olympic Experimental Music Festival, Olympia, Washington, June 2013

Background information
- Born: 1963 (age 62–63); United States
- Genres: Avant-rock, experimental
- Occupations: Musician, composer
- Instruments: Accordion, bass guitar, guitar, keyboards
- Years active: 1980s–present
- Labels: Prolific, Altrock
- Formerly of: Hamster Theatre, Thinking Plague, 3 Mice

Dave Willey (born 1963) is an American experimental musician and composer, best known as the co-founder and member of the Boulder, Colorado-based avant-rock group Hamster Theatre. He is also a member of Thinking Plague and 3 Mice. He has released two solo albums and has performed with Hamster Theatre and Thinking Plague in the United States and Europe.

In a biography at AllMusic, Dave Lynch described Willey's music as "uncompromising, challenging, and adventurous but also engaging and tuneful".

== Biography ==
Dave Willey was born in 1963 and grew up in Oregon. He moved to Colorado where he played in several bands, including The Denver Gentlemen and Big Foot Torso. Willey's early influences were twentieth-century classical music, and bands and musicians like Henry Cow, Fred Frith and Thinking Plague. In the early 1990s, Willey lived in Europe for a few years where he exposed himself to Rock in Opposition and related music. There he was particularly drawn to the music of Swedish accordionist Lars Hollmer from Samla Mammas Manna. Willey said that initially he "didn't play anything but improvised music", and "wouldn't play anything that was composed or in a time signature or with a melody". But after listening to European music, he found himself liking melodic music, and realized that "there's nothing wrong with being accessible. You can be accessible and interesting and challenging all at the same time, hopefully." While in Europe, Willey began composing his own music and recording it on tape. When he returned to the United States, Willey settled near Boulder and set to work on his recordings. He added keyboards, accordion, guitar, bass guitar and percussion, and created a cassette tape entitled Songs from the Hamster Theatre. Willey had intended giving the cassette to friends for Christmas, but Prolific Records in Denver expressed interest in releasing it on CD. Dave Lynch at AllMusic called the album, released in 1995, a blend of "rock, European folk, avant-garde experimentation, and modern composition".

In 1993, fellow musician Jon Stubbs from The Denver Gentlemen and Big Foot Torso teamed up with Willey, and with several other musicians, formed Hamster Theatre to play Hollmer covers and songs from Willey's album. In 1996, Willey also joined Thinking Plague, a Denver-based avant-rock group as bass guitarist, and guitarist Mike Johnson and reed player Mark Harris from Thinking Plague, also joined Hamster Theatre. Willey appears on three Thinking Plague albums, In Extremis (1998), A History of Madness (2003), and Decline and Fall (2012), and toured the United States and Europe with them. Willey made three albums with Hamster Theatre, Siege on Hamburger City (1998), Carnival Detournement (2001) and The Public Execution of Mister Personality / Quasi Day Room: Live at the Moore Theatre (2006), and performed with them at several festivals, including Progman Cometh in Seattle, Washington in 2002.

While on tour with Thinking Plague in Switzerland in 2008, Willey and Thinking Plague's vocalist Elaine DiFalco met and formed a group with Swiss multi-instrumentalist Cédric Vuille. The trio, called 3 Mice, collaborated long-distance between Boulder and Geneva and released an album, Send Me a Postcard in 2011. Also in 2011 Willey released Immeasurable Currents, an album that drew on texts from his father, Dale Willey's book of poetry, The Tin Box Papers and Other Poems. The book had been published in 2001, the year he died. Immeasurable Currents, which Willey said took "a million years" to finish, also featured a number of musicians, including Johnson, DiFalco, drummer Dave Kerman from the 5uu's, and bassist Hugh Hopper from Soft Machine (who died in 2009).

== Solo discography ==
- Songs from the Hamster Theatre (1995, CD, Prolific)
- Immeasurable Currents (2011, CD, AltrOck)

Source: AllMusic

== Film appearances ==
- Romantic Warriors II: A Progressive Music Saga About Rock in Opposition
- Romantic Warriors II: Special Features DVD
