= The Public Execution of Mister Personality / Quasi Day Room: Live at the Moore Theatre =

Studio album / live album by Hamster Theatre
- Released: May 23, 2006
- Recorded: August 2002 (live set)
- Venue: The Moore Theatre/Progman Cometh Festival
- Genre: Avant-rock, experimental, folk jazz
- Length: 103:25
- Label: Cuneiform Records

Hamster Theatre chronology
Carnival Detournement (1998)	The Public Execution of Mister Personality / Quasi Day Room: Live at the Moore Theatre (2006)

The Public Execution of Mister Personality / Quasi Day Room: Live at the Moore Theatre is a 2006 double album by Boulder, Colorado-based avant-rock, experimental and folk jazz music group Hamster Theatre, led by Dave Willey. It was released in the United States by Cuneiform Records, and consists of a studio CD (The Public Execution of Mister Personality) and a live CD (Quasi Day Room: Live at the Moore Theatre), the latter recorded at the 2002 Progman Cometh Festival in Seattle, Washington.

The studio disc contains new material, while the live disc includes music from Hamster Theatre's earlier albums, Carnival Detournement and Siege on Hamburger City, and Willey's solo album, Songs from the Hamster Theatre. Both CDs were mixed and mastered by Bob Drake.

== Reception ==
Professional ratings
Review scores
Source	Rating
All About Jazz	5/5 stars
AllMusic	4.5/5 stars
Musique Machine	4.5/5 stars

John Kelman wrote at All About Jazz that on this album, Hamster Theatre does more than "dissolv[e] artificial boundaries between musical styles", they "just plain nuke them". He said they make liberal use of counterpoint, and their music "is a complex intertwining of themes and influences", including Swedish accordionist Lars Hollmer, Erik Satie, Captain Beefheart, Frank Zappa and RIO groups Henry Cow and Univers Zero. Kelman described the album as "a challenging but evocative and completely enthralling listen".

In a review at AllMusic, Dave Lynch called the album "a landmark two-disc studio/live set proving that the European RIO-based sounds of the '70s and '80s have taken root and can sprout up almost anywhere, even in the post-millennial Rocky Mountain State". He said the music has "the complexity and technical skill of prog rock and includes occasional startling intrusions of abrasive textures and experimental noise", but added that Willey's accordion introduces "an appealing European folk melodicism mixed with a classicist's sense of composition".

A reviewer at Musique Machine described the album as "thoroughly entertaining", and added that the tracks on the studio disc "reveal an imaginative mind" with "a strong theatrical aspect", while the live disc is "energetic" and "shed[s] a different light" on the studio set.

== Track listing ==
All tracks by Dave Willey, except where noted.

CD 1: The Public Execution of Mister Personality
No.	Title	Length
1.	"Race Against Time" (Jon Stubbs)	4:17
2.	"162"	4:17
3.	"We Unearth the Lost Book of Mister Personality, and its Consequences"	2:30
4.	"Reddy 4 Luv"	3:44
5.	"The Quasi Day Room Ceremonial Quadrille" (Mark Harris, Willey)	2:46
6.	"Love Theme From 'All Clytemnestra on the Western Front' "	1:51
7.	"Oye Comatose" (Mike Johnson)	6:55
8.	"Litost"	4:26
9.	"La Sacre D'Merde"	2:59
10.	"The Quasi Day Room Ceremonial Tango"	1:29
11.	"The Fairytale in Reverse"	4:28
12.	"Phoenix" (Stubbs)	4:25
13.	"It Was Only a Dream"	2:52
Total length:		46:59

CD 2: Quasi Day Room: Live at the Moore Theatre
No.	Title	Length
1.	"Bean Dance" (Willey, Deborah Perry)	4:47
2.	"The Cat Song"	3:05
3.	"Bur Di Lie Town So" (Harris, Willey, Johnson)	6:27
4.	"Jeanne-Marie"	3:35
5.	"Bug 2: The History of the United States of America" (Willey, Stubbs)	4:12
6.	"Vermilion Hue Over Lake Lausanne" (Willey, Helena Winkerman)	6:17
7.	"Tick Fever" (Stubbs)	2:41
8.	"Vand Vang"	5:04
9.	"Home"	3:56
10.	"The 5" (Stubbs)	2:49
11.	"Hamster Dance"	4:23
12.	"The Bug Show" (Stubbs)	4:29
13.	"Cat 2: Siege on Hamburger City"	4:41
Total length:		56:26

Source: AllMusic, Discogs.

== Personnel ==
- Dave Willey – accordion, bass guitar, bells, cymbals, drums, guitar, guitarron, handclapping, harmonium, keyboards, organ, percussion, piano, electric piano, prepared piano, shaker, ukulele, violin, vocals, whistling
- Jon Stubbs – bass guitar, glockenspiel, keyboards, percussion, trombone
- Mike Johnson – guitar, lap steel guitar, mandolin, banjo, fretless banjo, percussion
- Mark Harris – clarinet, bass clarinet, flute, reeds, saxophone, percussion, vocals
- Raoul Rossiter – drums, marimba, percussion
- Matt Spencer – bass guitar (CD 1)
- Brian McDougall – bass guitar (CD 2)
- Emily Bowman – viola (CD 1)

Source: AllMusic, Discogs.

== Recording notes ==
- CD 1 recorded at The Tar Paper Shack, The Rendezvous, The Detroiter, Stubbsonic, Mike's Dank Cellar, September School, Alexander Dawson School and Brave New Audio
- CD 2 recorded live at The Moore Theatre/Progman Cometh Festival, August 2002, Seattle, Washington
- Dave Willey – engineer
- Jon Stubbs – engineer
- Mike Johnson – engineer
- Mark McCoin – engineer
- Brian McDougall – engineer
- Bob Drake – mixing, mastering

Source: AllMusic.
