= Blown Apart =

Blown Apart or blown apart may refer to:

- Total body disruption caused by a powerful explosion, uncontrolled decompression or implosion
- "Blown Apart", a song by Thinking Plague
- "Blown Apart", a song by Bass Outlaws
- Blown Apart, an alternate title for the 2008 film Incendiary
- "Blown Apart", an episode of Walker, Texas Ranger
