= Angels on the Edge of Time =

Live album by Lindsay Cooper, Fred Frith, Gianni Gebbia and Lars Hollmer
- Released: 1 January 2015
- Recorded: 30 May 1992
- Venues: AngelicA Festival Internazionale di Musica, Bologna, Italy
- Genres: Experimental music, free improvisation
- Length: 38:50
- Label: I Dischi di Angelica (Italy)
- Producer: Massimo Simonini

Fred Frith chronology
Clearing Customs (2011)	Angels on the Edge of Time (2015)	Field Days (The Amanda Loops) (2015)

Angels on the Edge of Time is a 2015 collaborative live album of musical improvisations by Lindsay Cooper, Fred Frith, Gianni Gebbia and Lars Hollmer. It was recorded on 30 May 1992 at the AngelicA Festival Internazionale di Musica in Bologna, Italy, and released by I Dischi di Angelica in January 2015. This is the only album released by the quartet.

== Background ==
The quartet of Cooper and Frith from Henry Cow, Hollmer from Samla Mammas Manna, and free improvising saxophonist Gebbia came about at the suggestion of Massimo Simonini, director of the AngelicA Festival for its 1992 event. Frith said it was a combination that he would never have thought of, but once they were on stage, "it made perfect sense". The quartet never performed again, and it was the last time Frith played with Cooper. Hollmer and Cooper died in 2008 and 2013, respectively.

In the album's liner notes Frith reflected on Cooper and Hollmer's demise, calling them "two ... influential, passionate people" who "revel[ed] in the joy of making music" despite the hardships and setbacks they faced. Frith described the quartet's AngelicA performance as "a unique occasion", and said he was "happy and touched" by the release of this album as it reminded him of "a very special moment".

== Reception ==
Professional ratings
Review scores
Source	Rating
All About Jazz	2.5/5 stars

In a review in All About Jazz, Italian music critic Alberto Bazzurro wrote that Angels on the Edge of Time is an important, "historical" document that highlights Lindsay Cooper's relevance as an improvisor 24 years ago. Bazzurro felt that while not too much happens in this impromptu performance, the first half of the CD is interesting, in particular the third, three-part track, "Elegy for an Angel", which he said is nicely structured.

== Track listing ==
All tracks composed by Lindsay Cooper, Fred Frith, Gianni Gebbia and Lars Hollmer.

No.	Title	Length
1.	"Retorisk Fråga"	6:21
2.	"The Fountain and the Mirror"	8:54
3.	"Elegy for an Angel (Fantasia / Memorativa / Imaginativa)"	4:46
4.	"Mathesis"	7:30
5.	"Indiscrezione"	2:57
6.	"Conversazione (We Fall)"	6:19
7.	"Audience / Applause"	2:01

Sources: Liner notes, Discogs, AllMusic.

== Personnel ==
- Lindsay Cooper – sopranino saxophone, bassoon, electronics
- Fred Frith – electric guitar, violin, radio, harmonica, voice
- Gianni Gebbia – alto saxophone, sopranino saxophone, bird calls, voice
- Lars Hollmer – accordion, melodica, keyboard, voice

Sources: Liner notes, Discogs.

=== Sound and artwork ===
Recorded by Roberto Monari at AngelicA Festival Internazionale di Musica, Aula Absidale di S. Lucia, Bologna, Italy, 30 May 1992; mastered by Bob Drake at Studio Midi-Pyrénées, La Borde Basse, Caudeval, France, November 2014.

- Massimo Simonini – executive producer
- Fred Frith – liner notes
- Concetta Nasone – design, cover art
- Massimo Golfieri – design, cover art
- Gianni Gosdan – concert photographs

Sources: Liner notes, Discogs.
