= Hamster Theatre =

American avant-rock group

- Origin: Boulder, Colorado, US
- Genres: Avant-rock; experimental; folk jazz
- Years active: 1993–present
- Labels: Cuneiform Records
- Members: Dave Willey; Jon Stubbs; Raoul Rossiter; Mike Johnson; Mark Harris; John Grigsby
- Past members: Deborah Perry; Steve Doyle; Greg LaLiberte; Josh Wright; Jay Trolinger; Mark McCoin; Mike Fitzmaurice; Brian McDougall; Matt Spencer; Eric Thorin
- Website: www.hamstertheatre.com

Hamster Theatre is an American avant-rock, experimental, and folk jazz music group based in Boulder, Colorado. It is led by composer and multi-instrumentalist Dave Willey. The band has released three albums and has performed at various festivals, including Progman Cometh and ProgDay.

Hamster Theatre's music is based on European Rock in Opposition and is influenced by many sources, including Lars Hollmer, Erik Satie, Captain Beefheart, Frank Zappa, and Henry Cow. In a biography on AllMusic, Dave Lynch wrote that the band "conjur[es] up beauty, magic, mystery, unpredictability, and manic energy and humor".

== Biography ==
Hamster Theatre was formed in 1993 by multi-instrumentalists Dave Willey and Jon Stubbs. Both had previously been members of Big Foot Torso, but Willey left to spend time in Europe where he experienced Rock in Opposition and related music. Willey was particularly drawn to the music of Swedish accordionist Lars Hollmer from Samla Mammas Manna. When he returned to the United States, Willey recorded a solo album entitled Songs from the Hamster Theatre, which he released on cassette tape (later reissued on CD in 1995).

Stubbs then joined forces with Willey and they formed Hamster Theatre, with an initial lineup of Willey (keyboards, guitar, melodeon), Stubbs (bass guitar), Deborah Perry (keyboards, vocals), Steve Doyle (guitar), Greg LaLiberte (saxophones, flute), Josh Wright (drums) and Jay Trolinger (percussion). The group played Hollmer covers and songs from Willey's album at venues across Colorado. Their first performance was on August 20, 1993, at the Penny Lane coffeehouse in Boulder, Colorado.

Hamster Theatre underwent several personnel changes, which included the departures of Doyle, Wright, and Trolinger, and the addition of Mark McCoin as the new drummer. During this time, Willey and Stubbs expanded their repertoire by incorporating accordion and trombone, respectively. In 1996 Willey (on bass guitar) and Perry (as a vocalist) joined Thinking Plague, an avant-rock group based in Denver. Consequently, Mike Johnson (guitar) and Mark Harris (reeds) of Thinking Plague joined Hamster Theatre.

In 1998, a new lineup of Hamster Theatre consisting of Willey (accordion), Stubbs (trombone), Johnson (guitar), Harris (reeds), Mike Fitzmaurice (bass guitar) and Raoul Rossiter (drums) recorded their first album, Siege on Hamburger City, live at Mercury Café in Denver. The band's subsequent album, Carnival Detournement, was released in 2001. It was a studio album featuring Willey and Stubbs on multiple instruments, alongside Harris, Johnson, Fitzmaurice, Rossiter, LaLiberte and McCoin. Carnival Detournement received favorable reviews from critics "for its melodic, atmospheric, moody, and unpredictable blend of modern classical, avant rock, and European folk influences."

In August 2002, Hamster Theatre performed at the first Progman Cometh festival in Seattle, Washington. The same lineup was used as for Siege on Hamburger City, except for Brian McDougall replacing Fitzmaurice on bass guitar. Most of their performance, with mixing and mastering by Bob Drake, appears on the second CD of their double-CD, The Public Execution of Mister Personality / Quasi Day Room: Live at the Moore Theatre, released in 2006. The first CD of the album consists of studio recordings of compositions by Willey and Stubbs, also mixed and mastered by Drake. A reviewer at AllMusic called the album "a landmark two-disc studio/live set proving that the European RIO-based sounds of the '70s and '80s have taken root and can sprout up almost anywhere, even in the post-millennial Rocky Mountain State."

Further bassist changes in Hamster Theatre took place in the 2000s, with Matt Spencer replacing McDougall, Eric Thorin replacing Spencer, and John Grigsby replacing Thorin. Hamster Theatre performed at ProgDay in North Carolina in September 2006, and appeared in the documentary Romantic Warriors II: A Progressive Music Saga About Rock in Opposition (2012), and the companion Romantic Warriors II: Special Features DVD (2013), where they were filmed performing at the Alexander Dawson Arts School in Colorado in 2011.

== Discography ==
- Siege on Hamburger City (1998, CD, Cricetus)
- Carnival Detournement (2001, CD, Cuneiform Records)
- The Public Execution of Mister Personality / Quasi Day Room: Live at the Moore Theatre (2006, 2xCD, Cuneiform Records)

Source: AllMusic

== Film appearances ==
- Romantic Warriors II: A Progressive Music Saga About Rock in Opposition
- Romantic Warriors II: Special Features DVD
