= The Science Group =

French avant-rock group

- Origin: France
- Genres: Experimental rock, avant-garde jazz, contemporary classical
- Years active: 1997–1999, 2003
- Label: Recommended
- Past members: Chris Cutler; Stevan Tickmayer; Bob Drake; Fred Frith; Amy Denio; Claudio Puntin; Mike Johnson

The Science Group were an avant-rock group founded in France in 1997 by English drummer Chris Cutler from Henry Cow and Yugoslav contemporary classical composer and keyboardist Stevan Tickmayer. They released A Mere Coincidence, an album of songs on science related topics in 1999, and an instrumental album, Spoors in 2003.

The Science Group were seen by some as an "avant-prog nerd's dream band". Their music was principally avant-rock but also covered a variety of other genres including avant-garde jazz, contemporary classical, avant-garde, ambient and electronic.

== History ==
Chris Cutler met Stevan Tickmayer in 1981 in Novi Sad in the former Yugoslavia while touring with Geoff Leigh's band, Black Sheep. Cutler came into contact with Tickmayer again in the early 1990s when Cutler's Recommended Records label in London began importing and distributing some of Tickmayer's albums. In 1991 Tickmayer moved to France and invited Cutler to work with him on the music for various choreographic productions. In 1996 Cutler suggested to Tickmayer that they make a song record using "science" texts Cutler had been developing since 1992. Cutler remarked later in a 1999 interview:

I have always been interested in the discourse and practice of the sciences: its method, rigour, and scope. It seems to me that sometimes that there is more poetry in science today than in poetry, or at least as much; and, for imagination, there are concepts in the sciences that can compete with any contemporary literary work.

Songs by Cutler on science related topics had previously been recorded by Art Bears and News from Babel, but this was to be his first album devoted exclusively with this subject matter.

Using Cutler's texts, Tickmayer composed the music for a suite of songs that became the Science Group's first album, A Mere Coincidence. Tickmayer and Cutler began recording the album in May 1997 at Studio Midi Pyrenees in Caudeval, France. They invited Fred Frith (ex-Henry Cow) to join them and he added guitars to the mix. Then the ADATs recorded so far and a score were sent to Claudio Puntin in Germany who added bassclarinet. After the tapes were returned to the studio in France, Amy Denio (from Tone Dogs) joined them and sang the texts. Bob Drake (from Thinking Plague) handled all the mixing and also added bass guitar, singing and overdubbed guitars and percussion. The whole process continued on and off until January 1999 when the production work was completed. A Mere Coincidence was released later in 1999 on Cutler's Recommended Records label, with the Science Group being billed as Cutler (texts), Tickmayer (music), Drake (production), plus Frith, Puntin and Denio.

The group remained dormant until 2002 when they reassembled as a quartet of Cutler, Tickmayer, Drake and Mike Johnson (from Thinking Plague) to record their second album, Spoors. It comprised four suites of purely instrumental pieces composed by Tickmayer and was released in 2003, also on Recommended Records.

The Science Group never performed live, although they were invited to play at the annual Festival International de Musique Actuelle de Victoriaville in Canada, which they had to turn down due to other commitments by some of the group members.

== Name ==
The Science Group took their name from the subject matter of Chris Cutler's song texts that were used on their first album. The texts focused on science related topics, including theoretical physics, cosmology and genetic engineering. Their second album was purely instrumental, but the group retained their name for this album.

== Members ==
- Chris Cutler – drums, electronics, texts
- Stevan Tickmayer – keyboards, samples, piano, prepared piano, piano strings, electric organ, violin, electric guitar, double bass, Hungarian zither, music
- Bob Drake – bass guitar, guitar, percussion, vocals, production
- Fred Frith – guitars
- Claudio Puntin – clarinet, bass clarinet
- Amy Denio – vocals
- Mike Johnson – guitars

== Discography ==
=== Albums ===
- A Mere Coincidence (1999, CD, Recommended Records, UK)
- Spoors (2003, CD, Recommended Records, UK)
