= Hunger's Teeth =

Studio album by 5uu's
- Released: 1994
- Recorded: 1994
- Genre: Avant-rock
- Length: 43:52
- Label: Recommended
- Producer: Bob Drake

5uu's chronology
Elements (1988)	Hunger's Teeth (1994)	Crisis in Clay (1997)

Hunger's Teeth is a 1994 studio album by the American avant-rock group 5uu's. It was the first album by the band since they reformed in 1994 and featured the new line-up of Dave Kerman, Sanjay Kumar and Bob Drake.

The album also featured four guest musicians, including Susanne Lewis from Thinking Plague and Hail, and Thomas Dimuzio, who was the solo performer on the track "Mangate".

== Track listing ==
1. "Well... Not Chickenshit" (Kerman) – 6:35
2. "Roan" (Kerman) – 3:03
3. "Mangate" (Dimuzio) – 2:55
4. "Geronimo" (Kerman, Kumar) – 4:51
5. "Glue" (Kerman) – 2:41
6. "Opportunity Bangs" (Kerman, Kumar) – 5:18
7. "The Shears" (Drake, Kerman) – 1:25
8. "Bachelor Needle" (Kerman) – 2:16
9. "Truth, Justice, and the American Way" (Kerman, Kumar) – 5:35
10. "Equus" (Kerman) – 5:06
11. "Traveler Waits for No One" (Kerman) – 3:27

== Personnel ==
- Dave Kerman – drums, guitar, keyboards
- Sanjay Kumar – keyboards
- Bob Drake – vocals, bass guitar, guitar, violin, recording engineer

with:

- Thomas Dimuzio – electronics
- Susanne Lewis – vocals
- James Grigsby – guitar, vibes, bass
- Michelle Bos – utensils, penny fountain, skydiving ocarinas, metal tables, creaks, blue rocks
