= Crisis in Clay =

Studio album by 5uu's
- Released: December 23, 1997
- Recorded: 1994–1996
- Genre: Avant-rock
- Label: Recommended
- Producer: 5uu's

5uu's chronology
| Hunger's Teeth (1994) | Crisis in Clay (1997) | Regarding Purgatories (2000) |

Professional ratings
Review scores
| Source | Rating |
|---|---|
| AllMusic | 4.5/5 stars |

Crisis in Clay is the fourth studio album by the American avant-rock group 5uu's, which was released on December 23, 1997.

== Track listing ==
1. "Comeuppance" (Kerman) – 3:48
2. "Broadside Hits and Near Misses" (Kerman) – 2:21
3. "The How-To's of Self Taught" (Kerman) – 3:40
4. "Bought the Farm" (Kerman) – 4:19
5. "Simply Agree" (Drake, Kerman) – 1:38
6. "Goliath in the Sights" (Kerman) – 4:18
7. "December" (Kerman) –2:55
8. "Hunter Gatherer" (Kerman) – 3:30
9. "What Price Virtue?" (Kerman) – 3:19
10. "Darkened Doors" (Kerman) – 4:54
11. "The Encounter" (Kerman) – 3:26
12. "The Willful Suspension of Disbelief" (Kerman) – 3:41
13. "Cirrus" (Kerman) – 3:38
14. "Weaponry" (Kerman) – 1:11
15. "Absolutely, Absolute" (Kerman) – 3:48
16. "Ringing in the New Ear" (Kerman) – 0:42

== Personnel ==
- Bob Drake – bass, guitar, violin, vocals
- Dave Kerman – guitar, drums, keyboards
- Sanjay Kumar – keyboards, talking

with

- Scott Brazieal – vibraphone
- Thomas Dimuzio – electronic sounds, computer editing
