= PTHS =

PTHS can refer to:

- Paducah Tilghman High School
- Parathyroid hormones
- Pitt-Hopkins syndrome
- Port Townsend High School
- Pontiac Township High School
- National Pingtung Senior High School
- Proviso Township High Schools District 209
- Pths is the abbreviation for the orchid genus Pleurothallis
