= Mike Johnson (guitarist) =

American experimental rock musician

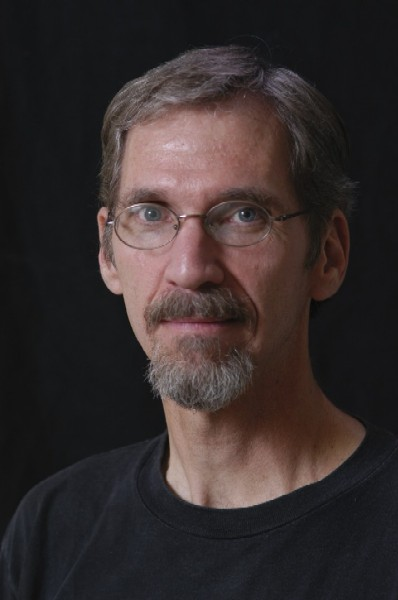
- Mike Johnson 2003

Background information
- Born: 1952 (age 73–74); United States
- Genre: Avant-rock
- Occupations: Musician, composer
- Instrument: Guitar
- Years active: 1978–present
- Labels: Recommended, Cuneiform

Mike Johnson (born 1952) is an American guitarist and composer, best known as the co-founder and member of the Denver-based avant-rock group Thinking Plague. He has also been a member of Hamster Theatre and The Science Group, and has collaborated with several musicians, including Bob Drake, Susanne Lewis and Janet Feder.

== Biography ==
Mike Johnson played in his first band at the age of 13 and began writing music at 17. He studied classical and electronic music in college in Denver but taught himself the guitar and composition. While at college in 1978 Johnson answered an advertisement at a local music store requesting a guitar player "into Henry Cow, Yes…" This put him in touch with bass guitarist and drummer Bob Drake. Johnson and Drake initially played in a few cover bands but in 1980 they began experimenting with prepared guitars and tape machines, and recording material Johnson had written. "Our goal was to combine the harder edge of progressive rock, as in Crimson and Yes, with the more modern tonalities and experimental approach as reflected in the work of the Art Bears, our major heroes at the time." By 1982 they had enough material to perform live and enlisted three other musicians for a brief tour of Denver. This band became the first incarnation of Thinking Plague.

=== Thinking Plague ===
Thinking Plague was active on and off between 1982 and 2019 and quickly achieved prominence in avant-rock circles. They made seven studio albums, and released one live album recorded at NEARfest in 2000. Johnson and Drake led the group until Drake left in the early 1990s after which Johnson took the helm. Most of Thinking Plague's material was composed by Johnson.

=== Other bands and collaborations ===
While Thinking Plague has dominated most of Johnson's musical career, he has also been a member of Hamster Theatre since 1996 and The Science Group in 2003. He toured with the 5uu's and Hail in the mid-1990s and has collaborated with a number of musicians, including Bob Drake, Susanne Lewis, Janet Feder and Fred Frith.

== Discography ==
Solo

- The Gardens of Loss (2026, CD, Cuneiform Records, US)

With Thinking Plague

- ...A Thinking Plague (1984, LP, Endemic Music, US)
- Moonsongs (1987, LP, Dead Man's Curve Records, UK)
- Driving Me Backwards (compilation) (1987, LP, Dead Man's Curve Records, UK)
- In This Life (1989, CD, Recommended Records ReR, UK)
- RēR Records Quarterly Vol.2 No.4 (1989, LP, Recommended Records, UK)
- RēR Quarterly Vol.4 No.1 (1994, CD, Recommended Records, UK)
- In Extremis (1998, CD, Cuneiform Records, US)
- A History of Madness (2003, CD, Cuneiform Records, US)
- Upon Both Your Houses (live at NEARfest 2000) (2004, CD, NEARfest Records, US)
- Decline and Fall (2012, CD, Cuneiform Records, US)
- Hoping Against Hope (2017, CD, Cuneiform Records, US)

With Hamster Theatre

- Siege on Hamburger City (1998, CD, Cricetus, US)
- Carnival Detournement (2001, CD, Cuneiform Records, US)
- The Public Execution of Mr. Personality / Quasi Dayroom (2006, CD, Cuneiform Records, US) (partially recorded at Progman Cometh)

With Hail

- Turn of the Screw (1990, CD, Cuneiform Records, US)

With Janet Feder

- Speak Puppet (2001, CD, Recommended Records ReR, US)

With Fred Frith

- Prints (2002, CD, Recommended Records ReR, UK)

With The Science Group

- Spoors (2003, CD, Recommended Records ReR, UK)

With Luciano Margorani

- My Favorite Strings (2004, CD, Isinaz, Italy)

With David Shamrock

- Thin Pillow (2004, CD, Pillowsounds, US)

With Yugen

- Iridule (2010, CD, AltrOck, Italy)

With Dave Willey

- Immeasurable Currents (2011, CD, AltrOck, Italy)

With 5uu's

- Live at A.K.W. Würzburg, Germany April 8, 1995 (2023, dig download, Cuneiform Records, US)

== See also ==
- Romantic Warriors II: A Progressive Music Saga About Rock in Opposition
- Romantic Warriors II: Special Features DVD
