= Shotty =

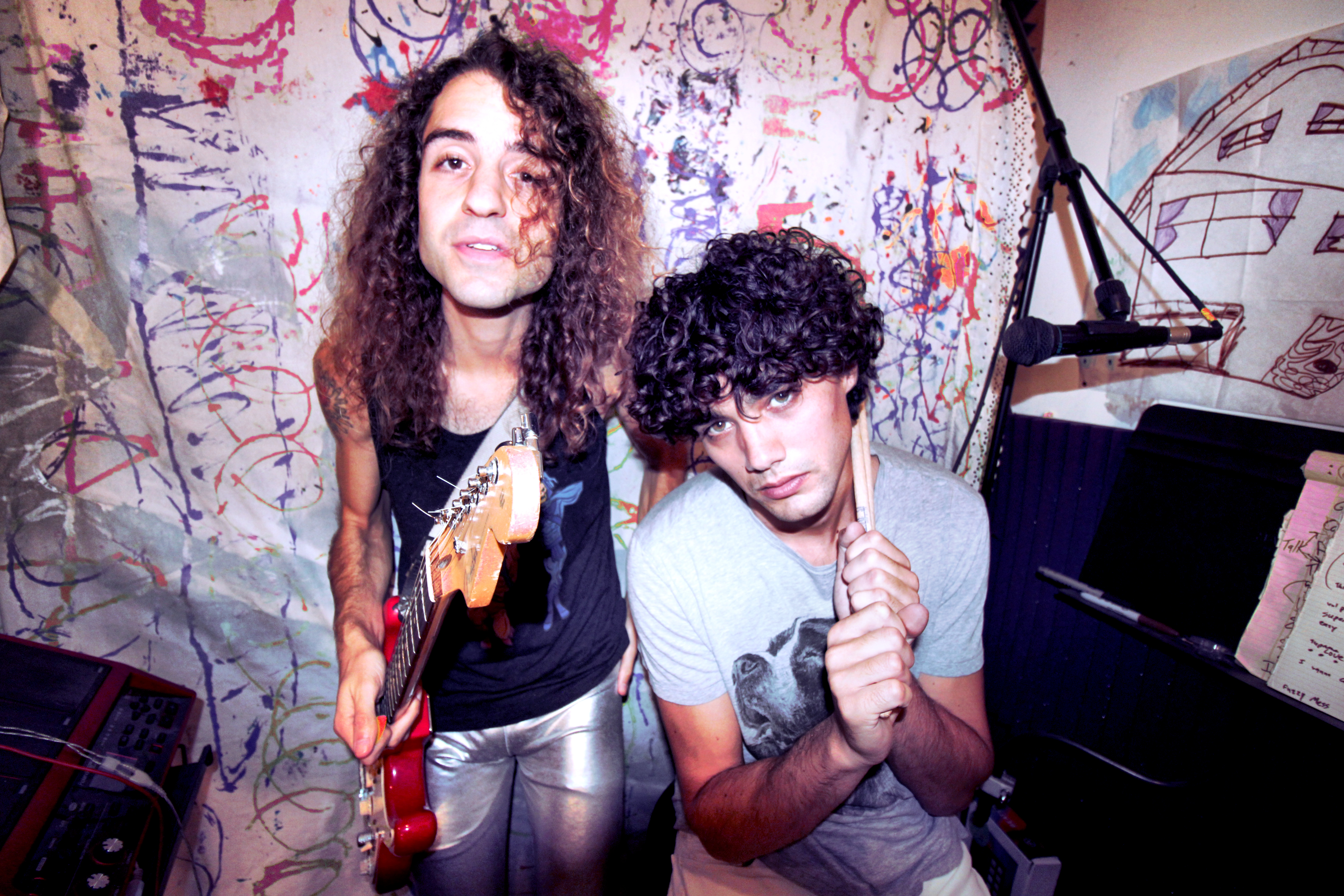
- The members: Pat Moon, Miles Frank

Background information
- Origin: Seattle, Washington
- Genres: Alternative rock Synth pop
- Years active: 2004–present
- Label: Unsigned
- Members: Pat Moon; Miles Frank
- Website: www.facebook.com/shottylovesyou www.shottylovesyou.com

Shotty is an indie rock band from Seattle, WA. After its formation in 2004 as a solo project of vocalist/guitarist Pat Moon, today Shotty is presented with 2 long-term members, including Miles Frank on the drums. In their early years, Shotty released a steady stream of music that includes four out of print albums and many demo CD's. Shotty's music combines elements of guitar-heavy 90's grunge and alternative rock, synth-heavy 80's new wave music, as well as a modern Seattle indie aesthetic.

Shotty were semi-finalists in the 2008 EMP Sound Off! battle of the bands at the Experience Music Project. In 2009, Shotty worked with Seattle producer Martin Feveyear to record a 3-song EP that was released the same year, followed by a home recorded 7-song EP. Both releases are now out of print. In 2011, Shotty were finalists in the Hard Rock Cafe Battle of the Bands competition.

Shotty has performed across the west coast at venues including the Whisky a Go Go, The Viper Room, and Northwest Folklife Festival, as well as appearances on the east coast, including a New York Fashion Week showcase event in New York City. Shotty has performed with Gosling, Natalie Portman's Shaved Head, Sirens Sister, New Faces, and many other bands.

Shotty released their first official full-length album, Superfan, in 2011. Later in the year they tracked drums for their second album at Swing House Studio in Hollywood, California. The rest of the instruments were recorded at Crackle & Pop Recording Studio in Seattle, Washington by Johnny Sangster (Mudhoney), and mixed at Electrokitty Recording. Shotty released 3 songs from the sessions in an EP titled 2012 EP.

In 2013, Shotty worked with Clatter & Din Studios and Rob Daiker (Royal Bliss, The Fame Riot) to record a single titled Goodnight. Later in the year, Shotty relocated to Los Angeles, CA and began working on recordings with producer Norm Block (Plexi, Sweethead).

Shotty released their first in a series of EPs; a Double A-side called I'm Glad It's Over / So Long. The EP was released by the indie record label Cautionary Tail Records via INgrooves Music Group, part of the Manimal Label Group. The followed up by two music videos, and premiered on various music websites.
