= Illegal Bass =

Studio album by Bass Outlaws
- Released: 1992
- Genre: Miami bass
- Length: 50:29
- Label: Newtown Music

Bass Outlaws chronology
Illegal Bass (1992)	Busted (1994)

Illegal Bass is the début album by Miami bass group Bass Outlaws.

== Track listing ==
No.	Title	Length
1.	"3 Kinds of Bass"	4:01
2.	"I Want Some Bass"	4:15
3.	"Slow Down the Bass"	3:59
4.	"It's Bass"	4:49
5.	"Slo Mello Bass"	5:25
6.	"Bass my Beat"	4:16
7.	"Bass On It"	4:35
8.	"Beau's Bass"	3:53
9.	"In Your Bass"	4:09
10.	"Boomin' Bass"	3:40
11.	"Illegal Bass"	4:01
12.	"Stereo Bass (Extreme Woofer Test)"	3:38
