= Port Townsend High School =

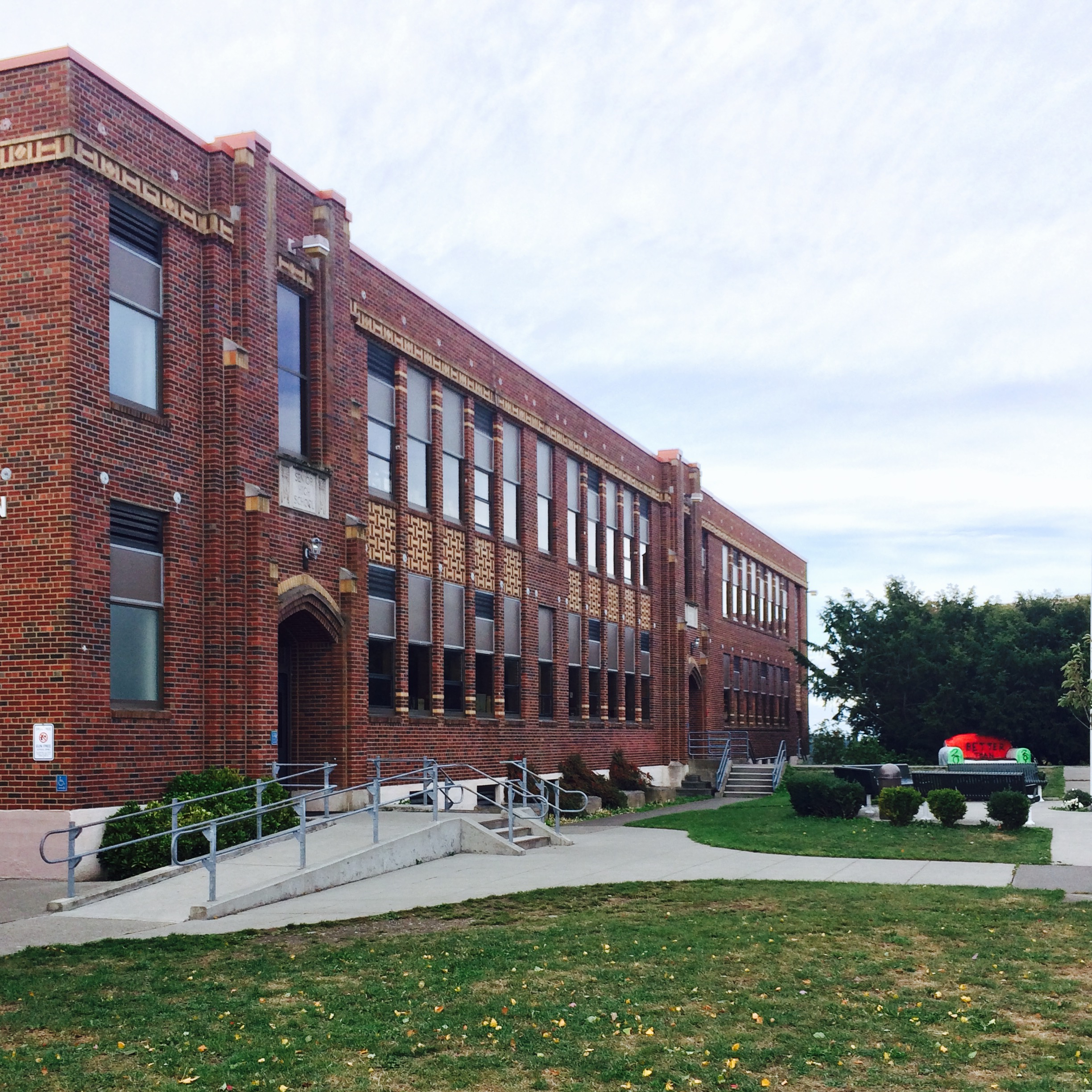
- Port Townsend HS, main building entry 2015

Location
- 1500 Van Ness St. Port Townsend, Washington 98368; United States
- Coordinates: 48°7′5″N 122°46′2″W

Information
- Type: Public secondary
- Established: 1890; 136 years ago
- School district: Port Townsend School District
- NCES School ID: 530684001007
- Principal: Carrie Ehrhardt (2001—2024) Sean Moss (2024—present)
- Teaching staff: 18.92 (FTE)
- Grades: 9–12
- Enrollment: 361 (2023-2024)
- Student to teacher ratio: 19.08
- Colors: Red, white
- Mascot: Redhawks
- Website: highschool.ptschools.org

Port Townsend High School is located in Port Townsend, Washington. It is one of the oldest in Washington State, graduating its first class in 1891. Port Townsend High School is a comprehensive public high school, serving approximately 350 students in grades 9-12 in 2018, and is fully approved and accredited by the State of Washington and the Northwest Commission on Colleges and Universities.

== Campus buildings ==
Port Townsend High School has five buildings. The three-story Main Building houses classrooms on the 3rd floor, offices on the 2nd, and lunch areas on the 1st. The two-story Annex Building houses mostly math and science classes, and some English classes. The one-room Art Portable houses art classes. The one-story Gymnasium houses physical education, robotics, and other maritime classes. The one-story Stuart Building houses technology classes.

Named for the former U.S. president, Port Townsend's Lincoln School, which is on the Port Townsend High School campus, was completed in 1892. It was originally a three-story building with a tower and bell. The third story was deemed unsafe and removed when a wind of hurricane force blew off the roof in 1934. The building later fell short of the fire code requirements and was closed in 1980.

== Academics ==
Port Townsend High School had 30 faculty members in 2013. In the 2007-2008 school year, the student-to-teacher ratio was 16 students per teacher. Faculty had an average 14 years of teaching experience, and more than half had graduate degrees. The dropout rate is 3.5%, less than the state average.

== Activities ==
=== Drama ===
Port Townsend High School has an active drama program, whose production of Gypsy: A Musical Fable in 2008 won Special Honors for Educational Impact at the 5th Avenue High School Musical Theatre Awards.

=== Knowledge Bowl ===
PTHS won the 27th annual 1A State Knowledge Bowl title in the final round on Saturday, March 27, 2010. The competition that year featured the eighteen top 1A schools in the state, all of whom had qualified for State by virtue of their finishes in regional competitions.

=== Athletics ===
PTHS is a class 1A school in the Olympic League.

In 2013, the school board unanimously voted to replace the Redskins team name, which had existed since 1926, with the Redhawks team name. The cross country team placed 8th at 1A state with their top runner Ryan Clarke placing 1st overall.

== Notable alumni ==
- Tom Baker, PTHS Class of 1952, Former MLB pitcher (Chicago Cubs, 1963)
- Kyle Hove, PTHS Class of 2009, member of the band New Faces
- Nico Janssen, PTHS Class of 2008, member of the band New Faces
- Parker Lundgren, PTHS Class of 2005, member of the band Queensrÿche
- Art McLarney, PTHS Class of 1928, Former MLB player (New York Giants)
- Greg Sherman, PTHS Class of 1972, co-founder of the band Glass
- Jeff Sherman, PTHS Class of 1970, co-founder of the band Glass
- Marvin Glenn Shields, PTHS Class of 1958, U.S. Navy, Medal of Honor, Vietnam War casualty (1965)
- Conor Sisk, PTHS Class of 2009, member of the band New Faces
- John Stroeder, PTHS Class of 1976, Former NBA player (Milwaukee Bucks, 1987-88 season)
