= Glass (band) =

American progressive rock band

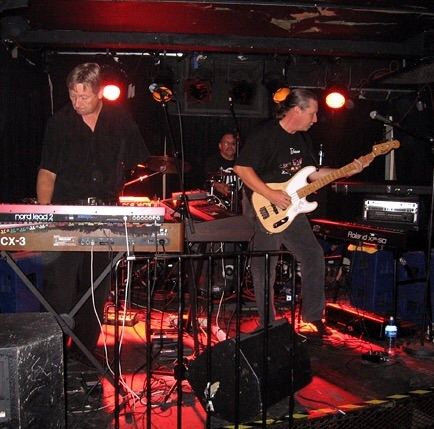
- Glass onstage Oslo, Norway 2007

Background information
- Origin: Port Townsend, Washington, USA
- Genres: Progressive rock, canterbury scene, jazz rock
- Years active: 1968–1977, 1999–present
- Labels: Musea, Relentless Pursuit
- Members: Greg Sherman; Jeff Sherman; Jerry Cook; Guests: Hugh Hopper; Elton Dean; Phil Miller; Richard Sinclair; William Kopecky; Elaine DiFalco
- Past members: Paul Black (drums); Mark Hawley (electric violin); Erik Poulsen (sound engineer, photographer)
- Website: Glass official website, BandCamp page

Glass is an American progressive rock trio from the Pacific Northwest. The group consists of Greg Sherman (born 1954) on keyboards, vibes and Mellotron, his brother Jeff Sherman (b. 1952) on bass guitar, guitar, bass pedals and keyboards, and their childhood friend Jerry Cook (b. 1953) on drums and percussion.

== History ==
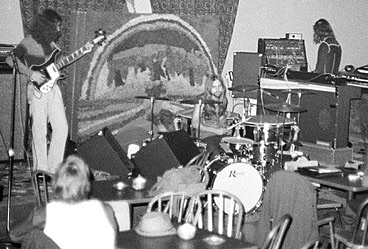
Glass at the Court C Coffeehouse, 1972

Glass began in the 1960s as a Port Townsend-based rock band called The Vaguest Notion, playing covers and the occasional original piece. On September 6, 1968, they attended a Jimi Hendrix concert at the Seattle Center Coliseum where the opening act was the British band The Soft Machine. They were transfixed by The Soft Machine, a guitar-less power trio. Shortly thereafter The Vaguest Notion changed their name to Glass and began playing originals exclusively. In 1970 Jeff and Greg attended the Famous Arrangers Clinic in Las Vegas, further refining their songwriting skills. Moving to Olympia, Washington in 1971 to attend The Evergreen State College, they quickly became favorites on campus for their spirited performances. Numerous live performances in and around Olympia, Seattle, Tacoma, Bellingham, Port Townsend and other Pacific Northwest venues (including the first-ever live broadcast concert on KAOS-FM) gave them considerable local attention and accolades. They received their best reception at the first Jimi Hendrix Memorial Concert in Seattle (January 22, 1971 at the Eagles Auditorium Building), where they were the only band to play totally original material. Professional studio recordings were made in 1975, which they then shopped to various record labels in an attempt to land a record contract.

=== Dissolution ===
The mid-1970s was not a good time for rehearsal-intensive progressive rock. The music industry was being taken over by punk rock and disco to the point where even well-established rock acts were being dropped from their labels. Despite their well-honed local reputation, Glass was not offered a contract by any of the dozens of labels they approached on the West Coast and in New York City. Two members even undertook a trip to London in the summer of 1975 to speak with industry representatives in the birthplace of progressive rock, but if anything the economic and musical depression was even worse in England.

In 1977 additional recordings were made at Seattle's premiere Kaye-Smith Studios, but despite positive comments from everyone who heard them, no recording contract was forthcoming.

Disappointed and disillusioned, the band officially went into remission rather than compromise. The band members went their separate ways, to pursue solo careers (see Jeff Sherman), start families and generally pretend to be normal people.

=== Re-emergence ===
In the mid-1990s, Glass started their own small-run record label, Relentless Pursuit Records, to release Glass music and solo recordings by the band members.

A 2-CD set of all of their professional (and some amateur) recordings from 1973 to 1977 was released, entitled No Stranger To The Skies. Following the success of that release a third volume was released the following year. Several concerts were arranged and performed, not only in the Pacific Northwest (Progman Cometh Festival in 2002 and 2003) but also in Mexico (BajaProg Festival in 2002 and 2004) and Claremont, CA (ProgWest Festival, 2001).

=== Contract at last ===
The acclaim garnered by their live performances attracted the attention of French independent progressive rock label Musea Records, who in 2004 offered to re-release No Stranger To The Skies and distribute it worldwide. This release brought Glass global recognition.

Simultaneously the Sherman brothers were brimming with ideas for new music, and began writing and rehearsing new material for their "first all-original album in 27 years." That album, Illuminations, was produced by keyboardist Greg Sherman and featured a cover photo by Glass's longtime engineer and sound man Erik Poulsen. It was released by Musea in 2005 to great reviews. Illuminations features guest appearances by some of the Canterbury scene's best musicians—the same movement that had sparked the formation of Glass some 37 years earlier—including Hugh Hopper (ex-Soft Machine), Richard Sinclair and Phil Miller.

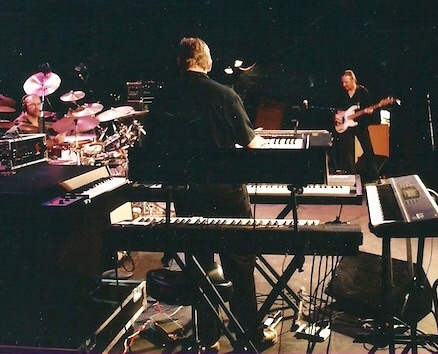
Glass live at Progman Cometh

In October 2007 Glass embarked on their first European tour to support their newly released live recording on Musea, Glass Live at Progman Cometh.

Glass returned to the recording studio in 2008 and 2009 to record their fourth album for Musea, entitled Spectrum Principle. It was released worldwide on October 15, 2010. Produced by drummer Jerry Cook, it is a departure from their previous studio album, Illuminations, featuring a wilder, more experimental sound.

In April 2011 Glass came back to their hometown of Port Townsend, Washington to record a "live in-the-studio" album. They booked the old Arcadia Barn, where they had recorded thirty-eight years earlier, now renovated and called The Palindrome. Produced by bassist Jeff Sherman, the album was recorded in Zen style; the band did not undergo the usual months of pre-recording preparations but instead came together in the studio and played whatever ideas came to mind. These recordings were made largely on period instruments, in the old-fashioned way, directly to a two-track analog tape recorder, just as they had in 1973. They were also given permission to record inside The First Presbyterian Church of Port Townsend on their 1849 Whalley-Genung pipe organ. The album, titled Palindrome, was mastered by Michael King (engineer and author of Wrong Movements: A Robert Wyatt Biography) and released in 2014 on Musea Records.

During March and April 2015 Glass laid down basic tracks for a new album, entitled Emergence. Produced by Greg Sherman, the album went through a long two-year gestation of being honed and edited, eventually adding some sax and vocals by three guest musicians. The album was released January 5, 2018.

Glass has a cameo in the 2015 film about the Canterbury scene, Romantic Warriors III: Canterbury Tales, and appears more extensively (over 26 minutes of performance footage, plus two interviews) in the companion disc Romantic Warriors III: Special Features DVD, both from Zeitgeist Media.

With the decline in physical media, in 2022 Glass began making their back catalog available on platforms such as Bandcamp, Amazon, YouTube, Apple Music, Spotify, and TikTok.

== Discography ==
- 2001: No Stranger To The Skies, Vol.s I & II (Relentless Pursuit Records RD4128) and Bandcamp
- 2002: No Stranger To The Skies, Vol. III (Relentless Pursuit Records RD4128-III)
- 2004: No Stranger To The Skies (re-issue, Musea Records FGBG 4516.AR)
- 2005: Illuminations (Musea Records FGBG 4594.AR) (feat. Hugh Hopper, Richard Sinclair, Phil Miller)
- 2007: Glass Live At Progman Cometh (Musea Records FGBG 4736.AR) (feat. Hugh Hopper, Richard Sinclair, Elton Dean, William Kopecky, Paul Kopecky)
- 2010: Spectrum Principle (Musea Records FGBG 4854)
- 2014: Palindrome (Musea Records FGBG 4935)
- 2018: Emergence (Musea Records FGBG 4994) (feat. Hugh Hopper on one track)
- 2022: BajaProg 2004 (feat. Richard Sinclair) (Bandcamp)
- 2022: Out Of Time: The Wayne Barker Session (recorded 1971) (Bandcamp)
- 2022: No Stranger to the Skies, Vol. IV (recorded 1972–1976) (Bandcamp)
- 2022: After Playing at Lester's (recorded 1969) (Bandcamp)
- 2022: The Arcadia Tapes (recorded 1973 & 1975) (Bandcamp)
- 2022: Going Far Away (recorded 1988) (Bandcamp)
- 2022: The Border (by Greg Sherman) (Bandcamp)
- 2022: Canterburied in Seattle 2002 (excerpts from the 2002 Progman Cometh concerts) (Bandcamp)
- 2022: Peninsula College (recorded 1978) (Bandcamp)
- 2022: PTHS (recorded 1972, 1973 & 1975) (Bandcamp)
- 2022: Progman 2003 (the complete 2003 Progman Cometh festival) (Bandcamp)
- 2022: Glassampler (a free sampler from the band's 50-year history) (Bandcamp)
- 2022: Zeitgeist (recorded 2016) (Bandcamp)
- 2022: The Robert Lang Session (featuring Richard Sinclair and Phil Miller in 2003 after Progman Cometh) (Bandcamp)
- 2022: Live in Europe (recorded 2007) (Bandcamp)
- 2022: The Lost Rehearsals (recorded in 1973) (Bandcamp)
- 2022: The HHR Tape (recorded 1975, remixed 1999) (Bandcamp)
- 2023: Chaos Insight (Bandcamp)
- 2023: Lecture Hall 1 (recorded 1972) (Bandcamp)
- 2023: NSCC (recorded 1973) (Bandcamp)
- 2023: The Europa Suite (recorded 2002) (Bandcamp)

== Filmography ==
- 2015: Romantic Warriors III: Canterbury Tales (DVD)
- 2016: Got Canterbury? Romantic Warriors III: Special Features DVD (DVD)
