= Jeff Sherman =

American musician (born 1952)

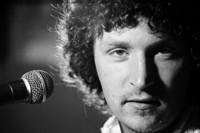
- Jeff Sherman, 1979

Background information
- Born: Jeffrey Edward Sherman; March 15, 1952 (age 74); Seattle, Washington, U.S.
- Genres: Progressive rock, experimental, folk music, rock music
- Occupations: Musician, composer
- Instruments: Bass guitar, Rhodes piano, keyboards, bass pedals, acoustic guitar, electric guitar, saxophone, cello, accordion, tapes, synthesizers, Mellotron
- Years active: 1966 – present
- Labels: Musea Records, Relentless Pursuit Records, Entropy Records, Grand West Records (MGM)
- Website: Jeff Sherman official website, BandCamp page

Jeffrey Edward Sherman (born March 15, 1952) is an American musician. He is a founding member of the band Glass and several other bands, as well as a solo artist who has released both under his own name and under the pseudonym Jeff Joad.

== Biography ==
=== Early career (1952–1969) ===
Four years after Jeff Sherman was born in Seattle, his father an electrical engineer for Seattle City Light, moved his wife and family to the tiny Skagit Valley town of Diablo in the North Cascades of Washington. The wilderness town which is mentioned in Jack Kerouac's 1958 novel The Dharma Bums was built by Seattle City Light as part of the Skagit River Hydroelectric Project for their employees. Qualified engineers were needed so as an enticement, free rent and utilities were offered in addition to the opportunity to raise a family in a pristine natural setting. Jeff, his brother Greg and their sister Janis grew up in the wilderness of the Cascade Range. Jeff began his formal musical training in Diablo in the early ‘60s, taking accordion lessons from a family friend at age eight. When the Sherman family moved to Port Townsend (on the Olympic Peninsula) in 1964, Jeff taught himself to play the electric guitar and in the spirit of the times, soon formed the first of many bands. When the bass player in one of these bands quit, Jeff switched to the bass guitar, which eventually became his main composing tool for progressive music. In Port Townsend High School, Jeff played saxophone in the school concert band and cello in the school orchestra. As a senior he wrote “Euphoria 17,” an experimental avant-garde classical piece premiered by the school orchestra along with his keyboardist brother Greg, and their childhood friend drummer Jerry Cook. Jeff had just turned 17.

Jeff, Greg and Cook were by this time already performing as a rock and roll cover band called The Vaguest Notion. On September 6, 1968, they traveled to Seattle to attend a Jimi Hendrix concert. One of the opening acts for the concert was a British band called The Soft Machine. The Soft Machine was a trio (consisting at the time of Kevin Ayers, Robert Wyatt, and Mike Ratledge) but with an entirely new sound. The band left the concert determined to pursue a new direction.

=== With Glass (1969–1976) ===
Not long after the concert, Jeff and his bandmates resolved to play original music only. The profound effect that The Soft Machine's September 6 performance had on Jeff and the band can be found on page 145 of Graham Bennett's authorized Soft Machine biography Out-Bloody-Rageous. In keeping with the spirit of re-invention, The Vaguest Notion changed their name to Glass. Over the next six years they performed all over Western Washington, building a loyal fanbase. In 1971 they relocated to Olympia, Washington to attend The Evergreen State College and became favorites on-campus for their spirited performances. They performed the first-ever live concert broadcast on the college's new radio station, KAOS (FM). In 1975 professional recordings were undertaken in Seattle, which the band shopped around to labels up and down the West Coast, around New York and even in England. Unfortunately the mid-’70s were tough times for rehearsal-intensive progressive rock. Even well-established rock acts were being dropped by their labels. Despite their well-honed musicianship, strong local reputation and enormous efforts to secure a record deal, Glass remained unsigned.

Disillusioned, the band elected to break up rather than compromise.

=== Paying dues (1977–1983) ===
After Glass disbanded, Jeff returned to his roots of ‘60s rock and R&B, fronting a bar band called Changer (after a Glass song). The band performed a month-long residency in Havre, Montana to rowdy cowboys in a scene straight out of The Blues Brothers. In 1977 Changer toured Western Canada and became experts in learning the favorite songs of Canadian fur trappers. Later in the year personnel changes brought a name change to Straw Dogs (after the Sam Peckinpah film of the same name). The band began a 6-week November residency in frozen Whitehorse, Yukon, followed by more gigs in British Columbia. By 1978 the band had morphed once again to become The Sherman Brothers Band, and began playing regularly back in the States on the comparatively balmy Olympic Peninsula. When the Hood Canal Bridge sank during a windstorm, the band found themselves playing before a wildly appreciative captive audience. For the next two years the band gigged extensively and even professionally recorded a single (with legendary NW producer Don McKinney of Don and the Goodtimes). The Sherman Brothers Band is considered by those who witnessed their reign, to be one of the most popular bands to come out of Port Townsend, Washington. Their popularity at the peak of their career can be exemplified by a story related by Sherman on their MySpace fan page: "I remember one of the most incredible things happened to me and the guitar player, Jack Scott. We were walking up from a little grocery store near the Port Townsend Junior High School which we had both attended as kids. There was a playfield right below the school and across the street from the store. Suddenly some kid yells "Hey Look!! It's the Sherman Brothers!!!", and this huge mob of kids started running towards us! It was something right out of 'A Hard Days Night'".

Though playing the occasional original The Sherman Brothers Band remained primarily a covers band, so when the band evolved again in 1980, they took the name The Drive and concentrated on the large catalog of original songs Jeff had been writing. This band played frequently around Seattle, Bremerton, Washington, Kingston, Washington and Port Townsend but did not achieve the acclaim of The Sherman Brothers Band. With the Hood Canal Bridge repaired Sherman contemplated a career move to Los Angeles.

=== California (1983–1999) ===
When he was offered the opportunity to come to Los Angeles and sleep on the couch of legendary songwriter Ron Davies a friend who had mentored him as a teenager, he jumped at the chance. Soon thereafter he was pounding the pavements of that city taking demo tapes around to record companies by day and writing songs with Ron late into the early morning hours.

Southern California afforded Sherman not only closer proximity to the music industry, but also a view of poverty and homelessness he had not previously experienced. He lived near LA’s famous Skid Row and even for a time in the Glendale YMCA as he struggled to find performance opportunities. It was at this point he met and befriended novelist-to-be John O'Brien and formed a close bond. O'Brien encouraged Sherman in the pursuit of his songwriting goals and Sherman returned the favor by encouraging O'Brien in his nascent writing endeavors. He soon formed another band, called Alan Rench & The ViceGrips, and began playing venues up and down The Valley including The FM Station, The Palomino, The Roxy, The Whisky, The Troubadour and others. These clubs participated with event promoters in a pay-to-play arrangement known as “showcasing.” Bands are offered the chance to play these prestigious venues, but their contract fine print stipulates that the bands are liable for costs if the ticket sales fall below a certain minimum. He also founded along with singer/songwriter Sue Logg, a short-lived '60s retro band called The Chimes Of Freedom which specialized in original melodic rock songs in the musical vein of the great L.A. band The Byrds. Over the next couple of years Sherman managed to play regularly, but found himself losing money as often as he made it. Eventually he was lobbied by his brother Greg who had moved to Southern California in part to play with him to forgo the pay-to-play schemes offered by these promoters. Always a major trusted influence, Sherman heeded his brothers advice.

Living near the poverty line and rubbing shoulders with the area's vast homeless community stirred political activist feelings in Sherman, and his songwriting turned activist. He created a fictional alter ego named Jeff Joad (after the family in Steinbeck’s The Grapes of Wrath). Taking Woody Guthrie and Pete Seeger as models, Sherman began playing his folk protest songs at soup kitchens and homeless encampments, just himself and an acoustic guitar. Appalled at the disparity between rich and poor in Ronald Reagan’s America and the intentional dismantling of social safety nets, he started working with the Frontline Foundation and Xela-Aid distributing food and other necessities to those in need. In 1990 he released Time for a Change as Jeff Joad on his own Relentless Pursuit Records, with profits donated to charity. He traveled to Guatemala in 1991 and 1992 as part of Xela-Aid's in-country effort, providing music for the crowds waiting in line to see the volunteer doctors and nurses. In 1999 he released a second Jeff Joad album entitled Judgment of the Flame with several of his ex-bandmates. A video from this album, entitled Shine On, won a 1995 music video award from INTERCOM, the INTERnational COMmunications program of the Chicago International Film Festival.

=== With Glass again (1999–present) ===
In 1999 Glass came back together again, and Jeff put aside his Jeff Joad persona to devote all his energies to Glass. In 2001 Glass released a double CD of archival recordings called No Stranger To The Skies which earned uniformly positive reviews. No Stranger to the Skies was re-released by Musea worldwide in 2004. Glass released a new album in 2005 Illuminations and a live album Glass Live At Progman Cometh in 2007. At the Progman Cometh festivals in 2002 and 2003 Sherman met and befriended fellow bassist Hugh Hopper, and the two began working together via remote file sharing. Glass's next release, again on the Musea Label, was entitled "Spectrum Principle”. The music of Glass can also be purchased at iTunes and Bandcamp.

=== Solo (2002–present) ===
In addition to his work with Glass, Jeff has continued to compose both as a singer/songwriter (material outside the scope of Glass) and as an electronic musician. He has four solo albums recorded but has delayed release of the latter two to avoid conflicting with the Glass releases. His first, Above & Beyond, was issued in a limited edition by Relentless Pursuit Records in 2002. The second, Home, features Soft Machine bassist Hugh Hopper and was also a limited edition (2003). The other two have been slated for release on Musea's sub-label Gazul sometime in the near future. Meanwhile, Jeff continues to compose and record, when he's not busy with Glass, and even create some videos for his pieces. On the July 23, 2010, Jeff and his brother Greg signed licensing agreements with Muzak which will allow Muzak to use their original recordings in their programs worldwide. This will include not only Glass music but music from all their solo projects as well.

After the resurgence of "trickle-down economics" and the 2008 financial crisis under the George W. Bush Administration, the Jeff Joad persona was reactivated and Jeff has been performing around Southern California with a blend of older material and new compositions which focus on open tunings and slide guitar blues played on National steel resonator guitar. A new Jeff Joad album was released in 2016, and a possible tour of several European cities was contemplated, where he planned to street busk. In 2022 the Jeff Joad and Jeff Sherman catalogs were made available on Bandcamp.

== Discography ==
=== Under his name ===
- 2002: Above & Beyond (Relentless Pursuit Records RD4133) and Bandcamp
- 2003: Home (Relentless Pursuit Records RD4135) (featuring Hugh Hopper)
- 2004: Gauguin (Relentless Pursuit Records RD4136))
- 2007: 'Branes (Bandcamp)
- 2011: In Another Life (download album) ReverbNation
- 2015: Hugh Hopper - Was A Friend (duet with Hugh on one track - a track from 'Branes)
- 2018: Zen Music (with his son, Dylan Sherman) (Bandcamp)
- 2022: ZTF (5 Sketches in Progress - Planet 9) (Bandcamp)
- 2022: The Gaia Suite (complete) (Bandcamp)
- 2023: Göbekli Tepe (Bandcamp)
- 2023: The Survivor (Bandcamp)
- 2023: Borderline (Bandcamp)

=== With The Sherman Brothers Band ===
- 1978: “Indian Woman”/”She's The One” (single, Entropy Records E45-781)
- 2022: Sherman Bros. Band (recorded 1979) (Bandcamp)

=== With The Drive ===
- 2022: Complete Original Output of The Drive (recorded 1981) (Bandcamp)

=== With Alan Rench & The ViceGrips ===
- 2022: Ulysses Returned: The Complete Works (recorded 1983–88) (Bandcamp)

=== With The Chimes of Freedom ===
- 1987: It's Never Too Late (Bandcamp)

=== As Jeff Joad & the Joads ===
- 1990: Time For A Change (Relentless Pursuit Records RD4126) and Bandcamp
- 1999: Judgment of the Flame (Relentless Pursuit Records RD4127 and Bandcamp)
- 2016: Any Day Above Ground (Bluesy Mind Records BM 1010) and Bandcamp
- 2022: No Plan B, Obviously (recorded 2017) (Bandcamp)
- 2022: Busking the Blues (recorded 2022) (Bandcamp)

=== With Glass ===
- 2001: No Stranger To The Skies, Vol.s I & II (Relentless Pursuit Records RD4128) (Bandcamp)
- 2002: No Stranger To The Skies, Vol. III (Relentless Pursuit Records RD4128-III)
- 2004: No Stranger To The Skies (Musea Records FGBG 4516.AR)
- 2005: Illuminations (Musea Records FGBG 4594.AR)
- 2007: Glass Live At Progman Cometh (Musea Records FGBG 4736.AR)
- 2010: Spectrum Principle (Musea Records FGBG 4854)
- 2014: Palindrome (Musea FGBG 4935)
- 2018: Emergence (Musea FGBG 4994)
- 2022: BajaProg 2004 (Bandcamp)
- 2022: Out of Time: The Wayne Barker Session (recorded 1971) (Bandcamp)
- 2022: No Stranger to the Skies, Vol. IV (recorded 1972–1976) (Bandcamp)
- 2022: After Playing at Lester's (recorded 1969) (Bandcamp)
- 2022: The Arcadia Tapes (recorded 1973 & 1975) (Bandcamp)
- 2022: Going Far Away (recorded 1988) (Bandcamp)
- 2022: Canterburied in Seattle 2002 (highlights from the 2002 Progman Cometh Festival) (Bandcamp)
- 2022: Peninsula College (recorded 1978) (Bandcamp)
- 2022: PTHS (recorded 1972, 1973 & 1975) (Bandcamp)
- 2022: Progman 2003 (the complete 2003 Progman Cometh Festival) (Bandcamp)
- 2022: Glassampler (a free sampler from the band's 50-year history) (Bandcamp)
- 2022: Zeitgeist (Bandcamp)
- 2022: The Robert Lang Session (featuring Richard Sinclair and Phil Miller after Progman Cometh) (Bandcamp)
- 2022: Live in Europe (2007) (Bandcamp)
- 2022: The Lost Rehearsals (Bandcamp)
- 2022: The HHR Tape (recorded 1975, remixed 1999) (Bandcamp)
- 2023: Chaos Insight (Bandcamp)
- 2023: Lecture Hall 1 (Bandcamp)
- 2023: NSCC (recorded 1973) (Bandcamp)
- 2023" The Europa Suite (recorded 2002) (Bandcamp)

== Band personnel ==
=== The Silvertones (1965) ===
- Jeff Sherman - Sears Silvertone Stratotone electric guitar, lead vocals
- Mark Hawley - Sears Silvertone lead guitar, vocals
- Steve Adams - Sears Silvertone bass
- Rolf Heibenstreit - drums

=== Phaze III (1966) ===
- Jeff Sherman - guitar, lead vocals
- Steve Adams - bass guitar
- Jerry Cook - drums

=== The Outcasts (1966–1967) ===
- Jeff Sherman – guitar, lead vocals
- Mark Hawley – lead guitar, vocals
- Steve Adams – bass guitar
- Rolf Heibenstreit – drums

=== The Vaguest Notion (1967–1968) ===
- Jeff Sherman – guitar, lead vocals
- Greg Sherman – keyboards
- Mark Hawley – bass guitar, vocals
- Jerry Cook – drums

=== Glass (1969–1976) ===
- Jeff Sherman – electric & acoustic guitars, bass guitar, Fender Rhodes piano, Moog Taurus bass pedals, vocals
- Greg Sherman – acoustic & electric pianos, Hohner Clavinet, ARP & Oberheim synthesizers, Mellotron, Hammond organ, vibes, custom electronics
- Jerry Cook – drums, tunable concert timpani, Moog drums, Minimoog synthesizer, percussion, gong
  - Mark Hawley – electric viola, electric violin
  - Paul Black – drums
  - Gary Ormiston – soprano sax

=== Changer (1976–1977) ===
- Jeff Sherman – guitar, lead vocals (Joe Cocker Review)
- Earl Weida – lead vocals
- Greg Sherman – keyboards
- Jack Scott – lead guitar, vocals
- Jim Smiley – keyboards, vocals
- Mark Hawley – bass guitar, vocals
- Paul Black – drums, vocals

=== Straw Dogs (1977–1978) ===
- Jeff Sherman – bass guitar, lead vocals
- Greg Sherman – keyboards
- Bob Moore – guitar
- Tim Oches – drums, vocals
- Tim Johnson – drums, vocals

=== The Sherman Brothers Band (1978–1980) ===
- Jeff Sherman – bass guitar, lead vocals
- Greg Sherman – keyboards
- Jack Scott – lead guitar, vocals
- Rick Wiley – drums, vocals
- Bob Moore – guitar
- Brian Nall – lead guitar
- Paul Black – drums, vocals

=== The Drive (1980–1983) ===
- Jeff Sherman – guitar, lead vocals
- Greg Sherman – keyboards, vocals
- Rick Lee – bass guitar, vocals
- Paul Buchignani – drums, vocals

=== The Promise (1982–1983) ===
- Jeff Sherman - guitar, lead vocals
- Greg Sherman - Hammond organ, Casio, vocals
- Jack Scott - lead guitar, vocals
- Dave Hutcheson - bass guitar
- Jim Smiley - piano, Hohner Clavinet
- "Minnesota Mike" - harp
- Paul Black - drums, vocals

=== Alan Rench & The ViceGrips (Seattle, 1983) ===
- Jeff Sherman – guitar, lead vocals
- Paul Black – drums
- Jim Smiley - keyboards
- Jack Scott - lead guitar, backing vocals
- Dave Hutcheson - bass

=== Alan Rench & The ViceGrips (L.A., 1983-86) ===
- Jeff Sherman – guitar, lead vocals
- Greg Sherman – keyboards, vocals
- Paul Black - drums
- Carrington MacDuffie – vocals, keyboards
- Jane Erskine – bass
- Rob "Brick" Schmidt – lead guitar
- Hamilton Metz III – guitar, backing vocals
- Jeff Brown - drums

=== The Chimes Of Freedom (1987–1988) ===
- Jeff Sherman – 12-string Rickenbacker lead guitar, lead vocals, acoustic & electric guitars, bass guitar, acoustic bass guitar, harmonica
- Sue Logg – lead vocals
- Hamilton Metz III – 12-string Rickenbacker rhythm guitar, electric guitar, vocals
- Denise Fraser – drums, claves, tambourine
- Paul Black – (two studio tracks) drums
- Randy Nichols – (live gigs) drums
- Jane Erskine – (live gigs) bass guitar

=== Alan Rench & The ViceGrips (L.A., Fall 1988) ===
- Jeff Sherman - guitar, lead vocals
- Ron Thorn - bass
- Pat - drums

=== Alan Rench & The ViceGrips (L.A., Winter 1989-1990) ===
- Jeff Sherman - guitar, lead vocals, drum machine, keyboards
- Bob Carson - lead guitar

=== Jeff Joad & The Joads (1989–1999, 2008-present) ===
- Jeff Joad – lead vocals, acoustic guitar, harmonica, piano
- Greg 'Lefty' Joad – real Hammond organ
- Andy Armer Joad – acoustic piano, digital Hammond organ
- Pete Pendras Joad – acoustic slide guitar
- Ron 'Jethro' Thorn Joad – bass guitar
- Al 'The Rench' Joad – bass guitar
- Sue Logg Joad – vocals
- Natalie Farr Joad – vocals
- Paul 'Pa' Black Joad – drums, percussion
- Vinnie Fazzari Joad – percussion, engineer

=== Glass (1999–present) ===
- Jeff Sherman – Alembic bass guitar, Thorn Custom Inlay Hugh Hopper bass guitar, Steinberger system Hohner electric guitar, C.F. Martin & Company D18 acoustic guitar, Fender Rhodes piano, Korg O1/W & Korg Karma Wavestations, Studio Logic bass pedals, Synthesizers.com analog modular synthesizer, Ensoniq DSK-1 samplers, Alien Devices Alien Sonifer Bent Keyboard, effects, samples
- Greg Sherman – grand piano, Hammond organ, Mellotron Mk VI, Wurlitzer electric piano, Hammond CRX Organ, Korg O1/W Wavestation, Roland A-90 digital piano, ARP 2600 synthesizer, ARP Odyssey synthesizer, MiniMoog synthesizer, effects, samples
- Jerry Cook – drums, timpani, hi-hat, percussion, gong, bells, spoken word
