= 5uu's =

American avant-rock group

- 5uu's in 1995; From the left: Dave Kerman, Sanjay Kumar and Bob Drake

Background information
- Also known as: Dave Kerman/5uu's
- Origin: United States
- Genre: Avant-rock
- Years active: 1984–1988, 1994–2004
- Labels: Recommended, Cuneiform
- Past members: Dave Kerman; Greg Conway; Jon Beck; Curt Wilson; Sanjay Kumar; Bob Drake; Deborah Perry; Udi Koomran
- Website: Dave Kerman/5uu's homepage

The 5uu's were an American avant-rock group founded in Los Angeles, California in 1984 by drummer-composer Dave Kerman. The group released their first album in 1986 and recorded a second in 1988 with Motor Totemist Guild, a similar band from the area. The two groups merged in 1988 to form U Totem and made two albums. When U Totem split up in 1994, the 5uu's reformed and went on to make two more albums. In 2000 the band became known as Dave Kerman/5uu's and released a further two albums under this name. After a long pause, an album, The Quiet In Their Bones was released in 2022.

The 5uu's were influenced by the European Rock in Opposition (RIO) movement of the late 1970s and created, along with other groups like Thinking Plague and Hail, an "American version of RIO".

== History ==
While in high school, Dave Kerman formed a garage band with guitarist Greg Conway and bassist Jon Beck. They began as a King Crimson cover band but soon switched to experimenting with noise music. In 1976 the band played at a Greenpeace Festival in San Diego, California, calling themselves, "Farmer Fred Genuflects to A-440". While their performance did not go down very well, one concert goer recognised potential and suggested they listen to Henry Cow and Faust.

=== 5uu's ===
These new influences prompted Kerman to explore new compositional techniques and he soon accumulated a collection of experimental songs. He added pop singer Curt Wilson to the band, who also ran a recording studio, and, calling themselves the "5uu's", they began recording Bel Marduk & Tiamat in 1984. The album, based on the concept of Babylonian cosmology, took two years to complete and was released in 1986 on their own label. They also released a single, "Bar Code" comprising the songs "Misery Loves Company" and "Hot & Cold Frog". Ex-Henry Cow drummer Chris Cutler of the British record label Recommended Records, always on the lookout for new talent, promoted and distributed Bel Marduk & Tiamat, giving the band much needed exposure.

Interest in the 5uu's resulted in several concert invitations and radio broadcasts in the Los Angeles area. Adding keyboardist Sanjay Kumar to the line-up, the band's first concert in late 1986 took place in Torrance, California, followed a few months later by their first radio broadcast on KXLU college radio. It was during these concerts that the 5uu's became acquainted with a band not unlike themselves, Motor Totemists Guild from Orange County, California, led by James Grigsby. The two bands collaborated on the 5uu's's next album, Elements, released on Motor Totemists Guild's own label, Rotary Totem Records in 1988. It was also released on Recommended Records. After recording Elements, the 5uu's and Motor Totemists Guild merged in 1988 to form U Totem to play at the Frankfurt Art Rock Festival in Germany. U Totem went on to make two albums for Cuneiform Records.

When U Totem split up in 1994, Kerman reformed the 5uu's with Kumar and multi-instrumentalist/vocalist/producer Bob Drake from Thinking Plague, and they recorded Hunger's Teeth, released in 1994. In 1995 Kerman and Drake moved into an old unoccupied farm house in Caudeval in southern France owned by Chris Cutler and ex-Henry Cow sound engineer EM (Maggie) Thomas. Cutler and Thomas had purchased the farm a few years earlier with a view to using it as a recording studio. Kerman and Drake undertook the task of renovating and converting the farm house, and it was named Studio Midi-Pyrenees, with Drake the resident engineer/producer. There the 5uu's recorded Crisis in Clay, released later in 1997. In 1995 the band, with Thinking Plague guitarist Mike Johnson, undertook two live tours (39 cities) in Europe.

=== Dave Kerman/5uu's ===
Kerman returned to the United States in 1999, and the 5uu's, now Kerman, Kumar, bass player Keith Macksoud and Thinking Plague vocalist Deborah Perry recorded Regarding Purgatories, released in 2000. As this was largely a solo effort by Kerman (he wrote all the music and played most of the instruments) the album was credited to "Dave Kerman/5uu's". In 2000 Kerman relocated to Tel Aviv in Israel where he teamed up with producer Udi Koomran. In Koomran's house between November 2000 and January 2001, Kerman, Koomran and Perry, recorded Abandonship, which was released in 2002 and also credited to "Dave Kerman/5uu's".

In May 2004, Dave Kerman/5uu's regrouped again in Israel, this time comprising Kerman, Drake, Cutler, Perry, Koomran and Janet Feder on prepared guitar. At the Ginger Studio in Tel Aviv they recorded three tracks, "Bulldozer", "Resolve" and "Community", making extensive use of the studio to manipulate and cut-and-paste sounds. "Bulldozer" included news commentary from Israel's incursion into the Palestinian territories and a real bulldozer played the final solo. "Resolve" used cut-up and resequenced words that Perry had sung on their previous album, Abandonship. The three tracks were later released as an online download-only EP entitled "Tel Aviv Construction Events 1–3".

In 2022, after a sixteen-year absence from the recording scene, Dave Kerman/5uu's released their ninth recording, "The Quiet In Your Bones", on Cuneiform Records.

== Name ==
The band's name was taken from the nomenclature of a defunct Los Angeles street gang whose graffiti appeared on buildings throughout much of the city at the time.

== Members ==
The dates below indicate the years that the musicians were active in the group.

- Dave Kerman (1984–2004) – drums, keyboards, guitar, vocals
- Greg Conway (1984–1987) – guitar
- Jon Beck (1984–1987) – bass guitar
- Curt Wilson (1984–1987) – vocals
- Randy Coleman (1984–1987) – guitar
- Chuck Turner (1984–1987) – keyboards
- Ken Ando (1984–1987) – guitar
- Scott Brazieal (1994–1995) – tour keyboards
- Mike Johnson (1994–1995) – tour guitar
- Mark Smoot (1995) – tour guitar
- Keith Macksoud (2000–2004) – bass
- Sanjay Kumar (1986–2004) – keyboards
- Bob Drake (1994–1997) – guitar, bass guitar, vocals, violin
- Deborah Perry (2000–2004) – vocals
- Udi Koomran (2002–2004) – sound
- Dror Feiler (2004) – contrabass saxophone
- Chris Cutler (2004) – electronic drums

== Discography ==
=== Albums ===
- Bel Marduk & Tiamat (1986, LP, U:r Records, US)
- Elements (with Motor Totemist Guild) (1988, LP, Rotary Totem Records, US)
- Hunger's Teeth (1994, CD, Recommended Records, UK)
- Crisis in Clay (1997, CD, Recommended Records, UK)
- Regarding Purgatories (2000, CD, Cuneiform Records, UK)
- Abandonship (2002, CD, Cuneiform Records, US)
- The Quiet in Your Bones (2022, Digital, Cuneiform Records, US)
- Live At AKW Würzburg (2023, Digital, Cuneiform Records, US)

=== Compilations ===
- Point of Views (1996, CD, Cuneiform Records, US) – re-issue of the LPs Bel Marduk & Tiamat and Elements, the single "Bar Code", plus other material.

=== EPs ===
- Tel Aviv Construction Events 1–3 (2004, download-only, Recommended Records, US)

=== Singles ===
- "Barcode" ("Misery Loves Company" / "Hot & Cold Frog") (1986, 7", U:r Records, US)

=== Other album appearances ===
- Rē Records Quarterly Vol.1 No.1 (1985, LP, Recommended Records, UK)
- Rē Records Quarterly Vol.2 No.2 (1987, LP, Recommended Records, UK)
- Rē Records Quarterly Vol.3 No.3 (1991, LP, Recommended Records, UK)
