= Val-de-Lambronne =

Commune in Occitanie, France

- Commune
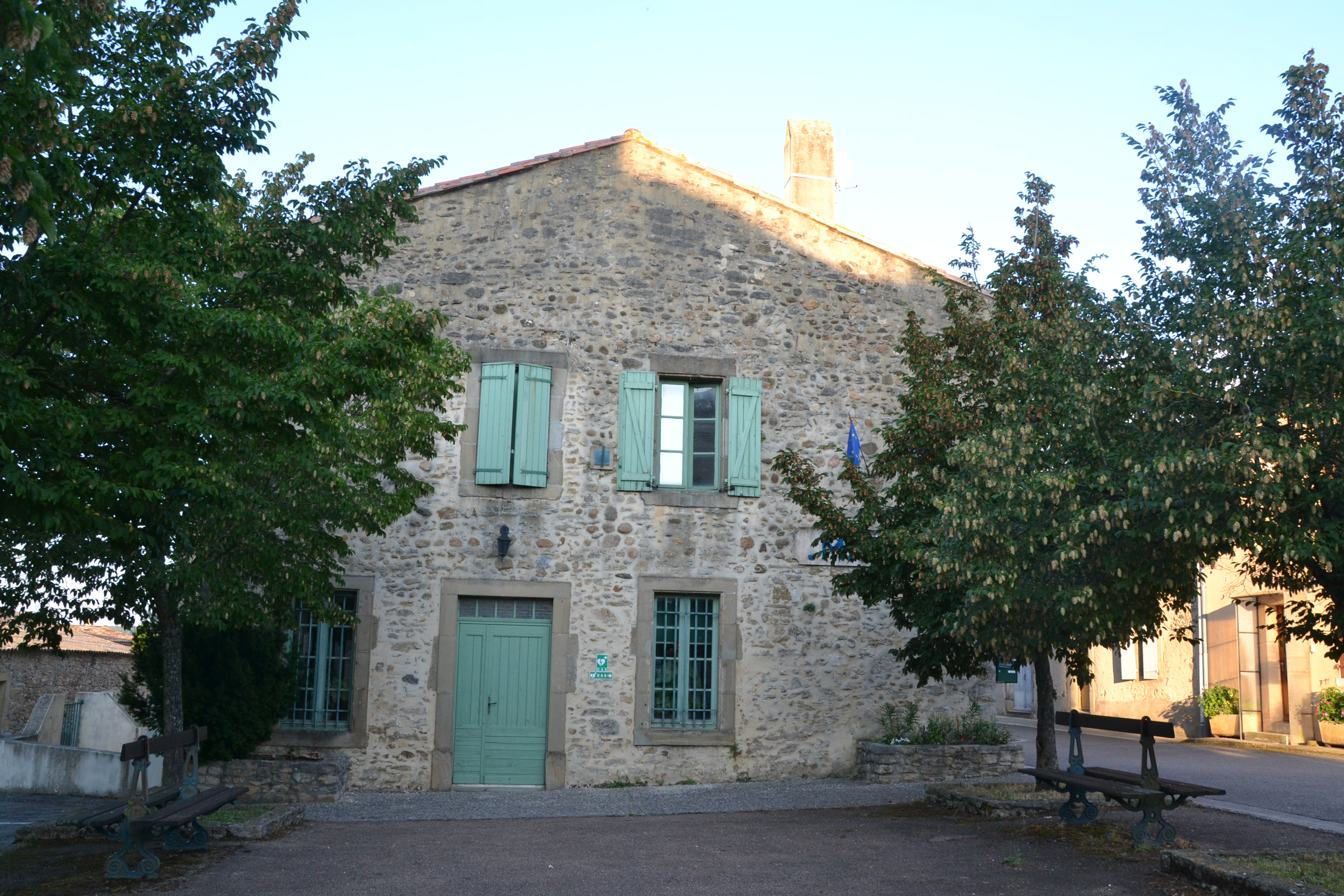
- The town hall in Caudeval
- Location of Val-de-Lambronne
- Location within France Location within Occitanie
- Coordinates: 43°04′30″N 1°58′34″E
- Country: France
- Region: Occitania
- Department: Aude
- Arrondissement: Limoux
- Canton: La Haute-Vallée de l'Aude

Government
  - Mayor (2022–2026): Sylvie Bringuier
- Area^{1}: 12.0 km^{2} (4.6 sq mi)
- Population (2023): 180
  - Density: 15/km^{2} (39/sq mi)
- Time zone: UTC+01:00 (CET)
  - Summer (DST): UTC+02:00 (CEST)
- INSEE/Postal code: 11080 /11230
- ^{1} French Land Register data, which excludes lakes, ponds, glaciers > 1 km^{2} (0.386 sq mi or 247 acres) and river estuaries.

Val-de-Lambronne (French pronunciation: [val də lɑ̃bʁɔn]; Occitan: Valh d'Ambrona) is a commune in the Aude department of southern France. The municipality was established on 1 January 2016 by merger of the former communes of Caudeval and Gueytes-et-Labastide.

== See also ==
- Communes of the Aude department
