= Gueytes-et-Labastide =

Part of Val-de-Lambronne in Occitanie, France

- Part of Val-de-Lambronne
- Location of Gueytes-et-Labastide
- Location within France Location within Occitanie
- Coordinates: 43°04′11″N 2°00′25″E
- Country: France
- Region: Occitania
- Department: Aude
- Arrondissement: Limoux
- Canton: Quillan
- Commune: Val-de-Lambronne
- Area^{1}: 4.81 km^{2} (1.86 sq mi)
- Elevation: 359 m (1,178 ft)
- Highest elevation: 500 m (1,600 ft)
- Lowest elevation: 340 m (1,120 ft)
- Population (2023): 25
  - Density: 5.2/km^{2} (13/sq mi)
- Time zone: UTC+01:00 (CET)
  - Summer (DST): UTC+02:00 (CEST)
- Postal code: 11230
- ^{1} French Land Register data, which excludes lakes, ponds, glaciers > 1 km^{2} (0.386 sq mi or 247 acres) and river estuaries.

Gueytes-et-Labastide (French pronunciation: [ɡɛt e labastid]; Languedocien: Guèitas e La Bastida) is a former commune in the Aude department in southern France. On 1 January 2016 it was merged into the new commune of Val-de-Lambronne.

== See also ==
- Communes of the Aude department
