= Ironic Universe =

2006 studio / live album by Janet Feder and Fred Frith

Studio album / Live album by Janet Feder and Fred Frith
- Released: January 1, 2006
- Recorded: February 20, 2004 and May 11, 2006 (live set)
- Venue: Boulder and Denver, Colorado
- Genre: Experimental music, free improvisation
- Length: 77:45
- Label: Ad Hoc (US)

Fred Frith chronology
| Duo (Victoriaville) 2005 (2006) | Ironic Universe (2006) | Impur (2006) |

Ironic Universe is a 2006 double album of prepared guitar music by Janet Feder and Fred Frith. It comprises a studio CD of solo tracks by Feder and duo improvisations by Feder and Frith, and a live DVD of solo performances by Frith and Feder filmed in Colorado. It was released by Dave Kerman's Ad Hoc Records on January 1, 2006.

== Reception ==
Professional ratings
Review scores
| Source | Rating |
|---|---|
| All About Jazz | 4.5/5 stars |
| AllMusic | 4/5 stars |

In a review at AllMusic, Rick Anderson described Ironic Universe as "[b]eautiful". He was impressed with Feder's solo pieces, adding that her "[un]traditional playing methods" produce sounds that are "startling but always strangely beautiful". Anderson was more impressed with her duos with Frith, which he said worked well because of the guitarists' "surprising level of musical empathy".

Glenn Astarita wrote in a review of the album in All About Jazz that the duo's "congenial set" of "avant frameworks" is "truly fascinating". He said parts of their performance reminded him of John Fahey's "complex chord phrasings". Astarita added that Frith's solo set on the DVD "adds credence to his stature as one of the great improvisers of our time". In another review in All About Jazz, Nic Jones said Feder and Frith's six duets are the album's highlights, and that while "there's ... plenty here for both the ears and the eyes", he found the predominance of solo performances "a little frustrating", adding that he hoped that next time the pair could "properly get together".

Writing in Exposé, K. Leimer said on Ironic Universe the "experimental inflections" of the prepared guitar balance almost perfectly with the "radiant graces of traditional and non-traditional scales and tunings". He said the blending of these two contrasts will "convert any skeptic" of the relevance of treated instruments. Leimer described the album as "beautiful without simply being pretty", and added that the contrast between Feder and Frith's solo and duo performances "provides an excellent structural metaphor for the way in which the music itself is built".

== Track listing ==
CD
| No. | Title | Writer(s) | Length |
|---|---|---|---|
| 1. | "Opening" | Janet Feder | 4:25 |
| 2. | "Heart Beat Faster" | Feder, Fred Frith | 4:20 |
| 3. | "Torn" | Feder, Frith | 0:54 |
| 4. | "Short Story" | Feder | 3:17 |
| 5. | "See You on the Beach" | Feder, Frith | 1:11 |
| 6. | "Loose Slots" | Feder | 3:23 |
| 7. | "Six of One" | Feder, Frith | 1:16 |
| 8. | "Cricket" | Feder | 4:08 |
| 9. | "Hover" | Feder, Frith | 2:10 |
| 10. | "Waking the Day" | Feder | 3:07 |
| 11. | "Blue State" | Feder | 3:39 |
| 12. | "Closing" | Feder, Frith | 6:03 |
| Total length: | | | 37:53 |

DVD
| No. | Title | Writer(s) | Length |
|---|---|---|---|
| 13. | Untitled | Frith | 26:31 |
| 14. | "Opening" | Feder | 4:45 |
| 15. | "I Hear Voices" | Feder | 3:43 |
| 16. | "Heart Beat Faster" | Feder | 4:53 |
| Total length: | | | 39:52 |

Sources: Liner notes, Discogs, Fred Frith discography.

== Personnel ==
- Janet Feder – prepared guitars (tracks 1–12, 14–16)
- Fred Frith – prepared guitars (tracks 2, 3, 5, 7, 12, 13)

Sources: Liner notes, Discogs, Fred Frith discography, Bandcamp.

=== Sound and artwork ===
- Tracks 1–12 recorded, mixed and mastered by Colin Bricker in Denver, Colorado
- Track 13 filmed by David Quint in Boulder, Colorado on February 20, 2004
- Tracks 14–16 filmed by David Quint in Denver, Colorado on May 11, 2006
- Photography by Eric Paddock

Sources: Liner notes, Discogs, Fred Frith discography, Bandcamp.
