= Bass Outlaws =

- Origin: Miami, Florida, United States
- Genres: Miami bass, Electro
- Years active: 1992–1999
- Labels: Newtown Records, Backstage Productions
- Past members: Techmaster P.E.B.

Bass Outlaws was a Miami bass music group that released their first album in 1992 on Newtown Records. Bass Outlaws released 4 studio albums. Their first album Illegal Bass peaked at 48 on the Billboard charts.

== Discography ==
=== Studio albums ===
| Year | Album | Label | Peak Chart |
|---|---|---|---|
| 1992 | "Illegal Bass" | Newtown Records | 48 |
| 1994 | "Busted" | Newtown Records | |
| 1997 | "Feel the Bass" | Newtown Records | |
| 1999 | "Outlawed Bass" | Newtown Records | |
