= Janet Feder =

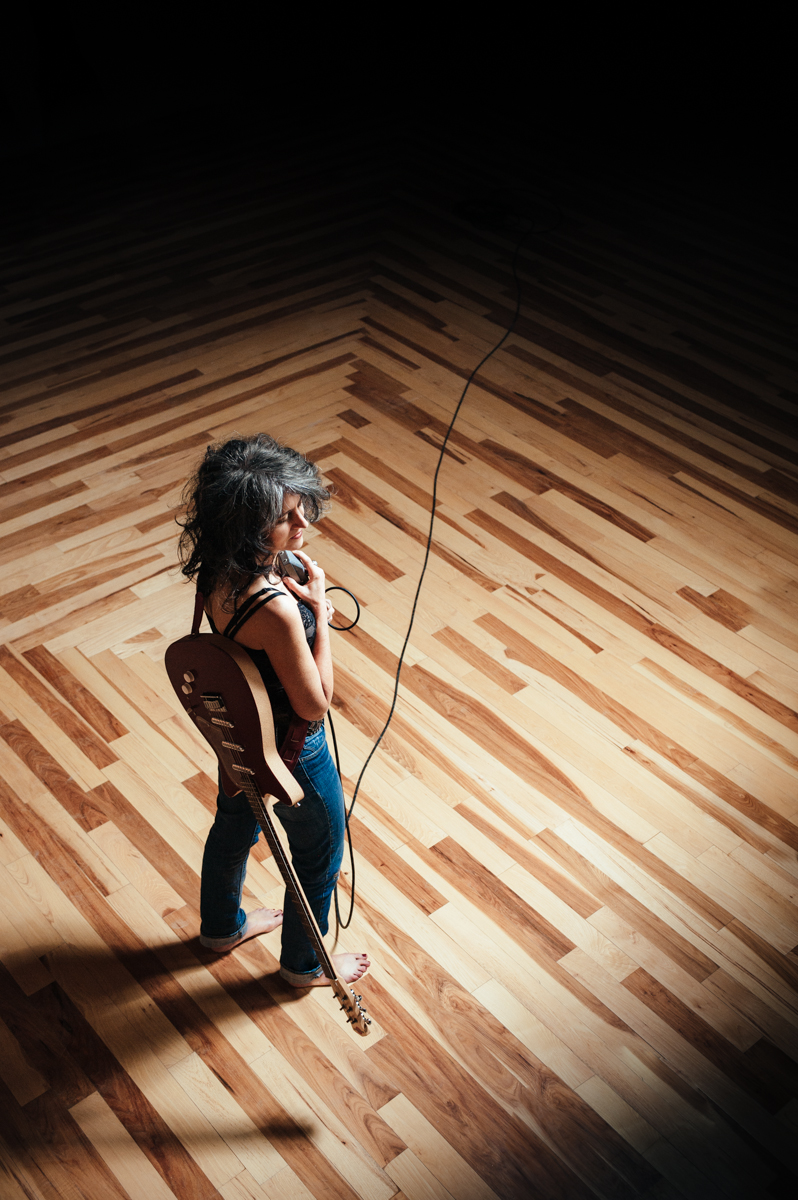

Background information
- Genres: Avant-Garde, Experimental
- Occupation: Musician
- Instruments: Baritone guitar, guitar
- Website: janetfeder.com

Janet Feder is a Denver, Colorado based guitarist, collaborator, and educator. She is best known for her work in the prepared guitar genre. In addition, Janet Feder is: a lecturer at the University of Colorado; co-founder and co-curator of the annual international new media festival MediaLive (2012-2017) in Boulder, Colorado. She is also an Artistic Associate of Square Product Theatre, and a facilitator with Grapefruit Lab's Action Change Theater Ensemble, a prison arts program.

== Biography ==
Most recent releases include in.cantations, improvised duos with Jane Rigler, flutes (2025); and Break It Like This with Colin Bricker, laptop and electronics as their duo cowhause (2024). In 2020 Janet joined the supergroup Sorry For Laughing, composed of Gordon Whitlow (Biota), Edward Ka-Spel (Legendary Pink Dots), Martyn Bates (Eyeless in Gaza), Patrick Q-Wright (Amanda Palmer and Edward Ka-Spel), Dave-id Busaras (Virgin Prunes).

Solo projects include T H I S C L O S E (2015), Songs with Words (2012), Ironic Universe, a CD & DVD featuring Fred Frith (AdHoc Records/USA 2006), and Speak Puppet (Recommended Records/UK 2001), as well as compilations for Zerx Records (Albuquerque, NM; 1999-07) and the compilation The $100 Guitar Project (Bridge Records, 2012). She also appears on Jane Rigler's Rarefactions (Neuma 2015) and Honey Barbara's Wave Grass (2015), in addition to 156 Strings produced by Henry Kaiser for Cuneiform Records (USA, 2002) and I Never Meta Guitar produced by Elliott Sharp for Clean Feed Records (Portugal, 2010), both featuring guitar players from around the globe.

In conjunction with Paul Fowler, Feder composed the film score Leavings (2014), plus the score and sound design for the Square Product Theatre adaptation of Selah Saterstrom's novel SLAB.

Feder was one of several contributors to Paul Riola's Bottesini Project, where her work was featured alongside Nels Cline, Keenan Wayne, CacheFlowe, Glenn Taylor, and Mark Harris on the 2009 album Naima's Grass Pajamas. The album began as "collective improvisations recorded live in the studio" which "were then later reconstructed."

T H I S C L O S E (2015) and Songs With Words (2012) were both recorded live at Immersive Studios in Boulder, Colorado in DSD Pure on Gus Skinas' 32 channel Sonoma System and are currently available on both vinyl and SACD. There are no digital effects on either Songs With Words or T H I S C L O S E. A reviewer noted that Songs With Words "explores the outer reaches of sonic possibility yet never loses the thread of melody and beauty" while T H I S C L O S E has been described as "Feder's most fully realized album...Unique and highly moving music."

Previously the Chair of the Music Department at Naropa University in Boulder, Colorado, Feder has performed or collaborated with Fred Frith, Nels Cline, Henry Kaiser, Bill Frisell, Elliott Sharp, Mike Keneally, Bryan Beller, Amy Denio, Chris Cutler, Mike Johnson/Thinking Plague, Susie Asado, Nikmat Hatraktor, Paolo Angeli, Wu Fei, Thomas Dimuzzio, Tatsuya Nakatani, Erin McKeown, Jane Rigler, Shoko Nagai, Satoshi Takeishi, James Sidlo, Pauline Oliveros and poet Anne Waldman.

Feder's solo work was featured in a June 2012 Tiny Desk Concert on NPR.

== Discography ==
Solo:

- T H I S C L O S E (2015)
- Songs With Words (2012)
- Speak Puppet (2000)
- icyimi (1994)

With Paul Fowler:

- Leavings (2014)

With Fred Frith:

- Ironic Universe (2006)

With Various Artists

- $100 Guitar Project (2013)
- I Never Meta Guitar (2010)
- Xerx Records (1999-2007)
