= New Faces (band) =

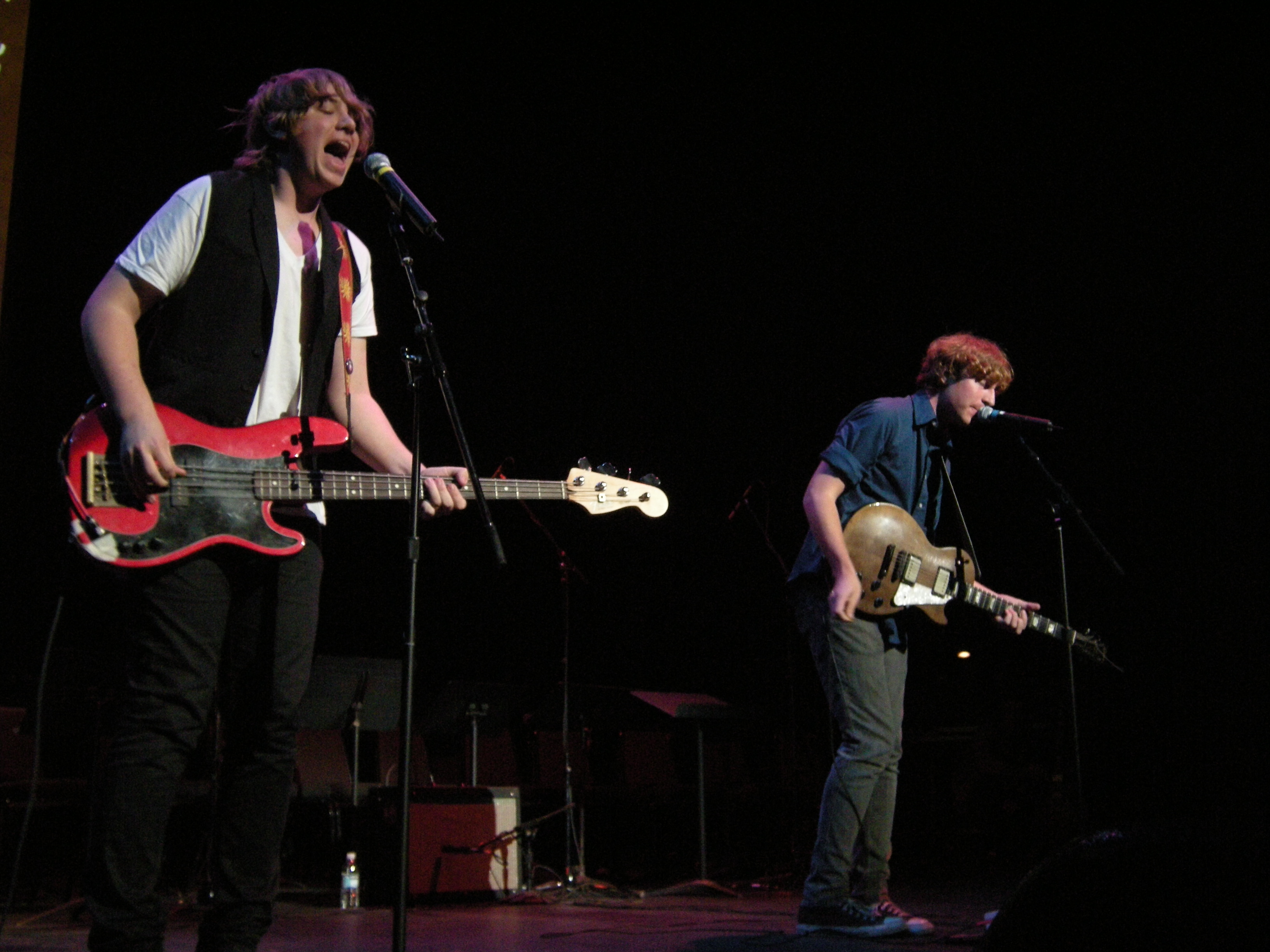
- New Faces in 2008

Background information
- Origin: Port Townsend, Washington, USA
- Genres: Britpop
- Years active: 2007–2009
- Label: Loveless Records
- Members: Nico Janssen; Kyle Hove; Conor Sisk
- Website: myspace.com/newfacesband

New Faces were a Britpop-influenced band, formed in Port Townsend, Washington in 2006 as Captain Incognito. The band was received well, and won Seattle's local under-21 music competition, Sound Off!. The band is also the youngest band to be signed by Seattle-based Loveless Records. The band released two singles off their first album, Two Years, on July 22, 2008, before releasing the full album on August 26 of the same year.

The band has played with acts such as Blue Scholars and Schoolyard Heroes, and has been aired on Seattle music station KEXP-FM and on KNDD (locally known as 107.7 The End).

The band's music has appeared on television, with appearances on NBC, including Mercy and The Philanthropist. More recently, the band's music has been licensed for use in a television commercial, airing in Mexico, for Converse (shoe company).
