= Caudeval =

Part of Val-de-Lambronne in Occitanie, France

- Part of Val-de-Lambronne
- Coat of arms
- Location of Caudeval
- Location within France Location within Occitanie
- Coordinates: 43°04′32″N 1°58′32″E
- Country: France
- Region: Occitania
- Department: Aude
- Arrondissement: Limoux
- Canton: Quillan
- Commune: Val-de-Lambronne
- Area^{1}: 7.19 km^{2} (2.78 sq mi)
- Highest elevation: 530 m (1,740 ft)
- Lowest elevation: 314 m (1,030 ft)
- Population (2013): 163
  - Density: 22.7/km^{2} (58.7/sq mi)
- Time zone: UTC+01:00 (CET)
  - Summer (DST): UTC+02:00 (CEST)
- Postal code: 11230
- ^{1} French Land Register data, which excludes lakes, ponds, glaciers > 1 km^{2} (0.386 sq mi or 247 acres) and river estuaries.

Caudeval (French pronunciation: [kodval]; Languedocien: Caudavalh) is a former commune in the Aude department in southern France. On 1 January 2016, it was merged into the new commune of Val-de-Lambronne.

== See also ==
- Communes of the Aude department
