= Progman Cometh =

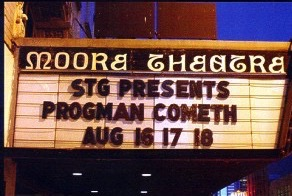

Progman Cometh Music Festivals were two Canterbury scene music concerts held at the Moore Theatre in Seattle, Washington, USA, in 2002 and 2003.

== Progman Cometh 2002 ==
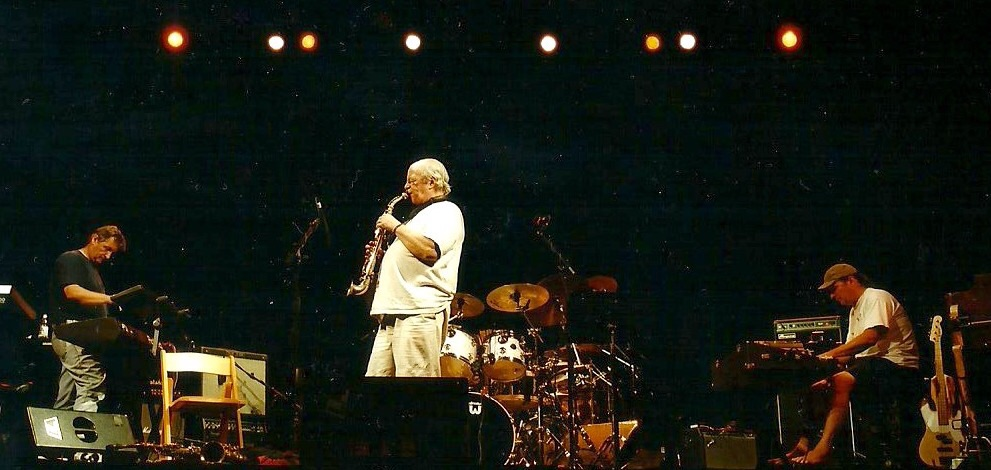
Elton Dean performing with Glass

=== Friday, August 16 ===
- 7:00pm Glass (with friends)
- 8:30pm Hughscore
- 10:00pm Pip Pyle's Bash! – world debut

=== Saturday, August 17 ===
- 1:00pm Hamster Theatre – first performance outside Colorado
- 2:15pm Richard Sinclair
- 4:00pm Phreeworld
- 6:30pm Kopecky
- 8:00pm Richard Sinclair and David Rees-Williams
- 9:30pm Soft Works – world debut

=== Sunday, August 18 ===
- 2:00pm Stinkhorn
- 3:00pm David Rees-Williams
- 4:30pm Azigza
- 7:00pm Phil Miller's In Cahoots
- 8:30pm Daevid Allen's University of Errors (with Kevin Ayers)
- 10:00pm All Star Jam (everyone who is still in town and has any energy left)

==== Notes ====
Gordon Beck was scheduled to appear but had to cancel at the last minute due to illness. Akinetón Retard (from Chile) were also scheduled but were prevented from leaving Chile by customs. The "friends" appearing with Glass were William Kopecky, Joe Kopecky and Elton Dean. Soft Works (billed as "Software" before their name change) consisted of Hugh Hopper, Allan Holdsworth, Elton Dean and John Marshall. Mike Ratledge was invited to Progman, but declined to attend, even as a spectator. Robert Wyatt's health prevented him from travelling.

==== Releases ====
- Hamster Theatre's performance was later released on their double-CD The Public Execution of Mister Personality / Quasi Day Room: Live at the Moore Theatre
- Two songs from the performance of Pip Pyle's Bash were released on Pip's CD Belle Illusion
- The performance by Glass was released as Glass Live At Progman Cometh
- Highlights from the 2002 festival were released as Canterburied in Seattle 2002 on Glass's Bandcamp page
- The entire 2003 festival (less Procol Harum and Alan Parsons) was released on Glass's Bandcamp page

== Progman Cometh 2003 ==
=== Saturday, August 2 ===
- 5:00pm Two Monkey Finger (Two Monkey Finger consisted of different musicians for different songs—see below)
- 9:00pm The Alan Parsons Project

==== Two Monkey Finger Set #1 ====
Artist / Song	Bass	Guitar	Keys	2nd Keys	2nd Guitar	2nd Bass	Horn	Vocals	Drums	2nd Drums
Jeff Sherman & Friends / Big Sur 9-14-2000	Jeff Sherman		Greg Sherman	Jim Smiley		Hugh Hopper		Richard Sinclair	Jerry Cook	Paul Black
Glass / Give The Man A Hand	Jeff Sherman		Greg Sherman						Jerry Cook	
Fred Baker / For Birgit		Fred Baker								
Fred Baker / Seattle Samba		Fred Baker								
Johann Sebastian Bach / Toccata in D Minor	Fred Baker									
Fred Baker / Bonneville Blues	Fred Baker									
Fred Baker / unidentified loop bass piece	Fred Baker									
Phil Miller / Underdub	Richard Sinclair	Phil Miller			Fred Baker					
Phil Miller, Robert Wyatt / God Song	Richard Sinclair	Phil Miller			Fred Baker			Richard Sinclair		
Phil Miller / Eastern Region	Richard Sinclair	Phil Miller			Fred Baker					
Elton Dean / Willy The Knee			Alex Maguire				Elton Dean			
Hugh Hopper / Kings and Queens	Hugh Hopper	Phil Miller	Alex Maguire		Fred Baker		Elton Dean		Jerry Cook	Paul Black
Hugh Hopper / Wanglosaxon	Hugh Hopper	Phil Miller	Alex Maguire		Fred Baker		Elton Dean		Jerry Cook	Paul Black
Richard Sinclair / Share It	Richard Sinclair	Phil Miller	Alex Maguire	Greg Sherman				Richard Sinclair	Jerry Cook	Paul Black
Phil Miller / Calyx	Richard Sinclair	Phil Miller	Alex Maguire	Greg Sherman			Elton Dean	Richard Sinclair	Jerry Cook	Paul Black
Hugh Hopper / First Trane	Hugh Hopper	Phil Miller	Alex Maguire		Fred Baker		Elton Dean		Jerry Cook	Paul Black
Hugh Hopper, D C Seager / Long Lingers Autumn Time	Hugh Hopper				Fred Baker	Richard Sinclair		Richard Sinclair		
Alex Maguire / John's Fragment	Hugh Hopper	Phil Miller	Alex Maguire		Fred Baker		Elton Dean		Jerry Cook	Paul Black
Alex Maguire / Psychic Warrior	Hugh Hopper	Phil Miller	Alex Maguire		Fred Baker		Elton Dean	Richard Sinclair	Jerry Cook	Paul Black

=== Sunday, August 3 ===
- 5:00pm Two Monkey Finger
- 7:30pm Steve Smith / Michael Zilber Quartet
- 9:30pm Procol Harum

==== Two Monkey Finger Set #2 ====
Artist / Song	Bass	Guitar	Keys	2nd Bass	2nd Guitar	Horn	Vocals	Drums	2nd Drums
Coughlan, Hastings, Sinclair, Sinclair / In The Land of Grey and Pink		Richard Sinclair					Richard Sinclair		
Richard Sinclair / Going For A Song		Richard Sinclair					Richard Sinclair		
Richard Sinclair / Keep On Caring		Richard Sinclair					Richard Sinclair		
Richard Sinclair / What's Rattlin'		Richard Sinclair					Richard Sinclair	Paul Black	
Richard Sinclair / Latiny Tune		Richard Sinclair	Greg Sherman				Richard Sinclair	Paul Black	
Richard Sinclair / Oh What A Lonely Lifetime / Disassociation		Richard Sinclair					Richard Sinclair		
Phil Miller / Out There	Fred Baker	Phil Miller							
Phil Miller / Upside	Fred Baker	Phil Miller							
Glass / Europa	Jeff Sherman		Greg Sherman					Jerry Cook	
Fred Baker / Baker's Treat	Hugh Hopper	Fred Baker			Phil Miller	Elton Dean		Jerry Cook	Paul Black
Hugh Hopper, Phil Miller / Facelift / Nan True's Hole / Green and Purple	Hugh Hopper	Fred Baker	Alex Maguire	Richard Sinclair	Phil Miller	Elton Dean		Jerry Cook	Paul Black
