= Lars Hollmer =

Swedish accordionist, keyboardist and composer (1948–2008)

Lars Gustav Gabriel Hollmer
- Born: 21 July 1948; Linköping
- Died: 25 December 2008 (aged 60); Uppsala
- Occupation: Composer

Lars Gustav Gabriel Hollmer (21 July 1948 – 25 December 2008) was a Swedish accordionist, keyboardist and composer, whose work drew on music ranging from Nordic folk tunes to progressive rock. He has been a member and/or founder of over half a dozen groups, most of whose work has been recorded at The Chickenhouse, his well outfitted home studio in his hometown of Uppsala. His work with the band Samla Mammas Manna, in the late 1960s and early 1970s and up to 2002, when the re-formed group played at the two-day ProgDay festival in North Carolina, was and is considered progressive rock. However, he was most centrally an empathetic and generous collaborator: whether as a member of Accordion Tribe, while working with the experimental guitarist Fred Frith, or while spending several months with Japanese jazz players, he seemed to find a style that brought his partners to the fore while remaining identifiably himself. Though his work is little known in the United States, he won a Swedish Grammis award in 1999 for his record Andetag. He has also composed extensively for Swedish film, as well as for theatre and dance productions. Consistent elements of his music throughout his career included use of irregular time signatures (often changing several times within a piece), a daring sense of improvisation (particularly vocal improvisation that utilized nonsense syllables), and used complex polyrhythms.

Hollmer died in December 2008 of cancer, aged 60. He is buried in Berthåga Cemetery in Uppsala.

== Discography ==
=== With Samla Mammas Manna ===
- Samla Mammas Manna 1971
- Måltid 1973
- Klossa Knapitatet 1974
- Snorungarnas Symfoni 1976
- Kaka 1999
- Dear mamma 2002

=== With Zamla Mammaz Manna ===
- Schlagerns Mystik / För Äldre Nybegynnare (The Mystery of Popular Music / For Older Beginners) 1977
- Familjesprickor (Family Cracks) 1980

=== With von Zamla ===
- Zamlaranamma 1982
- "1983" (Live) 1983
- No Make Up 1984

=== With Ramlösa Kvällar ===
- Ramlösa Kvällar (Nights Without Frames) 1977

=== With Fem Söker En Skatt ===
- Fem Söker En Skatt 1995

=== With Looping Home Orchestra ===
- Vendeltid 1987
- Lars Hollmer. Looping Home Orchestra Live 92–93 (DOOR FLOOR SOMETHING WINDOW) 1994

=== With Accordion Tribe ===
- Accordion Tribe (live, 1998)
- Sea of Reeds (2002)
- Lunghorn Twist (2006)

=== With Japanese jazz players ===
- SOLA 2000

=== With Fanfare Pourpour ===
- Karusell musik 2007

=== With Lindsay Cooper, Fred Frith and Gianni Gebbia ===
- Angels on the Edge of Time (2015, CD, I Dischi di Angelica, Italy) – recorded at the 1992 Angelica Festival

=== Solo albums ===
- XII Sibiriska Cyklar 1981
- Vill Du Höra Mer 1982
- Från Natt Idag 1983
- Joggingcharleston (Single, 1984)
- Tonöga 1985
- The Siberian Circus 1993
- Vandelmässa 1995
- Andetag 1998
- Utsikter 2000
- Autokomp A(nd) More 2001
- Viandra 2007
- Med mjölad hand (skisser) 2012
