= Bob Drake (musician) =

American musician and recording engineer (born 1957)

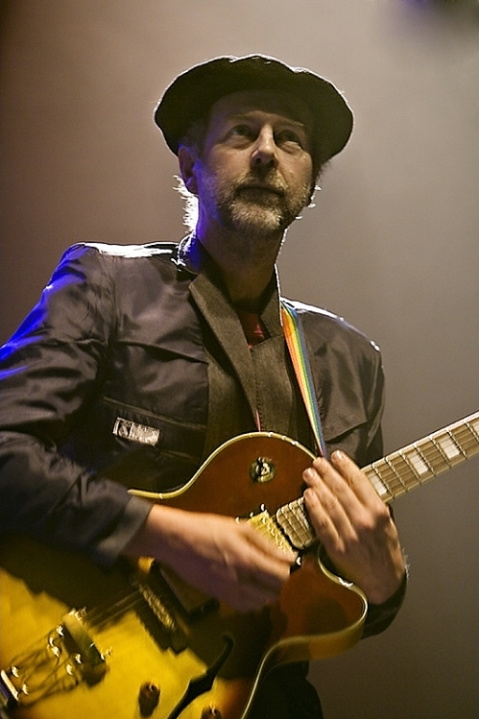
- Bob Drake with the Peter Blegvad Trio performing at a Rock in Opposition Festival in Southern France in April 2007.

Background information
- Born: December 6, 1957 (age 68); Cleveland, Ohio, United States
- Genres: Avant-rock, experimental
- Occupations: Musician, recording engineer
- Instruments: Percussion, bass guitar, guitar, keyboards, violin, vocals
- Years active: 1970s–present
- Label: Recommended
- Website: www.bdrak.com

Bob Drake (born December 6, 1957) is an American multi-instrumentalist musician and recording engineer. He was a founding member of the avant-rock band Thinking Plague in the early 1980s, and a member of the 5uu's, Hail and The Science Group (with Chris Cutler, Stevan Kovacs Tickmayer and Fred Frith). He formed his own band, Bob Drake's Cabinet of Curiosities in 2007. Drake's engineering credits include mainstream artists like Ice Cube, Tina Turner and Engelbert Humperdinck.

Drake has released a number of solo albums, all written, performed and recorded by himself. François Couture at AllMusic described each successive album as "a more twisted aural journey than the previous one".

== Biography ==
Bob Drake was born in Cleveland, Ohio on December 6, 1957, and spent his youth in Watseka, Illinois. There he taught himself how to play guitar and drums, but after hearing Yes's Fragile in 1972, Drake decided he wanted to be a bassist and bought himself a Rickenbacker 4001 bass guitar, which he still uses today. Henry Cow also had a big influence on him: "[T]hey were doing something I felt was a lot closer to what I was imagining I'd like to do – 'complex' intricate songs and arrangements, noisy things going on which fit organically in the music, and less emphasis on 'perfect' studio overcooked impersonal perfection."

Drake experimented with recording techniques and "warped rock", but soon found that no one was interested in "new and strange music" in his rural Midwestern home town. He moved to Denver, Colorado in 1978 where he worked for a while as a sound engineer on B horror movie sets. He also spent time recording local underground bands and playing bass guitar and drums with some of them. Drake put an advertisement at a local music store requesting a guitar player "into Henry Cow, Yes …", and met up with experimental rock guitarist and composer Mike Johnson. Drake and Johnson played in a few cover bands before forming Thinking Plague in 1982. By 1990 Thinking Plague had recorded three albums and established a name for themselves in progressive circles.

In the late 1980s the Denver music scene "just evaporated" as musicians seeking "greener pastures" moved elsewhere. Drake, "flat broke" at the time, moved to Los Angeles where he found a job as a recording engineer. There he established a name for himself working with several mainstream artists like Ice Cube, Tina Turner and Engelbert Humperdinck. During this time he also formed an alternative rock group, Hail with ex-Thinking Plague's singer Susanne Lewis, and joined Dave Kerman's avant rock group, the 5uu's. Hunger's Teeth, the 5uu's' third album was praised for its "challenging music" and "production values", and made Drake a "sought-after engineer and collaborator".

Drake released his first solo album, What Day is It? in 1994. It was a limited edition (1,000 copies) self released record that Drake pressed himself. He later made five more solo albums, which were all released on ex-Henry Cow drummer Chris Cutler's UK independent record label, Recommended Records. In 1994 Drake and Kerman moved to an old farm house owned by Cutler and Henry Cow's sound engineer EM (Maggie) Thomas in Caudeval, southern France. They converted it into a studio which they called Studio Midi-Pyrenees. Later Drake worked closely with Cutler on a number of projects for Recommended Records, including the remastering of several albums and box sets, for example The Art Box (2004) and The 40th Anniversary Henry Cow Box Set (2009). He also joined Cutler's avant-rock band The Science Group in 1997, in which he played and engineered/produced the group's two albums.

Drake continued to work on and off in the 2000s with Thinking Plague and the 5uu's. In 2007 he formed his own group, Bob Drake's Cabinet of Curiosities to perform material from his solo albums live on stage. The group comprised Drake (guitar, vocals, violin, banjo), Kerman (drums), David Campbell (guitar, bass guitar, vocals) and Jason DuMars (soprano/alto saxophones, keyboards). They played at NEARfest in Pennsylvania in June 2007 with guests Olivier Tejedor (keyboards) and Lynnette Shelley (vocals).

== Solo albums ==
Drake recorded six solo albums between 1994 and 2005. Musician and writer Dominique Leone at Pitchfork Media described them as "idiosyncratic to a fault", with songs unlike anything else he has heard. Drake plays almost all the instruments himself, and the music has elements of progressive rock, country/blues and "bizarro pop".

Drake said that his first album, What Day is It? (1994) was influenced by "the climate, the deserts, the dusty hills around L.A.", and that his next one, Little Black Train (1998), largely an instrumental album, was "dirtier and messier" than the first. Medallion Animal Carpet (1999) consisted of different musical ideas strung together around a "medley of noisy country-ish songs", and The Skull Mailbox and Other Horrors (2001), recorded in a barn, was a collection of little "horror songs" played on a nylon stringed classical guitar and a "cheap little organ".

Leone described Skull Mailbox as a "folk-horror-avant-semi-classical hybrid", and a "mix of psychological stress, garage-symphony grandeur and folk-ish retelling of very familiar horror stories". He also described The Shunned Country (2005) as a "rural horror story", saying that the 40-minute album contains 52 brief tracks that "employ as tight a form into the most compact space as possible". Banjos feature prominently that sound like "macabre-sentimental fanfares, Deliverance in the hands of Hitchcock".

== Solo discography ==
- What Day is It? (1994, self released)
- Little Black Train (1998, Recommended Records)
- Medallion Animal Carpet (1999, Recommended Records)
- The Skull Mailbox and Other Horrors (2001, Recommended Records)
- 13 Songs and a Thing (2003, Recommended Records)
- The Shunned Country (2005, Recommended Records)
- Bob's Drive-In (2011, Recommended Records)
- Lawn Ornaments (2014, Recommended Records)
- ...come at once, ANTIQUITIES! (2014, Recommended Records) – box set containing Little Black Train, The Skull Mailbox, 13 Songs and a Thing, The Shunned Country and Bob’s Drive-In
- Arx Pilosa (2016)
- L'Isola dei Lupi (2018)
- The Gardens of Beastley Manor (2019)
- Planets and Animals (2020)
- Legendary Lore Of The Holy Wells Of England (2022)
- The Room in the Tower (2023)

== As a member of other bands discography ==
- Venus Handcuffs – Venus Handcuffs (2004, Ad Hoc Records)
- The Capybaras – Stropicalia (2013, Cremíre Is Mó Records)
- Bing Selfish and the Multiverts – In the Morning We Glow and in the Evening We Glow Again (2016, El Frenzy)
- Peter Blegvad – Go Figure (2019, ReR Megacorp)

== See also ==
- Romantic Warriors II: A Progressive Music Saga About Rock in Opposition
- Romantic Warriors II: Special Features DVD
