= Thinking Plague =

American avant-rock group

- Thinking Plague in 1998; left to right: Dave Kerman, Dave Willey, Deborah Perry, Mark Harris, Shane Hotle, Mike Johnson

Background information
- Origin: Denver, Colorado, United States
- Genres: Experimental rock, progressive rock
- Years active: 1982–present
- Labels: Recommended, Cuneiform
- Members: Mike Johnson; Mark Harris; Dave Willey; Elaine Difalco; Bill Pohl; Robin Chestnut
- Past members: Bob Drake; Sharon Bradford; Harry Fleishman; Rick Arsenault; Mark Fuller; Susanne Lewis; Eric Moon; Lawrence Haugseth; Shane Hotle; Maria Moran; Dave Kerman; Deborah Perry; Matt Mitchell; David Shamrock; Kimara Sajn
- Website: www.thinkingplague.org

Thinking Plague is an American avant-garde progressive rock group founded in 1982 by guitarist/composer Mike Johnson and bass guitarist/drummer Bob Drake. Based in Denver, Colorado, the band has been active off and on since 1982, taking on a number of musicians over the years. They have made seven studio albums between 1984 and 2017, and released one live album recorded at NEARfest in 2000.

Their music is a mix of rock, folk, jazz and 20th-century classical music. Music.com remarked that "...Thinking Plague stand out as a shining example of avant-garde music blended with just enough rock for it to be called progressive rock..."

While never directly related to Rock in Opposition (RIO), Thinking Plague was strongly influenced by this late-1970s movement, particularly Henry Cow and Art Bears. In spite of Johnson's dislike of the term, the band has often been categorized as a "RIO" band.

== History ==
=== Early Thinking Plague ===
Mike Johnson and Bob Drake first met and played in several cover bands. They began experimenting with basement recordings in 1980 and by 1982 they had enough song material to attempt a few live performances. For these shows they enlisted the services of classically trained vocalist Sharon Bradford, luthier Harry Fleishman on keyboards, and Rick Arsenault on drums. This ensemble became the first incarnation of Thinking Plague. They played at a few venues around Denver in 1983 but their complicated music was not well received and Johnson and Drake decided to make an album of their material instead.

With Bradford, Fleishman and Mark Fuller on drums the band worked on and off for almost a year recording their songs at a crude 8-track recording facility in the basement of an old slaughterhouse called the Packing House Studios. Having limited funds they did all the tracking and mixing themselves, and released the album, ...A Thinking Plague in 1984 on their own Endemic label. Only 500 LPs were pressed with each cover hand painted by Drake with spray-paint and a stencil. In spite of the small scale, low-tech quality of the release, a number of distributors, including Recommended Records and Wayside Music (Cuneiform Records) agreed to sell the album and it was well received by some critics.

In 1985 Johnson and Drake began to record material for a new Thinking Plague album. The Packing House Studios had closed but they had access to a few "low budget" recording facilities in Denver. Having disbanded the "Packing House" group after their first album, Johnson and Drake recruited a new band: singer-songwriter Susanne Lewis, drummer Mark Fuller and keyboardist Eric Moon. Disregarding, or ignorant of the proper "industry" way of doing things, Thinking Plague recorded their second album, Moonsongs. The title track was a fifteen-and-a-half minute "tribal-pagan-environmental-anti-materialistic avant-rock ritual" composed by Johnson. Initially Moonsongs was released in 1986 on cassette by Endemic, but the following year the band signed with Dead Man's Curve Records in London and Moonsongs was released on LP. As with their first album, Moonsongs was praised in "progressive" circles and Thinking Plague enhanced their stature as an avant-rock band.

Riding on the success of their two albums, Thinking Plague performed a series of live shows in 1987 in Denver, opening for Sonic Youth at one of them. Pianist/clarinetist Lawrence Haugseth joined the band for the live performances, but left in early 1988. Haugseth's brief stay did, however, establish the need for a woodwind/reed section in the band. Fuller and Moon had also left the band in late 1987, which prompted the acquisition of three new musicians: classical pianist, Shane Hotle, bassist Maria Moran, and Mark Harris on clarinet, saxophones and flutes. Drake switched from bass guitar to drums.

=== In This Life ===
Recording for a new album began in early 1988 in various studios, including a large rehearsal room in an old yogurt factory (referred to as the Yog Factory). Johnson and Lewis had collaborated on a collection of songs for the album, which featured several "new" instruments, including sampler, tabla, various African and Balinese percussion instruments, and a fiddle (courtesy Bob Drake). Ex-Henry Cow guitarist Fred Frith guested on one track, "Organism (version II)", the original version (also with Frith) having been released on Recommended Records' RēR Records Quarterly Vol.2 No.4. Drake did all the production work and the album, In This Life was finished in mid-1988. At the time ex-Henry Cow drummer and Recommended Records founder, Chris Cutler was on tour with Pere Ubu in Denver and Johnson gave Cutler a cassette tape of the new album. Cutler offered to release it on the Recommended label, and in September 1989, In This Life became the first US-made CD on the British label.

In This Life was widely distributed and began "gaining kudos from aficionados of avant rock from all around the world." But Thinking Plague's euphoria was short lived when Lewis moved to New York City. Attempts to replace her with a local singer were unsuccessful and working "long distance" with her proved impractical at the time. Disillusioned, Drake relocated to Los Angeles to work as an engineer and producer, and Moran left the band, leaving Thinking Plague at the point of disintegrating.

In Los Angeles, Drake met drummer Dave Kerman of an avant-rock band, the 5uu's and began working with Kerman's band. Kerman's interest in Thinking Plague led to him joining the Denver band. Drake and Lewis also agreed to "rejoin" (despite the distances) and with the other remaining members, Johnson, Harris and Hotle, Thinking Plague "reformed" in 1990. For the next few years the band worked intermittently at some long-distance rehearsals, performed in a few concerts and made some new recordings, after which all work was put on hold. During this period of dormancy Johnson toured across Europe in 1995 with Drake, Kerman and the 5uu's, but upon returning to the United States the three agreed that reviving Thinking Plague again was not a practical option.

=== Rebirth ===
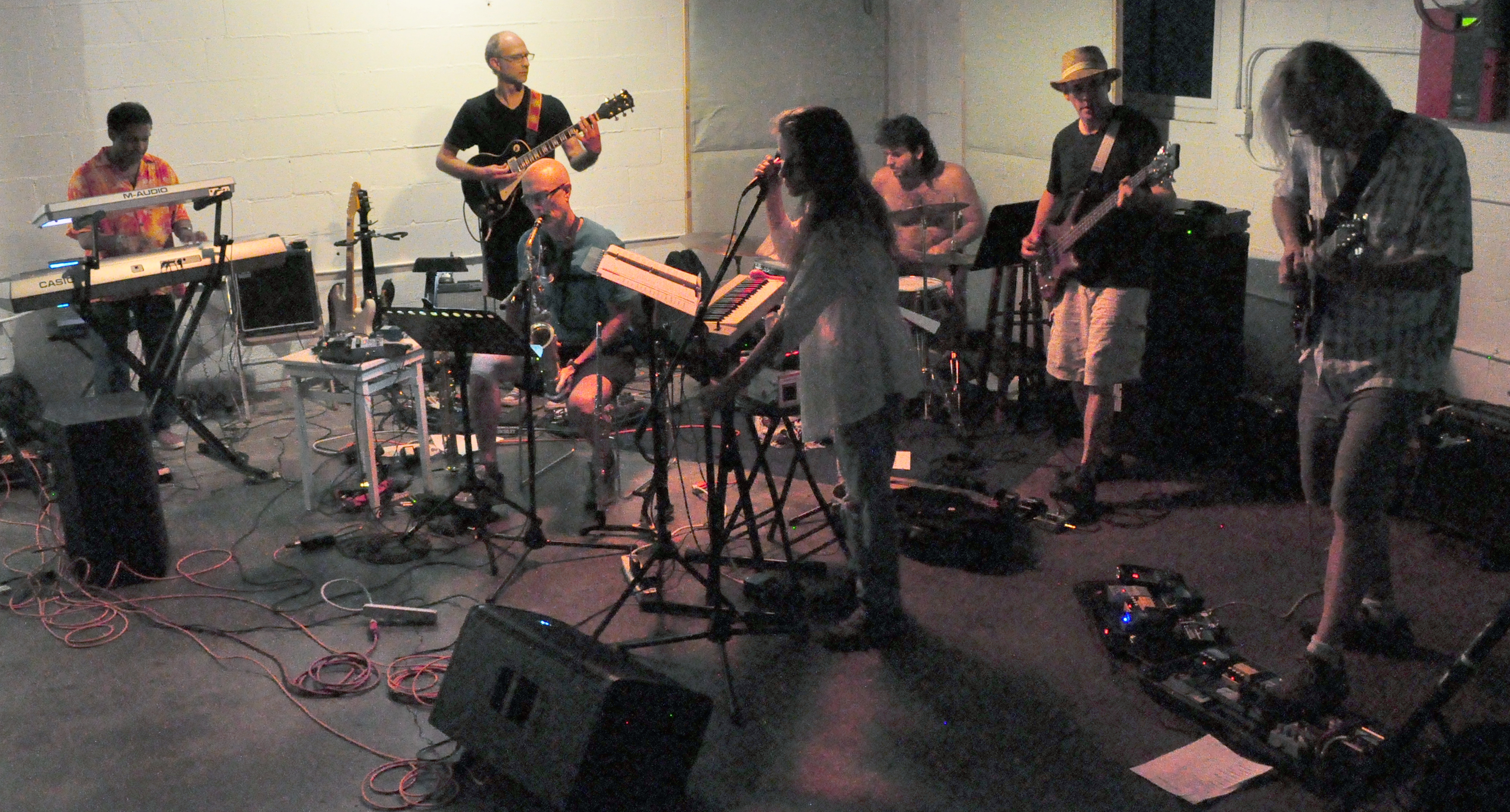
Thinking Plague playing at the 19th Olympia Experimental Music Festival, June 2013.

Johnson joined another local avant-rock band, Hamster Theatre in 1996, and suggested to its leader, accordionist and bassist Dave Willey that he join a new incarnation of Thinking Plague. Willey agreed and recommended Deborah Perry as a singer. At much the same time, Kerman moved to Denver and rejoined the band. With existing members Harris and Hotle the new Thinking Plague began recording new material that Johnson had written. In early 1998 the finished tracks were sent to Drake (now living in France) for mixing and production, and the result was Thinking Plague's fourth album, In Extremis, released in 1998 by Cuneiform Records.

In Extremis was rated the top album in 1998 by Gnosis, and its success resulted in new concert appearances for the band. A new member, Matt Mitchell on keyboards was recruited to replace Hotle who had left after the making of In Extremis, and Thinking Plague performed at the 1999 ProgDay Festival, followed by a tour of the eastern and mid-western United States. In June 2000 the band played at NEARfest, a recording of which was mixed three years later by Drake and released as Upon Both Your Houses in 2004 by NEARfest Records. In July 2000 the band toured France and Italy.

After the concerts in Europe, Kerman left the band and was replaced by ex-Sleepytime Gorilla Museum drummer David Shamrock. Work began on a new album, A History of Madness, which was released in September 2003 by Cuneiform Records. It was recorded over a period of two years, with half the band members flying into Denver from across the United States to add their contributions. A History of Madness was the first Thinking Plague album that Bob Drake did not produce; Johnson and Mark McCoin, of the Brave New Audio studio where the album was recorded, did all the mixing.

== Name ==
Thinking Plague's name was created by the band's founders, Mike Johnson and Bob Drake. According to Johnson, "The idea was to say something about that sort of existential condition of being unable to stop thinking, analyzing, or otherwise intellectualizing, which causes one to be separated from 'things in themselves', as it were."

== Members ==
A number of musicians have passed through Thinking Plague over the years, except for Mike Johnson who has remained with the group since its inception. The dates below indicate the years that they were active in the group.

- Mike Johnson (1982–present) – guitars, drums, percussion, vocals
- Bob Drake (1982–1994) – bass guitar, drums, percussion, vocals, guitar, bowed balalaika, synthesizer, piano, organ, noise, violin
- Sharon Bradford (1982–1984) – vocals, noise, casio mini-synth, drake noise box
- Harry Fleishman (1982–1984) – piano, organ, vocals
- Rick Arsenault (1982–1983) – drums
- Mark Fuller (1983–1988) – drums
- Susanne Lewis (1985–1990) – vocals
- Eric Moon also known as Eric Jacobson (1985–1988) – keyboards
- Lawrence Haugseth (1987–1988) – clarinet, synthesizer, vocals
- Mark Harris (1988–present) – baritone saxophone, clarinet, flute
- Shane Hotle (1988–1998) – piano, synthesizer, noise, organ, mellotron
- Maria Moran (1988–1989) – bass guitar, guitars
- Dave Kerman (1989–2000; 2007–2010) – drums, percussion
- Stevan Kovacs Tickmayer (2008) – keyboards, zither, processing, bass, voice
- Dave Willey (1996–present) – bass guitar, accordion
- Deborah Perry (1996–2008) – vocals
- Matt Mitchell (1999–2004) – keyboards
- David Shamrock (2001–2004) – drums, percussion
- Elaine Difalco (2008–present) – vocals
- Kimara Sajn (2009–2014) – drums, percussion, keyboards, vocals
- Robin Chestnut (2011–present) – drums, percussion
- Bill Pohl (2013–present) – guitars

== Discography ==
=== Studio albums ===
- ...A Thinking Plague (1984, LP, Endemic Music, US)
- Moonsongs (1986, LP, Dead Man's Curve Records, UK)
- In This Life (1989, CD, Recommended Records, UK)
- In Extremis (1998, CD, Cuneiform Records, US)
- A History of Madness (2003, CD, Cuneiform Records, US)
- Decline and Fall (2012, CD, Cuneiform Records, US)
- Hoping Against Hope (2017, CD, Cuneiform Records, US)

=== Live album ===
- Upon Both Your Houses (live at NEARfest 2000) (2004, CD, NEARfest Records, US; Reissue: 2020, digital, Cuneiform Records, US)

=== Compilations ===
- Driving Me Backwards (1987, LP, Dead Man's Curve Records, UK)
- RēR Records Quarterly Vol.2 No.4 (1989, LP, Recommended Records, UK)
- RēR Quarterly Vol.4 No.1 (1994, CD, Recommended Records, UK)
- Early Plague Years (2000, CD, Cuneiform Records, US) – remastered releases by Bob Drake of the LPs ...A Thinking Plague and Moonsongs on one CD

== See also ==
- Romantic Warriors II: A Progressive Music Saga About Rock in Opposition – 2012 documentary film
- Romantic Warriors II: Special Features DVD – 2013 documentary film
