= Editta Braun =

Austrian choreographer (born 1958)

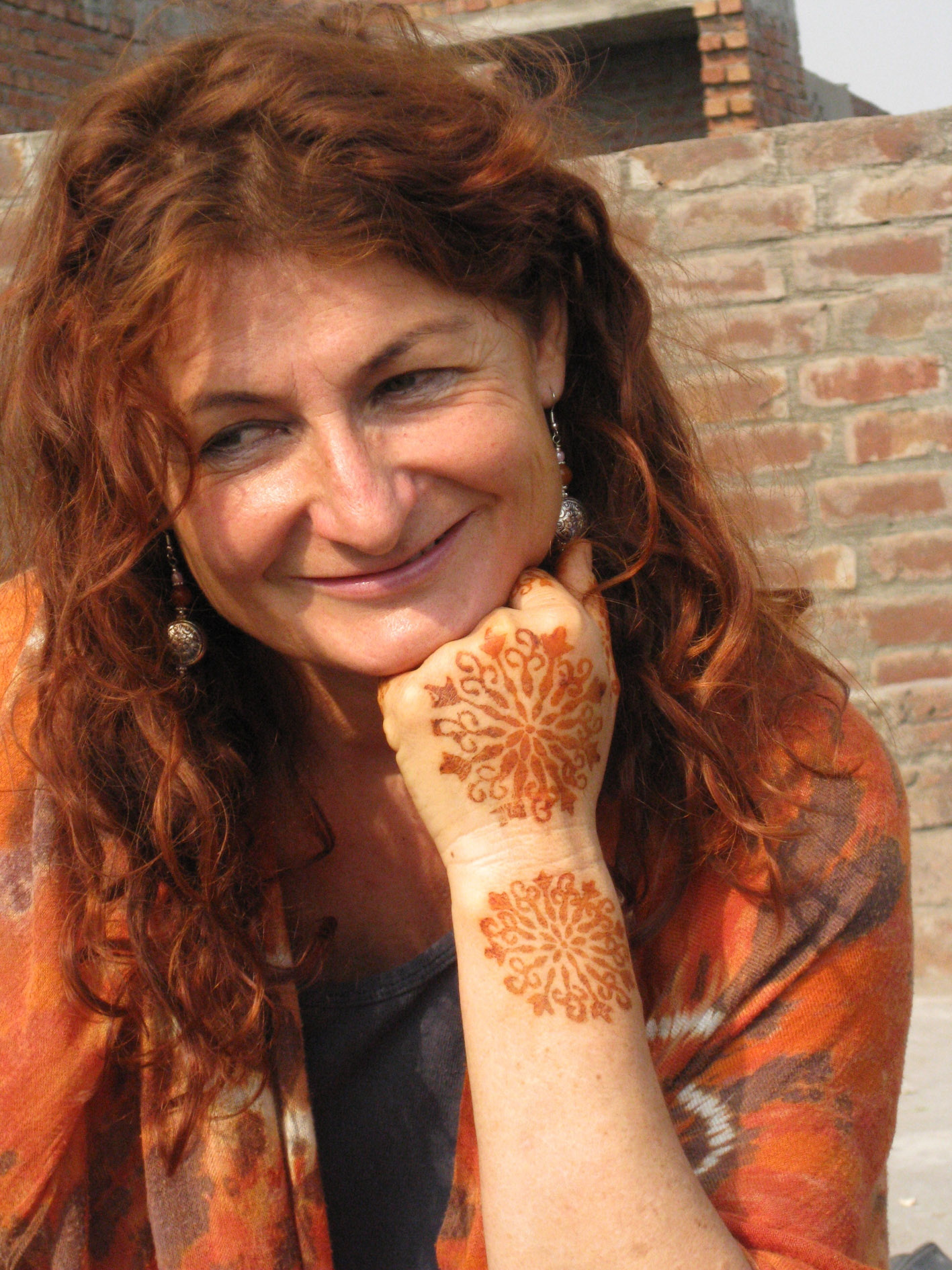
Editta Braun (2008)

Editta Braun (born 25 May 1958) is an Austrian choreographer, stage dancer, dance pedagogue as well as founder and director of the Salzburg dance company Editta Braun Company. She is known as a pioneer of contemporary dance in Austria and chairwoman of tanz_house, the association of freelance choreographers based in Salzburg.

== Early life ==
Braun was born in Vöcklabruck in the Upper Austrian Salzkammergut. As a child, she learned classical ballet and piano and trained intensively in gymnastics; she was Upper Austrian state champion in 1974.

From 1976 to 1982, she studied sports science and German language and literature at the University of Salzburg. When she encountered the work 1980 of Pina Bausch at a performance in Vienna in 1982 she became interested in contemporary dance.

In 1983, she began her dance training in Paris and New York. She was also influenced by acting lessons in method acting with Walter Lott and by a dance project with Wim Vandekeybus initiated by SZENE Salzburg, where she learned to combine her artistic gymnastics technique with contemporary, sporty dance.

== Artistic career ==
In 1982, Braun founded the "Kollektiv Vorgänge" together with Beda Percht, which won the Bagnolet Choreography Prize (ex equo with Saburo Teshigawara) with Lufus in 1986.

In 1989, she founded the Editta Braun Company in Salzburg, with which she has since produced and internationally toured at least one full-length dance piece every year. Her dance pieces have won numerous awards.

In the field of dance filming, Braun worked with Othmar Schmiderer, Wolfram Paulus and Hannes Klein, among others, from an early age. Her short film "Collision", directed in 1993 by Othmar Schmiderer, was awarded the bronze medal at the New York Film Festival in 1995. In 2022, together with photographer and commercial filmmaker Menie Weissbacher, she brought the alienating Luvos beings from their body illusion theatre to the screen in the short film LUVOS migrations.

Braun collaborates with composers, live musicians and artists from outside Austria such as Jean-Yves Ginoux and the Egyptian director Mahmoud Aboudoma. With Jean Babilée she created the dance theatre piece "La vie, c'est contagieux" in 1993/94 in Paris and Salzburg. Since 1996, she has worked with Thierry Zaboitzeff, who is her partner.

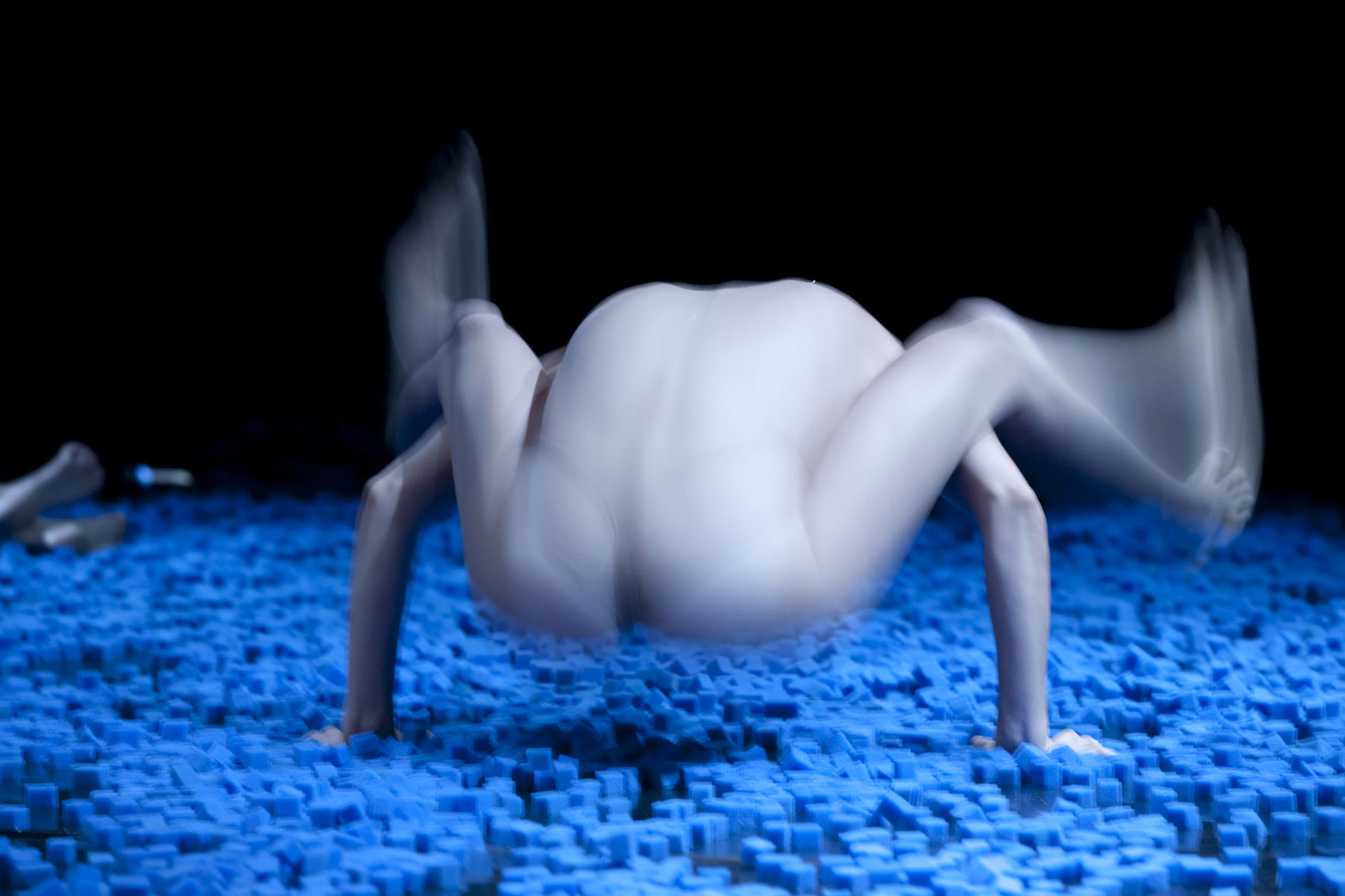
planet LUVOS, 2012

Braun's most internationally successful production is Luvos, vol.2., developed from the piece Lufus in Salzburg in 2001, that establishes a series of innovative, purely female body illusion theatres, including planet LUVOS (2012), Close Up (2015), Close Up 2.0 (2017), Fanghoumé (2019) and Hydráos (2020) and the short movie LUVOS migrations (2022/23). In these series, Braun and her company conduct continuous research into the visual overcoming of bodily boundaries over more than two decades. LUVOSmove® is the trademarked name for this very special, purely female body language which has also been the subject of scientific research since a colloquium in 2021 at the Anton Bruckner University Linz.

Since the 1980s, the decidedly political impulse in her works has got stronger. It can be seen already in the choice of themes for plays such as Voyage à Napoli, Luvos, vol. 2, King Arthur. In 2011, schluss mit kunst with text contributions by Kurt Palm and Christian Felber, among others, questioned the meaning of artistic creation in the face of hunger, war, environmental destruction, extinction of species and growing inequality.

Braun is known for applying an intercultural mode of production: she frequently develops socially committed projects with local artists, especially in Asia and Africa, and contrasts their cultural, historical, and social identities with Central European traditions. The resulting pieces include India (1998 in Bangalore and Salzburg), manifest (2002 in Senegal and Salzburg) and Coppercity 1001 (2007/08 in Alexandria/Egypt and Salzburg).

Also important in her work is the feminist impulse, which brings women's fates into focus and, in recent times, often leads to exclusively female casts.

=== Teaching ===
From 1987 to 2021, Editta Braun has taught acrobatic gymnastics and gymnastic dance forms as well as African dance and Modern Dance at the Interdepartmental Faculty of Sports and Movement Sciences of the Paris Lodron University Salzburg. Since 1997 she is teaching contemporary dance, physical theatre, choreography, improvisation and professional strategies at the Institute for Dance Arts of the Anton Bruckner Private University in Linz (Austria).

From 1992 to 1998, she worked as a lecturer at ImPulsTanz Wien (formerly Internationale Tanzwochen Wien) and from 1994 to 1997 as a commissioned choreographer for the Vienna State Opera Ballet School. In 2006, she supervised the youth project "wintertime" at the Festspielhaus St. Pölten.

As part of her teaching activities, Braun developed a specific improvisation technique that combines acting and contemporary dance to create "Physical Theater".

=== Recognition ===
- 1986: Second Prize and Award for Most Innovative Choreography at the Concours Chorégraphique International de Bagnolet in Paris for Lufus for the Kollektiv Vorgänge
- 1995: bronze medal at the New York Film Festival for Collision, director Othmar Schmiderer
- 2001: Award for Best Direction at the Cairo International Festival for Experimental Theatre for Nebensonnen
- 2014: Internationaler Preis für Kunst und Kultur der Stadt Salzburg
- 2017: Großer Kunstpreis des Landes Salzburg
- 2022: Prize for Best Ensemble Performance at the Cairo International Festival for Experimental Theater
