= Editta Braun Company =

Austrian dance company

The Editta Braun Company is a dance company founded in Salzburg, Austria in 1989 by the Austrian choreographer, dancer and dance instructor Editta Braun. Members of the multi-national team include dancers, composers, dramatic advisors and light designers. The Editta Braun Company’s work pursues political themes, including intercultural communication and feminist questions. The company is particularly known for the body theatre performance pieces Lufus, Luvos, vol. 2, planet LUVOS, Close Up, Close Up 2.0 and Fanghoumé. The Editta Braun Company has toured in Europe, Asia, Africa and performs at both large and specialty festivals.

== History ==
Editta Braun was one of a group of students who formed the dance collective Vorgänge in 1982. She founded her own company shortly before the group broke up in 1989. In 1997, French composer and musician Thierry Zaboitzeff began creating sound tracks to accompany the group's productions; most have been released as albums. Thomas Hinterberger and Peter Thalhamer have designed the lighting for many pieces.

The company collaborated with Egyptian director Mahmoud Aboudoma and his drama ensemble to create Coppercity 2001, based on one of the tales from 1001 Nights.

In 2002, the company began to incorporate texts into their productions, for example, Manfred Wöhlcke’s sociological essay Soziale Entropie and literary variations of the Arthur myth. In 2004, Austrian author Barbara Neuwirth wrote the text for Eurydike, a piece which was commissioned for the Brucknerfest in Linz, and included a chamber orchestra, drama and dance ensemble.

In 2004, the company increased its staff of artistic directors and choreographers to include Arturas Valudskis, Rebecca Murgi, Shlomo Bitton, Teresa Ranieri, Mahmoud Aboudoma, Robert Pienz and Iris Heitzinger.

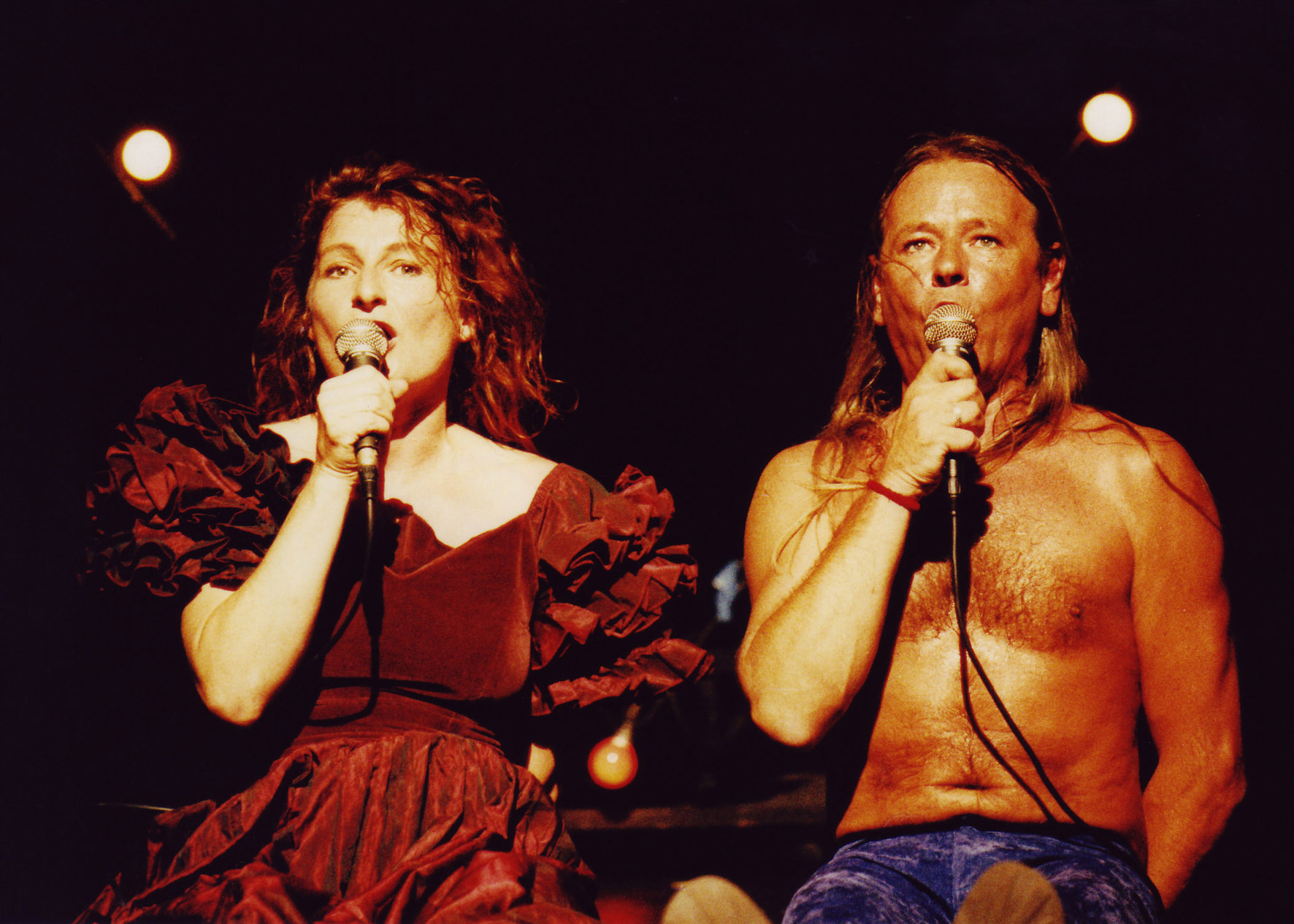
1997, Heartbeat, Editta Braun Company

Over the years, outstanding artists from various disciplines (besides dance: drama, composition, direction, writing, dramaturgy, video, light design) have contributed their creative potential to the company. In the beginning, the company’s dance style was especially influenced by Céline Guillaume and Georg Blaschke, the work together with dance legend Jean Babilée, for whom Jean Cocteau and Roland Petit created Le jeune homme et la mort, was particularly sensational, immensely furthering the company’s international acclaim. Composer Peter Valentin contributed his work during this time.

For ten years, dancer Barbara Motschiunik played a main role in each production; in 2006, Anna Maria Müller and Tomaz Simatovic joined the group, together with Juan Dante Murillo Bobadilla.

Since 2010, several younger performers have joined the company, including Iris Heitzinger, Martyna Lorenc, Jerca Roznik Novak and others. Many performances have been developed with dramatist Gerda Poschmann-Reichenau.

== The Luvos series ==
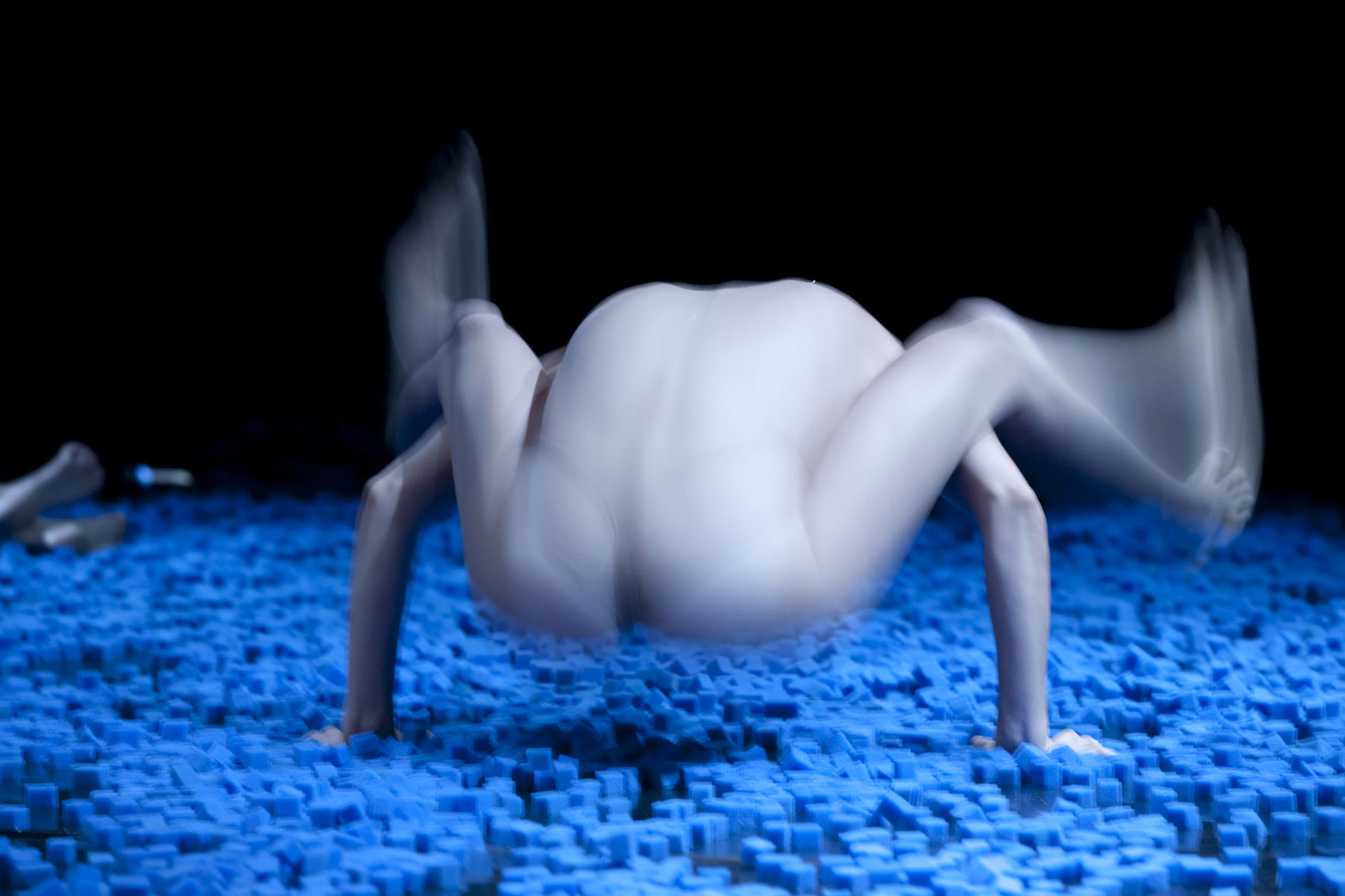
2012, Planet, Editta Braun Company

Luvos is a series of body theater performances. The series premiered in 1985 as Kollektiv Vorgänge’s Lufus.

Between 2001 and 2012, Luvos, vol.2 was performed worldwide before audiences totalling about 15,000 people, in Jerusalem and Tel Aviv, Thessaloniki, Novosibirsk and Moscow, Marseille, Limassol and Nicosia, Brussels, Tallinn, Kaunas, Riga, Vienna, Salzburg and Linz. In 2012, the piece was performed at the Manipulate Visual Theatre Festival in Edinburgh

planet LUVOS was performed in 2012 during the Brucknerfest in Linz and at Manipulate in 2014.

Close Up was performed at Manipulate in 2016.

The Editta Braun Company has mounted more than 100 performances of Luvos, and has been reviewed positively among others in Neue Westfälische, Neue Kronenzeitung, and TV Bomb

== Publication ==
In 2009, to commemorate the 20th anniversary of the founding of the Editta Braun Company, the volume Tanz Kunst Leben. 20 Jahre Editta Braun Company, edited by Gerda Poschmann-Reichenau and designed by Bettina Frenzel, was published. It contains reminiscences from people who have accompanied the company on its journey, descriptions and pictures from the dance-theater productions presented in the past 20 years in chronological order, as well as interviews with founder Editta Braun and participating artists.

== Selected full-length dance pieces and dance films ==
- 1989: Die Jagd – dance quintet
- 1990: Materialien für Tanz & Musik - dance and live music
- 1991: Collision - duet
- 1992: but kind old sun will know ... – dance theater
- 1993: La Vie, c’est contagieux - dance theater
- Collision – dance short film
- 1994: Voyage à Napoli - dance & rock’n roll live
- La Vie, c’est contagieux – video documentation about the creative process involved in making the stage piece
- 1995: Titania – search image in movement about Sisi, Empress of Austria, Queen of Hungary
- 1996: Im Dschungel des Pianisten – dance fable for young souls
- 1997: Heartbeat – concerto for dance & music, op. 1 - duo music and dance
- 1998: India – dance, quintet
- 1999: Miniaturen - dance and live music
- 2000: Nebensonnen - quartet
- 2001: Luvos, vol. 2 – body illusion theater
- 2002: manifest - drama, martial arts, dance
- Editta Braun Company in Dakar – video documentation about the creative process involved in making the stage piece manifest
- 2003: Tajine – improvisational project with dance, drama, live music
- 2004: Eurydike - symbiosis of three genres of the play ‚Eurydike’ from Barbara Neuwirth
- 2005: oXalis
- 2006: Matches of Time – dance theater
- 2007: Coppercity 1001 - dance and drama
- e.poration – short film
- 2008: Wenn ich einmal tot bin, komme ich ins Paradies - dance and song.
- 2009: Abseits – dance and drama
- 2010: König Artus – dance and drama
- 2011: schluss mit kunst – solo about migration
- 2012: planet LUVOS – a LUVOSmove® piece
- 2013: currently resident in
- 2014: Paula – dance solo
- 2015: Close Up – a LUVOSmove® piece
- 2016: LoSt – duo dance and drama
- 2017: Close Up 2.0 – a LUVOSmove® piece
- 2018: trails – dance quartet
- 2019: Fanghoumé – a LUVOSmove® piece, created for Senegal
- 2019: Layaz – duo
- 2020: Hydráos – a LUVOSmove® piece, trio
- 2021: long life – dance and drama, duo
- 2022: NaYma – dance and drama, solo
- 2022: LUVOS migrations - film by Editta Braun & Menie Weissbacher, AT 2022, 19 min.
- 2023: ALLES ANDERS – dance and drama, sextet
- 2024: Proximity – dance, trio
- 2025: UNDERDOGS – dancE, drama and acrobatics, sextet
- 2025: Women of Water, dance film, 9:30 min., AT 2025
- 2025: Woman of Air, dance film documentary,11:40 min., AT 2025
- 2025: WOMEN, dance film, 18 min., AT 2025

== Awards ==
- 1986: Second Prize and Award for Most Innovative Choreography at the Concours Chorégraphique International de Bagnolet in Paris for Lufus for the Kollektiv Vorgänge
- 1995: bronze medal at the New York Film Festival for Collision, director Othmar Schmiderer
- 2001: Award for Best Direction at the Cairo International Festival for Experimental Theatre for Nebensonnen
- 2014: Internationaler Preis für Kunst und Kultur der Stadt Salzburg
- 2017: Großer Kunstpreis des Landes Salzburg
- 2022: Best Ensemble Performance Prize and nominations for Best Director and Best Stage Design at the Cairo International Festival for Experimental Theatre / Egypt for the dance piece Hydráos
- 2023: Special Jury Music Award at the Breaking Walls Dance Films Festival Cairo/Egypt for the dance film LUVOS migrations
- 2023: 3rd place in the main category Best Overall Dance Film Winners at the FlorenceDanceOnScreen Festival/Italy for the dance film LUVOS migrations
- 2023: Best Visual Language Award at the Moving Body Festival in Varna/Bulgaria for the dance film LUVOS migrations
- 2024: Sittannnavasal International Film Festival / India, Best Experimental Short Film
- 2024: Austrian Film Festival Vienna, Best Experimental Film
- 2025: Best Women's Short Film beim Sittannnavasal International Film Festival / Indien
- 2025: Austrian Film Festival Vienna, Best Dance Film
- 2025: Premio Internazionale Public Jury Teresa Pomodora für dasT anzstück Hydráos in Milano, No'hma Teatro
