= Puppet Animation Scotland =

Puppet Animation Scotland, now known as Manipulate Arts, is a Scottish organisation that promotes and develops puppetry and animation as art forms. They hold an annual festival, the Manipulate Visual Theatre Festival (since 2008), and formerly held the Puppet Animation Festival (1984–2022). In November 2023 the organisation became known as Manipulate Arts. 2024 was the body's fortieth year. As of 2024, Puppet Animation Scotland/Manipulate Arts is supported by Creative Scotland with an annual grant of £180,000. It has three full-time employees; the artistic director is Dawn Taylor.

== Festivals ==
Puppet Animation Scotland/Manipulate Arts has organised two annual festivals. The first, established in 1984, was aimed at children; it was described in 2015 as the "largest performing arts event for children" in Britain; it ceased in 2022. The other, Manipulate, established in 2008 by Simon Hart, is an international festival of visual theatre and animation, aimed at adults, which focuses on puppetry but also shows other material. Then-artistic director Hart said in 2015 that his aim in founding Manipulate was not only to attract international acts to Scotland but also to "encourage Scottish artists to create work of a similar scale and ambition". He said he wanted to introduce viewers in Scotland to a continental Europe experimental theatre tradition of acts based on "images, objects and movement" rather than "text, character and plot-theatre", allowing for different audience interpretations.

The first Manipulate festival was in Dundee with four main acts, Light! by Compagnie Mossoux-Bonté (Belgium), Angel by Duda Paiva (the Netherlands), Appel d'Air by Vélo Théâtre (France) and The Seed Carriers by Stephen Mottram (England). Between 2009 and 2019 Manipulate festivals were held at Edinburgh's Traverse Theatre; in 2020 the festival moved to the Summerhall arts complex, also in Edinburgh.

The 2011 festival included The Animals And Children Took To The Streets by 1927, a glove-puppet act by Jerk and The Last Miner by Tortoise In A Nutshell, as well as animated films and masterclasses by Compagnie Philippe Genty. The 2013 festival hosted Physical Theatre Scotland and Vox Motus from Scotland, as well as Neville Tranter's Stuffed Puppet Theatre (the Netherlands), Nuku Theatre (Estonia), Cloud Eye Control (USA) and Yael Rasooly (Israel). Other acts in 2009–14 included the Editta Braun Company (Austria) and Figurentheater Tubingen (Germany).

Scott T. Cummings, reviewing the 2015 festival in American Theatre magazine, particularly praised And Then He Ate Me by Vélo Théâtre, a reworking of Little Red Riding Hood, as well as Mr. Carmen by Theatre AKHE (St Petersburg), which each melded "puppetry, material performance, toy theatre, shadow play, physical comedy" to give "highly theatrical" performances. The festival that year also had a puppetry act by Sandglass Theater (USA), as well as puppet animation short films; it showed dance works from Sandman (Belgium), Sabine Molenaar (Belgium), Andrea Miltnerová (Czech Republic), Paper Doll Militia (USA) and All or Nothing (Scotland) and also hosted workshops by Fabrizio Montecchi (Italy) on shadow theatre and by Polina Borisova (Russia) on object manipulation.

The 2020 Manipulate festival lasted nine days; it hosted a range of Scottish companies such as Swallow The Sea, as well as acts from the rest of the UK and from France, Russia, Slovakia, Slovenia and the USA. Festivals in 2021 and 2022 were curtailed by Covid; a full festival was scheduled in February 2023, directed by Dawn Taylor, with events planned at Summerhall, the Traverse Theatre, the Edinburgh Festival Theatre's Studio, the Fruitmarket Gallery, outdoors and online, featuring The Dab Hands by Fergus Dunnet and Ronan McMahon, Vanishing Point, Two Destination Language, Paper Doll Militia and Shotput. The 2024 festival was scheduled for 2–11 February at Summerhall, the Fruitmarket Gallery, the Traverse Theatre and The Studio, with twelve main acts from Scotland, England, Belgium, Denmark and France, including The House (Denmark), L'Amour Du Risque and Envahisseurs (Invaders) by Bakelite (France), Simple Machines by Ugo Dehaes (Belgium), La Conquete by Compagnie à, Plinth by Al Seed, Pickled Republic by Ruxy Cantir, Ragnarok by Tortoise In A Nutshell, Ruins by MHZ, Last Rites by Ramesh Meyyappan and Ad Infinitum, Tess by Ockham's Razor Theatre Company, and works by Surge organisation.
