= NaissanceE =

2014 video game

- Developer: Limasse Five
- Publisher: Limasse Five
- Director: Mavros Sedeño
- Composers: Pauline Oliveros; Thierry Zaboitzeff; Patricia Dallio
- Engine: Unreal Engine 3
- Platform: Microsoft Windows
- Release: 13 February 2014
- Genre: Adventure
- Mode: Single-player

NaissanceE is a first-person adventure game developed by French studio Limasse Five and released for Microsoft Windows in 13 February 2014. Players control Lucy, who navigates an expansive, abstract structure with shifting architecture and environmental challenges. The game incorporates light and shadow mechanics, platforming sequences, and exploration-based progression, with no direct storytelling or guidance.

The world of NaissanceE features large-scale geometric environments and dynamic spaces that emphasize solitude and discovery. Puzzles and traversal mechanics require players to adapt to the evolving terrain, solving spatial challenges and interacting with the environment to progress. The game draws inspiration from titles like Another World and Ico, encouraging interpretation through its minimalist design and atmospheric presentation.

== Gameplay ==
The gameplay in NaissanceE is presented in a first-person perspective, allowing the player to move around environments, sprint and jump over gaps and duck to crawl through short passages. Gameplay consists primarily of exploration, with occasional puzzles and platforming challenges. Unlike other games in the adventure and platformer genre, the player cannot interact with objects in the world except by moving into them. Puzzle mechanics include orbs of light which change position when bumped into, revealing new areas and covering other areas in shadow. When sprinting, a circle will flash in the center of the screen, prompting the player to pass a quick-time event in order to maintain their speed. Health depleted by falling will automatically replenish over time, while falling too great a distance will result in a game over. Certain hazards in the world will result in an instant game over as well.

== Plot ==
The player controls Lucy, a lone wanderer lost inside a massive, labyrinthine megastructure. The game begins with Lucy being chased before falling through a trapdoor. With no direction or explanation, she must navigate the shifting landscape, solving environmental puzzles and avoiding hidden dangers.

As Lucy ventures deeper, the structure around her constantly twists and reshapes itself. She descends an immense chasm, explores domicile structures, bridges, and bizarre, shadowy chambers, before eventually crossing upwards into a vast desert-like expanse. Ultimately, she encounters a hostile entity which pursues her along a dangerous, shifting gauntlet. She escapes into a bright expanse, and the game ends.

== Reception ==
The game generally received positive reviews, being praised mainly for its atmosphere, soundtrack, and graphics. The level of difficulty of some of the challenges has been criticised though, with several reviewers believing that those challenges are too difficult. It has also been said that, due to the open nature of the setting, it can be easy to get lost.

Chris Capel of GameWatcher complained that "NaissanceE could've been a neat game but Limasse Five should've just stuck with making a cool artistic world and left the actual gameplay at home."

Jonathan Fortin of Hooked Gamers commended the game for its artistic vision but complained that "the developers didn't fully commit to that vision" and said that it could have nearly been a masterpiece if "the entire game had focused on the puzzles that made its first few hours such a delight" but concluded that "the game still comes recommended...but only for non-epileptic players who have a high tolerance for frustration."

Jim Rossignol of Rock Paper Shotgun said that "the oozing (yet markedly unpretentious) atmosphere, the sense of mystery, and the occasionally exquisite vistas provide enough of a reward to make it worth seeing, even if you will squirm at bloodying your patience, and grinding it against brutal jumping puzzles."

Petra Schmitz of GameStar gave the game 65 out of 100 and found parts of the game annoying while being fascinated with the abstract landscapes.
