= Musique pour l'Odyssée =

Studio album by Art Zoyd
- Released: 1979
- Recorded: January 1979 at Overijse Studios, Belgium
- Genre: Rock in Opposition
- Length: 34:55
- Label: Atem
- Producer: Art Zoyd

Art Zoyd chronology
Symphonie pour le jour où brûleront les cités (1976)	Musique pour l'Odyssée (1979)	Génération sans futur (1980)

Professional ratings
Review scores
Source	Rating
Allmusic	3/5 stars

Musique pour l'Odyssée (French: Music for the Odyssey) is the second album by Art Zoyd, released in 1979 through Atem Records. In 1992, Musique pour l'Odyssée would be reissued as a double compact disc with Symphonie pour le jour où brûleront les cités, Génération sans futur and Archives 1.

== Track listing ==
Side one
No.	Title	Writer(s)	Length
1.	"Musique pour l'Odyssée" (Music for the Odyssey): "Odyssée" (Odyssey); "Falaise" (Cliff); "Combat" (Combat); "Etrave" (Bow); "Combat" (Combat); "Epave" (Wreckage); "Voile" (Sailing); "Odyssée (Odyssey)"	Gérard Hourbette	17:05

Side two
No.	Title	Writer(s)	Length
1.	"Bruit, Silence – Bruit, Repos" (Noise, Silence – Noise, Rest)	Thierry Zaboitzeff	10:44
2.	"Trio "Lettre D'Automne"" (Trio "Autumn Letter")	Hourbette	7:01

2008 bonus tracks
No.	Title	Writer(s)	Length
4.	"Ba Benzele"	Zaboitzeff	8:04

== Personnel ==
Art Zoyd

- Michel Berckmans – oboe, bassoon
- Franck Cardon – violin
- Daniel Denis – percussion
- Gérard Hourbette – viola
- Jean-Pierre Soarez – trumpet
- Michel Thomas – saxophone
- Thierry Zaboitzeff – cello, bass guitar, vocals

Production and additional personnel

- Art Zoyd – production, mixing
- Patrice Jean Baptiste – illustrations
- Pierre Desmedt – mixing, recording
- Eric Faes – recording
