= Vöcklabruck =

- Municipality
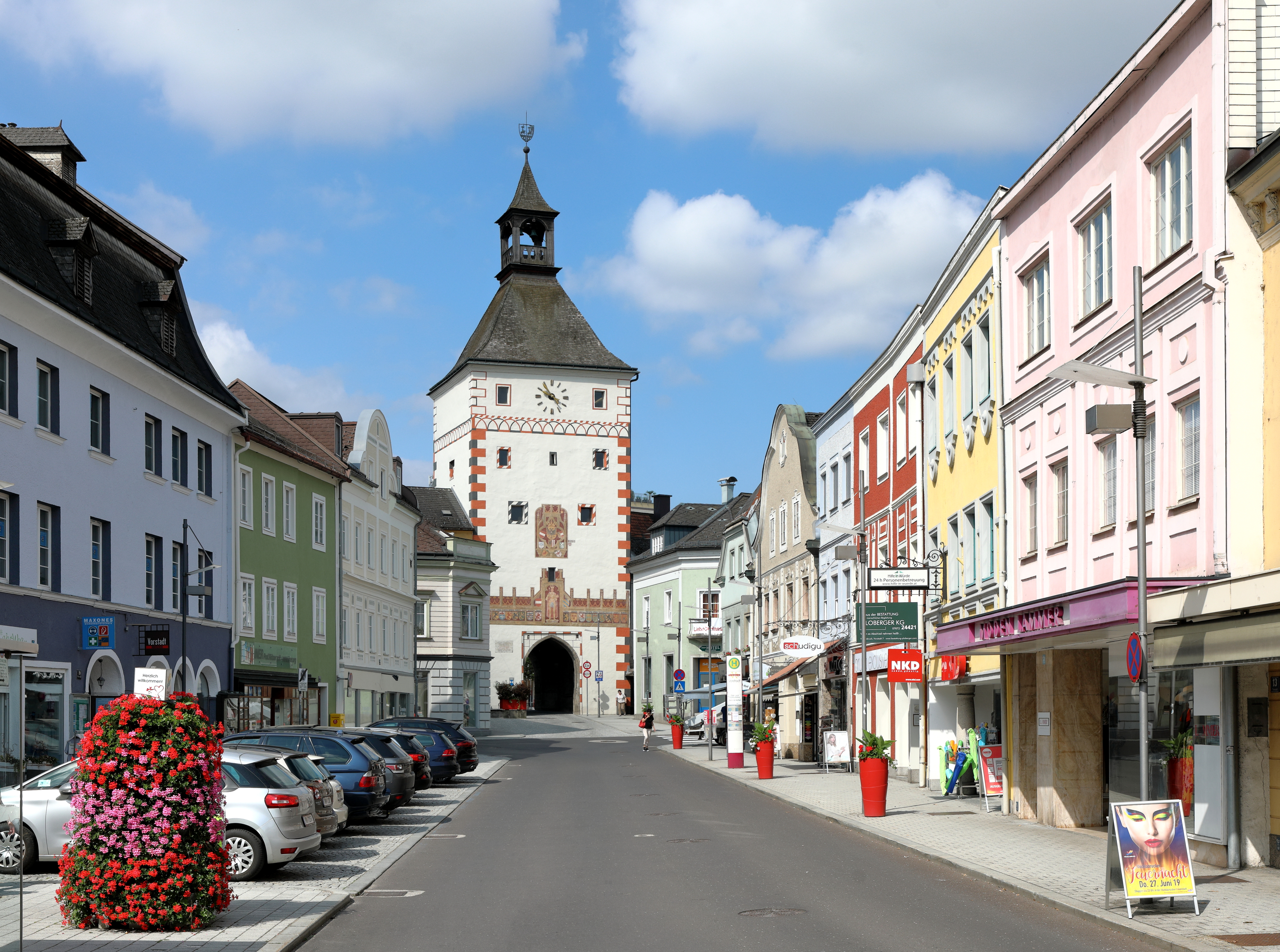

- Coat of arms

- Location within Austria
- Coordinates: 48°0′31″N 13°39′21″E
- Country: Austria
- State: Upper Austria
- District: Vöcklabruck

Government
  - Mayor: Peter Schobesberger (SPÖ)

Area
  - Total: 15.59 km^{2} (6.02 sq mi)
- Elevation: 433 m (1,421 ft)

Population (2018-01-01)
  - Total: 12,299
  - Density: 788.9/km^{2} (2,043/sq mi)
- Time zone: UTC+1 (CET)
  - Summer (DST): UTC+2 (CEST)
- Postal code: 4840
- Area code: 07672
- Vehicle registration: VB
- Website: www.voecklabruck.at

Vöcklabruck (Austrian German pronunciation: [fœklaˈbrʊk]) is the administrative center of the Vöcklabruck district, Austria. It is located in the western part of Upper Austria, close to the A1 Autobahn as well as the B1 highway.

Vöcklabruck's name derives from the River Vöckla which runs through the town, whose name in turn originates from a person's name ('Vechela') and 'Ache', meaning 'flowing water' or 'river'.

Vöcklabruck has many shops as well as services and schools. It was chosen for Europäisches Schützentreffen (the European Meeting of Marksmen) in 2003, and has and will play host to other events such as the Internationale Musiktage (International Music Gathering), Landesgartenschau (provincial garden show) 2007, and an Erdbeerfest (strawberry festival), among others.

== Population ==
Historical population
Year	Pop.	±%
1869	2,794	—
1880	3,076	+10.1%
1890	3,294	+7.1%
1900	3,562	+8.1%
1910	4,338	+21.8%
1923	4,520	+4.2%
1934	5,017	+11.0%
1939	5,546	+10.5%
1951	8,857	+59.7%
1961	9,353	+5.6%
1971	10,732	+14.7%
1981	11,019	+2.7%
1991	11,239	+2.0%
2001	11,697	+4.1%
2011	11,931	+2.0%

== Sights ==
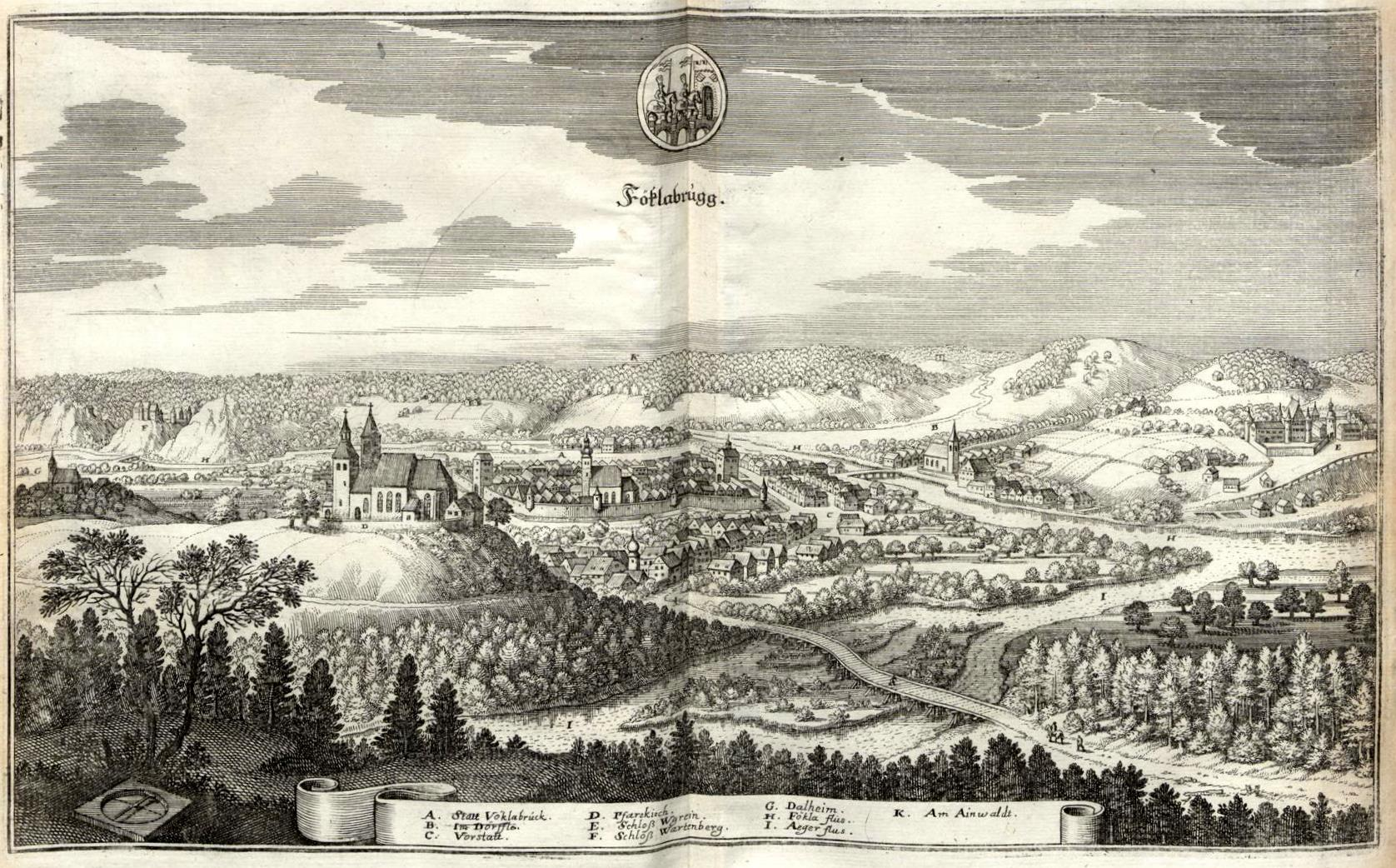
Vöcklabruck in 1679

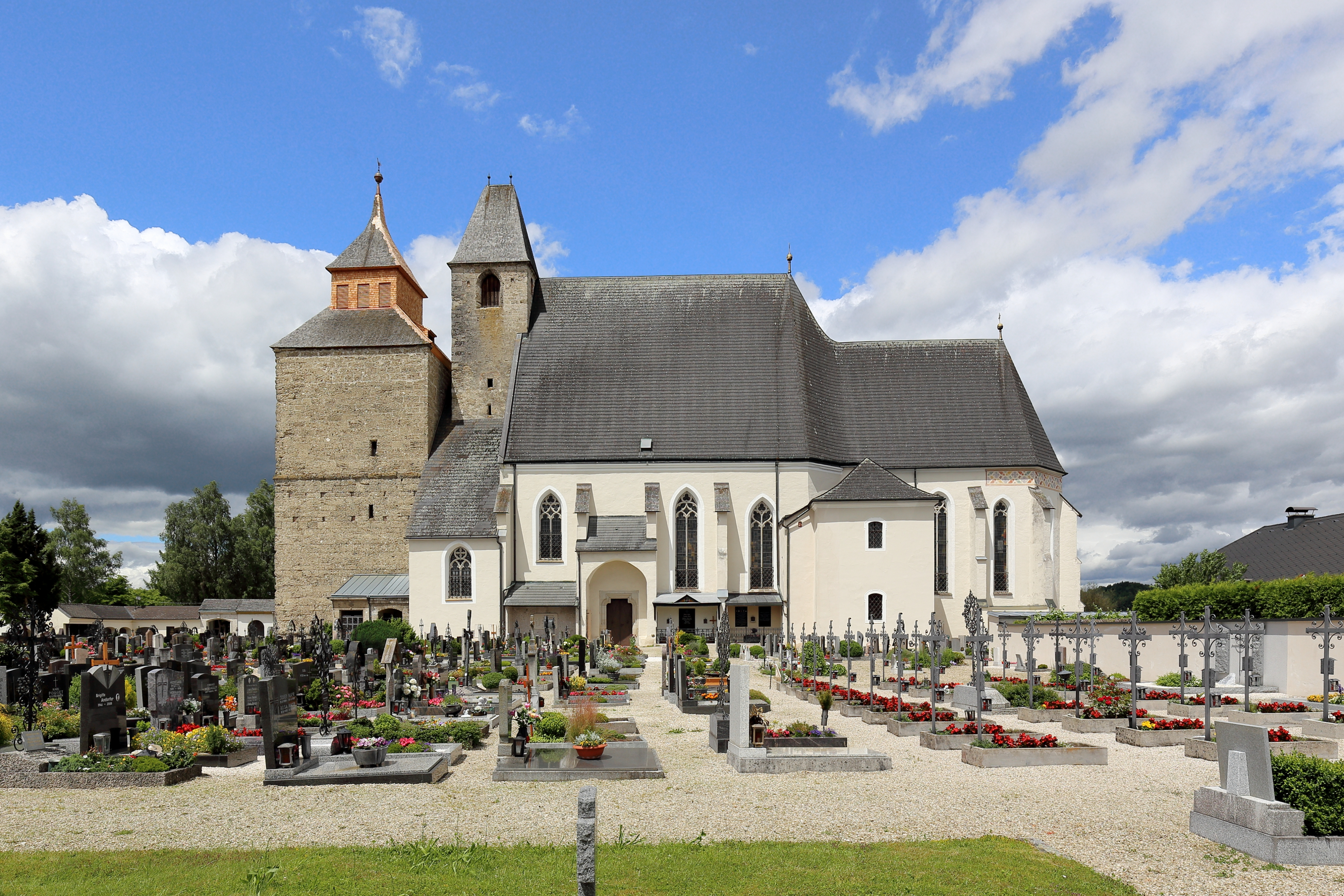
The church of Schöndorf, which is the oldest building of the city

The distance to Salzkammergut's lakes from Vöcklabruck (11 km (7 mi) to the Attersee, 16 km (10 mi) to the Traunsee, 40 km (25 mi) to the Mondsee, 68 km (42 mi) to the Hallstättersee and 72 km (45 mi) to the Wolfgangsee) has led to the town's description as "the gateway to the Salzkammergut". Near the town there are many recreational facilities where people can enjoy both indoor and outdoor activities. Alongside these, Vöcklabruck offers:

- In the town square's tower, frescos discovered in the 1960s. They date from 1502 and were painted by Tyrolean Jörg Kölderer.
- Dörflkirche/Ägidiuskirche' (St. Giles' Church), Baroque church constructed between 1688–1691.
- Schöndorfer Kirche, an early medieval fortified church, built before 824.
- Museum Heimathaus with Wolfsegg Iron

== Notable people ==
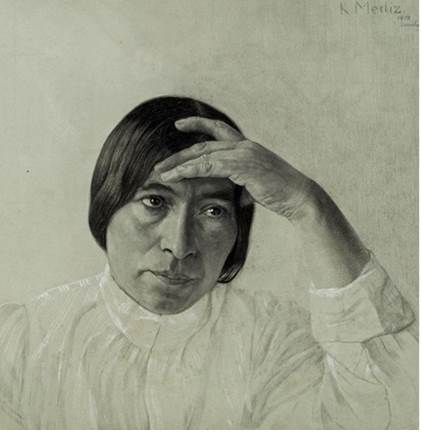
Emilie Mediz-Pelikan

- Leonhard Schiemer (ca 1500–1528), important figure in the Anabaptist movement
- Emilie Mediz-Pelikan (1861–1908), landscape painter, many works show Symbolist influence.
- Oskar Czerwenka (1924–2000), a bass whose residence was merged into a state music school named after him
- Sylvia Guirey (1931–1997), was an heiress, artist and art patron and former husband of Prince Azamat Kadir Sultan Guirey.
- Gerhard Narholz (born 1937), production music composer/conductor,
- Jim Silye (born 1946), Canadian politician, businessman and former footballer emigrated to Canada in 1951
- Wolfgang Holzmair (born 1952), renowned baritone recitalist and opera singer
- Editta Braun (born 1958), a choreographer, stage dancer and dance pedagogue
- Franzobel (born 1967), writer of books and plays, real name Franz Stefan Griebl.
- David Six (born 1985), musician, pianist, composer and multi-instrumentalist.
- Princess Alexandra of Hanover (born 1999), daughter of Ernst August, Prince of Hanover and Caroline, Princess of Hanover
- Andrea Eder-Gitschthaler (born 1961) politician, president of Austrian Federal Council

=== Sport ===
- Martin Konrad (born 1978), racing driver
- Peter Hackmair (born 1987), Austrian footballer, played 120 games
- Lukas Pöstlberger (born 1992), Austrian cyclist
- Laura Wienroither (born 1999), Austrian footballer for Manchester City and the Austria national team for whom she has played over 40 games

== International relations ==
=== Twin towns — Sister cities ===
Vöcklabruck is twinned with:

- Český Krumlov, Czech Republic
- Hauzenberg, Bavaria, Germany
- Slovenj Gradec, Slovenia
