= Peter Hackmair =

Austrian footballer

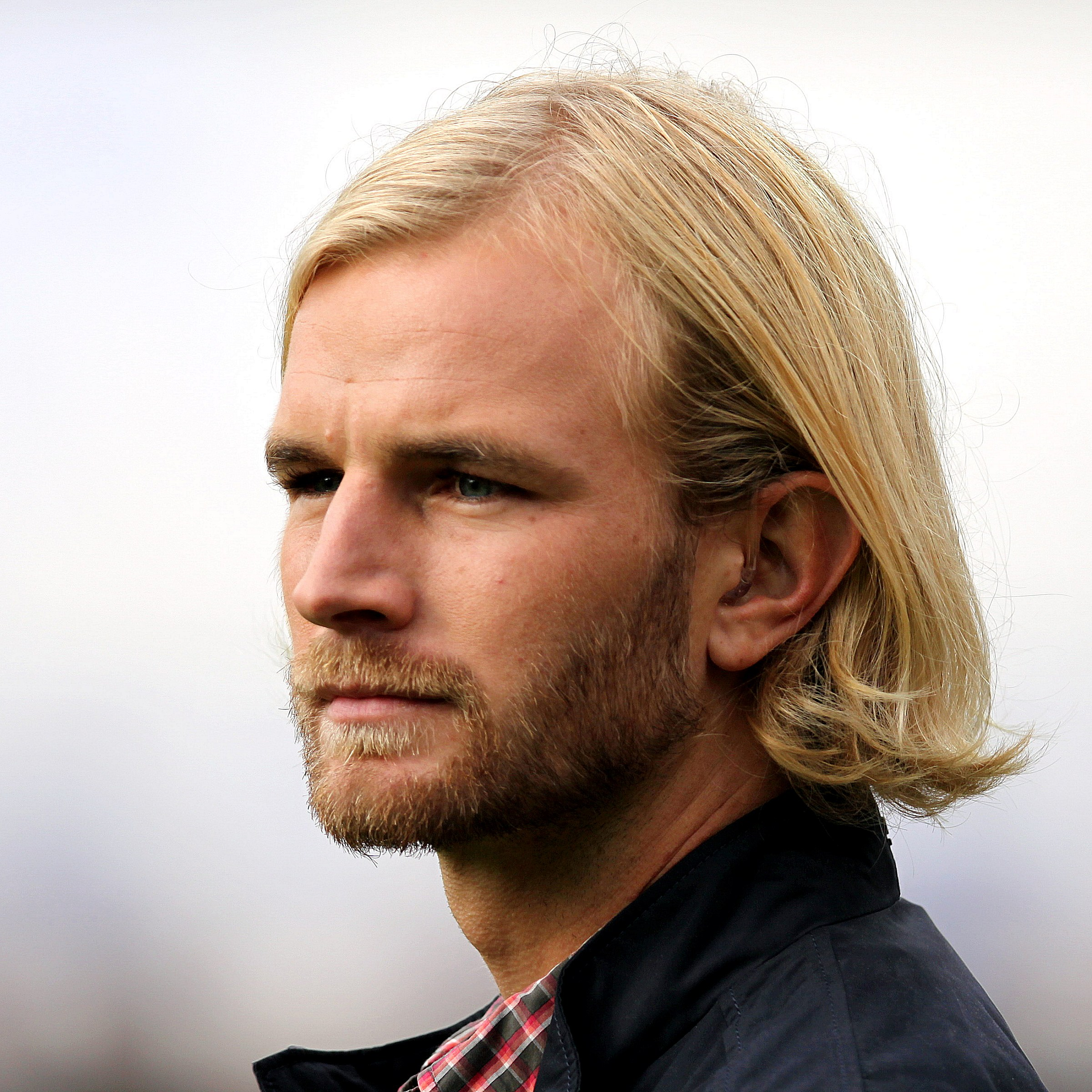

Personal information
- Full name: Peter Hackmair
- Date of birth: 26 June 1987 (age 39)
- Place of birth: Vöcklabruck, Austria
- Height: 1.77 m (5 ft 10 in)
- Position: Midfielder

Youth career
- SV Ried

Senior career*
| Years | Team | Apps | (Gls) |
| 2005–2011 | SV Ried | 102 | (3) |
| 2011–2012 | Wacker Innsbruck | 18 | (2) |

International career^{‡}
| 2007–2008 | Austria U21 | 8 | (0) |
- * Club domestic league appearances and goals as of 25 May 2011 ‡ National team caps and goals as of 9 January 2009

Peter Hackmair (born 26 June 1987) is a retired Austrian football midfielder. He played for FC Wacker in the Austrian Bundesliga among other teams. In August 2012, at his age 25, he ended his football career for his other passion, travelling.
