= Le mariage du ciel et de l'enfer =

Studio album by Art Zoyd
- Released: 1985
- Recorded: October 1984 at Sunrise Studios, Kirchberg, Switzerland
- Genre: Rock in Opposition
- Length: 47:30 (vinyl); 68:19 (CD)
- Label: Cryonic Inc.
- Producer: Art Zoyd

Art Zoyd chronology
Les espaces inquiets (1983)	Le mariage du ciel et de l'enfer (1985)	Berlin (1987)

Professional ratings
Review scores
Source	Rating
Allmusic	3/5 stars

Le mariage du ciel et de l'enfer (French: The marriage of heaven and hell) is the sixth album by Art Zoyd, released in 1985 through Cryonic Inc. The album is the first by Art Zoyd available in an expanded form on compact disc.

== Track listing ==
=== Vinyl pressing ===
Side one
No.	Title	Writer(s)	Length
1.	"Sortie 134 (part 1)" (Exit 134 (part 1))	Thierry Zaboitzeff	11:00
2.	"Cryogenèse: Rêve artificiel" (Cryogenesis: Artificial dream)	Gérard Hourbette	12:00

Side two
No.	Title	Writer(s)	Length
1.	"Cryogenèse: Rêve artificiel (suite)" (Cryogenesis: Artificial dream (continued))	Hourbette	6:12
2.	"Cryogenèse: Les portes du futur" (Cryogenesis: The doors of the future)	Hourbette	14:30
3.	"Sortie 134 (part 2)" (Exit 134 (part 2))	Zaboitzeff	3:48

=== CD pressing ===
No.	Title	Writer(s)	Length
1.	"Sortie 134 (part 1)" (Exit 134 (part 1))	Thierry Zaboitzeff	11:00
2.	"Cryogenèse: Rêve artificiel" (Cryogenesis: Artificial dream)	Gérard Hourbette	18:12
3.	"Io 1"	Zaboitzeff	3:51
4.	"Io 2"	Zaboitzeff	2:15
5.	"Io 3"	Zaboitzeff	5:15
6.	"Mouvance 2"	Hourbette	3:34
7.	"Mouvance 1"	Hourbette	5:54
8.	"Cryogenèse: Les portes du futur" (Cryogenesis: The doors of the future)	Hourbette	14:30
9.	"Sortie 134 (part 2)" (Exit 134 (part 2))	Zaboitzeff	3:48

== Personnel ==
Art Zoyd

- Patricia Dallio – electric piano, piano, keyboards
- Gérard Hourbette – viola, violin, keyboards, electric piano, piano, percussion
- Jean-Pierre Soarez – trumpet, percussion
- Thierry Zaboitzeff – bass guitar, cello, vocals, tape, keyboards, percussion

Production and additional personnel

- Art Zoyd – production, mixing
- Keith Haring – illustrations
- Gilles Martin – mixing
- Christian Petron – photography
- Unsafe Graphics – design
- Robert Vogel – recording
