= Génération sans futur =

Studio album by Art Zoyd
- Released: 1980
- Recorded: February 14 – February 21, 1980, Sunrise Studios, Kirchberg, Switzerland
- Genre: Rock in Opposition
- Length: 41:27
- Label: Atem
- Producer: Art Zoyd, Gérard Nguyen

Art Zoyd chronology
| Musique pour l'Odyssée (1979) | Génération sans futur (1980) | Phase IV (1982) |

Professional ratings
Review scores
| Source | Rating |
|---|---|
| Allmusic | 4/5 stars |

Génération sans futur (French: Generation without a future) is the third album by Art Zoyd, released in 1980 through Atem Records. In 1992, Génération sans futur would be reissued as a double compact disc with Symphonie pour le jour où brûleront les cités, Musique pour l'Odyssée and Archives 1.

== Track listing ==
Side one
| No. | Title | Writer(s) | Length |
|---|---|---|---|
| 1. | "La ville" (The city) | Gérard Hourbette | 16:50 |
| 2. | "Speedy Gonzales" | Gilles Renard | 2:55 |

Side two
| No. | Title | Writer(s) | Length |
|---|---|---|---|
| 1. | "Divertissement" (Entertainment) | Thierry Zaboitzeff | 6:45 |
| 2. | "Trois miniatures" (Three miniatures) | Alain Eckert | 5:15 |
| 3. | "Génération sans futur" (Generation without a future) | Thierry Zaboitzeff | 9:40 |

2008 bonus tracks – Archives 2
| No. | Title | Length |
|---|---|---|
| 6. | "Ex tractu do inocauit" | 2:56 |
| 7. | "Le combat des Dragons – 1" (Fight of the Dragons – 1) | 2:46 |
| 8. | "Le combat des Dragons – Final" (Fight of the Dragons – Final) | 1:52 |
| 9. | "Malbodium – Sommeil du Noble" (Sleep of the Noble) | 0:42 |
| 10. | "Malbodium – Entrée" (Entrance) | 1:33 |
| 11. | "Églises" (Churches) | 1:18 |

== Personnel ==
Art Zoyd

- Patricia Dallio – piano
- Alain Eckert – guitar
- Gérard Hourbette – violin, viola
- Gilles Renard – saxophone
- Jean-Pierre Soarez – trumpet
- Thierry Zaboitzeff – cello, bass guitar, vocals

Production and additional personnel

- Art Zoyd – production
- Patrice Jean Baptiste – illustrations
- Etienne Conod – mixing, recording
- Daniel Denis – percussion on "Génération sans futur"
- Carole Grave – photography
- Gérard Nguyen – production
