= Berlin (Art Zoyd album) =

Studio album by Art Zoyd
- Released: 1987
- Recorded: February–March 1987 at Unsafe Studios, France
- Genre: Rock in Opposition
- Length: 40:34 (vinyl); 59:14 (CD)
- Label: Cryonic Inc.
- Producer: Art Zoyd

Art Zoyd chronology
| Le mariage du ciel et de l'enfer (1985) | Berlin (1987) | Nosferatu (1989) |

Professional ratings
Review scores
| Source | Rating |
|---|---|
| Allmusic | 2.5/5 stars |

Berlin is the seventh album by Art Zoyd, released in 1987 through Cryonic Inc. Like Le mariage du ciel et de l'enfer before it, Berlin was made available in an expanded form on compact disc.

== Track listing ==
=== Vinyl pressing ===
Side one
| No. | Title | Writer(s) | Length |
|---|---|---|---|
| 1. | "Epithalame" (Wedding song) | Gérard Hourbette | 20:14 |

Side two
| No. | Title | Writer(s) | Length |
|---|---|---|---|
| 1. | "A Drum, a Drum" | Zaboitzeff | 20:20 |

=== CD pressing ===
| No. | Title | Writer(s) | Length |
|---|---|---|---|
| 1. | "Epithalame" (Wedding song) | Gérard Hourbette | 20:14 |
| 2. | "Baboon's Blood" | Thierry Zaboitzeff | 5:38 |
| 3. | "Petite messe à l'usage des pharmaciens: Offertoire" (Small mass for use by pharmacists: Offertory) | Hourbette | 3:13 |
| 4. | "Petite messe à l'usage des pharmaciens: Kyrie" | Hourbette | 3:36 |
| 5. | "A Drum, a Drum" | Zaboitzeff | 20:20 |
| 6. | "Petite messe à l'usage des pharmaciens: Introït" | Hourbette | 3:00 |
| 7. | "Unsex Me Here" | Zaboitzeff | 3:25 |

== Personnel ==
Art Zoyd

- Patricia Dallio – piano, electric piano, keyboards
- Gérard Hourbette – viola, violin, piano, electric piano, keyboards, percussion
- André Mergenthaler – cello, alto saxophone, vocals
- Thierry Zaboitzeff – cello, bass guitar, vocals, tape, keyboards, percussion

Production and additional personnel

- Art Zoyd – production
- Patrice Masson – photography
- Platel – illustrations
- Unsafe Graphics – design
