= Les espaces inquiets =

Studio album by Art Zoyd
- Released: 1983
- Recorded: August 1983, Sunrise Studios, Kirchberg, Switzerland
- Genre: Rock in Opposition
- Length: 44:29
- Label: Cryonic Inc.
- Producer: Art Zoyd

Art Zoyd chronology
Phase IV (1982)	Les espaces inquiets (1983)	Le mariage du ciel et de l'enfer (1985)

Les espaces inquiets (French: Worried spaces) is the fifth album by Art Zoyd, released in 1983 through Cryonic Inc. In 1989, Les espaces inquiets would be re-issued as a double compact disc with Phase IV and Archives 2.

== Track listing ==
Side one
No.	Title	Writer(s)	Length
1.	"La forêt qui avance" (The forest that advances)	Thierry Zaboitzeff	3:47
2.	"Cérémonie" (Ceremony)	Zaboitzeff	9:10
3.	"Images d'une ville-poussière: I. Errance" (Pictures of a dusty city: I. Wandering)	Gérard Hourbette	4:47
4.	"Images d'une ville-poussière: II. Cortège des officiel" (Pictures of a dusty city: II. Parade of the officials)	Hourbette	4:29

Side two
No.	Title	Writer(s)	Length
1.	"Images d'une ville-poussière: III. Au delà des vallées" (Pictures of a dusty city: III. Beyond the valleys)	Hourbette	4:05
2.	"Migrations"	Zaboitzeff	13:08
3.	"Le bruit du fer" (The sound of iron)	Zaboitzeff	3:03

== Personnel ==
Art Zoyd

- Patricia Dallio – electric piano, piano
- Gérard Hourbette – viola, violin, synthesizer, percussion
- Didier Pietton – alto saxophone, tenor saxophone, percussion
- Jean-Pierre Soarez – trumpet, flugelhorn, percussion
- Thierry Zaboitzeff – bass guitar, cello, guitar, vocals, tape, synthesizer

Production and additional personnel

- Art Zoyd – production, mixing, recording
- Unsafe Graphics – photography, design
- Robert Vogel – mixing, recording
