= Symphonie pour le jour où brûleront les cités =

Studio album by Art Zoyd
- Released: 1976
- Recorded: August 30 – September 9, 1976 at Toulouse Studio, Toulouse, France
- Genre: Progressive rock; contemporary classical
- Length: 44:00
- Label: AZ Production Michel Besset
- Producer: Michel Besset

Art Zoyd chronology
Symphonie pour le jour où brûleront les cités (1976)	Musique pour l'Odyssée (1979)

Professional ratings
Review scores
Source	Rating
Allmusic	4/5 stars

Symphonie pour le jour où brûleront les cités (French: Symphony for the day when the cities will burn; originally released as Art Zoyd 3) is the debut album of Art Zoyd, released in 1976 through AZ Production Michel Besset. In 1981, the entire album was re-recorded and released on Atem Records. Re-issues of both versions of the album in 2008 contain different bonus tracks.

In 1992, the 1981 re-recording would be reissued as a double compact disc with Musique pour l'Odyssée, Génération sans futur and Archives 1.

== Track listing ==
=== Original 1976 recording ===
Side one
No.	Title	Writer(s)	Length
1.	"Symphonie pour le jour où brûleront les cités: 1er Mouvement – Brigades spéciales" (Symphony for the day when the cities will burn: First Movement – Special brigades)	Gérard Hourbette	12:52
2.	"Symphonie pour le jour où brûleront les cités: 2ème Mouvement – Masques" (Symphony for the day when the cities will burn: Second Movement – Masks)	Hourbette	8:29

Side two
No.	Title	Writer(s)	Length
1.	"Symphonie pour le jour où brûleront les cités: 3ème Mouvement – Simulacres" (Symphony for the day when the cities will burn: Third Movement – Simulacra)	Hourbette	7:33
2.	"Deux images de la cité imbécile: Les fourmis" (Two images of the foolish city: The ants)	Rocco Fernandez	5:54
3.	"Deux images de la cité imbécile: Scènes de carnaval" (Two images of the foolish city: Scenes from the carnival)	Fernandez, Hourbette, Thierry Zaboitzeff	9:11

2008 bonus tracks: Archives I
No.	Title	Writer(s)	Length
6.	"Sangria"	Fernandez	2:32
7.	"Something in Love"	Jean-Paul Dulion, Fernandez	3:12
8.	"Live Golf Drouot Paris"	Fernandez	4:09

=== 1981 re-recording ===
Side one
No.	Title	Writer(s)	Length
1.	"Symphonie pour le jour où brûleront les cités: 1er Mouvement – Brigades spéciales" (Symphony for the day when the cities will burn: First Movement – Special brigades)	Gérard Hourbette	13:25
2.	"Symphonie pour le jour où brûleront les cités: 2ème Mouvement – Masques" (Symphony for the day when the cities will burn: Second Movement – Masks)	Hourbette	9:03

Side two
No.	Title	Writer(s)	Length
1.	"Symphonie pour le jour où brûleront les cités: 3ème Mouvement – Simulacres" (Symphony for the day when the cities will burn: Third Movement – Simulacra)	Hourbette	7:01
2.	"Deux images de la cité imbécile: Les fourmis" (Two images of the foolish city: The ants)	Rocco Fernandez	5:35
3.	"Deux images de la cité imbécile: Scènes de carnaval" (Two images of the foolish city: Scenes from the carnival)	Fernandez, Hourbette, Thierry Zaboitzeff	8:56

2008 bonus tracks: Archives 2
No.	Title	Length
6.	"Don Juan – Danse macabre"	1:23
7.	"Don Juan – Le bain" (The bath)	1:39
8.	"Don Juan – La sainte famille" (The holy family)	3:10
9.	"Un jour au château – Le parc" (One day in a castle – The park)	3:10
10.	"Un jour au château – Le satin" (One day in a castle – Satin)	3:10
11.	"Un jour au château – Le secret" (One day in a castle – The secret)	3:10
12.	"Don Juan – Le bain (final)" (The bath (final))	3:10

== Personnel ==
Art Zoyd

- Alain Eckert – guitar, percussion, vocals
- Gérard Hourbette – violin, viola, flute
- Jean-Pierre Soarez – trumpet, percussion
- Thierry Zaboitzeff – bass guitar, percussion, vocals

Production and additional personnel

- François Artige – engineering
- Michel Besset – production
- Jean-Pierre Grasset – engineering
- H2L Publicité Valenciennes – design
