= Art Zoyd =

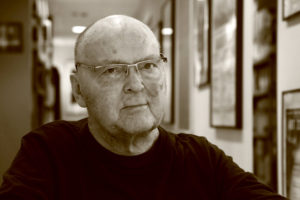
- Gérard Hourbette

Background information
- Also known as: Art Zoyd 3 Art Zöyd
- Origin: Valenciennes, France
- Genres: Rock in Opposition; film score
- Years active: 1969–present

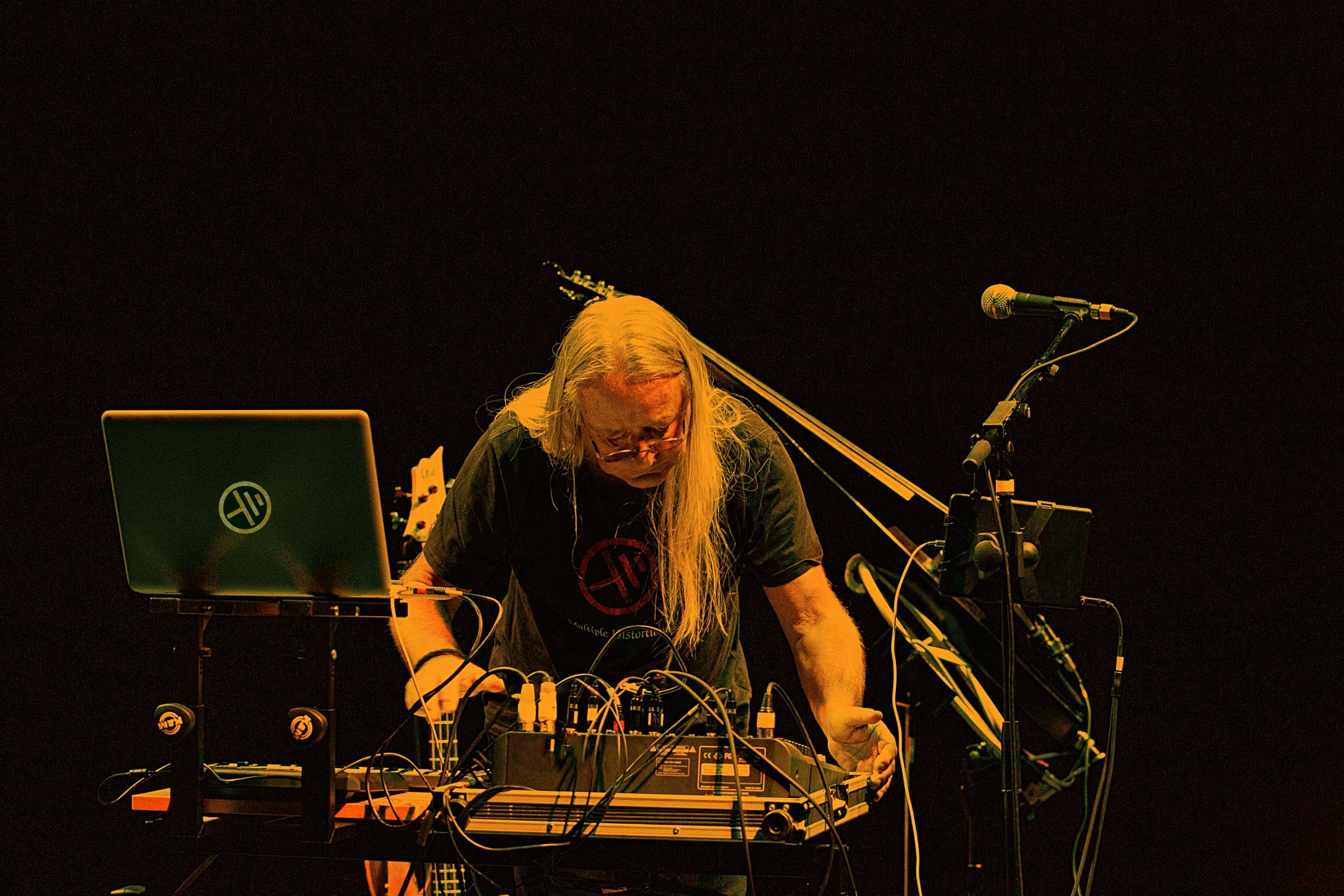
Thierry Zaboitzeff 2019

Art Zoyd is a French band formed in 1969, mixing free jazz, progressive rock and avant-garde electronica. Gérard Hourbette was the band's director and composer until his death in May 2018. Another key member of the band was Thierry Zaboitzeff, who left the band in 1997. They both joined the band in 1971 and reformed it completely in 1975.

== Complete Discography ==
- "Sangria", single (1971)
- Symphonie pour le jour où brûleront les cités (aka Art Zoyd 3) (1976)
- Musique pour l'Odyssée (1979)
- Génération sans futur (1980)
- Symphonie pour le jour où brûleront les cités (Re-Recording Of Symphonie pour le jour où brûleront les cités (aka Art Zoyd 3)) (1981)
- Phase IV (1982)
- Les espaces inquiets (1983)
- Le mariage du ciel et de l'enfer (1985) (for a ballet by Roland Petit)
- Berlin (1987)
- Nosferatu (1990) (for the film by F. W. Murnau and from the final ballet by Salzburg Vorgänge Bewegungstheater)
- Marathonnerre I (1992)
- Marathonnerre II (1992)
- Faust (1996) (for the film by F. W. Murnau)
- Häxan (1997) (for the film by Benjamin Christensen)
- u.B.I.Q.U.e. (2001) (based on the novel Ubik by Philip K. Dick)
- Metropolis (2002) (for the film by Fritz Lang)
- le champ des larmes (2006)
- La chute de la Maison usher (2008)
- Eyecatcher - Man With A Movie Camera (2011)
- Armageddon - Opérette Pour Robots (2012)
- 44½: Live and Unreleased Works (2017) – box set (12 CDs, 2 DVDs, 2 books, 2 posters)
- Phase V (2018) – box set (5 CDs)
- Art Zoyd Live - Et Avec Votre Esprit - La Forêt De Samplers (2021)

== See also ==
- Romantic Warriors II: A Progressive Music Saga About Rock in Opposition (2012)
