= Phase IV (album) =

Studio album by Art Zoyd
- Released: 1982
- Recorded: Sunrise Studios
- Genre: Rock in Opposition
- Length: 78:30
- Label: Recommended
- Producer: Art Zoyd

Art Zoyd chronology
Génération sans futur (1980)	Phase IV (1982)	Les espaces inquiets (1983)

Professional ratings
Review scores
Source	Rating
Allmusic	4.5/5 stars

Phase IV is the fourth album by Art Zoyd, released in 1982 through Recommended Records. In 1989, Phase IV would be reissued in a double compact disc with Les espaces inquiets and Archives 2.

== Track listing ==
Side one
No.	Title	Writer(s)	Length
1.	"Etat d'urgence" (State of emergency)	Thierry Zaboitzeff	14:38
2.	"Naufrage" (Shipwreck)	Gérard Hourbette	6:40

Side two
No.	Title	Writer(s)	Length
1.	"Dernière danse" (Last dance)	Zaboitzeff	4:31
2.	"Et avec votre esprit" (And with your mind)	Hourbette	5:14
3.	"Ballade" (Ballad)	Zaboitzeff	4:06
4.	"Deux préludes" (Two preludes)	Hourbette	2:04
5.	"La musique d'Erich Faes" (The music of Erich Faes)		0:11

Side three
No.	Title	Writer(s)	Length
1.	"Chemins de lumière" (Paths of light): "Chemins de l'éternel hiver" (Paths of eternal winter); "Comme de longs nuages paisibles" (Like long, peaceful clouds); "Empreintes" (Fingerprints); "Chemins de l'éternel été (Paths of eternal summer)"	Hourbette	15:10
2.	"Du sang sur la neige" (Blood on the snow)	Zaboitzeff	4:15

Side four
No.	Title	Writer(s)	Length
1.	"Vue d'un manège" (View of a carousel)	Hourbette	4:08
2.	"La nuit" (The night)	Hourbette	13:01
3.	"Les larmes de Christina" (Christina's tears)	Hourbette	3:34

2008 bonus tracks
No.	Title	Writer(s)	Length
1.	"Manège (live 1976)" (Carousel)	Zaboitzeff	12:38

== Personnel ==
Art Zoyd

- Gérard Hourbette – viola, violin, piano, synthesizer
- Didier Pietton – alto saxophone, tenor saxophone, percussion
- Jean-Pierre Soarez – trumpet, flugelhorn, percussion
- Thierry Willems – piano, keyboards
- Thierry Zaboitzeff – bass guitar, cello, acoustic guitar, vocals

Production and additional personnel

- Art Zoyd – production, mixing
- Etienne Conod – mixing, recording
- Thierry Legrand – photography, design
- Bubu Steiner – assistant recording
- Recommended Records London – production
