= Nosferatu (Art Zoyd album) =

Studio album by Art Zoyd
- Released: 1989
- Recorded: October 1988 – January 1989 at Unsafe Studios, France
- Genre: Rock in Opposition
- Length: 59:14
- Label: Mantra
- Producer: Art Zoyd

Art Zoyd chronology
Berlin (1987)	Nosferatu (1989)	Marathonnerre (1993)

Professional ratings
Review scores
Source	Rating
Allmusic	4/5 stars

Nosferatu is the eighth album by Art Zoyd, released in 1989 through Mantra Records. It is their first album to only be released on compact disc.

== Track listing ==
Nosferatu : music for the F. W. Murnau film (1921)
No.	Title	Writer(s)	Length
1.	"L'oeuf du serpent"	Gérard Hourbette	3:40
2.	"L'agent Renfield"	Thierry Zaboitzeff	3:17
3.	"Le voyage de Harker"	Hourbette	4:03
4.	"Le matin"	Hourbette	1:40
5.	"Le chateau"	Zaboitzeff	4:14
6.	"Nosferatu"	Zaboitzeff	2:42
7.	"L'oeuf du serpent II"	Hourbette	3:00
8.	"Rumeurs"	Zaboitzeff	2:35
9.	"Rumeurs II"	Zaboitzeff	2:56
10.	"Anaphase"	Hourbette	4:08
11.	"Le maitre arrive"	Hourbette	2:24
12.	"Rumeurs III"	Zaboitzeff	2:39
13.	"Les docteurs"	Zaboitzeff	2:28
14.	"La peste"	Hourbette	3:14
15.	"Livre des vampires"	Zaboitzeff	1:47
16.	"Anaphase II"	Hourbette	4:38
17.	"Le maitre est mort"	Zaboitzeff	3:31

Vorgänge : music from final ballet by the Salzburg Vorgänge Bewegungstheater, for the sixth centenary of the belfry at Béthune, France
No.	Title	Writer(s)	Length
18.	"Marees"	Hourbette	8:33
19.	"Beffroi"	Zaboitzeff	3:35
20.	"Sleep No More"	Zaboitzeff	5:30

== Personnel ==
Art Zoyd

- Patricia Dallio – piano, keyboards
- Gérard Hourbette – viola, violin, keyboards, percussion, tape, sampler
- André Mergenthaler – cello, alto saxophone
- Thierry Zaboitzeff – cello, bass guitar, vocals, keyboards, tape, sampler, percussion

Production and additional personnel

- Art Zoyd – production, mastering, mixing, recording
- Unsafe Graphics – design
- Emmanuel Valette – photography
- Fritz Arno Wagner – photography
