= Thierry Zaboitzeff =

French multi-instrumentalist and composer

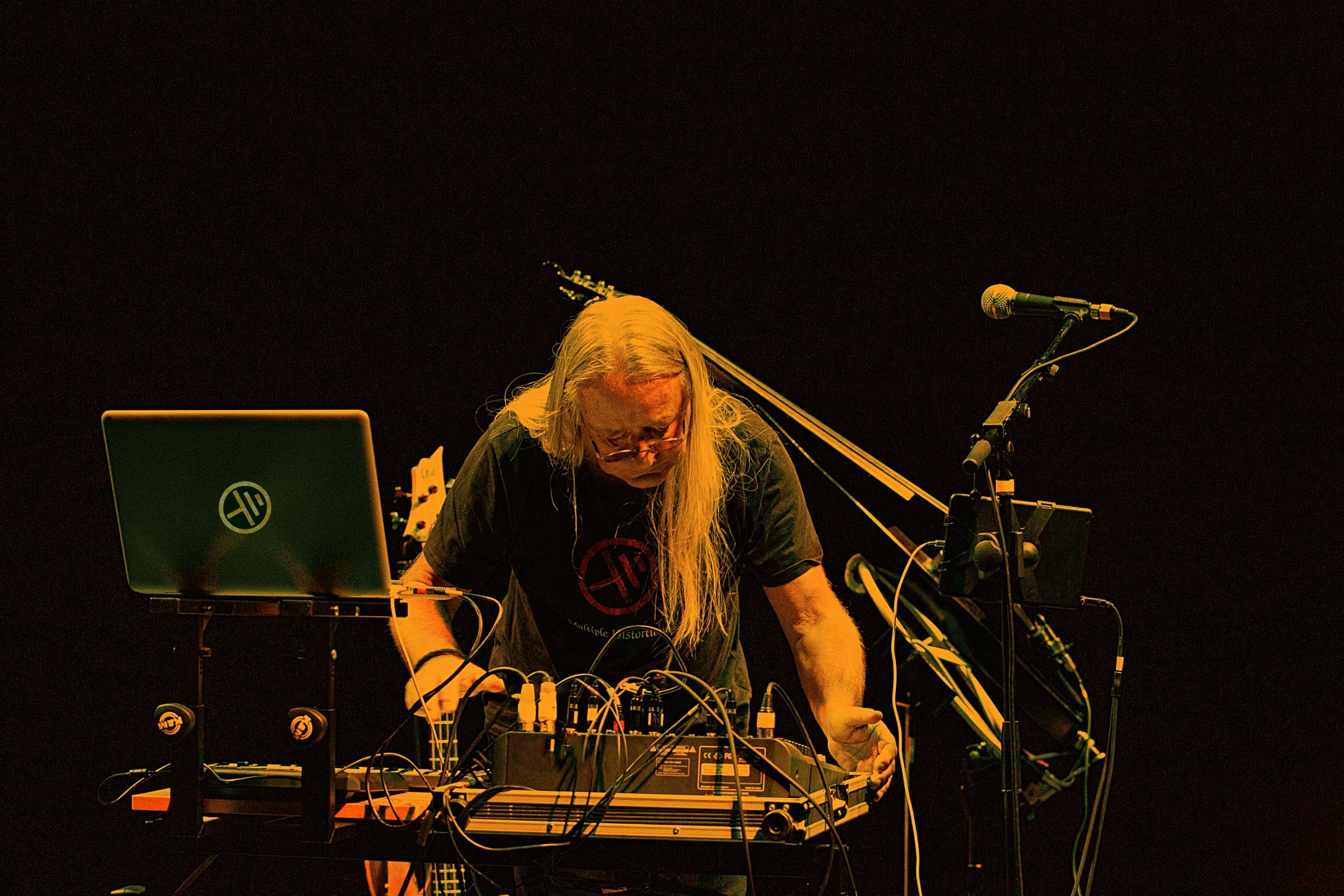
- Thierry Zaboitzeff in 2019 at ARGEkultur Salzburg.

Background information
- Born: July 27, 1953 (age 73); Maubeuge, France
- Genres: Experimental music Electroacoustic music
- Occupation: Musician
- Website: www.zaboitzeff.org

Thierry Zaboitzeff (born 1953, French pronunciation: [tjɛʁi zabwatsɛf]) is a French multi-instrumentalist and composer.

== Biography ==
Zaboitzeff was born near Maubeuge in 1953. His paternal grandfather was a White Russian émigré from Arkhangelsk.

He was co-artistic director with Gérard Hourbette of the band Art Zoyd from 1975 to 1997. In 1997, he left Art Zoyd in order to realize his own projects and began performing solo. In 1999, he established the band Zaboitzeff & Crew. After its breakup, he went on to lead the band Aria Primitva beginning in 2018.

Several of Zaboitzeff's compositions from 1984 were incorporated by Mavros Sedeño into the 2014 French art game NaissanceE.

== See also ==
- Gérard Hourbette
- Patricia Dallio
