= Jean Babilée =

Jean Gutmann (professional name Jean Babilée; 3 February 1923 – 30 January 2014) was a prominent French dancer and choreographer of the latter half of the 20th century. He is considered to have been one of modern ballet's greatest performers, and the first French dancer to gain international acclaim. Babilée has been called the "enfant terrible of dance."

== Biography ==
Born in Paris in 1923, the son of a doctor, Babilée studied at the Paris Opéra Ballet School from 1936 to 1940. His dance career was interrupted during World War II because he was Jewish on his father's side. He left Paris in 1940 when the Wehrmacht was approaching the city, but returned to dance with the Paris Opera Ballet in early 1942. He narrowly escaped being sent to Auschwitz during the Vel' d'Hiv Roundup in Paris on 16 July 1942. In early 1943 he left the city to avoid compulsory deportation to Germany as a forced laborer. He spent the rest of the war with the French Resistance, fighting with the Maquis in Touraine.

After the war, Babilée returned to dance, joining the Soirées de la Danse, which later became Les Ballet des Champs Elysées. His birth name was Jean Gutmann, but he adopted his mother's maiden name for professional use. Babilée enjoyed some of his greatest successes as a member of Les Ballets des Champs-Elysées and Les Ballets de Paris. From 1945 to 1950 he was principal dancer of the Ballets des Champs-Élysées, for which he created roles in ballets including Jeu de cartes, Jean Cocteau's Le Jeune Homme et la Mort, L'Amour et son amour, and Till Eulenspiegel. In several of these ballets he performed opposite his wife, featured ballerina Nathalie Philippart. In the 1940s Babilée quickly developed a reputation for his physical prowess. It was said that he could leap better than any dancer since Nijinsky, and in the 1946 premiere of Le Jeune Homme et la Mort he hung by his neck on a gallows for one minute, supported only by wrapping one arm around a pillar.

In the 1950s he danced as a guest of Le Ballet de l'Opéra de Paris and the American Ballet Theatre, before forming his own company, Les Ballets Jean Babilée. In 1972 and 1973 he served as director of the Ballet du Rhin in Strasbourg. In the early 1980s, Maurice Béjart created the solo Life for him. In 1984, at the age of 61, he performed Le Jeune Homme et la Mort with the Ballet de Marseille.

He also appeared as a stage actor and in several films.

The 2000 documentary film Le Mystère Babilée, directed by Patrick Bensard, reconstructs Babilée's career through interviews with the dancer, excerpts from his choreographic work, and recollections by observers and collaborators including Béjart, Christian Lacroix, Jean-Paul Goude and Yvette Chauviré.
